= 2024 Ýokary Liga =

Ýokary Liga
- Season: 2024
- Dates: 3 March – 27 December
- Champions: Arkadag (2nd title)
- AFC Champions League Two: Arkadag; Ahal
- AFC Challenge League: Altyn Asyr
- Matches: 128
- Goals: 429 (3.35 per match)
- Top goalscorer: Didar Durdyýew (31)
- Biggest home win: Arkadag 9–0 Merw (17 April 2024)
- Biggest away win: Köpetdag Aşgabat 0–8 Arkadag] (26 November 2024)
- Highest scoring: Aşgabat 1–8 Arkadag (2 April 2024); Arkadag 9–0 Merw (17 April 2024); Merw 1–8 Arkadag (24 September 2024)
- Longest winning run: Arkadag (30 matches)
- Longest unbeaten run: Arkadag (30 matches)
- All statistics correct as of 27 December 2024.

The 2024 Ýokary Liga was the 32nd edition of the top tier professional Yokary Liga football annual competition in Turkmenistan administered by the Football Federation of Turkmenistan.

== Season events ==
Prior to the start of the league season, it was announced that the same nine teams that participated in the previous season, would participate in the 2024 season, beginning on 3 March.

On 7 October, defending champions Arkadag successfully retained their title after a 5–1 victory over Nebitçi.

== Teams ==
Team	Location	Venue	Capacity
Arkadag	Arkadag	Nusaý Stadium; Arkadag Stadium	3,000; 10,000
Ahal	Anau (Ahal Region)	Ashgabat Stadium	20,000
Altyn Asyr	Ashgabat	Buzmeyin Sport Complex	10,000
Aşgabat	Ashgabat	Ashgabat Stadium	20,000
Nebitçi	Balkanabat	Balkanabat Sport Complex (Balkan Region)	10,000
Energetik	Saparmyrat Türkmenbaşy, Mary District (Mary Region)	Energetik Stadium (Mary)	1,000
Köpetdag Aşgabat	Ashgabat	Köpetdag Stadium	26,000
Merw	Mary (Mary Region)	Mary Sport Complex	10,000
Şagadam	Türkmenbaşy (Balkan Region)	Şagadam Stadium	5,000

== Personnel and sponsoring ==
Team	Manager/Head coach	Captain	Kit manufacturer	Sponsor
Arkadag	(Turkmenistan) Wladimir Baýramow	(Turkmenistan) Arslanmyrat Amanow	Jako	Arkadag City
Ahal	(Turkmenistan) Serdar Geldiýew	(Turkmenistan) Elman Tagaýew	Hummel	TNÖ / Dragon Oil
Altyn Asyr	(Turkmenistan) Ýazguly Hojageldiýew	(Turkmenistan) Ahmet Ataýew	Adidas	TM CELL
Aşgabat	(Turkmenistan) Tofik Shukurov		Jako	
Nebitçi	(Turkmenistan) Amanmyrat Meredow		Kelme	Mitro International Limited
Energetik	(Turkmenistan) Rahmanguly Baýlyýew		Kelme	
Köpetdag Aşgabat	(Turkmenistan) Tofik Şükürow		Kelme	
Merw	(Turkmenistan) Jemşit Orazmuhammedow		Jako	Türkmengaz
Şagadam	(Turkmenistan) Ali Gurbani		Kelme	Yug-Neftegaz Private Limited / Turkmenbashi Complex of Oil Refineries

== Coaching changes ==
Team	Outgoing coach	Manner of departure	Date of vacancy	Position in table	Incoming coach	Date of appointment
Merw	(Turkmenistan) Witaliý Alikperow		Preseason		(Turkmenistan) Dzhemshit Orazmukhamedov	
Şagadam	(Turkmenistan) Aleksandr Klimenko		Preseason		(Turkmenistan) Yevgeny Tkachenko	
Şagadam	(Turkmenistan) Yevgeny Tkachenko				(Turkmenistan) Ali Gurbani	26 July 2024
Aşgabat	(Turkmenistan) Said Seýidow				(Turkmenistan) Tofik Shukurov	August 2024
Ahal	(Turkmenistan) Serdar Geldiýew				(Turkmenistan) Döwletmyrat Annaýew	April 2024
Ahal	(Turkmenistan) Döwletmyrat Annaýew				(Turkmenistan) Welsähet Öwezow	June 2024
Köpetdag	(Turkmenistan) Tofik Shukurov				(Turkmenistan) Begenç Garaýew	August 2024

== Regular season ==
=== League table ===
Pos	Team	Pld	W	D	L	GF	GA	GD	Pts	Qualification or relegation
1	Arkadag	30	30	0	0	147	20	+127	90	Qualification for AFC Champions League Two Group Stage (Note: Arkadag qualified for the Champions League Two group stage by winning the 2024–25 AFC Challenge League)
2	Ahal	30	22	1	7	68	29	+39	67	Qualification for AFC Champions League Two Playoffs (Note: As Arkadag won the 2024–25 AFC Challenge League, 2024 Ýokary Liga, and 2024 Turkmenistan Cup, and since Turkmenistan has no ACL Two direct slot based on its regional ranking, one additional ACL Two direct slot was allocated to Turkmenistan for Arkadag and the spot reserved for Ýokary Liga champions was transferred to the runners-up, Ahal.)
3	Altyn Asyr	30	21	2	7	72	33	+39	65	Qualification for AFC Challenge League group stage
4	Şagadam	30	13	1	16	40	51	−11	40	
5	Merw	30	11	2	17	21	60	−39	35	
6	Aşgabat	30	8	4	18	27	58	−31	28	
7	Nebitçi	30	8	3	19	28	64	−36	27	
8	Köpetdag Aşgabat	30	4	5	21	18	69	−51	17	
9	Energetik	16	1	2	13	8	45	−37	5	Excluded or withdrew

Source: Soccerway, TFF
Rules for classification: 1) Points; 2) Head-to-head points; 3) Head-to-head goal difference; 4) Head-to-head goals scored; 5) Goal difference; 6) Goals scored.

=== Results ===
Home \ Away	AHA	ALT	ARK	ASG	ENE	KOP	MER	NEB	SAG
Ahal		0–2	0–4	4–0	5–0	4–0	5–1	4–0	1–0
Ahal		2–0	1–2	3–0		3–1	2–0	2–0	6–0
Altyn Asyr	2–2		2–4	2–0	4–2	1–0	5–2	2–1	1–2
Altyn Asyr	1–0		0–4	3–1		4–0	5–0	5–0	2–0
Arkadag	4–1	3–0		7–1	6–0	5–0	9–0	5–0	3–1
Arkadag	5–1	5–1		4–1		5–1	4–0	5–1	5–1
Aşgabat	1–2	1–4	1–8		2–1	0–0	1–0	1–2	1–0
Aşgabat	1–2	1–2	0–3			1–1	2–0	2–1	0–0
Energetik	0–1	0–6	0–7	0–3		0–0	0–1	2–3	1–3
Köpetdag Aşgabat	3–2	0–3	1–5	0–2	1–1		2–0	1–0	1–4
Köpetdag Aşgabat	1–4	0–3	0–8	0–2			0–1	1–2	2–1
Merw	0–1	0–1	0–2	1–0	1–0	2–1		1–0	2–0
Merw	0–1	1–0	1–8	1–1		2–0		2–1	0–1
Nebitçi	0–1	0–5	0–4	2–0	0–1	1–0	0–1		1–2
Nebitçi	0–2	2–2	1–5	1–0		1–1	1–1		2–1
Şagadam	0–2	0–3	1–2	1–0	2–0	1–0	3–0	1–2	
Şagadam	1–4	0–1	3–5	3–1		1–0	3–0	4–3	

Source: Soccerway
Legend: Blue = home team win; Yellow = draw; Red = away team win.

=== Results by round ===
Team ╲ Round	1	2	3	4	5	6	7	8	9	10	11	12	13	14	15	16	17	18	19	20	21	22	23	24	25	26	27	28	29	30	31	32
Ahal	W	W	W	L	L	W	P	W	L	W	W	W	L	D	W	P	W	W	W	W	W	L	W	W	W	W	W	W	L	L	W	W
Altyn Asyr	L	L	P	W	W	W	W	W	W	W	L	P	W	D	W	W	W	W	W	L	W	W	L	W	W	L	L	W	D	W	W	W
Arkadag	P	W	W	W	W	W	W	W	W	P	W	W	W	W	W	W	W	W	W	W	W	W	W	W	W	W	W	W	W	W	W	W
Aşgabat	D	W	W	L	L	L	L	L	P	W	W	L	W	L	L	L	L	P	L	L	D	D	L	L	L	L	D	W	W	L	L	W
Energetik	L	L	D	P	L	L	L	L	L	L	L	D	P	L	L	L	L	W	P	P	P	P	P	P	P	P	P	P	P	P	P	P
Köpetdag Aşgabat	D	P	D	L	L	L	L	L	W	L	P	D	W	L	L	L	W	L	D	L	D	L	L	L	L	L	L	L	W	L	L	L
Merw	W	L	L	W	W	P	W	L	L	W	L	W	L	W	P	L	L	L	L	W	L	D	W	L	L	W	D	L	L	W	L	L
Nebitçi	L	W	L	L	P	L	W	W	W	L	L	L	L	P	L	W	L	L	D	L	L	L	W	L	W	W	D	L	D	L	L	L
Şagadam	W	L	L	W	W	W	L	P	L	L	W	L	L	W	W	W	P	L	L	W	L	W	L	W	L	L	D	L	L	W	W	L

W = Win; D = Draw; L = Loss; P = Postponed

== Season statistics ==
=== Top scorers ===
As of matches played 27 December 2024

Rank	Player	Team	Goals
1	(Turkmenistan) Didar Durdyýew	Arkadag	31
2	(Turkmenistan) Altymyrat Annadurdyýew	Arkadag	24
3	(Turkmenistan) Begench Akmammedov	Arkadag	19
4	(Turkmenistan) Elman Tagaýew	Ahal	15
4	(Turkmenistan) Şanazar Tirkişow	Arkadag	15
6	(Turkmenistan) Arslan Saparow	Altyn Asyr	14
7	(Turkmenistan) Myrat Annaýew	Altyn Asyr	12
8	(Turkmenistan) Hydyrgeldi Atdžanow	Şagadam	11
9	(Turkmenistan) Röwşengeldi Halmämmedow	Altyn Asyr	10
9	(Turkmenistan) Arslanmyrat Amanow	Arkadag	10

=== Hat-tricks ===
Player	For	Against	Result	Date	Ref
(Turkmenistan) Didar Durdyýew	Arkadag	Köpetdag	5–0 (H)	6 April 2024	
(Turkmenistan) Didar Durdyýew	Arkadag	Merw	9–0 (H)	17 April 2024	
(Turkmenistan) Begench Akmammedov	Arkadag	Merw	9–0 (H)	17 April 2024	
(Turkmenistan) Altymyrat Annadurdyýew	Arkadag	Nebitçi	4–0 (A)	4 May 2024	
(Turkmenistan) Didar Durdyýew	Arkadag	Aşgabat	7–1 (H)	11 May 2024	
(Turkmenistan) Didar Durdyýew	Arkadag	Ahal	5–1 (H)	4 September 2024	
(Turkmenistan) Resul Khozhaev	Arkadag	Köpetdag	5–1 (H)	18 September 2024	
(Turkmenistan) Didar Durdyýew	Arkadag	Köpetdag	8–0 (A)	26 November 2024	
(Turkmenistan) Begench Akmammedov	Arkadag	Altyn Asyr	4–0 (A)	9 December 2024	
(Turkmenistan) Arslan Saparov	Altyn Asyr	Köpetdag	4–0 (H)	27 December 2024	

=== Red cards ===
As of match played 29 December 2024

- (Turkmenistan) Arslan Yollyev – Altyn Asyr vs Şagadam (4 March 2024)
- (Turkmenistan) Begmurad Arbatov – Şagadam vs Nebitçi (7 March 2024)
- (Turkmenistan) Murad Dadaev – Şagadam vs Aşgabat (29 March 2024)
- (Turkmenistan) Khydyr Yakubov – Şagadam vs Aşgabat (29 March 2024)
- (Turkmenistan) Begmurad Pirkuliev – Şagadam vs Aşgabat (29 March 2024)
- (Turkmenistan) Movlamberdy Goshshanov – Şagadam vs Aşgabat (29 March 2024)
- (Turkmenistan) Dayanch Nuryev – Nebitçi vs Ahal (6 April 2024)
- (Turkmenistan) Serdar Annamamedov – Merw vs Şagadam (13 April 2024)
- (Turkmenistan) Myrat Aşyrow – Altyn Asyr vs Energetik (17 April 2024)
- (Turkmenistan) Mukhamed Shykhyev – Energetik vs Nebitçi (20 April 2024)
- (Turkmenistan) Serdar Gulyev – Merw vs Nebitçi (23 April 2024)
- (Turkmenistan) Guvanch Berdymuradov – Ahal vs Merw (1 May 2024)
- (Turkmenistan) Shirmurad Bayramov – Merw vs Energetik (11 May 2024)
- (Turkmenistan) Shokhrat Aydogdyev – Ahal vs Nebitçi (14 May 2024)
- (Turkmenistan) Farid Kamaletdinov – Energetik vs Altyn Asyr (22 May 2024)
- (Turkmenistan) Gurbangeldy Batyrov – Altyn Asyr vs Nebitçi (4 September 2024)
- (Turkmenistan) Dovletmurad Seitmukhammedov – Köpetdag vs Merw (14 September 2024)
- (Turkmenistan) Wezirgeldi Ylýasow – Nebitçi vs Şagadam (14 September 2024)
- (Turkmenistan) Khojanazar Gurbanov – Nebitçi vs Şagadam (14 September 2024)
- (Turkmenistan) Aly Khaydarov – Şagadam vs Merw (18 September 2024)
- (Turkmenistan) Arslanmyrat Amanow – Arkadag vs Nebitçi (7 October 2024)
- (Turkmenistan) Farhad Italmazow – Nebitçi vs Merw (16 October 2024)
- (Turkmenistan) Gochmyrat Kakageldiev – Ahal vs Köpetdag (25 October 2024)
- (Turkmenistan) Gochmyrat Kakageldiev – Aşgabat vs Merw (7 November 2024)
- (Turkmenistan) Shokhrat Aydogdyev – Arkadag vs Nebitçi (30 November 2024)
- (Turkmenistan) Murad Annayev – Altyn Asyr vs Ahal (14 September 2024)
- (Turkmenistan) Ibragim Amangeldyev – Altyn Asyr vs Ahal (14 September 2024)

== Awards ==
=== Monthly awards ===
Month	Player of the month		References
Month	Player	Team	References
August	(Turkmenistan) Rovshengeldy Khalmamedov	Altyn Asyr	
September	(Turkmenistan) Mihail Titow	Altyn Asyr	
October	(Turkmenistan) Elman Tagaýew	Ahal	
November	(Turkmenistan) Shanazar Tirkishov	Arkadag	

=== Annual awards ===
Award	Winner	Team
League Manager of the Season	(Turkmenistan) Wladimir Baýramow	FC Arkadag
League Player of the Season	(Turkmenistan) Elman Tagaýew	FC Ahal
League Best Young player of the Season	(Turkmenistan) Enwer Annaýew	FC Arkadag

Team of the Year
Goalkeeper	(Turkmenistan) Rüstem Ahallyýew (Arkadag)			
Defenders	(Turkmenistan) Güýçmyrat Annagulyýew (Arkadag)	(Turkmenistan) Ybraýym Mämmedow (Arkadag)	(Turkmenistan) Abdy Bäşimow (Arkadag)	(Turkmenistan) Şöhrat Söýünow (Altyn Asyr)
Midfielders	(Turkmenistan) Elman Tagaýew (Ahal)		(Turkmenistan) Welmyrat Ballakow (Arkadag)	(Turkmenistan) Resul Hojaýew (Arkadag)
Forwards	(Turkmenistan) Şanazar Tirkişow (Arkadag)		(Turkmenistan) Altymyrat Annadurdyýew (Arkadag)	(Turkmenistan) Didar Durdyýew (Arkadag)

== Overall ==
- Most wins – FK Arkadag (30)
- Fewest losses – FK Arkadag (0)
- Most goals scored – FK Arkadag (147)
- Fewest goals conceded – FK Arkadag (20)

== Attendances ==
The average league attendance was 192. Attendance remained low throughout the season. A notable example was a top-of-the-table match between defending champions Altyn Asyr and league leaders Köpetdag, which attracted an estimated 300 spectators at the 20,000-capacity Ashgabat Stadium.

#	Club	Average
1	Arkadag	332
2	Altyn Asyr	278
3	Ahal	212
4	Köpetdag	173
5	Merw	167
6	Şagadam	132
7	Nebitçi	127
8	Aşgabat	121
