= List of football stadiums in Turkmenistan =

Stadiums in Turkmenistan

This is a list of football stadiums in Turkmenistan. The list includes venues used for professional football and other stadiums with a capacity over 1,500. The largest non-football stadiums in Turkmenistan is the 10,000-capacity indoor ice hockey arena named Winter Sports Complex Ashgabat.

== Current stadiums ==
Image	Stadium	Capacity	City	Region	Home team	Ref
	Ashgabat Olympic Stadium	45,000	Ashgabat	Ashgabat	Turkmenistan national football team FK Arkadag (selected matches)	
	Köpetdag Stadium	26,000	Ashgabat	Ashgabat	Köpetdag FK; Turkmenistan national football team	
	Ashgabat Stadium	20,000	Ashgabat	Ashgabat	FC Ahal; Turkmenistan national football team	
	Daşoguz Sport Complex	10,000	Daşoguz	Daşoguz Region	Turan FK	
	Buzmeyin Sport Complex	10,000	Ashgabat	Büzmeýin District, Ashgabat	FC Altyn Asyr	
	Änew Sport Complex	10,000	Änew	Ahal Region		
	Balkanabat Sport Toplumy	10,000	Balkanabat	Balkan Region	FC Nebitçi; Turkmenistan national football team	
	Arkadag Stadium	10,000	Arkadag	Arkadag	FK Arkadag	
	Türkmenabat Sport Toplumy	10,000	Türkmenabat	Lebap Region		
	Garaşsyzlyk Stadium	10,000	Daşoguz	Daşoguz Region		
	Mary Sport Toplumy	10,000	Mary	Mary Region	FC Merw	
	Şagadam Stadium	1,500	Türkmenbaşy	Balkan Region	Şagadam FK	
	Nusaý Stadium	3,000	Ashgabat	Ashgabat	FC Ashgabat	

== More stadiums ==
#	Image	Stadium	Capacity	City	Home team(s)	Opened
1		Energetik Stadium		Mary	FC Energetik Mary	
2		Sport mekdep-internatynyň sport desgasy		Babarap, Ahal Region	Ýokary Liga matches	

== See also ==
- List of association football stadiums by capacity
- List of association football stadiums by country
- List of football stadiums by capacity
- List of sports venues by capacity
- List of stadiums by capacity
- Lists of stadiums
- Football in Turkmenistan
