= Football in Turkmenistan =

- Country: Turkmenistan
- Governing body: Football Association of Turkmenistan
- National teams: Men's national team Women's national team Futsal national team Women's futsal national team

National competitions
- Ýokary Liga; Turkmenistan First League; Turkmenistan Cup; Turkmenistan Football Federation Cup

International competitions
- AFC Champions League 2 FIFA World Cup; Asian Cup

Football is the most popular sport in Turkmenistan, a country that gained independence in 1991. The national association regularly takes part in competitions organised by FIFA and the AFC at senior and youth level. Valeri Nepomniachi is probably the most famous name in Turkmen football. He was the coach who led Cameroon to the 1990 FIFA World Cup in Italy. The Africans surprised many with their 1–0 win over defending champions Argentina in the opening match and finally bowed out in the quarter-finals. There are 40 clubs, 820 players, and 30 referees in the country. The largest stadium by capacity in Turkmenistan is the 45,000-capacity Saparmurat Turkmenbashy Olympic Stadium.

== History of football in Turkmenistan ==
=== Soviet period ===
Football in Turkmenistan started to develop in the 1920s, however the sport became more organised when the first championship of the Turkmen SSR was held in 1937. From 1937 until 1991, the most successful clubs were Neftyanik Kvasnovodsk and Pogranichnik Ashkhabad, each having won six Turkmen SSR Championship titles.

Even though no team from the Turkmen SSR ever played in the Soviet Top League, several footballers did, of whom most notably are Valeri Broshin, Kurban Berdyev, Sergey Agashkov, Ravshan Muhadov, Dmitri Khomukha, Charyar Mukhadov and Vitaliy Kafanov.

The following Turkmenistani footballers had been members of USSR national football team:

Name	Position	Team	Caps(Goals)	Years
Valeri Broshin	Midfield	(Soviet Union) USSR	3(0)	1987–1990

=== Since independence ===
Following independence from the Soviet Union, Football Association of Turkmenistan was established in 1992, and has been a member of FIFA and AFC since 1994. The Ýokary Liga and Turkmenistan Cup were reestablished in 1992. Since 1995, Turkmenistan has hosted the annual international football tournament known as Turkmenistan President's Cup. Turkmenistani clubs also participate in the annual CIS Cup.

The Turkmenistan national football team success came in 1993, when it became runners up in the 1993 ECO Cup losing 2–1 to the host nation Iran. More success followed when the team reached the quarter-finals stage of the 1994 Asian Games. Ten years later, the national team qualified for its only appearance in the continental tournament the 2004 AFC Asian Cup, then came close again for qualifying when reached the final of the 2010 AFC Challenge Cup losing to North Korea eventual champions in penalty shootouts.

The most well known Turkmenistani football personalities are Kurban Berdyev (head coach of Rubin Kazan, Champions of the Russian Premier League in 2008 and 2009) and Ashgabat-born Rolan Gusev (Russian national team footballer 2000-2005).

In March 2019, the Football Federation of Turkmenistan named Croatian Ante Miše to lead the national team, together with Sandro Tomić, signing one-year contract.

== League system ==
Level	League(s)/Division(s)
1	Ýokary Liga; 9 clubs ↓↑ 1 club
2	Birinji Liga; 30 clubs

== Football stadiums in Turkmenistan ==
#	Stadium	Capacity	City	Tenants	Image
1	Saparmurat Turkmenbashy Olympic Stadium	45,000	Ashgabat		
2	Köpetdag Stadium	26,503	Ashgabat	FK Köpetdag Aşgabat	
3	Ashgabat Stadium	20,000	Ashgabat	FC Ashgabat; FC Altyn Asyr; Ahal FK; Turkmenistan national football team	
4	Sport Toplumy Stadium	10,000	Balkanabat	Balkan FK	
5	Arkadag Stadium	10,000	Arkadag	FK Arkadag	

== Most successful clubs overall ==
As of 2 August 2026

local and lower league organizations are not included.

Club	Domestic Titles						Worldwide Titles	Overall titles
Club	Ýokary Liga	Turkmenistan Cup	Turkmenistan Super Cup	Federation Cup	Turkmenistan President's Cup	Total	AFC Challenge League	Overall titles
Altyn Asyr	**8**	5	**8**	1	2	**24**	-	**24**
Köpetdag	6	**7**	-	-	3	16	-	16
Ýedigen	4	2	3	-	3	12	**1**	13
Nebitçi	4	4	3	-	-	11	**1**	12
Arkadag	3	3	3	**2**	-	11	**1**	12
Nisa	4	1	-	-	**4**	9	-	9
Ahal Änew	1	4	1	1	-	7	-	7
Aşgabat	2	-	1	1	-	4	-	4
Şagadam	1	2	-	-	-	3	-	3
Merw Mary	-	2	1	-	-	3	-	3
Bagtyyarlyk-Lebap	-	1	-	-	-	1	-	1
Turan	-	1	-	-	-	1	-	1

- The articles in italic indicate the defunct leagues and the defunct cups.
- The figures in **bold** indicate the most times this competition has been won by a team.

== Attendances ==
The average attendance per top-flight football league season and the club with the highest average attendance:

Season	League average	Best club	Best club average
2024	192	Arkadag	332

Source: League page on Wikipedia

== See also ==
- Lists of stadiums
