= 2023 Ýokary Liga =

Ýokary Liga
- Season: 2023
- Dates: 14 April – 29 December
- Champions: FK Arkadag (1st title)
- AFC Champions League Two: Altyn Asyr
- AFC Challenge League: FK Arkadag
- Matches: 62
- Goals: 191 (3.08 per match)
- Top goalscorer: Didar Durdyýew (27)
- Biggest home win: Arkadag 5–0 Nebitçi (13 May 2023); Nebitçi 6–1 Aşgabat (12 August 2023); Altyn Asyr 6–1 Köpetdag (19 August 2023); Altyn Asyr 7–2 Aşgabat (26 August 2023); Arkadag 6–1 Energetik (20 September 2023)
- Biggest away win: Köpetdag 0–4 Arkadag (25 April 2023); Energetik 1–5 Arkadag (17 May 2023); Aşgabat 0–4 Ahal (23 August 2023)
- Highest scoring: Altyn Asyr 7–2 Aşgabat (26 August 2023)
- Longest winning run: Arkadag (24)
- Longest unbeaten run: Arkadag (24)
- Longest winless run: Arkadag (24)
- All statistics correct as of 20 September 2023.

The 2023 Ýokary Liga was the 31st edition of the top tier professional Yokary Liga football annual competition in Turkmenistan administered by the Football Federation of Turkmenistan.

The champions were determined on the 23rd matchday, played on 3rd December 2023. FK Arkadag claimed their first championship title, defeating FC Altyn Asyr by 4–0. FK Arkadag won the Liga in 2023 without dropping a single point. This feat came within a 24 matches winning streak, from 18 April to 20 December 2023, a national record. Altyn Asyr finished second to Arkadag.

== Season events ==
Prior to the start of the season, the Football Federation of Turkmenistan announced that the Liga season would consist of 9 teams, consist of three rounds, and begin on 14 April.

== Teams ==
9 teams contested in the Liga – the top 8 teams from the previous season and a new FK Arkadag

Team	Location	Venue	Capacity
Arkadag	Arkadag	Nusaý Stadium; Arkadag Stadium	3,000; 10,000
Ahal	Anau (Ahal Region)	Ashgabat Stadium	20,000
Altyn Asyr	Ashgabat	Buzmeyin Sport Complex	10,000
Aşgabat	Ashgabat	Ashgabat Stadium	20,000
Nebitçi	Balkanabat	Balkanabat Sport Complex (Balkan Region)	10,000
Energetik	Saparmyrat Türkmenbaşy, Mary District (Mary Region)	Energetik Stadium (Mary)	1,000
Köpetdag Aşgabat	Ashgabat	Köpetdag Stadium	26,000
Merw	Mary (Mary Region)	Mary Sport Complex	10,000
Şagadam	Türkmenbaşy (Balkan Region)	Şagadam Stadium	5,000

== Personnel and sponsoring ==
Team	Manager/head coach	Captain	Kit manufacturer	Sponsor
Arkadag	(Turkmenistan) Wladimir Baýramow	(Turkmenistan) Arslanmyrat Amanow	Jako	Arkadag City
Ahal	(Turkmenistan) Serdar Geldiýew		Hummel	TNÖ
Altyn Asyr	(Turkmenistan) Ýazguly Hojageldiýew		Nike	TM CELL
Aşgabat	(Turkmenistan) Said Seýidow		Jako	
Nebitçi	(Turkmenistan) Amanmyrat Meredow		Jako	
Energetik	(Turkmenistan) Rahmanguly Baýlyýew		Kelme	
Köpetdag Aşgabat	(Turkmenistan) Tofik Şükürow		Nike	
Merw	(Turkmenistan) Witaliý Alikperow	(Turkmenistan) Merdan Saparow	Jako	Türkmengaz
Şagadam	(Turkmenistan) Aleksandr Klimenko		Joma	

== Regular season ==
=== League table ===
Pos	Team	Pld	W	D	L	GF	GA	GD	Pts	Qualification or relegation
1	Arkadag (Note: Arkadag only had an AFC Challenge League license, so couldn't compete in the AFC Champions League Two like Ýokary Liga winners usually do.) (C)	24	24	0	0	83	17	+66	72	Qualification for AFC Challenge League group stage
2	Altyn Asyr	24	17	3	4	57	26	+31	54	Qualification for AFC Champions League Two Playoffs
3	Nebitçi	24	13	4	7	41	31	+10	43	
4	Ahal	24	12	2	10	41	32	+9	38	
5	Aşgabat	24	9	3	12	35	51	−16	30	
6	Köpetdag Aşgabat	24	8	4	12	31	49	−18	28	
7	Energetik	24	5	2	17	16	46	−30	17	
8	Şagadam	24	3	5	16	16	41	−25	14	
9	Merw	24	3	5	16	17	44	−27	14	

Updated to match(es) played on 27 December 2023. Source: Soccerway, TFF
Rules for classification: 1) Points; 2) Head-to-head points; 3) Head-to-head goal difference; 4) Head-to-head goals scored; 5) Goal difference; 6) Goals scored.
(C) Champions

=== Results ===
Home \ Away	AHA	ALT	ARK	ASG	ENE	KOP	MER	NEB	SAG	AHA	ALT	ARK	ASG	ENE	KOP	MER	NEB	SAG
Ahal		0–2	2–3	0–2	1–0	1–2	4–0	2–0	2–2				2–1	3–1	3–1		2–2	
Altyn Asyr	1–2		1–2	7–2	3–0	6–1	4–1	0–0	4–0	2–1			4–0		5–1		2–1	
Arkadag	5–2	4–1		2–0	6–1	3–2	2–1	5–0	4–0	2–1	4–0					6–0		3–2
Aşgabat	0–4	0–1	2–4		1–0	2–1	2–2	1–3	1–1			1–4		1–1		2–0		3–0
Energetik	0–1	2–4	1–5	0–1		0–2	0–2	2–4	1–0		1–2	0–2				1–0		0–0
Köpetdag Aşgabat	1–3	1–1	0–4	1–4	1–2		4–1	1–0	2–1			0–3	1–3	2–1			2–2	
Merw	2–1	0–1	0–3	0–1	0–1	2–2		1–2	2–0	0–1	1–1				0–1		1–1	
Nebitçi	1–0	0–1	0–2	6–1	3–0	2–1	2–0		2–1			0–4	4–2	2–0				2–0
Şagadam	1–0	1–2	0–1	3–2	0–1	0–1	0–0	0–2		29 Dec	1–2				0–0	2–1		

Updated to match(es) played on 27 December 2023. Source: Soccerway
Legend: Blue = home team win; Yellow = draw; Red = away team win.

=== Results by round ===
Team ╲ Round	1	2	3	4	5	6	7	8	9	10	11	12	13	14	15	16	17	18
Ahal	W	L	L	L	L	L	L	P	L	P	W	P	W	L	W	W		
Altyn Asyr	D	W	P	W	D	W	W	L	W	W	L	P	P	W	W	W		W
Arkadag	P	W	W	W	W	W	W	W	W	P	P	W	W	W	W	W		
Aşgabat	W	P	L	W	L	W	L	L	W	D	P	L	W	L	L	L	D	
Energetik	L	L	W	L	L	P	L	W	L	P	W	W	L	L	P	L	L	L
Köpetdag Aşgabat	W	W	L	W	D	D	P	W	L	W	L	L	L	L	P	P		
Merw	L	L	W	L	P	D	D	L	L	D	P	P	P	P	P	W	W	
Nebitçi	D	W	W	P	W	L	W	L	W	L	W	W	P	W	L	L		
Şagadam	L	L	L	L	W	L	D	W	P	L	L	L	L	W	L	L	D	

Updated to match(es) played on 20 September 2023. Source:
W = Win; D = Draw; L = Loss; P = Postponed

== Season statistics ==
=== Hat-tricks ===
Player	For	Against	Result	Date	Ref
(Turkmenistan) Didar Durdyýew	Arkadag	Energetik	5–2 (H)	26 May 2023	
(Turkmenistan) Rakhman Muratberdiev	Ahal	Köpetdag Aşgabat	6–1 (H)	19 August 2023	

- ^{4} Player scored 4 goals

== Overall ==
- Most wins – FK Arkadag (24)
- Fewest losses – FK Arkadag (0)
- Most goals scored – FK Arkadag (83)
- Fewest goals conceded – FK Arkadag (17)

== Top scorers ==
Rank	Player	Team	Goals
1	(Turkmenistan) Didar Durdyýew	FK Arkadag	27
2	(Turkmenistan) Wahyt Orazsähedow	FC Altyn Asyr	12
3	(Turkmenistan) Myrat Annaýew	FC Altyn Asyr	11
