= 2014 Ýokary Liga =

Ýokary Liga
- Season: 2014
- Champions: Altyn Asyr
- Relegated: Talyp Sporty; Lebap
- AFC Cup: HTTU; Ahal
- Matches: 180
- Goals: 576 (3.2 per match)
- Top goalscorer: Mämmedaly Garadanow (28)
- Biggest home win: Altyn Asyr 10–1 Daşoguz
- Biggest away win: Lebap 0–11 HTTU
- Highest scoring: Lebap 0–11 HTTU

2014 Ýokary Liga season was the 22nd edition of the top tier professional Yokary Liga football annual competition in Turkmenistan administered by the Football Federation of Turkmenistan. It began on 7 March 2014 with the first round and ended in November 2014.

== Teams ==
Location of teams in the Ýokary Liga 2014

Club	Location	Stadium	Capacity	Coach
Ahal	Abadan	Ahal Stadium	10,000	(Turkmenistan) Guwançmuhammet Öwekow
Altyn Asyr	Ashgabat	Köpetdag Stadium	26,000	(Turkmenistan) Ýazguly Hojageldiýew
Aşgabat	Ashgabat	Ashgabat Stadium	20,000	(Turkmenistan) Amanklyç Koçumow
Balkan	Balkanabat	Balkanabat Stadium	10,000	(Turkmenistan) Rahym Gurbanmämmedow
Daşoguz	Daşoguz	Daşoguz Stadium	10,000	(Turkmenistan) Ilgiz Abdyrahmanow
Talyp Sporty	Ashgabat	Ashgabat Stadium	20,000	(Turkmenistan) Baýram Durdyýew
HTTU Aşgabat	Ashgabat	HTTU Stadium	1,000	(Turkmenistan) Röwşen Meredow
Lebap	Türkmenabat	Türkmenabat Stadium	10,000	(Turkmenistan) Timur Husainow
Merw	Mary	Mary Stadium	10,000	(Turkmenistan) Magtym Begenjow
Şagadam	Türkmenbaşy	Şagadam Stadium	5,000	(Turkmenistan) Rejepmyrat Agabaýew

== League table ==
Pos	Team	Pld	W	D	L	GF	GA	GD	Pts	Qualification
1	Altyn Asyr (C)	36	29	5	2	91	25	+66	92	2015 AFC Cup Qualifying play-off
2	Ahal	36	28	3	5	85	24	+61	87	2015 AFC Cup Qualifying play-off
3	Şagadam	36	23	4	9	88	39	+49	73	
4	Merw	36	22	2	12	67	44	+23	68	
6	HTTU	36	16	4	16	80	45	+35	52	
5	Balkan	36	15	5	16	47	24	+23	50	
7	Aşgabat	36	13	7	16	57	47	+10	46	
8	Talyp Sporty (R)	36	6	7	23	24	70	−46	25	Relegation to the 2015 Birinji Ligasy
9	Daşoguz	36	5	2	29	22	95	−73	17	
10	Lebap (R)	36	2	3	31	18	166	−148	9	Relegation to the 2015 Birinji Ligasy

Updated to match(es) played on 5 March 2015. Source: Ýokary Liga table
Rules for classification: 1) points; 2) goal difference; 3) number of goals scored.
(C) Champions; (R) Relegated

== Results ==
=== First half of season ===
Home \ Away	AHA	ALT	ASH	BAL	DAS	HTT	LEB	MER	SAG	TLP
Ahal		2–1	2–1	1–0	3–1	2–1	7–0	4–0	4–0	5–0
Altyn Asyr	3–0		5–2	4–1	3–0	1–1	6–0	1–0	3–1	3–1
Aşgabat	0–2	2–3		0–1	2–0	0–1	4–1	2–0	1–1	0–0
Balkan	1–2	0–1	1–0		3–0	2–0	5–0	2–0	0–0	3–0
Daşoguz	0–6	0–3	1–1	0–2		1–2	0–0	0–1	0–4	0–1
HTTU	0–1	1–2	1–0	1–0	8–1		7–0	3–0	0–1	0–0
Lebap	2–3	0–3	0–8	1–6	2–0	0–11		1–5	0–6	1–2
Merw	3–1	0–2	2–1	2–1	4–1	2–1	1–0		2–1	3–1
Şagadam	2–0	0–2	3–1	1–1	5–2	3–1	7–1	2–0		2–1
Talyp Sporty	0–2	0–2	0–2	0–0	3–1	0–2	1–0	0–0	0–2	

Updated to match(es) played on 9 July 2014. Source: Ýokary Liga match · Ýokary Liga results
Legend: Blue = home team win; Yellow = draw; Red = away team win.

=== Second half of season ===
Home \ Away	AHA	ALT	ASH	BAL	DAS	HTT	LEB	MER	SAG	TLP
Ahal		0–0	2–2	3–1	2–1	1–0	9–0	1–0	5–0	1–0
Altyn Asyr	2–1		4–0	3–0	6–1	2–1	3–0	2–1	3–4	6–0
Aşgabat	3–0	0–0		1–0	2–1	1–3	7–0	0–2	0–0	2–1
Balkan	0–3	0–0	1–2		2–0	3–1	0–3	2–0	1–0	3–0
Daşoguz	0–1	1–4	0–5	1–0		1–2	3–0	0–4	1–3	1–0
HTTU	2–5	1–2	4–1	1–0	6–1		7–0	2–3	1–2	4–0
Lebap	0–4	1–8	2–2	0–5	1–2	2–2		1–6	1–8	0–3
Merw	0–0	2–5	1–0	2–0	2–1	2–0	9–0		2–1	2–0
Şagadam	1–2	0–1	1–0	3–0	2–0	2–1	10–0	4–1		5–0
Talyp Sporty	0–1	1–1	1–5	0–0	0–2	1–1	5–1	1–3	1–4	

Updated to match(es) played on 5 March 2015. Source: Soccerway
Legend: Blue = home team win; Yellow = draw; Red = away team win.

== Top goal-scorers ==
The top scorers are: Updated to match played on 7 March 2014.

Rank	Player	Club	Goals (penalty)
1	Mämmedaly Garadanow	FC Şagadam	28(2)
2	Didar Durdiyev	FC Altyn Asyr	26(6)
3	Süleýman Muhadow	FC HTTU	25(1)

=== Scoring ===
- First goalscorer:
- First hat-trick:
