= 2019 Turkmenistan Cup =

Türkmenistanyň Kubogy 2019

Tournament details
- Country: Turkmenistan
- Teams: 9

Final positions
- Champions: FC Altyn Asyr (4th title)
- Runners-up: FC Ahal

The 2019 Turkmenistan Cup (Turkmen: Türkmenistanyň Kubogy 2019) is the 26th season of the Turkmenistan Cup knockout tournament. The cup winner qualifies for the 2020 AFC Cup.

The draw of the tournament was held on 6 July 2019. The competition started on 27 July 2019 and finished on 14 December 2019. The final match was played at the Nusaý Stadium in Ashgabat.

== First round ==
=== First leg ===
The first leg match will be played on 27 July 2019.

27 July 2019	Merw	5–0	Turkmennebit
		Report

=== Second leg ===
The second leg match will be played on 31 July 2019.

31 July 2019	Turkmennebit	0–1	Merw
		Report

== Quarter-finals ==
=== First legs ===
First legs were played on 13 and 15 August 2019.

13 August 2019	Altyn Asyr	1–0	Nebitçi
	Myrat Ýagşyýew	Report

15 August 2019	Energetik	0–2	Aşgabat
		Report

15 August 2019	Şagadam	0–0	Köpetdag
		Report

15 August 2019	Ahal	2–0	Merw
		Report

=== Second legs ===
Second legs were played on 18 September 2019.

18 September 2019	Nebitçi	1–2 (1–3 agg.)	Altyn Asyr	Balkanabat
		Report		Stadium: Sport Toplumy Stadium

18 September 2019	Aşgabat	1–1 (3–1 agg.)	Energetik	Nisa Stadium
		Report

18 September 2019	Köpetdag	1–0 (1–0 agg.)	Şagadam	Kopetdag Stadium
		Report

18 September 2019	Merw	0–0 (0–2 agg.)	Ahal	Sport toplumy (Mary)
		Report

== Semi-finals ==
=== First legs ===
First legs were played on 2 November 2019.

2 November 2019	Altyn Asyr	3–1	Ashgabat	Ashgabat
15:30 TMT	Nurmyradow 7' 68'; Saparow 44'	Report	Kadyrow 37'	Stadium: Ashgabat Stadium; Attendance: 300; Referee: Resul Mämmedow

2 November 2019	Köpetdag	0–2	Ahal	Ashgabat
16:00 TMT		Report	Saparmämmedow 61'; Sultanow 88'	Stadium: Kopetdag Stadium; Attendance: 500; Referee: Begenç Allaberdiýew

=== Second legs ===
Second legs were played on 3 and 4 December 2019.

3 December 2019	Ashgabat	2–1 (3–4 agg.)	Altyn Asyr	Ashgabat
15:00 TMT		Report		Stadium: Nisa Stadium

4 December 2019	Ahal	1–0 (3–0 agg.)	Köpetdag	Ashgabat
15:00 TMT		Report		Stadium: Ashgabat Stadium

== Final ==
Final was played on 14 December 2019.

14 December 2019	Altyn Asyr	3–0	Ahal	Ashgabat
14:30 TMT	Serdar Geldiýew Mihail Titow Begençmyrat Myradow	Report		Stadium: Nisa Stadium; Attendance: 500; Referee: Jumamyrat Jumamyradow

== Top goalscorers ==
As of 15 December 2019

Rank	Player	Club	Goals
1	(Turkmenistan) Gahrymanberdi Çoňkaýew	Köpetdag	2
1	(Turkmenistan) Begenç Guldurdyýew	Merw	2
1	(Turkmenistan) Selim Nurmyradow	Altyn Asyr FK	2
1	(Turkmenistan) Pirmyrat Sultanow	Ahal FK	2
1	(Turkmenistan) Begenç Guldurdyýew	Merw FK	2
1	(Turkmenistan) Serdar Geldiýew	Altyn Asyr FK	2
