= 2017 Ýokary Liga =

Ýokary Liga
- Season: 2017
- Champions: Altyn Asyr
- Relegated: none
- Matches: 135
- Goals: 396 (2.93 per match)

2017 Ýokary Liga season was the 25th edition of the top tier professional Yokary Liga football annual competition in Turkmenistan administered by the Football Federation of Turkmenistan. It ran from March to December 2017.

Three times title winner Altyn Asyr successfully defended its 2016 title winning the 2017 title.

== Format changes ==
Yedigen were denied an entry for the 2017 season, and any team from Birinji liga obtain a license for the 2017 season. 9 teams contested for the title. Exceptionally there will be no relegation at the end of the season.

== Teams ==
9 teams contested in the league.

Club	Location	Stadium	Capacity	Coach
Ahal	Ahal Province	Ashgabat Stadium	20,000	(Turkmenistan) Ali Gurbani
Altyn Asyr	Ashgabat	Ashgabat Stadium	20,000	(Turkmenistan) Ýazguly Hojageldiýew
Aşgabat	Ashgabat	Ashgabat Stadium	20,000	(Turkmenistan) Tofik Şukurow
Balkan	Balkanabat	Sport Toplumy Stadium	10,000	(Turkmenistan) Aleksandr Klimenko
Turan	Dashoguz	Sport toplumy (Daşoguz) Stadium	10,000	
Energetik	Mary	Baýramaly Sport Desgasy	2,000	(Turkmenistan) Rahym Gurbanmämmedow
Köpetdag Aşgabat	Ashgabat	Köpetdag Stadium	26,000	(Turkmenistan) Said Seýidow
Merw	Mary	Sport Toplumy Stadium	10,000	(Turkmenistan) Magtym Begenjow
Şagadam	Türkmenbaşy	Şagadam Stadium	5,000	(Turkmenistan) Rejepmyrat Agabaýew

== League table ==
Pos	Team	Pld	W	D	L	GF	GA	GD	Pts	Qualification
1	Altyn Asyr	32	25	4	3	83	24	+59	79	Qualifies for the 2018 AFC Cup Group Stage
2	FC Ahal	32	22	6	4	70	21	+49	72	Qualifies for the 2018 AFC Play-off Stage
3	Shagadam	32	19	3	10	55	32	+23	60	
4	Balkan	32	14	5	13	54	47	+7	47	
5	Ashgabat	32	13	6	13	32	44	−12	45	
6	Energetik Türkmenbaşy	32	11	5	16	45	47	−2	38	
7	Kopetdag	32	9	6	17	35	55	−20	33	
8	Merw	32	10	3	19	34	61	−27	33	
9	Turan	32	1	2	29	12	89	−77	5	

Updated to match(es) played on 12 December 2017. Source: Soccerway FIFA
Rules for classification: 1) points; 2) goal difference; 3) number of goals scored.
