= Ahmet Ataýew =

Turkmen footballer

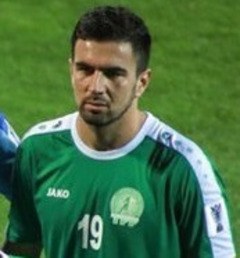

Personal information
- Full name: Ahmet Didarovich Atayev
- Date of birth: 19 September 1990 (age 36)
- Place of birth: Ashgabat, Turkmenistan
- Height: 1.85 m (6 ft 1 in)
- Position: Midfielder

Team information
- Current team: FK Arkadag
- Number: 88

Senior career*
Years	Team	Apps	(Gls)
2007–2010	FC Talyp Sporty	32	(2)
2010–2011	Ashgabat	6	(0)
2011–2013	HTTU	48	(5)
2014–2017	Altyn Asyr	50	(5)
2017–2018	Arema	25	(3)
2018	Persela Lamongan	6	(0)
2019	Sabah	8	(1)
2020–2024	Altyn Asyr	56	(8)

International career
2012–	Turkmenistan	39	(1)
- * Club domestic league appearances and goals

Ahmet Didarovich Atayev or Ahmet Didarowiç Ataýew (Turkmen Cyrillic: Ахмет Дидарович Атаев; Russian: Ахмед Дидарович Атаев, romanized: Akhmed Didarovich Atayev; born 19 September 1990) is a Turkmen professional footballer who plays as a midfielder for Ýokary Liga club FK Arkadag and the Turkmenistan national team.

== Club career ==
He started playing football at 6 years old. His first coach was Atamyrat Jumamuradov, in Youth sport school of Bagyr (Ahal Region).

He began his professional career in Ashgabat; from 2007 to 2010 he played for FC Talyp Sporty.

The first half of the 2011 season was held in FC Aşgabat. The second part of the 2011 season, he played for FC HTTU, which included winning the Cup of Turkmenistan for the first time. In 2013, he became the first champion 2013 Ýokary Liga.

Since 2014, Ataýew has played for Altyn Asyr FK. As part of the team, he won the title of champion of Turkmenistan in 2014 and 2015, the 2015 Turkmenistan Cup, and the 2015 Turkmenistan Super Cup. At the end of the 2015 season, Ataýew was voted the best player of 2015 Ýokary Liga.

From August 2017, he began performing in Indonesia's Super League for the Arema, which included 25 games and scored 3 goals. In June 2018 moved to the new Indonesian club Persela, which he played for until the end of the 2018 year.

On 15 May 2019, Ataýew signed by Malaysian Premier League club Sabah FA as one of two imports to fill their vacant player slots. Ataýew became part of the team squad that emerged as the champion of 2019 Malaysia Premier League since the team last lifted their old first division title back in 1996, subsequently qualifying them into the 2020 Malaysia Super League. In the team match against Kelantan FA, Ataýew notably scored the winning goal from a ball given by his teammate through corner kick in the 58th minute.

== International career ==
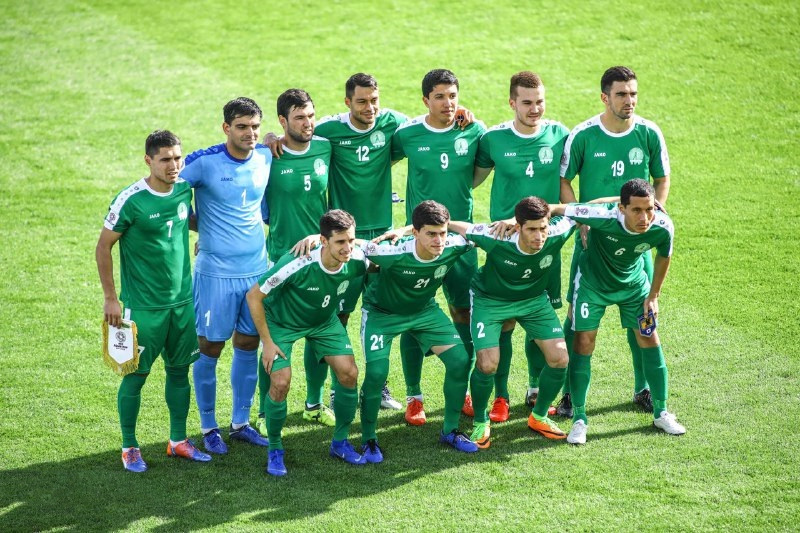
№19 Ataýew at 2019 AFC Asian Cup with Turkmenistan national football team.

He played for the Olympic team of Turkmenistan in the Asian Football Confederation's Pre-Olympic Tournament.

Ataýew made his senior national team debut on 27 January 2012, in a friendly match against Romania. The captain of the national team from 2015.

In December 2018, he was included in the squad for the 2019 AFC Asian Cup. On 9 January, in the first match of the group stage against Japan, he scored in the 79th minute from a penalty kick. Turkmenistan ultimately lost the match 2–3.

=== International goals ===
Scores and results list Turkmenistan's goal tally first.

No.	Date	Venue	Opponent	Score	Result	Competition
1.	9 January 2019	Al Nahyan Stadium, Abu Dhabi, United Arab Emirates	Japan	2–3	2–3	2019 AFC Asian Cup

== Honors ==
Altyn Asyr

- Ýokary Liga: 2014, 2015
- Turkmenistan Cup: 2015
- Turkmenistan Super Cup: 2015

HTTU

- Ýokary Liga: 2013
- Turkmenistan Cup: 2011

Sabah

- Malaysia Premier League: 2019

FK Arkadag

- AFC Challenge League: 2024–25

Turkmenistan

- AFC Challenge Cup runner-up: 2012

Individual

- Best player of Ýokary Liga: 2015

=== State medals ===
- Medal For the love of the Fatherland (2025)
