= 2020 Turkmenistan Cup =

Türkmenistanyň Kubogy 2020

Tournament details
- Country: Turkmenistan
- Teams: 8

Final positions
- Champions: FC Altyn Asyr

The 2020 Turkmenistan Cup (Turkmen: Türkmenistanyň Kubogy 2020) was the 27th season of the Turkmenistan Cup knockout tournament. The cup winner qualifies for the 2021 AFC Cup. The draw of the tournament was held on 13 July 2020. The competition started on 27 October 2020 and finished in December 2020.

== Bracket ==
The eight teams of the 2020 Ýokary Liga entered the competition.

Quarter-finals
1	Ahal (p)	0	0	0 (4)
8	Aşgabat	0	0	0 (2)
4	Altyn Asyr	7	3	10
5	Energetik	0	0	0
2	Köpetdag	2	1	3
7	Merw	0	0	0
3	Şagadam	4	2	6
6	Nebitçi	2	2	4

Semi-finals
Ahal	0	2	2
Altyn Asyr	2	6	8
Köpetdag	6	0	6
Şagadam	1	1	2

Final
Altyn Asyr	1 (3)
Köpetdag	1 (0)

== Quarter-finals ==
=== First legs ===
First legs will be played on 27 and 28 October 2020.

27 October 2020	Ahal	0–0	Aşgabat	Anau
		Report		Stadium: Ashgabat Stadium

28 October 2020	Altyn Asyr	7–0	Energetik	Ashgabat
		Report		Stadium: Şagadam Stadium

27 October 2020	Köpetdag	2–0	Merw	Ashgabat
		Report		Stadium: Köpetdag Stadium

28 October 2020	Şagadam	4–2	Nebitçi	Türkmenbaşy
		Report		Stadium: Nusaý Stadium

=== Second legs ===
Second legs will be played on 6 and 7 November 2020

7 November 2020	Aşgabat	0–0 (0–0 agg.) (2–4 p)	Ahal
		Report

7 November 2020	Energetik	0–3 (0–10 agg.)	Altyn Asyr
		Report

6 November 2020	Merw	0–1 (0–3 agg.)	Köpetdag	Balkanabat
		Report		Stadium: Sport toplumy

7 November 2020	Nebitçi	2–2 (4–6 agg.)	Şagadam	Balkanabat
		Report		Stadium: Sport toplumy

== Semi-finals ==
=== First legs ===
First legs were played on 1 December 2020.

1 December 2020	Ahal	0–2	Altyn Asyr

1 December 2020	Köpetdag	6–1	Şagadam

=== Second legs ===
Second legs will be played on 5 December 2020.

5 December 2020	Altyn Asyr	6–2 (8–2 agg.)	Ahal

5 December 2020	Şagadam	1–0 (2–6 agg.)	Köpetdag

== Final ==
9 December 2020	Altyn Asyr	1–1 (3–0 p)	Köpetdag
