= 2016 Ýokary Liga =

Ýokary Liga
- Season: 2016
- Champions: Altyn Asyr
- Relegated: Yedigen
- AFC Cup: Altyn Asyr; Balkan

2016 Ýokary Liga season was the 24th edition of the top tier professional Yokary Liga football annual competition in Turkmenistan administered by the Football Federation of Turkmenistan. It began in March and ended in December 2016.

Altyn Asyr were the defending champions of the 2015 Ýokary Liga season.

Altyn Asyr were crowned champions for the third time in their history beating Balkan with 23 points. Altyn Asyr also won Turkmenistan Cup; Balkan received the second AFC Cup-ticket

== Teams ==
A total of 10 teams will contest the league, including 9 sides from the 2015 season and the champion of the Birinji liga, Köpetdag Aşgabat.

Club	Location	Stadium	Capacity	Coach
Ahal	Ahal Province	Ashgabat Stadium	20,000	(Turkmenistan) Ali Gurbani
Altyn Asyr	Ashgabat	Ashgabat Stadium	20,000	(Turkmenistan) Ýazguly Hojageldiýew
Aşgabat	Ashgabat	Ashgabat Stadium	20,000	(Turkmenistan) Tofik Şukurow
Balkan	Balkanabat	Sport Toplumy Stadium	10,000	(Turkmenistan) Aleksandr Klimenko
Turan	Dashoguz	Sport toplumy (Daşoguz) Stadium	10,000	
Yedigen	Ashgabat	HTTU Stadium	1,000	(Turkmenistan) Röwşen Meredow
Energetik	Mary	Baýramaly Sport Desgasy	2000	(Turkmenistan) Rahym Gurbanmämmedow
Köpetdag Aşgabat	Ashgabat	Köpetdag Stadium	26,000	(Turkmenistan) Said Seýidow
Merw	Mary	Sport Toplumy Stadium	10,000	(Turkmenistan) Magtym Begenjow
Şagadam	Türkmenbaşy	Şagadam Stadium	5,000	(Turkmenistan) Rejepmyrat Agabaýew

== League table ==
Pos	Team	Pld	W	D	L	GF	GA	GD	Pts	Qualification or relegation
1	Altyn Asyr (C, Q)	36	30	5	1	108	19	+89	95	Qualifies for the 2017 AFC Cup Group Stage
2	Balkan (Q)	36	22	6	8	42	37	+5	72	Qualifies for the 2017 AFC Play-off Stage
3	Energetik Türkmenbaşy	36	20	7	9	54	39	+15	67	
4	FC Ahal	36	18	8	10	63	42	+21	62	
5	Merw	36	17	6	13	42	36	+6	57	
6	Ashgabat	36	14	10	12	43	38	+5	52	
7	Kopetdag	35	11	6	18	37	63	−26	39	
8	Shagadam	36	8	8	20	20	38	−18	32	
9	Yedigen (R)	36	6	4	26	22	31	−9	22	Relegation to the 2017 Birinji Ligasy (Note: Yedigen were denied an entry for the 2017 season and have to play in the Birinji liga, therefore Turan avoided relegation and were admitted to participate in the 2017 season.)
10	Turan	36	2	4	30	18	105	−87	10	Avoided relegation

Updated to match(es) played on 24 December 2016. Source: Soccerway
Rules for classification: 1) points; 2) goal difference; 3) number of goals scored.
(C) Champions; (Q) Qualified for the phase indicated; (R) Relegated
