= Arslanmyrat Amanow =

Turkmen footballer

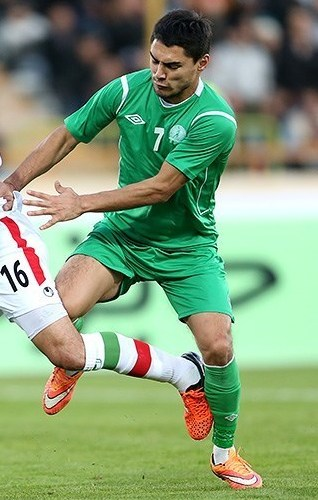
- Amanov with Turkmenistan in 2015

Personal information
- Full name: Arslanmyrat Amanmyradowiç Amanow
- Date of birth: 28 March 1990 (age 36)
- Place of birth: Baýramaly, Turkmen SSR, Soviet Union
- Height: 1.75 m (5 ft 9 in)
- Position: Attacking midfielder

Team information
- Current team: Arkadag (president)

Senior career*
Years	Team	Apps	(Gls)
2007–2009	Ashgabat		
2010–2012	Ýedigen		
2012	Okzhetpes	11	(1)
2013	Ýedigen		
2014	Irtysh	24	(1)
2015–2016	Olmaliq	54	(8)
2017	Altyn Asyr	10	(1)
2018	Buxoro	29	(5)
2019	Lokomotiv Tashkent	23	(4)
2020	AGMK	23	(2)
2021	Sogdiana	11	(0)
2021–2023	Ahal		
2024	Arkadag		

International career
2009–2024	Turkmenistan	63	(14)
- * Club domestic league appearances and goals

Arslanmyrat Amanmyradowiç Amanow (born 28 March 1990) is a former Turkmen professional footballer who played as a winger and attacking midfielder. Throughout career, he played for teams in Turkmenistan, Kazakhstan and Uzbekistan. He currently holds the position of president of FK Arkadag, following his appointment in November 2024.

At international level, Amanow scored 14 goals in 63 appearances for Turkmenistan between 2009 and 2024. Amanow is also the Turkmenistan national team's most-capped player. He represented Turkmenistan at the 2019 AFC Asian Cup.

== Personal life ==
Arslanmyrat Amanow was born at Baýramaly in Mary Region. He started playing football at the School of Sports of Ashgabat.

== Club career ==
He started his professional career in 2007, FC Ashgabat, where he played for the first two years. From 2010 to 2012, he played for FC HTTU. Also during 2012, he played 11 matches and scored one goal in Kazakh club FC Okzhetpes.

During 2013, he returned to HTTU. In March 2014, Amanov signed for Kazakhstan Premier League side FC Irtysh Pavlodar. After one season with Irtysh, Amanov left the club in December 2014. He played 24 matches as part of this club and scored 1 goal.

In 2015–2016, he played for Uzbek club Olmaliq, played 54 matches and managed to score 8 goals. In 2017, he played for the FC Altyn Asyr. In 2018, he signed for another Uzbek club FK Buxoro. On 31 January 2019 it was announced that he had signed for Uzbek champions PFC Lokomotiv Tashkent.

In the winter of 2020, Amanov signed a one-year contract with FC AGMK, in which he had already played in 2015 and 2016. In January 2021, he signed with FC Sogdiana Jizzakh. In July 2021, his contract with Sogdiana was terminated by mutual consent. He returned to homeland Turkmenistan, and joined FC Ahal. In the first match of the Turkmenistan championship against Kopetdag on 23 October 2021, he made his debut in official matches for FC Ahal. He won the Ýokary Liga with Ahal in 2022. Following the 2022 season, he was included in the list of the best players of the year.

Since April 2024, he has played for the newly formed club FK Arkadag. He retired from professional football in November 2024.

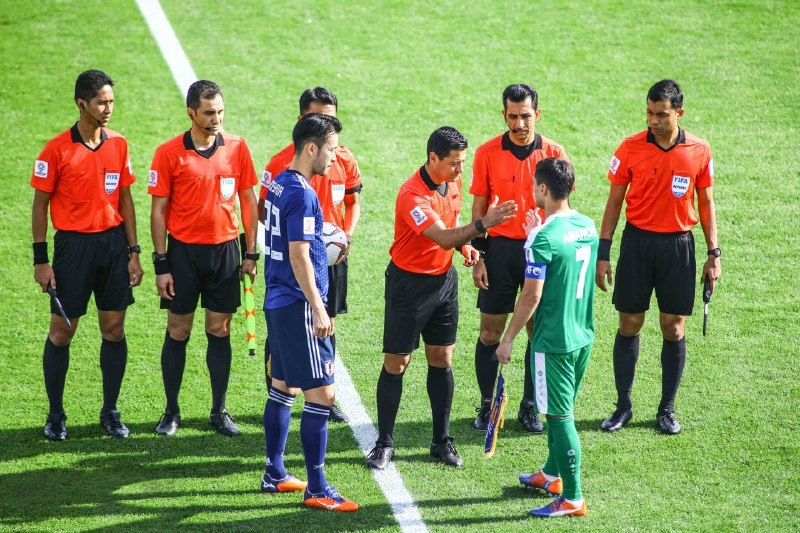
Arslanmyrat Amanov at 2019 AFC Asian Cup with Japanese Maya Yoshida

== International career ==
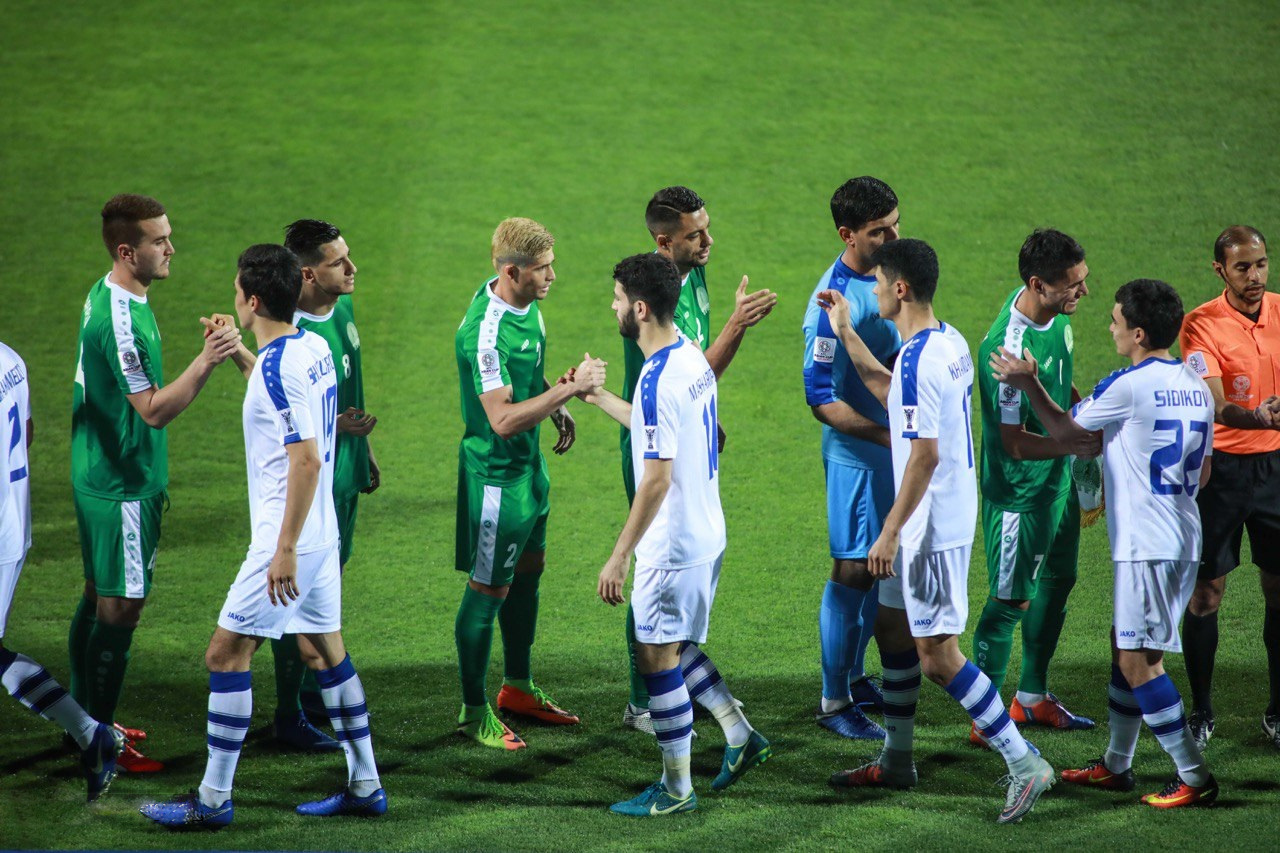
Turkmenistan & Uzbekistan Group F match, 2019 AFC Asian Cup

Since 2009, he has played for the national team of Turkmenistan. He scored in the game against Tajikistan in 2010 AFC Challenge Cup Semi final.

Until now, he has played 53 games in his team and scored 10 goals meaning he holds the record for the most international caps of any Turkmen player. One of the vice-captains of the team.

In December 2018, he was included in the bid for the Asian Cup 2019. On 9 January, in the first match of the group stage against Japan, he scored the opening goal from in the 27th minute of the game. As a result, the Turkmenistan national team lost 2–3.

== Executive roles ==
In November 2024, Amanow was appointed chairman of football club Arkadag.

== Career statistics ==
=== International ===
Turkmenistan national team
Year	Apps	Goals
2009	2	0
2010	4	1
2011	5	1
2012	6	2
2013	2	1
2014	1	0
2015	6	2
2016	3	1
2017	6	0
2018	3	1
2019	7	4
2021	2	0
2022	6	1
2023	1	0
Total	54	14

Statistics accurate as of match played 23 March 2023

=== International goals ===
Scores and results list Turkmenistan's goal tally first.

No.	Date	Venue	Opponent	Score	Result	Competition
1.	24 February 2010	Sugathadasa Stadium, Colombo	Tajikistan	1–0	2–0	2010 AFC Challenge Cup
2.	21 March 2011	MBPJ Stadium, Petaling Jaya	Pakistan	2–0	3–0	2012 AFC Challenge Cup qualification
3.	8 March 2012	Halchowk Stadium, Kathmandu	Maldives	3–1	3–1	2012 AFC Challenge Cup
4.	16 March 2012	Dasarath Rangasala Stadium, Kathmandu	Philippines	1–1	2–1	2012 AFC Challenge Cup
5.	22 March 2013	Rizal Memorial Stadium, Manila	Cambodia	1–0	7–0	2014 AFC Challenge Cup qualification
6.	3 September 2015	Al-Seeb Stadium, Seeb	Oman	1–3	1–3	2018 FIFA World Cup qualification
7.	8 October 2015	Köpetdag Stadium, Ashgabat	India	2–1	2–1	2018 FIFA World Cup qualification
8.	29 March 2016	Jawaharlal Nehru Stadium, Kochi	India	1–1	2–1	2018 FIFA World Cup qualification
9.	28 December 2018	Miracle Resort Hotel, Antalya	Afghanistan	2–2	2–2	Friendly
10.	9 January 2019	Al Nahyan Stadium, Abu Dhabi	Japan	1–0	2–3	2019 AFC Asian Cup
11.	5 September 2019	Colombo Racecourse, Colombo	Sri Lanka	2–0	2–0	2022 FIFA World Cup qualification
12.	15 October 2019	Jaber Al-Ahmad International Stadium, Kuwait City	Kuwait	1–0	1–1	Friendly
13.	14 November 2019	Köpetdag Stadium, Ashgabat	North Korea	2–0	3–1	2022 FIFA World Cup qualification
14.	11 June 2022	Bukit Jalil National Stadium, Kuala Lumpur	Bangladesh	2–1	2–1	2023 AFC Asian Cup qualification

== Honours ==
Ahal

- Ýokary Liga: 2023

Aşgabat

- Ýokary Liga: 2007, 2008

HTTU

- Ýokary Liga: 2013
- Turkmenistan Cup: 2011

Lokomotiv Tashkent

- Uzbekistan Super Cup: 2019

Turkmenistan

- AFC Challenge Cup runner-up: 2010, 2012

=== Orders ===
- Medal For the love of the Fatherland (2025)
