= Elman Tagaýew =

Turkmenistani footballer

Personal information
- Full name: Elman Şamsidinowiç Tagaýew
- Date of birth: June 2, 1989 (age 37)
- Place of birth: Kyzyl-Arvat, Turkmen SSR, Soviet Union
- Height: 5 ft 7 in (1.70 m)
- Position: Midfielder

Team information
- Current team: FC Ahal
- Number: 7

Senior career*
Years	Team	Apps	(Gls)
–2012	Aşgabat		(0)
2012–2013	AZAL	8	(0)
2013–2014	Aşgabat		(0)
2014–2016	Altyn Asyr		(0)
2016	Andijon	12	(0)
2017	Altyn Asyr	22	(0)
2017–2018	Sabail	25	(2)
2019	Navbahor	3	(0)
2019–	FC Ahal	31+	(35+)

International career^{‡}
2012–	Turkmenistan	23	(4)
- * Club domestic league appearances and goals as of 18 November 2025 ‡ National team caps and goals as of 25 March 2025

Elman Tagaýew (born June 2, 1989 in Kyzyl-Arvat) is a Turkmen professional football midfielder of Azerbaijani descent. He plays for Ýokary Liga club FC Ahal and the Turkmenistan national team.

== Biography ==
Tagaýew was born in Ashgabat, Turkmenistan to an Azerbaijani family. He began playing football at eight years old. In 2014, he married his wife Arina. In 2015, they had two twin sons named Alan and Ali.

== Career ==
=== Club ===
Tagaýew started his career at Aşgabat before going on trial with Khazar Lankaran in early 2012. During his trial with Khazar Lankaran he appeared as a substitute, and scored, against Turkmenistan. Khazar declined to sign Tagaýew due to the players attitude during a game. Tagaýew went on to sign for AZAL in the summer of 2012, but only made 8 appearances before leaving in March 2013.

In June 2017, Tagayev signed a one-year contract with newly-promoted Azerbaijan Premier League team Səbail FK. Tagayev was released by Sabail FK at the end of the 2017–18 season.

=== International ===
Elman Tagaýew played for the Turkmenistan national under-23 football team at the 2010 Asian Games in Guangzhou.

Tagaýew's first international goal came against Nepal in the 2012 AFC Challenge Cup group stage. As part of the national team of Turkmenistan, he became the finalist of the 2012 AFC Challenge Cup.

== Career statistics ==
=== Club ===
As of match played 20 May 2018

Appearances and goals by club, season and competition
Club	Season	League			National Cup		Continental		Other		Total	
Club	Season	Division	Apps	Goals	Apps	Goals	Apps	Goals	Apps	Goals	Apps	Goals
AZAL	2012–13	Azerbaijan Premier League	8	0	0	0	–		–		8	0
Aşgabat	2013	Ýokary Liga					–		–			
Aşgabat	2014	Ýokary Liga					–		–			
Aşgabat	Total						-	-	-	-		
Altyn Asyr	2014	Ýokary Liga					–		–			
Altyn Asyr	2015	Ýokary Liga					0	0	–			
Altyn Asyr	2016	Ýokary Liga					3	0	–		3	0
Altyn Asyr	Total						3	0	-	-	3	0
Andijon	2016	Uzbek League	12	0	0	0	–		–		12	0
Altyn Asyr	2017	Ýokary Liga					1	0	–		1	0
Səbail	2017–18	Azerbaijan Premier League	25	2	2	1	–		–		9	2
Career total			45	2	2	1	4	0	-	-	51	3

=== International ===
Turkmenistan national team
Year	Apps	Goals
2012	4	1
2013	0	0
2014	0	0
2015	0	0
2016	2	0
2017	1	0
2018	0	0
2019	0	0
2020	—	
2021	1	0
2022	2	0
2023	5	0
2024	2	0
2025	3	3
Total	23	4

Statistics accurate as of match played 18 November 2025

=== International goals ===
#	Date	Venue	Opponent	Score	Result	Competition
1.	12 March 2012	Dasarath Rangasala Stadium, Kathmandu, Nepal	Nepal	1–0	3–0	2012 AFC Challenge Cup
2.	25 March 2025	National Stadium, Kaohsiung, Taiwan	Chinese Taipei	1–0	2–1	2027 AFC Asian Cup qualification
3.	14 October 2025	Arkadag Stadium, Arkadag, Turkmenistan	Sri Lanka	1–0	2–1	2027 AFC Asian Cup qualification
4.	18 November 2025	Arkadag Stadium, Arkadag, Turkmenistan	Chinese Taipei	2–1	3–1	2027 AFC Asian Cup qualification

== Honours ==
Turkmenistan

- AFC Challenge Cup runner-up: 2012

Individual

- Football Federation of Turkmenistan Footballer of the Year: 2021, 2024
- Ýokary Liga Top Goalscorer: 2021 (10 goals)
