= Süleýman Muhadow =

Turkmen footballer (born 1993)

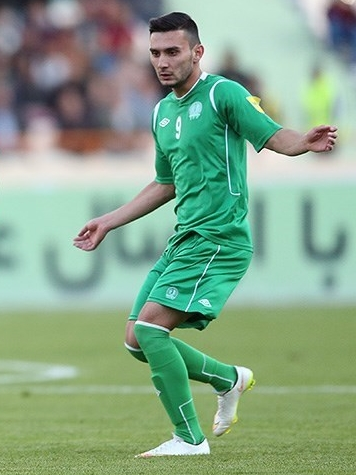
- Muhadow with Turkmenistan in 2015

Personal information
- Full name: Süleýman Çariýarowiç Muhadow
- Date of birth: 24 December 1993 (age 32)
- Place of birth: Ashgabat, Turkmenistan
- Height: 1.77 m (5 ft 10 in)
- Position: Striker

Team information
- Current team: Abdysh-Ata Kant
- Number: 99

Senior career*
Years	Team	Apps	(Gls)
2012–2014	HTTU Aşgabat		(48)
2015–2017	Altyn Asyr		(30)
2017	Şagadam Türkmenbaşy		
2018	Ahal		(17)
2023	CSKA Pamir Dushanbe	6	(0)
2023	Dordoi Bishkek	4	(0)
2024–	Abdysh-Ata Kant		

International career^{‡}
	Turkmenistan U21	8	(3)
2012–2019	Turkmenistan	17	(4)
- * Club domestic league appearances and goals as of 31 July 2023 ‡ National team caps and goals as of 17 November 2015

Süleýman Çariýarowiç Muhadow (born 24 December 1993 in Ashgabat, Turkmenistan) is a professional Turkmen football player who plays for Abdysh-Ata Kant. He is the son of former Turkmen international footballer Çaryýar Muhadow.

== Club career ==
A graduate of the football school Olimp Ashgabat, he began his career at HTTU Aşgabat. In 2013, he won the Turkmenistan Super Cup followed by the Eskişehir Cup 2013. At the end of the season he won the gold medal in the 2013 Ýokary Liga and was the second top scorer of Turkmenistan (23 goals).

On 6 May 2014 he made his debut in the 2014 AFC President's Cup against Tatung F.C. and scored 2 goals. Afterwards he scored once against Rimyongsu Sports Club and, in the third match, scored twice against Ceres. On 7 June 2014 he scored five times against FC Daşoguz in the Championship of Turkmenistan. In the final stage of the 2014 AFC President's Cup he scored a hat-trick against Manang Marshyangdi Club (3–1) and scored 2 goals against «Sri Lanka Air Force» (2–1). In the cup final he scored the winning goal against Rimyongsu Sports Club (2–1) and won the trophy for the first time, as well as being recognized as tournament MVP and top scorer (11 goals). He was the third top scorer of the 2014 Ýokary Liga (25 goals).

In 2015, he moved to FC Altyn Asyr and on 10 February 2015 he made his debut for the club in the 2015 AFC Cup against Al-Saqr.

At the beginning of 2019, Muhadow featured for FC Istiklol during their preseason training camp in Turkey, playing in a match against HB Køge. In April, he was interested in Indonesian Persib Bandung. However, in August 2019 Muhadow was banned by the AFC for four years for a doping violation at the 2019 AFC Asian Cup.

On 31 March 2023, Muhadow was announced as a member of CSKA Pamir Dushanbe's squad for the 2023 season. On 18 July 2023, CSKA Pamir announced that Muhadow had left the club.

In February 2025, FC Altyn Asyr Ashgabat announced the signing of Muhadow.

== International career ==
Participated in the 2013 Commonwealth of Independent States Cup for the U19 national team.

Muhadow made his senior national team debut on 24 October 2012 against Vietnam. Muhadow scored his first international goal on 28 October 2012 against Laos.

== Career statistics ==
=== International ===
Turkmenistan national team
Year	Apps	Goals
2012	2	1
2013	1	0
2014	3	1
2015	7	2
2016	1	0
2017	0	0
Total	14	4

Statistics accurate as of match played 9 November 2016

=== International goals ===
#	Date	Venue	Opponent	Score	Result	Competition
1.	28 October 2012	Thống Nhất Stadium, Ho Chi Minh City, Vietnam	Laos		4–2	2012 AFC Challenge Cup
2.	22 May 2014	Addu Football Stadium, Addu City, Maldives	Afghanistan	1–2	1–3	2014 AFC Challenge Cup
3.	5 November 2015	Mohammed Bin Zayed Stadium, Abu Dhabi, UAE	United Arab Emirates	1–2	1–5	Friendly
4.	17 November 2015	Kopetdag Stadium, Ashgabat, Turkmenistan	Oman	2–0	2–1	2018 FIFA World Cup qualifier

== Honours ==
HTTU Aşgabat

- Ýokary Liga: 2013
- AFC President's Cup: 2014

Individual

- AFC President's Cup top scorer: 2014
- AFC President's Cup Most Valuable Player: 2014
