= Didar Durdyýew =

Turkmen footballer

Personal information
- Full name: Didar Gurbangeldyýewiç Durdyýew
- Date of birth: 16 July 1993 (age 33)
- Place of birth: Balkanabat, Balkan Region Turkmenistan
- Position: Forward

Team information
- Current team: Arkadag
- Number: 11

Senior career*
Years	Team	Apps	(Gls)
2012	Ahal	21	(14)
2013–2014	Altyn Asyr	52	(41)
2015	Hazyna		
2016	Altyn Asyr		
2017	Aşgabat		
2018–2019	Ahal	15	(14)
2020	Mash'al	5	(0)
2021–2022	Ahal	28	(27)
2023–	FK Arkadag	92	(93)

International career
2012–	Turkmenistan	28	(4)
- * Club domestic league appearances and goals

Didar Gurbangeldiyevich Durdyyev (Turkmen: Didar Gurbangeldiýewiç Durdyýew; born 16 July 1993) is a Turkmen professional footballer, who plays as a forward for Ýokary Liga club FK Arkadag and the Turkmenistan national football team.

== Biography ==
He was a pupil of the football school Olimp Aşgabat and a Student of the Turkmen State Institute of Economics and Management. Didar Durdyýew's father, Gurbangeldi, is also a former Turkmenistani footballer who played for the national team.

== Club career ==
He began his career in the football club FC Ahal and was the third top scorer of Turkmenistan in 2012 (14 goals).

He won the gold medal in the 2014 Ýokary Liga with Altyn Asyr FK, and was the second top scorer (26 goals). In February 2015, he played his last match with FC Altyn Asyr; in the AFC Cup against Al-Saqr.

Since March 2015, he has played for FC Hazyna.

In January 2020, Durdyýew went on trial with Kazakhstan First Division club FC Aktobe.

In March 2020, he signed a contract with the Uzbek club Mash'al Mubarek. On 7 March 2020, Durdyýew made his debut in the Uzbekistan Super League in a 1–0 loss against FC Bunyodkor. In August 2020 leaves club.

In March 2021, Durdyýew returned to FC Ahal.

Durdyýew's 27 league goals saw him finish the season as the top scorer in the 2022 Ýokary Liga and helped to FC Ahal win the championship of Turkmenistan for the first time in history.

== International career ==
He played for Turkmenistan U22 in the 2013 Commonwealth of Independent States Cup.

Durdyýew made his senior national team debut in 2012 AFC Challenge Cup. He scored two goals against Laos in a 5–1 victory in the 2014 AFC Challenge Cup.

== Career statistics ==
=== Club ===
Club	Season	Division	League		Cup		Continental		Total	
Club	Season	Division	Apps	Goals	Apps	Goals	Apps	Goals	Apps	Goals
Ahal	2012	Ýokary Liga	21	14					21	14
Ahal	2018	Ýokary Liga	3	4			8	0	11	4
Ahal	2019	Ýokary Liga	15	14	4	1	4	1	23	16
Ahal	2021	Ýokary Liga					1	0	1	0
Ahal	2022	Ýokary Liga	28	27	4	5	4	0	36	32
Ahal	Total		67	59	8	6	17	1	92	66
Altyn Asyr	2013	Ýokary Liga	18	15	1	1			19	16
Altyn Asyr	2014	Ýokary Liga	34	26					34	26
Altyn Asyr	2015	Ýokary Liga					1	0	1	0
Altyn Asyr	Total		52	41	1	1	1	0	54	42
Mash'al	2020	Uzbekistan Super League	5	0					5	0
Arkadag	2023	Ýokary Liga	23	19	4	8			27	27
Arkadag	2024	Ýokary Liga	29	31	1	1	7	1	37	33
Arkadag	2025	Ýokary Liga	26	26	7	8	5	1	38	35
Arkadag	2026	Ýokary Liga	23	24	2	2	4	0	29	26
Arkadag	Total		101	100	14	19	16	2	131	121
Total career			225	200	23	26	34	3	282	229

=== International ===
As of match played 31 March 2026

Appearances and goals by national team and year
National team	Year	Apps	Goals
Turkmenistan	2012	2	0
Turkmenistan	2013	–	
Turkmenistan	2014	3	2
Turkmenistan	2015	2	0
Turkmenistan	2016	1	0
Turkmenistan	2017	–	
Turkmenistan	2018	–	
Turkmenistan	2019	6	0
Turkmenistan	2020	–	
Turkmenistan	2021	–	
Turkmenistan	2022	–	
Turkmenistan	2023	2	0
Turkmenistan	2024	6	1
Turkmenistan	2025	5	1
Turkmenistan	2026	1	0
Total		28	4

Scores and results list Turkmenistan's goal tally first, score column indicates score after each Durdyýew goal.

List of international goals scored by Didar Durdyýew
No.	Date	Venue	Opponent	Score	Result	Competition
1	20 May 2014	Addu Football Stadium, Addu City, Maldives	Laos	2–1	5–1	2014 AFC Challenge Cup
2	20 May 2014	Addu Football Stadium, Addu City, Maldives	Laos	4–1	5–1	2014 AFC Challenge Cup
3	1 June 2024	Arslan Zeki Demirci Sports Complex, Manavgat, Turkey	Greenland	4–0	5–0	Friendly
4	2 September 2015	Olympic City Stadium, Tashkent, Uzbekistan	Uzbekistan	1–2	1–2	2025 CAFA Nations Cup

== Honours ==
Ahal

- Ýokary Liga: 2022
- Turkmenistan Cup: 2022

Arkadag

- Ýokary Liga: 2023, 2024
- Turkmenistan Cup: 2023
- AFC Challenge League: 2024–25
- Turkmenistan Super Cup: 2024, 2025

Turkmenistan

- AFC Challenge Cup runner-up: 2012

Individual

- Ýokary Liga top scorer: 2019, 2022, 2023, 2024

=== State medals ===
- Medal For the love of the Fatherland (2025)
