= Sport toplumy =

Sport toplumy may refer to the following sports stadiums in Turkmenistan:

- Sport toplumy (Abadan) or Buzmeyin Sport Complex, home of FC Altyn Asyr
- Sport toplumy (Balkanabat), home of Balkan FK
- Sport toplumy (Daşoguz), home of FC Daşoguz
- Sport toplumy (Mary), home of FC Merw
