= 2017 Turkmenistan Cup =

Tournament details
- Country: Turkmenistan

Final positions
- Champions: Ahal FK
- Runners-up: Şagadam FK

The 2017 Turkmenistan Cup (Turkmen: Türkmenistanyň Kubogy 2017) is the 24th season of the Turkmenistan Cup knockout tournament. The cup winner qualifies for the 2018 AFC Cup.

The draw of the tournament was held on 10 July 2017.

== Round 1 ==
=== 1st leg ===
27 July 2017	Köpetdag	2–1	Turan

=== 2nd leg ===
30 July 2017	Turan	1–2	Köpetdag

== Quarter-finals ==
=== 1st leg ===
2 August 2017	Balkan	1–3	Ahal

2 August 2017	Aşgabat	0–1	Altyn Asyr

2 August 2017	Merw	1–1	Energetik

2 August 2017	Şagadam	1–1	Köpetdag

=== 2nd leg ===
8 August 2017	Ahal	4–3	Balkan

8 August 2017	Altyn Asyr	2–1	Aşgabat

8 August 2017	Energetik	2–0	Merw

8 August 2017	Köpetdag	0–3	Şagadam

== Semi-finals ==
=== 1st leg ===
13 October 2017	Akhal	1–0	Altyn Asyr

13 October 2017	Energetik	0–2	Shagadam

=== 2nd leg ===
16 October 2017	Altyn Asyr	0–0	Akhal

16 October 2017	Shagadam	2–2	Energetic

== Final ==
28 October 2017
16:00 UTC+5

Ahal FK	4–0	Şagadam FK
	Report

Köpetdag Stadium, Ashgabat
Referee: Babanazar Haknazarov

== See also ==
- 2017 Ýokary Liga
