= Turkmenistan Super Cup =

- Founded: 2005
- Region: Turkmenistan
- Teams: 2
- Current champions: Arkadag (3rd title) (2026)
- Most championships: Altyn Asyr (8 titles)
- 2026 Turkmenistan Super Cup

The Turkmenistan Super Cup (Turkmen: Türkmenistanyň Naýbaşy Kubogy) is an annual one-match association football competition in Turkmenistan organized by the Football Federation of Turkmenistan. This competition serves as the season opener and is played between the Ýokary Liga Champions and the Turkmenistan Cup Winners of the previous season. If a single team holds both titles, the Cup runners-up are invited.

== History ==
The Turkmenistan Super Cup was first contested in 2005. In the inaugural match, the HTTU Aşgabat defeated Merw Mary 4–1.

== Winners & Results ==
Year	Date	Winner	Score	Runner-up	Venue
2005	4 December 2005	HTTU Aşgabat	4–1	Merw Mary	Nebitçi Stadium, Balkanabat
2006	7 December 2006	Nebitçi FT	3–2	HTTU Aşgabat	Merw Stadium (Mary),
2007		FC Aşgabat	1–1 (3–2 pen.)	Şagadam Türkmenbaşy	
2008		Merw Mary	3–2	FC Aşgabat	
2009	21 November 2009	HTTU Aşgabat	3–0	FC Altyn Asyr	Olympic Stadium (Ashgabat),
2011	June 2011	FC Balkan	4–2	FC Altyn Asyr	
2012	4 April 2012	FC Balkan	1–1 (2–1 a.e.t.)	HTTU Aşgabat	Abadan Sport Complex, Abadan, Ahal Region
2013	5 April 2013	HTTU Aşgabat	1–1 (4–3 pen.)	FC Balkan	Türkmenabat Sport Complex, Türkmenabat , Lebap Region
2014	1 March 2014	FC Ahal	4–2	HTTU Aşgabat	Ashgabat Stadium
2015	28 October 2015	Altyn Asyr FK	3–0	Ahal FK	Kopetdag Stadium,
2016	28 February 2016	Altyn Asyr FK	2–1	Şagadam Türkmenbaşy	Ashgabat Stadium,
2017	1 March 2017	Altyn Asyr FK	2–1	FC Aşgabat	Ashgabat Stadium,
2018	20 June 2018	Altyn Asyr FK	1–0	Ahal FK	Kopetdag Stadium,
2019	3 August 2019	Altyn Asyr FK	2–0	Köpetdag Aşgabat	Kopetdag Stadium,
2020	29 September 2020	Altyn Asyr FK	1–1 (5–4 pen.)	Ahal FK	Ashgabat Stadium,
2021	23 November 2021	Altyn Asyr FK	2–0	Köpetdag Aşgabat	Ashgabat Stadium,
2022	23 December 2022	Altyn Asyr FK	3–1	Şagadam FK	Nusaý Stadium,
2024	4 December 2024	Arkadag	3–1	Ahal	Balkanabat Sport Complex, Balkanabat
2025	26 September 2025	Arkadag	3–0	Ahal	Nusaý Stadium, Ashgabat
2026	2 August 2026	Arkadag	3–0	Ahal	Nusaý Stadium, Ashgabat

== Performance by club ==
Club	Wins	Runners-up	Winning years	Losing Years
FC Altyn Asyr	8	2	2015, 2016, 2017, 2018, 2019, 2020, 2021, 2022	2009, 2011
HTTU Aşgabat	3	3	2005, 2009, 2013	2006, 2012, 2014
Nebitçi FT	3	1	2006, 2011, 2012	2013
Arkadag	3	–	2024, 2025, 2026	–
FC Ahal	1	5	2014	2015, 2018, 2020, 2024, 2025, 2026
FC Aşgabat	1	2	2007	2008, 2017
Merw Mary	1	1	2008	2005
Şagadam Türkmenbaşy	–	3	–	2007, 2016, 2022
Kopetdag	–	2	–	2019, 2021
