= 2016 Turkmenistan Cup =

Tournament details
- Country: Turkmenistan

Final positions
- Champions: Altyn Asyr FK
- Runners-up: FC Aşgabat

The 2016 Turkmenistan Cup (Turkmen: Türkmenistanyň Kubogy 2016) was the 23rd season of the Turkmenistan Cup knockout tournament. The cup winner qualified for the 2017 AFC Cup.

== Quarter-finals ==
First Legs [Sep 13]
Altyn Asyr    3-1 Şagadam       
Energetik     0-0 Merw          
Balkan        2-1 Köpetdag      
Ahal          1-1 Aşgabat

Second Legs [Sep 20]
Şagadam       0-1 Altyn Asyr    
Merw          0-2 Energetik     
Köpetdag      1-1 Balkan        
Aşgabat       1-1 Ahal          [6-5 pen]

== Semi-finals ==
First Legs [Oct 4]
Balkan        0-1 Aşgabat       
Altyn Asyr    5-0 Energetik

Second Legs [Oct 7]
Aşgabat       3-0 Balkan        
Energetik     4-1 Altyn Asyr

== Final ==
Final [Oct 28, Daşoguz]
Altyn Asyr    4-0 Aşgabat

== See also ==
- 2016 Ýokary Liga
- 2016 Turkmenistan First League
