= 2011 Turkmenistan President's Cup =

2011 Turkmenistan President’s Cup
Prezident Kubogy 2011

Tournament details
- Host country: Turkmenistan
- Dates: 20 February - 28 February
- Teams: 8 (from 2 confederations)
- Venue(s): 2 (in 2 host cities)

Eight teams from five countries participated in the 17th edition of the Turkmenistan President's Cup, which took place in Ashgabat's Olympic Stadium and Abadan Stadium between February 20 and 28 2011. The group toppers clashed in the final and stood to win $20,000 while the runners-up got half that amount. The third-placed team received $5,000.

== Participating teams ==
Team	Qualifying method
(Turkmenistan) FC Balkan	2010 Ýokary Liga winners
(Turkmenistan) FC Altyn Asyr	2010 Ýokary Liga runners-up
(Russia) Anzhi Makhachkala	2010 Russian Premier League 11th place
(Iran) Oghab Gonbad	
(Russia) FC Sheksna Cherepovets	Russian Second Division 5th
(Armenia) FC Gandzasar	2010 Armenian Premier League 6th place
(Tajikistan) Regar-TadAZ	2010 Tajik League runners-up
(Turkmenistan) Merw Mary	2010 Ýokary Liga 4th place
