= Serdar Geldiýew =

Turkmen footballer

Personal information
- Full name: Serdar Orazmuhammedowiç Geldiýew
- Date of birth: October 1, 1987 (age 39)
- Place of birth: Aşgabat, Turkmen SSR, Soviet Union
- Height: 1.85 m (6 ft 1 in)
- Position: Midfielder

Senior career*
Years	Team	Apps	(Gls)
2005–2006	HTTU		
2007–2009	Ashgabat		
2010	Balkan		
2011–2012	Ashgabat		
2013–2014	Ahal		
2015–2019	Altyn Asyr		
2020	PDRM FA	11	(1)
2021–2023	Ahal	?	(?)

International career^{‡}
2011–2019	Turkmenistan	24	(0)
- * Club domestic league appearances and goals as of 01:00, 14 January 2022 (UTC) ‡ National team caps and goals as of 01:00, 14 January 2022 (UTC)

Serdar Orazmuhammedowiç Geldiýew (born October 1, 1987) is a retired professional Turkmen footballer and coach who is the Secretary General of the Turkmenistan Football Federation. Geldiýew was also a Turkmenistan men's international having made her senior international debut in 2008.

== Club career ==
Serdar Geldiýew began his career in 2005 at the Ashgabat-based FC HTTU. Over the years, he played for Turkmen clubs such as FC Ashgabat, FC Balkan, FC Altyn Asyr, and FC Ahal.

In 2020 he moved to the championship of Malaysia. This is his first foreign club in his career. In 2020 he moved to the championship of Malaysia. This is his first foreign club in his career. On 1 March 2020, Geldiyev made his debut in the 2020 Malaysia Super League in a 0–0 draw against Sabah FA.

In March 2021, Serdar Geldiýew signed a deal at his former club FC Ahal.

== International career ==
He played for the Olympic team of Turkmenistan at the Asian Games 2010 in Guangzhou.

Geldiýew made his debut for the Turkmenistan senior national team in 2008, friendly match against Oman.

== Coaching career ==
After finishing his playing career, he became a football coach. A holder of an AFC PRO-level coaching license, he managed the FC Ahal in 2023, leading the team to compete in the group stage of the 2023 AFC Champions League.

== Football administration ==
In December 2024 he was appointed as General Secretary at the Football Federation of Turkmenistan.

== Personal life ==
Son of Turkmen football coach Orazmuhammed Geldiyev. Younger brother, also a footballer for the Turkmenistan national team, Ata Geldiýew.

He is fluent in Turkmen, Russian and English.

== Honours ==
Altyn Asyr FK
Champion of Turkmenistan: 2015, 2016, 2017, 2018, 2019
