= Saparmurat Turkmenbashy Olympic Stadium =

Multi-purpose stadium in Ashgabat, Turkmenistan

Coordinates: 37°54′15.93″N 58°22′37.51″E

Ashgabat Olympic Stadium Aşgabat Olimpiýa Stadiony
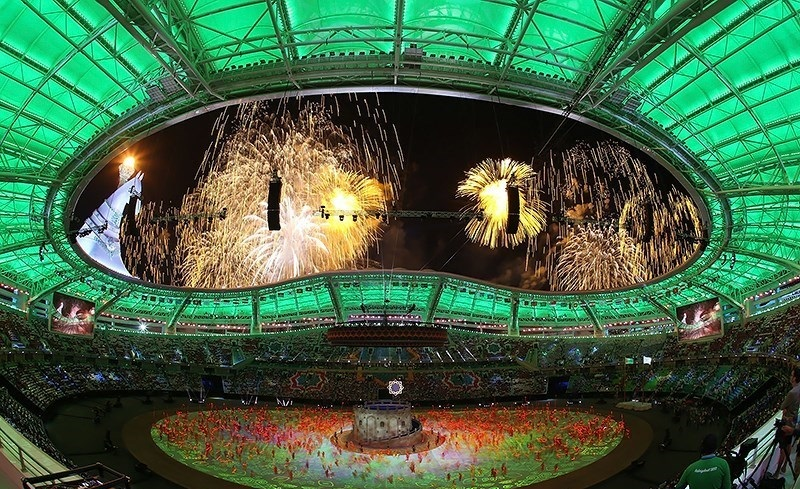
- Interior of the stadium during AIMAG 2017
- Interactive map of Ashgabat Olympic Stadium; Aşgabat Olimpiýa Stadiony
- Full name: Ashgabat Olympic Stadium
- Former names: Saparmurat Turkmenbashy; Olympic Stadium (2003–2013)
- Address: Ashgabat Olympic Complex, 7 Kopetdag District; 744000
- Location: Ashgabat, Turkmenistan
- Owner: Government of Ashgabat
- Operator: Management of the Olympic Town; Ashgabat City
- Capacity: 45,000
- Surface: Grass
- Record attendance: 45,000 (Arkadag v Al-Nassr, 11 February 2026)
- Public transit: Ashgabat Monorail

Construction
- Opened: 2003
- Renovated: 2013–2017
- Architect: AFL Architects / Arup
- General contractors: Mensel JV Consulting & Contracting Inc.

Tenants
- Turkmenistan national football team (selected matches); FK Arkadag (selected matches)

Website
- aoc.gov.tm/en/infrastructure

Ashgabat Olympic Stadium (Turkmen: Aşgabat Olimpiýa stadiony; (formerly known as the Saparmurat Turkmenbashy Olympic Stadium) is an outdoor multi-purpose stadium in Ashgabat, Turkmenistan. It opened in 2017 on the site of the original Olympic Stadium, which had stood from 2003 until 2013. The stadium is a part of the Ashgabat Olympic Complex located in Kopetdag District of Ashgabat.

== History ==
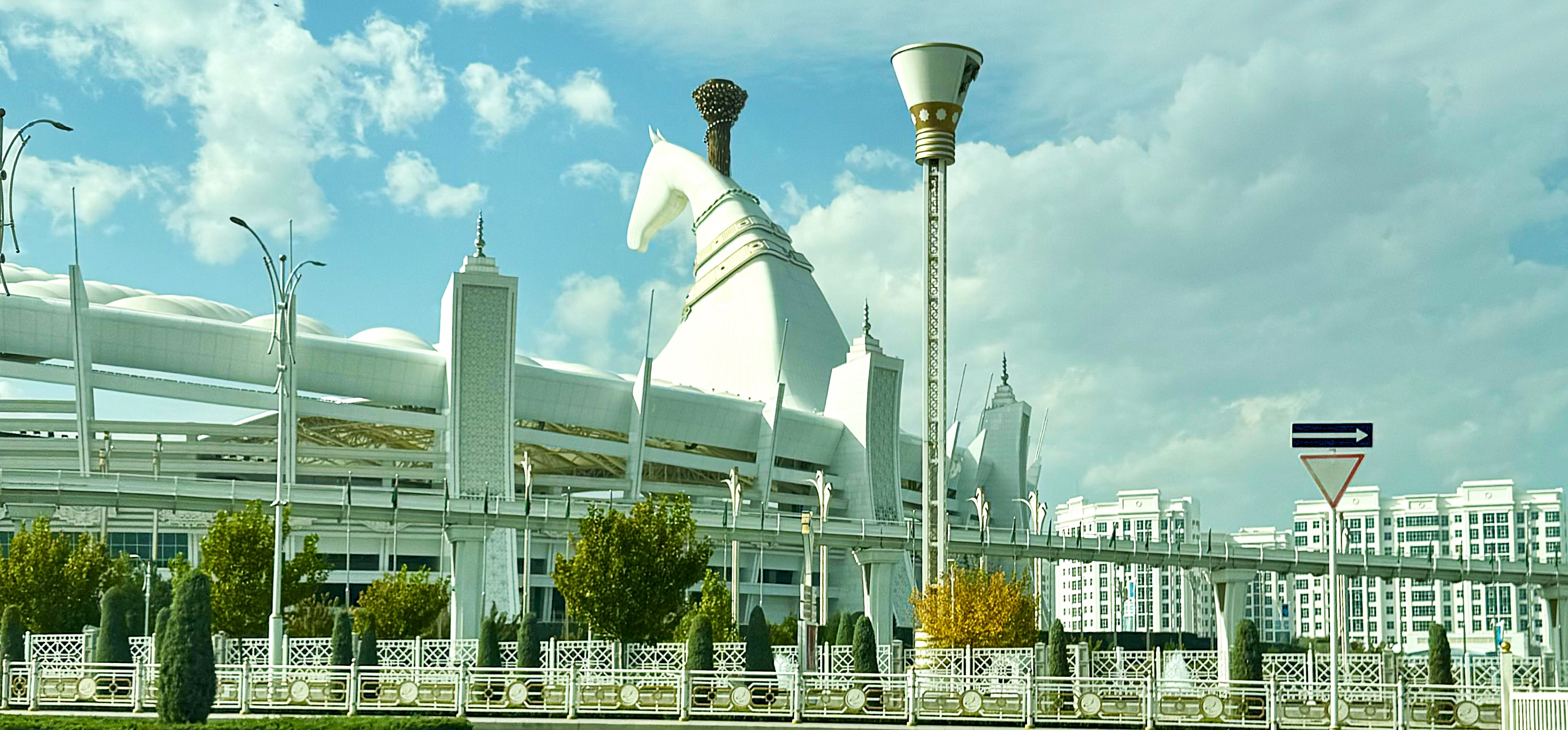
Stadium exterior

Stadium exterior at night

The stadium held 30,000 people and was built in 2003, named by Saparmurat Niyazov. In 2007, the Turkmen government decided to reconstruct the stadium and to enlarge it. The new arena seats up to 45,000 people. The stadium closed in 2012, and was partially demolished in 2013 for redevelopment.

=== Renovation for AIMAG 2017 ===
The construction of the stadium was completed in 2016, but it was officially opened in 2017. The stadium was designed by the British architectural firms AFL Architects and Arup, with construction carried out by the Turkish company Polimeks. The exterior of the stadium is designed in white tones, with its two-tiered stands are fully covered by a roof.

The most prominent feature of the renovation is head of an Ahal-Teke horse, which resembles the emblem of the country. The artistic depiction of an Akhal-Teke horse adorning the grandstand of the Olympic Stadium, recognized as the largest horse symbol in the world and listed in the Guinness World Records, measures 40.05 meters (131 ft 4.9 in) in height, 37.69 meters (123 ft 7.9 in) in length, and 40.24 meters (132 ft 0.6 in) at its widest point. Weighing 600 tonnes, the statue commemorates Turkmenistan's rich equestrian history

== Events ==
The stadium is mostly used by the Turkmen national football team, but also for musical performances by pop stars such as Maral Ibragimova. It was used for matches of the Turkmenistan national football team 2006 and 2010 FIFA World Cup qualification. The stadium hosted home matches for HTTU and Nebitçi FT during the group stage of the 2007 AFC Cup. The reconstructed stadium was the site of the 5th Asian Indoor and Martial Arts Games. The opening and closing ceremonies were held on 17 and 27 September. The wider Ashgabat Olympic Park also hosted the 2018 World Weightlifting Championships.

On February 11, 2026, the stadium hosted the 2025–26 AFC Champions League Two knockout stage football match between FC Arkadag and Al-Nasr from Saudi Arabia. Before the start of the match, a concert of Turkmen artists took place.

== Interesting facts ==
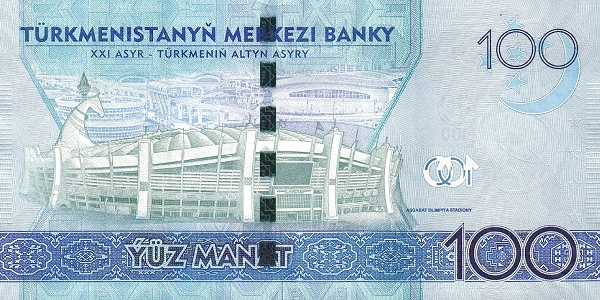
Back of a Turkmenistani banknote of 100 manat, 2017

The Ashgabat Olympic Stadium is honored by being featured on the 100 Turkmen manat banknote. In 2017, a set of two commemorative 100 manat coins was issued to honor the 5th Asian Indoor and Martial Arts Games. A golden and a silver coin both depicted the Ashgabat Olympic Stadium.

During the non-playing season, the stadium's grass field is covered with a special polyethylene covering, which allows it to be maintained in proper condition. Attendance: 45,000.

== Notable matches ==
Date	Team #1	Score	Team #2
11 February 2026 (ACL 2)	(Turkmenistan) FK Arkadag	0–1	(Saudi Arabia) Al-Nassr FC

== See also ==
- List of football stadiums in Turkmenistan
- Ashgabat Stadium
- Köpetdag Stadium
