= Baýram Durdyýew =

Turkmenistan footballer and manager

Personal information
- Date of birth: 17 March 1960 (age 66)
- Place of birth: Aşgabat, USSR
- Position: Defender

Senior career*
Years	Team	Apps	(Gls)
1973–1985	Stroitel/Kolhozçi Aşgabat		

Managerial career
- 1988–1989: Köpetdag Aşgabat (assistant)
- 1990–1996: Köpetdag Aşgabat
- 1992–1996: Turkmenistan
- 1997: FC Spartak Semey
- 2002: Turkmenistan (assistant)
- 2002: Köpetdag Aşgabat
- 2004–2005: Sanat Naft Abadan F.C.
- 2007–2010: FC Talyp Sporty
- 2012: FC Ahal
- 2013: Altyn Asyr FK
- 2014: FC Talyp Sporty
- 2019: Turkmenistan U-23
- * Club domestic league appearances and goals

Baýram Durdyýew (Russian: Байрам Овезович Дурдыев; born 1955 in Aşgabat, USSR) is a Turkmen professional football player and manager.

== Career ==
In 1973, he began his professional career for the Stroitel Aşgabat, in which he played until 1985, when he had finished it.

In 1988, he started his coaching career in Köpetdag, Aşgabat as the head coach's assistant. Since 1990, he led the Köpetdag Aşgabat. In 1992, he also coached the Turkmenistan national football team right until 1996. Later, he coached FC Spartak Semey, Sanat Naft Abadan F.C., FC Ahal and Altyn Asyr FK.
