= Turkmenistan First League =

- Country: Turkmenistan
- Confederation: AFC
- Level on pyramid: 2
- Promotion to: Ýokary Liga
- Domestic cup: Turkmenistan Cup
- Broadcaster(s): Turkmenistan Sport
- Website: tff.com
- Current: 2025 Birinji Liga

Turkmenistan First League, also known as Birinji Liga, (Turkmen: Türkmenistan Birinji Ligasy) is the second highest football league in Turkmenistan. The division is run by Football Association of Turkmenistan. It is split in 4 provincial zones.

== Format ==
There are four provincial zones:

- Mary zone
- Ahal zone
- Lebap zone
- Central zone (Ashgabat)

Each zone contains 4 to 6 teams. Every team plays against each other in their respective zones and top 2 teams from each zone qualifies for final round. The winners of final round gets promoted to Yokary Liga.
