= Garaşsyzlyk Stadium =

Sports venue in Daşoguz, Turkmenistan

- Interactive map of Garaşsyzlyk Stadium
- Location: Dashoguz, Turkmenistan
- Coordinates: 41°50′25″N 59°58′18″E
- Owner: Dashoguz Government
- Capacity: 10, 000

Construction
- Renovated: 2013

Garaşsyzlyk Stadium is a multi-purpose stadium in Daşoguz, Turkmenistan. It is currently used mostly for football matches. The stadium holds 10,000 people.

== History ==
In February 2011 the Russian company Rus Kurort Stroy started reconstruction of the stadium. This was a large-scale project started from scratch. In June 2013 the opening ceremony took place after a complete renovation of stadium. The stadium is covered with new grass, equipped with treadmills and placarded. The rooms are equipped with administrative offices, locker rooms and showers, a dining room, a hall for press conferences and a medical centre. There are also two indoor sports hall for 250 spectators, a gym and fitness rooms, rooms for coaches and referees, a sports shop, volleyball courts, basketball courts and tennis courts.

== See also ==
Other stadiums in Dashoguz:

- Sport toplumy (Daşoguz)
