= FC Altyn Asyr =

Association football club in Turkmenistan

Altyn Asyr
- Full name: Altyn Asyr futbol kluby
- Nickname: The Signalmen
- Founded: 2008; 18 years ago
- Ground: Büzmeýin Sport Toplumy
- Capacity: 10,000
- Chairman: Gurbanmyrat Hojageldiýew
- Manager: Ýazguly Hojageldyýew
- League: Ýokary Liga
- 2025: Ýokary Liga, 3rd of 8
- Website: altynasyrfk.com
Home colours	Away colours

Football Club Altyn Asyr (Turkmen: Altyn Asyr futbol kluby), also known as Altyn Asyr Ashgabat or simply Altyn Asyr, which translates to Golden Century, is a Turkmen professional football club based in Ashgabat. Founded in 2008, the club competes in the Ýokary Liga, the top tier of Turkmen football. It has remained there ever since, winning the Turkmenistan Higher League championship eight times in a row (2014, 2015, 2016, 2017, 2018, 2019, 2020 and 2021). The club also won the Turkmenistan Cup for 5 times in 2009, 2015, 2016, 2019 and 2020 and has been regular in AFC Cup recently. The team plays in the Ashgabat Stadium.

== History ==
From the first days of participation in official competitions team was headed by Umarguly Nurmamedov. From 2008 until mid-2012, team was led by Ali Gurbani, and from mid-2012 coach was Bayram Durdyýew. Since mid-2013 the head of the club became Gurbanmurat Hojageldiev. Since the beginning of 2014, the team was led by Ýazguly Hojageldyýew, helped by famous Turkmen footballers Goçguly Goçgulyýew and Gurbangeldi Durdyýew. At the end of the 2014 Ýokary Liga, for the first time they became the champions of Turkmenistan.

In the 2015 season, Altyn Asyr debuted in AFC Cup with loss to Al-Saqr (0:1) in Ashgabat Stadium. Team won the Turkmenistan Super Cup 2015, and defended the championship in 6 rounds before the end of 2015 Ýokary Liga. In December, the team defeated Şagadam FK and won the 2015 Turkmenistan Cup.

In 2018, Altyn Asyr reached the AFC Cup Final, where they lost in the decisive match to Air Force Club from Iraq. Altyn Asyr were the first team from Turkmenistan to reach the AFC Cup final. If they were to win the final, they would become the second team from Central Asia to win the AFC Cup, after Nasaf from Uzbekistan in 2011.

In June 2019, Altyn Asyr, tied the final round of the group stage with FC Istiklol - 1:1, and for the second year in a row went to the Inter-zone play-off semi-finals of the 2019 AFC Cup as the winner of the Central Asian group D. In August 2019, Kenyan Peter Opiyo and Niger Uche Kalu signed a contract with FC Altyn Asyr. This is the first foreign footballer in the history of the club and the first legionnaire in the 2019 Ýokary Liga. However, they lost to Hanoi FC 4:5 on aggregate.

=== Domestic ===
Season	League									Turkmenistan Cup	Top goalscorer		Manager
Season	Div.	Pos.	Pl.	W	D	L	GS	GA	P	Turkmenistan Cup	Name	League	Manager
2008	1st	8	20	7	2	11	21	20	23				(Turkmenistan) Ali Gurbani
2009	1st	5	16	6	2	8	20	23	20	Winners	(Turkmenistan) Didargylyç Urazow	10	(Turkmenistan) Ali Gurbani
2010	1st	2	18	10	5	3	34	20	35	Runners-up	(Turkmenistan) Amir Gurbani (Turkmenistan) Gahrymanberdi Çoňkaýew	10	(Turkmenistan) Ali Gurbani
2011	1st	6	36	12	9	15	46	42	44	Quarter-final			(Turkmenistan) Ali Gurbani
2012	1st	6	32	13	7	12	46	39	46	Quarter-final			(Turkmenistan) Ali Gurbani (Turkmenistan) Baýram Durdyýew
2013	1st	3	36	20	5	11	73	37	65	Runners-up			(Turkmenistan) Baýram Durdyýew
2014	1st	1	36	29	5	2	91	25	92	Quarter-final	(Turkmenistan) Didar Durdyýew	26	(Turkmenistan) Ýazguly Hojageldyýew
2015	1st	1	36	29	5	2	81	21	92	Winners	(Turkmenistan) Süleýman Muhadow	29	(Turkmenistan) Ýazguly Hojageldyýew
2016	1st	1	36	30	5	1	108	19	95	Winners	(Turkmenistan) Süleýman Muhadow	30	(Turkmenistan) Ýazguly Hojageldyýew
2017	1st	1	32	25	4	3	83	24	79	Semi-Final			(Turkmenistan) Ýazguly Hojageldyýew
2018	1st	1	28	21	3	4	65	16	66	Semi-Final			(Turkmenistan) Ýazguly Hojageldyýew
2019	1st	1	28	19	6	3	67	25	63	Winners	(Turkmenistan) Altymyrat Annadurdyýew	12	(Turkmenistan) Ýazguly Hojageldyýew
2020	1st	1	28	23	4	1	79	17	73	Winners	(Turkmenistan) Altymyrat Annadurdyýew	35	
2021	1st	1											

=== Continental ===
As of match played 14 August 2024

Competition	Pld	W	D	L	GF	GA	GD
AFC Cup/AFC Champions League Two	42	18	15	11	59	41	+18
Total	42	18	15	11	65	51	+14

Season	Competition	Round	Club	Home	Away	Aggregate
2015	AFC Cup	Preliminary round	(Palestine) Shabab Al-Dhahiriya	0–1	–	0–1
2016	AFC Cup	Group A	(Jordan) Al-Wehdat	0–0	1–1	4th
2016	AFC Cup	Group A	(Lebanon) Al Ahed	2–0	0–3	4th
2016	AFC Cup	Group A	(Bahrain) Hidd	1–2	1–1	4th
2017	AFC Cup	Group D	(Tajikistan) Istiklol	1–1	0–1	2nd
2017	AFC Cup	Group D	(Kyrgyzstan) Alay	4–1	2–1	2nd
2017	AFC Cup	Group D	(Kyrgyzstan) Dordoi Bishkek	3–0	2–0	2nd
2018	AFC Cup	Group D	(Tajikistan) Istiklol	2–2	3–2	1st
2018	AFC Cup	Group D	(Kyrgyzstan) Alay Osh	5–0	6–3	1st
2018	AFC Cup	Group D	(Turkmenistan) Ahal	1–0	0–0	1st
2018	AFC Cup	Inter-zone play-off semi-final	(India) Bengaluru	2–0	3–2	5–2
2018	AFC Cup	Inter-zone play-off final	(North Korea) April 25	1–1	2–2	3–3
2018	AFC Cup	Final	(Iraq) Al-Quwa Al-Jawiya	–	0–2	0–2
2019	AFC Cup	Group D	(Tajikistan) Istiklol	1–1	1–1	1st
2019	AFC Cup	Group D	(Kyrgyzstan) Dordoi	3–1	1–1	1st
2019	AFC Cup	Group D	(Tajikistan) Khujand	1–0	0–0	1st
2019	AFC Cup	Inter-zone play-off semi-final	(Vietnam) Hanoi FC	2–2	2–3	4-5
2020	AFC Cup	Group D	(Kyrgyzstan) Dordoi Bishkek	—N/a	—N/a	-
2020	AFC Cup	Group D	(Tajikistan) Khujand	—N/a	—N/a	-
2020	AFC Cup	Group D	(Tajikistan) Istiklol	—N/a	—N/a	-
2022	AFC Cup	Group E	(Kyrgyzstan) Neftchi Kochkor-Ata	1–0		2nd
2022	AFC Cup	Group E	(Tajikistan) CSKA Pamir Dushanbe	1–1		2nd
2022	AFC Cup	Group E	(Uzbekistan) Sogdiana Jizzakh	1–3		2nd
2023–24	AFC Cup	Group E	(Kyrgyzstan) FC Abdysh-Ata Kant	2–4	0–3	2nd
2023–24	AFC Cup	Group E	(Tajikistan) Ravshan Kulob	1-1	0–1	2nd
2023–24	AFC Cup	Group E	(Turkmenistan) Merw Mary	1–0	2–1	2nd
2024–25	AFC Champions League Two	Preliminary round	(India) East Bengal	3–2		3–2

== Club officials ==
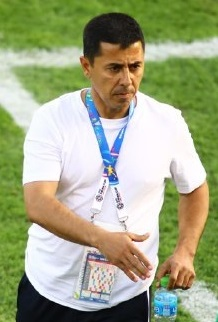
Ýazguly Hojageldyýew, manager of Altyn Asyr

=== Management ===
- Gurbanmyrat Hojageldyýew: Club director
- Annamuhammet Yarow: Manager

=== Technical staff ===
- Ýazguly Hojageldyýew: Head Coach
- Ýakup Ekezow and Begench Garaýew: Assistant coach
- Gurbangeldi Durdyýew and Hojaahmet Arazow: Fitness coach
- Dovlet Gylýjov: Doctor

== Managerial history ==
Name	Nationality	Years
Ali Gurbani	(Turkmenistan)	2008–2012
Baýram Durdyýew	(Turkmenistan)	2012–2013
Ýazguly Hojageldyýew	(Turkmenistan)	2014–

== Stadium ==
Until 2021, Altyn Asyr had never had its own stadium, with the team historically playing in various Ashgabat. The main home ground for AFC Cup games was Kopetdag Stadium, which has a capacity of 26,000. The stadium is situated in Ashgabat.

The team played Ýokary Liga home games at various Ashgabat stadiums: Kopetdag Stadium, Nusaý Stadium and Ashgabat Stadium.

Starting in autumn 2021, Altyn Asyr began to receive teams at the Büzmeýin Sport Topulmy (10,000 capacity).

== Kit suppliers and shirt sponsors ==
The team is owned by the Türkmenaragatnaşyk Agency of the Ministry of Industry and Communication of Turkmenistan.

Period	Kit supplier	Shirt sponsor
2014–2016	Adidas	Turkmentelecom
2017–present	Puma	Turkmentelecom

== Honours ==
=== Continental ===
- AFC Cup
  - Runners-up (1): 2018

=== Domestic ===
- Ýokary Liga
  - Champions (8) (record): 2014, 2015, 2016, 2017, 2018, 2019, 2020, 2021
- Turkmenistan Cup
  - Winners (5): 2009, 2015, 2016, 2019, 2020
- Turkmenistan Super Cup
  - Winners (8) (record): 2015, 2016, 2017, 2018, 2019, 2020, 2021, 2022
- Turkmenistan President's Cup
  - Winners (2): 2010, 2011
