= Nusaý Stadium =

Football stadium in Turkmenistan

Coordinates: 37°56′44.9″N 58°20′36.09″E

- Nisa Stadium
- Interactive map of Nusaý Stadium
- Location: Ashgabat, Turkmenistan
- Owner: Ashgabat Khyakimlik
- Capacity: 2,070
- Surface: Grass
- Scoreboard: Yes
- Record attendance: 3,000 (Turkmenistan vs China PR, 4 May 1997, WCQ 1998)

Tenants
- FC Ashgabat; FK Arkadag; Turkmenistan national football team (selected matches)

Nusaý Stadium (Turkmen: Nusaý stadiony; formerly Nisa-Chandybil Stadium) is a stadium in Ashgabat, Turkmenistan. It is currently used mostly for football matches and serves as the home for FC Aşgabat and training of the Turkmenistan national football team. It has a capacity of 3,000.

== Notable events ==
The stadium was used by the Turkmenistan national football team for 1998 FIFA World Cup qualification rounds for the Asian zone matches against China, Vietnam and Tajikistan in May 1997. The match against China and Tajikistan was attended by 3,000 people, and against Vietnam by 2,500 people.

The stadium hosted the 2007 AFC Cup group stage match of Nebitçi FT and Al Faisaly SC. It hosted 2022 Turkmenistan Cup Final between FC Ahal and Şagadam FK. and 2022 Turkmenistan Super Cup between FC Altyn Asyr and Şagadam FK.

== See also ==
- List of football stadiums in Turkmenistan
- Football in Turkmenistan
- Arkadag Stadium
