= Ýazguly Hojageldyýew =

Turkmen footballer, coach, and manager

Ýazguly Hojageldiýew
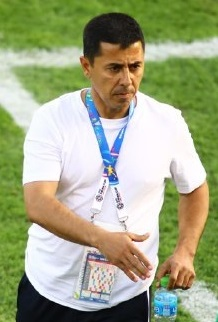

Personal information
- Full name: Ýazguly Berdimuhammedowiç Hojageldyýew
- Date of birth: 27 February 1977 (age 49)
- Place of birth: Büzmeýin, Turkmen SSR, Soviet Union
- Position: Midfielder

Team information
- Current team: Altyn Asyr (manager)

Senior career*
Years	Team	Apps	(Gls)
1998–1999	Nebitçi	?	(?)
2002	Kopet Dag	?	(?)
2002	Garagum	?	(?)
2003–2005	Nebitçi	?	(?)
2005–2007	Ýedigen	?	(22)
Total		?	(?)

Managerial career
- 1998–1999: Nebitçi
- 2002: Köpetdag
- 2002: Bagtyyarlyk
- 2003–2005: Nebitçi
- 2005–2013: Ýedigen
- 2010–2013: Turkmenistan
- 2014–: Altyn Asyr
- 2017–2019: Turkmenistan
- 2021: Turkmenistan
- 2022: Turkmenistan
Medal record
Men's football
Representing Turkmenistan (as manager)
AFC Challenge Cup
Runner-up	2010
Runner-up	2012
- * Club domestic league appearances and goals

Ýazguly Berdimuhammedowiç Hojageldiýew (Russian: Язгулы Бердымухаммедович Ходжагельдыев; born 16 February 1977) is a Turkmen professional football coach and former player who is the current manager of Altyn Asyr.

== Career ==
Hojageldyýew was born in Büzmeýin, the same city he started playing football in his childhood. The first trainer was the honored coach of Turkmenistan Rejep Nurberdiyev.

As a football player, he played as a midfielder for the Turkmen clubs FC Büzmeýin, FC Dagdan Aşgabat, FC Nebitçi, FC Garagum, Kopetdag and HTTU Aşgabat.

== Coaching career ==
=== Turkmenistan national team ===
In February 2010, led the Turkmenistan national football team. Under his leadership the team went to Sri Lanka to participate in the final tournament of the AFC Challenge Cup 2010. In a tournament team of Turkmenistan for the first time made it to the final of the AFC Challenge Cup, losing in the final match of the DPRK team in the penalty shootout.

In March 2011, the national team of Turkmenistan has successfully entered the final round of the AFC Challenge Cup 2012, beating Pakistan, Taiwan, and played in a draw with India in the qualifying competition in Kuala Lumpur.

In the summer of 2011 the first qualifying match against Indonesia in the race for getting into the final of the 2014 World Cup team beginning in Ashgabat draw (1:1), and the humiliating defeat in the party with a 4–3 team knocked out of the fight for the right to go to the World Cup 2014.

In winter 2012 team gathered for a training camp in Turkey. In preparation for the AFC Challenge Cup 2012 team Ýazguly Hojageldyýew had a friendly match with Romania, as a result of devastating Turkmenistan team lost 4–0.

In March 2012, the team went to Kathmandu to participate in the final tournament of the AFC Challenge Cup 2012. Turkmenistan national team beat the tournament hosts Nepal (0–3) and the team of the Maldives (3–1), the match with Palestine ended in a goalless draw. In the semifinals, Turkmen defeated the Philippines (2–1). Turkmenistan national team for the second time missed AFC Challenge Cup, losing to North Korea at the end of the match (1–2).

In 2017, again headed the national team of Turkmenistan.

=== Managerial ===
As of match played 18 October 2026

Team	From	To	Record							
Team	From	To	G	W	D	L	F	A	GD	Win %
Nebitçi	1998	1999	36	20	5	11	74	56	+18	55.56
FK Köpetdag Aşgabat	2002	2002	16	8	3	5	23	17	+6	50
FC Bagtyyarlyk-Lebap	2002	2002	25	14	7	4	33	17	+16	56
Nebitçi	2003	2005	80	56	14	10	201	51	+146	70
Ýedigen	2005	2013	322	189	79	52	673	273	+400	58.7
Turkmenistan	1 January 2010	28 March 2013	19	10	5	4	36	19	+15	52.63
Altyn Asyr	1 January 2014	Present	475	327	75	73	1,075	433	+642	68.84
Turkmenistan	1 February 2017	25 November 2019	18	7	3	8	24	28	-4	38.89
Turkmenistan	1 June 2021	16 June 2022	6	2	0	4	6	13	-7	33.33
Total			995	633	191	171	2,145	906	+1234	63.62

== Honours ==
=== As a Coach ===
Turkmenistan

- AFC Challenge Cup:

Runners-up: 2010, 2012

HTTU
Champion of Turkmenistan: 2006, 2009, 2013
Silver medalist in Turkmenistan: 2007, 2008, 2011
Bronze medalist in Turkmenistan: 2012
Winner of the Cup of Turkmenistan: 2006, 2011
Turkmenistan Cup finalist: 2008
Turkmenistan Super Cup: 2009
Turkmenistan President Cup: 2007, 2008, 2009
Semifinalist of the Commonwealth of Independent States Cup: 2010

Altyn Asyr FK
Champion of Turkmenistan: 2014, 2015, 2016, 2017, 2018, 2019, 2020, 2021
Winner of the Cup of Turkmenistan: 2015, 2016, 2019, 2020
Turkmenistan Super Cup: 2015, 2016, 2017, 2018, 2019, 2020, 2021, 2022

- Finalist 2018 AFC Cup

Individual

- Ýokary Liga Coach of the Season: 2020, 2021
