= Sport toplumy (Abadan) =

Coordinates: 38°02′46″N 58°11′48″E

Buzmeyin Sport Complex
- Interactive map of Buzmeyin Sport Complex
- Full name: Aşgabat şäheriniň Büzmeýin etrabyndaky Sport toplumy
- Former names: Abadan Sport Toplumy
- Location: Büzmeýin District, Ashgabat, Turkmenistan
- Owner: Abadan District Administration
- Capacity: 10,000
- Surface: Grass

Construction
- Groundbreaking: June 2009; 17 years ago
- Built: 2009
- Opened: 2009
- Cost: 20 million USD
- General contractor: ALP-SAN Inşaat

Tenant
- Altyn Asyr FK (2021–present)

Buzmeyin Sport Complex (Turkmen: Büzmeýin Sport Toplumy) is a stadium in Büzmeýin District, Ashgabat, Turkmenistan. It is currently used mostly for football matches. It has a capacity of 10,000 people. It is the home of Ýokary Liga club Altyn Asyr FK.

It was called Abadan Sport Complex until 2018.

== History ==
The sports complex opened in June 2009 in Abadan city. Construction work was carried out by the Turkish company ALP-SAN Inşaat. The project cost $20 million. It hosted some matches for the 2010 Turkmenistan President's Cup.

In 2018, the Abadan District was renamed to Büzmeýin District, and along with this, the name of the stadium was changed to Buzmeyin Sport Complex.

Since the fall of 2021, the stadium has become the home stadium for Altyn Asyr FK.

== Events ==
On 4 December 2014, the 2014 Turkmenistan Super Cup final was hosted in the stadium.

== Overview ==
The sports complex features a football field, gymnastics, boxing, wrestling, and fitness halls, a tennis court, mini-football, basketball, handball, and volleyball courts, as well as an indoor swimming pool. The stands are equipped with a canopy that protects spectators from the sun and weather conditions. The commentator’s booth and the control panel for managing all the facility’s services are equipped with modern technology.
