= Turkmenistan Cup =

- Organiser(s): Football Federation of Turkmenistan
- Founded: 1993; 33 years ago
- Region: Turkmenistan
- Teams: 8
- Qualifier for: AFC Challenge League
- Domestic cup: Turkmenistan Super Cup
- Current champions: FK Arkadag (3rd title)
- Most championships: Köpetdag Aşgabat (7 titles)
- Broadcaster: Turkmenistan Sport TV
- Website: tff.com
- 2025 Turkmenistan Cup

The Turkmenistan Cup (Turkmen: Türkmenistanyň Kubogy) is an annual knockout competition in men's domestic football in Turkmenistan. The Football Federation of Turkmenistan is the organising body of this competition, which has been run every year since its inception in 1993. The competition's most successful performer is Köpetdag Aşgabat with seven trophies.

The winner of the competition receives a spot in the Turkmenistan Super Cup against the Ýokary Liga champions of the season, and a place in the AFC Challenge League group stage (previously qualifying into the AFC Cup).

== Competition format ==
The competition is held under a knockout format between all members of the Ýokary Liga. Games are played over two legs, with the final tie being a single match. Traditionally, it had been held in Ashgabat.

== Winners ==
Previous winners are:

=== Soviet time ===
- 1936: Lokomotiw Aşgabat
- 1937: Gyzyl Goşun Öýi Aşgabat
- 1938: Lokomotiw Aşgabat
- 1939: Dinamo Aşgabat
- 1940: Dinamo Aşgabat
- 1941-43: no tournament
- 1944: Lokomotiw Aşgabat
- 1945: Dinamo Aşgabat
- 1946: Dinamo Aşgabat
- 1947: Dinamo Aşgabat
- 1948: no tournament
- 1949: Spartak Aşgabat
- 1950: no tournament
- 1951: Lokomotiw Mary
- 1952: DOSA Aşgabat
- 1953: DOSA Aşgabat
- 1954: Hasyl Aşgabat
- 1955: Dinamo Aşgabat
- 1956: Spartak Aşgabat
- 1957: Gyzyl Metallist Aşgabat
- 1958: Gyzyl Metallist Aşgabat
- 1959: DOSA Aşgabat
- 1960: Gämigurluşyk Zawody Çärjew
- 1961: Serhetçi Aşgabat
- 1962: Ýyldyz Gyzylarbat
- 1963: Serhetçi Aşgabat
- 1964: Ýyldyz Gyzylarbat
- 1965: Serhetçi Aşgabat
- 1966: Serhetçi Aşgabat
- 1967: Serhetçi Aşgabat
- 1968: Serhetçi Aşgabat
- 1969: Serhetçi Aşgabat
- 1970: Sementçi Büzmeýin
- 1971: Sementçi Büzmeýin
- 1972: Energogurluşykçy Mary
- 1973: Lokomotiw Çärjew
- 1974: Nebitçi Krasnowodsk
- 1975: Nebitçi Krasnowodsk
- 1976: Nebitçi Krasnowodsk
- 1977: Şatlyk Mary
- 1978: Şatlyk Mary
- 1979: Şatlyk Mary
- 1980: Nebitçi Krasnowodsk
- 1981-86: no tournament
- 1987: Rotor Aşgabat
- 1988: Şapak Aşgabat
- 1989: Nebitçi Krasnowodsk
- 1990: no tournament
- 1991: Obahojalyktehnika Aşgabat
- 1992: Köpetdag Aşgabat

=== Since independence ===
Season	Winners	Runners-up	Score in Final	Ref.	Venue, date
1993	Köpetdag Aşgabat	Merw Mary	4–0		
1994	Köpetdag Aşgabat	Turan Daşoguz	2–0		
1995	Turan Daşoguz	Köpetdag Aşgabat	4–3		
1996–97	Köpetdag Aşgabat	Nisa Aşgabat	2–0		
1998	Nisa Aşgabat	Nebitçi Balkanabat	3–0		
1999	Köpetdag Aşgabat	Nebitçi Balkanabat	3–1		
2000	Köpetdag Aşgabat	Nisa Aşgabat	5–0		
2001	Köpetdag Aşgabat	Nebitçi Balkanabat	2–0		
2002	Garagum Türkmenabat	Şagadam Türkmenbaşy	0–0 (a.e.t.), 4–2 (p)		
2003	Nebitçi Balkanabat	Nisa Aşgabat	2–1 (a.e.t.)		
2004	Nebitçi Balkanabat	Asudalyk Aşgabat	1–0		
2005	Merw Mary	Köpetdag Aşgabat	1–1 (a.e.t.), 3–1 (p)		
2006	HTTU Aşgabat	Köpetdag Aşgabat	0–0 (a.e.t.), 7–6 (p)		Şagadam Stadium
2007	Şagadam Türkmenbaşy	Merw Mary	1–0 (a.e.t.)		
2008	Merw Mary	HTTU Aşgabat	2–1		
2009	Altyn Asyr	Merw Mary	3–0		
2010	Balkan	Altyn Asyr	3–2		
2011	HTTU Aşgabat	Aşgabat	0–0 (a.e.t.), 4–2 (p)		
2012	Balkan	HTTU Aşgabat	2–1		
2013	Ahal	Altyn Asyr	2–1		
2014	Ahal	Balkan	3–2		
2015	Altyn Asyr	Şagadam Türkmenbaşy	0–0 (a.e.t.), 7–6 (p)		
2016	Altyn Asyr	Aşgabat	4–0		
2017	Ahal	Şagadam Türkmenbaşy	4–0		
2018	Köpetdag Aşgabat	Energetik Mary	0–0 (a.e.t.), 5–4 (p)		
2019	Altyn Asyr	Ahal	3–0		
2020	Altyn Asyr	Köpetdag Aşgabat	1–1 (a.e.t.), 3–0 (p)		9 December 2021, Ashgabat Stadium
2021	Şagadam	Ahal	1–0		22 December 2021, Şagadam Stadium
2022	Ahal	Şagadam	5–0		11 December 2022, Nusaý Stadium
2023	Arkadag	Ahal	3–0		24 December 2023, Arkadag Stadium
2024	Arkadag	Ahal	1–0		23 December 2024, Ashgabat Stadium
2025	Arkadag	Ahal	2–1		

== Top-performing clubs ==
Club	Wins	Runners-up	Winning years	Losing years
Köpetdag Aşgabat	7	4	1993, 1994, 1996/97, 1999, 2000, 2001, 2018	1995, 2005, 2006, 2020
Altyn Asyr	5	2	2009, 2015, 2016, 2019, 2020	2010, 2013
Nebitçi FT	4	4	2003, 2004, 2010, 2012	1998, 1999, 2001, 2014
Ahal	4	5	2013, 2014, 2017, 2022	2019, 2021, 2023, 2024, 2025
Arkadag	3	-	2023, 2024, 2025	
Şagadam Türkmenbaşy	2	4	2007, 2021	2002, 2015, 2017, 2022
Merw Mary	2	3	2005, 2008	1993, 2007, 2009
HTTU Aşgabat	2	2	2006, 2011	2008, 2012
Nisa Aşgabat	1	3	1998	1996/97, 2000, 2003
Turan Daşoguz	1	1	1995	1994
Garagum Türkmenabat	1	-	2002	
Aşgabat	-	2	-	2011, 2016
Asudalyk Aşgabat	-	1	-	2004
Energetik Mary	-	1	-	2018

== Venues ==
All two-legged games running up to the final are played on the home ground of both teams. The final match is played at a neutral venue.

In 2023, the final was held at a new Arkadag Stadium in the city of Arkadag.
