= Ýedigen FC =

Ýedigen
- Full name: Ýedigen Ashgabat Football Team
- Nickname: The Students
- Founded: 2003; 23 years ago
- Ground: HTTU Stadium
- Capacity: 1,000
- Owner: International Turkmen-Turkish University
- League: Yokary Liga
Home colours	Away colours	Third colours

Ýedigen Football Team (Turkmen: Ýedigen futbol topary) was a Turkmen professional football club based in Ashgabat. It was the football team of the International Turkmen-Turkish University. Their home stadium was the HTTU Stadium which can hold 1,000 people and is located on the university's grounds.

== History ==
The club was formed by the International Turkmen-Turkish University in 2003 under the name HTTU Aşgabat (Turkmen: Halkara Türkmen-Türk Uniwersiteti futbol topary Aşgabat).

In 2012, the team placed 3rd in the Ýokary Liga.

In 2013, HTTU won the Ýokary Liga, Turkmenistan Super Cup, and Eskişehir Cup. Süleýman Muhadow scored 23 goals during the season, placing second in the golden boot race.

The following year, in the wake of several important departures, including the club's captain, Rovshen Meredov was appointed manager. Under Meredov, HTTU reached the final of the Turkmenistan Super Cup, losing 4–2 to FC Ahal. As a result of its success in the 2013 season, HTTU earned a spot in the 2014 AFC President's Cup in the Philippines, eventually defeating North Korean side Rimyongsu 2–1 in the final. Suleyman Muhadov was named both tournament MVP and top scorer with 11 goals.

From 2016, the club changed its name to Ýedigen FC and was relegated from the Ýokary Liga.

=== Domestic ===
Season	League									Turkmenistan Cup	Top goalscorer		Manager
Season	Div.	Pos.	Pl.	W	D	L	GS	GA	P	Turkmenistan Cup	Name	League	Manager
2015	1st	6	36	12	10	14	50	54	46	Quarter-final			(Turkmenistan) Begench Garayev
2016	1st	9	36	6	4	26	22	31	22				(Turkmenistan) Begench Garayev

=== Continental ===
Competition	Pld	W	D	L	GF	GA	GD
AFC Cup	10	2	2	6	19	26	-7
AFC President's Cup	9	6	2	1	20	7	+13
Total	19	8	4	7	39	33	+6

Season	Competition	Round	Club	Home	Away	Aggregate
2006	AFC Cup	Group D	(Lebanon) Al-Nejmeh	2–2	2–6	3rd
2006	AFC Cup	Group D	(Jordan) Al-Faisaly	2–2	3–4	3rd
2007	AFC Cup	Group B	(Bahrain) Al-Muharraq	1–2	1–3	3rd
2007	AFC Cup	Group B	(Jordan) Al-Wehdat	1–2	2–4	3rd
2007	AFC Cup	Group B	(Yemen) Al-Hilal	3–1	2–0	3rd
2010	AFC President's Cup	Group C	(Bhutan) Druk Stars	8–0		
2010	AFC President's Cup	Group C	(Myanmar) Yadanarbon	0–0		
2010	AFC President's Cup	Semifinal	(Kyrgyzstan) Dordoi Bishkek	0–1		
2014	AFC President's Cup	Group B	(Taiwan) Tatung	2–0		
2014	AFC President's Cup	Group B	(North Korea) Rimyongsu	1–1		
2014	AFC President's Cup	Group B	(Philippines) United City	2–1		
2014	AFC President's Cup	Final Stage Group A	(Nepal) Manang Marshyangdi	3–1		
2014	AFC President's Cup	Final Stage Group A	Sri Lanka Air Force	2–1		
2014	AFC President's Cup	Final	(North Korea) Rimyongsu	2–1		

=== CIS Cup ===
Season	Competition	Round	Club	Score	Position
2006	Commonwealth of Independent States Cup	Group C	(Kyrgyzstan) Dordoi-Dynamo Naryn	2–0	3rd
2006	Commonwealth of Independent States Cup	Group C	(Moldova) Sheriff Tiraspol	1–0	3rd
2006	Commonwealth of Independent States Cup	Group C	(Ukraine) Shakhtar Donetsk	1–5	3rd
2007	Commonwealth of Independent States Cup	Group D	(Serbia) OFK Beograd	0–2	4th
2007	Commonwealth of Independent States Cup	Group D	(Georgia (country)) Sioni Bolnisi	1–2	4th
2007	Commonwealth of Independent States Cup	Group D	(Lithuania) FBK Kaunas	0–4	4th
2010	Commonwealth of Independent States Cup	Group C	(Estonia) Levadia Tallinn	3–1	2nd
2010	Commonwealth of Independent States Cup	Group C	Russia XI	2–4	2nd
2010	Commonwealth of Independent States Cup	Group C	(Ukraine) Dynamo Kyiv	2–4	2nd
2010	Commonwealth of Independent States Cup	Quarterfinal	(Uzbekistan) Bunyodkor	1–1 (p)	
2010	Commonwealth of Independent States Cup	Semifinal	(Russia) Rubin Kazan	0–4	

== Honours ==
- Turkmenistan League (4)
  - Winners: 2005, 2006, 2009, 2013
  - Runners-up: 2007, 2008, 2011
- Turkmenistan Cup (2)
  - Winners: 2006, 2011
  - Runners-up: 2008, 2012
- Turkmenistan Super Cup (3)
  - Winners: 2005, 2009, 2012
  - Runners-up: 2006, 2011
- Turkmenistan President's Cup (3)
  - Winner: 2007, 2008, 2009
  - Runners-up: 2006
- AFC President's Cup (1)
  - Winner: 2014

== Managers ==
- (Turkmenistan) Oraz Geldiýew (2003–2006)
- (Turkmenistan) Ýazguly Hojageldyýew (2006–2013)
- (Turkmenistan) Röwşen Meredow (2014)
- (Turkmenistan) Begench Garayev (2014–2016)
