= Şagadam FK =

Şagadam
- Full name: Türkmenbaşydaky Nebiti Gaýtadan Işleýän Zawodlar Toplumynyň Şagadam Futbol Kluby
- Nickname: Seaside
- Founded: 1949; 77 years ago
- Ground: Şagadam Stadium, Türkmenbaşy, Turkmenistan
- Capacity: 5,000
- Owner: The Turkmenbashi Complex of Oil Refineries
- Chairman: Seydullamyrat Annamyradov
- Manager: Rahmanguly Baýlýýew
- League: Ýokary Liga
- 2025: Ýokary Liga, 4th of 9
- Website: https://tngizt.gov.tm/social/shagadam
Home colours	Away colours

Football Club Şagadam (Turkmen: Şagadam Futbol Kluby) is a Turkmen professional football club based in Türkmenbaşy, Balkan Region. The team compete in Ýokary Liga, the top division in Turkmenistan football league system. The club was founded in 1949 and home matches are played at Şagadam Stadium, their original home ground.

== History ==
The football club was founded in 1949 by the Complex of Oil Refineries in Krasnovodsk (Turkmen SSR). Prior to 1991, they had the name of DOSA.

In 1992, until June, they were playing under the name Neftyanik and then – Hazar.

In August 1993 the club was renamed Şagadam.

At the end of 2002 Şagadam FK was confirmed as champions of 2002 Ýokary Liga for the first time in its history. The team was led to its success under the guidance of head coach Kudrat Ismailov.

In the 2012 season, Şagadam took fifth place and had the league's best scorer with their player Aleksandr Boliyan.

=== Domestic ===
Season	League									Turkmenistan Cup	Top goalscorer		Manager
Season	Div.	Pos.	Pl.	W	D	L	GS	GA	P	Turkmenistan Cup	Name	League	Manager
2015	1st	4	36	16	10	10	59	36	58	Runner-Up			(Turkmenistan) Amanmyrat Meredow
2016	1st	8	36	8	8	20	20	38	32				
2019	1st	3	28	15	7	6	25	42	42	Quarter-finals	Kerim Hojaberdiýew	7	(Turkmenistan) Aleksandr Klimenko
2020	1st	3	28	13	8	7	27	46	47	Semi-finals	Yhlas Magtymow	17	(Turkmenistan) Aleksandr Klimenko
2021	1st	3	14	6	3	5	23	20	21	Winners	Nazar Towakelow	6	(Turkmenistan) Rahmanguly Baýlyýew
2022	1st	5	28	10	4	14	45	44	34				
2023	1st	8	24	3	5	16	16	41	14				
2024	1st	4	30	13	1	16	40	51	40		Hydyrgeldi Atdžanow	11	(Turkmenistan) Ali Gurbani

== Team name history ==
- 1949-1974: DOSA Krasnovodsk
- 1974: Neftyanik Krasnovodsk
- 1992: Hazar Krasnovodsk
- 1993: Hazar Türkmenbaşy
- August 1993–present: FC Şagadam Türkmenbaşy

== Honours ==
- Turkmenistan League
  - Winners (1): 2002
- Turkmenistan Cup
  - Winners (2): 2007, 2021
  - Runners-up (3): 2002, 2015, 2017
- Turkmenistan Super Cup
  - Runner-up (3): 2007, 2016, 2022
- Turkmenistan Federation Cup
  - Winners (1): 2014

== Squad ==
Note: Flags indicate national team as defined under FIFA eligibility rules; some limited exceptions apply. Players may hold more than one non-FIFA nationality.

No.	Pos.	Nation	Player
1	GK	TKM	Sergeý Kuznesow
2	DF	TKM	Bagtyýar Gürgenow
3	DF	TKM	Ýunus Orazmämmedow
4	DF	TKM	Ionel Kosofana
5	DF	TKM	Möwlamberdi Goşşanow
6	MF	TKM	Baýramgeldi Nurlyýew
7	MF	TKM	Hydyr Ýakubow
8	DF	TKM	Bahtiýar Hojaahmedow
9	MF	TKM	Ýewgeniý Tkaçenko
10	FW	TKM	Murat Ýakşiýew
11	FW	TKM	Hemra Amanmämmedow
12	DF	TKM	Resul Mahmydow

No.	Pos.	Nation	Player
13	FW	TKM	Roman Abdurzaýew
14	DF	TKM	Farhad Italmazow
15	DF	TKM	Saýat Gulyýew
17	MF	TKM	Roman Galkin
18	MF	TKM	Baýramsähet Sapargylyjow
19	MF	TKM	Ruslan Täjiýew
20	MF	TKM	Yhlas Magtymow
21	MF	TKM	Guwançgeldi Ýagmyrow
22	MF	TKM	Mekan Aşyrow
23	DF	TKM	Aşyrgeldi Saryýew
24	DF	TKM	Begenç Gylyçnyýazow
25	GK	TKM	Döwlet Nazarow

== Club officials ==
=== Management ===
Position	Name & Surname
Chairman	(Turkmenistan) Seýdullamyrat Annamyradow
Accountant	(Turkmenistan) Mähri Haýydowa

=== Current technical staff ===
Position	Name & Surname
First Team Manager	(Turkmenistan) Rahmanguly Baýlýýew
Goalkeeping coach	(Turkmenistan) Nikita Gorbunow
Coach	(Turkmenistan) Ýagmyrmyrat Annamyradow
Coach	(Turkmenistan) Kiçigul Kiçigulow
Coach	(Turkmenistan) Anatoliý Zawýalow
Coach	(Turkmenistan) Witaliý Anisiçkin
Video Operator	(Turkmenistan) Baýramgeldi Aşyrow
Administrator	(Turkmenistan) Aleksandr Markosow
Doctor	(Turkmenistan) Ezizmämmet Täçmämmedow
Masseur	(Turkmenistan) Toýguly Täçmämmedow

== Managers ==
- (Turkmenistan) Kudrat Ismailov (2001–03)
- (Turkmenistan) Armen Soghomonyan (2005)
- (Turkmenistan) Kudrat Ismailov (Oct 2005 – Dec 05)
- (Turkmenistan) Kurban Meredov (2006–08)
- (Turkmenistan) Kudrat Ismailov (2008–11)
- (Turkmenistan) Rejepmyrat Agabaýew (2011–13)
- (Turkmenistan) Amanmyrat Meredow (2013–16)
- (Turkmenistan) Aleksandr Klimenko (2017–August 2021)
- (Turkmenistan) Rahmanguly Baýlýýew (August 2021–)
