= Köpetdag Stadium =

Multi-purpose stadium in Turkmenistan

Coordinates: 37°56′58″N 58°22′12″E

Köpetdag Stadiony
- Interactive map of Köpetdag Stadiony
- Location: Kemine Street, 64, Ashgabat, Turkmenistan
- Owner: Ministry of Internal Affairs
- Capacity: 26,503
- Surface: Grass
- Record attendance: 26,500 (Turkmenistan vs Korea DPR, 14 November 2019)

Construction
- Groundbreaking: 1995–1997
- Opened: 1997
- Renovated: 2015

Tenants
- FC Köpetdag; Turkmenistan national football team

Kopetdag Stadium (Russian: Köpetdag Sport Toplumy) is a multi-purpose stadium in Ashgabat, Turkmenistan. It is currently used mostly for football matches and serves as the home for Köpetdag Aşgabat, that currently plays in the Ýokary Liga. The stadium holds 26,503 people and was built in 1997. The total area of the facility exceeds 11 hectares.

== History ==
The stadium was built in 1997 by international technical company Mensel JV. Since opening, it has served as the home arena of Köpetdag Aşgabat. In 2015, the stadium underwent radical reconstruction and reopened for the cup match played between Köpetdag and FC Merw. In the fall of 2015, the stadium hosted three matches of the national team during the 2018 World Cup qualifying campaign, all of which ended in victories for the hosts. The stadium features a natural grass football field. Surrounding it are synthetic running tracks, sectors for long and high jump, outdoor courts and a training field.

== See also ==
- List of football stadiums in Turkmenistan
- Ashgabat Olympic Stadium
- Ashgabat Stadium
