= Ashgabat Stadium =

Stadium in Ashgabat, Turkmenistan

Coordinates: 37°55′41″N 58°21′01″E

Aşgabat Stadiony
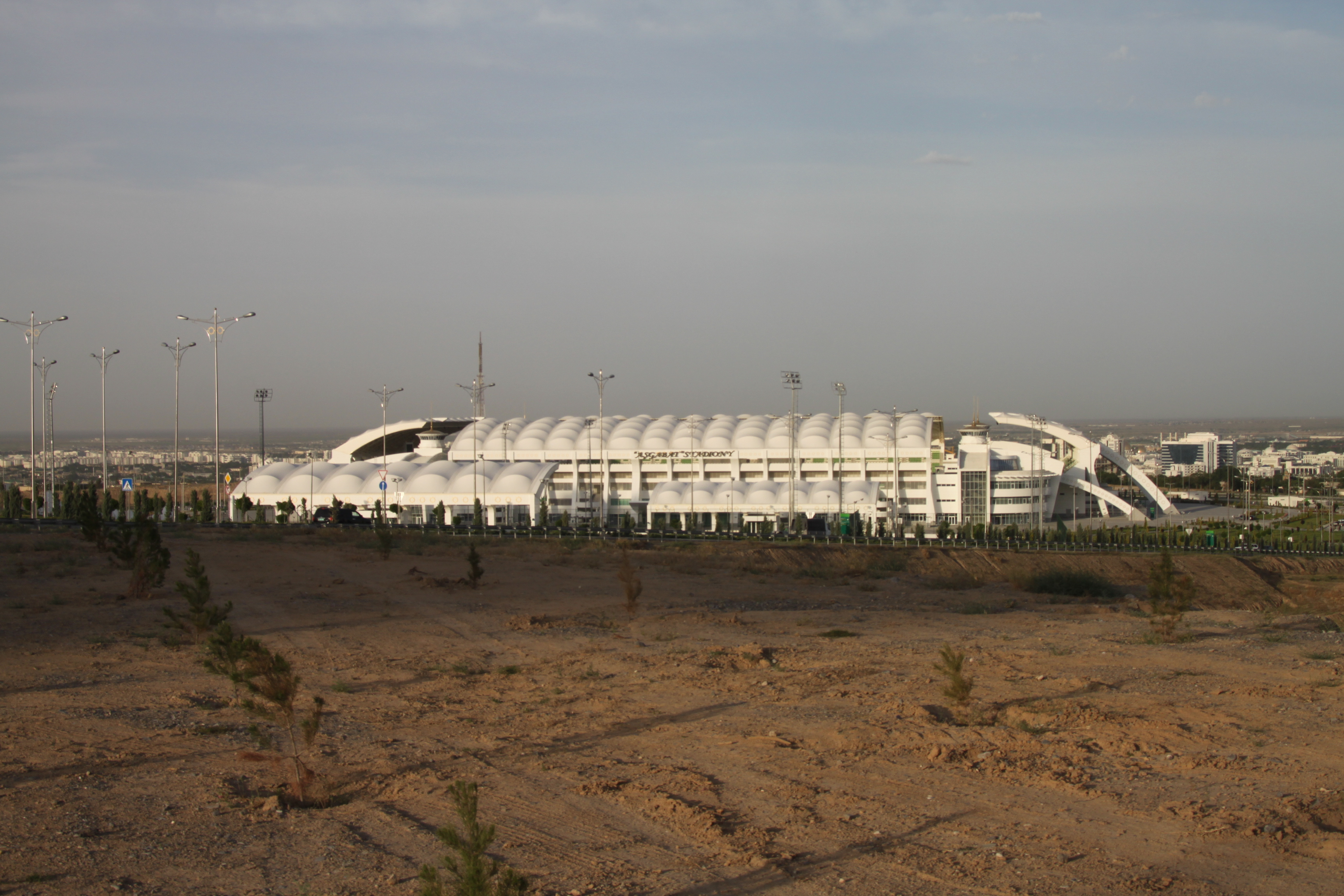
- Interactive map of Aşgabat Stadiony
- Full name: Türkmenistanyň Bedenterbiýe we sport baradaky döwlet komitetiniň "Aşgabat" köpugurly stadiony
- Address: Bagtyýarlyk 9 Ashgabat; 744000
- Location: Ashgabat, Turkmenistan
- Owner: Government of Turkmenistan
- Capacity: 20,000
- Surface: Artificial turf
- Record attendance: 20,000 (Ahal vs Al-Qadsia, 29 April 2015)

Construction
- Groundbreaking: 2009–2011
- Opened: October 2011
- Architect: Polimeks

Tenants
- FC Aşgabat; Ahal FK; Turkmenistan national football team

Website
- aks.gov.tm

The Ashgabat Stadium (Turkmen: Aşgabat Stadiony) is a multi-purpose stadium in Ashgabat, Turkmenistan. It is currently used mostly for celebrations and football matches. The stadium holds 20,000 people and was built in 2011.

== History ==
In 2009, on behalf of President of Turkmenistan Gurbanguly Berdimuhamedow, funding was allocated for construction of a multipurpose stadium with 20,000 seats. The construction was led by Turkish company Polimeks. Opening of the stadium was held on 28 October 2011. The opening ceremony was devoted to the Independence Day of Turkmenistan.

== Overview ==
Sports complex houses a football field, running track, sectors for the long jump, as well as a platform for gymnastic competitions. The building of the stadium has 17 practice rooms for various sports, including tennis, volleyball, basketball, badminton and bowling halls, table tennis, weightlifting, boxing, wrestling and karting.

The facility features a swimming pool, for adults with a volume of 450 m³, a depth of 2.20 metres, a length of 25 metres and a width of 13 metres, as well as a children's swimming pool with a volume of 390 m³, a depth of 1 metre, a length of 16 metres and a width of 13 metres.

== Notable events ==
Ashgabat Stadium hosted the 2021 and the 2024 Turkmenistan Football Cup finals.

On 16 November 2023, the stadium hosted the Turkmenistan national football team for the first time for a 2026 World Cup Qualification match against Uzbekistan, which ended in a 3–1 win for Uzbekistan, attendance 19500 peoples.

== Parking ==
An open and covered parking facility with a capacity of 1,252 vehicles.

== See also ==
- Ashgabat Olympic Stadium
