= 2010 Turkmenistan Cup =

Football competition

The 2010 Turkmenistan Cup is 18th since independence of the Turkmen national football cup.

== First round ==
The first round involved 16 teams one of which withdrew.

Team 1	Agg.	Team 2	1st leg	2nd leg
Şagadam Türkmenbaşy	6-0 (b)	FC Melik	3-0	3-0
FC Altyn Asyr	1-1 (a)	HTTU Aşgabat	0-0	1-1
Talyp Sporty Aşgabat	2-1	FC Aşgabat	0-0	2-1
FC Ahal	5-2	FC Bagyr	3-0	2-2
FC Balkan	8-0	FC Balkan-2	6-0	2-0
FC Daşoguz	13-5	FC Gaýrat	5-3	8-2
FC Lebap	7-1	FC Bezirgen	4-1	3-0
Merw Mary	9-1	FC Gökje	2-0	7-1

Notes

- ^1 FC Melik pulled out of the competition.

== Quarterfinals ==
The quarterfinal matches will be played on June 19 (first legs) and June 26, 2010 (second legs).

Team 1	Agg.	Team 2	1st leg	2nd leg
FC Balkan	3-0	FC Daşoguz	2-0	1-0
Merw Mary	3-1	FC Lebap	1-0	2-1
FC Ahal	3-4	Talyp Sporty Aşgabat	2-2	1-2
FC Altyn Asyr	10-3	Şagadam Türkmenbaşy	5-2	5-1

=== First leg ===
19 June 2010

FC Balkan	2 – 0	FC Daşoguz
Garadanow 60', 89'

Balkanabat Stadium, Balkanabat

19 June 2010

Merw Mary	1 – 0	FC Lebap
Tamurkin 50'

Mary Stadium, Mary

19 June 2010

FC Ahal	2 – 2	Talyp Sporty Aşgabat
Reznikow 40'; Tawarasýan 48'		Söýünow 44'; Orazmämmedow 57'

Ahal Stadium, Abadan

19 June 2010

FC Altyn Asyr	5 – 2	Şagadam Türkmenbaşy
Çöliýew 34'; Jumaýew 38'; Urazow 43'; Gurbani 45', 88' (pen.)		Boliýan 50', 68'

Ashgabat

=== Second leg ===
26 June 2010

FC Daşoguz	0 – 1	FC Balkan
		Zemskow 2'

Daşoguz Stadium, Daşoguz

26 June 2010

FC Lebap	1 – 2	Merw Mary
Alikperow 26' (pen.)		Pälwanow 22'; Hasanow 49'

Türkmenabat Stadium, Türkmenabat

26 June 2010

Talyp Sporty Aşgabat	2 – 1	FC Ahal
Orazmämmedow 12'; Söýünow 36'		Ataýew 60'

Köpetdag Stadium, Ashgabat

26 June 2010

Şagadam Türkmenbaşy	1 – 5	FC Altyn Asyr
Boliýan 19'		Çoňkaýew 24', 53'; Mirzoýew 41', 57'; Urazow 75'

Türkmenbaşy Stadium, Türkmenbaşy

== Semifinals ==
Team 1	Agg.	Team 2	1st leg	2nd leg
FC Balkan		Merw Mary	1 - 0	
Talyp Sporty Aşgabat		FC Altyn Asyr	0 - 2	

=== First leg ===
18 August 2010

FC Balkan	1 - 0	Merw Mary
Mirzoýew 19'

Balkanabat Stadium, Balkanabat

18 August 2010

Talyp Sporty Aşgabat	0 - 2	FC Altyn Asyr
		Çoňkaýew 30'; Berdiýew 57'

Köpetdag Stadium, Ashgabat

=== Second leg ===
Merw Mary	v	FC Balkan

Mary Stadium, Mary

FC Altyn Asyr	v	Talyp Sporty Aşgabat

Ashgabat

== Final ==
17 December 2010

FC Balkan	3 - 2	FC Altyn Asyr
Urazow 3'; Mirzoýew 16'; Batyrow 75'		Gurbani 67', 87'

Daşoguz Stadium, Daşoguz
Attendance: 9.500

== See also ==
- 2010 Turkmenistan League
