= 2013 Ýokary Liga =

Ýokary Liga
- Season: 2013
- Dates: 12 April – 30 November 2013
- Champions: HTTU Aşgabat
- AFC President's Cup: HTTU Aşgabat
- Top goalscorer: Mämmedaly Garadanow (26 goals)
- Biggest home win: HTTU 6–0 Daşoguz
- Biggest away win: Lebap 0–3 HTTU; Talyp Sporty 0–3 Aşgabat

2013 Ýokary Liga season was the 21st edition of the top tier professional Yokary Liga football annual competition in Turkmenistan administered by the Football Federation of Turkmenistan. It began on 12 April 2013 with the first round and ended on 30 November 2013.

== Teams ==
Location of teams in the Ýokary Liga 2013

Club	Location	Stadium	Capacity	Coach
Ahal	Abadan	Ahal Stadium	10,000	(Turkmenistan) Ali Gurbani
Altyn Asyr	Ashgabat	Köpetdag Stadium	26,000	(Turkmenistan) Baýram Durdyýew
Aşgabat	Ashgabat	Olympic	35,000	(Turkmenistan) Amangylyç Koçumow
Balkan	Balkanabat	Balkanabat Stadium	10,000	(Turkmenistan) Rahym Gurbanmämmedow
Daşoguz	Daşoguz	Daşoguz Stadium	10,000	(Turkmenistan)
Talyp Sporty	Ashgabat	Ashgabat Stadium	20,000	(Turkmenistan) Azat Muhadow
HTTU Aşgabat	Ashgabat	HTTU Stadium	1,000	(Turkmenistan) Ýazguly Hojageldiýew
Lebap	Türkmenabat	Türkmenabat Stadium	10,000	(Turkmenistan) Timur Husainow
Merw	Mary	Mary Stadium	10,000	(Turkmenistan) Magtym Begenjow
Şagadam	Türkmenbaşy	Şagadam Stadium	5,000	(Turkmenistan) Rejepmyrat Agabaýew

== League table ==
Pos	Team	Pld	W	D	L	GF	GA	GD	Pts	Qualification
1	HTTU (C)	36	28	3	5	85	27	+58	87	2014 AFC President's Cup
2	Balkan	36	28	2	6	86	25	+61	86	
3	Altyn Asyr	36	20	5	11	73	37	+36	65	
4	Aşgabat	36	20	4	12	76	52	+24	64	
5	Merw	36	16	9	11	52	37	+15	57	
6	Ahal	36	16	8	12	62	41	+21	56	
7	Şagadam	36	13	8	15	44	54	−10	47	
8	Lebap	36	6	5	25	40	82	−42	23	
9	Daşoguz	36	4	3	29	25	102	−77	15	
10	Talyp Sporty	36	3	5	28	22	108	−86	14	

Updated to match(es) played on 2 December 2013. Source: Futbol24
Rules for classification: 1) points; 2) goal difference; 3) number of goals scored.
(C) Champions

== Results ==
=== First half of season ===
Home \ Away	AHA	ALT	ASH	BAL	DAS	HTT	LEB	MER	SAG	TLP
Ahal					3–1		5–0	0–0	2–1	4–0
Altyn Asyr	3–1						3–0	1–1	2–0	1–0
Aşgabat	0–1	2–1				0–4	5–0	1–2		
Balkan	3–1				1–1			3–1		
Daşoguz		1–2	1–3				1–4			0–2
HTTU	1–0	2–1	2–1	2–3	6–0					
Lebap						0–3		1–2	0–1	0–1
Merw					4–1	3–2	1–0		0–0	1–0
Şagadam		2–0	0–1	1–1	6–0	2–1				
Talyp Sporty	1–1		0–3			0–5			1–1	

Updated to match(es) played on May 15, 2013. Source: http://www.tdh.gov.tm/
Legend: Blue = home team win; Yellow = draw; Red = away team win.

=== Second half of season ===
Home \ Away	AHA	ALT	ASH	BAL	DAS	HTT	LEB	MER	SAG	TLP
Ahal										
Altyn Asyr										
Aşgabat										
Balkan										
Daşoguz										
HTTU										
Lebap										
Merw										
Şagadam										
Talyp Sporty										

Updated to match(es) played on unknown. Source:
Legend: Blue = home team win; Yellow = draw; Red = away team win.

== Statistics ==
=== Top goalscorers ===
Rank	Player	Club	Goals
1	(Turkmenistan) Mämmedaly Garadanow	Balkan FT	26
2	(Turkmenistan) Süleýman Muhadow	HTTU Aşgabat	23
3	(Turkmenistan) Elman Tagaýew	Aşgabat FT	22

Source: RSSSF

=== Scoring ===
- First goalscorer:
  - Döwlet Ataýew for Ahal against Talyp Sporty, 11th minute (12 April 2013)
- First hat-trick:
  - Mämmedaly Garadanow for FC Balkan against FC Ahal (23 April 2013)
