= 2011 Ýokary Liga =

Ýokary Liga
- Season: 2011
- Champions: FC Balkan
- 2012 AFC President's Cup: FC Balkan
- Goals: 543 (after 36 matchdays)
- Average goals/game: 3.02
- Top goalscorer: Mämmedaly Garadanow (24 goals)

2011 Ýokary Liga season was the 19th edition of the top tier professional Yokary Liga football annual competition in Turkmenistan administered by the Football Federation of Turkmenistan. It began on 2 April 2011 with the first round of games and ended in November.

== Teams ==
Talyp Sporty Aşgabat were relegated. FC Gara Altyn as champions of the Turkmen second level of football were promoted. FC Balkan were renamed back to FC Nebitçi, then again back to FC Balkan within a week.

Location of teams in the 2011 Ýokary Liga

Club	Location	Stadium	Capacity	Coach
Ahal	Abadan	Ahal Stadium	10.000	(Turkmenistan) Armen Sogomonyan
Altyn Asyr	Ashgabat			(Turkmenistan) Ali Gurbani
Aşgabat	Ashgabat	Nisa-Çandybil Stadium	1.500	(Turkmenistan) Tofik Şukurow
Balkan	Balkanabat	Balkanabat Stadium	10.000	(Turkmenistan) Aleksandr Klimenko
Daşoguz	Daşoguz	Daşoguz Stadium	10.000	
Gara Altyn	Balkanabat	Balkanabat Stadium	10.000	(Turkmenistan) Amanmurad Meredow
HTTU Aşgabat	Ashgabat	HTTU Stadium	1.000	(Turkmenistan) Ýazguly Hojageldiýew
Lebap	Türkmenabat	Türkmenabat Stadium	10.000	(Turkmenistan) Rinat Habibullin
Merw	Mary	Mary Stadium	10.000	(Turkmenistan) Rahym Gurbanmämmedow
Şagadam	Türkmenbaşy	Türkmenbaşy Stadium	5.000	(Turkmenistan) Rejepmyrat Agabaýew

== League table ==
Pos	Team	Pld	W	D	L	GF	GA	GD	Pts	Qualification
1	Balkan (C)	36	26	4	6	78	30	+48	82	2012 AFC President's Cup
2	HTTU	36	25	5	6	85	28	+57	80	
3	Aşgabat	36	23	4	9	79	41	+38	72 (Note: FC Aşgabat and FC Altyn Asyr were both credited with a forfeit by Football Association of Turkmenistan due to non-observance of kit colors at the match played on 27.04.2011 (Matchday 7).)	
4	Merw	36	20	7	9	63	29	+34	67	
5	Şagadam	36	17	5	14	43	50	−7	56	
6	Altyn Asyr	36	12	9	15	46	42	+4	44	
7	Lebap	36	12	6	18	46	74	−28	42	
8	Ahal	36	9	4	23	40	82	−42	31	
9	Gara Altyn	36	7	3	26	37	83	−46	24	
10	Daşoguz	36	3	5	28	25	83	−58	14	

Updated to match(es) played on 26 November 2011. Source: (in Russian)
Rules for classification: 1) points; 2) goal difference; 3) number of goals scored.
(C) Champions

=== Positions by round ===
Team ╲ Round	1	2	3	4	5	6	7	8	9	10	11	12	13	14	15	16	17	18	19	20	21	22	23	24	25	26	27	28	29	30	31	32	33	34	35	36
Ahal	7	9	9	10	8	7	5	5	5	5	5	5	6	6	5	5	5	5	5	5	5	6														8
Altyn Asyr	1	5	5	5	6	5	6	6	6	6	6	6	5	5	6	6	7	7	6	6	6	8														6
Aşgabat	8	6	4	3	1	2	3	2	2	3	3	3	3	1	1	1	1	2	3	3	3	3														3
Balkan	4	2	1	1	2	3	4	4	4	4	4	4	4	4	4	4	4	1	1	1	1	1														1
Daşoguz	9	7	7	8	9	8	8	9	10	10	10	10	10	10	10	10	10	10	10	10	10	10														10
Gara Altyn	10	10	10	7	7	9	9	8	9	9	9	8	9	9	9	9	9	9	9	9	9	9														9
HTTU	2	1	2	2	4	4	2	3	3	2	2	2	2	3	2	2	2	3	2	2	2	2														2
Lebap	3	3	6	6	5	6	7	7	7	7	7	7	7	8	8	8	8	8	8	8	7	5														7
Merw	5	4	3	4	3	1	1	1	1	1	1	1	1	2	3	3	3	4	4	4	4	4														4
Şagadam	6	8	8	9	10	10	10	10	8	8	8	9	8	7	7	7	6	6	7	7	8	7														5

Updated to match(es) played on 27 August 2011. Source: the-afc.com (in Russian)

== Results ==
=== First half of season ===
Home \ Away	AHA	ALT	ASH	BAL	DAS	GAR	HTT	LEB	MER	SAG
Ahal		0–0	0–2	3–1	2–1	4–0	1–3	2–1	1–2	2–2
Altyn Asyr	1–3		1–2	0–3	1–0	1–0	1–1	2–2	1–1	0–2
Aşgabat	2–0	0–0		4–2	2–0	4–1	0–1	4–1	1–0	5–0
Balkan	2–0	1–0	3–0		8–0	1–0	2–1	3–0	1–0	3–1
Daşoguz	0–2	0–2	1–6	0–4		0–1	1–1	1–1	0–1	2–1
Gara Altyn	1–2	1–1	0–1	1–3	3–0		0–1	4–1	0–2	1–0
HTTU	2–1	2–1	1–0	1–3	4–2	2–0		4–1	2–1	7–1
Lebap	1–0	0–1	2–8	0–3	4–0	2–1	0–4		0–1	0–0
Merw	2–1	4–1	0–1	1–1	4–0	4–0	1–0	0–1		0–0
Şagadam	0–1	1–0	0–1	0–2	2–0	1–0	0–2	1–0	1–3	

Updated to match(es) played on 18 June 2011. Source: soccerway
Legend: Blue = home team win; Yellow = draw; Red = away team win.

=== Second half of season ===
Home \ Away	AHA	ALT	ASH	BAL	DAS	GAR	HTT	LEB	MER	SAG
Ahal		0–3	1–3	2–4	2–2	2–2	0–4	3–2	1–3	1–2
Altyn Asyr	4–0		3–0	0–1	2–0	5–1	0–1	1–2	1–2	2–0
Aşgabat	3–2	1–1		2–1	1–0	5–1	1–0	6–0	0–0	2–2
Balkan	5–0	1–1	2–0		1–1	3–0	2–1	3–2	2–1	2–0
Daşoguz	3–0	1–3	0–4	0–1		3–0	1–3	0–3	1–2	1–4
Gara Altyn	4–0	1–2	3–2	0–2	3–2		1–2	0–2	3–3	3–4
HTTU	7–0	2–1	3–0	1–1	2–1	9–0		4–1	2–0	3–0
Lebap	3–1	2–2	1–4	4–1	1–0	2–1	1–1		2–1	1–1
Merw	3–0	2–0	4–0	2–0	1–1	4–0	1–1	4–0		2–0
Şagadam	2–0	2–1	4–2	1–0	1–0	1–0	1–0	2–0	3–1	

Updated to match(es) played on 26 November 2011. Source: soccerway
Legend: Blue = home team win; Yellow = draw; Red = away team win.
