= 2009 Turkmenistan Cup =

Domestic football cup season in Turkmenistan

The Turkmenistan Cup 2009 is 17th since independence of the Turkmen national football cup. The competition will start on August 9, 2009 and finish with the Final played on a date to be announced.

== First round ==
The first round involved 16 teams. The matches were played on August 9 (first legs) and August 12, 2009 (second legs).

Team 1	Agg.	Team 2	1st leg	2nd leg
Turan Daşoguz	13-6	FC Gaýrat	8-4	5-2
Nebitçi Balkanabat	10-2	FC Galkynyş	2-1	8-1
Merw Mary	7-0	FC Dostluk	5-0	2-0
FC Aşgabat	5-3	FC Melik	4-1	1-2
FC Bagtyýarlyk	5-1	FC Bezirgen	4-1	1-0
FC Altyn Asyr	4-0	FC Bagyr	2-0	2-0
HTTU Aşgabat	5-1	FC Ahal	4-1	1-0
Talyp Sporty Aşgabat	1-2	Şagadam Türkmenbaşy	0-1	1-1

== Quarterfinals ==
The quarterfinal matches were played on August 19 (first legs) and August 22, 2009 (second legs).

Team 1	Agg.	Team 2	1st leg	2nd leg
Turan Daşoguz	1-7	Nebitçi Balkanabat	1-1	0-6
Merw Mary	4-2	FC Aşgabat	3-2	1-0
FC Bagtyýarlyk	2-7	FC Altyn Asyr	0-4	2-3
HTTU Aşgabat	6-2	Şagadam Türkmenbaşy	4-0	2-2

=== First leg ===
19 August 2009

Turan Daşoguz	1 – 1	Nebitçi Balkanabat

Daşoguz Stadium, Daşoguz

19 August 2009

Merw Mary	3 – 2	FC Aşgabat
Gurbanmuhammedow 60'; Alikperow 63', 70' (pen.)		50' Gurbanow; 87' Pälwanow

Mary Stadium, Mary

19 August 2009

FC Bagtyýarlyk	0 – 4	FC Altyn Asyr
		1', ?' Amanmämmedow ?' Seýdiýew; 17' Pürliýew

Türkmenabat Stadium, Türkmenabat

19 August 2009

HTTU Aşgabat	4 – 0	Şagadam Türkmenbaşy
Şamyradow 35', 37' (pen.), 79', 88'

HTTU Stadium, Ashgabat

=== Second leg ===
22 August 2009

Nebitçi Balkanabat	6 – 0	Turan Daşoguz
Parahat Meredow 1', 10', 39'; Zemskow 21', Tkaçenko ?', ?'

Balkanabat Stadium, Balkanabat

Nebitçi Balkanabat won 7–1 on aggregate.

22 August 2009

FC Aşgabat	0 – 1	Merw Mary
		66' Gurbanmuhammedow

Nisa-Çandybil Stadium, Ashgabat

Merw Mary won 4–2 on aggregate.

22 August 2009

FC Altyn Asyr	3 – 2	FC Bagtyýarlyk
Gurbannepesow 9'; Amanmämmedow 66'; Meýmanow 68'		55' Rahimberdi Baltaýew; 64' Jumagulyýew

Ashgabat

Altyn Asyr won 7–2 on aggregate.

22 August 2009

Şagadam Türkmenbaşy	2 – 2	HTTU Aşgabat
Boliýan 45'; Sallarow 45'		25' Hojaahmet Arazow; 70' Baýramow

Türkmenbaşy Stadium, Türkmenbaşy

HTTU Aşgabat won 6–2 on aggregate.

== Semifinals ==
The first legs were played on August 26 and second on August 29, 2009.

Team 1	Agg.	Team 2	1st leg	2nd leg
Merw Mary	2-1	Nebitçi Balkanabat	2-0	0-1
HTTU Aşgabat	3-3(a)	FC Altyn Asyr	3-3	0-0

=== First leg ===
26 August 2009

Merw Mary	2 – 0	Nebitçi Balkanabat
Aýrumýan 20'; Alikperow 26'

Mary Stadium, Mary

26 August 2009

HTTU Aşgabat	3 – 3	FC Altyn Asyr
Berdi Şamyradow 5' (pen.), 51' (pen.); Azat Garajaýew 66'		18' (pen.) Amir Gurbani; 39' Hemra Amanmämmedow; 41' Azat Pürliýew

HTTU Stadium, Ashgabat

=== Second leg ===
29 August 2009

Nebitçi Balkanabat	1 – 0	Merw Mary
Mämmedaly Garadanow 11'

Balkanabat Stadium, Balkanabat

Merw Mary won 2–1 on aggregate.

29 August 2009

FC Altyn Asyr	0 – 0	HTTU Aşgabat

FC Altyn Asyr won 3–3 on away goals.

== Final ==
14 November 2009
15:00 (UTC+5)

FC Altyn Asyr	3 - 0	Merw Mary
Gurbannepesow 5'; Alikperow 7' (o.g.); Baýlyýew 16'

Olympic Stadium, Ashgabat

== See also ==
- 2009 Turkmenistan League
