= 2009 Ýokary Liga =

Football season

Ýokary Liga
- Season: 2009
- Champions: HTTU Aşgabat; 3rd Ýokary Liga title
- Runner up: Nebitçi Balkanabat
- Goals: 209 (after 18 matchdays)
- Average goals/game: 2.9
- Top goalscorer: (Turkmenistan) Berdi Şamyradow (18)
- Biggest home win: HTTU 9–3 Turan (12 June 2009)
- Biggest away win: Aşgabat 1–8 Nebitçi (19 September 2009)
- Highest scoring: HTTU 9–3 Turan (12 June 2009)

2009 Ýokary Liga season was the 17th edition of the top tier professional Yokary Liga football annual competition in Turkmenistan administered by the Football Federation of Turkmenistan. It began on 25 April 2009 with the first round of games and ended on 7 November 2009 with the 18th round of matches.

FC Aşgabat is the defending champions. The first half of the season finished on 27 June 2009. The kick-off of the second half was on 4 September 2009.

== Team changes from last season ==
Gara Altyn Balkanabat and FC Ahal withdrew from the league.

=== Format change ===
The format of the league was unchanged. With as few sides as 9 that participated, every team played 2 times each other for a total of 16 games. Since one team will be bye each matchday, a total 18 matchdays were played.

== Overview ==
Location of teams in the Ýokary Liga 2009

Club	Location	Stadium	Capacity	Coach
Altyn Asyr	Ashgabat			Gurbani
Aşgabat	Ashgabat	Nisa-Çandybil Stadium	1.500	(Turkmenistan) Boris Grigoryans
Bagtyýarlyk	Türkmenabat	Türkmenabat Stadium	10.000	
HTTU Aşgabat	Ashgabat	HTTU Stadium	1.000	(Turkmenistan) Ýazguly Hojageldiýew
Merw	Mary	Mary Stadium	10.000	
Nebitçi	Balkanabat	Balkanabat Stadium	10.000	(Turkmenistan) Amanmyrat Meredow
Şagadam	Türkmenbaşy	Türkmenbaşy Stadium	5.000	(Turkmenistan) Ismailow
Talyp Sporty	Ashgabat	Köpetdag Stadium	25.000	(Turkmenistan) Durdyýew
Turan	Daşoguz	Daşoguz Stadium	12.000	

== Standings ==
Pos	Team	Pld	W	D	L	GF	GA	GD	Pts	Qualification
1	HTTU (C)	16	12	4	0	44	14	+30	40	2010 AFC President's Cup (Note: Winners of qualify for the 2010 AFC President's Cup.)
2	Nebitçi	16	12	2	2	35	11	+24	38	
3	Merw	16	10	3	3	31	15	+16	33	
4	Aşgabat	16	9	2	5	24	24	0	29	
5	Altyn Asyr	16	6	2	8	20	23	−3	20	
6	Talyp Sporty	16	4	4	8	15	25	−10	16	
7	Şagadam	16	4	2	10	17	28	−11	14	
8	Turan Daşoguz	16	3	1	12	17	39	−22	10	
9	Lebap	16	1	2	13	6	30	−24	5	

Updated to match(es) played on 14 November 2009. Source: (in Turkmen)
Rules for classification: 1) points; 2) goal difference; 3) number of goals scored.
(C) Champions

=== Positions by round ===
Team ╲ Round	1	2	3	4	5	6	7	8	9	10	11	12	13	14	15	16	17	18
Altyn Asyr	6	8	6	4	3	3	5	6	6	6	6	6	7	7	7	5	5	5
Aşgabat	5	5	7	7	7	5	3	3	4	4	4	4	4	4	4	3	4	4
Lebap	7	7	9	9	9	9	8	8	8	8	8	9	9	9	9	9	9	9
HTTU	1	4	4	3	1	1	1	1	1	1	1	1	1	1	1	1	1	1
Merw	3	2	1	1	2	2	2	4	3	3	3	3	3	3	3	4	3	3
Nebitçi	4	3	3	5	6	6	4	2	2	2	2	2	2	2	2	2	2	2
Şagadam	8	6	5	6	5	7	7	7	7	7	7	8	6	6	6	7	7	7
Talyp Sporty	2	1	2	2	4	4	6	5	5	5	5	5	5	5	5	6	6	6
Turan Daşoguz	9	9	8	8	8	8	9	9	9	9	9	7	8	8	8	8	8	8

Source: (in Turkmen)

== Results ==
=== League season ===
Home \ Away	ALT	ASH	LEB	HTT	MER	NEB	SAG	TLP	DAS
Altyn Asyr		3–0	0–1	1–5	0–2	1–3	3–2	0–0	6–2
Aşgabat	2–1		2–0	1–1	2–2	1–8	3–0	2–1	1–0
Lebap	0–1	1–3		0–1	0–2	0–1	0–2	0–1	1–1
HTTU	1–1	3–0	3–1		1–1	3–0	3–2	2–0	9–3
Merw	3–1	1–0	4–0	0–2		0–1	2–1	1–1	2–0
Nebitçi	1–0	2–1	4–1	1–1	0–1		4–1	3–0	2–0
Şagadam	1–0	0–1	1–0	0–1	2–4	1–1		1–1	2–1
Talyp Sporty	0–1	0–1	1–1	1–4	2–5	0–2	3–1		2–1
Turan Daşoguz	0–1	1–4	3–0	2–4	2–1	0–2	1–0	0–2	

Updated to match(es) played on 14 November 2009. Source:
Legend: Blue = home team win; Yellow = draw; Red = away team win.

== Top goalscorers ==
Position	Player	Club	Goals
1	(Turkmenistan) Berdi Şamyradow	HTTU Aşgabat	18
2	(Turkmenistan) Gurbanmuhammedow	Merw Mary	11
3	(Turkmenistan) Mämmedaly Garadanow	Nebitçi Balkanabat	10
3	(Turkmenistan) Didargylyç Urazow	FC Altyn Asyr	10
Total goals			209
Total games			72
Average per game			2.90

Last updated: 14 November 2009

== Statistics ==
=== Scoring ===
- First goalscorer:
  - Hojaahmet Arazow for HTTU Aşgabat against Bagtyýarlyk, 33rd minute (25 April 2009)
- Widest winning margin: 7 Goals
  - FC Aşgabat 1–8 Nebitçi Balkanabat (19 September 2009)
- Most goals in a match: 12 Goals
  - HTTU Aşgabat 9–3 Turan (12 June 2009)
- Most goals in a draw: 4 Goals
  - Aşgabat 2–2 Merw (27 June 2009)
- Most goals in a match by one team: 9 Goals
  - HTTU Aşgabat 9–3 Turan (12 June 2009)
- Most goals scored by losing team: 3 goals
  - HTTU Aşgabat 9–3 Turan (12 June 2009)
- First hat-trick of the season:
  - Berdi Şamyradow for HTTU Aşgabat against Nebitçi (16 May 2009)
- Most goals in a match by one player: 4 goals
  - Berdi Şamyradow for HTTU Aşgabat against Turan Daşoguz (12 June 2009)
  - Mämmedaly Garadanow for Nebitçi Balkanabat against FC Aşgabat (19 September 2009)
  - Didargylyç Urazow for FC Altyn Asyr against Turan Daşoguz (3 October 2009)
  - Gurbanmuhammedow for Merw Mary against Talyp Sporty Aşgabat (24 October 2009)

== International competitions ==
=== CIS Cup 2009 ===
- CIS Cup 2009:

Aşgabat – Russia U-21 (0–0)
Aşgabat – (Belarus) MTZ-RIPO Minsk (0–4)
(Lithuania) FK Ekranas – Aşgabat (3–1)

=== AFC President's Cup 2009 ===
- AFC President's Cup 2009:

Aşgabat – Sri Lanka Army (5–1)
(Bangladesh) Abahani Ltd. – Aşgabat (0–0)
Aşgabat – (Kyrgyzstan) Dordoi-Dynamo (1–2)

== See also ==
- 2009 Turkmenistan Cup
