= Ýagmyrmyrat Annamyradow =

Turkmen footballer

Personal information
- Date of birth: 19 October 1982 (age 44)
- Place of birth: Nebit-Dag, Turkmen SSR, USSR
- Position: Defender

Team information
- Current team: Şagadam FK (coach)

Youth career
- 1998-1999: SMM+

Senior career*
Years	Team	Apps	(Gls)
2002–2003	Köpetdag Aşgabat		
2003–2004	Asudalyk		
2004	Nebitchi		
- HTTU
- Merv
2007–2008	Navbahor	28	(0)
2009	HTTU		
2010–2018	Balkan		

International career^{‡}
2007–2017	Turkmenistan	11	(0)

Managerial career
- 2018–2019: Nebitçi (assistant)
- 2019–: Şagadam (coach)
- * Club domestic league appearances and goals as of 6 March 2019 ‡ National team caps and goals as of 6 March 2019

Yagmyrmyrat Kulanmyradovich Annamyradov (Turkmen: Ýagmyrmyrat Kulanmyradowiç Annamyradow; born 19 October 1982) is a retired Turkmen professional footballer, who played as defender. He was part of the Turkmenistan national team from 2007.

== Club career ==
Yagmyrmyrat Annamyradow began his professional career in 1998 in SMM+ football team.

In the Ýokary Liga perform for Köpetdag Aşgabat, Asudalyk, FC HTTU and FC Merw. On 2007 Annamyradow joined the Uzbek League club Navbahor Namangan. In 2009, he returned to Turkmenistan, to FC HTTU. Since 2010, the player of FC Balkan, is the team captain.

On 2017, Annamyradow announced his retirement as a professional footballer. The Football Federation of the Balkan Region appreciated the contribution of Annamyradow to the development of football by presenting the player with commemorative prizes and a diploma.

== Coaching career ==
On 2018, he was hired as coach by the Ýokary Liga club FC Balkan.

On 2019, he was appointed an assistant coach at FC Şagadam with Aleksandr Klimenko as the head coach.

== Honours ==
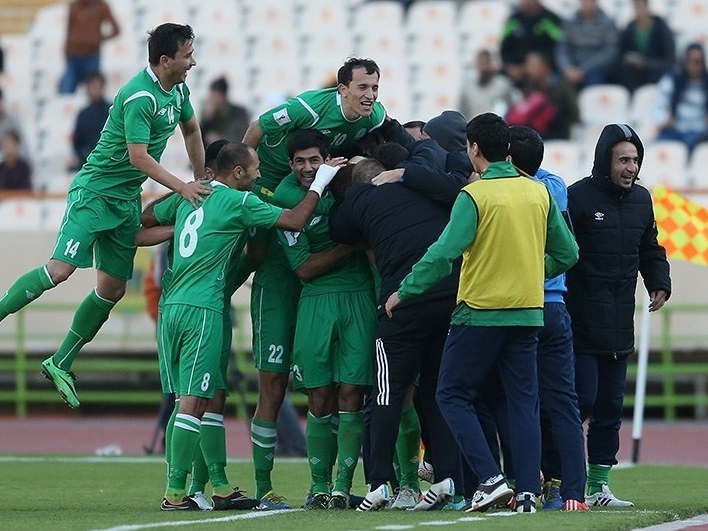
With Turkmenistan in World Cup Qualifying

=== Club ===
FC Balkan

- Ýokary Liga: 2004, 2010, 2011, 2012
- AFC President's Cup: 2013
- Turkmenistan Cup: 2010, 2012
- Turkmenistan Super Cup: 2006, 2011, 2012
