= Pavel Harçik =

Turkmenistani footballer

Personal information
- Date of birth: April 5, 1979 (age 47)
- Place of birth: Dushanbe, Soviet Union
- Height: 1.96 m (6 ft 5 in)
- Position: Goalkeeper

Senior career*
Years	Team	Apps	(Gls)
1999–2000	Nisa Asgabat		
2001	FC Kristall Smolensk	9	(0)
2001–2003	Rubin Kazan	21	(0)
2004	FC Neftekhimik Nizhnekamsk	3	(0)
2004–2008	Rubin Kazan	15	(0)
2008	→ Anzhi (loan)	19	(0)
2009	FC Aşgabat		
2009	Karvan	7	(0)
2010	Standard Sumgayit	11	(0)
2010–2011	Altyn Asyr		
2011	Qizilqum Zarafshon	13	(0)
2012	Olmaliq	18	(0)

International career^{‡}
2004–2009	Turkmenistan	9	(0)
- * Club domestic league appearances and goals as of 10 July 2019 ‡ National team caps and goals as of 10 July 2019

Pavel Harçik (born 5 April 1979) is a former Turkmenistani professional football goalkeeper. He is ethnically Russian.

== Career statistics ==
=== Club ===
As of match played 17 November 2012

Appearances and goals by club, season and competition
Club	Season	League			National Cup		Continental		Other		Total	
Club	Season	Division	Apps	Goals	Apps	Goals	Apps	Goals	Apps	Goals	Apps	Goals
Nisa Aşgabat	1998–99	Ýokary Liga					-		-			
Nisa Aşgabat	2000	Ýokary Liga					-		-			
Nisa Aşgabat	Total						-	-	-	-		
Kristall Smolensk	2001	Russian First Division	9	0			–		–		9	0
Rubin Kazan	2001	Russian First Division	9	0			–		–		9	0
Rubin Kazan	2002	Russian First Division	8	0			–		–		8	0
Rubin Kazan	2003	Russian Premier League	4	0	2	0	–		–		6	0
Rubin Kazan	Total		21	0	2	0	-	-	-	-	23	0
Neftekhimik Nizhnekamsk	2004	Russian First Division	3	0			–		–		3	0
Rubin Kazan	2004	Russian Premier League	0	0	0	0	–		–		0	0
Rubin Kazan	2005	Russian Premier League	13	0	2	0	–		–		15	0
Rubin Kazan	2006	Russian Premier League	1	0	1	0	1	0	–		3	0
Rubin Kazan	2007	Russian Premier League	1	0	1	0	0	0	–		2	0
Rubin Kazan	2008	Russian Premier League	0	0	0	0	0	0	–		0	0
Rubin Kazan	Total		15	0	4	0	1	0	-	-	20	0
Anzhi Makhachkala (loan)	2008	Russian First Division	19	0	0	0	–		–		19	0
Aşgabat	2009	Ýokary Liga					2	0	–		2	0
Karvan	2009–10	Azerbaijan Premier League	7	0			–		–		7	0
Standard Sumgayit	2009–10	Azerbaijan Premier League	11	0			–		–		11	0
Altyn Asyr	2010	Ýokary Liga					-		-			
Altyn Asyr	2011	Ýokary Liga					-		-			
Altyn Asyr	Total						-	-	-	-		
Qizilqum Zarafshon	2011	Uzbek League	13	0			–		–		13	0
Olmaliq	2012	Uzbek League	18	0			–		–		18	0
Career total			116	0	6	0	3	0	-	-	125	0

=== International ===
Turkmenistan national team
Year	Apps	Goals
1999	1	0
2000	0	0
2001	0	0
2002	0	0
2003	0	0
2004	3	0
2005	0	0
2006	0	0
2007	2	0
2008	2	0
2009	2	0
Total	10	0

Statistics accurate as of match played 18 April 2009
