= 2010 Ýokary Liga =

Ýokary Liga
- Season: 2010
- Champions: FC Balkan
- Goals: 225 (after 18 matchdays)
- Average goals/game: 2.81
- Biggest home win: Merw 6–0 Altyn Asyr; Aşgabat 6–0 Talyp Sporty
- Biggest away win: Daşoguz 0–7 Balkan
- Highest scoring: Berdi Şamyradow (11 goals)

2010 Ýokary Liga season was the 18th edition of the top tier professional Yokary Liga football annual competition in Turkmenistan administered by the Football Federation of Turkmenistan. It began on 2 April 2010 with the first round of games and ended in December.

FC Balkan won the title.

== Teams ==
As league size were expanded from nine to ten teams, no team had to face relegation after the conclusion of the 2009 season. FC Ahal as champions of the Turkmen second level of football were promoted. FC Bagtyýarlyk, Nebitçi Balkanabat and Turan Daşoguz were renamed FC Lebap, FC Balkan and FC Daşoguz, respectively.

Location of teams in the 2010 Ýokary Liga

Club	Location	Stadium	Capacity	Coach
Ahal	Abadan	Ahal Stadium	10.000	(Turkmenistan) Röwşen Muhadow
Altyn Asyr	Ashgabat			(Turkmenistan) Ali Gurbani
Aşgabat	Ashgabat	Nisa-Çandybil Stadium	1.500	(Turkmenistan) Aman Goçumow
Balkan	Balkanabat	Balkanabat Stadium	10.000	(Turkmenistan) Rejepmyrat Agabaýew
Daşoguz	Daşoguz	Daşoguz Stadium	10.000	
HTTU Aşgabat	Ashgabat	HTTU Stadium	1.000	(Turkmenistan) Ýazguly Hojageldiýew
Lebap	Türkmenabat	Türkmenabat Stadium	10.000	(Turkmenistan) Waleriý Kirillow
Merw	Mary	Mary Stadium	10.000	(Turkmenistan) Rahym Gurbanmämmedow
Şagadam	Türkmenbaşy	Türkmenbaşy Stadium	5.000	(Turkmenistan) Gudrat Ismailow
Talyp Sporty	Ashgabat	Köpetdag Stadium	25.000	(Turkmenistan) Baýram Durdyýew

== League table ==
Pos	Team	Pld	W	D	L	GF	GA	GD	Pts	Qualification
1	Balkan (C)	18	12	4	2	35	8	+27	40	2011 AFC President's Cup
2	Altyn Asyr	18	10	5	3	34	20	+14	35	
3	Lebap	18	10	4	4	29	12	+17	34	
4	Merw	18	9	6	3	33	15	+18	33	
5	HTTU	18	7	7	4	26	16	+10	28	
6	Aşgabat	18	7	5	6	29	19	+10	26	
7	Şagadam	18	6	5	7	15	22	−7	23	
8	Ahal	18	5	1	12	13	33	−20	16	
9	Daşoguz	18	2	3	13	7	37	−30	9	
10	Talyp Sporty	18	0	4	14	4	40	−36	4	

Updated to match(es) played on 11 December 2010. Source: (in Russian)
Rules for classification: 1) points; 2) goal difference; 3) number of goals scored.
(C) Champions

=== Positions by round ===
Team ╲ Round	1	2	3	4	5	6	7	8	9	10	11	12	13	14	15	16	17	18
Ahal	2	2	4	2	5	3	3	5	7	7	7	7	7	8	7	8	8	8
Altyn Asyr	3	1	3	6	8	8	5	6	3	3	3	2	2	2	2	2	2	2
Aşgabat	4	8	9	9	9	9	9	9	8	8	8	8	8	6	8	6	7	6
Balkan	1	3	1	1	1	1	1	1	1	1	1	1	1	1	1	1	1	1
Daşoguz	9	4	2	4	7	7	8	8	9	9	9	9	9	9	9	9	9	9
HTTU	5	6	6	3	3	4	4	3	4	4	5	5	6	4	5	5	5	5
Lebap	10	7	8	5	2	2	2	2	2	2	2	3	4	3	4	4	3	3
Merw	6	5	7	8	6	5	6	4	5	5	4	4	3	5	3	3	4	4
Şagadam	7	9	5	7	4	6	7	7	6	6	6	6	5	7	6	7	6	7
Talyp Sporty	8	10	10	10	10	10	10	10	10	10	10	10	10	10	10	10	10	10

Source: (in Russian)

== Results ==
=== League season ===
Home \ Away	AHA	ALT	ASH	BAL	DAS	HTT	LEB	MER	SAG	TLP
Ahal		0–4	1–2	1–3	2–0	0–3	1–2	0–1	2–0	3–0
Altyn Asyr	3–0		5–2	2–1	0–0	2–2	3–2	1–0	2–0	0–0
Aşgabat	4–0	1–1		0–1	5–1	3–0	0–0	1–0	0–0	6–0
Balkan	3–0	2–0	1–2		4–1	0–0	2–1	1–0	3–0	3–0
Daşoguz	1–2	1–4	1–0	0–7		0–3	0–1	0–1	0–1	0–0
HTTU	0–0	1–1	2–0	0–0	1–0		0–1	2–2	3–2	2–0
Lebap	3–0	1–0	2–2	0–1	4–0	2–0		1–1	2–0	3–0
Merw	3–0	6–0	3–1	1–1	1–1	1–1	2–1		5–2	3–2
Şagadam	1–0	1–4	1–0	0–0	1–0	1–0	0–0	0–0		1–1
Talyp Sporty	0–1	0–2	0–0	0–2	0–1	1–6	0–3	0–3	0–1	

Updated to match(es) played on 11 December 2010. Source:
Legend: Blue = home team win; Yellow = draw; Red = away team win.

== Season statistics ==
=== Top scorers ===
Including matches played on 11 December 2010

Rank	Scorer	Club	Goals
1	(Turkmenistan) Berdi Şamyradow	HTTU Aşgabat	11
2	(Turkmenistan) Didargylyç Urazow	FC Balkan	10
2	(Turkmenistan) Amir Gurbani	FC Altyn Asyr	10
2	(Turkmenistan) Gahrymanberdi Çoňkaýew	FC Altyn Asyr	10

=== Scoring ===
- First goalscorer:
  - Didargylyç Urazow for FC Balkan against Lebap, 26th minute (2 April 2010)
- First hat-trick:
  - Ata Geldiýew for FC Aşgabat against FC Ahal (15 May 2010)

== International competitions ==
=== 2010 CIS Cup ===
- 2010 CIS Cup:

(Estonia) FC Levadia Tallinn – HTTU Aşgabat (1–3)
HTTU Aşgabat – Russia U-21 (2–4)
HTTU Aşgabat – (Ukraine) FC Dynamo Kyiv (2–4)
(Uzbekistan) FC Bunyodkor – HTTU Aşgabat (1–1) (2–4 pen.)
HTTU Aşgabat – (Russia) Rubin Kazan (0–4)

=== 2010 AFC President's Cup ===
- 2010 AFC President's Cup:

HTTU Aşgabat – (Bhutan) Druk Star FC (8–0)
(Myanmar) Yadanabon FC – HTTU Aşgabat (0–0)
(Kyrgyzstan) Dordoi-Dynamo Naryn – HTTU Aşgabat (2–0)
