= 2012 Ýokary Liga =

Ýokary Liga
- Season: 2012
- Champions: Balkan
- AFC President's Cup: Balkan

2012 Ýokary Liga season was the 20th edition of the top tier professional Yokary Liga football annual competition in Turkmenistan administered by the Football Federation of Turkmenistan. It started on 10 April 2012 with the first round and ended in November.

== Teams ==
Club	Location	Stadium	Capacity	Coach
Ahal	Abadan	Ahal Stadium	10.000	(Turkmenistan) Baýramdurdy Durdyýew
Altyn Asyr	Ashgabat	Köpetdag Stadium	26.000	(Turkmenistan) Ali Gurbani
Aşgabat	Abadan	Nisa-Çandybil Stadium	10.000	(Turkmenistan) Aman Goçumow
Balkan	Balkanabat	Balkanabat Stadium	10.000	(Turkey) Semih Yuvakuran
Talyp Sporty	Abadan	Ahal Stadium	10.000	(Turkmenistan) Azat Muhadow
HTTU Aşgabat	Ashgabat	HTTU Stadium	1.000	(Turkmenistan) Ýazguly Hojageldiýew
Lebap	Türkmenabat	Türkmenabat Stadium	10.000	(Turkmenistan) Rinat Habibullin
Merw	Mary	Mary Stadium	10.000	(Turkmenistan) Rahym Gurbanmämmedow
Şagadam	Türkmenbaşy	Şagadam Stadium	5.000	(Turkmenistan) Rejepmyrat Agabaýew

== League table ==
Pos	Team	Pld	W	D	L	GF	GA	GD	Pts	Qualification
1	Balkan (C)	32	23	4	5	66	19	+47	73	2013 AFC President's Cup
2	Merw	32	21	9	2	58	26	+32	72	
3	HTTU	32	15	11	6	48	20	+28	56	
4	Ahal	32	15	5	12	59	45	+14	50	
5	Şagadam	32	14	5	13	43	39	+4	47	
6	Altyn Asyr	32	13	7	12	46	39	+7	46	
7	Talyp Sporty	32	6	4	22	23	70	−47	22	
8	Lebap	32	6	3	23	30	69	−39	21	
9	Aşgabat	32	5	4	23	28	80	−52	19	

Updated to match(es) played on 10 Nov, 2012. Source: (in English)
Rules for classification: 1) points; 2) goal difference; 3) number of goals scored.
(C) Champions

== Top goal-scorers ==
The top scorers are:

Rank	Scorer	Club	Goals (Pen.)
1	(Turkmenistan) Aleksandr Boliyan	FC Şagadam	23
2	(Turkmenistan) Mämmedaly Garadanow	FC Balkan	16
3	(Turkmenistan) Didar Durdyýew	FC Ahal	14
3	(Turkmenistan) Ýusup Orazmämmedow	FC Merw	14
5	(Turkmenistan) Guwançmuhammet Öwekow	FC Balkan	12
