= List of football clubs in Turkmenistan =

This is a list of football clubs in Turkmenistan.

- Arwana FK
- FC Ahal
- FC Altyn Asyr
- FC Aşgabat
- FC Balkan
- FC Daşoguz
- Energetik
- FC Gara Altyn
- FC Lebap
- HTTU Aşgabat
- Köpetdag Aşgabat
- Merw Mary
- Nebitçi FT
- Nisa Aşgabat
- Şagadam FK
- Talyp Sporty Aşgabat
