= 2025 Turkmenistan Cup =

Türkmenistanyň Kubogy 2025

Tournament details
- Country: Turkmenistan
- Dates: 20 May -
- Teams: 8

Final positions
- Champions: Arkadag

Tournament statistics
- Matches played: 12
- Goals scored: 42 (3.5 per match)
- Top goal scorer(s): Didar Durdyýew (4 goals)
- All statistics correct as of 18 December 2025.

The 2025 Turkmenistan Cup (Turkmen: Türkmenistanyň Kubogy 2025) is the 32nd season of the Turkmenistan Cup knockout tournament. 8 Ýokary Liga clubs entered the competition, which began with the quarter-final round on 20 May 2025. The tournament is organized by the Football Federation of Turkmenistan.

The tournament winner will earn a spot in the 2026–27 AFC Challenge League and the 2025 Turkmenistan Super Cup.

== Bracket ==
The eight teams of the 2025 Ýokary Liga entered the competition, with the draw taking place on 21 April.

Quarter-finals
Altyn Asyr	1	2	3
Aşgabat	2	3	5
Arkadag	6	3	9
Nebitçi	0	1	1
Şagadam	0	4	4
Merw	0	1	1
Ahal	2	1	3
Köpetdag	2	0	2

Semi-finals
Aşgabat	1	1	2
Arkadag	3	4	7
Şagadam	2	0	2
Ahal	1	2	3

Final
Arkadag	2
Ahal	1

== Quarter-finals ==
20 May 2025	Arkadag	6–0	Nebitçi	Arkadag
(UTC+5)	Akmämmedow 28'; Tirkişow 45+2'; Annadurdyýew 50'; Hydyrow 51'; Durdyýew 74'; Agabayev 90'	Report		Stadium: Arkadag Stadium; Referee: Kh. Gurbanov

17 June 2025	Nebitçi	1–3 (1–9 agg.)	Arkadag	Balkanabat
(UTC+5)	Yakubov 42' (pen.)	Report	Akmämmedow 7'; Tirkişow 13'; Durdyýew 49'	Stadium: Sport Toplumy Stadium; Referee: H.Rejepov

20 May 2025	Şagadam	0–0	Merw	Türkmenbaşy
(UTC+5)		Report		Stadium: Şagadam Stadium; Referee: A. Goshshanov

18 June 2025	Merw	1–4 (1–4 agg.)	Şagadam	Mary
(UTC+5)	Ovezmuradov 81'	Report	Dzhumadurdyev 18'; Makhtymov 45+2' (pen.); Dovletgeldyev 57' (pen.); Ataev 61'	Stadium: Mary Sport Toplumy; Referee: B. Atdyev

21 May 2025	Altyn Asyr	1–2	Aşgabat	Ashgabat
(UTC+5)	Halmamedov 90+2' (pen.)	Report	Nurlyev 36', 45+1'	Stadium: Buzmeyin Sport Complex; Referee: R. Mamedov

18 June 2025	Aşgabat	3–2 (5–3 agg.)	Altyn Asyr	Ashgabat
(UTC+5)	Gurbanberdiyev 21', 31', 86'	Report	Halmamedov 4', 37'	Stadium: Nusaý Stadium; Referee: E. Annamuradov

21 May 2025	Ahal	2–2	Köpetdag	Ashgabat
(UTC+5)	Govshudov 45+3'; Bayov 82'	Report	Seyidov 45+2', 79'	Stadium: Nusaý Stadium; Referee: B. Atdyev

17 June 2025	Köpetdag	0–1 (2–3 agg.)	Ahal	Ashgabat
(UTC+5)		Report	Meredov 8'	Stadium: Köpetdag Stadium; Referee: A. Sapaev

== Semi-finals ==
20 November 2025	Aşgabat	1–3	Arkadag	Ashgabat
(UTC+5)	Pirkulyýew 38' (pen.)	Report	I.Çaryýew 23'; Akmämmedow 42'; Urazov 59'	Stadium: Nusaý Stadium; Referee: D. Muradov

18 December 2025	Arkadag	4–1 (7–2 agg.)	Aşgabat	Arkadag
(UTC+5)	Durdyýew 21', 86'; Ataýew 45+1'; Urazov 88'	Report	Nurlyev 37'	Stadium: Arkadag Stadium; Referee: A.Begnazarov

20 November 2025	Şagadam	2–1	Ahal	Türkmenbaşy
(UTC+5)	Bekçanow 2'; Garaýew 86'	Report	Towakelow 27'	Stadium: Şagadam Stadium; Referee: A. Goshshanov

18 December 2025	Ahal	2–0 (3–2 agg.)	Şagadam	Ashgabat
(UTC+5)	Gurgenov 35'; Metdayev 49'	Report		Stadium: Nusaý Stadium; Referee: R.Mamedov

== Final ==
2025
(UTC+5)
Final

Arkadag	2–1	Ahal
	Report

Arkadag Stadium, Arkadag

== Goal scorers ==
As of match played 18 December 2025

Rank	Player	Club	Goals
1	(Turkmenistan) Didar Durdyýew	Arkadag	4
2	(Turkmenistan) Begenç Akmämmedow	Arkadag	3
2	(Turkmenistan) Bashim Gurbanberdiyev	Aşgabat	3
2	(Turkmenistan) Rovshegeldy Halmamedov	Altyn Asyr	3
2	(Turkmenistan) Mergen Nurlyev	Aşgabat	3
6	(Turkmenistan) Orazgeldy Seyidov	Köpetdag	2
6	(Turkmenistan) Şanazar Tirkişow	Arkadag	2
6	(Turkmenistan) Diyargylych Urazov	Arkadag	2
8	20 players	Various	1

== See also ==
- 2025 Ýokary Liga
