= 2025 Ýokary Liga =

Ýokary Liga
- Season: 2025
- Dates: 4 March – 15 December
- Champions: Arkadag
- Matches: 76
- Goals: 221 (2.91 per match)
- Top goalscorer: Didar Durdyýew (20 goals)
- Biggest home win: Arkadag 7–0 Merw (2 April 2025); Arkadag 7–0 Aşgabat (21 June 2025)
- Biggest away win: Nebitçi 1–8 Arkadag (11 August 2025)
- Highest scoring: Arkadag 7–3 Altyn Asyr (27 June 2025)
- Longest winning run: Arkadag (19)
- Longest unbeaten run: Arkadag (19)
- Longest winless run: Köpetdag (8); Nebitçi (8)
- Longest losing run: Köpetdag (5); Nebitçi (5)

The 2025 Ýokary Liga was the 33rd edition of the top tier professional Yokary Liga football annual competition in Turkmenistan administered by the Football Federation of Turkmenistan. FK Arkadag entered the season as the two-time defending champions, having won their 2nd consecutive league title in the previous season.

== Season events ==
Prior to the start of the league season, it was announced that eight teams would participate in the season, beginning on 4 March.

== Teams ==
Team	Location	Venue	Capacity
Arkadag	Arkadag	Nusaý Stadium; Arkadag Stadium	3,000; 10,000
Ahal	Anau (Ahal Region)	Ashgabat Stadium; Babarap Sport Complex	20,000; 1,000
Altyn Asyr	Ashgabat	Buzmeyin Sport Complex	10,000
Aşgabat	Ashgabat	Ashgabat Stadium; Babarap Sport Complex	20,000; 1,000
Nebitçi	Balkanabat (Balkan Region)	Balkanabat Sport Complex	10,000
Köpetdag Aşgabat	Ashgabat	Köpetdag Stadium	26,000
Merw	Mary (Mary Region)	Mary Sport Complex	10,000
Şagadam	Türkmenbaşy (Balkan Region)	Şagadam Stadium; Balkanabat Sport Complex	1,500; 10,000

== Personnel and sponsoring ==
Team	Manager/Head coach	Captain	Kit manufacturer	Sponsor
Arkadag	(Turkmenistan) Wladimir Baýramow	(Turkmenistan) Abdy Bäşimow	Jako	Arkadag City
Ahal	(Turkmenistan) Welsähet Öwezow	(Turkmenistan) Elman Tagaýew	Hummel	TNÖ / Dragon Oil
Altyn Asyr	(Turkmenistan) Ýazguly Hojageldiýew	(Turkmenistan)	Adidas	TM CELL
Aşgabat	(Turkmenistan) Tofik Şukurow		Kelme	
Nebitçi	(Turkmenistan) Aleksandr Klimenko	Wezirgeldi Ylýasow	Adidas	Mitro International Limited
Köpetdag Aşgabat	(Turkmenistan) Berdy Khotdyev		Kelme	
Merw	(Turkmenistan) Jemşit Orazmuhammedow		Jako	Türkmengaz
Şagadam	(Turkmenistan) Ali Gurbani		Kelme	Yug-Neftegaz Private Limited / Turkmenbashi Complex of Oil Refineries

== Coaching changes ==
Team	Outgoing coach	Manner of departure	Date of vacancy	Position in table	Incoming coach	Date of appointment	Ref.
Köpetdag Aşgabat	(Turkmenistan) Tofik Şükürow			Preseason	(Turkmenistan) Berdy Khotdyev		
Nebitçi	(Turkmenistan) Amanmyrat Meredow			Preseason	(Turkmenistan) Aleksandr Klimenko		

== Regular season ==
=== League table ===
Pos	Team	Pld	W	D	L	GF	GA	GD	Pts	Qualification or relegation
1	Arkadag (C)	28	28	0	0	105	15	+90	84	Qualification for AFC Champions League Two Playoffs
2	Ahal	28	17	4	7	54	26	+28	55	Qualification for AFC Challenge League group stage
3	Altyn Asyr	28	16	5	7	54	35	+19	53	Qualification for the Silk Way Cup group stage
4	Şagadam	28	12	7	9	32	32	0	43	Qualification for the Silk Way Cup qualifying round
5	Nebitçi	28	9	6	13	22	41	−19	33	
6	Aşgabat	28	7	3	18	23	54	−31	24	
7	Köpetdag Aşgabat	28	3	5	20	21	72	−51	14	
8	Merw	28	2	6	20	16	52	−36	12	

Source: RSSSF
Rules for classification: 1) Points; 2) Head-to-head points; 3) Head-to-head goal difference; 4) Head-to-head goals scored; 5) Goal difference; 6) Goals scored.
(C) Champions

=== Results ===
Home \ Away	AHA	ALT	ARK	ASG	KOP	MER	NEB	SAG
Ahal		0–1	0–3	4–0	4–0	3–0	2–0	1–1
Ahal		0–0	0–1	1–2	2–0	4–0	2–0	1–0
Altyn Asyr	3–1		0–3	1–0	3–0	2–0	1–0	1–1
Altyn Asyr	3–3		2–5	2–1	5–1	3–2	3–0	0–0
Arkadag	4–1	7–3		7–0	6–1	7–0	3–0	4–0
Arkadag	3–1	2–0		4–0	5–0	4–1	4–1	2–0
Aşgabat	1–4	3–1	0–2		0–0	0–0	2–1	2–3
Aşgabat	1–1	0–5	0–1		1–2	2–1	1–2	0–1
Köpetdag Aşgabat	0–3	1–3	1–3	2–3		0–3	0–0	0–1
Köpetdag Aşgabat	1–4	1–5	0–3	0–1		0–0	3–3	2–1
Merw	1–3	0–1	0–2	2–0	0–1		0–0	1–1
Merw	0–2	0–0	1–3	1–2	2–2		1–2	0–1
Nebitçi	0–1	1–0	0–1	2–0	1–0	3–0		0–0
Nebitçi	0–3	0–3	1–8	1–0	2–1	1–0		0–0
Şagadam	1–2	2–1	1–4	1–0	4–1	1–0	1–0	
Şagadam	0–1	1–2	1–4	2–1	4–1	2–1	1–1	

Source: Soccerway
Legend: Blue = home team win; Yellow = draw; Red = away team win.

=== Results by round ===
Team ╲ Round	1	2	3	4	5	6	7	8	9	10	11	12	13	14	15	16	17	18	19	20	21	22	23	24	25	26	27	28
Arkadag	W	W	W	W	W	W	W	W	W	W	W	W	W	W	W	W	W	W	W	W	W							
Altyn Asyr	W	L	L	W	W	D	W	L	W	L	W	W	W	L	W		L	D			D							
Ahal	W	L	W	L	W	W	W	W	W	W	W	L	D	W	W			D										
Aşgabat	L	L	D	W	W	L	L	W	W	L	L	D	L	L	L		W	W		L								
Köpetdag Aşgabat	L	L	L	L	L	D	L	L	W	L	L	D	L	L	L			L			W							
Merw	L	W	D	L	L	L	L	D	L	W	L	D	L	L	L		L	L			D							
Nebitçi	L	W	D	W	L	D	L	L	L	L	L	D	W	W	L		D	W			L							
Şagadam	W	W	D	L	L	D	W	D	W	W	W	L	D	W	W		D	L			L							

Updated to match(es) played on 20 August 2025. Source: Soccerway
W = Win; D = Draw; L = Loss

== Season statistics ==
=== Top scorers ===
As of matches played 15 December 2025

Rank	Player	Team	Goals
1	(Turkmenistan) Didar Durdyýew	Arkadag	27
2	(Turkmenistan) Begenç Akmämmedow	Arkadag	17
3	(Turkmenistan) Altymyrat Annadurdyýew	Arkadag	16
4	(Turkmenistan) Elman Tagaýew	Ahal	12
5	(Turkmenistan) Myrat Annaýew	Altyn Asyr	11
6	(Turkmenistan) Mekan Ashyrov	Şagadam	10
6	(Turkmenistan) Şamämmet Hydyrow	Arkadag	10
8	(Turkmenistan) Dayanch Meredov	Ahal/Köpetdag	8
9	(Turkmenistan) Zafar Babajanow	Altyn Asyr	7
9	(Turkmenistan) Selim Nurmuradov	Altyn Asyr	7

=== Hat-tricks ===
Player	For	Against	Result	Date	Ref
(Turkmenistan) Abdyresul Abdyev	Merw	Köpetdag	3–0 (A)	11 March 2025	
(Turkmenistan) Meilis Diniev	Ahal	Aşgabat	4–1 (A)	19 April 2025	
(Turkmenistan) Altymyrat Annadurdyýew	Arkadag	Köpetdag	6–1 (H)	23 April 2025	
(Turkmenistan) Welmyrat Ballakow	Arkadag	Aşgabat	7–0 (H)	21 June 2025	
(Turkmenistan) Altymyrat Annadurdyýew	Arkadag	Aşgabat	4–0 (H)	3 August 2025	
(Turkmenistan) Didar Durdyýew^{4}	Arkadag	Köpetdag	5–0 (H)	7 August 2025	
(Turkmenistan) Begenç Akmämmedow	Arkadag	Nebitçi	8–1 (A)	11 August 2025	
(Turkmenistan) Shamamed Khydyrov	Arkadag	Nebitçi	8–1 (A)	11 August 2025	

Notes

- ^{4} Player scored 4 goals

=== Discipline ===
==== Red cards ====
As of match played 11 August 2025

- (Turkmenistan) Şöhrat Söýünow – Altyn Asyr vs Aşgabat (5 March 2025)
- (Turkmenistan) Serdar Guliyev – Nebitçi vs Altyn Asyr (10 March 2025)
- (Turkmenistan) Agadzhan Altiyev – Köpetdag vs Merw (11 March 2025)
- (Turkmenistan) Saparmurat Ovezov – Şagadam vs Ahal (3 April 2025)
- (Turkmenistan) Dovletmukhamed Dzhallatov – Ahal vs Merw (11 April 2025)
- (Turkmenistan) Merdan Durdymukhamedov – Merw vs Altyn Asyr (19 April 2025)
- (Turkmenistan) Murad Ovezmuradov – Merw vs Şagadam (26 April 2025)
- (Turkmenistan) Azizbek Bekchanov – Merw vs Şagadam (26 April 2025)
- (Turkmenistan) Tirkishmurad Sarymuradov – Şagadam vs Aşgabat (3 May 2025)
- (Turkmenistan) Bayramgeldy Gulmayev – Aşgabat vs Köpetdag (17 May 2025)
- (Turkmenistan) Amangeldy Saparov – Merw vs Arkadag (29 May 2025)
- (Turkmenistan) Akhmed Atayev – Merw vs Arkadag (29 May 2025)
- (Turkmenistan) Mukam Nazzyev – Merw vs Ahal (14 June 2025)
- (Turkmenistan) Kemal Annamukhamedov – Merw vs Ahal (14 June 2025)
- (Turkmenistan) Meilis Diniev – Merw vs Ahal (14 June 2025)

== See also ==
- 2025 Turkmenistan Cup
