= 1992 Ýokary Liga =

Football competition

1992 Ýokary Liga season was the 1st edition of the top tier professional Yokary Liga football annual competition in Turkmenistan administered by the Football Federation of Turkmenistan. It started April 25, 1992, and finished November 23, 1992. 15 sides entered the competition.

FK Köpetdag Aşgabat won the Turkmenistan Cup.

== Teams ==
The 1992 Ýokary Liga season was contested by the following clubs:

- Ahal Akdaşaýak
- Arkaç Gyzylarbat
- Arlan Nebitdag
- Bereket Tejen
- Hazar Krasnowodsk
- Jeýhun Seýdi
- Kolhozçy Türkmengala
- Köpetdag Aşgabat
- Lebap Çärjew
- Merw Mary
- Nebitçi Nebitdag
- Sport Büzmeýin
- TSHT Aşgabat
- Zarýa-MALS Daşhowuz
- Umyt Baýramaly

== Results ==
Pos	Team	Pld	W	D	L	GF	GA	GD	Pts	Qualification or relegation
1	Köpetdag Aşgabat	28	27	0	1	151	8	+143	54	Champions
2	Nebitçi Nebitdag	28	22	3	3	96	12	+84	47	
3	Ahal Akdaşaýak	28	22	2	4	103	16	+87	46	Withdrawn (Note: Ahal Akdaşaýak was withdrawn from 1993 Ýokary Liga)
4	Merw Mary	28	18	5	5	67	18	+49	41	
5	Sport Büzmeýin	28	16	5	7	63	55	+8	37	
6	Hazar Krasnowodsk	28	15	5	8	35	31	+4	35	
7	Arlan Nebitdag	28	13	8	7	37	35	+2	34	
8	TSHT Aşgabat	28	16	1	11	69	37	+32	33	
9	Lebap Çärjew	28	9	5	14	30	38	−8	23	
10	Kolhozçy Türkmengala	28	8	3	17	30	62	−32	19	
11	Zarýa-MALS Daşoguz	28	6	2	20	20	70	−50	14	
12	Bereket Tejen	28	5	3	20	22	85	−63	13	Relegation
13	Jeýhun Seýdi	28	5	1	22	20	122	−102	11	Relegation
14	Arkaç Gyzylarbat	28	5	0	23	14	123	−109	10	Relegation
15	Umyt Baýramaly	28	1	1	26	15	64	−49	3	Relegation

Source: RSSSF
Rules for classification: 1) points; 2) goal difference; 3) number of goals scored.
