= 2008 Ýokary Liga =

Ýokary Liga
- Season: 2008
- Champions: FC Aşgabat
- Runner up: HTTU Aşgabat
- Top goalscorer: Berdi Şamyradow, Mämmedaly Garadanow (11 goals)
- Biggest home win: HTTU 10–0 Turan
- Biggest away win: Ahal 0–6 Aşgabat

2008 Ýokary Liga season was the 16th edition of the top tier professional Yokary Liga football annual competition in Turkmenistan administered by the Football Federation of Turkmenistan. It began on 12 April 2008.

- FC Bagtyýarlyk, FC Ahal, Gara Altyn Balkanabat and FC Altyn Asyr were four teams promoted to Turkmenistan's top flight.
- Conspicuous by their absence was Köpetdag Aşgabat, the six-time Turkmenistan champions and 1997/98 AFC Asian Cup Winners' Cup semi-finalists who have had to disband due to financial reasons.
- in July, Lebap (Türkmenabat) were renamed Bagtyýarlyk;

== Premier League Teams (2008) ==
Location of teams in the Turkmenistan League 2008

Club	City	2007 season
FC Ahal	Ahal Province	—
FC Altyn Asyr	Ashgabat	—
FC Aşgabat	Ashgabat	Champions
Gara Altyn Balkanabat	Balkanabat	—
HTTU Aşgabat	Ashgabat	2nd
FC Bagtyýarlyk	Türkmenabat	—
Merw Mary	Mary	6th
Nebitçi Balkanabat	Balkanabat	3rd
Şagadam Türkmenbaşy	Turkmenbaşy	5th
Talyp Sporty Aşgabat	Ashgabat	4th
Turan Daşoguz	Daşoguz	7th

== Final League standings ==
Pos	Team	Pld	W	D	L	GF	GA	GD	Pts
1	FC Aşgabat (C)	20	16	4	0	48	4	+44	52
2	HTTU Aşgabat	20	14	5	1	55	9	+46	47
3	Nebitçi Balkanabat	20	14	2	4	42	16	+26	44
4	Merw Mary	20	10	5	5	31	22	+9	35
5	Talyp Sporty Aşgabat	20	7	8	5	21	10	+11	29
6	Şagadam Türkmenbaşy	20	7	6	7	20	19	+1	27
7	Turan Daşoguz	20	7	4	9	18	40	−22	25
8	FC Altyn Asyr	20	7	2	11	21	20	+1	23
9	Gara Altyn Balkanabat	20	6	2	12	27	34	−7	20
10	FC Ahal	20	1	1	18	12	68	−56	4
11	FC Bagtyýarlyk	20	1	1	18	7	60	−53	4

(C) Champions

== Top goalscorers ==
Pos.	Scorer	Goals	Club
1.	(Turkmenistan) Berdi Şamyradow	11	HTTU Aşgabat
1.	(Turkmenistan) Mämmedaly Garadanow	11	HTTU Aşgabat
