= 2002 Ýokary Liga =

2002 Ýokary Liga season was the 10th edition of the top tier professional Yokary Liga football annual competition in Turkmenistan administered by the Football Federation of Turkmenistan. Nine teams contested.

== Results ==
Pos	Team	Pld	W	D	L	GF	GA	GD	Pts
1	Şagadam Türkmenbaşy	32	21	4	7	65	29	+36	67
2	Nisa Aşgabat	32	18	9	5	79	21	+58	63
3	Garagum Turkmenabat	32	17	8	7	46	31	+15	59
4	Köpetdag Aşgabat	32	16	7	9	45	35	+10	55
5	Nebitçi Balkanabat	32	16	5	11	61	39	+22	53
6	Merw Mary	32	9	10	13	36	54	−18	37
7	Turan Daşoguz	32	7	8	17	30	52	−22	29
8	Galkan Aşgabat	32	7	6	19	27	49	−22	27
9	Ahal Akdaşaýak (R)	32	2	3	27	17	102	−85	9

Source: rsssf.com
(R) Relegated
