= 1994 Ýokary Liga =

Football competition

1994 Ýokary Liga season was the 3rd edition of the top tier professional Yokary Liga football annual competition in Turkmenistan administered by the Football Federation of Turkmenistan.

== Final league table ==
Pos	Team	Pld	W	D	L	GF	GA	GD	Pts
1	Köpetdag Aşgabat	18	15	1	2	56	11	+45	31
2	Nisa Aşgabat	18	12	0	6	42	25	+17	24
3	Merw Mary	18	7	6	5	22	18	+4	20
4	Babadayhan Babadayhansky Etrap	18	8	3	7	21	17	+4	19
5	Hlopkovik Çärjew	18	8	2	8	14	25	−11	18
6	Büzmeýin	18	6	5	7	21	23	−2	17
7	Nebitçi Nebitdag	18	7	2	9	24	31	−7	16
8	Turan Daşoguz	18	7	2	9	21	30	−9	16
9	Şagadam Türkmenbaşy	18	7	1	10	15	24	−9	15
10	Lebap Çärjew	18	1	2	15	8	40	−32	4
