= 2005 Ýokary Liga =

Thirteenth season of the Turkmenistan football league

Ýokary Liga
- Season: 2005
- Champions: HTTU Aşgabat
- Runner up: Nebitçi Balkanabat
- Top goalscorer: Berdi Şamyradow (30)

2005 Ýokary Liga season was the 13th edition of the top tier professional Yokary Liga football annual competition in Turkmenistan administered by the Football Federation of Turkmenistan. Nine teams contested.

== Results ==
Pos	Team	Pld	W	D	L	GF	GA	GD	Pts
1	HTTU Aşgabat	32	22	6	4	77	20	+57	72
2	Gazçy Gazojak	32	18	8	6	54	18	+36	62
3	Nebitçi Balkanabat	32	17	7	8	48	29	+19	58
4	Nisa Aşgabat	32	10	11	11	31	38	−7	41
5	Merw Mary	32	10	9	13	28	38	−10	39
6	Şagadam Türkmenbaşy	32	10	6	16	33	49	−16	36
7	Turan Daşoguz	32	9	8	15	33	50	−17	35
8	Köpetdag Aşgabat	32	7	9	16	29	56	−27	30
9	Ahal Annau	32	6	6	20	37	72	−35	24
