= 2003 Ýokary Liga =

2003 Ýokary Liga season was the 11th edition of the top tier professional Yokary Liga football annual competition in Turkmenistan administered by the Football Federation of Turkmenistan. Ten teams contested.

== Results ==
Pos	Team	Pld	W	D	L	GF	GA	GD	Pts
1	Nisa Aşgabat	36	29	5	2	102	12	+90	92
2	Nebitçi Balkanabat	36	23	10	3	100	23	+77	79
3	Şagadam Türkmenbaşy	36	23	7	6	67	28	+39	76
4	Asudalyk Aşgabat	36	19	6	11	62	44	+18	63
5	Merw Mary	36	17	2	17	56	65	−9	53
6	Köpetdag Aşgabat	36	13	10	13	57	39	+18	49
7	Gazchi Gaz-Achak	36	13	2	21	47	72	−25	41
8	Turan Daşoguz	36	10	3	23	40	85	−45	33
9	Ahal Akdaşaýak	36	7	1	28	25	96	−71	22
10	Garagum Turkmenabat	36	2	2	32	11	103	−92	8

Source: rsssf.com
