= 2000 Ýokary Liga =

2000 Ýokary Liga season was the 8th edition of the top tier professional Yokary Liga football annual competition in Turkmenistan administered by the Football Federation of Turkmenistan. Eleven teams contested.

== Results ==
Pos	Team	Pld	W	D	L	GF	GA	GD	Pts
1	Köpetdag Aşgabat	20	18	2	0	83	3	+80	56
2	Nebitçi Balkanabat	20	13	2	5	42	21	+21	41
3	Nisa Aşgabat	20	11	4	5	47	21	+26	37
4	Turan Daşoguz	20	10	4	6	23	26	−3	34
5	Ahal Akdaşaýak	20	8	5	7	22	24	−2	29
6	SMM+ Karatamak	20	7	6	7	25	22	+3	27
7	Galkan Aşgabat	20	5	6	9	11	26	−15	21
8	Dagdan Aşgabat	20	5	6	9	21	39	−18	21
9	Merw Mary	20	4	6	10	16	46	−30	18
10	Şagadam Türkmenbaşy	20	4	4	12	17	38	−21	16
11	Jeykhun Turkmenabat	20	2	1	17	10	51	−41	7

Source: rsssf.com
