= 1996 Ýokary Liga =

Football competition

1996 Ýokary Liga season was the 5thedition of the top tier professional Yokary Liga football annual competition in Turkmenistan administered by the Football Federation of Turkmenistan. Eight teams contested. The championship was uncompleted and Nisa Ashkhabad was proclaimed champion.

== Results ==
Pos	Team	Pld	W	D	L	GF	GA	GD	Pts
1	Nisa Aşgabat	32	26	5	1	95	21	+74	83
2	Köpetdag Aşgabat	31	23	5	3	76	12	+64	74
3	Ekskawatorçy Çärjew	33	19	3	11	40	33	+7	60
4	Merw Mary	32	16	4	12	61	34	+27	52
5	Turan Daşoguz	29	15	7	7	43	33	+10	52
6	Nebitçi Nebit-Dag	32	13	6	13	39	43	−4	45
7	Pakhtachi Çärjew	32	10	3	19	35	72	−37	33
8	Büzmeýin	33	9	6	18	28	52	−24	33

Source: rsssf.com
