= 2007 Ýokary Liga =

Football competition

Ýokary Liga
- Season: 2007
- Champions: FC Aşgabat
- Runner up: HTTU Aşgabat
- Top goalscorer: Berdi Şamyradow (16)

2007 Ýokary Liga season was the 15th edition of the top tier professional Yokary Liga football annual competition in Turkmenistan administered by the Football Federation of Turkmenistan. Eight teams contested.

== Final table ==
Pos	Team	Pld	W	D	L	GF	GA	GD	Pts
1	FC Aşgabat	28	19	4	5	44	14	+30	61
2	HTTU Aşgabat	28	16	8	4	66	25	+41	56
3	Nebitçi Balkanabat	28	14	4	10	43	33	+10	46
4	Talyp Sporty Aşgabat	28	12	5	11	41	38	+3	41
5	Şagadam Türkmenbaşy	28	10	6	12	31	32	−1	36
6	Merw Mary	28	10	5	13	40	37	+3	35
7	Turan Daşoguz	28	7	3	18	23	56	−33	24
8	Köpetdag Aşgabat	28	5	3	20	21	74	−53	18
