= 2006 Ýokary Liga =

Ýokary Liga
- Season: 2006
- Champions: HTTU Aşgabat
- Runner up: Nebitçi Balkanabat
- Top goalscorer: Hamza Allamow (22)

2006 Ýokary Liga season was the 14th edition of the top tier professional Yokary Liga football annual competition in Turkmenistan administered by the Football Federation of Turkmenistan. Eight teams competed.

== Final table ==
Pos	Team	Pld	W	D	L	GF	GA	GD	Pts
1	HTTU Aşgabat (C)	28	16	7	5	56	30	+26	55
2	Nebitçi Balkanabat	28	15	6	7	38	19	+19	51
3	FC Aşgabat	28	14	6	8	40	24	+16	48
4	Şagadam Türkmenbaşy	28	12	5	11	39	39	0	41
5	Köpetdag Aşgabat	28	10	9	9	39	38	+1	39
6	Turan Daşoguz	28	9	6	13	33	44	−11	33
7	Merw Mary	28	7	4	17	22	51	−29	25
8	Nisa Aşgabat (R)	28	4	7	17	22	44	−22	19

(C) Champions; (R) Relegated
