= 1995 Ýokary Liga =

Football competition

1995 Ýokary Liga season was the fourth edition of the top tier professional Yokary Liga football annual competition in Turkmenistan administered by the Football Federation of Turkmenistan. Köpetdag Aşgabat finished the season as champions.

== Results ==
=== Second stage ===
Pos	Team	Pld	W	D	L	GF	GA	GD	Pts
1	Köpetdag Aşgabat	32	27	3	2	116	15	+101	84
2	Nisa Aşgabat	32	25	4	3	106	31	+75	79
3	Nebitçi Nebit-Dag	32	19	4	9	87	44	+43	61
4	Turan Daşoguz	32	17	5	10	49	32	+17	56
5	Merw Mary	32	14	5	13	50	51	−1	47
6	Büzmeýin	32	12	4	16	38	45	−7	40

Source: RSSSF
