= 1997–98 Ýokary Liga =

Football competition

1997–98 Ýokary Liga season was the 6th edition of the top tier professional Yokary Liga football annual competition in Turkmenistan administered by the Football Federation of Turkmenistan. Eight teams contested.

Köpetdag Aşgabat won the championship with 4 matches to spare, having a 16-point lead over Nisa Aşgabat.

== Results ==
Note: The final results are unavailable for this season; the table below may be missing data.

Pos	Team	Pld	W	D	L	GF	GA	GD	Pts
1	Köpetdag Aşgabat	28	24	3	1	105	20	+85	75
2	Dagdan Aşgabat	28	21	1	6	63	24	+39	64
3	Nisa Aşgabat	28	18	6	4	77	17	+60	60
4	Nebitçi Nebit-Dag	28	13	2	13	43	38	+5	41
5	Jeykhun Çärjew	28	9	2	17	26	64	−38	29
6	Büzmeýin	28	7	5	16	29	52	−23	26
7	Merw Mary	28	7	3	18	33	64	−31	24
8	Şagadam Krasnovodsk	27	1	2	24	10	97	−87	5

Source: rsssf.com
