= Murat Ýakşiýew =

Turkmen footballer (born 1992)

Personal information
- Full name: Murat Tohtamuradowiç Ýakşiýew
- Date of birth: 12 January 1992 (age 34)
- Place of birth: Turkmenabat, Lebap Region, Turkmenistan
- Height: 1.78 m (5 ft 10 in)
- Position: Striker

Team information
- Current team: FC Neftchi Kochkor-Ata
- Number: 11

Senior career*
Years	Team	Apps	(Gls)
2012–2013	FC Bagtyyarlyk-Lebap	?	(14)
2014	FC Daşoguz	?	(2)
2014–2015	FC Balkan	?	(40)
2016–2019	Altyn Asyr	?	(28)
2020	Ahal	25	(11)
2021	Şagadam	0	(0)
2021–2023	Altyn Asyr	0	(0)
2023	FC Neftchi Kochkor-Ata	9	(1)
2023	Merw	?	(?)
2024	Köpetdag	?	(2)
2024–	Nebitçi	?	(2)

International career^{‡}
2017–2019	Turkmenistan	12	(2)
- * Club domestic league appearances and goals as of May 19, 2023 ‡ National team caps and goals as of May 19, 2023

Murat Yakshiyev (Turkmen: Murat Ýakşiýew; Russian: Мурад Якшиев; born 12 January 1992) is a professional Turkmen football player who played in Şagadam. He is also a member of Turkmenistan national football team.

== Club career ==
He was born in Turkmenabat, Turkmenistan, and started his career in football team FC Bagtyyarlyk-Lebap in Turkmenabat.

In 2014, he moved to the professional football by signing a contract with the Turan FK. However, in the third round of the Ýokary Liga he moved to Balkan FK. Speaking for the Balkan FK in the 2015 season became the top scorer of the Ýokary Liga (31 goals), as well as the silver medalist of the championship.

Since 2016 plays for FC Altyn Asyr. He made his debut for the new club in the framework of the 2016 AFC Cup against the Lebanese club Al-Ahed (2:0). As part of FC Altyn Asyr, he became the champion of the Turkmenistan for four consecutive seasons.

In January 2020, he joined the Ýokary Liga vice-champion FC Ahal.

=== FC Neftchi Kochkor-Ata ===
In March 2023, Kyrgyz professional football club Neftchi announced the signing of Yakshiyev to a one-year contract. On 16 May 2023, Yakshiyev scored his first goal for FC Neftchi in a game against FC Aldiyer Kurshab (3:2).

== International career ==
Ýagşyýew made his senior national team debut on 26 March 2017 against Chinese Taipei, coming to the substitution at the 72nd minute.

=== International goals ===
Scores and results list Turkmenistan's goal tally first.

No	Date	Venue	Opponent	Score	Result	Competition
1.	13 June 2017	Sport toplumy, Daşoguz, Turkmenistan	Bahrain	1–2	1–2	2019 AFC Asian Cup qualification
2.	14 November 2017	Sport toplumy, Balkanabat, Turkmenistan	Chinese Taipei	1–0	2–1	2019 AFC Asian Cup qualification
