= 2012 Turkmenistan Cup =

Tournament details
- Country: Turkmenistan

Final positions
- Champions: FC Balkan
- Runners-up: HTTU Aşgabat

The 2012 Turkmenistan Cup is 20th since independence of the Turkmen national football cup.

== Round 1 ==
The Round 1 involves 16 teams. Games played on 13 and 16 November 2012.

Team 1	Agg.	Team 2	1st leg	2nd leg
FC Balkan	–	FC Nebitçi 2	–	–
FC Lebap	–	FC Bezirgen	–	–
FC Şagadam	–	FC Sarydaş	–	–
FC Aşgabat	–	FC Talyp Sporty	–	–
HTTU Aşgabat	–	FC Ahal	–	–
FC Daşoguz	–	FC Gallaçy	–	–
FC Altyn Asyr	–	FC Hazyna	–	–
FC Merw	–	FC Goňur	–	5 – 2

== Quarterfinals ==
The quarterfinals involve 8 teams. Games played on 19 and 22 November 2012.

Team 1	Agg.	Team 2	1st leg	2nd leg
FC Balkan	–	FC Bezirgen	–	–
FC Şagadam	–	FC Talyp Sporty	3 – 1	–
HTTU Aşgabat	–	FC Gallaçy	–	–
FC Altyn Asyr	–	FC Merw	1 – 1	–

== Semifinals ==
The semifinals involve 4 teams. Games will be played on 26 and 29 November 2012.

Team 1	Agg.	Team 2	1st leg	2nd leg
HTTU Aşgabat	0 – 0 (4–3 p)	FC Merw	0 – 0	0 – 0
FC Balkan	4 – 1	FC Şagadam	1 – 1	3 – 0

== Final ==
Game will be played on 5 December 2012.

8 December 2012

HTTU Aşgabat	1 – 2	FC Balkan

Ashgabat Stadium

== See also ==
- 2012 Ýokary Liga
