= 2001 Ýokary Liga =

2001 Ýokary Liga season was the 9th edition of the top tier professional Yokary Liga football annual competition in Turkmenistan administered by the Football Federation of Turkmenistan. Nine teams contested.

== Results ==
Pos	Team	Pld	W	D	L	GF	GA	GD	Pts
1	Nisa Aşgabat	32	25	2	5	98	32	+66	77
2	Köpetdag Aşgabat	32	21	5	6	97	23	+74	68
3	Nebitçi Balkanabat	32	18	6	8	58	37	+21	60
4	Galkan Aşgabat	32	17	6	9	41	29	+12	57
5	Şagadam Türkmenbaşy	32	14	8	10	39	29	+10	50
6	Merw Mary	32	10	3	19	41	76	−35	33
7	Turan Daşoguz	32	9	5	18	30	55	−25	32
8	Ahal Akdaşaýak	32	5	3	24	31	93	−62	18
9	Jeykhun Türkmenabat	32	5	2	25	24	85	−61	17
