= 1998–99 Ýokary Liga =

Professional football league

1998–99 Ýokary Liga season was the 7th edition of the top tier professional Yokary Liga football annual competition in Turkmenistan administered by the Football Federation of Turkmenistan. Nine teams contested.

== Results ==
| Pos | Team | Pld | W | D | L | GF | GA | GD | Pts |
|---|---|---|---|---|---|---|---|---|---|
| 1 | Nisa Aşgabat | 32 | 25 | 3 | 4 | 94 | 22 | +72 | 78 |
| 2 | Köpetdag Aşgabat | 32 | 21 | 4 | 7 | 71 | 32 | +39 | 67 |
| 3 | Dagdan Aşgabat | 32 | 17 | 9 | 6 | 65 | 33 | +32 | 60 |
| 4 | Nebitçi Nebit-Dag | 32 | 18 | 5 | 9 | 63 | 45 | +18 | 59 |
| 5 | Turan Daşoguz | 32 | 10 | 7 | 15 | 41 | 48 | −7 | 37 |
| 6 | Jeykhun Çärjew | 32 | 10 | 5 | 17 | 42 | 51 | −9 | 35 |
| 7 | Merw Mary | 32 | 10 | 5 | 17 | 34 | 51 | −17 | 35 |
| 8 | Ahal Akdaşaýak | 32 | 5 | 4 | 23 | 14 | 74 | −60 | 19 |
| 9 | Şagadam Krasnovodsk | 32 | 5 | 4 | 23 | 25 | 93 | −68 | 19 |

Source: rsssf.com
