= Semih Yuvakuran =

Turkish footballer (born 1963)

Personal information
- Date of birth: 1 September 1963 (age 63)
- Place of birth: Bursa, Turkey
- Position: Left-back

Youth career
- Bursaspor

Senior career*
Years	Team	Apps	(Gls)
1981–1984	Bursaspor	44	(0)
1984–1990	Galatasaray	166	(4)
1990–1996	Fenerbahçe	89	(1)
1995–1996	→ Edirnespor (loan)	12	(0)
Total		311	(5)

International career
1984–1985	Turkey U21	4	(0)
1984–1990	Turkey	21	(0)

Managerial career
- 2005: Gebzespor
- 2011: Denizlispor (assistant manager)
- 2012: Balkan FK
- 2013–2014: Sancaktepe
- 2015–2016: Düzcespor
- * Club domestic league appearances and goals

Semih Yuvakuran (born 1 September 1963) is a Turkish football manager and former player. He played as a left-back for Galatasaray and Fenerbahçe in the Süper Lig.

== Club career ==
A youth product of Bursaspor, Semih begun his career as a striker, moving to left wing, and eventually broke through professionally as a leftback in defense. Semih transferred to Galatasaray in 1984 and helped them win two Süper Ligs, one Turkish Cup, one Chancellor Cup, two Turkish Super Cups, and one TSYD Cup. He eventually transferred to their rivals Fenerbahçe, and could not replicate their success.

== Managerial career ==
Semih had a couple stints with lower division Turkish teams. In 2012, he managed the Turkmen club Balkan FK and helped them win the domestic double, winning the Ýokary Liga and Turkmenistan Cup.

== Personal life ==
Semih is the father of triplet sons. All three of his sons are footballers, and one of them, Utku Yuvakuran, is a professional footballer for Beşiktaş J.K.

== Honours ==
=== Player ===
Galatasaray

- Süper Lig: 1986–1987, 1987–1988
- Turkish Cup: 1984–1985
- Chancellor Cup: 1985–1986
- Turkish Super Cup: 1986–1987, 1987–1988
- TSYD Cup: 1987–1988

Fenerbahçe

- Chancellor Cup: 1992–1993
- TSYD Cup: 1994–1995

=== Manager ===
Balkan FK

- Ýokary Liga: 2012 Ýokary Liga
- Turkmenistan Cup: 2012 Turkmenistan Cup
