= 1993 Ýokary Liga =

Football competition

1993 Ýokary Liga season was the 2nd edition of the top tier professional Yokary Liga football annual competition in Turkmenistan administered by the Football Federation of Turkmenistan. It started on March 27, 1993, and ended on October 3, 1993.

== Teams ==
The 1993 Ýokary Liga season was contested by the following clubs:

- Nebitçi Balkanabat
- Büzmeýin
- Turan Daşoguz
- Hazar Türkmenbaşy
- Kolhozçy Türkmengala
- Köpetdag Aşgabat
- Lebap Çärjew
- Merw Mary
- Balkan Nebitdag
- TSHT Aşgabat

== Club name changes ==
At season start:

- Sport Büzmeýin became Büzmeýin
- Zarýa-MALS Daşoguz became Turan Daşoguz
- Hazar Krasnowodsk became Hazar Türkmenbaşy
- Arlan Nebitdag became Şazada Nebitdag
- Şazada Nebitdag became Balkan Nebitdag

== First round ==
=== League table ===
Pos	Team	Pld	W	D	L	GF	GA	GD	Pts	Qualification
1	Köpetdag Aşgabat	18	13	3	2	75	8	+67	29	Qualification for Championship round
2	Büzmeýin	18	12	4	2	27	14	+13	28	Qualification for Championship round
3	Nebitçi Balkanabat	18	12	3	3	54	13	+41	27	Qualification for Championship round
4	Merw Mary	18	9	4	5	31	19	+12	22	Qualification for Championship round
5	Turan Daşoguz	18	9	4	5	30	24	+6	22	Qualification for Championship round
6	Balkan Nebitdag	18	7	2	9	23	30	−7	16	Qualification for Relegation round
7	Hazar Türkmenbaşy	18	6	4	8	19	27	−8	16	Qualification for Relegation round
8	Lebap Çärjew	18	6	4	8	19	28	−9	16	Qualification for Relegation round
9	Kolhozçy Türkmengala	18	2	0	16	13	58	−45	4	Qualification for Relegation round
10	TSHT Aşgabat	18	0	0	18	8	78	−70	0	Qualification for Relegation round

Source: RSSSF (in English)
Rules for classification: 1) points; 2) goal difference; 3) number of goals scored.

== Second round ==
=== Championship round ===
Pos	Team	Pld	W	D	L	GF	GA	GD	Pts
1	Köpetdag Aşgabat	8	6	2	0	21	4	+17	14
2	Büzmeýin	8	5	1	2	12	9	+3	11
3	Nebitçi Balkanabat	8	3	3	2	5	6	−1	9
4	Merw Mary	8	2	1	5	8	13	−5	5
5	Turan Daşoguz	8	0	1	7	3	17	−14	1

Source: RSSSF (in English)
Rules for classification: 1) points; 2) goal difference; 3) number of goals scored.

=== Relegation round ===
Pos	Team	Pld	W	D	L	GF	GA	GD	Pts	Relegation
6	Balkan Nebitdag	8	7	0	1	17	5	+12	14	Relegation to 1st Division
7	Hazar Türkmenbaşy	8	6	0	2	16	5	+11	12	Relegation to 1st Division
8	Lebap Çärjew	8	3	0	5	12	9	+3	6	Remained in Premier Division
9	Kolhozçy Türkmengala	8	3	0	5	4	15	−11	6	Relegation to 1st Division
10	TSHT Aşgabat	8	1	0	7	8	23	−15	2	Relegation to 1st Division

Source: RSSSF (in English)
Rules for classification: 1) points; 2) goal difference; 3) number of goals scored.
