= Umidjan Astanow =

Turkmenistan footballer (born 1990)

Personal information
- Full name: Umidjan Babamuradowiç Astanow
- Date of birth: 11 August 1990 (age 36)
- Place of birth: Türkmenabat, Turkmenistan
- Height: 1.75 m (5 ft 9 in)
- Position: Midfielder

Team information
- Current team: Nebitçi
- Number: 26

Senior career*
Years	Team	Apps	(Gls)
2012	Merw Mary	?	(?)
2013–2014	FC Balkan	?	(?)
2015–2018	FC Altyn Asyr		
2019	FC Merw		
2020	FC Energetik	3	(0)
2020–	Nebitçi	0	(0)

International career^{‡}
2012–2017	Turkmenistan	16	(0)
- * Club domestic league appearances and goals as of 29 August 2020 ‡ National team caps and goals as of 29 August 2020

Umidjan Babamuradowiç Astanow (born 11 August 1990) is a Turkmen footballer currently playing for Nebitçi FT in the Ýokary Liga as a midfielder. Former player of the Turkmenistan national football team.

== Club career ==
He began his career in the football club FC Merw. Since 2013, he has played for FC Balkan and won the AFC President's Cup 2013 in Malaysia with them. In 2015, he moved to FC Altyn Asyr.

In 2019, Astanow joined FC Merw.

Umidjan Astanow joined Energetik FK in January 2020. After unsuccessful trials at Energetik FK, Astanow signed a contract with Nebitçi FT in August 2020.

== International career ==
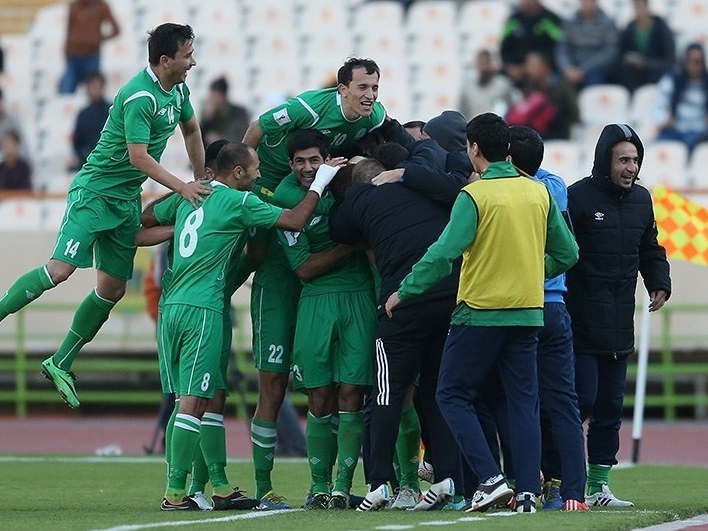
№14 Astanow with Turkmenistan football team 2015 year

He played for the Olympic team of Turkmenistan at the Asian Games 2010 in Guangzhou. Umidjan was also called up for the Olympic team of Turkmenistan that competed in the London 2012 Olympics.

Astanow made his senior national team debut in the 2012 AFC Challenge Cup. The last time he played for the senior team was in 2017.

== Honors ==
Turkmenistan

- AFC Challenge Cup runner-up: 2012

Balkan

- AFC President's Cup: 2013
