= 2004 Ýokary Liga =

2004 Ýokary Liga season was the 12th Edition of the top tier professional Yokary Liga football annual competition in Turkmenistan administered by the Football Federation of Turkmenistan. Ten teams contested.

== Results ==
| Pos | Team | Pld | W | D | L | GF | GA | GD | Pts |
|---|---|---|---|---|---|---|---|---|---|
| 1 | Nebitçi Balkanabat | 36 | 27 | 3 | 6 | 78 | 23 | +55 | 84 |
| 2 | Nisa Aşgabat | 36 | 24 | 6 | 6 | 84 | 29 | +55 | 78 |
| 3 | Merw Mary | 36 | 20 | 7 | 9 | 55 | 38 | +17 | 67 |
| 4 | Şagadam Türkmenbaşy | 36 | 19 | 10 | 7 | 70 | 34 | +36 | 67 |
| 5 | ITTU Aşgabat | 36 | 16 | 4 | 16 | 67 | 64 | +3 | 52 |
| 6 | Asudalyk Aşgabat | 36 | 15 | 5 | 16 | 38 | 40 | −2 | 50 |
| 7 | Ahal Annau | 36 | 11 | 5 | 20 | 24 | 64 | −40 | 38 |
| 8 | Köpetdag Aşgabat | 36 | 9 | 4 | 23 | 41 | 68 | −27 | 31 |
| 9 | Turan Daşoguz | 36 | 5 | 10 | 21 | 22 | 61 | −39 | 25 |
| 10 | Gazcy Gaz-Acak | 36 | 4 | 6 | 26 | 34 | 92 | −58 | 18 |

Source: rsssf.com
