= Astanov =

Astanov or Astanow (masculine, Russian: Астанов) and Astanova or Astanowa (feminine, Russian: Астанова) is the surname of the following people:

- Lola Astanova (born 1982), Russian-American pianist
- Umidjan Astanow (born 1990), Turkmenistan football player
