= Aleksandr Klimenko (footballer) =

Turkmen association footballer

Personal information
- Full name: Aleksandr Ýewgenýewiç Klimenko
- Date of birth: 13 May 1968 (age 58)
- Place of birth: Aşgabat, Turkmen SSR, Soviet Union
- Position: Goalkeeper

Team information
- Current team: Nebitçi FT (manager)

Senior career*
Years	Team	Apps	(Gls)
1993–1994	Merw		
1995–1998	Nisa		
1998	Kopetdag		
1998–2000	Nisa		
2001–2005	Şagadam		
2006	Ashgabat		

Managerial career
- 2007: Ashgabat
- 2011–2012: Balkan
- 2014: Turkmenistan
- 2015: Energetik
- 2016: Balkan
- 2017–2023: Şagadam FK
- 2025–: Nebitçi FT
- * Club domestic league appearances and goals

Aleksandr Yevgenyevich Klimenko (Александр Евгеньевич Клименко; born 13 May 1968) is a Turkmen former professional footballer and who is currently the football manager of the Nebitçi FT. Honoured Coach of Turkmenistan.

== Career ==
Aleksandr Klimenko spent his entire professional career in Turkmenistan, where he played for FC Merw, FC Nisa, Şagadam FK and Nisa Aşgabat. He ended his football career in 2006.

== Coaching career ==
In 2007, he was an assistant coach at the FC Ashgabat.

In 2011–2012, he was a coach of the Nebitçi FT.

In 2014, he worked as an assistant coach in the Turkmenistan national football team, in June he was relieved of his post.

In 2015, he worked as an assistant to head coach Rahym Kurbanmämmedow at the FC Energetik.

Since 2016 he is the head coach of the Nebitçi FT.

In January 2025, he was appointed as the manager of the Ýokary Liga club Nebitçi FT.
