= Ýokary Liga =

Turkmenistan Higher League
- Organising body: Turkmenistan Football Federation
- Founded: 1992; 34 years ago
- Country: Turkmenistan
- Confederation: AFC
- Number of clubs: 8
- Level on pyramid: 1
- Relegation to: Turkmenistan First League
- Domestic cup(s): Turkmenistan Cup; Turkmenistan Super Cup
- International cup(s): AFC Champions League Two; AFC Challenge League
- Current champions: Arkadag (4th title) (2026)
- Most championships: Altyn Asyr (8 titles)
- Top scorer: Didar Durdyýew (184 goals)
- Broadcaster: Turkmenistan Sport
- Website: tff.com
- Current: 2026 Ýokary Liga

The Turkmenistan Higher League, also called Türkmenistan Ýokary Liga (Turkmen: Ýokary liga futbol klublarynyň arasyndaky futbol boýunça Türkmenistanyň çempionaty), is the top division of professional football in Turkmenistan, operated by the Turkmenistan Football Federation.

Eight clubs participate in the competition which runs between April and November. As of the 2026 season, the winners receive a spot in the AFC Champions League Two preliminary stage.

Since the introduction of the Turkmenistan Higher League in 1992, Altyn Asyr (8 times), Köpetdag (6 times), Nebitçi (4 times), Nisa (4 times), Ýedigen (4 times), Arkadag (3 times), Aşgabat (2 times), Ahal (1 time) and Şagadam (1 time) have won the title.

FC Arkadag are the current champions (2025) (for the third time).

== History ==
After the dissolution of the Soviet Union, starting in 1992, each former Soviet republic organized an independent national championship.

FC Kopetdag won the first four titles. Nisa Aşgabat was the only team which managed to break Kopetdag's dominance, winning the top division title in 1996.

In 2022, FC Ahal won the title for the first time in their history in Turkmenistan professional football.

== Competition ==
The league traditionally runs from April to November.

As of the 2026 season, the champions qualify for the AFC Champions League Two preliminary stage. If the league champions also win the Turkmenistan Cup, then the second-place team qualifies to AFC Challenge League group stage.

== Current clubs ==
Location of teams in the 2024 Ýokary Liga

A total of 8 teams will contest the league. The following teams are competing in the 2025 season:

Club	Location	Stadium	Capacity	Coach	Kit sponsor
Ahal	Änew	Ashgabat Stadium (Auxiliary field)	500	(Turkmenistan) Hojaahmet Arazow	Nike
Altyn Asyr	Ashgabat	Büzmeýin Sport Complex	10,000	(Turkmenistan) Ýazguly Hojageldiýew	Puma
Arkadag	Arkadag	Nusaý Stadium	5,000	(Turkmenistan) Guwançmuhammet Öwekow	
Aşgabat	Ashgabat	Ashgabat Stadium (Auxiliary field)	500	(Turkmenistan) Said Seýidow	Adidas
Köpetdag Aşgabat	Ashgabat	Köpetdag Stadium	26,000	(Turkmenistan) Tofik Şükürow	Kappa
Merw	Mary	Mary Sport Complex	10,000	(Turkmenistan) Magtymguly Begenjew	Nike
Nebitçi	Balkanabat	Balkanabat Sport Complex	10,000	(Turkmenistan) Amanmyrat Meredow	Jako
Şagadam	Türkmenbaşy	Şagadam Stadium	5,000	(Turkmenistan) Aleksandr Klimenko	Nike

== Soviet era champions ==
- 1937: Lokomotiv Ashkhabad
- 1938: Dinamo Ashkhabad
- 1939–45: no championship
- 1946: Dinamo Ashkhabad
- 1947: Spartak Ashkhabad
- 1948: Dinamo Ashkhabad
- 1949: Lokomotiv Ashkhabad
- 1950: Spartak Ashkhabad
- 1951: DOSA Ashkhabad
- 1952: DOSA Ashkhabad
- 1953: Dinamo Ashkhabad
- 1954: Lokomotiv Mary
- 1955: Sbornaya Ashkhabada
- 1956: Krasny Metallist Ashkhabad
- 1957: Sbornaya Ashkhabadskoy Oblasti
- 1958: Sbornaya Ashkhabada
- 1959: Sbornaya Nebit-Daga
- 1960: Sbornaya Chardzhou
- 1961: Energetik Nebit-Dag
- 1962: Energetik Nebit-Dag
- 1963: Stroitel' Mary
- 1964: Pogranichnik Ashkhabad
- 1965: Pogranichnik Ashkhabad
- 1966: Pogranichnik Ashkhabad
- 1967: Pogranichnik Ashkhabad
- 1968: Pogranichnik Ashkhabad
- 1969: Pogranichnik Ashkhabad
- 1970: Karakum Mary
- 1971: Mayak Chardzhou
- 1972: Energostroitel' Mary
- 1973: Tsementnik Bezmein
- 1974: Avtomobilist Ashkhabad
- 1975: Neftyanik Kvasnovodsk
- 1976: Energetik Mary
- 1977: Shatlyk Mary
- 1978: Neftyanik Kvasnovodsk
- 1979: Neftyanik Kvasnovodsk
- 1980: Neftyanik Kvasnovodsk
- 1981: Stroitel' Nebit-Dag
- 1982: Lokomotiv Ashkhabad
- 1983: Sel'khoztekhnika Chardzhou
- 1984: Neftyanik Kvasnovodsk
- 1985: Lokomotiv Ashkhabad
- 1986: Neftyanik Kvasnovodsk
- 1987: SKIF Ashkhabad
- 1988: Akhal Ashkhabadsky Rayon
- 1989: Medik Nebit-Dag
- 1990: Avtomobilist Ashkhabad
- 1991: Sel'khoztekhnika Ashkhabad

Club	Trophies	Years won
Pogranichnik Ashkhabad	6	1964, 1965, 1966, 1967, 1968, 1969
Şagadam	6	1975, 1978, 1979, 1980, 1984, 1986
Dinamo Ashkhabad	4	1938, 1946, 1948, 1953
Lokomotiv Ashkhabad	3	1937, 1982, 1985
Köpetdag Aşgabat	2	1949, 1950
DOSA Ashkhabad	2	1951, 1952
Sbornaya Ashkhabada	2	1955, 1958
Energetik Nebit-Dag	2	1961, 1962
Merw	2	1954, 1970
Avtomobilist Ashkhabad	2	1974, 1990
Spartak Ashkhabad	1	1947
Krasny Metallist Ashkhabad	1	1956
Sbornaya Ashkhabadskoy Oblasti	1	1957
Sbornaya Nebit-Daga	1	1959
Sbornaya Chardzhou	1	1960
Stroitel' Mary	1	1963
Mayak Chardzhou	1	1971
Energostroitel' Mary	1	1972
Tsementnik Bezmein	1	1973
Energetik Mary	1	1976
Shatlyk Mary	1	1977
Stroitel' Nebit-Dag	1	1981
Sel'khoztekhnika Chardzhou	1	1983
SKIF Ashkhabad	1	1987
Akhal Ashkhabadsky Rayon	1	1988
Medik Nebit-Dag	1	1989
Sel'khoztekhnika Ashkhabad	1	1991

== Seasons summary ==
Season	Champions	Runners-up	Third place	Top scorer (Team) – Goals
1992	Köpetdag Aşgabat	Nebitçi Nebitdag	Ahal Akdaşaýak	(Turkmenistan) Sergei Kazankow (TSHT Aşgabat) – 41
1993	Köpetdag Aşgabat (2)	Büzmeýin	Nebitçi Balkanabat	(Turkmenistan) Berdimyrat Nurmyradow (Köpetdag Aşgabat) – 25
1994	Köpetdag Aşgabat (3)	Nisa Aşgabat	Merw Mary	(Turkmenistan) Berdimyrat Nurmyradow (Köpetdag Aşgabat) – 13
1995	Köpetdag Aşgabat (4)	Nisa Aşgabat	Nebitçi Nebit-Dag	(Turkmenistan) Rejepmyrat Agabaýew (Nisa Aşgabat) – 41
1996	Nisa Aşgabat	Köpetdag Aşgabat	Ekskawatorçy Çärjew	(Turkmenistan) Rejepmyrat Agabaýew (Nisa Aşgabat) – 28
1997–98	Köpetdag Aşgabat (5)	Dagdan Aşgabat	Nisa Aşgabat	(Turkmenistan) Rejepmyrat Agabaýew (Nisa Aşgabat) – 17
1998–99	Nisa Aşgabat (2)	Köpetdag Aşgabat	Dagdan Aşgabat	(Turkmenistan) Rejepmyrat Agabaýew (Nisa Aşgabat) – 16 (Turkmenistan) Şarafutdin Jumanyýazow (Turan Daşoguz) – 16 (Turkmenistan) Didargylyç Urazow (Nisa Aşgabat) – 16
2000	Köpetdag Aşgabat (6)	Nebitçi Balkanabat	Nisa Aşgabat	(Turkmenistan) Amandurdy Annadurdyýew (Köpetdag Aşgabat) – 13
2001	Nisa Aşgabat (3)	Köpetdag Aşgabat	Nebitçi Balkanabat	(Turkmenistan) Didargylyç Urazow (Nisa Aşgabat) – 32
2002	Şagadam Türkmenbaşy	Nisa Aşgabat	Garagum Turkmenabat	(Turkmenistan) Rustam Sadykow (Şagadam Türkmenbaşy) – 20
2003	Nisa Aşgabat (4)	Nebitçi Balkanabat	Şagadam Türkmenbaşy	(Turkmenistan) Daýançgylyç Urazow (Nisa Aşgabat) – 21
2004	Nebitçi Balkanabat	Nisa Aşgabat	Merw Mary	(Turkmenistan) Berdi Şamyradow (HTTU Aşgabat) – 19
2005	HTTU Aşgabat	Gazçy Gazojak	Nebitçi Balkanabat	(Turkmenistan) Berdi Şamyradow (HTTU Aşgabat) – 30
2006	HTTU Aşgabat (2)	Nebitçi Balkanabat	FC Aşgabat	(Turkmenistan) Hamza Allamow (Turan Daşoguz) – 22
2007	FC Aşgabat	HTTU Aşgabat	Nebitçi Balkanabat	(Turkmenistan) Berdi Şamyradow (HTTU Aşgabat) – 16
2008	FC Aşgabat (2)	HTTU Aşgabat	Nebitçi Balkanabat	(Turkmenistan) Mämmedaly Garadanow (HTTU Aşgabat) – 12 (Turkmenistan) Berdi Şamyradow (HTTU Aşgabat) – 12
2009	HTTU Aşgabat (3)	Nebitçi Balkanabat	Merw Mary	(Turkmenistan) Berdi Şamyradow (HTTU Aşgabat) – 18
2010	FC Balkan	Altyn Asyr	FC Lebap	(Turkmenistan) Berdi Şamyradow (HTTU Aşgabat) – 11
2011	FC Balkan (2)	HTTU Aşgabat	FC Aşgabat	(Turkmenistan) Mämmedaly Garadanow (HTTU Aşgabat) – 24
2012	FC Balkan (3)	Merw	HTTU Aşgabat	(Turkmenistan) Aleksandr Boliyan (Şagadam) – 23
2013	HTTU Aşgabat (4)	FC Balkan	Altyn Asyr	(Turkmenistan) Mämmedaly Garadanow (FC Balkan) – 26
2014	Altyn Asyr	Ahal	Şagadam	(Turkmenistan) Mämmedaly Garadanow (Şagadam – 28)
2015	Altyn Asyr (2)	FC Balkan	FC Aşgabat	(Turkmenistan) Myrat Ýagşyýew (FC Balkan) – 31
2016	Altyn Asyr (3)	FC Balkan	Energetik Türkmenbaşy	(Turkmenistan) Süleýman Muhadow (Altyn Asyr) – 30
2017	Altyn Asyr (4)	Ahal	Şagadam	(Turkmenistan) Myrat Ýagşyýew (Altyn Asyr) – 28
2018	Altyn Asyr (5)	Ahal	Energetik Türkmenbaşy	(Turkmenistan) Altymyrat Annadurdyýew (Altyn Asyr) – 19
2019	Altyn Asyr (6)	Ahal	Şagadam	(Turkmenistan) Didar Durdyýew (Ahal) – 14
2020	Altyn Asyr (7)	Ahal	Şagadam	(Turkmenistan) Altymyrat Annadurdyýew (Altyn Asyr) – 35
2021	Altyn Asyr (8)	Ahal	Şagadam	(Turkmenistan) Elman Tagaýew (Ahal) – 10
2022	Ahal	Altyn Asyr	Merw	(Turkmenistan) Didar Durdyýew (Ahal) – 27
2023	Arkadag	Altyn Asyr	Nebitçi	(Turkmenistan) Didar Durdyýew (Arkadag) – 26
2024	Arkadag (2)	Ahal	Altyn Asyr	(Turkmenistan) Didar Durdyýew (Arkadag) – 31
2025	Arkadag (3)	Ahal	Altyn Asyr	(Turkmenistan) Didar Durdyýew (Arkadag) – 27
2026	Arkadag (4)	Altyn Asyr	Ahal	(Turkmenistan) Didar Durdyýew (Arkadag) – 24

== Performance by club ==
Team	Champions	Runners-up	Third place
Altyn Asyr	8 (2014, 2015, 2016, 2017, 2018, 2019, 2020, 2021)	3 (2010, 2022, 2023)	3 (2013, 2024, 2025)
Köpetdag Aşgabat	6 (1992, 1993, 1994, 1995, 1997–98, 2000)	3 (1996, 1998–99, 2001)	–
Nebitçi	4 (2004, 2010, 2011, 2012)	8 (1992, 2000, 2003, 2006, 2009, 2013, 2015, 2016)	7 (1993, 1995, 2001, 2005, 2007, 2008, 2023)
Nisa Aşgabat	4 (1996, 1998–99, 2001, 2003)	4 (1994, 1995, 2002, 2004)	2 (1997–98, 2000)
Ýedigen	4 (2005, 2006, 2009, 2013)	3 (2007, 2008, 2011)	1 (2012)
Arkadag	4 (2023, 2024, 2025, 2026)	–	–
Aşgabat	2 (2007, 2008)	–	3 (2006, 2011, 2015)
Ahal	1 (2022)	8 (2014, 2017, 2018, 2019, 2020, 2021, 2024, 2025)	1 (1992)
Şagadam	1 (2002)	–	6 (2003, 2014, 2017, 2019, 2020, 2021)
Merw	–	1 (2012)	4 (1994, 2004, 2009, 2022)
Dagdan Aşgabat	–	1 (1997–98)	1 (1998–99)
Büzmeýin	–	1 (1993)	–
Gazçy Gazojak	–	1 (2005)	–
Bagtyyarlyk-Lebap	–	–	3 (1996, 2002, 2010)
Energetik Mary	–	–	2 (2016, 2018)

== League participation ==
Note: The tallies below include up to the 2026 season. Teams denoted in bold are current participants.

- **34** seasons: **Merw**, **Nebitçi**
- **32** seasons: **Şagadam**
- **26** seasons: **Ahal**, **Köpetdag Aşgabat**
- **23** seasons: Turan
- **21** seasons: **Aşgabat**
- **19** seasons: **Altyn Asyr**
- **17** seasons: Bagtyyarlyk-Lebap
- **13** seasons: Ýedigen
- **12** seasons: Nisa Aşgabat
- **10** seasons: Energetik Mary
- **7** seasons: Talyp Sporty
- **6** seasons: Büzmeýin
- **4** seasons: **Arkadag**
- **3** seasons: Dagdan Aşgabat, Galkan Aşgabat, Gazçy Gazojak
- **2** seasons: Asudalyk Aşgabat, Balkan Nebitdag, Gara Altyn, Kolhozçy Türkmengala, TSHT Aşgabat
- **1** season: Arkaç Gyzylarbat, Babadayhan Babadayhansky Etrap, Bereket Tejen, Hazyna, Hlopkovik Çärjew, Jeýhun Seýdi, Pakhtachi Çärjew, SMM+ Karatamak, Umyt Baýramaly

== Youth championship ==
The Youth League (Turkmen: Ýaşlar liga), also known as Youth teams championship (Turkmen: Ýaşlar arasyndaky birinjilik) full name Youth football championship of Turkmenisatn among teams of clubs of the Higher League (Turkmen: Ýokary liganyň futbol klublarynyň ýaşlar düzümleriniň gatnaşmagyndaky futbol boýunça Türkmenistanyň birinjiligi), is a league that runs in parallel to the Ýokary Liga and includes the youth or reserve teams of the Turkmenistan Higher League teams. The number of players a team can have on the pitch at a time that are over 21 years of age or without a Turkmenistan citizenship is limited. 8 teams participate in the league. Matches are commonly played a day before the match of the senior teams of the respective teams.

=== Youth championship winners (since 2019) ===
- 2019: FC Altyn Asyr-2
- 2020: FC Altyn Asyr-2
- 2021: FC Altyn Asyr-2
- 2022: FC Altyn Asyr-2
- 2023: FC Altyn Asyr-2
- 2024: FC Arkadag-2
