= Rahym Kurbanmämmedow =

Turkmen footballer and coach (born 1963)

Rahim Kurbanmamedov
Personal information
- Full name: Rahym Muhamedowiç Kurbanmämmedow
- Date of birth: 3 October 1963 (age 63)
- Place of birth: Ashgabat, Turkmen SSR, Soviet Union
- Position: Defender

Team information
- Current team: FC Merw (head coach)

Senior career*
Years	Team	Apps	(Gls)
1982–1998	Kopetdag Asgabat		
1998–2000	Nisa Aşgabat		

International career
1992–1998	Turkmenistan		

Managerial career
- 2003–2004: Nisa Aşgabat
- 2003–2004: Turkmenistan
- 2007–2009: Turkmenistan
- 2009: Navbahor Namangan
- 2009–2013: Merw Mary
- 2013–2014: Balkan FT
- 2014: Turkmenistan
- 2015–2017: Energetik
- 2017–2021: Şagadam (assistant)
- 2021–: Merw
- * Club domestic league appearances and goals

Rahim Muhamedovich Kurbanmamedov (born 3 October 1963) is a Turkmen football coach. He is currently a head coach of FC Merw.

== Career ==
=== Playing career ===
He played for Kopetdag Asgabat, Nisa Aşgabat and Turkmenistan national football team from 1992 to 1998

=== Coaching career ===
He has been coach of Turkmenistan national football team from 2003 to 2008. He coached Nisa Aşgabat in 2003–2004, Navbahor Namangan in 2009 and Merw Mary from 2009. In 2013, he went to FC Balkan, with which he won the AFC President's Cup 2013 in Malaysia.

In 2014, he was re-appointed head coach of Turkmenistan national football team. In June 2014 due to poor team play in the final tournament of the AFC Challenge Cup, which resulted in the Turkmenistan footballers being unable to leave the group, he was relieved of his post.

In November 2021, Kurbanmämmedow was appointed manager of Ýokary Liga club FC Merw.

== Achievements ==
- Runner Up 1993 ECO Cup as player of Turkmenistan national football team
- Qualification for 2004 AFC Asian Cup as coach of Turkmenistan national football team
- Champion of 2008 HCMC Cup in Vietnam as coach of Turkmenistan national football team
- AFC President's Cup: 2013
