= Nebitçi FT =

Nebitçi
- Full name: Nebitçi Futbol Topary
- Nickname: Oil workers
- Founded: 1990; 36 years ago
- Ground: Sport Toplumy Stadium, Balkanabat
- Capacity: 10,000
- Owner: Türkmennebit
- Chairman: Durdy Annaberdiyev
- Manager: Aleksandr Klimenko
- League: Ýokary Liga
- 2025: Ýokary Liga, 5th of 9
Home colours	Away colours

Nebitçi Football Team (Turkmen: Nebitçi futbol topary) is a Turkmen professional football club based in Balkanabat. They compete in top division of Turkmen football, the Ýokary Liga. Their home stadium is Balkanabat Stadium which can hold 10,000 people.

== Former names ==
- 1947 – May 2010: Nebitçi
- May 2010 – September 2018: Balkan
- September 2018 – present: Nebitçi

== History ==
=== Soviet Championship ===
Participated in two Soviet Championships (1990–1991): Second League (1990–1991), best result: 10th place in 1991.

=== Turkmenistan ===
In May 2010 the club changed its name to Balkan Balkanabat from Nebitçi Balkanabat by the decision of Turkmenistan Football Federation.

The 2011 season began successfully for FC Balkan, demonstrating the team's readiness to compete for the title. Throughout the season, no other team managed to catch up with the nearly flawless performance of the "oil workers." However, their performance in the Turkmenistan Cup was less impressive, as the team was eliminated in the quarterfinals, losing to Lebap over two legs. On June 25, 2011 Balkan faced the vice-champion, Ashgabat's FC Altyn Asyr, at the Nusaý Stadium in Ashgabat for the Turkmenistan Super Cup. The "oil workers" emerged victorious with a 4:2 win. In the AFC President's Cup, FC Balkan reached the final stage but was knocked out of the tournament in a tense encounter with Taiwan Power Company. Despite this setback, FC Balkan triumphed in the 2011 Ýokary Liga.

In the 2012 season changes occurred in the coaching staff of Balkan. The former head coach, Aleksandr Klimenko, left to take charge of the Namangan-based Navbahor team. He was succeeded by Amanmurat Meredov. Additionally, 49-year-old Turkish specialist Semih Yuvakuran, a former defender for Fenerbahçe, Galatasaray, and the Turkish national team, was invited to join as the team's technical director. On April 30, 2012, Balkan arrived in Dushanbe to participate in the qualification tournament of the 2012 AFC President's Cup. In their first group match, they lost 1–2 to Palestine's Al-Amari. According to head coach Amanmurat Meredov, refereeing errors influenced the outcome of the game. In the second match, Balkan was eliminated from the tournament after a 1–2 defeat to Tajikistan's Istiqlol. Despite these setbacks, Balkan triumphed in the 2012 Ýokary Liga. Under head coach Ali Gurbani, the team also won the 2012 Turkmenistan Cup.

In 2013 Rahim Kurbanmamedov was appointed head coach. In May 2013 the players Balkan FK came in the final of the AFC President's Cup 2013, scoring three wins in the qualifying tournament in Group "C". Games were held in Phnom Penh, in the first match, Balkan FK beat Hilal Al-Quds (3–2), the second Beoung Ket Rubber (2–0) and third Sri Lanka Army (5–0). In the final stage, that took place in Malaysia, Balkan FK players won Three Star Club (6–0) and Erchim (4–0), thus gaining 6 points reached the final of the 2013 AFC President's Cup. They won the 2013 edition of the AFC President's Cup when they beat KRL of Pakistan in the final 1–0.

In 2015 the team was headed by Ali Gurbani. By the end of the season, the club won silver medals in the 2015 Turkmenistan Championship. Striker Murat Ýakşiýew became the league's top scorer, netting 31 goals.

At the beginning of 2016 Turkmen specialist Aleksandr Klimenko took charge of the team. In February 2016 Balkan faced Syria's Al-Wahda on neutral ground and was eliminated from the 2016 AFC Cup. By the end of the season, the club secured second place in the 2016 Ýokary Liga.

From September 2018 it again received the name Nebitchi.

In the 2023 season the footballers of FС Nebitchi secured the 3rd place in the Turkmenistan Championship. FС Nebitchi accumulated 43 points in 24 matches. The team's top scorer was Magtymberdi Berenow, who netted 10 goals. This success for the team was guided by head coach Hojaahmet Arazow, supported by assistant coach Ýagmyrmyrat Annamyradow and goalkeeping coach Rejepberdi Bagaberdiýew.

In December 2024 a grand opening ceremony for the new office building of the FС Nebitchi took place in Balkanabat. The event was attended by football veterans from the Balkan Region and representatives of the Football Federation of Turkmenistan.

=== Domestic ===
Season	League									Turkmenistan Cup	Top goalscorer		Manager
Season	Div.	Pos.	Pl.	W	D	L	GS	GA	P	Turkmenistan Cup	Name	League	Manager
1992	1st	2	28	22	3	3	96	12	47				(Turkmenistan) Täçmyrat Agamyradow
1993	1st	3	8	3	3	2	5	6	16				(Turkmenistan) Täçmyrat Agamyradow
1994	1st	7	18	7	2	9	24	31	16	Semi-final			
1995	1st	3	32	19	4	9	87	44	61				
1996	1st	6	32	13	6	13	39	43	45				
1997–98	1st	4	20	9	1	10	29	35	28	Runner-up			
1998–99	1st	4	32	18	5	9	63	45	59	Runner-up			
2000	1st	2	20	13	2	5	42	21	41				(Turkmenistan) Bayramdurdy Durdyyev
2001	1st	3	32	18	6	8	58	37	60	Runner-up			
2002	1st	5	32	16	5	11	61	39	53	Quarter-final			
2003	1st	2	36	23	10	3	100	23	79	Winners			(Turkmenistan) Valeriy Fursov (Turkmenistan) Bayram Begench
2004	1st	1	36	27	3	6	78	23	84	Winners			(Turkmenistan) Ashir Begzhanov (Turkmenistan) Amanmyrat Meredow
2005	1st	3	32	17	7	8	48	29	58	Quarter-final			
2006	1st	2	28	15	6	7	38	19	51	Semi-final			(Turkmenistan) Amanmyrat Meredow
2007	1st	3	28	14	4	41	43	33	46	Semi-final			(Turkmenistan) Amanmyrat Meredow
2008	1st	3	20	14	2	4	42	16	44	Quarter-final			(Turkmenistan) Amanmyrat Meredow (Turkmenistan) Aleksandr Klimenko
2009	1st	2	16	12	2	2	35	11	38	Semi-final	(Turkmenistan) Mämmedaly Garadanow	10	(Turkmenistan) Aleksandr Klimenko
2010	1st	1	18	12	4	2	35	8	40	Winners	(Turkmenistan) Didargylyç Urazow	10	(Turkmenistan) Rejepmyrat Agabaýew
2011	1st	1	36	26	4	6	78	30	82	Quarter-final			(Turkmenistan) Aleksandr Klimenko
2012	1st	1	32	23	4	5	66	19	73	Winners	(Turkmenistan) Mämmedaly Garadanow	16	(Turkmenistan) Amanmurad Meredov (Turkmenistan) Ali Gurbani
2013	1st	2	36	28	2	6	86	25	86		(Turkmenistan) Mämmedaly Garadanow	26	(Turkmenistan) Rahym Kurbanmämmedow
2014	1st	5	36	15	5	16	47	24	50	Runner-up			(Turkmenistan) Rahym Kurbanmämmedow
2015	1st	2	36	20	8	8	75	36	68	Semi-final	(Turkmenistan) Myrat Ýagşyýew	31	(Turkmenistan) Ali Gurbani
2016	1st	2	36	22	6	8	42	37	72	Semi-final			

=== Continental ===
Season	Competition	Round	Club	Home	Away	Aggregate
2000–01	Asian Cup Winners' Cup	First round	(Uzbekistan) Dinamo Samarqand	4–3	3–2	7–5
2000–01	Asian Cup Winners' Cup	Second round	(Kazakhstan) Kairat	1–0	1–3	2–3
2004	AFC Cup	Group stage	(Syria) Al-Jaish	0–6	0–0	4th
2004	AFC Cup	Group stage	(Lebanon) Olympic Beirut	0–2	1–2	4th
2005	AFC Cup	Group stage	(Jordan) Al-Faisaly	3–3	1–1	2nd
2005	AFC Cup	Group stage	(India) East Bengal	3–2	2–3	2nd
2005	AFC Cup	Group stage	(Bangladesh) Muktijoddha Sangsad	0–1	2–1	2nd
2007	AFC Cup	Group stage	(Jordan) Al-Faisaly	0–0	0–2	4th
2007	AFC Cup	Group stage	(Oman) Dhofar	0–1	0–1	4th
2007	AFC Cup	Group stage	(Lebanon) Al-Ansar	1–1	1–3	4th
2011	AFC President's Cup	Group stage	(Chinese Taipei) Taipower FC	1–1		2nd
2011	AFC President's Cup	Group stage	Nepal Police Club	2–0		2nd
2011	AFC President's Cup	Group stage	(Pakistan) WAPDA	1–0		2nd
2011	AFC President's Cup	Final stage	(Chinese Taipei) Taipower FC	3–4		2nd
2011	AFC President's Cup	Final stage	(Tajikistan) Istiklol	1–1		2nd
2012	AFC President's Cup	Group stage	(Palestine) Markaz Shabab Al-Am'ari	1–2		3rd
2012	AFC President's Cup	Group stage	(Tajikistan) Istiklol	1–2		3rd
2013	AFC President's Cup	Group stage	(Palestine) Hilal Al-Quds	3–2		1st
2013	AFC President's Cup	Group stage	(Cambodia) Boeung Ket Angkor	2–0		1st
2013	AFC President's Cup	Group stage	Sri Lanka Army	5–0		1st
2013	AFC President's Cup	Final stage	(Nepal) Three Star Club	6–0		1st
2013	AFC President's Cup	Final stage	(Mongolia) Erchim	4–0		1st
2013	AFC President's Cup	Final	(Pakistan) KRL	1–0		
2016	AFC Cup	Qualifying play-off	(Syria) Al-Wahda	0–2		
2017	AFC Cup	Preliminary stage 2	(Kyrgyzstan) Dordoi Bishkek	1–2	1–1	2–3

== Managers ==
- (Turkmenistan) Tachmurad Agamuradov (1991–93)
- (Turkmenistan) Amanmyrat Meredow (2004–08)
- (Turkmenistan) Rejepmyrat Agabaýew (2009)
- (Turkmenistan) Aleksandr Klimenko (2010–11)
- (Turkmenistan) Amanmyrat Meredow (2011–12)
- (Turkmenistan) Ali Gurbani (2012)
- (Turkey) Semih Yuvakuran (2012)
- (Turkmenistan) Rahym Kurbanmämmedow (2013–2014)
- (Turkmenistan) Ali Gurbani (2015)
- (Turkmenistan) Aleksandr Klimenko (2016)
- (Turkmenistan) Hojaahmet Arazow (2018)
- (Turkmenistan) Amanmyrat Meredow (2019–2020)
- (Turkmenistan) Amangylyç Koçumow (2020–2022)
- (Turkmenistan) Hojaahmet Arazow (2023–2024)
- (Turkmenistan) Aleksandr Klimenko (2025–)

== Club officials ==
=== Management ===
Position	Name & Surname
Administrator	(Turkmenistan) Ýusup Annagurbanow
Administrator	(Turkmenistan) Nurmyrat Ballyýew
Administrator	(Turkmenistan) Azatguly Annahalow
Administrator	(Turkmenistan) Aşyrgeldi Goşlyýew

=== Current technical staff ===
Current technical staff of the team are as follows:

Position	Name & Surname
Team manager	(Turkmenistan) Amangylyç Koçumow
GK Coach	(Turkmenistan) Rejepberdi Bagaberdiýew
Coach	(Turkmenistan) Berdi Şamyradow
Coach	(Turkmenistan) Baýramdurdy Durdyýew
Coach	(Turkmenistan) Meret Saparow
Coach	(Turkmenistan) Gurbanmämmet Meredew
Doctor	(Turkmenistan) Rahym Ýarmuhammedow
Body massager	(Turkmenistan) Söhbet Mämmetgeldiýew

== Honours ==
=== Domestic ===
- Ýokary Liga
  - Champions (4): 2004, 2010, 2011, 2012
- Turkmenistan Cup
  - Winners (4): 2003, 2004, 2010, 2012
- Turkmenistan Super Cup
  - Winners (3): 2006, 2011, 2012

=== Continental (Regional) ===
- AFC President's Cup
  - Winners (1): 2013
