= Didargylyç Urazow =

Turkmen footballer (1977–2016)

Personal information
- Date of birth: 27 February 1977
- Place of birth: Turkmen SSR, USSR
- Date of death: 7 June 2016 (aged 39)
- Place of death: Ashgabat, Turkmenistan
- Height: 1.68 m (5 ft 6 in)
- Position: Striker

Senior career*
Years	Team	Apps	(Gls)
1996–2001	Nisa Aşgabat	89	(56)
2002	FC Irtysh	19	(14)
2003	Nisa Aşgabat	30	(21)
2003	FC Metalist Kharkiv	6	(3)
2004–2006	FC Irtysh	74	(49)
2007	FC Tobol	17	(12)
2008–2010	FC Irtysh	46	(32)
2011–2012	FC Ahal	25	(21)
2010–2014	Balkan FK	?	(?)

International career
1996–2003	Turkmenistan	16	(5)
- * Club domestic league appearances and goals

Didargylyç Urazow (27 February 1977 – 7 June 2016) was a Turkmen footballer as a striker. He is a former member of the Turkmenistan national football team.

== Club career ==
In 2010, he returned to Ýokary Liga. As part of Balkan FK he became champion of Turkmenistan, and in the list of top-scorers he shared second place (10 goals). In 2011, together with Balkan FK, he repeatedly became champion of Turkmenistan, but did not differ in high productivity (three goals after the first 22 rounds). In 2013, he won the 2013 AFC President's Cup. In 2010–2014, he played for Balkan FK, where he ended his career.

== Club career stats ==
Season	Team	Country	Division	Apps	Goals
1996	Nisa Aşgabat	Turkmenistan	1	??	??
1997	Nisa Aşgabat	Turkmenistan	1	??	??
1998	Nisa Aşgabat	Turkmenistan	1	??	??
1999	Nisa Aşgabat	Turkmenistan	1	??	??
2000	Nisa Aşgabat	Turkmenistan	1	??	??
2001	Nisa Aşgabat	Turkmenistan	1	??	??
2002	FC Irtysh	Kazakhstan	1	19	8
2003	Nisa Aşgabat	Turkmenistan	1	??	??
03/04	FC Metalist Kharkiv	Ukraine	2	6	2
2004	FC Irtysh	Kazakhstan	1	26	9
2005	FC Irtysh	Kazakhstan	1	22	10
2006	FC Irtysh	Kazakhstan	1	26	10
2007	FC Tobol	Kazakhstan	1	17	5
2008	FC Irtysh	Kazakhstan	1		

== International career statistics ==
=== Goals for senior national team ===
#	Date	Venue	Opponent	Score	Result	Competition
1.	19 November 2003	Ashgabat, Turkmenistan	Afghanistan	11–0	Won	2006 FIFAWorld Cup qualification
2.	28 November 2003	Damascus, Syria	Syria	1–1	Draw	2004 AFC Asian Cup qualification
