= Daýançgylyç Urazow =

Turkmen football striker

Daýançgylyç Urazow is a Turkmen football striker who played for Turkmenistan in the 2004 AFC Asian Cup.
