= Rejepmyrat Agabaýew =

Turkmenistan footballer (born 1973)

Personal information
- Date of birth: 1 August 1973 (age 53)
- Place of birth: Turkmen SSR, Soviet Union
- Position: Striker

Team information
- Current team: FC Okzhetpes

Senior career*
Years	Team	Apps	(Gls)
1990–1991	Nebitçi Balkanabat	62	(16)
1994–1999	Nisa Aşgabat	103	(114)
1999–2002	FC Kairat	75	(34)
2002–2005	FC Atyrau	63	(23)
2005–2007	FC Kyzylzhar	11	(2)
2007	FC Aşgabat	?	(12)

International career^{‡}
1994–2003	Turkmenistan	14	(5)
- * Club domestic league appearances and goals as of October 8, 2009 ‡ National team caps and goals as of October 8, 2009

Rejepmyrat Agabaýew (born 1 August 1973) is a professional Turkmenistani football player. Now working as a coach in FC Okzhetpes in Kazakhstan.

== National team ==
He was called up to the Turkmenistan national team. Rejepmyrat appeared in the largest ever win for Turkmenistan, a match at home against Afghanistan national team in which Agabaýew scored one of Turkmenistan's eleven goals.

== International goals ==
#	Date	Venue	Opponent	Score	Result	Competition
.	25 April 1997	Nisa-Çandybil Stadium, Ashgabat, Turkmenistan	Azerbaijan	1–0	2–0	Friendly
