= Türkmenabat Stadium =

Sport Toplumy Stadium
- Interactive map of Sport Toplumy Stadium
- Location: Türkmenabat, Turkmenistan
- Coordinates: 39°03′13″N 63°35′26″E
- Owner: Türkmenabat city Administration
- Capacity: 10,000
- Surface: Artificial turf

Construction
- Opened: 2009
- General contractor: Itera

Tenant
- FC Bagtyyarlyk-Lebap

Sport Toplumy Stadium is a multi-purpose stadium in Türkmenabat, Turkmenistan. It is currently used mostly for football matches and serves as the home for FC Bagtyyarlyk-Lebap. The stadium holds 10,000 people.

== History ==
The sports complex started being built in April 2008. Construction works were carried out by Russian company Itera. The project cost $20 million. It opened in May 2009.
