= Mämmedaly Garadanow =

Turkmen footballer

Personal information
- Date of birth: March 17, 1982 (age 44)
- Place of birth: Nebit-Dag, Turkmen SSR, Soviet Union
- Position: Striker

Team information
- Current team: FC Energetik
- Number: 22

Senior career*
| Years | Team | Apps | (Gls) |
| 2003 | Asudalyk Asgabat | | (13) |
| 2004–2007 | HTTU Asgabat | | (44) |
| 2007–2008 | FK Karvan | 10 | (1) |
| 2008–2013 | HTTU Asgabat | | (36) |
| 2009-2013 | Nebitçi | | (52) |
| 2014 | FC Şagadam | | (26) |
| 2015–2016 | FC Ahal | | |
| 2016–2021 | Nebitçi | | (4) |
| 2021– | FC Energetik Mary | | |

International career^{‡}
| 2004–2011 | Turkmenistan | 21 | (5) |
- * Club domestic league appearances and goals as of 11 March 2020 ‡ National team caps and goals as of 8 February 2015

Mämmedaly Garadanow (born March 17, 1982) is a Turkmen footballer (striker) playing currently for FC Energetik Mary. Garadanow is also a member of Turkmenistan national football team. He scored two goals in the game versus Cambodia in 2010 FIFA World Cup qualification (AFC). In 2013 with FC Balkan he won the AFC-President's Cup 2013 in Malaysia.

== Club career ==
In 2014, he moved to FC Şagadam, where he became the bronze medalist of Turkmenistan and top scorer of 2014 Ýokary Liga (28 goals).

In 2015, he moved to the FC Ahal.

On 7 April 2021, Garadanow transferred to Turkmen club FC Energetik Mary.

== Achievements ==
- AFC President's Cup: 2013

== International career statistics ==
=== Goals for Senior National Team ===
| # | Date | Venue | Opponent | Score | Result | Competition |
|---|---|---|---|---|---|---|
| | October 11, 2007 | Phnom Penh, Cambodia | Cambodia | 1–0 | Won | 2010 FIFA World Cup qualification |
| | October 28, 2007 | Ashgabat, Turkmenistan | Cambodia | 4–1 | Won | 2010 FIFA World Cup qualification |
| | February 17, 2010 | Colombo, Sri Lanka | North Korea | 1–1 | Draw | 2010 AFC Challenge Cup |
| | February 19, 2010 | Colombo, Sri Lanka | India | 1–0 | Won | 2010 AFC Challenge Cup |
