= Şagadam Stadium =

Sports venue in Turkmenbashy, Turkmenistan

Coordinates: 40°00′52″N 52°59′17″E

Shagadam Stadium
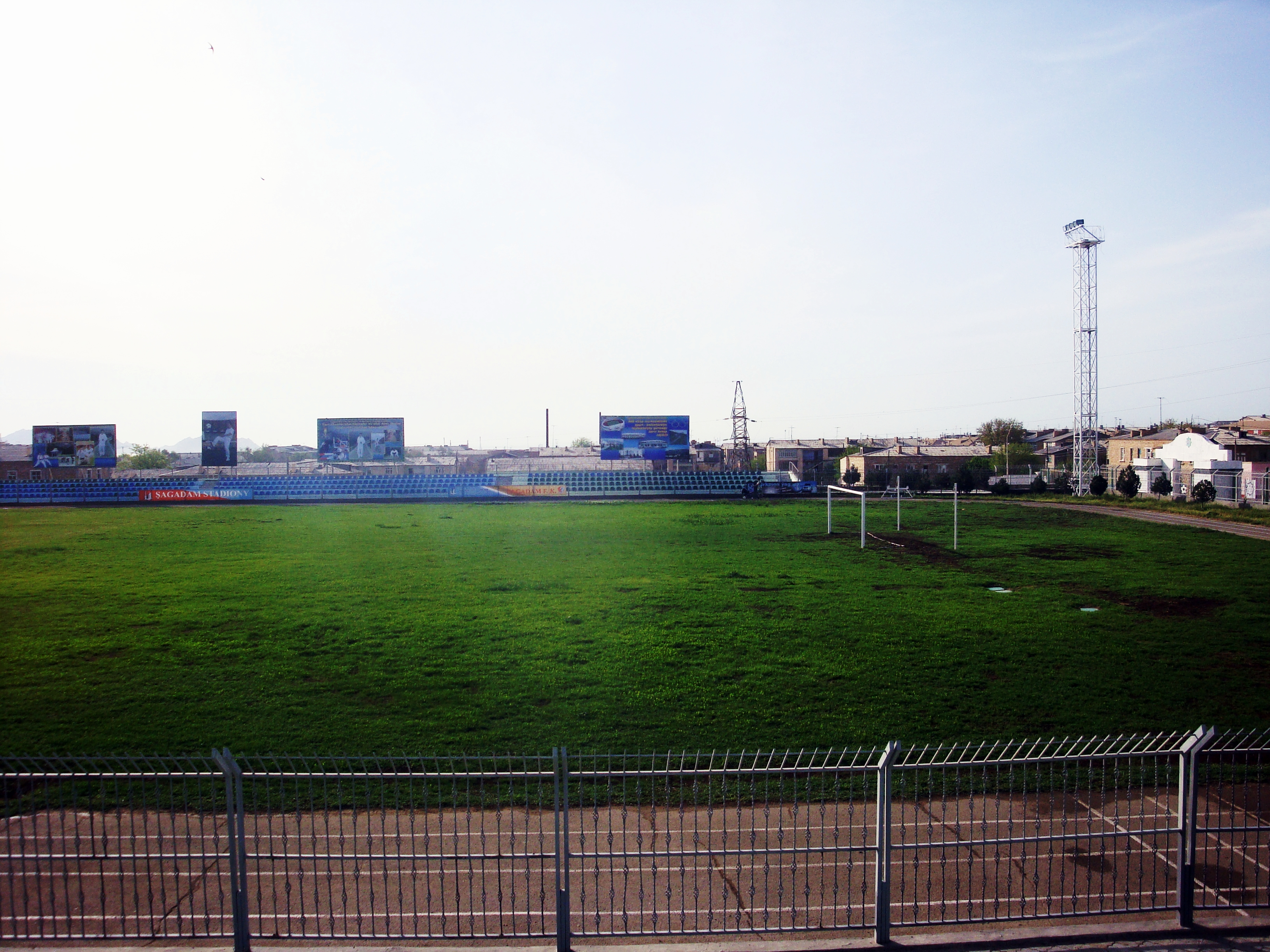
- Interactive map of Shagadam Stadium
- Location: Turkmenbashi, Turkmenistan
- Owner: Turkmenbashi oil processing complex
- Capacity: 1,500
- Surface: Grass

Tenant
- Şagadam Türkmenbaşy

Shagadam Stadium (Turkmen: «Şagadam» stadiony; Russian: Стадион «Шагадам») is a stadium in Turkmenbashi, Turkmenistan. It is currently used mostly for Ýokary Liga football matches and serves as the home for Şagadam Türkmenbaşy. The stadium originally had natural grass and capacity for 1,500 peoples.

== History ==
The stadium hosted soccer 2006 Turkmenistan Cup and 2021 Turkmenistan Cup finals.
