= Sport toplumy (Mary) =

Stadium in Mary, turkmenistan

Mary Sport Toplumy
- Interactive map of Mary Sport Toplumy
- Location: Mary, Turkmenistan
- Coordinates: 37°36′26″N 61°50′44″E
- Owner: Mary city Administration
- Capacity: 10,000
- Surface: Grass

Construction
- Opened: 2009
- General contractor: Kılıç İnşaat

Tenant
- FC Merw

Mary Sport Toplumy is a multi-purpose stadium in Mary, Turkmenistan. It is currently used mostly for football matches and serves as the home stadium for Merw Mary. The stadium holds 10,000 people.

== History ==
The sports complex opened in May 2009. First match was played between Merw Mary and Afghan FC Esteghlal Herat, ended in 6–0. Construction works carried out by Turkish company Kılıç İnşaat. The project cost $20 million.
