= Sport toplumy (Balkanabat) =

Multi-purpose stadium in Balkanabat, Turkmenistan

Balkanabat Sports Complex
- Interactive map of Balkanabat Sports Complex
- Full name: Balkanabat sport toplumy
- Location: Balkanabat, Balkan Region, Turkmenistan
- Coordinates: 39°32′39″N 54°20′58″E
- Owner: Balkanabat city Administration
- Capacity: 10,000
- Surface: Grass

Construction
- Opened: 14.10.2009
- Cost: 20 million USD
- General contractor: Özaylar Inşaat

Tenant
- Nebitçi FT (2009-nowadays)

The Balkanabat Sports Complex or Sport Toplumy Stadium is a multi-purpose stadium in Balkanabat, Turkmenistan. It is currently used mostly for football matches and serves as the home for Nebitçi FT. The stadium holds 10,000 people. It is located near the Balkanabat Health Trail, in close proximity to the ridge of the Uly Balkan.

== History ==
The sports complex opened on 14 October 2009. Construction works carried out by Turkish company Özaylar Inşaat on request Ministry of Sports of Turkmenistan. The project cost $20 million.

The sports complex includes a stadium for 10,000 spectators, sports facilities for volleyball, basketball, boxing, wrestling, mini-football, tennis. There is a fitness center with gym, swimming pool, a small hotel with 50 rooms. Parking areas for vehicles are arranged around the stadium.

== Events ==
On 14 November 2017, the stadium hosted the Turkmenistan national football team for the first time for a 2019 AFC Asian Cup qualification – third round match against Chinese Taipei, which ended in a 2–1 win for Turkmenistan, attendance 9500 peoples.

On 4 December 2024, the 2024 Turkmenistan Super Cup final was hosted in the stadium.
