= FC Talyp Sporty =

Talyp Sporty
- Full name: Talyp Sporty
- Founded: 2007; 18 years ago
- Ground: Köpetdag Stadium, Aşgabat, Turkmenistan
- Capacity: 26,000
- League: Turkmenistan League
- 2014: Turkmenistan League, 8th
Home colours

Talyp Sporty Aşgabat is a Turkmen football club based in Aşgabat. They play in the top division in Turkmenistani football, the Turkmenistan Higher League. Their home stadium is Köpetdag Stadium which can hold 26,000 people.
