= Nisa Aşgabat =

Turkmen association football club

- Full name: Nisa Aşgabat
- Founded: 1994; 31 years ago
- Ground: Nisa-Çandybil Stadium, Aşgabat, Turkmenistan
- Capacity: 1,500
- Chairman: Seýdiýew Çary
- League: Birinji liga

Nisa Aşgabat is a Turkmen professional football club based in Aşgabat. They relegated from the top division in Turkmen football in 2006 and currently play in the second division, the Birinji liga. Their home stadium is Nisa-Çandybil Stadium, which can accommodate 1,500 spectators.

== Honours ==
- Ýokary Liga
  - Champions (4): 1996, 1998–99, 2001, 2003
- Turkmenistan Cup
  - Winners: 1998
  - Runners-up: 1996, 2000, 2003

== Performance in AFC competitions ==
- AFC Champions League: 2 appearances

2002–03: Group stage

- Asian Club Championship: 2 appearances

1998: Second Round
2001: First Round

- AFC Cup: 2 appearances

2004: Group stage
2005: Group stage

- AFC Cup Winners Cup: 2 appearances

1998–99: Second Round
2001–02: First Round
