= FC Bagtyyarlyk-Lebap =

Lebap
- Full name: Futbol Kluby Lebap
- Founded: 2008; 17 years ago
- Ground: Türkmenabat Stadium, Türkmenabat
- Capacity: 10,000
- Manager: Rinat Habibulin
- League: Birinji liga

FK Lebap is a Turkmenistan football club based in Türkmenabat. Since 2015 they've played in the second division; the Birinji liga. Their home stadium is Türkmenabat Stadium which can hold 10,000 people.

== History ==
The club has taken part in the championship of Turkmenistan since 1992.

From 1996 the club added Eskavatorshik to their name. In the winter break of the 1997-1998 Championship, the club changed its name to Jeyhun.

Since 2002, the club has been called Garagum. That year the team won the Cup of Turkmenistan, and among the leading players were Vitaly Alekperov, Zarif Ereshev, Yazguly Hodjageldiev, Berdy Nurmuradov, and Nikolay Yermilov (their goalkeeper, who saved two penalties in the shoot-out in the Cup final).

In 2003, the team was suspected of intentional failure to check out the games, which is why the club missed the 2nd part of the championship.

Because of financial difficulties, they did not participate in the championship of Turkmenistan until 2008.

In 2013, the club began performing under the name Bagtyyarlyk-Lebap.

== Honours ==
- Turkmenistan Cup: 1
  - Winners (1): 2002
- Ýokary Liga:
  - Third place (3): 1996, 2002, 2010

== Personnel ==
Position	Staff
President	Kamiljan Priev
Head Club	Azim Muradov
Coach	Rinat Habibulin
Head Coach	Timur Husainov
Administrator	Aziz Haydarov
Massagist	Garaýew T.R

== Links ==
- Official website
