= Turan FK =

Turan
- Full name: Turan futbol kluby
- Founded: 1992; 33 years ago
- Ground: Sport Toplumy Stadium, Daşoguz, Turkmenistan
- Capacity: 10,000
- League: Ýokary Liga
- 2017: 9
Home colours	Away colours

Turan Football Club (Turkmen: Turan futbol kluby) is a football club based in Daşoguz, Turkmenistan. They play in the top division in Turkmen football, the Turkmenistan Higher League. Their home stadium is Sport Toplumy Stadium. In May 2010, the club changed its name to Daşoguz from Turan Daşoguz by the decision of Turkmenistan Football Federation. In 2016, the old name returned.

== Achievements ==
- Turkmenistan Cup: 1
  - Winner: 1995
  - Finalist: 1994

== Performance in AFC competitions ==
- Asian Cup Winners Cup: 2 appearances

1995–96: First Round
1996–97: First Round
