= Merw FK =

Merw Mary
- Full name: Merw Mary Bedenterbiýe-Sport Futbol Kluby
- Founded: 1991; 35 years ago
- Ground: Mary Sport Toplumy
- Capacity: 10,000
- Chairman: Gurbangeldi Orazow
- Manager: Rahym Kurbanmämmedow
- League: Ýokary Liga
- 2025: Ýokary Liga, 8th of 8
Home colours	Away colours

Physical Culture and Sports Football Club Merw Mary (Turkmen: Merw Mary Bedenterbiýe-Sport Futbol Kluby), also known as Merw Mary, is a professional football club based in Mary, Turkmenistan. They play in the national top division; the Ýokary Liga. Their home stadium is Mary Sport Toplumy.

== Historical names ==
- until 1966 – Lokomotiv Mary
- 1967 – Murgab Mary
- 1968–1989 – Garagum Mary (Kara-Kum Mary)
- 1990-until now – Merw Mary

== Current squad ==
As of 13 June 2024

Note: Flags indicate national team as defined under FIFA eligibility rules; some limited exceptions apply. Players may hold more than one non-FIFA nationality.

No.	Pos.	Nation	Player
1	GK	TKM	Anton Maksimov
2	DF	TKM	Shazada Bashimov
3	MF	TKM	Shohrat Ovmadov
4	DF	TKM	Ambyar Mahmudov
5	DF	TKM	Rejep Rejepov
6	DF	TKM	Azat Orazmuhammedov
7	FW	TKM	Rustam Matrizaev
8	FW	TKM	Yagshyhaset Dovletgeldiyev
9	DF	TKM	Maksat Atagarryyev
10	MF	TKM	Kemal Annamuhammedov
12	DF	TKM	Doviet Dovietmyradov

No.	Pos.	Nation	Player
13	MF	TKM	Igor Sekov
14	MF	TKM	Dayanch Durdyyev
16	GK	TKM	Nurgeldy Astanov
17	MF	TKM	Musa Nurnazarov
18	MF	TKM	Babanyyaz Charyyev
19	MF	TKM	Amangeldi Saparov
20	DF	TKM	Begench Palvanov
21	MF	TKM	Myrat Ovezmyradov
30	GK	TKM	Merdan Saparov
77	FW	TKM	Toyly Gocnazarow
90	FW	TKM	Murad Yaksiyew

== History ==
In 1967–1969 and 1990–1991, the team played in the Soviet Second League.

The first big success of Merw FK after the collapse of the USSR came when they reached the final of the Turkmenistan Cup in 1993. In the final, they lost to Köpetdag Aşgabat with a score of 0:4. A year later, the team were the bronze prize-winner of the 1994 Ýokary Liga and took part in the preliminary round of the Asian Cup Winners' Cup 1994/95 season. The next 10 years were not marked by significant progress, but in 2004 Merw FK became one of the strongest football clubs in Turkmenistan. Merw FK claimed the bronze medal for the second time in the 2004 Ýokary Liga and, in 2005, they won the Cup of Turkmenistan. Their opponents in the Turkmenistan Cup final was Köpetdag Aşgabat (the game finished 1–1 after extra time and Merw FK won 3–1 on penalties). In 2006, the team, for the second time, entered the international arena by taking part in the 2006 AFC Cup and lost to the teams Dempo SC (2:2, 1:6) and Al-Nasr (0:2, 1:4).

Between 2007 and 2009, Merw FK played in the finals of the Turkmenistan Cup three times in a row. They lost to Şagadam FK in 2007 (0:1), won in 2008 by beating FC HTTU (2:1) and lost in 2009 to FC Altyn Asyr (0:3). In 2008, Merw FK won the Turkmenistan Super Cup by beating the champion of Turkmenistan FC Ashgabat. In 2009, for the third time in their history, Merw FK won the bronze medal in the 2009 Ýokary Liga.

In 2012, the club became the silver prize-winner of the 2012 Ýokary Liga for the first time in history.

In the 2022 season, Magtymguly Begenjew as head coach led the team to the third place in Ýokary Liga, securing an AFC Cup spot for the Merw FK after a 16-year absence.

== Honours ==
=== League and cup record ===
Season	League									Turkmenistan Cup	Top goalscorer		Manager
Season	Div.	Pos.	P	W	D	L	F	A	Pts	Turkmenistan Cup	Name	League goals	Manager
2015	1st	8th	36	11	9	16	39	50	42	Round of 16			(Turkmenistan) Rahmanguly Baýlyýew
2016	1st	5th	36	17	6	13	42	36	57				(Turkmenistan) Rahmanguly Baýlyýew
2017	1st	8th	32	10	3	19	34	61	33				(Turkmenistan) Rahmanguly Baýlyýew
2022	1st	3rd	28	14	4	10	44	39	46	Quarterfinals	Alibek Abdyrahmanow	21	(Turkmenistan) Magtymguly Begenjew

- Ýokary Liga
  - Runners-up: 2012
- Turkmenistan Cup: 2
  - Winners: 2005, 2008
  - Runners-up: 1993, 2007, 2009
- Turkmenistan Super Cup: 1
  - Winners: 2008
  - Runners-up: 2005

== Performance in AFC competitions ==
- AFC Cup: 2 appearances

2006: Group Stage
2023–24: Group Stage

- Asian Cup Winners Cup: 1 appearance

1994–95: Preliminary Round

== Managers ==
- (Turkmenistan) Murad Bayramow (2005–06)
- (Turkmenistan) Merdan Nursahatow (2006–2008)
- (Turkmenistan) Magtymguly Begenjew (2008–2010)
- (Turkmenistan) Rahym Kurbanmämmedow (2011–2012)
- (Turkmenistan) Rahmanguly Baýlyýew (2015–2018)
- (Turkmenistan) Mekan Nasyrow (2019)
- (Turkmenistan) Magtymguly Begenjew (2020–2021)
- (Turkmenistan) Rahym Kurbanmämmedow (2021–)
- (Turkmenistan) Magtymguly Begenjew (2022–present)

Backroom Staff
Name	Role
Rahym Kurbanmämmedow	Manager
Witaliy Alikperow	Assistant Manager
Magtymguly Begenjew	Fitness Trainer
Ovez Annamammedow	Goalkeeping Trainer
Wladimir Caryyew	Offensive Trainer
Dowlet Muhammetow	Defensive Trainer
Mukam Durdyyew	Medic
