= 2019 Ýokary Liga =

Ýokary Liga
- Season: 2019
- Champions: Altyn Asyr (6th title)
- AFC Cup: Altyn Asyr; Ahal
- Matches: 112
- Goals: 291 (2.6 per match)
- Top goalscorer: Didar Durdyýew
- Biggest home win: Altyn Asyr 6–0 Merw
- Highest scoring: Altyn Asyr 5–2 Nebitçi
- Longest winning run: 8 matches: Altyn Asyr (1 Jun–19 Oct)
- Longest winless run: 19 matches: Merw (7 Apr-26 Oct)

2019 Ýokary Liga season was the 27th edition of the top tier professional Yokary Liga football annual competition in Turkmenistan administered by the Football Federation of Turkmenistan.

Altyn Asyr defended their championship, winning their sixth title.

== League table ==
Pos	Team	Pld	W	D	L	GF	GA	GD	Pts	Qualification or relegation
1	Altyn Asyr (C)	28	19	6	3	67	25	+42	63	Qualification for AFC Cup group stage
2	Ahal (Q)	28	15	9	4	44	17	+27	54	Qualification for AFC Cup preliminary round 2 (Note: Since league champions Altyn Asyr were also Turkmenistan Cup winners, the league runners-up qualified for the AFC Cup preliminary round 2.)
3	Şagadam	28	15	7	6	41	25	+16	52	
4	Köpetdag	28	11	6	11	33	37	−4	39	
5	Energetik	28	8	8	12	28	48	−20	32	
6	Aşgabat	28	8	7	13	29	44	−15	31	
7	Nebitçi	28	7	6	15	26	43	−17	27	
8	Merw	28	2	5	21	23	52	−29	11	

Source: TFF
Rules for classification: 1) Points; 2) Head-to-head points; 3) Head-to-head goal difference; 4) Head-to-head goals scored; 5) Goal difference; 6) Goals scored.
(C) Champions; (Q) Qualified for the phase indicated

== Results ==
=== Matches 1–14 ===
Home \ Away	ALT	SAG	AHA	KOP	ENE	NEB	ASG	MER
Altyn Asyr	—	1–1	1–1	2–0	1–1	5–2	1–1	6–0
Şagadam	2–1	—	0–1	2–1	4–1	1–1	2–0	1–0
Ahal	2–2	2–1	—	1–1	1–0	3–0	2–0	3–0
Köpetdag	0–1	1–4	1–1	—	1–1	1–0	2–1	2–2
Energetik	0–2	2–2	2–1	0–3	—	1–0	1–2	1–0
Nebitçi	1–2	1–2	0–0	1–0	0–0	—	1–0	1–0
Aşgabat	1–2	0–3	0–0	1–2	0–2	2–1	—	1–0
Merw	1–3	0–0	0–1	4–2	0–1	1–2	1–2	—

Updated to match(es) played on unknown. Source:
Legend: Blue = home team win; Yellow = draw; Red = away team win.

=== Matches 15–28 ===
Home \ Away	ALT	SAG	AHA	KOP	ENE	NEB	ASG	MER
Altyn Asyr	—	2–0	3–0^			3–0		
Şagadam		—	1–0				2–1	1–1
Ahal			—		4–0	0–0	5–0	
Köpetdag		2–0		—			1–0	
Energetik				0–1	—	2–3		
Nebitçi				0–2		—		1–0
Aşgabat					2–3		—	2–1
Merw	1–4			1–1				—

Updated to match(es) played on unknown. Source:
Legend: Blue = home team win; Yellow = draw; Red = away team win.

^Altyn Asyr awarded 3–0 as Ahal forfeited

== Teams ==
Location of teams in the 2019 Ýokary Liga

A total of 8 teams contested the league.

Club	Location	Stadium	Capacity	Coach	Kit sponsor
Ahal	Änew	Ashgabat Stadium (Auxiliary field)	500	(Turkmenistan) Rovshen Meredov	Nike
Altyn Asyr	Ashgabat	Ashgabat Stadium (Auxiliary field)	500	(Turkmenistan) Ýazguly Hojageldiýew	Puma
Aşgabat	Ashgabat	Nusay Stadium	3000	(Turkmenistan) Said Seýidow	Adidas
Nebitchi	Balkanabat	Balkanabat Sport Complex	10,000	(Turkmenistan) Amanmyrat Meredow	Lotto
Energetik	Turkmenbashi village, Mary Region	Energetik stadiony	1,000	(Turkmenistan) Rahmanguly Baýlyýew	
Köpetdag Aşgabat	Ashgabat	Köpetdag Stadium	26,000	(Turkmenistan) Tofik Şükürow	Starion
Merw	Mary	Mary Sport Complex	10,000	(Turkmenistan) Mekan Nasyrow	Nike
Şagadam	Türkmenbaşy	Şagadam Stadium	5,000	(Turkmenistan) Aleksandr Klimenko	

=== Managerial changes ===
Team	Outgoing manager	Manner of departure	Date of vacancy	Position in table	Incoming manager	Date of appointment
Köpetdag Aşgabat	(Turkmenistan) Saýid Seýidow	Of their own accord	17 May 2019	6	(Turkmenistan) Çary Annakow	17 May 2019
Köpetdag Aşgabat	(Turkmenistan) Çary Annakow	Temporarily served as head coach	June 2019	5	(Turkmenistan) Tofik Şükürow	June 2019
FC Aşgabat	(Turkmenistan) Amangylyç Koçumow	Resignation	July 2019	7	(Turkmenistan) Saýid Seýidow	August 2019
FC Ahal	(Turkmenistan) Röwşen Meredow	Resignation	16 September 2019	3	(Turkmenistan) Amangylyç Koçumow	16 September 2019
FC Ahal	(Turkmenistan) Amangylyç Koçumow	Resignation	October 2019	3	(Turkmenistan) Baýramnyýaz Berdiýew	November 2019

== Top goal-scorers ==
The top scorers are: Updated to match played on 10 December 2019.

Rank	Player	Club	Goals (penalty)
1	Didar Durdyýew	FC Ahal	14
2	Altymyrat Annadurdyýew	FC Altyn Asyr	12
3	Myrat Annaýew	FC Altyn Asyr	10
4	Pirmyrat Gazakow	FC Energetik	9
5	Mihail Titow	FC Altyn Asyr	8

=== Scoring ===
- First goalscorer: Baýramgeldi Gulmaýew (Köpetdag)
