= 2015 Ýokary Liga =

Ýokary Liga
- Season: 2015
- Champions: Altyn Asyr
- Relegated: Hazyna
- AFC Cup: Altyn Asyr; Balkan
- Matches: 180
- Goals: 526 (2.92 per match)
- Top goalscorer: Myrat Ýagşyýew (31)

2015 Ýokary Liga season was the 23rd edition of the top tier professional Yokary Liga football annual competition in Turkmenistan administered by the Football Federation of Turkmenistan. It began on 5 March 2015 with the first round and ended in November 2015.

== Teams ==
Location of teams in the 2015 Ýokary Liga

Club	Location	Stadium	Capacity	Coach
Ahal	Ahal Province	Ashgabat Stadium	20,000	(Turkmenistan) Guwançmuhammet Öwekow (Turkmenistan) Boris Grigorýants
Altyn Asyr	Ashgabat	Ashgabat Stadium	20,000	(Turkmenistan) Ýazguly Hojageldiýew
Aşgabat	Ashgabat	Ashgabat Stadium	20,000	(Turkmenistan) Amanklyç Koçumow (Turkmenistan) Tofik Şukurow
Balkan	Balkanabat	Sport Toplumy Stadium	10,000	(Turkmenistan) Ali Gurbani
Daşoguz	Daşoguz	Sport Toplumy Stadium	10,000	(Turkmenistan) Ilgiz Abdyrahmanow
Hazyna	Ashgabat	TSIEM Stadium	1,000	(Turkmenistan) Ahmet Agamyradow
HTTU Aşgabat	Ashgabat	HTTU Stadium	1,000	(Turkmenistan) Röwşen Meredow
Energetik	Mary	Baýramaly sport desgasy	3000	(Turkmenistan) Rahym Gurbanmämmedow
Merw	Mary	Sport Toplumy Stadium	10,000	(Turkmenistan) Magtym Begenjow
Şagadam	Türkmenbaşy	Şagadam Stadium	5,000	(Turkmenistan) Rejepmyrat Agabaýew

== League table ==
Pos	Team	Pld	W	D	L	GF	GA	GD	Pts	Qualification or relegation
1	Altyn Asyr (C, Q)	36	29	5	2	81	21	+60	92	Qualifies for the 2016 AFC Cup Group Stage
2	Balkan (Q)	36	20	8	8	75	36	+39	68	Qualifies for the 2016 AFC Play-off Stage
3	Aşgabat	36	18	5	13	57	42	+15	59	
4	Şagadam	36	16	10	10	59	36	+23	58	
5	Ahal	36	16	10	10	67	54	+13	58	
6	HTTU	36	12	10	14	50	54	−4	46	
7	Hazyna (R)	36	12	8	16	54	52	+2	44	Relegation to the 2016 Birinji Ligasy
8	Merw	36	11	9	16	39	50	−11	42	
9	Energetik	36	5	10	21	27	74	−47	25	
10	Daşoguz	36	3	3	30	16	106	−90	12	

Updated to match(es) played on 18 December 2015. Source: Ýokary Liga table
Rules for classification: 1) points; 2) goal difference; 3) number of goals scored.
(C) Champions; (Q) Qualified for the phase indicated; (R) Relegated

== Results ==
=== Games 1–18 ===
Home \ Away	AHA	ALT	ASH	BAL	DAS	ENG	HAZ	HTT	MER	SAG
Ahal		0–1	1–0	3–1	4–0	6–0	3–2	0–1	1–1	1–1
Altyn Asyr	1–1		1–0	2–1	4–0	4–0	2–0	4–1	2–2	1–2
Aşgabat	1–3	0–1		2–0	3–0	4–1	0–1	4–1	1–0	2–1
Balkan	4–1	1–3	1–0		8–0	3–0	4–0	4–0	3–2	1–1
Daşoguz	1–4	0–4	0–3	0–6		1–1	2–1	0–3	0–1	0–4
Energetik	1–1	1–4	1–2	1–1	2–0		0–2	3–1	0–0	2–3
Hazyna	0–0	1–2	1–1	1–2	4–0	4–1		1–1	2–1	2–1
HTTU	2–3	0–2	0–4	1–0	1–0	0–0	2–0		1–0	1–2
Merw	2–3	0–3	2–1	1–1	2–0	1–1	2–1	1–1		1–0
Şagadam	1–1	0–0	1–0	2–2	5–2	3–0	1–2	1–2	2–0	

Updated to match(es) played on 4 December 2015. Source:
- Ýokary Liga match
- Ýokary Liga results
Legend: Blue = home team win; Yellow = draw; Red = away team win.

=== Games 19–36 ===
Home \ Away	AHA	ALT	ASH	BAL	DAS	ENG	HAZ	HTT	MER	SAG
Ahal		0–2	2–5	1–4		2–0	3–3	2–2	1–0	1–3
Altyn Asyr	1–1		2–1	1–0	3–0		3–1	0–2	2–1	1–1
Aşgabat	3–0	1–2		3–3	3–1	1–0	1–1	1–0	3–0	1–1
Balkan	3–2	0–2	2–1		0–0	4–0	2–0	1–1	4–0	1–2
Daşoguz	2–1	0–5	0–1	0–0		1–1	0–1	1–0	1–2	0–2
Energetik	1–5	0–3	0–0	0–2	2–1		2–0	2–1	1–2	1–3
Hazyna	3–3	1–2	6–1	2–3	3–0	4–1			2–0	0–0
HTTU	1–1	2–5	4–3	1–2	10–0	1–1	0–0		2–1	1–0
Merw	0–1	0–2	1–2		2–1	2–0	4–1	2–2		2–1
Şagadam	2–0	0–1		0–1	5–0	1–1	3–2	3–1	1–1	

Updated to match(es) played on 18 December 2015. Source:
- Ýokary Liga match
- Ýokary Liga results
Legend: Blue = home team win; Yellow = draw; Red = away team win.

== Top scorers ==
=== Hat-tricks ===
Player	For	Against	Result	Date
(Turkmenistan) Altymyrat Annadurdyýew^{4}	Ahal	Energetik	6–0	6 March 2015
(Turkmenistan) Myrat Ýagşyýew^{4}	Balkan	Hazyna	4–0	16 May 2015
(Turkmenistan) Altymyrat Annadurdyýew	Ahal	Aşgabat	3–1	4 July 2015
(Turkmenistan) Begli Meredow	Ahal	Daşoguz	4–0	8 July 2015
(Turkmenistan) Berdi Şamyradow	Ashgabat	Ahal	5–3	26 September 2015

- ^{4} Player scored 4 goals

== See also ==
- 2015 Turkmenistan Cup
- 2015 Turkmenistan First League
