= 2011 Turkmenistan Cup =

Football competition

The 2011 Turkmenistan Cup is 19th since independence of the Turkmen national football cup.

== Quarterfinals ==
The quarterfinal involves 8 best teams of previous regular season.

Team 1	Agg.	Team 2	1st leg	2nd leg
FC Balkan	1 – 2	FC Lebap	0 – 1	1 – 1
FC Aşgabat	2 – 3	FC Altyn Asyr	1 – 1	2 – 1
HTTU Aşgabat	3 – 3 (4 – 2p)	FC Şagadam	2 – 1	1 – 2
FC Merw	9 – 1	FC Ahal	4 – 0	5 – 1

=== First leg ===
2 August 2011

FC Balkan	0–1	FC Lebap
		Şermetow 29'

Balkanabat Stadium, Balkanabat

2 August 2011

FC Aşgabat	1–1	FC Altyn Asyr
Ataýew 60'		Gazakow 55'

Nisa-Çandybil Stadium, Ashgabat

2 August 2011

HTTU Aşgabat	2–1	FC Şagadam
Çaňkaýew 11'; Garadanow 90+2'		Boliýan 58'

HTTU Stadium, Ashgabat

2 August 2011

FC Merw	4–0	FC Ahal
Orazmuhammedow 3'; Gurbanmuhammedow 4', 48'; Soltanow 90'

Mary Stadium, Mary

==== Second leg ====
8 August 2011

FC Lebap	1–1	FC Balkan
Şermetow 32'		Öwekow 80'

Türkmenabat Stadium, Türkmenabat

FC Lebap won 2–1 on aggregate.

8 August 2011

FC Altyn Asyr	1–2	FC Aşgabat
Ataýew 53'		Orazow 28'; Ataýew 33'

,

FC Aşgabat won 3–2 on aggregate.

8 August 2011

FC Şagadam	2–1	HTTU Aşgabat
Iwanow 11'; Çaplygin 22'		Söýünow 45+1'
Penalties
Saparow (penalty scored); Annaberdiýew (penalty scored)	2–4	(penalty scored) Garadanow; (penalty scored) Hangeldiýew; (penalty scored) Çoňkaýew; (penalty scored) Ataýew

Türkmenbaşy Stadium, Türkmenbaşy

Şagadam 3–3 HTTU on aggregate. HTTU won 4–2 on penalties.

8 August 2011

FC Ahal	1–5	FC Merw
Rejepow 74'		Orazmuhammedow 14'; Soltanow 20', 79'; Gurbanmuhhammedow 52', 80'

Ahal Stadium, Abadan

FC Merw won 9–1 on aggregate.

== Semifinals ==
Team 1	Agg.	Team 2	1st leg	2nd leg
FC Lebap	2 – 2 (a)	FC Aşgabat	2 – 1	0 – 1
HTTU Aşgabat	2 – 2 (a)	FC Merw	0 – 1	2 – 1

=== First leg ===
19 November 2011

FC Lebap	2–1	FC Aşgabat

Türkmenabat Stadium, Türkmenabat

19 November 2011

HTTU Aşgabat	0–1	FC Merw

HTTU Stadium, Ashgabat

==== Second leg ====
23 November 2011

FC Aşgabat	1–0	FC Lebap

Nisa-Çandybil Stadium, Ashgabat

FC Aşgabat won 2–2 on away goals.

23 November 2011

FC Merw	1–2	HTTU Aşgabat

Mary Stadium, Mary

HTTU Aşgabat won 2–2 on away goals.

== Final ==
30 November 2011

FC Aşgabat	0–0	HTTU Aşgabat
Penalties
Orazow (penalty missed); Tagaýew (penalty scored); Urazow (penalty scored); Şamyradow (penalty missed)	2–4	(penalty missed) Ataýew; (penalty scored) Kömekow; (penalty scored) Annamämmedow; (penalty scored) Hangeldiýew

Ahal Stadium, Abadan, Turkmenistan
Referee: Kakamyrat Seýidow

== See also ==
- 2011 Ýokary Liga
