= 2026 Ýokary Liga =

Ýokary Liga
- Season: 2026
- Dates: 4 April –
- Champions: Arkadag
- AFC Champions League Two: Arkadag
- Matches: 89
- Goals: 301 (3.38 per match)
- Biggest home win: Arkadag 7–0 Merw (6 August 2026)
- Biggest away win: Merw 0–7 Arkadag (16 May 2026)
- Highest scoring: Arkadag 7–1 Merw (5 April 2026); Köpetdag 1–7 Arkadag (10 May 2026); Altyn Asyr 3–5 Köpetdag (20 May 2026); Aşgabat 1–7 Arkadag
- Longest winning run: Arkadag (25)
- Longest unbeaten run: Arkadag (24)
- Longest winless run: Şagadam (13)
- Longest losing run: Merw (6)
- All statistics correct as of 11 October 2026.

The 2026 Ýokary Liga is the 34th edition of the top tier professional Yokary Liga football annual competition in Turkmenistan administered by the Football Federation of Turkmenistan. FK Arkadag entered the season as the three-time defending champions, having won their 3rd consecutive league title in the previous season.

== Season events ==
Prior to the start of the league season, it was announced that eight teams would participate in the season, beginning on 4 April.

For the first time, the Yokary Liga features a dedicated logo that blends sporting energy with national heritage. The emblem showcases a golden Akhal-Teke horse—a symbol of speed and nobility—set against a deep green backdrop. The design is anchored by a football and five traditional carpet göls, representing the cultural unity of the nation.

Following their 4-0 win over Ahal on 28 September, Arkadag were crowned Ýokary Liga champions for the fourth season in a row.

== Teams ==
Locations of teams in the 2026 Ýokary Liga

Team	Location	Venue	Capacity
Arkadag	Arkadag	Nusaý Stadium; Arkadag Stadium	3,000; 10,000
Ahal	Anau (Ahal Region)	Ashgabat Stadium; Babarap Sport Complex	20,000; 1,000
Altyn Asyr	Ashgabat	Buzmeyin Sport Complex	10,000
Aşgabat	Ashgabat	Ashgabat Stadium; Babarap Sport Complex	20,000; 1,000
Nebitçi	Balkanabat (Balkan Region)	Balkanabat Sport Complex	10,000
Köpetdag	Ashgabat	Köpetdag Stadium	26,000
Merw	Mary (Mary Region)	Mary Sport Complex	10,000
Şagadam	Türkmenbaşy (Balkan Region)	Şagadam Stadium; Balkanabat Sport Complex	1,500; 10,000

== Personnel and sponsoring ==
Team	Manager/Head coach	Captain	Kit manufacturer	Sponsor
Arkadag	(Turkmenistan) Wladimir Baýramow	(Turkmenistan) Abdy Bäşimow	Jako	Arkadag City
Ahal	(Turkmenistan) Eziz Annamukhammedov	(Turkmenistan) Elman Tagaýew	Kelme	Türkmennebit
Altyn Asyr	(Turkmenistan) Ýazguly Hojageldiýew	(Turkmenistan) Zafar Babajanow	Adidas	TM CELL
Aşgabat	(Turkmenistan) Tofik Shukurov		Kelme	Ashgabat City
Nebitçi	(Turkmenistan) Aleksandr Klimenko	Wezirgeldi Ylýasow	Joma	Sinopec
Köpetdag	(Turkmenistan) Berdy Khotdyev		Kelme	
Merw	(Turkmenistan) Rakhmanguly Baylev		Jako	Türkmengaz
Şagadam	(Turkmenistan) Maksatmyrat Şamyradow		Kelme	Yug-Neftegaz Private Limited / Turkmenbashi Complex of Oil Refineries

== Coaching changes ==
Team	Outgoing coach	Manner of departure	Date of vacancy	Position in table	Incoming coach	Date of appointment	Ref.
Ahal	Welsähet Öwezow		Pre-Season	Pre-Season	Eziz Annamukhammedov	Pre-Season	
Merw	Jemşit Orazmuhammedow		Pre-Season	Pre-Season	Rakhmanguly Baylev	Pre-Season	
Şagadam	Ali Gurbani		Pre-Season	Pre-Season	Maksatmyrat Şamyradow	Pre-Season	

== Regular season ==
=== League table ===
Pos	Team	Pld	W	D	L	GF	GA	GD	Pts	Qualification or relegation
1	Arkadag (C)	25	25	0	0	101	12	+89	75	Qualification for AFC Champions League Two Playoffs
2	Altyn Asyr	24	17	2	5	51	29	+22	53	Qualification for the Silk Way Cup group stage
3	Ahal	23	14	3	6	52	28	+24	45	Qualification for the Silk Way Cup qualifying round
4	Şagadam	24	7	4	13	22	39	−17	25	
5	Nebitçi	25	7	4	14	23	43	−20	25	
6	Aşgabat	24	6	3	15	30	52	−22	21	
7	Merw	24	5	3	16	23	68	−45	18	
8	Köpetdag	25	4	5	16	25	56	−31	17	

Updated to match(es) played on 1 November 2026. Source: TFF
Rules for classification: 1) Points; 2) Head-to-head points; 3) Head-to-head goal difference; 4) Head-to-head goals scored; 5) Goal difference; 6) Goals scored.
(C) Champions

=== Results ===
Home \ Away	AHA	ALT	ARK	ASG	KOP	MER	NEB	SAG
Ahal		0–0	0–4	4–3	5–1	2–2	1–0	1–0
Ahal		0–2	0–4		3–0	4–0	3–0	
Altyn Asyr	3–3		0–1	4–1	3–5	2–0	4–2	2–0
Altyn Asyr			2–5	2–1				2–0
Arkadag	1–0	5–0		3–0	3–0	7–1	4–1	3–2
Arkadag	2–1			3–0	5–0	7–0		4–0
Aşgabat	0–3	0–1	1–7		1–1	5–1	1–0	1–3
Aşgabat	2–5	0–4			1–1			1–0
Köpetdag	0–4	0–3	1–7	3–1		2–0	0–1	0–0
Köpetdag		1–2	0–1				2–2	
Merw	1–3	0–2	0–7	2–1	2–1		4–1	2–0
Merw			0–5	3–2	0–0		0–1	
Nebitçi	0–4	0–2	0–2	1–0	1–0	2–1		0–0
Nebitçi		1–3	2–4	1–1				2–1
Şagadam	1–3	0–2	1–4	0–2	2–0	1–1	1–0	
Şagadam	2–1		0–3		3–2	2–1	1–1	

Updated to match(es) played on 11 October 2026. Source: Soccerway
Legend: Blue = home team win; Yellow = draw; Red = away team win.

=== Results by round ===
Team ╲ Round	1	2	3	4	5	6	7	8	9	10	11	12	13	14	15	16	17	18	19	20	21	22	23	24	25	26	27	28
Arkadag	W	W	W	W	W	W	W	W	W	W	W	W	W	W	W	W	W	W	W	W	W	W	W		W			W
Altyn Asyr	W	W	L	D	W	W	W	W	L	L	D	W	W	W	W	W	L	W		W	W	W						
Ahal	W	L	D	D	W	W	W	W	L	W	D	W	W	W	W	L	W	L	L	W	W		L					
Aşgabat	L	L	L	L	D	L	L	L	W	W	W	L	L	L	L	W	D	L	D	L	L	L						
Köpetdag	L	L	L	L	D	L	L	L	W	D	L	W	W	L	L	L	L	D	D	D	L							L
Merw	L	W	D	W	L	W	D	L	L	L	L	L	L	W	L	L	L	W		D	L	L						
Nebitçi	L	L	W	W	L	L	L	D	W	L	W	L	L	L	D	W	D	D	L	L	L	W						
Şagadam	W	W	W	L	L	L	D	D	L	D	L	L	L	L	D	L	W	L	W	L	W	L			L			

Updated to match(es) played on 11 October 2026. Source:
W = Win; D = Draw; L = Loss

== Season statistics ==
=== Top scorers ===
As of matches played 11 October 2026

Rank	Player	Team	Goals
1	(Turkmenistan) Didar Durdyýew	Arkadag	22
2	(Turkmenistan) Suleiman Mirzoev	Ahal	10
3	(Turkmenistan) Arslan Saparov	Köpetdag	9
3	(Turkmenistan) Rovshegeldy Halmamedov	Altyn Asyr	9
5	(Turkmenistan) Meýlis Durdyýew	Arkadag	8
5	(Turkmenistan) Merdan Mukhadov	Aşgabat	8
5	(Turkmenistan) Magtymberdi Berenov	Ahal	8
5	(Turkmenistan) Byashim Gurbanberdiev	Ahal	8
5	(Turkmenistan) Resul Hojaýew	Arkadag	8
10	(Turkmenistan) Yakupmuhammet Govshudov	Ahal	7
10	(Turkmenistan) Rahman Myratberdiýew	Arkadag	7
10	(Turkmenistan) Begenç Akmämmedow	Arkadag	7
13	(Turkmenistan) Serdar Guliyev	Şagadam	6
14	(Turkmenistan) Mekan Yazmuradov	Merw	5
14	(Turkmenistan) Bayram Ataev	Arkadag	5
14	(Turkmenistan) Myrat Annaev	Altyn Asyr	5
17	(Turkmenistan) Mekan Ashyrov	Altyn Asyr	4
17	(Turkmenistan) Şamämmet Hydyrow	Arkadag	4
17	(Turkmenistan) Avdyresul Abdyev	Merw	4
17	(Turkmenistan) Begenchmurad Muradov	Altyn Asyr	4
17	(Turkmenistan) Emir Berdyev	Köpetdag	4
17	(Turkmenistan) Abdy Bäşimow	Arkadag	4
17	(Turkmenistan) Altymyrat Annadurdyýew	Arkadag	4
17	(Turkmenistan) Ahmet Ataýew	Arkadag	4
17	(Turkmenistan) Bagtiyar Gurgenov	Altyn Asyr	4
26	(Turkmenistan) Begench Mamiev	Nebitçi	3
26	(Turkmenistan) Guvanch Berdimuradov	Merw	3
26	(Turkmenistan) Nazar Tovakelov	Ahal	3
26	(Turkmenistan) Dayanch Meredov	Arkadag	3
26	(Turkmenistan) Pirmyrat Sultanov	Aşgabat	3
26	(Turkmenistan) Oraz Orazov	Ahal	3
26	(Turkmenistan) Serdar Tukiev	Nebitçi	3
26	(Turkmenistan) Yakhshysahed Dovletgeldyev	Şagadam	3
26	(Turkmenistan) Mekan Amaniyazov	Köpetdag	3
26	(Turkmenistan) Nurulla Raimbaev	Aşgabat	3
26	(Turkmenistan) Arzuwguly Sapargulýyew	Arkadag	3
26	(Turkmenistan) Ykhlas Toyjanov	Arkadag	3
26	(Turkmenistan) Ikhlas Makhtymov	Şagadam	3
26	(Turkmenistan) Enver Annaev	Ahal	3
26	(Turkmenistan) Mekan Saparow	Arkadag	3
26	(Turkmenistan) Abdyrakhman Annamyradov	Altyn Asyr	3
42	(Turkmenistan) Islam Annamuradov	Ahal	2
42	(Turkmenistan) Mirza Beknazarow	Arkadag	2
42	(Turkmenistan) Yazgylyç Gurbanow	Arkadag	2
42	(Turkmenistan) Güýçmyrat Annagulyýew	Arkadag	2
42	(Turkmenistan) Bayramgeldy Gulmaev	Köpetdag	2
42	(Turkmenistan) Ilýas Çaryýew	Arkadag	2
42	(Turkmenistan) Ruslan Priev	Ahal	2
42	(Turkmenistan) Batyr Ashirov	Köpetdag	2
42	(Turkmenistan) Begmyrat Bayov	Altyn Asyr	2
42	(Turkmenistan) Khakmukhamed Bashimov	Ahal	2
42	(Turkmenistan) Welmyrat Ballakow	Arkadag	2
42	(Turkmenistan) Salim Umarov	Merw	2
42	(Turkmenistan) Akmammet Metdaev	Nebitçi	2
42	(Turkmenistan) Khydyr Agoyliev	Nebitçi	2
42	(Turkmenistan) Şanazar Tirkişow	Arkadag	2
42	(Turkmenistan) Davran Khojamammedov	Ahal	2
42	(Turkmenistan) Yazgylych Gurbanov	Arkadag	2
42	(Turkmenistan) Zafar Babajanov	Altyn Asyr	2
42	(Turkmenistan) Sokhbet Durdyev	Altyn Asyr	2
42	(Turkmenistan) Mekan Ashirov	Altyn Asyr	2
62	(Turkmenistan) Sokhbet Allanurov	Şagadam	1
62	(Turkmenistan) Khoshgeldy Khojovov	Altyn Asyr	1
62	(Turkmenistan) Vakhyd Orazsakhadov	Aşgabat	1
62	(Turkmenistan) Ali Khaidarov	Merw	1
62	(Turkmenistan) Arslan Urazov	Şagadam	1
62	(Turkmenistan) Mukam Nazyev	Merw	1
62	(Turkmenistan) Didar Didarov	Aşgabat	1
62	(Turkmenistan) Kemal Annamuhammedov	Merw	1
62	(Turkmenistan) Maksat Chagbalyev	Merw	1
62	(Turkmenistan) Ezizhmammet Orazmammedov	Merw	1
62	(Turkmenistan) Seyitmammet Khojamammedov	Nebitçi	1
62	(Turkmenistan) Guvanch Valiev	Şagadam	1
62	(Turkmenistan) Shatlyk Gurbanov	Aşgabat	1
62	(Turkmenistan) Elyas Agoyliev	Nebitçi	1
62	(Turkmenistan) Garly Garlyev	Aşgabat	1
62	(Turkmenistan) Shokhrat Ovmadov	Merw	1
62	(Turkmenistan) Abdymuhammet Begjanov	Nebitçi	1
62	(Turkmenistan) Shikhdurdy Amandurdiev	Aşgabat	1
62	(Turkmenistan) Agageldi Tachmammedov	Aşgabat	1
62	(Turkmenistan) Yolmammet Karadzhaev	Ahal	1
62	(Turkmenistan) Elyas Akiyev	Şagadam	1
62	(Turkmenistan) Mukam Nazziev	Merw	1
62	(Turkmenistan) Orazali Begnazarov	Aşgabat	1
62	(Turkmenistan) Mergen Nurlyev	Aşgabat	1
62	(Turkmenistan) Mukhammet Annaev	Nebitçi	1
62	(Turkmenistan) Musa Nurnazarov	Şagadam	1
62	(Turkmenistan) Begenchmyrat Myradov	Altyn Asyr	1
62	(Turkmenistan) Ykhlas Toydzhanov	Arkadag	1
62	(Turkmenistan) Tirkishmyrat Sarymyradov	Aşgabat	1
62	(Turkmenistan) Bayramgeldy Nurlyev	Nebitçi	1
62	(Turkmenistan) Veisgeldy Orazdurdyev	Altyn Asyr	1
62	(Turkmenistan) Gurbanguly Garayev	Şagadam	1
62	(Turkmenistan) Suleyman Mukhadov	Merw	1
62	(Turkmenistan) Serdar Gulyev	Şagadam	1
62	(Turkmenistan) Bayramgeldi Nurlyev	Nebitçi	1
62	(Turkmenistan) Dayanch Nurlyev	Nebitçi	1
62	(Turkmenistan) Rovshegeldi Halmammedov	Altyn Asyr	1

=== Own goals ===
- (Turkmenistan) Shatlyk Gurbanov - Altyn Asyr vs Aşgabat (5 April 2026)
- (Turkmenistan) Sokhbet Allanurov - Aşgabat vs Şagadam (11 April 2026)
- (Turkmenistan) Vakhit Vakhidov - Köpetdag vs Arkadag (10 May 2026)
- (Turkmenistan) Bayramgeldi Gulmaev - Köpetdag vs Altyn Asyr (15 August 2026)

=== Hat-tricks ===
Player	For	Against	Result	Date	Ref
(Turkmenistan) Didar Durdyýew	Arkadag	Merw	0–7 (A)	16 May 2026	
(Turkmenistan) Arslan Saparov	Köpetdag	Altyn Asyr	3–5 (A)	20 May 2026	
(Turkmenistan) Pirmyrat Sultanov	Aşgabat	Merw	5–1 (H)	30 May 2026	
(Turkmenistan) Didar Durdyýew	Arkadag	Altyn Asyr	2–5 (A)	22 August 2026	
(Turkmenistan) Didar Durdyýew^{4}	Arkadag	Altyn Asyr	2–4 (A)	4 September 2026	

Notes

- ^{4} Player scored 4 goals

=== Discipline ===
==== Red cards ====
As of match played 11 October 2026

- (Turkmenistan) Ruslan Priyev – Ahal vs Köpetdag (4 April 2026)
- (Turkmenistan) Vezirgeldy Ilyasov – Merw vs Nebitçi (11 April 2026)
- (Turkmenistan) Azizbek Bekchanov – Aşgabat vs Şagadam (11 April 2026)
- (Turkmenistan) Musaguli Zordzhanov – Köpetdag vs Altyn Asyr (11 April 2026)
- (Turkmenistan) Begench Gylychnyyazov – Şagadam vs Ahal (26 April 2026)
- (Turkmenistan) Toily Batyrov – Altyn Asyr vs Şagadam (3 May 2026)
- (Turkmenistan) Galabeg Dzhumamyradov – Köpetdag vs Ahal (16 May 2026)
- (Turkmenistan) Bezirgen Purliev – Altyn Asyr vs Ahal (31 May 2026)
- (Turkmenistan) Kemal Annamukhammedov – Merw vs Şagadam (20 June 2026)
- (Turkmenistan) Azizbek Bekchanov – Merw vs Şagadam (20 June 2026)
- (Turkmenistan) Mukhammet Annaev – Şagadam vs Nebitçi (7 August 2026)
- (Turkmenistan) Zafar Babajanov – Ahal vs Altyn Asyr (7 October 2026)
- (Turkmenistan) Islam Annamuradov – Ahal vs Altyn Asyr (7 October 2026)

== See also ==
- 2026 Turkmenistan Cup
