= 2026 Turkmenistan Cup =

Türkmenistanyň Kubogy 2026

Tournament details
- Country: Turkmenistan
- Dates: 6 May -
- Teams: 8

Tournament statistics
- Matches played: 10
- Goals scored: 50 (5 per match)
- All statistics correct as of 9 September 2026.

The 2026 Turkmenistan Cup (Turkmen: Türkmenistanyň Kubogy 2026) is the 33rd season of the Turkmenistan Cup knockout tournament. 8 Ýokary Liga clubs entered the competition, which began with the quarter-final round on 6 May 2026. The tournament is organized by the Football Federation of Turkmenistan.

The tournament winner will earn a spot in the 2027–28 AFC Challenge League and the 2026 Turkmenistan Super Cup.

== Bracket ==
The eight teams of the 2026 Ýokary Liga entered the competition, with the draw taking place in April.

Quarter-finals
Arkadag	7	5	12
Merw	0	0	0
Şagadam	0	2	2
Köpetdag	1	2	3
Ahal	4	5	9
Nebitçi	2	2	4
Altyn Asyr	6	3	9
Aşgabat	1	0	1

Semi-finals
Köpetdag	1
Ahal	5
Altyn Asyr	1
Arkadag	3

Final

== Quarter-finals ==
The first leg was held on 6 May 2026, while the second leg was held on 24 June 2026.

6 May 2026	Arkadag	7–0	Merw	Ashgabat
(UTC+5)	Ballakov 6'; Ataev 11'; Durdyýew 15' (pen.); Gurbanov 49', 58'; Ataýew 51'; Akmammedov 80'	Report		Stadium: Nusaý Stadium

24 June 2026	Merw	0–5 (0–12 agg.)	Arkadag	Mary
18:15 (UTC+5)		Report	Akmammedov 17'; Durdyýew 21'; Meredov 38'; Ataev 56'; Urazov 62'	Stadium: Sport toplumy Referee: A. Goshshanov

6 May 2026	Şagadam	0–1	Köpetdag	Türkmenbaşy
(UTC+5)	Gulyev (yellow card) 68' (yellow-red card) 75'	Report	Berdyev 54'	Stadium: Şagadam Stadium; Referee: A. Goshshanov

24 June 2026	Köpetdag	2–2 (3–2 agg.)	Şagadam	Ashgabat
18:30 (UTC+5)	Berdyev 22'; Zorjikov 77'	Report	Valiev 43'; Makhmydov 61'	Stadium: Köpetdag Stadium; Referee: A. Begnazarov

6 May 2026	Ahal	4–2	Nebitçi	Ashgabat
(UTC+5)	Mirzoev 3', 29' (pen.); Berenov 85'; Khojamammedov 90+1'	Report	Bayramov 36'; Agoyliev 90+2'	Stadium: Ashgabat Stadium

24 June 2026	Nebitçi	2–5 (4–9 agg.)	Ahal	Balkanabat
18:45 (UTC+5)	Khojamammedov 48'; Agoyliev 89'	Report	Mirzoev 3', 11'; Berenov 40', 69'; Govshudov 58'	Stadium: Sport toplumy Referee: N. Karadzhaev

6 May 2026	Altyn Asyr	6–1	Aşgabat	Ashgabat
(UTC+5)	Muradov 7', 29', 77'; Halmammedov 37'; Ashirov 61'; Rovshenmyradov 81'	Report	Didarov 64'	Stadium: Buzmeyin Sport Complex

24 June 2026	Aşgabat	0–3 (1–9 agg.)	Altyn Asyr	Ashgabat
18:30 (UTC+5)		Report	Gurgenov 10'; Orazdurdyev 39'; Ovezmyradov 48'	Stadium: Nusaý Stadium; Referee: E. Yazmyradov

== Semi-finals ==
9 September 2026	Köpetdag	1–5	Ahal	Ashgabat
17:30 (UTC+5)	Berdyev 24'	Report	Tovakelov 47' (pen.); Govshudov 60'; Mirzoev 72'; Annamyradov 79'; Meredov 83'}	Stadium: Köpetdag Stadium; Referee: R. Mamedov

	Ahal	v	Köpetdag
(UTC+5)

9 September 2026	Altyn Asyr	1–3	Arkadag	Ashgabat
17:30 (UTC+5)	Babajanow (yellow card) 20' (yellow-red card) 84'; Halmammedov 54'	Report	Saparow 8'; Gurbanov 65'; Meredov 84'	Stadium: Buzmeyin Sport Complex; Referee: E. Yazmyradov

	Arkadag	v	Altyn Asyr
(UTC+5)

== Goal scorers ==
As of match played 9 September 2026

Rank	Player	Club	Goals
1	(Turkmenistan) Suleiman Mirzoev	Ahal	5
2	(Turkmenistan) Begenchmyrat Muradov	Altyn Asyr	3
2	(Turkmenistan) Magtymberdi Berenov	Ahal	3
2	(Turkmenistan) Emir Berdyev	Köpetdag	3
2	(Turkmenistan) Yazgylych Gurbanov	Arkadag	3
6	(Turkmenistan) Begench Akmammedov	Arkadag	2
6	(Turkmenistan) Didar Durdyýew	Arkadag	2
6	(Turkmenistan) Bayram Ataev	Arkadag	2
6	(Turkmenistan) Khydyr Agoyliev	Nebitçi	2
6	(Turkmenistan) Yakupmuhammet Govshudov	Ahal	2
6	(Turkmenistan) Rovshegeldi Halmammedov	Altyn Asyr	2
6	(Turkmenistan) Dayanch Meredov	Arkadag	2
13	(Turkmenistan) Velmyrat Ballakov	Arkadag	1
13	(Turkmenistan) Ahmet Ataýew	Arkadag	1
13	(Turkmenistan) Dovran Khojamammedov	Ahal	1
13	(Turkmenistan) Myratdurdy Bayramov	Nebitçi	1
13	(Turkmenistan) Mekan Ashirov	Altyn Asyr	1
13	(Turkmenistan) Resul Rovshenmyradov	Altyn Asyr	1
13	(Turkmenistan) Didar Didarov	Aşgabat	1
13	(Turkmenistan) Diyargylych Urazov	Arkadag	1
13	(Turkmenistan) Musaguly Zorjikov	Köpetdag	1
13	(Turkmenistan) Guvanch Valiev	Şagadam	1
13	(Turkmenistan) Resul Makhmydov	Şagadam	1
13	(Turkmenistan) Seyitmammet Khojamammedov	Nebitçi	1
13	(Turkmenistan) Bakhtiyar Gurgenov	Altyn Asyr	1
13	(Turkmenistan) Veisgeldi Orazdurdyev	Altyn Asyr	1
13	(Turkmenistan) Myrat Ovezmyradov	Altyn Asyr	1
13	(Turkmenistan) Nazar Tovakelov	Ahal	1
13	(Turkmenistan) Islam Annamyradov	Ahal	1
13	(Turkmenistan) Annamyrat Meredov	Ahal	1
13	(Turkmenistan) Mekan Saparow	Arkadag	1

== See also ==
- 2026 Ýokary Liga
