= 2013 Turkmenistan Cup =

Tournament details
- Country: Turkmenistan
- Teams: 10

Final positions
- Champions: FC Ahal
- Runners-up: FC Altyn Asyr

The 2013 Turkmenistan Cup was the 22nd season of the Turkmenistan Cup knockout tournament. Performed by the system of leaving since the quarterfinals, except commands FC Daşoguz, FC Lebap and FC Ashgabat, they began the tournament with a preliminary stage. The preliminary stage of the tournament was launched August 1, 2013. The final match was held October 28, 2013, in Turkmenabat between FC Altyn Asyr and FC Ahal. Cup won FC Ahal. The cup champion wins a spot in the 2014 Turkmenistan Supercup final.

== Final ==
28.10.2013
15:00

FC Ahal	2–1	FC Altyn Asyr
Ata Geldiýew; Serdaraly Ataýew	Report	Didar Durdyýew 12'

Sport toplumy, Turkmenabat
