= Baýramnyýaz Berdiýew =

Turkmen footballer

Bayramniyaz Berdiyev
Personal information
- Full name: Bayramnyýaz Berdiýew
- Date of birth: 13 September 1974 (age 52)
- Place of birth: Turkmen SSR, Soviet Union
- Position: Goalkeeper

Team information
- Current team: FC Ahal (head coach)

Senior career*
| Years | Team | Apps | (Gls) |
| –2000 | Nisa Aşgabat | ? | (?) |
| 2001–2004 | FC Esil Bogatyr | 76 | (0) |
| 2004 | Nebitçi Balkanabat | ? | (?) |
| 2005 | FC Ordabasy | 1 | (0) |
| 2006–2007 | Qyzylqum Zarashfan | 51 | (0) |
| 2008 | FC Aşgabat | | |
| 2008 | Shurtan | 1 | (-?) |
| 2009 | Navbahor Namangan | 16 | (-?) |

International career
| 2000–2007 | Turkmenistan | 28 | (-?) |

Managerial career
- 2017–2020: FC Ahal (goalkeeping coach)
- 2019: FC Ahal
- * Club domestic league appearances and goals as of 25 November 2007

Bayramnyýaz Berdiýew (born 13 September 1974) is a Turkmen football coach and a former player who played as a goalkeeper.

== Club career ==
Berdiýew made his senior football debut in the last season of the USSR Championship, playing in the 1991 Soviet Second League for FC Kopetdag and in the 1991 Soviet Second League B for FC Ahal.

After Turkmenistan gained independence, he continued to play for the clubs of the Ýokary Liga, including FC Turan Dashoguz, Nisa Aşgabat and again for FC Kopetdag. He became the champion and medalist of the national championship.

In 2001, he moved to the Kazakhstani Esil Bogatyr, where he spent three and a half seasons. In the first three he was the main goalkeeper. Bronze medalist of the 2001 Kazakhstan Premier League, he conceded only 11 goals in 25 matches that season. In total, he played 76 matches for the Kazakh club in the Kazakhstan Premier League and 9 in the Kazakhstan Cup.

Berdiýew again played in Turkmenistan and briefly moved to the Kazakhstani FC Ordabasy, where he played one match in the Kazakhstan Premier League and two games in the Kazakhstan Cup.

In the second half of the 2000s, he played in Uzbekistan: in 2006-2007 he was the main goalkeeper of FC Qizilqum Zarafshon, and also played for Shurtan and Navbahor.

In the 2004 Ýokary Liga he became the champion with the Nebitçi FT and in 2008 Ýokary Liga with FC Aşgabat. In 2008, in the Turkmenistan SuperCup match against Şagadam FK, he saved three penalties and scored the decisive goal in the post-match series.

== International career ==
Since 2000, Berdiýew has played for the Turkmenistan national football team. His debut took place on October 8, 2000, against Uzbekistan, replacing Alexander Korobko in the 84th minute.

Baýramnyýaz Berdiýew participated in the 2004 Asian Cup in China, where he was the third goalkeeper and never entered the field.

He became a finalist in the 2010 AFC Challenge Cup, having played all five matches in the tournament. In total, he played 28 matches for the national team.

== Coaching career ==
In 2017–2020, he worked as a goalkeeper coach at the FC Ahal. In some matches, he acted as head coach.

At the end of the 2019 season, after the resignation of Amangylyç Koçumow, he acted as head coach. Under his leadership the club was a finalist in the Turkmenistan Cup.

== Honours ==
=== Club ===
Nisa Aşgabat

- Ýokary Liga: 1998–99
- Turkmenistan Cup: 1995, 1998

Nebitçi FT

- Ýokary Liga: 2004
- Turkmenistan Cup: 2004

=== International ===
AFC Challenge Cup

- Runners-up: 2010
