= 2015 AFC Cup =

12th secondary club football tournament organized by the

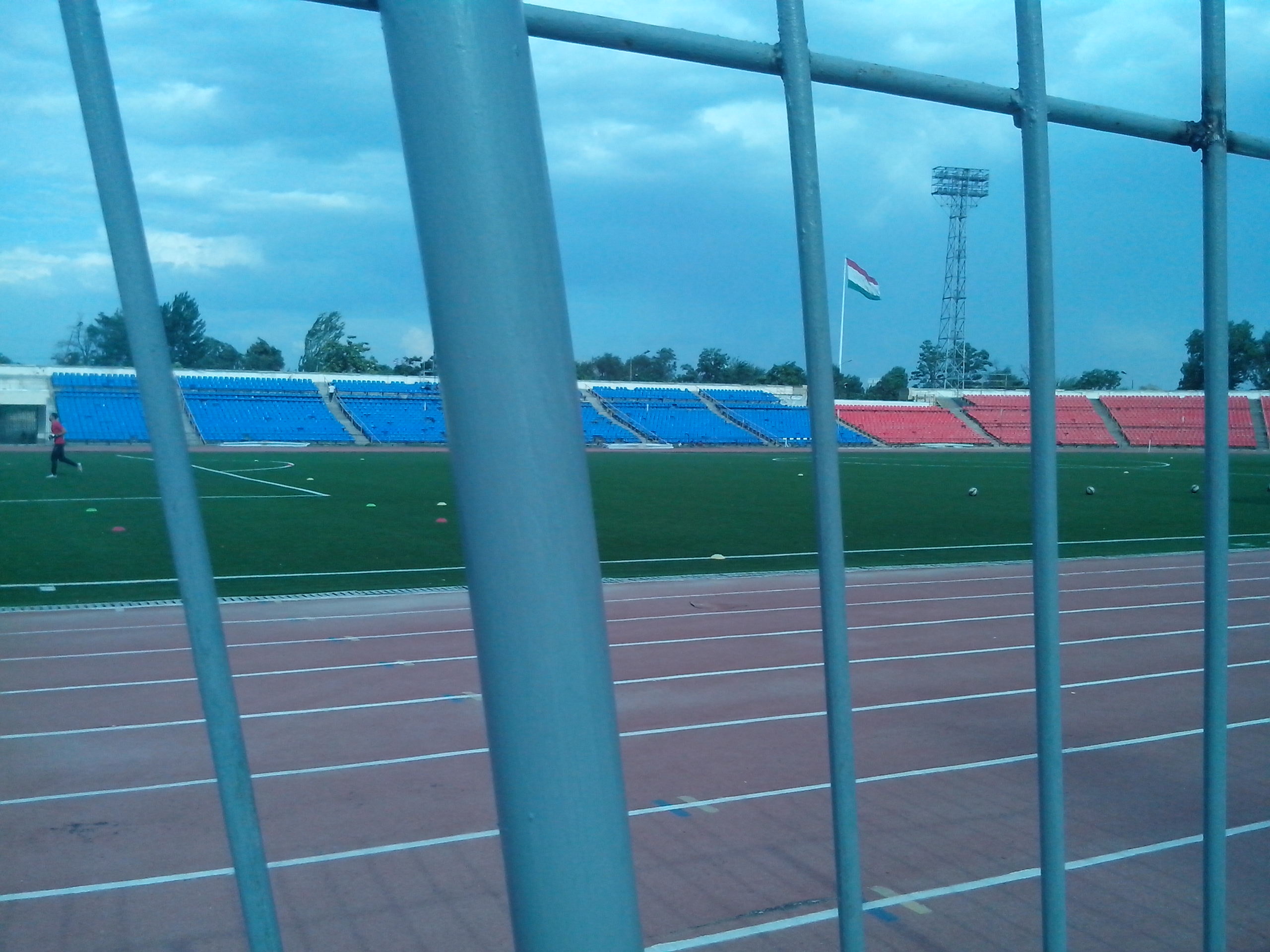
- The Pamir Stadium in Dushanbe hosted the final

Tournament details
- Dates: 9 February – 31 October 2015
- Teams: 41 (from 23 associations)

Final positions
- Champions: (Malaysia) Johor Darul Ta'zim (1st title)
- Runners-up: (Tajikistan) Istiklol

Tournament statistics
- Matches played: 122
- Goals scored: 339 (2.78 per match)
- Attendance: 496,305 (4,068 per match)
- Top scorer(s): (Australia) Daniel McBreen (North Macedonia) Riste Naumov (8 goals each)
- Best player: (Malaysia) Mohd Safiq Rahim

The 2015 AFC Cup was the 12th edition of the AFC Cup, Asia's secondary club football tournament organized by the Asian Football Confederation (AFC).

Johor Darul Ta'zim from Malaysia won the tournament after defeating Istiklol from Tajikistan in the final.

Al-Qadsia, the defending champions, were eliminated in the semi-finals after the Kuwait Football Association was suspended by FIFA.

== Association team allocation ==
The AFC Competitions Committee proposed a revamp of the AFC club competitions on 25 January 2014, which was ratified by the AFC Executive Committee on 16 April 2014. The member associations are ranked based on their national team's and clubs' performance over the last four years in AFC competitions, with the allocation of slots for the 2015 and 2016 editions of the AFC club competitions determined by the 2014 rankings:

- The top 24 member associations (MAs) as per the AFC rankings which do not receive direct slots in the AFC Champions League are eligible to participate in the AFC Cup group stage (including losers of the AFC Champions League qualifying play-off).
- The MAs ranked 25 to 32 are eligible to participate in the AFC Cup group stage, and the associations ranked 33 to 47 are eligible to participate in the AFC Cup qualifying play-off (including those of "emerging countries" which participated in the AFC President's Cup, whose last edition was in 2014).

The AFC Competitions Committee decided on the participation of member associations in the 2015 and 2016 editions of the AFC Cup on 28 November 2014.

Participation for 2015 AFC Cup
| Participating |
| Not participating |

West Zone
| Rank | | Member Association | Points | Slots | | | |
| Rank | | Member Association | Points | ACL Play-off | Group stage | Play-off | |
| Zone | All | Member Association | Points | ACL Play-off | Group stage | Play-off round | Prelim. round |
|---|---|---|---|---|---|---|---|
| 6 | 10 | Iraq | 47.106 | 0 | 2 | 0 | 0 |
| 7 | 11 | Kuwait | 45.423 | 1 | 1 | 0 | 0 |
| 8 | 12 | Jordan | 44.309 | 1 | 1 | 0 | 0 |
| 9 | 14 | Oman | 30.586 | 1 | 0 | 1 | 0 |
| 10 | 16 | Bahrain | 25.547 | 1 | 0 | 1 | 0 |
| 11 | 17 | Lebanon | 25.043 | 0 | 1 | 1 | 0 |
| 12 | 19 | Syria | 22.883 | 0 | 1 | 1 | 0 |
| 13 | 25 | Palestine | 15.911 | 0 | 1 | 1 ~~(0)~~ | 0 ~~(1)~~ |
| 14 | 28 | Tajikistan | 11.761 | 0 | 1 | 0 | 1 |
| 15 | 29 | Afghanistan | 11.464 | 0 | 0 | 0 | 0 |
| 16 | 30 | Turkmenistan | 10.554 | 0 | 0 | 0 | 2 |
| 17 | 32 | Kyrgyzstan | 8.761 | 0 | 0 | 0 | 1 |
| 18 | 35 | Yemen | 5.249 | 0 | 0 | 0 | 1 |
| 19 | 36 | (Sri Lanka) Sri Lanka | 4.071 | 0 | 0 | 0 | 0 |
| 20 | 37 | Bangladesh | 3.643 | 0 | 0 | 0 | 1 |
| 21 | 38 | Nepal | 3.268 | 0 | 0 | 0 | 0 ~~(1)~~ |
| 22 | 39 | Pakistan | 2.732 | 0 | 0 | 0 | 0 |
| 23 | 46 | Bhutan | 0.000 | 0 | 0 | 0 | 0 |
| Total | | | | 4 | 8 | 5 | 6 |
| Total | | | | 4 | 8 | 11 | |

East Zone
| Rank | | Member Association | Points | Slots | | |
| Rank | | Member Association | Points | ACL Play-off | Group stage | Play-off |
| Zone | All | Member Association | Points | ACL Play-off | Group stage | Play-off round |
|---|---|---|---|---|---|---|
| 7 | 18 | Indonesia | 25.004 | 1 | 1 | 0 |
| 8 | 20 | (Hong Kong) Hong Kong | 20.077 | 1 | 1 | 0 |
| 9 | 21 | Myanmar | 18.949 | 1 | 1 | 0 |
| 10 | 22 | Malaysia | 18.153 | 1 | 1 | 0 |
| 11 | 23 | India | 16.756 | 1 | 1 | 0 |
| 12 | 24 | Singapore | 16.097 | 1 | 1 | 0 |
| 13 | 26 | Maldives | 15.884 | 0 | 1 | 1 |
| 14 | 27 | Philippines | 12.268 | 0 | 1 | 1 |
| 15 | 31 | (North Korea) North Korea | 9.000 | 0 | 0 | 0 |
| 16 | 33 | Laos | 7.554 | 0 | 1 | 0 |
| 17 | 34 | Guam | 5.946 | 0 | 0 | 0 |
| 18 | 39 | (Timor-Leste) East Timor | 2.732 | 0 | 0 | 0 |
| 19 | 41 | Macau | 2.625 | 0 | 0 | 0 |
| 20 | 42 | Cambodia | 2.464 | 0 | 0 | 0 |
| 21 | 43 | (Chinese Taipei) Chinese Taipei | 2.089 | 0 | 0 | 0 |
| 22 | 44 | Mongolia | 1.554 | 0 | 0 | 0 |
| 23 | 45 | Brunei | 0.804 | 0 | 0 | 0 |
| Total | | | | 6 | 9 | 2 |

Notes

1. Iraq were given special entry to the 2015 AFC Cup, since they were not allowed to participate in the 2015 AFC Champions League as none of their teams passed the club licensing requirements for 2015.
2. Lebanon and Syria were not allowed to participate in the 2015 AFC Champions League as none of their teams passed the club licensing requirements for 2015, so their champions directly entered the AFC Cup group stage instead of playing in the AFC Champions League qualifying play-off.
3. Afghanistan were allocated one group stage slot and one play-off slot for the 2015 and 2016 AFC Cup, but did not submit an entry for the 2015 AFC Cup.
4. Turkmenistan were allocated one group stage slot and one play-off slot for the 2015 and 2016 AFC Cup, but both teams entered the qualifying play-off for the 2015 AFC Cup due to Iraq's participation.
5. Kyrgyzstan and Yemen were allocated one play-off slot for the 2015 AFC Cup due to participation in the 2014 AFC Cup.
6. Bangladesh and Nepal were allocated one play-off slot for the 2015 AFC Cup due to results in the 2014 AFC President's Cup.
7. Myanmar were allocated one group stage slot and one play-off slot for the 2015 and 2016 AFC Cup, but both teams entered the group stage for the 2015 AFC Cup due to North Korea's withdrawal.
8. Malaysia, India and Singapore were allocated one group stage slot and one play-off slot for the 2015 and 2016 AFC Cup, but both teams entered the group stage for the 2015 AFC Cup due to lack of play-off teams in the East Zone.
9. North Korea were allocated one group stage slot and one play-off slot for the 2015 and 2016 AFC Cup, but withdrew from the 2015 AFC Cup.
10. Laos were allocated one group stage slot and one play-off slot for the 2015 and 2016 AFC Cup, but only one team entered the 2015 AFC Cup.

== Teams ==
The following 41 teams from 23 associations entered the competition.

Teams in italics played in the 2015 AFC Champions League qualifying play-off, but failed to advance to the AFC Champions League group stage (had they advanced to the AFC Champions League group stage, they would have been replaced by another team from the same association).

West Zone
| Team | Qualifying method | App | Last App |
Group stage direct entrants (Groups A–D)
| (Iraq) Al-Shorta | 2013–14 Iraqi Premier League first place | 2nd | 2014 |
| (Iraq) Erbil | 2013–14 Iraqi Premier League second place | 6th | 2014 |
| (Kuwait) Al-Qadsia | 2013–14 Kuwaiti Premier League champions | 6th | 2014 |
| Al-Kuwait | 2013–14 Kuwait Emir Cup winners | 7th | 2014 |
| (Jordan) Al-Wehdat | 2013–14 Jordan League champions and 2013–14 Jordan FA Cup winners | 8th | 2012 |
| (Jordan) Al-Jazeera | 2013–14 Jordan League 3rd place | 1st | none |
| (Oman) Al-Nahda | 2013–14 Oman Professional League champions | 3rd | 2010 |
| (Bahrain) Riffa | 2013–14 Bahrain First Division League champions | 4th | 2014 |
| (Lebanon) Al-Nejmeh | 2013–14 Lebanese Premier League champions | 7th | 2014 |
| (Syria) Al-Wahda | 2013–14 Syrian Premier League champions | 4th | 2014 |
| (Palestine) Taraji Wadi Al-Nes | 2013–14 West Bank Premier League champions | 1st | none |
| (Tajikistan) Istiklol | 2014 Tajik League champions and 2014 Tajik Cup winners | 1st | none |
Qualifying play-off participants
Entering in play-off round
| (Oman) Fanja | 2013–14 Sultan Qaboos Cup winners | 3rd | 2014 |
| (Bahrain) Al-Hidd | 2013–14 Bahrain First Division League 3rd place | 2nd | 2014 |
| (Lebanon) Salam Zgharta | 2013–14 Lebanese FA Cup winners | 1st | none |
| (Syria) Al-Jaish | 2014 Syrian Cup winners | 5th | 2014 |
Entering in preliminary round
| (Palestine) Hilal Al-Quds | 2013–14 Palestine Cup winners | 1st | none |
| (Tajikistan) Khayr Vahdat | 2014 Tajik League runners-up | 1st | none |
| (Turkmenistan) Altyn Asyr | 2014 Ýokary Liga champions | 1st | none |
| (Turkmenistan) Ahal | 2014 Turkmenistan Cup winners | 1st | none |
| (Kyrgyzstan) Dordoi | 2014 Kyrgyzstan League champions | 1st | none |
| (Yemen) Al-Saqr | 2013–14 Yemeni League champions | 3rd | 2011 |
| (Bangladesh) Sheikh Russel | 2014 AFC President's Cup group stage winners | 1st | none |
| (Nepal) Manang Marshyangdi Club | 2014 AFC President's Cup group stage winners | 1st | none |

East Zone
| Team | Qualifying method | App | Last App |
Group stage direct entrants (Groups E–H)
| (Indonesia) Persib Bandung | 2014 Indonesia Super League champions | 1st | none |
| (Indonesia) Persipura Jayapura | 2014 Indonesia Super League runners-up | 3rd | 2014 |
| (Hong Kong) Kitchee | 2013–14 Hong Kong First Division League champions | 5th | 2014 |
| (Hong Kong) South China | 2013–14 Hong Kong season play-off winners | 6th | 2014 |
| (Myanmar) Yadanarbon | 2014 Myanmar National League champions | 1st | none |
| (Myanmar) Ayeyawady United | 2014 MFF Cup winners | 3rd | 2013 |
| (Malaysia) Johor Darul Ta'zim | 2014 Malaysia Super League champions | 2nd | 2009 |
| (Malaysia) Pahang | 2014 Malaysia FA Cup winners | 3rd | 2007 |
| (India) Bengaluru | 2013–14 I-League champions | 1st | none |
| (India) East Bengal | 2013–14 I-League runners-up | 8th | 2013 |
| (Singapore) Warriors | 2014 S.League champions | 4th | 2013 |
| (Singapore) Balestier Khalsa | 2014 Singapore Cup winners | 1st | none |
| (Maldives) New Radiant | 2014 Dhivehi League champions | 7th | 2014 |
| (Philippines) Global | 2014 UFL Division 1 champions | 1st | none |
| (Laos) Lao Toyota | 2014 Lao League runners-up | 1st | none |
Qualifying play-off participants
Entering in play-off round
| (Maldives) Maziya | 2014 Maldives FA Cup winners | 3rd | 2014 |
| (Philippines) Ceres | 2014 UFL FA League Cup winners | 1st | none |

Notes

1. Bahrain (BHR): Al-Hidd entered the AFC Cup instead of East Riffa, the 2014 Bahraini King's Cup winners.
2. India (IND): East Bengal entered the AFC Cup instead of Churchill Brothers, the 2013–14 Indian Federation Cup winners.
3. Indonesia (IDN): Since the Piala Indonesia had to be cancelled due to tightness of schedule caused by the parliamentary and presidential elections, the Indonesia Super League runners-up were chosen to represent Indonesia in the AFC Cup.
4. Iraq (IRQ): Due to the worsening war situation and increased unrest in the country, the Iraq Football Association (IFA) ended the 2013–14 Iraqi Premier League on 18 June 2014 and declared the standings on that date as final. The IFA did not crown a champion or runner-up of the league, but first-placed Al-Shorta and second-placed Erbil were considered to be the champions and runners-up only for the purpose of enabling admission into the AFC Cup.
5. Jordan (JOR): Al-Jazeera entered the AFC Cup instead of Al-Faisaly, the 2013–14 Jordan League runners-up.
6. Philippines (PHI): The Philippine Football Federation confirmed that the UFL Division 1 champions (entering group stage) and the UFL FA League Cup winners (entering play-off) were chosen to represent the Philippines in the AFC Cup.
Location of teams of the 2015 AFC Cup.
West Zone
East Zone
(p) Qualifying play-off participants

== Schedule ==
The schedule of the competition was as follows (all draws were held in Kuala Lumpur, Malaysia).

| Stage | Round | Draw date | First leg | Second leg |
|---|---|---|---|---|
| Preliminary stage | Preliminary round | No draw | 9–10 February 2015 | |
| Play-off stage | Play-off round | No draw | 17 February 2015 | |
| Group stage | Matchday 1 | 11 December 2014 | 24–25 February 2015 | |
| Group stage | Matchday 2 | 11 December 2014 | 10–11 March 2015 | |
| Group stage | Matchday 3 | 11 December 2014 | 17–18 March 2015 | |
| Group stage | Matchday 4 | 11 December 2014 | 14–15 April 2015 | |
| Group stage | Matchday 5 | 11 December 2014 | 28–29 April 2015 | |
| Group stage | Matchday 6 | 11 December 2014 | 12–13 May 2015 | |
| Knockout stage | Round of 16 | 11 December 2014 | 26–27 May 2015 | |
| Knockout stage | Quarter-finals | 18 June 2015 | 25–26 August 2015 | 15–16 September 2015 |
| Knockout stage | Semi-finals | 18 June 2015 | 29–30 September 2015 | 20–21 October 2015 |
| Knockout stage | Final | 18 June 2015 | 31 October 2015 at Pamir Stadium, Dushanbe | |

== Qualifying play-off ==
The bracket for the qualifying play-off, which consisted of two rounds (preliminary round and play-off round), was determined by the AFC based on the association ranking of each team. Each tie was played as a single match, with the team from the higher-ranked association hosting the match. Extra time and penalty shoot-out were used to decide the winner if necessary. The winners of each tie in the play-off round advanced to the group stage to join the 27 automatic qualifiers.

=== Preliminary round ===
| Team 1 | Score | Team 2 |
West Zone
| Ahal (Turkmenistan) | 1–0 | (Kyrgyzstan) Dordoi |
| Altyn Asyr (Turkmenistan) | 0–1 | (Yemen) Al-Saqr |
| Khayr Vahdat (Tajikistan) | 1–0 | (Bangladesh) Sheikh Russel |
| Hilal Al-Quds (Palestine) | w/o | (Nepal) Manang Marshyangdi Club |

Notes

11. Manang Marshyangdi Club withdrew.

=== Play-off round ===
| Team 1 | Score | Team 2 |
West Zone
| Fanja (Oman) | 2–3 | (Turkmenistan) Ahal |
| Al-Hidd (Bahrain) | 2–1 | (Yemen) Al-Saqr |
| Salam Zgharta (Lebanon) | 3–0 | (Tajikistan) Khayr Vahdat |
| Al-Jaish (Syria) | 0–0 (a.e.t.) (5–4 p) | (Palestine) Hilal Al-Quds |
East Zone
| Maziya (Maldives) | 1–0 | (Philippines) Ceres |

== Group stage ==
The draw for the group stage was held on 11 December 2014. The 32 teams were drawn into eight groups of four. Teams from the same association could not be drawn into the same group. Each group was played on a home-and-away round-robin basis. The winners and runners-up of each group advanced to the round of 16.

Tiebreakers

The teams were ranked according to points (3 points for a win, 1 point for a draw, 0 points for a loss). If tied on points, tiebreakers would be applied in the following order:

1. Greater number of points obtained in the group matches between the teams concerned;
2. Goal difference resulting from the group matches between the teams concerned;
3. Greater number of goals scored in the group matches between the teams concerned;
4. Greater number of away goals scored in the group matches between the teams concerned;
5. If, after applying criteria 1 to 4, teams still have an equal ranking, criteria 1 to 4 are reapplied exclusively to the matches between the teams in question to determine their final rankings. If this procedure does not lead to a decision, criteria 6 to 10 apply;
6. Goal difference in all the group matches;
7. Greater number of goals scored in all the group matches;
8. Penalty shoot-out if only two teams are involved and they are both on the field of play;
9. Fewer score calculated according to the number of yellow and red cards received in the group matches (1 point for a single yellow card, 3 points for a red card as a consequence of two yellow cards, 3 points for a direct red card, 4 points for a yellow card followed by a direct red card);
10. Team who belongs to the member association with the higher AFC ranking.

=== Group A ===
| Pos | Team | Pld | W | D | L | GF | GA | GD | Pts | Qualification | WEH | WAH | NAH | SZG |
|---|---|---|---|---|---|---|---|---|---|---|---|---|---|---|
| 1 | (Jordan) Al-Wehdat | 6 | 4 | 1 | 1 | 16 | 3 | +13 | 13 | Advance to knockout stage | — | 0–1 | 4–0 | 5–1 |
| 2 | (Syria) Al-Wahda | 6 | 3 | 2 | 1 | 8 | 4 | +4 | 11 | Advance to knockout stage | 1–1 | — | 1–2 | 3–1 |
| 3 | (Oman) Al-Nahda | 6 | 2 | 1 | 3 | 7 | 11 | −4 | 7 | | 0–3 | 0–0 | — | 4–1 |
| 4 | (Lebanon) Salam Zgharta | 6 | 1 | 0 | 5 | 5 | 18 | −13 | 3 | | 0–3 | 0–2 | 2–1 | — |

Source: AFC

=== Group B ===
| Pos | Team | Pld | W | D | L | GF | GA | GD | Pts | Qualification | SHO | JAZ | TWN | HID |
|---|---|---|---|---|---|---|---|---|---|---|---|---|---|---|
| 1 | (Iraq) Al-Shorta | 6 | 2 | 3 | 1 | 14 | 7 | +7 | 9 | Advance to knockout stage | — | 4–0 | 6–2 | 2–2 |
| 2 | (Jordan) Al-Jazeera | 6 | 2 | 3 | 1 | 6 | 7 | −1 | 9 | Advance to knockout stage | 1–1 | — | 2–0 | 1–0 |
| 3 | (Palestine) Taraji Wadi Al-Nes | 6 | 1 | 3 | 2 | 6 | 11 | −5 | 6 | | 1–0 | 1–1 | — | 1–1 |
| 4 | (Bahrain) Al-Hidd | 6 | 0 | 5 | 1 | 6 | 7 | −1 | 5 | | 1–1 | 1–1 | 1–1 | — |

Source: AFC

=== Group C ===
| Pos | Team | Pld | W | D | L | GF | GA | GD | Pts | Qualification | IST | QAD | ERB | AHA |
|---|---|---|---|---|---|---|---|---|---|---|---|---|---|---|
| 1 | (Tajikistan) Istiklol | 6 | 3 | 2 | 1 | 12 | 8 | +4 | 11 | Advance to knockout stage | — | 2–0 | 1–3 | 5–2 |
| 2 | (Kuwait) Al-Qadsia | 6 | 3 | 1 | 2 | 7 | 6 | +1 | 10 | Advance to knockout stage | 2–2 | — | 1–2 | 2–0 |
| 3 | (Iraq) Erbil | 6 | 2 | 1 | 3 | 8 | 8 | 0 | 7 | | 0–0 | 0–1 | — | 2–3 |
| 4 | (Turkmenistan) Ahal | 6 | 2 | 0 | 4 | 8 | 13 | −5 | 6 | | 1–2 | 0–1 | 2–1 | — |

Source: AFC

=== Group D ===
| Pos | Team | Pld | W | D | L | GF | GA | GD | Pts | Qualification | JAI | KUW | RIF | NEJ |
|---|---|---|---|---|---|---|---|---|---|---|---|---|---|---|
| 1 | (Syria) Al-Jaish | 6 | 4 | 2 | 0 | 6 | 1 | +5 | 14 | Advance to knockout stage | — | 0–0 | 1–1 | 1–0 |
| 2 | Al-Kuwait | 6 | 3 | 1 | 2 | 9 | 6 | +3 | 10 | Advance to knockout stage | 0–1 | — | 2–1 | 4–1 |
| 3 | (Bahrain) Riffa | 6 | 2 | 2 | 2 | 7 | 7 | 0 | 8 | | 0–1 | 2–1 | — | 2–1 |
| 4 | (Lebanon) Al-Nejmeh | 6 | 0 | 1 | 5 | 4 | 12 | −8 | 1 | | 0–2 | 1–2 | 1–1 | — |

Source: AFC

=== Group E ===
| Pos | Team | Pld | W | D | L | GF | GA | GD | Pts | Qualification | PSJ | BGL | MAZ | WAR |
|---|---|---|---|---|---|---|---|---|---|---|---|---|---|---|
| 1 | (Indonesia) Persipura Jayapura | 6 | 5 | 1 | 0 | 17 | 4 | +13 | 16 | Advance to knockout stage | — | 3–1 | 0–0 | 6–0 |
| 2 | (India) Bengaluru | 6 | 4 | 0 | 2 | 8 | 8 | 0 | 12 | Advance to knockout stage | 1–3 | — | 2–1 | 1–0 |
| 3 | (Maldives) Maziya | 6 | 2 | 1 | 3 | 7 | 6 | +1 | 7 | | 1–2 | 1–2 | — | 2–0 |
| 4 | (Singapore) Warriors | 6 | 0 | 0 | 6 | 1 | 15 | −14 | 0 | | 1–3 | 0–1 | 0–2 | — |

Source: AFC

=== Group F ===
| Pos | Team | Pld | W | D | L | GF | GA | GD | Pts | Qualification | JDT | KIT | EBG | BAL |
|---|---|---|---|---|---|---|---|---|---|---|---|---|---|---|
| 1 | (Malaysia) Johor Darul Ta'zim | 6 | 5 | 0 | 1 | 11 | 3 | +8 | 15 | Advance to knockout stage | — | 2–0 | 4–1 | 3–0 |
| 2 | (Hong Kong) Kitchee | 6 | 3 | 2 | 1 | 10 | 6 | +4 | 11 | Advance to knockout stage | 2–0 | — | 2–2 | 3–0 |
| 3 | (India) East Bengal | 6 | 1 | 2 | 3 | 8 | 10 | −2 | 5 | | 0–1 | 1–1 | — | 3–0 |
| 4 | (Singapore) Balestier Khalsa | 6 | 1 | 0 | 5 | 3 | 13 | −10 | 3 | | 0–1 | 1–2 | 2–1 | — |

Source: AFC

=== Group G ===
| Pos | Team | Pld | W | D | L | GF | GA | GD | Pts | Qualification | SCA | PAH | GLO | YAD |
|---|---|---|---|---|---|---|---|---|---|---|---|---|---|---|
| 1 | (Hong Kong) South China | 6 | 6 | 0 | 0 | 19 | 3 | +16 | 18 | Advance to knockout stage | — | 3–1 | 3–0 | 3–1 |
| 2 | (Malaysia) Pahang | 6 | 2 | 2 | 2 | 11 | 10 | +1 | 8 | Advance to knockout stage | 0–1 | — | 0–0 | 7–4 |
| 3 | (Philippines) Global | 6 | 1 | 2 | 3 | 5 | 12 | −7 | 5 | | 1–6 | 0–0 | — | 4–1 |
| 4 | (Myanmar) Yadanarbon | 6 | 1 | 0 | 5 | 10 | 20 | −10 | 3 | | 0–3 | 2–3 | 2–0 | — |

Source: AFC

=== Group H ===
| Pos | Team | Pld | W | D | L | GF | GA | GD | Pts | Qualification | PSB | AYE | NRA | LAO |
|---|---|---|---|---|---|---|---|---|---|---|---|---|---|---|
| 1 | (Indonesia) Persib Bandung | 6 | 3 | 3 | 0 | 10 | 5 | +5 | 12 | Advance to knockout stage | — | 3–3 | 4–1 | 1–0 |
| 2 | (Myanmar) Ayeyawady United | 6 | 2 | 4 | 0 | 13 | 9 | +4 | 10 | Advance to knockout stage | 1–1 | — | 0–0 | 4–3 |
| 3 | (Maldives) New Radiant | 6 | 1 | 2 | 3 | 4 | 10 | −6 | 5 | | 0–1 | 0–3 | — | 2–1 |
| 4 | (Laos) Lao Toyota | 6 | 0 | 3 | 3 | 7 | 10 | −3 | 3 | | 0–0 | 2–2 | 1–1 | — |

Source: AFC

== Knockout stage ==
In the knockout stage, the 16 teams played a single-elimination tournament. In the quarter-finals and semi-finals, each tie was played on a home-and-away two-legged basis, while in the round of 16 and final, each tie was played as a single match. The away goals rule (for two-legged ties), extra time (away goals would not apply in extra time) and penalty shoot-out were used to decide the winner if necessary.

=== Bracket ===
Round of 16
(Iraq) Al-Shorta | 0
Al-Kuwait | 2
(Indonesia) Persib Bandung | 0
(Hong Kong) Kitchee | 2
(Tajikistan) Istiklol (pen.) | 1(4)
(Syria) Al-Wahda | 1(2)
(Indonesia) Persipura Jayapura | 0
(Malaysia) Pahang (awd.) | 3
(Jordan) Al-Wehdat | 0
(Kuwait) Al-Qadsia | 1
(Syria) Al-Jaish | 1
(Jordan) Al-Jazeera | 0
(Malaysia) Johor Darul Ta'zim | 5
(Myanmar) Ayeyawady United | 0
(Hong Kong) South China | 2
(India) Bengaluru | 0

Quarter-finals
Al-Kuwait | 6 | 1 | 7
(Hong Kong) Kitchee | 0 | 1 | 1
(Tajikistan) Istiklol | 4 | 1 | 5
(Malaysia) Pahang | 0 | 3 | 3
(Kuwait) Al-Qadsia | 3 | 0 | 3
(Syria) Al-Jaish | 0 | 2 | 2
(Malaysia) Johor Darul Ta'zim | 1 | 3 | 4
(Hong Kong) South China | 1 | 1 | 2

Semi-finals
Al-Kuwait | 4 | — | —
(Tajikistan) Istiklol (w/o) | 0 | — | —
(Kuwait) Al-Qadsia | 3 | — | —
(Malaysia) Johor Darul Ta'zim (w/o) | 1 | — | —

Final
(Tajikistan) Istiklol | 0
(Malaysia) Johor Darul Ta'zim | 1

=== Round of 16 ===
In the round of 16, the winners of one group played the runners-up of another group in the same zone, with the group winners hosting the match.

| Team 1 | Score | Team 2 |
West Zone
| Al-Wehdat (Jordan) | 0–1 | (Kuwait) Al-Qadsia |
| Istiklol (Tajikistan) | 1–1 (a.e.t.) (4–2 p) | (Syria) Al-Wahda |
| Al-Shorta (Iraq) | 0–2 | Al-Kuwait |
| Al-Jaish (Syria) | 1–0 | (Jordan) Al-Jazeera |
East Zone
| Persipura Jayapura (Indonesia) | 0–3 (awd.) | (Malaysia) Pahang |
| South China (Hong Kong) | 2–0 | (India) Bengaluru |
| Johor Darul Ta'zim (Malaysia) | 5–0 | (Myanmar) Ayeyawady United |
| Persib Bandung (Indonesia) | 0–2 | (Hong Kong) Kitchee |

Notes

12. The Persipura Jayapura v Pahang match was not played as scheduled as Pahang players were denied entry into Indonesia due to visa issues. The AFC announced on 10 June 2015 that as a result of this and the suspension of Indonesia by FIFA, Persipura Jayapura forfeited the match and was considered to have lost the match by 3–0, based on the AFC Cup 2015 Competition Regulations and the AFC Disciplinary Code.

=== Quarter-finals ===
The draw for the quarter-finals was held on 18 June 2015. Teams from different zones could be drawn into the same tie, and there was no seeding or country protection, so teams from the same association could be drawn into the same tie.

| Team 1 | Agg. | Team 2 | 1st leg | 2nd leg |
|---|---|---|---|---|
| Al-Qadsia (Kuwait) | 3–2 | (Syria) Al-Jaish | 3–0 | 0–2 |
| Johor Darul Ta'zim (Malaysia) | 4–2 | (Hong Kong) South China | 1–1 | 3–1 |
| Al-Kuwait | 7–1 | (Hong Kong) Kitchee | 6–0 | 1–1 |
| Istiklol (Tajikistan) | 5–3 | (Malaysia) Pahang | 4–0 | 1–3 |

=== Semi-finals ===
In the semi-finals, the matchups were determined by the quarter-final draw.

| Team 1 | Agg. | Team 2 | 1st leg | 2nd leg |
|---|---|---|---|---|
| Al-Qadsia (Kuwait) | w/o | (Malaysia) Johor Darul Ta'zim | 3–1 | Cancelled |
| Al-Kuwait | w/o | (Tajikistan) Istiklol | 4–0 | Cancelled |

Notes

13. On 16 October 2015, the Kuwait Football Association was suspended by FIFA: as a result, Al-Qadsia and Al-Kuwait were both disqualified from the AFC Cup. Therefore, the second legs of both semi-finals were scratched, and Johor Darul Ta'zim and Istiklol advanced to the final.

=== Final ===
In the final, the host team was determined by a draw, held after the quarter-final draw.

31 October 2015
17:00 UTC+5

| Istiklol (Tajikistan) | 0–1 | (Malaysia) Johor Darul Ta'zim |
|---|---|---|
| | Report | Velázquez 23' |

Pamir Stadium, Dushanbe
Attendance: 18,000
Referee: Minoru Tōjō (Japan)

== Awards ==
| Award | Player | Team |
|---|---|---|
| Most Valuable Player | (Malaysia) Mohd Safiq Rahim | (Malaysia) Johor Darul Ta'zim |
| Top Goalscorer | (Australia) Daniel McBreen | (Hong Kong) South China |
| Top Goalscorer | (North Macedonia) Riste Naumov | (Myanmar) Ayeyawady United |

== Top scorers ==
| Rank | Player | Team | MD1 | MD2 | MD3 | MD4 | MD5 | MD6 | 2R | QF1 | QF2 | SF1 | SF2 | F | Total |
|---|---|---|---|---|---|---|---|---|---|---|---|---|---|---|---|
| 1 | (Australia) Daniel McBreen | (Hong Kong) South China | 2 | 1 | | | 1 | 2 | 2 | | | | | | 8 |
| 1 | (North Macedonia) Riste Naumov | (Myanmar) Ayeyawady United | 2 | | 2 | | 2 | 2 | | | | | | | 8 |
| 3 | (Nigeria) Dickson Nwakaeme | (Malaysia) Pahang | 1 | | | 2 | 3 | | | | | | | | 6 |
| 4 | (Spain) Juan Belencoso | (Hong Kong) Kitchee | | 1 | 1 | | 2 | | 1 | | | | | | 5 |
| 4 | (Cameroon) Mahama Awal | (Hong Kong) South China | 2 | 1 | | | | | | 1 | 1 | | | | 5 |
| 4 | (Indonesia) Boaz Solossa | (Indonesia) Persipura Jayapura | 1 | | 1 | | 2 | 1 | | | | | | | 5 |
| 4 | (Brazil) Rogerinho | Al-Kuwait | | | | | 2 | | 1 | 2 | | | | | 5 |
| 4 | (Kuwait) Bader Al-Mutawa | (Kuwait) Al-Qadsia | | | 2 | | 1 | | | 1 | | 1 | | | 5 |
| 4 | (Argentina) Luciano Figueroa | (Malaysia) Johor Darul Ta'zim | | | | 1 | | 1 | 2 | 1 | | | | | 5 |
| 10 | (Nigeria) Ranti Martins | (India) East Bengal | 1 | 1 | | 1 | | 1 | | | | | | | 4 |
| 10 | (Iraq) Marwan Hussein | (Iraq) Al-Shorta | | | 2 | | | 2 | | | | | | | 4 |
| 10 | (Jordan) Mahmoud Za'tara | (Jordan) Al-Wehdat | 2 | 1 | | | | 1 | | | | | | | 4 |
| 10 | (Brazil) Vinícius | Al-Kuwait | | | | | | | | 1 | | 3 | | | 4 |
| 10 | (Malaysia) Safee Sali | (Malaysia) Johor Darul Ta'zim | 1 | | | | | 1 | | | 2 | | | | 4 |
| 10 | (Malaysia) Mohd Safiq Rahim | (Malaysia) Johor Darul Ta'zim | 1 | | | 1 | | 1 | 1 | | | | | | 4 |
| 10 | (Colombia) Edison Fonseca | (Myanmar) Ayeyawady United | | 1 | 1 | | 2 | | | | | | | | 4 |
| 10 | (Tajikistan) Manuchekhr Dzhalilov | (Tajikistan) Istiklol | | | 1 | 1 | | 2 | | | | | | | 4 |
| 10 | (Tajikistan) Khurshed Makhmudov | (Tajikistan) Istiklol | | 1 | | | | 1 | | 1 | 1 | | | | 4 |

Note: Goals scored in qualifying play-off not counted when determining top scorer (see regulations, Article 77.4).

Source: the-AFC.com

== See also ==
- 2015 AFC Champions League
