= 2015 Turkmenistan Cup =

Tournament details
- Country: Turkmenistan
- Teams: 11

Final positions
- Champions: Altyn Asyr FK
- Runners-up: Şagadam FK

The 2015 Turkmenistan Cup (Turkmen: Türkmenistanyň Kubogy 2015) was the 22nd season of the Turkmenistan Cup knockout tournament. Performed by the system of leaving since the quarterfinals, except commands FC Merw, FC Köpetdag, FC Daşoguz and FC Energetik Türkmenbaşy, they began the tournament with a preliminary stage. The preliminary stage of the tournament was launched August 1, 2015. The final match will held 15 December 2015. The cup champion wins a spot in the 2016 Turkmenistan Supercup final. The cup winner qualified for the 2016 AFC Cup.

== Round 1 ==
The Round 1 involves 4 teams. Games played on 1 and 4 August 2015.

Team 1	Agg.	Team 2	1st leg	2nd leg
FC Energetik Türkmenbaşy	3 – 0	FC Daşoguz	2 – 0	1 – 0
FC Merw	0 – 3	FC Köpetdag	0 – 1	0 – 2

== Round 2 ==
The Round 2 involves 2 teams. Games played on 12 and 19 August 2015.

Team 1	Agg.	Team 2	1st leg	2nd leg
FC Köpetdag	2 – 3	Energetik	2 –1	0 – 2

== Quarterfinals ==
The quarterfinals involve 8 teams. Games played on 12 and 19 September 2015.

Team 1	Agg.	Team 2	1st leg	2nd leg
FC Ahal	3–5	FC Balkan	3 – 1	0–4
FC HTTU	1–4	FC Altyn Asyr	1 – 3	0–1
Hazyna SC	4–2	FC Aşgabat	3 – 2	1–0
FC Şagadam	3–2	FC Energetik	1 – 0	2–2

== Semifinals ==
The semifinals involve 4 teams. Games will be played on 24 and 31 October 2015.

Team 1	Agg.	Team 2	1st leg	2nd leg
FC Balkan	1–8	FC Altyn Asyr	1–8	-–+
Hazyna SC	1–3	FC Şagadam	1–0	0–3

== Final ==
Game will be played on 14 December 2015.

14 December 2015

Altyn Asyr FK	0 (7) – 0 (6)	Şagadam FK

Balkanabat Stadium

== See also ==
2015 Turkmenistan First League
2015 Ýokary Liga
