= 2013–14 West Bank Premier League =

West Bank Premier League
- Season: 2013–14
- Champions: Taraji Wadi Al-Nes
- Relegated: Islami Qalqilya; Shabab Al-Bireh
- 2015 AFC Cup: Taraji Wadi Al-Nes; Shabab Al-Dhahiriya
- Top goalscorer: Mohammad Nadeem (13 goals)
- Biggest home win: Taraji Wadi Al-Nes 6–1 Markaz Shabab Al-Am'ari Taraji Wadi Al-Nes 5–0 Islami Qalqilya Shabab Al-Khader 5–0 Islami Qalqilya
- Biggest away win: Shabab Al-Bireh 1–6 Markaz Balata
- Highest scoring: Shabab Al-Khalil 5–3 Islamy Qalqilya

The 2013–14 West Bank Premier League was the 11th season of the top-level football league in the West Bank, Palestine. It began on 10 September 2013 and ended on 29 March 2014. Shabab Al-Dhahiriya were the defending champions.

== League table ==
Pos	Team	Pld	W	D	L	GF	GA	GD	Pts	Qualification or relegation
1	Taraji Wadi Al-Nes (C)	22	14	4	4	39	13	+26	46	2015 AFC Cup group stage
2	Shabab Al-Dhahiriya	22	12	7	3	36	21	+15	43	2015 AFC Cup Qualifying play-off
3	Shabab Al-Khalil	22	11	7	4	36	23	+13	40	
4	Shabab Al-Khadr	22	11	5	6	37	23	+14	38	
5	Markaz Balata	22	9	6	7	34	33	+1	33	
6	Jabal Al-Mukaber	22	8	7	7	27	27	0	31	
7	Markaz Shabab Al-Am'ari	22	9	3	10	24	29	−5	30	
8	Hilal Al-Quds	22	5	10	7	25	22	+3	25	
9	Ahli Al-Khalil	22	6	7	9	28	34	−6	25	
10	Thaqafi Tulkarm	22	5	9	8	26	30	−4	24	
11	Shabab Al-Bireh (R)	22	3	5	14	16	39	−23	14	Relegation to 2014–15 West Bank First League
12	Islami Qalqilya (R)	22	2	4	16	17	51	−34	10	Relegation to 2014–15 West Bank First League

Updated to match(es) played on 29 March 2014. Source: Jawal Professional League 2013–2014
Rules for classification: 1) points; 2) head-to-head points; 3) head-to-head goal difference; 4) head-to-head goals scored; 5) goal difference; 6) number of goals scored.
(C) Champions; (R) Relegated
