= 2015 Turkmenistan First League =

Turkmenistan First League
- Season: 2015
- Champions: Köpetdag Aşgabat

Top team from each zone will qualify to final round in which promoted team to 2016 Ýokary Liga will be decided.

== Balkan Zone ==
- Balkan-2
- Awaza
- Galkynyş Türkmenbaşy
- Gumdag
- Hazar Tolkuny
- Nebitgurluşyk
- Sary-Daş - 1 place
- Şagadam-2
- Ýaşlyk

== Central Zone ==
- Altyn-Taç
- Kerwen
- Diýar
- Hasyl
- Köpetdag Aşgabat - 1 place
- Kopetdag-2
- MGSK

== Daşoguz Zone ==
- Almaz
- Aral
- Arzuw
- Dostluk
- Eshret (Akdepe)
- Görogly
- Obahyzmat
- Standard - 1 place

== Mary Zone ==
- Agzybirlik
- Energetik-2
- Futbol Mekdep-1
- Futbol Mekdep-2
- Jemagat
- Kuwwat
- Merw-2
- MTS
- Nesip
- Ýolöten

== Promotion tournament ==
From 23 to 28 November in Dashoguz was held tournament for the right to play in the Ýokary Liga 2016. Tournament is played on round-robin basis.

- FC Bagtyyarlyk-Lebap (Türkmenabat)
- Kopetdag (Ashgabat)
- Marguş (Mary District)
- Standart (Daşoguz)
- Sary-daş (Serdar)

Team	Pld	W	D	L	GF	GA	GD	Pts	KÖP	BAG	SRD	STN	MRG
(Turkmenistan) Köpetdag	2	2	0	0	6	1	+5	6					
(Turkmenistan) Bagtyyarlyk-Lebap	3	2	0	1	6	4	+2	6	2–1				
(Turkmenistan) Sary-daş	2	1	0	1	5	4	+1	3					
(Turkmenistan) Standart	2	1	0	1	5	5	0	3		1–2	4–3		
(Turkmenistan) Marguş	3	0	0	3	1	9	−8	0	0–4	1–3	2–0		

23 November 2015

Köpetdag (Turkmenistan)	4-0	(Turkmenistan) Marguş
Annagulyyev 10' (pen.); Ovezgeldiyev 56'; Gurbanov 64'; Muhammetmyradov 90+'

Sport Toplumy, Daşoguz
23 November 2015

Standart (Turkmenistan)	1-2	(Turkmenistan) Bagtyyarlyk-Lebap

Sport Toplumy, Daşoguz

24 November 2015

Sary-daş (Turkmenistan)	2-0	(Turkmenistan) Marguş

Sport Toplumy, Daşoguz
24 November 2015

Bagtyyarlyk-Lebap (Turkmenistan)	1-2	(Turkmenistan) Köpetdag

Sport Toplumy, Daşoguz

25 November 2015

Marguş (Turkmenistan)	1-3	(Turkmenistan) Bagtyyarlyk-Lebap

Sport Toplumy, Daşoguz
25 November 2015

Standart (Turkmenistan)	4-3	(Turkmenistan) Sary-daş

Sport Toplumy, Daşoguz

27 November 2015

Köpetdag (Turkmenistan)	v	(Turkmenistan) Sary-daş

Sport Toplumy, Daşoguz
27 November 2015

Marguş (Turkmenistan)	v	(Turkmenistan) Standart

Sport Toplumy, Daşoguz

28 November 2015

Sary-daş (Turkmenistan)	v	(Turkmenistan) Bagtyyarlyk-Lebap

Sport Toplumy, Daşoguz
28 November 2015

Standart (Turkmenistan)	v	(Turkmenistan) Köpetdag

Sport Toplumy, Daşoguz

== See also ==
- 2015 Turkmenistan Cup
- 2015 Ýokary Liga
