= Maksatmyrat Şamyradow =

Turkmen footballer and coach

Personal information
- Full name: Maksatmyrat Şamyradow
- Date of birth: 6 May 1984 (age 42)
- Place of birth: Soviet Union
- Position: Goalkeeper

Team information
- Current team: Altyn Asyr

Senior career*
Years	Team	Apps	(Gls)
2007–2009	FC Aşgabat		
2009–2010	Naft Tehran F.C.		
2010–2012	Gol Gohar		
2013–2014	Olmaliq FK	27	

International career^{‡}
2009–2014	Turkmenistan	3	(0)
- * Club domestic league appearances and goals as of June 07, 2014 ‡ National team caps and goals as of June 07, 2014

Maksatmyrat Şamyradow (born 6 May 1984) is a former Turkmen footballer. Currently goalkeeper coach with Altyn Asyr.

== Career ==
Şamyradow featured for FC Aşgabat in the 2008, and 2009 editions of the CIS cup

In 2010–2012, played for the Iranian Gol Gohar.

Since 2013, the player of Uzbek Olmaliq FK.
