= Makhammetgeldi Annaamanov =

Turkmen politician (born 1959)

Makhammetgeldi Annaamanov (born 1959) is a Turkmen politician. He is the current Minister of Education of Turkmenistan.

Born in Ashgabat, he graduated from the Turkmen Institute of National Economy and gained a master's degree in economic sciences. Since 2004 he has been rector of the Turkmen Institute of National Economy and Minister of Education since 2006.
