= Serdaraly Ataýew =

Turkmen footballer

Personal information
- Full name: Serdaraly Myratalyýeiwç Ataýew
- Date of birth: December 14, 1984 (age 41)
- Place of birth: Turkmen SSR, USSR
- Position: Striker

Team information
- Current team: Nebitçi
- Number: 10

Senior career*
Years	Team	Apps	(Gls)
2010	FC Ahal		
2011	FC Altyn Asyr		
2013	FK Dinamo Samarqand		
2013	FC Ahal		
2014–2015	FC Balkan		
2016	FC Energetik Mary		
2017	Şagadam FK		
2018	FC Alga Bishkek	?	(12)
2019	Şagadam FK		
2020	FC Energetik Mary	3	(0)
2020-	Nebitçi	0	(0)

International career^{‡}
2015–2016	Turkmenistan	8	(1)
- * Club domestic league appearances and goals as of 29.08.2020 ‡ National team caps and goals as of 28 January 2013

Serdaraly Ataýew (also spelled Serdarali Atayev, born December 14, 1984) is a professional Turkmen football player who played in Nebitçi FT. He is former member of Turkmenistan national football team.

== Club career ==
Started his career in futsal. Best futsal player of Turkmenistan 2010 with Hereket.

Played in the Championship of Uzbekistan for FK Dinamo Samarqand.

He won the 2013 Turkmenistan Cup with FC Ahal, scoring the winning goal at the final. In 2014, he won the Turkmenistan Super Cup.

He spent the season of 2018 for the FC Alga Bishkek in the championship of Kyrgyzstan. Scored 12 goals.

In 2019, he returned to Turkmenistan, again becoming a Şagadam FK player.

Serdaraly Ataýew joined Energetik FK in January 2020. After unsuccessful trials at Energetik FK Serdaraly Ataýew signed contract with Nebitçi FT in August 2020.

== International career ==
He played for Turkmenistan national futsal team at 2010 AFC Futsal Championship.

Ataýew made his debut for Turkmenistan national football team on 11 June 2015 against Guam.

=== International goals ===
Scores and results list Turkmenistan's goal tally first.

Goal	Date	Venue	Opponent	Score	Result	Competition
1.	29 March 2016	Jawaharlal Nehru Stadium, Kochi, India	India	2–1	2–1	2018 FIFA World Cup qualification

== Honours ==
- Turkmenistan Cup:

Winner: 2013

- Turkmenistan Super Cup:

Winner: 2014
