= Hazyna SK =

Defunct Turkmen football club

Hazyna
- Full name: Hazyna sport kluby
- Nickname(s): Students
- Founded: 2015
- Dissolved: 2016
- Stadium: Stadium of TSIEM
- League: Ýokary Liga
- 2015: 7

Hazyna Sport Club (Turkmen: Hazyna sport kluby) was a Turkmenistan professional football club based in Ashgabat, formerly of the Ýokary Liga. It is the football team of the Turkmen State Institute of Economics and Management.

== History ==
The team was established in February 2015. Taking into account the growing popularity of football among students Football Federation of Turkmenistan made an exception by allowing the team to participate in the Ýokary Liga without a selection in the Turkmenistan First League. The new club was headed by Ahmet Agamyradow. At 2016 Hazyna SK folded, ceasing to exist as a professional football club.
