= Süleýman Orazow =

Turkmen footballer

Personal information
- Date of birth: 2 January 1989 (age 37)
- Place of birth: Ashkhabad, Turkmen SSR, USSR
- Height: 1.87 m (6 ft 2 in)
- Position: Midfielder

Team information
- Current team: Ashgabat
- Number: 20

Senior career*
Years	Team	Apps	(Gls)
2010	Ashgabat		
–2019	Ahal		
2020-	Ashgabat		

International career^{‡}
2015–	Turkmenistan	2	(0)
- * Club domestic league appearances and goals as of June 17, 2015 ‡ National team caps and goals as of June 17, 2015

Süleyman Orazov (Turkmen: Süleýman Orazow; born 2 January 1989) is a Turkmen footballer playing for FC Aşgabat of the Ýokary Liga as a midfielder. He received his first national team cap against Guam on 11 June 2015.

== Club career ==
From 2015 to 2019, he played for FC Ahal. His current club is FC Aşgabat.

== International career ==
Played for Turkmenistan in the Asian Games 2010.

Orazow made his senior national team debut on 11 June 2015, in a 2018 FIFA World Cup qualification – AFC second round match against Guam.
