= 2014 Turkmenistan Cup =

Tournament details
- Country: Turkmenistan
- Teams: 10

Final positions
- Champions: FC Ahal
- Runners-up: Balkan FT

The 2014 Turkmenistan Cup was the 2014 edition of the Turkmenistan Cup. The cup winner qualified for the 2015 AFC Cup.

== Preliminary round ==
Preliminary Round involves 2 teams. Games played on 1 and 5 August 2014.

Team 1	Agg.	Team 2	1st leg	2nd leg
Daşoguz	2-0	Talyp Sporty	2-0	0-0

== Quarter-finals ==
Team 1	Agg.	Team 2	1st leg	2nd leg
Ahal	5-0	Daşoguz	4-0	1-0
Merw	0-3	Şagadam	0-2	0-1
Altyn Asyr	1-4	HTTU	1-2	0-2
Aşgabat	0-4	Balkan	0-1	0-3

== Semi-finals ==
Semi-finals involves 2 teams. Games played on 7 and 10 October 2014.

Team 1	Agg.	Team 2	1st leg	2nd leg
Ahal	4-2	Şagadam	3-0	1-2
HTTU	1-4	Balkan	1-1	0-3

== Final ==
28.10.2014
15:00

FC Ahal	3–2	Balkan FT
Gurban Annaýew 5'; Rahmet Şermetow 74'; Didar Hajyýew 89'	Report	Maksim Belyh 14' (own goal); Myrat Yagşyýew 18'

Sport toplumy, Dashoguz
