= Turkmen State Institute of Economics and Management =

University in Ashgabat, Turkmenistan

Coordinates: 37.8991°N 58.3681°E

- Türkmen döwlet ykdysadyýet we dolandyryş instituty
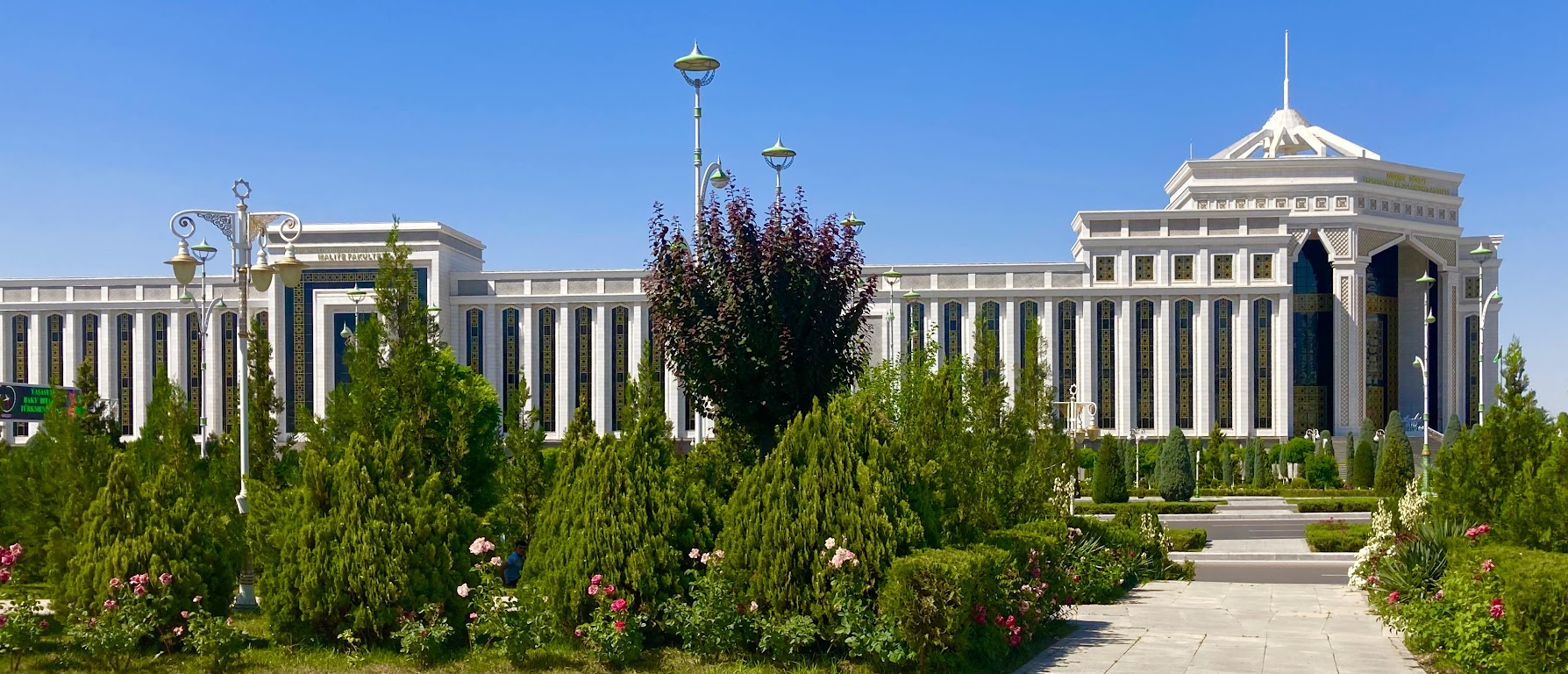
- Established: 1980
- Students: 3,000
- Location: 10 yyl Abadanchylyk street Ashgabat; Turkmenistan, Ashgabat, Turkmenistan
- Campus: Urban
- Website: tsiem.edu.tm

The Turkmen State Institute of Economics and Management (Turkmen: Türkmen döwlet ykdysadyýet we dolandyryş instituty) is one of the major universities of Turkmenistan, located in Ashgabat. Formerly named Turkmen Institute of National Economy (1980–2009), the university is the largest Turkmen economic institute of higher education.

Makhammetgeldi Annaamanov, a graduate of the university is now the current rector.

== History ==
Turkmen Institute of National Economy was founded in 1980 on January 31, based on the Faculty of Economics of the Turkmen State University and named Turkmen Institute of National Economy.

On April 14, 2008, it was renamed the Turkmen State Institute of Economics and Management.

Already in the first year of high school, the new status of the joint statement was signed between the Ministry of Economy and Development and the Federal Ministry of Economics and Technology of Germany on cooperation in to enhance the management skills of national cadres in the field of economics. The institute established faculty training organized by the Faculty of short-term courses.

== Building ==
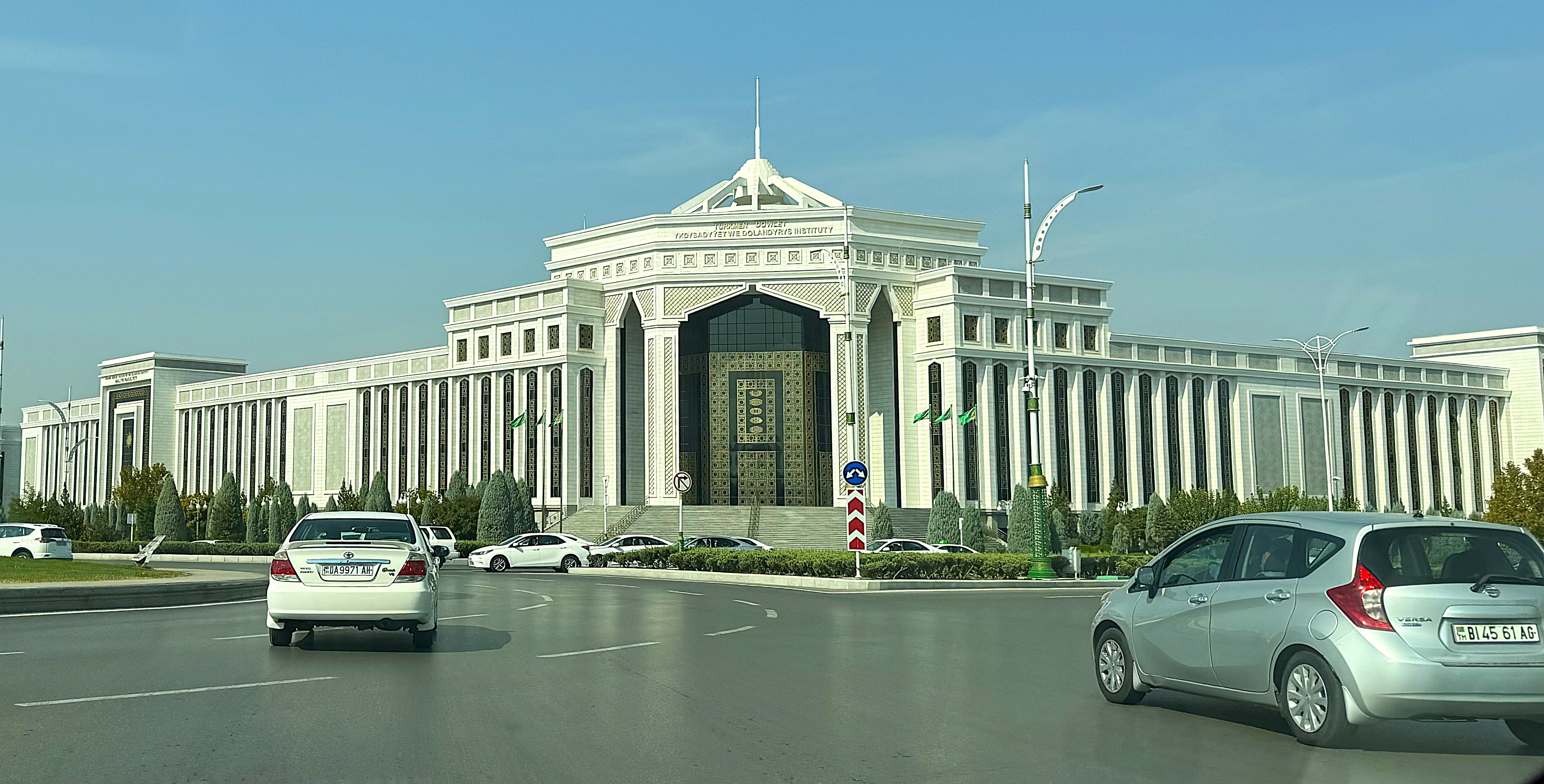
Main building

The new building opened on September 27, 2012, with the participation of President of Turkmenistan Gurbanguly Berdimuhamedov.

The building can accommodate three thousand students. The institute is equipped with modern technology classrooms, a conference hall for 660 seats, a showroom, an electronic library with reading rooms for 430 readers, language laboratories for the study of foreign languages. The lecture rooms are equipped with interactive whiteboards.

=== Hostel ===
Not far from the main building of the university are two hostels for 425 people.

=== Sports complex ===
Operates a sports complex, with sports hall for basketball, volleyball, boxing, and national sports, swimming pool, and a stadium with open playgrounds.

== Faculties ==
- Economics
- Finance
- Management
- Marketing
- Professional Development

=== Departments ===
Economics, Accounting, Economic Analysis and Audit Statistics, Economics and Law, Finance, Banking, Public Science, Economic Informatics, Management, Information Systems, Foreign languages, Marketing, Labor Economics, Advanced Mathematics, Physical Education.

== Sport ==
In 2015, the Turkmen State Institute of Economics and Management team created the football club FC Hazyna, speaking in various competitions among students and then among the masters.

The university has a basketball team, "Hazyna", which is one of the best in the country, they participate in several leagues. They play in division 1 for the men's basketball league of Turkmenistan and for division 1 men's university basketball. The team has the best prospects for the national team as Guseyn Ishankuliyev, Sapaly Zayirov, Rustam Bagshiyev, Merdan, Rowshen, Annaveliyev Didar and Zakir Pishik Chardgoudan. Results of the team:

- 2012 – University division 1 champions
- 2014–2015 – University division 1 2nd-place winners
- 2016 – University division 1 champions

== Results from International Olympiads ==
Students of Turkmen State Institute of Economics and Management started participating in International Statistic Olympiad in 2014 held in Iran. In 2014 team of Turkmen State Institute of Economics and Management earned the 5th place. In 2015 Team of Turkmen State Institute of Economics and Management got 2nd place in the 2nd International Statistic Olympiad held in Iran, Hemedan. Members of team in 2015: Magtymguly Atayev (third year student at faculty of Marketing), Meylis Altyyev (4th year student at faculty of Finance), Kurbanbay Jumakulyyev (3rd year student at faculty of Economics), Soltanmyrat (4th year student at faculty of Economics) and Serdar (3rd student at faculty of Economics). They very Thanks to, Arkadag, President of Turkmenistan Gurbanguly Berdimuhamedov. President of Turkmenistan Gurbanguly Berdimuhamedov, gave them very unforgettable advantages in their lives. Let the God's will give him very strong health.

Magtymguly Atayev was as an exchange student at the Economy faculty, University of Ljubljana in 2015–2016 academic year. He tries everything what he wants. He never gives up until his final result. He loves work harder and to get the highest outcome.

== Links ==
- Page in Academy of Sciences of Turkmenistan
- History
- Turkmen Institute of National Economy (TINE)
- TSIEM at TuCHAEA
