= Starion =

1985 video game

- Engine: Amstrad CPC
- Release: 1985

Starion was a 1985 video game for the Amstrad CPC.

== Reception ==
Fred Reid for Commodore User said "I am not saying that Starion doesn't have its strengths. Its just that Elite has now set the standard for these types of deep space, adventure shoot 'em ups, and anything new that isn't as good just doesn't stand a chance." Amstrad User made it their game of the month and said "It's not often I'm amazed by a new program for the Amstrad machines [...] but I am truly amazed by Starion." Crash said that "Starion is Melbourne's answer to Elite. A CBM expert was seen openly weeping when he saw the quality of the graphics compared to the CBM Elite, and with very good reason." Amtix gave the game 92% and called it "A realty slick and enjoyable game." Amstrad Action said that "Outstanding graphics and gameplay make this another winner for the down-under software house." Clare Edgelty for Sinclair User gave the game 4 stars and said "Starion can be viewed either as a light educational adventure in time or purely as an arcade game. Whatever view, it's well worth buying if only for the pleasure of turning history upside down." Zzap gave the game 45%.
