= Guwançmuhammet Öwekow =

Turkmen footballer and manager

Guvanchmukhammed Ovekov
- Guwançmuhammet Öwekow

President of the Football Federation of Turkmenistan
- Incumbent
- Assumed office 4 November 2024
- Preceded by: Guwanç Garajaýew

Personal details
- Born: Guwançmuhammet Saparmuhammedowiç Öwekow; 2 February 1981 (age 45) Aşgabat, Turkmen SSR, Soviet Union (now Turkmenistan)
- Occupation: Footballer; manager; sports administrator
Association football career
- Height: 1.74 m (5 ft 9 in)
- Positions: Midfielder; striker
Senior career*
Years	Team	Apps	(Gls)
2000–2001	Nisa Aşgabat	?	(?)
2002–2004	Arsenal Kyiv	12	(1)
2002	→ CSKA Kyiv (loan)	5	(1)
2002–2003	→ Borysfen Boryspil (loan)	9	(1)
2003	→ CSKA Kyiv (loan)	7	(1)
2003	→ Arsenal-2 Kyiv	1	(0)
2004	→ Vorskla Poltava (loan)	9	(1)
2005	Navbahor Namangan	21	(2)
2006	Zorya Luhansk	27	(1)
2007	Kharkiv	24	(0)
2008	Zhetysu	18	(4)
2009	Navbahor Namangan	13	(0)
2010	Xorazm Urganch	22	(1)
2011–2013	Nebitçi Balkanabat	?	(?)
2014	Ahal	?	(?)
International career^{‡}
2003–2010	Turkmenistan	23	(9)
Managerial career
- 2014: Ahal
- 2023: FK Arkadag
- * Club domestic league appearances and goals as of 08 November 2024 ‡ National team caps and goals as of 08 November 2024

Guvanchmukhammed Saparmukhammedovich Ovekov (Turkmen: Guwançmuhammet Saparmuhammedowiç Öwekow; born February 2, 1981) is a former professional Turkmen football player and manager. Öwekow played as a striker for Arsenal Kyiv, CSKA Kyiv, Borysfen Boryspil, Vorskla Poltava, Navbahor Namangan, Zorya Luhansk, Kharkiv, Zhetysu, Khorazm, Nebitçi, Ahal, Nisa and the Turkmenistan national team. In November 2024, Öwekow was elected President of the Football Federation of Turkmenistan.

== Playing career ==
=== Club ===
Guvenchmukhamed Ovekov was born in Ashgabat. He began his career with Turkmen club SMM+.

He played for the Ashgabat club Nisa. During the 2000 Commonwealth of Independent States Cup in Moscow, his performance caught the attention of several Ukrainian clubs. He caught the attention of the coaching staff of CSKA Kyiv, which led him to move to Ukraine. He went on to compete in the Ukrainian Championship, representing Arsenal Kyiv, Borysfen, Vorskla, Zorya, and Kharkiv. Additionally, he played for the Uzbek clubs Navbahor and Khorezm.

Öwekow has experience competing in futsal. In 2007, he became the Turkmenistan Futsal Championship winner with the team Asudalyk. Recognized as the best player and top scorer of the tournament, Öwekow scored 11 goals throughout the competition. In the final match, Asudalyk overcame a two-goal deficit to defeat IPS Motors 5-4, securing the club's first national championship title.

In 2008, he joined the Taldykorgan-based club Zhetysu, where he contributed to the team's sixth-place finish in the Kazakhstan Premier League, appearing in 18 matches and scoring 4 goals. Öwekow played for a Kazakh club as a midfielder.

At the start of 2009, he returned to Navbahor, where he had previously played in the 2005–2006 season.

In 2011, Ovekov returned to Turkmenistan, signing with FC Balkan from Balkanabat. He helped the team win the Turkmenistan Super Cup, scoring a crucial goal in the 84th minute. That season, he also celebrated a championship victory with the club. In the 2011 AFC President's Cup, FC Balkan advanced to the final stage but was narrowly defeated by Taiwan Power Company F.C. (3:4).

In 2013, he played for FC Altyn Asyr.

His final club was FC Ahal, and upon retiring as a player, he joined the coaching staff.

== International career ==
Guwançmuhammet Öwekow has played 22 games for the Turkmenistan national football team between 2003 and 2010, scoring 9 goals. He made his debut for the national team on October 30, 2003, in a 1–1 match against the United Arab Emirates, coming on as a substitute for Didargylyç Urazow in the 53rd minute.

He represented Turkmenistan in the 2004 AFC Asian Cup held in China PR, where he played in three matches: against Saudi Arabia, Iraq, and Uzbekistan. He also participated in the 2006 and 2010 World Cup qualifiers, scoring 4 goals across these campaigns.

Guwançmuhammet Öwekow participated in the largest ever win for Turkmenistan, a match at home against Afghan national football team in which Öwekow scored two of Turkmenistan's eleven goals. Five years later, Ovekov made another record against the same opponent, as he scored four goals during the 5–0 win over the Afghans during a 2008 AFC Challenge Cup group stage match.

== Coaching career ==
He has been coach of FC Ahal from 2014, led the club to the silver in 2014 Ýokary Liga. He also shortly coached FK Arkadag in 2023.

== Football administration ==
Öwekow was elected president of Football Federation of Turkmenistan on 4 November 2024. In February 2025, Öwekow was re-elected as chairman for another four-year term.

== Club career statistics ==
Last update: 9 March 2008

Season	Team	Country	Division	Apps	Goals
2001	Nisa Aşgabat	Turkmenistan	1	??	??
01/02	FC Arsenal Kyiv	Ukraine	1	6	1
02/03	FC Arsenal Kyiv	Ukraine	1	3	0
03/04	FC Arsenal Kyiv	Ukraine	1	3	0
03/04	FC Vorskla Poltava	Ukraine	1	9	1
2005	Navbahor Namangan	Uzbekistan	1	21	2
2006	Navbahor Namangan	Uzbekistan	1	??	??
06/07	FC Zorya Luhansk	Ukraine	1	12	1
06/07	FC Kharkiv	Ukraine	1	12	0
07/08	FC Kharkiv	Ukraine	1	12	0
2008	FC Zhetysu	Kazakhstan	1	18	4

== International career statistics ==
=== Goals for Senior National Team ===
#	Date	Venue	Opponent	Score	Result	Competition
1.	November 19, 2003	Ashgabat, Turkmenistan	Afghanistan	11–0	Won	2006 FIFA World Cup qualification
2.	November 19, 2003	Ashgabat, Turkmenistan	Afghanistan	11–0	Won	2006 FIFAWorld Cup qualification
3.	February 18, 2004	Ashgabat, Turkmenistan	Sri Lanka	2–0	Won	2006 FIFA World Cup qualification
4.	June 14, 2008	Ashgabat, Turkmenistan	South Korea	1–3	Lost	2010 FIFA World Cup Qualification
5.	August 1, 2008	Hyderabad, India	Afghanistan	5–0	Won	2008 AFC Challenge Cup
6.	August 1, 2008	Hyderabad, India	Afghanistan	5–0	Won	2008 AFC Challenge Cup
7.	August 1, 2008	Hyderabad, India	Afghanistan	5–0	Won	2008 AFC Challenge Cup
8.	August 1, 2008	Hyderabad, India	Afghanistan	5–0	Won	2008 AFC Challenge Cup
9.	October 22, 2009	Ho Chi Minh City, Vietnam	Singapore	2–4	Lose	FIFA Friendly match

== Achievements ==
Nisa

- Turkmenistan Champion: 2001

Balkan

- Turkmenistan Champion: 2011
- Turkmenistan Super Cup Winner: 2011

Zorya

- Winner of the Ukrainian First League: 2005–06

Borysfen

- Runner-up of the Ukrainian First League: 2002–03

=== Managerial honors ===
Ahal

- Turkmenistan Championship runners-up: 2014
- Turkmenistan Cup: 2014
- Turkmenistan Super Cup: 2014
- Turkmenistan Super Cup runner-up: 2015
