= Rovshen Meredov =

Turkmenistan football manager (born 1982)

Personal information
- Date of birth: 24 August 1982 (age 44)
- Place of birth: Balkanabat, Turkmen SSR, Soviet Union
- Position: Forward

Team information
- Current team: Turkmenistan (Head coach)

Youth career
- Balkanabat Sports School

Senior career*
Years	Team	Apps	(Gls)
1999–?	Nebitchi		
- Dagdan
- Galkan
- Ahal
?–2013	ITTU		

Managerial career
- 2013–2016: ITTU (Yedigen)
- 2016–2020: Ahal
- 2020: Qizilqum
- 2022: Kaganat
- 2025–: Turkmenistan
- * Club domestic league appearances and goals

Rovshen Meredov (Turkmen: Röwşen Meredow; born 24 August 1982) is a Turkmenistani football manager and former player who is the head coach of the Turkmenistan national football team.

He holds a UEFA Pro License and is also a technical expert for FIFA.

== Early life and education ==
Meredov was born on 24 August 1982 in Balkanabat, Turkmen SSR. He began his football education at the youth sports school in Balkanabat under the guidance of coach Valery Revazovich Tskitishvili.

While pursuing his professional football career, Meredov attended Turkmen State University, graduating with a degree in law in 2003.

== Playing career ==
Meredov began his professional playing career in 1999 with Nebitchi. Over a 14-year career, he played as a forward for several clubs in the Ýokary Liga (Turkmenistan Higher League), including Dagdan, Galkan, Ahal, and ITTU (later renamed Yedigen). He retired from professional play in 2013 to focus on coaching.

== Coaching career ==
=== Club career ===
Upon retiring in 2013, Meredov took up coaching roles within the Ýokary Liga. His first major managerial success came with ITTU, leading the club to an international title by winning the 2014 AFC President's Cup.

He subsequently managed Ahal FC, establishing them as a dominant force in domestic football. Under his leadership, Ahal won the Turkmenistan Cup in 2017 and achieved three silver medal finishes in the national league championship.

Meredov later expanded his experience abroad. In 2020, he managed Qizilqum in the Uzbekistan Super League. In March 2022, he was appointed as the head coach of FC Kaganat in the Kyrgyz Premier League,.

=== National team ===
On 26 May 2025, the Football Federation of Turkmenistan appointed Meredov as the head coach of the Turkmenistan national football team, succeeding Mergen Orazov.

== Administrative and technical roles ==
In addition to coaching, Meredov is deeply involved in the technical development of football. Since 2020, he has served as a technical expert for FIFA, contributing to global football development initiatives led by Arsène Wenger.

In early 2025, prior to his appointment as national team coach, Meredov was named the head of the Technical Department (Technical Director) of the Football Federation of Turkmenistan. In this capacity, he oversaw youth football, women's football, futsal, and coaching education.

== Honours ==
=== Manager ===
ITTU

- AFC President's Cup: 2014

Ahal

- Turkmenistan Cup: 2017
