= Ahal FK =

Turkmen association football club

Ahal
- Full name: Türkmennebit Döwlet Konserniniň Türkmennebitönümleri Baş Müdirliginiň Ahal Änew Futbol Kluby
- Founded: 1989; 37 years ago
- Ground: Ashgabat Stadium
- Capacity: 20,000
- Chairman: Gurbandurdy Öwekow
- Manager: Eziz Annamuhammedow
- League: Ýokary Liga
- 2025: Yokary Liga, 2nd of 8
Home colours	Away colours

Ahal Änew Football Club (Turkmen: Ahal Änew Futbol Kluby), or simply Ahal FK, is a Turkmen professional football club based in the Änew, Ahal Province. Founded in 1989, the club played its first-ever top flight season in 1992. The club plays its home matches at the 20,000 seater Ashgabat Stadium.

Ahal won the 2022 Ýokary Liga, becoming one of eight clubs to have won the league since its inception in 1992.

== History ==
During 1989–91, Ahal Änew participated in the Soviet Second League. Ahal Änew played in the top division of Turkmenistan in 1992, winning bronze medal, but the following year the team was disbanded. The returning season was 1998–99.

During the 1990s and 2000s, as Arvana FK, Ahal Änew played non-professional football in the Änew region.

=== First silverware ===
On 28 October 2013, head coach Ali Gurbani guided Ahal Änew to win the 2013 Turkmenistan Cup where they beat Altyn Asyr to win the cup for the first time in the club history. In the 2014 season, Ahal Änew began by winning the 2014 Turkmenistan Super Cup beating HTTU Aşgabat 4–2 . In October 2014, a new coach was appointed, Guwançmuhammet Öwekow where he helped the club to resulted in a victory in the 2014 Turkmenistan Cup, beating Balkan 2–1 on 28 October 2014.

=== AFC Cup debut ===
Ahal Änew debuted in the 2015 AFC Cup. In the second qualifying round, the club defeated Omani Fanja SC, earning the right to participate in the group stage. In September 2015, Boris Grigorýanc was appointed as head coach, replacing Guwançmuhammet Öwekow who left the position voluntarily.

Between 2016 and 2019, Rovshen Meredov served as head coach. From 2019 to 2020, the role was held by Said Seýidow. In 2021, Hojaahmet Arazow took over. In 2021, Mergen Orazov was appointed as the manager of Ahal. In the 2021 Ýokary Liga, Ahal was runner-up in the championship for the 7th time and qualified for the 2022 AFC Champions League. Only Ahal were granted an AFC Champions League license, as the Ýokary Liga champions FC Altyn Asyr were eligible for the 2022 AFC Cup.

In 2022, under the leadership of Mergen Orazov, Ahal became Turkmenistan champion for the first time in its history. Ahal also won the Turkmenistan Cup and the Football Federation of Turkmenistan Cup. Ahal has unveiled a new logo ahead of the 2024 Ýokary Liga season. The updated design features a minimal color scheme, with the emblem showcasing the Txrkmennebitönumleri sponsor's symbol and the club's founding year, 1989. Under Welsähet Öwezow, FC Ahal finished second in the 2024 season. In the 2025 season, FC Ahal qualified for the 2025–26 AFC Champions League Two group stage, having beaten the Tajik club Regar-TadAZ (2:1) in the qualifying play-offs.

One Ahal FK finished the 2025 Turkmenistan Football League as runners-up which see the club qualified to the 2026–27 AFC Challenge League group stage.

Before the start of the new 2026 Ýokary Liga season, Eziz Annamuhammedow took over as head coach of the team.

== Current squad ==
As of 17 October 2026

Note: Flags indicate national team as defined under FIFA eligibility rules; some limited exceptions apply. Players may hold more than one non-FIFA nationality.

No.	Pos.	Nation	Player
1	GK	TKM	Ybraýym Annageldiýew
2	DF	TKM	Döwran Berdiýew
4	DF	TKM	Beglimuhammet Bekmyradow
5	DF	TKM	Hakmuhammet Bäşimow
6	MF	TKM	Nazar Towakelow
7	MF	TKM	Begenç Mämiýew
8	MF	TKM	Ýakupmuhammet Gowşudow
9	FW	TKM	Pirmyrat Sultanow
10	FW	TKM	Magtymberdi Berenow
11	FW	TKM	Suleýman Mirzoýew
12	DF	TKM	Aşyr Jumadurdyýew
13	MF	TKM	Bäşim Gurbanberdiýew
14	MF	TKM	Annamyrat Meredow
15	MF	TKM	Maksat Ilmyradow
16	GK	TKM	Maksat Suwhanow
17	FW	TKM	Enwer Annaýew
18	DF	TKM	Ýolmämmet Garajaýew
19	FW	TKM	Yslam Annamyradow
20	FW	TKM	Medetgeldi Çaryýew

No.	Pos.	Nation	Player
21	DF	TKM	Oraz Orazow
22	DF	TKM	Azat Rahmanow
25	GK	TKM	Wepa Mammaýew
27	MF	TKM	Nurtagan Saryýew
30	DF	TKM	Begenç Orazmuhammedow
31	GK	TKM	Muhammet Öwezow
33	DF	TKM	Perman Bekmämedow
70	FW	TKM	Gurbanmuhammet Esenow
77	MF	TKM	Amir Gurbani
95	DF	TKM	Ruslan Priýew
97	DF	TKM	Şazada Bäşimow
98	MF	TKM	Döwran Hojamämmedow
--	DF	TKM	Mekan Muhammedow
--	DF	TKM	Ybraýym Allakow
--	DF	TKM	Didar Nazjanow
--	DF	TKM	Oraz Ataýew
--	DF	TKM	Berdimyrat Daňatarow
--	DF	TKM	Gurbangeldi Garajaýew
--	MF	TKM	Azat Annaýew
--	MF	TKM	Döwletgeldi Çaryýew
--	MF	TKM	Begenç Agajumaýew
--	MF	TKM	Kerwen Nasyrow

== Domestic ==
Season	League									Turkmenistan Cup	Top goalscorer		Head coach/manager
Season	Div.	Pos.	Pl.	W	D	L	GS	GA	P	Turkmenistan Cup	Name	League	Head coach/manager
1992	1st	3	28	22	2	4	103	16	46				
1998–99	1st	8	32	5	4	23	14	74	19				
2000	1st	5	20	8	5	7	22	24	29				
2001	1st	8	32	5	3	24	31	93	18				
2002	1st	9	32	2	3	27	17	102	9				
2003	1st	9	36	7	1	28	25	96	22				
2004	1st	7	36	11	5	20	24	64	38				
2005	1st	9	32	6	6	20	37	72	24				(Turkmenistan) Armen Sogomonyan (Turkmenistan) Ali Gurbani
2008	1st	10	20	1	1	18	12	68	4				(Turkmenistan) Durdy Redzhepov
2009	2nd									First round			
2010	1st	8	18	5	1	12	13	33	16	Quarter-final			
2011	1st	8	36	9	4	23	40	83	31	Quarter-final			(Turkmenistan) Armen Sogomonyan
2012	1st	4	32	15	5	12	59	45	50	First round	(Turkmenistan) Didar Durdyýew	14	(Turkmenistan) Baýram Durdyýew (Turkmenistan) Ahmet Agamyradow
2013	1st	6	36	16	8	12	62	41	56	Winners			(Turkmenistan) Ali Gurbani
2014	1st	2	36	28	3	5	85	24	87	Winners			(Turkmenistan) Ali Gurbani (Turkmenistan) Guwançmuhammet Öwekow
2015	1st	5	36	16	10	10	67	54	58	Quarter-final			(Turkmenistan) Guwançmuhammet Öwekow; Boris Grigorýants
2016	1st	4	36	18	8	10	63	42	62	Quarter-final			
2017	1st	2	32	22	6	4	70	21	72	Winners			
2018	1st	2	28	18	6	4	55	22	60	Semi-final			
2019	1st	2	28	15	9	4	44	17	54	Final	(Turkmenistan) Didar Durdyýew	14	(Turkmenistan) Röwşen Meredow (Turkmenistan) Amangylyç Koçumow (Turkmenistan) Baýramnyýaz Berdiýew
2020	1st	2	28	17	4	7	54	29	55	Semifinal	(Turkmenistan) Elman Tagaýew	16	
2021	1st	2	14	8	5	1	25	11	29	Final	(Turkmenistan) Elman Tagaýew	10	
2022	1st	1	28	23	4	1	89	21	73	Winners	(Turkmenistan) Didar Durdyýew	27	

== Continental history ==
As of match played 22 April 2021

Competition	Pld	W	D	L	GF	GA
AFC Cup	20	10	3	7	30	23
AFC Champions League	6	1	1	4	6	9
Total	26	11	4	11	36	32

Season	Competition	Round	Club	Home	Away	Aggregate
2015	AFC Cup	Preliminary round	(Kyrgyzstan) Dordoi Bishkek	3–0	–	3–0
2015	AFC Cup	Preliminary round	(Oman) Fanja	–	3–2	3–2
2015	AFC Cup	Group D	(Kuwait) Qadsia	0–1	0–2	4th
2015	AFC Cup	Group D	(Tajikistan) Istiklol	1–2	2–5	4th
2015	AFC Cup	Group D	(Iraq) Erbil	2–1	3–2	4th
2018	AFC Cup	Group D	(Tajikistan) Istiklol	0–1	0–1	3rd
2018	AFC Cup	Group D	(Turkmenistan) Altyn Asyr	0–0	0–1	3rd
2018	AFC Cup	Group D	(Kyrgyzstan) Alay	5–0	3–2	3rd
2019	AFC Cup	Preliminary round	(Kyrgyzstan) Alay	1–0	2–1	3–1
2019	AFC Cup	Preliminary round	(Tajikistan) Khujand	1–1	0–0	1–1(a)
2020	AFC Cup	Preliminary round	(Kyrgyzstan) Alay	—	—	w/o
2021	AFC Cup	Group E	(Kyrgyzstan) Dordoi Bishkek	2–0		1st
2021	AFC Cup	Group E	(Tajikistan) Ravshan	3–1		1st
2021	AFC Cup	West Asia Zone final	(Uzbekistan) Nasaf	2–3	–	2–3
2022	AFC Champions League	Group C	(Iran) Foolad	0–1	0–1	4th
2022	AFC Champions League	Group C	(Qatar) Al-Gharafa	4–2	0–2	4th
2022	AFC Champions League	Group C	(United Arab Emirates) Shabab Al Ahli	1–1	2–1	4th

== Honours ==
- Turkmenistan Higher League
  - Champions (1): 2022
  - Runners-up (8): 2014, 2017, 2018, 2019, 2020, 2021, 2024, 2025
- Turkmenistan Cup
  - Champions (4): 2013, 2014, 2017, 2022
  - Runners-up (2): 2019, 2021, 2023
- Turkmenistan Super Cup
  - Champions (1): 2014
  - Runners-up (3): 2015, 2018, 2020

== Corporate hierarchy ==
Position	Name
Chairman	(Turkmenistan) Gurbandurdy Öwekow
Chairman	(Turkmenistan) Sähetmyrat Aliýew
Administrator	(Turkmenistan) Çarymämmet Orazmämmedow
Administrator	(Turkmenistan) Agajan Orazmyradow
Administrator	(Turkmenistan) Begençhmuhammet Kuliýew
Administrator	(Turkmenistan) Konstantin Grigorýans

== Managers/coaches ==
- (Turkmenistan) Amangylyç Koçumow (2000)
- (Turkmenistan) Armen Sogomonyan (2005)
- (Turkmenistan) Ali Gurbani (2005)
- (Turkmenistan) Durdy Redzhepov (2008)
- (Turkmenistan) Armen Sogomonyan (2011)
- (Turkmenistan) Baýram Durdyýew (2012)
- (Turkmenistan) Ali Gurbani (2013–14)
- (Turkmenistan) Guwançmuhammet Öwekow (2014–N/A)
- (Turkmenistan) Röwşen Meredow (September 2016 – September 2019)
- (Turkmenistan) Amangylyç Koçumow (September 2019 – October 2019)
- (Turkmenistan) Baýramnyýaz Berdiýew (November 2019 – January 2020)
- (Turkmenistan) Hojaahmet Arazow (January 2020 – August 2020)
- (Turkmenistan) Said Seýidow (August 2020 – December 2020)
- (Turkmenistan) Mergen Orazov (January 2021 – December 2022)
- (Turkmenistan) Serdar Geldiýew (January 2023 – April 2024)
- (Turkmenistan) Döwletmyrat Annaýew (April 2024 – June 2024)
- (Turkmenistan) Welsähet Öwezow (June 2024 – December 2025)
- (Turkmenistan) Eziz Annamuhammedow (January 2026 – )

== Kit suppliers and shirt sponsors ==
The club is owned by the Main Department Türkmennebitönumleri (Turkmen Petroleum Products) of the State Concern Türkmennebit.

Period	Kit supplier	Shirt sponsor
2018–2020	Nike	TNÖ
2021	Jako	TNÖ
2022	Nike	TNÖ
2023–2024	Hummel	TNÖ, Dragon Oil

== Stadiums ==
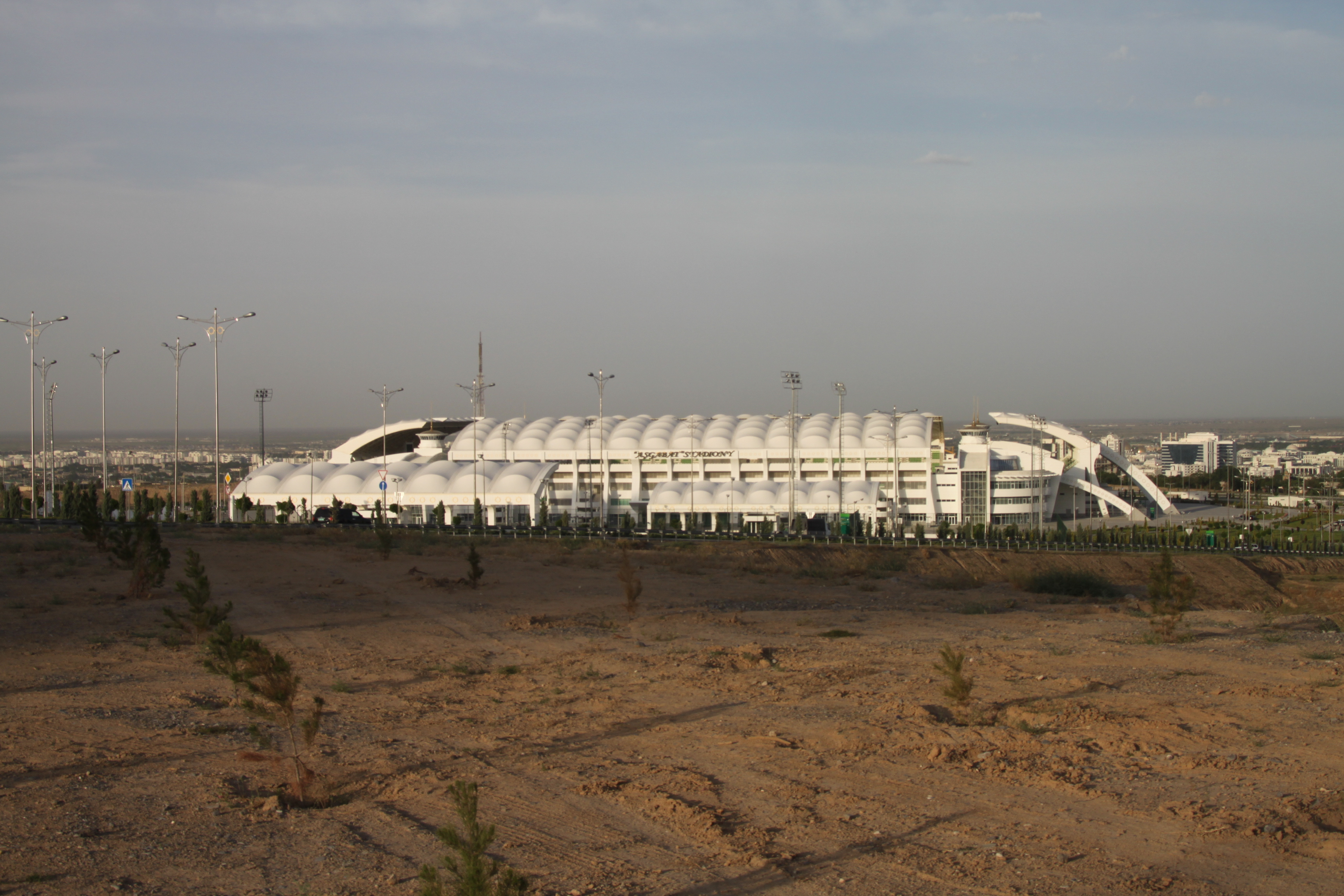
Ashgabat Stadium in Aşgabat city

Nusaý Stadium and Ashgabat Stadium in Aşgabat city is use as home ground of the club at Ýokary Liga matches. Ashgabat Stadium also hosted AFC Cup, AFC Champions League matches.
