= Amangylyç Koçumow =

Turkmen footballer and coach

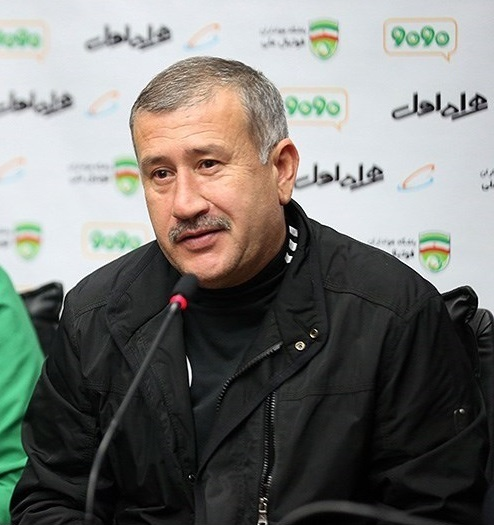
- Koçumow in press conference before match with Iran

Personal information
- Full name: Amangylych Ovezovich Kochumov
- Date of birth: 24 July 1965 (age 61)
- Place of birth: Ashkhabad, Turkmen SSR, USSR (now Turkmenistan)
- Position: Midfielder

Senior career*
Years	Team	Apps	(Gls)
1988–1989	Köpetdag Aşgabat	34	(2)
1989–1991	FC Ahal	77	(14)
1991	Nebitchi	10	(7)
1992	FC Ahal		
1993	Buzmeyin		
1995	Turan		
1998–1999	Köpetdag Aşgabat		

Managerial career
- 2000: FC Ahal
- 2000: FC Galkan
- 2001–2011: Turkmenistan U-16
- 2005: Turkmenistan
- 2008–2015: FC Aşgabat
- 2011–2016: Turkmenistan U-23
- 2015–2016: Turkmenistan
- 2016–2019: FC Aşgabat
- 2019: FC Ahal
- 2020–2022: Nebitchi
- * Club domestic league appearances and goals

Amangylych Ovezovich Kochumov or Amangylyç Owezowiç Koçumow (Russian: Аманклыч Овезович Кочумов, romanized: Amanklych Ovezovich Kochumov; born 24 July 1965) is a Turkmen football coach and a former Soviet footballer.

== Playing career ==
In 1988–1989 he played for FC Kopetdag. In 1989–1991 he played for FC Ahal.

In 1992, in the 1st round of the championship of the independent Turkmenistan has scored 5 goals to FC Sport Büzmeýin. Then, for 20 rounds he scored 22 more goals. In 1993, he played for FC Büzmeýin.

In 1994–1999 he played for FC Turan (was his captain), FC Eskawatorşik, FC Merw, FC Kopetdag.

== Managing career ==
Coaching career began in late 1999 in FC Ahal. In 2000 led a team Interior Ministry of Turkmenistan FC Galkan, brought team to the Ýokary Liga. Since 2001, the senior coach of Football School of the Olympic reserve of Turkmenistan and the head coach of the Junior national team.

Under the coaching of Koçumow on International Youth Games of the CIS and Baltic States in 2002 in Moscow, the National team of Turkmenistan, entered the top eight. Behind this success was awarded the title Honored coach of Turkmenistan.

In 2005, he was the acting head coach of Turkmenistan national football team. Team had only one game, in which the Turkmenistan team conceded Bahrain (0:5).

Since 2008 he has headed FC Ashgabat.

In 2011, he headed the Olympic team of Turkmenistan.

In 2015, he was appointed head coach of Turkmenistan national football team, the post combines with the work of the Olympic team. Managet national team until 2016 year. Turkmenistan national football team, Turkmenistan national under-23 football team.

In July, he was dismissed from his post as head coach of the FC Aşgabat.

In September 2019, he was appointed head coach of FC Ahal.

In August 2020, he headed the Nebitchi team.
