= FC Aşgabat =

Aşgabat
- Full name: Aşgabat Futbol Kluby
- Nickname: Şäherliler
- Founded: 2006; 20 years ago
- Ground: Nisa Stadium, Ashgabat, Turkmenistan
- Capacity: 3,000
- Chairman: Çaryýarguly Seýdiýew
- Manager: Döwletmyrat Annaýew
- League: Ýokary Liga
- 2025: Ýokary Liga, 6th of 8
Home colours	Away colours

Ashgabat Futbol Kluby is a Turkmen professional football club based in Ashgabat. They play in the top division of Turkmenistan football, Ýokary Liga. Their home stadium is Nisa Stadium. The club was first founded in 2006, they finished 3rd in their debut year under famous manager Ali Gurbani, who left the club following the home loss to Turan Dasoguz. After Rahym Gurbanmämmedow took charge, the club clinched their first title in 2007.

== History ==
The first season in the Ýokary Liga FC Ashgabat started under the leadership of coach Ali Gurbani. However, in mid-season, after the defeat of the outsider FC Turan, he was dismissed.

In place of Ali Gurbani came Rahym Kurbanmämmedow, with whom the club won the bronze medal in 2006. The following year Kurbanmämmedow led team to the championship title. The club first won the right to represent Turkmenistan in the 2008 Commonwealth of Independent States Cup, and the third largest Asian club tournament AFC President's Cup.

In July 2008 FC Ashgabat took the Supercup of Turkmenistan, beating by penalties Şagadam FK. At the end of the 2008 season the club won the championship again, also led by coach Kurbanmämmedow.

In 2012 the team took last place in the 2013 Ýokary Liga and continued to perform under the new guidance of Amangylyç Koçumow.

In August 2019 Saýid Seýidow has been appointed as coach of the FC Aşgabat. However, Seýidow was replaced by returning coach Koçumow.

=== Domestic ===
Season	League									Turkmenistan Cup	Top goalscorer		Manager
Season	Div.	Pos.	Pl.	W	D	L	GS	GA	P	Turkmenistan Cup	Name	League	Manager
2006	1st	3	28	14	6	8	40	24	48				(Turkmenistan) Ali Gurbani (Turkmenistan) Rahym Kurbanmämmedow
2007	1st	1	28	19	4	5	44	14	61				(Turkmenistan) Rahym Kurbanmämmedow
2008	1st	1	20	16	4	0	48	4	52		(Turkmenistan) Berdi Şamyradow (Turkmenistan) Mämmedaly Garadanow	11	(Turkmenistan) Rahym Kurbanmämmedow (Turkmenistan) Amangylyç Koçumow
2009	1st	4	16	9	2	5	24	24	29	Quarter-final	(Turkmenistan) Berdi Şamyradow	18	(Turkmenistan) Amangylyç Koçumow
2010	1st	6	18	7	5	6	29	19	26	First round	(Turkmenistan) Berdi Şamyradow	11	(Turkmenistan) Amangylyç Koçumow
2011	1st	3	36	23	4	9	79	41	72	Runner-up			(Turkmenistan) Amangylyç Koçumow
2012	1st	9	32	5	4	23	28	80	19	First round			(Turkmenistan) Amangylyç Koçumow
2013	1st	4	36	20	4	12	76	52	64		(Turkmenistan) Elman Tagayev	22	(Turkmenistan) Amangylyç Koçumow
2014	1st	7	36	13	7	16	57	47	46				(Turkmenistan) Amangylyç Koçumow
2015	1st	3	36	18	5	13	57	42	59	Quarter-final	(Turkmenistan) Berdi Şamyradow		(Turkmenistan) Amangylyç Koçumow (Turkmenistan) Tofik Şukurow
2016	1st	6	36	14	10	12	43	38	52	Runner-up			
2017	1st	5	32	13	6	13	32	44	45	Quarterfinal			(Turkmenistan) Tofik Şukurow
2018	1st	7	28	7	6	15	23	41	27	Quarterfinal			
2019	1st	6	28	8	7	13	29	44	31	Semifinal			(Turkmenistan) Amangylyç Koçumow (Turkmenistan) Said Seýidow
2020	1st	5	28	10	6	12	35	45	36	Quarterfinal			(Turkmenistan) Said Seýidow (Turkmenistan) Döwletmyrat Annaýew

=== Continental ===
Season	Competition	Round	Club	Home	Away	Aggregate
2008	CIS Cup	Group stage	(Russia) Zenit Saint Petersburg	2–1		4th
2008	CIS Cup	Group stage	(Moldova) Sheriff Tiraspol	0–4		4th
2008	CIS Cup	Group stage	(Estonia) Levadia Tallinn	0–1		4th
2008	AFC President's Cup	Group stage	(Myanmar) Kan Baw Za	0–1		1st
2008	AFC President's Cup	Group stage	(Bhutan) Transport United	7–1		1st
2008	AFC President's Cup	Group stage	(Sri Lanka) Ratnam SC	2–0		1st
2008	AFC President's Cup	Semi-final	(Tajikistan) Regar-TadAZ	3–4		
2009	CIS Cup	Group stage	Russia U21	0–0		4th
2009	CIS Cup	Group stage	(Belarus) MTZ-RIPO Minsk	0–4		4th
2009	CIS Cup	Group stage	(Lithuania) Ekranas	1–3		4th
2009	AFC President's Cup	Group stage	Sri Lanka Army	5–1		1st
2009	AFC President's Cup	Group stage	(Bangladesh) Abahani Limited	0–0		1st
2009	AFC President's Cup	Semi-final	(Kyrgyzstan) Dordoi-Dynamo Naryn	1–2		

== Squad ==
As of 16 March 2020

Note: Flags indicate national team as defined under FIFA eligibility rules; some limited exceptions apply. Players may hold more than one non-FIFA nationality.

No.	Pos.	Nation	Player
1	GK	TKM	Gurbanmyrat Garaýew
3	MF	TKM	Atageldi Geldiýew
5	MF	TKM	Azat Şamyradow
6	MF	TKM	Nazar Towakelow
9	FW	TKM	Nurýagdy Muhammedow
10	MF	TKM	Myratgeldi Gurbangeldiýew
12	DF	TKM	Saparmyrat Öwezow
13	DF	TKM	Bäşim Gurbanberdiýew

No.	Pos.	Nation	Player
15	DF	TKM	Baýjan Satlykow
17	FW	TKM	Sahupnazar Durdyýew
19	MF	TKM	Döwran Berdiýew
21	MF	TKM	Orazmuhammet Işangulyýew
26	MF	TKM	Batyr Täçnazarow
27	MF	TKM	Süleýman Orazow
30	MF	TKM	Boris Iwanow
39	DF	TKM	Myrat Amantaganow

== Honours ==
- Turkmenistan League
  - Champions (2): 2007, 2008
- Turkmenistan Super Cup
  - Winners (1): 2007

== Managers ==
- (Turkmenistan) Amangylyç Koçumow (2016–2019)
- (Turkmenistan) Said Seýidow (2019–2020)
- (Turkmenistan) Döwletmyrat Annaýew (2020–present)
