= Football Federation of Turkmenistan =

Governing body of association football in Turkmenistan

AFC
- Short name: FFT
- Founded: 1992; 34 years ago
- Headquarters: Ashgabat, Turkmenistan
- FIFA affiliation: 16 June 1994; 31 years ago
- AFC affiliation: 30 April 1993; 33 years ago
- CAFA affiliation: 2015; 11 years ago
- President: Guwançmuhammet Öwekow
- General Secretary: Serdar Geldiýew
- Website: www.tff.com.tm

The Football Federation of Turkmenistan (Turkmen: Türkmenistanyň Futbol Federasiýasy; TFF) is the governing body of football and futsal in Turkmenistan. It is responsible for the national team, as well as club competitions

== History ==
The Federation was founded in 1992 and in 1994 was admitted to FIFA, which registers all the matches of the national teams of all member countries. The national team of Turkmenistan registered their first matches as being held in 1992, and FIFA counted those matches on the basis that, although the Football Federation of Turkmenistan became a member of FIFA on 16 June 1994, the national team of Turkmenistan was allowed since 1992 to participate in tournament play. The Federation additionally boasts membership in the Asian Football Confederation since May 1994.

In May 2003 Football Federation of Turkmenistan held a special conference. As a result of a secret ballot, Allaberdy Mammetkuliyev was elected chairman. The Football Federation of Turkmenistan was transformed into an Association.

In March 2007, FIFA President Joseph S. Blatter and AFC President Mohamed Bin Hammam opened the House of Football - new headquarters of the Football Association of Turkmenistan - which is located in one of the luxury houses in the southern part of Ashgabat.

The May 2008 election saw just one nomination for the position of Chairman: Deryageldy Orazov.

The May 2012 election saw another change in leadership, as Vice Premier Sapardurdy Toylyev was unanimously voted chairman by the delegates present. Additionally, the conference adopted a new logo.

In 2015, Turkmenistan joined the Central Asian Football Association.

== Association staff ==
Name	Position	Source
(Turkmenistan) Guwançmuhammet Öwekow	President	
(Turkmenistan) Gulmyrat Agamyradow	Vice-president	
(Turkmenistan) Şatlyk Orazgylyjow	2nd Vice-president	
(Turkmenistan) Serdar Geldiýew	General Secretary	
(Turkmenistan) Owadan Annaorazowa	Financial Director	
(Turkmenistan) Rovshen Meredov	Technical director	
(Turkmenistan) Rovshen Meredov	Team coach (men's)	
(Turkmenistan) Kamil Mingazow	Team coach (women's)	
(Turkmenistan) Orazgeldi Geldiýew	Media/communications manager	
(Turkmenistan) Guwanç Kanaýew	Futsal Coordinator	
(Turkmenistan) Wadim Baratow	Referee coordinator	

== Domestic competitions ==
Leagues (men)

- Ýokary Liga
- Birinji Liga

Leagues (youth)

- Türkmenistanyň futbol boýunça ýaşlar birinjiligi (Turkmenistan Youth Football Championship)

Cups (men)

- Turkmenistan Cup
- Turkmenistan Super Cup
- Football Federation of Turkmenistan Cup

Leagues (women)

- Turkmenistan Women's Championship

== National team ==
Men's

- Senior National Football Team
- National Football Team U-23
- National Football Team U-20
- National Football Team U-21
- National Football Team U-19
- National Football Team U-17

Women's

- Senior National Football Team
