= AFC President's Cup and AFC Challenge League records and statistics =

This page details statistics of all seasons of the AFC Challenge League and AFC President's Cup. These statistics do not include the qualifying rounds of the AFC Challenge League.

== General performances ==
=== By club ===
Performances in the AFC President's Cup and AFC Challenge League by club
Club	Title(s)	Runners-up	Season won	Season runner-up
(Tajikistan) Regar-TadAZ	3	0	2005, 2008, 2009	—
(Kyrgyzstan) Dordoi Bishkek	2	4	2006, 2007	2005, 2008, 2009, 2010
(Myanmar) Yadanarbon	1	0	2010	—
(Chinese Taipei) Taiwan Power Company	1	0	2011	—
(Tajikistan) Istiklol	1	0	2012	—
(Turkmenistan) Balkan	1	0	2013	—
(Turkmenistan) HTTU Aşgabat	1	0	2014	—
(Turkmenistan) Arkadag	1	0	2024–25	—
Al-Kuwait	1	0	2025–26	—
(Cambodia) PKR Svay Rieng	0	2	—	2024–25, 2025–26
(Tajikistan) Vakhsh Qurghonteppa	0	1	—	2006
Nepal Police	0	1	—	2007
(Cambodia) Phnom Penh Crown	0	1	—	2011
(Palestine) Markaz Shabab Al-Am'ari	0	1	—	2012
(Pakistan) KRL	0	1	—	2013
(North Korea) Rimyongsu	0	1	—	2014

=== By nation ===
Nation	Winners	Runners-up	Winning clubs	Runners-up
Tajikistan	4	1	Regar-TadAZ (3); Istiklol (1)	Vakhsh Qurghonteppa (1)
Turkmenistan	3	0	Arkadag (1); Balkan (1); HTTU Aşgabat (1)	—
Kyrgyzstan	2	4	Dordoi Bishkek (2)	Dordoi Bishkek (4)
Myanmar	1	0	Yadanarbon (1)	—
Chinese Taipei	1	0	Taiwan Power Company (1)	—
Cambodia	0	3	—	PKR Svay Rieng (2); Phnom Penh Crown (1)
Nepal	0	1	—	Nepal Police (1)
North Korea	0	1	—	Rimyongsu (1)
Pakistan	0	1	—	KRL (1)
Palestine	0	1	—	Markaz Shabab Al-Am'ari (1)

=== All-time points table ===
Following statistical convention in football, matches decided in extra time are counted as wins and losses, while matches decided by penalty shoot-outs are counted as draws. Teams are ranked by total points, then by goal difference, then by goals scored. Only the top twenty are listed (excludes qualifying rounds).

As of end of 2025–26 season

Rank	Club	Seasons	Pld	W	D	L	GF	GA	GD	Pts	FW	F	SF
1	(Kyrgyzstan) Dordoi Bishkek	8	39	26	5	8	115	31	+84	83	2	4	
2	(Tajikistan) Regar-TadAZ	5	22	13	6	3	59	22	+37	45	3		1
3	(Chinese Taipei) Taiwan Power Company	6	21	9	6	4	31	28	+3	35	1		
4	(Cambodia) Phnom Penh Crown	5	22	10	1	11	42	48	–6	31		1	
5	(Cambodia) PKR Svay Rieng	3	17	8	3	6	42	30	+12	27		2	
6	(Turkmenistan) Balkan	3	13	8	2	3	31	12	+19	26	1		
7	(Tajikistan) Istiklol	2	10	7	2	1	25	6	+19	23	1		
8	(Pakistan) KRL	4	16	7	4	5	22	17	+5	22		1	
9	(Turkmenistan) HTTU Aşgabat	2	9	6	2	1	20	7	+13	20	1		1
10	(Myanmar) Shan United	4	13	6	1	6	34	28	+6	19			
11	(Tajikistan) Vakhsh Qurghonteppa	2	9	6	0	3	20	9	+11	18		1	1
12	(Turkmenistan) Arkadag	1	8	6	0	2	14	8	+6	18	1		
13	(Kuwait) Al-Arabi	2	10	5	3	2	15	12	+3	18			1
14	(Myanmar) Yadanabon	2	9	5	2	2	27	16	+11	17	1		1
15	(Bangladesh) Abahani Limited Dhaka	5	14	4	5	5	12	14	–2	17			
16	Nepal Police	5	18	4	5	9	26	32	–6	17		1	1
17	Al-Kuwait	1	6	5	1	0	17	10	+7	16	1		
18	(Oman) Al-Seeb	2	8	4	2	2	16	8	+8	14			
19	(Sri Lanka) Ratnam	3	10	4	2	4	23	16	+7	14			1
20	(Kyrgyzstan) Neftchi Kochkor-Ata	1	5	4	0	1	14	4	+10	12			

=== Participating clubs ===
A total of 58 clubs from 24 national associations have played in or qualified for the AFC President's Cup and AFC Challenge League group stage. Season in bold represents teams qualified for the knockout phase that season. Between 2011 and 2014, qualification is considered from the second group stage.

Nation	#	Clubs	Years
Turkmenistan (6)	3	Balkan	**2011**, 2012, **2013**
Turkmenistan (6)	2	Aşgabat	**2008**, **2009**
Turkmenistan (6)	2	HTTU Aşgabat	**2010**, **2014**
Turkmenistan (6)	1	Arkadag	**2024–25**
Turkmenistan (6)	1	Altyn Asyr	2025–26
Turkmenistan (6)	1	Ahal	2026–27
Sri Lanka (6)	3	Ratnam	2006, **2007**, 2008
Sri Lanka (6)	2	Sri Lanka Army SC	2009, 2013
Sri Lanka (6)	1	Blue Star	**2005**
Sri Lanka (6)	1	Renown	2010
Sri Lanka (6)	1	Don Bosco	2011
Sri Lanka (6)	1	Sri Lanka Air Force SC	**2014**
Chinese Taipei (5)	6	Taiwan Power Company	2005, 2008, 2009, **2011**, **2012**, 2013
Chinese Taipei (5)	3	Tatung	**2006**, 2007, 2014
Chinese Taipei (5)	2	Tainan City	**2024–25**, 2025–26, 2026–27
Chinese Taipei (5)	1	Hasus TSU	2010
Chinese Taipei (5)	1	New Taipei Hang Yuan	2026–27
Cambodia (5)	5	Phnom Penh Crown	2005, 2009, **2011**, **2012**, **2025–26**
Cambodia (5)	3	PKR Svay Rieng	2014, **2024–25**, **2025–26**
Cambodia (5)	2	Khemara Keila	**2006**, 2007
Cambodia (5)	2	Nagacorp	2008, 2010
Cambodia (5)	1	Boeung Ket Rubber Field	2013
Bhutan (5)	4	Transport United	2005, 2006, 2007, 2008
Bhutan (5)	4	Yeedzin	2009, 2011, 2012, 2013
Bhutan (5)	3	Paro	2024–25, 2025–26, 2026–27
Bhutan (5)	1	Druk Star	2010
Bhutan (5)	1	Ugyen Academy	2014
Nepal (4)	5	Nepal Police	**2007**, **2008**, 2009, 2011, 2012
Nepal (4)	2	Manang Marshyangdi	2006, **2014**
Nepal (4)	2	Three Star Club	**2005**, **2013**
Nepal (4)	1	New Road Team	2010
Kyrgyzstan (4)	8	Dordoi Bishkek	**2005**, **2006**, **2007**, **2008**, **2009**, **2010**, **2012**, **2013**
Kyrgyzstan (4)	2	Abdysh-Ata Kant	2024–25, 2025–26
Kyrgyzstan (4)	1	Neftchi Kochkor-Ata	**2011**
Kyrgyzstan (4)	1	Muras United	**2025–26**
Bangladesh (4)	5	Abahani Limited Dhaka	2008, 2009, 2010, 2011, 2013
Bangladesh (4)	2	Bashundhara Kings	2024–25, 2025–26
Bangladesh (4)	1	Sheikh Russel	**2014**
Bangladesh (4)	1	Fortis	2026–27
Tajikistan (3)	6	Regar-TadAZ	**2005**, **2007**, **2008**, **2009**, 2025–26, 2026–27
Tajikistan (3)	3	Istiklol	**2011**, **2012**, 2026–27
Tajikistan (3)	2	Vakhsh Qurghonteppa	**2006**, **2010**
Pakistan (3)	4	KRL	2010, **2012**, **2013**, 2014
Pakistan (3)	4	WAPDA	2005, 2008, **2009**, 2011
Pakistan (3)	2	Pakistan Army	2006, 2007
Myanmar (3)	4	Shan United	2008, 2009, **2024–25**, 2025–26, 2026–27
Myanmar (3)	2	Yadanabon	**2010**, **2011**
Myanmar (3)	1	Yangon United	2026–27
Palestine (3)	2	Hilal Al-Quds	**2013**, 2024–25
Palestine (3)	1	Jabal Al Mukaber	2011
Palestine (3)	1	Markaz Shabab Al-Am'ari	**2012**
Philippines (3)	2	Manila Digger	**2025–26**, 2026–27
Philippines (3)	1	Global	2013
Philippines (3)	1	Ceres-La Salle	2014
Lebanon (3)	2	Nejmeh	2024–25, 2026–27
Lebanon (3)	2	Al Ansar	**2025–26**, 2026–27
Lebanon (3)	1	Safa	2025–26
Kuwait (3)	2	Al-Arabi	**2024–25**, 2025–26, 2026–27
Kuwait (3)	1	Al-Kuwait	**2025–26**
Kuwait (3)	1	Al-Qadsia	2026–27
Indonesia (3)	1	Madura United	**2024–25**
Indonesia (3)	1	Dewa United Banten	**2025–26**
Indonesia (3)	1	Borneo Samarinda	2026–27
Syria (3)	1	Al-Fotuwa	2024–25
Syria (3)	1	Homs Al Fidaa	2026–27
Syria (3)	1	Al Ittihad Ahli	2026–27
Mongolia (2)	3	Erchim	2012, **2013**, **2014**
Mongolia (2)	2	SP Falcons	2024–25, 2025–26
Oman (2)	2	Al-Seeb	**2024–25**, 2025–26
Oman (2)	1	Al-Shabab	**2025–26**
Laos (2)	1	Young Elephants	2024–25
Laos (2)	1	Ezra	2025–26
India (2)	1	East Bengal	**2024–25**
India (2)	1	Goa	2026–27
North Korea (1)	1	Rimyongsu	**2014**
Bahrain (1)	1	Al-Ahli	2024–25
Maldives (1)	1	Maziya	2024–25
Brunei (1)	1	Kasuka	2026–27

== Player ==
=== Best player award ===
Season	Player	Club
2005	N/A	N/A
2006	N/A	N/A
2007	(Kyrgyzstan) Valery Kashuba	(Kyrgyzstan) Dordoi-Dynamo
2008	N/A	N/A
2009	(Tajikistan) Khurshed Mahmudov	(Tajikistan) Regar-TadAZ
2010	(Kyrgyzstan) Mirlan Murzayev	(Kyrgyzstan) Dordoi-Dynamo
2011	(Chinese Taipei) Chen Po-liang	(Chinese Taipei) Taiwan Power Company
2012	(Tajikistan) Alisher Tuychiev	(Tajikistan) Istiklol
2013	(Turkmenistan) Amir Gurbani	(Turkmenistan) Balkan
2014	(Turkmenistan) Suleyman Muhadow	(Turkmenistan) HTTU Asgabat
2024–25	(Turkmenistan) Şanazar Tirkişow	(Turkmenistan) Arkadag
2025–26	(Egypt) Amoory	Al-Kuwait

=== Goalscoring ===
==== Top scorers by season ====
Season	Player(s)	Club(s)	Goals
2005	(Cambodia) Hok Sochetra	(Cambodia) Hello United	4
2005	(Sri Lanka) Dudley Steinwall	(Sri Lanka) Blue Star	4
2005	(Tajikistan) Khurshed Mahmudov	(Tajikistan) Regar-TadAZ	4
2005	(Tajikistan) Dzhomikhon Mukhidinov	(Tajikistan) Regar-TadAZ	4
2006	(Chinese Taipei) Chuang Yao-tsung	(Chinese Taipei) Tatung	5
2006	(Kyrgyzstan) Roman Kornilov	(Kyrgyzstan) Dordoi-Dynamo	5
2007	(Sri Lanka) Channa Ediri Bandanage	(Sri Lanka) Ratnam	6
2008	(Myanmar) Thi Ha Kyaw	(Myanmar) Kanbawza	6
2009	(Myanmar) Soe Min Oo	(Myanmar) Kanbawza	6
2010	(Tajikistan) Rustam Usmonov	(Tajikistan) Vakhsh Qurghonteppa	5
2011	(Chinese Taipei) Ho Ming-tsan	(Chinese Taipei) Taiwan Power Company	6
2012	(Kyrgyzstan) Mirlan Murzayev	(Kyrgyzstan) Dordoi Bishkek	8
2013	(Kyrgyzstan) Mirlan Murzayev	(Kyrgyzstan) Dordoi Bishkek	9
2014	(Turkmenistan) Süleýman Muhadow	(Turkmenistan) HTTU Aşgabat	11
2024–25	(Turkmenistan) Altymyrat Annadurdyýew	(Turkmenistan) Arkadag	5
2025–26	(Ghana) Kwame Peprah	(Cambodia) PKR Svay Rieng	8

==== All-time top goalscorers ====
Rank	Player	Club(s)	Goals
1	(Kyrgyzstan) Mirlan Murzayev	Dordoi Bishkek	19
2	(Kyrgyzstan) David Tetteh	Dordoi Bishkek	12
3	(Tajikistan) Khurshed Makhmudov	Regar-TadAZ	11
3	(Turkmenistan) Süleýman Muhadow	HTTU Aşgabat	11
5	(Turkmenistan) Amir Gurbani	Aşgabat, Balkan	10
5	(Sri Lanka) Channa Ediri Bandanage	Ratnam	10
5	(Tajikistan) Ibrahim Rabimov	Regar-TadAZ, Istiklol	10
8	(Pakistan) Kaleemullah Khan	KRL	9
9	(Turkmenistan) Arslanmyrat Amanow	Aşgabat, HTTU Aşgabat	8
9	(Myanmar) Yan Paing	Yadanarbon	8
9	(Nepal) Ju Manu Rai	Nepal Police	8
9	(Ghana) Kwame Peprah	PKR Svay Rieng	8

=== Hat-tricks ===
As of 16 April 2026

Key
^{4}	Player scored four goals
^{5}	Player scored five goals

Hat-tricks scored in the AFC President's Cup and AFC Challenge League
Player	For	Against	Result	Date	Ref.
(Tajikistan) Dzhomikhon Mukhidinov	(Tajikistan) Regar-TadAZ	(Bhutan) Transport United	6–1	4 May 2005	
(North Korea) Ung-chon Choe	(Cambodia) Khemara Keila	(Chinese Taipei) Tatung	5–1	13 June 2006	
(Chinese Taipei) Chuang Yao-tsung	(Chinese Taipei) Tatung	(Bhutan) Transport United	5–1	14 June 2006	
(Tajikistan) Khurshed Makhmudov^{5}	(Tajikistan) Regar-TadAZ	(Bhutan) Transport United	13–0	20 September 2007	
(Sri Lanka) Channa Ediri Bandanage^{5}	(Sri Lanka) Ratnam	(Bhutan) Transport United	6–1	22 September 2007	
(Kyrgyzstan) Roman Kornilov^{4}	(Kyrgyzstan) Dordoi-Dynamo	(Chinese Taipei) Tatung	5–0	25 September 2007	
(Sri Lanka) Channa Ediri Bandanage	(Sri Lanka) Ratnam	(Bhutan) Transport United	7–1	23 April 2008	
(Turkmenistan) Arslanmyrat Amanow	(Turkmenistan) Aşgabat	(Bhutan) Transport United	7–1	25 April 2008	
(Myanmar) Thi Ha Kyaw	(Myanmar) Kanbawza	(Bhutan) Transport United	11–0	25 April 2008	
(Myanmar) Tun Min Oo^{4}	(Myanmar) Kanbawza	(Bhutan) Transport United	11–0	27 April 2008	
(Nepal) Ju Manu Rai	Nepal Police	(Bangladesh) Abahani Limited Dhaka	4–0	22 June 2008	
(Myanmar) Soe Min Oo	(Myanmar) Kanbawza	(Cambodia) Phnom Penh Crown	4–3	10 June 2009	
(Kyrgyzstan) Mirlan Murzayev^{4}	(Kyrgyzstan) Dordoi-Dynamo	(Bhutan) Yeedzin	7–0	10 June 2009	
(Turkmenistan) Berdi Şamyradow^{4}	(Turkmenistan) HTTU Aşgabat	(Bhutan) Druk Star	8–0	9 May 2010	
(Tajikistan) Rustam Usmonov	(Tajikistan) Vakhsh Qurghonteppa	(Sri Lanka) Renown	6–0	10 May 2010	
(Myanmar) Paing Soe^{4}	(Myanmar) Yadanabon	(Bhutan) Druk Star	11–0	11 May 2010	
(Myanmar) Yan Paing	(Myanmar) Yadanabon	(Bhutan) Druk Star	11–0	11 May 2010	
(Cambodia) Teab Vathanak	(Cambodia) Nagacorp	(Sri Lanka) Renown	4–2	12 May 2010	
(Russia) Yuri Volos	(Kyrgyzstan) Dordoi-Dynamo	(Nepal) New Road Team	3–0	14 May 2010	
(Myanmar) Pai Soe	(Myanmar) Yadanabon	(Bhutan) Yeedzin	6–0	13 May 2011	
(Tajikistan) Farkhod Tokhirov^{4}	(Tajikistan) Istiklol	(Bhutan) Yeedzin	8–0	15 May 2011	
(Ghana) Awudu Ibrahim	(Bangladesh) Abahani Limited Dhaka	(Sri Lanka) Don Bosco	4–1	25 May 2011	
(Uzbekistan) Pavel Pavlov	(Kyrgyzstan) Neftchi Kochkor-Ata	(Myanmar) Yadanabon	8–2	23 September 2011	
(Cambodia) Khim Borey	(Cambodia) Phnom Penh Crown	(Bhutan) Yeedzin	8–0	5 May 2012	
(Kyrgyzstan) Mirlan Murzayev	(Kyrgyzstan) Dordoi Bishkek	Nepal Police Club	5–1	5 May 2012	
(Kyrgyzstan) Mirlan Murzayev^{5}	(Kyrgyzstan) Dordoi Bishkek	(Bhutan) Yeedzin	11–2	7 May 2012	
(Kyrgyzstan) Azamat Baymatov	(Kyrgyzstan) Dordoi Bishkek	(Cambodia) Phnom Penh Crown	8–0	26 September 2012	
(Cambodia) Chan Vathanaka^{4}	(Cambodia) Boeung Ket Rubber Field	Sri Lanka Army	6–0	6 May 2013	
(Palestine) Roberto Kettlun	(Palestine) Hilal Al-Quds	Sri Lanka Army	10–0	8 May 2013	
(Kyrgyzstan) Mirlan Murzayev^{5}	(Kyrgyzstan) Dordoi Bishkek	(Bhutan) Yeedzin	9–0	10 May 2013	
(Pakistan) Kaleemullah Khan^{5}	(Pakistan) KRL	(Bhutan) Yeedzin	8–0	12 May 2013	
(Kyrgyzstan) Mirlan Murzayev^{4}	(Kyrgyzstan) Dordoi Bishkek	(Philippines) Global	6–1	12 May 2013	
(Turkmenistan) Süleýman Muhadow	(Turkmenistan) HTTU Aşgabat	(Nepal) Manang Marshyangdi	3–1	22 September 2014	
(Brazil) Cristian Roque	(Cambodia) PKR Svay Rieng	(Myanmar) Shan United	6–2	6 March 2025	
(Ghana) Kwame Peprah	(Cambodia) PKR Svay Rieng	(Cambodia) Phnom Penh Crown	4–1	5 March 2026	

== Coach ==
=== Winning coaches ===
Season	Winning Coach	Club(s)
2005	(Tajikistan) Makhmadjon Khabibulloev	(Tajikistan) Regar TadAZ
2006	(Kyrgyzstan) Boris Podkorytov	(Kyrgyzstan) Dordoi-Dynamo
2007	(Kyrgyzstan) Boris Podkorytov	(Kyrgyzstan) Dordoi-Dynamo
2008	(Tajikistan) Makhmadjon Khabibulloev	(Tajikistan) Regar TadAZ
2009	(Tajikistan) Makhmadjon Khabibulloev	(Tajikistan) Regar TadAZ
2010	(Myanmar) U Zaw Lay Aung	(Myanmar) Yadanarbon
2011	(Chinese Taipei) Chen Kuei-jen	(Chinese Taipei) Taiwan Power Company
2012	(Serbia) Nikola Kavazović	(Tajikistan) Istiklol
2013	(Turkmenistan) Rahym Kurbanmämmedow	(Turkmenistan) Balkan
2014	(Turkmenistan) Begench Garayev	(Turkmenistan) HTTU Aşgabat
2024–25	(Turkmenistan) Akhmet Allaberdiyev	(Turkmenistan) Arkadag
2025–26	(Montenegro) Nebojša Jovović	Al-Kuwait

=== Coaches with multiple titles ===
Rank	Coach	Nationality	Number of wins	Season won	Club(s)
1	Makhmadjon Khabibulloev	Tajikistan	3	2005, 2008, 2009	Regar TadAZ
2	Boris Podkorytov	Kyrgyzstan	2	2006, 2007	Dordoi-Dynamo

=== By nationality ===
This table lists the total number of titles won by managers of each country.

Nationality	Number of wins
Tajikistan	3
Turkmenistan	3
Kyrgyzstan	2
Chinese Taipei	1
Montenegro	1
Myanmar	1
Serbia	1

== See also ==
- Asian Club Championship and AFC Champions League Elite records and statistics
- AFC Cup and AFC Champions League Two records and statistics
- List of world association football records
