= Asian Club Championship and AFC Champions League Elite records and statistics =

This page details statistics of the AFC Champions League Elite (previously known as the Asian Club Champion Tournament, Asian Club Championship, and the AFC Champions League). These statistics do not include the qualifying rounds unless otherwise noted.

== General performances ==
=== Asian Club Championship and AFC Champions League ===
==== Titles by club ====
A total of twenty four clubs have won the tournament since its 1967 inception, with Al Hilal being the only team to win it four times. Clubs from ten countries have provided tournament winners. South Korean clubs have been the most successful, winning a total of twelve titles.

Performances in the Asian Club Championship and AFC Champions League Elite by club
| Club | Title(s) | Runners-up | Seasons won | Seasons runner-up |
|---|---|---|---|---|
| (Saudi Arabia) Al-Hilal | 4 | 5 | 1991, 1999–2000, 2019, 2021 | 1986, 1987, 2014, 2017, 2022 |
| (South Korea) Pohang Steelers | 3 | 1 | 1996–97, 1997–98, 2009 | 2021 |
| (Japan) Urawa Red Diamonds | 3 | 1 | 2007, 2017, 2022 | 2019 |
| (Iran) Esteghlal | 2 | 2 | 1970, 1990–91 | 1991, 1998–99 |
| (South Korea) Seongnam FC | 2 | 2 | 1995, 2010 | 1996–97, 2004 |
| (United Arab Emirates) Al Ain | 2 | 2 | 2002–03, 2023–24 | 2005, 2016 |
| (Saudi Arabia) Al-Ahli | 2 | 2 | 2024–25, 2025–26 | 1985–86, 2012 |
| (Saudi Arabia) Al-Ittihad | 2 | 1 | 2004, 2005 | 2009 |
| (South Korea) Jeonbuk Hyundai Motors | 2 | 1 | 2006, 2016 | 2011 |
| (Israel) Maccabi Tel Aviv | 2 | 0 | 1969, 1971 | — |
| (Qatar) Al-Sadd | 2 | 0 | 1988–89, 2011 | — |
| (Thailand) Thai Farmers Bank | 2 | 0 | 1993–94, 1994–95 | — |
| (South Korea) Suwon Samsung Bluewings | 2 | 0 | 2000–01, 2001–02 | — |
| (South Korea) Ulsan HD | 2 | 0 | 2012, 2020 | — |
| (China) Guangzhou | 2 | 0 | 2013, 2015 | — |
| (Japan) Júbilo Iwata | 1 | 2 | 1998–99 | 1999–2000, 2000–01 |
| (Israel) Hapoel Tel Aviv | 1 | 1 | 1967 | 1970 |
| (China) Liaoning | 1 | 1 | 1989–90 | 1990–91 |
| (South Korea) Busan IPark | 1 | 0 | 1985–86 | — |
| (Japan) JEF United Chiba | 1 | 0 | 1986 | — |
| (Japan) Tokyo Verdy | 1 | 0 | 1987 | — |
| (Iran) PAS Tehran | 1 | 0 | 1992–93 | — |
| (Japan) Gamba Osaka | 1 | 0 | 2008 | — |
| (Australia) Western Sydney Wanderers | 1 | 0 | 2014 | — |
| (Japan) Kashima Antlers | 1 | 0 | 2018 | — |
| (Japan) Yokohama F. Marinos | 0 | 2 | — | 1989–90, 2023–24 |
| (South Korea) FC Seoul | 0 | 2 | — | 2001–02, 2013 |
| (Iran) Persepolis | 0 | 2 | — | 2018, 2020 |
| (Malaysia) Selangor | 0 | 1 | — | 1967 |
| (South Korea) Yangzee | 0 | 1 | — | 1969 |
| (Iraq) Aliyat Al-Shorta | 0 | 1 | — | 1971 |
| (Iraq) Al-Rasheed | 0 | 1 | — | 1988–89 |
| (Saudi Arabia) Al-Shabab | 0 | 1 | — | 1992–93 |
| Oman Club | 0 | 1 | — | 1993–94 |
| (Qatar) Al-Arabi | 0 | 1 | — | 1994–95 |
| (Saudi Arabia) Al-Nassr | 0 | 1 | — | 1995 |
| (China) Dalian Shide | 0 | 1 | — | 1997–98 |
| (Thailand) Police Tero | 0 | 1 | — | 2002–03 |
| (Syria) Al-Karamah | 0 | 1 | — | 2006 |
| (Iran) Sepahan | 0 | 1 | — | 2007 |
| (Australia) Adelaide United | 0 | 1 | — | 2008 |
| (Iran) Zob Ahan | 0 | 1 | — | 2010 |
| (United Arab Emirates) Shabab Al-Ahli | 0 | 1 | — | 2015 |
| (Japan) Kawasaki Frontale | 0 | 1 | — | 2024–25 |
| (Japan) Machida Zelvia | 0 | 1 | — | 2025–26 |

==== Titles by nation ====
| Country | Winners | Runners-up | Winning clubs | Runners-up |
|---|---|---|---|---|
| South Korea | **12** | 7 | Pohang Steelers (3); Seongnam FC (2); Suwon Samsung Bluewings (2); Jeonbuk Hyundai Motors (2); Ulsan HD (2); Busan IPark (1) | Seongnam FC (2); FC Seoul (2); Jeonbuk Hyundai Motors (1); Yangzee (1); Pohang Steelers (1) |
| Saudi Arabia | **8** | 10 | Al-Hilal (4); Al-Ittihad (2); Al-Ahli (2) | Al-Hilal (5); Al-Ahli (2); Al-Ittihad (1); Al-Nassr (1); Al-Shabab (1) |
| Japan | **8** | 7 | Urawa Red Diamonds (3); JEF United Chiba (1); Tokyo Verdy (1); Gamba Osaka (1); Júbilo Iwata (1); Kashima Antlers (1) | Júbilo Iwata (2); Yokohama F. Marinos (2); Urawa Red Diamonds (1); Kawasaki Frontale (1); Machida Zelvia (1) |
| Iran | **3** | 6 | Esteghlal (2); PAS Tehran (1) | Esteghlal (2); Persepolis (2); Sepahan (1); Zob Ahan (1) |
| China | **3** | 2 | Guangzhou (2); Liaoning (1) | Liaoning (1); Dalian Shide (1) |
| Israel | **3** | 1 | Maccabi Tel Aviv (2); Hapoel Tel Aviv (1) | Hapoel Tel Aviv (1) |
| United Arab Emirates | **2** | 3 | Al-Ain (2) | Al-Ain (2); Shabab Al-Ahli (1) |
| Qatar | **2** | 1 | Al-Sadd (2) | Al-Arabi (1) |
| Thailand | **2** | 1 | Thai Farmers Bank (2) | Police Tero (1) |
| Australia | **1** | 1 | Western Sydney Wanderers (1) | Adelaide United (1) |
| Iraq | 0 | 2 | — | Aliyat Al-Shorta (1); Al-Rasheed (1) |
| Malaysia | 0 | 1 | — | Selangor (1) |
| Oman | 0 | 1 | — | Oman Club (1) |
| Syria | 0 | 1 | — | Al-Karamah (1) |

==== Titles by city ====
| City | Winners | Runners-up | Winning clubs | Runners-up |
|---|---|---|---|---|
| (Saudi Arabia) Riyadh | **4** | 7 | Al-Hilal (4) | Al-Hilal (5); Al-Shabab (1); Al-Nassr (1) |
| (Saudi Arabia) Jeddah | **4** | 3 | Al-Ittihad (2); Al-Ahli (2) | Al-Ahli (2); Al-Ittihad (1) |
| (Iran) Tehran | **3** | 4 | Esteghlal (2); PAS Tehran (1) | Esteghlal (2); Persepolis (2) |
| (Israel) Tel Aviv | **3** | 1 | Maccabi Tel Aviv (2); Hapoel Tel Aviv (1) | Hapoel Tel Aviv (1) |
| (South Korea) Pohang | **3** | 1 | Pohang Steelers (3) | Pohang Steelers (1) |
| (Japan) Saitama | **3** | 1 | Urawa Red Diamonds (3) | Urawa Red Diamonds (1) |
| (United Arab Emirates) Al Ain | **2** | 2 | Al-Ain (2) | Al-Ain (2) |
| (Thailand) Bangkok | **2** | 1 | Thai Farmers Bank (2) | BEC Tero Sasana (1) |
| (Qatar) Doha | **2** | 1 | Al-Sadd (2) | Al-Arabi (1) |
| (South Korea) Jeonju | **2** | 1 | Jeonbuk Hyundai Motors (2) | Jeonbuk Hyundai Motors (1) |
| (South Korea) Suwon | **2** | 0 | Suwon Samsung Bluewings (2) | — |
| (South Korea) Ulsan | **2** | 0 | Ulsan HD (2) | — |
| (China) Guangzhou | **2** | 0 | Guangzhou (2) | — |
| (Japan) Iwata | **1** | 2 | Júbilo Iwata (1) | Júbilo Iwata (2) |
| (South Korea) Seoul | **1** | 2 | Ilhwa Chunma (1) | Yangzee (1); FC Seoul (1) |
| (Japan) Yokohama | **1** | 2 | Furukawa Electric (1) | Yokohama F. Marinos (2) |
| (China) Shenyang | **1** | 1 | Liaoning (1) | Liaoning (1) |
| (South Korea) Seongnam | **1** | 1 | Seongnam Ilhwa Chunma (1) | Seongnam Ilhwa Chunma (1) |
| (Japan) Tokyo | **1** | 1 | Yomiuri (1) | Machida Zelvia (1) |
| (Australia) Sydney | **1** | 0 | Western Sydney Wanderers (1) | — |
| (South Korea) Busan | **1** | 0 | Daewoo Royals (1) | — |
| (Japan) Osaka | **1** | 0 | Gamba Osaka (1) | — |
| (Japan) Kashima | **1** | 0 | Kashima Antlers (1) | — |
| (Iran) Isfahan | 0 | 2 | — | Sepahan (1); Zob Ahan (1) |
| (Iraq) Baghdad | 0 | 2 | — | Aliyat Al-Shorta (1); Al-Rasheed (1) |
| (Malaysia) Shah Alam | 0 | 1 | — | Selangor (1) |
| (Oman) Muscat | 0 | 1 | — | Oman Club (1) |
| (China) Dalian | 0 | 1 | — | Dalian Wanda (1) |
| (South Korea) Anyang | 0 | 1 | — | Anyang LG Cheetahs (1) |
| (Syria) Homs | 0 | 1 | — | Al-Karamah (1) |
| (Australia) Adelaide | 0 | 1 | — | Adelaide United (1) |
| (United Arab Emirates) Dubai | 0 | 1 | — | Al-Ahli (1) |
| (Japan) Kawasaki | 0 | 1 | — | Kawasaki Frontale (1) |

=== AFC Champions League era ===
==== Titles by club ====
Performances in the AFC Champions League by club
| Club | Titles | Runners-up | Seasons won | Seasons runner-up |
|---|---|---|---|---|
| (Japan) Urawa Red Diamonds | 3 | 1 | 2007, 2017, 2022 | 2019 |
| (Saudi Arabia) Al-Hilal | 2 | 3 | 2019, 2021 | 2014, 2017, 2022 |
| (United Arab Emirates) Al-Ain | 2 | 2 | 2003, 2024 | 2005, 2016 |
| (Saudi Arabia) Al-Ittihad | 2 | 1 | 2004, 2005 | 2009 |
| (South Korea) Jeonbuk Hyundai Motors | 2 | 1 | 2006, 2016 | 2011 |
| (Saudi Arabia) Al-Ahli | 2 | 1 | 2025, 2026 | 2012 |
| (South Korea) Ulsan HD | 2 | 0 | 2012, 2020 | — |
| (China) Guangzhou | 2 | 0 | 2013, 2015 | — |
| (South Korea) Pohang Steelers | 1 | 1 | 2009 | 2021 |
| (South Korea) Seongnam FC | 1 | 1 | 2010 | 2004 |
| (Japan) Gamba Osaka | 1 | 0 | 2008 | — |
| (Qatar) Al-Sadd | 1 | 0 | 2011 | — |
| (Australia) Western Sydney Wanderers | 1 | 0 | 2014 | — |
| (Japan) Kashima Antlers | 1 | 0 | 2018 | — |
| (Iran) Persepolis | 0 | 2 | — | 2018, 2020 |
| (Thailand) Police Tero | 0 | 1 | — | 2003 |
| (Syria) Al-Karamah | 0 | 1 | — | 2006 |
| (Iran) Sepahan | 0 | 1 | — | 2007 |
| (Australia) Adelaide United | 0 | 1 | — | 2008 |
| (Iran) Zob Ahan | 0 | 1 | — | 2010 |
| (South Korea) FC Seoul | 0 | 1 | — | 2013 |
| (United Arab Emirates) Shabab Al-Ahli | 0 | 1 | — | 2015 |
| (Japan) Yokohama F. Marinos | 0 | 1 | — | 2024 |
| (Japan) Kawasaki Frontale | 0 | 1 | — | 2025 |
| (Japan) Machida Zelvia | 0 | 1 | — | 2026 |

==== Titles by nation ====
| Country | Winners | Runners-up | Winning clubs | Runners-up |
|---|---|---|---|---|
| Saudi Arabia | **6** | 5 | Al-Ittihad (2); Al-Hilal (2); Al-Ahli (2) | Al-Hilal (3); Al-Ittihad (1); Al-Ahli (1) |
| South Korea | **6** | 4 | Jeonbuk Hyundai Motors (2); Ulsan HD (2); Pohang Steelers (1); Seongnam FC (1) | Seongnam FC (1); FC Seoul (1); Jeonbuk Hyundai Motors (1); Pohang Steelers (1) |
| Japan | **5** | 4 | Urawa Red Diamonds (3); Gamba Osaka (1); Kashima Antlers (1) | Urawa Red Diamonds (1); Yokohama F. Marinos (1); Kawasaki Frontale (1); Machida Zelvia (1) |
| United Arab Emirates | **2** | 3 | Al-Ain (2) | Al-Ain (2); Shabab Al-Ahli (1) |
| China | **2** | 0 | Guangzhou (2) | — |
| Australia | **1** | 1 | Western Sydney Wanderers (1) | Adelaide United (1) |
| Qatar | **1** | 0 | Al-Sadd (1) | — |
| Iran | 0 | 4 | — | Persepolis (2); Sepahan (1); Zob Ahan (1) |
| Thailand | 0 | 1 | — | Police Tero (1) |
| Syria | 0 | 1 | — | Al-Karamah (1) |

==== Titles by city ====
| City | Winners | Runners-up | Winning clubs | Runners-up |
|---|---|---|---|---|
| (Saudi Arabia) Jeddah | **4** | 2 | Al-Ittihad (2); Al-Ahli (2) | Al-Ittihad (1); Al-Ahli (1) |
| (Japan) Saitama | **3** | 1 | Urawa Red Diamonds (3) | Urawa Red Diamonds (1) |
| (Saudi Arabia) Riyadh | **2** | 3 | Al-Hilal (2) | Al-Hilal (3) |
| (United Arab Emirates) Al Ain | **2** | 2 | Al-Ain (2) | Al-Ain (2) |
| (South Korea) Jeonju | **2** | 1 | Jeonbuk Hyundai Motors (2) | Jeonbuk Hyundai Motors (1) |
| (South Korea) Ulsan | **2** | 0 | Ulsan HD (2) | — |
| (China) Guangzhou | **2** | 0 | Guangzhou (2) | — |
| (South Korea) Seongnam | **1** | 1 | Seongnam FC (1) | Seongnam FC (1) |
| (South Korea) Pohang | **1** | 1 | Pohang Steelers (1) | Pohang Steelers (1) |
| (Japan) Osaka | **1** | 0 | Gamba Osaka (1) | — |
| (Qatar) Doha | **1** | 0 | Al-Sadd (1) | — |
| (Australia) Sydney | **1** | 0 | Western Sydney Wanderers (1) | — |
| (Japan) Kashima | **1** | 0 | Kashima Antlers (1) | — |
| (Iran) Isfahan | 0 | 2 | — | Sepahan (1); Zob Ahan (1) |
| (Iran) Tehran | 0 | 2 | — | Persepolis (2) |
| (Thailand) Bangkok | 0 | 1 | — | Police Tero (1) |
| (Syria) Homs | 0 | 1 | — | Al-Karamah (1) |
| (Australia) Adelaide | 0 | 1 | — | Adelaide United (1) |
| (South Korea) Seoul | 0 | 1 | — | FC Seoul (1) |
| (United Arab Emirates) Dubai | 0 | 1 | — | Shabab Al-Ahli (1) |
| (Japan) Yokohama | 0 | 1 | — | Yokohama F. Marinos (1) |
| (Japan) Kawasaki | 0 | 1 | — | Kawasaki Frontale (1) |
| (Japan) Tokyo | 0 | 1 | — | Machida Zelvia (1) |

=== All-time AFC Champions League points table ===
This table includes results beyond group stage of the AFC Champions League since 2002–03 season and does not include the old Asian Club Championship. Following statistical convention in football, matches decided in extra time are counted as wins and losses, while matches decided by penalty shoot-outs are counted as draws. Teams are ranked by total points, then by goal difference, then by goals scored. Only the top twenty five are listed (excludes qualifying rounds).

As of end of 2025–26 season)

| Best Finish | Winner | Runners-up | Semi-finals | Quarter-finals | Round of 16 |

| Rank | Club | Years | Pld | W | D | L | GF | GA | GD | Pts | W | RU | SF | QF | 16 | GS |
|---|---|---|---|---|---|---|---|---|---|---|---|---|---|---|---|---|
| 1 | (Saudi Arabia) Al-Hilal | 20 | 183 | 100 | 44 | 39 | 335 | 181 | +154 | 344 | 2 | 3 | 4 | 2 | 5 | 4 |
| 2 | (South Korea) Jeonbuk Hyundai Motors | 16 | 142 | 74 | 29 | 39 | 280 | 171 | +109 | 251 | 2 | 1 | 2 | 6 | 3 | 2 |
| 3 | (Saudi Arabia) Al-Ahli | 14 | 119 | 62 | 28 | 29 | 213 | 137 | +76 | 214 | 2 | 1 | | 4 | 3 | 4 |
| 4 | (Saudi Arabia) Al-Ittihad | 13 | 112 | 61 | 22 | 29 | 212 | 118 | +94 | 205 | 2 | 1 | 2 | 5 | | 3 |
| 5 | (United Arab Emirates) Al-Ain | 17 | 139 | 54 | 39 | 46 | 218 | 197 | +21 | 201 | 2 | 2 | 1 | 3 | 2 | 7 |
| 6 | (Qatar) Al-Sadd | 18 | 139 | 51 | 41 | 47 | 209 | 192 | +17 | 194 | 1 | | 2 | 4 | 2 | 9 |
| 7 | (South Korea) Ulsan HD | 13 | 104 | 57 | 18 | 29 | 171 | 123 | +48 | 189 | 2 | | 3 | | 2 | 6 |
| 8 | (Uzbekistan) Pakhtakor | 19 | 121 | 48 | 28 | 45 | 153 | 160 | −7 | 172 | | | 2 | 2 | 2 | 13 |
| 9 | (Qatar) Al-Duhail | 13 | 101 | 46 | 24 | 31 | 165 | 148 | +17 | 162 | | | 1 | 3 | 4 | 5 |
| 10 | (Japan) Kawasaki Frontale | 11 | 86 | 47 | 17 | 22 | 173 | 89 | +84 | 158 | | 1 | | 3 | 3 | 4 |
| 11 | (China) Guangzhou | 11 | 99 | 40 | 26 | 33 | 153 | 133 | +20 | 146 | 2 | | 1 | 3 | 1 | 4 |
| 12 | (Iran) Sepahan | 14 | 98 | 42 | 19 | 37 | 146 | 129 | +17 | 145 | | 1 | | 2 | 1 | 10 |
| 13 | (Iran) Persepolis | 12 | 93 | 40 | 23 | 30 | 117 | 103 | +14 | 143 | | 2 | 1 | 1 | 3 | 5 |
| 14 | (Iran) Esteghlal | 13 | 93 | 34 | 30 | 29 | 130 | 116 | +14 | 132 | | | 1 | 1 | 6 | 5 |
| 15 | (Saudi Arabia) Al-Shabab | 10 | 75 | 39 | 13 | 23 | 111 | 79 | +32 | 130 | | | 1 | 3 | 3 | 3 |
| 16 | (Japan) Urawa Red Diamonds | 9 | 81 | 36 | 22 | 23 | 145 | 86 | +59 | 130 | 3 | 1 | 1 | | 1 | 3 |
| 17 | (South Korea) Suwon Samsung Bluewings | 10 | 77 | 35 | 23 | 19 | 126 | 81 | +45 | 128 | | | 2 | 2 | 2 | 4 |
| 18 | (South Korea) Pohang Steelers | 10 | 80 | 35 | 23 | 22 | 106 | 81 | +25 | 128 | 1 | 1 | | 2 | 1 | 5 |
| 19 | (South Korea) FC Seoul | 9 | 86 | 33 | 26 | 27 | 135 | 109 | +26 | 125 | | 1 | 2 | 2 | 2 | 2 |
| 20 | (Japan) Kashima Antlers | 9 | 70 | 36 | 15 | 19 | 138 | 76 | +62 | 123 | 1 | | | 2 | 4 | 2 |
| 21 | (Saudi Arabia) Al-Nassr | 8 | 69 | 34 | 18 | 17 | 100 | 72 | +28 | 120 | | | 3 | 2 | 1 | 2 |
| 22 | (Japan) Gamba Osaka | 10 | 75 | 33 | 17 | 25 | 147 | 97 | +50 | 116 | 1 | | 1 | | 3 | 5 |
| 23 | (Japan) Yokohama F. Marinos | 7 | 56 | 36 | 4 | 16 | 113 | 62 | +51 | 112 | | 1 | | 1 | 2 | 3 |
| 24 | (China) Shandong Taishan | 11 | 78 | 31 | 15 | 32 | 125 | 134 | −9 | 108 | | | | 3 | 1 | 7 |
| 25 | (South Korea) Seongnam FC | 6 | 52 | 32 | 9 | 11 | 117 | 55 | +62 | 105 | 1 | 1 | 1 | | 2 | 1 |

=== Number of participating clubs of the Champions League era (from 2002–present) ===
The following table is a list of clubs that have participated in the AFC Champions League (group/league stage). Season in bold represents teams that qualified for the knockout stage.

| Nation | No. | Clubs | Seasons |
|---|---|---|---|
| Japan (18) | 11 | Kawasaki Frontale | **2007**, **2009**, 2010, **2014**, **2017**, 2018, 2019, **2021**, 2022, **2023–24**, **2024–25** |
| Japan (18) | 11 | Gamba Osaka | 2006, **2008**, **2009**, **2010**, **2011**, 2012, **2015**, 2016, 2017, 2021, 2026–27 |
| Japan (18) | 10 | Kashima Antlers | 2002–03, **2008**, **2009**, **2010**, **2011**, 2015, **2017**, **2018**, **2019**, 2026–27 |
| Japan (18) | 9 | Urawa Red Diamonds | **2007**, **2008**, 2013, 2015, **2016**, **2017**, **2019**, **2022**, 2023–24 |
| Japan (18) | 7 | Yokohama F. Marinos | 2004, 2005, 2014, **2020**, **2022**, **2023–24**, **2024–25** |
| Japan (18) | 6 | Sanfrecce Hiroshima | 2010, 2013, **2014**, 2016, **2019**, **2025–26** |
| Japan (18) | 5 | Kashiwa Reysol | **2012**, **2013**, **2015**, 2018, 2026–27 |
| Japan (18) | 5 | Vissel Kobe | **2020**, **2022**, **2024–25**, **2025–26**, 2026–27 |
| Japan (18) | 4 | Nagoya Grampus | **2009**, **2011**, **2012**, **2021** |
| Japan (18) | 4 | Cerezo Osaka | **2011**, **2014**, 2018, **2021** |
| Japan (18) | 3 | FC Tokyo | **2012**, **2016**, **2020** |
| Japan (18) | 2 | Júbilo Iwata | 2004, 2005 |
| Japan (18) | 1 | Shimizu S-Pulse | 2002–03 |
| Japan (18) | 1 | Tokyo Verdy | 2006 |
| Japan (18) | 1 | Vegalta Sendai | 2013 |
| Japan (18) | 1 | Ventforet Kofu | **2023–24** |
| Japan (18) | 1 | Machida Zelvia | **2025–26** |
| Japan (18) | 1 | Kyoto Sanga | 2026–27 |
| China (17) | 11 | Guangzhou | **2012**, **2013**, **2014**, **2015**, 2016, **2017**, **2018**, **2019**, 2020, 2021, 2022 |
| China (17) | 11 | Shandong Taishan | **2005**, 2007, 2009, 2010, 2011, 2014, 2015, **2016**, 2019, 2022, **2023–24** |
| China (17) | 11 | Beijing Guoan | 2008, 2009, **2010**, 2012, **2013**, 2014, **2015**, **2019**, **2020**, 2021, 2026–27 |
| China (17) | 10 | Shanghai Shenhua | 2002–03, 2004, **2006**, 2007, 2009, 2011, 2018, 2020, **2024–25**, 2025–26 |
| China (17) | 8 | Shanghai Port | **2016**, **2017**, **2018**, **2019**, **2020**, **2024–25**, 2025–26, 2026–27 |
| China (17) | 3 | Dalian Shide | **2002–03**, **2004**, 2006 |
| China (17) | 3 | Tianjin Teda | 2009, **2011**, 2012 |
| China (17) | 3 | Jiangsu Suning | 2013, 2016, **2017** |
| China (17) | 2 | Changchun Yatai | 2008, 2010 |
| China (17) | 2 | Beijing Renhe | 2013, 2014 |
| China (17) | 2 | Zhejiang | 2011, 2023–24 |
| China (17) | 1 | Shenzhen Jianlibao | **2005** |
| China (17) | 1 | Henan Jianye | 2010 |
| China (17) | 1 | Guangzhou R&F | 2015 |
| China (17) | 1 | Tianjin Quanjian | **2018** |
| China (17) | 1 | Wuhan Three Towns | 2023–24 |
| China (17) | 1 | Chengdu Rongcheng | 2025–26 |
| South Korea (15) | 17 | Jeonbuk Hyundai Motors | **2004**, **2006**, **2007**, **2010**, **2011**, 2012, **2013**, **2014**, **2015**, **2016**, **2018**, **2019**, 2020, **2021**, **2022**, **2023–24**, 2026–27 |
| South Korea (15) | 13 | Ulsan HD | **2006**, 2009, **2012**, 2014, 2017, **2018**, **2019**, **2020**, **2021**, 2022, **2023–24**, 2024–25, 2025–26 |
| South Korea (15) | 11 | Pohang Steelers | 2008, **2009**, **2010**, 2012, 2013, **2014**, 2016, **2021**, **2023–24**, 2024–25, 2026–27 |
| South Korea (15) | 10 | Suwon Samsung Bluewings | 2005, **2009**, **2010**, **2011**, 2013, **2015**, 2016, 2017, **2018**, **2020** |
| South Korea (15) | 9 | FC Seoul | **2009**, **2011**, **2013**, **2014**, **2015**, **2016**, 2017, 2020, **2025–26** |
| South Korea (15) | 6 | Seongnam FC | 2002–03, **2004**, **2007**, **2010**, **2012**, **2015** |
| South Korea (15) | 3 | Jeju United | 2011, **2017**, 2018 |
| South Korea (15) | 3 | Jeonnam Dragons | 2007, 2008, 2022 |
| South Korea (15) | 3 | Daegu FC | 2019, **2021**, **2022** |
| South Korea (15) | 2 | Daejeon Hana Citizen | 2002–03, 2026–27 |
| South Korea (15) | 1 | Busan IPark | **2005** |
| South Korea (15) | 1 | Gyeongnam FC | 2019 |
| South Korea (15) | 1 | Incheon United | 2023–24 |
| South Korea (15) | 1 | Gwangju FC | **2024–25** |
| South Korea (15) | 1 | Gangwon FC | **2025–26** |
| Iran (14) | 14 | Sepahan | 2004, 2005, **2007**, 2008, 2009, 2010, **2011**, **2012**, 2013, 2014, 2016, 2020, 2022, **2023–24** |
| Iran (14) | 14 | Esteghlal | 2002–03, 2009, **2010**, 2011, **2012**, **2013**, 2014, **2017**, **2018**, 2019, **2020**, **2021**, **2024–25**, 2026–27 |
| Iran (14) | 12 | Persepolis | 2002–03, **2009**, 2011, **2012**, **2015**, **2017**, **2018**, 2019, **2020**, **2021**, 2023–24, 2024–25 |
| Iran (14) | 8 | Tractor | 2013, 2014, 2015, **2016**, 2018, **2021**, **2025–26**, 2026–27 |
| Iran (14) | 7 | Zob Ahan | 2004, **2010**, **2011**, **2016**, 2017, **2018**, **2019** |
| Iran (14) | 5 | Foolad | 2006, **2014**, 2015, 2021, **2022** |
| Iran (14) | 2 | Saba Qom | 2006, 2009 |
| Iran (14) | 1 | PAS Tehran | **2005** |
| Iran (14) | 1 | Saipa | **2008** |
| Iran (14) | 1 | Mes Kerman | **2010** |
| Iran (14) | 1 | Naft Tehran | **2015** |
| Iran (14) | 1 | Esteghlal Khuzestan | **2017** |
| Iran (14) | 1 | Shahr Khodro | 2020 |
| Iran (14) | 1 | Nassaji | 2023–24 |
| Saudi Arabia (11) | 21 | Al-Hilal | 2002–03, 2004, 2006, **2007**, **2009**, **2010**, **2011**, **2012**, **2013**, **2014**, **2015**, **2016**, **2017**, 2018, **2019**, **2021**, **2022**, **2023–24**, **2024–25**, **2025–26**, 2026–27 |
| Saudi Arabia (11) | 15 | Al-Ahli | **2005**, 2008, 2010, **2012**, **2013**, **2015**, 2016, **2017**, **2018**, **2019**, **2020**, 2021, **2024–25**, **2025–26**, 2026–27 |
| Saudi Arabia (11) | 14 | Al-Ittihad | **2004**, **2005**, **2006**, 2008, **2009**, 2010, **2011**, **2012**, **2014**, 2016, **2019**, **2023–24**, **2025–26**, 2026–27 |
| Saudi Arabia (11) | 10 | Al-Shabab | 2005, **2006**, 2007, **2009**, **2010**, **2011**, **2013**, **2014**, 2015, **2022** |
| Saudi Arabia (11) | 9 | Al-Nassr | **2011**, 2015, 2016, **2019**, **2020**, **2021**, **2023–24**, **2024–25**, 2026–27 |
| Saudi Arabia (11) | 3 | Al-Taawoun | 2017, **2020**, 2022 |
| Saudi Arabia (11) | 2 | Al-Ettifaq | **2009**, 2013 |
| Saudi Arabia (11) | 2 | Al-Fateh | 2014, 2017 |
| Saudi Arabia (11) | 1 | Al-Faisaly | **2022** |
| Saudi Arabia (11) | 1 | Al-Fayha | **2023–24** |
| Saudi Arabia (11) | 1 | Al-Qadsiah | 2026–27 |
| Thailand (11) | 11 | Buriram United | 2012, **2013**, 2014, 2015, 2016, **2018**, 2019, 2023–24, **2024–25**, **2025–26**, 2026–27 |
| Thailand (11) | 3 | BEC Tero Sasana | **2002–03**, 2004, 2005 |
| Thailand (11) | 3 | Krung Thai Bank | 2004, 2005, 2008 |
| Thailand (11) | 3 | Chiangrai United | 2020, 2021, 2022 |
| Thailand (11) | 3 | BG Pathum United | **2021**, **2022**, 2023–24 |
| Thailand (11) | 2 | Muangthong United | 2013, **2017** |
| Thailand (11) | 2 | Bangkok United | 2007, **2023–24** |
| Thailand (11) | 2 | Port | 2021, 2026–27 |
| Thailand (11) | 2 | Ratchaburi | 2021, 2026–27 |
| Thailand (11) | 1 | Osotsapa | 2002–03 |
| Thailand (11) | 1 | Chonburi | 2008 |
| United Arab Emirates (10) | 18 | Al-Ain | **2002–03**, **2004**, **2005**, **2006**, 2007, 2010, 2011, 2013, **2014**, **2015**, **2016**, **2017**, **2018**, 2019, 2020, **2023–24**, 2024–25, 2026–27 |
| United Arab Emirates (10) | 11 | Al-Wahda | **2004**, 2006, **2007**, 2008, 2010, 2011, 2017, 2018, **2019**, **2021**, **2025–26** |
| United Arab Emirates (10) | 11 | Shabab Al-Ahli | 2005, 2009, 2010, 2014, **2015**, **2017**, **2020**, 2021, **2022**, **2025–26**, 2026–27 |
| United Arab Emirates (10) | 10 | Al-Jazira | 2009, 2010, 2011, **2012**, 2013, **2014**, 2016, 2017, **2018**, 2022 |
| United Arab Emirates (10) | 6 | Sharjah | **2004**, 2020, **2021**, 2022, 2023–24, 2025–26 |
| United Arab Emirates (10) | 5 | Al-Wasl | 2008, 2018, 2019, **2024–25**, 2026–27 |
| United Arab Emirates (10) | 3 | Al-Shabab | 2009, 2012, **2013** |
| United Arab Emirates (10) | 3 | Al-Nasr | 2012, 2013, **2016** |
| United Arab Emirates (10) | 1 | Emirates | 2011 |
| United Arab Emirates (10) | 1 | Baniyas | **2012** |
| Qatar (9) | 19 | Al-Sadd | 2002–03, 2004, **2005**, 2006, 2007, 2008, 2010, **2011**, **2014**, **2015**, **2018**, **2019**, **2020**, 2021, 2022, 2023–24, **2024–25**, **2025–26**, 2026–27 |
| Qatar (9) | 13 | Al-Duhail | 2012, **2013**, 2014, **2015**, **2016**, **2017**, **2018**, **2019**, 2020, 2021, **2022**, 2023–24, **2025–26** |
| Qatar (9) | 12 | Al-Rayyan | 2005, 2007, 2011, 2012, 2013, 2014, 2017, 2018, 2019, 2021, **2022**, **2024–25** |
| Qatar (9) | 12 | Al-Gharafa | 2006, 2008, 2009, **2010**, 2011, 2012, **2013**, 2018, 2022, 2024–25, 2025–26, 2026–27 |
| Qatar (9) | 3 | El-Jaish | **2013**, 2014, **2016** |
| Qatar (9) | 1 | Qatar SC | 2004 |
| Qatar (9) | 1 | Umm-Salal | **2009** |
| Qatar (9) | 1 | Al-Arabi | 2012 |
| Qatar (9) | 1 | Al-Shamal | 2026–27 |
| Australia (9) | 8 | Melbourne Victory | 2008, 2010, 2011, 2014, **2016**, 2018, 2019, **2020** |
| Australia (9) | 7 | Sydney FC | 2007, 2011, **2016**, 2018, 2019, 2020, 2022 |
| Australia (9) | 5 | Adelaide United | 2007, **2008**, **2010**, **2012**, 2017 |
| Australia (9) | 5 | Central Coast Mariners | 2009, 2012, **2013**, 2014, 2024–25 |
| Australia (9) | 3 | Brisbane Roar | 2012, 2015, 2017 |
| Australia (9) | 3 | Western Sydney Wanderers | **2014**, 2015, 2017 |
| Australia (9) | 3 | Melbourne City | 2022, 2023–24, **2025–26** |
| Australia (9) | 2 | Newcastle Jets | **2009**, 2026–27 |
| Australia (9) | 1 | Perth Glory | 2020 |
| Vietnam (9) | 3 | Becamex Binh Duong | 2008, 2015, 2016 |
| Vietnam (9) | 3 | Hoang Anh Gia Lai | 2004, 2005, 2022 |
| Vietnam (9) | 2 | Binh Dinh | 2004, 2005 |
| Vietnam (9) | 2 | Long An | 2006, 2007 |
| Vietnam (9) | 1 | Da Nang | 2006 |
| Vietnam (9) | 1 | Nam Dinh | 2008 |
| Vietnam (9) | 1 | Viettel | 2021 |
| Vietnam (9) | 1 | Hanoi | 2023–24 |
| Vietnam (9) | 1 | Công An Hà Nội | 2026–27 |
| Uzbekistan (8) | 20 | Pakhtakor | **2002–03**, **2004**, 2005, 2006, 2007, 2008, **2009**, **2010**, 2011, 2012, 2013, 2015, 2016, 2019, **2020**, 2021, 2022, **2023–24**, **2024–25**, 2026–27 |
| Uzbekistan (8) | 10 | Bunyodkor | **2008**, **2009**, **2010**, **2011**, **2012**, **2013**, **2014**, 2015, 2016, 2017 |
| Uzbekistan (8) | 7 | Nasaf | 2012, 2015, 2016, 2018, **2022**, **2023–24**, 2025–26 |
| Uzbekistan (8) | 5 | Lokomotiv Tashkent | 2015, **2016**, 2017, 2018, 2019 |
| Uzbekistan (8) | 4 | Neftchi Farg'ona | 2004, 2005, 2007, 2026–27 |
| Uzbekistan (8) | 2 | AGMK | 2021, 2023–24 |
| Uzbekistan (8) | 1 | Mash'al Mubarek | 2006 |
| Uzbekistan (8) | 1 | Navbahor | 2023–24 |
| Iraq (7) | 7 | Al-Quwa Al-Jawiya | 2004, 2006, 2008, 2021, 2022, 2023–24, 2026–27 |
| Iraq (7) | 6 | Al-Shorta | 2004, 2005, 2020, 2021, 2024–25, 2025–26 |
| Iraq (7) | 3 | Al-Zawra'a | 2005, 2007, 2019 |
| Iraq (7) | 1 | Al-Talaba | 2002–03 |
| Iraq (7) | 1 | Al-Mina'a | 2006 |
| Iraq (7) | 1 | Al-Najaf | 2007 |
| Iraq (7) | 1 | Erbil | 2008 |
| Indonesia (6) | 2 | PSM Makassar | 2004, 2005 |
| Indonesia (6) | 2 | Persik Kediri | 2004, 2007 |
| Indonesia (6) | 2 | Arema | 2007, 2011 |
| Indonesia (6) | 1 | Persebaya Surabaya | 2005 |
| Indonesia (6) | 1 | Sriwijaya | 2009 |
| Indonesia (6) | 1 | Persipura Jayapura | 2010 |
| Kuwait (4) | 3 | Al-Arabi | 2004, 2006, 2007 |
| Kuwait (4) | 3 | Al-Kuwait | 2005, 2007, 2008 |
| Kuwait (4) | 2 | Al-Qadsia | **2006**, **2008** |
| Kuwait (4) | 1 | Al-Salmiya | 2005 |
| Syria (4) | 3 | Al-Ittihad | 2006, 2007, 2008 |
| Syria (4) | 3 | Al-Karamah | **2006**, **2007**, **2008** |
| Syria (4) | 1 | Al-Jaish | 2005 |
| Syria (4) | 1 | Al-Wahda | 2005 |
| Singapore (3) | 2 | Singapore Armed Forces | 2009, 2010 |
| Singapore (3) | 2 | Lion City Sailors | 2022, 2023–24 |
| Singapore (3) | 1 | Tampines Rovers | 2021 |
| Hong Kong (2) | 4 | Kitchee | 2018, 2021, **2022**, 2023–24 |
| Hong Kong (2) | 1 | Eastern | 2017 |
| Philippines (2) | 2 | United City | 2021, 2022 |
| Philippines (2) | 2 | Kaya–Iloilo | 2021, 2023–24 |
| Turkmenistan (2) | 2 | Ahal | 2022, 2023–24 |
| Turkmenistan (2) | 1 | Nisa Aşgabat | 2002–03 |
| India (2) | 2 | Mumbai City | 2022, 2023–24 |
| India (2) | 1 | Goa | 2021 |
| Jordan (2) | 2 | Al-Wehdat | 2021, 2022 |
| Jordan (2) | 1 | Al-Faisaly | 2023–24 |
| Malaysia (1) | 7 | Johor Darul Ta'zim | 2019, 2021, **2022**, 2023–24, **2024–25**, **2025–26**, 2026–27 |
| Tajikistan (1) | 3 | Istiklol | **2021**, 2022, 2023–24 |

Team in Italic: team no longer active.

=== Attendance record ===
The following table lists 24 matches with more than 70,000 attendances at Asian Club Championship and AFC Champions League. All 24 matches took place in Iran. 23 of the 24 matches took place at the Azadi Stadium in Tehran.

Esteghlal has the record of 12 matches and also the record of 121,000 spectators against Jubilo Iwata in the 1998–99 Asian Club Championship final.

| # | Date | Home team | Score | Away team | Venue | Attendance |
|---|---|---|---|---|---|---|
| 1 | 30 April 1999 | Esteghlal (Iran) | 1–2 | (Japan) Jubilo Iwata | (Iran) Azadi Stadium | 121,000 |
| 2 | 28 April 1999 | Esteghlal (Iran) | 4–3 (a.e.t.) | (China) Dalian Wanda | (Iran) Azadi Stadium | 100,000 |
| 3 | 10 November 2018 | Persepolis (Iran) | 0–0 | (Japan) Kashima Antlers | (Iran) Azadi Stadium | 100,000 |
| 4 | 19 May 2015 | Persepolis (Iran) | 1–0 | (Saudi Arabia) Al-Hilal | (Iran) Azadi Stadium | 100,000 |
| 5 | 6 May 2015 | Persepolis (Iran) | 2–1 | (Uzbekistan) Bunyodkor | (Iran) Azadi Stadium | 100,000 |
| 6 | 8 April 2015 | Persepolis (Iran) | 1–0 | (Saudi Arabia) Al-Nassr | (Iran) Azadi Stadium | 100,000 |
| 7 | 17 April 2012 | Persepolis (Iran) | 1–1 | (Qatar) Al-Gharafa | (Iran) Azadi Stadium | 96,200 |
| 8 | 21 August 2013 | Esteghlal (Iran) | 1–0 | (Thailand) Buriram United | (Iran) Azadi Stadium | 95,300 |
| 9 | 27 May 2009 | Persepolis (Iran) | 0–1 | (Uzbekistan) Bunyodkor | (Iran) Azadi Stadium | 95,225 |
| 10 | 12 March 2018 | Esteghlal (Iran) | 1–1 | (United Arab Emirates) Al-Ain | (Iran) Azadi Stadium | 90,000 |
| 11 | 2 October 2013 | Esteghlal (Iran) | 2–2 | (South Korea) FC Seoul | (Iran) Azadi Stadium | 88,330 |
| 12 | 11 May 2011 | Esteghlal (Iran) | 2–1 | (Saudi Arabia) Al-Nassr | (Iran) Azadi Stadium | 85,422 |
| 13 | 21 March 2012 | Persepolis (Iran) | 6–1 | (United Arab Emirates) Al-Shabab Al-Arabi | (Iran) Azadi Stadium | 82,700 |
| 14 | 23 October 2018 | Persepolis (Iran) | 1–1 | (Qatar) Al-Sadd | (Iran) Azadi Stadium | 81,350 |
| 15 | 22 August 2023 | Tractor (Iran) | 1–3 | (United Arab Emirates) Sharjah | (Iran) Yadegar-e Emam Stadium | 80,898 |
| 16 | 9 April 2013 | Esteghlal (Iran) | 0–1 | (Saudi Arabia) Al-Hilal | (Iran) Azadi Stadium | 80,300 |
| 17 | 14 May 2018 | Persepolis (Iran) | 2–1 | (United Arab Emirates) Al-Jazira | (Iran) Azadi Stadium | 80,000 |
| 18 | 27 August 2018 | Esteghlal (Iran) | 1–3 | (Qatar) Al-Sadd | (Iran) Azadi Stadium | 78,116 |
| 19 | 25 April 2017 | Esteghlal (Iran) | 1–1 | (United Arab Emirates) Al-Ahli | (Iran) Azadi Stadium | 76,428 |
| 20 | 15 May 2018 | Esteghlal (Iran) | 3–1 | (Iran) Zob Ahan | (Iran) Azadi Stadium | 75,680 |
| 21 | 3 March 2025 | Esteghlal (Iran) | 0–0 | (Saudi Arabia) Al-Nassr | (Iran) Azadi Stadium | 75,130 |
| 22 | 7 February 2017 | Esteghlal (Iran) | 0–0 (a.e.t.) (4–3 p) | (Qatar) Al-Sadd | (Iran) Azadi Stadium | 74,560 |
| 23 | 1 May 2012 | Persepolis (Iran) | 0–1 | (Saudi Arabia) Al-Hilal | (Iran) Azadi Stadium | 73,154 |
| 24 | 17 September 2018 | Persepolis (Iran) | 3–1 | (Qatar) Al-Duhail | (Iran) Azadi Stadium | 71,312 |

== Clubs ==
=== By semi-final appearances ===
==== Asian Club Championship and AFC Champions League ====
The following table does not include semifinalists from 1987 to 1989–90 seasons. In these seasons, there were no semi-finals as the finalists qualified via a group stage.

| Team | No. | Years |
|---|---|---|
| (Saudi Arabia) Al-Hilal | 14 | **1986**, **1987**, **1991**, 1997–98, **1999–2000**, 2010, **2014**, 2015, **2017**, **2019, 2021, 2022**, 2023–24, 2024–25 |
| (Iran) Esteghlal | 7 | **1970**, 1971, **1990–91**, **1991**, **1998–99**, 2001–02, 2013 |
| (Iran) Persepolis | 7 | 1996–97, 1997–98, 1999–2000, 2000–01, 2017, **2018**, **2020** |
| (South Korea) Seongnam FC | 6 | 1994–95, **1995**, **1996–97**, **2004**, 2007, **2010** |
| (United Arab Emirates) Al-Ain | 6 | 1998–99, **2002–03**, **2005**, 2014, **2016**, **2023–24** |
| (Saudi Arabia) Al-Ittihad | 5 | **2004**, **2005**, **2009**, 2011, 2012 |
| (South Korea) Suwon Samsung Bluewings | 5 | 1999–2000, **2000–01**, **2001–02**, 2011, 2018 |
| (South Korea) Jeonbuk Hyundai Motors | 5 | 2004, **2006**, **2011**, **2016**, 2022 |
| (Japan) Urawa Red Diamonds | 5 | **2007**, 2008, **2017**, **2019**, **2022** |
| (South Korea) Ulsan HD | 5 | 2006, **2012**, **2020**, 2021, 2023–24 |
| (China) Liaoning | 4 | 1986, **1989–90**, **1990–91**, 1993–94 |
| (South Korea) FC Seoul | 4 | **2001–02**, **2013**, 2014, 2016 |
| (Qatar) Al-Sadd | 4 | **1988–89**, **2011**, 2018, 2019 |
| (South Korea) Pohang Steelers | 4 | **1996–97**, **1997–98**, **2009, 2021** |
| (Saudi Arabia) Al-Nassr | 4 | **1995**, 2020, 2021, 2024–25 |
| (Saudi Arabia) Al-Ahli | 4 | **1985**, **2012**, **2024–25**, **2025–26** |
| (Japan) Tokyo Verdy | 3 | **1987**, 1992–93, 1993–94 |
| (Thailand) Thai Farmers Bank | 3 | **1993–94**, **1994–95**, 1995 |
| (Japan) Júbilo Iwata | 3 | **1998–99**, **1999–2000**, **2000–01** |
| (China) Dalian Shide | 3 | **1997–98**, 1998–99, 2002–03 |
| (China) Guangzhou | 3 | **2013**, **2015**, 2019 |
| (Israel) Hapoel Tel Aviv | 2 | **1967**, **1970** |
| (Israel) Maccabi Tel Aviv | 2 | **1969**, **1971** |
| (Uzbekistan) Pakhtakor | 2 | 2002–03, 2004 |
| (South Korea) Busan IPark | 2 | **1985**, 2005 |
| (Saudi Arabia) Al-Shabab | 2 | **1992–93**, 2010 |
| (Uzbekistan) Bunyodkor | 2 | 2008, 2012 |
| (Japan) Gamba Osaka | 2 | **2008**, 2015 |
| (Japan) Yokohama F. Marinos | 2 | **1989–90**, **2023–24** |
| (United Arab Emirates) Shabab Al-Ahli | 2 | **2015**, 2025–26 |
| (Japan) Vissel Kobe | 2 | 2020, 2025–26 |
| (Malaysia) Selangor | 1 | **1967** |
| (South Korea) Korea Tungsten FC | 1 | 1967 |
| (South Korea) Yangzee | 1 | **1969** |
| (Japan) Sanfrecce Hiroshima | 1 | 1969 |
| (India) Mysore State | 1 | 1969 |
| (Indonesia) PSMS Medan | 1 | 1970 |
| (Lebanon) Homenetmen Beirut | 1 | 1970 |
| (Iraq) Aliyat Al-Shorta | 1 | **1971** |
| (South Korea) ROK Army | 1 | 1971 |
| (Indonesia) Krama Yudha Tiga Berlian | 1 | 1985 |
| (Syria) Al-Ittihad | 1 | 1985 |
| (Iraq) Al-Talaba | 1 | 1986 |
| (Japan) JEF United Chiba | 1 | **1986** |
| (Iraq) Al-Rasheed | 1 | **1988–89** |
| (India) Mohun Bagan | 1 | **1988–89** |
| (North Korea) April 25 | 1 | 1990–91 |
| (Indonesia) Pelita Jaya | 1 | 1990–91 |
| (United Arab Emirates) Al-Shabab | 1 | 1991 |
| (Qatar) Al-Rayyan | 1 | 1991 |
| (United Arab Emirates) Al-Wasl | 1 | 1992–93 |
| (Iran) PAS Tehran | 1 | **1992–93** |
| Oman Club | 1 | **1993–94** |
| (Qatar) Al-Arabi | 1 | **1994–95** |
| (Uzbekistan) Neftchy Farg'ona | 1 | 1994–95 |
| (Iran) Saipa | 1 | 1995 |
| (Iraq) Al-Zawraa | 1 | 1996–97 |
| (Kazakhstan) Irtysh | 1 | 2000–01 |
| (Uzbekistan) Nasaf | 1 | 2001–02 |
| (Thailand) Police Tero | 1 | **2002–03** |
| (China) Shenzhen | 1 | 2005 |
| (Kuwait) Al-Qadsia | 1 | 2006 |
| (Syria) Al-Karamah | 1 | **2006** |
| (United Arab Emirates) Al-Wahda | 1 | 2007 |
| (Iran) Sepahan | 1 | **2007** |
| (Australia) Adelaide United | 1 | **2008** |
| (Qatar) Umm-Salal | 1 | 2009 |
| (Japan) Nagoya Grampus | 1 | 2009 |
| (Iran) Zob Ahan | 1 | **2010** |
| (Japan) Kashiwa Reysol | 1 | 2013 |
| (Australia) Western Sydney Wanderers | 1 | **2014** |
| (Qatar) El-Jaish | 1 | 2016 |
| (China) Shanghai Port | 1 | 2017 |
| (Japan) Kashima Antlers | 1 | **2018** |
| (Qatar) Al-Duhail | 1 | 2022 |
| (Japan) Kawasaki Frontale | 1 | **2024–25** |
| (Japan) Machida Zelvia | 1 | **2025–26** |

Year(s) in Bold: Team was finalist

==== AFC Champions League era ====
| Team | No. | Years |
|---|---|---|
| (Saudi Arabia) Al-Hilal | 8 | 2010, **2014**, 2015, **2017**, **2019**, **2021**, **2022**, 2024, 2025 |
| (Saudi Arabia) Al-Ittihad | 5 | **2004**, **2005**, **2009**, 2011, 2012 |
| (South Korea) Jeonbuk Hyundai Motors | 5 | 2004, **2006**, **2011**, **2016**, 2022 |
| (Japan) Urawa Red Diamonds | 5 | **2007**, 2008, **2017**, **2019**, **2022** |
| (United Arab Emirates) Al-Ain | 5 | **2003**, **2005**, 2014, **2016**, **2024** |
| (South Korea) Ulsan HD | 5 | 2006, **2012**, **2020**, 2021, 2024 |
| (South Korea) Seongnam FC | 3 | **2004**, 2007, **2010** |
| (South Korea) FC Seoul | 3 | **2013**, 2014, 2016 |
| (China) Guangzhou | 3 | **2013**, **2015**, 2019 |
| (Qatar) Al-Sadd | 3 | **2011**, 2018, 2019 |
| (Iran) Persepolis | 3 | 2017, **2018**, **2020** |
| (Saudi Arabia) Al-Nassr | 3 | 2020, 2021, 2025 |
| (Saudi Arabia) Al-Ahli | 3 | **2012**, **2025**, **2026** |
| (Uzbekistan) Pakhtakor | 2 | 2003, 2004 |
| (Uzbekistan) Bunyodkor | 2 | 2008, 2012 |
| (Japan) Gamba Osaka | 2 | **2008**, 2015 |
| (South Korea) Suwon Samsung Bluewings | 2 | 2011, 2018 |
| (South Korea) Pohang Steelers | 2 | **2009**, **2021** |
| (United Arab Emirates) Shabab Al-Ahli | 2 | **2015**, 2026 |
| (Japan) Vissel Kobe | 2 | 2020, 2026 |
| (Thailand) Police Tero | 1 | **2003** |
| (China) Dalian Shide | 1 | 2003 |
| (China) Shenzhen | 1 | 2005 |
| (South Korea) Busan IPark | 1 | 2005 |
| (Kuwait) Al-Qadsia | 1 | 2006 |
| (Syria) Al-Karamah | 1 | **2006** |
| (United Arab Emirates) Al-Wahda | 1 | 2007 |
| (Iran) Sepahan | 1 | **2007** |
| (Australia) Adelaide United | 1 | **2008** |
| (Japan) Nagoya Grampus | 1 | 2009 |
| (Qatar) Umm-Salal | 1 | 2009 |
| (Iran) Zob Ahan | 1 | **2010** |
| (Saudi Arabia) Al-Shabab | 1 | 2010 |
| (Iran) Esteghlal | 1 | 2013 |
| (Japan) Kashiwa Reysol | 1 | 2013 |
| (Australia) Western Sydney Wanderers | 1 | **2014** |
| (Qatar) El-Jaish | 1 | 2016 |
| (China) Shanghai Port | 1 | 2017 |
| (Japan) Kashima Antlers | 1 | **2018** |
| (Qatar) Al Duhail | 1 | 2022 |
| (Japan) Yokohama F. Marinos | 1 | **2024** |
| (Japan) Kawasaki Frontale | 1 | **2025** |
| (Japan) Machida Zelvia | 1 | **2026** |

Year(s) in Bold: Team was finalist

=== Unbeaten sides ===
- Fifteen clubs have won either the Asian Club Championship or the Champions League Elite unbeaten, and only four clubs have done so twice:
  - (Israel) Maccabi Tel Aviv in 1969 and 1971
  - (Iran) Esteghlal in 1970 and 1990–91
  - (Saudi Arabia) Al-Hilal in 1991–92 and 1999–2000
  - (South Korea) Ulsan Hyundai in 2012 and 2020
- Eleven other teams have been undefeated in a single season:
  - (Israel) Hapoel Tel Aviv in 1967
  - (South Korea) Daewoo Royals in 1985
  - (Japan) Furukawa Electric in 1986–87
  - (China) Liaoning in 1989–90
  - (Thailand) Thai Farmers Bank in 1993–94
  - (South Korea) Ilhwa Chunma in 1995
  - (South Korea) Suwon Samsung Bluewings in 2001–02
  - (Saudi Arabia) Al-Ittihad in 2005
  - (Japan) Urawa Red Diamonds in 2007
  - (Japan) Gamba Osaka in 2008
  - (Saudi Arabia) Al-Ahli in 2024–25
- (Saudi Arabia) Al-Ahli have the record number of consecutive unbeaten games with **22 matches** between 18 April 2021 and 4 November 2025.

=== Consecutive appearances ===
- (Saudi Arabia) Al-Hilal have the record number of consecutive participations in the AFC Champions League with **12 Times** since 2009 .

=== Biggest wins ===
The following teams won a single match with goal difference of 8 or more in the AFC Champions League era:

| Date | Winning team | Score | Losing team | Venue |
|---|---|---|---|---|
| 11 May 2004 | Seongnam Ilhwa Chunma (South Korea) | 15–0 | (Indonesia) Persik Kediri | (South Korea) Seongnam Stadium |
| 22 March 2006 | Gamba Osaka (Japan) | 15–0 | (Vietnam) Da Nang | (Japan) Osaka Expo '70 Stadium |
| 9 March 2010 | Changchun Yatai (China) | 9–0 | (Indonesia) Persipura Jayapura | (China) Changchun City Stadium |
| 9 February 2016 | FC Tokyo (Japan) | 9–0 | (Thailand) Chonburi | (Japan) Ajinomoto Stadium |
| 1 July 2021 | Jeonbuk Hyundai Motors (South Korea) | 9–0 | (Singapore) Tampines Rovers | (Uzbekistan) Lokomotiv Stadium |
| 6 November 2023 | Sepahan (Iran) | 9–0 | (Uzbekistan) AGMK | (Iran) Azadi Stadium |
| 12 March 2008 | Kashima Antlers (Japan) | 9–1 | (Thailand) Krung Thai Bank | (Thailand) Chulalongkorn University Sports Stadium |
| 9 April 2008 | Krung Thai Bank (Thailand) | 9–1 | (Vietnam) Nam Dinh | (Thailand) Chulalongkorn University Sports Stadium |
| 9 March 2005 | Busan I'Park (South Korea) | 8–0 | (Vietnam) Bình Ðịnh | (South Korea) Busan Asiad Stadium |
| 14 April 2010 | Jeonbuk Hyundai Motors (South Korea) | 8–0 | (Indonesia) Persipura Jayapura | (South Korea) Jeonju World Cup Stadium |
| 29 June 2021 | Kawasaki Frontale (Japan) | 8–0 | (Philippines) United City | (Uzbekistan) Lokomotiv Stadium |
| 18 April 2022 | Kawasaki Frontale (Japan) | 8–0 | (China) Guangzhou | (Malaysia) Tan Sri Dato' Haji Hassan Yunos Stadium |

=== Biggest two-legged wins ===
The following teams won two-legged matches with goal difference of 5 or more in the knock-out rounds of AFC Champions League era:

| Round | Winning team | Score | Losing team |
|---|---|---|---|
| 2004 Quarter-finals | Seongnam Ilhwa Chunma (South Korea) | 11–2 | (United Arab Emirates) Sharjah |
| 2013 Semi-finals | Guangzhou Evergrande (China) | 8–1 | (Japan) Kashiwa Reysol |
| 2005 Semi-finals | Al-Ittihad (Saudi Arabia) | 7–0 | (South Korea) Busan I'Park |
| 2006 Quarter-finals | Ulsan Hyundai Horang-i (South Korea) | 7–0 | (Saudi Arabia) Al Shabab |
| 2005 Semi-finals | Al Ain (United Arab Emirates) | 6–0 | (China) Shenzhen Jianlibao |
| 2005 Quarter-finals | Al-Ittihad (Saudi Arabia) | 8–3 | (China) Shandong Luneng |
| 2009 Semi-finals | Al-Ittihad (Saudi Arabia) | 8–3 | (Japan) Nagoya Grampus |
| 2018 Round of 16 | Al Duhail (Qatar) | 8–3 | (United Arab Emirates) Al-Ain |
| 2017 Round of 16 | Kawasaki Frontale (Japan) | 7–2 | (Thailand) Muangthong United |
| 2013 Quarter-finals | Guangzhou Evergrande (China) | 6–1 | (Qatar) Lekhwiya |
| 2008 Final | Gamba Osaka (Japan) | 5–0 | (Australia) Adelaide United |
| 2012 Quarter-finals | Ulsan Hyundai (South Korea) | 5–0 | (Saudi Arabia) Al-Hilal |
| 2016 Quarter-finals | Jeonbuk Hyundai Motors (South Korea) | 5–0 | (China) Shanghai SIPG |
| 2018 Quarter-finals | Kashima Antlers (Japan) | 5–0 | (China) Tianjin Quanjian |

=== Specific group stage records (2002–2024) ===
==== Goals ====
- Most goals scored in a group stage: **28**
  - (Japan) Kashima Antlers (2008)
- Fewest goals scored in a group stage: **0**
  - (Japan) Tokyo Verdy (2006)
  - (Iran) Shahr Khodro (2020)
  - (Thailand) Ratchaburi Mitr Phol (2021)
  - (China) Guangzhou (2022)
- Fewest goals conceded in a group stage: **0**
  - (Uzbekistan) Pakhtakor (2002–03)
  - (United Arab Emirates) Al-Wahda (2004)
  - (South Korea) Busan IPark (2005)
  - (South Korea) Ulsan Hyundai (2006)
- Most goals conceded in a group stage: **29**
  - (Indonesia) Persipura Jayapura (2010)
- Highest goal difference in a group stage: **+25**
  - (South Korea) Busan IPark (2005)
  - (Japan) Kashima Antlers (2008)
- Lowest goal difference in a group stage: **–26**
  - (Vietnam) Da Nang (2006)
  - (Singapore) Tampines Rovers (2021)

==== Six wins ====
- (China) Shandong Luneng Taishan, 2005 (reached the quarter-finals)
- (South Korea) Busan IPark, 2005 (reached the semi-finals)
- (Japan) Kashima Antlers, 2010 (reached the round of 16)
- (Qatar) Al-Duhail, 2018 (reached the quarter-finals)
- (Japan) Kawasaki Frontale, 2021 (reached the round of 16)
- (South Korea) Ulsan Hyundai, 2021 (reached the semi-finals)

==== Six losses ====
- (Uzbekistan) Neftchi, 2004 with a goal difference of –13.
- (Syria) Al-Wahda, 2005 with a goal difference of –11.
- (Vietnam) Hoang Anh Gia Lai, 2005 with a goal difference of –24.
- (Vietnam) Da Nang, 2006 with a goal difference of –26.
- (Vietnam) Gach Dong Tam Long An, 2007 with a goal difference of –14.
- (Qatar) Al-Arabi, 2012 with a goal difference of –12.
- (United Arab Emirates) Al-Wasl, 2018 with a goal difference of –7.
- (China) Guangzhou, 2021 with a goal difference of –16, and 2022 with a goal difference of –24.
- (Philippines) Kaya–Iloilo, 2021 with a goal difference of –14.
- (Singapore) Tampines Rovers, 2021 with a goal difference of –26.
- (Philippines) Kaya–Iloilo, 2022 with a goal difference of –16, and 2023–24 with a goal difference of –17.
- (India) Mumbai City, 2023–24 with a goal difference of –16.
- (Thailand) BG Pathum United, 2023–24 with a goal difference of –13.
- (Uzbekistan) AGMK, 2023–24 with a goal difference of –17.

==== Advancing past the group stage ====
- (Saudi Arabia) Al-Hilal holds the record for the most consecutive seasons advancing past the group stage with 9 from 2009 to 2017.

==== Biggest disparity between group winner and runner-up ====
The biggest points difference between the first- and second-placed teams in an AFC Champions League group stage is eleven points, achieved by:

- (Qatar) Al-Duhail, 18 points in 2018 (2nd Zob Ahan 7 points). Al-Duhail would go on to lose to Persepolis in the quarter-finals.

=== Specific league stage records (since 2024) ===
==== Goals ====
- Most goals scored: **26** – (Saudi Arabia) Al-Hilal (2024–25)
- Fewest goals scored: **2** – (China) Shanghai Port (2025–26)
- Fewest goals conceded: **4** – (Iran) Tractor (2025–26)
- Most goals conceded: **22** – (United Arab Emirates) Al Ain (2024–25)
- Highest goal difference: **+19** – (Saudi Arabia) Al-Hilal (2024–25)
- Lowest goal difference: **–14**
  - (Iraq) Al-Shorta (2025–26)
  - (Qatar) Al-Gharafa (2025–26)

==== Points and results ====
- Highest points achieved: **22**
  - (Saudi Arabia) Al-Hilal (2024–25 and 2025–26)
  - (Saudi Arabia) Al-Ahli (2024–25)
- Lowest points achieved: **1** – (Australia) Central Coast Mariners (2024–25)
- Most wins: **7**
  - (Saudi Arabia) Al-Hilal (2024–25 and 2025–26)
  - (Saudi Arabia) Al-Ahli (2024–25)
- Most draws: **4**
  - (Uzbekistan) Pakhtakor (2024–25)
  - (Iran) Persepolis (2024–25)
  - (China) Shanghai Port (2025–26)
  - (South Korea) FC Seoul (2025–26)
- Most defeats: **6**
  - (Australia) Central Coast Mariners (2024–25)
  - (South Korea) Ulsan HD (2024–25)
  - (United Arab Emirates) Al Ain (2024–25)
  - (China) Shanghai Shenhua (2025–26)
  - (Qatar) Al-Gharafa (2025–26)
  - (Uzbekistan) Nasaf (2025–26)

== Players ==
=== Most wins ===
List of players with more than one title
| Number of titles | Player | Club(s) |
|---|---|---|
| 3 | An Ik-soo | Ilhwa Chunma (1995); Pohang Steelers (1997, 1998) |
| 3 | Kwoun Sun-tae | Jeonbuk Hyundai Motors (2006, 2016); Kashima Antlers (2018) |
| 2 | Mohammed Noor; Ahmed Dokhi; Hamzah Idris; Saud Kariri; Tcheco; Redha Tukar; Manaf Abushgeer; Osama Al-Muwallad; Hamad Al-Montashari | Al-Ittihad (2004, 2005) |
| 2 | Namkung Do | Pohang Steelers (2009); Seongnam Ilhwa Chunma (2010) |
| 2 | Elkeson; Feng Xiaoting; Huang Bowen; Kim Young-gwon; Li Shuai; Liao Lisheng; Rong Hao; Gao Lin; Zeng Cheng; Zhang Linpeng; Zhao Xuri; Zheng Long; Zheng Zhi | Guangzhou Evergrande (2013, 2015) |
| 2 | Shin Hyung-min | Pohang Steelers (2009); Jeonbuk Hyundai Motors (2016) |
| 2 | Kim Shin-wook; Lee Ho | Ulsan Hyundai (2012); Jeonbuk Hyundai Motors (2016) |
| 2 | Yuki Abe; Tadaaki Hirakawa | Urawa Red Diamonds (2007, 2017) |
| 2 | Jung Seung-hyun | Kashima Antlers (2018); Ulsan Hyundai (2020) |
| 2 | Abdullah Al-Mayouf; Salman Al-Faraj; Abdullah Otayf; Mohammed Al-Breik; Yasser Al-Shahrani; Salem Al-Dawsari; Saleh Al-Shehri; Bafétimbi Gomis; Ali Al Bulaihi; Nasser Al-Dawsari; André Carrillo; Jang Hyun-soo; Mohamed Kanno; Mohammed Jahfali; Amiri Kurdi | Al-Hilal (2019, 2021) |
| 2 | Abdullah Abdoh; Abdulrahman Al-Sanbi; Ali Majrashi; Roger Ibañez; Édouard Mendy; Eid Al-Muwallad; Fahad Al-Rashidi; Firas Al-Buraikan; Franck Kessié; Galeno; Ivan Toney; Matteo Dams; Merih Demiral; Mohammed Sulaiman; Rayan Hamed; Riyad Mahrez; Ziyad Al-Johani | Al-Ahli (2024–25, 2025–26) |

=== Appearances ===
As of 4 November 2026

The table below does not include appearances made in the qualification stage of the competition.

| Rank | Player | Nation | Apps | Years | Club(s) |
|---|---|---|---|---|---|
| 1 | Salem Al-Dawsari | Saudi Arabia | 111 | 2012–present | Al-Hilal |
| 2 | Yasser Al-Shahrani | Saudi Arabia | 100 | 2012–present | Al-Hilal, Al-Qadsiah |
| 3 | Huang Bowen | China | 93 | 2008–2020 | Beijing Guoan, Jeonbuk Hyundai Motors, Guangzhou Evergrande |
| 3 | Abdullah Al-Mayouf | Saudi Arabia | 93 | 2010–2024 | Al-Ahli, Al-Hilal, Al-Ittihad |
| 5 | Nam Tae-hee | South Korea | 91 | 2012–2024 | Al-Duhail, Al-Sadd, Yokohama F. Marinos |
| 5 | Khalid Eisa | United Arab Emirates | 91 | 2010–present | Al-Jazira, Al-Ain |
| 7 | Salman Al-Faraj | Saudi Arabia | 89 | 2010–2024 | Al-Hilal |
| 8 | Mohammad Al-Shalhoub | Saudi Arabia | 87 | 2003–2019 | Al-Hilal |
| 8 | Hassan Al-Haydos | Qatar | 87 | 2017–present | Al-Sadd |
| 10 | Karim Boudiaf | Qatar | 86 | 2012–2026 | Al-Duhail |

=== Goalscoring ===
==== All-time top goalscorers ====
As of 4 November 2026
The table below does not include goals scored in the qualification stage of the competition.

| Rank | Player | Goals | Apps | Ratio | Years | Club(s) |
|---|---|---|---|---|---|---|
| 1 | (Montenegro) Dejan Damjanović | 42 | 77 | 0.55 | 2009–2022 | FC Seoul, Beijing Guoan, Suwon Samsung Bluewings, Kitchee |
| 2 | (South Korea) Lee Dong-gook | 37 | 74 | 0.5 | 2010–2020 | Jeonbuk Hyundai Motors |
| 3 | (Saudi Arabia) Salem Al-Dawsari | 36 | 111 | 0.32 | 2012–present | Al-Hilal |
| 4 | (Saudi Arabia) Nasser Al-Shamrani | 32 | 56 | 0.57 | 2006–2019 | Al-Shabab, Al-Hilal, Al-Ittihad, Al-Ain |
| 5 | (China) Elkeson | 30 | 69 | 0.43 | 2013–2020 | Guangzhou Evergrande, Shanghai SIPG |
| 6 | (Morocco) Abderrazak Hamdallah | 28 | 45 | 0.62 | 2015–2024 | Guangzhou R&F, El Jaish, Al-Rayyan, Al Nassr, Al-Ittihad |
| 6 | (Algeria) Baghdad Bounedjah | 28 | 47 | 0.6 | 2018–present | Al-Sadd, Al-Shamal |
| 8 | (Japan) Shinzo Koroki | 27 | 73 | 0.37 | 2008–2023 | Kashima Antlers, Urawa Red Diamonds |
| 9 | (China) Ricardo Goulart | 25 | 42 | 0.6 | 2015–2020 | Guangzhou Evergrande |
| 10 | (Syria) Omar Al Somah | 23 | 33 | 0.7 | 2015–2021 | Al-Ahli |

==== Final tournaments scorers per season ====
The top scorers of the final stage during the AFC Champions Cup editions (until 2002) were as below.

| Year | Player | Club | Goals | Ref. |
|---|---|---|---|---|
| 1990–91 | (China) Sun Wie | (China) Liaoning | 4 | |
| 1996–97 | (South Korea) Park Tae-ha | (South Korea) Pohang Steelers | 3 | |
| 1997–98 | (China) Hao Haidong | (China) Dalian Shide | 3 | |
| 1998–99 | (China) Hao Haidong (China) Yan Song | (China) Dalian Shide | 3 | |
| 1999–00 | (Brazil) Sergio Ricardo | (Saudi Arabia) Al Hilal | 4 | |
| 2000–01 | (South Korea) Seo Jung-won (South Korea) Ko Jong-soo (Japan) Masashi Nakayama | (South Korea) Suwon Samsung Bluewings (South Korea) Suwon Samsung Bluewings (Japan) Júbilo Iwata | 4 | |
| 2001–02 | (Iran) Faraz Fatemi | (Iran) Esteghlal | 5 | |

==== Top scorer awards ====
- Most top scorers by team: 3 – (Saudi Arabia) Al-Hilal:
  - (Syria) Omar Kharbin in 2017
  - (France) Bafétimbi Gomis in 2019
  - (Saudi Arabia) Salem Al-Dawsari in 2024–25
- Most top scorers by nation: 8 – Brazil:
  - (Brazil) Magno Alves in 2006
  - (Brazil) Mota in 2007
  - (Brazil) Leandro in 2009
  - (Brazil) José Mota in 2010
  - (Brazil) Ricardo Oliveira in 2012
  - (Brazil) Muriqui in 2013
  - (Brazil) Ricardo Goulart in 2015
  - (Brazil) Adriano in 2016

==== Hat-tricks ====
Two players – Adriano and Ricardo Goulart – have scored three hat-tricks in the competition.

Key
| ^{4} | Player scored four goals |

| Player | For | Against | Result | Date |
|---|---|---|---|---|
| (South Korea) Kim Do-hoon | (South Korea) Seongnam Ilhwa Chunma | (Thailand) Osotsapa | 6–0 | 9 March 2003 |
| (China) Hao Haidong^{4} | (China) Dalian Shide | (Thailand) Osotsapa | 7–1 | 12 March 2003 |
| (Cameroon) Patrick Suffo | (Saudi Arabia) Al-Hilal | (Iran) Esteghlal | 3–2 | 12 March 2003 |
| (Thailand) Kiatisuk Senamuang | (Vietnam) Hoang Anh Gia Lai | (Indonesia) PSM Makassar | 5–1 | 11 February 2004 |
| (South Korea) Kim Yeon-gun | (South Korea) Jeonbuk Hyundai Motors | (Thailand) BEC Tero Sasana | 4–0 | 7 April 2004 |
| (Brazil) Edu Sales | (South Korea) Jeonbuk Hyundai Motors | (Thailand) BEC Tero Sasana | 4–0 | 20 April 2004 |
| (Saudi Arabia) Marzouk Al-Otaibi | (Saudi Arabia) Al-Ittihad | (Iran) Sepahan | 4–0 | 20 April 2004 |
| (Croatia) Jasenko Sabitović^{4} | (South Korea) Seongnam Ilhwa Chunma | (Indonesia) Persik Kediri | 15–0 | 11 May 2004 |
| (Russia) Denis Laktionov^{4} | (South Korea) Seongnam Ilhwa Chunma | (Indonesia) Persik Kediri | 15–0 | 11 May 2004 |
| (South Korea) Kim Do-hoon | (South Korea) Seongnam Ilhwa Chunma | (Indonesia) Persik Kediri | 15–0 | 11 May 2004 |
| (Syria) Mohamed Al-Zeno | (Syria) Al-Jaish | (Iraq) Al-Zawraa | 5–1 | 5 April 2005 |
| (Iran) Mohsen Bayatinia | (Iran) PAS Tehran | (Kuwait) Al-Salmiya | 5–1 | 6 April 2005 |
| (Iran) Rasoul Khatibi | (Iran) Sepahan | (Syria) Al-Wahda | 3–1 | 6 April 2005 |
| (China) Zheng Zhi | (China) Shandong Luneng | (Indonesia) PSM Makassar | 6–1 | 20 April 2005 |
| (Nigeria) Onyekachi Nwoha | (United Arab Emirates) Al-Ain | (China) Shenzhen Jianlibao | 6–0 | 28 September 2005 |
| (Brazil) Fernandinho^{4} | (Japan) Gamba Osaka | (Vietnam) Da Nang | 15–0 | 22 March 2006 |
| (Brazil) Magno Alves^{4} | (Japan) Gamba Osaka | (Vietnam) Da Nang | 15–0 | 22 March 2006 |
| (China) Gao Lin | (China) Shanghai Shenhua | (Vietnam) Dong Tam Long An | 4–2 | 3 May 2006 |
| (Bahrain) A'ala Hubail | (Qatar) Al-Gharafa | (United Arab Emirates) Al-Wahda | 5–3 | 17 May 2006 |
| (Uruguay) Diego Alonso | (China) Shanghai Shenhua | (Indonesia) Persik Kediri | 6–0 | 23 May 2007 |
| (Australia) Travis Dodd | (Australia) Adelaide United | (Vietnam) Dong Tam Long An | 3–0 | 23 May 2007 |
| (Brazil) Marquinhos | (Japan) Kashima Antlers | (Thailand) Krung Thai Bank | 9–1 | 12 March 2008 |
| (Ivory Coast) Koné Kassim^{4} | (Thailand) Krung Thai Bank | (Vietnam) Nam Dinh | 9–1 | 9 April 2008 |
| (Thailand) Nantawat Tansopa | (Thailand) Krung Thai Bank | (Vietnam) Nam Dinh | 9–1 | 9 April 2008 |
| (Thailand) Nantawat Tansopa^{4} | (Thailand) Krung Thai Bank | (China) Beijing Guoan | 5–3 | 21 May 2008 |
| (Brazil) Tiago | (China) Beijing Guoan | (Thailand) Krung Thai Bank | 3–5 | 21 May 2008 |
| (Iraq) Luay Salah | (Iraq) Erbil | (Kuwait) Al-Qadsia | 4–2 | 21 May 2008 |
| (Chile) José Luis Villanueva | (Uzbekistan) Bunyodkor | (Iran) Saipa | 5–1 | 24 September 2008 |
| (Brazil) Leandro | (Japan) Gamba Osaka | (South Korea) FC Seoul | 4–2 | 17 April 2009 |
| (Brazil) Araújo | (Qatar) Al-Gharafa | (Iran) Persepolis | 5–1 | 21 April 2009 |
| (Ghana) Prince Tagoe | (Saudi Arabia) Al-Ettifaq | (United Arab Emirates) Al-Shabab | 4–1 | 21 April 2009 |
| (Montenegro) Dejan Damjanović | (South Korea) FC Seoul | (Indonesia) Sriwijaya | 5–1 | 5 May 2009 |
| (Brazil) Denilson | (South Korea) Pohang Steelers | (Australia) Central Coast Mariners | 3–2 | 5 May 2009 |
| (Saudi Arabia) Naif Hazazi | (Saudi Arabia) Al-Ittihad | (Qatar) Umm-Salal | 7–0 | 19 May 2009 |
| (South Korea) Choi Hyo-jin | (South Korea) Pohang Steelers | (Australia) Newcastle Jets | 6–0 | 24 June 2009 |
| (Saudi Arabia) Mohammed Noor | (Saudi Arabia) Al-Ittihad | (Japan) Nagoya Grampus | 6–2 | 21 October 2009 |
| (Croatia) Krunoslav Lovrek | (South Korea) Jeonbuk Hyundai Motors | (Indonesia) Persipura Jayapura | 4–1 | 23 February 2010 |
| (China) Gao Jian | (China) Changchun Yatai | (Indonesia) Persipura Jayapura | 9–0 | 9 March 2010 |
| (Costa Rica) Johnny Woodly | (China) Changchun Yatai | (Indonesia) Persipura Jayapura | 9–0 | 9 March 2010 |
| (Brazil) Leandro | (Qatar) Al-Sadd | (United Arab Emirates) Al-Ahli | 5–0 | 10 March 2010 |
| (Japan) Shoki Hirai | (Japan) Gamba Osaka | Singapore Armed Force | 4–2 | 23 March 2010 |
| (Uzbekistan) Odil Ahmedov | (Uzbekistan) Pakhtakor | (United Arab Emirates) Al-Ain | 3–2 | 13 April 2010 |
| (Brazil) Araújo | (Qatar) Al-Gharafa | (United Arab Emirates) Al-Jazira | 4–2 | 14 April 2010 |
| (South Korea) Sim Woo-yeon | (South Korea) Jeonbuk Hyundai Motors | (Indonesia) Persipura Jayapura | 8–0 | 14 April 2010 |
| (South Korea) Ha Tae-goon | (South Korea) Suwon Samsung Bluewings | (China) Shanghai Shenhua | 4–0 | 16 March 2011 |
| (Iraq) Younis Mahmoud | (Qatar) Al-Gharafa | (United Arab Emirates) Al-Jazira | 5–2 | 4 May 2011 |
| (Croatia) Krunoslav Lovrek | (South Korea) Jeonbuk Hyundai Motors | (Indonesia) Arema | 6–0 | 10 May 2011 |
| (South Korea) Lee Dong-gook^{4} | (South Korea) Jeonbuk Hyundai Motors | (Japan) Cerezo Osaka | 6–1 | 27 September 2011 |
| (Libya) Éamon Zayed | (Iran) Persepolis | (United Arab Emirates) Al Shabab | 6–1 | 21 March 2012 |
| (Brazil) Ricardo Oliveira | (United Arab Emirates) Al-Jazira | (Uzbekistan) Nasaf | 4–1 | 2 May 2012 |
| (Brazil) Ricardo Oliveira^{4} | (United Arab Emirates) Al-Jazira | (Qatar) Al-Rayyan | 4–3 | 16 May 2012 |
| (South Korea) Yoo Byung-soo^{4} | (Saudi Arabia) Al-Hilal | (United Arab Emirates) Baniyas | 7–1 | 23 May 2012 |
| (Brazil) Wagner Ribeiro | (Qatar) El-Jaish | (United Arab Emirates) Al-Jazira | 3–0 | 24 April 2013 |
| (Saudi Arabia) Nasser Al-Shamrani | (Saudi Arabia) Al-Hilal | (Qatar) Al-Sadd | 5–0 | 1 April 2014 |
| (Brazil) Chimba | (Iran) Foolad | (Saudi Arabia) Al-Fateh | 5–1 | 23 April 2014 |
| (Brazil) Ricardo Goulart | (China) Guangzhou Evergrande | (Australia) Western Sydney Wanderers | 3–2 | 4 March 2015 |
| (Brazil) Diogo | (Thailand) Buriram United | (China) Guangzhou R&F | 5–0 | 6 May 2015 |
| (Brazil) Adriano^{4} | (South Korea) FC Seoul | (Thailand) Buriram United | 6–0 | 23 February 2016 |
| (Brazil) Adriano | (South Korea) FC Seoul | (Japan) Sanfrecce Hiroshima | 4–1 | 1 March 2016 |
| (Iran) Mehdi Taremi | (Iran) Persepolis | (United Arab Emirates) Al-Wahda | 4–2 | 8 May 2017 |
| (Brazil) Ricardo Goulart | (China) Guangzhou Evergrande | (China) Shanghai SIPG | 5–1 | 12 September 2017 |
| (Syria) Omar Kharbin | (Saudi Arabia) Al-Hilal | (Iran) Persepolis | 4–0 | 26 September 2017 |
| (Brazil) Adriano | (South Korea) Jeonbuk Hyundai Motors | (Hong Kong) Kitchee | 6–0 | 20 February 2018 |
| (South Korea) Kim Shin-wook | (South Korea) Jeonbuk Hyundai Motors | (China) Tianjin Quanjian | 6–3 | 6 March 2018 |
| (Brazil) Ricardo Goulart^{4} | (China) Guangzhou Evergrande | (South Korea) Jeju United | 5–3 | 6 March 2018 |
| (Senegal) Mame Baba Thiam | (Iran) Esteghlal | (Iran) Zob Ahan | 3–1 | 15 May 2018 |
| (Democratic Republic of the Congo) Cédric Bakambu | (China) Beijing Guoan | (Thailand) Buriram United | 3–1 | 9 April 2019 |
| (Brazil) Leonardo^{4} | (United Arab Emirates) Al-Wahda | (Qatar) Al-Rayyan | 4–3 | 22 April 2019 |
| (Brazil) Oscar | (China) Shanghai SIPG | (South Korea) Ulsan Hyundai | 5–0 | 21 May 2019 |
| (France) Bafétimbi Gomis | (Saudi Arabia) Al-Hilal | (Saudi Arabia) Al-Ahli | 4–2 | 6 August 2019 |
| (Brazil) Welliton | (United Arab Emirates) Sharjah | (Saudi Arabia) Al-Taawoun | 6–0 | 21 September 2021 |
| (Kenya) Michael Olunga | (Qatar) Al-Duhail | (Iran) Esteghlal | 4–3 | 21 April 2021 |
| (Brazil) Gustavo^{4} | (South Korea) Jeonbuk Hyundai Motors | (Singapore) Tampines Rovers | 9–0 | 1 July 2021 |
| (The Gambia) Modou Barrow | (South Korea) Jeonbuk Hyundai Motors | (Singapore) Tampines Rovers | 9–0 | 1 July 2021 |
| (Japan) Kento Tachibanada | (Japan) Kawasaki Frontale | (Philippines) United City | 8–0 | 2 July 2021 |
| (Japan) Shuhei Kawasaki | (Japan) Gamba Osaka | (Singapore) Tampines Rovers | 8–1 | 8 July 2021 |
| (Brazil) Leandro Damião | (Japan) Kawasaki Frontale | (South Korea) Daegu FC | 3–1 | 9 July 2021 |
| (Poland) Jakub Świerczok | (Japan) Nagoya Grampus | (South Korea) Daegu FC | 4–2 | 14 September 2021 |
| (Belgium) Edmilson Junior | (Qatar) Al-Duhail | (Uzbekistan) Pakhtakor | 3–2 | 14 April 2022 |
| (Brazil) Zeca | (South Korea) Daegu FC | (China) Shandong Taishan | 7–0 | 15 April 2022 |
| (Brazil) Bergson | (Malaysia) Johor Darul Ta'zim | (China) Guangzhou | 5–0 | 15 April 2022 |
| (Saudi Arabia) Hattan Bahebri | (Saudi Arabia) Al Shabab | (India) Mumbai City | 6–0 | 18 April 2022 |
| (Turkmenistan) Arslanmyrat Amanow | (Turkmenistan) Ahal | (Qatar) Al-Gharafa | 4–2 | 26 April 2022 |
| (Nigeria) Odion Ighalo^{4} | (Saudi Arabia) Al-Hilal | (Qatar) Al-Duhail | 7–0 | 26 February 2023 |
| (Hungary) Martin Ádám | (South Korea) Ulsan Hyundai | (Thailand) BG Pathum United | 3–1 | 19 September 2023 |
| (Algeria) Baghdad Bounedjah | (Qatar) Al-Sadd | (Jordan) Al-Faisaly | 6–0 | 23 October 2023 |
| (Serbia) Aleksandar Mitrović | (Saudi Arabia) Al-Hilal | (India) Mumbai City | 6–0 | 23 October 2023 |
| (Brazil) Talisca | (Saudi Arabia) Al-Nassr | (Qatar) Al-Duhail | 3–2 | 7 November 2023 |
| (Brazil) Cryzan | (China) Shandong Taishan | (Philippines) Kaya–Iloilo | 6–1 | 28 November 2023 |
| (Morocco) Soufiane Rahimi | (United Arab Emirates) Al-Ain | (Saudi Arabia) Al-Hilal | 4–2 | 17 April 2024 |
| (Albania) Jasir Asani | (South Korea) Gwangju | (Japan) Yokohama F. Marinos | 7–3 | 17 September 2024 |
| (Saudi Arabia) Salem Al-Dawsari | (Saudi Arabia) Al-Hilal | (United Arab Emirates) Al-Ain | 5–4 | 21 October 2024 |
| (Morocco) Soufiane Rahimi | (United Arab Emirates) Al-Ain | (Saudi Arabia) Al-Hilal | 4–5 | 21 October 2024 |
| (Serbia) Aleksandar Mitrović | (Saudi Arabia) Al-Hilal | (Iran) Esteghlal | 3–0 | 4 November 2024 |
| (Argentina) Matías Vargas | (China) Shanghai Port | (South Korea) Ulsan HD | 3–1 | 26 November 2024 |
| (Brazil) Saulo Mineiro | (China) Shanghai Shenhua | (Japan) Vissel Kobe | 4–2 | 18 February 2025 |
| (Algeria) Adil Boulbina | (Qatar) Al-Duhail | (Saudi Arabia) Al-Ittihad | 4–2 | 24 November 2025 |
| (Spain) Rafa Mújica | (Qatar) Al-Sadd | (United Arab Emirates) Shabab Al Ahli | 4–2 | 23 December 2025 |
| (Algeria) Houssem Aouar | (Saudi Arabia) Al-Ittihad | (Qatar) Al-Gharafa | 7–0 | 10 February 2026 |
| (Serbia) Aleksandar Čavrić | (Japan) Kashima Antlers | (Australia) Newcastle Jets | 7–1 | 15 September 2026 |
| (Ghana) Prince Ampem | (China) Shanghai Port | (Thailand) Ratchaburi | 6–4 | 15 September 2026 |
| (Madagascar) Njiva Rakotoharimalala | (Thailand) Ratchaburi | (China) Shanghai Port | 4–6 | 15 September 2026 |
| (Thailand) Bordin Phala | (Thailand) Port | (China) Beijing Guoan | 7–4 | 3 November 2026 |

== See also ==
- AFC Cup and AFC Champions League Two records and statistics
- AFC President's Cup and AFC Challenge League records and statistics
