= AFC Cup and AFC Champions League Two records and statistics =

International football competition statistics

This page details all statistics of all seasons of the AFC Cup and AFC Champions League Two. These statistics do not include the qualifying rounds of the AFC Cup and AFC Champions League Two, unless otherwise noted.

== General performances ==
=== By club ===
Performances in the AFC Cup and AFC Champions League Two by club
Club	Winners	Runners-up	Years won	Years runners-up
Al-Kuwait	3	1	2009, 2012, 2013	2011
(Iraq) Al-Quwa Al-Jawiya	3	0	2016, 2017, 2018	
(Jordan) Al-Faisaly	2	1	2005, 2006	2007
(Bahrain) Al-Muharraq	2	1	2008, 2021	2006
(Kuwait) Al-Qadsia	1	2	2014	2010, 2013
(Uzbekistan) Nasaf Qarshi	1	1	2011	2021
(Lebanon) Al-Ahed	1	1	2019	2023–24
(Syria) Al-Jaish	1	0	2004	
(Jordan) Shabab Al-Ordon	1	0	2007	
(Syria) Al-Ittihad	1	0	2010	
(Malaysia) Johor Darul Ta'zim	1	0	2015	
(Oman) Al-Seeb	1	0	2022	
(Australia) Central Coast Mariners	1	0	2023–24	
(United Arab Emirates) Sharjah	1	0	2024–25	
(Japan) Gamba Osaka	1	0	2025–26	
(Iraq) Erbil	0	2		2012, 2014
(Tajikistan) Istiklol	0	2		2015, 2017
(Syria) Al-Wahda	0	1		2004
(Lebanon) Nejmeh	0	1		2005
(Lebanon) Safa	0	1		2008
(Syria) Al-Karamah	0	1		2009
(India) Bengaluru	0	1		2016
(Turkmenistan) Altyn Asyr	0	1		2018
(North Korea) April 25	0	1		2019
(Malaysia) Kuala Lumpur City	0	1		2022
(Singapore) Lion City Sailors	0	1		2024–25
(Saudi Arabia) Al-Nassr	0	1		2025–26

=== By nation ===
Nation	Winners	Runners-up	Winning clubs	Runners-up
Kuwait	4	3	Al-Kuwait (3); Al-Qadsia (1)	Al-Qadsia (2); Al-Kuwait (1)
Iraq	3	2	Al-Quwa Al-Jawiya (3)	Erbil (2)
Jordan	3	1	Al-Faisaly (2); Shabab Al-Ordon (1)	Al-Faisaly (1)
Syria	2	2	Al-Ittihad (1); Al-Jaish (1)	Al-Karamah (1); Al-Wahda (1)
Bahrain	2	1	Al-Muharraq (2)	Al-Muharraq (1)
Lebanon	1	3	Al-Ahed (1)	Al-Ahed (1); Nejmeh (1); Safa (1)
Uzbekistan	1	1	Nasaf (1)	Nasaf (1)
Malaysia	1	1	Johor Darul Ta'zim (1)	Kuala Lumpur City (1)
Oman	1	0	Al-Seeb (1)	—
Australia	1	0	Central Coast Mariners (1)	—
United Arab Emirates	1	0	Sharjah (1)	—
Japan	1	0	Gamba Osaka (1)	—
Tajikistan	0	2	—	Istiklol (2)
India	0	1	—	Bengaluru (1)
Turkmenistan	0	1	—	Altyn Asyr (1)
North Korea	0	1	—	April 25 (1)
Singapore	0	1	—	Lion City Sailors (1)
Saudi Arabia	0	1	—	Al-Nassr (1)

=== By city ===
Nation	Winners	Runners-up	Winning clubs	Runners-up
Kuwait City	4	3	Al-Kuwait (3), Al-Qadsia (1)	Al-Qadsia (2), Al-Kuwait (1)
(Jordan) Amman	3	1	Al-Faisaly (2), Shabab Al-Ordon (1)	Al-Faisaly (1)
(Iraq) Baghdad	3	0	Al-Quwa Al-Jawiya (3)	—
(Bahrain) Muharraq	2	1	Al-Muharraq (2)	Al-Muharraq (1)
(Lebanon) Beirut	1	3	Al-Ahed (1)	Al-Ahed (1), Nejmeh (1), Safa (1)
(Syria) Damascus	1	1	Al-Jaish (1)	Al-Wahda (1)
(Uzbekistan) Qarshi	1	1	Nasaf (1)	Nasaf (1)
(Syria) Aleppo	1	0	Al-Ittihad (1)	—
(Malaysia) Johor Bahru	1	0	Johor Darul Ta'zim (1)	—
(Oman) Seeb	1	0	Al-Seeb (1)	—
(Australia) Gosford	1	0	Central Coast Mariners (1)	—
(United Arab Emirates) Sharjah	1	0	Sharjah (1)	—
(Japan) Osaka	1	0	Gamba Osaka (1)	—
(Iraq) Erbil	0	2	—	Erbil (2)
(Tajikistan) Dushanbe	0	2	—	Istiklol (2)
(Syria) Homs	0	1	—	Al-Karamah (1)
(India) Bengaluru	0	1	—	Bengaluru (1)
(Turkmenistan) Ashgabat	0	1	—	Altyn Asyr (1)
(North Korea) Pyongyang	0	1	—	April 25 (1)
(Malaysia) Kuala Lumpur	0	1	—	Kuala Lumpur City (1)
(Singapore) Bishan	0	1	—	Lion City Sailors (1)
(Saudi Arabia) Riyadh	0	1	—	Al-Nassr (1)

=== All-time points table ===
Following statistical convention in football, matches decided in extra time are counted as wins and losses, while matches decided by penalty shoot-outs are counted as draws. Teams are ranked by total points, then by goal difference, then by goals scored. Only the top twenty five are listed (excludes qualifying rounds).

As of end of 2025–26 season

Rank	Club	Seasons	Pld	W	D	L	GF	GA	GD	Pts
1	Al-Kuwait	13	100	54	29	17	195	98	+97	191
2	(Jordan) Al-Wehdat	14	102	48	25	29	179	126	+53	169
3	(Singapore) Lion City Sailors	12	97	51	14	32	191	150	+41	167
4	(Jordan) Al-Faisaly	11	81	41	21	19	135	92	+43	144
5	(Singapore) Tampines Rovers	15	97	39	18	40	160	156	+4	135
6	(Kuwait) Al-Qadsia	8	67	36	19	12	127	59	+68	127
7	(Lebanon) Al Ahed	12	81	36	15	30	122	117	+5	123
8	(Bahrain) Al-Muharraq	8	63	35	12	16	112	72	+40	117
9	(Iraq) Erbil	6	57	34	13	10	118	52	+66	115
10	(Syria) Al-Jaish	10	68	29	23	16	74	56	+18	110
11	(Lebanon) Nejmeh	11	74	30	14	30	101	100	+1	104
12	(Hong Kong) Kitchee	7	55	26	10	19	100	67	+33	88
13	(Iraq) Al-Quwa Al-Jawiya	4	40	25	10	5	68	37	+31	85
14	(Malaysia) Johor Darul Ta'zim	5	42	24	6	12	85	49	+36	78
15	(Hong Kong) South China	7	53	23	8	22	97	79	+18	77
16	(Bahrain) Al-Riffa	7	46	23	8	15	74	61	+13	77
17	(Tajikistan) Istiklol	8	53	21	10	22	77	77	0	73
18	(Iraq) Al-Zawraa	6	42	20	11	11	63	46	+17	71
19	(Philippines) Ceres–Negros	5	40	20	10	10	87	46	+41	70
20	(Lebanon) Safa	6	44	21	7	16	58	54	+4	70
21	(Turkmenistan) Altyn Asyr	8	49	18	16	15	72	70	+2	70
22	(India) Bengaluru	5	40	21	5	14	59	46	+13	68
23	(Vietnam) Hanoi	4	35	19	9	7	73	41	+32	66
24	(Syria) Al-Wahda	7	48	17	14	17	64	58	+6	65
25	(Uzbekistan) Nasaf	4	32	20	4	8	77	30	+47	64

=== Participating clubs ===
A total of 247 clubs from 38 national associations have played in or qualified for the AFC Cup and AFC Champions League Two group stage since first season in 2004. Season in bold represents teams qualified for the knockout phase that season.

Nation	No.	Clubs	Seasons
Vietnam (16)	4	Hanoi	2011, **2014**, 2017, **2019**
Vietnam (16)	3	Sông Lam Nghệ An	**2011**, 2012, 2018
Vietnam (16)	3	Becamex Bình Dương	**2009**, **2010**, **2019**
Vietnam (16)	2	SHB Đà Nẵng	**2010**, **2013**
Vietnam (16)	2	Than Quảng Ninh	2017, 2020
Vietnam (16)	2	Nam Định	**2024–25**, 2025–26
Vietnam (16)	2	Thể Công–Viettel	**2022**, 2026–27
Vietnam (16)	1	Hòa Phát Hà Nội	2007
Vietnam (16)	1	Hà Nội ACB	2009
Vietnam (16)	1	Navibank Sài Gòn	2012
Vietnam (16)	1	Xuân Thành Sài Gòn	2013
Vietnam (16)	1	Vissai Ninh Bình	**2014**
Vietnam (16)	1	Thanh Hoá	2018
Vietnam (16)	1	Hồ Chí Minh City	2020
Vietnam (16)	1	Haiphong	2023–24
Vietnam (16)	1	Công An Hà Nội	**2025–26**
India (15)	9	East Bengal	**2004**, 2005, 2008, 2010, 2011, 2012, **2013**, 2015, 2026–27
India (15)	8	Mohun Bagan SG	2007, 2009, **2016**, 2017, **2021**, **2022**, 2023–24, 2025–26
India (15)	5	Dempo	2005, 2006, **2008**, **2009**, **2011**
India (15)	5	Bengaluru	**2015**, **2016**, **2017**, **2018**, 2021
India (15)	3	Mahindra United	2004, 2006, **2007**
India (15)	3	Churchill Brothers	**2010**, 2013, **2014**
India (15)	1	Salgaocar	2012
India (15)	1	Pune	2014
India (15)	1	Aizawl	2018
India (15)	1	Chennaiyin	2019
India (15)	1	Minerva Punjab	2019
India (15)	1	Chennai City	2020
India (15)	1	Gokulam Kerala	2022
India (15)	1	Odisha	**2023–24**
India (15)	1	Goa	2025–26
Malaysia (13)	7	Selangor	**2006**, 2010, **2013**, 2014, 2016, 2024–25, 2025–26
Malaysia (13)	5	Johor Darul Ta'zim	2009, **2015**, **2016**, **2017**, 2018
Malaysia (13)	3	Kelantan	**2012**, **2013**, 2014
Malaysia (13)	3	Pahang	2005, 2007, **2015**
Malaysia (13)	3	Kedah Darul Aman	**2008**, **2009**, **2022**
Malaysia (13)	2	Perak	**2004**, 2005
Malaysia (13)	2	Negeri Sembilan	2004, 2007
Malaysia (13)	2	Terengganu	**2012**, 2023–24
Malaysia (13)	1	Perlis	2006
Malaysia (13)	1	FELDA United	2017
Malaysia (13)	1	Kuala Lumpur City	**2022**
Malaysia (13)	1	Sabah	**2023–24**
Malaysia (13)	1	Kuching City	2026–27
Indonesia (11)	4	Bali United	2018, 2020, 2022, 2023–24
Indonesia (11)	4	PSM Makassar	**2019**, 2020, **2022**, 2023–24
Indonesia (11)	4	Persib Bandung	**2015**, 2024–25, **2025–26**, 2026–27
Indonesia (11)	3	Persipura Jayapura	**2011**, **2014**, **2015**
Indonesia (11)	2	Sriwijaya	**2010**, **2011**
Indonesia (11)	2	Arema	**2012**, **2014**
Indonesia (11)	2	Persija Jakarta	**2018**, 2019
Indonesia (11)	1	PSMS Medan	**2009**
Indonesia (11)	1	Persiwa Wamena	2010
Indonesia (11)	1	Persibo Bojonegoro	2013
Indonesia (11)	1	Semen Padang	**2013**
Syria (10)	10	Al-Jaish	**2004**, 2010, 2011, 2014, **2015**, **2016**, 2017, 2018, **2019**, 2020
Syria (10)	7	Al-Wahda	**2004**, 2014, **2015**, **2016**, **2017**, 2018, 2021
Syria (10)	5	Al-Ittihad	**2010**, 2011, 2012, 2019, 2023–24
Syria (10)	3	Al-Wahda	**2009**, **2010**, 2011
Syria (10)	2	Al-Shorta	**2012**, **2013**
Syria (10)	2	Tishreen	2021, 2022
Syria (10)	1	Al-Majd	**2009**
Syria (10)	1	Al-Wathba	2020
Syria (10)	1	Jableh	2022
Syria (10)	1	Al-Fotuwa	2023–24
Oman (10)	7	Al-Suwaiq	2009, 2011, **2012**, 2014, 2017, 2018, 2019
Oman (10)	6	Dhofar	2004, 2007, 2013, 2018, 2020, 2022
Oman (10)	5	Al-Nahda	**2008**, 2010, 2015, **2023–24**, 2026–27
Oman (10)	4	Al-Orouba	2009, 2011, 2012, 2016
Oman (10)	3	Fanja	**2013**, 2014, 2016
Oman (10)	2	Saham	2010, 2017
Oman (10)	2	Al-Seeb	**2022**, 2026–27
Oman (10)	1	Al-Nasr	**2006**
Oman (10)	1	Muscat	2007
Oman (10)	1	Sur	2008
Jordan (9)	14	Al-Wehdat	**2006**, **2007**, 2008, 2009, 2010, **2011**, **2012**, **2015**, **2016**, **2017**, **2019**, 2023–24, **2024–25**, 2025–26
Jordan (9)	12	Al-Faisaly	**2005**, **2006**, **2007**, 2009, **2011**, 2012, **2013**, **2016**, **2018**, 2020, 2021, 2026–27
Jordan (9)	4	Shabab Al-Ordon	**2007**, 2008, **2010**, 2014
Jordan (9)	4	Al-Jazeera	**2015**, **2018**, **2019**, 2020
Jordan (9)	4	Al-Hussein	**2005**, **2024–25**, **2025–26**, 2026–27
Jordan (9)	1	Al-Ramtha	2013
Jordan (9)	1	That Ras	**2014**
Jordan (9)	1	Al-Ahli	2017
Jordan (9)	1	Al-Salt	**2021**
Hong Kong (9)	8	Kitchee	2008, **2012**, **2013**, **2014**, **2015**, **2016**, 2019, 2026–27
Hong Kong (9)	7	South China	2008, **2009**, **2010**, 2011, 2014, **2015**, **2016**
Hong Kong (9)	6	Eastern	2009, 2021, **2022**, 2024–25, 2025–26
Hong Kong (9)	4	Happy Valley	2004, 2005, 2006, 2007
Hong Kong (9)	4	Sun Hei	**2005**, **2006**, **2007**, 2013
Hong Kong (9)	4	Tai Po	2010, 2019, 2025–26, 2026–27
Hong Kong (9)	3	Lee Man	**2021**, 2022, 2024–25
Hong Kong (9)	1	TSW Pegasus	2011
Hong Kong (9)	1	Citizen	2012
Bahrain (9)	9	Al-Muharraq	**2006**, 2007, **2008**, 2009, **2016**, 2017, **2021**, 2025–26, 2026–27
Bahrain (9)	7	Al-Riffa	**2010**, **2013**, **2014**, 2015, 2020, **2022**, **2023–24**
Bahrain (9)	5	Al-Hidd	**2014**, 2015, 2016, 2017, 2021
Bahrain (9)	3	Al-Khaldiya	**2024–25**, 2025–26, 2026–27
Bahrain (9)	2	Al-Najma	2008, 2019
Bahrain (9)	2	Malkiya	2018, 2019
Bahrain (9)	2	Manama	2018, 2020
Bahrain (9)	1	Busaiteen	**2009**
Bahrain (9)	1	East Riffa	**2022**
Turkmenistan (8)	8	Altyn Asyr	2016, 2017, **2018**, **2019**, 2021, 2022, 2023–24, 2024–25
Turkmenistan (8)	4	Ahal	2015, 2018, **2021**, 2025–26
Turkmenistan (8)	3	Nebitçi	2004, 2005, 2007
Turkmenistan (8)	2	Nisa Aşgabat	2004, 2005
Turkmenistan (8)	2	HTTU Aşgabat	2006, 2007
Turkmenistan (8)	2	Merw Mary	2006, 2023–24
Turkmenistan (8)	2	Arkadag	**2025–26**, 2026–27
Turkmenistan (8)	1	Köpetdag	2022
Iraq (8)	6	Erbil	**2009**, **2011**, **2012**, **2013**, **2014**, 2015
Iraq (8)	6	Al-Zawraa	**2009**, **2012**, **2017**, 2018, 2023–24, **2025–26**
Iraq (8)	4	Al-Quwa Al-Jawiya	**2016**, **2017**, **2018**, 2024–25
Iraq (8)	3	Al-Shorta	2014, **2015**, 2026–27
Iraq (8)	2	Duhok	**2011**, **2013**
Iraq (8)	1	Al-Talaba	2011
Iraq (8)	1	Naft Al-Wasat	**2016**
Iraq (8)	1	Al-Kahrabaa	**2023–24**
Yemen (8)	3	Al-Hilal	2007, 2009, 2010
Yemen (8)	3	Al-Tilal	2009, 2011, 2012
Yemen (8)	2	Al-Ahli Sana'a	2008, 2010
Yemen (8)	2	Al-Saqr	2007, 2011
Yemen (8)	2	Shaab Ibb	2004, 2013
Yemen (8)	1	Al-Sha'ab Hadramaut	2008
Yemen (8)	1	Al-Oruba	2012
Yemen (8)	1	Al-Ahli Taizz	2013
Thailand (8)	3	Chonburi	**2009**, **2011**, **2012**
Thailand (8)	3	Muangthong United	**2010**, **2011**, **2024–25**
Thailand (8)	2	Port	**2010**, **2024–25**
Thailand (8)	2	Bangkok United	**2024–25, 2025–26**
Thailand (8)	2	BG Pathum United	2025–26, 2026–27
Thailand (8)	1	Osotsapa	2007
Thailand (8)	1	PEA	2009
Thailand (8)	1	Ratchaburi	**2025–26**
Lebanon (7)	12	Al Ahed	**2005**, 2006, 2009, 2010, **2011**, 2012, **2016**, **2018**, **2019**, 2020, **2021**, **2023–24**
Lebanon (7)	11	Nejmeh	**2004**, **2005**, **2006**, **2007**, 2010, **2014**, 2015, 2017, 2019, 2022, 2023–24
Lebanon (7)	8	Al Ansar	2007, 2008, 2011, 2013, 2018, 2020, 2021, 2022
Lebanon (7)	6	Safa	**2008**, **2009**, 2012, 2013, **2014**, 2017
Lebanon (7)	2	Tripoli	**2004**, 2016
Lebanon (7)	1	Al Mabarra	2009
Lebanon (7)	1	Salam Zgharta	2015
Maldives (7)	9	New Radiant	**2005**, 2006, 2007, 2008, **2013**, 2014, 2015, 2016, 2018
Maldives (7)	9	Maziya	2013, 2014, 2015, 2016, 2017, 2020, 2021, 2022, 2023–24
Maldives (7)	5	VB Sports Club	2004, 2009, 2010, 2011, 2012
Maldives (7)	4	Victory SC	2007, 2008, 2010, 2011
Maldives (7)	3	Club Valencia	2004, 2005, 2009
Maldives (7)	1	Hurriyya	2006
Maldives (7)	1	TC Sports Club	2020
Palestine (7)	3	Hilal Al-Quds	2019, 2020, 2022
Palestine (7)	1	Taraji Wadi Al-Nes	2015
Palestine (7)	1	Ahli Al-Khaleel	2016
Palestine (7)	1	Shabab Al-Dhahiriya	2016
Palestine (7)	1	Markaz Balata	2021
Palestine (7)	1	Markaz Shabab Al-Am'ari	2021
Palestine (7)	1	Shabab Al-Khaleel	2022
Singapore (6)	16	Tampines Rovers	**2005**, **2006**, **2007**, **2011**, 2012, 2013, 2014, **2016**, 2017, 2018, 2019, 2020, 2022, 2024–25, **2025–26**, 2026–27
Singapore (6)	13	Lion City Sailors	**2004**, **2005**, 2006, **2008**, **2009**, **2012**, 2014, **2017**, **2018**, 2019, **2024–25**, 2025–26, 2026–27
Singapore (6)	4	Warriors	**2007**, **2008**, 2013, 2015
Singapore (6)	3	Hougang United	2020, 2022, 2023–24
Singapore (6)	2	Geylang International	**2004**, 2010
Singapore (6)	2	Balestier Khalsa	2015, 2016
Myanmar (6)	7	Yangon United	2012, **2013**, **2014**, 2016, **2018**, 2019, 2020
Myanmar (6)	4	Ayeyawady United	2012, 2013, **2015**, 2016
Myanmar (6)	4	Shan United	2018, 2019, 2020, 2023–24
Myanmar (6)	2	Yadanarbon	2015, 2017
Myanmar (6)	1	Nay Pyi Taw	**2014**
Myanmar (6)	1	Magwe	2017
Bangladesh (6)	4	Bashundhara Kings	2020, 2021, 2022, 2023–24,
Bangladesh (6)	3	Abahani Limited Dhaka	2017, 2018, **2019**
Bangladesh (6)	2	Muktijoddha Sangsad	2004, 2005
Bangladesh (6)	2	Brothers Union	2005, 2006
Bangladesh (6)	1	Dhaka Mohammedan	2006
Bangladesh (6)	1	Sheikh Jamal Dhanmondi	2016
Kuwait (5)	14	Al-Kuwait	**2009**, **2010**, **2011**, **2012**, **2013**, **2014**, **2015**, 2019, 2020, **2021**, 2022, 2023–24, 2024–25, 2026–27
Kuwait (5)	8	Al-Qadsia	**2010**, **2011**, **2012**, **2013**, **2014**, **2015**, 2019, 2020
Kuwait (5)	3	Al-Arabi	**2009**, **2022**, 2023–24
Kuwait (5)	2	Kazma	**2010**, **2012**
Kuwait (5)	1	Al Nasr	2011
Tajikistan (5)	8	Istiklol	**2015**, 2016, **2017**, 2018, 2019, 2020, 2024–25, 2025–26
Tajikistan (5)	5	Ravshan Kulob	2013, 2014, 2021, 2023–24, 2024–25
Tajikistan (5)	4	Khujand	2019, 2020, 2021, **2022**
Tajikistan (5)	1	Regar-TadAZ Tursunzoda	2013
Tajikistan (5)	1	CSKA Pamir Dushanbe	2022
Philippines (5)	6	Kaya–Iloilo	**2016**, 2019, 2020, 2022, 2024–25, 2025–26
Philippines (5)	5	Ceres–Negros	**2016**, **2017**, **2018**, **2019**, 2020
Philippines (5)	3	Global	2015, **2017**, 2018
Philippines (5)	2	DH Cebu	2023–24, 2024–25
Philippines (5)	1	Stallion Laguna	2023–24
Uzbekistan (5)	4	Nasaf	**2010**, **2011**, **2021**, 2026–27
Uzbekistan (5)	2	Neftchi Fergana	**2009**, **2012**
Uzbekistan (5)	1	Shurtan Guzar	**2011**
Uzbekistan (5)	1	Sogdiana Jizzakh	**2022**
Uzbekistan (5)	1	Andijon	2025–26
Cambodia (5)	3	Phnom Penh Crown	2022, **2023–24**, 2026–27
Cambodia (5)	2	Boeung Ket	2017, 2018
Cambodia (5)	1	PKR Svay Rieng	2020, 2026–27
Cambodia (5)	1	Nagaworld	2019
Cambodia (5)	1	Visakha	2022
Australia (5)	2	Macarthur	**2023–24, 2025–26**
Australia (5)	1	Central Coast Mariners	**2023–24**
Australia (5)	1	Sydney FC	**2024–25**
Australia (5)	1	Adelaide United	2026–27
Australia (5)	1	Melbourne Victory	2026–27
United Arab Emirates (5)	1	Shabab Al-Ahli	**2024–25**
United Arab Emirates (5)	1	Sharjah	**2024–25**
United Arab Emirates (5)	1	Al Wasl	**2025–26**
United Arab Emirates (5)	1	Al-Jazira	2026–27
United Arab Emirates (5)	1	Al Wahda	2026–27
Kyrgyzstan (4)	4	Dordoi Bishkek	2017, 2019, 2021, 2022
Kyrgyzstan (4)	4	Alay	2014, 2017, 2018, 2021
Kyrgyzstan (4)	1	Neftchi Kochkor-Ata	2022
Kyrgyzstan (4)	1	Abdysh-Ata	**2023–24**
Iran (4)	2	Sepahan	2024–25, **2025–26**
Iran (4)	1	Tractor	**2024–25**
Iran (4)	1	Esteghlal	**2025–26**
Iran (4)	1	Gol Gohar	2026–27
South Korea (4)	1	Jeonbuk Hyundai Motors	**2024–25**
South Korea (4)	1	Pohang Steelers	**2025–26**
South Korea (4)	1	FC Seoul	2026–27
South Korea (4)	1	Gangwon FC	2026–27
Chinese Taipei (3)	3	Tainan City	2021, 2022, 2023–24
Chinese Taipei (3)	2	Hang Yuan	2018, 2019
Chinese Taipei (3)	1	Taichung Futuro	**2023–24**
North Korea (3)	3	April 25	**2017**, **2018**, **2019**
North Korea (3)	1	Kigwancha	2017
North Korea (3)	1	Hwaebul	2018
Qatar (3)	2	Al-Rayyan	**2010**, 2026–27
Qatar (3)	1	Al-Wakrah	**2024–25**
Qatar (3)	1	Al Ahli	**2025–26**
Saudi Arabia (3)	2	Al-Taawoun	**2024–25**, 2026–27
Saudi Arabia (3)	1	Al-Ettifaq	**2012**
Saudi Arabia (3)	1	Al-Nassr	**2025–26**
Mongolia (3)	1	Erchim	2017
Mongolia (3)	1	Athletic 220	2021
Mongolia (3)	1	Ulaanbaatar	2022
China (3)	1	Zhejiang	2024–25
China (3)	1	Beijing Guoan	2025–26
China (3)	1	Shanghai Shenhua	2026–27
Japan (3)	1	Sanfrecce Hiroshima	**2024–25**
Japan (3)	1	Gamba Osaka	**2025–26**
Japan (3)	1	Machida Zelvia	2026–27
Laos (2)	4	Lao Toyota	2015, 2016, 2019, 2020
Laos (2)	1	Young Elephants	2022
Macau (2)	1	Benfica de Macau	2018
Macau (2)	1	Chao Pak Kei	2023–24
Nepal (1)	1	Manang Marshyangdi	2019

== Clubs ==
=== By semi-final appearances ===
Year in bold: team was finalist

Team	No.	Years
Al-Kuwait	6	**2009**, **2011**, **2012**, **2013**, 2015, 2021
(Jordan) Al-Faisaly	4	**2005**, **2006**, **2007**, 2013
(Kuwait) Al-Qadsia	4	**2010**, **2013**, **2014**, 2015
(Lebanon) Nejmeh	3	**2005**, 2006, 2007
(Iraq) Erbil	3	2011, **2012**, **2014**
(Iraq) Al-Quwa Al-Jawiya	3	**2016**, **2017**, **2018**
(Bahrain) Al-Muharraq	3	**2006**, **2008**, **2021**
(Lebanon) Al-Ahed	3	2016, **2019**, **2024**
(Jordan) Al-Wehdat	2	**2006**, 2011
(Malaysia) Johor Darul Ta'zim	2	**2015**, 2016
(Syria) Al-Wahda	2	**2004**, 2017
(Tajikistan) Istiklol	2	**2015**, **2017**
(India) Bengaluru	2	**2016**, 2017
(Jordan) Al-Jazeera	2	2018, 2019
(North Korea) April 25	2	2018, **2019**
(Uzbekistan) Nasaf	2	**2011**, **2021**
(Bahrain) Al-Riffa	2	2010, 2022
(Oman) Al-Nahda	2	2008, 2024
(Singapore) Lion City Sailors	2	2004, **2025**
(Syria) Al-Jaish	1	**2004**
(Singapore) Geylang International	1	2004
(Hong Kong) Sun Hei	1	2005
(Maldives) New Radiant	1	2005
(Jordan) Shabab Al-Ordon	1	**2007**
(India) Dempo	1	2008
(Lebanon) Safa	1	2008
(Hong Kong) South China	1	2009
(Syria) Al-Karamah	1	**2009**
(Vietnam) Becamex Bình Dương	1	2009
(Syria) Al-Ittihad	1	**2010**
(Thailand) Muangthong United	1	2010
(Saudi Arabia) Al-Ettifaq	1	2012
(Thailand) Chonburi	1	2012
(India) East Bengal	1	2013
(Hong Kong) Kitchee	1	2014
(Indonesia) Persipura Jayapura	1	2014
(Turkmenistan) Altyn Asyr	1	**2018**
(Vietnam) Hanoi	1	2019
(Hong Kong) Lee Man	1	2021
(Malaysia) Kuala Lumpur City	1	**2022**
(Oman) Al-Seeb	1	**2022**
(Uzbekistan) Sogdiana Jizzakh	1	2022
(Australia) Central Coast Mariners	1	**2024**
(Kyrgyzstan) Abdysh-Ata Kant	1	2024
(Australia) Sydney FC	1	2025
(Saudi Arabia) Al-Taawoun	1	2025
(United Arab Emirates) Sharjah	1	**2025**
(Japan) Gamba Osaka	1	**2026**
(Qatar) Al Ahli	1	2026
(Saudi Arabia) Al-Nassr	1	**2026**
(Thailand) Bangkok United	1	2026

By nation

Nation	Semi-finals	Different clubs
Kuwait	10	2
Jordan	9	4
Lebanon	7	3
Iraq	6	2
Syria	5	4
Bahrain	5	2
Hong Kong	4	4
India	4	3
Saudi Arabia	3	3
Thailand	3	3
Malaysia	3	2
Oman	3	2
Singapore	3	2
Uzbekistan	3	2
Australia	2	2
Vietnam	2	2
North Korea	2	1
Tajikistan	2	1
Indonesia	1	1
Japan	1	1
Kyrgyzstan	1	1
Maldives	1	1
Qatar	1	1
Turkmenistan	1	1
United Arab Emirates	1	1

=== Unbeaten sides ===
Three clubs have won either the AFC Cup and AFC Champions League Two unbeaten:

- (Jordan) Al-Faisaly had nine wins and three draws in 2005.
- (Iraq) Al-Quwa Al-Jawiya had seven wins and four draws in 2018.
- (Lebanon) Al-Ahed had seven wins and four draws in 2019.

=== Best debuts ===
Eight clubs managed to win the AFC Cup or AFC Champions League Two on their debut:

- (Syria) Al-Jaish (2004)
- (Jordan) Al-Faisaly (2005)
- (Jordan) Shabab Al-Ordon (2007)
- Al-Kuwait (2009)
- (Syria) Al-Ittihad (2010)
- (Oman) Al-Seeb (2022)
- (Australia) Central Coast Mariners (2023–24)
- (United Arab Emirates) Sharjah (2024–25)
- (Japan) Gamba Osaka (2025–26)

=== Biggest wins ===
- Biggest margin of victory: **10**
  - (Vietnam) Hanoi 10–0 (Cambodia) Nagaworld, group stage, 2019
- Biggest margin of victory in the group stage: **10**
  - (Vietnam) Hanoi 10–0 (Cambodia) Nagaworld, 2019
- Biggest margin of victory in the zonal semi-finals (2017 to 2023–24): **4**
  - (Jordan) Al-Jazeera 4–0 (Syria) Al-Jaish, 2019
  - (Australia) Central Coast Mariners 4–0 (Cambodia) Phnom Penh Crown, 2023–24
- Biggest margin of victory in the zonal finals (2017 to 2023–24): **4**
  - (Uzbekistan) Sogdiana Jizzakh 4–0 (Tajikistan) Khujand, 2022
  - (Oman) Al-Seeb 4–0 (Bahrain) Al-Riffa, 2022
- Biggest margin of victory in the inter-zone play-off semi-finals (2017 to 2023–24): **8**
  - (North Korea) April 25 9–1 (Singapore) Home United, 2018
- Biggest margin of victory in the inter-zone play-off finals (2017 to 2023–24): **3**
  - (Australia) Central Coast Mariners 3–0 (Kyrgyzstan) Abdysh-Ata Kant, 2023–24
- Biggest margin of victory in the round of 16: **7**
  - (Indonesia) Persipura Jayapura 9–2 (Myanmar) Yangon United, 2014
- Biggest margin of victory in the quarter-finals: **6**
  - Al-Kuwait 6–0 (Hong Kong) Kitchee, 2015
- Biggest margin of victory in the semi-finals: **6**
  - (Kuwait) Al-Qadsia 6–0 (Indonesia) Persipura Jayapura, 2014
- Biggest margin of victory in a final: **4**
  - (Bahrain) Al-Muharraq 5–1 (Lebanon) Safa, 2008
  - (Kuwait) Al-Qadsia 4–0 (Iraq) Erbil, 2014

=== Most goals in a match ===
- Most goals scored by a team in a match: **10** – (Vietnam) Hanoi 10–0 (Cambodia) Nagaworld, group stage, 2019
- Most goals scored in a single match: **11**
  - (Hong Kong) Sun Hei 7–4 (Vietnam) Hòa Phát Hà Nội, group stage, 2007
  - (Indonesia) Persipura Jayapura 9–2 (Myanmar) Yangon United, quarter-finals, 2014
  - (Malaysia) Pahang 7–4 (Myanmar) Yadanarbon, group stage, 2015
  - (Kyrgyzstan) Abdysh-Ata Kant 8–3 (Turkmenistan) Merw Mary, group stage, 2023–24
  - (Philippines) DH Cebu 2–9 (Thailand) Muangthong United, group stage, 2024–25
- Most goals scored in a final: **9** – (Bahrain) Al-Muharraq 5–4 (Lebanon) Safa, 2008 final

=== Highest scoring draws ===
- Highest scoring draw: **8** – (Thailand) Chonburi 4–4 (India) Kingfisher East Bengal, group stage, 2011

== Player ==
=== Most Valuable Player ===
Season	Player	Club
2011	(Turkmenistan) Artur Gevorkýan	(Uzbekistan) Nasaf Qarshi
2012	(Brazil) Rogerinho	Al-Kuwait
2013	(Kuwait) Bader Al-Mutawa	(Kuwait) Al-Qadsia
2014	(Kuwait) Saif Al Hashan	(Kuwait) Al-Qadsia
2015	(Malaysia) Safiq Rahim	(Malaysia) Johor Darul Ta'zim
2016	(Iraq) Hammadi Ahmed	(Iraq) Al-Quwa Al-Jawiya
2017	(Tajikistan) Manuchekhr Dzhalilov	(Tajikistan) Istiklol
2018	(Iraq) Hammadi Ahmed	(Iraq) Al-Quwa Al-Jawiya
2019	(Lebanon) Mehdi Khalil	(Lebanon) Al-Ahed
2020	Cancelled due to the COVID-19 pandemic in Asia	
2021	(Bahrain) Abdulwahab Al-Malood	(Bahrain) Al-Muharraq
2022	(Oman) Eid Al-Farsi	(Oman) Al-Seeb
2023–24	(Brazil) Mikael Doka	(Australia) Central Coast Mariners
2024–25	(United Arab Emirates) Caio Lucas	(United Arab Emirates) Sharjah
2025–26	(Tunisia) Issam Jebali	(Japan) Gamba Osaka

=== Goalscoring ===
==== Top scorers by season ====
Season	Player(s)	Club(s)	Goals
2004	(Singapore) Indra Sahdan Daud	(Singapore) Home United	7
2004	(Singapore) Egmar Goncalves	(Singapore) Home United	7
2005	(Jordan) Mo'ayyad Salim	(Jordan) Al-Faisaly	9
2006	(Jordan) Mahmoud Shelbaieh	(Jordan) Al-Wehdat	8
2007	(Jordan) Odai Al-Saify	(Jordan) Shabab Al-Ordon	5
2007	(Lebanon) Mohammed Ghaddar	(Lebanon) Nejmeh	5
2008	(Brazil) Rico	(Bahrain) Al-Muharraq	19
2009	(Nigeria) Robert Akaruye	(Bahrain) Busaiteen	8
2009	(Syria) Mohamad Hamwi	(Syria) Al-Karamah	8
2009	(Syria) Jehad Al Hussain	Al-Kuwait	8
2009	(Vietnam) Huỳnh Kesley Alves	(Vietnam) Bình Dương	8
2010	(Brazil) Afonso Alves	(Qatar) Al-Rayyan	9
2011	(Montenegro) Ivan Bošković	(Uzbekistan) Nasaf Qarshi	10
2012	(Iraq) Amjad Radhi	(Iraq) Erbil	9
2012	(Syria) Raja Rafe	(Syria) Al-Shorta	9
2013	(Tunisia) Issam Jemâa	Al-Kuwait	16
2014	(Spain) Juan Belencoso	(Hong Kong) Kitchee	11
2015	(Australia) Daniel McBreen	(Hong Kong) South China	8
2015	(North Macedonia) Riste Naumov	(Myanmar) Ayeyawady United	8
2016	(Iraq) Hammadi Ahmed	(Iraq) Al-Quwa Al-Jawiya	16
2017	(North Korea) Kim Yu-song	(North Korea) April 25	9
2018	(North Korea) An Il-bom	(North Korea) April 25	12
2019	(Spain) Bienvenido Marañón	(Philippines) Ceres–Negros	10
2020	(Spain) Bienvenido Marañón	(Philippines) Ceres–Negros	5
2021	(Uzbekistan) Khusayin Norchaev	(Uzbekistan) Nasaf Qarshi	7
2022	(Uzbekistan) Jasur Hasanov	(Uzbekistan) Sogdiana Jizzakh	5
2022	(Malaysia) Paulo Josué	(Malaysia) Kuala Lumpur City	5
2022	(Brazil) Pedro Paulo	(Vietnam) Viettel	5
2023–24	(Brazil) Marco Túlio	(Australia) Central Coast Mariners	8
2024–25	(Iran) Sardar Azmoun	(United Arab Emirates) Shabab Al Ahli	9
2025–26	(Malta) Trent Buhagiar	(Singapore) Tampines Rovers FC	8

==== All-time top scorers ====
As of 2025

Rank	Player	Goals	Years	Club(s)
1	(Spain) (Philippines) Bienvenido Marañón	35	2016–2020	(Philippines) Ceres–Negros
2	(Jordan) Mahmoud Shelbaieh	34	2006–2016	(Jordan) Al-Wehdat
3	(Bosnia and Herzegovina) (Singapore) Aleksandar Đurić	32	2004–2014	Geylang United, Singapore Armed Forces, Tampines Rovers
3	(Iraq) Amjad Radhi	32	2011–2018	(Iraq) Erbil, Al-Quwa Al-Jawiya
5	(Kuwait) Bader Al-Mutawa	30	2010–2019	(Kuwait) Al-Qadsia
5	(Brazil) Rico	30	2006–2015	(Bahrain) Al-Muharraq, Al-Riffa, Al-Hidd
7	(Maldives) Ali Ashfaq	29	2004–2020	(Maldives) Club Valencia, New Radiant, VB Sports Club, TC Sports Club
8	(Brazil) Rogerinho	28	2009–2015	Al-Kuwait
9	(Spain) (Hong Kong) Jordi Tarrés	25	2012–2019	(Hong Kong) Kitchee
10	(North Korea) Kim Yu-song	24	2017–2019	(North Korea) April 25

== Coach ==
=== Winning coaches ===
Season	Winning Coach	Club(s)
2004	(Romania) Costică Ștefănescu	(Syria) Al-Jaish
2005	(Serbia) Branko Smiljanić	(Jordan) Al-Faisaly
2006	(Iraq) Adnan Hamad	(Jordan) Al-Faisaly
2007	(Syria) Nizar Mahrous	(Jordan) Shabab Al-Ordon
2008	(Bahrain) Salman Sharida	(Bahrain) Al-Muharraq
2009	(Kuwait) Mohamad Abdulla	Al-Kuwait
2010	(Romania) Valeriu Tița	(Syria) Al-Ittihad
2011	(Ukraine) Anatoliy Demyanenko	(Uzbekistan) Nasaf Qarshi
2012	(Romania) Marin Ion	Al-Kuwait
2013	(Romania) Marin Ion	Al-Kuwait
2014	(Spain) Antonio Puche	(Kuwait) Al-Qadsia
2015	(Argentina) Mario Gómez	(Malaysia) Johor Darul Ta'zim
2016	(Iraq) Basim Qasim	(Iraq) Al-Quwa Al-Jawiya
2017	(Syria) Hussam Al Sayed	(Iraq) Al-Quwa Al-Jawiya
2018	(Iraq) Basim Qasim	(Iraq) Al-Quwa Al-Jawiya
2019	(Lebanon) Bassem Marmar	(Lebanon) Al-Ahed
2021	(Bahrain) Isa Sadoon Al-Hamdani	(Bahrain) Al-Muharraq
2022	(Oman) Rashid Jaber	(Oman) Al-Seeb
2023–24	(England) Mark Jackson	(Australia) Central Coast Mariners
2024–25	(Romania) Cosmin Olăroiu	(United Arab Emirates) Sharjah
2025–26	(Germany) Jens Wissing	(Japan) Gamba Osaka

By nation

This table lists the total number of titles won by managers of each country.

Nationality	Number of wins
Romania	5
Iraq	3
Bahrain	2
Syria	2
Argentina	1
England	1
Germany	1
Kuwait	1
Lebanon	1
Oman	1
Serbia	1
Spain	1
Ukraine	1

== Attendance ==
- Highest attendance: 62,198 – Persija Jakarta v (Singapore) Home United, 2018 Zonal semi-final second leg, 15 May 2018, at Gelora Bung Karno Stadium in Jakarta, Indonesia
- Highest attendance in the final: 58,604 – Al-Qadsia v (Syria) Al-Ittihad, 2010 final, 6 November 2010, at Jaber International Stadium in Kuwait City, Kuwait

== See also ==
- Asian Club Championship and AFC Champions League Elite records and statistics
- AFC President's Cup and AFC Challenge League records and statistics
- List of world association football records
