= List of football clubs in North Korea =

This is a list of football clubs in North Korea.

== List ==
- Amrokgang Sports Club
- April 25 Sports Club (Nampho)
- Chadongcha Sports Club (Chongjin)
- Haebangsan Sports Club
- Hwaebul Sports Club
- Jadongcha Sports Club
- Jebi Sports Club
- Kigwancha Sports Club (Sinuiju)
- Kyonggongop Sports Club
- Moranbong Sports Club
- Pyongyang City Sports Club
- Rimyongsu Sports Club
- Rodongja Sports Club
- Ryomyong Sports Club
- Ryongnamsan Sports Club
- Sobaeksu Sports Club
- South Hamgyong Sports Club
- Wolmido Sports Club
- Unpasan Sports Club
- February 8 Sports Club
- Kalmaegi Sports Club
- North Hwanghae Provincial College of Physical Education
- Ch'ilbosan Sports Club
- Maebong
- Ponghwasan Sports Club
- Taeryonggang Sports Club
- Hwangryongsan Sports Club
- Kwanmobong Sports Club
- Ryong'aksan Sports Club

== See also ==
- Association football
- Football in North Korea
- DPR Korea League
- North Korea
