= 2012 DPR Korea Football League =

Statistics of DPR Korea Football League in the 2012 season

DPR Korea Football League
- Season: 2012
- Champions: April 25
- Biggest home win: Rimyŏngsu 6–0 Hwangryongsan
- Highest scoring: Maebong 2–5 Rimyŏngsu

Statistics of DPR Korea Football League in the 2012 season:

== Overview ==
=== Group stage ===
Seventeen teams took part in the 2012 national championships; in the first stage, they were divided into two groups. Group A consisted of April 25, Sobaeksu, Man'gyŏngbong, Wangjaesan, Sŏnbong, Kyŏnggong'ŏp, Wŏlmido, and Ryongnamsan, whilst Group B was made up of Ponghwasan, Myohyangsan, Maebong, Hwangryongsan, Amrokkang, Rimyŏngsu, P'yŏngyang City, Kigwanch'a, and Taeryŏnggang. April 25 and Sŏnbong finished first and second in Group A, whilst Maebong and Rimyŏngsu finished first and second in Group B.

==== Group A ====
Pos	Team	Pld	W	D	L	GF	GA	GD	Pts	Qualification
1	April 25	7	6	1	0	14	1	+13	19	Advance to semi-finals
2	Sŏnbong	7	5	1	1	17	5	+12	16	Advance to semi-finals
3	Sobaeksu	2	0	1	1	0	2	−2	1	
4	Ryongnamsan	2	0	1	1	3	8	−5	1	
5	Man'gyŏngbong	2	0	0	2	2	4	−2	0	
6	Kyŏnggong'ŏp	2	0	0	2	0	3	−3	0	
7	Wŏlmido	2	0	0	2	0	6	−6	0	
8	Wangjaesan	2	0	0	2	0	7	−7	0	

Updated to match(es) played on 1 November 2012. Source: KCTV

Known results

? October 2012	Sŏnbong	0–1	April 25	Kim Il-sung Stadium, P'yŏngyang
	None	Report	Unknown

? October 2012	Sŏnbong	2–1	Man'gyŏngbong	Kim Il-sung Stadium, P'yŏngyang
	Unknown	Report	Unknown

? October 2012	Sŏnbong	2–0	Kyŏnggong'ŏp	Kim Il-sung Stadium, P'yŏngyang
	Unknown	Report	None

? October 2012	Sŏnbong	4–0	Wŏlmido	Kim Il-sung Stadium, P'yŏngyang
	Unknown	Report	None

? October 2012	Sŏnbong	3–3	Ryongnamsan	Kim Il-sung Stadium, P'yŏngyang
	Unknown	Report	Unknown

? October 2012	Sŏnbong	4–0	Wangjaesan	Kim Il-sung Stadium, P'yŏngyang
	Unknown	Report	None

? October 2012	Sŏnbong	2–0	Sobaeksu	Kim Il-sung Stadium, P'yŏngyang
	Unknown	Report	None

? October 2012	April 25	2–1	Man'gyŏngbong	Kim Il-sung Stadium, P'yŏngyang
	Unknown	Report	Unknown

? October 2012	April 25	1–0	Kyŏnggong'ŏp	Kim Il-sung Stadium, P'yŏngyang
	Unknown	Report	None

? October 2012	April 25	2–0	Wŏlmido	Kim Il-sung Stadium, P'yŏngyang
	Unknown	Report	None

? October 2012	April 25	5–0	Ryongnamsan	Kim Il-sung Stadium, P'yŏngyang
	Unknown	Report	None

? October 2012	April 25	3–0	Wangjaesan	Kim Il-sung Stadium, P'yŏngyang
	Unknown	Report	None

? October 2012	April 25	0–0	Sobaeksu	Kim Il-sung Stadium, P'yŏngyang
	None	Report	None

==== Group B ====
Pos	Team	Pld	W	D	L	GF	GA	GD	Pts	Qualification
1	Maebong	8	6	1	1	12	4	+8	19	Advance to semi-finals
2	Rimyŏngsu	8	6	0	2	13	6	+7	18	Advance to semi-finals
3	Amrokkang	3	3	0	0	6	0	+6	9	
4	P'yŏngyang City	2	0	1	1	1	2	−1	1	
5	Myohyangsan	2	0	0	2	2	6	−4	0	
6	Kigwancha	2	0	0	2	1	4	−3	0	
7	Taeryŏnggang	2	0	0	2	0	5	−5	0	
8	Ponghwasan	2	0	0	2	0	6	−6	0	
9	Hwangryongsan	3	0	0	3	1	13	−12	0	

Updated to match(es) played on 1 November 2012. Source: KCTV

Known results

8 October 2012	Amrokkang	3–0	Hwangryongsan	Kim Il-sung Stadium, P'yŏngyang
	Unknown	Report	None

? October 2012	Maebong	0–2	Amrokkang	Kim Il-sung Stadium, P'yŏngyang
	None	Report	Unknown

? October 2012	Maebong	0–0	P'yŏngyang City	Kim Il-sung Stadium, P'yŏngyang
	None	Report	None

? October 2012	Maebong	2–0	Kigwancha	Kim Il-sung Stadium, P'yŏngyang
	Unknown	Report	None

? October 2012	Maebong	2–0	Rimyŏngsu	Kim Il-sung Stadium, P'yŏngyang
	Unknown	Report	None

? October 2012	Maebong	2–1	Myohyangsan	Kim Il-sung Stadium, P'yŏngyang
	Unknown	Report	Unknown

? October 2012	Maebong	5–0	Ponghwasan	Kim Il-sung Stadium, P'yŏngyang
	Unknown	Report	None

? October 2012	Maebong	4–1	Hwangryongsan	Kim Il-sung Stadium, P'yŏngyang
	Unknown	Report	Unknown

? October 2012	Maebong	2–0	Taeryŏnggang	Kim Il-sung Stadium, P'yŏngyang
	Unknown	Report	None

? October 2012	Rimyŏngsu	0–1	Amrokkang	Kim Il-sung Stadium, P'yŏngyang
	None	Report	Unknown

? October 2012	Rimyŏngsu	2–1	P'yŏngyang City	Kim Il-sung Stadium, P'yŏngyang
	Unknown	Report	Unknown

? October 2012	Rimyŏngsu	2–1	Kigwancha	Kim Il-sung Stadium, P'yŏngyang
	Unknown	Report	Unknown

? October 2012	Rimyŏngsu	4–1	Myohyangsan	Kim Il-sung Stadium, P'yŏngyang
	Unknown	Report	Unknown

? October 2012	Rimyŏngsu	1–0	Ponghwasan	Kim Il-sung Stadium, P'yŏngyang
	Unknown	Report	None

? October 2012	Rimyŏngsu	6–0	Hwangryongsan	Kim Il-sung Stadium, P'yŏngyang
	Unknown	Report	None

? October 2012	Rimyŏngsu	3–0	Taeryŏnggang	Kim Il-sung Stadium, P'yŏngyang
	Unknown	Report	None

=== Semi-finals ===
The top two finishers in each group advanced to the semi-finals, with the first-placed team of each group playing the second-placed team of the other group, the two match-ups being Maebong–Sŏnbong and April 25–Rimyŏngsu. Sŏnbong and April 25 advanced to the final, after Sŏnbong defeated Maebong 1–0 on a drenched pitch in heavy rain, and April 25 won their match against Rimyŏngsu 2–1.

? October 2012

Sŏnbong	1–0	Maebong
Ri Un-chol 50'	Highlights	None

Kim Il-sung Stadium, P'yŏngyang
? October 2012

April 25	2–1	Rimyŏngsu
So Un-hyok 10'; Myong Song-chol 35'	Highlights	Jong Il-gwan 2'

Kim Il-sung Stadium, P'yŏngyang

=== Third-place match ===
The losing teams in the semi-finals played for third place. Both teams had been in the same group in the first stage of the competition, with Maebong having finished first in the group and Rimyŏngsu second; in the third place match, Rimyŏngsu handed Maebong a heavy 5–2 defeat in a match which saw Rimyŏngsu dominate from start to finish – making up for having lost 0–2 to Maebong in the group stage.

? October 2012

Maebong	2–5	Rimyŏngsu
Il Pom-yong 47'; Jong Chol-hyok 85'	Highlights	Jong Il-gwan 31'; Jong Il-gwan 39'; Pak Song-chol 76'; Jo Jong-chol 80' (pen.); Pak Song-chol 87'

Kim Il-sung Stadium, P'yŏngyang

=== Final ===
The final featured a rematch between April 25 and Sŏnbong, who had finished first and second respectively in Group A in the first stage of the competition. Like in the group stage, April 25 won by one goal.

October 2012

Sŏnbong	1–2	April 25
Song Chil-un 61'	Report	Myong Song-chol 6'; Sin Jae-hyon 45'

Kim Il-sung Stadium, P'yŏngyang
Referee: Jang Myong-ho

Sŏnbong	April 25

GK	1	(North Korea) Om Jin-ho
DF	12	(North Korea) Yu Song-gun
DF	18	(North Korea) Ri Yong-ha
DF	28	(North Korea) Kim Song-hak
DF	3	(North Korea) Song Chil-un
MF	7	(North Korea) Yun Hyok-chil
MF	17	(North Korea) Kang In-su	(substituted off) 50'
MF	6	(North Korea) Ri Un-chol
MF	8	(North Korea) Pae Myong-jin
MF	9	(North Korea) Paek Chol-jin
CF	15	(North Korea) Ho Myong-chil
Substitutes:
MF	11	(North Korea) Sin Myong-il	(substituted on) 50'
Manager:
(North Korea) O Tae-song

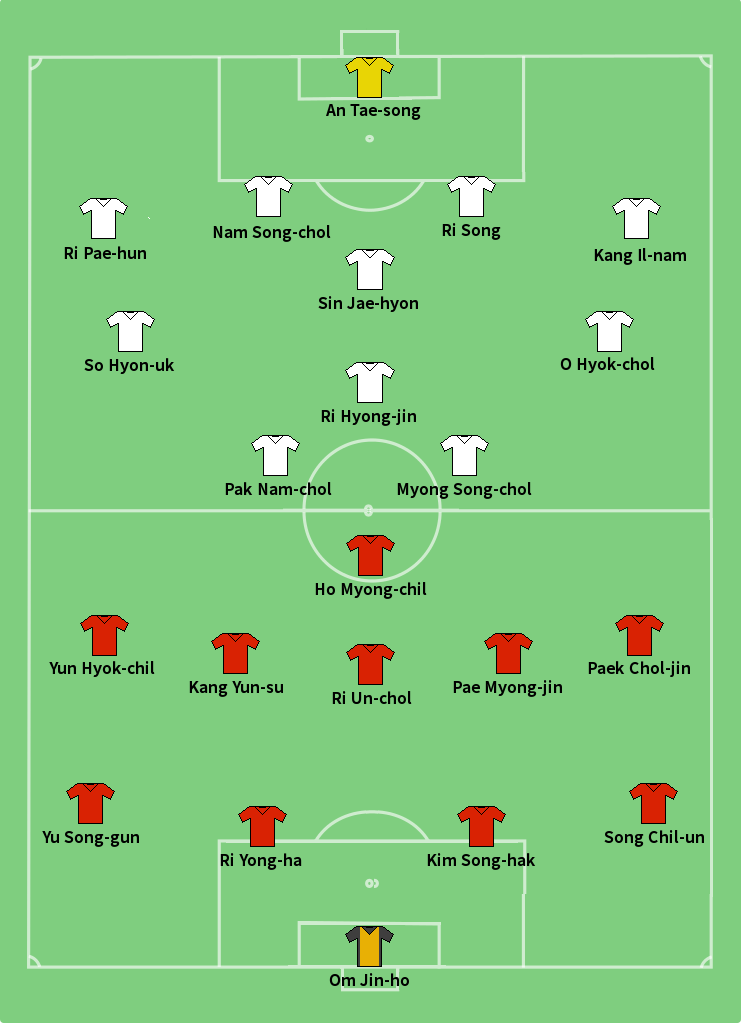

GK	21	(North Korea) An Tae-song
DF	25	(North Korea) Ri Pae-hun
DF	17	(North Korea) Nam Song-chol
DF	22	(North Korea) Ri Song
DF	19	(North Korea) Kang Il-nam
MF	15	(North Korea) Sin Jae-hyon
MF	20	(North Korea) So Hyon-uk
MF	7	(North Korea) O Hyok-chol	(yellow card) 35'
MF	6	(North Korea) Ri Hyong-jin
FW	4	(North Korea) Pak Nam-chol	(yellow card) 33'
FW	11	(North Korea) Myong Song-chol
Substitutes:
?
Manager:
(North Korea) Kim Yong-chol

Assistant referees:
Jang Chol-jin
Kim Chol-jun

== Cup competitions ==
April 25 won the Man'gyŏngdae Prize, and Rimyŏngsu won the Poch'ŏnbo Torch Prize.

Rimyŏngsu also won a Technical Innovation Contest held in P'yŏngyang in June and July, with eleven wins, one draw and two losses for 25 points, with 19 goals for; April 25 finished second, equal in points with Rimyŏngsu but with one goal less, and Kigwancha finished third with 20 points. Twelve teams took part in the competition: April 25, Rimyŏngsu, Sobaeksu, Amrokkang, Maebong, Man'gyŏngbong, Ponghwasan, Myohyangsan, P'yŏngyang City, Kigwancha, Kyŏnggong'ŏp, and Ryongnamsan.
