= 2013 DPR Korea Football League =

DPR Korea Football League
- Season: 2013
- Champions: April 25
- Relegated: Myohyangsan
- AFC President's Cup: Rimyŏngsu via the Man'gyŏngdae Prize
- Biggest home win: April 25 5–0 Myohyangsan
- Biggest away win: Myohyangsan 0–4 Kyŏnggong'ŏp
- Highest scoring: Amrokkang 6–2 Kyŏnggong'ŏp
- Longest winning run: April 25 (4 matches)
- Longest unbeaten run: April 25 (7 matches)
- Longest losing run: Myohyangsan (5 matches)

Statistics of DPR Korea Football League in the 2013 season.

== Overview ==
The Highest Class Football League was played as a single round robin in October, with ten teams taking part. April 25 won the championship, finishing with 18 points (5 wins, 3 draws, 1 loss) in the nine matches played; Man'gyŏnbong were runners-up, and Hwaebul – a new addition to the competition established in May 2013 – finished in third place.

=== Table ===
Pos	Team	Pld	W	D	L	GF	GA	GD	Pts
1	April 25 (C)	9	5	3	1	11	3	+8	18
2	Man'gyŏngbong	8	5	2	1	8	5	+3	17
3	Hwaebul	9	5	2	2	14	11	+3	17
4	Amrokkang	9	4	4	1	13	6	+7	16
?	P'yŏngyang City	9	2	5	2	10	9	+1	11
?	Kigwanch'a	8	2	4	2	10	9	+1	10
?	Rimyŏngsu	8	2	3	3	8	7	+1	9
8	Kyŏnggong'ŏp	8	1	4	3	12	17	−5	7
9	Wŏlmido	8	1	2	5	7	11	−4	5
10	Myohyangsan (R)	9	1	1	7	6	22	−16	4

Source: RSSSF. Table based on known results.
Rules for classification: 1) points; 2) head-to-head points; 3) head-to-head goal difference; 4) head-to-head goals scored; 5) goal difference; 6) number of goals scored.
(C) Champions; (R) Relegated

=== Clubs ===
Club	Location	Stadium
Amrokkang	Sinŭiju	Sinŭiju October Stadium
April 25	P'yŏngyang	Yanggakdo Stadium
Kyŏnggong'ŏp	P'yŏngyang	City Stadium
Hwaebul	P'yŏngyang	Hwaebul Stadium
Kigwanch'a	P'yŏngyang	Yanggakdo Stadium
Man'gyŏngbong	P'yŏngyang	Man'gyŏngbong Stadium
Myohyangsan		
P'yŏngyang City	P'yŏngyang	Kim Il-sung Stadium
Rimyŏngsu	Sariwŏn	Sariwŏn Youth Stadium
Wŏlmido	Kimch'aek	Kimch'aek Municipal Stadium

- Although all clubs have a home stadium, all matches of the Highest Class Football League tournament were played at Kim Il-sung Stadium in P'yŏngyang.

=== Results ===
==== Round 1 ====
2 October 2013

Man'gyŏngbong	1–0	P'yŏngyang City
Choe Nam-il 7'	Highlights

Kim Il-sung Stadium, P'yŏngyang
2 October 2013

Myohyangsan	0–4	Kyŏnggong'ŏp
	Highlights	Jon Il-yong 9'; ? ?'; ? 32'; ? ?'

Kim Il-sung Stadium, P'yŏngyang
3 October 2013

Kigwancha	1–0	Rimyŏngsu
	Report

Kim Il-sung Stadium, P'yŏngyang
4 October 2013

Hwaebul	3–0	Wŏlmido
? 6'; #15 ?'; ? ?'	Highlights

Kim Il-sung Stadium, P'yŏngyang
4 October 2013

April 25	1–0	Amrokkang
Nam Son-chol 24'	Highlights

Kim Il-sung Stadium, P'yŏngyang

==== Round 2 ====
5? October 2013

April 25	?–?	Hwaebul (won)
	Report

Kim Il-sung Stadium, P'yŏngyang
6 October 2013

Kigwancha	1–2	Myohyangsan
	Report

Kim Il-sung Stadium, P'yŏngyang
6 October 2013

Man'gyŏngbong	0–0	Kyŏnggong'ŏp
	Report

Kim Il-sung Stadium, P'yŏngyang
7 October 2013

Amrokkang	1–0	Rimyŏngsu
	Report

Kim Il-sung Stadium, P'yŏngyang
7 October 2013

P'yŏngyang City	1–0	Wŏlmido
	Report

Kim Il-sung Stadium, P'yŏngyang

==== Round 3 ====
8/9 October 2013

Man'gyŏngbong	?–?	Kigwancha
	Report

Kim Il-sung Stadium, P'yŏngyang
8/9 October 2013

Wŏlmido	?–?	Kyŏnggong'ŏp
	Report

Kim Il-sung Stadium, P'yŏngyang
9 October 2013

Amrokkang (won)	?–?	Myohyangsan
	Report

Kim Il-sung Stadium, P'yŏngyang
10 October 2013

April 25	0–0	Rimyŏngsu
	Report

Kim Il-sung Stadium, P'yŏngyang
10 October 2013

P'yŏngyang City	2–2	Hwaebul
	Report

Kim Il-sung Stadium, P'yŏngyang

==== Round 4 ====
11 October 2013

Man'gyŏnbong	0–0	Amrokkang
	Report

Kim Il-sung Stadium, P'yŏngyang
11 October 2013

Kigwancha	2–1	Wŏlmido
	Report

Kim Il-sung Stadium, P'yŏngyang
12 October 2013

April 25 (won)	?–?	P'yŏngyang City
	Report

Kim Il-sung Stadium, P'yŏngyang
13 October 2013

Myohyangsan	0–0	Rimyŏngsu
	Report

Kim Il-sung Stadium, P'yŏngyang
13 October 2013

Hwaebul	1–1	Kyŏnggong'ŏp
	Report

Kim Il-sung Stadium, P'yŏngyang

==== Round 5 ====
14 October 2013

Amrokkang	0–0	Wŏlmido
	Report

Kim Il-sung Stadium, P'yŏngyang
14/15 October 2013

Hwaebul (won)	?–?	Kigwancha
	Report

Kim Il-sung Stadium, P'yŏngyang
14/15 October 2013

Man'gyŏnbong	?–?	Rimyŏngsu
	Report

Kim Il-sung Stadium, P'yŏngyang
16 October 2013

April 25	5–0	Myohyangsan
	Report

Kim Il-sung Stadium, P'yŏngyang
16 October 2013

P'yŏngyang City	1–1	Kyŏnggong'ŏp
	Report

Kim Il-sung Stadium, P'yŏngyang

==== Round 6 ====
17 October 2013

Rimyŏngsu	1–0	Wŏlmido
	Report

Kim Il-sung Stadium, P'yŏngyang
17 October 2013

Amrokkang	2–1	Hwaebul
	Report

Kim Il-sung Stadium, P'yŏngyang
18 October 2013

Man'gyŏnbong	2–1	Myohyangsan
	Report

Kim Il-sung Stadium, P'yŏngyang
18 October 2013

Kigwancha	2–2	P'yŏngyang City
	Report

Kim Il-sung Stadium, P'yŏngyang
20 October 2013

April 25	3–1	Kyŏnggong'ŏp
	Report

Kim Il-sung Stadium, P'yŏngyang

==== Round 7 ====
20 October 2013

Hwaebul	3–2	Rimyŏngsu
	Report

Kim Il-sung Stadium, P'yŏngyang
20 October 2013

Wŏlmido	4–1	Myohyangsan
	Highlights

Kim Il-sung Stadium, P'yŏngyang
18 October 2013

Amrokkang	1–1	P'yŏngyang City
? (1–1) ?'	Highlights	Ri Chol-hyok (1–0) ?'

Kim Il-sung Stadium, P'yŏngyang
22 October 2013

April 25	1–0	Man'gyŏnbong
	Report

Kim Il-sung Stadium, P'yŏngyang
22 October 2013

Kigwancha	2–2	Kyŏnggong'ŏp
	Report

Kim Il-sung Stadium, P'yŏngyang

==== Round 8 ====
23 October 2013

Hwaebul	2–1	Myohyangsan
	Report

Kim Il-sung Stadium, P'yŏngyang
23 October 2013

Rimyŏngsu	1–1	P'yŏngyang City
	Report

Kim Il-sung Stadium, P'yŏngyang
23 October 2013

Man'gyŏnbong	2–1	Wŏlmido
Rim Pom-chol 1–0'; ? 2–1'	Highlights	Kang Hyon-su 1–1'

Kim Il-sung Stadium, P'yŏngyang
24 October 2013

Amrokkang	6–2	Kyŏnggong'ŏp
	Report

Kim Il-sung Stadium, P'yŏngyang
25 October 2013

April 25	1–1	Kigwancha
? 1–1'	Highlights	An Jun-sok 1–0'

Kim Il-sung Stadium, P'yŏngyang

==== Round 9 ====
25 October 2013

P'yŏngyang City	2–1	Myohyangsan
	Report

Kim Il-sung Stadium, P'yŏngyang
26 October 2013

Man'gyŏnbong	3–2	Hwaebul
Rim Pom-chol 1–2', 2–2'; ? 3–2'	Highlights	Kim Yong-gwang 0–1'; #15 0–2'

Kim Il-sung Stadium, P'yŏngyang
26 October 2013

Rimyŏngsu	4–1	Kyŏnggong'ŏp
	Report

Kim Il-sung Stadium, P'yŏngyang
27 October 2013

Amrokkang	1–1	Kigwancha
	Report

Kim Il-sung Stadium, P'yŏngyang
27 October 2013

April 25	1–1	Wŏlmido
Myong Song-chol 7'	Report	Sung Chol-min 32'

Kim Il-sung Stadium, P'yŏngyang

== Cup competitions ==
=== Hwaebul Cup ===
The Hwaebul Cup competition was held for the first time in 2013, with all matches played at Kim Il-sung Stadium in P'yŏngyang. The first stage was made up of two groups, with the first and second place finishers qualifying for the semi-finals. The semi-finals were held on (probably) 26 August, with Sŏnbong defeating Hwaebul, and April 25 defeating Amrokkang 3–1 on penalties, after regular time ended 2–2. The final was played on 28 August, between Sŏnbong and April 25. Regular play ended with the sides level at 2–2, and Sŏnbong won 6–5 on penalties. However, after the match, Sŏnbong was deemed to have fielded an ineligible player, and April 25 was awarded the victory.

=== Man'gyŏngdae Prize ===
The 2013 edition of the Man'gyŏngdae Prize was held in P'yŏngyang, with matches played at the Kim Il-sung Stadium and the Sosan Football Stadium from early March. Fourteen teams entered, including Kigwanch'a, Kyŏnggong'ŏp, Maebong, Rimyŏngsu, Sobaeksu, Myohyangsan, Man'gyŏnbong, P'yŏngyang City, and Amrokkang. The final, held on 29 April, saw Rimyŏngsu defeat Amrokkang by a score of 2–1. Having won the Man'gyŏngdae Prize, Rimyŏngsu were invited to take part in the 2014 AFC President's Cup – the first time a North Korean side would take part in an Asian club competition since April 25's last appearance in the 1991 Asian Club Championship.

=== Poch'ŏnbo Torch Prize ===
The fourth edition of the Poch'ŏnbo Torch Prize was played in two stages between 20 May and 10 July, the first being a double round-robin league phase, followed by a North American-style knock-out play-off phase. The top four finishers in the league phase qualified for the semi-finals. The final was played on 10 July, in which Hwaebul defeated Kyŏnggong'ŏp 2–1.

=== 60th Anniversary of the Victory in the Fatherland Liberation War ===
A one-off competition was held for the 60th anniversary of the end of the Korean War, which is referred to as the "Fatherland Liberation War" in North Korea. April 25, Hwaebul, Rimyŏngsu, and Amrokkang took part in the competition, which was won by Amrokkang.
