= So Hyon-uk =

North Korean footballer

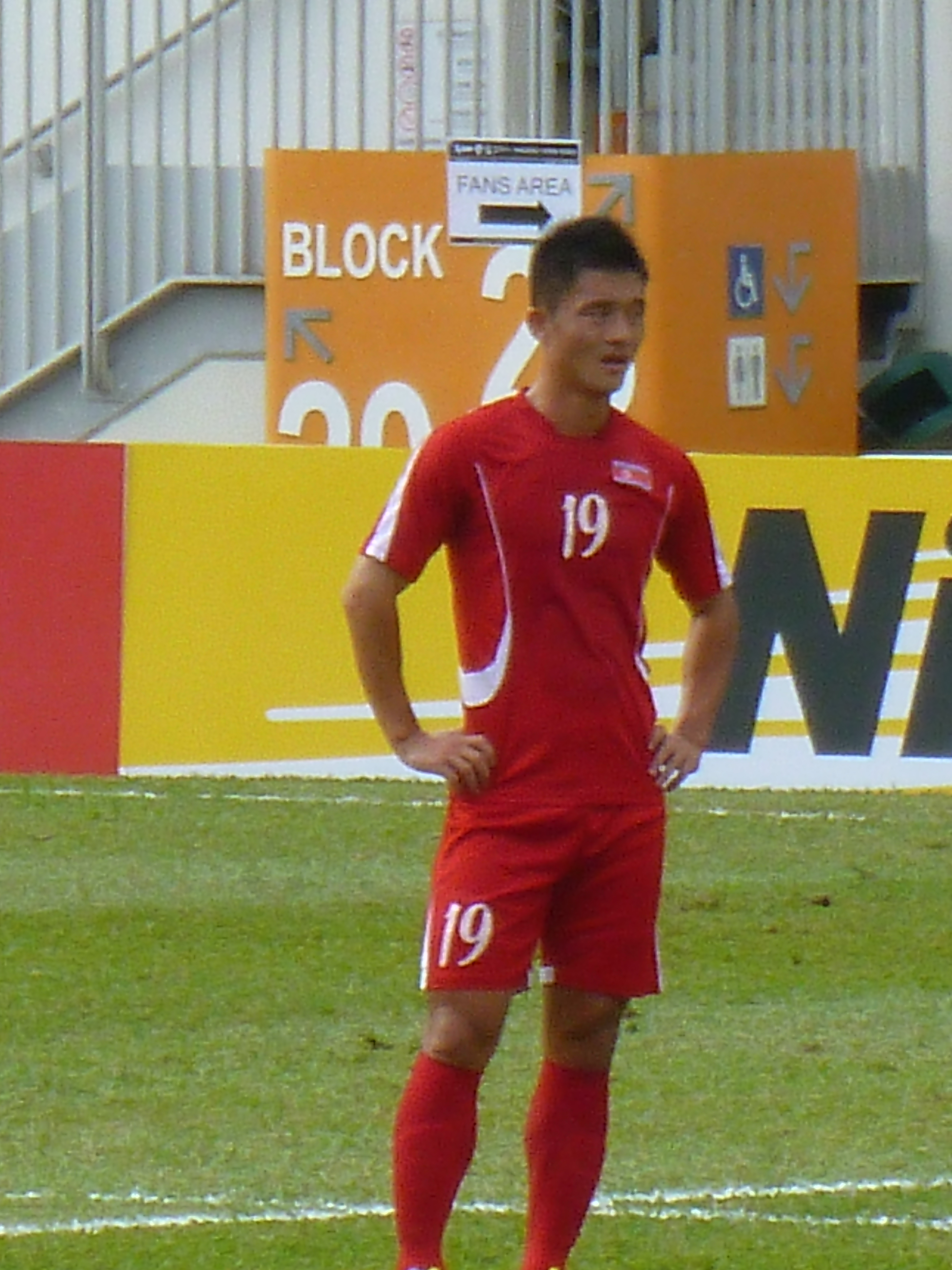

Personal information
- Date of birth: April 17, 1992 (age 34)
- Place of birth: North Korea
- Height: 1.75 m (5 ft 9 in)
- Positions: Right winger; striker

Senior career*
Years	Team	Apps	(Gls)
2012–2017	April 25		
2017–2018	Zrinjski Mostar	3	(0)
2018	→ GOŠK Gabela (loan)	14	(0)
2018	Zemun	0	(0)
2018–2019	Partizani	4	(0)

International career^{‡}
- North Korea U23
2014–	North Korea	28	(2)
- * Club domestic league appearances and goals as of 11 April 2019 ‡ National team caps and goals as of 25 August 2018

- So Hyon-uk
- Hangul: 서현욱
- RR: Seo Hyeonuk
- MR: Sŏ Hyŏnuk

So Hyon-uk (born 17 April 1992) is a North Korean international footballer who plays as a forward for the North Korea national football team.

== Club career ==
He played with April 25 Sports Club in North Korea before moving abroad in 2017 to play in Bosnia and Herzegovina first with HŠK Zrinjski Mostar and then on loan at NK GOŠK Gabela, both playing in the Premier League of Bosnia and Herzegovina. After one year in Herzegovina he left with technical staff of both clubs indicating that despite his great performances, his spell in Herzegovina was not more successful because of communication difficulties since he did not speak any English. However, his performances did not pass unnoticed in neighbouring Serbia with a top-league club, FK Zemun, signing him that summer. However, by mid August club and player agreed to mutually release him before he got a chance to debut in the league.

== International career ==
He has played for the North Korean national team since 2014. He was part of the North Korean squad at the 2015 AFC Asian Cup where they reached the final.

=== International goals ===
Scores and results list North Korea's goal tally first.

Goal	Date	Venue	Opponent	Score	Result	Competition
1.	11 June 2015	Suheim Bin Hamad Stadium, Doha, Qatar	Yemen	1–0	1–0	2018 FIFA World Cup qualification
2.	9 November 2016	Mong Kok Stadium, Mong Kok, Hong Kong	Guam	1–0	2–0	2017 EAFF E-1 Football Championship qualification

== Honours ==
=== Club ===
April 25

- DPR Korea League: 2012, 2013, 2015, 2017
- Hwaebul Cup: 2013, 2014, 2015, 2016

Zrinjski

- Premier League of Bosnia and Herzegovina: 2017–18

=== National team ===
North Korea U23

- Asian Games: 2014 (runner-up)
