= 2015 DPR Korea Football League =

DPR Korea Football League
- Season: 2015
- Champions: April 25
- Relegated: Chobyŏng

Statistics of DPR Korea Football League in the 2015 season.

== Overview ==
Twelve teams took part in the 2015 Highest Class Football League, with the tournament held as a simple round-robin tournament. The participating teams were April 25, Hwaebul, Kigwancha, Kyŏnggong'ŏp, Ponghwasan, Sobaeksu, P'yŏngyang City, Rimyŏngsu, Myohyangsan, Chobyŏng, Amrokkang, and Sŏnbong. Chobyŏng had earned promotion to the top flight for the first time after winning the second division, but they finished last in 2015 and were once again relegated.

Play began on 20 September, and the final was played in late October, with all matches played at the Rungrado 1st of May Stadium in P'yŏngyang.

The 2015 champions of the Highest Class Football League were April 25.

== Cup competitions ==
=== Hwaebul Cup ===
The final of the 2015 edition of the Hwaebul Cup was held at the Rungrado 1st of May Stadium in P'yŏngyang. April 25 defeated Kigwanch'a by a score of 5–1.

=== Man'gyŏngdae Prize ===
The 2015 edition of the Man'gyŏngdae Prize was won by April 25, who defeated Kigwanch'a in the final with a score of 1–0.

=== Osandŏk Prize ===
The first competition for the Osandŏk Prize in football was held at Rungrado 1st of May Stadium in P'yŏngyang starting on 5 December 2015. Hwaebul won the inaugural prize.

=== Poch'ŏnbo Torch Prize ===
The 2015 edition of the Poch'ŏnbo Torch Prize was won by P'yŏngyang City, who defeated Rimyŏngsu 2–1 in extra time in the final, played at Kim Il-sung Stadium in P'yŏngyang.
