= 2013 Hwaebul Cup =

Tournament details
- Country: North Korea
- Dates: 15–28 August 2013
- Teams: 11

Final positions
- Champions: April 25 (1st title)
- Runners-up: Sŏnbong
- Semifinalists: Amrokkang; Hwaebul

Tournament statistics
- Matches played: 28
- Goals scored: 95 (3.39 per match)

The 2013 Hwaebul Cup was the inaugural edition of the Hwaebul Cup (홰불, Torch) football competition celebrating North Korea's Youth Day. The competition was held between 15 and 28 August 2013, with all matches played at the Kim Il-sung Stadium in P'yŏngyang. The competition was arranged in two phases, a group stage followed by a single-elimination play-off semi-finals, and a single-game final.

== Round and dates ==
Round	Match date	Number of fixtures	Teams	New entries this round
Group stage	15–24 August 2013	25	11 → 4	11
Semi-finals	26 August 2013	2	4 → 2	none
Final	28 August 2013	1	2 → 1	none

== Group stage ==
Eleven teams took part in the group stage, drawn into two groups, with five teams in Group A and six in Group B.

=== Group A ===
Pos	Team	Pld	W	D	L	GF	GA	GD	Pts	Qualification
1	April 25	4	3	0	1	7	4	+3	9	Advance to semi-finals
2	Hwaebul	4	2	2	0	9	5	+4	8	Advance to semi-finals
3	P'yŏngyang City	4	1	2	1	8	9	−1	5	
4	Myohyangsan	4	1	0	3	5	9	−4	3	
5	Man'gyŏngbong	4	0	2	2	3	5	−2	2	

Updated to match(es) played on 23 August 2013. Source: RSSSF North Korea 2013

15 August 2013	April 25	2–0	P'yŏngyang City	Kim Il-sung Stadium, P'yŏngyang
	(1st half); (2nd half)	Highlights

15 August 2013	Hwaebul	1–1	Man'gyŏngbong	Kim Il-sung Stadium, P'yŏngyang
		Report

17 August 2013

Hwaebul	4–4	P'yŏngyang City
11' (1–0); 24' (2–1); ?' (3–3); ?' (4–4)	Highlights	1x' (1–1); 3x' (2–2); ?' (2–3); ?' (3–4)

Kim Il-sung Stadium, P'yŏngyang

17 August 2013	Myohyangsan	1–0	Man'gyŏngbong	Kim Il-sung Stadium, P'yŏngyang
		Report

19 August 2013	April 25	2–1	Man'gyŏngbong	Kim Il-sung Stadium, P'yŏngyang
		Report

19 August 2013	Hwaebul	3–0	Myohyangsan	Kim Il-sung Stadium, P'yŏngyang
		Highlights

21 August 2013

P'yŏngyang City	3–2	Myohyangsan
So Tae-jong 31', 78'; ? 53'	Highlights	#12 6x' (2–1); #14 8x' (pen.)

Kim Il-sung Stadium, P'yŏngyang

21 August 2013	Hwaebul	1–0	April 25	Kim Il-sung Stadium, P'yŏngyang
		Report

23 August 2013

April 25	3–2	Myohyangsan
? 23'; An Il-bom 1st h' (2–1); Rim Chol-min 76' (3–2)	Highlights	? 1st h' (1–1); ? 58' (2–2)

Kim Il-sung Stadium, P'yŏngyang

23 August 2013	P'yŏngyang City	1–1	Man'gyŏngbong	Kim Il-sung Stadium, P'yŏngyang
		Report

=== Group B ===
Pos	Team	Pld	W	D	L	GF	GA	GD	Pts	Qualification
1	Sŏnbong	5	4	0	1	9	3	+6	12	Advance to semi-finals (Note: Unknown why Sŏnbong were ranked first.)
2	Amrokkang	5	4	0	1	8	3	+5	12	Advance to semi-finals
3	Rimyŏngsu	5	3	1	1	11	8	+3	10	
4	Kyŏnggong'ŏp	5	2	1	2	11	9	+2	7	
5	Kigwanch'a	5	1	0	4	6	11	−5	3	
6	Wŏlmido	5	0	0	5	4	15	−11	0	

Updated to match(es) played on 23 August 2013. Source: RSSSF North Korea 2013
Notes:

16 August 2013	Rimyŏngsu	2–2	Kyŏnggong'ŏp	Kim Il-sung Stadium, P'yŏngyang
		Report

16 August 2013

Sŏnbong	2–0	Wŏlmido
Pak Myong-jin 13' (1–0); Ho Myong-chol ?' (2–0)	Highlights

Kim Il-sung Stadium, P'yŏngyang

16 August 2013	Amrokkang	1–0	Kigwanch'a	Kim Il-sung Stadium, P'yŏngyang
		Report

18 August 2013	Wŏlmido	2–4	Kyŏnggong'ŏp	Kim Il-sung Stadium, P'yŏngyang
		Report

18 August 2013

Rimyŏngsu	2–1	Amrokkang
? 11'; ? 33'	Highlights	59'

Kim Il-sung Stadium, P'yŏngyang

18 August 2013	Sŏnbong	2–0	Kigwanch'a	Kim Il-sung Stadium, P'yŏngyang
		Report

20 August 2013

Kigwanch'a	3–1	Wŏlmido
Han Tae-hyok 31'; Kim Yong-il 35'; Rim Kwang-hyok (substituted on) ?'; Rim Kwang-hyok 79'	Highlights	Ri Kum-song (substituted off) 34'; Ri Nam-jun (substituted on) 34'; Im Yong-chol 45'+1'

Kim Il-sung Stadium, P'yŏngyang

Starting 11s:

- Kigwancha: 18 Kim Il-gwang (gk); 15 Pang Tae-gun, 25 Ryu Kum-chol, 3 Kang Kuk-chol, 6 U Il-gang, 5 Ri Tong-il, 7 Kim Yong-il, 17 Choe Kwang-hyok, 11 Kim Ji-song, 9 Jang Ok-chol, 19 Han Tae-hyok; manager: Ko Jong-nam
- Wolmido: 1 Pyo Kuk-chol (gk); 11 Im Yong-chol, 4 Kang Hyon-su, 17 Rim Hyok-ju, 22 Cha Sang-chol, 15 Un Yong-il, 18 Ro Myong-il, 14 Kim Kyong-hol, 8 Ri Kum-chol, 7 Hyon Jin-hyok, 16 Ri Kum-song; manager: Pak Jong-chol
20 August 2013

Amrokkang	1–1	Kyŏnggong'ŏp
Ki Chol-min ?' (2nd half)	Highlights	? 37'

Kim Il-sung Stadium, P'yŏngyang
20 August 2013

Sŏnbong	3–1	Rimyŏngsu
Ho Myong-chol 13'; Ri Un-chol 74'; Jang Ok-il 84'	Highlights	Pak Chol-min 82'

Kim Il-sung Stadium, P'yŏngyang

Starting 11s:

- Sŏnbong: 1 Om Jin-ho (gk); 18 Ri Yong-ha, 3 Song Chol-un, 4 Rim Song, 14 Kim Song-hak, 7 Yun Hyok-chol (substituted off) , 6 Ri Un-chol, 17 Kang In-su, 8 Pae Myong-jin, 28 Paek Chol-jin, 15 Ho Myong-chol; manager: O Tae-song; (substituted on) 19 Choe Jin-hyok, (substituted on) 11 Jang Ok-il
- Rimyŏngsu: 1 Ri Chol-jin (gk); 3 Ri Myong-hak, 16 Kim Ju-hyok, 20 Ro Hak-su, 2 Jang Kwang-hyok, 9 Pak Song-chol, 12 Jo Jong-chol, 13 Yang Jun-hyok, 8 Ri Hyok, 11 Pak Chol-min, 7 Kim Kyong-il; manager: Kim Myong-song

22 August 2013	Kigwanch'a	2–3	Kyŏnggong'ŏp	Kim Il-sung Stadium, P'yŏngyang
		Report

22 August 2013	Amrokkang	1–0	Sŏnbong	Kim Il-sung Stadium, P'yŏngyang
		Report

22 August 2013	Rimyŏngsu	2–1	Wŏlmido	Kim Il-sung Stadium, P'yŏngyang
		Report

24 August 2013

Sŏnbong	2–1	Kyŏnggong'ŏp
Ho Myong-chol 51'; Kang In-su >60'	Highlights	Jon Il-yong 10'

Kim Il-sung Stadium, P'yŏngyang

24 August 2013	Amrokkang	4–0	Wŏlmido	Kim Il-sung Stadium, P'yŏngyang
		Report

24 August 2013

Kigwanch'a	1–4	Rimyŏngsu
Kim Yong-il 10' (pen.)	Highlights	Kim Kyong-il 12', 21' (pen.), 3x'; Pak Chol-min 90'+'

Kim Il-sung Stadium, P'yŏngyang

== Semi-finals ==
The semi-final matches were both held on the same day, probably 26 August 2013. The result of the Sŏnbong–Hwaebul match is unknown; in the other match, April 25 defeated Amrokkang 3–1 on penalties after finishing level at 2–2 after extra time.

26 August 2013	Sŏnbong	def	Hwaebul	Kim Il-sung Stadium, P'yŏngyang
		Report

26 August 2013	April 25	2–2 (3–1 p)	Amrokkang	Kim Il-sung Stadium, P'yŏngyang
	Unknown 1–2', 2–2'	Highlights	Unknown 1–0', 2–1'

== Final ==
The final was held on 28 August 2013 at Kim Il-sung Stadium. The score was even at 2–2 after extra time, and Sŏnbong won 6–5 on penalties. However, a few days after the match, Sŏnbong was deemed to have fielded an ineligible player, and April 25 were awarded the victory. In addition to being stripped of the title, Sŏnbong were suspended from all competitions for six months.

28 August 2013

April 25	2–2 (a.e.t.)	Sŏnbong
Myong Song-chol 66'; Ho Kwang-il 90'+2'; Ji Kwang-hyok (yellow card) 92'; #22 Ri ? (substituted off) 1xx'; An Song-il (substituted on) 1xx'	Full match	Yun Hyok-chol 47'; Rim Song-son (substituted off) 71'; Sin Myong-il (substituted on) 71'; Ho Myong-chol 76'; Kang In-su (yellow card) 89'; Yun Hyok-chol (substituted off) 92'; Ri Kwang (substituted on) 92'; Kang In-su (substituted off) 101'; Choe Jin-hyok (substituted on) 101'
Penalties
So Hyon-uk (penalty scored); #12 (penalty missed); Ji Kwang-hyok (penalty scored); #4 (penalty missed); Myong Song-chol (penalty scored); Jong Chun-song (penalty scored); Rim Chol-min (penalty scored); An Song-il (penalty missed)	5–6	Ho Myong-chol (penalty missed); Ri Un-hol (penalty scored); Song Chol-un (penalty scored); Ri Yong-ha (penalty scored); Jang Ok-il (penalty missed); Choe Jin-hyok (penalty scored); Kim Song-hak (penalty scored); Pae Myong-jin (penalty scored)

Kim Il-sung Stadium, P'yŏngyang

April 25	Sŏnbong

2013 Hwaebul Cup
April 25
1st title
