= North Korea national under-17 football team =

North Korea Under-17
- Association: DPR Korea Football Association
- Confederation: AFC (Asia)
- Head coach: Rim Chol-Min
- FIFA code: PRK
First colours	Second colours

First international
- Bahrain 3–3 North Korea (Doha, Qatar; 16 November 1986)

FIFA U-17 World Cup
- Appearances: 6 (first in 2005)
- Best result: Quarterfinals (2005)

AFC U-17 Asian Cup
- Appearances: 12 (first in 1986)
- Best result: Winners (2010, 2014)

The North Korea national under-17 football team, represents North Korea in association football at an under-17 age level and is controlled by the DPR Korea Football Association, the governing body for football in North Korea.

== Competition history ==
=== 2010 AFC Under-16 Football Championship ===
In 2010, North Korea won the AFC U-16 Championship for the first time in their history. The team's first match was a 1–1 draw to Syria on 24 October 2010 with Ri Kwang-Il scoring the goal for North Korea. North Korea then finished the group stage with a 2–0 victory over Iran and a 2–1 victory over Oman to top the group. North Korea then won the quarter-final match against Jordan on 1 November 2010 4–0. North Korea then secured their spot in the final on 4 November 2010 by defeating Japan 2–1. North Korea then defeated hosts Uzbekistan in the final on 7 November 2010 to secure their first-ever championship.

== Competition Records ==
=== FIFA U-17 World Cup ===
Hosts / Year	Result	GP	W	D	L	GS	GA
(China) 1985	Did not enter						
(Canada) 1987	Did not qualify						
(Scotland) 1989	Did not qualify						
(Italy) 1991	Did not qualify						
(Japan) 1993	Did not qualify						
(Ecuador) 1995	Did not qualify						
(Egypt) 1997	Did not qualify						
(New Zealand) 1999	Did not qualify						
(Trinidad and Tobago) 2001	Did not enter						
(Finland) 2003	Did not qualify						
(Peru) 2005	Quarter-finals	4	1	1	2	7	7
(South Korea) 2007	Round of 16	4	1	1	2	3	10
(Nigeria) 2009	Disqualified						
(Mexico) 2011	Group stage	3	0	2	1	3	5
(United Arab Emirates) 2013	Did not qualify						
(Chile) 2015	Round of 16	4	1	1	2	3	7
(India) 2017	Group stage	3	0	0	3	0	5
(Brazil) 2019	Did not qualify						
(Indonesia) 2023	Did not qualify						
(Qatar) 2025	Round of 16	5	2	2	1	9	5
(Qatar) 2026	Withdrew						
(Qatar) 2027	Disqualified						
(Qatar) 2028	To be determined						
(Qatar) 2029	To be determined						
Total:6/24	Quarter-finals	23	5	7	11	25	39

Year	Round	Score	Result
2005	Round 1	North Korea 2–3 United States	Loss
2005	Round 1	North Korea 3–0 Ivory Coast	Win
2005	Round 1	North Korea 1–1 Italy	Draw
2005	Quarterfinals	North Korea 1–3 Brazil	Loss
2007	Round 1	North Korea 1–1 England	Draw
2007	Round 1	North Korea 1–6 Brazil	Loss
2007	Round 1	North Korea 1–0 New Zealand	Win
2007	Round of 16	North Korea 0–3 Spain	Loss
2011	Round 1	North Korea 1–3 Mexico	Loss
2011	Round 1	North Korea 1–1 Netherlands	Draw
2011	Round 1	North Korea 1–1 Congo	Draw
2015	Round 1	North Korea 0–2 Russia	Loss
2015	Round 1	North Korea 1–1 South Africa	Draw
2015	Round 1	North Korea 2–1 Costa Rica	Win
2015	Round of 16	North Korea 0–3 Mali	Loss
2017	Round 1	North Korea 0–1 Niger	Loss
2017	Round 1	North Korea 0–2 Brazil	Loss
2017	Round 1	North Korea 0–2 Spain	Loss

=== AFC U-17 Asian Cup ===
Hosts / Year	Result	GP	W	D	L	GS	GA
(Qatar) 1985	Did not enter						
(Qatar) 1986	Fourth place	5	0	3	2	4	7
(Thailand) 1988	Round 1	4	0	1	3	4	10
(United Arab Emirates) 1990	Did not qualify						
(Saudi Arabia) 1992	Fourth place	5	2	1	2	7	4
(Qatar) 1994	Did not qualify						
(Thailand) 1996	Did not qualify						
(Qatar) 1998	Round 1	4	2	0	2	5	6
(Vietnam) 2000	Did not enter						
(United Arab Emirates) 2002	Did not qualify						
(Japan) 2004	Runners-up	6	2	2	2	6	4
(Singapore) 2006	Runners-up	5	3	0	2	14	9
(Uzbekistan) 2008	Disqualified						
(Uzbekistan) 2010	Champions	6	5	1	0	13	3
(Iran) 2012	Round 1	3	1	0	2	2	7
(Thailand) 2014	Champions	6	3	2	1	12	6
(India) 2016	Semifinals	5	2	2	1	9	6
(Malaysia) 2018	Quarterfinals	4	2	2	0	7	4
(Thailand) 2023	Did not enter						
(Saudi Arabia) 2025	Semifinals	5	2	2	1	12	6
(Saudi Arabia) 2026	Withdrew						
(Uzbekistan) 2027	Disqualified						
(Saudi Arabia) 2028	To be determined						
(Saudi Arabia) 2029	To be determined						
Total:12/21	2 Titles	58	24	16	18	95	72

== Current squad ==
The following 21 players were selected to compete in the 2025 FIFA U-17 World Cup.

Head coach: (North Korea) Rim Chol-min

No.	Pos.	Player	Date of birth (age)	Club
1	GK	Jong Hyon-ju	9 March 2008 (age 18)	(DPR Korea Football Association) April 25
18	GK	Kim Jong-hun	19 May 2008 (age 18)	(DPR Korea Football Association) Rimyongsu
21	GK	Min Chol-gyong	3 June 2008 (age 18)	(DPR Korea Football Association) Hwaebul
3	DF	Choe Chung-hyok	30 January 2008 (age 18)	(DPR Korea Football Association) April 25
4	DF	Pak Ki-ryong	24 May 2008 (age 18)	(DPR Korea Football Association) Rimyongsu
12	DF	Pak Ryong-u	16 November 2008 (age 17)	(DPR Korea Football Association) Wolmido
15	DF	Kim Se-ung	1 July 2008 (age 18)	(DPR Korea Football Association) Ryomyong
17	DF	Ri Kyong-bong	30 April 2008 (age 18)	(DPR Korea Football Association) April 25
20	DF	Ri Kang-song	22 February 2008 (age 18)	(DPR Korea Football Association) April 25
2	MF	Han Il-bok	30 August 2008 (age 18)	(DPR Korea Football Association) Kigwancha
5	MF	Kang Myong-bom	17 March 2008 (age 18)	(DPR Korea Football Association) Ryomyong
6	MF	An Jin-sok	29 October 2008 (age 17)	(DPR Korea Football Association) Ryomyong
7	MF	Ri Hyok-gwang	21 September 2008 (age 18)	(DPR Korea Football Association) Ryomyong
8	MF	Ri Ro-gwon	18 July 2009 (age 17)	(DPR Korea Football Association) Ryomyong
9	MF	Pak Kwang-song	9 March 2008 (age 18)	(DPR Korea Football Association) April 25
13	MF	Ri Tae-myong	8 October 2008 (age 18)	(DPR Korea Football Association) April 25
14	MF	Kim Tae-guk	20 January 2009 (age 17)	(DPR Korea Football Association) April 25
16	MF	So Jin-song	30 March 2008 (age 18)	(DPR Korea Football Association) Sobaeksu
10	FW	Kim Yu-jin	2 April 2008 (age 18)	(DPR Korea Football Association) April 25
11	FW	Ri Kang-rim	22 March 2008 (age 18)	(DPR Korea Football Association) Ryomyong
19	FW	Pak Ju-won	5 February 2009 (age 17)	(DPR Korea Football Association) Pyongyang International Football School

=== Recent call-ups ===
No.	Pos.	Player	Date of birth (age)	Club
	GK	Jon Yong-un	18 November 2009 (age 16)	(DPR Korea Football Association) April 25
	DF	Choe Song-hun	27 May 2008 (age 18)	(DPR Korea Football Association) April 25
	DF	Oh Won-mu	7 June 2009 (age 17)	(DPR Korea Football Association) Sobaeksu
	DF	Yu Kuk-thae	27 January 2008 (age 18)	(DPR Korea Football Association) April 25
	MF	Kwak Tong-myong	30 January 2009 (age 17)	(DPR Korea Football Association) Pyongyang International Football School
	MF	Paek Jin-gwang	5 January 2009 (age 17)	(DPR Korea Football Association) Pyongyang International Football School
	FW	Han Chung-guk	17 February 2009 (age 17)	(DPR Korea Football Association) Pyongyang City Football School

== Head-to-head record ==
The following table shows North Korea's head-to-head record in the FIFA U-17 World Cup and AFC U-17 Asian Cup.

=== In FIFA U-17 World Cup ===
Opponent	Pld	W	D	L	GF	GA	GD	Win %
Brazil	3	0	0	3	2	11	−9	0.00
Colombia	1	0	0	1	0	2	−2	0.00
Congo	1	0	1	0	1	1	+0	0.00
Costa Rica	1	1	0	0	2	1	+1	100.00
El Salvador	1	1	0	0	5	0	+5	100.00
England	1	0	1	0	1	1	+0	0.00
Germany	1	0	1	0	1	1	+0	0.00
Italy	1	0	1	0	1	1	+0	0.00
Ivory Coast	1	1	0	0	3	0	+3	100.00
Japan	1	0	1	0	1	1	+0	0.00
Mali	1	0	0	1	0	3	−3	0.00
Mexico	1	0	0	1	1	3	−2	0.00
Netherlands	1	0	1	0	1	1	+0	0.00
New Zealand	1	1	0	0	1	0	+1	100.00
Niger	1	0	0	1	0	1	−1	0.00
Russia	1	0	0	1	0	2	−2	0.00
South Africa	1	0	1	0	1	1	+0	0.00
Spain	2	0	0	2	0	5	−5	0.00
United States	1	0	0	1	2	3	−1	0.00
Venezuela	1	1	0	0	2	1	+1	100.00
Total	23	5	7	11	25	39	−14	21.74

=== In AFC U-17 Asian Cup ===
Opponent	Pld	W	D	L	GF	GA	GD	Win %
Australia	1	0	1	0	1	1	+0	0.00
Bahrain	2	1	1	0	5	3	+2	50.00
Bangladesh	1	1	0	0	3	0	+3	100.00
China	4	1	1	2	5	6	−1	25.00
Indonesia	1	1	0	0	6	0	+6	100.00
Iran	5	2	3	0	5	2	+3	40.00
Iraq	2	0	0	2	0	7	−7	0.00
Japan	5	1	1	3	6	11	−5	20.00
Jordan	2	1	1	0	6	2	+4	50.00
Kuwait	1	1	0	0	3	0	+3	100.00
Myanmar	2	1	1	0	7	3	+4	50.00
Nepal	1	1	0	0	4	1	+3	100.00
Oman	4	2	2	0	8	5	+3	50.00
Qatar	5	0	1	4	3	7	−4	0.00
Saudi Arabia	5	1	1	3	4	7	−3	20.00
South Korea	4	2	1	1	3	4	−1	50.00
Syria	1	0	1	0	1	1	+0	0.00
Tajikistan	3	2	1	0	7	1	+6	66.67
Thailand	3	3	0	0	10	2	+8	100.00
Uzbekistan	4	1	0	3	5	9	−4	25.00
Yemen	2	2	0	0	3	0	+3	100.00
Total	58	24	16	18	95	72	+23	41.38
