= 2014 DPR Korea Football League =

DPR Korea Football League
- Season: 2014
- Champions: Hwaebul
- Relegated: Ryong'aksan

Statistics of DPR Korea Football League in the 2014 season.

== Overview ==
The 2014 edition of the Highest Class Football League championship was played as a single round robin; twelve teams took part, each playing eleven games. Hwaebul won the championships, having had 7 wins, 3 draws and 1 loss. April 25 were the runners-up, and Amrokkang finished third. The three teams that finished in the top three spots had been considered the favourites before the start of the competition; Sŏnbong, Wŏlmido, and Kwanmobong had not been expected to do well, but each scored surprising upset victories over stronger opponents.

=== Table (partial results) ===
Pos	Team	Pld	W	D	L	GF	GA	GD	Pts
1	Hwaebul (C)	11	7	3	1	–	–	—	24 (Note: Table based on known results.)
2	April 25	4	2	1	1	6	2	+4	7
3	Amrokkang	3	1	1	1	4	4	0	4
4	Kigwanch'a	5	2	2	1	4	3	+1	8
5	Rimyŏngsu	2	2	0	0	7	4	+3	6
6	Sŏnbong	2	2	0	0	4	1	+3	6
7	Wŏlmido	3	1	1	1	4	3	+1	4
8	Kwanmobong	6	1	1	4	3	11	−8	4
9	Sobaeksu	2	1	0	1	1	1	0	3
10	Ponghwasan	1	0	1	0	2	2	0	1
11	P'yŏngyang City	1	0	0	1	3	5	−2	0
12	Ryong'aksan (R)	3	0	2	1	3	4	−1	2

Source: RSSSF
Rules for classification: 1) points; 2) head-to-head points; 3) head-to-head goal difference; 4) head-to-head goals scored; 5) goal difference; 6) number of goals scored.
(C) Champions; (R) Relegated

=== Clubs ===
Club	Location	Stadium
Amrokkang	P'yŏngyang	Yanggakdo Stadium
April 25	Namp'o	Namp'o Stadium
Hwaebul	P'yŏngyang	Hwaebul Stadium
Kigwanch'a	Sinŭiju	Sinŭiju Stadium
Kwanmobong		
Ponghwasan		
P'yŏngyang City	P'yŏngyang	Kim Il-sung Stadium
Rimyŏngsu	Sariwŏn	Sariwŏn Youth Stadium
Ryong'aksan		
Sŏnbong	Rasŏn	Rajin Stadium
Sobaeksu	P'yŏngyang	Yanggakdo Stadium
Wŏlmido	Kimch'aek	Kimch'aek Municipal Stadium

== Cup competitions ==
=== Man'gyŏngdae Prize ===
The 2014 edition of the Man'gyŏngdae Prize was played as a single round-robin tournament, followed by a single-elimination play-off stage. The final was held on 14 May 2014, and April 25 defeated Amrokkang 1–0. Kigwancha defeated Sobaeksu 1–0 in the third place match.

=== Poch'ŏnbo Torch Prize ===
The 2014 tournament for the Poch'ŏnbo Torch Prize was played in two stages, the first being a double round-robin league phase, followed by a single-elimination play-off phase. The top four finishers in the league phase qualified for the semi-finals. The final was played on 28 August, in which April 25 defeated the defending champion Hwaebul by a score of 1–0.
