= 2017 DPR Korea Football League =

DPR Korea Football League
- Season: 2017
- Champions: April 25 (17th title)
- 2018 AFC Cup: April 25, Hwaebul

Statistics of DPR Korea Football League in the 2017 season.

== Overview ==
2017 was the last season in which the Highest Class Football League was played; April 25 became national champions, and Hwaebul were runners-up.

== Cup competitions ==
=== Hwaebul Cup ===
The 2017 instalment of the Hwaebul Cup was the first time that April 25 was not the winner. In the final played on 28 August, Sobaeksu defeated Ryŏmyŏng 2–1 in extra time to win the cup for the first time. Hwaebul finished third, and Kigwanch'a finished fourth.

=== Man'gyŏngdae Prize ===
April 25 won the 2017 edition of the Man'gyŏngdae Prize after defeating February 8 in the final by a score of 2–0, whilst Hwaebul secured third place with a 1–0 victory over Sŏnbong in the bronze medal match.

=== Paektusan Prize ===
The 2017 edition of the Paektusan Prize was won by April 25. February 8 were runners up, and Hwaebul finished in third place, out of fifteen participating teams – two more than in the previous year. Sobaeksu striker Cho Kwang led the tournament in scoring, with seven goals.

=== Poch'ŏnbo Torch Prize ===
Hwaebul won the 2017 edition of the Poch'ŏnbo Torch Prize defeating Sobaeksu by a score of 2–1 in a match played at Kim Il-sung Stadium in P'yŏngyang.

== Representatives at AFC club competitions ==
The following teams would represent North Korea in the 2018 AFC Cup

- April 25
- Hwaebul
