= 2014 Hwaebul Cup =

Tournament details
- Country: North Korea
- Dates: 10–28 August 2014
- Teams: 13

Final positions
- Champions: April 25 (2nd title)
- Runners-up: Hwaebul
- Semifinalists: Sobaeksu; P'yŏngyang City

The 2014 Hwaebul Cup was the second edition of the Hwaebul Cup (홰불, Torch) celebrating North Korea's Youth Day. The competition was held from 10 to 28 August 2013, with all matches played at the Yanggakdo Stadium in P'yŏngyang. The competition was arranged in two phases, a group stage followed by a single-elimination play-off semi-finals, and a single-game final.

== Group stage ==
Thirteen teams took part in the group stage, with seven in Group A and six in Group B.

=== Group A ===
Group A was made up of Hwaebul, Kyŏnggong'ŏp, Kwanmobong, Wŏlmido, April 25, Amrokkang, and Ryong'aksan. The group stage opened with a match between Hwaebul and Kyŏnggong'ŏp on 10 August. Hwaebul, considered heavy favourites at the start of the tournament, won with a convincing 3–0 score, going on to win their next three matches against Kwanmobong (5–0), Wŏlmido and April 25 (1–0). April 25 had started out the competition by winning their first four matches, 4–1 against Amrokkang, 3–1 against Kyŏnggong'ŏp, 3–0 against Ryong'aksan, and 3–0 against Kwanmobong. Ryong'aksan had started off with a 3–2 win over Kwanmobong, whilst Wŏlmido and Amrokkang drew 1–1 in their opening match. Hwaebul and April 25 went on to advance to the semi-finals.

Table based on known results.

Pos	Team	Pld	W	D	L	GF	GA	GD	Pts	Qualification
1	Hwaebul	5	5	0	0	11	1	+10	15	Advance to semi-finals
2	April 25	6	5	0	1	18	4	+14	15	Advance to semi-finals
3	Amrokkang	4	1	1	2	9	7	+2	4	
4	Wŏlmido	4	1	1	2	5	8	−3	4	
5	Ryong'aksan	2	1	0	1	3	5	−2	3	
6	Kyŏnggong'ŏp	3	0	0	3	3	9	−6	0	
7	Kwanmobong	4	0	0	4	2	17	−15	0	

Updated to match(es) played on 28 August 2014. Source: See matches

==== Known results ====
10 August 2014	Hwaebul	3–0	Kyŏnggong'ŏp	Yanggakdo Stadium, P'yŏngyang
		Report

? August 2014	Kwanmobong	0–5	Hwaebul	Yanggakdo Stadium, P'yŏngyang
		Highlights

? August 2014	Hwaebul	def	Wŏlmido	Yanggakdo Stadium, P'yŏngyang
		Report

? August 2014	April 25	0–1	Hwaebul	Yanggakdo Stadium, P'yŏngyang
		Highlights

? August 2014	Kwanmobong	0–6	Amrokkang	Yanggakdo Stadium, P'yŏngyang
		Highlights

? August 2014	April 25	5–1	Wŏlmido	Yanggakdo Stadium, P'yŏngyang
		Highlights

? August 2014	Hwaebul	2–1	Amrokkang	Yanggakdo Stadium, P'yŏngyang
		Highlights

? August 2014	April 25	4–1	Amrokkang	Yanggakdo Stadium, P'yŏngyang
		Highlights

? August 2014	Kyŏnggong'ŏp	2–3	Wŏlmido	Yanggakdo Stadium, P'yŏngyang
		Highlights

? August 2014	Kyŏnggong'ŏp	1–3	April 25	Yanggakdo Stadium, P'yŏngyang
		Report

? August 2014	Kwanmobong	0–3	April 25	Yanggakdo Stadium, P'yŏngyang
		Report

? August 2014	Kwanmobong	2–3	Ryong'aksan	Yanggakdo Stadium, P'yŏngyang
		Report

? August 2014	April 25	3–0	Ryong'aksan	Yanggakdo Stadium, P'yŏngyang
		Report

=== Group B ===
Group B included Sobaeksu, P'yŏngyang City, Myohyangsan, Ponghwasan, Rimyŏngsu, and one other club. Rimyŏngsu had been tipped as favourites, but the opening match of the group, that they played against Sobaeksu, surprised observers with a 3–2 result in favour of Sobaeksu on 15 August. The group was topped by Sobaeksu and P'yŏngyang City, both of which had had two wins and two draws in their first four matches.

Table based on known results.

Pos	Team	Pld	W	D	L	GF	GA	GD	Pts	Qualification
1	Sobaeksu	5	3	2	0	8	2	+6	11	Advance to semi-finals
2	P'yŏngyang City	5	2	2	1	3	2	+1	8	Advance to semi-finals
3	Rimyŏngsu	3	1	1	1	4	3	+1	4	
4	Myohyangsan	2	0	1	1	0	1	−1	1	
5	Ponghwasan	2	0	0	2	0	7	−7	0	
6	?	0	0	0	0	0	0	0	0	

Updated to match(es) played on 28 August 2014. Source: See matches

==== Known results ====
15 August 2014	Rimyŏngsu	2–3	Sobaeksu	Yanggakdo Stadium, P'yŏngyang
		Highlights

? August 2014	Sobaeksu	1–0	Myohyangsan	Yanggakdo Stadium, P'yŏngyang
		Highlights

? August 2014	P'yŏngyang City	0–2	Rimyŏngsu	Yanggakdo Stadium, P'yŏngyang
		Highlights

? August 2014	Sobaeksu	4–0	Ponghwasan	Yanggakdo Stadium, P'yŏngyang
		Highlights

? August 2014	Rimyŏngsu	0–0	Myohyangsan	Yanggakdo Stadium, P'yŏngyang
		Highlights

? August 2014	P'yŏngyang City	3–0	Ponghwasan	Yanggakdo Stadium, P'yŏngyang
		Highlights

== Semi-finals ==
Hwaebul and April 25 qualified for the semi-finals from Group A, and Sobaeksu and P'yŏngyang City from Group B; the first-place finisher of each group played the second-place team from the other group. April 25 and Hwaebul won their matches to advance to the final.

26 August 2014	April 25	1–0	Sobaeksu	Yanggakdo Stadium, P'yŏngyang
		Highlights

26 August 2014	P'yŏngyang City	0–2	Hwaebul	Yanggakdo Stadium, P'yŏngyang
		Highlights

== Final ==
Hwaebul and April 25 advanced to the final, which was played at Yanggakdo Stadium on 28 August, with April 25 emerging victorious with a 1–0 score.

28 August 2014	April 25	1–0	Hwaebul	Yanggakdo Stadium, P'yŏngyang
		Highlights

April 25	Hwaebul

2014 Hwaebul Cup
April 25
2nd title
