= 2016 Hwaebul Cup =

Tournament details
- Country: North Korea
- Dates: 27 July – 28 August
- Teams: 13

Final positions
- Champions: April 25 (4th title)
- Runners-up: Hwaebul
- Semifinalists: Kyŏnggong'ŏp; Sobaeksu

Tournament statistics
- Matches played: 40
- Goals scored: 140 (3.5 per match)

The 2016 Hwaebul Cup was the fourth edition of the Hwaebul Cup (홰불, Torch) football competition celebrating North Korea's Youth Day. The competition was held between 27 July and 28 August 2016, with all matches played at the Sŏsan Stadium in P'yŏngyang. The competition was arranged in two phases. A group stage was followed by a single-elimination play-off semi-finals, and a single-game final. April 25 won the title for the fourth straight time.

== Round and dates ==
| Round | Match date | Number of fixtures | Teams | New entries this round |
|---|---|---|---|---|
| Group stage | 27 July – 24 August 2016 | 36 | 13 → 4 | 13 |
| Semi-finals | ? August 2016 | 2 | 4 → 2 | none |
| Final | 28 August 2016 | 1 | 2 → 1 | none |

== Group stage ==
Thirteen teams took part in the group stage: : Amrokkang, April 25, Chebi, February 8, Hwaebul, Kyŏnggong'ŏp, Myohyangsan, Rimyŏngsu, Ryong'aksan, Ryongnamsan, Sobaeksu, Sŏnbong, and Wŏlmido. The teams drawn into two groups, with six teams in Group A and seven in Group B; February 8 and Ryongaksan were in Group B.

Matches began on 27 July 2016, with Sobaeksu, Sŏnbong, Amrokkang and Ryong'aksan each starting their campaigns with wins; Sobaeksu started off by winning their first two matches, Hwaebul, Rimyŏngsu, April 25, and Kyŏnggong'ŏp each started off with a win and a draw.

=== Group A ===
Table based on known results. The first- and second-placed teams advanced to the semi-finals. Hwaebul won the group, and Sobaeksu finished second.

| Pos | Team | Pld | W | D | L | GF | GA | GD | Pts |
|---|---|---|---|---|---|---|---|---|---|
| 1 | Hwaebul (A) | 2 | 1 | 1 | 0 | ? | ? | — | 4 |
| 2 | Sobaeksu (A) | 3 | 3 | 0 | 0 | 3 | 1 | +2 | 9 |
| ? | Rimyŏngsu | 2 | 1 | 1 | 0 | ? | ? | — | 4 |
| ? | Myohyangsan | 1 | 1 | 0 | 0 | 2 | 0 | +2 | 3 |
| ? | Amrokkang | 2 | 1 | 0 | 1 | 1 | 3 | −2 | 3 |
| ? | Ryongnamsan | 1 | 0 | 0 | 1 | 0 | 2 | −2 | 0 |

Source: naenara.com.kp
Rules for classification: 1) points; 2) goal difference; 3) number of goals scored.
(A) Advance to a further round

==== Known results ====
| 27 July 2016 | Sobaeksu | ? | Unknown | Sŏsan Stadium, P'yŏngyang |
| | | Report |

| 27 July 2016 | Amrokkang | ? | Unknown | Sŏsan Stadium, P'yŏngyang |
| | | Report |

| 27 July 2016 | Hwaebul | ? | Unknown | Sŏsan Stadium, P'yŏngyang |
| | | Report |

| July 2016 | Hwaebul | draw | Rimyŏngsu | Sŏsan Stadium, P'yŏngyang |
| | | Report |

| 17 August 2016 | Sobaeksu | 3–1 | Amrokkang | Sŏsan Stadium, P'yŏngyang |
| | 1–0 1h'; 2–0 1h' (pen.); 3–0 2h' | Highlights | 3–1 2h' |

Despite the heavy rain, Sobaeksu dominated Amrokkang right from the start, going up 1–0 early, then extending their lead to 2–0 shortly before the half on a penalty. After the restart, Sobaeksu added another goal to make it 3–0, but Amrokkang spoiled the clean sheet with a late goal, finishing the match at 3–1.

| 23 August 2016 | Myohyangsan | 2–0 | Ryongnamsan | Sŏsan Stadium, P'yŏngyang |
| | Jong Chol-min 10'; Ri Hyon-song 30' | Report | None. |

This was one of the last of the group stage matches. Myohyangsan opened the scoring in the tenth minute, with a long cross from number 14 on the left side to centre, where Jong Chol-min headed the ball into the net. They kept the pressure up, making numerous fast attacks. Ryongnamsan managed several attacks as well; towards the half-hour mark, Myohyangsan took advantage of Ryongnamsan's all-men-up posture, with number 10 seizing the ball in midfield to start a quick counterattack. He delivered a long pass to the rushing Ri Hyon-song, who dummied the last defender as well as the goaltender and shot the ball into the undefended net to extend his side's lead to 2–0 on the 30th minute. The second half, however, belonged entirely to Ryongnamsan in terms of ball possession and shots on net, but were unable to convert any of their chances, and the match ended 2–0 in favour of Myohyangsan.

=== Group B ===
Table based on known results. Sŏnbong started out strong, winning their first two matches, but eventually slowed down, with April 25 and Kyŏnggong'ŏp finishing first and second and advancing to the semi-finals.

| Pos | Team | Pld | W | D | L | GF | GA | GD | Pts |
|---|---|---|---|---|---|---|---|---|---|
| 1 | April 25 (A) | 3 | 2 | 1 | 0 | 2 | 0 | +2 | 7 |
| 2 | Kyŏnggong'ŏp (A) | 4 | 2 | 2 | 0 | 6 | 4 | +2 | 8 |
| ? | Sonbong | 3 | 2 | 0 | 1 | 0 | 1 | −1 | 6 |
| ? | Ryong'aksan | 3 | 1 | 0 | 2 | 1 | 3 | −2 | 3 |
| ? | February 8 | 1 | 1 | 0 | 0 | 2 | 1 | +1 | 3 |
| ? | Jebi | 2 | 0 | 1 | 1 | 2 | 2 | 0 | 1 |
| ? | Wŏlmido | 1 | 0 | 0 | 1 | 2 | 3 | −1 | 0 |

Source: naenara.com.kp
Rules for classification: 1) points; 2) goal difference; 3) number of goals scored.
(A) Advance to a further round

==== Known results ====
| 27 July 2016 | Sŏnbong | ? | Unknown | Sŏsan Stadium, P'yŏngyang |
| | | Report |

| 27 July 2016 | Ryong'aksan | ? | Unknown | Sŏsan Stadium, P'yŏngyang |
| | | Report |

| 29 July 2016 | Kyŏnggong'ŏp | 3–2 | Wŏlmido | Sŏsan Stadium, P'yŏngyang |
| | | Report |

| 2 August 2016 | Kyŏnggong'ŏp | 0–0 | April 25 | Sŏsan Stadium, P'yŏngyang |
| | | Report |

April 25 began the match with an offensive stature, attempting to make quick breaks up either wing; Kyŏnggong'ŏp had set themselves up defensively, looking to take advantage of opportunities for quick counter-attacks. April 25 dominated the first half, having had possession of the ball for 80% of the opening 45 minutes, and having four corner kicks and six shots on goal, compared to Kyŏnggong'ŏp's 20% possession with only a single shot on goal and a single corner. They were, however, solid on defence, and April 25 were unable to take advantage of their superiority. Kyŏnggong'ŏp started the second half off with several bold, but fruitless attacks, but towards the end of the match April 25 was back on the offensive, though remained incapable of breaching Kyŏnggong'ŏp's defence. In the 88th minute, Kyŏnggong'ŏp advanced on a sudden counter-attack to score, but the goal was disallowed as off-side, and the match ended 0–0.

| 7 August 2016 | Kyŏnggong'ŏp | 2–2 | Jebi | Sŏsan Stadium, P'yŏngyang |
| | | Report |

| 10 August 2016 | Kyŏnggong'ŏp | 1–0 | Ryong'aksan | Sŏsan Stadium, P'yŏngyang |
| | Unknown 83' | Report |

This match was a back-and-forth affair, but neither side was able to convert any of their chances until the 83rd minute, when Kyŏnggong'ŏp managed to break the deadlock with what proved to be the decisive goal.

| 10 August 2016 | April 25 | 1–0 | Sŏnbong | Sŏsan Stadium, P'yŏngyang |
| | Rim Chol-min ?' (late 2nd half) | Report |

This meeting between two powerhouses was well-attended by spectators. Two minutes after April 25 kicked off, Sŏnbong attempted a long-range shot from the midfield with Army's keeper (Ri Kang or Kim Ch'ŏl-nam) off of his line, but the shot went wide. April 25 then took control of the midfield area, stifling Sŏnbong's attempts to attack and successfully preventing any shots against their own goal. The first half ended goalless. Sŏnbong came out to start the second half offensively, having switched to a 4-2-4 formation. Both teams pressed their attacks, but it wasn't until late in the game that a goal came. April 25 managed to break out on the wing, taking a shot from left side that was parried by Sŏnbong's keeper. However, the rebound fell to Rim Ch'ŏl-min dashing up the middle, who put the ball up under the crossbar to give April 25 a 1–0 lead. Sŏnbong attacked fiercely over the last few minutes, but they were unable to get past 4.25's keeper. The victory secured April 25's place in the semi-finals.

| 17 August 2016 | February 8 | 2–1 | Ryong'aksan | Sŏsan Stadium, P'yŏngyang |
| | No. 7 ?' (1–1, 1st half); No. 7 75' | Report | Kim Ju-song ?' (0-1, 1st half) |

Right from the start, this match was played with aggressive, attacking football. Ryong'aksan threatened early on with a two-man rush that led to a free kick just outside February 8's box; Ryong'aksan's Kim Ju-song, a free-kick specialist, converted the set piece to give his team the early lead. Ryong'aksan kept the pressure up through the first half, forcing February 8 to play defensively in the midfield. Later in the first half, 2.8 managed a counter, getting a long pass forward to striker number 7, who weaved past a defender and beat the goalie to level the score at a goal a piece; the first half ended at 1–1. February 8 continued to play a tight defensive game in the second half, looking to exploit chances to counterattack. Fifteen minutes from time, they managed to get the ball in midfield, delivering a pass forward to number 7, who scored his second of the game to give his side a 2–1 lead, and proved to be the winning goal for February 8.

== Knock-out stage ==
=== Semi-finals ===
The top two finishers in each group advanced to the semi-finals, with the first-placed team in Group A playing the second-placed team in Group B, and vice versa. Scores are not known for either match, but Hwaebul won their match against Kyŏnggong'ŏp, and April 25 won their fixture against Sobaeksu.

=== Final ===
Like all the other matches, the final was held at Sŏsan Stadium, on 28 August 2016, between April 25 and Hwaebul; the two domestic powers had each finished the group stage at the top of their respective groups. Right from the opening kickoff April 25 came out with an all-out offensive posture, and already in the 9th minute, April 25's An Il-bom scored from the right side of the box to give his team a 1–0 lead, placing the ball high into the net above Hwaebul's keeper (probably Song T'ae). The goal further energised the Army side, further intensifying their attacks. April 25 were awarded a penalty kick in the 13th minute, which An Il-bom converted to extend the lead to 2–0. Hwaebul then began concentrating on the midfield, trying to stifle 4.25 before they could get into Hwaebul's end of the pitch. These efforts paid off twenty minutes later, when Hwaebul's number 9 sent a long pass from midfield forward to striker number 22, Kim Jin-hyok, who dribbled the ball past the last defender and put it past April 25's keeper (likely Ri Kang) to cut the lead to 2–1 on the 32nd minute. There was no further scoring until the 82nd minute, when Hwaebul were awarded a penalty that was converted by Kim Jin-hyok, his second of the match, to equalise the score. After a goalless extra time, the match was decided on penalties; April 25's keeper made a save on Hwaebul's third attempt, giving his side a 3–2 win, and fourth straight Hwaebul Cup victory.

28 August 2016

| April 25 | 2-2 (a.e.t.) | Hwaebul |
|---|---|---|
| An Il-bom 9', 13' (pen.) | Report | Kim Jin-hyok 32', 82' (pen.) |
Penalties
| Penalty scored | 3–2 | Penalty scored Penalty missed |

Sŏsan Stadium, P'yŏngyang

| April 25 | Hwaebul |

2016 Hwaebul Cup
April 25
4th title
