= 2015 Hwaebul Cup =

Tournament details
- Country: North Korea
- Dates: 27 July – 28 August
- Teams: 14

Final positions
- Champions: April 25 (3rd title)
- Runners-up: Kigwancha
- Semifinalists: Kyŏnggong'ŏp; Wŏlmido

Tournament statistics
- Matches played: 50
- Goals scored: 160 (3.2 per match)

The 2015 Hwaebul Cup was the third edition of the Hwaebul Cup (홰불, Torch) celebrating North Korea's Youth Day. The competition was held from 27 July to 28 August 2013, with all matches played at the Rungrado 1st of May Stadium in P'yŏngyang. The competition was arranged in two phases, a group stage followed by a single-elimination play-off semi-finals, and a single-game final.

== Group stage ==
The fourteen teams that took part in the tournament were divided into two groups. Group A included Amrokkang, April 25, Kyŏnggong'ŏp, Myohyangsan, Sŏnbong and two other clubs, whilst Group B included Hwaebul, Kigwancha, Ponghwasan, Wŏlmido and three other clubs.

=== Group A ===
Table based on known results. The first- and second-placed teams advanced to the semi-finals. Kyŏnggong'ŏp and April 25 advanced to the semi-finals.

Pos	Team	Pld	W	D	L	GF	GA	GD	Pts	Qualification
1	Kyŏnggong'ŏp	6	4	1	1	0	0	0	13	Advance to semi-finals
2	April 25	6	3	3	0	0	0	0	12	Advance to semi-finals
3	Amrokkang	1	1	0	0	0	0	0	3	
4	Sŏnbong	1	0	0	1	0	0	0	0	
5	Myohyangsan	2	0	0	2	0	0	0	0	
6	?	0	0	0	0	0	0	0	0	
7	?	0	0	0	0	0	0	0	0	

Updated to match(es) played on 25 August 2015. Source: P'yŏngyang Times

==== Known results ====
?	Sŏnbong	1–4	Kyŏnggong'ŏp	Rungrado 1st of May Stadium, P'yŏngyang
		Report

?	April 25	7–2	Myohyangsan	Rungrado 1st of May Stadium, P'yŏngyang
		Report

=== Group B ===
Table based on known results. The first- and second-placed teams advanced to the semi-finals. Wŏlmido and Kigwancha advanced to the semi-finals.

Pos	Team	Pld	W	D	L	GF	GA	GD	Pts	Qualification
1	Wŏlmido	6	3	3	0	0	0	0	12	Advance to semi-finals
2	Kigwancha	6	3	2	1	0	0	0	11	Advance to semi-finals
3	Hwaebul	1	1	0	0	5	0	+5	3	
4	Sobaeksu	1	1	0	0	2	0	+2	3	
5	Ponghwasan	3	0	0	3	0	7	−7	0	
6	?	0	0	0	0	0	0	0	0	
7	?	0	0	0	0	0	0	0	0	

Updated to match(es) played on 25 August 2015. Source: P'yŏngyang Times

==== Known results ====
?	Hwaebul	5–0	Ponghwasan	Rungrado 1st of May Stadium, P'yŏngyang
		Report

7 August 2015	Sobaeksu	2–0	Ponghwasan	Rungrado 1st of May Stadium, P'yŏngyang
		Highlights

== Knock-out stage ==
=== Semi-finals ===
Kyŏnggong'ŏp and April 25 qualified for the semi-finals from Group A, and Wŏlmido and Kigwancha from Group B; the first-place finisher of each group played the second-place team from the other group. Kigwancha held out for a 3–2 win over Kyŏnggong'ŏp to advance to the final, whilst April 25 earned a solid 2–0 victory over Wŏlmido to earn their spot in the final.

25 August 2015	Kigwancha	3–2	Kyŏnggong'ŏp	Rungrado 1st of May Stadium, P'yŏngyang
		Report

25 August 2015	April 25	2–0	Wŏlmido	Rungrado 1st of May Stadium, P'yŏngyang
		Report

=== Third-place match ===
Kyŏnggong'ŏp defeated Wŏlmido to secure third place, but the match score is unknown.

28 August 2015	Kyŏnggong'ŏp	?	Wŏlmido	Rungrado 1st of May Stadium, P'yŏngyang
		Report

=== Final ===
Kigwancha and April 25 advanced to the final, which was played at the Rungrado 1st of May Stadium on 28 August. Kigwancha fought hard early on to try to gain the initiative and took an early 1–0 lead, but April 25 soon asserted their dominance, and overwhelmed Kigwancha to win their third straight Hwaebul Cup title with a 5–1 score.

28 August 2015	April 25	5–1	Kigwancha	Rungrado 1st of May Stadium, P'yŏngyang
		Highlights

April 25	Kigwancha

2015 Hwaebul Cup
April 25
3rd title
