= Football in North Korea =

- Country: North Korea
- Governing body: DPR Korea Football Association
- National teams: men's national team women's national team

National competitions
- DPR Korea Football League; DPR K-League 2 DPR K-League 3 DPR Korean Cup; DPR Korea Women's League; DPR Korea W-League 2

International competitions
- AFC Cup; FIFA World Cup; Asian Cup

Association football in North Korea is governed by the DPR Korea Football Association (KFA), which was established in 1945. While football is the most popular sport in the country, the state's secrecy makes it difficult to accurately determine things such as attendances and popularity for club matches. Approximately one in five people in North Korea are considered association football fans.

== Governing body ==
The KFA oversees the North Korea national football team, the North Korea women's national football team and the North Korean football league system, including the DPR Korea Football League. The body became an AFC affiliate in 1954 and a FIFA affiliate in 1958. Its chairman is Mun Jae Chol.

== Teams and competitions ==
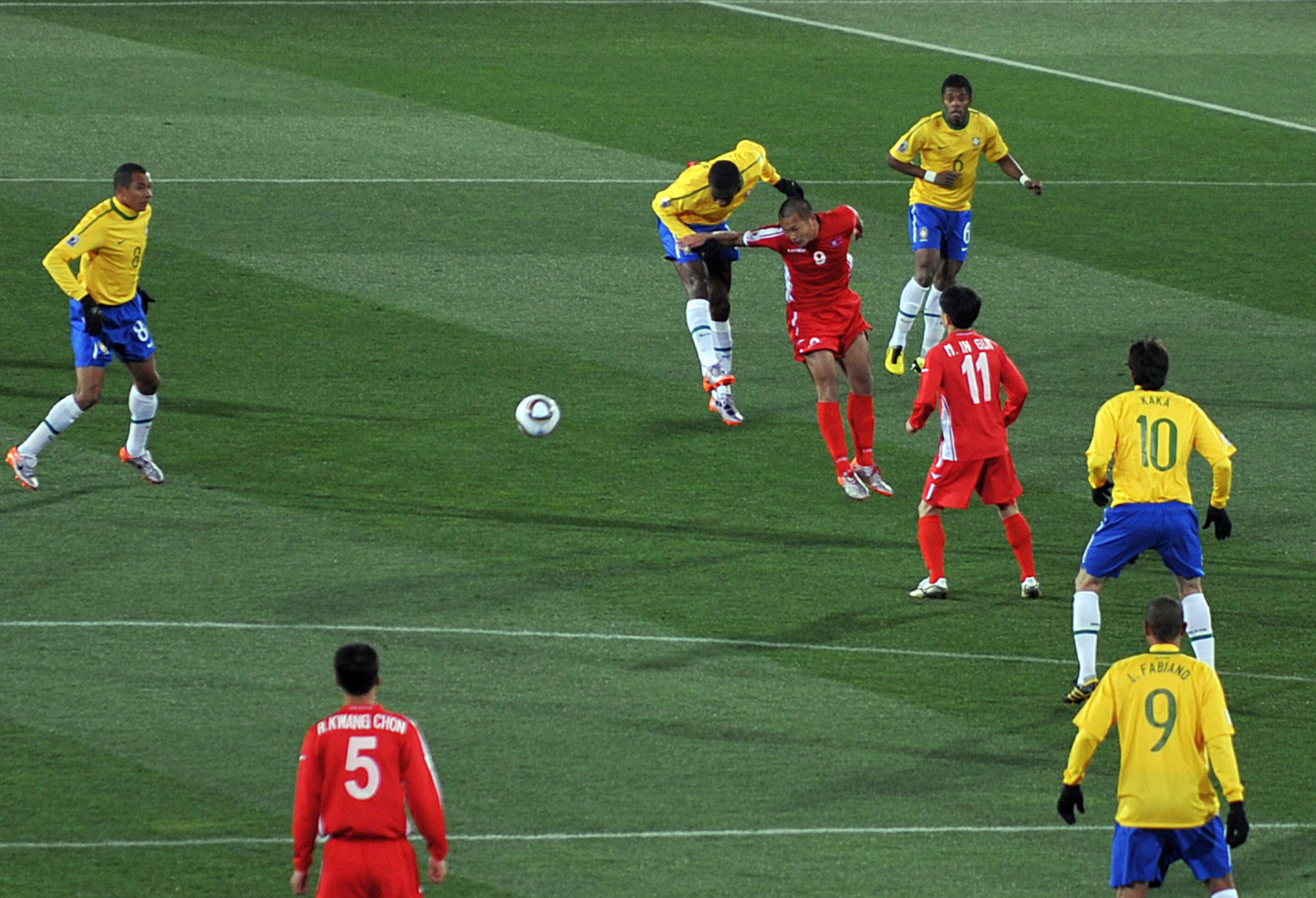
North Korea vs. Brazil at the 2010 FIFA World Cup

The DPR Korea League is the highest league in the Korean football league system. Below it comes the DPR K-League 2 and the Amateur DPR K-League 3. The DPR Korea League consists of three leagues which are played at different times of the year.

Prior to 2017, the DPR Korea League winners were not eligible for any Asian Football Confederation club competition.

Since 2017, the top 2 clubs in the DPR Korea League compete in the AFC Cup.
The main cup competition is the DPR Korean Cup, sometimes known as the Open Cup. It replaced the Republican Championship.

Other competitions held include the Man'gyŏngdae Prize, Osandŏk Prize, Paektusan Prize and the Poch'ŏnbo Torch Prize.

== National teams ==
=== Men ===
The North Korea national football team is ranked 112th in the world by the FIFA, as of November 2022. They consist of North Koreans and Chongryon-affiliated Koreans born in Japan. In 1966, the team managed to make up for a 3–0 loss to the Soviet Union in the first match of the group stages to qualify for the next round in second. In the group stage of the 1966 World Cup, North Korea surprisingly beat Italy 1–0 in the group stage to clinch the second place, thus qualifying for the quarter-finals. Whilst there, Korea DPR lost 5–3 to Portugal thanks to four goals from Eusébio, after being 3–0 up on 25 minutes. In 2010, the North Korea team failed to get past the group stages, finishing bottom of the group and losing all three matches. Subsequently, the team also failed to qualify for the 2014, 2018, 2022, or 2026 FIFA World Cup.

=== Women ===
Unlike the men's team, the women's squad consists entirely of North Korea-born Koreans. It is much more successful than its male counterpart, reaching the quarter-finals of the FIFA Women's World Cup in 2007 and winning the AFC Women's Asian Cup in 2008. They were also disqualified for the 2015 FIFA Women's World Cup, due to using illegal drugs. The team is ranked 9th in the World by the FIFA, as of December 2023.

== Youth football ==
North Korea has a distinguished record in youth football, in particularly Asia. North Korea has been a major football youth power in the continent, having won the AFC U-16 Championship twice, AFC U-19 Championship three times, and the FIFA U-17 Women's World Cup three times. It is also a frequent participant in the Asian Games, winning one gold medal, and has participated in every editions of the AFC U-23 Championship. The team also participated in the Summer Olympics.

== Largest North Korean football stadiums ==
| Stadium | Capacity | Club | City | Notes |
|---|---|---|---|---|
| Rungrado 1st of May Stadium | 114,000 | April 25 (for international club matches); National team (very rarely used) | P'yŏngyang | Third largest stadium in the world. |
| Kim Jong-Il Stadium | 50,000 | P'yŏngyang City, National team | P'yŏngyang | Largest league use stadium in North Korea. |

== See also ==
- Sport in North Korea
- North Korea national football team
- North Korea women's national football team
- DPR Korean Cup
- DPR Korea League
