= Ri Kwang-il =

North Korean footballer

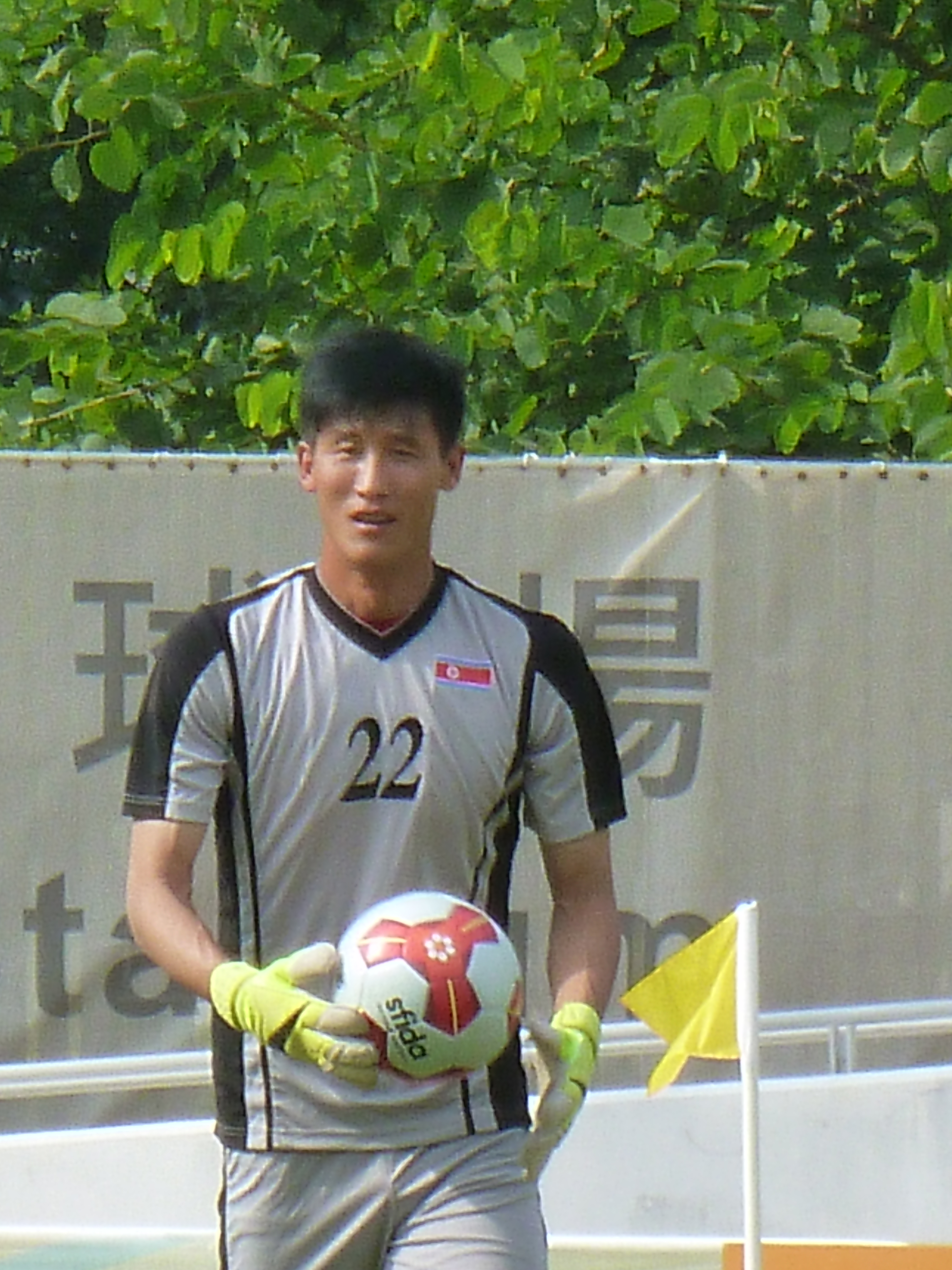
- Kwang-il with North Korea in 2016

Personal information
- Full name: Ri Kwang-il
- Date of birth: 13 April 1988 (age 38)
- Place of birth: Pyongyang, North Korea
- Height: 1.83 m (6 ft 0 in)
- Position: Goalkeeper

Team information
- Current team: Sobaeksu
- Number: 1

Senior career*
Years	Team	Apps	(Gls)
2006–2009	Sobaeksu		
2009–2010	Radnički Kragujevac	2	(0)
2010	→ Erdoglija Kragujevac (loan)		
2010–2013	Sobaeksu		
2013–2016	April 25		
2016–	Sobaeksu		

International career
2006–2007	North Korea U20		
2014–2019	North Korea	7	(0)
- * Club domestic league appearances and goals as of 10 November 2017

- Ri Kwang-il
- Hangul: 리광일
- Hanja: 李光一
- RR: Ri Gwangil
- MR: Ri Kwangil

Ri Kwang-il (Korean: 리광일, born 13 April 1988) is a North Korean footballer who plays for Sobaeksu in the DPR Korea League. He made seven appearances for the North Korea national team.

== Career ==
In summer 2009 together with other two players from Sobaeksu, An Il-bom and Myong Cha-hyon, he moved to Serbia and signed a one-year contract with FK Radnički Kragujevac. They played in one of the Serbian third levels, the Serbian League West. After playing twice in the first six months, he was dropped by Radnički coach Vlado Čapljić for the second half of the season, and he was loaned to another club from same city, FK Erdoglija Kragujevac for the last six months.

He has been a part of the North Korea national football team since 2010, and was filled in the squad at the 2011 Asian Cup as a non-used substitute. He was part of the North Korean squad at the 2013 EAFF East Asian Cup too. In 2014, he finally made his debut for the North Korean national team. He was called for the 2010 Asian Games, 2015 EAFF East Asian Cup and 2015 AFC Asian Cup.

Earlier, he was part of North Korea squad at the 2007 FIFA U-20 World Cup.

== Honours ==
Radnički Kragujevac

- Serbian League West: 2009–10

April 25

- DPR Korea Premier Football League: 2015
