= DPR Korea Women's Premier League =

- Country: North Korea
- Confederation: AFC
- Number of clubs: 12
- Level on pyramid: 1
- Relegation to: W-League D2
- International cup: AFC Women's Champions League
- Current champions: April 25 (9th title) (2024–25)

The DPR Korea Women's Premier League (Korean: 조선민주주의인민공화국 녀자 1부류축구련맹전) is the top flight of women's association football in North Korea. The competition is run by the DPR Korea Football Association, the governing body of Women's football in North Korea.

== History ==
The first known DPR Korea Women's Football Championship was held in 2002.

== Clubs Season 2025-2026 ==
Club	Location	Affiliation
Amnokgang	P'yŏngyang	Ministry of People's Security
April 25	P'yŏngyang	Korean People's Army
Hwaebul	Pochŏn	Kimilsungist-Kimjongilist Youth League
Jebi	P'yŏngyang	Korean People's Army Air Force
Kalmaegi	Wonsan	Korean People's Army Navy
Kigwancha	Sinuiju	Korean State Railway
Naegohyang	P'yŏngyang	Guard Command
Ponghwasan	Unsan County, North Pyongan Province	Organization of physical education specialty
Pyongyang City	P'yŏngyang	Workers' Party of Korea
Rimyongsu	Sariwŏn	Ministry of People's Security
Sobaeksu	P'yŏngyang	Korean People's Army
Wolmido	Kimch'aek	Ministry of Culture and Fine Arts

== Champions ==
The list of champions, runners-up and third-place teams:

Year	Champions	Runners-up	Third-place
2002	April 25	Tumangang	Rimyongsu
2003			
2004	Amnokgang		
2005	Amnokgang	April 25	Rimyongsu
2006			
2007	Rimyongsu	Amnokgang	Sobaeksu
2008			
2009	April 25	Sobaeksu	
2010	April 25	Amnokgang	Jebi
2011	April 25	Amnokgang	Rimyongsu
2012	Ponghwasan	Sobaeksu	April 25
2013	April 25	Amnokgang	Myohyangsan
2014	Pyongyang	Amnokgang	Sobaeksu
2015			
2016			
2017			
2018			
2018–19	April 25	Wolmido	Amnokgang
2019–20	abandoned		
2020–21	April 25		
2021–22	Naegohyang	April 25	Amnokgang
2022–23	April 25	Naegohyang	Wolmido
2023–24	Naegohyang	Pyongyang	Sobaeksu
2024–25	April 25	Naegohyang	Pyongyang
