= Football in Korea =

Football in Korea may refer to:

- Football in North Korea
- Football in South Korea
