= Pyongyang City =

Pyongyang City may refer to:

- Pyongyang, the capital and largest city of North Korea
- Pyongyang Sports Club
