= Football at the Osandok Prize Sports Games =

North Korean association football competition

- Organiser(s): DPR Korea Football Association
- Founded: 2015; 11 years ago
- Region: North Korea
- Most championships: Hwaebul Sports Club

Football at the Osandok Prize Sports Games is an association football competition held for professional teams in the Multi-sport events - Osandok Prize Sports Games in North Korea. It is held and overseen by the DPR Korea Football Association and was founded in 2015. Osandok is a dong in hoeryeong

== Results ==
Season	Champion	Runner-up	Third place
2015	Hwaebul	Kyŏnggong'ŏpsong	Sobaeksu
2016	Hwaebul		February 8
2017	Hwaebul		

== Performance by club ==
Club	Winners	Runners-up	Third place	Winning seasons	Runners-up seasons	Third place seasons
Hwaebul	3	—	—	2015, 2016, 2017		
Kyŏnggong'ŏpsong	—	1		—	2015	
Sobaeksu	—		1	—		2015
February 8	—		1	—		2016
