= North Hwanghae Provincial College of Physical Education =

North Hwanghae Provincial College of Physical Education (NHPCPE, Korean: 황해북도체육전문학교) is a sport college located in Sariwon, North Hwanghae Province, North Korea.

== History ==
The college was founded in 1923. The college is currently based in Sariwon.

== Sports teams ==
It has a men's football team, which competed in 2002 and 2007 DPR Korea Premier Football League seasons.

The college also has a women's football team, which competed in 2002 DPR Korea Women's Premier League season.

It is not known whether the college has sports teams other than football.
