= Football at the DPR Korea Championships =

Football knockout tournament in North Korea

- Region: North Korea

Football at the DPR Korea Championships (Chosŏn'gŭl: 공화국선수권대회 축구; Hanja: 共和國選手權大會 蹴球) is a football knockout cup competition in North Korea. The competition is a part of the multi-sport event – DPR Korea Championship. This competition is commonly known as a Republic Championship.

== History ==
The championship was launched in October, 1972. This championship was held from September through October. Initially held every autumn, after 2007 it was held only every other year.

== Champions ==
=== Men ===
- 1972–2000: unknown
- 2001: April 25 (P'yŏngyang)
- 2002–03: unknown
- 2004:Pyongyang (P'yŏngyang)
- 2005: unknown
- 2006: April 25
- 2007: Amnokgang
- 2009: Kyonggongopsong (Ministry of Light Industry) (P'yŏngyang)
- 2011: April 25
- 2013:
- 2015:
- 2017:
- 2019: Ryomyong

=== Women ===
- 2019: Naegohyang Women's FC (내고향녀자축구선수단)
