= North Korean Championship =

Ice hockey league in North Korea

- Sport: Ice hockey
- Founded: 1956
- Country: North Korea
- Most recent champion: Pyongchol Pyongyang
- Most titles: Pyongyang

The North Korean Championship (공화국선수권 빙상호케이 대회) is the national ice hockey championship in North Korea. It was first staged in 1956.

== Champions ==
- 2017: unknown
- 2016: Taesongsan
- 2015: unknown
- 2014: Champions: Taesongsan, runners-up: Jangjasan, third place: Sobaeksu
- 2013: Pyongchol Pyongyang
- 2012: unknown
- 2011: Pyongchol Pyongyang
- 2010: Pyongchol Pyongyang
- 2009: Pyongyang City
- 2008: Pyongyang City
- 2007: Pyongchol Pyongyang
- 2006: Pyongchol Pyongyang
- 2005: Pyongyang
- 2004: Pyongchol Pyongyang
- 2003: Pyongchol Pyongyang
- 2002: unknown
- 2001: Pyongchol Pyongyang
- 2000: unknown
- 1999: Susan Pyongyang
- 1998: Pyongchol Pyongyang
- 1997: Pyongchol Pyongyang
- 1996: Amrokkang
- 1995: Amrokkang
- 1994: Amrokkang
- 1993: Pyongyang City
- 1992: Pyongyang City
- 1991: Pyongyang City
- 1990: Pyongyang City
- 1989: April 25
- 1988: Pyongyang City
- 1987: Pyongyang City
- 1986: Pyongyang City
- 1985: Pyongyang City
- 1984: Amrokkang
- 1983: Amrokkang
- 1982: Amrokkang
- 1981: Amrokkang
- 1980: Pyongyang City
- 1979: Pyongyang City
- 1978: Pyongyang City
- 1977: Pyongyang City
- 1976: Pyongyang City
- 1975: Chagang (Kanggye)
- 1974: Pyongyang City
- 1973: Pyongyang City
- 1972: Pyongyang City
- 1971: Pyongyang City
- 1970: Chagang
- 1969: Pyongyang City
- 1968: Pyongyang City
- 1967: Pyongyang City
- 1966: Chagang
- 1965: Pyongyang City
- 1964: Pyongyang City
- 1963: Pyongyang City
- 1956-1962: unknown
