= Football at the Paektusan Prize Sports Games =

- Founded: 2007
- Region: North Korea
- Most championships: Rimyongsu Sports Club

The Football at the Paektusan Prize Sports Games is an annual association football men's competition in Multi-sport event - Paektusan Prize Sports Games in North Korea, organised by the DPR Korea Football Association.

== Results ==
Season	Champion	Runner-up	Third place	Final
2007	P'yŏngyang	Amnokgang	Kyŏnggong'ŏpsong	
2008	Unknown			
2009	Unknown			
2010	Rimyŏngsu			
2011	Rimyŏngsu			
2012	Amnokgang	Rimyŏngsu	Kigwancha	
2013	Unknown			
2014	Unknown			
2015			April 25	
2016	Hwaebul	Sobaeksu	P'yŏngyang	1–0 (Sŏsan Stadium)
2017	April 25	February 8	Hwaebul	1–0 (Sŏsan Stadium)

== Performance by club ==
Club	Winners	Runners-up	Third place	Winning seasons	Runners-up seasons	Third place seasons
Rimyŏngsu	2	1		2010, 2011	2012	
Amnokgang	1	1		2012	2007	
P'yŏngyang	1		1	2007		2016
Hwaebul	1		1	2016		2017
April 25	1		1	2017		2015
Sobaeksu		1			2016	
February 8		1			2017	
Kyŏnggong'ŏpsong			1			2007
Kigwancha			1			2016
