= Kimchaek Municipal Stadium =

Sports venue in Kimchaek, North Korea

- Interactive map of Kimchaek Municipal Stadium
- Location: Kimchaek, North Korea
- Coordinates: 40°41′0″N 129°11′48″E
- Capacity: 30,000

Tenant
- Wolmido Sports Club

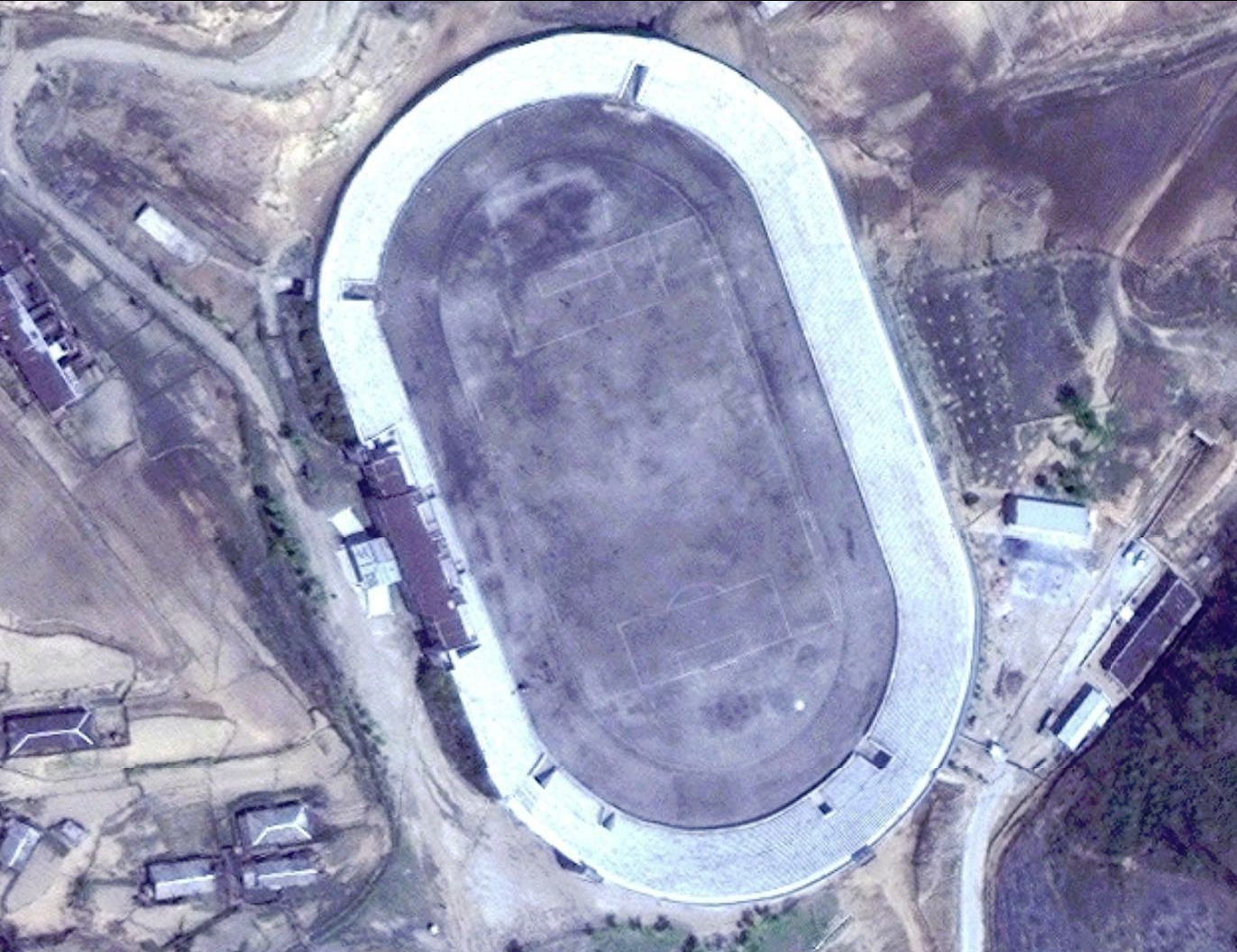
Kimchaek Stadium.jpg

Kimchaek Municipal Stadium is a multi-use stadium in Kimchaek, North Korea. It is currently used mostly for football matches and hosts the home matches of the football team of Wolmido Sports Club. The stadium holds 30,000 people.

== See also ==
- List of football stadiums in North Korea
