= Mangyongbong Sports Club =

North Korean sports club

Mangyongbong Sports Club (Korean: 만경봉체육단) is a North Korean sports club.

== Sports teams ==
The club has a men's football team, which competed in 2011 and 2013 DPR Korea Premier Football League season.

The women's football department also competed in the 2013 DPR Korea Women's Premier League season.

It is not known whether the team has sports teams other than football.

== Venue ==
Mangyongbong Stadium, which has a capacity of 2,000, is their home venue.

The club's football training facilities were upgraded in November 2013, including the installation of artificial turf meeting FIFA standards on the training pitch; when the work was completed, it was inspected by Kim Jong Un.
