= Ryongnamsan Sports Club =

Ryongnamsan 룡남산
- Full name: Ryongnamsan Sports Club 룡남산체육단
- Founded: 1900
- League: DPR Korea Football League

Ryongnamsan Sports Club (Korean: 룡남산체육단; Hancha: 龍南山體育團) is a North Korean multi-sports club based in Pyongyang and affiliated with Kim Il Sung University. They formerly competed in the DPR Korea Premier Football League.

It is named after Ryongnamsan (룡남산), a mountain in Pyongyang near Kim Il Sung University which is often equated.

== History ==
The Ryongnamsan Sports Club was founded in 1900.

== Sports teams ==
The men's football team of Ryongnamsan SC competed in the 2011 DPR Korea Premier Football League season.

The club also has handball teams.

== Notable athletes ==
- Kim Mi-rae
- Yang Kyong-il
