= Hwaebul Cup =

- Organiser(s): DPR Korea Football Association
- Founded: 2013; 13 years ago
- Region: North Korea
- Teams: 12
- International cup: AFC Challenge League
- Current champions: Amnokgang (2nd title)
- Most championships: April 25 (4 titles)
- 2022 Hwaebul Cup

The Hwaebul Cup (홰불, Torch) is an annual association football competition in men's domestic football in North Korea. It is organised by the DPR Korea Football Association, the governing body of football in North Korea. The competition is held for Youth Day, 28 August, one of North Korea's major holidays.

== Competition format ==
Beginning in July or August, the competition proceeds in two stages. The first stage consists of the teams divided into two groups playing in a single round-robin basis, with the winner and second-place team of each group advancing to the knockout stage consisting of two semi-final matches and a final, which is played on 28 August of each year.

== Venues ==
All matches are played at one stadium in Pyongyang, which varies year to year. In 2013 the matches were held at the Kim Il-sung Stadium, in 2014 at Yanggakdo Stadium, in 2015 at Rungrado 1st of May Stadium, in 2016 at Sŏsan Stadium, and in 2017 once again at Rungrado Stadium.

== List of champions ==
- 2013: April 25
- 2014: April 25
- 2015: April 25
- 2016: April 25
- 2017: Sobaeksu
- 2018: Ryomyong
- 2019: Ryomyong - Clinched 2020 AFC Cup Qualifying spot. However they didn't obtain the club licence from the Asian Football Confederation to being able to participate.
- 2022: Rimyongsu - Clinched the 2023-2024 AFC Cup Qualifying spot. However they didn't obtain the club licence from the Asian Football Confederation to being able to participate.
- 2024: April 25 - Clinched 2025–26 AFC Challenge League Qualifying Play-off spot. However they didn't obtain the club licence from the Asian Football Confederation to being able to participate.
- 2025: Amnokgang
- 2026: Amnokgang
