= February 8 Sports Club =

Multi-sports club in North Korea

- Full name: February 8 Sports Club
- Founded: 1959; 66 years ago

- February 8 Sports Club
- Chosŏn'gŭl: 2.8체육단
- Hancha: 2.8體育團
- Revised Romanization: 2.8Cheyukdan
- McCune–Reischauer: 2.8Ch'eyuktan

February 8 Sports Club (2.8체육단; Ip'al ch'eyuktan) is a North Korean professional multi-sports club.

== History ==
Being established in 1959, the club belongs to the Ministry of People's Armed Forces.

The club name originated from the Korean People's Army's (KPA) date of establishment, which was formed on 8 February 1948. (Until 1977, the original KPA's official date of establishment was 8 February 1948. However, in 1978, it was changed to 25 April 1932, due to Kim Il Sung's anti-Japanese guerilla army – the Korean People's Revolutionary Army, considered the predecessor of the KPA – being formed on 25 April 1932. This change was reverted in 2018).

== Confusion with April 25 Sports Club ==
February 8 Sports Club and April 25 Sports Club have many similarities.

In conclusion, the North Korean Ministry of People's Armed Forces operates both sports clubs separately. The 2017 editions of the Paektusan Prize and the Mangyongdae Prize were won by April 25 Sports Club, with February 8 Sports Club finishing in second place.

== Achievements ==
=== Domestic tournaments ===
- Man'gyŏngdae Prize
  - Silver medal (1): 2017
- Paektusan Prize
  - Silver medal (1): 2017

== See also ==
- April 25 Sports Club
- Military Foundation Day
