= Kyonggongopsong Sports Club =

North Korean football club

Kyŏnggongopsong Sports Club
- Ground: City Stadium, P'yŏngyang
- Manager: Jo Kum-chol
- League: DPR Korea Premier Football League
Home colours	Away colours

- Kyonggongopsong Sports Club
- Chosŏn'gŭl: 경공업성체육단
- Hancha: 輕工業省體育團
- Revised Romanization: Gyeonggongeopseong cheyukdan
- McCune–Reischauer: Kyŏnggongŏpsŏng ch'eyuktan

Kyŏnggongopsong Sports Club (Kyŏnggong'ŏpsŏng; lit. 'Ministry of Light Industry Sports Club') is a North Korean professional football club affiliated with the North Korean Ministry of Light Industry, playing in the DPR Korea Premier Football League at the 10,000 capacity City Stadium in P'yŏngyang.

== History ==
Their best known finish in the National Championships thus far is 8th, in the 2006 season, however they have had other successes, including winning the Republican Championship in 2009, having defeated Amrokkang 1–0 in the final, and a second-place finish in the 2015 edition of the Osandŏk Prize.

== Notable former players ==
- (North Korea) Choe Myong-ho, wore number 8; former Visakha FC player in the Cambodian League.

== Players ==
The following players were included in the 2025-2026 season squad.

Note: Flags indicate national team as defined under FIFA eligibility rules; some limited exceptions apply. Players may hold more than one non-FIFA nationality.

No.	Pos.	Nation	Player
1	GK	PRK	Kim Se-ung
4	DF	PRK	Ryu Il
7	MF	PRK	Kim Ki-hyok (Captain)
17	DF	PRK	Choe Kyong-il
18	FW	PRK	Kim Jin-myong
19	DF	PRK	Kim Chol-myong
21	MF	PRK	Ryang Kuk-chong
23	MF	PRK	Kim Choe-kang

No.	Pos.	Nation	Player
24	DF	PRK	Paek Song-gyong
28	MF	PRK	Choe Jin-song
29	FW	PRK	So Kuk-chol
—	MF	PRK	Pak Hyok-song
—	DF	PRK	Hong Kwon-hwi

== Managers ==
- (North Korea) Kim Yong-chol
- (North Korea) Jo Kum-chol (since 2026)

== Achievements ==
- Republican Championship: 1

(gold) 2009

- Hwaebul Cup: 2

SF 2015, 2016

- Osandŏk Prize: 1

(silver) 2015

- Paektusan Prize: 1

(bronze) 2007

- Poch'ŏnbo Torch Prize: 1

(silver) 2013
