= April 25 Sports Club =

North Korean sports club

April 25
- Full name: April 25 Sports Club
- Founded: March 1947; 79 years ago; July 1949; 77 years ago (as Central Sports Training School Sports Club)
- Stadium: Kim Il Sung Stadium, Pyongyang
- Capacity: 50,000
- Owner: Ministry of People's Armed Forces
- Chairman: Ri Mun-song
- Manager: O Hyok-chol
- League: DPR Korea Premier Football League
- 2023–24: 1st of 12 (Champions)
Home colours	Away colours

- April 25 Sports Club
- Chosŏn'gŭl: 4.25체육단
- Hancha: 4.25體育團
- Revised Romanization: Sa io cheyukdan
- McCune–Reischauer: Sa io ch'eyuktan

April 25 Sports Club (Korean: 4.25체육단, Sa io ch'eyuktan), shortly 4.25 SC, also known as April 25 National Defence Sports Club (4.25'국방체육단', Sa io "Kukpang ch'eyuktan"), is a multi-sports club based in Pyongyang, North Korea, primarily known for its men's and women's football teams. The club belongs to the Ministry of Defence; all members of the professional teams (male and female) are considered officers of the Army.

== History ==
The club was established in March 1947 or July 1949 as the Central Sports Training School Sports Club (중앙체육강습소체육단, Chung'ang ch'eyukkangsŭpso ch'eyukdan).

On 25 June 1971 or 26 June 1972, the club's name was changed to its current name; Kim Il Sung's anti-Japanese guerilla army – Joseon People's Revolutionary Army, considered the predecessor of the Korean People's Army, was formed on 25 April 1932. (Until 1977, the original KPA's official date of establishment was 8 February 1948. However, in 1978, it was changed to 25 April 1932. This change was reverted in 2018.)

The men's football team plays in the DPR Korea Premier Football League, and is the most successful club side in the country, having won 22 national championships. April 25's home stadium is the Yanggakdo Stadium. In international club competition, home matches are usually played at the Kim Il Sung Stadium. In 2015, April 25 achieved an uncommon feat, when both the men's and women's clubs won their respective national championships.

4.25 reached the final of the 2019 AFC Cup. They lost the final against Al-Ahed from Lebanon. The final took place in Kuala Lumpur. 4.25 reached the final after a goalless draw against Hanoi FC from Vietnam. The 2019 AFC Cup knockout stage game took place at the Kim Il Sung Stadium in Pyongyang in front of a crowd of 5,500. 4.25 SC usually play home games in front of thousands of spectators. The club drew an average home attendance of 4,050 in their four home games at the 2019 AFC Cup.

== Confusion with February 8 Sports Club ==
February 8 Sports Club and April 25 Sports Club have many similarities, but the North Korean Ministry of People's Armed Forces operates both sports clubs separately. The 2017 editions of the Paektusan Prize and the Mangyongdae Prize were won by April 25 Sports Club, with February 8 Sports Club finishing in second place.

== Rivalries ==
April 25's primary rival is Amnokgang. Amnokgang belongs to the Ministry of People's Security, and the professional rivalry between the Military and the Police carries over onto the sports field. There is also a strong rivalry with Pyongyang, known as "the Pyongyang Derby".

== Players ==
The following players were included in the 2025-2026 season.

Note: Flags indicate national team as defined under FIFA eligibility rules; some limited exceptions apply. Players may hold more than one non-FIFA nationality.

No.	Pos.	Nation	Player
2	MF	PRK	Ri Il-hyok
4	DF	PRK	Kim Chung-jin
5	MF	PRK	Yun Su-ung
6	FW	PRK	Kim Kwang-song
7	MF	PRK	Choe Ju-il
8	MF	PRK	Han Chung-guk
9	FW	PRK	Kim Chol-byok
10	FW	PRK	Hong Song-hyok
11	FW	PRK	Kim Yu-jin
13	DF	PRK	Cha Jin-hyok
14	FW	PRK	Ri Hyong-jin
15	MF	PRK	Pak Kwang-song
16	MF	PRK	Ri Tae-myong
17	MF	PRK	Ri Jong-chol

No.	Pos.	Nation	Player
19	FW	PRK	Choe Song-hyok (captain)
20	DF	PRK	Jo Kuk-hyon
21	MF	PRK	Min Bom-chol
22	MF	PRK	Kim Kuk-bom
23	GK	PRK	Yu Yong-bom
24	DF	PRK	Kim Jin-hyok
25	DF	PRK	Han Jin-myong
26	FW	PRK	Pak Jang-won
27	FW	PRK	Ryang Jin-sok
28	DF	PRK	Hong Il-guk
30	FW	PRK	Kim Sin-il
31	GK	PRK	Sin Tae-song

== Continental history ==
Season	Competition	Round	Club	Home	Away	Aggregate
1985–86	Asian Club Championship	Qualifying Tournament; East Asia 1	(Hong Kong) Seiko	4–1	1–2	2nd
1985–86	Asian Club Championship	Qualifying Tournament; East Asia 1	(China) Liaoning	3–1	0–0	2nd
1986	Asian Club Championship	First round group 7	(China) Liaoning	0–0	0–1	0–1
1987	Asian Club Championship	Qualifying Round; Group 5	(China) August 1	0–2		3rd
1987	Asian Club Championship	Qualifying Round; Group 5	(Macau) Hap Kuan	2–1		3rd
1988–89	Asian Club Championship	Qualifying Round; Group 6	(Hong Kong) South China	3–0		1st
1988–89	Asian Club Championship	Qualifying Round; Group 6	(Macau) Wa Seng	4–0		1st
1988–89	Asian Club Championship	Qualifying Round; Group 6	(China) Guangdong Wanbao	1–0		1st
1988–89	Asian Club Championship	Qualifying Round; Group 6	(Japan) Yamaha Motors	3–1		1st
1988–89	Asian Club Championship	Semi Final League; Group B	(Bangladesh) Mohammedan	0–1		3rd
1988–89	Asian Club Championship	Semi Final League; Group B	(Qatar) Al-Sadd	1–2		3rd
1988–89	Asian Club Championship	Semi Final League; Group B	(Saudi Arabia) Al-Ettifaq	1–1		3rd
1988–89	Asian Club Championship	Semi Final League; Group B	(Malaysia) Pahang FA	2–0		3rd
1990–91	Asian Club Championship	Qualifying Round; Group 7	(Japan) Nissan Yokohama	1–0		1st
1990–91	Asian Club Championship	Qualifying Round; Group 7	(China) Liaoning	1–0		1st
1990–91	Asian Club Championship	Group B	(Iran) Esteghlal Tehran	1–2		2nd
1990–91	Asian Club Championship	Group B	(Bangladesh) Mohammedan	0–0		2nd
1990–91	Asian Club Championship	Group B	(Thailand) Bangkok Bank	4–3		2nd
1990–91	Asian Club Championship	Semi Final	(China) Liaoning	0–3		—
1990–91	Asian Club Championship	Third Place	(Indonesia) Pelita Jaya	2–2 (6–7 pen.)		Fourth Place
1991	Asian Club Championship	Group B	(Saudi Arabia) Al-Hilal	0–2		3rd
1991	Asian Club Championship	Group B	(Iran) Esteghlal Tehran	1–1		3rd
2017	AFC Cup	Group I	(Mongolia) Erchim	6–0	5–0	1st
2017	AFC Cup	Group I	(North Korea) Kigwancha	2–2	1–1	1st
2017	AFC Cup	Inter-Zone Play-off Semi Final	(India) Bengaluru FC	0–0	0–3	0–3
2018	AFC Cup	Group I	(North Korea) Hwaebul SC	1–0	2–0	1st
2018	AFC Cup	Group I	(Chinese Taipei) Hang Yuen	5–1	5–1	1st
2018	AFC Cup	Group I	Benfica de Macau	8–0	2–0	1st
2018	AFC Cup	Inter-Zone Play-off Semi Final	(Singapore) Home United	9–1	2–0	11–1
2018	AFC Cup	Inter-Zone Play-off Final	(Turkmenistan) Altyn Asyr	2–2	1–1	3–3 (a)
2019	AFC Cup	Group I	(Chinese Taipei) Hang Yuen	5–0	0–3	1st
2019	AFC Cup	Group I	(Hong Kong) Kitchee	2–0	1–0	1st
2019	AFC Cup	Group I	(Hong Kong) Tai Po	4–0	1–3	1st
2019	AFC Cup	Inter-Zone Play-off Semi Final	(Bangladesh) Dhaka Abahani	2–0	3–4	5–4
2019	AFC Cup	Inter-Zone Play-off Final	(Vietnam) Hà Nội	0–0	2–2	2–2 (a)
2019	AFC Cup	Final	(Lebanon) Al-Ahed	0–1		

== Honours ==
=== Domestic ===
- DPR Korea Premier Football League
  - Winners (23): 1984, 1985, 1986, 1987, 1988, 1990, 1992, 1993, 1994, 1995, 2002, 2003, 2010, 2011, 2012, 2013, 2015, 2017, 2017–18, 2018–19, 2021–22, 2022–23, 2024–25
  - Runners-up (2): 2014, 2016
- Hwaebul Cup
  - Winners (4): 2013, 2014, 2015, 2016
- Man'gyŏngdae Prize
  - Winners (7): 2002, 2009, 2012, 2014, 2015, 2016, 2017
- Paektusan Prize
  - Winners (1): 2017
- Poch'ŏnbo Torch Prize
  - Winners (3): 2005, 2011, 2014
- DPR Korea Championship
  - Winners (3): 2001, 2006, 2011

=== Continental ===
- AFC Cup
  - Runners-up (1): 2019
- Asian Club Championship
  - Fourth place (1): 1990–91
  - AFC Challenge League

=== Invitational ===
- DCM Trophy
  - Winners (1): 1972

== Women's football ==
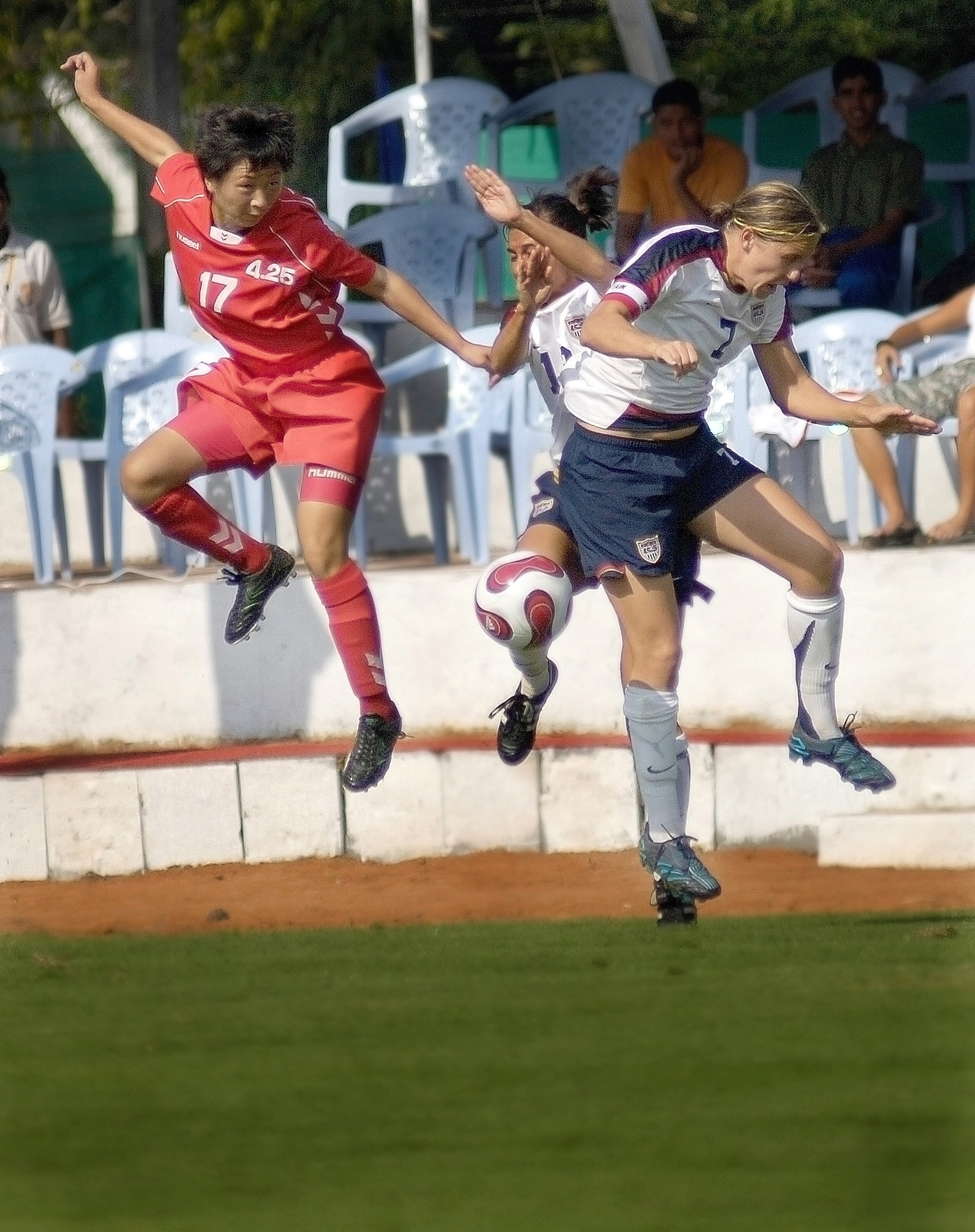
Jang Il-ok playing in April 25 Sports Club attire at the 2007 Military World Games

April 25's women's football team is one of the strongest women's football teams in North Korea; they have become national champions at least six times, in 2002, 2009, 2010, 2011, 2013, and 2015.

== Other sports ==
In addition to football, April 25 participates in dozens of different sports, including athletics, ice hockey, basketball, volleyball, and handball.

=== Basketball ===
April 25 has fielded a basketball team. In May 2013, they came to Mongolia to assist in training the Mongolian national team as preparation of the latter's campaign at the 2013 East Asian Basketball Championship.

=== Ice hockey ===
April 25's ice hockey team won the national championship in 1989.

=== Volleyball ===
April 25 has both women's and men's volleyball teams. April 25 participated at the 2015 VTV International Women's Volleyball Cup, an invitational tournament in Vietnam. The North Korean club won the bronze medal defeating Vietnamese side, VTV Bình Điền Long An. Their player, Jong Jin Sim was named Most Valuable Player of the tournament.

==== Achievements ====
- VTV Bình Điền Cup: 1
  - Champions: 2015
- VTV International Women's Volleyball Cup: 2
  - Champions: 2008

Third place: 2015

== See also ==
- February 8 Sports Club
