= Hwaebul Sports Club =

Hwaebul SC
- Full name: Hwaebul Sports Club
- Founded: 2013; 13 years ago
- Ground: Hwaebul Stadium
- Capacity: 5,000
- Owner: Kim Jong-min
- Manager: Il Mun-ho
- League: DPR Korea Premier Football League
| Home colours | Away colours |

- Hwaebul
- Chosŏn'gŭl: 홰불 체육단
- Revised Romanization: Hwaebul cheyukdan
- McCune–Reischauer: Hwaepul ch'eyuktan

Hwaebul Sports Club is a professional football club from Pochon, North Korea, founded in 2013. It is the sports club of the Kimilsungist-Kimjongilist Youth League and is based at the 5,000 capacity Hwaebul Stadium. The club plays in the DPR Korea Premier Football League.

== History ==
The team was given its name by Kim Jong-un when it was founded, in the hopes that the club would be a guiding light for football in North Korea, as "Hwaebul" means "torch" in Korean. Despite its newness, the club has already achieved considerable success, finishing third in their inaugural season, winning the Highest Class Football League in the second season, along with securing several wins in the Paektusan Prize, the Poch'ŏnbo Torch Prize, and other competitions.

The club made its competitive debut in the 2013 competition of the Poch'ŏnbo Torch Prize, in which forward Kim Yong-gwang was top scorer with twelve goals, seven scored in the first round and five in the second round.

After having finished second in the Highest Class in 2017, Hwaebul are currently taking part in their first continental competition, the 2018 AFC Cup. They defeated Erchim FC of Mongolia with a 7–0 aggregate score in the qualifying play-offs, and have advanced to the group stage, where they will play matches against April 25 of North Korea, Hang Yuen of Taiwan, and Benfica of Macau to try to qualify for the knockout stage.

== Players ==
=== Season 2025/26 ===
The following players were included in the 2026 Hwaebul Cup match against Sobaeksu Sports Club.

Note: Flags indicate national team as defined under FIFA eligibility rules; some limited exceptions apply. Players may hold more than one non-FIFA nationality.

| No. | Pos. | Nation | Player |
|---|---|---|---|
| 1 | GK | PRK | Ri Jin-Song |
| 5 | FW | PRK | Min Chol-Hyon |
| 9 | FW | PRK | Jo Il-Sin (captain) |
| 10 | MF | PRK | Kang Jin-Myong |
| 11 | MF | PRK | Jang Kum-Hyok |
| 12 | MF | PRK | Kim Jin-Seong |
| 13 | MF | PRK | Choe Tae-Song |
| 15 | MF | PRK | Kang Won |

| No. | Pos. | Nation | Player |
|---|---|---|---|
| 16 | MF | PRK | Kim Jong-Ryong |
| 17 | MF | PRK | An Kuk-Seong |
| 19 | MF | PRK | Ri Il-San |
| 20 | DF | PRK | Jo Hak-Myong |
| 21 | FW | PRK | Pak Ryong-Bong |
| 25 | FW | PRK | Kim Hyok-Myong |
| 26 | DF | PRK | Kim Yong-Ryong |
| 29 | GK | PRK | Pak Kang-Song |

== Managers ==
- (North Korea) Jo In-chol (first)
- (North Korea) Il Mun-ho (former)
- (North Korea) Jong Un-Hyok (current)

== Continental record ==
| Season | Competition | Round | Club | Home | Away | Aggregate |
|---|---|---|---|---|---|---|
| 2018 | AFC Cup | Qualifying play-off round | (Mongolia) Erchim | 3–0 | 4–0 | 7–0 |
| 2018 | AFC Cup | Group I | (North Korea) April 25 | 0–2 | 0–1 | 3rd |
| 2018 | AFC Cup | Group I | Benfica de Macau | 2–3 | 0–3 | 3rd |
| 2018 | AFC Cup | Group I | (Chinese Taipei) Hang Yuen | 6–1 | 1–0 | 3rd |

== Achievements ==
=== Domestic ===
- DPR Korea League: 3
  - Champions: 2014
  - Third place: 2013
- Hwaebul Cup: 2
  - Runners-up: 2014, 2016
- Osandŏk Prize: 3
  - Champions: 2015, 2016, 2017
- Paektusan Prize: 1
  - Champions: 2016
- Poch'ŏnbo Torch Prize: 3
  - Champions: 2013, 2017
  - Runners-up: 2014
