= Ponghwasan Sports Club =

- League: DPR Korea Women's Premier League (women's football team)
Home colours	Away colours

Ponghwasan Sports Club (Korean: 봉화산체육단; Hancha: 烽火山體育團) is a North Korean organization of physical education specialty with several departments.

It is named after Ponghwasan (봉화산), a mountain in Unsan County, North Pyongan Province.

Currently, the women's football team of Ponghwasan is participating in the 2024–25 DPR Korea Women's Premier League, having become champion in 2012.

The club also has a men's football team, which competed in the 2011 DPR Korea Premier Football League season.
