= Myohyangsan Sports Club =

North Korean sports club

Myohyangsan Sports Club (Korean: 묘향산체육단) is a sports club from North Korea.

== Sports teams ==
The men's football department competed in the 2013 DPR Korea Premier Football League seasons.

Myohyangsan SC also has a women's football team, which participated in 2013, 2018–19, 2019–20 and 2022–23 DPR Korea Women's Premier League seasons.

It is not known whether the team has sports teams other than football.
