= Kim Il Sung Stadium =

Stadium in Pyongyang, North Korea

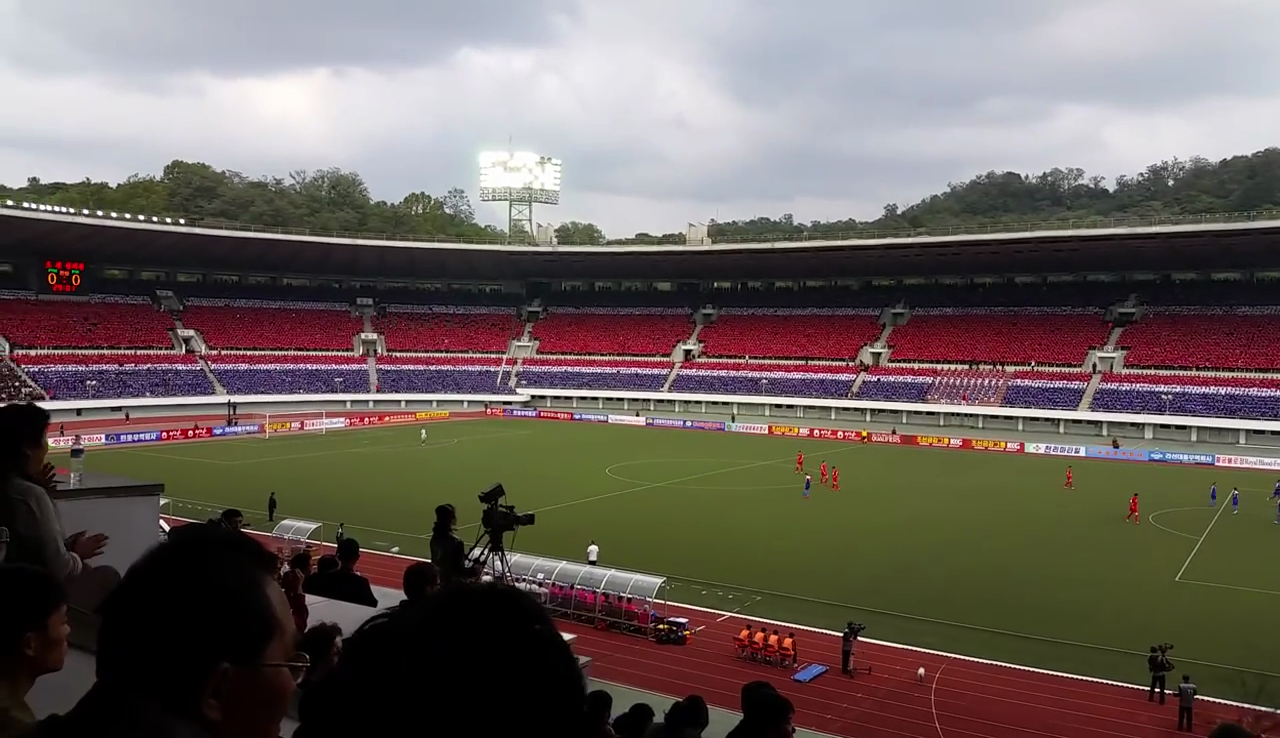
- The Kim Il Sung Stadium during a football match
- Interactive map of Kim Il Sung Stadium
- Former names: Kirimri Stadium; Moranbong Stadium
- Location: Pyongyang, North Korea
- Coordinates: 39°2′37.4″N 125°45′27.7″E
- Capacity: around 40,000 (2016–present)
- Surface: Artificial turf, running tracks
- Public transit: Chŏllima: Kaesŏn

Construction
- Opened: 1926 (original); 1969 (current)
- Renovated: 1982

Tenants
- North Korea national football team North Korea women's national football team Football clubs based in Pyongyang

- Kim Il Sung Stadium
- Hangul: 김일성경기장
- Hanja: 金日成競技場
- RR: Gim Ilseong gyeonggijang
- MR: Kim Ilsŏng kyŏnggijang

Kim Il Sung Stadium (Korean: 김일성경기장) is a multi-purpose stadium located in Pyongyang, the capital city of North Korea. The stadium is used primarily for association football matches.

== History ==
Kim Il Sung Stadium was originally built by the Japanese as the Girimri Stadium (기림리공설운동장) in 1926 and held the annual Kyung-Pyong Football Match between Kyungsung FC and Pyongyang FC from the 1920s to the 1940s.

After the division of Korea, it was used as a venue for speeches by politicians. On 14 October 1945, it was the site of Kim Il Sung's victory speech after the liberation of Pyongyang, called "Every Effort for the Building of a New Democratic Korea."

Most of the stadium was destroyed during the 1950–1953 Korean War, mostly by U.S. aerial bombing of the capital city during those years. Rebuilt in 1969, it was then called Moranbong Stadium, but in April 1982 it was renovated and renamed in honour of Kim Il Sung Stadium. It is used mainly for football matches, and until the 1990s hosted the mass games (now held in Rungnado May Day Stadium).

On 2 October 2019, 4.25 SC became the first football club from North Korea reaching an AFC Cup final. They reached the final after beating Hanoi FC from Vietnam at the Kim Il Sung Stadium in front of 5,500 spectators.

== Present day ==
Today, the Kim Il Sung Stadium is used as the home ground for the North Korea national football team, the North Korea women's national football team and the Pyongyang City Sports Club and Kigwancha Sports Club.

In 2008, on two occasions, a 2010 World Cup qualifying match between North and South Korea, due to be played in Pyongyang, had to be moved to Shanghai when authorities in the North refused to allow the South Korean national anthem to be played in Kim Il Sung Stadium, or the flag of South Korea to be flown, as North and South Korea have never granted each other formal diplomatic recognition.

The start and finish of the annual Pyongyang Marathon occurs at the Kim Il Sung Stadium.

== See also ==
- List of football stadiums in North Korea
