= Wolmido Sports Club =

Association football club in North Korea

Wŏlmido
- Full name: Wŏlmido Sports Club
- Founded: 23 March 2020
- Ground: Kimchaek Municipal Stadium, Kimch'aek
- Capacity: 30,000
- Manager: Yun Yong-il
- League: DPR Korea Premier Football League
| Home colours | Away colours | Third colours |

- Wolmido Sports Club
- Chosŏn'gŭl: 월미도체육단
- Hancha: 月尾島體育團
- Revised Romanization: Wolmido cheyukdan
- McCune–Reischauer: Wŏlmido ch'eyuktan

The Wŏlmido Sports Club is a North Korean professional football club affiliated with the Ministry of Culture and Fine Arts of North Korea, based in Kimchaek. Their home ground is Kimchaek Municipal Stadium, which has a capacity of 30,000 spectators. The men's team plays in the DPR Korea Premier Football League, whilst the women's team plays in the DPR Korea Women's League.

The club is named after Wŏlmido Island near Incheon.

== Players ==
Season 2025/26 Note: Flags indicate national team as defined under FIFA eligibility rules; some limited exceptions apply. Players may hold more than one non-FIFA nationality.

| No. | Pos. | Nation | Player |
|---|---|---|---|
| 1 | GK | PRK | Ryu Hyok |
| 5 | FW | PRK | Kim Ju-won |
| 6 | DF | PRK | Sin Hyon-song |
| 7 | MF | PRK | Mo Wi-gon |
| 8 | MF | PRK | Kim Sin-il |
| 9 | FW | PRK | An Kyong-ung |
| 11 | FW | PRK | Ri Jong-dok |
| 12 | MF | PRK | Kim Jong-hyok |
| 15 | DF | PRK | Jong Hyok |
| 16 | MF | PRK | Kim Mu-ryong |
| 17 | DF | PRK | Jin Ryong-bom |
| 19 | DF | PRK | Song Ryong-bom |

| No. | Pos. | Nation | Player |
|---|---|---|---|
| 20 | MF | PRK | Jo Kwang-ryong |
| 23 | MF | PRK | Kim Chol-won |
| 24 | MF | PRK | Pak Nam |
| 25 | DF | PRK | Pak Ryong-u |
| 26 | DF | PRK | Kim Il-chol (captain) |
| 27 | MF | PRK | Pak Hyo-il |
| 28 | MF | PRK | Pak Il-guk |
| 30 | FW | PRK | Kim Chan |
| 31 | GK | PRK | Kim Kwang-song |
| — | MF | PRK | Choe Kuk |

== Managers ==
- (North Korea) Kim Tong-il
- (North Korea) Yun Yong-il (2026-present)
