= Pyongyang Sports Club =

North Korean sports club

Pyongyang Sports Club 평양시체육단
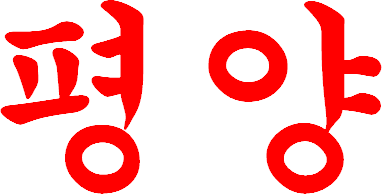
- Full name: Pyongyang Sports Club 평양시체육단
- Nickname: Chollima
- Founded: 30 April 1956; 70 years ago
- Ground: Kim Il Sung Stadium; Pyongyang
- Capacity: 50,000
- Chairman: Rim Sung-chan
- Manager: Hwang Chol-yong
- League: DPR Korea Premier Football League
- 2018/19: 6th
Home colours	Away colours

- Pyongyang Sports Club
- Hangul: 평양시체육단
- Hanja: 平壤市體育團
- RR: Pyeongyang-si cheyukdan
- MR: P'yŏngyang-si ch'eyuktan

Pyongyang Sports Club (Korean: 평양시체육단) is a North Korean organization of education specialty with several departments. This organization is based in Pyongyang and plays at the Kim Il Sung Stadium. As the sports club of the Workers' Party of Korea and Government of Pyongyang, Pyongyang SC is the largest sports club not affiliated with a state ministry.

Football is the most popular department in this organization. The men are presently playing in the DPR Korea Premier Football League, the highest football league in North Korea.

== History ==
This organization was founded by Kim Il Sung on 30 April 1956.

== Players ==
The following players were included in the 2025-2026 season squad.

Note: Flags indicate national team as defined under FIFA eligibility rules; some limited exceptions apply. Players may hold more than one non-FIFA nationality.

No.	Pos.	Nation	Player
2	DF	PRK	Kim Jin-won
3	DF	PRK	Rim Chang-su
4	DF	PRK	Ri Kwang
5	DF	PRK	Kung Chan (captain)
6	MF	PRK	Yun Yong-bom
7	MF	PRK	Ho Chol-song
9	FW	PRK	Cha Kum-hyok
10	MF	PRK	Ho Chol-myong
11	FW	PRK	Kim Chol-guk
12	DF	PRK	An Ju-hyok

No.	Pos.	Nation	Player
13	MF	PRK	Jo Wi-song
16	DF	PRK	Kim Ju-song
17	MF	PRK	An Phyong-il
18	GK	PRK	Jo Song-chol
19	MF	PRK	Kim Wi-song
20	FW	PRK	Kim Yu-bom
22	MF	PRK	Kim Il
23	MF	PRK	Mun Ju-yong
24	DF	PRK	Song Sung-hyuk
25	DF	PRK	Kim Kum-il
26	MF	PRK	Ryang Il-hyok
27	MF	PRK	Han Chung-guk

== Rivalries ==
Pyongyang's primary rival is April 25 - known as "the Pyongyang Derby".

== Managers ==
- (North Korea) Ri Chang-hun (2011–2012)
- (North Korea) Choi Yong-son (2012–2013)
- (North Korea) Ri Jong-man (2013–?)
- (North Korea) Hwang Chol-yong (2026–present)

== Achievements ==
=== Domestic ===
- DPR Korea Premier Football League: 5

(gold) 1991, 2004, 2005, 2007, 2009

- Paektusan Prize: 2

(gold) 2007
(bronze) 2016

- Poch'ŏnbo Torch Prize: 4

(gold) 2015
(silver) 2010
(bronze) 2005
SF 2014

- DPR Korea Championship: 1

(gold) 2004

=== International ===
- IFA Shield: 1 (Note: Fourth oldest football tournament, organized by the IFA (W.B.), and played between the local clubs of West Bengal and other invited ones.)

(silver) 1973

== Other sports ==
The club has branches in several other sports, including ice hockey.
