= DPR Korea Football Association =

North Korean football governing body

AFC
- Founded: 1945; 81 years ago
- Headquarters: Kumsongdong, Kwangbok Street, Pyongyang
- FIFA affiliation: 1958
- AFC affiliation: 1974
- EAFF affiliation: 2002
- President: Kim Il Guk

- DPR Korea Football Association
- Hangul: 조선민주주의인민공화국 축구 협회
- Hanja: 朝鮮民主主義人民共和國蹴球協會
- RR: Joseon minjujuui inmin gonghwaguk chukgu hyeophoe
- MR: Chosŏn minjujuŭi inmin konghwaguk ch'ukku hyŏphoe

The Democratic People's Republic of Korea Football Association (PRKFA, Korean: 조선민주주의인민공화국 축구 협회) is the governing body of football in North Korea.

The association was founded in 1945 and it joined FIFA in June 1958 and the Asian Football Confederation (AFC) in September 1974.

== Organization ==
PRKFA is "notoriously hard to contact". The association used to have a single fax number, and nowadays hosts a single email address. FIFA executive Jérôme Champagne remembers: "You sent a fax. Sometimes you got a reply", while football journalist James Piotr Montague's emails for "the best part of a decade" were always left unanswered. Even FIFA does not know for certain what the league system overseen by the PRKFA is like and what teams play in it.

=== League structure ===
The DPR Korea Football League is structured as follows (from highest to lowest):

1. DPR Korea Premier Football League
2. DPR Korea League 2
3. Amateur DPR Korea League 3

== Senior management ==
As of 2010, FIFA's website and the AFC's website listed Mun Jae-chol (문재철) as the association's president; he is also mentioned as such in a report published in November 2008.

Earlier presidents apparently include Choe Nam-gyun (최남균), listed on the FIFA website from July 2007 until at least July 2008, and in an overview of leading positions in the state (as of 2009?) on the website DPRK Search, with "September 2006" in brackets next to his name, and Rim Kyong-man (림경만), listed as president on FIFA's website until June 2007.

The Secretary General is Kim Jong-sik. Ri Ryong-nam was president until some time around 2022. Former referee coordinator was Jang Myong Ho.

Name	Position	Source
(North Korea) Kim Il Guk	President	
(North Korea) An Song-Il	Vice President	
(North Korea) Han Un-gyong	2nd Vice President	
(North Korea) Mun Jang-hong	3rd Vice President	
(North Korea) Pang Kwang-su	4th Vice President	
(North Korea) Kim Jong-sik	General Secretary	
(North Korea) Kim Chol-ung	Technical Director	
(North Korea) Sin Yong Nam	Mens Team Coach	
(North Korea) Pak Song Jin	Women's Team Coach	
(North Korea) Kim Yong-chol	Media/Communications Manager	
(North Korea) Song Hye Yong	Referee Coordinator	

== Honours ==
=== Men's ===
AFC Challenge Cup

- (gold) Champions: 2010, 2012
- (bronze) Third place: 2008

Asian Games

- (gold) Gold medal: 1978
- (silver) Silver medal: 1990

EAFF E-1 Football Championship

- (bronze) Third place: 2005, 2015

=== Men's under-20 ===
AFC U-20 Asian Cup

- (gold) Champions: 1976, 2006, 2010
- (silver) Runners-up: 1990, 2014
- (bronze) Third place: 1975, 1978, 1986

=== Men's under-17 ===
AFC U-17 Asian Cup

- (gold) Champions: 2010, 2014
- (silver) Runners-up: 2004, 2006
- (bronze) Semifinals: 2016

=== Women's ===
AFC Women's Asian Cup

- (gold) Champions: 2001, 2003, 2008
- (silver) Runners-up: 1993, 1997
- (bronze) Third place: 1999, 2006

Asian Games

- (gold) Gold medal: 2002, 2006
- (silver) Silver medal: 2010, 2022
- (bronze) Bronze medal: 1990

EAFF E-1 Football Championship (women)

- (gold) Champions: 2013, 2015, 2017
- (silver) Runners-up: 2005, 2008

=== Women's under-20 ===
FIFA U-20 Women's World Cup

- (gold) Champions: 2006, 2016, 2024
- (silver) Runners-up: 2008, 2026

AFC U-20 Women's Asian Cup

- (gold) Champions: 2007, 2024
- (silver) Runners-up: 2006, 2011, 2013, 2015, 2017, 2019, 2026
- (bronze) Third place: 2004, 2009

=== Women's under-17 ===
FIFA U-17 Women's World Cup

- (gold) Champions: 2008, 2016, 2024, 2025
- (silver) Runners-up: 2012
- (bronze) Third place: 2026

AFC U-17 Women's Asian Cup

- (gold) Champions: 2007, 2015, 2017, 2024, 2026
- (silver) Runners-up: 2009, 2011, 2013, 2019
