= List of North Korean football champions =

The North Korean football champions are the winners of the highest league in North Korean football, which is currently the DPR Korea Premier Football League.

Also listed here are the winners of North Korea's cup competitions (the Republican Championship, from 1972 to 2011, and the Hwaebul Cup from 2013 on), and the other annual league-like "Prize" competitions that North Korea's football clubs take part in (the Man'gyŏngdae Prize, the Osandŏk Prize, the Paektusan Prize, and the Poch'ŏnbo Torch Prize), which were used prior to the 2017–18 season to determine which teams played for the National Championship.

== DPR Korea Football League ==
=== Technical Innovation Contests & National Championship ===
Season	Champion	Runner-up	Third place
1960–1984	Unknown		
1985	April 25		
1986	April 25		
1987	April 25		
1988	April 25		
1989	Ch'andongja		
1990	April 25		
1991	P'yŏngyang		
1992	April 25		
1993	April 25		
1994	April 25		
1995	April 25	Rimyŏngsu	Kigwanch'a
1996	Kigwanch'a	Rimyŏngsu	April 25
1997	Kigwanch'a		
1998	Kigwanch'a		
1999	Kigwanch'a		
2000	Kigwanch'a		
2001	Amnokgang		
2002	April 25	Rimyŏngsu	Amnokgang
2003	April 25		
2004	P'yŏngyang		
2005	P'yŏngyang		
2006	Amnokgang		Kigwanch'a
2007	P'yŏngyang		
2008	Amnokgang		
2009	P'yŏngyang		

== DPR Korea Football League (Round-robin tournament competitions) ==
=== Highest Class Football League ===
Season	Champion	Runner-up	Third place
2010	April 25	Sobaeksu	Amnokgang
2011	April 25	Sobaeksu	Amnokgang
2012	April 25	Sŏnbong	Rimyŏngsu
2013	April 25	Man'gyŏngbong	Hwaebul
2014	Hwaebul	April 25	Amnokgang
2015	April 25	Hwaebul	
2016	Kigwancha	April 25	Amnokgang
2017	April 25	Hwaebul	

=== DPR Korea Premier Football League ===
Season	Champion	Runner-up	Third place
2017–18	April 25	Ryŏmyŏng	Kigwancha
2018–19	In progress		

== Performance by club ==
Club	Winners	Runners-up	Third place	Winning seasons	Runners-up seasons	Third place seasons
April 25	17	2	1	1985, 1986, 1987, 1988, 1990, 1992, 1993, 1994, 1995, 2002, 2003, 2010, 2011, 2012, 2013, 2015, 2017	2014, 2016	1996
Kigwanch'a	6		2	1996, 1997, 1998, 1999, 2000, 2016		1995, 2006
P'yŏngyang	5			1991, 2004, 2005, 2007, 2009		
Amnokgang	3		5	2001, 2006, 2008		2002, 2010, 2011, 2014, 2016
Hwaebul	1	2	1	2014	2015, 2017	2013
Ch'andongja	1			1989		
Rimyŏngsu		3	1		1995, 1996, 2002	2012
Sobaeksu		2			2010, 2011	
Sŏnbong		1			2012	
Man'gyŏngbong		1			2013	

== DPR Korea Football League (Tournament|Elimination tournament competitions) ==
=== DPR Korea Championship ===
Held 1972–2011.

Season	Champion	Runner-up	Third place	Final score
1972–2000	Unknown			
2001	April 25			
2002–2003	Unknown			
2004	P'yŏngyang			
2005	Unknown			
2006	April 25			
2007	Amnokgang			
2009	Kyŏnggong'ŏpsong	Amnokgang		1-0
2011	April 25	Sobaeksu	Amnokgang	played as simple round robin

==== Performance by club ====
Club	Winners	Runners-up	Third place	Winning seasons	Runners-up seasons	Third place seasons
April 25	3			2001, 2006, 2011		
Amnokgang	1	1	1	2007	2009	2011
P'yŏngyang	1			2004		
Kyŏnggong'ŏpsong	1			2009		
Sobaeksu		1		2011		

=== Hwaebul Cup ===
Played since 2013, evidently as a replacement for the Republican Championship in men's football.

Season	Champion	Runner-up	Semi-finalists	Final	Notes
2013	April 25	Sŏnbong	Amnokgang, Hwaebul	2-2 a.e.t (7-8 p); Kim Il-sung Stadium	Sŏnbong won, but match awarded to April 25 after it was deemed Sŏnbong had fielded an ineligible player.
2014	April 25	Hwaebul	?	1-0; Yanggakdo Stadium	Semi-finalists not known
2015	April 25	Kigwancha	Kyŏnggong'ŏpsong, Wŏlmido	5-1; Rungrado 1st of May Stadium	
2016	April 25	Hwaebul	Kyŏnggong'ŏpsong, ?	2-2 (3-2 a.e.t); Sŏsan Stadium	Only one of two semi-finalists known
2017	Sobaeksu	Ryŏmyŏng	Hwaebul, Kigwancha	1-1 (2-1 a.e.t); Rungrado 1st of May Stadium	Hwaebul finished 3rd, Kigwancha 4th.

==== Performance by club ====
Club	Winners	Runners-up	Semi-finalists	Winning seasons	Runners-up seasons	Semi-finalist seasons
April 25	4	—		2013, 2014, 2015, 2016	—	
Sobaeksu	1	—		2017	—	
Hwaebul	—	2	2	—	2014, 2016	2013, 2017
Kigwancha	—	1	1	—	2015	2017
Sŏnbong	—	1		—	2013	
Ryŏmyŏng	—	1		—	2017	
Kyŏnggong'ŏpsong	—	—	2	—	—	2015, 2016
Amnokgang	—	—	1	—	—	2013
Wŏlmido	—	—	1	—	—	2015

=== Mangyongdae Prize ===
Season	Champion	Runner-up	Third place	Fourth place	Final
2000	Rimyŏngsu				
2001	Rimyŏngsu				
2002	April 25				
2004	Kigwancha				
2005	Kigwancha				
2006	Unknown				
2007	Amnokgang				
2008	Amnokgang				
2009	April 25				
2010	Rimyŏngsu			Sobaeksu	
2011	Unknown				
2012	April 25				
2013	Rimyŏngsu	Amnokgang			2-1; Kim Il-sung Stadium
2014	April 25	Amnokgang	Kigwancha	Sobaeksu	1-0; Kim Il-sung Stadium
2015	April 25	Kigwancha	Rimyŏngsu	Sobaeksu	1-0; Kim Il-sung Stadium
2016	April 25	Kigwancha	Ryŏmyŏng		1-0; Rungrado 1st of May Stadium
2017	April 25	February 8	Hwaebul	Sŏnbong	2-0; Rungrado 1st of May Stadium

==== Performance by club ====
Club	Winners	Runners-up	Third place	Fourth place	Winning seasons	Runners-up seasons	Third place seasons	Fourth place seasons
April 25	7				2002, 2009, 2012, 2014, 2015, 2016, 2017			
Rimyŏngsu	4		1		2000, 2001, 2010, 2013		2015	
Kigwancha	2	2	1		2004, 2005	2015, 2016	2014	
Amnokgang	2	2			2007, 2008	2013, 2014		
February 8	—	1				2017		
Ryŏmyŏng	—	—	1				2016	
Hwaebul	—	—	1				2017	
Sobaeksu				3				2010, 2014, 2015
Sŏnbong				1				2017

=== Osandok Prize ===
Season	Champion	Runner-up	Third place
2015	Hwaebul	Kyŏnggong'ŏpsong	Sobaeksu
2016	Hwaebul		February 8
2017	Hwaebul		

==== Performance by club ====
Club	Winners	Runners-up	Third place	Winning seasons	Runners-up seasons	Third place seasons
Hwaebul	3	—	—	2015, 2016, 2017		
Kyŏnggong'ŏpsong	—	1		—	2015	
Sobaeksu	—		1	—		2015
February 8	—		1	—		2016

=== Paektusan Prize ===
Season	Champion	Runner-up	Third place	Final
2007	P'yŏngyang	Amnokgang	Kyŏnggong'ŏpsong	
2008	Unknown			
2009	Unknown			
2010	Rimyŏngsu			
2011	Rimyŏngsu			
2012	Amnokgang	Rimyŏngsu	Kigwancha	
2013	Unknown			
2014	Unknown			
2015			April 25	
2016	Hwaebul	Sobaeksu	P'yŏngyang	1-0; Sŏsan Stadium
2017	April 25	February 8	Hwaebul	1-0; Sŏsan Stadium

==== Performance by club ====
Club	Winners	Runners-up	Third place	Winning seasons	Runners-up seasons	Third place seasons
Rimyŏngsu	2	1		2010, 2011	2012	
Amnokgang	1	1		2012	2007	
P'yŏngyang	1		1	2007		2016
Hwaebul	1		1	2016		2017
April 25	1		1	2017		2015
Sobaeksu		1		2016		
February 8		1			2017	
Kyŏnggong'ŏpsong			1			2007
Kigwancha			1			2016

=== Pochonbo Torch Prize ===
Season	Champion	Runner-up	Third place	Final
2005	April 25	Amnokgang	P'yŏngyang	
2006	Rimyŏngsu			? Hyesan Stadium
2007	Kigwanch'a			
2008	Unknown			
2009	Unknown			
2010	Sobaeksu	P'yŏngyang	Kigwancha	? Kim Il-sung Stadium
2011	April 25			
2012	Rimyŏngsu			
2013	Hwaebul	Kyŏnggong'ŏpsong	Rimyŏngsu	2-1 a.e.t
2014	April 25	Hwaebul	Sobaeksu or | P'yŏngyang	1-0
2015	P'yŏngyang	Rimyŏngsu	Wŏlmido or ?	2-1; Rungrado 1st of May Stadium
2016	Amnokgang	Sobaeksu	Kigwancha	2-1; Sŏsan Stadium
2017	Unknown			Kim Il-sung Stadium

==== Performance by club ====
Club	Winners	Runners-up	Third place*	Winning seasons	Runners-up seasons	Third place seasons
April 25	3			2005, 2011, 2014		
Rimyŏngsu	2	1	1	2006, 2012	2015	2013
P'yŏngyang	1	1	1 (+1)	2015	2010	2005, (2014)
Sobaeksu	1	1	(1)	2010	2016	(2014)
Amnokgang	1	1		2016	2005	
Hwaebul	1	1		2013	2014	
Kigwancha	1		3	2007		2010, 2016
Kyŏnggong'ŏpsong		1			2013	
Wŏlmido			(1)			(2015)
* - Brackets indicate the club reached the semi-finals, but result of third-place match is unknown
