= DPR Korea Premier Football League =

Association football league

- Organising body: DPR Korea Football Association
- Founded: 1960; 66 years ago (original); 2017; 9 years ago (current form)
- Country: North Korea
- Confederation: AFC
- Number of clubs: 12
- Level on pyramid: 1
- Relegation to: DPR Korea Football League 2
- Domestic cup(s): Hwaebul Cup; DPR Korea Championship; Mangyongdae Prize; Paektusan Prize; Pochonbo Torch Prize; Osandok Prize
- International cup: AFC Challenge League
- Current champions: April 25 (23 titles) (2024–25)
- Most championships: April 25 (23 titles)
- Broadcaster(s): Korean Central Television
- Current: 2025–26 DPR Korea Premier Football League

The DPR Korea Premier Football League (Korean: 조선민주주의인민공화국 1부류축구련맹전) is the men's top professional football division of the North Korean football league system. The DPR Korea Premier Football League was established in 2017, replacing previous football tournaments held in a knockout format which served as a highest-level football competition in North Korea.

== History ==
Initially, all sports in the country were on an amateur basis with competitions called Technical Innovation Contests being held several times a year since the 1960s until 2009. Technical Innovation Games typically started in February each year.

In 1977, sport in the country was reformed, creating professional teams with paid players for each sport. Since then, an annual championship, called the National Championship, also known as the DPR Korea Championships, has been held September through each year.

Several other competitions held together with the National Championship each year include the Man'gyŏndae Prize held since at least 2002 in March through April in honour of Kim Il Sung's birthday, the Paektusan Prize held since at least 2010 in February in honour of Kim Jong Il's birthday, and the Poch'ŏnbo Torch Prize held since 2010 in May through June to mark the anniversary of the Battle of Poch'ŏnbo. The Osandŏk Prize competition, held in December in honour of Kim Jong Suk, was originally the primary tournament of North Korean ice hockey and other winter sports, but football was added in 2015. Hwaebul Cup was first held in 2013.

In 2010, football's National Championship was renamed Top Class Football League or Highest Class Football League, but was still held together with the National Championships of other sports, and the other football competitions of the year. This competition was last held in October 2017, after which it was replaced by the current DPR Korea Premier Football League (Note: Each sports club - including their football sections - is classified as 1st class(1부류), 2nd class(2부류), and 3rd class(3부류). 1st class clubs are the fully professional teams that play in the highest levels of the given sport; in football's case, the DPRK Premier League and the second level. 2nd class clubs are smaller and rated to be of lower grade, though their top football teams take part in the upper levels and occasionally do achieve promotion into the highest division; provincial representative clubs are also included in the 2nd class. 3rd class clubs do not take part in the highest levels of competition, as they are strictly amateur, being the free-time sports clubs belonging to various factories and other state enterprises. There are several national-level amateur tournaments as well, such as the Inter-Provincial Games and the Songun Torch Prize for provincial representative teams, as well as annual football tournaments for the amateur factory and civil servant teams.) held in the home-and-away round-robin style used in most other countries.

As of the 2017–18 season, featuring thirteen teams that play a full season of home-and-away matches. The 2018–2019 season started on 1 December 2018 and was scheduled to end October 2019.

== Participation in Asian club competitions ==
Due to the unusual nature of the domestic football competitions, North Korean teams only rarely took part in international club competitions of the Asian Football Confederation. The first time a North Korean club took part in an AFC club competition was the 1985–86 Asian Club Championship, when April 25 SC took part as the previous season's North Korean champions, though they did not advance from the qualifying round. North Korean teams also took part in the 1986, 1987, 1988–89, 1989–90, 1990–91 and 1991 editions of the Asian Club Championships, with some success; in 1988–89, April 25 finished first in their group in the qualifying round, but did not advance from their group in the semi-final round. The best result of a North Korean club was in the 1990–91 Asian Club Championship, when April 25 reached the semi-finals, losing to Liaoning of China; however, April 25 then went on to defeat Pelita Jaya of Indonesia in the third-place match. April 25 represented North Korea in six of the seven seasons in which North Korean teams took part in the Asian Club Championship. The only time a different club took part was in the 1989–90 edition, in which North Korea was represented by Ch'andongja SC; Ch'andongja finished last in their qualifying round group, and did not advance.

After the 1991 Asian Club Championship, in which April 25 advanced as far as the group stage, North Korean teams did not compete in any Asian club competitions for over twenty years, when Rimyŏngsu were invited to take part in the 2014 edition of the AFC President's Cup. Rimyŏngsu performed well, finishing second in their group in the first round. They went undefeated in the second round to top their group and advance to the final, in which they lost 1–2 to HTTU Ashgabat of Turkmenistan - who had finished first in Rimyŏngsu's group in the first round. However, the 2014 edition proved to be the last time the President's Cup was held.

The 2016 North Korean champions and runners up, April 25 and Kigwancha respectively, were invited to take part in the 2017 AFC Cup. Both started in the group stage, in the same group; April 25 advanced to the knockout stage, with a +1 goal differential over Kigwancha. April 25 faced Bengaluru of India, losing 0:3 on aggregate. The 2017 DPRK League champions and runners up are presently taking part in the 2018 AFC Cup; as the champions, April 25 will begin play in Group I of the group stage. The runners-up, Hwaebul SC, had to first play in the play-off round of the qualifying play-offs. There, they faced Erchim of Mongolia, winning 7–0 on aggregate to advance to the group stage, where they will play matches against April 25, Hang Yuen of Taiwan, and Benfica de Macau. Both teams will travel abroad for away matches, and foreign teams will travel to North Korea; April 25 will use the Rungrado 1st of May Stadium as its home field, whilst Hwaebul will use Kim Il Sung Stadium as its home venue. As a result of the new league structure, the champions and runners up of the 2017–18 Premier League season will take part in the 2019 AFC Cup.

== Clubs ==
Locations of the DPR Korea Premier League clubs
Location of clubs in Pyongyang

Club	Location	Stadium	Capacity	Affiliation
Amrokkang	P'yŏngyang	Yanggakdo Stadium	30,000	Ministry of Social Security
April 25	P'yŏngyang	Kim Il Sung Stadium	50,000	Korean People's Army
Hwaebul	Pochŏn	Hwaebul Stadium	5,000	Socialist Patriotic Youth League
Jebi	P'yŏngyang	P'yŏngyang City Stadium	10,000	Korean People's Army Air Force
Kigwancha	Sinŭiju	Sinuiju Stadium	17,500	Korean State Railway
Kyŏnggong'ŏpsong	P'yŏngyang	P'yŏngyang City Stadium	10,000	Ministry of Light Industry
P'yŏngyang	P'yŏngyang	Kim Il Sung Stadium	50,000	Workers' Party of Korea
Rimyŏngsu	Sariwŏn	Sariwŏn Youth Stadium	35,000	Ministry of People's Security
Ryŏmyŏng	P'yŏngyang	Kim Il Sung Stadium	50,000	Korean People's Army
Sobaeksu	P'yŏngyang	Yanggakdo Stadium	30,000	Korean People's Army
Sŏnbong	Rasŏn	Rajin Stadium	20,000	Worker-Peasant Red Guards
Wŏlmido	Kimch'aek	Kimch'aek Municipal Stadium	30,000	Ministry of Culture and Fine Arts

== Champions ==
=== Technical Innovation Contests ===
- System was unknown

Season	Champion	Runner-up
1960–1983	Unknown	
1984	April 25 (1)	Amnokgang
1985	April 25 (2)	
1986	April 25 (3)	
1987	April 25 (4)	
1988	April 25 (5)	
1989	Ch'andongja (1)	
1990	April 25 (6)	
1991	P'yŏngyang (1)	
1992	April 25 (7)	
1993	April 25 (8)	
1994	April 25 (9)	
1995	April 25 (10)	Rimyŏngsu
1996	Kigwanch'a (1)	Rimyŏngsu
1997	Kigwanch'a (2)	
1998	Kigwanch'a (3)	
1999	Kigwanch'a (4)	
2000	Kigwanch'a (5)	
2001	Amnokgang (1)	
2002	April 25 (11)	Rimyŏngsu
2003	April 25 (12)	
2004	P'yŏngyang (2)	
2005	P'yŏngyang (3)	
2006	Amnokgang (2)	
2007	P'yŏngyang (4)	Amnokgang
2008	Amnokgang (3)	
2009	P'yŏngyang (5)	

=== Highest Class Football League ===
- Round-robin tournament system was introduced

Season	Champion	Runner-up
2010	April 25 (13)	Sobaeksu
2011	April 25 (14)	Kigwancha
2012	April 25 (15)	Sŏnbong
2013	April 25 (16)	Man'gyŏngbong
2014	Hwaebul (1)	April 25
2015	April 25 (17)	Hwaebul
2016	Kigwancha (6)	April 25
2017	April 25 (18)	Hwaebul

=== DPR Korea Premier Football League ===
Season	Champion	Runner-up
2017–18	April 25 (19)	Ryomyong
2018–19	April 25 (20)	Ryomyong
2019–20	Cancelled due to COVID-19 pandemic	
2020–21	Ryomyong (1)	April 25
2021–22	April 25 (21)	Ryomyong
2022–23	April 25 (22)	Ryomyong
2023–24	Ryomyong (2)	April 25
2024–25	April 25 (23)	Sŏbaeksu

== Performance by club ==
Club	Winners	Runners-up	Winning seasons	Runners-up seasons
April 25	23	4	1984, 1985, 1986, 1987, 1988, 1990, 1992, 1993, 1994, 1995, 2002, 2003, 2010, 2011, 2012, 2013, 2015, 2017, 2017–18, 2018–19, 2021–22, 2022–23, 2024–25	2014, 2016, 2020–21, 2023–24
Kigwanch'a	6	1	1996, 1997, 1998, 1999, 2000, 2016	2011
P'yŏngyang	5		1991, 2004, 2005, 2007, 2009	
Amnokgang	3	1	2001, 2006, 2008	2007
Ryomyong	2	4	2020–21, 2023–24	2017–18, 2018–19, 2021–22, 2022–23
Hwaebul	1	2	2014	2015, 2017
Ch'andongja	1	0	1989	
Rimyŏngsu	0	3		1995, 1996, 2002
Sobaeksu	0	3		2010, 2022–23, 2024-2025
Man'gyŏngbong	0	1		2013

== Top goalscorers ==
9
Season	Player	Team	Goals
2017–18	(North Korea) An Il-bom	April 25	19
2018–19	(North Korea) Rim Chol-min	April 25	21
2021–22	(North Korea) Choe Ju-song	Amnokgang	
2022–23	(North Korea) Pak Kwang-chon	Ryomyong	22
2023–24	(North Korea) Pak Kwang-chon	Ryomyong	
2024–25	(North Korea) Pak Kwang-chon	Ryomyong	
