= 2019–20 DPR Korea Premier Football League =

DPR Korea Premier League
- Season: 2019–20

The 2019–20 DPR Korea Premier Football League is the third season of the reformed DPR Korea Premier Football League, the top North Korean association football league, to use a home-and-away format. The league started on 5 December 2019. The season was expected to finish in October 2020, however, due to COVID-19 prevention measures, league games did not resume after the winter break. It is not known whether the season was cancelled or postponed.

April 25 are the defending champions.

== Teams ==
Kalmaegi were relegated from the previous season. No teams were promoted, so a total of 12 teams participate:

Location football club of DPR Korea Premier Football League

Club	Location	Stadium	Affiliation
Amrokkang	P'yŏngyang	Yanggakdo Stadium	Ministry of People's Security
April 25	P'yŏngyang	Yanggakdo Stadium	Korean People's Army
Hwaebul	Pochŏn	Hwaebul Stadium	Kimilsungist-Kimjongilist Youth League
Jebi	P'yŏngyang	P'yŏngyang City Stadium	Korean People's Army Air Force
Kigwancha	P'yŏngyang	Yanggakdo Stadium	Korean State Railway
Kyŏnggong'ŏpsong	P'yŏngyang	P'yŏngyang City Stadium	Ministry of Light Industry
P'yŏngyang	P'yŏngyang	Kim Il-sung Stadium	Workers' Party of Korea
Rimyŏngsu	Sariwŏn	Sariwŏn Youth Stadium	Ministry of People's Security
Ryŏmyŏng	P'yŏngyang	Kim Il-sung Stadium	Korean People's Army
Sobaeksu	P'yŏngyang	Yanggakdo Stadium	Korean People's Army
Sŏnbong	Rasŏn	Rajin Stadium	Worker-Peasant Red Guards
Wŏlmido	Kimch'aek	Kimch'aek Municipal Stadium	Ministry of Culture and Fine Arts

== League table ==
Note: The following table is compiled from known results reported in the news media, and may not align with the official table.

Pos	Team	Pld	W	D	L	GF	GA	GD	Pts
1	Sŏbaeksu	6	5	0	1	12	4	+8	15
2	Ryŏmyŏng	6	4	2	0	11	2	+9	14
3	April 25	6	4	2	0	10	3	+7	14
4	Sŏnbong	6	3	2	1	8	6	+2	11
5	Amnokgang	6	3	2	1	6	5	+1	11
6	Kigwancha	6	2	1	3	8	4	+4	7
7	Hwaebul	6	2	1	3	7	10	−3	7
8	P'yŏngyang	6	2	1	3	4	7	−3	7
9	Rimyŏngsu	6	1	3	2	6	7	−1	6
10	Wŏlmido	6	1	2	3	7	9	−2	5
11	Kyŏnggong'ŏpsong	6	0	1	5	5	14	−9	1
12	Jebi	6	0	1	5	1	14	−13	1

Updated to match(es) played on 22 December 2019. Source: KCNAWatch, oball.ru
Rules for classification: 1) Points; 2) Goal difference; 3) Goals scored.

== See also ==
- 2020 Hwaebul Cup
