= 2025–26 DPR Korea Premier Football League =

DPR Korea Premier League
- Season: 2025–26
- Dates: 1 December 2025 – November 2026

The 2025–26 DPR Korea Premier Football League is the 66th season of the DPR Korea Premier Football League, the top-flight football competition in North Korea and the fourth season since the 2022–23 league restructuring. The season began on 1 December 2025.

The defending champions are April 25, who won the 2024–25 season.

In the previous 2024–25 edition, Paekkumsan was relegated from the DPR Korea Premier League, while Kyonggongopsong was promoted to the 2025–26 season from the second tier.

As in previous editions, the competition is divided into three stages.

After the first stage, Hwaebul and April 25 were among the leading teams, having recorded 18 and 17 points respectively after nine matches. They were followed by Pyongyang, Sobaeksu, Sonbong, Ryomyong and Amrokkang.

== Teams ==
The twelve teams participating in the 2025–26 men's competition are:

- April 25 (Pyongyang)
- Ryomyong (Pyongyang)
- Sobaeksu (Pyongyang)
- Rimyongsu (Sariwon)
- Hwaebul (Pochon County)
- Amrokkang (Pyongyang)
- Kigwancha (Sinuiju)
- Jebi (Pyongyang)
- Wolmido (Kimch’aek)
- Pyongyang (Pyongyang)
- Kyonggongopsong (Pyongyang)
- Sonbong (Rason)

== Results ==
=== First round ===
The opening matches of the first stage were held on 1 December 2025 at Kim Il Sung Stadium, beginning the 2025–26 men's Premier League season.

1 December 2025 First round	Sobaeksu	1–3	Hwaebul	Pyongyang
				Stadium: Kim Il Sung Stadium

1 December 2025 First round	Ryomyong	3–0	Rimyongsu	Pyongyang
				Stadium: Kim Il Sung Stadium

5 December 2025 First round	Jebi	2–1	Wolmido	Pyongyang
				Stadium: Kim Il Sung Stadium

=== Second round ===
The second round matches began on 25 March 2026 at Kim Il Sung Stadium, as part of the 2026 Spring National Sports Festival.

25 March 2026 Second round	Pyongyang	1–1	Ryomyong	Pyongyang
				Stadium: Kim Il Sung Stadium

25 March 2026 Second round	Kigwancha	2–1	Kyonggongopsong	Pyongyang
				Stadium: Kim Il Sung Stadium

27 March 2026 Second round	Hwaebul	2–1	April 25	Pyongyang
				Stadium: Kim Il Sung Stadium

10 May 2026 Second round	April 25	1–2	Sobaeksu	Pyongyang
				Stadium: Kim Il Sung Stadium

Second round	Ryomyong	4–2	Kigwancha	Pyongyang
	Kim Pom Hyok 7'; Yom Chol Gyong 38', 72' (pen.); Ri Un Gwang 88'		Choe Kwang Hwi 22'; Hong Paek Hyon 90'	Stadium: Kim Il Sung Stadium

== Standings ==
=== After 9 matches ===
Pos	Team	Pld	W	D	L	GF	GA	GD	Pts
1	Hwaebul	9	5	3	1	–	–	–	18
2	April 25	9	–	–	–	–	–	–	17
3	Pyongyang	9	–	–	–	–	–	–	–
4	Sobaeksu	9	–	–	–	–	–	–	–
5	Ryomyong	9	–	–	–	–	–	–	–
6	Sonbong	9	–	–	–	–	–	–	–
7	Amnokgang	9	–	–	–	–	–	–	–
8	?	9	–	–	–	–	–	–	–
9	Rimyongsu	9	–	–	–	–	–	–	–
10	?	9	–	–	–	–	–	–	–
11	?	9	–	–	–	–	–	–	–
12	Wolmido	9	–	–	–	–	–	–	–

=== Second round ===
Pos	Team	Pld	W	D	L	GF	GA	GD	Pts
1	Ryomyong	22	–	–	–	–	–	–	–
2	Amnokgang	22	–	–	–	24	–	–	–
3	Sonbong	22	–	–	–	–	–	–	–
4	Wolmido	22	–	–	–	–	–	–	–
5	?	22	–	–	–	–	–	–	–
6	Rimyongsu	22	–	–	–	–	–	–	–
7	?	22	–	–	–	–	–	–	–
8	?	22	–	–	–	–	–	–	–
9	?	22	–	–	–	–	–	–	–
10	?	22	–	–	–	–	–	–	–
11	?	22	–	–	–	–	–	–	–
12	?	22	–	–	–	–	–	–	–
