= An Il-bom =

North Korean footballer (born 1990)

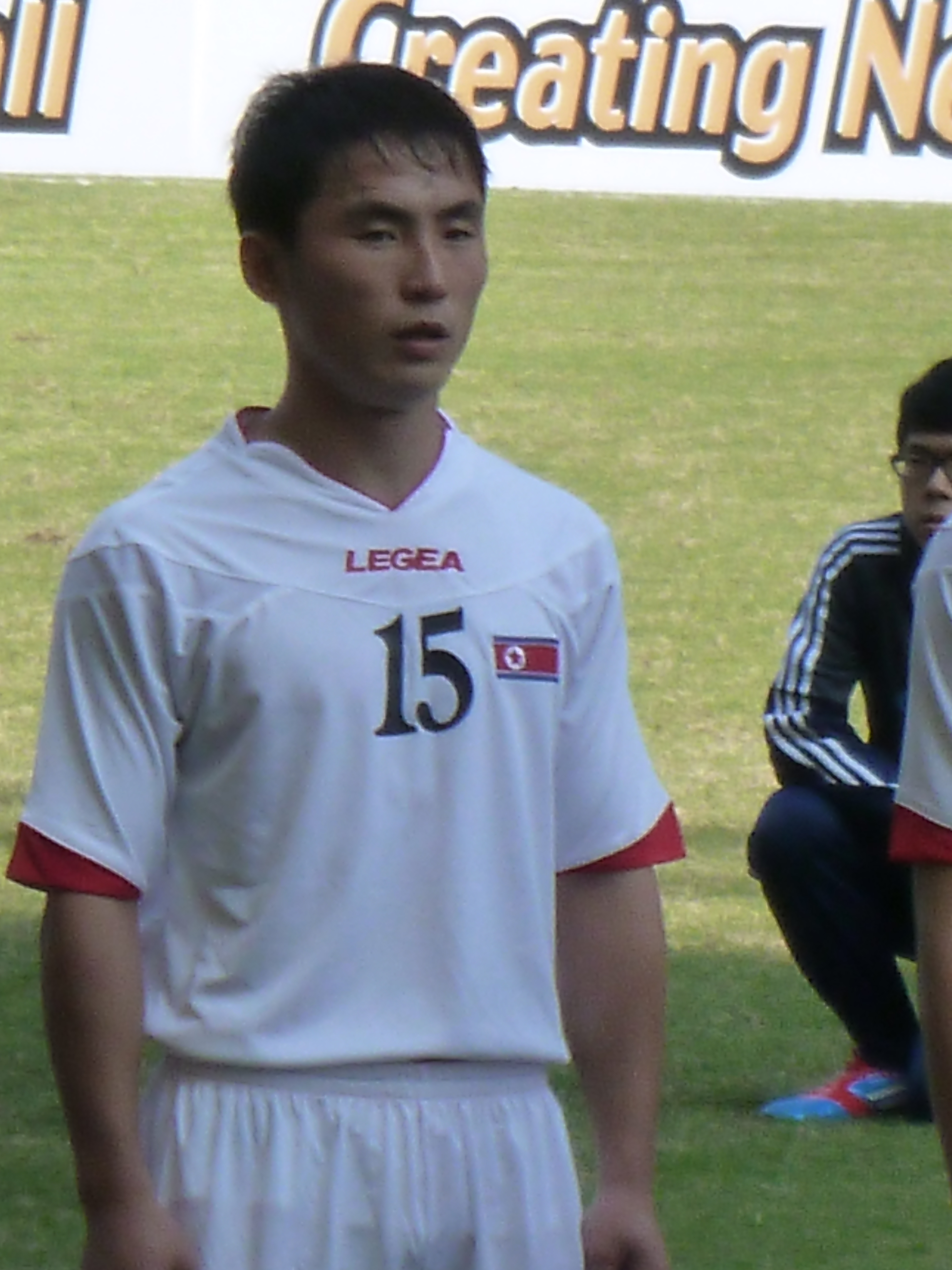

Personal information
- Date of birth: 2 December 1990 (age 35)
- Place of birth: Pyongyang, North Korea
- Height: 1.71 m (5 ft 7 1/2 in)
- Position: Midfielder

Team information
- Current team: April 25
- Number: 10

Senior career*
Years	Team	Apps	(Gls)
2009	Sobaeksu		
2009–2010	Radnički Kragujevac	10	(3)
2010–2013	Sobaeksu		
2014–	April 25		

International career^{‡}
2007	North Korea U17	4	(1)
2008	North Korea U19		
2012–2018	North Korea	11	(4)
- * Club domestic league appearances and goals ‡ National team caps and goals as of 10 November 2018

- An Il-bom
- Hangul: 안일범
- RR: An Ilbeom
- MR: An Ilbŏm

An Il-bom (Korean: 안일범; born 2 December 1990) is a North Korean football midfielder presently playing for April 25 in the DPR Korea Premier Football League.

== Career ==
In the season 2009–10 he played with FK Radnički 1923 in the Serbian League West (national third tier) along with his compatriots Ri Kwang-il and Myong Cha-hyon. They all came from Sobaeksu.

He made his debut for the North Korea national football team in 2010. He was part of the squad at the 2013 EAFF East Asian Cup.

He earlier had been part of the North Korea national under-17 football team at the 2006 AFC U-17 Championship and then at the 2007 FIFA U-17 World Cup where he was the team capitan. He played all four games of his team and scored one goal. Then he was part of the North Korean squad at the 2008 AFC U-19 Championship.

An returned to North Korea to play with April 25, wearing number 10. He scored both goals in the final of the 2016 edition of the Hwaebul Cup against Hwaebul, the first in the 9th minute, and the second on a penalty in the 13th minute. The score was 2–2 after extra time, and April 25 went on to win the match 3–2 on penalties. He was also part of the April 25 team which finished as runners-up in the 2019 AFC Cup.

== Honours ==
Radnički Kragujevac

- Serbian League West: 2009–10

April 25

- DPR Korea Premier Football League: 2015, 2017, 2017–18, 2018–19, 2021–22, 2022–23, 2024–25
- Hwaebul Cup: 2015, 2016
- Man'gyŏngdae Prize: 2014, 2015, 2016, 2017
- Paektusan Prize: 2017
- AFC Cup: runner-up 2019

== Career statistics ==
=== International ===
As of match played 13 October 2018

Appearances and goals by national team and year
National team	Year	Apps	Goals
North Korea	2010	2	1
North Korea	2011	0	0
North Korea	2012	5	2
North Korea	2013	0	0
North Korea	2014	1	0
North Korea	2015	0	0
North Korea	2016	2	0
North Korea	2017	0	0
North Korea	2018	1	0
Total		11	4

No.	Date	Venue	Cap	Opponent	Score	Result	Competition
1.	2 November 2010	Mỹ Đình National Stadium, Hanoi, Vietnam	1	Singapore	2–1	2–1	Friendly
2.	6 November 2010	Mỹ Đình National Stadium, Hanoi, Vietnam	2	Vietnam	2–0	2–0	Friendly
3.	1 December 2012	Mong Kok, Hong Kong	4	Chinese Taipei	1–0	6–1	2013 EAFF East Asian Cup
4.	3 December 2012	Mong Kok, Hong Kong	5	Guam	1–0	5–0	2013 EAFF East Asian Cup
