= 2016 DPR Korea Football League =

DPR Korea Football League
- Season: 2016
- Champions: Kigwanch'a (6th title)
- 2017 AFC Cup: Kigwanch'a, April 25

Statistics of DPR Korea Football League in the 2016 season.

== Overview ==
The Highest Class Football League champions were Kigwanch'a, with April 25 and Amrokkang finishing second and third respectively.

Unusually, the competition was played with a play-off format to decide the championship. Ryŏmyŏng made their Highest Class League debut. Eight teams advanced to the quarter-finals; the only results known are that on 25 October Kigwancha beat Hwaebul 2–1, and Amrokkang defeated Sobaeksu 3–1; both these matches were played at Sŏsan Stadium in P'yŏngyang. It is known that April 25 won their quarter-final match, but their opponent is unknown, as is the match-up of the fourth quarter-final match; the semi-final matches are likewise unknown. Kigwancha went on to defeat April 25 in the final.

Sobaeksu player Kim Su-hyŏng was listed third on North Korea's list of top ten athletes of 2016, and Ryŏmyŏng manager Sin Jŏng-bŏk was listed fourth on the list of top ten managers (across all sports) in the same year.

== Cup Competitions ==
=== Hwaebul Cup ===
The 2016 edition of the Hwaebul Cup began on 27 July 2016 and held at Sŏsan Stadium, with thirteen teams participating: Amrokkang, April 25, Chebi, February 8, Hwaebul, Kyŏnggong'ŏp, Myohyangsan, Rimyŏngsu, Ryongaksan, Ryongnamsan, Sobaeksu, Sŏnbong, and Wŏlmido. The final was played on 28 August, in which April 25 defeated Hwaebul 3–2 on penalties, after extra time ended with the teams level at 2–2.

=== Man'gyŏngdae Prize ===
The 2016 edition of the Man'gyŏngdae Prize was won by Rimyŏngsu, who defeated Kigwanch'a in the final with a score of 1–0. The final was played at Kim Il-sung Stadium in P'yŏngyang.

=== Paektusan Prize ===
The 2016 edition of the Paektusan Prize was won by Hwaebul; Sobaeksu were the runners-up.

=== Poch'ŏnbo Torch Prize ===
The final of the 2016 edition of the Poch'ŏnbo Torch Prize, played at Kim Il-sung Stadium, saw Amrokkang defeat Sobaeksu 2–1.

=== Osandŏk Prize ===
The second competition for the Osandŏk Prize was held in December, with fourteen teams playing a group round-robin, followed by a knockout competition which was won by Hwaebul.

== Representatives at AFC club competitions ==
For the first time since Rimyŏngsu took part in the 2014 AFC President's Cup, two North Korean teams were selected to take part in the 2017 AFC Cup – Kigwanch'a and April 25, the first and second place finishers in the league.
