= Myong Cha-hyon =

North Korean footballer

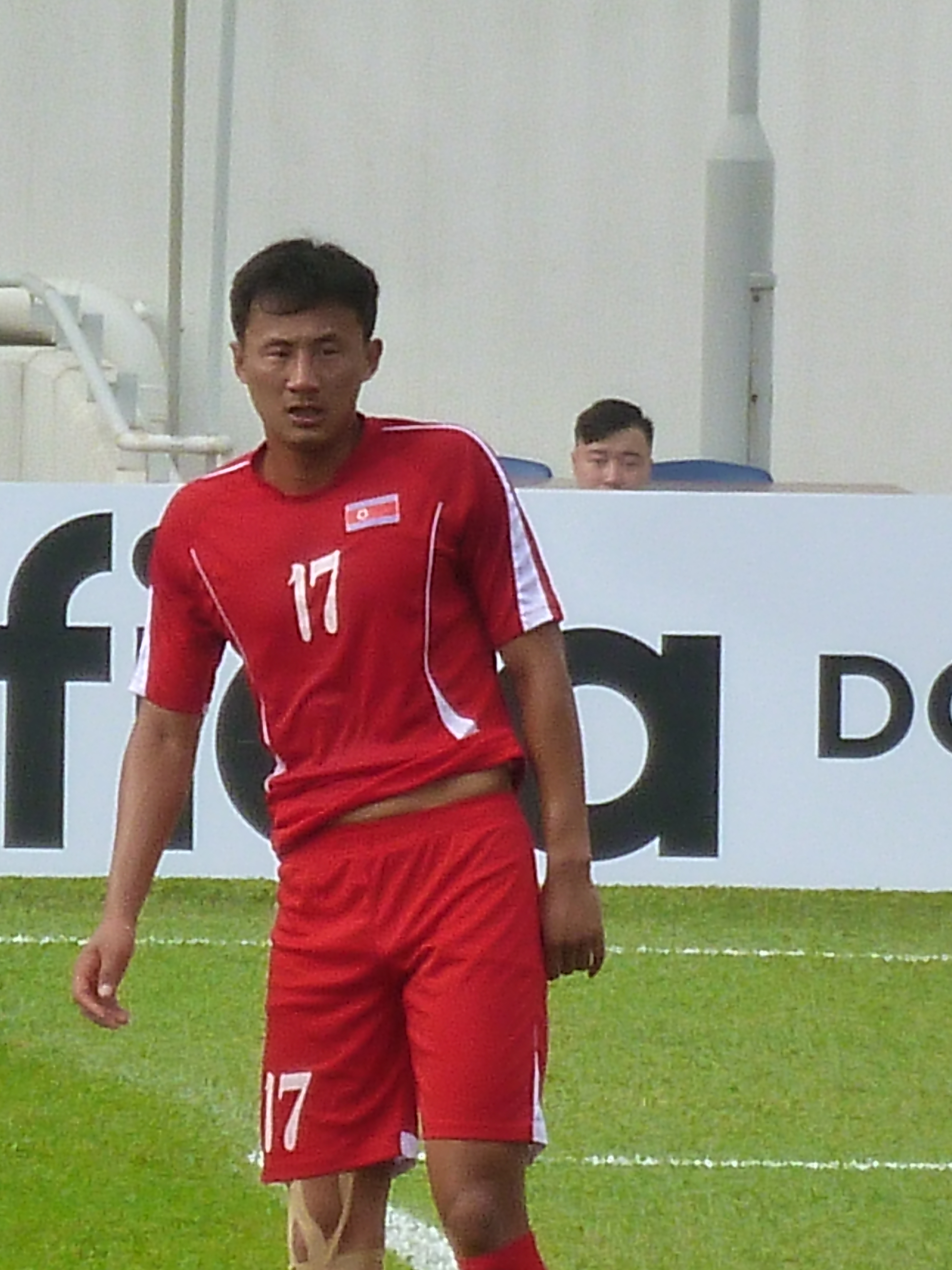
- Myong in 2016

Personal information
- Date of birth: 20 March 1990 (age 36)
- Place of birth: North Korea
- Height: 1.82 m (6 ft 0 in)
- Position: Midfielder

Team information
- Current team: April 25 Sports Club

Senior career*
| Years | Team | Apps | (Gls) |
| 2006–2009 | Sobaeksu | | |
| 2009–2010 | Radnički Kragujevac | 26 | (2) |
| 2010– | 25 April SC | | |

International career^{‡}
| 2007 | North Korea U17 | 4 | (0) |
| 2008 | North Korea U19 | | |
| 2010– | North Korea | 10 | (2) |
- * Club domestic league appearances and goals ‡ National team caps and goals as of 10 November 2017

- Myong Cha-hyon
- Hangul: 명차현
- Hanja: 明車鉉
- RR: Myeong Chahyeon
- MR: Myŏng Ch'ahyŏn

Myong Cha-hyon (born 20 March 1990) is a North Korean footballer who plays as a midfielder.

== Career ==
In summer 2009 together with other two players from Sobaeksu, An Il-bom and Ri Kwang-il, Myong moved to Serbia and signed a one-year contract with FK Radnički Kragujevac. They played in one of the Serbian third levels, the Serbian League West.

He has been a part of the North Korea national football team since 2010. By September 2016, besides the 3 official appearances and 2 goals, he also played one unofficial game in 2016.

He earlier had been part of the North Korea national under-17 football team at the 2007 FIFA U-17 World Cup where he played four games. Later, he was part of the North Korea national under-19 football team at the 2008 AFC U-19 Championship.

== Career statistics ==
Scores and results are list North Korea's goal tally first.

| No. | Date | Venue | Opponent | Score | Result | Competition |
|---|---|---|---|---|---|---|
| 1. | 24 August 2017 | Shanghai Stadium, Shanghai, China | United Arab Emirates | 2–0 | 2–0 | Friendly |
| 2. | 16 July 2017 | Rajamangala Stadium, Bangkok, Thailand | Burkina Faso | 2–1 | 3–3 (3–4 p) | 2017 King's Cup |

== Honours ==
Radnički Kragujevac

- Serbian League West: 2009–10

April 25

- DPR Korea Premier Football League: 2010, 2011, 2012, 2013, 2015, 2017, 2017–18, 2018-19
