= 2017–18 DPR Korea Premier Football League =

DPR Korea Premier League
- Season: 2017–18
- Champions: April 25 (18th title)
- 2019 AFC Cup: April 25; Ryŏmyŏng
- Matches: 156
- Goals: 382 (2.45 per match)
- Top goalscorer: An Il-bŏm (19)
- Best goalkeeper: An Tae-sŏng (13 cleen sheets)

The 2017–18 DPR Korea Premier Football League was the first season of the reformed DPR Korea Premier Football League, the top North Korean association football league, to use a home-and-away format. The league started on 1 December 2017 and will continue until 28 October 2018. Matches will be played on Saturdays and Sundays only.

April 25 are the defending champions.

== Teams ==
A total of 13 teams will participate:

Club	Location	Stadium	Affiliation
Amrokkang	P'yŏngyang	Yanggakdo Stadium	Ministry of People's Security
April 25	P'yŏngyang	Yanggakdo Stadium	Korean People's Army
Hwaebul	Pochŏn	Hwaebul Stadium	Kimilsungist-Kimjongilist Youth League
Jebi	P'yŏngyang	P'yŏngyang City Stadium	Korean People's Army Air Force
Kalmaegi			
Kigwancha	P'yŏngyang	Yanggakdo Stadium	Korean State Railway
Kyŏnggong'ŏpsong	P'yŏngyang	P'yŏngyang City Stadium	Ministry of Light Industry
P'yŏngyang	P'yŏngyang	Kim Il-sung Stadium	Workers' Party of Korea
Rimyŏngsu	Sariwŏn	Sariwŏn Youth Stadium	Ministry of People's Security
Ryŏmyŏng	P'yŏngyang	Kim Il-sung Stadium	Korean People's Army
Sobaeksu	P'yŏngyang	Yanggakdo Stadium	Korean People's Army
Sŏnbong	Rasŏn	Rajin Stadium	Worker-Peasant Red Guards
Wŏlmido	Kimch'aek	Kimch'aek Municipal Stadium	Ministry of Culture and Fine Arts

== Standings ==
Pos	Team	Pld	W	D	L	GF	GA	GD	Pts	Qualification
1	April 25 (C)	24	19	3	2	57	19	+38	60	Qualification for AFC Cup group stage
2	Ryŏmyŏng	24	17	6	1	46	20	+26	57	Qualification for AFC Cup preliminary round (Note: Ryŏmyŏng qualified for AFC Cup preliminary round as Hwaebul Cup winners.)
3	Kigwancha	24	13	7	4	30	18	+12	46	
4	Hwaebul	24	14	3	7	37	22	+15	45	
5	Rimyŏngsu	24	12	5	7	31	21	+10	41	
6	Amrokkang	24	11	7	6	30	18	+12	40	
7	Pyongyang City	24	7	8	9	23	26	−3	29	
8	Sŏbaeksu	24	7	4	13	24	28	−4	25	
9	Sŏnbong	24	5	7	12	28	35	−7	22	
10	Kalmaegi	24	6	4	14	18	36	−18	22	
11	Wŏlmido	24	6	2	16	25	46	−21	20	
12	Kyŏnggong'ŏpsong	24	3	7	14	18	46	−28	16	
13	Jebi	24	2	5	17	15	48	−33	11	

Updated to match(es) played on 17 November 2018. Source: https://www.rsssf.org/tablesn/nkor2018.html
Rules for classification: 1) points; 2) goal difference; 3) number of goals scored.
(C) Champions

== Results ==
Home \ Away	4.25	AMR	HWA	JEB	KAL	KIG	KYO	PYC	RIM	RYO	SOB	SON	WOL
April 25		2–1	1–1	2–1	4–1	2–0	6–0	0–0	2–1	2–2	1–0	2–0	6–0
Amrokkang	0–3		1–2	3–0	1–1	1–1	3–0	2–0	1–2	0–0	1–0	1–0	2–1
Hwaebul	0–2	1–0		2–0	1–0	3–0	1–0	1–0	2–0	0–1	2–4	2–2	1–0
Jebi	1–2	0–2	1–4		0–3	0–0	1–1	0–0	0–3	1–1	0–1	0–2	3–2
Kalmaegi	0–1	0–4	2–1	2–1		0–1	0–0	0–0	1–0	1–3	0–2	1–1	1–0
Kigwancha	3–1	1–1	1–0	2–0	2–0		1–0	0–1	1–1	2–2	1–0	2–0	1–0
Kyonggongop	0–2	1–1	2–3	2–1	3–1	1–2		1–2	0–4	0–2	2–2	1–1	0–2
Pyongyang City	0–4	0–1	1–3	3–3	2–0	1–2	2–0		0–1	2–1	0–1	0–1	1–1
Rimyongsu	0–1	0–0	2–1	2–0	2–1	1–1	2–1	1–1		1–2	2–1	2–1	0–1
Ryomyong	5–4	2–1	1–0	2–0	3–0	2–1	5–0	0–0	1–0		2–1	2–1	2–0
Sobaeksu	1–2	0–1	0–2	3–0	1–0	0–0	1–1	0–0	1–2	0–2		2–3	0–2
Sonbong	0–1	0–1	1–1	4–1	2–3	0–2	1–1	1–2	0–0	2–2	1–0		2–3
Wolmido	2–4	1–1	0–3	0–1	1–0	0–3	0–1	2–5	1–2	1–2	1–3	3–2	

Updated to match(es) played on 29 October 2018. Source: See Matches
Legend: Blue = home team win; Yellow = draw; Red = away team win.

== Awards ==
2017–18 Awards were given at 31 October 2018

- Most Valuable Player : Kim Yu-sŏng (April 25)
- Top scorer : An Il-bŏm (April 25)
- Best goalkeeper : An Tae-sŏng (April 25)

== See also ==
- DPRK Premier League at its height
- Wolmido beats Sobaeksu 2–0 in premier league
- Results of 2017–2018 DPRK Premier Football League
