= 2023–24 DPR Korea Premier Football League =

DPR Korea Premier League
- Season: 2023–24
- Dates: 5 December 2023 – 25 October 2024
- Champions: Ryomyong (2nd title); AFC Champions League Two: Failed to obtain mandatory license
- Matches: 66
- Goals: 180 (2.73 per match)
- Top goalscorer: Pak Kwang-chon (9+ goals)

The 2023–24 DPR Korea Premier Football League is the 64th season of the DPR Korea Premier League and the 2nd season since the reformation of the league's structure in the 2022–23 season. The season began on 5 December 2023 and concluded on 25 October 2024.

April 25 were the defending champions, while Ryomyong eventually won the 2023–24 season, securing the title after an impressive season.

There are twelve teams in this second season to operate in three phases after a structure reform for the 2022–23 season. It is not known how the three phases work although the first phase is suspected to operate in traditional league fashion with each team playing each other once. The first phase kicked off on 5 December 2023 and ended before 2 April 2024. The second round of fixtures for the second phase kicked off on 19 May 2024 and 20 May 2024.

== Prize-Awarding Ceremony ==
The prize-awarding ceremony took place at the Kim Il Sung Stadium on 25 October 2024. Trophies and medals were awarded to the teams and players that demonstrated high technical skills and sportsmanship throughout the season.

== Teams ==
Twelve teams are competing in the league. Jebi returned to the top division after winning promotion from the DPRK Football League 2. All matches are held at the Kim Il Sung Stadium.

Location football club of DPR Korea Premier Football League

Club	Location	Affiliation
Amnokgang	P'yŏngyang	Ministry of People's Security
April 25	P'yŏngyang	Korean People's Army
Hwaebul	Pochŏn	Kimilsungist-Kimjongilist Youth League
Jebi	P'yŏngyang	Korean People's Army Air Force
Kigwancha	Sinuiju	Korean State Railway
Kyonggongopsong	P'yŏngyang	Ministry of Light Industry
Pyongyang	P'yŏngyang	Workers' Party of Korea
Rimyongsu	Sariwŏn	Ministry of People's Security
Ryomyong	P'yŏngyang	Korean People's Army
Sobaeksu	P'yŏngyang	Korean People's Army
Sonbong	Rasŏn	Worker-Peasant Red Guards
Wolmido	Kimch'aek	Ministry of Culture and Fine Arts

== League table ==
=== Phase 1 ===
Note: The following table is compiled from known results reported in the news media, and may not align with the official table. Not all results have been reported.

As of the first stage, Ryomyong's captain Pak Kwang Chon was the league's top scorer with 9 goals.

Pos	Team	Pld	W	D	L	GF	GA	GD	Pts
1	April 25	11							25
2	Sobaeksu	11							22
3	Amnokgang	11	6	4	1				21
4		11							
5		11							
6		11							
7		11							
8		11							
9	Jebi	11							
10		11							
11		11							
12		11							9

=== Phase 2 ===
Pos	Team	Pld	W	D	L	GF	GA	GD	Pts
1	April 25								44
1	Sobaeksu								44
3	Ryomyong								42
4	Amnokgang								41
5									
6									
7									
8									
9									
10									
11									
12									
