= 2018–19 DPR Korea Premier Football League =

DPR Korea Premier League
- Season: 2018–19
- Champions: April 25 (19th title)
- Relegated: Kalmaegi
- AFC Cup: April 25 Sports Club
- Matches: 152
- Goals: 410 (2.7 per match)
- Top goalscorer: Rim Chŏl-min (21)
- Best goalkeeper: An Tae-sŏng (11 clean sheets)

The 2018–19 DPR Korea Premier Football League was the second season of the reformed DPR Korea Premier Football League, the top North Korean association football league, to use a home-and-away format.
The league started on 1 December 2018 and continued until October 2019.

April 25 are the defending champions. The winner, April 25, qualified for the 2020 AFC Cup.

== Teams ==
There was no promotion or relegation from the previous season. A total of 13 teams participate:

Club	Location	Stadium	Affiliation
Amrokkang	P'yŏngyang	Yanggakdo Stadium	Ministry of People's Security
April 25	P'yŏngyang	Yanggakdo Stadium	Korean People's Army
Hwaebul	Pochŏn	Hwaebul Stadium	Kimilsungist-Kimjongilist Youth League
Jebi	P'yŏngyang	P'yŏngyang City Stadium	Korean People's Army Air Force
Kalmaegi			
Kigwancha	P'yŏngyang	Yanggakdo Stadium	Korean State Railway
Kyŏnggong'ŏpsong	P'yŏngyang	P'yŏngyang City Stadium	Ministry of Light Industry
P'yŏngyang	P'yŏngyang	Kim Il-sung Stadium	Workers' Party of Korea
Rimyŏngsu	Sariwŏn	Sariwŏn Youth Stadium	Ministry of People's Security
Ryŏmyŏng	P'yŏngyang	Kim Il-sung Stadium	Korean People's Army
Sobaeksu	P'yŏngyang	Yanggakdo Stadium	Korean People's Army
Sŏnbong	Rasŏn	Rajin Stadium	Worker-Peasant Red Guards
Wŏlmido	Kimch'aek	Kimch'aek Municipal Stadium	Ministry of Culture and Fine Arts

== League table ==
Note: The following table is compiled from known results reported in the news media, and may not align with the official table.

Status of remaining 4 games is unknown, they could have been cancelled or played, but not reported.

After the end of the season, official media from DPRK stated that Kigwancha finished second, although according to previously reported results, they could only finish in 4th place (given that they played their last game and won). Also, despite Kyŏnggong'ŏpsong finishing bottom of the table, they remained in the top flight, while the second-to-last Kalmaegi were relegated for unknown reasons.

Pos	Team	Pld	W	D	L	GF	GA	GD	Pts	Qualification or relegation
1	April 25 (C)	21	19	2	0	64	14	+50	59	
2	Ryŏmyŏng	22	14	4	4	55	22	+33	46	
3	Sŏbaeksu	24	13	6	5	34	20	+14	45	
4	Amnokgang	24	11	4	9	31	28	+3	37	
5	Kigwancha	23	10	6	7	36	31	+5	36	
6	P'yŏngyang	24	7	9	8	34	32	+2	30	
7	Hwaebul	24	7	9	8	25	31	−6	30	
8	Rimyŏngsu	23	7	8	8	20	24	−4	29	
9	Sŏnbong	23	6	8	9	25	34	−9	26	
10	Jebi	24	5	7	12	20	40	−20	22	
11	Wŏlmido	24	6	4	14	22	45	−23	22	
12	Kalmaegi (R)	24	4	6	14	22	40	−18	18	Relegated to DPR Korea Football League 2
13	Kyŏnggong'ŏpsong	24	3	7	14	22	49	−27	16	

Source: Oball.ru
Rules for classification: 1) Points; 2) Goal difference; 3) Goals scored.
(C) Champions; (R) Relegated

== Awards ==
2018–19 Awards were given at 23 November 2019

- Most Valuable Player : O Hyŏk-chŏl (April 25)
- Top scorer : Rim Chŏl-min (April 25)
- Best goalkeeper : An Tae-sŏng (April 25)

== See also ==
- 2019 Hwaebul Cup
