= Ri Myong-guk =

North Korean footballer (born 1986)

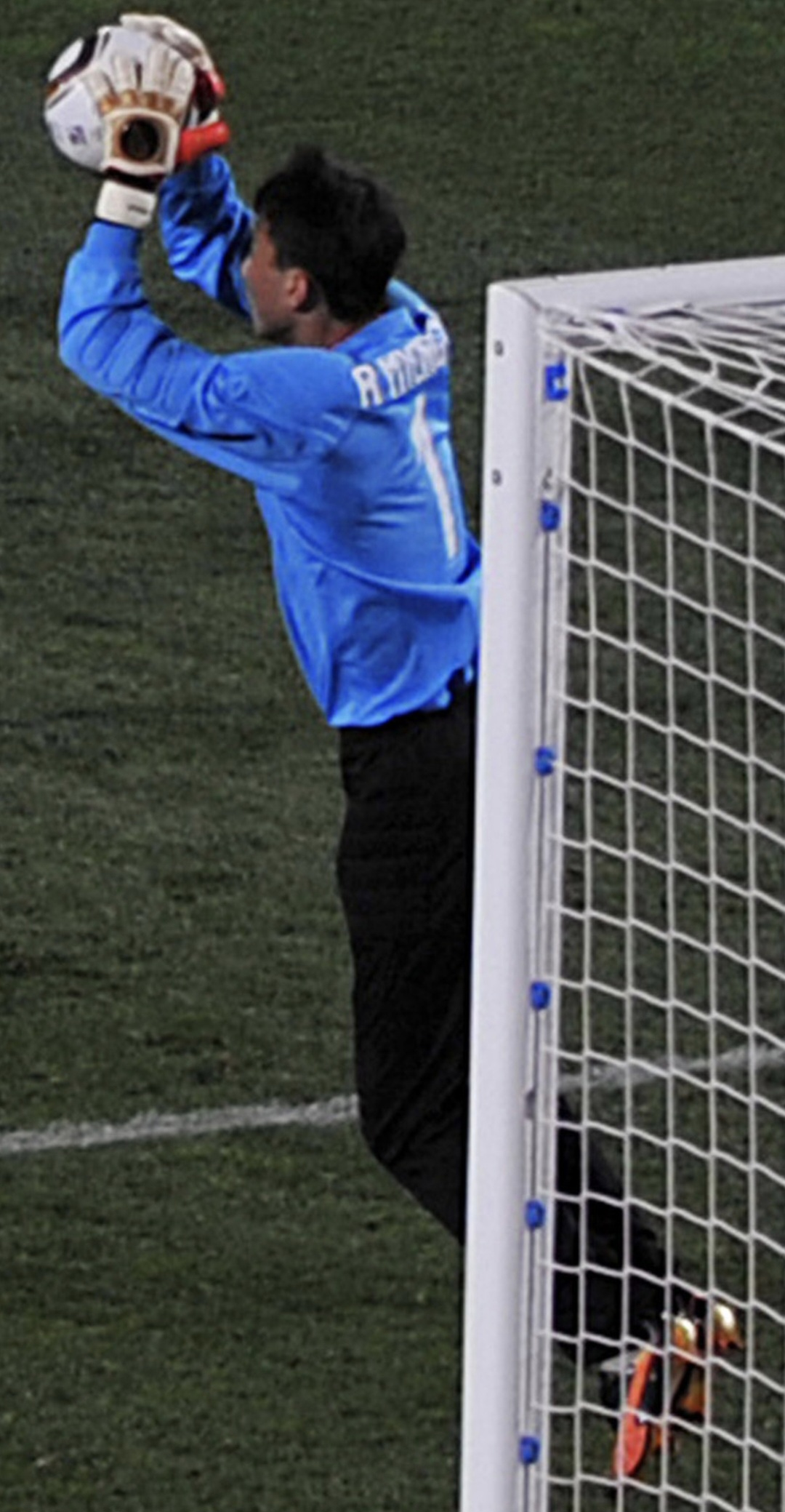
- Ri playing for North Korea at the 2010 FIFA World Cup

Personal information
- Date of birth: 9 September 1986 (age 40)
- Place of birth: Pyongyang, North Korea
- Height: 1.88 m (6 ft 2 in)
- Position: Goalkeeper

Team information
- Current team: Pyongyang City (goalkeeper coach)

Senior career*
Years	Team	Apps	(Gls)
2006–2019	Pyongyang City		

International career
2007–2019	North Korea	118	(0)
Medal record
Representing North Korea
Men's football
Asian Games
Silver medal – second place	2014 Incheon	Team
- * Club domestic league appearances and goals

- Ri Myong-guk
- Hangul: 리명국
- Hanja: 李明國
- RR: Ri Myeongguk
- MR: Ri Myŏngguk

Ri Myong-guk (born 9 September 1986) is a North Korean former professional footballer who played as a goalkeeper. Ri was known for his positioning and reflexes and spent his entire playing career at Pyongyang City in the DPR Korea Football League. Ri was also the captain of the North Korea national team, making 118 appearances, more than any other player in the team's history, before retiring in 2019. Ri is currently the goalkeeper coach for his former club.

== Club career ==
Ri Myong-guk played as a goalkeeper and he spent his entire club career with DPR Korea Football League club Pyongyang City; he played for the club between 2006 and 2019. With Pyongyang City, Ri won two DPR Korea Football League titles (2007, 2009), two Paektusan Prize titles (2007, 2016), and one Ponchonbo Torch Prize title (2014).

He retired from club football on 17 November 2019 upon the conclusion of the 2018–19 season.

== International career ==
Ri made 118 appearances for his national team between 2007 and 2019, making him the most capped player in the history of North Korea. He made his debut for North Korea on 24 June 2007 during a 2–1 friendly loss against Singapore.

Ri played 15 matches in 2010 World Cup qualifying for Korea DPR, including keeping a clean sheet in the decisive final group game against Saudi Arabia. After the match, he stated "I felt like I was defending the gateway to my motherland". His performances also saw him nominated for the 2009 Asian Footballer of the Year award.

Ri was North Korea's first choice in goal in for most of his career, and he played during all three of their 2010 FIFA World Cup matches including the 7–0 loss to Portugal. He would then go on to win the 2012 AFC Challenge Cup and also finished as runner-up in the 2014 Asian Games. His final medal came during the 2015 EAFF East Asian Cup where North Korea finished third. He also helped North Korea to qualify for three AFC Asian Cups: 2011, 2015, and 2019.

His last appearance for North Korea came on 17 January 2019 during the 4–1 loss against Lebanon during the 2019 AFC Asian Cup. He retired after North Korea were eliminated from the group stage of the tournament.

He was named North Korea's best male footballer for three years running, in 2014, 2015, and 2016.

== Coaching career ==
He became the goalkeeper coach at Pyongyang City after he retired in November 2019.

== Personal life ==
Both his father and uncle were goalkeepers for the North Korea national team.

== Honours ==
Pyongyang City

- DPR Korea Football League: 2007, 2009
- Paektusan Prize: 2007, 2016
- Ponchonbo Torch Prize: 2014, runner-up 2010

North Korea

- AFC Challenge Cup: 2012
- Asian Games runner-up: 2014
- EAFF Championship third place: 2015

Individual

- AFC Challenge Cup: 2012 Team of the tournament
- EAFF Championship Best Goalkeeper: 2008, 2015
- North Korea's Best Male Footballer: 2014, 2015, 2016

== See also ==
- List of men's footballers with 100 or more international caps
