= Han Kwang-song =

North Korean footballer (born 1998)

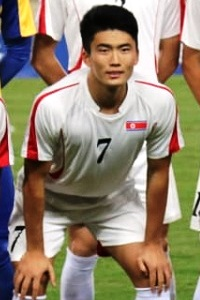
- Han with North Korea in 2019

Personal information
- Full name: Han Kwang-song
- Date of birth: 11 September 1998 (age 28)
- Place of birth: Pyongyang, North Korea
- Height: 1.78 m (5 ft 10 in)
- Position: Forward

Team information
- Current team: April 25

Youth career
- –2013: Chobyong
- 2013–2014: Marcet
- 2014–2015: Chobyong
- 2015–2017: ISM Academy
- 2017: Cagliari

Senior career*
Years	Team	Apps	(Gls)
2014	Tecnofútbol CF	14	(3)
2017–2020	Cagliari	12	(1)
2017–2018	→ Perugia (loan)	17	(7)
2018–2019	→ Perugia (loan)	19	(4)
2019–2020	→ Juventus (loan)	0	(0)
2019–2020	→ Juventus U23 (res.)	17	(0)
2020	Juventus	0	(0)
2020–2021	Al-Duhail	10	(3)
2023–	April 25		

International career^{‡}
2013–2014	North Korea U16	8	(6)
2015	North Korea U17	4	(0)
2016	North Korea U19	3	(1)
2017–	North Korea	21	(2)
Korean name
Hangul	한광성
Hanja	韓光成
RR	Han Gwangseong
MR	Han Kwangsŏng
- * Club domestic league appearances and goals as of 21 August 2020 ‡ National team caps and goals as of 3 April 2025

Han Kwang-song (Korean: 한광성; Korean pronunciation: [han.ɡwaŋ.sʌŋ] born 11 September 1998) is a North Korean professional footballer who plays as a forward for DPRK Premier League club April 25 and the North Korea national team.

Han signed with Italian side Cagliari in 2017, becoming the first North Korean to play in Serie A. He made an immediate impact, scoring on his debut and earning a professional contract. Han later went on loan to Perugia and Juventus U23, before transferring to Qatari club Al-Duhail in 2020. However, due to UN sanctions, his contract was terminated in 2021, and he returned to North Korea in 2023, joining domestic club April 25.

With the North Korea U-16 team, Han won the 2014 AFC U-16 Championship, scoring four goals, including the equalizer in the final against South Korea. He made his senior debut in 2017 and played a key role in North Korea's qualification for the 2019 AFC Asian Cup. Han scored his first senior international goal in a 2022 World Cup qualifier against Turkmenistan. Due to COVID-19 restrictions, North Korea did not play any matches from 2021 until 2023, when Han returned to the national team for the 2026 World Cup qualifiers.

Han's career has been significantly impacted by North Korean government and international sanctions. Allegations surfaced that a portion of his salary was sent to the North Korean government, though his contract with Al-Duhail reportedly prevented this. UN sanctions against North Korea barred Han from working abroad, leading to the termination of his contract in 2021. Stranded in China due to COVID-19 restrictions, Han spent years training alone at the North Korean embassy before returning to international football in 2023.

== Early life ==
Han Kwang-song was born on 11 September 1998 in Pyongyang, North Korea. He developed an early interest in football and attended the Pyongyang International Football School, a government-sponsored academy that trains young athletes and facilitates opportunities for overseas training. In 2013, as part of the North Korean U-16 national team, Han traveled to Europe for a training tour, including a stint at the Marcet in Barcelona, where he prepared for the 2014 AFC U-16 Championship.

In 2014, Han returned to North Korea at Chobyong Sports Club before moving to Italy, joining ISM Academy in Perugia under a student visa. Due to FIFA regulations regarding underage players, he could not register with any Italian club at the time and focused on training and learning Italian. During this period, he was mentored by Mauro Costorella, a coach at the academy, who provided guidance and support.

By 2017, Han attracted interest from European clubs, including Liverpool and Manchester City. After a meeting with Liverpool's chief scout, Barry Hunter, Han declined their offer and instead accepted an eight-week trial with Italian side Cagliari, advised by his agent and the ISM Academy's sports director.

== Club career ==
=== Cagliari ===
==== 2017: Debut year ====
On 10 March 2017, Han signed a contract with Cagliari on youth terms, joining their Primavera 2 squad in the process. This signing made him the first Asian and North Korean player to play for Cagliari. Additionally, Han became the second North Korean player to join a Serie A club, following in the footsteps of Choe Song-hyok who had signed with Fiorentina the year prior.

Initially, Han started earning the minimum federal income for training, which amounted to €1,500 per month and was required to go to Han's personal bank account. Concerns were raised by the Italian Parliament regarding the destination of this money, as there were suspicions that a significant portion of the salaries of North Korean workers abroad was funnelled directly to the North Korean regime. However, no action was taken in Han's case at the time.

On his first day after arriving at Cagliari, he scored a hat-trick in a friendly training match, impressing the coaching staff who decided to promote him to the first team. Han went on to make three more appearances for the under-19 side in the Torneo di Viareggio before finally making his full debut on 2 April. He featured for the final four minutes of a 3–1 victory over Palermo, becoming the first North Korean player to compete in Serie A. A week later, in his second appearance, Han scored his first goal for the club, netting a 95th-minute goal past Joe Hart in a 3–2 away defeat to Torino; he became the first North Korean to score in Serie A. His impressive start in the first team led to a renewal four days later, earning his first professional contract with Cagliari until 2022, that was set to commence on 1 July 2017.

==== 2017–2020: Loans to Perugia and Juventus ====
On 7 August 2017, he was loaned to Serie B team Perugia. He debuted for the club in the Coppa Italia third-round game against Benevento, which Perugia won 4–0. On 27 August 2017, Han scored a hat-trick on his Serie B debut for Perugia in a 5–1 win over Virtus Entella. Han scored seven league goals for Perugia in 17 games during the 2017–18 season, before returning to Cagliari on 1 February 2018.

Han's first game as a starter for Cagliari, and in Serie A, came on 26 February in a 5–0 home defeat against Napoli. He played seven league games in the 2017–18 season. On 15 August 2018, Han joined on loan to Perugia for a second time. Initially unable to play due to an injury, Han scored his first seasonal goal against Ascoli in a 3–0 away win. He ended the 2018–19 season with four goals in 20 league games.

On 2 September 2019, Han secured a deadline-day move to Juventus on a two-year loan from Cagliari, with an obligation to purchase at the end of the term. The Serie A champions moved him to their reserve team playing in Serie C: Juventus U23. On 26 October, Han was called-up to the first team for the Serie A game against Lecce, becoming the first player from Asia to do so for Juventus. On 6 November, he converted a penalty to beat Alessandria 1–0 in a Coppa Italia Serie C match. That was his lone goal for Juventus U23 with the addition of two assists in 20 matches.

=== Al-Duhail ===
On 2 January 2020, Juventus bought Han from Cagliari for €3.5 million, before selling him to Qatari side Al-Duhail six days later for €7 million. He made his debut for Al-Duhail in the Qatar Cup semi-finals on 10 January, in a 2–0 win over Al-Sailiya, coming on as a substitute for Edmilson Junior in the 83rd minute. He lost the final 4–0 to Al Sadd seven days later. Han made his Qatar Stars League debut on 24 January, in a 3–1 win over Al-Arabi.

Han's first goals for Al-Duhail came on 6 February, scoring a brace against Muaither in the Emir of Qatar Cup quarter-finals; his side won 4–0. On 11 February, Han debuted in the Asian Champions League against Persepolis, helping his side win 2–0. Han's first league goal came on 22 February, scoring the maiden goal of the match against Al-Wakrah. He scored in the following two consecutive games, on 27 February and 7 March, against Al-Shahania and Al-Sailiya respectively.

Han scored five goals in 14 domestic games, helping his side win the Qatar Stars League. He also played in two Asian Champions League games. Despite Han signing a contract with a Qatari bank that prevented him from sending money to North Korea, Al-Duhail was forced to terminate his contract in 2021 due to sanctions against North Korea preventing North Koreans from working abroad.

=== April 25 ===
Due to COVID-19 travel restrictions, Han was reportedly unable to return to North Korea in 2021 and spent approximately two to three years stranded at the North Korean embassy in China. During this time Han trained alone to maintain his fitness and skills.

On 19 March 2024, the Japanese newspaper Choson Sinbo revealed that Han was playing at DPRK Premier League club April 25.

== International career ==
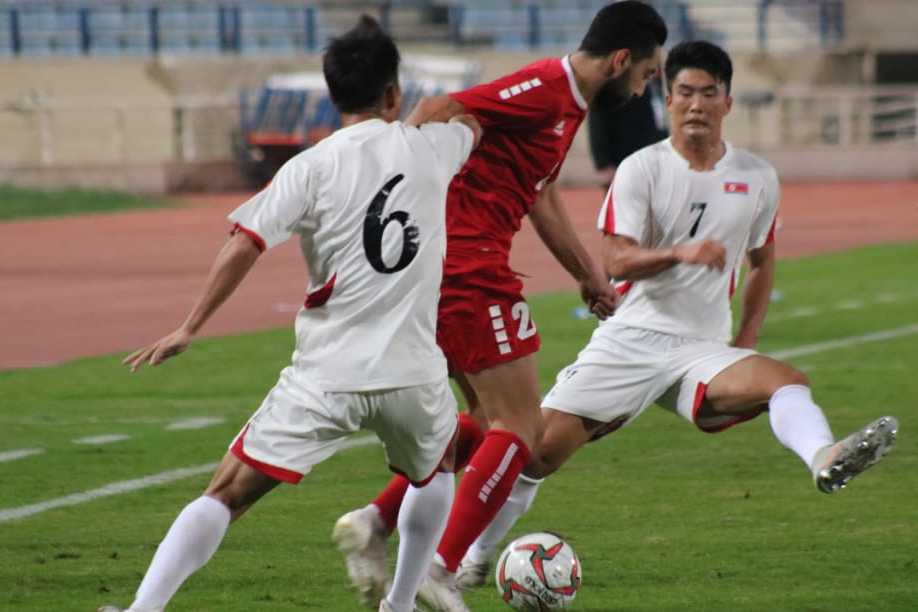
Han (right) with North Korea against Lebanon at the 2022 FIFA World Cup qualifiers

With the North Korea U16, Han won the AFC U-16 Championship held in Thailand in September 2014. He scored four goals in the competition, including the equaliser in the final which North Korea won 2–1 against rivals South Korea.

On 6 June 2017, Han made his senior debut for North Korea, in a friendly against Qatar. He played in the 2019 AFC Asian Cup qualifiers, helping North Korea qualify to the final tournament. Han was called up for the final squad, playing against Saudi Arabia – against whom he was sent off – and Lebanon in the group stage. His first international goal came on 14 November 2019, in a 2022 FIFA World Cup qualification match against Turkmenistan.

Due to the COVID-19 restrictions in North Korea, their national team did not play a match after the 2022 World Cup qualifiers until the 2026 qualifiers in 2023. Han started in his nation's first game in a 1–0 loss against Syria. He scored a goal and provided an assist in a 6–1 win over Myanmar in the second game of qualifiers.

== Style of play ==
An ambidextrous player, Han's main characteristics are his dribbling, eye for goal and vision of the game.

== Issues relating to North Korean sanctions ==
Han's career has been heavily influenced by the politics of the North Korean government and international sanctions. He is unable to give interviews, and it was previously alleged that most of his salary was sent to the North Korean government. However, his contract with Al-Duhail reportedly prevented him from sending money to North Korea. Due to United Nations (UN) sanctions, which prohibit North Korean citizens from working abroad due to the country's nuclear programme, Han has been unable to play overseas since 2021. His transfer from Juventus to Al-Duhail in 2020 was deemed a violation of these sanctions, leading to the termination of his contract in 2021.

Unable to return to North Korea due to COVID-19 restrictions, Han reportedly spent two to three years stranded at the North Korean embassy in China, training alone, according to former North Korean international An Yong-hak. He had last been seen on 20 August 2020. He later represented North Korea in a 2026 World Cup qualifier against Syria in 2023 after the restrictions were lifted, marking the country's first international match in years.

== Career statistics ==
=== Club ===
As of match played 21 August 2020

Club	Season	League			National cup (Note: Includes the Coppa Italia and the Emir of Qatar Cup)		Continental		Other		Total	
Club	Season	Division	Apps	Goals	Apps	Goals	Apps	Goals	Apps	Goals	Apps	Goals
Tecnofútbol	2013–14	Primera Catalana	14	3	—		—		—		14	3
Cagliari	2016–17	Serie A	5	1	0	0	—		—		5	1
Cagliari	2017–18	Serie A	7	0	0	0	—		—		7	0
Cagliari	Total		12	1	0	0	—		—		12	1
Perugia (loan)	2017–18	Serie B	17	7	2	0	—		—		19	7
Perugia (loan)	2018–19	Serie B	19	4	0	0	—		1 (Note: Appearance(s) in the Serie B promotion play-offs)	0	20	4
Perugia (loan)	Total		36	11	2	0	—		1	0	39	11
Juventus U23	2019–20	Serie C	17	0	—		—		3 (Note: Appearance(s) in the Coppa Italia Serie C)	1	20	1
Al-Duhail	2019–20	Qatar Stars League	10	3	2	2	2 (Note: Appearances in the AFC Champions League)	0	2 (Note: Appearance(s) in the Qatar Cup)	0	16	5
Career total			89	18	4	2	2	0	6	1	101	21

=== International ===
As of match played 11 November 2024

National team	Year	Apps	Goals
North Korea	2017	2	0
North Korea	2018	1	0
North Korea	2019	7	1
North Korea	2023	2	1
North Korea	2024	9	0
Total		21	2

As of goal scored on 15 October 2024
Scores and results list Han's goal tally first, score column indicates score after each North Korea goal.

List of international goals scored by Han Kwang-Song
No.	Date	Venue	Opponent	Score	Result	Competition	Ref.
1	14 November 2019	Köpetdag Stadium, Ashgabat, Turkmenistan	Turkmenistan	1–3	1–3	2022 FIFA World Cup qualification	
2	21 November 2023	Thuwunna Stadium, Yangon, Myanmar	Myanmar	3–0	6–1	2026 FIFA World Cup qualification	

== Honours ==
Al-Duhail

- Qatar Stars League: 2019–20
- Qatar Cup runner-up: 2020

April 25

- DPR Korea Premier League: 2024–25; runner-up: 2023–24

North Korea U16

- AFC U-16 Championship: 2014
