= 2024–25 DPR Korea Premier Football League =

DPR Korea Premier League
- Season: 2024–25
- Dates: 1 December 2024 – November 2025
- Country: North Korea
- Champions: April 25 (23rd title)
- Challenge League: None (Failed to obtain mandatory AFC license)
- Matches: 66
- Goals: 175 (2.65 per match)
- Best Player: Choe Song-hyok
- Top goalscorer: Pak Kwang-chon
- Best goalkeeper: Kim Ryong-ik

The 2024–25 DPR Korea Premier Football League is the 65th season of DPR Korea Premier Football League, the top-flight football competition in North Korea and the third season since the reformation of the league's structure in 2022–23. The season began on 1 December 2024 and concluded in November 2025.

The defending champions were Ryomyong, while April 25 won the 2024–25 season.

In the previous 2023–24 edition, Kyonggongopsong was relegated from the DPR Korea Premier League, while Paekkumsan was promoted to the 2024–25 season from the second tier.

The competition is divided into three stages. The first stage began on 1 December 2024, with matches played at Kim Il Sung Stadium and Sosan Stadium.

After the first stage, April 25 led the standings, with Sobaeksu and Ryomyong emerging as their toughest rivals.

Throughout the season, several teams also competed in other competitions such as the 14th People's Games.

== Prize-awarding ceremony ==
The prize-awarding ceremony for the 2024–25 DPR Korea Premier Football League took place at Kim Il Sung Stadium in Pyongyang on a Sunday in November 2025. Cups and medals were presented to the men's and women's football teams and players who performed successfully and displayed high skill and noble moral traits throughout the season.

The April 25 team won the men's premier football league, followed by the Sobaeksu team and the Ryomyong team in second and third place, respectively.

Individual honours were also awarded: the Best Player Prize went to Choe Song-hyok of April 25, the Excellent Player Prize to Ri Ju-yong of Sobaeksu, and the Top Scorer award went to Pak Kwang-chon of Ryomyong. Kim Ryong-ik of Sobaeksu received the Best Goalkeeper Prize, while Paekkumsan was given the Fair Play Award.

== Teams ==
The twelve teams participating in the 2024–25 men's competition are:

- April 25 (Pyongyang)
- Ryomyong (Pyongyang)
- Sobaeksu (Pyongyang)
- Sonbong (Rason)
- Wolmido (Kimch’aek)
- Amrokkang (Pyongyang)
- Jebi (Pyongyang)
- Rimyongsu (Sariwon)
- Pyongyang (Pyongyang)
- Kigwancha (Sinuiju)
- Hwaebul (Pochon County, Pochŏn)
- Paekkumsan (Paekkŭmsan-dong, Tanch'ŏn)

== Results ==
=== First round ===
1 December 2024 First round	April 25	1–1	Ryomyong	Pyongyang
				Stadium: Sosan Stadium

1 December 2024 First round	Sonbong	5–0	Wolmido	Pyongyang
				Stadium: Sosan Stadium

Unknown First round	Kigwancha	1–1	Hwaebul	Pyongyang
				Stadium: Unknown

=== Second round ===
15 April 2025 Second round	April 25	2–0	Sobaeksu	Pyongyang
				Stadium: Kim Il Sung Stadium

Unknown Second round	Sŏnbong	3–0	Amnokgang	Pyongyang
				Stadium: Unknown

Unknown Second round	Jebi	2–1	Ryŏmyŏng	Pyongyang
				Stadium: Unknown

Unknown Second round	Kigwancha	2–0	Hwaebul	Pyongyang
				Stadium: Unknown

The third round of matches in the DPRK Premier League took place, with the following results:

=== Third round ===
Unknown Third round	Kigwancha	1–1	Hwaebul	Pyongyang
				Stadium: Unknown

Unknown Third round	Ryomyong	0–0	Sonbong	Pyongyang
				Stadium: Unknown

=== Standings ===
Note: The following table is compiled from known results reported in the news media, and may not align with the official table. Not all results have been reported.

As of 8 April 2025.

Second-stage standings (incomplete)
Pos	Team	Pld	W	D	L	GF	GA	GD	Pts
1	April 25	22	–	–	–	–	–	–	–
2	Sobaeksu	22	–	–	–	–	–	–	–
3	Wolmido	22	6	3	2	–	–	–	21
4	Pyongyang	22	6	3	2	–	–	–	21
5	Kigwancha	22	–	–	–	–	–	–	–
6	Amnokgang	22	–	–	–	–	–	–	–
7	?	22	–	–	–	–	–	–	–
8	?	22	–	–	–	–	–	–	–
9	?	22	–	–	–	–	–	–	–
10	?	22	–	–	–	–	–	–	–
11	?	22	–	–	–	–	–	–	–
12	?	22	–	–	–	–	–	–	–
