= 2010 DPR Korea Football League =

DPR Korea Football League
- Season: 2010

Statistics of DPR Korea Football League in the 2010 season.

== Highest Class Football League ==
From this season, The name of league changed to Highest Class Football League (Chosŏn'gŭl: 최상급축구련맹전; Hanja: 最上級蹴球聯盟戰).

=== Clubs ===
- April 25
- Amrokkang
- Ponghwasan
- Ch'ilbosan
- Kyŏnggong'ŏp
- Kigwanch'a
- Man'gyŏngbong
- P'yŏngyang City
- Rimyŏngsu
- Sobaeksu

== Cup competitions ==
Man'gyŏngbong won the Republican Championship. Sobaeksu won the first known edition of the Poch'ŏnbo Torch Prize, with P'yŏngyang City being the runners-up, and Rimyŏngsu won the Man'gyŏngdae Prize.
