= 2009 DPR Korea Football League =

DPR Korea Football League
- Season: 2009
- Champions: P'yŏngyang City
- Relegated: Chadongch'a, Wŏlmido

Statistics of DPR Korea Football League in the 2009 season.

== Overview ==
P'yŏngyang City won the championship. Chadongch'a and Wŏlmido were relegated to the 2nd level.

== Clubs ==
The football clubs in the season were as follows:

- April 25 (Namp'o)
- Amrokkang (P'yŏngyang)
- Ch'ilbosan
- Chadongch'a (Ch'ŏngjin)
- Kigwanch'a (Sinŭiju)
- P'yŏngyang City (P'yŏngyang)
- Rimyŏngsu (Sariwŏn)
- Sobaeksu (P'yŏngyang)
- Wŏlmido (Kimch'aek)

== Cup competitions ==
April 25 won the seventh edition of the Man'gyŏngdae Prize, whilst second division side Kyŏnggong'ŏp defeated Amrokkang 1-0 to win the Republican Championship.
