= 2019 Hwaebul Cup =

Tournament details
- Country: North Korea
- Teams: 12

Final positions
- Champions: Ryŏmyŏng (2nd title)
- Runners-up: P'yŏngyang City
- Third place: Amrokkang
- Fourth place: Hwaebul

The 2019 Hwaebul Cup was the seventh edition of the Hwaebul Cup (홰불, Torch) football competition celebrating North Korea's Youth Day.

Ryŏmyŏng were the defending champions. The winner, Ryŏmyŏng, qualified for the 2020 AFC Cup.

== Group stage ==
The 12 teams were divided into two groups. The group winners and runners-up advanced to the semi-finals.

In Group A, Ryŏmyŏng finished first with five wins and one draw, and Amrokkang finished second with three wins, one draw and two defeats.

In Group B, P'yŏngyang City finished first with four wins and one draw, and Hwaebul finished second with three wins, one draw and one defeat.

== Knockout stage ==
=== Semi-finals ===
25 August 2019

Ryŏmyŏng	2–1	Hwaebul

25 August 2019

P'yŏngyang City	?–? (won by P'yŏngyang City)	Amrokkang

=== Third place match ===
28 August 2019

Hwaebul	0–3	Amrokkang

Sosan Stadium, Pyongyang

=== Final ===
28 August 2019

Ryŏmyŏng	4–1	P'yŏngyang City

Sosan Stadium, Pyongyang

== See also ==
- 2018–19 DPR Korea Premier Football League
