= 2011 DPR Korea Football League =

DPR Korea Football League
- Season: 2011
- Champions: April 25

Statistics of DPR Korea Football League for the 2011 season.

== Overview ==
The championship was played over six rounds, after which the top four teams – April 25, Kigwanch'a, Sobaeksu, and Amrokkang – played a final tournament in P'yŏngyang in November 2011, which was won by April 25.

== Final standings ==
Team	Pld	W	D	L	GF	GA	GD	Pts
April 25	3	2	1	0	4	1	+3	7
Sobaeksu	3	1	1	1	3	3	0	4
Amrokkang	3	0	2	1	1	2	−1	2
Kigwanch'a	3	0	2	1	0	2	−2	2

== Clubs ==
- 4.25 (Namp'o)
- Amrokkang (P'yŏngyang)
- Ponghwasan
- Kyŏnggong'ŏp
- Kigwanch'a (Sinŭiju)
- Maebong
- Man'gyŏngbong (P'yŏngyang)
- P'yōngyang City Sports Club (P'yŏngyang)
- Rimyŏngsu (Sariwŏn)
- Ryongnamsan
- Sobaeksu (P'yŏngyang)
