= Chobyong Sports Club =

Association football club from South Korea

Chobyong Sports Club (Korean: 초병체육단) is an association football club from North Korea.

Chobyong are believed to be an academy team, bringing through and selling many players to clubs in North Korea and Europe, such as Han Kwang-song and Choe Song-hyok.

It is unknown what league Chobyong play in, but it is not the DPR Korea League, which they were promoted to, and presumably relegated from in 2015.
