= Jong Kum-song =

North Korean footballer (born 1997)

Personal information
- Date of birth: 24 January 1997 (age 29)
- Place of birth: Pyongyang, North Korea
- Height: 1.85 m (6 ft 1 in)
- Position: Striker

Team information
- Current team: Rimyongsu
- Number: 3

Senior career*
Years	Team	Apps	(Gls)
2019-	Rimyongsu		

International career^{‡}
2017–2019	North Korea U22	12	(2)
2023–	North Korea	6	(0)
- * Club domestic league appearances and goals ‡ National team caps and goals as of 5 December 2024

Jong Kum-song (Korean: 정금송; born 24 January 1997) is a North Korean professional footballer who plays as a striker for Rimyongsu. He has made six appearances for the North Korea national team.

In 2026, he was named as the captain of Rimyongsu.
