= 2021–22 DPR Korea Premier Football League =

DPR Korea Premier League
- Season: 2021–22
- Champions: April 25; AFC Cup: Failed to obtain mandatory license
- Top goalscorer: Choi Ju-song (Amnokgang)
- Best goalkeeper: Yu Kwang-jun (Ryomyong)
- Highest scoring: 61

The 2021–22 DPR Korea Premier Football League was the 62nd season of the reformed DPR Korea Premier Football League, the top North Korean association football league, to use a home-and-away format.
The league ended with an awarding ceremony on October 27, 2022.

The 2021–22 DPR Korea Premier Football League was the 62nd season of the reformed DPR Korea Premier Football League, the top North Korean association football league, to use a home-and-away format.
The league ended with an awarding ceremony on October 27, 2022.
