= 1995 DPR Korea Football League =

DPR Korea Football League
- Season: 1995

Statistics of DPR Korea Football League in the 1995 season.

== Overview ==
April 25 Sports Club won the championship.

== League standings ==
Pos	Team	Pld	W	D	L	GF	GA	GD	Pts
1	4.25 (C)	28	21	5	2	59	17	+42	68
2	Rimyŏngsu	28	18	4	6	45	25	+20	58
3	Kigwanch'a	28	10	10	8	23	21	+2	40
4	Pyongyang City	28	11	7	10	33	35	−2	40
5	Amrokkang	28	10	9	9	32	26	+6	39
6	Wŏlmido	28	4	10	14	22	37	−15	22
7	Chadongch'a	28	5	7	16	27	43	−16	22
8	Sports University	28	4	6	18	19	56	−37	18

(C) Champions
