= 2007 DPR Korea Football League =

DPR Korea Football League
- Season: 2007
- Dates: 22 February 2007 – after 19 May 2007
- Champions: P'yŏngyang City (4th title)

Statistics of DPR Korea Football League in the 2007 season. The 2007 edition of the Technical Innovation Contest was played with teams in two groups, with the first and second-place finishers in each group advancing to an elimination stage.

In the semi-finals, P'yŏngyang City defeated Kigwanch'a 2–1, and Amrokkang defeated Kyŏnggong'ŏp. In the final, P'yŏngyang City defeated Amrokkang 2–0, and Kyŏnggong'ŏp defeated Kigwanch'a 3–1 in the third place match.

== Final round ==
The final round began on 19 May 2007, while the following teams qualified for the final round:

- Amrokgang
- April 25
- Kigwanch'a
- Kyŏnggong'ŏp
- P'yŏngyang City
- Sobaeksu

=== Knockout phase ===
May 2007 Semi-finals	P'yŏngyang City	2–1	Kigwanch'a	North Korea

May 2007 Semi-finals	Amrokkang	–	Kyŏnggong'ŏp	North Korea

May 2007 Third place play-off	Kyŏnggong'ŏp	3–1	Kigwanch'a	North Korea

May? 2007 Final	P'yŏngyang City	2–0	Amrokkang	North Korea
