= Choe Song-hyok =

North Korean footballer (born 1998)

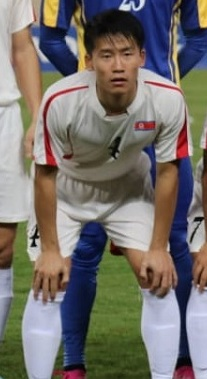
- Choe in 2019

Personal information
- Full name: Choe Song-hyok
- Date of birth: 8 February 1998 (age 28)
- Place of birth: Pyongyang, North Korea
- Height: 1.76 m (5 ft 9 in)
- Position: Winger

Team information
- Current team: April 25
- Number: 19

Youth career
- –2016: Chobyong
- 2016: Fiorentina

Senior career*
Years	Team	Apps	(Gls)
2017–2018	Perugia	0	(0)
2018	→ Olbia (loan)	5	(0)
2018–2020	Arezzo	2	(0)
2023-2026	April 25		

International career^{‡}
2014	North Korea U16		(4)
2015	North Korea U17	4	(0)
2016	North Korea U19	2	(0)
2018	North Korea U23	2	(0)
2018–	North Korea	4	(0)
- * Club domestic league appearances and goals as of 19 November 2019 ‡ National team caps and goals as of 13 April 2026

- Choe Song-hyok
- Hangul: 최성혁
- RR: Choe Seonghyeok
- MR: Ch'oe Sŏnghyŏk

Choe Song-hyok (Korean: 최성혁, born 8 February 1998) is a North Korean professional footballer who plays as a winger for April 25 and the North Korean national team.

== Club career ==
=== Youth career ===
Choe started out with Chobyong, a North Korean academy known for developing young talent. Choe signed with Italian club Fiorentina in February 2016, joining the Primavera (under-19) squad. On March 5, he made his debut for Fiorentina Primavera, during a 4–2 victory over Virtus Entella U19. In doing so, he became the first North Korean footballer to ever make an appearance for an Italian club at any level.

However, problems related to his nationality quickly began arising, and he only made three more appearances with the team. It was reported that the North Korean regime had placed strict restrictions on him during his time abroad. In addition to them keeping his travel documents, he was not allowed to use the internet, nor have relations with the media or teammates, unless directly related to football. Additionally, it was rumored that his signing bonus and 70% of his future salary would be repatriated to his home country. For this reason, in May, the Italian Parliament requested that the government review the contract. The following month, Fiorentina decided to terminate his contract. Choe took the matter to court, and the Italian Football Federation ruled that the club was obligated to continue honoring the contract. Subsequently, Fiorentina appealed to the Court of Arbitration for Sport, arguing that the contract should be invalidated because they were not aware that it violated international sanctions at the time of its signing.

=== Professional career ===
In July 2017, Choe signed a three-year deal with Serie B side Perugia.

After only two appearances with the club (both with the under-19 squad), Choe was loaned out to fellow Serie C side Olbia in January 2018. He made his long-awaited professional debut on February 25, replacing Roberto Biancu in the late minutes of a 1–0 defeat to Robur Siena.

On 13 July 2018, he signed with another Serie C club Arezzo. He made just 2 appearances in the league (16 minutes of field time) in the next 1.5-years, and on 31 January 2020, his Arezzo contract was terminated by mutual consent.

In April 2025, The Pyongyang Times reported that Choe is playing for April 25. He helped April 25 win the 2024–25 DPR Korea Premier Football League and was therefore given the league's Best player award.

== International career ==
Choe gained prominence by leading the North Korea U16s to a first-place finish at the 2014 AFC U-16 Championship, scoring the game-winning strike against South Korea in the final.

Choe was also named to the North Korea U17 squad at the 2015 FIFA U-17 World Cup, where he made four appearances. However, North Korea was knocked out in the round of 16 by Mali.

He earned two caps for the national under-19 team at the 2016 AFC U-19 Championship, and two more at the 2018 AFC U-23 Championship.

Choe made his debut for the senior national squad on 25 December 2018 in a friendly against Vietnam.

== Honours ==
April 25

- DPR Korea Premier Football League: 2024–25

North Korea U16

- AFC U-16 Championship: 2014

Individual

- DPR Korea Premier Football League Best player: 2024–25
