= 2006 DPR Korea Football League =

DPR Korea Football League
- Season: 2006

Statistics of DPR Korea Football League in the 2006 season.

== Overview ==
Amrokkang won the championship; Kigwanch'a finished in third place, and Kyŏnggong'ŏp finished 6th. 4.25, Rimyŏngsu, P'yŏngyang City, and Wŏlmido also took part in the competition.
