= 2008 DPR Korea Football League =

DPR Korea Football League
- Season: 2008
- Champions: Amrokkang

Statistics of DPR Korea Football League in the 2008 season.

== Overview ==
Amrokkang won both the championship, and the 2008 edition of the Man'gyŏngdae Prize.
