= 2002 DPR Korea Football League =

DPR Korea Football League
- Season: 2002

Statistics of DPR Korea Football League in the 2002 season.

== Overview ==
April 25 won the championship, Rimyŏngsu finished second, and Amrokkang finished third. P'yŏngyang City, Wŏlmido, and the North Hwanghae Provincial College of Physical Education also took part in the competition.

The 2002 edition of the Mangyongdae Cup was won by April 25.
