= 2004 DPR Korea Football League =

DPR Korea Football League
- Season: 2004

Statistics of DPR Korea Football League in the 2004 season.

== Overview ==
Pyongyang City Sports Club won the championship.
