= 1991 DPR Korea Football League =

DPR Korea Football League
- Season: 1991

Statistics of DPR Korea Football League in the 1991 season.

== Overview ==
Pyongyang Sports Club won the championship.
