= 1997 DPR Korea Football League =

DPR Korea Football League
- Season: 1997

Statistics of DPR Korea Football League in the 1997 season.

== Overview ==
Kigwancha Sports Club won the championship.
