= Sinuiju Stadium =

Sports venue in Sinuiju, North Korea

Coordinates: 40°6′37.89″N 124°24′50.70″E

The Sinuiju Stadium (신의주경기장), also known as October Stadium (10월 경기장), is a multi-purpose stadium in Sinuiju, North Korea, that is mainly used for events and football matches of the Kigwancha Sports Club. Built in 1965, it has a capacity of 17,500 spectators.

== See also ==
- List of football stadiums in North Korea
