= 1986 DPR Korea Football League =

DPR Korea Football League
- Season: 1986

Statistics of DPR Korea Football League in the 1986 season.

== Overview ==
4.25 Sports Club won the championship.
