= 2003 DPR Korea Football League =

DPR Korea Football League
- Season: 2003

Statistics of DPR Korea Football League in the 2003 season.

== Overview ==
4.25 Sports Club won the championship.
