= 1993 DPR Korea Football League =

DPR Korea Football League
- Season: 1993

Statistics of DPR Korea Football League in the 1993 season.

== Overview ==
April 25 SC won the championship.
