= 1998 DPR Korea Football League =

DPR Korea Football League
- Season: 1998

Statistics of DPR Korea Football League in the 1998 season.

== Overview ==
Kigwancha Sports Club won the championship.
