= 1996 DPR Korea Football League =

DPR Korea Football League
- Season: 1996

Statistics of DPR Korea Football League in the 1996 season.

== Overview ==
Kigwancha Sports Club won the championship. Kigwanch'a and Rimyongsu Sports Club finished the season tied with 41 points in 22 matches played, but Kigwanch'a finished first on goal differential, having scored one goal more than Rimyŏngsu. April 25 finished third, with 40 points.
