= 1989 DPR Korea Football League =

DPR Korea Football League
- Season: 1989

Statistics of DPR Korea Football League in the 1989 season.

== Overview ==
Chandongja Sports Club won the championship.
