= 2000 DPR Korea Football League =

DPR Korea Football League
- Season: 2000

Statistics of DPR Korea Football League in the 2000 season.

== Overview ==
Kigwancha Sports Club won the championship.
