= 1990 DPR Korea Football League =

DPR Korea Football League
- Season: 1990

Statistics of DPR Korea Football League in the 1990 season.

== Overview ==
4.25 Sports Club won the championship.
