= 2001 DPR Korea Football League =

DPR Korea Football League
- Season: 2001
- Champions: Amrokgang Sports Club

Statistics of DPR Korea Football League in the 2001 season.

== Overview ==
Amrokgang Sports Club won the championship.
