= 2005 DPR Korea Football League =

DPR Korea Football League
- Season: 2005

Statistics of DPR Korea Football League in the 2005 season.

== Overview ==
Pyongyang City Sports Club won the championship, their second in a row.
