= 2022–23 DPR Korea Premier Football League =

DPR Korea Premier League
- Season: 2022–23
- Dates: 2 December 2022 – 25 June 2023
- Champions: April 25 (22nd title); AFC Champions League Two: Failed to obtain mandatory license
- Top goalscorer: Pak Kwang chon (22 goals)

The 2022–23 DPR Korea Premier Football League was the 63rd season of the DPR Korea Premier Football League, the top North Korean association football league, to use a home-and-away format.The league started on 2 December 2022. The league was expected to be organized into three stages, with the first phase concluding in October 2023 and the second phase concluding on 25 June 2023.

The defending champions were April 25.

== League table ==
=== Phase 1 ===
The Phase 1 table for the 2022–23 DPR Korea Premier Football League is unknown.

=== Phase 2 ===
Pos	Team	Pld	W	D	L	GF	GA	GD	Pts
1	April 25								49
2	Ryomyong								45
3	Sonbong								44
4	?								?
5	?								?
6	?								?
7	?								?
8	?								?
9	?								?
10	?								?
11	?								?
12	?								?
