= 1985 DPR Korea Football League =

DPR Korea Football League
- Season: 1985

Statistics of DPR Korea Football League in the 1985 season.

== Overview ==
April 25 Sports Club won the championship.
