= Rungrado 1st of May Stadium =

Stadium in Pyongyang, North Korea

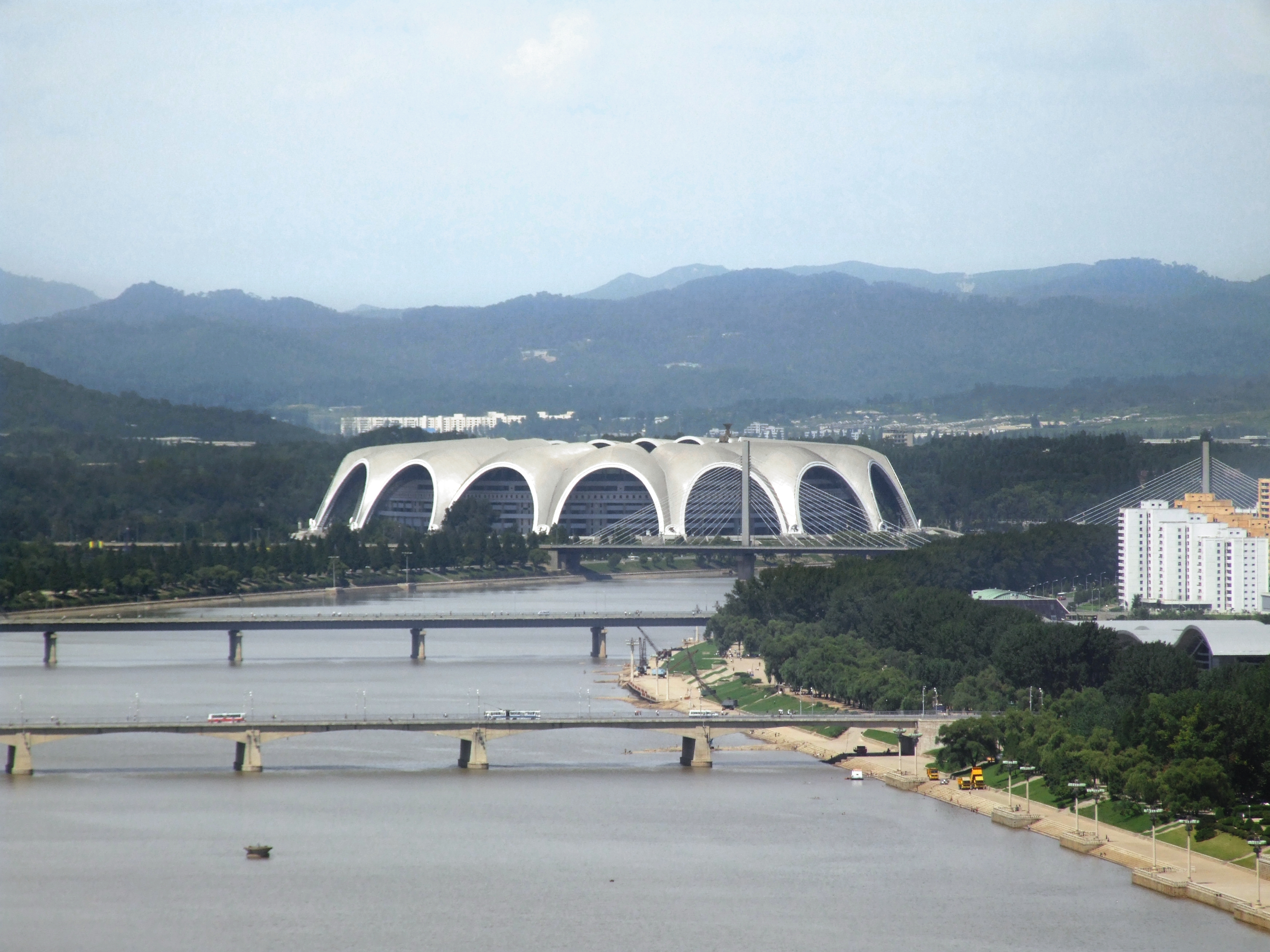
- Interactive map of Rungrado 1st of May Stadium
- Full name: The Rungrado 1st of May Stadium Pyongyang
- Former names: Rungrado May Day Stadium
- Location: Rŭngrado, Pyongyang, North Korea
- Coordinates: 39°02′59″N 125°46′31″E
- Owner: Pyongyang City People's Committee
- Capacity: 113,281
- Surface: Artificial turf
- Field size: Main pitch – 22,500 m^{2} (242,000 sq ft); Total floor space – over 207,000 m^{2} (2,230,000 sq ft)

Construction
- Groundbreaking: 1986
- Built: 1986–1989
- Opened: 1 May 1989

Tenants
- North Korea national football team North Korea women's national football team April 25 Sports Club

Korean name
- Hangul: 릉라도 5월1일 경기장
- Hanja: 綾羅島 五月一日 競技場
- RR: Reungnado 5wol1il gyeonggijang
- MR: Rŭngnado 5wŏl1il kyŏnggijang

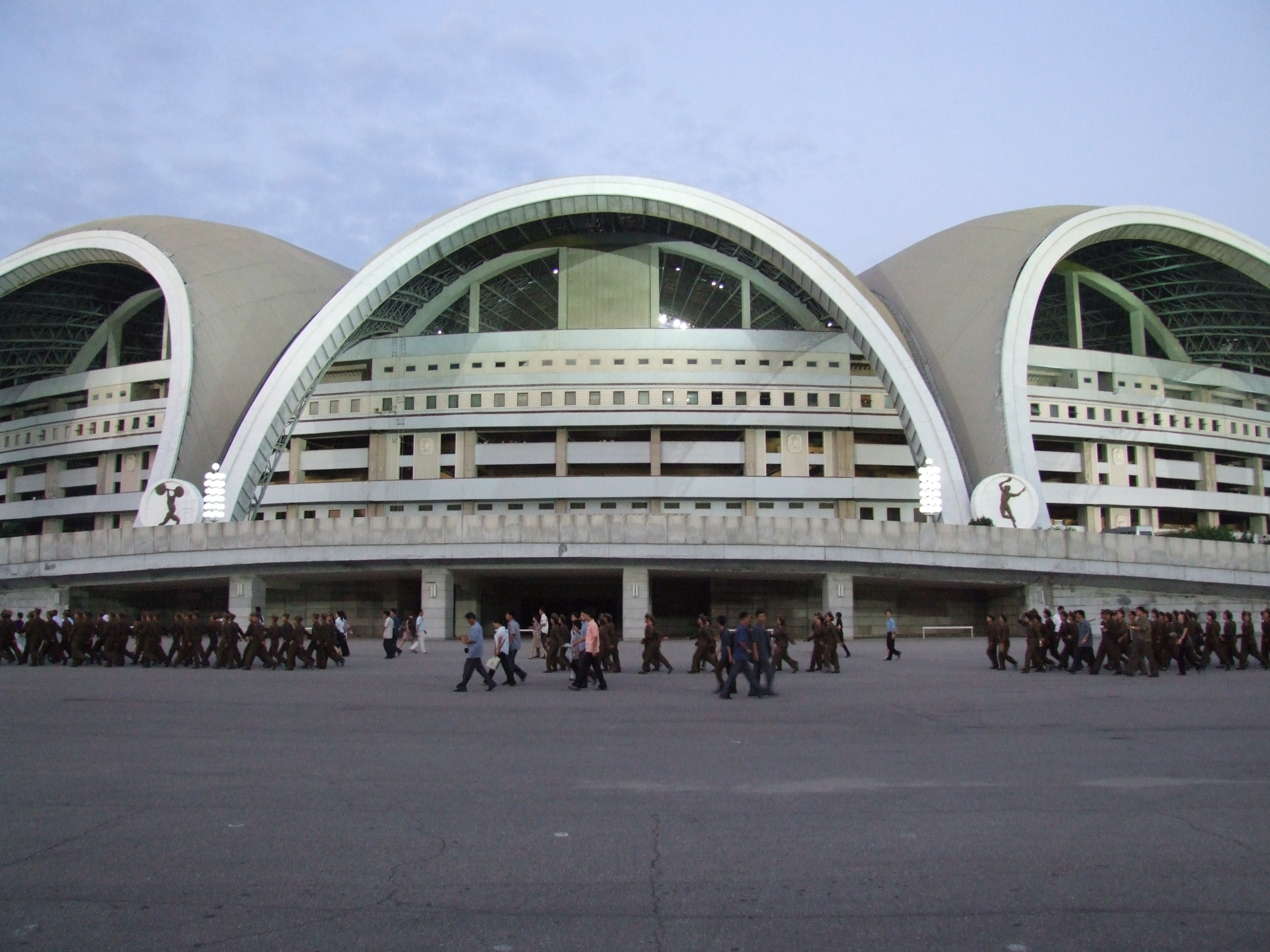
The exterior of the 1st of May Stadium.

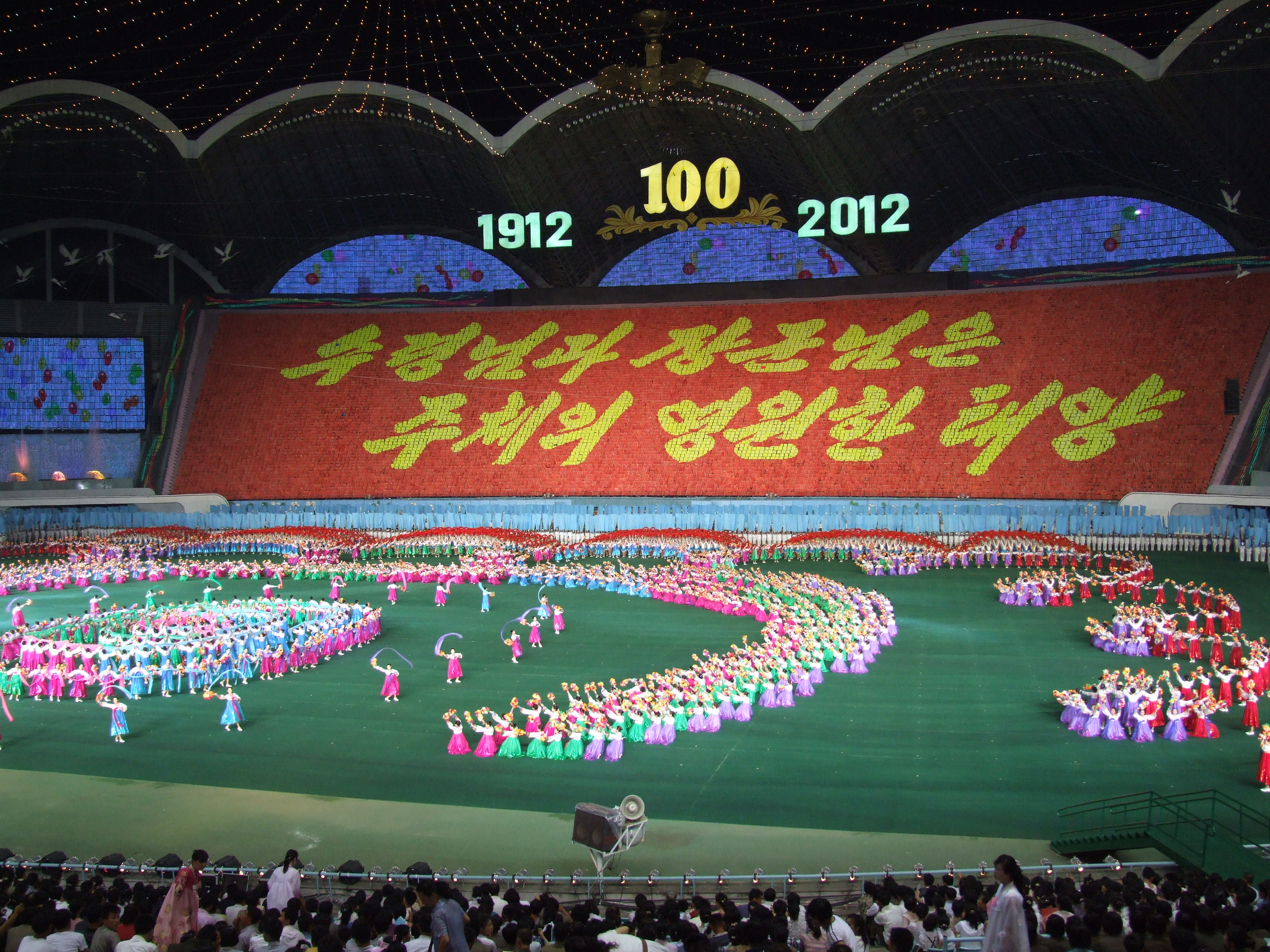
Arirang Festival, on the occasion of the 100th anniversary of the birth of Kim Il Sung.

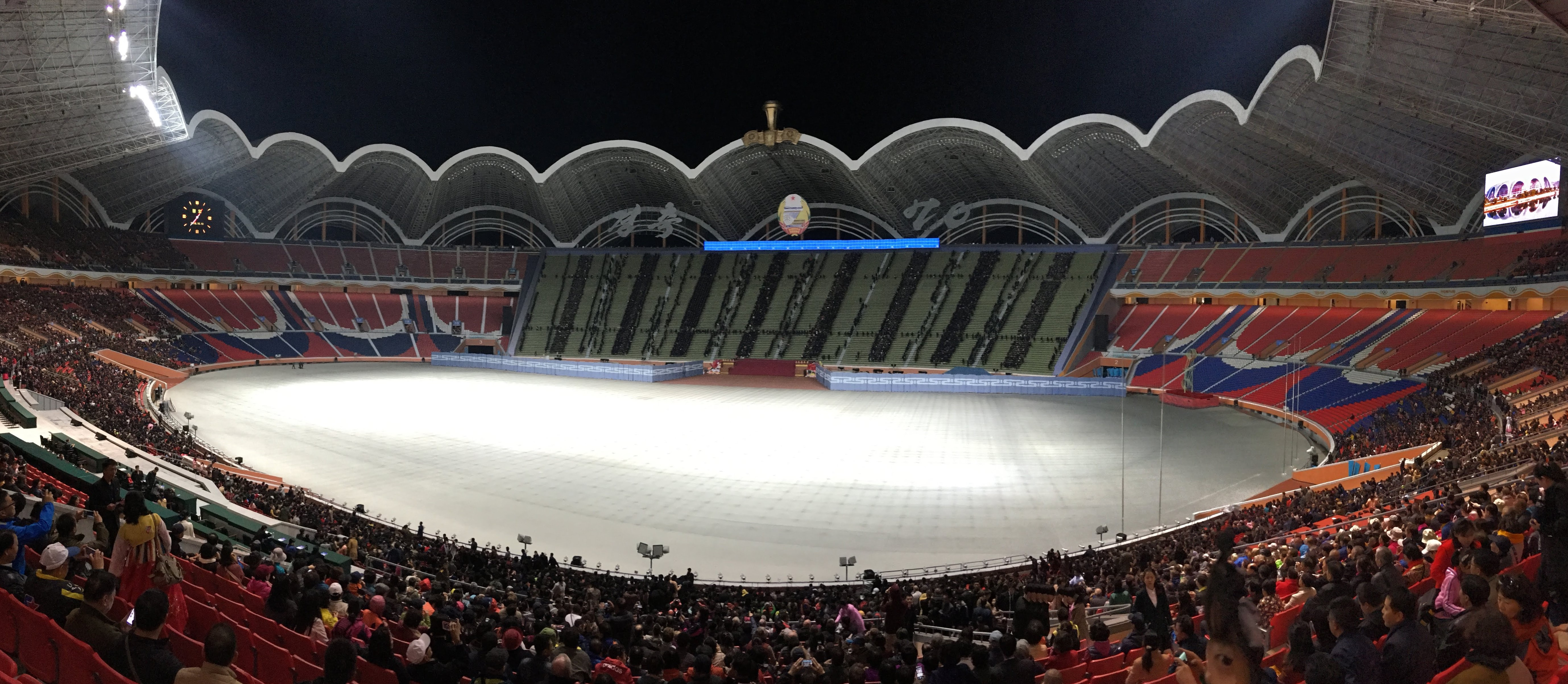
The interior of the stadium.

The Rungrado 1st of May Stadium (Korean: 릉라도 5월1일 경기장) is a multi-purpose stadium occupying an area of 20.7 hectares (51 acres) on the island Rŭngrado, Pyongyang, North Korea. It opened on 1 May 1989, with its first major event being the 13th World Festival of Youth and Students. It is the second largest stadium in the world by seating capacity after Narendra Modi Stadium.

== Uses ==
The stadium is currently used for football matches, a few athletics events and sometimes for the mass games of the Arirang Festival.

== Design ==
The stadium's scalloped roof features 16 arches arranged in a ring, and resembles a magnolia blossom. It hosts events on a main pitch covering 22,500 m^{2} (242,000 sq ft). Its total floor space is over 207,000 m^{2} (2,230,000 sq ft) across eight stories, and the lobes of its roof peak at more than 60 m (200 ft) above the ground. The stadium was originally built with an official capacity of 150,000. After a 2014 remodel which included the replacement of some bench seating with individual seats, observers estimated a new capacity of approximately 114,000.

== History ==
After the 1988 Summer Olympics had been awarded to Seoul, North Korea intensified its efforts to present itself as the legitimate Korean state. As part of these efforts, it successfully bid to organize the 13th World Festival of Youth and Students in Pyongyang in 1989. Massive construction projects were initiated in preparation for the festival, one of which was the Rungrado 1st of May Stadium. At the time of completion, it was the largest stadium ever built in Asia.

While the stadium is used for sporting events, it is more frequently the site of massive performances and shows celebrating President Kim Il Sung and the North Korean nation. In June–July 2002, it was the site of the giant Arirang Festival gymnastic and artistic performance. The extravaganza involved over 100,000 participants—double the number of spectators, and was open to foreigners. These performances are now an annual feature in Pyongyang, usually in August and September. The event was recognized by the Guinness Book of Records in 2007 as the largest gymnastics display ever, with 100,090 participants.

Collision in Korea, the largest professional wrestling pay-per-view event ever, was held at Rungrado Stadium on 28–29 April 1995. Attendance was 150,000 and 190,000, respectively, according to local authorities.

After a two-year renovation project, the stadium reopened in 2015. In July 2017, the Rungrado Stadium played host to six group stage matches as part of 2018 AFC U-23 Championship qualification.

In the September 2018 inter-Korean summit in Pyongyang, President Moon Jae-in of South Korea gave a speech with Chairman Kim Jong Un to 150,000 North Korean spectators. The speech has themes of unification, peace, and cooperation.

In July 2019, Kim Jong Un hosted Chinese Communist Party general secretary Xi Jinping to a special Grand Mass Gymnastics and Artistic performance called "Invincible Socialism", on the occasion of the 70th anniversary of China–North Korea relations.

On 31 December 2022, a concert was held on the grounds of the stadium, commemorating New Year's Eve, which was presided over by Kim Jong Un and along with other high-profile Workers' Party of Korea officials. Since then, Rungrado has been the main host venue for New Year's Eve celebrations.

== Notable events ==
- Opening and closing ceremonies of the 13th World Festival of Youth and Students in 1989
- Collision in Korea professional wrestling event in 1995
- 2018 Inter-Korean Summit Pyongyang

=== Annual events ===
- Arirang Festival
- Pyongyang Marathon

== See also ==
- List of football stadiums in North Korea
- Strahov Stadium
- Yanggakdo Stadium
