= Sariwon Youth Stadium =

Sports venue in Sariwon, North Korea

Coordinates: 38.4967°N 125.7575°E

- Interactive map of Sariwon Youth Stadium
- Full name: Sariwon Youth Stadium
- Location: Sariwon, North Korea
- Capacity: 35,000

Construction
- Opened: 1981

Sariwon Youth Stadium (사리원청년경기장) is a multi-purpose stadium in Sariwon, North Korea. It is currently used mostly for football matches. The stadium holds 35,000 spectators and opened in 1981.

== See also ==
- List of football stadiums in North Korea
