= Football at the Pochonbo Torch Prize Sports Games =

- Organiser(s): DPR Korea Football Association
- Founded: 2005
- Most championships: April 25 Sports Club

Football at the Pochonbo Torch Prize Sports Games is an annual association football men's competition in Multi-sport event – Pochonbo Torch Prize Sports Games in North Korea, organised by the DPR Korea Football Association.

== Results ==
Season	Champion	Runner-up	Third place	Final
2005	April 25	Amnokgang	P'yŏngyang	
2006	Rimyŏngsu			? (Hyesan Stadium)
2007	Kigwanch'a			
2008	Unknown			
2009	Rimyŏngsu			
2010	Sobaeksu	P'yŏngyang	Kigwancha	? (Kim Il-sung Stadium)
2011	April 25			
2012	Rimyŏngsu			
2013	Hwaebul	Kyŏnggong'ŏpsong	Rimyŏngsu	2–1 a.e.t
2014	April 25	Hwaebul	Sobaeksu or P'yŏngyang	1–0
2015	P'yŏngyang	Rimyŏngsu	Wŏlmido or ?	2–1 (Rungrado 1st of May Stadium)
2016	Amnokgang	Sobaeksu	Kigwancha	2–1 (Sŏsan Stadium)
2017	Unknown			Kim Il-sung Stadium

== Performance by club ==
Club	Winners	Runners-up	Third place*	Winning seasons	Runners-up seasons	Third place seasons
April 25	3			2005, 2011, 2014		
Rimyŏngsu	3	1	1	2006, 2009, 2012	2015	2013
P'yŏngyang	1	1	1 (+1)	2015	2010	2005, (2014)
Sobaeksu	1	1	(1)	2010	2016	(2014)
Amrokkang	1	1		2016	2005	
Hwaebul	1	1		2013	2014	
Kigwancha	1		3	2007		2010, 2016
Kyŏnggong'ŏp		1			2013	
Wŏlmido			(1)			(2015)
* - Brackets indicate the club reached the semi-finals, but result of third-place match is unknown
