= Ryomyong Sports Club =

- Full name: Ryomyong Sports Club
- Ground: Kim Il Sung Stadium
- Capacity: 50,000
- Manager: Sin Yong-nam
- League: DPR Korea Premier Football League

Ryomyong Sports Club (Korean: 려명체육단) is a professional football club based in P'yŏngyang, North Korea. They play in a red home kit. "Ryomyong" means light of the dawn in the Korean language.

== History ==
Ryomyong reached the 2017 Hwaebul Cup final, ultimately losing to Sobaeksu. They then won their first DPR Korea Premier Football League title in 2020–21 and their second in 2023–24.

=== Continental ===
Competition	Pld	W	D	L	GF	GA
AFC Cup	4	2	2	0	6	0
Total	4	2	2	0	6	0

Season	Competition	Round	Club	Home	Away	Aggregate	Ref
2019	AFC Cup	Qualifying preliminary round	(Mongolia) Erchim	3–0	3–0	6–0	
2019	AFC Cup	Qualifying play-off round	(Hong Kong) Tai Po	0–0	0–0	0–0 (3–5 p)	

== Players ==
The following players were included in the 2025-2026 season.

Note: Flags indicate national team as defined under FIFA eligibility rules; some limited exceptions apply. Players may hold more than one non-FIFA nationality.

No.	Pos.	Nation	Player
5	DF	PRK	Choe Ji-song
6	MF	PRK	Yun Min
8	MF	PRK	Mun Chong-jong
9	FW	PRK	Kim Pom-hyok
10	FW	PRK	Ri Jo-guk
11	FW	PRK	Kim Jin-song
15	MF	PRK	Paek Kwang-min
16	DF	PRK	Pak Kwang-chon
20	MF	PRK	Kang Jin
21	GK	PRK	Yu Kwang-jun
22	DF	PRK	Ri Won-gwang
23	MF	PRK	Kye Tam
24	DF	PRK	Choe Yu-song
25	DF	PRK	Kim Kum-song
30	DF	PRK	Sin Kwang-sok

No.	Pos.	Nation	Player
—	GK	PRK	Hong Tae-han
—	DF	PRK	Ri Song-hung
—	DF	PRK	Jong Hwi-nam
—	DF	PRK	Choe Ryong-il
—	MF	PRK	Ri Kum-chol
—	MF	PRK	Yom Chol-gyong
—	MF	PRK	Ri Il-song
—	MF	PRK	Paek Chung-song

== Managers ==
- (North Korea) Sin Yong-nam(2018-2019)
- (North Korea) Ri Kwang-chon(2023-2025)
- (North Korea) Sin Yong-nam(since 2025)

== Achievements ==
=== Domestic ===
- DPR Korea Premier Football League: 3
  - Champions (2): 2020–21, 2023–24
  - Runners-up(1): 2017–18
- Hwaebul Cup: 2
  - Runners-up (2): 2017, 2025
- Man'gyŏngdae Prize: 1
  - Third place (1): 2016
