= Football at the Mangyongdae Prize Sports Games =

- Organiser(s): DPR Korea Football Association
- Founded: 2000
- Region: North Korea
- Most championships: April 25

The Football at the Mangyongdae Prize is an association football competition held for professional teams in Multi-sport event - Mangyongdae Prize Sports Games in North Korea. The competition is named after the Mangyongdae settlement, where Kim Hyong-jik was from. Founded in 2000, the competition is organized by the DPR Korea Football Association.

== Results ==
Season	Champion	Runner-up	Third place	Fourth place	Final
2000	Rimyŏngsu				
2001	Rimyŏngsu				
2002	April 25				
2004	Kigwancha				
2005	Kigwancha				
2006	Unknown				
2007	Amnokgang				
2008	Amnokgang				
2009	April 25				
2010	Rimyŏngsu			Sobaeksu	
2011	Unknown				
2012	April 25				
2013	Rimyŏngsu	Amnokgang			2–1 (Kim Il Sung Stadium)
2014	April 25	Amnokgang	Kigwancha	Sobaeksu	1–0 (Kim Il Sung Stadium)
2015	April 25	Kigwancha	Rimyŏngsu	Sobaeksu	1–0 (Kim Il Sung Stadium)
2016	April 25	Kigwancha	Ryŏmyŏng		1–0 (Rungrado 1st of May Stadium)
2017	April 25	February 8	Hwaebul	Sŏnbong	2–0 (Rungrado 1st of May Stadium)
2018	Kigwancha				
2019	Kigwancha	Rimyongsu	Ryŏmyŏng, Sobaeksu		2–1
2021	Kigwancha	Ryŏmyŏng	April 25	Hwaebul	
2022	Ryŏmyŏng				
