= Jebi Sports Club =

Jebi 제비
- Full name: Jebi Sports Club 제비체육단
- Ground: Pyongyang City Stadium
- Capacity: 10,000
- Chairman: Ri Tae-kum
- Manager: Choe Nam-il
- League: DPR Korea Premier Football League
Home colours	Away colours

- Jebi Sports Club
- Hangul: 제비체육단
- Hanja: 제비體育團
- RR: Jebi cheyukdan
- MR: Chebi ch'eyuktan

Jebi Sports Club is a North Korean professional football club affiliated with the Korean People's Air Force. Jebi means swallow in Korean. They play in the DPR Korea Premier Football League.

The Jebi women's football team plays in the DPR Korea Women's League, since earning promotion from Division 2 at the end of 2014.

== Managers ==
- (North Korea) Choe Nam-il
- (North Korea) Yon Kwak-mu (since 2025)

== Players ==
The following players were included in the 2024-2025 season squad.

Note: Flags indicate national team as defined under FIFA eligibility rules; some limited exceptions apply. Players may hold more than one non-FIFA nationality.

No.	Pos.	Nation	Player
1	GK	PRK	Pang Kuk-hyŏn
2	DF	PRK	Han Jin-myong
5	DF	PRK	Ryu Tae-song
7	MF	PRK	Rim Won
8	DF	PRK	Ri Kyong-jin
9	FW	PRK	Ju Kwang-song
10	MF	PRK	Jong Kum-hyok (Captain)
11	MF	PRK	Kim Il-chol
13	FW	PRK	Kim Yon-su

No.	Pos.	Nation	Player
14	MF	PRK	Kang Tae-guk
15	DF	PRK	Kwon Il
20	MF	PRK	Kim Won-il
