= Yanggakdo Stadium =

Sports venue in Pyongyang, North Korea

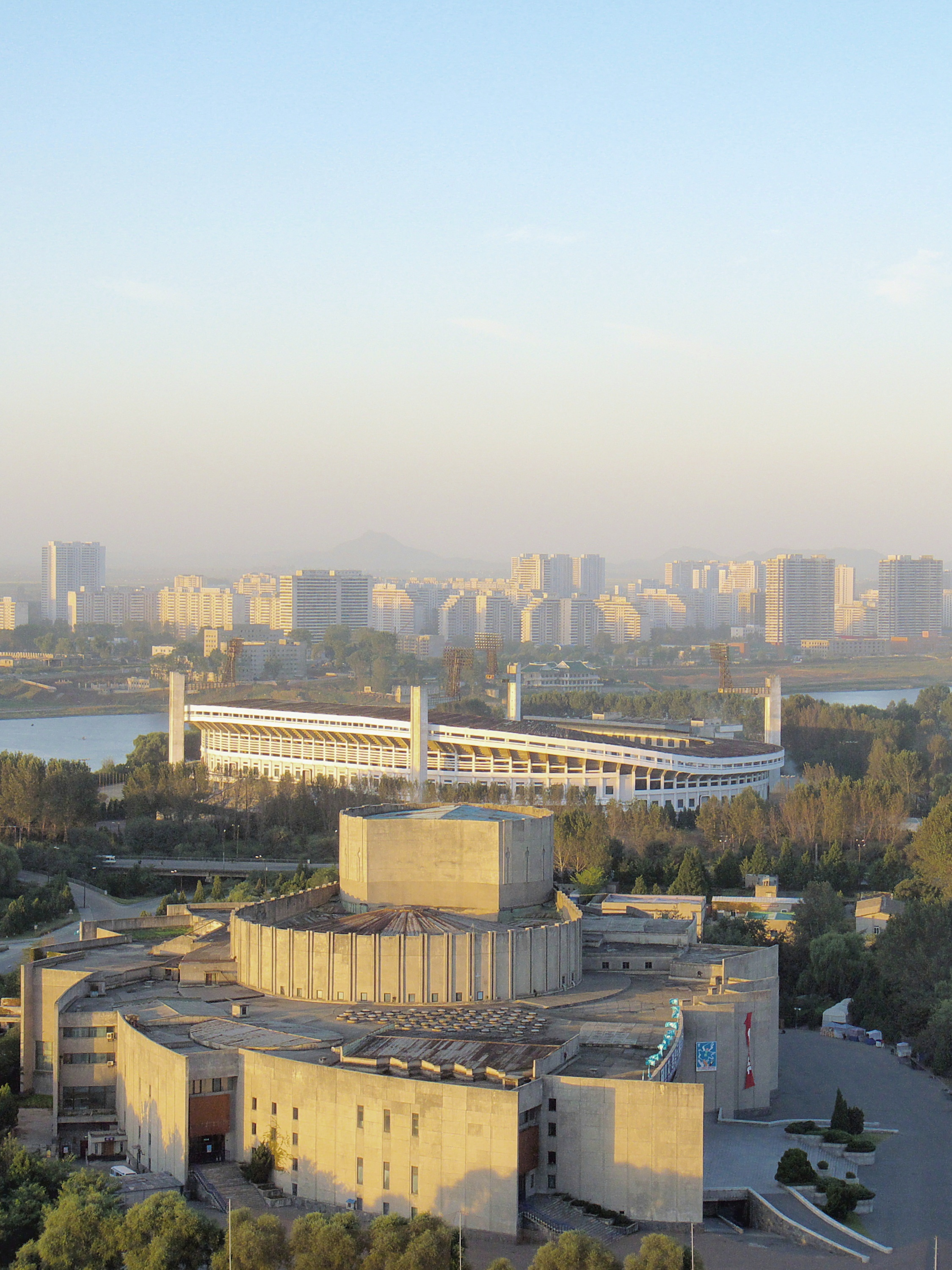
- Interactive map of Yanggakdo Stadium
- Location: Pyongyang, North Korea
- Coordinates: 38°59′30″N 125°44′37″E
- Capacity: 30,000
- Surface: Artificial turf

Construction
- Opened: 18 May 1989
- Renovated: 2017–present
- Closed: 2017–present

Tenants
- North Korea national football team North Korea women's national football team Football clubs based in Pyongyang

- Yanggakdo Stadium
- Hangul: 양각도경기장
- Hanja: 羊角島競技場
- RR: Yanggakdo gyeonggijang
- MR: Yanggakto kyŏnggijang

Yanggakdo Stadium is a multi-purpose stadium located on Yanggak Island in Pyongyang, North Korea, that was used mainly for football matches. The stadium holds 30,000 people and was opened on 18 May 1989. Since 2017, the stadium had been under reconstruction.

== History ==
As seen through satellite imagery, the stadium began undergoing renovations in 2017, when the running track and the pitch have been taken down, individual seats disassembled. In 2018, the floodlights were dismantled. The works in the stadium were confirmed by the state media in 2019.

== Complex ==
In addition to the main football pitch and athletics track, there are indoor training areas for bodybuilding, weightlifting, table tennis, boxing, wrestling, judo, and swimming. There are also dedicated spaces for football referees, changing rooms for players, a broadcasting room, correspondents' and commentator's rooms, and medical facilities. Complementing the main pitch are three training pitches for football and formerly eight tennis courts, which were demolished in 2017. The main pitch itself was removed sometime between 2018 and 2020.

== See also ==
- List of football stadiums in North Korea
