= Sonbong Sports Club =

Sŏnbong Sports Club 선봉
- Full name: Sŏnbong Sports Club 선봉체육단
- Ground: Rajin Stadium
- Capacity: 20,000
- Manager: Kim Jong-min
- League: DPR Korea Premier Football League
Home colours	Away colours

- Sonbong Sports Club
- Hangul: 선봉체육단
- Hanja: 先鋒體育團
- RR: Seonbong cheyukdan
- MR: Sŏnbong ch'eyuktan

Sŏnbong Sports Club is a North Korean professional football club from Rasŏn, affiliated with the Worker-Peasant Red Guards. They play in the DPR Korea Premier Football League. Their home ground is the Rajin Stadium. Sonbong is a region in Rason called Sonbong-guyok.

The Sŏnbong women's football team plays in the DPR Korea Women's League, since earning promotion from Division 2 at the end of 2014.

== Players ==
The following players were included in the 2025-2026 season squad.

Note: Flags indicate national team as defined under FIFA eligibility rules; some limited exceptions apply. Players may hold more than one non-FIFA nationality.

No.	Pos.	Nation	Player
1	GK	PRK	Kim Hyok
2	FW	PRK	Pak Tae-chol
5	FW	PRK	Hyong Hyo-myong
6	DF	PRK	Kwak Sung-jin
9	DF	PRK	Yun Kum-song
11	FW	PRK	Kim Tae-kuk
12	FW	PRK	Choe Jin-song
13	FW	PRK	Kim Yung-song
15	MF	PRK	Kwon Nam-hyok
16	DF	PRK	Ro Jong-yong
19	DF	PRK	Pak Chol-ju

No.	Pos.	Nation	Player
22	DF	PRK	Kim Kwang-yong
23	DF	PRK	Song Tae-bok
24	DF	PRK	Kim Kyong-sok (Captain)
25	GK	PRK	Kang Kuk-jin
30	MF	PRK	An Kyong-min
33	DF	PRK	Won Kum-myong
35	DF	PRK	Ri Ji-wi
10	FW	PRK	Ri Won-gwang
