= Amnokgang Sports Club =

North Korean multi-sports club

Amnokgang 압록강
- Full name: Amnokgang Sports Club 압록강체육단
- Founded: 19 September 1947; 79 years ago
- Ground: Home stadium is unclear Based in Pyongyang
- Chairman: Ho Sŏk-yong
- Manager: Kim Myong-chol
- League: DPR Korea Premier Football League
Home colours	Away colours

- Amnokgang Sports Club
- Chosŏn'gŭl: 압록강체육단
- Hancha: 鴨綠江體育團
- Revised Romanization: Amnokgang cheyukdan
- McCune–Reischauer: Amnokkang ch'eyuktan

Amnokgang Sports Club is a North Korean multi-sports club. Based in Pyongyang, the men's club competes in the DPR Korea Premier Football League.

== History ==
Affiliated with the Ministry of People's Security, it was founded on 19 September 1947.

Former logo of the team

The club is best known for its men's and women's football teams. The men's football team presently plays in the DPR Korea Premier League, and in various domestic cup competitions. They won several competitions in the 1960s, and won national titles in 2001, 2006, and 2008.

== Rivalries ==
Amnokgang's primary rivals are April 25. April 25 belongs to the Ministry of People's Armed Forces, and the professional rivalry between the Military and Police carries over onto the sports field.

== Players ==
=== Season 2025/26 ===
The following players were included in the 2026 Hwaebul Cup match against Pyongyang Sports Club.

Note: Flags indicate national team as defined under FIFA eligibility rules; some limited exceptions apply. Players may hold more than one non-FIFA nationality.

No.	Pos.	Nation	Player
2	FW	PRK	Jang Un-gwang
3	FW	PRK	Kang Wi-song
4	DF	PRK	Pak Son-il
5	FW	PRK	Jon Chol-yong
6	MF	PRK	Kang Song-jin
8	MF	PRK	Ra Myong-song
10	MF	PRK	Kim Hyon
11	MF	PRK	Pyon Kum-dong
12	MF	PRK	Han Jae-yong

No.	Pos.	Nation	Player
13	MF	PRK	Jang Chol-hyok
15	MF	PRK	Ju Il-chol
16	DF	PRK	Kim Hyon
19	DF	PRK	Han Kum-song (captain)
20	MF	PRK	Ri Myong
22	DF	PRK	Kim Gum-hyok
28	MF	PRK	Ri Jin-gwon
30	GK	PRK	Kim Hyon-song

== Managers ==
- (North Korea) Ku Jong-nam (2013–2014)
- (North Korea) Han Won-chol (since 2014)
- (North Korea) Kim Myong-chol (since 2022)

== Achievements ==
- DPR Korea Football League: 3

(gold) 2001, 2006, 2008
(silver) 1984, 2007
(bronze) 2002, 2010, 2011, 2014, 2016, 2023

- Hwaebul Cup: 2

(gold) 2025, 2026
SF 2013

- Man'gyŏngdae Prize: 2

(gold) 2007, 2008
(silver) 2013, 2014

- Paektusan Prize: 1

(gold) 2012
(silver) 2007

- Poch'ŏnbo Torch Prize: 1

(gold) 2016
(silver) 2005

- Cup for the 60th Anniversary of the Victory in the Fatherland Liberation War: 1

(gold) 2013

- Republican Championship: 1

(gold) 2007
(silver) 2009
(bronze) 2011

== Women's football ==
Amnokgang's women's football team won the national championship in 2004.

== Other sports ==
In addition to football, the club has teams for ice hockey, basketball, volleyball, handball, and table tennis.
