= Rimyongsu Sports Club =

Rimyŏngsu 리명수
- Full name: Rimyŏngsu Sports Club 리명수체육단
- Ground: Sariwŏn Youth Stadium, Sariwon
- Capacity: 35,000
- Manager: Kim Kyong-il
- League: DPR Korea Premier Football League
Home colours	Away colours

- Rimyongsu Sports Club
- Hangul: 리명수체육단
- Hanja: 李明洙體育團
- RR: Ri Myeongsu cheyukdan
- MR: Ri Myŏngsu ch'eyuktan

Rimyŏngsu Sports Club (Korean: 리명수체육단) is a North Korean professional football club based in Sariwŏn. Despite never winning the DPR Korea League, Rimyŏngsu supplied four players to the 2005 FIFA U-17 World Championship and five players to the 2007 FIFA U-20 World Cup, more than any other North Korean club. Like the Amrokkang Sports Club, Rimyŏngsu is affiliated with the Ministry of People's Security. It was named after General Ri Myŏng-su.

In 2014, Rimyongsu got to the final of the AFC President's Cup, but lost to HTTU Aşgabat of Turkmenistan 2-1.

Forward Kang Kuk-chol was one of the top scorers in the 2015 edition of the Poch'ŏnbo Torch Prize.

In 2022, Rimyongsu won their first Hwaebul Cup after defeating 4.25 SC 2–1 with a goal from Jong Il-gwan in the second half.

== Players ==
The following players were included in the 2026 Hwaebul Cup

Note: Flags indicate national team as defined under FIFA eligibility rules; some limited exceptions apply. Players may hold more than one non-FIFA nationality.

No.	Pos.	Nation	Player
1	GK	PRK	Ri Kum-hyok
2	MF	PRK	Ri Song-hung
3	FW	PRK	Jong Kum-song
6	MF	PRK	Kang Kuk-chol
7	MF	PRK	Ri Chung-il
8	DF	PRK	Park Young-geon
9	FW	PRK	Pak Kwang-hun
10	FW	PRK	Han Kum-ryong
11	MF	PRK	Ri Kwang-myong

No.	Pos.	Nation	Player
15	MF	PRK	Ri Yong-chol
16	MF	PRK	Pak Jin-hyok
17	MF	PRK	Sin Kwang-nam
18	DF	PRK	Kim Seung-hee
19	DF	PRK	Kim Kwang-kuk
22	MF	PRK	Jong Su-hun
24	MF	PRK	Kim Pyong
26	DF	PRK	Choe Kang-song
27	GK	PRK	Moon Jik-gi

== Managers ==
- (North Korea) Jo Tong-sam (2013)
- (North Korea) Ri Myong-ho (2014)
- (North Korea) Kim Kyong-il (current)

== Achievements ==
=== Domestic ===
- DPR Korea League: 4

(silver) 1995, 1996, 2002
(bronze) 2012

- Hwaebul Cup: 1

(gold) 2022

- Man'gyŏngdae Prize: 5

(gold) 2000, 2001, 2010, 2013
(bronze) 2015

- Paektusan Prize: 3

(gold) 2010, 2011
(silver) 2012

- Poch'ŏnbo Torch Prize: 3

(gold) 2006, 2012
(silver) 2015

=== International ===
- AFC President's Cup: 1

(silver) 2014

== Continental record ==
Season	Competition	Round	Club	Score	Position
2014	AFC President's Cup	Group Stage (B)	(Philippines) Ceres F.C.	2–2	2nd
2014	AFC President's Cup	Group Stage (B)	(Turkmenistan) FC HTTU	1–1	2nd
2014	AFC President's Cup	Group Stage (B)	(Chinese Taipei) Tatung F.C.	5–0	2nd
2014	AFC President's Cup	Final Stage (B)	(Bangladesh) Sheikh Russel KC	4–0	1st
2014	AFC President's Cup	Final Stage (B)	(Mongolia) Erchim	5–0	1st
2014	AFC President's Cup	Final	(Turkmenistan) FC HTTU	1–2	Runners-up
