= Kigwancha Sports Club =

Kigwancha
- Full name: Kigwancha Sports Club
- Nickname: Sinŭiju Locomotive Sports Club
- Founded: 11 January 1956; 70 years ago
- Ground: Sinuiju Stadium
- Capacity: 17,500
- Manager: Chol Jon
- League: DPR Korea Premier Football League
Home colours	Away colours	Third colours

- Kigwancha Sports Club
- Hangul: 기관차체육단
- Hanja: 機關車體育團
- Lit.: Locomotive Sports Club
- RR: Gigwancha cheyukdan
- MR: Kigwanch'a ch'eyuktan

Kigwancha Sports Club or Kigwancha Sports Team (Korean: 기관차체육단; 'locomotive'), known as the Sinuiju Locomotive Sports Club is a North Korean multi-sports club belonging to the Korean State Railway and based in Sinuiju. It was established on 11 January 1956, and has been awarded the Order of Kim Il-sung and the Order of the National Flag (First Class). The club is best known for its men's and women's football teams.

Kigwancha's men presently play in the DPR Korea Premier Football League, and won several championships in the late 1990s. The club finished third in the 2006 season. They have taken part in continental competition once, finishing second in their group in the group stage of the 2017 AFC Cup.

== Known players (including former players) ==
- (North Korea) Li Chan-myung
- (North Korea) Pak Chol-ryong
- (North Korea) Pak Kwang-ryong

== Players ==
The following players were included in the 2025-2026 season squad based on kcna articles and sports broadcasts.

Note: Flags indicate national team as defined under FIFA eligibility rules; some limited exceptions apply. Players may hold more than one non-FIFA nationality.

No.	Pos.	Nation	Player
1	GK	PRK	Sin Kwang-guk
2	MF	PRK	Hong Paek-hyon
3	MF	PRK	Jong Ye-won
5	MF	PRK	Choe Kuk-kon
6	MF	PRK	Pak Chung-il
7	MF	PRK	So Jong-gil
10	MF	PRK	Kwak Dong-myong
11	FW	PRK	Kim Kuk-jin
12	DF	PRK	An Jun-sok
14	DF	PRK	Choe Ok-Chol (captain)
15	DF	PRK	Ri Chol-u
16	DF	PRK	Ri Pil-guk
17	MF	PRK	Ri Chung-gyu

No.	Pos.	Nation	Player
18	GK	PRK	So Kwang-rim
19	MF	PRK	Ra Nam-hyon
20	MF	PRK	Ri Ji-song
21	MF	PRK	Kim Hyon-il
22	DF	PRK	Ri Se-chol
23	DF	PRK	Choe Kwang-hwi
24	FW	PRK	Ri Kum-hyon
25	DF	PRK	Jong Song-bom
29	DF	PRK	Rim Ji-ho
30	MF	PRK	Han Il-bok
35	FW	PRK	Pak Kwang-ryong

== Managers ==
- (North Korea) Ku Jong-nam (before 2014)
- (North Korea) Han Won-chol (since 2014)
- (North Korea) Chol Jon (since 2025)

== Continental history ==
Season	Competition	Round	Club	Home	Away	Position
2017	AFC Cup	Group I	(Mongolia) Erchim	7–0	3–0	2nd
2017	AFC Cup	Group I	(North Korea) April 25	2–2	1–1	2nd

== Achievements ==
- DPR Korea League: 9

(gold) 1996, 1997, 1998, 1999, 2000, 2016
(bronze) 1995, 2006, 2012

- Hwaebul Cup: 2

(silver) 2015
4th 2017

- Man'gyŏngdae Prize: 5

(gold) 2004, 2005
(silver) 2015, 2016
(bronze) 2014

- Paektusan Prize: 1

(bronze) 2012

- Poch'ŏnbo Torch Prize: 3

(gold) 2007
(bronze) 2010, 2016

== Other sports ==
The club also has basketball and volleyball teams. Athletes representing the club also play tennis.
