= Sobaeksu Sports Club =

Sobaeksu 소백수
- Full name: Sobaeksu Sports Club 소백수 체육단'
- Ground: Yanggakdo Stadium
- Capacity: 30,000
- Chairman: Choe Yun-gi
- Manager: Ri Tu-hun
- League: DPR Korea Premier Football League
Home colours	Away colours

- Sobaeksu Sports Club
- Chosŏn'gŭl: 소백수체육단
- Hancha: 小白水體育團
- Revised Romanization: Sobaeksu cheyukdan
- McCune–Reischauer: Sobaeksu ch'eyuktan

Sobaeksu Sports Club (Korean: 소백수체육단, Sobaeksu Ch'eyuktang) is a North Korean multi-sports club based in Pyongyang, best known for its men's and women's football teams, playing at Yanggakdo Stadium. Sobaeksu is the first tributary of the Amnok river.

== Rivalries ==
Sobaeksu has a rivalry with Kigwancha, with whom they share the Yanggakdo Stadium.

== Players ==
=== Season 2025/26 ===
The following players were included in the 2026 Hwaebul Cup match against Hwaebul Sports Club.

Note: Flags indicate national team as defined under FIFA eligibility rules; some limited exceptions apply. Players may hold more than one non-FIFA nationality.

No.	Pos.	Nation	Player
1	GK	PRK	Kim Ryong-ik
3	DF	PRK	Kim Thae-ryong
5	DF	PRK	Kim Kwang-chong
6	DF	PRK	Oh Ho-bom
7	MF	PRK	Sin Jun-song (captain)
8	MF	PRK	Kil Chol-bum
9	DF	PRK	Kim Il-bom
10	MF	PRK	Kim Se-jin
11	FW	PRK	Kim Mu-song
12	MF	PRK	Kim Nam-hyon
13	FW	PRK	Cha Kwon-ung

No.	Pos.	Nation	Player
14	MF	PRK	Shin Chol-mu
15	MF	PRK	Kim Won-min
16	DF	PRK	Kim Song-hye
21	FW	PRK	Kim Myong-jin
23	MF	PRK	Jong Mu-gyo
23	MF	PRK	Jang Won-ryong
25	FW	PRK	Ri Un-ryong
26	DF	PRK	Kang Ju-ryong
28	DF	PRK	Choe Jong-ryong
31	GK	PRK	Choe Su-hyon

=== Notable players ===
Sobaeksu player Kim Su-hyŏng was listed third on North Korea's list of top ten athletes of 2016, and forward Cho Kwang led all players in scoring in the 2017 edition of the Paektusan Prize football competition, with a total of seven goals.

Sobaeksu has several players with experience in foreign leagues, notably goalkeeper Ri Kwang-il, who played for FK Radnički 1923 and FK Erdoglija Kragujevac in Serbia, and striker Ri Myong-jun, who played with Dinaburg FC and FC Daugava in Latvia, FC Vestsjælland in Denmark, and Singhtarua FC in Thailand. Ri Jun-il is one of several Sobaeksu players who play or have played for the North Korea national football team.

== Managers ==
- (North Korea) Kim Jong-hun (2011–)

== Achievements ==
=== Domestic Cups ===
- Paektusan Prize: 1
  - Runners-up: 2016
- Poch'ŏnbo Torch Prize: 1
  - Runners-up: 2016
- Hwaebul Cup: 1
  - Champions: 2017

== Other sports ==
In addition to football, they play basketball, volleyball, and ice hockey.
