= DPR Korea Football League =

- Founded: 1960; 66 years ago
- Country: North Korea
- Confederation: AFC
- Divisions: DPR Korea Premier Football League (1st division); DPR Korea Football League 2 (2nd division); DPR Korea Football League 3 (3rd division)
- Domestic cup(s): Hwaebul Cup; DPR Korea Championship; Mangyongdae Prize; Paektusan Prize; Pochonbo Torch Prize; Osandok Prize

The DPR Korea Football League (Chosŏn'gŭl: 조선민주주의인민공화국 축구 리그) is North Korea's association football league. It has a first division DPR Korea Premier Football League, a second division DPR Korea Football League 2, and a third division DPR Korea Football League 3.

== History ==
Including football, all sports in North Korea were on an amateur basis, with competitions called Technical Innovation Contests (Chosŏn'gŭl: 기술혁신경기대회; Hanja: 技術革新競技大會) being held several times a year In football, First Technical Innovation Contests was held In 1960.

The league was the subject of the 1978 sport drama called Centre Forward. The movie was directed by Kil-in Kim and Chong-song Pak and starred In-son Cha.

In 2010, football's National Championship was renamed Top Class Football League or Highest Class Football League (Chosŏn'gŭl: 최상급축구련맹전; Hanja: 最上級蹴球聯盟戰).

In October 2017, the Highest Class Football League was replaced by the DPR Korea Premier Football League, (Chosŏn'gŭl: 조선민주주의인민공화국 1부류축구련맹전; Hanja: 朝鮮民主主義人民共和國 一部流蹴球聯盟戰) held in the home-and-away round-robin system used in most other countries.

== Structure ==
In 1990 and 1991, South Korean Newspaper reported, DPR Korea Football League had 3 divisions and promotion and relegation system

In October 2016, South Korean Newspaper reported, AFC said "In 2017, North Korea have a plan to create a new football league system which operates 3 divisions."

Note: North Korea is a reclusive and closed country so it is difficult to obtain the information about whole changes or detailed league system information.

- Round-robin tournament competitions
  - First Division: DPR Korea Premier Football League
  - Second Division: DPR Korea balls League 2 (uncertain)
  - Third Division: DPR Korea Football League 3 (uncertain)
- Elimination tournament competitions
  - Hwaebul Cup
  - DPR Korea Championship (In the past, Round-robin tournament competition)
  - Mangyongdae Prize
  - Paektusan Prize
  - Pochonbo Torch Prize
  - Osandok Prize
