= 2018 AFC Cup group stage =

The 2018 AFC Cup group stage was played from 10 February to 16 May 2018. A total of 36 teams competed in the group stage to decide the 11 places in the knockout stage of the 2018 AFC Cup.

== Draw ==
The draw for the group stage was held on 6 December 2017, 14:00 MYT (UTC+8), at the AFC House in Kuala Lumpur, Malaysia. The 36 teams were drawn into nine groups of four: three groups each in the West Asia Zone (Groups A–C) and the ASEAN Zone (Groups F–H), and one group each in the Central Asia Zone (Group D), the South Asia Zone (Group E), and the East Asia Zone (Group I). Teams from the same association in the West Asia Zone and ASEAN Zone could not be drawn into the same group.

The seeding of each team in the draw was determined by their association and their qualifying position within their association. The mechanism of the draw was as follows:

- For the West Asia Zone, a draw was held for the five associations with two direct entrants (Iraq, Syria, Jordan, Bahrain, Lebanon) to determine the three associations occupying seeds 1 and 2, with seeds 1 placed in order for Groups A, B and C, and the two associations occupying seeds 3 and 4, with seeds 3 placed in order for Groups A and B. The remaining teams were then allocated to groups according to the rules set by AFC.
- For the ASEAN Zone, a draw was held for the five associations with two direct entrants (Vietnam, Indonesia, Myanmar, Philippines, Singapore) to determine the three associations occupying seeds 1 and 2, with seeds 1 placed in order for Groups F, G and H, and the two associations occupying seeds 3 and 4, with seeds 3 placed in Groups F and G. The remaining teams were then allocated to the groups according to the rules set by AFC.
- For the Central Asia Zone, the South Asia Zone, and the East Asia Zone, no draw was held, and the teams were allocated to the groups according to their association ranking published on 30 November 2016.

The following 36 teams entered into the group-stage draw, which included the 31 direct entrants and the five winners of the play-off round of the qualifying play-offs, whose identity was not known at the time of the draw.

Zone	Groups	Seed 1	Seed 2	Seed 3	Seed 4
West Asia Zone	A–C	(Bahrain) Malkiya (Note: The seeding of the first and second group stage teams from Iraq, Syria, Jordan, Bahrain, and Lebanon was determined by draw.)	(Bahrain) Manama	(Iraq) Al-Quwa Al-Jawiya	(Iraq) Al-Zawraa
West Asia Zone	A–C	(Lebanon) Al-Ahed	(Lebanon) Al-Ansar	(Syria) Al-Jaish	(Syria) Al-Wahda
West Asia Zone	A–C	(Jordan) Al-Faisaly	(Jordan) Al-Jazeera	(Oman) Dhofar	(Oman) Al-Suwaiq (Play-off West Asia)
Central Asia Zone	D	(Tajikistan) Istiklol	(Turkmenistan) Altyn Asyr (Note: The identity of the first group stage teams from Turkmenistan and Bangladesh, and the first and second group stage and standby teams from Philippines was not known at the time of the group-stage draw.)	(Kyrgyzstan) Alay Osh	(Turkmenistan) Ahal (Play-off Central Asia)
South Asia Zone	E	(India) Aizawl	(Maldives) New Radiant	(Bangladesh) Abahani Limited Dhaka	(India) Bengaluru (Play-off South Asia)
ASEAN Zone	F–H	(Philippines) Ceres–Negros (Note: The seeding of the first and second group stage teams from Vietnam, Indonesia, Myanmar, Philippines, and Singapore was determined by draw.)	(Philippines) Global Cebu	(Myanmar) Shan United	(Myanmar) Yangon United
ASEAN Zone	F–H	(Indonesia) Bali United	(Indonesia) Persija Jakarta	(Vietnam) FLC Thanh Hóa	(Vietnam) Sông Lam Nghệ An
ASEAN Zone	F–H	(Singapore) Tampines Rovers	(Singapore) Home United	(Malaysia) Johor Darul Ta'zim	(Cambodia) Boeung Ket Angkor (Play-off ASEAN)
East Asia Zone	I	(North Korea) April 25	(Chinese Taipei) Hang Yuen	Benfica de Macau	(North Korea) Hwaebul (Play-off East Asia)

Standby teams (Note: The standby teams would replace a team from the same association which played in the AFC Champions League qualifying play-offs and advanced to the AFC Champions League group stage. There were no standby teams from Bahrain (for Malkiya).)

- (Jordan) ~~Al-Wehdat (for Al-Faisaly)~~
- (India) ~~Mohun Bagan (for Aizawl)~~
- (Vietnam) ~~Hà Nội (for FLC Thanh Hóa)~~
- (Malaysia) ~~Selangor (for Johor Darul Ta'zim)~~
- (Indonesia) ~~Madura United (for Bali United)~~
- (Myanmar) ~~Yadanarbon (for Shan United)~~
- (Philippines) ~~Meralco Manila (for Ceres–Negros)~~ (Note: Meralco Manila, the 2017 Philippines Football League 3rd place, were supposed to be the standby team for the Philippines but the club was dissolved in January 2018.)
- (Singapore) ~~Geylang International (for Tampines Rovers)~~

== Format ==
In the group stage, each group was played on a home-and-away round-robin basis. The following teams advanced to the knockout stage:

- The winners of each group and the best runners-up in the West Asia Zone and the ASEAN Zone advanced to the Zonal semi-finals.
- The winners of each group in the Central Asia Zone, the South Asia Zone, and the East Asia Zone advanced to the Inter-zone play-off semi-finals.

=== Tiebreakers ===
The teams were ranked according to points (3 points for a win, 1 point for a draw, 0 points for a loss). If tied on points, tiebreakers were applied in the following order (Regulations Article 10.5):

1. Points in head-to-head matches among tied teams;
2. Goal difference in head-to-head matches among tied teams;
3. Goals scored in head-to-head matches among tied teams;
4. Away goals scored in head-to-head matches among tied teams;
5. If more than two teams are tied, and after applying all head-to-head criteria above, a subset of teams are still tied, all head-to-head criteria above are reapplied exclusively to this subset of teams;
6. Goal difference in all group matches;
7. Goals scored in all group matches;
8. Penalty shoot-out if only two teams are tied and they met in the last round of the group;
9. Disciplinary points (yellow card = 1 point, red card as a result of two yellow cards = 3 points, direct red card = 3 points, yellow card followed by direct red card = 4 points);
10. Team from the higher-ranked association.

== Schedule ==
The schedule of each matchday was as follows (W: West Asia Zone; C: Central Asia Zone; S: South Asia Zone; A: ASEAN Zone; E: East Asia Zone).

- Matches in the West Asia Zone were played on Mondays and Tuesdays (Matchdays 1–3: two groups on Monday, one group on Tuesday; Matchdays 4–6: one group on Monday, two groups on Tuesday).
- Matches in the ASEAN Zone were played on Tuesdays and Wednesdays (Matchdays 1–3: two groups on Tuesday, one group on Wednesday; Matchdays 4–6: one group on Tuesday, two groups on Wednesday).
- Matches in the Central Asia Zone, the South Asia Zone, and the East Asia Zone were played on Wednesdays; if two teams from the same association played at home on the same matchday, one match was moved to Tuesdays.

Matchday	Dates		Matches
Matchday	W, A	C, S, E	Matches
Matchday 1	10 & 12–14 February 2018	7 March & 5 April 2018	Team 1 vs. Team 4, Team 3 vs. Team 2
Matchday 2	26–28 February 2018	13–14 March 2018	Team 4 vs. Team 3, Team 2 vs. Team 1
Matchday 3	5–7 March & 16 April 2018	10–11 April 2018	Team 4 vs. Team 2, Team 1 vs. Team 3
Matchday 4	12–14 March & 17 April 2018	25 April 2018	Team 2 vs. Team 4, Team 3 vs. Team 1
Matchday 5	9–11 April 2018	1–2 May 2018	Team 4 vs. Team 1, Team 2 vs. Team 3
Matchday 6	23–25 April 2018	16 May 2018	Team 1 vs. Team 2, Team 3 vs. Team 4

== Groups ==
=== Group A ===
Pos	Team	Pld	W	D	L	GF	GA	GD	Pts	Qualification	JAZ	QUW	MAL	SUW
1	(Jordan) Al-Jazeera	6	4	2	0	13	6	+7	14	Zonal semi-finals	—	1–1	1–0	4–0
2	(Iraq) Al-Quwa Al-Jawiya	6	3	3	0	11	7	+4	12	Zonal semi-finals	2–2	—	1–1	2–0
3	(Bahrain) Malkiya	6	2	1	3	11	10	+1	7		1–2	3–4	—	4–1
4	(Oman) Al-Suwaiq	6	0	0	6	4	16	−12	0		2–3	0–1	1–2	—

Source: AFC
Rules for classification: Group stage tiebreakers
12 February 2018
18:00 UTC+3

Al-Quwa Al-Jawiya (Iraq)	2–2	(Jordan) Al-Jazeera
Ahmad 16' (pen.); Sadir 84'	Live Report; Stats Report	Al-Taamari 26' (pen.); Mardikian 88' (pen.)

Saoud bin Abdulrahman Stadium, Al Wakrah (Qatar) (Note: Teams from Iraq were not allowed to host their home matches in their country due to security concerns until March 2018, when the ban was lifted by FIFA.)
Attendance: 347
Referee: Nagor Amir Noor Mohamed (Malaysia)
12 February 2018
18:15 UTC+3

Malkiya (Bahrain)	4–1	(Oman) Al-Suwaiq
Hashem 21'; H. Isa 32', 71'; S. Isa 81'	Live Report; Stats Report	Al-Muqbali 45+1'

Khalifa Sports City Stadium, Isa Town
Attendance: 3,100
Referee: Kim Dae-yong (South Korea)

26 February 2018
19:00 UTC+4

Al-Suwaiq (Oman)	0–1	(Iraq) Al-Quwa Al-Jawiya
	Live Report; Stats Report	Ali 85'

Al-Seeb Stadium, Seeb
Attendance: 2,300
Referee: Sukhbir Singh (Singapore)
26 February 2018
17:00 UTC+2

Al-Jazeera (Jordan)	1–0	(Bahrain) Malkiya
Al-Taamari 60'	Live Report; Stats Report

Amman International Stadium, Amman
Attendance: 507
Referee: Omar Mohamed Al-Ali (United Arab Emirates)

5 March 2018
19:00 UTC+4

Al-Suwaiq (Oman)	2–3	(Jordan) Al-Jazeera
Dieng 33' (pen.); Al-Hajri 41'	Live Report; Stats Report	Arab 43'; Tannous 67'; Al-Taamari 70' (pen.)

Al-Seeb Stadium, Seeb
Attendance: 820
Referee: Nasrullo Kabirov (Tajikistan)
5 March 2018
18:30 UTC+3

Malkiya (Bahrain)	3–4	(Iraq) Al-Quwa Al-Jawiya
Albari 8', 9'; Hamwiah 14'	Live Report; Stats Report	Midani 28'; Radhi 70', 90+1'; Ahmad 79'

Khalifa Sports City Stadium, Isa Town
Attendance: 2,740
Referee: Yudai Yamamoto (Japan)

13 March 2018
17:00 UTC+2

Al-Jazeera (Jordan)	4–0	(Oman) Al-Suwaiq
Khairullah 39'; Al-Jafal 41'; Al-Essawi 45+3'; Tannous 85'	Live Report; Stats Report

Amman International Stadium, Amman
Attendance: 322
Referee: Mooud Bonyadifar (Iran)

10 April 2018
19:00 UTC+4

Al-Suwaiq (Oman)	1–2	(Bahrain) Malkiya
Al-Hajri 60'	Live Report; Stats Report	H. Isa 12'; Hamwiah 89' (pen.)

Al-Seeb Stadium, Seeb
Attendance: 120
Referee: Sherzod Kasimov (Uzbekistan)
10 April 2018
18:00 UTC+3

Al-Jazeera (Jordan)	1–1	(Iraq) Al-Quwa Al-Jawiya
Al-Essawi 88'	Live Report; Stats Report	Radhi 90+3'

Al-Hassan Stadium, Irbid (Note: The Al-Jazeera v Al-Quwa Al-Jawiya match was played in Al-Hassan Stadium, as the 2018 AFC Women's Asian Cup was held in Amman International Stadium in early to mid April.)
Attendance: 850
Referee: Chen Hsin-chuan (Chinese Taipei)

17 April 2018 (Note: The Al-Quwa Al-Jawiya v Malkiya match on Matchday 4 was rescheduled from 13 March to 17 April to allow Iraqi teams to play at home after their ban was lifted by the FIFA Council in March 2018.)
18:00 UTC+3

Al-Quwa Al-Jawiya (Iraq)	1–1	(Bahrain) Malkiya
Mohsin 20'	Live Report; Stats Report	Hamwiah 77'

Karbala Sports City, Karbala
Attendance: 9,870
Referee: Masoud Tufayelieh (Syria)

24 April 2018
18:00 UTC+3

Malkiya (Bahrain)	1–2	(Jordan) Al-Jazeera
Al-Teyeb 38'	Live Report; Stats Report	Al-Taamari 21' (pen.); Mardikian 56'

Khalifa Sports City Stadium, Isa Town
Attendance: 596
Referee: Timur Faizullin (Kyrgyzstan)
24 April 2018
18:00 UTC+3

Al-Quwa Al-Jawiya (Iraq)	2–0	(Oman) Al-Suwaiq
Radhi 37', 45' (pen.)	Live Report; Stats Report

Karbala Sports City, Karbala
Attendance: 4,630
Referee: Hanna Hattab (Syria)

=== Group B ===
Pos	Team	Pld	W	D	L	GF	GA	GD	Pts	Qualification	AHE	ZAW	JAI	MAN
1	(Lebanon) Al-Ahed	6	3	3	0	11	5	+6	12	Zonal semi-finals	—	1–1	1–1	3–1
2	(Iraq) Al-Zawraa	6	2	4	0	8	5	+3	10		1–1	—	0–0	2–1
3	(Syria) Al-Jaish	6	1	4	1	4	6	−2	7		1–4	1–1	—	1–0
4	(Bahrain) Manama	6	0	1	5	3	10	−7	1		0–1	1–3	0–0	—

Source: AFC
Rules for classification: Group stage tiebreakers
12 February 2018
15:00 UTC+2

Al-Ahed (Lebanon)	1–1	(Iraq) Al-Zawraa
Yakubu 67'	Live Report; Stats Report	Hadi 4'

Camille Chamoun Sports City Stadium, Beirut
Attendance: 1,235
Referee: Timur Faizullin (Kyrgyzstan)
12 February 2018 (Note: The matches between Manama and Al-Jaish on Matchdays 1 and 5 were reversed from the original schedule.)
18:30 UTC+3

Manama (Bahrain)	0–0	(Syria) Al-Jaish
	Live Report; Stats Report

Bahrain National Stadium, Riffa
Attendance: 1,221
Referee: Mohammad Arafah (Jordan)

26 February 2018
18:00 UTC+3

Al-Zawraa (Iraq)	0–0	(Syria) Al-Jaish
	Live Report; Stats Report

Hamad bin Khalifa Stadium, Doha (Qatar)
Attendance: 100
Referee: Payam Heidari (Iran)
26 February 2018
18:30 UTC+3

Manama (Bahrain)	0–1	(Lebanon) Al-Ahed
	Live Report; Stats Report	Zreik 70'

Khalifa Sports City Stadium, Isa Town
Attendance: 450
Referee: Sherzod Kasimov (Uzbekistan)

6 March 2018
15:00 UTC+2

Al-Ahed (Lebanon)	1–1	(Syria) Al-Jaish
Zreik 71'	Live Report; Stats Report	Al Owied 56'

Camille Chamoun Sports City Stadium, Beirut
Attendance: 1,150
Referee: Saoud Al-Athbah (Qatar)

12 March 2018
18:30 UTC+3

Manama (Bahrain)	1–3	(Iraq) Al-Zawraa
Abdulrahman 1'	Live Report; Stats Report	Abdul-Raheem 15'; Abdul-Amir 66'; Kalaf 79'

Bahrain National Stadium, Riffa
Attendance: 360
Referee: Yusuke Araki (Japan)
12 March 2018
18:30 UTC+3

Al-Jaish (Syria)	1–4	(Lebanon) Al-Ahed
Kalaji 90' (pen.)	Live Report; Stats Report	Kouyaté 24'; Zreik 45+2', 60'; Ayass 90+3'

Khalifa Sports City Stadium, Isa Town (Bahrain) (Note: Teams from Syria are not allowed to host their home matches in their country due to security concerns.)
Attendance: 30
Referee: Mahmood Al-Majarafi (Oman)

10 April 2018
18:00 UTC+3

Al-Zawraa (Iraq)	1–1	(Lebanon) Al-Ahed
Al-Saedi 82' (pen.)	Live Report; Stats Report	Zreik 90+5'

Karbala Sports City, Karbala
Attendance: 16,884
Referee: Nagor Amir Noor Mohamed (Malaysia)
10 April 2018
18:45 UTC+3

Al-Jaish (Syria)	1–0	(Bahrain) Manama
Kalaji 45'	Live Report; Stats Report

Khalifa Sports City Stadium, Isa Town (Bahrain)
Attendance: 300
Referee: Nasrullo Kabirov (Tajikistan)

16 April 2018 (Note: The Al-Zawraa v Manama match on Matchday 3 was rescheduled from 6 March to 16 April to allow Iraqi teams to play at home after their ban was lifted by the FIFA Council in March 2018.)
18:00 UTC+3

Al-Zawraa (Iraq)	2–1	(Bahrain) Manama
Jawda 40'; Bayesh 47'	Live Report; Stats Report	Haram 90'

Karbala Sports City, Karbala
Attendance: 6,765
Referee: Yaqoob Abdul Baki (Oman)

24 April 2018
16:30 UTC+3

Al-Ahed (Lebanon)	3–1	(Bahrain) Manama
Kouyaté 3'; Mansour 54'; Zreik 90+6' (pen.)	Live Report; Stats Report	Haji 25'

Camille Chamoun Sports City Stadium, Beirut
Attendance: 1,753
Referee: Pranjal Banerjee (India)
24 April 2018
18:45 UTC+3

Al-Jaish (Syria)	1–1	(Iraq) Al-Zawraa
Ashkar 90+4'	Live Report; Stats Report	Abdul-Raheem 62'

Bahrain National Stadium, Riffa (Bahrain)
Attendance: 100
Referee: Kim Dae-yong (South Korea)

=== Group C ===
Pos	Team	Pld	W	D	L	GF	GA	GD	Pts	Qualification	FAI	DHO	ANS	WAH
1	(Jordan) Al-Faisaly	6	4	1	1	10	5	+5	13	Zonal semi-finals	—	2–0	1–0	2–2
2	(Oman) Dhofar	6	2	2	2	4	5	−1	8		1–0	—	0–2	2–0
3	(Lebanon) Al-Ansar	6	2	1	3	6	7	−1	7		1–3	1–1	—	1–0
4	(Syria) Al-Wahda	6	1	2	3	5	8	−3	5		1–2	0–0	2–1	—

Source: AFC
Rules for classification: Group stage tiebreakers
13 February 2018
19:30 UTC+4

Dhofar (Oman)	0–2	(Lebanon) Al-Ansar
	Live Report; Stats Report	Chaito 9'; El Baba 90+1'

Salalah Sports Complex, Salalah
Attendance: 1,400
Referee: Ho Wai Sing (Hong Kong)
13 February 2018
18:00 UTC+2

Al-Faisaly (Jordan)	2–2	(Syria) Al-Wahda
Gikiewicz 74'; Al-Rawashdeh 82'	Live Report; Stats Report	Moustafa 7', 80'

Amman International Stadium, Amman
Attendance: 7,000
Referee: Takuto Okabe (Japan)

27 February 2018
14:15 UTC+2

Al-Wahda (Syria)	0–0	(Oman) Dhofar
	Live Report; Stats Report

Saida Municipal Stadium, Sidon (Lebanon)
Attendance: 1
Referee: Bijan Heidari (Iran)
27 February 2018
15:00 UTC+2

Al-Ansar (Lebanon)	1–3	(Jordan) Al-Faisaly
Tall 48'	Live Report; Stats Report	Mendy 7'; Hayel 39'; Attiah 88'

Camille Chamoun Sports City Stadium, Beirut
Attendance: 4,000
Referee: Nazmi Nasaruddin (Malaysia)

5 March 2018
14:15 UTC+2

Al-Wahda (Syria)	2–1	(Lebanon) Al-Ansar
Moustafa 37'; Al Hasan 60'	Live Report; Stats Report	Tall 12'

Saida Municipal Stadium, Sidon (Lebanon)
Attendance: 20
Referee: Dmitry Mashentsev (Kyrgyzstan)
5 March 2018
18:00 UTC+2

Al-Faisaly (Jordan)	2–0	(Oman) Dhofar
Yaseen 43'; Gikiewicz 49'	Live Report; Stats Report

Amman International Stadium, Amman
Attendance: 7,041
Referee: Khamis Al-Kuwari (Qatar)

13 March 2018
15:10 UTC+2

Al-Ansar (Lebanon)	1–0	(Syria) Al-Wahda
Tall 47'	Live Report; Stats Report

Camille Chamoun Sports City Stadium, Beirut
Attendance: 3,588
Referee: Ilgiz Tantashev (Uzbekistan)
13 March 2018
19:30 UTC+4

Dhofar (Oman)	1–0	(Jordan) Al-Faisaly
Said 40'	Live Report; Stats Report

Salalah Sports Complex, Salalah
Attendance: 1,800
Referee: Mohammed Al-Hoish (Saudi Arabia)

9 April 2018
14:15 UTC+3

Al-Wahda (Syria)	1–2	(Jordan) Al-Faisaly
Solaiman 78'	Live Report; Stats Report	Gikiewicz 40'; Al-Jbarat 90+3'

Saida Municipal Stadium, Sidon (Lebanon)
Attendance: 25
Referee: Mongkolchai Pechsri (Thailand)
9 April 2018
16:30 UTC+3

Al-Ansar (Lebanon)	1–1	(Oman) Dhofar
Krouma 17'	Live Report; Stats Report	López 15'

Camille Chamoun Sports City Stadium, Beirut
Attendance: 4,000
Referee: Kim Dae-yong (South Korea)

23 April 2018
18:00 UTC+3

Al-Faisaly (Jordan)	1–0	(Lebanon) Al-Ansar
Meha 15'	Live Report; Stats Report

Amman International Stadium, Amman
Attendance: 7,547
Referee: Mooud Bonyadifar (Iran)
23 April 2018
20:00 UTC+4

Dhofar (Oman)	2–0	(Syria) Al-Wahda
Calamari 68', 89'	Live Report; Stats Report

Salalah Sports Complex, Salalah
Attendance: 500
Referee: Yu Ming-hsun (Chinese Taipei)

=== Group D ===
Pos	Team	Pld	W	D	L	GF	GA	GD	Pts	Qualification	ALT	IST	AHA	ALA
1	(Turkmenistan) Altyn Asyr	6	4	2	0	17	7	+10	14	Inter-zone play-off semi-finals	—	2–2	1–0	5–0
2	(Tajikistan) Istiklol	6	4	1	1	10	7	+3	13		2–3	—	1–0	1–0
3	(Turkmenistan) Ahal	6	2	1	3	8	5	+3	7		0–0	0–1	—	5–0
4	(Kyrgyzstan) Alay Osh	6	0	0	6	7	23	−16	0		3–6	2–3	2–3	—

Source: AFC
Rules for classification: Group stage tiebreakers
7 March 2018
14:00 UTC+6

Alay Osh (Kyrgyzstan)	3–6	(Turkmenistan) Altyn Asyr
I. Alimov 39'; Joel 46'; M. Alimov 57'	Live Report; Stats Report	Ýagşyýew 11', 51'; Annadurdyýew 19', 40', 84'; Baýow 88'

Suyumbayev Stadion, Osh
Attendance: 2,958
Referee: Baraa Aisha (Palestine)
7 March 2018
18:00 UTC+5

Istiklol (Tajikistan)	1–0	(Turkmenistan) Ahal
Annagulyýew 25' (o.g.)	Live Report; Stats Report

Hisor Central Stadium, Hisor
Attendance: 11,000
Referee: Adel Al-Naqbi (United Arab Emirates)

13 March 2018
15:00 UTC+5

Ahal (Turkmenistan)	5–0	(Kyrgyzstan) Alay Osh
Muhadow 27', 33'; Abylow 36', 68'; Muhammedow 90+2'	Live Report; Stats Report

Sport Toplumy Stadium, Balkanabat
Attendance: 20,100
Referee: Zaid Thamer Mohammed (Iraq)
14 March 2018
16:30 UTC+5

Altyn Asyr (Turkmenistan)	2–2	(Tajikistan) Istiklol
Ýagşyýew 90'; Annadurdyýew 90+3'	Live Report; Stats Report	Zyanko 50'; Nazarov 59' (pen.)

Sport Toplumy Stadium, Balkanabat
Attendance: 8,600
Referee: Ali Reda (Lebanon)

11 April 2018
18:00 UTC+5

Ahal (Turkmenistan)	0–0	(Turkmenistan) Altyn Asyr
	Live Report; Stats Report

Ashgabat Stadium, Ashgabat
Attendance: 15,600
Referee: Ammar Mahfoodh (Bahrain)
11 April 2018
19:00 UTC+5

Istiklol (Tajikistan)	1–0	(Kyrgyzstan) Alay Osh
Fatkhuloev 48' (pen.)	Live Report; Stats Report

Hisor Central Stadium, Hisor
Attendance: 8,533
Referee: Bijan Heidari (Iran)

25 April 2018
14:00 UTC+6

Alay Osh (Kyrgyzstan)	2–3	(Tajikistan) Istiklol
Riskulov 38'; Sylla 76' (pen.)	Live Report; Stats Report	Fatkhuloev 7' (pen.); Jalilov 45'; Vasiev 90+2'

Suyumbayev Stadion, Osh
Attendance: 3,800
Referee: Yusuke Araki (Japan)
25 April 2018
17:30 UTC+5

Altyn Asyr (Turkmenistan)	1–0	(Turkmenistan) Ahal
Geldiýew 45+2'	Live Report; Stats Report

Sport Toplumy Stadium, Balkanabat
Attendance: 8,375
Referee: Ahmed Al-Ali (Jordan)

1 May 2018
18:00 UTC+5

Ahal (Turkmenistan)	0–1	(Tajikistan) Istiklol
	Live Report; Stats Report	Fatkhuloev 52'

Ashgabat Stadium, Ashgabat
Attendance: 18,456
Referee: Jansen Foo (Singapore)
2 May 2018
17:30 UTC+5

Altyn Asyr (Turkmenistan)	5–0	(Kyrgyzstan) Alay Osh
Aşyrow 7'; Annadurdyýew 25', 90+1'; Ýagşyýew 60', 69' (pen.)	Live Report; Stats Report

Sport Toplumy Stadium, Balkanabat
Attendance: 1,253
Referee: Yaqoub Al-Hammadi (United Arab Emirates)

16 May 2018
17:30 UTC+6

Alay Osh (Kyrgyzstan)	2–3	(Turkmenistan) Ahal
Sylla 17' (pen.); Mansurov 23'	Live Report; Stats Report	Annaýew 42' (pen.); Annagulyýew 66'; Akmämmedow 90+3' (pen.)

Suyumbayev Stadion, Osh
Attendance: 3,000
Referee: Kim Woo-sung (South Korea)
16 May 2018
18:00 UTC+5

Istiklol (Tajikistan)	2–3	(Turkmenistan) Altyn Asyr
Zyanko 83'; Nazarov 90+1' (pen.)	Live Report; Stats Report	Tursunow 1'; Babajanow 45+4'; Titow 90+7'

Hisor Central Stadium, Hisor
Attendance: 5,000
Referee: Omar Al-Yaqoubi (Oman)

=== Group E ===
Pos	Team	Pld	W	D	L	GF	GA	GD	Pts	Qualification	BFC	RAD	ABD	AIZ
1	(India) Bengaluru	6	5	0	1	14	3	+11	15	Inter-zone play-off semi-finals	—	1–0	1–0	5–0
2	(Maldives) New Radiant	6	4	0	2	12	5	+7	12		2–0	—	5–1	3–1
3	(Bangladesh) Abahani Limited Dhaka	6	1	1	4	5	12	−7	4		0–4	0–1	—	1–1
4	(India) Aizawl	6	1	1	4	5	16	−11	4 (Note: Head-to-head results: Aizawl 0–3 Abahani Limited Dhaka, Abahani Limited Dhaka 1–1 Aizawl.)		1–3	2–1	0–3	—

Source: AFC
Rules for classification: Group stage tiebreakers
Notes:
7 March 2018
16:15 UTC+6

Abahani Limited Dhaka (Bangladesh)	0–1	(Maldives) New Radiant
	Live Report; Stats Report	Fasir 58'

Bangabandhu National Stadium, Dhaka
Attendance: 760
Referee: Kim Hee-gon (South Korea)

14 March 2018
16:00 UTC+5

New Radiant (Maldives)	3–1	(India) Aizawl
Ashfaq 40', 77', 85'	Live Report; Stats Report	Lalramhmunmawia 33'

Rasmee Dhandu Stadium, Malé
Attendance: 1,893
Referee: Ahmad A'Qashah (Singapore)
14 March 2018
20:00 UTC+5:30

Bengaluru (India)	1–0	(Bangladesh) Abahani Limited Dhaka
Lalhlimpuia 72'	Live Report; Stats Report

Sree Kanteerava Stadium, Bangalore
Attendance: 1,051
Referee: Yaqoub Al-Hammadi (United Arab Emirates)

5 April 2018 (Note: The Aizawl v Bengaluru match on Matchday 1 was rescheduled from 7 March to 5 April to allow Bengaluru to play in the 2018 Indian Super League playoffs.)
18:30 UTC+5:30

Aizawl (India)	1–3	(India) Bengaluru
Dodoz 5'	Live Report; Stats Report	Segovia 45+1' (pen.); Bheke 63'; Lalhlimpuia 77'

Indira Gandhi Athletic Stadium, Guwahati
Attendance: 879
Referee: Ahmad Ibrahim (Jordan)

10 April 2018
20:00 UTC+5:30

Bengaluru (India)	1–0	(Maldives) New Radiant
Kumar 90+1'	Live Report; Stats Report

Sree Kanteerava Stadium, Bangalore
Attendance: 1,839
Referee: Hanna Hattab (Syria)
11 April 2018
18:30 UTC+5:30

Aizawl (India)	0–3	(Bangladesh) Abahani Limited Dhaka
	Live Report; Stats Report	Miya 2'; Alison 17'; Kojima 37'

Indira Gandhi Athletic Stadium, Guwahati
Attendance: 435
Referee: Dmitry Mashentsev (Kyrgyzstan)

25 April 2018
16:30 UTC+6

Abahani Limited Dhaka (Bangladesh)	1–1	(India) Aizawl
Onuoha 31' (pen.)	Live Report; Stats Report	Ionescu 65'

Bangabandhu National Stadium, Dhaka
Attendance: 800
Referee: Baraa Aisha (Palestine)
25 April 2018
16:00 UTC+5

New Radiant (Maldives)	2–0	(India) Bengaluru
Fasir 30'; Ashfaq 47'	Live Report; Stats Report

Rasmee Dhandu Stadium, Malé
Attendance: 3,112
Referee: Khamis Al-Kuwari (Qatar)

2 May 2018
16:00 UTC+5

New Radiant (Maldives)	5–1	(Bangladesh) Abahani Limited Dhaka
Fasir 19' (pen.), 51', 56'; Ashfaq 58', 88'	Live Report; Stats Report	Kojima 46'

Rasmee Dhandu Stadium, Malé
Attendance: 3,843
Referee: Yudai Yamamoto (Japan)
2 May 2018
20:00 UTC+5:30

Bengaluru (India)	5–0	(India) Aizawl
Chhetri 16' (pen.); Segovia 17', 62'; Singh 30'; Lalhlimpuia 89'	Live Report; Stats Report

Sree Kanteerava Stadium, Bangalore
Attendance: 1,570
Referee: Zaid Thamer Mohammed (Iraq)

16 May 2018
18:45 UTC+5:30

Aizawl (India)	2–1	(Maldives) New Radiant
Dodoz 61' (pen.); Ionescu 82'	Live Report; Stats Report	Hassan 85'

Indira Gandhi Athletic Stadium, Guwahati
Attendance: 238
Referee: Sultan Al-Marzooqi (United Arab Emirates)
16 May 2018
19:15 UTC+6

Abahani Limited Dhaka (Bangladesh)	0–4	(India) Bengaluru
	Live Report; Stats Report	Segovia 13'; Kumar 16', 58'; Chhetri 60'

Bangabandhu National Stadium, Dhaka
Attendance: 750
Referee: Suhaizi Shukri (Malaysia)

=== Group F ===
Pos	Team	Pld	W	D	L	GF	GA	GD	Pts	Qualification	HOM	CER	BKA	SHA
1	(Singapore) Home United	6	4	1	1	15	6	+9	13 (Note: Head-to-head results: Home United 1–1 Ceres–Negros, Ceres–Negros 0–2 Home United.)	Zonal semi-finals	—	1–1	6–0	3–2
2	(Philippines) Ceres–Negros	6	4	1	1	17	3	+14	13	Zonal semi-finals	0–2	—	9–0	2–0
3	(Cambodia) Boeung Ket Angkor	6	2	0	4	8	24	−16	6		3–2	0–4	—	1–2
4	(Myanmar) Shan United	6	1	0	5	5	12	−7	3		0–1	0–1	1–4	—

Source: AFC
Rules for classification: Group stage tiebreakers
Notes:
13 February 2018
16:00 UTC+6:30

Shan United (Myanmar)	0–1	(Singapore) Home United
	Live Report; Stats Report	Song Ui-young 75'

Thuwunna Stadium, Yangon
Attendance: 500
Referee: Mongkolchai Pechsri (Thailand)
13 February 2018
19:30 UTC+8

Ceres–Negros (Philippines)	9–0	(Cambodia) Boeung Ket Angkor
Uesato 15', 22'; Bienve 19', 29' (pen.); Porteria 31', 85'; Sovannarith 58' (o.g.); Carli 64'; Ma. Ott 81'	Live Report; Stats Report

Panaad Park and Stadium, Bacolod
Attendance: 2,678
Referee: Zhang Lei (China)

27 February 2018
18:30 UTC+7

Boeung Ket Angkor (Cambodia)	1–2	(Myanmar) Shan United
Maycon 28'	Live Report; Stats Report	Dway Ko Ko Chit 41'; Chizoba 55'

Olympic Stadium, Phnom Penh
Attendance: 1,635
Referee: Yusuke Araki (Japan)
27 February 2018
19:30 UTC+8

Home United (Singapore)	1–1	(Philippines) Ceres–Negros
Shahril 23' (pen.)	Live Report; Stats Report	Súper 79'

Jalan Besar Stadium, Singapore
Attendance: 1,331
Referee: Shaun Evans (Australia)

6 March 2018
18:30 UTC+7

Boeung Ket Angkor (Cambodia)	3–2	(Singapore) Home United
Maycon 11', 41' (pen.); Ajayi 13'	Live Report; Stats Report	Song Ui-young 2'; Faritz 67'

Olympic Stadium, Phnom Penh
Attendance: 626
Referee: Masoud Tufayelieh (Syria)
6 March 2018
19:30 UTC+8

Ceres–Negros (Philippines)	2–0	(Myanmar) Shan United
Reichelt 79'; Bienve 83'	Live Report; Stats Report

Panaad Park and Stadium, Bacolod
Attendance: 4,294
Referee: Ammar Mahfoodh (Bahrain)

14 March 2018
16:00 UTC+6:30

Shan United (Myanmar)	0–1	(Philippines) Ceres–Negros
	Live Report; Stats Report	Bienve 14' (pen.)

Thuwunna Stadium, Yangon
Attendance: 231
Referee: Nazmi Nasaruddin (Malaysia)
14 March 2018
19:30 UTC+8

Home United (Singapore)	6–0	(Cambodia) Boeung Ket Angkor
Shahril 37'; Song Ui-young 44'; Faritz 55'; Kumar 72', 83'; Izzdin 87'	Live Report; Stats Report

Jalan Besar Stadium, Singapore
Attendance: 767
Referee: Yu Ming-hsun (Chinese Taipei)

11 April 2018
18:30 UTC+7

Boeung Ket Angkor (Cambodia)	0–4	(Philippines) Ceres–Negros
	Live Report; Stats Report	Bienve 36', 38', 69'; Uesato 84'

Olympic Stadium, Phnom Penh
Attendance: 315
Referee: Mohammad Arafah (Jordan)
11 April 2018
19:30 UTC+8

Home United (Singapore)	3–2	(Myanmar) Shan United
Faizal 19'; Song Ui-young 25'; Shahril 39'	Live Report; Stats Report	Zin Min Tun 9'; Chizoba 28'

Jalan Besar Stadium, Singapore
Attendance: 1,015
Referee: Kim Woo-sung (Korea Republic)

25 April 2018
18:00 UTC+8

Ceres–Negros (Philippines)	0–2	(Singapore) Home United
	Live Report; Stats Report	Izzdin 80'; Song Ui-young 90+4' (pen.)

Panaad Park and Stadium, Bacolod
Attendance: 5,015
Referee: Hussein Abo Yehia (Lebanon)
25 April 2018
16:30 UTC+6:30

Shan United (Myanmar)	1–4	(Cambodia) Boeung Ket Angkor
Zin Min Tun 78'	Live Report; Stats Report	Maycon 11', 63'; Oiboh 25'; Ajayi 47'

Thuwunna Stadium, Yangon
Attendance: 100
Referee: Ho Wai Sing (Hong Kong)

=== Group G ===
Pos	Team	Pld	W	D	L	GF	GA	GD	Pts	Qualification	YAN	GLO	THA	BAL
1	(Myanmar) Yangon United	6	4	1	1	15	9	+6	13	Zonal semi-finals	—	3–0	2–1	3–2
2	(Philippines) Global Cebu	6	2	2	2	9	10	−1	8		2–1	—	3–3	1–1
3	(Vietnam) FLC Thanh Hóa	6	1	3	2	9	11	−2	6		3–3	1–0	—	0–0
4	(Indonesia) Bali United	6	1	2	3	8	11	−3	5		1–3	1–3	3–1	—

Source: AFC
Rules for classification: Group stage tiebreakers
10 February 2018 (Note: The FLC Thanh Hóa v Global Cebu match was brought forward from 13 February to 10 February.)
16:30 UTC+7

FLC Thanh Hóa (Vietnam)	1–0	(Philippines) Global Cebu
Faye 74'	Live Report; Stats Report

Mỹ Đình National Stadium, Hanoi
Attendance: 4,566
Referee: Chen Hsin-chuan (Chinese Taipei)
13 February 2018
15:30 UTC+8

Bali United (Indonesia)	1–3	(Myanmar) Yangon United
Sukadana 45+1'	Live Report; Stats Report	Uzochukwu 15'; Sylla 18', 25'

Kapten I Wayan Dipta Stadium, Gianyar
Attendance: 10,542
Referee: Ammar Mahfoodh (Bahrain)

27 February 2018
15:30 UTC+6:30

Yangon United (Myanmar)	2–1	(Vietnam) FLC Thanh Hóa
Uchida 67'; Aee Soe 87'	Live Report; Stats Report	Faye 5'

Thuwunna Stadium, Yangon
Attendance: 1,350
Referee: Hasan Akrami (Iran)
27 February 2018
19:30 UTC+8

Global Cebu (Philippines)	1–1	(Indonesia) Bali United
Dizon 11'	Live Report; Stats Report	Spasojević 74'

Rizal Memorial Stadium, Manila
Attendance: 365
Referee: Suhaizi Shukri (Malaysia)

7 March 2018
15:30 UTC+8

Bali United (Indonesia)	3–1	(Vietnam) FLC Thanh Hóa
Yabes 66'; Demerson 72'; Lilipaly 74'	Live Report; Stats Report	Karube 30'

Kapten I Wayan Dipta Stadium, Gianyar
Attendance: 6,899
Referee: Hanna Hattab (Syria)
7 March 2018
15:30 UTC+6:30

Yangon United (Myanmar)	3–0	(Philippines) Global Cebu
Maung Maung Lwin 45+3'; Sylla 48', 57'	Live Report; Stats Report

Thuwunna Stadium, Yangon
Attendance: 815
Referee: Omar Al-Yaqoubi (Oman)

13 March 2018
18:00 UTC+7

FLC Thanh Hóa (Vietnam)	0–0	(Indonesia) Bali United
	Live Report; Stats Report

Mỹ Đình National Stadium, Hanoi
Attendance: 4,725
Referee: Omar Mohamed Al-Ali (United Arab Emirates)
13 March 2018
19:30 UTC+8

Global Cebu (Philippines)	2–1	(Myanmar) Yangon United
Roberts 79'; Rufo 90+5' (pen.)	Live Report; Stats Report	Maung Maung Lwin 90'

Rizal Memorial Stadium, Manila
Attendance: 150
Referee: Takuto Okabe (Japan)

11 April 2018
15:30 UTC+6:30

Yangon United (Myanmar)	3–2	(Indonesia) Bali United
Maung Maung Lwin 44'; Uzochukwu 58'; Sylla 73'	Live Report; Stats Report	Spasojević 11'; Sukarja 36'

Thuwunna Stadium, Yangon
Attendance: 670
Referee: Shukri Al-Hunfush (Saudi Arabia)
11 April 2018
19:30 UTC+8

Global Cebu (Philippines)	3–3	(Vietnam) FLC Thanh Hóa
Rufo 6'; Wesley 82'; Roberts 90'	Live Report; Stats Report	Ofere 2'; Thanh Bình 25'; Đình Tùng 57'

Rizal Memorial Stadium, Manila
Attendance: 287
Referee: Ahmad A'Qashah (Singapore)

25 April 2018
19:00 UTC+8

Bali United (Indonesia)	1–3	(Philippines) Global Cebu
van der Velden 71'	Live Report; Stats Report	Rufo 2', 45+1'; Mulders 33'

Kapten I Wayan Dipta Stadium, Gianyar
Attendance: 2,154
Referee: Lau Fong Hei (Hong Kong)
25 April 2018
18:00 UTC+7

FLC Thanh Hóa (Vietnam)	3–3	(Myanmar) Yangon United
Faye 11'; Lê Văn Thắng 38'; Karube 80'	Live Report; Stats Report	Sylla 4', 22'; Thein Zaw 61'

Mỹ Đình National Stadium, Hanoi
Attendance: 1,225
Referee: Masoud Tufayelieh (Syria)

=== Group H ===
Pos	Team	Pld	W	D	L	GF	GA	GD	Pts	Qualification	PSJ	SLN	JDT	TAM
1	(Indonesia) Persija Jakarta	6	4	1	1	13	6	+7	13	Zonal semi-finals	—	1–0	4–0	4–1
2	(Vietnam) Sông Lam Nghệ An	6	3	1	2	8	5	+3	10 (Note: Head-to-head results: Sông Lam Nghệ An 2–0 Johor Darul Ta'zim, Johor Darul Ta'zim 3–2 Sông Lam Nghệ An.)		0–0	—	2–0	2–1
3	(Malaysia) Johor Darul Ta'zim	6	3	1	2	8	9	−1	10		3–0	3–2	—	2–1
4	(Singapore) Tampines Rovers	6	0	1	5	5	14	−9	1		2–4	0–2	0–0	—

Source: AFC
Rules for classification: Group stage tiebreakers
Notes:
10 February 2018 (Note: The Tampines Rovers v Sông Lam Nghệ An match was brought forward from 14 February to 10 February.)
19:30 UTC+8

Tampines Rovers (Singapore)	0–2	(Vietnam) Sông Lam Nghệ An
	Live Report; Stats Report	Hồ Phúc Tịnh 49'; Hồ Khắc Ngọc 71'

Jalan Besar Stadium, Singapore
Attendance: 1,450
Referee: Mohammed Al-Hoish (Saudi Arabia)
14 February 2018
20:45 UTC+8

Johor Darul Ta'zim (Malaysia)	3–0	(Indonesia) Persija Jakarta
Hazwan 29'; Díaz 42'; Safawi 76'	Live Report; Stats Report

Larkin Stadium, Johor Bahru
Attendance: 18,600
Referee: Saoud Al-Athbah (Qatar)

28 February 2018
15:30 UTC+7

Sông Lam Nghệ An (Vietnam)	2–0	(Malaysia) Johor Darul Ta'zim
Phan Văn Đức 22'; Phạm Xuân Mạnh 90+4'	Live Report; Stats Report

Vinh Stadium, Vinh
Attendance: 6,000
Referee: Mahmood Al-Majarafi (Oman)
28 February 2018
18:30 UTC+7

Persija Jakarta (Indonesia)	4–1	(Singapore) Tampines Rovers
Šimić 12', 74', 86'; Rezaldi 41'	Live Report; Stats Report	Khairul 77'

Gelora Bung Karno Stadium, Jakarta
Attendance: 49,056
Referee: Kim Woo-sung (South Korea)

6 March 2018
15:30 UTC+7

Sông Lam Nghệ An (Vietnam)	0–0	(Indonesia) Persija Jakarta
	Live Report; Stats Report

Vinh Stadium, Vinh
Attendance: 10,000
Referee: Çarymyrat Kurbanow (Turkmenistan)
6 March 2018
19:30 UTC+8

Tampines Rovers (Singapore)	0–0	(Malaysia) Johor Darul Ta'zim
	Live Report; Stats Report

Jalan Besar Stadium, Singapore
Attendance: 2,250
Referee: Hussein Abo Yehia (Lebanon)

14 March 2018
18:30 UTC+7

Persija Jakarta (Indonesia)	1–0	(Vietnam) Sông Lam Nghệ An
Addison 90+3'	Live Report; Stats Report

Gelora Bung Karno Stadium, Jakarta
Attendance: 46,184
Referee: Ho Wai Sing (Hong Kong)
14 March 2018
20:45 UTC+8

Johor Darul Ta'zim (Malaysia)	2–1	(Singapore) Tampines Rovers
Safawi 13'; Hazwan 79'	Live Report; Stats Report	Khairul 45' (pen.)

Larkin Stadium, Johor Bahru
Attendance: 8,750
Referee: Payam Heidari (Iran)

10 April 2018
15:30 UTC+7

Sông Lam Nghệ An (Vietnam)	2–1	(Singapore) Tampines Rovers
Olaha 16'; Hồ Tuấn Tài 75'	Live Report; Stats Report	Irfan 38'

Vinh Stadium, Vinh
Attendance: 5,590
Referee: Yaqoub Al-Hammadi (United Arab Emirates)
10 April 2018
18:30 UTC+7

Persija Jakarta (Indonesia)	4–0	(Malaysia) Johor Darul Ta'zim
Šimić 8', 12', 19', 87' (pen.)	Live Report; Stats Report

Gelora Bung Karno Stadium, Jakarta
Attendance: 60,157
Referee: Sivakorn Pu-udom (Thailand)

24 April 2018
20:00 UTC+8

Tampines Rovers (Singapore)	2–4	(Indonesia) Persija Jakarta
Webb 27'; Fazrul 80'	Live Report; Stats Report	Rezaldi 23'; Šimić 45+1'; Setiawan 51'; Addison 72'

Jalan Besar Stadium, Singapore
Attendance: 1,260
Referee: Rowan Arumughan (India)
24 April 2018
20:00 UTC+8

Johor Darul Ta'zim (Malaysia)	3–2	(Vietnam) Sông Lam Nghệ An
Safawi 36'; Syafiq 39'; Safiq 67' (pen.)	Live Report; Stats Report	Nguyễn Viết Nguyên 41'; Hồ Tuấn Tài 45+1'

Larkin Stadium, Johor Bahru
Attendance: 5,170
Referee: Kim Hee-gon (South Korea)

=== Group I ===
Pos	Team	Pld	W	D	L	GF	GA	GD	Pts	Qualification	APR	BEN	HWA	HAN
1	(North Korea) April 25	6	6	0	0	23	2	+21	18	Inter-zone play-off semi-finals	—	8–0	1–0	5–1
2	Benfica de Macau	6	4	0	2	13	15	−2	12		0–2	—	3–0	3–2
3	(North Korea) Hwaebul	6	2	0	4	9	10	−1	6		0–2	2–3	—	6–1
4	(Chinese Taipei) Hang Yuen	6	0	0	6	6	24	−18	0		1–5	1–4	0–1	—

Source: AFC
Rules for classification: Group stage tiebreakers
7 March 2018
16:00 UTC+8:30

April 25 (North Korea)	1–0	(North Korea) Hwaebul
An Il-bom 84'	Live Report; Stats Report

Rungrado 1st of May Stadium, Pyongyang
Attendance: 12,430
Referee: Sivakorn Pu-udom (Thailand)
7 March 2018
20:00 UTC+8

Benfica de Macau	3–2	(Chinese Taipei) Hang Yuen
Nguema 49'; Leonel 61', 64'	Live Report; Stats Report	Chen Ching-hsuan 19', 34'

Estádio Campo Desportivo, Macau
Attendance: 1,200
Referee: Shukri Al-Hunfush (Saudi Arabia)

14 March 2018
15:00 UTC+8:30

Hwaebul (North Korea)	2–3	Benfica de Macau
Jong Chol-hyok 13' (pen.); Pak Chol-song 49'	Live Report; Stats Report	Leonel 7', 75'; Tetteh 43'

Kim Il-sung Stadium, Pyongyang
Attendance: 22,000
Referee: Timur Faizullin (Kyrgyzstan)
14 March 2018
19:00 UTC+8

Hang Yuen (Chinese Taipei)	1–5	(North Korea) April 25
Liu Yung-sheng 74'	Live Report; Stats Report	Om Chol-song 43'; An Il-bom 45+2', 58'; Rim Chol-min 55'; Ri Hyong-jin 88'

Fu Jen Catholic University Stadium, New Taipei
Attendance: 914
Referee: Ahmed Al-Ali (Jordan)

10 April 2018
15:00 UTC+8:30

Hwaebul (North Korea)	6–1	(Chinese Taipei) Hang Yuen
Jon Chung-il 19'; Ri Yong-gwon 36'; Yen Ting-yung 50' (o.g.); Jong Chol-hyok 58'; Ri Song 72'; Ri Jong-min 88'	Live Report; Stats Report	Liu Chia-ming 55'

Kim Il-sung Stadium, Pyongyang
Attendance: 4,000
Referee: Zhang Lei (China)
11 April 2018
17:00 UTC+8:30

April 25 (North Korea)	8–0	Benfica de Macau
Kim Yu-song 13', 64', 77', 79'; Ri Hyong-jin 21', 82'; An Il-bom 55', 68'	Live Report; Stats Report

Rungrado 1st of May Stadium, Pyongyang
Attendance: 3,645
Referee: Hussein Abo Yehia (Lebanon)

25 April 2018
19:00 UTC+8

Hang Yuen (Chinese Taipei)	0–1	(North Korea) Hwaebul
	Live Report; Stats Report	Jon Chung-il 79'

Fu Jen Catholic University Stadium, New Taipei
Attendance: 369
Referee: Ali Shaban (Kuwait)
25 April 2018
20:00 UTC+8

Benfica de Macau	0–2	(North Korea) April 25
	Live Report; Stats Report	An Il-bom 24', 31' (pen.)

Estádio Campo Desportivo, Macau
Attendance: 550
Referee: Omar Mohamed Al-Ali (United Arab Emirates)

2 May 2018
15:00 UTC+8:30

Hwaebul (North Korea)	0–2	(North Korea) April 25
	Live Report; Stats Report	An Il-bom 19'; Kim Yu-song 24'

Kim Il-sung Stadium, Pyongyang
Attendance: 1,200
Referee: Mahmood Al-Majarafi (Oman)
2 May 2018
19:00 UTC+8

Hang Yuen (Chinese Taipei)	1–4	Benfica de Macau
Chen Ching-hsuan 19'	Live Report; Stats Report	Torrão 11', 89'; Huang Shih-yuan 25' (o.g.); Teixeira 77'

Fu Jen Catholic University Stadium, New Taipei
Attendance: 388
Referee: Ali Reda (Lebanon)

16 May 2018
19:30 UTC+9

April 25 (North Korea)	5–1	(Chinese Taipei) Hang Yuen
Lin Shih-kai 25' (o.g.), 40' (o.g.); Rim Chol-min 28', 77'; Kim Jong-chol 34'	Live Report; Stats Report	Alexandre 26'

Rungrado 1st of May Stadium, Pyongyang
Attendance: 1,000
Referee: Mongkolchai Pechsri (Thailand)
16 May 2018
19:00 UTC+8

Benfica de Macau	3–0	(North Korea) Hwaebul
Leonel 42', 63', 82' (pen.)	Live Report; Stats Report

Estádio Campo Desportivo, Macau
Attendance: 350
Referee: Shaun Evans (Australia)

== Ranking of second-placed teams ==
=== West Asia Zone ===
Pos	Grp	Team	Pld	W	D	L	GF	GA	GD	Pts	Qualification
1	A	(Iraq) Al-Quwa Al-Jawiya	6	3	3	0	11	7	+4	12	Zonal semi-finals
2	B	(Iraq) Al-Zawraa	6	2	4	0	8	5	+3	10	
3	C	(Oman) Dhofar	6	2	2	2	4	5	−1	8	

Source: AFC

=== ASEAN Zone ===
Pos	Grp	Team	Pld	W	D	L	GF	GA	GD	Pts	Qualification
1	F	(Philippines) Ceres–Negros	6	4	1	1	17	3	+14	13	Zonal semi-finals
2	H	(Vietnam) Sông Lam Nghệ An	6	3	1	2	8	5	+3	10	
3	G	(Philippines) Global Cebu	6	2	2	2	9	10	−1	8	

Source: AFC
