= 2018 AFC Cup final =

- Event: 2018 AFC Cup
Al-Quwa Al-Jawiya	Altyn Asyr
(Iraq)	(Turkmenistan)
2	0
- Date: 27 October 2018
- Venue: Basra Sports City, Basra
- Man of the Match: Hammadi Ahmad (Al-Quwa Al-Jawiya)
- Referee: Abdulrahman Al-Jassim (Qatar)
- Attendance: 24,665
- Weather: 19 °C (66 °F)

The 2018 AFC Cup final was the final match of the 2018 AFC Cup, the 15th edition of the AFC Cup, Asia's secondary club football tournament organized by the Asian Football Confederation (AFC).

The final was contested as a single match between Al-Quwa Al-Jawiya from Iraq and Altyn Asyr from Turkmenistan. The match was hosted by Al-Quwa Al-Jawiya at the Basra Sports City in Basra on 27 October 2018.

Al-Quwa Al-Jawiya won the final 2–0 for their third consecutive and overall AFC Cup title.

== Teams ==
Team	Zone	Previous finals appearances (bold indicates winners)
(Iraq) Al-Quwa Al-Jawiya	West Asia Zone (WAFF)	2 (**2016**, **2017**)
(Turkmenistan) Altyn Asyr	Central Asia Zone (CAFA) (Inter-zone play-off winner)	None

This was Al-Quwa Al-Jawiya's third consecutive AFC Cup final, a record shared with Al-Faisaly (2005 to 2007) and Al-Kuwait (2011 to 2013). If they were to win the final, they would become the first team to win three consecutive AFC Cup titles, and also tie Al-Kuwait as record three-time winners of the AFC Cup.

Altyn Asyr were the first team from Turkmenistan to reach the AFC Cup final. If they were to win the final, they would become the second team from Central Asia to win the AFC Cup, after Nasaf from Uzbekistan in 2011.

== Venue ==
Basra Sports City in Basra, Iraq, hosted the match.

This was the second AFC Cup final played in Iraq, after the 2012 final played at the Franso Hariri Stadium in Arbil. While Al-Quwa Al-Jawiya were also the home team in the 2016 AFC Cup Final, they hosted the match at the Suheim Bin Hamad Stadium in Doha, Qatar, as Iraqi teams were not allowed to host their home matches during that time. The ban was lifted in March 2018, and Al-Quwa Al-Jawiya played their subsequent home matches at the Karbala Sports City in Karbala.

== Road to the final ==
Note: In all results below, the score of the finalist is given first (H: home; A: away).

(Iraq) Al-Quwa Al-Jawiya				Round		(Turkmenistan) Altyn Asyr			
Opponent	Result			Group stage		Opponent	Result		
(Jordan) Al-Jazeera	2–2 (H)			Matchday 1		(Kyrgyzstan) Alay Osh	6–3 (A)		
(Oman) Al-Suwaiq	1–0 (A)			Matchday 2		(Tajikistan) Istiklol	2–2 (H)		
(Bahrain) Malkiya	4–3 (A)			Matchday 3		(Turkmenistan) Ahal	0–0 (A)		
(Jordan) Al-Jazeera	1–1 (A)			Matchday 4		(Turkmenistan) Ahal	1–0 (H)		
(Bahrain) Malkiya	1–1 (H)			Matchday 5		(Kyrgyzstan) Alay Osh	5–0 (H)		
(Oman) Al-Suwaiq	2–0 (H)			Matchday 6		(Tajikistan) Istiklol	3–2 (A)		
**Group A runners-up**: Pos / Team / Pld / Pts; 1 / (Jordan) Al-Jazeera / 6 / **14**; **2** / (Iraq) Al-Quwa Al-Jawiya / **6** / **12**; 3 / (Bahrain) Malkiya / 6 / **7**; 4 / (Oman) Al-Suwaiq / 6 / **0**; Source: AFC				Final standings		**Group D winners**: Pos / Team / Pld / Pts; **1** / (Turkmenistan) Altyn Asyr / **6** / **14**; 2 / (Tajikistan) Istiklol / 6 / **13**; 3 / (Turkmenistan) Ahal / 6 / **7**; 4 / (Kyrgyzstan) Alay Osh / 6 / **0**; Source: AFC			
Opponent	Agg.	1st leg	2nd leg	Knockout stage		Opponent	Agg.	1st leg	2nd leg
(Lebanon) Al-Ahed	5–3	3–1 (H)	2–2 (A)	Zonal semi-finals	Inter-zone play-off semi-finals	(India) Bengaluru	5–2	3–2 (A)	2–0 (H)
(Jordan) Al-Jazeera	4–1	1–0 (A)	3–1 (H)	Zonal finals	Inter-zone play-off final	(North Korea) April 25	3–3 (a)	2–2 (A)	1–1 (H)

== Format ==
The final was played as a single match, with the host team (winners of the West Asia Zonal final) alternated from the previous season's final.

If tied after regulation, extra time and, if necessary, penalty shoot-out was used to decide the winner.

== Match ==
=== Details ===
27 October 2018
19:00 UTC+3

Al-Quwa Al-Jawiya (Iraq)	2–0	(Turkmenistan) Altyn Asyr
Ahmad 22'; Bayesh 57'	Live Report; Stats Report

Basra Sports City, Basra
Attendance: 24,665
Referee: Abdulrahman Al-Jassim (Qatar)

**Al-Quwa Al-Jawiya**	**Altyn Asyr**

GK	12	(Iraq) Mohammed Gassid
RB	6	(Iraq) Sameh Saeed
CB	5	(Iraq) Ahmed Abdul-Ridha
CB	32	(Iraq) Saad Natiq
LB	33	(Iraq) Ali Bahjat	(yellow card) 88'
RM	37	(Iraq) Ibrahim Bayesh
CM	18	(Syria) Zaher Midani
CM	42	(Iraq) Mohammed Ali Abboud		(substituted off) 77'
LM	38	(Iraq) Ali Husni		(substituted off) 81'
CF	10	(Iraq) Hammadi Ahmad (c)
CF	9	(Iraq) Emad Mohsin		(substituted off) 90+1'
Substitutes:
GK	1	(Iraq) Fahad Talib
DF	34	(Iraq) Mustafa Mohammed
MF	14	(Iraq) Mohsen Abdullah
MF	43	(Iraq) Mohammed Qasim		(substituted on) 77'
FW	7	(Iraq) Karrar Ali		(substituted on) 81'
FW	17	(Iraq) Ali Yousif
FW	29	(Iraq) Amjad Radhi		(substituted on) 90+1'
Manager:
(Iraq) Basim Qasim

GK	1	(Turkmenistan) Mammet Orazmuhammedow
RB	12	(Turkmenistan) Serdar Annaorazow
CB	4	(Turkmenistan) Mekan Saparow
CB	2	(Turkmenistan) Zafar Babajanow	(substituted off) 46'
LB	24	(Turkmenistan) Gurbangeldi Batyrow	(substituted off) 77'
CM	14	(Turkmenistan) Umidjan Astanow
CM	29	(Turkmenistan) Serdar Geldiýew (c)
RW	22	(Turkmenistan) Mekan Aşyrow	(substituted off) 58'
AM	10	(Turkmenistan) Selim Nurmuradov
LW	7	(Turkmenistan) Altymyrat Annadurdyýew
CF	39	(Turkmenistan) Wahyt Orazsähedow
Substitutes:
GK	16	(Turkmenistan) Nurgeldi Astanow
DF	3	(Turkmenistan) Şöhrat Söýünow	(substituted on) 46'
MF	20	(Turkmenistan) Begmyrat Baýow	(substituted on) 58'
MF	27	(Turkmenistan) Welmyrat Ballakow
MF	33	(Turkmenistan) Annasähet Annasähedow
FW	18	(Turkmenistan) Furkat Tursunow	(substituted on) 77'
FW	30	(Turkmenistan) Mihail Titow
Manager:
(Turkmenistan) Ýazguly Hojageldyýew

Man of the Match:
Hammadi Ahmad (Al-Quwa Al-Jawiya)

Assistant referees:
Taleb Al-Marri (Qatar)
Saoud Al-Maqaleh (Qatar)
Fourth official:
Khamis Al-Marri (Qatar)
Fifth official:
Juma Al-Burshaid (Qatar)

**Match rules**

- 90 minutes.
- 30 minutes of extra time if tied.
- Penalty shoot-out if still tied after extra time.
- Seven named substitutes, of which up to three may be used.

== See also ==
- 2018 AFC Champions League Final
