= 2018 AFC Cup knockout stage =

International football tournament

The 2018 AFC Cup knockout stage was played from 7 May to 27 October 2018. A total of 11 teams competed in the knockout stage to decide the champions of the 2018 AFC Cup.

== Qualified teams ==
The following teams advanced from the group stage:

- The winners of each of the three groups and the best runners-up in the West Asia Zone (Groups A–C) and the ASEAN Zone (Groups F–H) advanced to the Zonal semi-finals.
- The winners of each group in the Central Asia Zone (Group D), the South Asia Zone (Group E), and the East Asia Zone (Group I) advanced to the Inter-zone play-off semi-finals.

Key to colours
Teams which enter the Inter-zone play-off semi-finals
Teams which enter the Zonal semi-finals

Zone	Group	Winners	Best runners-up
West Asia Zone	A	(Jordan) Al-Jazeera	(Iraq) Al-Quwa Al-Jawiya (Group A)
West Asia Zone	B	(Lebanon) Al-Ahed	(Iraq) Al-Quwa Al-Jawiya (Group A)
West Asia Zone	C	(Jordan) Al-Faisaly	(Iraq) Al-Quwa Al-Jawiya (Group A)
Central Asia Zone	D	(Turkmenistan) Altyn Asyr	—
South Asia Zone	E	(India) Bengaluru	—
ASEAN Zone	F	(Singapore) Home United	(Philippines) Ceres–Negros (Group F)
ASEAN Zone	G	(Myanmar) Yangon United	(Philippines) Ceres–Negros (Group F)
ASEAN Zone	H	(Indonesia) Persija Jakarta	(Philippines) Ceres–Negros (Group F)
East Asia Zone	I	(North Korea) April 25	—

== Format ==
In the knockout stage, the 11 teams played a single-elimination tournament. Each tie was played on a home-and-away two-legged basis, except the final which was played as a single match. The away goals rule (for two-legged ties), extra time (away goals do not apply in extra time) and penalty shoot-out were used to decide the winner if necessary (Regulations Article 11.3).

== Schedule ==
The schedule of each round was as follows (W: West Asia Zone; A: ASEAN Zone). Matches in the West Asia Zone were played on Mondays and Tuesdays, while matches in the ASEAN Zone and the Inter-zone play-offs were played on Tuesdays and Wednesdays.

Round	First leg	Second leg
Zonal semi-finals	7–9 May 2018 (W, A)	14–16 May 2018 (W, A)
Zonal finals	1 August 2018 (A), 18 September 2018 (W)	8 August 2018 (A), 2 October 2018 (W)
Inter-zone play-off semi-finals	21–22 August 2018	28–29 August 2018
Inter-zone play-off final	19 September 2018	3 October 2018
Final	27 October 2018	

== Bracket ==
The bracket of the knockout stage was determined as follows:

Round	Matchups
Zonal semi-finals	(Matchups and order of legs determined by identity of best runners-up: first team listed host first leg, second team listed host second leg) West Asia Zone: If best runners-up from Group A; WSF1: Winner Group A vs. Winner Group C; WSF2: Runner-up Group A vs. Winner Group B; If best runners-up from Group B; WSF1: Winner Group B vs. Winner Group A; WSF2: Runner-up Group B vs. Winner Group C; If best runners-up from Group C; WSF1: Winner Group C vs. Winner Group B; WSF2: Runner-up Group C vs. Winner Group A; ASEAN Zone: If best runners-up from Group F; ASF1: Winner Group F vs. Winner Group H; ASF2: Runner-up Group F vs. Winner Group G; If best runners-up from Group G; ASF1: Winner Group G vs. Winner Group F; ASF2: Runner-up Group G vs. Winner Group H; If best runners-up from Group H; ASF1: Winner Group H vs. Winner Group G; ASF2: Runner-up Group H vs. Winner Group F
Zonal finals	(Order of legs decided by draw) West Asia Zone: WF: Winner WSF1 vs. Winner WSF2; ASEAN Zone: AF: Winner ASF1 vs. Winner ASF2
Inter-zone play-off semi-finals	(Matchups and order of legs decided by draw, involving Winner Group D, Winner Group E, Winner Group I, and Winner AF): IZSF1; IZSF2
Inter-zone play-off final	(Winner IZSF1 host first leg, Winner IZSF2 host second leg): IZF: Winner IZSF1 vs. Winner IZSF2
Final	(Winner WF host match, as alternated from previous season's final): Winner WF vs. Winner IZF

The bracket was decided after the draw for the Zonal finals and the Inter-zone play-off semi-finals, which was held on 23 May 2018, 15:00 MYT (UTC+8), at the AFC House in Kuala Lumpur, Malaysia.

Zonal semi-finals
(Jordan) Al-Jazeera	1	1	2
(Jordan) Al-Faisaly	1	0	1
(Iraq) Al-Quwa Al-Jawiya	3	2	5
(Lebanon) Al-Ahed	1	2	3
(Philippines) Ceres–Negros	4	2	6
(Myanmar) Yangon United	2	3	5
(Singapore) Home United	3	3	6
(Indonesia) Persija Jakarta	2	1	3

Zonal finals
(Jordan) Al-Jazeera	0	1	1
(Iraq) Al-Quwa Al-Jawiya	1	3	4
(Philippines) Ceres–Negros	1	0	1
(Singapore) Home United	1	2	3

Inter-zone play-off semi-finals
(Singapore) Home United	0	1	1
(North Korea) April 25	2	9	11
(India) Bengaluru	2	0	2
(Turkmenistan) Altyn Asyr	3	2	5

Inter-zone play-off final
(North Korea) April 25	2	1	3
(Turkmenistan) Altyn Asyr (a)	2	1	3

Final
(Iraq) Al-Quwa Al-Jawiya	2
(Turkmenistan) Altyn Asyr	0

== Zonal semi-finals ==
=== Summary ===
In the Zonal semi-finals, the four qualified teams from the West Asia Zone (Groups A–C) played in two ties, and the four qualified teams from the ASEAN Zone (Groups F–H) played in two ties, with the matchups and order of legs determined by the group stage draw and the identity of the best runners-up.

West Asia Zone
Team 1	Agg.	Team 2	1st leg	2nd leg
Al-Jazeera (Jordan)	2–1	(Jordan) Al-Faisaly	1–1	1–0
Al-Quwa Al-Jawiya (Iraq)	5–3	(Lebanon) Al-Ahed	3–1	2–2

ASEAN Zone
Team 1	Agg.	Team 2	1st leg	2nd leg
Home United (Singapore)	6–3	(Indonesia) Persija Jakarta	3–2	3–1
Ceres–Negros (Philippines)	6–5	(Myanmar) Yangon United	4–2	2–3

=== West Asia Zone ===
7 May 2018
19:00 UTC+3

Al-Jazeera (Jordan)	1–1	(Jordan) Al-Faisaly
Al-Taamari 14'	Live Report; Stats Report	Gikiewicz 42'

Amman International Stadium, Amman
Attendance: 1,113
Referee: Kim Hee-gon (South Korea)
14 May 2018
20:00 UTC+3

Al-Faisaly (Jordan)	0–1	(Jordan) Al-Jazeera
	Live Report; Stats Report	Al-Taamari 51'

Amman International Stadium, Amman
Attendance: 15,150
Referee: Liu Kwok Man (Hong Kong)

Al-Jazeera won 2–1 on aggregate.

8 May 2018
18:00 UTC+3

Al-Quwa Al-Jawiya (Iraq)	3–1	(Lebanon) Al-Ahed
Radhi 5'; Ahmad 89'; Sadir 90+5' (pen.)	Live Report; Stats Report	Kdouh 90+8'

Karbala Sports City, Karbala
Attendance: 10,683
Referee: Rowan Arumughan (India)
15 May 2018
15:00 UTC+3

Al-Ahed (Lebanon)	2–2	(Iraq) Al-Quwa Al-Jawiya
Kdouh 69'; Zreik 77'	Live Report; Stats Report	Ahmad 23'; Mohsin 34'

Camille Chamoun Sports City Stadium, Beirut
Attendance: 2,157
Referee: Valentin Kovalenko (Uzbekistan)

Al-Quwa Al-Jawiya won 5–3 on aggregate.

=== ASEAN Zone ===
8 May 2018
19:30 UTC+8

Home United (Singapore)	3–2	(Indonesia) Persija Jakarta
Maman 2' (o.g.); Song Ui-young 9'; Hafiz 79'	Live Report; Stats Report	Ramdani 32', 49'

Jalan Besar Stadium, Singapore
Attendance: 1,528
Referee: Mooud Bonyadifar (Iran)
15 May 2018
19:30 UTC+7

Persija Jakarta (Indonesia)	1–3	(Singapore) Home United
Šimić 9' (pen.)	Live Report; Stats Report	Shahril 6', 12'; Song Ui-young 44'

Gelora Bung Karno Stadium, Jakarta
Attendance: 62,198
Referee: Turki Al-Khudhayr (Saudi Arabia)

Home United won 6–3 on aggregate.

9 May 2018
19:30 UTC+8

Ceres–Negros (Philippines)	4–2	(Myanmar) Yangon United
Bienve 29', 44'; Reichelt 33'; Súper 63'	Live Report; Stats Report	Sylla 55, 83'

Panaad Park and Stadium, Bacolod
Attendance: 8,986
Referee: Aziz Asimov (Uzbekistan)
16 May 2018
15:30 UTC+6:30

Yangon United (Myanmar)	3–2	(Philippines) Ceres–Negros
Uchida 2'; Aee Soe 83'; Sylla 87' (pen.)	Live Report; Stats Report	Ma. Ott 8'; Bienve 78'

Thuwunna Stadium, Yangon
Attendance: 2,481
Referee: Ko Hyung-jin (South Korea)

Ceres–Negros won 6–5 on aggregate.

== Zonal finals ==
=== Summary ===
The draw for the Zonal finals was held on 23 May 2018. In the Zonal finals, the two winners of West Asia Zonal semi-finals played each other, and the two winners of ASEAN Zonal semi-finals played each other, with the order of legs decided by draw. The winners of the West Asia Zonal final advanced to the final, while the winners of the ASEAN Zonal final advanced to the Inter-zone play-off semi-finals.

West Asia Zone
Team 1	Agg.	Team 2	1st leg	2nd leg
Al-Jazeera (Jordan)	1–4	(Iraq) Al-Quwa Al-Jawiya	0–1	1–3

ASEAN Zone
Team 1	Agg.	Team 2	1st leg	2nd leg
Ceres–Negros (Philippines)	1–3	(Singapore) Home United	1–1	0–2

=== West Asia Zone ===
18 September 2018
19:00 UTC+3

Al-Jazeera (Jordan)	0–1	(Iraq) Al-Quwa Al-Jawiya
	Live Report; Stats Report	Ahmad 64'

Amman International Stadium, Amman
Attendance: 2,100
Referee: Aziz Asimov (Uzbekistan)
2 October 2018
19:00 UTC+3

Al-Quwa Al-Jawiya (Iraq)	3–1	(Jordan) Al-Jazeera
Ahmad 48', 57'; Qasim 89'	Live Report; Stats Report	Tannous 86'

Karbala Sports City, Karbala
Attendance: 14,883
Referee: Masoud Tufayelieh (Syria)

Al-Quwa Al-Jawiya won 4–1 on aggregate.

=== ASEAN Zone ===
1 August 2018
19:30 UTC+8

Ceres–Negros (Philippines)	1–1	(Singapore) Home United
Powell 8' (pen.)	Live Report; Stats Report	Cernak 23'

Panaad Park and Stadium, Bacolod
Attendance: 6,705
Referee: Kim Woo-sung (South Korea)
8 August 2018
19:30 UTC+8

Home United (Singapore)	2–0	(Philippines) Ceres–Negros
Shakir 62'; Song Ui-young 74'	Live Report; Stats Report

Jalan Besar Stadium, Singapore
Attendance: 3,392
Referee: Sivakorn Pu-udom (Thailand)

Home United won 3–1 on aggregate.

== Inter-zone play-off semi-finals ==
=== Summary ===
The draw for the Inter-zone play-off semi-finals was held on 23 May 2018. In the Inter-zone play-off semi-finals, the four zonal winners other than the West Asia Zone played in two ties, i.e., the winners of the Central Asia Zone (Group D), the winners of the South Asia Zone (Group E), the winners of the East Asia Zone (Group I), and the winners of the ASEAN Zonal final (whose identity was not known at the time of the draw), with the matchups and order of legs decided by draw, without any seeding.

Team 1	Agg.	Team 2	1st leg	2nd leg
Home United (Singapore)	1–11	(North Korea) April 25	0–2	1–9
Bengaluru (India)	2–5	(Turkmenistan) Altyn Asyr	2–3	0–2

=== Matches ===
21 August 2018
19:30 UTC+8

Home United (Singapore)	0–2	(North Korea) April 25
	Live Report; Stats Report	Pak Myong-song 62'; An Il-bom 81'

Jalan Besar Stadium, Singapore
Attendance: 2,856
Referee: Khamis Al-Marri (Qatar)
28 August 2018
17:00 UTC+9

April 25 (North Korea)	9–1	(Singapore) Home United
Om Chol-song 24', 40', 45+2' (pen.); Rim Chol-min 30'; An Il-bom 50' (pen.), 65'; Han Song-hyok 61'; Son Phyong-il 79'; Yun Il-gwang 84'	Live Report; Stats Report	Song Ui-young 19'

Kim Il-sung Stadium, Pyongyang
Attendance: 3,000
Referee: Yaqoob Abdul Baki (Oman)

April 25 won 11–1 on aggregate.

22 August 2018
20:00 UTC+5:30

Bengaluru (India)	2–3	(Turkmenistan) Altyn Asyr
Bheke 63'; Paartalu 88'	Live Report; Stats Report	Orazsähedow 11', 46'; Annadurdyýew 25'

Sree Kanteerava Stadium, Bangalore
Attendance: 5,832
Referee: Jumpei Iida (Japan)
29 August 2018
16:30 UTC+5

Altyn Asyr (Turkmenistan)	2–0	(India) Bengaluru
Annadurdyýew 50'; Orazsähedow 58'	Live Report; Stats Report

Köpetdag Stadium, Ashgabat
Attendance: 12,326
Referee: Turki Al-Khudhayr (Saudi Arabia)

Altyn Asyr won 5–2 on aggregate.

== Inter-zone play-off final ==
=== Summary ===
In the Inter-zone play-off final, the two winners of the Inter-zone play-off semi-finals played each other, with the order of legs determined by the Inter-zone play-off semi-final draw. The winners of the Inter-zone play-off final advanced to the final.

Team 1	Agg.	Team 2	1st leg	2nd leg
April 25 (North Korea)	3–3 (a)	(Turkmenistan) Altyn Asyr	2–2	1–1

=== Matches ===
19 September 2018
17:00 UTC+9

April 25 (North Korea)	2–2	(Turkmenistan) Altyn Asyr
An Il-bom 15'; Kim Yu-song 32'	Live Report; Stats Report	Orazsähedow 20'; Nurmyradow 81'

Kim Il-sung Stadium, Pyongyang
Attendance: 4,200
Referee: Ahmed Al-Kaf (Oman)
3 October 2018
17:00 UTC+5

Altyn Asyr (Turkmenistan)	1–1	(North Korea) April 25
Orazsähedow 64' (pen.)	Live Report; Stats Report	Han Song-hyok 7'

Köpetdag Stadium, Ashgabat
Attendance: 11,750
Referee: Ammar Al-Jeneibi (United Arab Emirates)

3–3 on aggregate. Altyn Asyr won on away goals.

== Final ==
In the final, the winners of the West Asia Zonal final and the winners of the Inter-zone play-off final played each other, with the host team (winners of the West Asia Zonal final) alternated from the previous season's final.

27 October 2018
19:00 UTC+3

Al-Quwa Al-Jawiya (Iraq)	2–0	(Turkmenistan) Altyn Asyr
Ahmad 22'; Bayesh 57'	Live Report; Stats Report

Basra Sports City, Basra
Attendance: 24,665
Referee: Abdulrahman Al-Jassim (Qatar)
