= 2018 AFC Cup qualifying play-offs =

Asia football competition

The 2018 AFC Cup qualifying play-offs were played from 22 January to 20 February 2018. A total of 13 teams competed in the qualifying play-offs to decide five of the 36 places in the group stage of the 2018 AFC Cup.

== Teams ==
The following 13 teams, split into five zones (West Asia Zone, Central Asia Zone, South Asia Zone, ASEAN Zone, East Asia Zone), entered the qualifying play-offs, consisting of two rounds:

- 6 teams entered in the preliminary round.
- 7 teams entered in the play-off round.

Zone	Teams entering in play-off round	Teams entering in preliminary round
West Asia Zone	(Oman) Al-Suwaiq; (Palestine) Hilal Al-Quds	
Central Asia Zone	(Tajikistan) Khujand	(Turkmenistan) Ahal (Note: The identity of the play-off teams from Turkmenistan, Bangladesh and Cambodia was not known at the time of the group stage draw.); (Kyrgyzstan) Dordoi
South Asia Zone		(India) Bengaluru; (Maldives) TC Sports; (Bangladesh) Saif; (Bhutan) Transport United
ASEAN Zone	(Laos) Lao Toyota (Note: On 14 December 2017, the AFC announced that Lao Toyota, the play-off team from Laos, were ruled ineligible to play in the 2018 AFC Cup due to match manipulation during the 2015 and 2016 AFC Cup. Lao Toyota appealed the decision to the Court of Arbitration for Sport (CAS), and on 17 January 2018, CAS ruled Lao Toyota would be eligible to participate.); (Cambodia) Boeung Ket Angkor	
East Asia Zone	(North Korea) Hwaebul; (Mongolia) Erchim	

== Format ==
In the qualifying play-offs, each tie was played on a home-and-away two-legged basis. The away goals rule, extra time (away goals do not apply in extra time) and penalty shoot-out were used to decide the winner if necessary (Regulations Article 9.3). The five winners of the play-off round advanced to the group stage to join the 31 direct entrants.

== Schedule ==
The schedule of each round was as follows (W: West Asia Zone; C: Central Asia Zone; S: South Asia Zone; A: ASEAN Zone; E: East Asia Zone).

Round	W		A		C, S, E	
Round	First leg	Second leg	First leg	Second leg	First leg	Second leg
Preliminary round	Not played				23 January 2018	30 January 2018
Play-off round	22 January 2018	29 January 2018	29 January 2018	2 February 2018	13 February 2018	20 February 2018

== Bracket ==
The bracket of the qualifying play-offs for each zone was determined by the AFC based on the association ranking of each team, with the team from the higher-ranked association hosting the second leg.

=== Play-off West Asia ===
- (Oman) Al-Suwaiq advanced to Group A.

Play-off round
(Palestine) Hilal Al-Quds	0	1	1
(Oman) Al-Suwaiq	1	1	2

=== Play-off Central Asia ===
- (Turkmenistan) Ahal advanced to Group D.

Preliminary round				Play-off round
(Kyrgyzstan) Dordoi	1	2	3
(Turkmenistan) Ahal	3	2	5
(Turkmenistan) Ahal	3	2	5	(Turkmenistan) Ahal	1	2	3
				(Tajikistan) Khujand	0	0	0

=== Play-off South Asia ===
- (India) Bengaluru advanced to Group E.

Preliminary round
(Bangladesh) Saif	0	1	1
(Maldives) TC Sports	1	3	4
(Bhutan) Transport United	0	0	0
(India) Bengaluru	0	3	3

Play-off round
(Maldives) TC Sports	2	0	2
(India) Bengaluru	3	5	8

=== Play-off ASEAN ===
- (Cambodia) Boeung Ket Angkor advanced to Group F.

Play-off round
(Cambodia) Boeung Ket Angkor	3	1	4
(Laos) Lao Toyota	3	0	3

=== Play-off East Asia ===
- (North Korea) Hwaebul advanced to Group I.

Play-off round
(Mongolia) Erchim	0	0	0
(North Korea) Hwaebul	4	3	7

== Preliminary round ==
=== Summary ===
A total of six teams played in the preliminary round.

Central Asia Zone
Team 1	Agg.	Team 2	1st leg	2nd leg
Dordoi (Kyrgyzstan)	3–5	(Turkmenistan) Ahal	1–3	2–2

South Asia Zone
Team 1	Agg.	Team 2	1st leg	2nd leg
Transport United (Bhutan)	0–3	(India) Bengaluru	0–0	0–3
Saif (Bangladesh)	1–4	(Maldives) TC Sports	0–1	1–3

=== Central Asia Zone ===
23 January 2018
15:00 UTC+6

Dordoi (Kyrgyzstan)	1–3	(Turkmenistan) Ahal
Zhyrgalbek Uulu 19'	Stats Report	Muhadow 1'; Annaýew 75', 86'

Dordoi Stadium, Bishkek
Attendance: 1,000
Referee: Hussein Abo Yehia (Lebanon)
30 January 2018
15:00 UTC+5

Ahal (Turkmenistan)	2–2	(Kyrgyzstan) Dordoi
Hajyýew 39' (pen.); Muhadow 88'	Stats Report	Gurbani 58', 69'

Sport Toplumy Stadium, Balkanabat
Attendance: 6,670
Referee: Khamis Al-Kuwari (Qatar)

Ahal won 5–3 on aggregate.

=== South Asia Zone ===
23 January 2018
18:00 UTC+6

Transport United (Bhutan)	0–0	(India) Bengaluru
	Stats Report

Changlimithang Stadium, Thimphu
Attendance: 3,100
Referee: Sivakorn Pu-udom (Thailand)
30 January 2018
20:00 UTC+5:30

Bengaluru (India)	3–0	(Bhutan) Transport United
B. Haokip 27'; Lalhlimpuia 54'; T. Haokip 62'	Stats Report

Sree Kanteerava Stadium, Bangalore
Attendance: 1,167
Referee: Mooud Bonyadifar (Iran)

Bengaluru won 3–0 on aggregate.

23 January 2018
15:00 UTC+6

Saif (Bangladesh)	0–1	(Maldives) TC Sports
	Stats Report	Vlasichev 26'

Bangabandhu National Stadium, Dhaka
Attendance: 7,000
Referee: Yaqoob Abdul Baki (Oman)
30 January 2018
21:00 UTC+5

TC Sports (Maldives)	3–1	(Bangladesh) Saif
Vlasichev 23', 84' (pen.), 88'	Stats Report	Chigozie 33'

Rasmee Dhandu Stadium, Malé
Attendance: 4,000
Referee: Çarymyrat Kurbanow (Turkmenistan)

TC Sports won 4–1 on aggregate.

== Play-off round ==
=== Summary ===
A total of 10 teams played in the play-off round: seven teams which entered in this round, and three winners of the preliminary round.

West Asia Zone
Team 1	Agg.	Team 2	1st leg	2nd leg
Hilal Al-Quds (Palestine)	1–2	(Oman) Al-Suwaiq	0–1	1–1

Central Asia Zone
Team 1	Agg.	Team 2	1st leg	2nd leg
Ahal (Turkmenistan)	3–0	(Tajikistan) Khujand	1–0	2–0

South Asia Zone
Team 1	Agg.	Team 2	1st leg	2nd leg
TC Sports (Maldives)	2–8	(India) Bengaluru	2–3	0–5

ASEAN Zone
Team 1	Agg.	Team 2	1st leg	2nd leg
Boeung Ket Angkor (Cambodia)	4–3	(Laos) Lao Toyota	3–3	1–0

East Asia Zone
Team 1	Agg.	Team 2	1st leg	2nd leg
Erchim (Mongolia)	0–7	(North Korea) Hwaebul	0–4	0–3

=== West Asia Zone ===
22 January 2018
17:00 UTC+2

Hilal Al-Quds (Palestine)	0–1	(Oman) Al-Suwaiq
	Stats Report	Al-Busaidi 26'

Arab American University Stadium, Jenin
Attendance: 1,450
Referee: Dmitry Mashentsev (Kyrgyzstan)
29 January 2018
19:00 UTC+4

Al-Suwaiq (Oman)	1–1	(Palestine) Hilal Al-Quds
Al-Muqbali 69'	Stats Report	Yameen 19'

Al-Seeb Stadium, Seeb
Attendance: 4,300
Referee: Hanna Hattab (Syria)

Al-Suwaiq won 2–1 on aggregate.

=== Central Asia Zone ===
13 February 2018
15:00 UTC+5

Ahal (Turkmenistan)	1–0	(Tajikistan) Khujand
Annaýew 18' (pen.)	Stats Report

Sport Toplumy Stadium, Balkanabat
Attendance: 9,300
Referee: Ahmed Al-Ali (Jordan)
20 February 2018
14:00 UTC+5

Khujand (Tajikistan)	0–2	(Turkmenistan) Ahal
	Stats Report	Ylýasow 49'; Muhadow 52'

20 Years of Independence Stadium, Khujand
Attendance: 25,000
Referee: Nivon Robesh Gamini (Sri Lanka)

Ahal won 3–0 on aggregate.

=== South Asia Zone ===
13 February 2018
21:00 UTC+5

TC Sports (Maldives)	2–3	(India) Bengaluru
Vlasichev 71'; Mahudhee 73'	Stats Report	T. Haokip 51', 78'; Paartalu 69'

Rasmee Dhandu Stadium, Malé
Attendance: 890
Referee: Ilgiz Tantashev (Uzbekistan)
20 February 2018
20:00 UTC+5:30

Bengaluru (India)	5–0	(Maldives) TC Sports
Dovale 12', 35', 48'; Paartalu 36'; Bheke 90+1'	Stats Report

Sree Kanteerava Stadium, Bangalore
Attendance: 1,473
Referee: Turki Al-Khudhayr (Saudi Arabia)

Bengaluru won 8–2 on aggregate.

=== ASEAN Zone ===
29 January 2018
18:30 UTC+7

Boeung Ket Angkor (Cambodia)	3–3	(Laos) Lao Toyota
Maycon 6' (pen.), 53'; Laboravy 60'	Stats Report	Honma 30', 87'; Pooda 79'

Olympic Stadium, Phnom Penh
Attendance: 1,778
Referee: Yu Ming-hsun (Chinese Taipei)
2 February 2018
18:00 UTC+7

Lao Toyota (Laos)	0–1	(Cambodia) Boeung Ket Angkor
	Stats Report	Laboravy 61'

New Laos National Stadium, Vientiane
Attendance: 450
Referee: Nagor Amir Noor Mohamed (Malaysia)

Boeung Ket Angkor won 4–3 on aggregate.

=== East Asia Zone ===
13 February 2018
14:00 UTC+8

Erchim (Mongolia)	0–4	(North Korea) Hwaebul
	Stats Report	Ri Chang-ho 9', 90'; Ri Song 41'; Ri Il-san 85'

MFF Football Centre, Ulaanbaatar
Attendance: 335
Referee: Pranjal Banerjee (India)
20 February 2018
15:00 UTC+8:30

Hwaebul (North Korea)	3–0	(Mongolia) Erchim
Jang Kuk-chol 27'; Choe Kwang-jin 41'; Jon Chung-il 45+1'	Stats Report

Kim Il-sung Stadium, Pyongyang
Attendance: 31,010
Referee: Jansen Foo (Singapore)

Hwaebul won 7–0 on aggregate.
