= 2018 AFC Cup =

15th secondary club football tournament organized by the

- The Basra International Stadium in Basra hosted the final

Tournament details
- Dates: 22 January – 27 October 2018
- Teams: 44 (from 26 associations)

Final positions
- Champions: (Iraq) Al-Quwa Al-Jawiya (3rd title)
- Runners-up: (Turkmenistan) Altyn Asyr

Tournament statistics
- Matches played: 143
- Goals scored: 452 (3.16 per match)
- Attendance: 827,013 (5,783 per match)
- Top scorer: (North Korea) An Il-bom (12 goals)
- Best player: (Iraq) Hammadi Ahmad

The 2018 AFC Cup was the 15th edition of the AFC Cup, Asia's secondary club football tournament organized by the Asian Football Confederation (AFC).

Al-Quwa Al-Jawiya from Iraq won the title for the third consecutive year, defeating Altyn Asyr from Turkmenistan in the final.

== Association team allocation ==
The AFC Competitions Committee recommended a new format for the AFC Cup starting from 2017 which was played in the AFC's five zones: West Asia, Central Asia, South Asia, ASEAN, and East Asia, with the winner of the West Asia Zone and the winner of an inter-zone play-off between the other four zones playing in the final, hosted on a rotational basis at venues in the East and West. The 46 AFC member associations (excluding the associate member Northern Mariana Islands) were ranked based on their national team's and clubs' performance over the last four years in AFC competitions, with the allocation of slots for the 2017 and 2018 editions of the AFC club competitions determined by the 2016 AFC rankings (Entry Manual Article 2.2):

- The associations were split into five zones:
  - West Asia Zone consists of the associations from the West Asian Football Federation (WAFF).
  - Central Asia Zone consists of the associations from Central Asian Football Association (CAFA).
  - South Asia Zone consists of the associations from the South Asian Football Federation (SAFF).
  - ASEAN Zone consists of the associations from the ASEAN Football Federation (AFF).
  - East Asia Zone consists of the associations from the East Asian Football Federation (EAFF).
- All associations which do not receive direct slots in the AFC Champions League group stage are eligible to enter the AFC Cup.
- In each zone, the number of groups in the group stage is determined based on the number of entries, with the number of slots filled through play-offs same as the number of groups:
  - In the West Asia Zone and the ASEAN Zone, there are three groups in the group stage, including a total of 9 direct slots, with the 3 remaining slots filled through play-offs.
  - In the Central Asia Zone, the South Asia Zone, and the East Asia Zone, there was one group in the group stage, including a total of 3 direct slots, with the 1 remaining slot filled through play-offs.
- The top associations participating in the AFC Cup in each zone as per the AFC rankings got at least one direct slot in the group stage (including losers of the AFC Champions League qualifying play-offs), while the remaining associations get only play-off slots:
  - For the West Asia Zone and the ASEAN zone:
    - The associations ranked 1st to 3rd each got two direct slots.
    - The associations ranked 4th to 6th each got one direct slot and one play-off slot.
    - The associations ranked 7th or below each got one play-off slot.
  - For the Central Asia Zone, the South Asia Zone, and the East Asia zone:
    - The associations ranked 1st to 3rd each got one direct slot and one play-off slot.
    - The associations ranked 4th or below each got one play-off slot.
- The maximum number of slots for each association was one-third of the total number of eligible teams in the top division.
- If any association gives up its direct slots, they were redistributed to the highest eligible association, with each association limited to a maximum of two direct slots.
- If any association gives up its play-off slots, they were annulled and not redistributed to any other association.
- If the number of teams in the play-offs in any zone was fewer than twice the number of group stage slots filled through play-offs, the play-off teams of the highest eligible associations were given byes to the group stage.

For the 2018 AFC Cup, the associations were allocated slots according to their association ranking published on 30 November 2016, which took into account their performance in the AFC Champions League and the AFC Cup, as well as their national team's FIFA World Rankings between 2013 and 2016.

Participation for 2018 AFC Cup
Participated
Not participated

West Asia Zone
Rank		Member Association	Points	Slots		
Rank		Member Association	Points	Group stage	Play-off	
Zone	AFC	Member Association	Points	Group stage	Play-off round	Prelim. round
1	10	Iraq	37.240	2	0	0
—	11	Kuwait	36.457	0	0	0
2	13	Syria	34.257	2	0	0
3	15	Jordan	31.213	2	0	0
4	19	Bahrain	27.353	2	0	0
5	20	Lebanon	22.077	2	0	0
6	22	Oman	19.313	1	1	0
7	28	Palestine	12.342	0	1	0
—	33	Yemen	6.926	0	0	0
Total				11	2	0
Total				11	2	
Total				13		

Central Asia Zone
Rank		Member Association	Points	Slots		
Rank		Member Association	Points	Group stage	Play-off	
Zone	AFC	Member Association	Points	Group stage	Play-off round	Prelim. round
1	23	Tajikistan	18.328	1	1	0
2	29	Turkmenistan	11.514	1	0	1
3	31	Kyrgyzstan	10.307	1	0	1
—	32	Afghanistan	7.114	0	0	0
Total				3	1	2
Total				3	3	
Total				6		

South Asia Zone
Rank		Member Association	Points	Slots		
Rank		Member Association	Points	Group stage	Play-off	
Zone	AFC	Member Association	Points	Group stage	Play-off round	Prelim. round
1	18	India	27.930	1	0	1
2	26	Maldives	15.345	1	0	1
3	37	Bangladesh	4.158	1	0	1
4	38	Bhutan	3.877	0	0	1
—	39	Nepal	3.388	0	0	0
—	44	(Sri Lanka) Sri Lanka	1.656	0	0	0
—	45	Pakistan	1.506	0	0	0
Total				3	0	4
Total				3	4	
Total				7		

ASEAN Zone
Rank		Member Association	Points	Slots		
Rank		Member Association	Points	Group stage	Play-off	
Zone	AFC	Member Association	Points	Group stage	Play-off round	Prelim. round
1	16	Vietnam	29.273	2	0	0
2	17	Malaysia	28.865	1	0	0
3	21	Indonesia	20.372	2	0	0
4	24	Myanmar	17.220	2	0	0
5	25	Philippines	17.188	2	0	0
6	27	Singapore	13.664	2	0	0
7	34	Laos	6.886	0	1	0
8	36	Cambodia	4.856	0	1	0
—	42	Brunei	2.785	0	0	0
—	43	(Timor-Leste) East Timor	2.409	0	0	0
Total				11	2	0
Total				11	0	
Total				13		

East Asia Zone
Rank		Member Association	Points	Slots		
Rank		Member Association	Points	Group stage	Play-off	
Zone	AFC	Member Association	Points	Group stage	Play-off round	Prelim. round
1	30	(North Korea) North Korea	10.314	1	1	0
2	35	(Chinese Taipei) Chinese Taipei	5.609	1	0	0
3	40	Macau	3.087	1	0	0
—	41	Guam	3.049	0	0	0
4	46	Mongolia	1.430	0	1	0
Total				3	2	0
Total				3	2	
Total				5		

Notes

1. Afghanistan (AFG): Afghanistan did not implement the club licensing system.
2. Brunei (BRU): Brunei did not implement the club licensing system.
3. Chinese Taipei (TPE): Chinese Taipei had only one entry, as only one team obtained an AFC licence.
4. Guam (GUM): Guam did not comply with the AFC Cup club licensing system.
5. Iraq (IRQ): Iraq entered the AFC Cup instead of the AFC Champions League as they did not implement the AFC Champions League club licensing system.
6. Kuwait (KUW): Kuwait could not enter due to FIFA's suspension of the Kuwait Football Association at the entry deadline.
7. Laos (LAO): Laos originally had one entry: Lao Toyota, the 2017 Lao Premier League champions. However, on 14 December 2017, the AFC announced that they were ruled ineligible to play in the 2018 AFC Cup due to match manipulation during the 2015 and 2016 AFC Cup. As they were the only team from Laos which obtained an AFC licence, no other teams were eligible to replace them. Lao Toyota appealed the decision to the Court of Arbitration for Sport (CAS), and on 17 January 2018, CAS ruled Lao Toyota would be eligible to participate.
8. Macau (MAC): Macau had only one entry, as only one team obtained an AFC licence.
9. Malaysia (MAS): Malaysia had only one entry as Pahang, the 2017 Malaysia Super League runners-up, which would have entered the group stage, decided not to participate in the AFC Cup after obtaining an AFC licence, and as a result, the second group stage slot for Malaysia was annulled and could not be filled by any other team from Malaysia (Entry Manual 12.12).
10. Nepal (NEP): Nepal did not comply with the AFC Cup club licensing system.
11. Pakistan (PAK): Pakistan could not enter due to FIFA's suspension of the Pakistan Football Federation at the entry deadline.
12. Sri Lanka (SRI): Sri Lanka did not comply with the AFC Cup club licensing system.
13. Timor-Leste (TLS): Timor-Leste did not implement the club licensing system.
14. Yemen (YEM): Yemen did not implement the club licensing system.

== Teams ==
The following 44 teams from 26 associations entered the competition.

West Asia ZoneGroup stage direct entrants (Groups A–C)
Team	Qualifying method	App (Last)
(Iraq) Al-Quwa Al-Jawiya	2016–17 Iraqi Premier League champions	3rd (2017)
(Iraq) Al-Zawraa	2016–17 Iraq FA Cup winners	4th (2017)
(Syria) Al-Jaish	2016–17 Syrian Premier League champions	8th (2017)
(Syria) Al-Wahda	2017 Syrian Cup winners	7th (2017)
(Jordan) Al-Faisaly	2016–17 Jordan League champions 2016–17 Jordan FA Cup winners	9th (2016)
(Jordan) Al-Jazeera	2016–17 Jordan League runners-up	2nd (2015)
(Bahrain) Malkiya	2016–17 Bahrain First Division League champions	1st
(Bahrain) Manama	2016–17 Bahraini King's Cup winners	1st
(Lebanon) Al-Ahed	2016–17 Lebanese Premier League champions	8th (2016)
(Lebanon) Al-Ansar	2016–17 Lebanese FA Cup winners	5th (2013)
(Oman) Dhofar	2016–17 Oman Professional League champions	4th (2013)

Qualifying play-off participants: Entering in play-off round
Team	Qualifying method	App (Last)
(Oman) Al-Suwaiq	2016–17 Sultan Qaboos Cup winners	6th (2017)
(Palestine) Hilal Al-Quds	2016–17 West Bank Premier League champions	2nd (2015)

Central Asia ZoneGroup stage direct entrants (Group D)
Team	Qualifying method	App (Last)
(Tajikistan) Istiklol	2017 Tajik League champions	4th (2017)
(Turkmenistan) Altyn Asyr	2017 Ýokary Liga champions	4th (2017)
(Kyrgyzstan) Alay Osh	2017 Kyrgyzstan League champions	4th (2017)

Qualifying play-off participants: Entering in play-off round
Team	Qualifying method	App (Last)
(Tajikistan) Khujand	2017 Tajik Cup winners	2nd (2016)

Qualifying play-off participants: Entering in preliminary round
Team	Qualifying method	App (Last)
(Turkmenistan) Ahal	2017 Turkmenistan Cup winners	2nd (2015)
(Kyrgyzstan) Dordoi	2017 Kyrgyzstan Cup winners	3rd (2017)

South Asia ZoneGroup stage direct entrants (Group E)
Team	Qualifying method	App (Last)
(India) Aizawl	2016–17 I-League champions	1st
(Maldives) New Radiant	2017 Dhivehi Premier League champions 2017 Maldives FA Cup winners	9th (2016)
(Bangladesh) Abahani Limited Dhaka	2017–18 Bangladesh Premier League champions 2017 Bangladesh Federation Cup winners	2nd (2017)

Qualifying play-off participants: Entering in preliminary round
Team	Qualifying method	App (Last)
(India) Bengaluru	2016–17 Indian Federation Cup winners	4th (2017)
(Maldives) TC Sports	2017 Dhivehi Premier League runners-up	1st
(Bangladesh) Saif	2017–18 Bangladesh Premier League 4th place	1st
(Bhutan) Transport United	2017 Bhutan National League champions	1st

ASEAN ZoneGroup stage direct entrants (Groups F–H)
Team	Qualifying method	App (Last)
(Vietnam) FLC Thanh Hóa	2017 V.League 1 runners-up	1st
(Vietnam) Sông Lam Nghệ An	2017 Vietnamese Cup winners	3rd (2012)
(Malaysia) Johor Darul Ta'zim	2017 Malaysia Super League champions	5th (2017)
(Indonesia) Bali United	2017 Liga 1 runners-up	1st
(Indonesia) Persija Jakarta	2017 Liga 1 4th place	1st
(Myanmar) Shan United	2017 Myanmar National League champions 2017 General Aung San Shield winners	1st
(Myanmar) Yangon United	2017 Myanmar National League runners-up	5th (2016)
(Philippines) Ceres–Negros	2017 Philippines Football League champions	4th (2017)
(Philippines) Global Cebu	2017 Philippines Football League runners-up	3rd (2017)
(Singapore) Tampines Rovers	2017 S.League runners-up	10th (2017)
(Singapore) Home United	2017 S.League 3rd place	9th (2017)

Qualifying play-off participants: Entering in play-off round
Team	Qualifying method	App (Last)
(Laos) Lao Toyota	2017 Lao Premier League champions	4th (2017)
(Cambodia) Boeung Ket Angkor	2017 Cambodian League champions	2nd (2017)

East Asia ZoneGroup stage direct entrants (Group I)
Team	Qualifying method	App (Last)
(North Korea) April 25	2017 DPR Korea League champions	2nd (2017)
(Chinese Taipei) Hang Yuen	2017 Taiwan Premier League 3rd place	1st
Benfica de Macau	2017 Liga de Elite champions	3rd (2017)

Qualifying play-off participants: Entering in play-off round
Team	Qualifying method	App (Last)
(North Korea) Hwaebul	2017 DPR Korea League runners-up	1st
(Mongolia) Erchim	2017 Mongolian Premier League champions	2nd (2017)

Notes

1. AFC Champions League (ACL): Teams played in the AFC Champions League qualifying play-offs, but failed to advance to the AFC Champions League group stage. Had they advanced to the AFC Champions League group stage, they would not have played in the AFC Cup and would have been replaced in the AFC Cup group stage by the standby team from the same association if such team was available.
2. Bangladesh (BAN): Sheikh Jamal, the 2017–18 Bangladesh Premier League runners-up, failed to obtain an AFC license. As a result, Saif, the league 4th place and the highest-placed team with an AFC license not yet qualified, entered the qualifying play-offs.
3. Chinese Taipei (TPE): Tatung and Taipower, the 2017 Taiwan Premier League champions and runners-up, failed to obtain an AFC license. As a result, Hang Yuen, the league 3rd place and the only team with an AFC license, entered the group stage.
4. Indonesia (IDN): Bhayangkara and PSM Makassar, the 2017 Liga 1 champions and 3rd place, failed to obtain an AFC license. As a result, Persija Jakarta, the league 4th place, entered the group stage.
5. Singapore (SIN): Albirex Niigata Singapore, the 2017 S.League champions and 2017 Singapore Cup winners, is a satellite team of Japanese club Albirex Niigata and thus ineligible to represent Singapore in AFC club competitions. As a result, Home United, the league 3rd place, entered the group stage.
6. Vietnam (VIE): Quảng Nam, the 2017 V.League 1 champions, failed to obtain an AFC licence. As a result, FLC Thanh Hóa, the league runners-up, entered the group stage.
7. North Korea (PRK): Sobaeksu, 2017 Hwaebul Cup winners, failed to obtain an AFC licence. As a result, Hwaebul, the league runners-up, entered the group stage.
8. Location of teams of the 2018 AFC Cup.
  West Asia Zone
  Central Asia Zone
  South Asia Zone
  ASEAN Zone
  East Asia Zone
  (p) Qualifying play-off participants

== Schedule ==
The schedule of the competition was as follows (W: West Asia Zone; C: Central Asia Zone; S: South Asia Zone; A: ASEAN Zone; E: East Asia Zone).

Stage	Round	Draw date	First leg	Second leg
Preliminary stage	Preliminary round	No draw	23 January 2018 (C, S)	30 January 2018 (C, S)
Play-off stage	Play-off round	No draw	22 January 2018 (W), 29 January 2018 (A), 13 February 2018 (C, S, E)	29 January 2018 (W), 2 February 2018 (A), 20 February 2018 (C, S, E)
Group stage	Matchday 1	6 December 2017	10 & 12–14 February 2018 (W, A), 7 March & 5 April 2018(C, S, E)	
Group stage	Matchday 2	6 December 2017	26–28 February 2018 (W, A), 13–14 March 2018 (C, S, E)	
Group stage	Matchday 3	6 December 2017	5–7 March & 16 April 2018 (W, A), 10–11 April 2018 (C, S, E)	
Group stage	Matchday 4	6 December 2017	12–14 March & 17 April 2018 (W, A), 25 April 2018 (C, S, E)	
Group stage	Matchday 5	6 December 2017	9–11 April 2018 (W, A), 1–2 May 2018 (C, S, E)	
Group stage	Matchday 6	6 December 2017	23–25 April 2018 (W, A), 16 May 2018 (C, S, E)	
Knockout stage	Zonal semi-finals	6 December 2017	7–9 May 2018 (W, A)	14–16 May 2018 (W, A)
Knockout stage	Zonal finals	23 May 2018	1 August 2018 (A), 18 September 2018 (W)	8 August 2018 (A), 2 October 2018 (W)
Knockout stage	Inter-zone play-off semi-finals	23 May 2018	21–22 August 2018	28–29 August 2018
Knockout stage	Inter-zone play-off final	23 May 2018	19 September 2018	3 October 2018
Knockout stage	Final	23 May 2018	27 October 2018 at Basra International Stadium, Basra	

== Qualifying play-offs ==
In the qualifying play-offs, each tie was played on a home-and-away two-legged basis. The away goals rule, extra time (away goals do not apply in extra time) and penalty shoot-out were used to decide the winner if necessary (Regulations Article 9.3). The five winners of the play-off round advanced to the group stage to join the 31 direct entrants. The bracket of the qualifying play-offs for each zone was determined by the AFC based on the association ranking of each team, with the team from the higher-ranked association hosting the second leg.

=== Preliminary round ===
Central Asia Zone
Team 1	Agg.	Team 2	1st leg	2nd leg
Dordoi (Kyrgyzstan)	3–5	(Turkmenistan) Ahal	1–3	2–2

South Asia Zone
Team 1	Agg.	Team 2	1st leg	2nd leg
Transport United (Bhutan)	0–3	(India) Bengaluru	0–0	0–3
Saif (Bangladesh)	1–4	(Maldives) TC Sports	0–1	1–3

=== Play-off round ===
West Asia Zone
Team 1	Agg.	Team 2	1st leg	2nd leg
Hilal Al-Quds (Palestine)	1–2	(Oman) Al-Suwaiq	0–1	1–1

Central Asia Zone
Team 1	Agg.	Team 2	1st leg	2nd leg
Ahal (Turkmenistan)	3–0	(Tajikistan) Khujand	1–0	2–0

South Asia Zone
Team 1	Agg.	Team 2	1st leg	2nd leg
TC Sports (Maldives)	2–8	(India) Bengaluru	2–3	0–5

ASEAN Zone
Team 1	Agg.	Team 2	1st leg	2nd leg
Boeung Ket Angkor (Cambodia)	4–3	(Laos) Lao Toyota	3–3	1–0

East Asia Zone
Team 1	Agg.	Team 2	1st leg	2nd leg
Erchim (Mongolia)	0–7	(North Korea) Hwaebul	0–4	0–3

== Group stage ==
The draw for the group stage was held on 6 December 2017, 14:00 MYT (UTC+8), at the AFC House in Kuala Lumpur, Malaysia. The 36 teams were drawn into nine groups of four: three groups each in the West Asia Zone (Groups A–C) and the ASEAN Zone (Groups F–H), and one group each in the Central Asia Zone (Group D), the South Asia Zone (Group E), and the East Asia Zone (Group I). Teams from the same association in the West Asia Zone and ASEAN Zone could not be drawn into the same group. In the group stage, each group was played on a home-and-away round-robin basis. The following teams advanced to the knockout stage:

- The winners of each group and the best runners-up in the West Asia Zone and the ASEAN Zone advanced to the Zonal semi-finals.
- The winners of each group in the Central Asia Zone, the South Asia Zone, and the East Asia Zone advanced to the Inter-zone play-off semi-finals.

Tiebreakers

The teams were ranked according to points (3 points for a win, 1 point for a draw, 0 points for a loss). If tied on points, tiebreakers were applied in the following order (Regulations Article 10.5):

1. Points in head-to-head matches among tied teams;
2. Goal difference in head-to-head matches among tied teams;
3. Goals scored in head-to-head matches among tied teams;
4. Away goals scored in head-to-head matches among tied teams;
5. If more than two teams are tied, and after applying all head-to-head criteria above, a subset of teams are still tied, all head-to-head criteria above are reapplied exclusively to this subset of teams;
6. Goal difference in all group matches;
7. Goals scored in all group matches;
8. Penalty shoot-out if only two teams are tied and they met in the last round of the group;
9. Disciplinary points (yellow card = 1 point, red card as a result of two yellow cards = 3 points, direct red card = 3 points, yellow card followed by direct red card = 4 points);
10. Team from the higher-ranked association.

=== Group A ===
Pos	Team	Pld	W	D	L	GF	GA	GD	Pts	Qualification	JAZ	QUW	MAL	SUW
1	(Jordan) Al-Jazeera	6	4	2	0	13	6	+7	14	Zonal semi-finals	—	1–1	1–0	4–0
2	(Iraq) Al-Quwa Al-Jawiya	6	3	3	0	11	7	+4	12	Zonal semi-finals	2–2	—	1–1	2–0
3	(Bahrain) Malkiya	6	2	1	3	11	10	+1	7		1–2	3–4	—	4–1
4	(Oman) Al-Suwaiq	6	0	0	6	4	16	−12	0		2–3	0–1	1–2	—

Source: AFC

=== Group B ===
Pos	Team	Pld	W	D	L	GF	GA	GD	Pts	Qualification	AHE	ZAW	JAI	MAN
1	(Lebanon) Al-Ahed	6	3	3	0	11	5	+6	12	Zonal semi-finals	—	1–1	1–1	3–1
2	(Iraq) Al-Zawraa	6	2	4	0	8	5	+3	10		1–1	—	0–0	2–1
3	(Syria) Al-Jaish	6	1	4	1	4	6	−2	7		1–4	1–1	—	1–0
4	(Bahrain) Manama	6	0	1	5	3	10	−7	1		0–1	1–3	0–0	—

Source: AFC

=== Group C ===
Pos	Team	Pld	W	D	L	GF	GA	GD	Pts	Qualification	FAI	DHO	ANS	WAH
1	(Jordan) Al-Faisaly	6	4	1	1	10	5	+5	13	Zonal semi-finals	—	2–0	1–0	2–2
2	(Oman) Dhofar	6	2	2	2	4	5	−1	8		1–0	—	0–2	2–0
3	(Lebanon) Al-Ansar	6	2	1	3	6	7	−1	7		1–3	1–1	—	1–0
4	(Syria) Al-Wahda	6	1	2	3	5	8	−3	5		1–2	0–0	2–1	—

Source: AFC

=== Group D ===
Pos	Team	Pld	W	D	L	GF	GA	GD	Pts	Qualification	ALT	IST	AHA	ALA
1	(Turkmenistan) Altyn Asyr	6	4	2	0	17	7	+10	14	Inter-zone play-off semi-finals	—	2–2	1–0	5–0
2	(Tajikistan) Istiklol	6	4	1	1	10	7	+3	13		2–3	—	1–0	1–0
3	(Turkmenistan) Ahal	6	2	1	3	8	5	+3	7		0–0	0–1	—	5–0
4	(Kyrgyzstan) Alay Osh	6	0	0	6	7	23	−16	0		3–6	2–3	2–3	—

Source: AFC

=== Group E ===
Pos	Team	Pld	W	D	L	GF	GA	GD	Pts	Qualification	BFC	RAD	ABD	AIZ
1	(India) Bengaluru	6	5	0	1	14	3	+11	15	Inter-zone play-off semi-finals	—	1–0	1–0	5–0
2	(Maldives) New Radiant	6	4	0	2	12	5	+7	12		2–0	—	5–1	3–1
3	(Bangladesh) Abahani Limited Dhaka	6	1	1	4	5	12	−7	4		0–4	0–1	—	1–1
4	(India) Aizawl	6	1	1	4	5	16	−11	4 (Note: Head-to-head results: Aizawl 0–3 Abahani Limited Dhaka, Abahani Limited Dhaka 1–1 Aizawl.)		1–3	2–1	0–3	—

Source: AFC

=== Group F ===
Pos	Team	Pld	W	D	L	GF	GA	GD	Pts	Qualification	HOM	CER	BKA	SHA
1	(Singapore) Home United	6	4	1	1	15	6	+9	13 (Note: Head-to-head results: Home United 1–1 Ceres–Negros, Ceres–Negros 0–2 Home United.)	Zonal semi-finals	—	1–1	6–0	3–2
2	(Philippines) Ceres–Negros	6	4	1	1	17	3	+14	13	Zonal semi-finals	0–2	—	9–0	2–0
3	(Cambodia) Boeung Ket Angkor	6	2	0	4	8	24	−16	6		3–2	0–4	—	1–2
4	(Myanmar) Shan United	6	1	0	5	5	12	−7	3		0–1	0–1	1–4	—

Source: AFC

=== Group G ===
Pos	Team	Pld	W	D	L	GF	GA	GD	Pts	Qualification	YAN	GLO	THA	BAL
1	(Myanmar) Yangon United	6	4	1	1	15	9	+6	13	Zonal semi-finals	—	3–0	2–1	3–2
2	(Philippines) Global Cebu	6	2	2	2	9	10	−1	8		2–1	—	3–3	1–1
3	(Vietnam) FLC Thanh Hóa	6	1	3	2	9	11	−2	6		3–3	1–0	—	0–0
4	(Indonesia) Bali United	6	1	2	3	8	11	−3	5		1–3	1–3	3–1	—

Source: AFC

=== Group H ===
Pos	Team	Pld	W	D	L	GF	GA	GD	Pts	Qualification	PSJ	SLN	JDT	TAM
1	(Indonesia) Persija Jakarta	6	4	1	1	13	6	+7	13	Zonal semi-finals	—	1–0	4–0	4–1
2	(Vietnam) Sông Lam Nghệ An	6	3	1	2	8	5	+3	10 (Note: Head-to-head results: Sông Lam Nghệ An 2–0 Johor Darul Ta'zim, Johor Darul Ta'zim 3–2 Sông Lam Nghệ An.)		0–0	—	2–0	2–1
3	(Malaysia) Johor Darul Ta'zim	6	3	1	2	8	9	−1	10		3–0	3–2	—	2–1
4	(Singapore) Tampines Rovers	6	0	1	5	5	14	−9	1		2–4	0–2	0–0	—

Source: AFC

=== Group I ===
Pos	Team	Pld	W	D	L	GF	GA	GD	Pts	Qualification	APR	BEN	HWA	HAN
1	(North Korea) April 25	6	6	0	0	23	2	+21	18	Inter-zone play-off semi-finals	—	8–0	1–0	5–1
2	Benfica de Macau	6	4	0	2	13	15	−2	12		0–2	—	3–0	3–2
3	(North Korea) Hwaebul	6	2	0	4	9	10	−1	6		0–2	2–3	—	6–1
4	(Chinese Taipei) Hang Yuen	6	0	0	6	6	24	−18	0		1–5	1–4	0–1	—

Source: AFC

=== Ranking of second-placed teams ===
==== West Asia Zone ====
Pos	Grp	Team	Pld	W	D	L	GF	GA	GD	Pts	Qualification
1	A	(Iraq) Al-Quwa Al-Jawiya	6	3	3	0	11	7	+4	12	Zonal semi-finals
2	B	(Iraq) Al-Zawraa	6	2	4	0	8	5	+3	10	
3	C	(Oman) Dhofar	6	2	2	2	4	5	−1	8	

Source: AFC

==== ASEAN Zone ====
Pos	Grp	Team	Pld	W	D	L	GF	GA	GD	Pts	Qualification
1	F	(Philippines) Ceres–Negros	6	4	1	1	17	3	+14	13	Zonal semi-finals
2	H	(Vietnam) Sông Lam Nghệ An	6	3	1	2	8	5	+3	10	
3	G	(Philippines) Global Cebu	6	2	2	2	9	10	−1	8	

Source: AFC

== Knockout stage ==
In the knockout stage, the 11 teams played a single-elimination tournament. Each tie was played on a home-and-away two-legged basis, except the final which was played as a single match. The away goals rule (for two-legged ties), extra time (away goals do not apply in extra time) and penalty shoot-out were used to decide the winner if necessary (Regulations Article 11.3).

=== Bracket ===
The bracket was decided after the draw for the Zonal finals and the Inter-zone play-off semi-finals, which was held on 23 May 2018, 15:00 MYT (UTC+8), at the AFC House in Kuala Lumpur, Malaysia.

Zonal semi-finals
(Jordan) Al-Jazeera	1	1	2
(Jordan) Al-Faisaly	1	0	1
(Iraq) Al-Quwa Al-Jawiya	3	2	5
(Lebanon) Al-Ahed	1	2	3
(Philippines) Ceres–Negros	4	2	6
(Myanmar) Yangon United	2	3	5
(Singapore) Home United	3	3	6
(Indonesia) Persija Jakarta	2	1	3

Zonal finals
(Jordan) Al-Jazeera	0	1	1
(Iraq) Al-Quwa Al-Jawiya	1	3	4
(Philippines) Ceres–Negros	1	0	1
(Singapore) Home United	1	2	3

Inter-zone play-off semi-finals
(Singapore) Home United	0	1	1
(North Korea) April 25	2	9	11
(India) Bengaluru	2	0	2
(Turkmenistan) Altyn Asyr	3	2	5

Inter-zone play-off final
(North Korea) April 25	2	1	3
(Turkmenistan) Altyn Asyr (a)	2	1	3

Final
(Iraq) Al-Quwa Al-Jawiya	2
(Turkmenistan) Altyn Asyr	0

=== Zonal semi-finals ===
In the Zonal semi-finals, the four qualified teams from the West Asia Zone (Groups A–C) played in two ties, and the four qualified teams from the ASEAN Zone (Groups F–H) played in two ties, with the matchups and order of legs determined by the group stage draw and the identity of the best runners-up.

West Asia Zone
Team 1	Agg.	Team 2	1st leg	2nd leg
Al-Jazeera (Jordan)	2–1	(Jordan) Al-Faisaly	1–1	1–0
Al-Quwa Al-Jawiya (Iraq)	5–3	(Lebanon) Al-Ahed	3–1	2–2

ASEAN Zone
Team 1	Agg.	Team 2	1st leg	2nd leg
Home United (Singapore)	6–3	(Indonesia) Persija Jakarta	3–2	3–1
Ceres–Negros (Philippines)	6–5	(Myanmar) Yangon United	4–2	2–3

=== Zonal finals ===
The draw for the Zonal finals was held on 23 May 2018. In the Zonal finals, the two winners of West Asia Zonal semi-finals played each other, and the two winners of ASEAN Zonal semi-finals played each other, with the order of legs decided by draw. The winners of the West Asia Zonal final advanced to the final, while the winners of the ASEAN Zonal final advanced to the Inter-zone play-off semi-finals.

West Asia Zone
Team 1	Agg.	Team 2	1st leg	2nd leg
Al-Jazeera (Jordan)	1–4	(Iraq) Al-Quwa Al-Jawiya	0–1	1–3

ASEAN Zone
Team 1	Agg.	Team 2	1st leg	2nd leg
Ceres–Negros (Philippines)	1–3	(Singapore) Home United	1–1	0–2

=== Inter-zone play-off semi-finals ===
The draw for the Inter-zone play-off semi-finals was held on 23 May 2018. In the Inter-zone play-off semi-finals, the four zonal winners other than the West Asia Zone played in two ties, i.e., the winners of the Central Asia Zone (Group D), the winners of the South Asia Zone (Group E), the winners of the East Asia Zone (Group I), and the winners of the ASEAN Zonal final (whose identity was not known at the time of the draw), with the matchups and order of legs decided by draw, without any seeding.

Team 1	Agg.	Team 2	1st leg	2nd leg
Home United (Singapore)	1–11	(North Korea) April 25	0–2	1–9
Bengaluru (India)	2–5	(Turkmenistan) Altyn Asyr	2–3	0–2

=== Inter-zone play-off final ===
In the Inter-zone play-off final, the two winners of the Inter-zone play-off semi-finals played each other, with the order of legs determined by the Inter-zone play-off semi-final draw. The winners of the Inter-zone play-off final advanced to the final.

Team 1	Agg.	Team 2	1st leg	2nd leg
April 25 (North Korea)	3–3 (a)	(Turkmenistan) Altyn Asyr	2–2	1–1

=== Final ===
In the final, the winners of the West Asia Zonal final and the winners of the Inter-zone play-off final played each other, with the host team (winners of the West Asia Zonal final) alternated from the previous season's final.

27 October 2018
19:00 UTC+3

Al-Quwa Al-Jawiya (Iraq)	2–0	(Turkmenistan) Altyn Asyr
Ahmad 22'; Bayesh 57'	Live Report; Stats Report

Basra Sports City, Basra
Attendance: 24,665
Referee: Abdulrahman Al-Jassim (Qatar)

== Awards ==
Award	Player	Team
Most Valuable Player	(Iraq) Hammadi Ahmad	(Iraq) Al-Quwa Al-Jawiya
Top Goalscorer	(North Korea) An Il-bom	(North Korea) April 25

== Top scorers ==
Team eliminated / inactive for this round.

Rank	Player	Team	MD1	MD2	MD3	MD4	MD5	MD6	ZSF1	ZSF2	ZF1	ZF2	ISF1	ISF2	IF1	IF2	F	Total
1	(North Korea) An Il-bom	(North Korea) April 25	1	2	2	2	1						1	2	1			12
2	(Spain) Bienvenido Marañón	(Philippines) Ceres–Negros	2		1	1	3		2	1								10
2	(Guinea) Sekou Sylla	(Myanmar) Yangon United	2		2		1	2	2	1								10
4	(Croatia) Marko Šimić	(Indonesia) Persija Jakarta		3			4	1		1								9
4	(South Korea) Song Ui-young	(Singapore) Home United	1		1	1	1	1	1	1		1		1				9
6	(Turkmenistan) Altymyrat Annadurdyýew	(Turkmenistan) Altyn Asyr	3	1			2						1	1				8
6	(Iraq) Hammadi Ahmad	(Iraq) Al-Quwa Al-Jawiya	1		1				1	1	1	2					1	8
8	(Lebanon) Ahmad Zreik	(Lebanon) Al-Ahed		1	1	2	1	1		1								7
8	(Macau) Carlos Leonel	Benfica de Macau	2	2				3										7
10	(Maldives) Ali Ashfaq	(Maldives) New Radiant		3		1	2											6
10	(Iraq) Amjad Radhi	(Iraq) Al-Quwa Al-Jawiya			2	1		2	1									6
10	(North Korea) Kim Yu-song	(North Korea) April 25			4		1								1			6
10	(Jordan) Musa Al-Taamari	(Jordan) Al-Jazeera	1	1	1			1	1	1								6

Note: Goals scored in the qualifying play-offs are not counted when determining top scorer (Regulations Article 64.4).

Source: AFC

== See also ==
- 2018 AFC Champions League
