= Anatoly Vlasichev =

Kyrgyzstani footballer

Personal information
- Full name: Anatoly Vladimirovich Vlasichev
- Date of birth: June 14, 1988 (age 38)
- Place of birth: Osh, Kyrgyz SSR, Soviet Union
- Height: 1.84 m (6 ft 1/2 in)
- Position: Forward

Senior career*
Years	Team	Apps	(Gls)
2004–2007	Alay Osh		
2008	Neftchi Kochkor-Ata		
2010–2011	Dordoi Bishkek		
2012	Lashyn	21	(4)
2013	Spartak Semey	25	(1)
2014–2015	Okzhetpes	16	(0)
2015	Alay Osh		
2016	Dordoi Bishkek		
2016	Oman	24	(11)
2017	Dordoi Bishkek	21	(17)
2017	Makhtaaral	11	(2)
2018–2019	T.C. Sports Club	23	(12)
2019–2020	FC Alga Bishkek	15	(1)

International career^{‡}
2011–2014	Kyrgyzstan	13	(0)
- * Club domestic league appearances and goals as of 18 May 2026 ‡ National team caps and goals as of 18 May 2026

Anatoly Vladimirovich Vlasichev (Russian: Анатолий Владимирович Власичев; born 14 June 1988) is a Kyrgyz former footballer who played as a forward.

== Career ==
=== Club ===
In September 2016, Vlasichev signed for Oman Club in Oman, returning to Dordoi Bishkek on 19 January 2017.

In July 2017, Vlasichev moved from Dordoi Bishkek to FC Makhtaaral.

On 23 January 2018, Vlasichev scored the only goal in T.C. Sports Club's 1–0 victory over Saif Sporting Club in the first leg of their South Asia Zone 2018 AFC Cup Preliminary round match.

=== International ===
He is a member of the Kyrgyzstan national football team from 2011.

== Career statistics ==
=== International ===
Kyrgyzstan national team
Year	Apps	Goals
2011	5	2
2012	1	0
2013	3	2
2014	4	0
2015	7	1
2016	2	1
2017	3	0
2018	1	1
Total	26	7

Statistics accurate as of match played 5 September 2014
