= Ilyaz Alimov =

Kyrgyzstani footballer

Personal information
- Full name: Ilyaz Alimov
- Date of birth: 20 August 1990 (age 36)
- Place of birth: Soviet Union
- Height: 1.70 m (5 ft 7 in)
- Positions: Defender; striker

Senior career*
Years	Team	Apps	(Gls)
2006–????	Neftchi Kochkor-Ata		
2014–2019	Alay Osh		

International career^{‡}
2014–2019	Kyrgyzstan	7	(0)
- * Club domestic league appearances and goals as of 2 August 2019 ‡ National team caps and goals as of 2 August 2019

Ilyaz Alimov (born 20 August 1990), was a Kyrgyzstani footballer who was banned for life from playing football in August 2019.

== Career ==
=== Club ===
On 2 August 2019, the Asian Football Confederation announced that Alimov had been banned for life for his involvement in a conspiracy to manipulate matches during Alay Osh's 2017 AFC Cup and 2018 AFC Cup campaign.

=== International ===
Alimov made his international debut against China, in a 4–0 loss. It took him almost two years to receive his second cap, with it coming on 6 June in a 6–0 loss to the hands of Iran at the Enghelab Stadium, coming on as a substitute. He played in his first international victory in a 2–0 win over Kazakhstan, less than a week after his 26th birthday. He has gone on to play in a further two more national games, but is yet to score a goal.
