= 2017 Hwaebul Cup =

Tournament details
- Country: North Korea
- Dates: 27 July – 28 August
- Teams: 12

Final positions
- Champions: Sobaeksu (1st title)
- Runners-up: Ryŏmyŏng
- Semifinalists: Hwaebul; Kigwancha

The 2017 Hwaebul Cup was the fifth edition of the Hwaebul Cup (홰불, Torch) football competition, celebrating North Korea's Youth Day. The competition was held between 27 July and 28 August 2017, with all matches played at the Rungrado 1st of May Stadium in P'yŏngyang. The competition was arranged in two phases, a group stage followed by a single-elimination play-off semi-finals, and a single-game final. Sobaeksu Sports Club won the competition for the first time, as the defending champion, April 25, were not entered into the competition due to their taking part in the 2017 AFC Cup. Ryŏmyŏng finished second, whilst Hwaebul and Kigwancha placed third and fourth respectively.

== Round and dates ==
Round	Match date	Number of fixtures	Teams	New entries this round
Group stage	27 July – 20 August 2016	30	12 → 4	12
Semi-finals	23 August 2016	2	4 → 2	none
Final	28 August 2016	1	2 → 1	none

== Group stage ==
Twelve teams took part in the group stage: Hwaebul, Jebi, Kalmaegi, Kyŏnggong'ŏp, Ryŏmyŏng, and Sŏnbong in Group A, along with Kigwancha, P'yŏngyang City, Sobaeksu and three other clubs in Group B. Ryŏmyŏng won Group A with three wins and two losses and fourteen goals scored, whilst Hwaebul finished second in the group; Sobaeksu won Group B, whilst Kigwancha finished second. Kyŏnggong'ŏp finished third in Group A.

=== Known results ===
27 July 2017	Ryŏmyŏng	3–1	Jebi	Rungrado 1st of May Stadium, P'yŏngyang
		Report

27 July 2017	Hwaebul	3–0	Kalmaegi	Rungrado 1st of May Stadium, P'yŏngyang
		Report

1 August 2017	Ryŏmyŏng	4–2	Kalmaegi	Rungrado 1st of May Stadium, P'yŏngyang
	? 17'; ? 20'; ? 54'; ? 89'	Report	? 59'; ? 63'

8 August 2017	Hwaebul	2–1	Jebi	Rungrado 1st of May Stadium, P'yŏngyang
	? 27'; ? 84'	Report	? 51'

Ryŏmyŏng	5–0	Sŏnbong	Rungrado 1st of May Stadium, P'yŏngyang
	Report

Hwaebul	2–0	Sŏnbong	Rungrado 1st of May Stadium, P'yŏngyang
	Report

Ryŏmyŏng	1–1	Kyŏnggong'ŏp	Rungrado 1st of May Stadium, P'yŏngyang
	Report

Ryŏmyŏng	0–0	Hwaebul	Rungrado 1st of May Stadium, P'yŏngyang
	Report

Sobaeksu	2–1	Kigwancha	Rungrado 1st of May Stadium, P'yŏngyang
	Report

Sobaeksu	3–0	P'yŏngyang City	Rungrado 1st of May Stadium, P'yŏngyang
	Report

== Knock-out stage ==
=== Semi-finals ===
The top two finishers in each group advanced to the semi-finals, with the first-placed team in Group A playing the second-placed team in Group B, and vice versa. As such, Ryŏmyŏng met with Kigwancha, and Sobaeksu played Hwaebul. Both matches were played on 23 August

23 August 2017

Ryŏmyŏng	3–2 (a.e.t.)	Kigwancha
#11 28', 93'; #7 43'	Report	#7 7'; #10 88'

Rungrado 1st of May Stadium, P'yŏngyang

23 August 2017

Sobaeksu	2–2 (a.e.t.)	Hwaebul
? 40'; ? 103'	Report	? 90'; ? 107'
Penalties
	8–7

Rungrado 1st of May Stadium, P'yŏngyang

=== Final ===
The final was played at Rungrado 1 May Stadium on 28 August between Ryŏmyŏng and Sobaeksu, the winners of Group A and Group B respectively. Ryŏmyŏng started the game with a 4–4–2 formation and an attacking mindset, looking to defend by keep Sobaeksu contained in their own end. The first half ended scoreless, so both teams attempted to intensify their game in the second half. Sobaeksu, taking advantage of their physical fitness and better technical ability, created several worthwhile chances at the start of the half. However, Ryŏmyŏng seized an opportunity to counter, and No. 10 opened the scoring with a long-range shot in the 56th minute. Six minutes from full time, Sobaeksu made a break up the left wing, and No. 9 pounced on No. 8's cross into the box to equalise and send the match into extra time. In the 8th minute of extra time, Ryomyong's No. 14 was sent off, but despite the numerical disadvantage, they continued to press their attack. However, in the 21st minute they turned the ball over on a misplayed pass, and scored the winning goal on a quick counter-attack, giving Sobaeksu the win and their first Hwaebul Cup title.

28 August 2017

Ryŏmyŏng	2–3 (a.e.t.)	Sobaeksu
? 37'; ? 56'	Report	? 62'; ? 84'; ? 111'

Rungrado 1st of May Stadium, P'yŏngyang

Ryŏmyŏng	Sobaeksu

2017 Hwaebul Cup
Sobaeksu
1st title
