= Israa Hamwiah =

Syrian footballer (born 1991)

Personal information
- Full name: Israa Amer Hamwiah
- Date of birth: 11 February 1991 (age 35)
- Place of birth: Homs, Syria
- Height: 1.88 m (6 ft 2 in)
- Position: Defensive midfielder

Team information
- Current team: Aali

Youth career
- Al-Karamah

Senior career*
Years	Team	Apps	(Gls)
2010–2016	Al-Karamah		
2013–2014	→ Al-Sheikh Hussein FC (loan)	9	(2)
2014	→ Al-Busaiteen (loan)		
2015	→ Salam Zgharta (loan)		
2016	→ Al-Busaiteen (loan)		
2016–2018	Al-Malkiya	1	(3)
2018–2019	Al-Qadsia		
2019	Al-Hidd		
2019–2020	Al-Malkia		
2020–2021	Al-Manama		
2021–2022	Al-Hala		
2022	Al-Ittihad		
2022–	Aali		

International career^{‡}
2010	Syria U-20		
2017–	Syria	5	(0)
- * Club domestic league appearances and goals ‡ National team caps and goals as of 11 November 2021

Israa Hamwiah (Arabic: إسراء حموية, born 11 February 1991 in Homs) is a Syrian footballer who plays for Aali.
