= Lalramhmunmawia =

Indian footballer

Personal information
- Date of birth: 16 March 1997 (age 29)
- Place of birth: Kolasib, Mizoram, India
- Height: 1.78 m (5 ft 10 in)
- Position: Left back

Youth career
- Aizawl

Senior career*
Years	Team	Apps	(Gls)
2017–2020	Aizawl	30	(0)
2020–2021	Sudeva Delhi	0	(0)
2021–2022	Mohammedan	0	(0)
- * Club domestic league appearances and goals as of 23:44, 14 September 2021 (UTC)

Lalramhmunmawia (born 16 March 1997) is an Indian professional footballer who plays as a defender for Mohammedan in the I-League.

== Career ==
He made his professional debut for the Aizawl against East Bengal F.C. at Salt Lake Stadium on 28 November 2017, he started and played full match as Aizawl drew 2–2.

== Career statistics ==
=== Club ===
As of 14 September 2021

Club	Season	League			Cup		AFC		Total	
Club	Season	Division	Apps	Goals	Apps	Goals	Apps	Goals	Apps	Goals
Aizawl	2017–18	I-League	14	0	2 (Note: Appearance(s) in Super Cup)	0	6 (Note: Appearance(s) in AFC Champions League) (Note: Appearance(s) in AFC Cup)	1	22	1
Aizawl	2018–19	I-League	8	0	0	0	—		8	0
Aizawl	2019–20	I-League	8	0	0	0	—		8	0
Aizawl	Aizawl total		30	0	2	0	6	1	38	1
Sudeva Delhi	2020–21	I-League	0	0	0	0	—		0	0
Mohammedan	2021–22	I-League	0	0	1 (Note: Appearance(s) in Durand Cup)	0	—		1	0
Mohammedan	2022–23	I-League	0	0	0	0	—		0	0
Career total			30	0	3	0	6	1	39	1
