= Myrat Annaýew =

Turkmen footballer

Personal information
- Full name: Myrat Gurbannepesowiç Annaýew
- Date of birth: 6 May 1993 (age 33)
- Place of birth: Aşgabat, Turkmenistan
- Height: 1.77 m (5 ft 10 in)
- Position: Forward

Team information
- Current team: FC Altyn Asyr

Senior career*
Years	Team	Apps	(Gls)
2015–2017	Altyn Asyr		
2017–2018	Ahal		
2019–	FC Altyn Asyr		

International career
2017–	Turkmenistan	8	(1)
- * Club domestic league appearances and goals

Myrat Annaýew (born 6 May 1993) is a Turkmen professional footballer who plays for FC Altyn Asyr and Turkmenistan as forward.

== International career ==
Annaýew made his senior debut for Turkmenistan against Qatar. He was included in Turkmenistan's squad for the 2019 AFC Asian Cup in the United Arab Emirates.

He played for Turkmenistan national futsal team at 2020 AFC Futsal Championship qualification.

== International goals ==
No.	Date	Venue	Opponent	Score	Result	Competition
1.	11 June 2023	Pakhtakor Central Stadium, Tashkent, Uzbekistan	Tajikistan	1–0	1–1	2023 CAFA Nations Cup
