= Mohammad Tannous =

Jordanian footballer

Personal information
- Full name: Mohammad Tannous Alekrmawi
- Date of birth: March 12, 1992 (age 34)
- Place of birth: Jordan
- Height: 1.78 m (5 ft 10 in)
- Position: Midfielder

Team information
- Current team: Al-Jazeera
- Number: 13

Youth career
- Al-Jazeera

Senior career*
Years	Team	Apps	(Gls)
2011–	Al-Jazeera		
- * Club domestic league appearances and goals ‡ National team caps and goals as of 6 March 2017

Mohammad Tannous (Arabic: محمد طنوس العكرماوي; born March 12, 1992) is a Jordanian football player who plays as a midfielder for Al-Jazeera.
