= Furkat Tursunow =

Turkmen footballer (born 1991)

Personal information
- Date of birth: 5 February 1991 (age 35)
- Place of birth: Turkmen SSR, Soviet Union
- Position: Striker

Team information
- Current team: Altyn Asyr
- Number: 18

Senior career*
Years	Team	Apps	(Gls)
2012	Lebap	?	(?)
2013–2017	HTTU	?	(?)
2018–	Altyn Asyr	15	(4)

International career^{‡}
2013	Turkmenistan U21	6	(0)
2012	Turkmenistan	3	(0)
- * Club domestic league appearances and goals as of 2018-5-17 ‡ National team caps and goals as of 9 June 2021

Furkat Tursunov (Turkmen: Furkat Tursunow; born 5 February 1991) is a Turkmen footballer who plays for Turkmen club Altyn Asyr. He was part of the Turkmenistan national team from 2012.

== Club career ==
He began his professional career in 2011 in FC Lebap. From 2013 play for FC HTTU.

== International career ==
Tursunow made his senior national team debut on 24 October 2012, in a 2012 VFF Cup match against Vietnam.

He played for Turkmenistan youth team in 5 matches at Commonwealth of Independent States Cup 2013., scored 1 goal to Estonia.
