= Ibrahim Bayesh =

Iraqi footballer (born 2000)

- Bayesh with Iraq in 2026

Personal information
- Full name: Ibrahim Bayesh Kamil Al-Kaabawi
- Date of birth: 1 May 2000 (age 26)
- Place of birth: Baghdad, Iraq
- Height: 1.77 m (5 ft 10 in)
- Position: Midfielder

Team information
- Current team: Erbil

Youth career
- Al-Iskan
- Al-Quwa Al-Jawiya
- Al-Shorta

Senior career*
Years	Team	Apps	(Gls)
2014–2016	Al-Sinaa		(1)
2016–2017	Zakho		(2)
2017	Naft Al-Wasat		(1)
2017–2018	Al-Zawraa		(2)
2018–2024	Al-Quwa Al-Jawiya		(14)
2024–2026	Al-Riyadh	44	(6)
2026	Al-Dhafra	9	(0)
2026–	Erbil	0	(0)

International career^{‡}
2015–2016	Iraq U16	2	(0)
2017	Iraq U19	2	(1)
2017–2018	Iraq U23	4	(0)
2024	Iraq Olympic (O.P.)	3	(0)
2017–	Iraq	79	(8)
- * Club domestic league appearances and goals as of 16 May 2026 ‡ National team caps and goals as of 26 June 2026

Ibrahim Bayesh Kamil Al-Kaabawi (Arabic: إبرَاهِيْم بَايَش كَامِل الْكَعْبَاوِيّ; born 1 May 2000) is an Iraqi professional footballer who plays for Erbil as a midfielder and the Iraq national team.

== Club career ==
=== Early career ===
Bayesh joined Naft Al Wasat from Zakho in February 2017, to play the second half of the 16–17 season.

=== Al Zawra'a ===
Following his stint with Naft Al Wasat, Bayesh was close to joining Tunisian side Étoile Sportive du Sahel, however, talks broke down at the contract stage, and he signed for Baghdad side Al-Zawra'a. Bayesh only spent one season with Al-Zawra'a, where the team won the 17-18 league title. Bayesh's contract was terminated in June, due to disputes with the club, where the player missed two weeks on training unauthorized.

=== Al Quwa Al Jawiya ===
The following season, Bayesh joined Al-Zawra'a rivals Al Quwa Al Jawiya, In October 2018, Bayesh scored the second goal in the final of 2018 AFC Cup, which his team won.

== International career ==
Bayesh was called up to the 23rd Arabian Gulf Cup, in which Iraq were knocked out in the Semi Final, but the player was on the bench throughout the entire tournament.

Bayesh was called up to the 24th Arabian Gulf Cup, in which Iraq lost in the Semi Final against Bahrain on penalties, with Bayesh scoring in the shootout.

== Career statistics ==
=== International ===
As of match played 30 November 2025

Appearances and goals by national team and year
National team	Year	Apps	Goals
Iraq	2017	1	0
Iraq	2018	1	0
Iraq	2019	12	3
Iraq	2020	2	0
Iraq	2021	10	0
Iraq	2022	8	0
Iraq	2023	13	3
Iraq	2024	15	1
Iraq	2025	7	1
Iraq	2026	21	2
Total		94	10

Scores and results list Iraq's goal tally first.

No	Date	Venue	Opponent	Score	Result	Competition
1.	11 August 2019	Karbala International Stadium, Karbala, Iraq	Yemen	1–0	2–1	2019 WAFF Championship
2.	15 October 2019	Olympic Stadium, Phnom Penh, Cambodia	Cambodia	1–0	4–0	2022 FIFA World Cup qualification
3.	5 December 2019	Abdullah bin Khalifa Stadium, Doha	Bahrain	2–1	2–2 (a.e.t.) (3–5 p)	24th Arabian Gulf Cup
4.	9 January 2023	Basra International Stadium, Basra, Iraq	Saudi Arabia	1–0	2–0	25th Arabian Gulf Cup
5.	16 January 2023	Basra International Stadium, Basra, Iraq	Qatar	1–0	2–1	25th Arabian Gulf Cup
6.	19 January 2023	Basra International Stadium, Basra, Iraq	Oman	1–0	3–2 (a.e.t.)	25th Arabian Gulf Cup
7.	15 October 2024	Yongin Mireu Stadium, Yongin, South Korea	South Korea	2–3	2–3	2026 FIFA World Cup qualification
8.	20 March 2025	Basra International Stadium, Basra, Iraq	Kuwait	2–2	2–2	2026 FIFA World Cup qualification

== Honours ==
Al-Zawraa

- Iraqi Premier League: 2017–18
- Iraqi Super Cup: 2017

Al-Quwa Al-Jawiya

- Iraqi Premier League: 2020–21
- Iraq FA Cup: 2020–21, 2022–23
- AFC Cup: 2018

Iraq

- Arabian Gulf Cup: 2023

Individual

- Arabian Gulf Cup best player: 2023
- Arabian Gulf Cup joint top scorer: 2023
- Soccer Iraq Player of the Year: 2023
