= Hammadi Ahmed =

Iraqi footballer

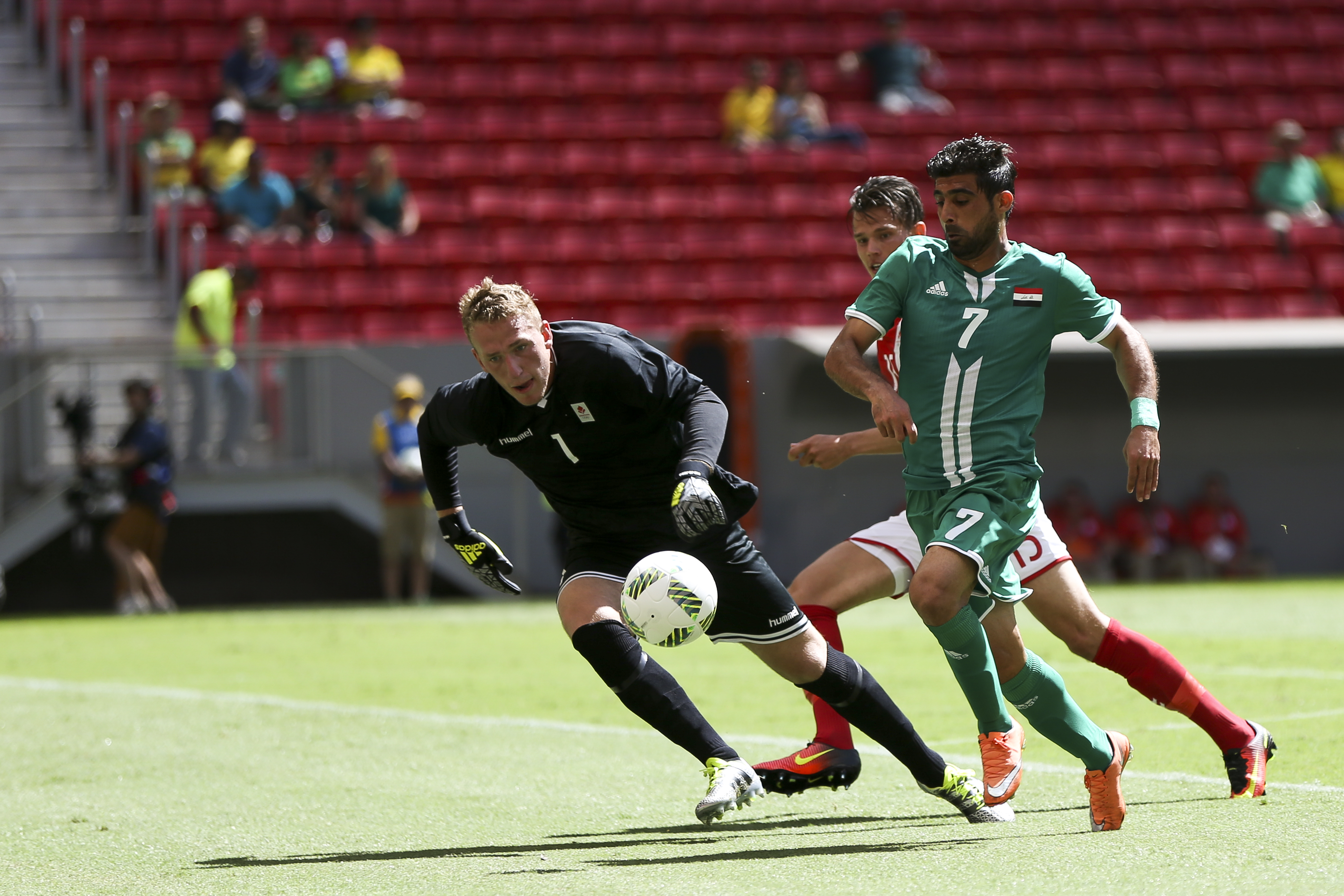
- Ahmed with Iraq at the 2016 Summer Olympics

Personal information
- Full name: Hammadi Ahmed Abdullah
- Date of birth: 18 October 1989 (age 37)
- Place of birth: Ishaqi, Iraq
- Height: 1.72 m (5 ft 7 1/2 in)
- Position: Striker

Youth career
- Al-Ishaqi
- Balad
- 2004–2005: Salahaddin

Senior career*
Years	Team	Apps	(Gls)
2005–2010	Samarra		(19)
2010–2023	Al-Quwa Al-Jawiya		(143)
Total		–	(162)

International career
2016	Iraq Olympic (O.P.)	3	(0)
2012–2017	Iraq	40	(6)

Managerial career
- 2023: Al-Quwa Al-Jawiya (caretaker)
Medal record
Representing Iraq
CISM World Football Trophy
Winner	2013 Azerbaijan
- * Club domestic league appearances and goals

Hammadi Ahmed Abdullah Al-Daiya (Arabic: حمادي احمد عبدالله الدعية; born 18 October 1989 in Samarra) is an Iraqi former professional footballer who played as a striker for Al-Quwa Al-Jawiya and the Iraq national team. He is currently a member of the administrative board at Al-Quwa Al-Jawiya and has served as caretaker manager for the club.

== Club career ==
Hammadi started his career with two local clubs in the lower divisions, first at hometown side Al-Ishaqi and then Balad. In 2004, he moved to first division club Salahaddin where he spent only a season before making his name at Samarra becoming the club’s main striker and is fondly remembered by their fans.

His move to Baghdad giants Al-Quwa Al-Jawiya came about after he was one of the provincial players called into the national team after the appointment of German Wolfgang Sidka in 2010 and roomed with Al-Jawiya’s Ahmed Ayad – who was the go-between with the player and the Al-Jawiya club officials and after he was given his release papers by Samarra, he signed for the famous club.

He helped Iraq to the World Military Cup in the 2013 CISM World Military Cup where Hamadi was the tournament’s top scorer with nine goals in Baku. Hamadi is a poacher in the six-yard box and has been one of the most prolific goal scorers in the Iraqi league scoring almost 100 goals in his six seasons with the Blue Falcons in the league including 27 goals in a single season in his second season at the club where he was league top scorer for the first time in his career.

On 1 December 2016 Hammadi received offers from clubs in Qatar, Baniyas club in United Arab Emirates and Al-Shabab FC in Saudi Arabia to play to their team.

== International career ==
Ahmed made his senior international debut for Iraq on 17 April 2012 against Egypt, and on 14 November 2012, he scored his first goal for the national team against Jordan.

== Career statistics ==
=== International goals ===
#	Date	Venue	Opponent	Score	Result	Competition
1.	14 November 2012	Grand Hamad Stadium, Doha	Jordan	1–0	1–0	2014 World Cup qualifier
2.	10 December 2012	Al-Sabah Stadium, Kuwait City	Jordan	1–0	1–0	2012 WAFF Championship
3.	9 January 2013	Khalifa Sports City Stadium, Isa Town	Kuwait	1–0	1–0	21st Arabian Gulf Cup
4.	12 January 2013	Khalifa Sports City Stadium, Isa Town	Yemen	2–0	2–0	21st Arabian Gulf Cup
5.	11 November 2013	Prince Mohammed Stadium, Zarqa	Syria	1–1	2–1	Friendly match
6.	19 November 2013	Gelora Bung Karno Stadium, Jakarta	Indonesia	1–0	2–0	2015 Asian Cup qual.

== Honours ==
Al-Quwa Al-Jawiya

- Iraqi Premier League: 2016–17, 2020–21
- Iraq FA Cup: 2015–16, 2020–21, 2022–23
- AFC Cup: 2016, 2017, 2018

Iraq

- Arab Nations Cup third place: 2012
- WAFF Championship runner-up: 2012
- Arabian Gulf Cup runner-up: 2013

Iraq Military

- CISM World Football Trophy: 2013

Individual

- Iraqi Premier League Top scorer: 2011–12 (27 goals), 2015–16 (12 goals)
- World Men's Military Cup Top scorer: 2013 (9 goals)
- AFC Cup Top scorer: 2016 (16 goals)
- AFC Cup Most Valuable Player: 2016, 2018
- Asian Footballer of the Year nominee: 2016
