= 2018–19 in Indian football =

Football in India
- Season: 2018–19

Men's football
- I-League: Chennai City
- ISL: Bengaluru
- I-League 2nd Div.: TRAU
- Super Cup: Goa

Women's football
- IWL: Sethu

The 2018–19 season is the 131st competitive association football season in India.

== National teams ==
=== India national football team ===
==== 2018 Intercontinental Cup ====
Pos	Team	Pld	W	D	L	GF	GA	GD	Pts	
1	India (H)	3	2	0	1	9	2	+7	6	Advance to the Final
2	Kenya	3	2	0	1	6	4	+2	6	Advance to the Final
3	New Zealand	3	2	0	1	4	3	+1	6	Third Place
4	Chinese Taipei	3	0	0	3	0	10	−10	0	Fourth Place

Source: Soccerway
Rules for classification: 1) points; 2) goal difference; 3) head-to-head match result
(H) Hosts

1 June 2018	India	5–0	Chinese Taipei	Mumbai, India
20:00 IST	Chhetri 14', 34', 62'; U. Singh 48'; Halder 78'	Report		Stadium: Mumbai Football Arena; Attendance: 2,569; Referee: Nivon Robesh Gamini (Sri Lanka)

4 June 2018	India	3–0	Kenya	Mumbai, India
20:00 IST	Chhetri 68' (pen.), 90+2'; Lalpekhlua 71'	Report		Stadium: Mumbai Football Arena; Attendance: 8,890; Referee: Hettikamkanamge Perera (Sri Lanka)

7 June 2018	India	1–2	New Zealand	Mumbai, India
20:00 IST	Chhetri 47'	Report	De Jong 49'; Dyer 86'	Stadium: Mumbai Football Arena; Referee: Hettikamkanamge Perera (Sri Lanka)

Final

10 June 2018 Final	India	2–0	Kenya	Mumbai, India
20:00 IST	Chhetri 8', 29'	Report		Stadium: Mumbai Football Arena; Referee: Nivon Robesh Gamini (Sri Lanka)

==== 2018 SAFF Championship ====
Group B

Pos	Team	Pld	W	D	L	GF	GA	GD	Pts	Qualification
1	India	2	2	0	0	4	0	+4	6	Qualified for semi-finals
2	Maldives	2	0	1	1	0	2	−2	1 (Note: Maldives and Sri Lanka were level on points, goal difference, goals against and head-to-head. The winner was decided by a coin toss.)	Qualified for semi-finals
3	Sri Lanka	2	0	1	1	0	2	−2	1	

Source: RSSSF
Notes:

5 September 2018	India	2–0	Sri Lanka	Dhaka, Bangladesh
19:00	Kuruniyan 35'; Chhangte 47'	Report		Stadium: Bangabandhu National Stadium; Referee: Hanna Hattab (Syria)

9 September 2018	India	2–0	Maldives	Dhaka, Bangladesh
19:00	Poojari 36'; M. Singh 44'	Report		Stadium: Bangabandhu National Stadium; Referee: Hanna Hattab (Syria)

Semi-final

12 September 2018	India	3–1	Pakistan	Dhaka, Bangladesh
19:00 IST	Manvir Singh 48', 69'; Sumeet Passi 84'	Report	Muhammed Ali 88'	Stadium: Bangabandhu National Stadium; Referee: Sivakorn Pu-udom (Thailand)

Final

15 September 2018	Maldives	2–1	India	Dhaka, Bangladesh
18:30 IST	Mahudhee 19'; Fasir 66'	Report	Passi 90+2'	Stadium: Bangabandhu National Stadium; Referee: Hasan Akrami (Iran)

==== 2019 AFC Asian Cup ====
Group A

Pos	Team	Pld	W	D	L	GF	GA	GD	Pts	Qualification
1	United Arab Emirates (H)	3	1	2	0	4	2	+2	5	Advance to knockout stage
2	Thailand	3	1	1	1	3	5	−2	4 (Note: Head-to-head points: Thailand 3, Bahrain 0.)	Advance to knockout stage
3	Bahrain	3	1	1	1	2	2	0	4	Advance to knockout stage
4	India	3	1	0	2	4	4	0	3	

Source: AFC
(H) Hosts
Notes:
6 January 2019
17:30

Thailand	1–4	India
Teerasil 33'	Report	Chhetri 27' (pen.), 46'; Thapa 68'; Lalpekhlua 80'

Al Nahyan Stadium, Abu Dhabi
Attendance: 3,250
Referee: Liu Kwok Man (Hong Kong)

10 January 2019
20:00

India	0–2	United Arab Emirates
	Report	Khalf. Mubarak 41'; Mabkhout 88'

Zayed Sports City Stadium, Abu Dhabi
Attendance: 43,206
Referee: César Ramos (Mexico)

14 January 2019
20:00

India	0–1	Bahrain
	Report	Rashid 90+1' (pen.)

Sharjah Stadium, Sharjah
Attendance: 11,417
Referee: Ilgiz Tantashev (Uzbekistan)

=== India national under-23 football team ===
==== 2020 AFC U-23 Championship qualification ====
Group F

Pos	Team	Pld	W	D	L	GF	GA	GD	Pts	Qualification
1	Uzbekistan (H)	2	1	1	0	3	0	+3	4	Final tournament
2	Tajikistan	2	1	1	0	2	0	+2	4	
3	India	2	0	0	2	0	5	−5	0	
4	Pakistan	0	0	0	0	0	0	0	0	Withdrew

Source: AFC
Rules for classification: Qualification tiebreakers
(H) Hosts

22 March 2019	India	0–3	Uzbekistan	Tashkent, Uzbekistan
17:00 UTC+5			Kobilov 45+1' (p); Abdikholikov 78', 83'	Stadium: Pakhtakor Central Stadium; Attendance: 2,452; Referee: Ahmed Al-Kaf (Oman)

24 March 2019	Tajikistan	2–0	India	Tashkent, Uzbekistan
17:00 UTC+5	Yodgorov 30'; Solehov 85'			Stadium: Pakhtakor Central Stadium; Attendance: 282; Referee: Ho Wai Sing (Hong Kong)

=== India men's national under-16 football team ===
==== 2018 AFC U-16 Championship ====
Group C

Pos	Team	Pld	W	D	L	GF	GA	GD	Pts	Qualification
1	Indonesia	3	1	2	0	3	1	+2	5	Knockout stage
2	India	3	1	2	0	1	0	+1	5	Knockout stage
3	Iran	3	1	1	1	5	2	+3	4	
4	Vietnam	3	0	1	2	1	7	−6	1	

Source: AFC
Rules for classification: Group stage tiebreakers

21 September 2018	Vietnam	0–1	India	UM Arena Stadium, Kuala Lumpur
20:45		Report	V. Singh 86' (pen.)	Attendance: 166; Referee: Yusuke Araki (Japan)

24 September 2018	India	0–0	Iran	Bukit Jalil National Stadium, Kuala Lumpur
16:30		Report		Attendance: 186; Referee: Nazmi Nasaruddin (Malaysia)

27 September 2018	India	0–0	Indonesia	Bukit Jalil National Stadium, Kuala Lumpur
20:45		Report		Attendance: 11,388; Referee: Ahmad Yacoub Ibrahim (Jordan)

Quarter-final

1 October 2018	South Korea	1–0	India	Petaling Jaya Stadium, Petaling Jaya
20:45	Jeong Sang-bin 68'	Report		Attendance: 200; Referee: Yusuke Araki (Japan)

=== India women's national football team ===
==== 2019 SAFF Women's Championship ====
Group B

Pos	Team	Pld	W	D	L	GF	GA	GD	Pts	Status
1	India	2	2	0	0	11	0	+11	6	Qualified for Knockout stage
2	Sri Lanka	2	1	0	1	2	5	−3	3	Qualified for Knockout stage
3	Maldives	2	0	0	2	0	8	−8	0	

Updated to match(es) played on 17 March 2019. Source: SAFF

13 March 2019	India	6–0	Maldives	Sahid Rangsala, Biratnagar
15:00	Sanju 27', 89'; Grace 8'; Sweety 13'; Indumathi 23'; Ratanbala 45+4'	SAFF AIFF		Attendance: 1,813; Referee: Ashmita Manandhar (Nepal)

17 March 2019	Sri Lanka	0–5	India	Sahid Rangsala, Biratnagar
15:00		SAFF AIFF	Grace 4'; Sandhiya 7'; Indumathi 36'; Sangita 45'; Ratanbala 47'	Attendance: 1,684; Referee: Mizanur Rahman (Bangladesh)

Semi-final

20 March 2019	India	4–0	Bangladesh	Sahid Rangsala, Biratnagar
15:00	Indumathi 22', 37'; Dalima 18'; Manisha 93+3'	AIFF		Attendance: 1,263; Referee: Mohommed Nizam (Sri Lanka)

Final

22 March 2019	Nepal	1–3	India	Sahid Rangsala, Biratnagar
15:00	Bhandari 33'	AIFF	Chhibber 26'; Grace 63'; Tamang 78'	Attendance: 10,000; Referee: Mohammed Manir Dhali (Bangladesh)

==== 2020 AFC Olympic Qualifying Tournatment ====
First round

Pos	Team	Pld	W	D	L	GF	GA	GD	Pts	Qualification
1	Myanmar (H)	3	2	1	0	8	2	+6	7	Second round
2	India	3	1	1	1	9	4	+5	4	Second round
3	Nepal	3	0	3	0	3	3	0	3	Second round
4	Bangladesh	3	0	1	2	2	13	−11	1	

Source: AFC
(H) Hosts

8 November 2018 2020 Olympics Q	India	1–1	Nepal	Yangon, Myanmar
14:00 IST	Kamala Devi 37'	FIFA AFC	Niru Thapa 11'	Stadium: Thuwunna Stadium; Attendance: 150; Referee: Lee Yi-Chi (Taiwan)

11 November 2018 2020 Olympics Q	Bangladesh	1–7	India	Yangon, Myanmar
14:00 IST	Krishna Rani 81'	FIFA AFC	Kamala Devi 16' (pen.), 53'; Bala Devi 22', 23', 62', 75'; Sanju 73'	Stadium: Thuwunna Stadium; Attendance: 100; Referee: Mi Siyu (China)

13 November 2018 2020 Olympics Q	Myanmar	2–1	India	Yangon, Myanmar
17:00 IST	Win Theingi Tun 3'; Nge Nge Htwe 83'	FIFA AFC	Ratanbala Devi	Stadium: Thuwunna Stadium; Attendance: 1698; Referee: Ri Hyang-ok (DPR Korea)

Second round

Though India won first two matches against Indonesia and Nepal and was able to draw against Myanmar but due to Myanmar's goal difference is greater than that of India's, India could not move to the third round of the qualification.

Pos	Team	Pld	W	D	L	GF	GA	GD	Pts	Qualification
1	Myanmar (H)	3	2	1	0	12	4	+8	7	Third round
2	India	3	2	1	0	8	4	+4	7	
3	Nepal	3	1	0	2	4	7	−3	3	
4	Indonesia	3	0	0	3	1	10	−9	0	

Source: AFC
Rules for classification: Qualification tiebreakers
(H) Hosts

3 April 2019 2020 Olympic 2R Q	India	2–0	Indonesia	Mandalay, Myanmar
14:00 IST	Dangmei Grace 27', 68'	AFC AIFF		Stadium: Mandalarthiri Stadium; Attendance: 100; Referee: Kim Yu-jeong (South Korea)

6 April 2019 2020 Olympic 2R Q	Nepal	1–3	India	Mandalay, Myanmar
14:00 IST	Niru Thapa 7'	AFC AIFF	P. Magar 6' (o.g.); Ranganathan 60'; Ashalata 78' (pen.)	Stadium: Mandalarthiri Stadium; Attendance: 356; Referee: Law Bik Chi (Hong Kong)

9 April 2019 2020 Olympic 2R Q	Myanmar	3–3	India	Mandalay, Myanmar
14:30 IST	Win Tun 17', 21', 72'	AFC AIFF	Sandhiya Ranganathan 10'; Sanju 32'; Ratanbala 64'	Stadium: Mandalarthiri Stadium; Attendance: 851; Referee: Mahsa Ghorbani (Iran)

=== India women's national under-18 football team ===
==== 2018 SAFF U-18 Women's Championship ====
Group A

- Times listed are UTC+6

Pos	Team	Pld	W	D	L	GF	GA	GD	Pts	Status
1	India	2	2	0	0	12	0	+12	6	Qualified for Knockout stage
2	Bhutan (H)	2	1	0	1	13	4	+9	3	Qualified for Knockout stage
3	Maldives	2	0	0	2	0	19	−19	0	

Source: Championship schedule according to the SAFF U18 Women's Championship official website.SAFF
(H) Hosts

28 September 2018	India	4–0	Bhutan	Changlimithang Stadium
16:00	Devneta Roy 35', 50'; Manisha 64'; Ashem Roja Devi 67'	SAFF AIFF

2 October 2018	Maldives	0–8	India	Changlimithang Stadium
16:00		SAFF AIFF	16' Ashem Roja Devi; 19' Karishma Rai; 22' (pen.) Pakpi Devi; 27' B. Mariyammal; 34', 46' Soni Behra; 57' Sangita Kumari; 62' (o.g.) Jannat Adam

Semi-final

5 October 2018	India	1–1 (1–3 p)	Nepal	Changlimithang Stadium
15:30	Jabamani Tudu 62'	SAFF AIFF	15' Rashmi Kumari Ghising
	Penalties
	Devnata Roy (penalty missed); Asha Kumari (penalty missed); Jabamani Tudu (penalty scored); Manisha (penalty missed)		(penalty scored) Rekha Poudel; (penalty missed) Puja Rana; (penalty scored) Anjana Rani Magar

=== India women's national under-15 football team ===
==== 2018 SAFF U-15 Women's Championship ====
Pos	Team	Pld	W	D	L	GF	GA	GD	Pts	Status
1	India	2	2	0	0	13	0	+13	6	Qualified for Semi-finals
2	Bhutan (H)	2	1	0	1	6	1	+5	3	Qualified for Semi-finals
3	Sri Lanka	2	0	0	2	0	18	−18	0	

(H) Hosts

9 August 2018	India	12–0	Sri Lanka	Changlimithang Stadium, Thimphu
16:00	Silky Devi 1', 20', 44'; Lynda Kom 6'; Avika Singh 14', 59'; Sunita Munda 42', 79'; Kritina Devi 47'; Kiran. 72'; Anju. 87', 89'	AIFF

13 August 2018	India	1–0	Bhutan	Changlimithang Stadium, Thimphu
16:00	Silky Devi 58'	AIFF

===== Semi-final =====
16 August 2018	India	2–1	Nepal	Changlimithang Stadium, Thimphu
16:00	Lynda Kom 31'; Kritina Devi 59'	AIFF	37' Rajani Thokar

===== Final =====
18 August 2018	India	1–0	Bangladesh	Changlimithang Stadium, Thimphu
19:00	Sunita Munda 66'	AIFF

== AFC club competitions ==
=== 2018 AFC Cup ===
==== Inter-zone play-off semi-finals ====
Team 1	Agg.	Team 2	1st leg	2nd leg
Bengaluru (India)	2–5	(Turkmenistan) Altyn Asyr	2–3	0–2

22 August 2018	Bengaluru (India)	2–3	(Turkmenistan) Altyn Asyr	Sree Kanteerava Stadium, Bangalore
20:00 UTC+5:30	Bheke 63'; Paartalu 88'	Live Report; Stats Report	Orazsähedow 11', 46'; Annadurdyýew 25'	Attendance: 5,832; Referee: Jumpei Iida (Japan)

29 August 2018	Altyn Asyr (Turkmenistan)	2–0	(India) Bengaluru	Köpetdag Stadium, Ashgabat
16:30 UTC+5	Annadurdyýew 50'; Orazsähedow 58'	Live Report; Stats Report		Attendance: 12,326; Referee: Turki Al-Khudhayr (Saudi Arabia)

Altyn Asyr won 5–2 on aggregate.

=== 2019 AFC Champions League ===
==== Preliminary round 2 ====
West Region
Team 1	Score	Team 2
Saipa (Iran)	4–0	(India) Minerva Punjab

=== 2019 AFC Cup ===
South Asia Zone
Team 1	Agg.	Team 2	1st leg	2nd leg
Colombo (Sri Lanka)	0–1	(India) Chennaiyin	0–0	0–1

Group E

Pos	Team	Pld	W	D	L	GF	GA	GD	Pts	Qualification	ABD	CFC	MIN	MMC
1	(Bangladesh) Abahani Limited Dhaka	6	4	1	1	12	5	+7	13	Inter-zone play-off semi-finals	—	3–2	2–2	5–0
2	(India) Chennaiyin	6	3	2	1	9	6	+3	11		1–0	—	0–0	2–0
3	(India) Minerva Punjab	6	0	5	1	6	7	−1	5		0–1	1–1	—	2–2
4	(Nepal) Manang Marshyangdi Club	6	0	2	4	5	14	−9	2		0–1	2–3	1–1	—

Source: AFC

== Club competitions ==
=== Indian Super League ===
Pos	Team	Pld	W	D	L	GF	GA	GD	Pts	Qualification
1	Bengaluru (Note: Qualified for 2020 AFC Cup qualifying play-offs) (C)	18	10	4	4	29	22	+7	34 (Note: Head-to-head standings: Bengaluru 6 pts, Goa 0 pts.)	Advance to ISL Playoffs
2	Goa	18	10	4	4	36	20	+16	34	Advance to ISL Playoffs
3	Mumbai City	18	9	3	6	25	20	+5	30	Advance to ISL Playoffs
4	NorthEast United	18	7	8	3	22	18	+4	29	Advance to ISL Playoffs
5	Jamshedpur	18	6	9	3	29	21	+8	27	
6	ATK	18	6	6	6	18	22	−4	24	
7	Pune City	18	6	4	8	24	30	−6	22	
8	Delhi Dynamos	18	4	6	8	23	27	−4	18	
9	Kerala Blasters	18	2	9	7	18	28	−10	15	
10	Chennaiyin	18	2	3	13	16	32	−16	9	

Source: Indian Super League
Rules for classification: 1) points; 2) head-to-head points; 3) head-to-head goal difference; 4) head-to-head goals scored; 5) goal difference; 5) number of goals scored; 6) fair play ranking; 6) drawing of lots
(C) Champions

==== Results ====
Home \ Away	KOL	BEN	CHE	DEL	GOA	JAM	KER	MUM	NEU	PUN
ATK	—	1–2	2–1	2–1	0–0	2–1	0–2	1–3	0–1	1–0
Bengaluru	1–0	—	1–0	1–0	3–0	2–2	2–2	1–1	2–1	2–1
Chennai	2–3	2–1	—	1–3	1–3	0–0	0–0	0–1	3–4	1–2
Delhi	1–2	3–2	0–0	—	0–0	2–2	2–0	2–4	0–2	1–1
Goa	3–0	1–2	1–0	3–2	—	0–0	3–0	5–0	5–1	4–2
Jamshedpur	1–1	5–1	3–1	2–1	4–1	—	2–2	1–0	0–0	1–4
Kerala Blasters	1–1	1–2	3–0	1–1	1–3	1–1	—	1–1	0–0	0–1
Mumbai City	0–0	1–0	2–0	2–0	0–2	0–2	6–1	—	0–2	2–0
NorthEast United	0–0	1–1	1–0	1–1	2–2	1–1	2–1	0–1	—	1–1
Pune City	2–2	0–3	2–4	1–3	2–0	2–1	1–1	2–1	0–2	—

Source: Indian Super League
Legend: Blue = home team win; Yellow = draw; Red = away team win.

==== Bracket ====
Semi-finals
1	Bengaluru	1	3	4
4	NorthEast United	2	0	2
2	Goa	5	0	5
3	Mumbai City	1	1	2

Final
1	Bengaluru	1
2	Goa	0

==== Semi-finals ====
Team 1	Agg.	Team 2	1st leg	2nd leg
NorthEast United	2–4	Bengaluru	2–1	0–3
Mumbai City	2–5	Goa	1–5	1–0

==== Final ====
17 March 2019
17:30 IST

Bengaluru	1–0	Goa
Rahul Bheke 117'	Report

Mumbai Football Arena, Mumbai
Attendance: 7,372
Referee: Muhammad Taqi Aljaafari Bin Jahari (Singapore)

=== I-League ===
Pos	Team	Pld	W	D	L	GF	GA	GD	Pts	Qualification or relegation
1	Chennai City (C)	20	13	4	3	48	28	+20	43	Qualification for AFC Champions League preliminary round 1 (Note: If the league champions cannot qualify for the AFC Champions League group stage, they will enter the AFC Cup group stage.)
2	East Bengal	20	13	3	4	37	20	+17	42	
3	Real Kashmir	20	10	7	3	25	14	+11	37 (Note: The game between Minerva Punjab and Real Kashmir was rescheduled, but eventually it was not played and both teams were awarded a point.)	
4	Churchill Brothers	20	9	7	4	35	23	+12	34	
5	Mohun Bagan	20	8	5	7	27	28	−1	29	
6	NEROCA	20	7	5	8	27	26	+1	26	
7	Aizawl	20	6	6	8	27	28	−1	24	
8	Indian Arrows	20	6	3	11	19	28	−9	21	
9	Minerva Punjab	20	4	6	10	10	19	−9	18	
10	Gokulam Kerala	20	3	8	9	25	33	−8	17	
11	Shillong Lajong (R)	20	3	2	15	23	56	−33	11	Relegation to I-League 2nd Division (withdrew)

Source: I-league
Rules for classification: 1) points; 2) head-to-head points; 3) head-to-head goal difference; 4) goal difference; 5) number of goals scored; 6) drawing of lots
(C) Champions; (R) Relegated

==== Promotion and relegation ====
Teams promoted

- Real Kashmir

Teams relegated

- None

==== Results ====
Home \ Away	AFC	CHE	CHU	EAB	GOK	INA	MIN	MOH	NER	REK	SHI
Aizawl	—	1–2	2–1	3–2	3–2	0–1	1–2	1–2	0–0	0–0	4–1
Chennai City	4–3	—	2–2	2–1	3–2	4–1	3–1	3–1	2–1	0–1	6–1
Churchill Brothers	4–1	3–2	—	1–2	3–1	2–1	2–0	1–1	2–1	1–1	4–2
East Bengal	1–1	1–2	1–1	—	3–1	1–0	0–1	3–2	2–1	1–1	5–0
Gokulam Kerala	1–3	2–3	1–1	1–2	—	1–1	1–0	1–1	2–1	1–1	3–1
Indian Arrows	0–0	0–2	0–1	1–2	1–0	—	2–1	0–2	2–3	2–2	1–0
Minerva Punjab	0–1	0–0	0–0	0–1	1–1	1–0	—	0–1	1–0	0–1	0–1
Mohun Bagan	2–2	1–1	0–3	0–2	2–2	1–3	2–0	—	1–0	1–2	2–0
NEROCA	0–0	3–3	2–1	0–2	1–1	3–0	0–0	2–1	—	2–3	3–2
Real Kashmir	1–0	1–0	0–0	1–2	1–0	2–0	– (Note: Both teams agreed to share one point each. Match was abandoned because of security issue.)	0–1	0–2	—	6–1
Shillong Lajong	2–1	2–4	3–2	1–3	1–1	0–3	2–2	2–3	1–2	0–1	—

Updated to match(es) played on 9 March 2019. Source:
Legend: Blue = home team win; Yellow = draw; Red = away team win.

=== Super Cup ===
Qualification round
15 March
Kerala Blasters	0
Indian Arrows	2

Round of 16
31 March
Pune City	2
Chennai City	4
30 March
Indian Arrows	0
Goa	3
29 March
Chennaiyin	2
Mumbai City	0
1 April
ATK	3
Real Kashmir	1

Quarter-finals
4 April
Bengaluru	1
Chennai City	2
6 April
Goa	4
Jamshedpur	3
7 April
Chennaiyin	2
NorthEast United	1
5 April
Delhi Dynamos	3
ATK	4

Semi-finals
9 April
Chennai City	0
Goa	3
10 April
Chennaiyin	2
ATK	0

Final
13 April
Goa	2
Chennaiyin	1

=== I-League 2nd Division ===
==== Preliminary round ====
===== Group A =====
Pos	Team	Pld	W	D	L	GF	GA	GD	Pts	Qualification
1	Bengaluru (R) (Note: Reserves team are ineligible for advance to the next round)	8	7	1	0	26	3	+23	22	
2	Goa (R)	8	5	0	3	17	7	+10	15	
3	Lonestar Kashmir	8	3	2	3	8	13	−5	11	Advance to Final Round
4	ARA	8	3	1	4	10	14	−4	10	
5	Hindustan	8	0	0	8	5	29	−24	0	

Source: Soccerway

===== Group B =====
Pos	Team	Pld	W	D	L	GF	GA	GD	Pts	Qualification
1	Ozone	8	6	2	0	19	6	+13	20	Advance to Final Round
2	Fateh Hyderabad	8	4	1	3	12	9	+3	13	
3	Kerala Blasters (R) (Note: Reserves team are ineligible for advance to the next round)	8	2	2	4	8	13	−5	8	
4	South United	8	1	4	3	10	16	−6	7	
5	Chennaiyin (R)	8	1	3	4	8	13	−5	6	

Source: Soccerway

===== Group C =====
Pos	Team	Pld	W	D	L	GF	GA	GD	Pts	Qualification
1	Chhinga Veng	10	6	2	2	18	11	+7	20	Advance to Final Round
2	TRAU	10	5	2	3	17	20	−3	17	Advance to Final Round
3	Mohammedan	10	5	1	4	21	13	+8	16	
4	ATK (R) (Note: Reserves team are ineligible for advance to the next round)	10	4	2	4	15	14	+1	14	
5	Rainbow	10	3	4	3	17	16	+1	13	
6	Jamshedpur (R)	10	1	1	8	10	24	−14	4	

Source: Soccerway

==== Final round ====
Pos	Team	Pld	W	D	L	GF	GA	GD	Pts	Qualification
1	TRAU (Q)	6	5	0	1	13	5	+8	15	Promotion to I-League
2	Chhinga Veng	6	4	1	1	12	6	+6	13	
3	Ozone	5	1	0	4	4	6	−2	3	
4	Lonestar Kashmir	5	0	1	4	3	15	−12	1	

Source: Soccerway
(Q) Qualified for the phase indicated

=== Indian Women's League ===
==== Group stage ====
===== Cluster I =====
Pos	Team	Pld	W	D	L	GF	GA	GD	Pts	Qualification
1	Gokulam Kerala	5	5	0	0	16	1	+15	15	Semi Final
2	Central SSB Women	5	4	0	1	10	7	+3	12	Semi Final
3	Hans Women FC	5	2	0	3	6	9	−3	6	
4	Panjim Footballers	5	1	1	3	7	13	−6	4	
5	Rising Student's Club	5	1	1	3	4	10	−6	4	
6	FC Alakhpura	5	1	0	4	3	6	−3	3	

Source: AIFF
Rules for classification: 1) points; 2) head-to-head points; 3) head-to-head goal difference; 4) goal difference; 5) number of goals scored; 6) drawing of lots

===== Cluster II =====
Pos	Team	Pld	W	D	L	GF	GA	GD	Pts	Qualification
1	Sethu	5	5	0	0	34	4	+30	15	Semi Final
2	Manipur Police	5	4	0	1	37	8	+29	12	Semi Final
3	FC Kolhapur City	5	2	1	2	8	20	−12	7	
4	SAI-STC Cuttack	5	2	0	3	5	21	−16	6	
5	Bangalore United FC	5	1	1	3	3	15	−12	4	
6	Baroda Football Academy	5	0	0	5	4	23	−19	0	

Source: AIFF
Rules for classification: 1) points; 2) head-to-head points; 3) head-to-head goal difference; 4) goal difference; 5) number of goals scored; 6) drawing of lots

==== Knock–out stage ====
Semi-finals
1	Gokulam Kerala	2
4	Manipur Police	4
3	Sethu	8
2	Central SSB Women's	1

Final
Manipur Police	1
Sethu	3
