= 2019 AFC Cup group stage =

International football competition

The 2019 AFC Cup group stage was played from 25 February to 26 June 2019. A total of 36 teams competed in the group stage to decide the 11 places in the knockout stage of the 2019 AFC Cup.

== Draw ==
The draw for the group stage was held on 22 November 2018, 14:00 MYT (UTC+8), at the AFC House in Kuala Lumpur, Malaysia. The 36 teams were drawn into nine groups of four: three groups each in the West Asia Zone (Groups A–C) and the ASEAN Zone (Groups F–H), and one group each in the Central Asia Zone (Group D), the South Asia Zone (Group E), and the East Asia Zone (Group I). Teams from the same association in the West Asia Zone and ASEAN Zone cannot be drawn into the same group.

The mechanism of the draw was as follows:

- For the West Asia Zone, a draw was held for the five associations with two direct entrants (Syria, Jordan, Kuwait, Bahrain, Lebanon) to determine the order of associations occupying the following group positions (higher-seeded team of each association allocated to first position, lower-seeded team of each association allocated to second position): A1 and B2, B1 and C2, C1 and A2, A3 and B4, B3 and C4. The direct entrant from Oman and the play-off winners were allocated to positions C3 and A4 respectively.
- For the ASEAN Zone, a draw was held for the five associations with two direct entrants (Vietnam, Philippines, Singapore, Indonesia, Myanmar) to determine the order of associations occupying the following group positions (higher-seeded team of each association allocated to first position, lower-seeded team of each association allocated to second position): F1 and G2, G1 and H2, H1 and F2, F3 and G4, G3 and H4. The direct entrants from Laos and Cambodia were allocated to positions H3 and F4 respectively.
- For the Central Asia Zone, the South Asia Zone, and the East Asia Zone, no draw was held. The direct entrants were allocated to group positions 1, 2 and 3 according to their association ranking (Central Asia Zone: Tajikistan, Turkmenistan, Kyrgyzstan; South Asia Zone: India, Bangladesh, Nepal; East Asia Zone: Hong Kong, North Korea, Chinese Taipei), and the play-off winners were allocated to group positions 4.

The following 36 teams entered into the group stage draw, which included the 32 direct entrants and the four winners of the play-off round of the qualifying play-offs, whose identity was not known at the time of the draw.

Zone	Groups	Teams			
West Asia Zone	A–C	(Syria) Al-Jaish	(Syria) Al-Ittihad	(Bahrain) Al-Najma	(Bahrain) Malkiya
West Asia Zone	A–C	(Jordan) Al-Wehdat	(Jordan) Al-Jazeera	(Lebanon) Al-Ahed	(Lebanon) Nejmeh
West Asia Zone	A–C	Al-Kuwait	(Kuwait) Al-Qadsia	(Oman) Al-Suwaiq	(Palestine) Hilal Al-Quds (Winners of Play-off West Asia)
Central Asia Zone	D	(Tajikistan) Istiklol	(Turkmenistan) Altyn Asyr	(Kyrgyzstan) Dordoi	(Tajikistan) Khujand (Winners of Play-off Central Asia)
South Asia Zone	E	(India) Minerva Punjab	(Bangladesh) Abahani Limited Dhaka (Note: The identity of the teams from Bangladesh, Nepal and Indonesia (both group stage and standby teams) was not known at the time of the group stage draw.)	(Nepal) Manang Marshyangdi Club	(India) Chennaiyin (Winners of Play-off South Asia)
ASEAN Zone	F–H	(Vietnam) Hà Nội	(Vietnam) Becamex Bình Dương	(Indonesia) Persija Jakarta	(Indonesia) PSM Makassar
ASEAN Zone	F–H	(Philippines) Ceres–Negros	(Philippines) Kaya–Iloilo	(Myanmar) Yangon United	(Myanmar) Shan United
ASEAN Zone	F–H	(Singapore) Home United	(Singapore) Tampines Rovers	(Laos) Lao Toyota	(Cambodia) Nagaworld
East Asia Zone	I	(Hong Kong) Kitchee	(North Korea) April 25	(Chinese Taipei) Hang Yuen	(Hong Kong) Tai Po (Winners of Play-off East Asia)

Standby teams (Note: The standby teams would replace a team from the same association which played in the AFC Champions League qualifying play-offs and advanced to the AFC Champions League group stage. There were no standby teams from India (for Minerva Punjab), Vietnam (for Hà Nội), and Singapore (for Home United).)

- (Jordan) ~~Al-Faisaly (for Al-Wehdat)~~
- ~~Kazma (for Al-Kuwait)~~
- (Tajikistan) ~~Regar-TadAZ (for Istiklol)~~
- (Philippines) ~~Davao Aguilas (for Ceres–Negros)~~ (Note: Davao Aguilas were the standby team from Philippines at the time of the draw, but were not active in 2019.)
- (Indonesia) ~~Bhayangkara (for Persija Jakarta)~~
- (Myanmar) ~~Zwekapin United (for Yangon United)~~
- (Hong Kong) ~~Pegasus (for Kitchee)~~

== Format ==
In the group stage, each group was played on a home-and-away round-robin basis. The following teams advanced to the knockout stage:

- The winners of each group and the best runners-up in the West Asia Zone and the ASEAN Zone advanced to the Zonal semi-finals.
- The winners of each group in the Central Asia Zone, the South Asia Zone, and the East Asia Zone advanced to the Inter-zone play-off semi-finals.

In the event that a group contains only three teams, it might be played on a double round-robin basis hosted by two of the teams if at least two of the three teams agree to this format (Regulations Article 10.1.7).

=== Tiebreakers ===
The teams were ranked according to points (3 points for a win, 1 point for a draw, 0 points for a loss). If tied on points, tiebreakers were applied in the following order (Regulations Article 10.5):

1. Points in head-to-head matches among tied teams;
2. Goal difference in head-to-head matches among tied teams;
3. Goals scored in head-to-head matches among tied teams;
4. Away goals scored in head-to-head matches among tied teams;
5. If more than two teams were tied, and after applying all head-to-head criteria above, a subset of teams were still tied, all head-to-head criteria above were reapplied exclusively to this subset of teams;
6. Goal difference in all group matches;
7. Goals scored in all group matches;
8. Penalty shoot-out if only two teams playing each other in the last round of the group were tied;
9. Disciplinary points (yellow card = 1 point, red card as a result of two yellow cards = 3 points, direct red card = 3 points, yellow card followed by direct red card = 4 points);
10. Association ranking.

== Schedule ==
The schedule of each matchday is as follows (W: West Asia Zone; C: Central Asia Zone; S: South Asia Zone; A: ASEAN Zone; E: East Asia Zone).

- Matches in the West Asia Zone were played on Mondays and Tuesdays. One or two groups were played on each day, with the following groups played on Mondays:
  - Matchdays 1 and 2: Groups A and B
  - Matchday 3: Groups A and C
  - Matchday 4: Group B
  - Matchdays 5 and 6: Group C
- Matches in the ASEAN Zone were played on Tuesdays and Wednesdays. One or two groups were played on each day, with the following groups played on Tuesdays:
  - Matchdays 1 and 2: Groups F and G
  - Matchday 3: Groups F and H
  - Matchday 4: Group G
  - Matchdays 5 and 6: Group H
- Matches in the Central Asia Zone, the South Asia Zone, and the East Asia Zone were played on Wednesdays. If two teams from the same association were scheduled to play at home on the same matchday, the home match of the lower-seeded team was moved to Tuesday.

Matchday	Dates		Matches
Matchday	W, A	C, S, E	Matches
Matchday 1	25–27 February 2019	3 April 2019	Team 1 vs. Team 4, Team 3 vs. Team 2
Matchday 2	11–13 March 2019	17 April 2019	Team 4 vs. Team 3, Team 2 vs. Team 1
Matchday 3	1–3 April & 3 May 2019	30 April – 1 May 2019	Team 4 vs. Team 2, Team 1 vs. Team 3
Matchday 4	15–17 & 23 April & 6 May 2019	15 May 2019	Team 2 vs. Team 4, Team 3 vs. Team 1
Matchday 5	29 April – 1 May 2019	19 June 2019	Team 4 vs. Team 1, Team 2 vs. Team 3
Matchday 6	13–15 May 2019	26 June 2019	Team 1 vs. Team 2, Team 3 vs. Team 4

== Groups ==
=== Group A ===
Pos	Team	Pld	W	D	L	GF	GA	GD	Pts	Qualification	WEH	JAI	HAQ	NEJ
1	(Jordan) Al-Wehdat	6	4	1	1	12	4	+8	13	Zonal semi-finals	—	1–1	2–0	1–0
2	(Syria) Al-Jaish	6	2	4	0	6	4	+2	10	Zonal semi-finals	1–0	—	1–1	2–2
3	(Palestine) Hilal Al-Quds	6	2	2	2	7	11	−4	8		2–6	0–0	—	2–1
4	(Lebanon) Nejmeh	6	0	1	5	4	10	−6	1		0–2	0–1	1–2	—

Source: AFC
Rules for classification: Group stage tiebreakers
25 February 2019
19:00 UTC+3

Al-Jaish (Syria)	1–1	(Palestine) Hilal Al-Quds
Ashkar 49'	Live Report; Stats Report	Obaid 18'

Al Muharraq Stadium, Arad (Bahrain) (Note: Teams from Syria were not allowed to host their home matches in their country due to security concerns.)
Attendance: 48
Referee: Pranjal Banerjee (India)
25 February 2019
19:00 UTC+2

Al-Wehdat (Jordan)	1–0	(Lebanon) Nejmeh
Murjan 11'	Live Report; Stats Report

King Abdullah II Stadium, Amman
Attendance: 4,395
Referee: Hasan Akrami (Iran)

11 March 2019
16:00 UTC+2

Hilal Al-Quds (Palestine)	2–6	(Jordan) Al-Wehdat
Abdallah 26'; Dabbagh 89' (pen.)	Live Report; Stats Report	Al-Basha 16'; Faisal 35', 38', 41', 86'; Rateb 78'

Faisal Al-Husseini International Stadium, Al-Ram
Attendance: 8,000
Referee: Çarymyrat Kurbanow (Turkmenistan)
11 March 2019
19:00 UTC+2

Nejmeh (Lebanon)	0–1	(Syria) Al-Jaish
	Live Report; Stats Report	Moustafa 39'

Camille Chamoun Sports City Stadium, Beirut
Attendance: 54
Referee: Yu Ming-hsun (Chinese Taipei)

1 April 2019
19:00 UTC+3

Al-Jaish (Syria)	1–0	(Jordan) Al-Wehdat
Ashkar 72'	Live Report; Stats Report

Al Muharraq Stadium, Arad (Bahrain)
Attendance: 230
Referee: Ilgiz Tantashev (Uzbekistan)

16 April 2019
19:00 UTC+3

Al-Wehdat (Jordan)	1–1	(Syria) Al-Jaish
Abdel-Fattah 86'	Live Report; Stats Report	Moustafa 53'

King Abdullah II Stadium, Amman
Attendance: 3,504
Referee: Ali Shaban (Kuwait)

30 April 2019
19:00 UTC+3

Nejmeh (Lebanon)	0–2	(Jordan) Al-Wehdat
	Live Report; Stats Report	Faisal 5'; Rateb 66'

Camille Chamoun Sports City Stadium, Beirut
Attendance: 3,257
Referee: Saoud Al-Athbah (Qatar)
30 April 2019
19:25 UTC+3 (Note: The Hilal Al-Quds v Al-Jaish match, originally scheduled to be played on 30 April 2019, 17:00 UTC+3, at Faisal Al-Husseini International Stadium, Al-Ram, was moved to a neutral venue.)

Hilal Al-Quds (Palestine)	0–0	(Syria) Al-Jaish
	Live Report; Stats Report

King Abdullah Sports City, Jeddah (Saudi Arabia)
Attendance: 423
Referee: Sivakorn Pu-udom (Thailand)

3 May 2019 (Note: The Hilal Al-Quds v Nejmeh match, originally scheduled to be played on 1 April 2019, 17:00 UTC+3, at Faisal Al-Husseini International Stadium, Al-Ram, was postponed as Nejmeh failed to arrive for the match. The match was rescheduled to 3 May 2019 and moved to a neutral venue.)
19:25 UTC+3

Hilal Al-Quds (Palestine)	2–1	(Lebanon) Nejmeh
Dabbagh 38'; Yameen 69'	Live Report; Stats Report	Maatouk 80'

King Abdullah Sports City, Jeddah (Saudi Arabia)
Attendance: 682
Referee: Omar Mohamed Al-Ali (United Arab Emirates)

6 May 2019 (Note: The Nejmeh v Hilal Al-Quds match, originally scheduled to be played on 16 April 2019, 19:00 UTC+3, at Camille Chamoun Sports City Stadium, Beirut, was rescheduled to 6 May 2019 and moved to a neutral venue.)
21:00 UTC+3

Nejmeh (Lebanon)	1–2	(Palestine) Hilal Al-Quds
Hamam 54'	Live Report; Stats Report	Dabbagh 78', 90+2'

King Abdullah Sports City, Jeddah (Saudi Arabia)
Attendance: 98
Referee: Dmitriy Mashentsev (Kyrgyzstan)

14 May 2019
22:00 UTC+3

Al-Jaish (Syria)	2–2	(Lebanon) Nejmeh
Al Wakid 45'; Moustafa 59'	Live Report; Stats Report	Maatouk 56'; Hamam 67'

Al Muharraq Stadium, Arad (Bahrain)
Attendance: 33
Referee: Rowan Arumughan (India)
14 May 2019
22:00 UTC+3

Al-Wehdat (Jordan)	2–0	(Palestine) Hilal Al-Quds
Ayed 51'; Faisal 86'	Live Report; Stats Report

King Abdullah II Stadium, Amman
Attendance: 7,817
Referee: Mooud Bonyadifar (Iran)

=== Group B ===
Pos	Team	Pld	W	D	L	GF	GA	GD	Pts	Qualification	JAZ	KUW	NAJ	ITH
1	(Jordan) Al-Jazeera	6	5	1	0	13	2	+11	16	Zonal semi-finals	—	1–0	3–0	4–0
2	Al-Kuwait	6	3	1	2	6	4	+2	10		1–2	—	2–1	0–0
3	(Bahrain) Al-Najma	6	2	1	3	6	9	−3	7		1–1	0–1	—	2–1
4	(Syria) Al-Ittihad	6	0	1	5	2	12	−10	1		0–2	0–2	1–2	—

Source: AFC
Rules for classification: Group stage tiebreakers
25 February 2019
18:15 UTC+3

Al-Kuwait	0–0	(Syria) Al-Ittihad
	Live Report; Stats Report

Al Kuwait Sports Club Stadium, Kuwait City
Attendance: 627
Referee: Timur Faizullin (Kyrgyzstan)
25 February 2019
19:00 UTC+3

Al-Najma (Bahrain)	1–1	(Jordan) Al-Jazeera
Habeeb 31'	Live Report; Stats Report	Al-Mardi 18'

Bahrain National Stadium, Riffa
Attendance: 100
Referee: Zaid Thamer Mohammed (Iraq)

11 March 2019
19:15 UTC+4

Al-Ittihad (Syria)	1–2	(Bahrain) Al-Najma
Muhtadi 38'	Live Report; Stats Report	Madan 32'; Dramé 60'

Mohammed bin Zayed Stadium, Abu Dhabi (United Arab Emirates)
Attendance: 467
Referee: Mahmood Al-Majarafi (Oman)
11 March 2019
17:30 UTC+2

Al-Jazeera (Jordan)	1–0	Al-Kuwait
Za'tara 59'	Live Report; Stats Report

Amman International Stadium, Amman
Attendance: 343
Referee: Suhaizi Shukri (Malaysia)

2 April 2019
17:30 UTC+3

Al-Jazeera (Jordan)	4–0	(Syria) Al-Ittihad
Tannous 50'; Al-Mardi 53'; Al-Rawabdeh 82'; Samir 90+3'	Live Report; Stats Report

Amman International Stadium, Amman
Attendance: 511
Referee: Jansen Foo (Singapore)
2 April 2019
19:00 UTC+3

Al-Najma (Bahrain)	0–1	Al-Kuwait
	Live Report; Stats Report	Al-Khamees 90+5'

Bahrain National Stadium, Riffa
Attendance: 80
Referee: Ahmad A'Qashah (Singapore)

15 April 2019
19:30 UTC+4

Al-Ittihad (Syria)	0–2	(Jordan) Al-Jazeera
	Live Report; Stats Report	Shelbaieh 13' (pen.); Al-Rawabdeh 43'

Al Nahyan Stadium, Abu Dhabi (United Arab Emirates)
Attendance: 363
Referee: Bijan Heidari (Iran)
15 April 2019
18:50 UTC+3

Al-Kuwait	2–1	(Bahrain) Al-Najma
Husain 45+6'; Saeed 61'	Live Report; Stats Report	Dramé 66'

Al Kuwait Sports Club Stadium, Kuwait City
Attendance: 1,121
Referee: Kim Woo-sung (South Korea)

30 April 2019
17:30 UTC+3

Al-Jazeera (Jordan)	3–0	(Bahrain) Al-Najma
Tannous 62'; Khairullah 70'; Samir 89'	Live Report; Stats Report

Amman International Stadium, Amman
Attendance: 211
Referee: Mohammed Al-Hoish (Saudi Arabia)
30 April 2019
19:30 UTC+4

Al-Ittihad (Syria)	0–2	Al-Kuwait
	Live Report; Stats Report	Saeed 41', 79'

Al Nahyan Stadium, Abu Dhabi (United Arab Emirates)
Attendance: 254
Referee: Omar Al-Yaqoubi (Oman)

14 May 2019
22:00 UTC+3

Al-Najma (Bahrain)	2–1	(Syria) Al-Ittihad
Muneer 13'; Madan 36'	Live Report; Stats Report	Al Shaban 72'

Bahrain National Stadium, Riffa
Attendance: 50
Referee: Kim Hee-gon (South Korea)
14 May 2019
22:00 UTC+3

Al-Kuwait	1–2	(Jordan) Al-Jazeera
Al Hajri 70'	Live Report; Stats Report	Za'tara 74'; Samir 90' (pen.)

Al Kuwait Sports Club Stadium, Kuwait City
Attendance: 300
Referee: Sivakorn Pu-udom (Thailand)

=== Group C ===
Pos	Team	Pld	W	D	L	GF	GA	GD	Pts	Qualification	AHE	MAL	QAD	SUW
1	(Lebanon) Al-Ahed	6	4	2	0	8	3	+5	14	Zonal semi-finals	—	2–1	0–0	4–2
2	(Bahrain) Malkiya	6	2	2	2	8	8	0	8		0–0	—	1–2	2–2
3	(Kuwait) Al-Qadsia	6	2	1	3	6	6	0	7		0–1	1–2	—	2–0
4	(Oman) Al-Suwaiq	6	1	1	4	7	12	−5	4		0–1	1–2	2–1	—

Source: AFC
Rules for classification: Group stage tiebreakers
26 February 2019
17:00 UTC+2

Al-Ahed (Lebanon)	0–0	(Kuwait) Al-Qadsia
	Live Report; Stats Report

Camille Chamoun Sports City Stadium, Beirut
Attendance: 2,325
Referee: Dmitriy Mashentsev (Kyrgyzstan)
26 February 2019
19:30 UTC+4

Al-Suwaiq (Oman)	1–2	(Bahrain) Malkiya
Al-Ghassani 23'	Live Report; Stats Report	Isa 31'; Al-Bari 59'

Al-Seeb Stadium, Seeb
Attendance: 500
Referee: Nazmi Nasaruddin (Malaysia)

12 March 2019
19:00 UTC+3

Malkiya (Bahrain)	0–0	(Lebanon) Al-Ahed
	Live Report; Stats Report

Khalifa Sports City Stadium, Isa Town
Attendance: 437
Referee: Nasrullo Kabirov (Tajikistan)
12 March 2019
19:30 UTC+3

Al-Qadsia (Kuwait)	2–0	(Oman) Al-Suwaiq
Nasser 30'; Al-Dhefiri 89'	Live Report; Stats Report

Jaber Al-Ahmad International Stadium, Kuwait City
Attendance: 1,200
Referee: Bijan Heidari (Iran)

1 April 2019
17:00 UTC+3

Al-Ahed (Lebanon)	4–2	(Oman) Al-Suwaiq
Mansour 1'; Kdouh 16', 60', 69'	Live Report; Stats Report	Al Zaabi 37'; K. Al Alawi 85'

Camille Chamoun Sports City Stadium, Beirut
Attendance: 1,000
Referee: Khamis Al-Marri (Qatar)
1 April 2019
19:45 UTC+3

Al-Qadsia (Kuwait)	1–2	(Bahrain) Malkiya
Nasser 70' (pen.)	Live Report; Stats Report	Isa 42', 72'

Jaber Al-Ahmad International Stadium, Kuwait City
Attendance: 2,300
Referee: Thoriq Munir Alkatiri (Indonesia)

16 April 2019
19:30 UTC+4

Al-Suwaiq (Oman)	0–1	(Lebanon) Al-Ahed
	Live Report; Stats Report	Kdouh 62'

Al-Seeb Stadium, Seeb
Attendance: 385
Referee: Ho Wai Sing (Hong Kong)
16 April 2019
19:00 UTC+3

Malkiya (Bahrain)	1–2	(Kuwait) Al-Qadsia
Al-Bari 43'	Live Report; Stats Report	Al-Mutawa 7', 36'

Khalifa Sports City Stadium, Isa Town
Attendance: 1,384
Referee: Timur Faizullin (Kyrgyzstan)

29 April 2019
19:00 UTC+3

Malkiya (Bahrain)	2–2	(Oman) Al-Suwaiq
Hassan 41'; Isa 66' (pen.)	Live Report; Stats Report	Al-Ghassani 71'; K. Al Alawi 87'

Khalifa Sports City Stadium, Isa Town
Attendance: 147
Referee: Masoud Tufayelieh (Syria)
29 April 2019
20:15 UTC+3

Al-Qadsia (Kuwait)	0–1	(Lebanon) Al-Ahed
	Live Report; Stats Report	Al Salih 42'

Jaber Al-Ahmad International Stadium, Kuwait City
Attendance: 1,600
Referee: Rowan Arumughan (India)

13 May 2019
21:00 UTC+3

Al-Ahed (Lebanon)	2–1	(Bahrain) Malkiya
Zreik 34'; Khamis 52'	Live Report; Stats Report	Al-Bari 14'

Camille Chamoun Sports City Stadium, Beirut
Attendance: 2,155
Referee: Sherzod Kasimov (Uzbekistan)
13 May 2019
22:00 UTC+4

Al-Suwaiq (Oman)	2–1	(Kuwait) Al-Qadsia
K. Al Alawi 20'; Al-Ghassani 53'	Live Report; Stats Report	Al-Dhefiri 87'

Al-Seeb Stadium, Seeb
Attendance: 150
Referee: Yudai Yamamoto (Japan)

=== Group D ===
Pos	Team	Pld	W	D	L	GF	GA	GD	Pts	Qualification	ALT	IST	DOR	KHU
1	(Turkmenistan) Altyn Asyr	6	2	4	0	7	4	+3	10	Inter-zone play-off semi-finals	—	1–1	3–1	1–0
2	(Tajikistan) Istiklol	6	2	2	2	12	8	+4	8		1–1	—	4–1	3–0
3	(Kyrgyzstan) Dordoi	6	2	1	3	9	12	−3	7 (Note: Head-to-head results: Khujand 3–1 Dordoi, Dordoi 3–0 Khujand.)		1–1	2–1	—	3–0
4	(Tajikistan) Khujand	6	2	1	3	6	10	−4	7		0–0	3–2	3–1	—

Source: AFC
Rules for classification: Group stage tiebreakers
Notes:
3 April 2019
19:00 UTC+5

Istiklol (Tajikistan)	3–0	(Tajikistan) Khujand
Koryan 50', 71'; A. Dzhalilov 68' (pen.)	Live Report; Stats Report

Pamir Stadium, Dushanbe
Attendance: 12,800
Referee: Nivon Robesh Gamini (Sri Lanka)
3 April 2019
20:00 UTC+6

Dordoi (Kyrgyzstan)	1–1	(Turkmenistan) Altyn Asyr
Orazsähedow 45+1'	Live Report; Stats Report	Annasähedow 85'

Dolen Omurzakov Stadium, Bishkek
Attendance: 8,101
Referee: Saoud Al-Athbah (Qatar)

17 April 2019
16:00 UTC+5

Khujand (Tajikistan)	3–1	(Kyrgyzstan) Dordoi
Vasiev 42', 63'; J. Ergashev 90' (pen.)	Live Report; Stats Report	Sagynbaev 17'

20 Years of Independence Stadium, Khujand
Attendance: 7,200
Referee: C. R. Srikrishna (India)
17 April 2019
17:00 UTC+5

Altyn Asyr (Turkmenistan)	1–1	(Tajikistan) Istiklol
Nurmyradow 80'	Live Report; Stats Report	Boboev 79'

Köpetdag Stadium, Ashgabat
Attendance: 11,300
Referee: Abdulla Al-Marri (Qatar)

30 April 2019
16:00 UTC+5

Khujand (Tajikistan)	0–0	(Turkmenistan) Altyn Asyr
	Live Report; Stats Report

20 Years of Independence Stadium, Khujand
Attendance: 5,200
Referee: Khalid Al-Turais (Saudi Arabia)
1 May 2019
19:00 UTC+5

Istiklol (Tajikistan)	4–1	(Kyrgyzstan) Dordoi
A. Dzhalilov 15' (pen.); Fatkhuloev 43' (pen.); Cakić 49'; Samiev 81'	Live Report; Stats Report	Murzaev 50'

Pamir Stadium, Dushanbe
Attendance: 13,200
Referee: Mohammad Arafah (Jordan)

15 May 2019
18:30 UTC+5

Altyn Asyr (Turkmenistan)	1–0	(Tajikistan) Khujand
Ýakşiýew 32'	Live Report; Stats Report

Köpetdag Stadium, Ashgabat
Attendance: 12,300
Referee: Ahmed Al-Ali (Jordan)
15 May 2019
20:00 UTC+6

Dordoi (Kyrgyzstan)	2–1	(Tajikistan) Istiklol
Orazsähedow 57'; Murzaev 77'	Live Report; Stats Report	A. Dzhalilov 29'

Dolen Omurzakov Stadium, Bishkek
Attendance: 4,435
Referee: Ali Reda (Lebanon)

19 June 2019
17:30 UTC+5

Khujand (Tajikistan)	3–2	(Tajikistan) Istiklol
J. Ergashev 4'; Rustamov 40'; Vasiev 72'	Live Report; Stats Report	Kimsanov 30'; Panjshanbe 64'

20 Years of Independence Stadium, Khujand
Attendance: 6,850
Referee: Ali Shaban (Kuwait)
19 June 2019
19:00 UTC+5

Altyn Asyr (Turkmenistan)	3–1	(Kyrgyzstan) Dordoi
Annadurdyýew 23'; Baimatov 62' (o.g.); Ýakşiýew 89'	Live Report; Stats Report	Batyrkanov 86'

Köpetdag Stadium, Ashgabat
Attendance: 11,250
Referee: Yudai Yamamoto (Japan)

26 June 2019
19:00 UTC+5

Istiklol (Tajikistan)	1–1	(Turkmenistan) Altyn Asyr
Fatkhuloev 57'	Live Report; Stats Report	Annadurdyýew 49'

Pamir Stadium, Dushanbe
Attendance: 14,000
Referee: Sultan Al-Marzooqi (United Arab Emirates)
26 June 2019
20:00 UTC+6

Dordoi (Kyrgyzstan)	3–0	(Tajikistan) Khujand
Orazsähedow 6'; Murzaev 45+1' (pen.); Valikayev 60'	Live Report; Stats Report

Dolen Omurzakov Stadium, Bishkek
Attendance: 1,100
Referee: Masoud Tufayelieh (Syria)

=== Group E ===
Pos	Team	Pld	W	D	L	GF	GA	GD	Pts	Qualification	ABD	CFC	MIN	MMC
1	(Bangladesh) Abahani Limited Dhaka	6	4	1	1	12	5	+7	13	Inter-zone play-off semi-finals	—	3–2	2–2	5–0
2	(India) Chennaiyin	6	3	2	1	9	6	+3	11		1–0	—	0–0	2–0
3	(India) Minerva Punjab	6	0	5	1	6	7	−1	5		0–1	1–1	—	2–2
4	(Nepal) Manang Marshyangdi Club	6	0	2	4	5	14	−9	2		0–1	2–3	1–1	—

Source: AFC
Rules for classification: Group stage tiebreakers
3 April 2019
15:00 UTC+5:45

Manang Marshyangdi Club (Nepal)	0–1	(Bangladesh) Abahani Limited Dhaka
	Live Report; Stats Report	Saighani 28'

ANFA Complex, Lalitpur
Attendance: 1,776
Referee: Ali Reda (Lebanon)
3 April 2019 (Note: The matches between Minerva Punjab and Chennaiyin on Matchdays 1 and 5, were reversed from the original scheduled dates of 3 April 2019 and 19 June 2019.)
19:30 UTC+5:30

Chennaiyin (India)	0–0	(India) Minerva Punjab
	Live Report; Stats Report

The Arena, Ahmedabad
Attendance: 1,656
Referee: Lau Fong Hei (Hong Kong)

17 April 2019
17:45 UTC+6

Abahani Limited Dhaka (Bangladesh)	2–2	(India) Minerva Punjab
Jibon 20'; Chizoba 48'	Live Report; Stats Report	Al-Amnah 16'; Gopalan 42'

Bangabandhu National Stadium, Dhaka
Attendance: 1,700
Referee: Khalid Al-Shaqsi (Oman)
17 April 2019
19:30 UTC+5:30

Chennaiyin (India)	2–0	(Nepal) Manang Marshyangdi Club
Herd 51'; Maílson 53'	Live Report; Stats Report

The Arena, Ahmedabad
Attendance: 1,271
Referee: Qasim Al-Hatmi (Oman)

30 April 2019
19:30 UTC+5:30

Chennaiyin (India)	1–0	(Bangladesh) Abahani Limited Dhaka
Thapa 79'	Live Report; Stats Report

The Arena, Ahmedabad
Attendance: 1,224
Referee: Razlan Joffri Ali (Malaysia)
1 May 2019
18:30 UTC+5:30

Minerva Punjab (India)	2–2	(Nepal) Manang Marshyangdi Club
Gopalan 8'; Omolaja 86' (pen.)	Live Report; Stats Report	Rijal 69'; Somide 90'

Kalinga Stadium, Bhubaneswar
Attendance: 2,532
Referee: Ismaeel Habib Ali Ismaeel (Bahrain)

15 May 2019
15:00 UTC+5:45

Manang Marshyangdi Club (Nepal)	1–1	(India) Minerva Punjab
Azeez 81'	Live Report; Stats Report	T. Singh 39'

ANFA Complex, Lalitpur
Attendance: 1,527
Referee: Shukri Al-Hunfush (Saudi Arabia)
15 May 2019
19:00 UTC+6

Abahani Limited Dhaka (Bangladesh)	3–2	(India) Chennaiyin
Belfort 64'; Saighani 69'; Mamunul 88'	Live Report; Stats Report	Vineeth 6'; Vanmalsawma 74'

Bangabandhu National Stadium, Dhaka
Attendance: 850
Referee: Hanna Hattab (Syria)

19 June 2019
15:00 UTC+5:30

Minerva Punjab (India)	1–1	(India) Chennaiyin
Lalmuanpuia 62'	Live Report; Stats Report	Rafi 90'

Indira Gandhi Athletic Stadium, Guwahati
Attendance: 850
Referee: Hussein Abo Yehia (Lebanon)
19 June 2019
17:45 UTC+6

Abahani Limited Dhaka (Bangladesh)	5–0	(Nepal) Manang Marshyangdi Club
Jibon 11'; Belfort 45+2'; Jewel 63'; Chizoba 75'; Mamunul 90+5'	Live Report; Stats Report

Bangabandhu National Stadium, Dhaka
Attendance: 975
Referee: Nasrullo Kabirov (Tajikistan)

26 June 2019
16:00 UTC+5:30

Minerva Punjab (India)	0–1	(Bangladesh) Abahani Limited Dhaka
	Live Report; Stats Report	Saighani 90+3'

Indira Gandhi Athletic Stadium, Guwahati
Attendance: 927
Referee: Jumpei Iida (Japan)
26 June 2019
16:15 UTC+5:45

Manang Marshyangdi Club (Nepal)	2–3	(India) Chennaiyin
Oladipo 71', 79'	Live Report; Stats Report	Rafi 53', 88'; Sabiá 66'

ANFA Complex, Lalitpur
Attendance: 857
Referee: Omar Al-Yaqoubi (Oman)

=== Group F ===
Pos	Team	Pld	W	D	L	GF	GA	GD	Pts	Qualification	HAN	TAM	YAN	NAG
1	(Vietnam) Hà Nội	6	4	1	1	23	5	+18	13 (Note: Head-to-head results: Tampines Rovers 1–1 Hà Nội, Hà Nội 2–0 Tampines Rovers.)	Zonal semi-finals	—	2–0	0–1	10–0
2	(Singapore) Tampines Rovers	6	4	1	1	17	10	+7	13		1–1	—	4–3	4–2
3	(Myanmar) Yangon United	6	2	0	4	10	14	−4	6		2–5	1–3	—	2–0
4	(Cambodia) Nagaworld	6	1	0	5	6	27	−21	3		1–5	1–5	2–1	—

Source: AFC
Rules for classification: Group stage tiebreakers
Notes:
26 February 2019
15:30 UTC+6:30

Yangon United (Myanmar)	1–3	(Singapore) Tampines Rovers
Sylla 13'	Live Report; Stats Report	Khairul 55'; Mehmedović 61'; Megumi 68'

Thuwunna Stadium, Yangon
Attendance: 675
Referee: Shukri Al-Hunfush (Saudi Arabia)
26 February 2019
19:00 UTC+7

Hà Nội (Vietnam)	10–0	(Cambodia) Nagaworld
Đỗ Duy Mạnh 6'; Oseni 13', 68', 75', 81'; Makara 18' (o.g.); Nguyễn Văn Quyết 44' (pen.); Đỗ Hùng Dũng 48'; Nguyễn Văn Dũng 72'; Ngân Văn Đại 88'	Live Report; Stats Report

Hàng Đẫy Stadium, Hanoi
Attendance: 5,000
Referee: Shaun Evans (Australia)

12 March 2019
18:30 UTC+7

Nagaworld (Cambodia)	2–1	(Myanmar) Yangon United
Kipson 6' (pen.), 26' (pen.)	Live Report; Stats Report	Miller 9'

Phnom Penh Olympic Stadium, Phnom Penh
Attendance: 352
Referee: Baraa Aisha (Palestine)
12 March 2019
19:30 UTC+8

Tampines Rovers (Singapore)	1–1	(Vietnam) Hà Nội
Webb 77'	Live Report; Stats Report	Faye 62'

Jalan Besar Stadium, Singapore
Attendance: 1,671
Referee: Omar Mohamed Al-Ali (United Arab Emirates)

2 April 2019
17:00 UTC+7

Nagaworld (Cambodia)	1–5	(Singapore) Tampines Rovers
Kouch 24'	Live Report; Stats Report	Webb 45', 66'; Mehmedović 57'; Delimeđac 90+1'; Megumi 90+3'

Phnom Penh Olympic Stadium, Phnom Penh
Attendance: 320
Referee: Ahmad Al-Ali (Kuwait)
2 April 2019
19:00 UTC+7

Hà Nội (Vietnam)	0–1	(Myanmar) Yangon United
	Live Report; Stats Report	Maung Maung Lwin 42'

Hàng Đẫy Stadium, Hanoi
Attendance: 3,921
Referee: Shen Yinhao (China)

17 April 2019
15:30 UTC+6:30

Yangon United (Myanmar)	2–5	(Vietnam) Hà Nội
Sylla 13'; Miller 26'	Live Report; Stats Report	Faye 3', 81', 83'; Oseni 33', 45+3'

Thuwunna Stadium, Yangon
Attendance: 524
Referee: Ammar Mahfoodh (Bahrain)
17 April 2019
19:30 UTC+8

Tampines Rovers (Singapore)	4–2	(Cambodia) Nagaworld
Irwan 3'; Yasir 87'; Khairul 90+1'; Webb 90+7'	Live Report; Stats Report	Kouch 14'; Omogba 90'

Jalan Besar Stadium, Singapore
Attendance: 1,283
Referee: Yusuke Araki (Japan)

1 May 2019
17:00 UTC+7

Nagaworld (Cambodia)	1–5	(Vietnam) Hà Nội
Sovannara 63'	Live Report; Stats Report	Faye 35'; Oseni 42', 90+1'; Trần Văn Kiên 70'; Hoàng Vũ Samson 86'

Phnom Penh Olympic Stadium, Phnom Penh
Attendance: 396
Referee: Mahmood Al-Majarafi (Oman)
1 May 2019
19:30 UTC+8

Tampines Rovers (Singapore)	4–3	(Myanmar) Yangon United
Khairul 2', 43', 77'; Irwan 90+1'	Live Report; Stats Report	Soe Min Naing 58'; Maung Maung Lwin 71'; Kyaw Zin Oo 85'

Jalan Besar Stadium, Singapore
Attendance: 1,827
Referee: Kim Dae-yong (South Korea)

15 May 2019
17:00 UTC+7

Hà Nội (Vietnam)	2–0	(Singapore) Tampines Rovers
Oseni 10'; Nguyễn Thành Chung 31'	Live Report; Stats Report

Hàng Đẫy Stadium, Hanoi
Attendance: 3,678
Referee: Ali Shaban (Kuwait)
15 May 2019
16:30 UTC+6:30

Yangon United (Myanmar)	2–0	(Cambodia) Nagaworld
Maung Maung Lwin 75'; Miller 90+6' (pen.)	Live Report; Stats Report

Thuwunna Stadium, Yangon
Attendance: 241
Referee: Yoshimi Yamashita (Japan)

=== Group G ===
Pos	Team	Pld	W	D	L	GF	GA	GD	Pts	Qualification	CER	BBD	PSJ	SHA
1	(Philippines) Ceres–Negros	6	5	0	1	15	6	+9	15	Zonal semi-finals	—	0–1	1–0	3–2
2	(Vietnam) Becamex Bình Dương	6	4	1	1	13	5	+8	13	Zonal semi-finals	1–3	—	3–1	6–0
3	(Indonesia) Persija Jakarta	6	2	1	3	12	9	+3	7		2–3	0–0	—	6–1
4	(Myanmar) Shan United	6	0	0	6	5	25	−20	0		0–5	1–2	1–3	—

Source: AFC
Rules for classification: Group stage tiebreakers
26 February 2019
15:30 UTC+7

Persija Jakarta (Indonesia)	0–0	(Vietnam) Becamex Bình Dương
	Live Report; Stats Report

Gelora Bung Karno Stadium, Jakarta
Attendance: 35,282
Referee: Mongkolchai Pechsri (Thailand)
26 February 2019
19:30 UTC+8

Ceres–Negros (Philippines)	3–2	(Myanmar) Shan United
Porteria 19', 87'; Marañón 37' (pen.)	Live Report; Stats Report	Zin Min Tun 50'; Dway Ko Ko Chit 88'

Panaad Stadium, Bacolod
Attendance: 5,748
Referee: Yaqoub Al-Hammadi (United Arab Emirates)

12 March 2019
15:30 UTC+6:30

Shan United (Myanmar)	1–3	(Indonesia) Persija Jakarta
Nakamura 14'	Live Report; Stats Report	Matos 66', 83'; Paulle 77'

Thuwunna Stadium, Yangon
Attendance: 512
Referee: Sultan Al-Marzooqi (United Arab Emirates)
12 March 2019
18:00 UTC+7

Becamex Bình Dương (Vietnam)	1–3	(Philippines) Ceres–Negros
Luiz 72'	Live Report; Stats Report	Marañón 26', 74', 78'

Gò Đậu Stadium, Thủ Dầu Một
Attendance: 3,300
Referee: Yusuke Araki (Japan)

3 April 2019
15:30 UTC+6:30

Shan United (Myanmar)	1–2	(Vietnam) Becamex Bình Dương
Hedipo 69'	Live Report; Stats Report	Tô Văn Vũ 49'; Luiz 85'

Thuwunna Stadium, Yangon
Attendance: 545
Referee: Choe Kwang-hyon (North Korea)
3 April 2019
19:30 UTC+8

Ceres–Negros (Philippines)	1–0	(Indonesia) Persija Jakarta
Marañón 9'	Live Report; Stats Report

Panaad Stadium, Bacolod
Attendance: 5,878
Referee: Vahid Kazemi (Iran)

16 April 2019
17:00 UTC+7

Becamex Bình Dương (Vietnam)	6–0	(Myanmar) Shan United
Nguyễn Anh Đức 5'; Tô Văn Vũ 25'; Mansaray 46', 61', 64'; Rabo 89'	Live Report; Stats Report

Gò Đậu Stadium, Thủ Dầu Một
Attendance: 2,548
Referee: Mohammad Arafah (Jordan)
23 April 2019 (Note: The Persija Jakarta v Ceres–Negros match was rescheduled from the original date of 16 April to 23 April due to its proximity to the general election held in Indonesia the next day.)
15:30 UTC+7

Persija Jakarta (Indonesia)	2–3	(Philippines) Ceres–Negros
Sandi 49'; Matos 57'	Live Report; Stats Report	Tanton 70'; Marañón 85'; Ott 90+2'

Gelora Bung Karno Stadium, Jakarta
Attendance: 26,923
Referee: Sherzod Kasimov (Uzbekistan)

1 May 2019
15:30 UTC+6:30

Shan United (Myanmar)	0–5	(Philippines) Ceres–Negros
	Live Report; Stats Report	Marañón 38', 43' (pen.), 71'; De Murga 80'; Porteria 85'

Thuwunna Stadium, Yangon
Attendance: 420
Referee: Liu Kwok Man (Hong Kong)
1 May 2019
17:00 UTC+7

Becamex Bình Dương (Vietnam)	3–1	(Indonesia) Persija Jakarta
Nguyễn Anh Đức 38'; Tô Văn Vũ 45+2'; Luiz 51'	Live Report; Stats Report	Matos 71'

Gò Đậu Stadium, Thủ Dầu Một
Attendance: 2,688
Referee: Minoru Tōjō (Japan)

15 May 2019
20:00 UTC+8

Ceres–Negros (Philippines)	0–1	(Vietnam) Becamex Bình Dương
	Live Report; Stats Report	Luiz 88'

Panaad Stadium, Bacolod
Attendance: 5,347
Referee: Kim Dae-yong (South Korea)
15 May 2019
20:30 UTC+7

Persija Jakarta (Indonesia)	6–1	(Myanmar) Shan United
Matos 6', 90', 90+2'; Novri 18'; Heri 47'; Riko 57'	Live Report; Stats Report	Zin Min Tun 81'

Gelora Bung Karno Stadium, Jakarta
Attendance: 8,633
Referee: Nivon Robesh Gamini (Sri Lanka)

=== Group H ===
Pos	Team	Pld	W	D	L	GF	GA	GD	Pts	Qualification	PSM	HOM	KAY	LAO
1	(Indonesia) PSM Makassar	6	4	2	0	17	8	+9	14	Zonal semi-finals	—	3–2	1–1	7–3
2	(Singapore) Home United	6	3	1	2	9	11	−2	10		1–1	—	2–0	1–0
3	(Philippines) Kaya–Iloilo	6	2	2	2	13	7	+6	8		1–2	5–0	—	5–1
4	(Laos) Lao Toyota	6	0	1	5	7	20	−13	1		0–3	2–3	1–1	—

Source: AFC
Rules for classification: Group stage tiebreakers
27 February 2019
19:30 UTC+8

Home United (Singapore)	1–1	(Indonesia) PSM Makassar
Syahin 63'	Live Report; Stats Report	Markkanen 26'

Jalan Besar Stadium, Singapore
Attendance: 1,589
Referee: Ammar Mahfoodh (Bahrain)
27 February 2019
18:30 UTC+7

Lao Toyota (Laos)	1–1	(Philippines) Kaya–Iloilo
Aphideth 87'	Live Report; Stats Report	Bedic 18'

New Laos National Stadium, Vientiane
Attendance: 1,200
Referee: Kim Woo-sung (South Korea)

13 March 2019
15:00 UTC+8

Kaya–Iloilo (Philippines)	5–0	(Singapore) Home United
Roberts 2', 37'; Bedic 33'; Osei 49', 55'	Live Report; Stats Report

Panaad Stadium, Bacolod
Attendance: 527
Referee: Rowan Arumughan (India)
13 March 2019
15:00 UTC+7

PSM Makassar (Indonesia)	7–3	(Laos) Lao Toyota
Pluim 12', 59'; Zulham 21'; Markkanen 61', 70'; Ferdinand 80'; Klok 85'	Live Report; Stats Report	Honma 14', 90'; Rafael 76'

Pakansari Stadium, Cibinong (Note: PSM Makassar played their home matches at Pakansari Stadium, Cibinong, instead of their home Andi Mattalata Stadium, Makassar, since the stadium did not meet AFC regulations.)
Attendance: 626
Referee: Takuto Okabe (Japan)

2 April 2019
15:00 UTC+7

PSM Makassar (Indonesia)	1–1	(Philippines) Kaya–Iloilo
Markkanen 56' (pen.)	Live Report; Stats Report	Angeles 90+3'

Pakansari Stadium, Cibinong
Attendance: 723
Referee: Feras Taweel (Syria)
2 April 2019
19:30 UTC+8

Home United (Singapore)	1–0	(Laos) Lao Toyota
Abdil 45+2'	Live Report; Stats Report

Jalan Besar Stadium, Singapore
Attendance: 1,247
Referee: Yu Ming-hsun (Chinese Taipei)

17 April 2019
15:00 UTC+8

Kaya–Iloilo (Philippines)	1–2	(Indonesia) PSM Makassar
Bedic 90+1' (pen.)	Live Report; Stats Report	Rizky 21'; Markkanen 24'

Panaad Stadium, Bacolod
Attendance: 743
Referee: Mongkolchai Pechsri (Thailand)
17 April 2019
18:30 UTC+7

Lao Toyota (Laos)	2–3	(Singapore) Home United
Rafael 11'; Honma 75' (pen.)	Live Report; Stats Report	Song Ui-young 15', 40' (pen.); Hafiz 89'

New Laos National Stadium, Vientiane
Attendance: 327
Referee: Hasan Akrami (Iran)

30 April 2019
15:00 UTC+8

Kaya–Iloilo (Philippines)	5–1	(Laos) Lao Toyota
Mintah 11', 66', 89'; Tacagni 40'; Tuason 86'	Live Report; Stats Report	Honma 70'

Panaad Stadium, Bacolod
Attendance: 397
Referee: Nivon Robesh Gamini (Sri Lanka)
30 April 2019
15:00 UTC+7

PSM Makassar (Indonesia)	3–2	(Singapore) Home United
Klok 60' (pen.), 78'; Guy Junior 86'	Live Report; Stats Report	Hafiz 51', 55'

Pakansari Stadium, Cibinong
Attendance: 517
Referee: Kim Hee-gon (South Korea)

14 May 2019
20:30 UTC+8

Home United (Singapore)	2–0	(Philippines) Kaya–Iloilo
Adam 1'; Abdil 18'	Live Report; Stats Report

Jalan Besar Stadium, Singapore
Attendance: 963
Referee: Bijan Heidari (Iran)
14 May 2019
19:30 UTC+7

Lao Toyota (Laos)	0–3	(Indonesia) PSM Makassar
	Live Report; Stats Report	Rasyid 43'; Saldi 74'; Guy Junior 86'

New Laos National Stadium, Vientiane
Attendance: 230
Referee: Dmitriy Mashentsev (Kyrgyzstan)

=== Group I ===
Pos	Team	Pld	W	D	L	GF	GA	GD	Pts	Qualification	APR	KIT	TAI	HYU
1	(North Korea) April 25	6	5	0	1	17	2	+15	15	Inter-zone play-off semi-finals	—	2–0	4–0	5–0
2	(Hong Kong) Kitchee	6	3	1	2	11	10	+1	10		1–0	—	2–4	3–0
3	(Hong Kong) Tai Po	6	2	2	2	13	15	−2	8		1–3	3–3	—	4–2
4	(Chinese Taipei) Hang Yuen	6	0	1	5	4	18	−14	1		0–3	1–2	1–1	—

Source: AFC
Rules for classification: Group stage tiebreakers
3 April 2019
19:00 UTC+8

Hang Yuen (Chinese Taipei)	0–3	(North Korea) April 25
	Live Report; Stats Report	O Hyok-chol 33'; Son Phyong-il 45+1'; Kim Yu-song 90+2'

Hsinchu County Second Stadium, Zhubei
Attendance: 250
Referee: Hussein Abo Yehia (Lebanon)
3 April 2019
20:00 UTC+8

Kitchee (Hong Kong)	2–4	(Hong Kong) Tai Po
Fernando 63'; Dani Cancela 86'	Live Report; Stats Report	João Emir 31'; Sartori 50'; Chung Wai Keung 88'; Sawyer 90+4'

Mong Kok Stadium, Hong Kong
Attendance: 2,481
Referee: Suhaizi Shukri (Malaysia)

17 April 2019
17:00 UTC+9

April 25 (North Korea)	2–0	(Hong Kong) Kitchee
Ri Hyong-jin 53'; Kim Yu-song 57'	Live Report; Stats Report

Kim Il-sung Stadium, Pyongyang
Attendance: 3,800
Referee: Sadullo Gulmurodi (Tajikistan)
17 April 2019
20:00 UTC+8

Tai Po (Hong Kong)	4–2	(Chinese Taipei) Hang Yuen
Chak Ting Fung 17'; Sartori 34', 55'; Chan Siu Kwan 90'	Live Report; Stats Report	Estama 33'; Joo Ik-seong 67'

Mong Kok Stadium, Hong Kong
Attendance: 3,533
Referee: Tejas Nagvenkar (India)

30 April 2019
20:00 UTC+8

Tai Po (Hong Kong)	1–3	(North Korea) April 25
Sawyer 54'	Live Report; Stats Report	Kim Yu-song 3', 72'; Son Phyong-il 43'

Mong Kok Stadium, Hong Kong
Attendance: 4,341
Referee: Clifford Daypuyat (Philippines)
1 May 2019
20:00 UTC+8

Kitchee (Hong Kong)	3–0	(Chinese Taipei) Hang Yuen
Tarrés 9'; Cheng Chin Lung 85'; Fernando 90'	Live Report; Stats Report

Mong Kok Stadium, Hong Kong
Attendance: 1,797
Referee: Chae Sang-hyeop (South Korea)

15 May 2019
17:00 UTC+9

April 25 (North Korea)	4–0	(Hong Kong) Tai Po
Kim Yu-song 3', 68'; Won Song 20'; Rim Chol-min 40' (pen.)	Live Report; Stats Report

Kim Il-sung Stadium, Pyongyang
Attendance: 3,800
Referee: Timur Faizullin (Kyrgyzstan)
15 May 2019
19:00 UTC+8

Hang Yuen (Chinese Taipei)	1–2	(Hong Kong) Kitchee
Smith 62' (o.g.)	Live Report; Stats Report	Tarrés 40'; Fernando 69'

Taipei Municipal Stadium, Taipei
Attendance: 410
Referee: Takuto Okabe (Japan)

19 June 2019
17:00 UTC+9

April 25 (North Korea)	5–0	(Chinese Taipei) Hang Yuen
An Il-bom 19' (pen.); O Hyok-chol 57' (pen.); Rim Chol-min 77'; Jang Hyok 83', 90+2'	Live Report; Stats Report

Kim Il-sung Stadium, Pyongyang
Attendance: 3,100
Referee: Pranjal Banerjee (India)
19 June 2019
20:00 UTC+8

Tai Po (Hong Kong)	3–3	(Hong Kong) Kitchee
Dani Cancela 30' (o.g.); Sandro 56'; Chiu Siu Wai 90+4'	Live Report; Stats Report	Fernando 6', 48'; Cheng Chin Lung 34'

Mong Kok Stadium, Hong Kong
Attendance: 2,688
Referee: Bijan Heidari (Iran)

26 June 2019
20:00 UTC+8

Kitchee (Hong Kong)	1–0	(North Korea) April 25
Fernando 39'	Live Report; Stats Report

Mong Kok Stadium, Hong Kong
Attendance: 1,242
Referee: Hanna Hattab (Syria)
26 June 2019
20:00 UTC+8

Hang Yuen (Chinese Taipei)	1–1	(Hong Kong) Tai Po
Joo Ik-seong 65'	Live Report; Stats Report	Chan Siu Kwan 24'

Taipei Municipal Stadium, Taipei
Attendance: 386
Referee: Mohammed Al-Hoish (Saudi Arabia)

== Ranking of second-placed teams ==
=== West Asia Zone ===
Pos	Grp	Team	Pld	W	D	L	GF	GA	GD	Pts	Qualification
1	A	(Syria) Al-Jaish	6	2	4	0	6	4	+2	10 (Note: Disciplinary points: Al-Jaish −6, Al-Kuwait −11.)	Zonal semi-finals
2	B	Al-Kuwait	6	3	1	2	6	4	+2	10	
3	C	(Bahrain) Malkiya	6	2	2	2	8	8	0	8	

Source: AFC

=== ASEAN Zone ===
Pos	Grp	Team	Pld	W	D	L	GF	GA	GD	Pts	Qualification
1	G	(Vietnam) Becamex Bình Dương	6	4	1	1	13	5	+8	13	Zonal semi-finals
2	F	(Singapore) Tampines Rovers	6	4	1	1	17	10	+7	13	
3	H	(Singapore) Home United	6	3	1	2	9	11	−2	10	

Source: AFC
