= Nguyễn Văn Quyết =

Vietnamese footballer

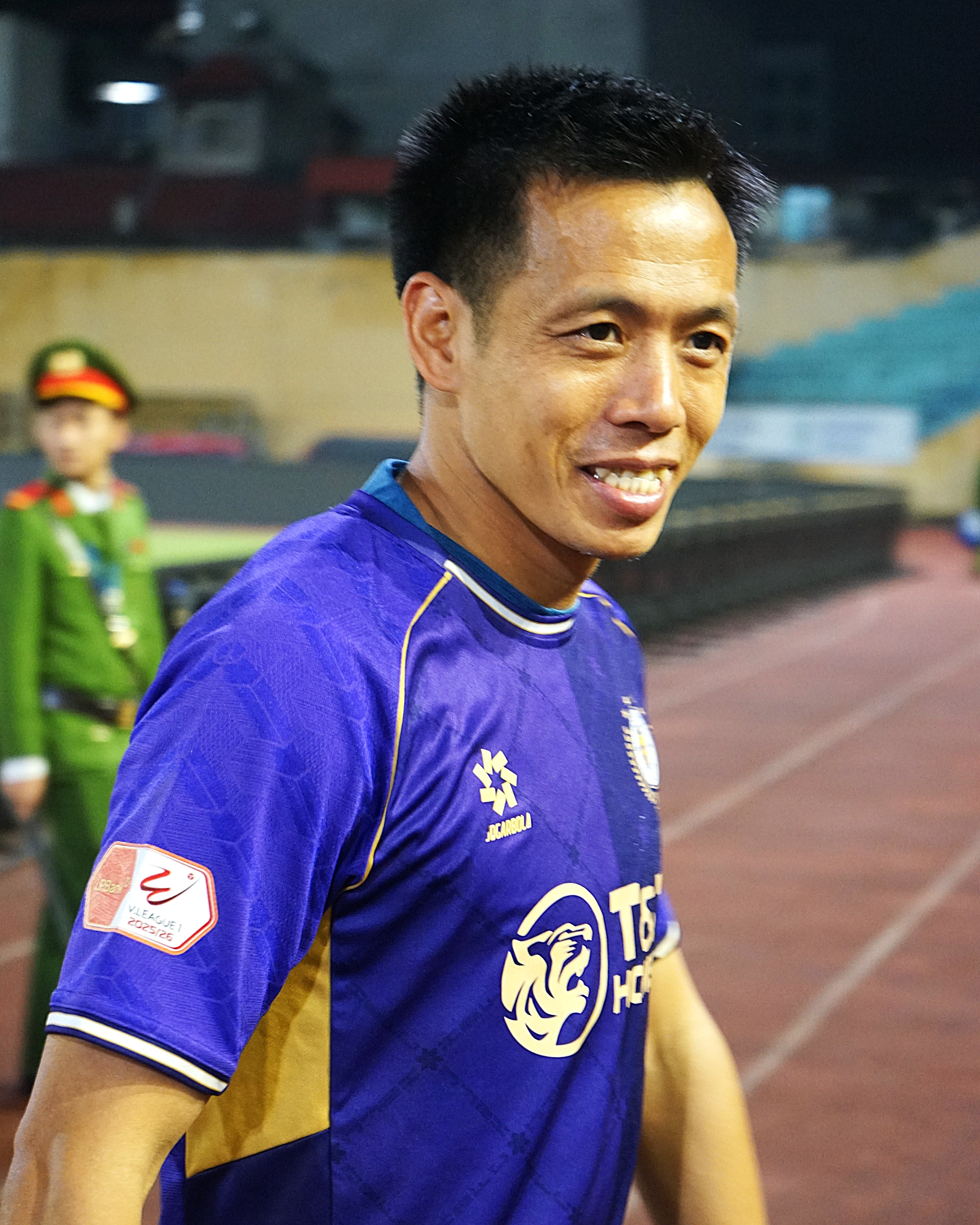
- Văn Quyết in 2026

Personal information
- Full name: Nguyễn Văn Quyết
- Date of birth: 1 July 1991 (age 35)
- Place of birth: Thạch Thất, Hanoi, Vietnam
- Height: 1.72 m (5 ft 8 in)
- Positions: Winger; attacking midfielder

Team information
- Current team: Hà Nội
- Number: 10

Youth career
- 2006–2008: Viettel

Senior career*
| Years | Team | Apps | (Gls) |
| 2008–2010 | Viettel | 37 | (11) |
| 2010– | Hà Nội | 338 | (126) |

International career^{‡}
| 2009–2010 | Vietnam U19 | 21 | (5) |
| 2011–2013 | Vietnam U23 | 11 | (10) |
| 2018 | Vietnam Olympic (O.P.) | 8 | (1) |
| 2011–2024 | Vietnam | 58 | (16) |
Medal record
Men's football
Representing Vietnam
AFF Championship
| Winner | ASEAN 2018 | Team |
| Runner-up | ASEAN 2022 | Team |
- * Club domestic league appearances and goals as of 21 November 2026 ‡ National team caps and goals as of 8 April 2024

Nguyễn Văn Quyết (born 1 July 1991) is a Vietnamese professional footballer who plays as a winger or attacking midfielder for V.League 1 club Hà Nội.

Nguyễn Văn Quyết started his career with Viettel before moving to Hà Nội in 2011, where he established himself as one of the best player in the V.League 1. He won thirteen trophies with Hà Nội, including five V.League 1 titles, three National Cups and five Super Cups.

A youth international for Vietnam from under-19 to under-23 level, Văn Quyết made his senior debut in 2011. He has represented his nation at five editions of the AFF Championship, as well as the 2018 Asian Games. He retired from international football in 2024.

== Club career ==
=== Viettel ===
Nguyễn Văn Quyết is a product of the Thể Công youth academy. As team captain, he helped Thể Công's first team Viettel promoting from the Third Division to the First Division in two seasons. After the outstanding performances for Viettel and Vietnam youth national teams, he was named as the 2010 Vietnamese Young Player of the Year.

=== Hà Nội ===
Ahead of the 2011 season, Văn Quyết was transferred to V-League club Hà Nội T&T.

In the 2012 season, Văn Quyết won the V-League Player of the Month award in January.

Văn Quyết won his first V.League 1 title with Hà Nội T&T in the 2013 season. In 2015, Văn Quyết was named captain of Hà Nội T&T.

In 2018 V.League 1 and 2020, Văn Quyết was given the V.League 1 Player of the Season award. On 12 January 2021, Văn Quyết won the Vietnamese Golden Ball for the first time.

After winning his fifth V.League 1 title in 2022 with Hà Nội, Văn Quyết became the player that won the most V.League 1 alongside Phạm Thành Lương.

== International career ==
Văn Quyết represented Vietnam at youth level between 2009 and 2013, progressing from the under-19 team up to the under-23 team. His debut for the senior national team came on 29 June 2011, against Macau where he came on as a substitute and scored a goal in a 6–0 home win in 2014 FIFA World Cup qualification.

After Lê Công Vinh's retirement in 2017, Văn Quyết became the new captain of Vietnam national team.

In 2018, Văn Quyết captained Vietnam Olympic at the 2018 Asian Games, where Vietnam finished fourth. He was then part of the Vietnam squad that won the 2018 AFF Championship, the country's first title after 10 years. However, he was dropped from the final squad for the 2019 AFC Asian Cup.

On 12 October 2024, Văn Quyết announced that he had retired from international football after the match against India. He earned 58 caps, scoring 16 goals.

== Personal life ==
In 2015, Văn Quyết married Nguyễn Huyền Mi, eldest daughter of former Sài Gòn FC president Nguyễn Giang Đông. The couple has a son and a daughter.

== Career statistics ==
=== Club ===
As of match played 21 November 2026

Appearances and goals by club, season and competition
| Club | Season | League | | | National cup | | Continental | | Other | | Total | |
| Club | Season | Division | Apps | Goals | Apps | Goals | Apps | Goals | Apps | Goals | Apps | Goals |
|---|---|---|---|---|---|---|---|---|---|---|---|---|
| Viettel | 2008 | Third Division | 4 | 1 | — | | — | | 1 (Note: Appearances in Third Division final stage) | 0 | 5 | 1 |
| Viettel | 2009 | Second Division | 10 | 2 | — | | — | | 2 (Note: Appearances in Second Division final stage) | 0 | 12 | 2 |
| Viettel | 2010 | First Division | 23 | 8 | 2 | 0 | — | | — | | 25 | 8 |
| Viettel | Total | | 37 | 11 | 2 | 0 | 0 | 0 | 3 | 0 | 42 | 11 |
| Hà Nội | 2011 | V.League 1 | 25 | 9 | 1 | 0 | 5 (Note: Appearances in AFC Cup) | 1 | 1 (Note: Appearance in Vietnamese Super Cup) | 0 | 32 | 10 |
| Hà Nội | 2012 | V.League 1 | 24 | 12 | 4 | 1 | — | | — | | 28 | 13 |
| Hà Nội | 2013 | V.League 1 | 22 | 7 | 0 | 0 | — | | — | | 22 | 7 |
| Hà Nội | 2014 | V.League 1 | 22 | 11 | 1 | 0 | 10 (Note: Two appearances and one goal in AFC Champions League, eight appearances and six goals in AFC Cup) | 7 | 1 | 0 | 34 | 18 |
| Hà Nội | 2015 | V.League 1 | 25 | 13 | 4 | 3 | 2 (Note: Appearances in AFC Champions League) | 0 | — | | 31 | 16 |
| Hà Nội | 2016 | V.League 1 | 19 | 5 | 7 | 6 | 1 | 0 | 1 | 0 | 28 | 11 |
| Hà Nội | 2017 | V.League 1 | 24 | 9 | 1 | 0 | 7 (Note: One appearance in AFC Champions League, six appearances and five goals in AFC Cup) | 5 | 1 | 1 | 33 | 15 |
| Hà Nội | 2018 | V.League 1 | 19 | 7 | 6 | 0 | — | | — | | 25 | 7 |
| Hà Nội | 2019 | V.League 1 | 15 | 9 | 4 | 4 | 13 (Note: Two appearances and two goals in AFC Champions League, elenven appearances and seven goals in AFC Cup) | 9 | 1 | 0 | 33 | 22 |
| Hà Nội | 2020 | V.League 1 | 20 | 5 | 3 | 5 | — | | 1 | 0 | 24 | 10 |
| Hà Nội | 2021 | V.League 1 | 10 | 1 | 0 | 0 | — | | 1 | 0 | 11 | 1 |
| Hà Nội | 2022 | V.League 1 | 18 | 6 | 3 | 3 | — | | — | | 21 | 9 |
| Hà Nội | 2023 | V.League 1 | 13 | 9 | 0 | 0 | — | | 1 | 0 | 14 | 9 |
| Hà Nội | 2023–24 | V.League 1 | 25 | 11 | 4 | 1 | 5 | 0 | — | | 34 | 12 |
| Hà Nội | 2024–25 | V.League 1 | 25 | 7 | 1 | 0 | — | | — | | 26 | 7 |
| Hà Nội | 2025–26 | V.League 1 | 24 | 4 | 1 | 0 | — | | — | | 25 | 4 |
| Hà Nội | 2026–27 | V.League 1 | 8 | 1 | 1 | 0 | — | | — | | 9 | 1 |
| Hà Nội | Total | | 338 | 126 | 42 | 23 | 43 | 22 | 8 | 1 | 430 | 172 |
| Total career | | | 376 | 137 | 44 | 23 | 43 | 22 | 11 | 1 | 472 | 183 |

=== International ===
As of match played 12 October 2024

Appearances and goals by national team and year
| National team | Year | Apps | Goals |
|---|---|---|---|
| Vietnam | 2011 | 5 | 1 |
| Vietnam | 2012 | 9 | 2 |
| Vietnam | 2013 | 2 | 0 |
| Vietnam | 2014 | 10 | 4 |
| Vietnam | 2015 | 4 | 0 |
| Vietnam | 2016 | 10 | 4 |
| Vietnam | 2017 | 5 | 2 |
| Vietnam | 2018 | 4 | 0 |
| Vietnam | 2022 | 5 | 3 |
| Vietnam | 2023 | 3 | 0 |
| Vietnam | 2024 | 1 | 0 |
| Total | | 58 | 16 |

=== International goals ===
Scores and results list Vietnam's goal tally first, score column indicates score after each Quyết goal.

List of international goals scored by Nguyễn Văn Quyết
| No. | Date | Venue | Cap | Opponent | Score | Result | Competition |
|---|---|---|---|---|---|---|---|
| 1 | 29 June 2011 | Thống Nhất Stadium, Ho Chi Minh City, Vietnam | 1 | Macau | 6–0 | 6–0 | 2014 FIFA World Cup qualification |
| 2 | 10 June 2012 | Mong Kok Stadium, Mong Kok, Hong Kong | 7 | Hong Kong | 1–1 | 2–1 | Friendly |
| 3 | 30 November 2012 | Rajamangala Stadium, Bangkok, Thailand | 14 | Thailand | 1–2 | 1–3 | 2012 AFF Championship |
| 4 | 2 July 2014 | Gò Đậu Stadium, Thủ Dầu Một, Vietnam | 18 | Myanmar | 6–0 | 6–0 | Friendly |
| 5 | 9 November 2014 | Mỹ Đình National Stadium, Hanoi, Vietnam | 20 | Palestine | 1–3 | 1–3 | Friendly |
| 6 | 16 November 2014 | Mỹ Đình National Stadium, Hanoi, Vietnam | 21 | Malaysia | 2–1 | 3–1 | Friendly |
| 7 | 7 December 2014 | Shah Alam Stadium, Shah Alam, Malaysia | 25 | Malaysia | 2–1 | 2–1 | 2014 AFF Championship |
| 8 | 31 May 2016 | Mỹ Đình National Stadium, Hanoi, Vietnam | 31 | Syria | 2–0 | 2–0 | Friendly |
| 9 | 6 June 2016 | Thuwunna Stadium, Yangon, Myanmar | 33 | Singapore | 2–0 | 3–0 (a.e.t.) | 2016 AYA Bank Cup |
| 10 | 20 November 2016 | Thuwunna Stadium, Yangon, Myanmar | 37 | Myanmar | 1–0 | 2–1 | 2016 AFF Championship |
| 11 | 3 December 2016 | Pakansari Stadium, Bogor, Indonesia | 39 | Indonesia | 1–1 | 1–2 | 2016 AFF Championship |
| 12 | 5 September 2017 | Phnom Penh Olympic Stadium, Phnom Penh, Cambodia | 43 | Cambodia | 1–0 | 2–1 | 2019 AFC Asian Cup qualification |
| 13 | 10 October 2017 | Mỹ Đình National Stadium, Hanoi, Vietnam | 44 | Cambodia | 2–0 | 5–0 | 2019 AFC Asian Cup qualification |
| 14 | 21 September 2022 | Thống Nhất Stadium, Ho Chi Minh City, Vietnam | 52 | Singapore | 1–0 | 4–0 | 2022 VFF Tri-Nations Series |
| 15 | 27 September 2022 | Thống Nhất Stadium, Ho Chi Minh City, Vietnam | 53 | India | 3–0 | 3–0 | 2022 VFF Tri-Nations Series |
| 16 | 14 December 2022 | Hàng Đẫy Stadium, Hanoi, Vietnam | 54 | Philippines | 1–0 | 1–0 | Friendly |

Hanoi FC

| # | Date | Venue | Opponent | Score | Result | Competition |
|---|---|---|---|---|---|---|
| 1. | 12 April 2011 | Hanoi, Hàng Đẫy Stadium | (Singapore) Tampines Rovers | 1-0 | 1-1 | 2011 AFC Cup |
| 2. | 29 January 2014 | Pune, Shree Shiv Chhatrapati Sports Complex | (India) Pune | 2-0 | 2-0 | 2014 AFC Champions League qualifying play-off |
| 3. | 25 February 2014 | Hanoi, Hàng Đẫy Stadium | (Maldives) Maziya | 1-1 | 5-1 | 2014 AFC Cup |
| 4. | 25 February 2014 | Hanoi, Hàng Đẫy Stadium | (Maldives) Maziya | 2-1 | 5-1 | 2014 AFC Cup |
| 5. | 25 February 2014 | Hanoi, Hàng Đẫy Stadium | (Maldives) Maziya | 4-1 | 5-1 | 2014 AFC Cup |
| 6. | 11 March 2014 | Malang, Kanjuruhan Stadium | (Indonesia) ARE | 3-1 | 3-1 | 2014 AFC Cup |
| 7. | 19 March 2014 | Hanoi, Hàng Đẫy Stadium | (Malaysia) Selangor | 1-0 | 1-0 | 2014 AFC Cup |
| 8. | 9 April 2014 | Malé, Galolhu National Stadium | (Maldives) Maziya | 2-0 | 2-0 | 2014 AFC Cup |
| 9. | 21 February 2017 | Hanoi, Mỹ Đình National Stadium | (Philippines) Ceres–Negros | 1-1 | 1-1 | 2017 AFC Cup |
| 10. | 15 March 2017 | Hanoi, Mỹ Đình National Stadium | (Singapore) Tampines Rovers | 2-0 | 4-0 | 2017 AFC Cup |
| 11. | 4 April 2017 | Singapore, Jalan Besar Stadium | (Singapore) Tampines Rovers | 1-1 | 2-1 | 2017 AFC Cup |
| 12. | 3 May 2017 | Hanoi, Mỹ Đình National Stadium | (Malaysia) Felda United | 2-0 | 4-1 | 2017 AFC Cup |
| 13. | 3 May 2017 | Hanoi, Mỹ Đình National Stadium | (Malaysia) Felda United | 3-0 | 4-1 | 2017 AFC Cup |
| 14. | 12 February 2019 | Pathum Thani, Thailand | (Thailand) Bangkok United | 1-0 | 1-0 | 2019 AFC Champions League qualifying play-offs |
| 15. | 19 February 2019 | Jinan, Shandong, China | (China) Shandong Luneng | 1-0 | 1-4 | 2019 AFC Champions League qualifying play-offs |
| 16. | 26 February 2019 | Hanoi, Vietnam | (Cambodia) Nagaworld FC | 4-0 | 10-0 | 2019 AFC Cup |
| 17. | 25 June 2019 | Hanoi, Vietnam | (Philippines) Ceres–Negros | 2-0 | 2-1 | 2019 AFC Cup |
| 18. | 31 July 2019 | Binh Duong, Vietnam | (Vietnam) Becamex Bình Dương | 1-0 | 1-0 | 2019 AFC Cup |
| 19. | 20 August 2019 | Hanoi, Vietnam | (Turkmenistan) Altyn Asyr | 3-2 | 3-2 | 2019 AFC Cup |
| 20. | 27 August 2019 | Ashgabat, Turkmenistan | (Turkmenistan) Altyn Asyr | 1-0 | 2-2 | 2019 AFC Cup |
| 21. | 27 August 2019 | Ashgabat, Turkmenistan | (Turkmenistan) Altyn Asyr | 2-1 | 2-2 | 2019 AFC Cup |
| 22. | 25 September 2019 | Hanoi, Vietnam | (North Korea) April 25 | 1-1 | 2-2 | 2019 AFC Cup |

U-23/Olympic

| # | Date | Venue | Opponent | Score | Result | Competition |
|---|---|---|---|---|---|---|
| 1. | 3 November 2011 | Jakarta, Gelora Bung Karno Stadium | Philippines | 3–1 | 3-1 | 2011 Southeast Asian Games |
| 2. | 12 November 2011 | Jakarta, Lebak Bulus Stadium | Brunei | 1-0 | 8–0 | 2011 Southeast Asian Games |
| 3. | 12 November 2011 | Jakarta, Lebak Bulus Stadium | Brunei | 2-0 | 8–0 | 2011 Southeast Asian Games |
| 4. | 12 November 2011 | Jakarta, Lebak Bulus Stadium | Brunei | 3-0 | 8–0 | 2011 Southeast Asian Games |
| 5. | 17 November 2011 | Jakarta, Lebak Bulus Stadium | Laos | 2–1 | 3–1 | 2011 Southeast Asian Games |
| 6. | 25 June 2012 | Yangon, Thuwunna Stadium | Myanmar | 1–0 | 1–3 | 2013 AFC U-22 Championship qualification |
| 7. | 15 December 2013 | Naypyidaw, Zayarthiri Stadium | Laos | 2–0 | 5–0 | 2013 Southeast Asian Games |
| 8. | 15 December 2013 | Naypyidaw, Zayarthiri Stadium | Laos | 3–0 | 5–0 | 2013 Southeast Asian Games |
| 9. | 14 August 2018 | Cikarang, Indonesia | Pakistan | 2–0 | 3–0 | 2018 Asian Games |
| 10. | 1 September 2018 | Cibinong, Indonesia | United Arab Emirates | 1–1 | 1–1 (pens. 3–4) | 2018 Asian Games |

== Honours ==
Hà Nội

- V.League 1: 2013, 2016, 2018, 2019, 2022
- Vietnamese National Cup: 2019, 2020, 2022
- Vietnamese Super Cup: 2010, 2019, 2020, 2021, 2022

Vietnam

- AFF Championship: 2018; runner-up: 2022
- AYA Bank Cup: 2016
- VFF Cup: 2022

Vietnam U23/Olympic

- Asian Games Fourth place: 2018
- VFF Cup: 2018

Individual

- Vietnamese Young Player of the Year: 2010, 2011
- Vietnamese Silver Ball: 2014, 2015
- Vietnamese Golden Ball: 2020, 2022
- V.League 1 Player of the Season: 2018, 2020, 2022
- V.League 1 Team of the Season: 2014, 2015, 2018, 2019, 2020, 2022, 2023–24
- Top 10 outstanding Vietnamese athletes of the Year: 2020 (Top 1)

== Controversy ==
On 13 March 2016, in a match against Sanna Khánh Hòa, Quyết was sent off after pushing over the referee who had just made a controversial call.
