= 2019 AFC Champions League qualifying play-offs =

Football tournament in Asia

The 2019 AFC Champions League qualifying play-offs were played from 5 to 19 February 2019. A total of 27 teams competed in the qualifying play-offs to decide eight of the 32 places in the group stage of the 2019 AFC Champions League.

== Teams ==
The following 27 teams, split into two regions (West Region and East Region), entered the qualifying play-offs, consisting of three rounds:

- 6 teams entered in the preliminary round 1.
- 13 teams entered in the preliminary round 2.
- 8 teams entered in the play-off round.

Region	Teams entering in play-off round	Teams entering in preliminary round 2	Teams entering in preliminary round 1
West Region	(United Arab Emirates) Al-Nasr; (Saudi Arabia) Al-Nassr; (Qatar) Al-Rayyan; (Qatar) Al-Gharafa	(Iran) Zob Ahan; (Iran) Saipa; (Uzbekistan) AGMK; (Uzbekistan) Pakhtakor (Note: The identity of the second play-off team from Uzbekistan, and the play-off teams from South Korea, China, Japan and Indonesia was not known at the time of the group stage draw.); (Iraq) Al-Quwa Al-Jawiya; (Tajikistan) Istiklol; (India) Minerva Punjab	(Jordan) Al-Wehdat; Al-Kuwait
East Region	(South Korea) Ulsan Hyundai; (China) Shandong Luneng; (Japan) Sanfrecce Hiroshima; (Japan) Kashima Antlers	(Australia) Newcastle Jets; (Thailand) Chiangrai United; (Thailand) Bangkok United; (Malaysia) Perak; (Hong Kong) Kitchee; (Vietnam) Hanoi	(Philippines) Ceres–Negros; (Singapore) Home United; (Indonesia) Persija Jakarta; (Myanmar) Yangon United

== Format ==
In the qualifying play-offs, each tie was played as a single match. Extra time and penalty shoot-out were used to decide the winner if necessary (Regulations Article 9.2). The eight winners of the play-off round (four each from both West Region and East Region) advanced to the group stage to join the 24 direct entrants. All losers in each round from associations with only play-off slot entered the AFC Cup group stage.

== Schedule ==
The schedule of each round is as follows.

Round	Match date
Preliminary round 1	5 February 2019
Preliminary round 2	12 February 2019
Play-off round	19 February 2019

== Bracket ==
The bracket of the qualifying play-offs for each region, determined based on the association ranking of each team, with the team from the higher-ranked association hosting the match, was officially announced by the AFC prior to the group stage draw on 22 November 2018. Teams from the same association could not be placed into the same tie.

=== Play-off West 1 ===
- (Uzbekistan) Pakhtakor advanced to Group D.

Preliminary round 1	Preliminary round 2		Play-off round
			(United Arab Emirates) Al-Nasr	1
			(Uzbekistan) Pakhtakor	2
	(Uzbekistan) Pakhtakor	2
	(Iraq) Al-Quwa Al-Jawiya	1

=== Play-off West 2 ===
- (Saudi Arabia) Al-Nassr advanced to Group A.

Preliminary round 1	Preliminary round 2		Play-off round
			(Saudi Arabia) Al-Nassr	4
			(Uzbekistan) AGMK	0
	(Uzbekistan) AGMK	4
	(Tajikistan) Istiklol	2

=== Play-off West 3 ===
- (Qatar) Al-Rayyan advanced to Group B.

Preliminary round 1	Preliminary round 2		Play-off round
			(Qatar) Al-Rayyan	3
			(Iran) Saipa	1
	(Iran) Saipa	4
	(India) Minerva Punjab	0

=== Play-off West 4 ===
- (Iran) Zob Ahan advanced to Group A.

Preliminary round 1		Preliminary round 2		Play-off round
				(Qatar) Al-Gharafa	2
				(Iran) Zob Ahan	3
		(Iran) Zob Ahan (a.e.t.)	1
(Jordan) Al-Wehdat	2	Al-Kuwait	0
Al-Kuwait	3

=== Play-off East 1 ===
- (South Korea) Ulsan Hyundai advanced to Group H.

Preliminary round 1	Preliminary round 2		Play-off round
			(South Korea) Ulsan Hyundai	5
			(Malaysia) Perak	1
	(Malaysia) Perak (p)	1 (6)
	(Hong Kong) Kitchee	1 (5)

=== Play-off East 2 ===
- (China) Shandong Luneng advanced to Group E.

Preliminary round 1	Preliminary round 2		Play-off round
			(China) Shandong Luneng	4
			(Vietnam) Hanoi	1
	(Thailand) Bangkok United	0
	(Vietnam) Hanoi	1

=== Play-off East 3 ===
- (Japan) Sanfrecce Hiroshima advanced to Group F.

Preliminary round 1		Preliminary round 2		Play-off round
				(Japan) Sanfrecce Hiroshima (p)	0 (4)
				(Thailand) Chiangrai United	0 (3)
		(Thailand) Chiangrai United	3
(Philippines) Ceres–Negros	1	(Myanmar) Yangon United	1
(Myanmar) Yangon United	2

=== Play-off East 4 ===
- (Japan) Kashima Antlers advanced to Group E.

Preliminary round 1		Preliminary round 2		Play-off round
				(Japan) Kashima Antlers	4
				(Australia) Newcastle Jets	1
		(Australia) Newcastle Jets (a.e.t.)	3
(Singapore) Home United	1	(Indonesia) Persija Jakarta	1
(Indonesia) Persija Jakarta	3

== Preliminary round 1 ==
=== Summary ===
A total of six teams played in the preliminary round 1.

West Region
Team 1	Score	Team 2
Al-Wehdat (Jordan)	2–3	Al-Kuwait

East Region
Team 1	Score	Team 2
Ceres–Negros (Philippines)	1–2	(Myanmar) Yangon United
Home United (Singapore)	1–3	(Indonesia) Persija Jakarta

=== West Region ===
5 February 2019
19:00 UTC+2

Al-Wehdat (Jordan)	2–3	Al-Kuwait
Al-Dardour 10'; Murjan 31'	Live Report; Stats Report	Zayid 38', 44' (pen.); Saeed 68'

King Abdullah II Stadium, Amman
Attendance: 8,313
Referee: Kim Dae-yong (South Korea)

=== East Region ===
5 February 2019
19:30 UTC+8

Ceres–Negros (Philippines)	1–2	(Myanmar) Yangon United
Schröck 44'	Live Report; Stats Report	Miller 29'; Kaung Htet Soe 59'

Panaad Stadium, Bacolod
Attendance: 7,029
Referee: Masoud Tufayelieh (Syria)

5 February 2019
19:30 UTC+8

Home United (Singapore)	1–3	(Indonesia) Persija Jakarta
Song Ui-young 43'	Live Report; Stats Report	Ho Wai Loon 9' (o.g.); Beto 54'; Šimić 84'

Jalan Besar Stadium, Singapore
Attendance: 1,893
Referee: Yaqoob Abdul Baki (Oman)

== Preliminary round 2 ==
=== Summary ===
A total of 16 teams played in the preliminary round 2: 13 teams which entered in this round, and three winners of the preliminary round 1.

West Region
Team 1	Score	Team 2
Pakhtakor (Uzbekistan)	2–1	(Iraq) Al-Quwa Al-Jawiya
AGMK (Uzbekistan)	4–2	(Tajikistan) Istiklol
Saipa (Iran)	4–0	(India) Minerva Punjab
Zob Ahan (Iran)	1–0 (a.e.t.)	Al-Kuwait

East Region
Team 1	Score	Team 2
Perak (Malaysia)	1–1 (a.e.t.) (6–5 p)	(Hong Kong) Kitchee
Bangkok United (Thailand)	0–1	(Vietnam) Hanoi
Chiangrai United (Thailand)	3–1	(Myanmar) Yangon United
Newcastle Jets (Australia)	3–1 (a.e.t.)	(Indonesia) Persija Jakarta

=== West Region ===
12 February 2019
15:00 UTC+5

Pakhtakor (Uzbekistan)	2–1	(Iraq) Al-Quwa Al-Jawiya
Masharipov 77'; Bikmaev 84'	Live Report; Stats Report	Ahmad 87'

Pakhtakor Central Stadium, Tashkent
Attendance: 15,572
Referee: Kim Hee-gon (South Korea)

12 February 2019
16:00 UTC+5

AGMK (Uzbekistan)	4–2	(Tajikistan) Istiklol
Juraev 25'; Shikhov 72'; Khakimov 78'; Polvonov 82'	Live Report; Stats Report	Hasan 2'; Kimsanov 62'

AGMK Stadium, Olmaliq
Attendance: 7,920
Referee: Kim Dong-jin (South Korea)

12 February 2019
17:10 UTC+3:30

Saipa (Iran)	4–0	(India) Minerva Punjab
Rezavand 8' (pen.), 81'; Ramezani 24'; Sarfo 73'	Live Report; Stats Report

Shahr-e Qods Stadium, Qods
Attendance: 1,210
Referee: Yudai Yamamoto (Japan)

12 February 2019
19:00 UTC+3:30

Zob Ahan (Iran)	1–0 (a.e.t.)	Al-Kuwait
Osaguona 110'	Live Report; Stats Report

Foolad Shahr Stadium, Isfahan
Attendance: 3,600
Referee: Minoru Tōjō (Japan)

=== East Region ===
12 February 2019
21:00 UTC+8

Perak (Malaysia)	1–1 (a.e.t.)	(Hong Kong) Kitchee
Wander 14'	Live Report; Stats Report	Li Ngai Hoi 86'
Penalties
Wander (penalty scored); Amirul (penalty scored); Parthiban (penalty scored); Leandro (penalty missed); Gilmar (penalty scored); Shahrul (penalty scored); Kenny (penalty scored)	6–5	(penalty scored) Tarrés; (penalty scored) Silva; (penalty scored) Vadócz; (penalty scored) Hélio; (penalty missed) Li Ngai Hoi; (penalty scored) Tong Kin Man; (penalty missed) Cancela

Perak Stadium, Ipoh
Attendance: 8,605
Referee: Hanna Hattab (Syria)

12 February 2019
19:00 UTC+7

Bangkok United (Thailand)	0–1	(Vietnam) Hanoi
	Live Report; Stats Report	Nguyễn Văn Quyết 89' (pen.)

Thammasat Stadium, Pathum Thani
Attendance: 5,384
Referee: Mooud Bonyadifar (Iran)

12 February 2019
19:00 UTC+7

Chiangrai United (Thailand)	3–1	(Myanmar) Yangon United
Lee Yong-rae 12'; Suriya 38'; Bill 86'	Live Report; Stats Report	Pyae Phyo Zaw 36'

Singha Stadium, Chiang Rai
Attendance: 3,177
Referee: Jansen Foo (Singapore)

12 February 2019
19:00 UTC+11

Newcastle Jets (Australia)	3–1 (a.e.t.)	(Indonesia) Persija Jakarta
Vargas 49'; Boogaard 101'; Ridenton 120'	Live Report; Stats Report	Ramdani 72'

Newcastle International Sports Centre, Newcastle
Attendance: 6,647
Referee: Aziz Asimov (Uzbekistan)

== Play-off round ==
=== Summary ===
A total of 16 teams played in the play-off round: eight teams which entered in this round, and eight winners of the preliminary round 2.

West Region
Team 1	Score	Team 2
Al-Nasr (United Arab Emirates)	1–2	(Uzbekistan) Pakhtakor
Al-Nassr (Saudi Arabia)	4–0	(Uzbekistan) AGMK
Al-Rayyan (Qatar)	3–1	(Iran) Saipa
Al-Gharafa (Qatar)	2–3	(Iran) Zob Ahan

East Region
Team 1	Score	Team 2
Ulsan Hyundai (South Korea)	5–1	(Malaysia) Perak
Shandong Luneng (China)	4–1	(Vietnam) Hanoi
Sanfrecce Hiroshima (Japan)	0–0 (a.e.t.) (4–3 p)	(Thailand) Chiangrai United
Kashima Antlers (Japan)	4–1	(Australia) Newcastle Jets

=== West Region ===
19 February 2019
19:00 UTC+4

Al-Nasr (United Arab Emirates)	1–2	(Uzbekistan) Pakhtakor
Negredo 59' (pen.)	Live Report; Stats Report	Ćeran 31' (pen.); Bikmaev 50'

Al-Maktoum Stadium, Dubai
Attendance: 4,254
Referee: Ryuji Sato (Japan)

19 February 2019
18:00 UTC+3

Al-Nassr (Saudi Arabia)	4–0	(Uzbekistan) AGMK
Hawsawi 55'; Al-Ghanam 62'; Giuliano 80', 90+3'	Live Report; Stats Report

Prince Faisal bin Fahd Stadium, Riyadh
Attendance: 6,915
Referee: Muhammad Taqi (Singapore)

19 February 2019
18:00 UTC+3

Al-Rayyan (Qatar)	3–1	(Iran) Saipa
Rivas 27', 90'; Soria 89'	Live Report; Stats Report	Ramezani 3'

Jassim bin Hamad Stadium, Al Rayyan
Attendance: 1,416
Referee: Ma Ning (China)

19 February 2019
18:00 UTC+3

Al-Gharafa (Qatar)	2–3	(Iran) Zob Ahan
Alaaeldin 21'; Taremi 36'	Live Report; Stats Report	Osaguona 47'; Motahari 63'; Nejadmehdi 79'

Thani bin Jassim Stadium, Al Rayyan
Attendance: 677
Referee: Hettikamkanamge Perera (Sri Lanka)

=== East Region ===
19 February 2019
19:30 UTC+9

Ulsan Hyundai (South Korea)	5–1	(Malaysia) Perak
Azhan 23' (o.g.); Diskerud 56', 58'; Lee Dong-kyeong 70'; Negrão 87'	Live Report; Stats Report	Naim 90'

Ulsan Munsu Football Stadium, Ulsan
Attendance: 2,178
Referee: Abdulrahman Al-Jassim (Qatar)

19 February 2019
15:30 UTC+8

Shandong Luneng (China)	4–1	(Vietnam) Hanoi
Liu Junshuai 65'; Pellè 73'; Liu Binbin 86'; Zhou Haibin 90+2'	Live Report; Stats Report	Nguyễn Văn Quyết 39'

Jinan Olympic Sports Center Stadium, Jinan
Attendance: 12,169
Referee: Valentin Kovalenko (Uzbekistan)

19 February 2019
19:00 UTC+9

Sanfrecce Hiroshima (Japan)	0–0 (a.e.t.)	(Thailand) Chiangrai United
	Live Report; Stats Report
Penalties
Patric (penalty scored); Kashiwa (penalty scored); Nogami (penalty scored); Kawabe (penalty missed); Matsumoto (penalty scored)	4–3	(penalty scored) Bill; (penalty missed) Tanasak; (penalty missed) Phitiwat; (penalty scored) Chaiyawat; (penalty scored) Peerapong

Hiroshima Big Arch, Hiroshima
Attendance: 2,570
Referee: Nawaf Shukralla (Bahrain)

19 February 2019
19:00 UTC+9

Kashima Antlers (Japan)	4–1	(Australia) Newcastle Jets
S. Ito 18'; Yamamoto 32'; Serginho 67' (pen.), 90+1'	Live Report; Stats Report	Vargas 23'

Kashima Soccer Stadium, Kashima
Attendance: 5,477
Referee: Mohammed Abdulla Hassan Mohamed (United Arab Emirates)
