= Ahmed Ashkar =

Syrian footballer (born 1996)

Ahmad Ashkar
Personal information
- Full name: Ahmad Ashkar
- Date of birth: December 12, 1996 (age 29)
- Place of birth: Aleppo, Syria
- Height: 1.78 m (5 ft 10 in)
- Position: Midfielder

Team information
- Current team: Al-Ittihad

Senior career*
Years	Team	Apps	(Gls)
2014–2017	Al-Hurriya		(7)
2017–2019	Al-Jaish		
2019–2020	Al-Ittihad		
2020–2021	Hutteen		
2021–2022	Al-Hidd		
2022–2023	Al-Ittihad		
2023–2024	Al-Fotuwa		
2024–	Al-Ittihad		

International career^{‡}
2011–2012	Syria U16	3	(1)
2013–	Syria U23		
2016–	Syria	28	(1)
- * Club domestic league appearances and goals as of 15 August 2017 ‡ National team caps and goals as of 31 March 2026

Ahmad Ashkar (born 12 December 1996) is a Syrian footballer who plays as a midfielder for Syrian Premier League club Al-Ittihad and the Syria national team.

== International career ==
On March 29, 2016, Ashkar made his International debut against Japan in a FIFA World Cup qualifying match that ended 5–0 for Japan.

== Career statistics ==
=== International ===
No.	Date	Venue	Opponent	Score	Result	Competition
1.	23 December 2022	Maktoum bin Rashid Al Maktoum Stadium, Dubai, UAE	Oman	1–2	1–2	Friendly
