= 2019 AFC Cup qualifying play-offs =

International football competition

The 2019 AFC Cup qualifying play-offs were played from 5 February to 13 March 2019. A total of 11 teams competed in the qualifying play-offs to decide four of the 36 places in the group stage of the 2019 AFC Cup.

== Teams ==
The following 11 teams, split into five zones (West Asia Zone, Central Asia Zone, South Asia Zone, ASEAN Zone, East Asia Zone), entered the qualifying play-offs, consisting of two rounds:

- 6 teams entered in the preliminary round.
- 5 teams entered in the play-off round.

Zone	Teams entering in play-off round	Teams entering in preliminary round
West Asia Zone	(Oman) Al-Nasr; (Palestine) Hilal Al-Quds	
Central Asia Zone	(Tajikistan) Khujand	(Turkmenistan) Ahal; (Kyrgyzstan) Alay
South Asia Zone	(India) Chennaiyin	(Bhutan) Transport United; (Sri Lanka) Colombo
ASEAN Zone	None	
East Asia Zone	(Hong Kong) Tai Po	(North Korea) Ryomyong; (Mongolia) Erchim

== Format ==
In the qualifying play-offs, each tie was played on a home-and-away two-legged basis. The away goals rule, extra time (away goals do not apply in extra time) and penalty shoot-out were used to decide the winner if necessary (Regulations Article 9.3). The four winners of the play-off round (one each from West Asia Zone, Central Asia Zone, South Asia Zone, East Asia Zone) advanced to the group stage to join the 32 direct entrants.

== Schedule ==
The schedule of each round was as follows.

Round	West Asia Zone		Central Asia Zone, South Asia Zone, East Asia Zone	
Round	First leg	Second leg	First leg	Second leg
Preliminary round	Not played		20 February 2019	27 February 2019
Play-off round	5 February 2019	12 February 2019	6 March 2019	13 March 2019

== Bracket ==
The bracket of the qualifying play-offs for each zone, determined based on the association ranking of each team, with the team from the higher-ranked association hosting the second leg, was officially announced by the AFC prior to the group stage draw on 22 November 2018.

=== Play-off West Asia ===
- (Palestine) Hilal Al-Quds advanced to Group A.

Play-off round
(Palestine) Hilal Al-Quds	2	1	3
(Oman) Al-Nasr	1	0	1

=== Play-off Central Asia ===
- (Tajikistan) Khujand advanced to Group D.

Preliminary round				Play-off round
(Kyrgyzstan) Alay	1	0	1
(Turkmenistan) Ahal	2	1	3
(Turkmenistan) Ahal	2	1	3	(Turkmenistan) Ahal	1	0	1
				(Tajikistan) Khujand (a)	1	0	1

=== Play-off South Asia ===
- (India) Chennaiyin advanced to Group E.

Preliminary round				Play-off round
(Sri Lanka) Colombo	7	2	9
(Bhutan) Transport United	1	1	2
(Bhutan) Transport United	1	1	2	(Sri Lanka) Colombo	0	0	0
				(India) Chennaiyin	0	1	1

=== Play-off East Asia ===
- (Hong Kong) Tai Po advanced to Group I.

Preliminary round				Play-off round
(Mongolia) Erchim	0	0	0
(North Korea) Ryomyong	3	3	6
(North Korea) Ryomyong	3	3	6	(North Korea) Ryomyong	0	0	0 (3)
				(Hong Kong) Tai Po (p)	0	0	0 (5)

== Preliminary round ==
=== Summary ===
A total of six teams played in the preliminary round.

Central Asia Zone
Team 1	Agg.	Team 2	1st leg	2nd leg
Alay (Kyrgyzstan)	1–3	(Turkmenistan) Ahal	1–2	0–1

South Asia Zone
Team 1	Agg.	Team 2	1st leg	2nd leg
Colombo (Sri Lanka)	9–2	(Bhutan) Transport United	7–1	2–1

East Asia Zone
Team 1	Agg.	Team 2	1st leg	2nd leg
Erchim (Mongolia)	0–6	(North Korea) Ryomyong	0–3	0–3

=== Central Asia Zone ===
20 February 2019
14:00 UTC+6

Alay (Kyrgyzstan)	1–2	(Turkmenistan) Ahal
Sardarbekov 36'	Report	Bäşimow 20', 38'

Suyumbayev Stadion, Osh
Attendance: 3,000
Referee: Omar Al-Yaqoubi (Oman)
27 February 2019
18:00 UTC+5

Ahal (Turkmenistan)	1–0	(Kyrgyzstan) Alay
Gurbanow 35'	Report

Ashgabat Stadium, Ashgabat
Attendance: 10,500
Referee: Mohammed Al-Hoish (Saudi Arabia)

Ahal won 3–1 on aggregate.

=== South Asia Zone ===
20 February 2019
15:30 UTC+5:30

Colombo (Sri Lanka)	7–1	(Bhutan) Transport United
Aakib 5', 8', 11'; Tagne 27', 76', 87'; Rahuman 81'	Report	Lepcha 77'

Colombo Racecourse, Colombo
Attendance: 2,700
Referee: Hussein Abo Yehia (Lebanon)
27 February 2019
18:00 UTC+6

Transport United (Bhutan)	1–2	(Sri Lanka) Colombo
Dorji 45'	Report	Fasal 62'; Addevu 82'

Changlimithang Stadium, Thimphu
Attendance: 826
Referee: Zhang Lei (China)

Colombo won 9–2 on aggregate.

=== East Asia Zone ===
20 February 2019
14:00 UTC+8

Erchim (Mongolia)	0–3	(North Korea) Ryomyong
	Report	Kim Song-min 12' (pen.); Ri Hun 19'; Kim Kwang-jin 42'

MFF Football Centre, Ulaanbaatar
Attendance: 416
Referee: Yaqoub Al-Hammadi (United Arab Emirates)
27 February 2019
14:00 UTC+9

Ryomyong (North Korea)	3–0	(Mongolia) Erchim
Kim Song-min 35', 77'; Pak Chol-yong 70'	Report

Kim Il-sung Stadium, Pyongyang
Attendance: 2,000
Referee: Ahmad Yacoub Ibrahim (Jordan)

Ryomyong won 6–0 on aggregate.

== Play-off round ==
=== Summary ===
A total of eight teams played in the play-off round: five teams which entered in this round, and three winners of the preliminary round.

West Asia Zone
Team 1	Agg.	Team 2	1st leg	2nd leg
Hilal Al-Quds (Palestine)	3–1	(Oman) Al-Nasr	2–1	1–0

Central Asia Zone
Team 1	Agg.	Team 2	1st leg	2nd leg
Ahal (Turkmenistan)	1–1 (a)	(Tajikistan) Khujand	1–1	0–0

South Asia Zone
Team 1	Agg.	Team 2	1st leg	2nd leg
Colombo (Sri Lanka)	0–1	(India) Chennaiyin	0–0	0–1

East Asia Zone
Team 1	Agg.	Team 2	1st leg	2nd leg
Ryomyong (North Korea)	0–0 (3–5 p)	(Hong Kong) Tai Po	0–0	0–0 (a.e.t.)

=== West Asia Zone ===
5 February 2019
17:00 UTC+2

Hilal Al-Quds (Palestine)	2–1	(Oman) Al-Nasr
Dabbagh 51'; Farawi 54'	Report	Abdel-Halim 64'

Faisal Al-Husseini International Stadium, Al-Ram
Attendance: 3,150
Referee: Muhammad Nazmi Nasaruddin (Malaysia)
12 February 2019
19:30 UTC+4

Al-Nasr (Oman)	0–1	(Palestine) Hilal Al-Quds
	Report	Dabbagh 74'

Salalah Sports Complex, Salalah
Attendance: 350
Referee: Ali Shaban (Kuwait)

Hilal Al-Quds won 3–1 on aggregate.

=== Central Asia Zone ===
6 March 2019
18:00 UTC+5

Ahal (Turkmenistan)	1–1	(Tajikistan) Khujand
Durdyýew 29'	Report	J. Ergashev 11'

Ashgabat Stadium, Ashgabat
Attendance: 18,100
Referee: C. R. Srikrishna (India)
13 March 2019
14:00 UTC+5

Khujand (Tajikistan)	0–0	(Turkmenistan) Ahal
	Report

20 Years of Independence Stadium, Khujand
Attendance: 25,000
Referee: Sivakorn Pu-udom (Thailand)

1–1 on aggregate. Khujand won on away goals.

=== South Asia Zone ===
6 March 2019
15:30 UTC+5:30

Colombo (Sri Lanka)	0–0	(India) Chennaiyin
	Report

Colombo Racecourse, Colombo
Attendance: 2,850
Referee: Mohammad Arafah (Jordan)
13 March 2019
19:30 UTC+5:30

Chennaiyin (India)	1–0	(Sri Lanka) Colombo
Lalpekhlua 68'	Report

The Arena, Ahmedabad
Attendance: 2,842
Referee: Ammar Mahfoodh (Bahrain)

Chennaiyin won 1–0 on aggregate.

=== East Asia Zone ===
6 March 2019
16:00 UTC+9

Ryomyong (North Korea)	0–0	(Hong Kong) Tai Po
	Report

Kim Il-sung Stadium, Pyongyang
Attendance: 3,800
Referee: Payam Heidari (Iran)
13 March 2019
20:00 UTC+8

Tai Po (Hong Kong)	0–0 (a.e.t.)	(North Korea) Ryomyong
	Report
Penalties
Sartori (penalty scored); João Emir (penalty scored); Eduardo (penalty scored); Sawyer (penalty scored); Sandro (penalty scored)	5–3	(penalty missed) Jo Kwang-myong; (penalty scored) Ro Jong-hyok; (penalty scored) Pak Kwang-chon; (penalty scored) Pak Chol-yong

Mong Kok Stadium, Hong Kong
Attendance: 4,434
Referee: Sherzod Kasimov (Uzbekistan)

0–0 on aggregate. Tai Po won 5–3 on penalties.
