= 2019 AFC Cup knockout stage =

International football competition

The 2019 AFC Cup knockout stage was played from 17 June to 4 November 2019. A total of 11 teams competed in the knockout stage to decide the champions of the 2019 AFC Cup.

== Qualified teams ==
The following teams advanced from the group stage:

- The winners of each of the three groups and the best runners-up in the West Asia Zone (Groups A–C) and the ASEAN Zone (Groups F–H) advanced to the Zonal semi-finals.
- The winners of each group in the Central Asia Zone (Group D), the South Asia Zone (Group E), and the East Asia Zone (Group I) advanced to the Inter-zone play-off semi-finals.

Key to colours
Teams which enter the Inter-zone play-off semi-finals
Teams which enter the Zonal semi-finals

Zone	Group	Winners	Best runners-up
West Asia Zone	A	(Jordan) Al-Wehdat	(Syria) Al-Jaish (Group A)
West Asia Zone	B	(Jordan) Al-Jazeera	(Syria) Al-Jaish (Group A)
West Asia Zone	C	(Lebanon) Al-Ahed	(Syria) Al-Jaish (Group A)
Central Asia Zone	D	(Turkmenistan) Altyn Asyr	—
South Asia Zone	E	(Bangladesh) Abahani Limited Dhaka	—
ASEAN Zone	F	(Vietnam) Hà Nội	(Vietnam) Becamex Bình Dương (Group G)
ASEAN Zone	G	(Philippines) Ceres–Negros	(Vietnam) Becamex Bình Dương (Group G)
ASEAN Zone	H	(Indonesia) PSM Makassar	(Vietnam) Becamex Bình Dương (Group G)
East Asia Zone	I	(North Korea) April 25	—

== Format ==
In the knockout stage, the 11 teams played a single-elimination tournament. Each tie was played on a home-and-away two-legged basis, except the final which was played as a single match. The away goals rule (for two-legged ties), extra time (away goals do not apply in extra time) and penalty shoot-out were used to decide the winners if necessary (Regulations Article 11.3).

== Schedule ==
The schedule of each round is as follows (W: West Asia Zone; A: ASEAN Zone). Matches in the West Asia Zone were played on Mondays and Tuesdays, while matches in the ASEAN Zone and the Inter-zone play-offs were played on Tuesdays and Wednesdays.

Round	First leg	Second leg
Zonal semi-finals	17–19 June 2019 (W, A)	24–26 June 2019 (W, A)
Zonal finals	31 July 2019 (A), 24 September 2019 (W)	7 August 2019 (A), 1 October 2019 (W)
Inter-zone play-off semi-finals	20–21 August 2019	27–28 August 2019
Inter-zone play-off final	25 September 2019	2 October 2019
Final	4 November 2019	

== Bracket ==
The bracket of the knockout stage was determined as follows:

Round	Matchups
Zonal semi-finals	(Matchups and order of legs determined by identity of best runners-up: first team listed host first leg, second team listed host second leg) West Asia Zone: If best runners-up from Group A; WSF1: Group A winners vs. Group C winners; WSF2: Group A runners-up vs. Group B winners; If best runners-up from Group B; WSF1: Group B winners vs. Group A winners; WSF2: Group B runners-up vs. Group C winners; If best runners-up from Group C; WSF1: Group C winners vs. Group B winners; WSF2: Group C runners-up vs. Group A winners; ASEAN Zone: If best runners-up from Group F; ASF1: Group F winners vs. Group H winners; ASF2: Group F runners-up vs. Group G winners; If best runners-up from Group G; ASF1: Group G winners vs. Group F winners; ASF2: Group G runners-up vs. Group H winners; If best runners-up from Group H; ASF1: Group H winners vs. Group G winners; ASF2: Group H runners-up vs. Group F winners
Zonal finals	(Order of legs decided by draw) West Asia Zone: WF: Winners of WSF1 vs. Winners of WSF2; ASEAN Zone: AF: Winners of ASF1 vs. Winners of ASF2
Inter-zone play-off semi-finals	(Matchups and order of legs decided by draw, involving winners of Group D, Group E, Group I, and AF): IZSF1; IZSF2
Inter-zone play-off final	(Winners of IZSF1 host first leg, Winners of IZSF2 host second leg): IZF: Winners of IZSF1 vs. Winners of IZSF2
Final	(Winners of IZF host match, as alternated from previous season's final): Winners of IZF vs. Winners of WF

The bracket was decided after the draw for the Zonal finals and the Inter-zone play-off semi-finals, which was held on 2 July 2019, 15:00 MYT (UTC+8), at the AFC House in Kuala Lumpur, Malaysia.

Zonal semi-finals
(Vietnam) Becamex Bình Dương (a)	1	1	2
(Indonesia) PSM Makassar	0	2	2
(Philippines) Ceres–Negros	1	1	2
(Vietnam) Hà Nội	1	2	3
(Syria) Al-Jaish	3	0	3
(Jordan) Al-Jazeera	0	4	4
(Jordan) Al-Wehdat	0	0	0
(Lebanon) Al-Ahed	1	0	1

Zonal finals
(Vietnam) Becamex Bình Dương	0	0	0
(Vietnam) Hà Nội	1	1	2
(Jordan) Al-Jazeera	0	0	0
(Lebanon) Al-Ahed	0	1	1

Interzone play-off semi-finals
(Vietnam) Hà Nội	3	2	5
(Turkmenistan) Altyn Asyr	2	2	4
(Bangladesh) Abahani Limited Dhaka	4	0	4
(North Korea) April 25	3	2	5

Interzone play-off final
(Vietnam) Hà Nội	2	0	2
(North Korea) April 25 (a)	2	0	2

Final
(North Korea) April 25	0
(Lebanon) Al-Ahed	1

== Zonal semi-finals ==
=== Summary ===
In the Zonal semi-finals, the four qualified teams from the West Asia Zone (Groups A–C) played in two ties, and the four qualified teams from the ASEAN Zone (Groups F–H) played in two ties, with the matchups and order of legs determined by the group stage draw and the identity of the best runners-up.

West Asia Zone
Team 1	Agg.	Team 2	1st leg	2nd leg
Al-Wehdat (Jordan)	0–1	(Lebanon) Al-Ahed	0–1	0–0
Al-Jaish (Syria)	3–4	(Jordan) Al-Jazeera	3–0	0–4

ASEAN Zone
Team 1	Agg.	Team 2	1st leg	2nd leg
Ceres–Negros (Philippines)	2–3	(Vietnam) Hà Nội	1–1	1–2
Becamex Bình Dương (Vietnam)	2–2 (a)	(Indonesia) PSM Makassar	1–0	1–2

=== West Asia Zone ===
17 June 2019
19:00 UTC+3

Al-Wehdat (Jordan)	0–1	(Lebanon) Al-Ahed
	Live Report; Stats Report	Kdouh 79'

King Abdullah II Stadium, Amman
Attendance: 10,912
Referee: Mohd Amirul Izwan Yaacob (Malaysia)
24 June 2019
19:00 UTC+3

Al-Ahed (Lebanon)	0–0	(Jordan) Al-Wehdat
	Live Report; Stats Report

Camille Chamoun Sports City Stadium, Beirut
Attendance: 7,573
Referee: Kim Hee-gon (South Korea)

Al-Ahed won 1–0 on aggregate.

18 June 2019
19:15 UTC+3

Al-Jaish (Syria)	3–0	(Jordan) Al-Jazeera
Moustafa 57', 62'; Al Wakid 79'	Live Report; Stats Report

Al Muharraq Stadium, Arad (Bahrain) (Note: Teams from Syria were not allowed to host their home matches in their country due to security concerns.)
Attendance: 50
Referee: Nivon Robesh Gamini (Sri Lanka)
25 June 2019
19:30 UTC+3

Al-Jazeera (Jordan)	4–0	(Syria) Al-Jaish
Al-Attar 5'; Shelbaieh 48' (pen.); Al-Essawi 65'; Jaber 90+3'	Live Report; Stats Report

Amman International Stadium, Amman
Attendance: 505
Referee: Liu Kwok Man (Hong Kong)

Al-Jazeera won 4–3 on aggregate.

=== ASEAN Zone ===
18 June 2019
19:30 UTC+8

Ceres–Negros (Philippines)	1–1	(Vietnam) Hà Nội
Marañón 57'	Live Report; Stats Report	Faye 67'

Panaad Stadium, Bacolod
Attendance: 6,007
Referee: Yaqoob Abdul Baki (Oman)
25 June 2019
19:00 UTC+7

Hà Nội (Vietnam)	2–1	(Philippines) Ceres–Negros
Faye 59'; Nguyễn Văn Quyết 64'	Live Report; Stats Report	Dizon 85'

Hàng Đẫy Stadium, Hanoi
Attendance: 4,839
Referee: Yu Ming-hsun (Chinese Taipei)

Hà Nội won 3–2 on aggregate.

19 June 2019
17:00 UTC+7

Becamex Bình Dương (Vietnam)	1–0	(Indonesia) PSM Makassar
Nguyễn Tiến Linh 80'	Live Report; Stats Report

Gò Đậu Stadium, Thủ Dầu Một
Attendance: 2,313
Referee: Rowan Arumughan (India)
26 June 2019
15:30 UTC+7

PSM Makassar (Indonesia)	2–1	(Vietnam) Becamex Bình Dương
Hồ Tấn Tài 75' (o.g.); Evans 87'	Live Report; Stats Report	Luiz 45+3'

Pakansari Stadium, Cibinong (Note: PSM Makassar played their home matches at Pakansari Stadium, Cibinong, instead of their home Andi Mattalata Stadium, Makassar, since the stadium did not meet AFC regulations.)
Attendance: 1,839
Referee: Ahmed Al-Ali (Jordan)

2–2 on aggregate. Becamex Bình Dương won on away goals.

== Zonal finals ==
=== Summary ===
The draw for the Zonal finals was held on 2 July 2019. In the Zonal finals, the two winners of West Asia Zonal semi-finals play each other, and the two winners of ASEAN Zonal semi-finals play each other, with the order of legs decided by draw. The winners of the West Asia Zonal final advanced to the final, while the winners of the ASEAN Zonal final advanced to the Inter-zone play-off semi-finals.

West Asia Zone
Team 1	Agg.	Team 2	1st leg	2nd leg
Al-Jazeera (Jordan)	0–1	(Lebanon) Al-Ahed	0–0	0–1

ASEAN Zone
Team 1	Agg.	Team 2	1st leg	2nd leg
Becamex Bình Dương (Vietnam)	0–2	(Vietnam) Hà Nội	0–1	0–1

=== West Asia Zone ===
24 September 2019
19:30 UTC+3

Al-Jazeera (Jordan)	0–0	(Lebanon) Al-Ahed
	Live Report; Stats Report

Amman International Stadium, Amman
Attendance: 5,032
Referee: Abdulrahman Al-Jassim (Qatar)
1 October 2019
19:00 UTC+3

Al-Ahed (Lebanon)	1–0	(Jordan) Al-Jazeera
Akaïchi 32'	Live Report; Stats Report

Camille Chamoun Sports City Stadium, Beirut
Attendance: 10,422
Referee: Mohanad Qassim (Iraq)

Al-Ahed won 1–0 on aggregate.

=== ASEAN Zone ===
31 July 2019
17:00 UTC+7

Becamex Bình Dương (Vietnam)	0–1	(Vietnam) Hà Nội
	Live Report; Stats Report	Nguyễn Văn Quyết 33'

Gò Đậu Stadium, Thủ Dầu Một
Attendance: 10,225
Referee: Ammar Al-Jeneibi (United Arab Emirates)
7 August 2019
19:00 UTC+7

Hà Nội (Vietnam)	1–0	(Vietnam) Becamex Bình Dương
Faye 61'	Live Report; Stats Report

Hàng Đẫy Stadium, Hanoi
Attendance: 6,710
Referee: Ilgiz Tantashev (Uzbekistan)

Hà Nội won 2–0 on aggregate.

== Inter-zone play-off semi-finals ==
=== Summary ===
The draw for the Inter-zone play-off semi-finals was held on 2 July 2019. In the Inter-zone play-off semi-finals, the four zonal winners other than the West Asia Zone play in two ties, i.e., the winners of the Central Asia Zone (Group D), the winners of the South Asia Zone (Group E), the winners of the East Asia Zone (Group I), and the winners of the ASEAN Zonal final (whose identity was not known at the time of the draw), with the matchups and order of legs decided by draw, without any seeding.

Team 1	Agg.	Team 2	1st leg	2nd leg
Hà Nội (Vietnam)	5–4	(Turkmenistan) Altyn Asyr	3–2	2–2
Abahani Limited Dhaka (Bangladesh)	4–5	(North Korea) April 25	4–3	0–2

=== Matches ===
20 August 2019
19:00 UTC+7

Hà Nội (Vietnam)	3–2	(Turkmenistan) Altyn Asyr
Nguyễn Quang Hải 41', 61'; Nguyễn Văn Quyết 88' (pen.)	Live Report; Stats Report	Ýakşiýew 4'; Annadurdyýew 64'

Hàng Đẫy Stadium, Hanoi
Attendance: 6,250
Referee: Kim Dae-yong (South Korea)
27 August 2019
17:00 UTC+5

Altyn Asyr (Turkmenistan)	2–2	(Vietnam) Hà Nội
Geldiýew 45+1' (pen.), 82' (pen.)	Live Report; Stats Report	Nguyễn Văn Quyết 15', 51'

Köpetdag Stadium, Ashgabat
Attendance: 10,755
Referee: Masoud Tufayelieh (Syria)

Hà Nội won 5–4 on aggregate.

21 August 2019
18:45 UTC+6

Abahani Limited Dhaka (Bangladesh)	4–3	(North Korea) April 25
S. Rana 33'; Jibon 37'; Chizoba 57', 61'	Live Report; Stats Report	Choe Jong-hyok 35'; Rim Chol-min 54'; Pak Song-rok 77'

Bangabandhu National Stadium, Dhaka
Attendance: 3,640
Referee: Sivakorn Pu-udom (Thailand)
28 August 2019
18:00 UTC+9

April 25 (North Korea)	2–0	(Bangladesh) Abahani Limited Dhaka
Kim Yu-song 49', 83'	Live Report; Stats Report

Kim Il-sung Stadium, Pyongyang
Attendance: 3,600
Referee: Mooud Bonyadifar (Iran)

April 25 won 5–4 on aggregate.

== Inter-zone play-off final ==
=== Summary ===
In the Inter-zone play-off final, the two winners of the Inter-zone play-off semi-finals play each other, with the order of legs determined by the Inter-zone play-off semi-final draw. The winners of the Inter-zone play-off final advance to the final.

Team 1	Agg.	Team 2	1st leg	2nd leg
Hà Nội (Vietnam)	2–2 (a)	(North Korea) April 25	2–2	0–0

=== Matches ===
25 September 2019
19:00 UTC+7

Hà Nội (Vietnam)	2–2	(North Korea) April 25
Nguyễn Văn Quyết 21'; Kébé 28'	Live Report; Stats Report	Rim Chol-min 19'; Kim Yu-song 87'

Hàng Đẫy Stadium, Hanoi
Attendance: 6,683
Referee: Fu Ming (China)
2 October 2019
17:00 UTC+9

April 25 (North Korea)	0–0	(Vietnam) Hà Nội
	Live Report; Stats Report

Kim Il-sung Stadium, Pyongyang
Attendance: 5,500
Referee: Turki Al-Khudhayr (Saudi Arabia)

2–2 on aggregate. April 25 won on away goals.

== Final ==
In the final, the winners of the West Asia Zonal final and the winners of the Inter-zone play-off final played each other, with the host team (winners of the Inter-zone play-off final) alternated from the previous season's final.

The match was originally to be hosted by April 25 at the Kim Il-sung Stadium in Pyongyang, North Korea on 2 November 2019. However, on 22 October 2019, due to North Korea's decision to ban television transmission of football games, the AFC announced that the final would be held in Shanghai, China in order for the match to be transmitted. On 25 October 2019, the match was rescheduled from 2 November to 4 November and the host city was shifted from Shanghai to Kuala Lumpur, Malaysia.

4 November 2019
21:00 UTC+8

April 25 (North Korea)	0–1	(Lebanon) Al-Ahed
	Live Report; Stats Report	Yakubu 74'

Kuala Lumpur Stadium, Kuala Lumpur
Attendance: 500
Referee: Hettikamkanamge Perera (Sri Lanka)
