= Vinicius Miller =

Brazilian footballer

Personal information
- Full name: Vinicius Guirra Miller de Oliveira
- Date of birth: 23 November 1990 (age 35)
- Place of birth: Rio de Janeiro, Brazil
- Height: 1.74 m (5 ft 9 in)
- Position: Midfielder

Youth career
- –2012: Botafogo
- 2010: → Boavista-RJ (loan)

Senior career*
Years	Team	Apps	(Gls)
2013	Ceres		
2014	ASA	0	(0)
2015	Bonsucesso	0	(0)
2015	Macaé	0	(0)
2016	Boavista-RJ	0	(0)
2017–2018	Blumenau	0	(0)
2019	Yangon United	13	(3)
2020–2021	Bangu	23	(2)
2022	Portuguesa-RJ	6	(1)
2022	Barra da Tijuca	12	(3)
- * Club domestic league appearances and goals as of 20:48, 22 June 2024 (UTC)

Vinicius Guirra Miller de Oliveira (born 23 November 1990), commonly known as Vinicius Miller or simply Miller, is a Brazilian professional footballer.

== Career statistics ==
=== Club ===
As of 4 July 2019.

Club	Season	League			State League		Cup		Continental		Other		Total	
Club	Season	Division	Apps	Goals	Apps	Goals	Apps	Goals	Apps	Goals	Apps	Goals	Apps	Goals
ASA	2014	Série C	0	0	8 (Note: Appearances in the Campeonato Alagoano)	0	0	0	–		0	0	8	0
Bonsucesso	2015	–			3 (Note: Appearances in the Campeonato Carioca)	0	0	0	–		0	0	3	0
Macaé	2015	Série B	0	0	0	0	0	0	–		1 (Note: Appearances in the Copa Rio)	0	1	0
Boavista-RJ	2016	Série D	0	0	0	0	0	0	–		5	0	5	0
Blumenau	2018	–			12 (Note: Appearances in the Campeonato Catarinense Série B)	2	0	0	–		0	0	12	2
Yangon United	2019	Myanmar National League	11	3	–		0	0	8 (Note: Two appearances and one goal in AFC Champions League qualification, six appearances and three goals in the AFC Cup)	4	0	0	19	7
Career total			11	3	23	2	0	0	8	4	6	0	48	9
