= 2025 AFC Challenge League final =

Football match

- Event: 2024–25 AFC Challenge League
Svay Rieng	Arkadag
(Cambodia)	(Turkmenistan)
1	2
- After extra time
- Date: 10 May 2025
- Venue: Morodok Techo National Stadium, Phnom Penh, Cambodia
- Referee: Kim Hee-gon (South Korea)
- Attendance: 51,610
- Weather: Light thunderstorms and rain 27 °C (81 °F); 87% humidity

The 2025 AFC Challenge League final was the final match of the 2024–25 AFC Challenge League, the 11th season of Asia's third-highest club football tournament organised by the Asian Football Confederation (AFC), and the first since it was rebranded as the AFC Challenge League. It was played on 10 May 2025 in Phnom Penh, Cambodia, between local club Svay Rieng and Turkmenistani side Arkadag, both of which reached a continental final for the first time.

The winners were given an indirect preliminary stage slot for the 2025–26 AFC Champions League Two, if they had not already qualified through their domestic performance.

== Teams ==
Team	Region (Federation)	Previous finals appearances (bold indicates winners)
(Cambodia) Svay Rieng	East (AFF)	None
(Turkmenistan) Arkadag	West (CAFA)	None

== Venue ==
The final venue was pre-determined on a rotation basis, with the match hosted by the Svay Rieng in Phnom Penh, Cambodia.

== Route to the final ==
Svay Rieng (Cambodia)				Round	(Turkmenistan) Arkadag			
Opponent	Result			Group stage	Opponent	Result		
(Mongolia) SP Falcons	2–1			Matchday 1	(Maldives) Maziya	2–1		
(Indonesia) Madura United	1–2			Matchday 2	(Kyrgyzstan) Abdysh-Ata Kant	2–0		
N/A				Matchday 3	(Kuwait) Al Arabi	2–3		
**Group E runners-up**: Pos / Team / Pld / Pts; 1 / (Indonesia) Madura United / 2 / **4**; **2** / (Cambodia) Svay Rieng / **2** / **3**; 3 / (Mongolia) SP Falcons (H) / 2 / **1**; Source: AFC (H) Hosts				Final standings	**Group B winners**: Pos / Team / Pld / Pts; **1** / (Turkmenistan) Arkadag / **3** / **6**; 2 / (Kuwait) Al-Arabi (H) / 3 / **6**; 3 / (Kyrgyzstan) Abdysh-Ata Kant / 3 / **6**; 4 / (Maldives) Maziya / 3 / **0**; Source: AFC (H) Hosts			
Opponent	Agg.	1st leg	2nd leg	Knockout stage	Opponent	Agg.	1st leg	2nd leg
(Myanmar) Shan United	7–4	6–2 (H)	1–2 (A)	Quarter-finals	(India) East Bengal	3–1	1–0 (A)	2–1 (H)
(Indonesia) Madura United	6–3	3–0 (H)	3–3 (A)	Semi-finals	(Kuwait) Al-Arabi	3–2	0–2 (A)	3–0 (H)

== Match details ==
10 May 2025
19:00 UTC+7

Svay Rieng (Cambodia)	1–2 (a.e.t.)	(Turkmenistan) Arkadag
Krya 82'	Report	Saparow 59'; Annadurdyýew 112'

Morodok Techo National Stadium, Phnom Penh
Attendance: 51,610
Referee: Kim Hee-gon (South Korea)

**Svay Rieng**	**Arkadag**

GK	27	(Cambodia) Vireak Dara
CB	28	(Hong Kong) Ryo Fujii
CB	25	(Cambodia) Chou Sinti		(substituted off) 109'
CB	61	(Japan) Takashi Odawara		(substituted off) 114'
RWB	13	(Cambodia) Sareth Krya
LWB	97	(Brazil) Breninho
DM	5	(Cambodia) Soeuy Visal (c)
RM	30	(Cambodia) Nhean Sosidan		(substituted off) 74'
CM	17	(Laos) Bounphachan Bounkong		(substituted off) 55'
LM	9	(Brazil) Gabriel Silva		(substituted off) 91'
CF	21	(Brazil) Cristian	(yellow card) 37'	(substituted off) 55'
Substitutes:
GK	18	(Cambodia) Aim Sovannarath
GK	31	(Cambodia) Sang Hankhun
DF	3	(Cambodia) Sath Rosib
MF	6	(Cambodia) Hikaru Mizuno		(substituted on) 114'
MF	10	(Cambodia) Dani Kouch		(substituted on) 109'
MF	16	(Cambodia) Kim Sokyuth
MF	26	(Cambodia) Min Ratanak		(substituted on) 74'
MF	29	(Cambodia) Soun Sovan
MF	93	(Cambodia) Thierry Bin
FW	8	(Brazil) Pablo		(substituted on) 55'
FW	11	(Cambodia) Nick Taylor		(substituted on) 91'
FW	98	(Brazil) Moresche		(substituted on) 55'
Manager:
(Spain) Pep Muñoz

GK	16	(Turkmenistan) Rasul Çaryýew	(yellow card) 120+5'
CB	4	(Turkmenistan) Mekan Saparow
CB	2	(Turkmenistan) Güýçmyrat Annagulyýew
CB	5	(Turkmenistan) Abdy Bäşimow (c)
RM	12	(Turkmenistan) Ybraýym Mämmedow		(substituted off) 71'
CM	13	(Turkmenistan) Welmyrat Ballakow		(substituted off) 72'
CM	21	(Turkmenistan) Mirza Beknazarow
LM	8	(Turkmenistan) Yhlas Saparmämmedow		(substituted off) 80'
RF	14	(Turkmenistan) Şanazar Tirkişow		(substituted off) 110'
CF	11	(Turkmenistan) Didar Durdyýew		(substituted off) 60'
LF	31	(Turkmenistan) Yazgylyç Gurbanow		(substituted off) 72'
Substitutes:
GK	1	(Turkmenistan) Rüstem Ahallyýew
DF	25	(Turkmenistan) Ilýas Çaryýew
MF	18	(Turkmenistan) Arzuwguly Sapargulýyew		(substituted on) 80'
MF	19	(Turkmenistan) Begenç Akmämmedow		(substituted on) 60'
MF	77	(Turkmenistan) Şamämmet Hydyrow		(substituted on) 110'
MF	88	(Turkmenistan) Ahmet Ataýew		(substituted on) 72'
FW	9	(Turkmenistan) Enwer Annaýew
FW	17	(Turkmenistan) Altymyrat Annadurdyýew		(substituted on) 72'
FW	23	(Turkmenistan) Berdimyrat Rejebow		(substituted on) 71'
Manager:
(Turkmenistan) Ahmet Allaberdyýew			(yellow card) 45+4'

Assistant referees:
Yoon Jae-yeol (South Korea)
Jeon Jin-hee (South Korea)
Fourth official:
Kim Dae-yong (South Korea)
Fifth official:
Bang Gi-yeol (South Korea)
Video assistant referee:
Kim Woo-sung (South Korea)
Assistant video assistant referee:
Chae Sang-hyeop (South Korea)

**Match rules**

- 90 minutes.
- 30 minutes of extra time if tied.
- Penalty shoot-out if still tied after extra time.
- Twelve named substitutes, of which up to five may be used, with a sixth allowed in extra time. (Note: Each team was only given three opportunities to make substitutions, with a fourth opportunity in extra time, excluding substitutions made at half-time, before the start of extra time and at half-time in extra time.)

== See also ==
- 2025 AFC Champions League Elite final (1st Tier)
- 2025 AFC Champions League Two final (2nd Tier)
- 2025 AFC Women's Champions League final (Women's)
