= 2024–25 AFC Challenge League knockout stage =

The 2024–25 AFC Challenge League knockout stage was played from 5 March to 10 May 2025. A total of 8 teams competed in the knockout stage to decide the champions of the 2024–25 AFC Challenge League.

== Qualified teams ==
The following teams advanced from the group stage:

- The winners of the groups and the best runners-up in the West Region (Groups A–C).
- The winners and runner-ups of each group in the East Region (Groups D–E).

Region	Group	Winners	Runners-up
West Region	A	(India) East Bengal	—N/a
West Region	B	(Turkmenistan) Arkadag	(Kuwait) Al-Arabi
West Region	C	(Oman) Al-Seeb	—N/a
East Region	D	(Myanmar) Shan United	(Chinese Taipei) Tainan City
East Region	E	(Indonesia) Madura United	(Cambodia) Svay Rieng

== Format ==
In the knockout stage, the eight teams play a single-elimination tournament. Each tie was played on a home-and-away two-legged basis, except the final which is played as a single match. Extra time and penalty shoot-out will be used to decide the winners if necessary. (Regulations Article 10).

Round	Matchups
Quarter-finals	West Region (Matchups and order of legs determined by identity of best runners-up: first team listed host first leg, second team listed host second leg): If best runners-up from Group A; QF1: Group A runners-up vs. Group B winners; QF2: Group C winners vs. Group A winners; If best runners-up from Group B; QF1: Group B runners-up vs. Group C winners; QF2: Group A winners vs. Group B winners; If best runners-up from Group C; QF1: Group C runners-up vs. Group A winners; QF2: Group B winners vs. Group C winners; East Region (First team listed host first leg, second team listed host second leg): QF3: Group E runners-up vs. Group D winners; QF4: Group D runners-up vs. Group E winners
Semi-finals	(First team listed host first leg, second team listed host second leg) West Region: SF1: Winners of QF1 vs. Winners of QF2; East Region: SF2: Winners of QF3 vs. Winners of QF4
Final	(Winners of East Region semi-finals host match): Winners of SF2 vs. Winners of SF1

== Schedule ==
After the draw, the schedule of each round is as follows.

Stage	Round	First leg	Second leg
Knockout stage	Quarter-finals	5–6 March 2025	12–13 March 2025
Knockout stage	Semi-finals	9–10 April 2025	16–17 April 2025
Knockout stage	Final	10 May 2025	

== Bracket ==
Quarter-finals
E2	(Cambodia) Svay Rieng	6	1	7
D1	(Myanmar) Shan United	2	2	4
East Region
D2	(Chinese Taipei) Tainan City	0	0	0
E1	(Indonesia) Madura United	0	3	3
B2	(Kuwait) Al-Arabi (a.e.t.)	1	2	3
C1	(Oman) Al-Seeb	0	2	2
West Region
A1	(India) East Bengal	0	1	1
B1	(Turkmenistan) Arkadag	1	2	3

Semi-finals
(Cambodia) Svay Rieng	3	3	6
(Indonesia) Madura United	0	3	3
(Kuwait) Al-Arabi	2	0	2
(Turkmenistan) Arkadag	0	3	3

Final
(Cambodia) Svay Rieng	1
(Turkmenistan) Arkadag (a.e.t.)	2

== Quarter-finals ==
=== Summary ===
In the quarter-finals, the eight qualified teams played in two ties, with the matchups and order of legs determined by the group stage draw and the identity of the best runners-up in the West region.

Team 1	Agg.	Team 2	1st leg	2nd leg
West Region
Al-Arabi (Kuwait)	3–2	(Oman) Al-Seeb	1–0	2–2 (a.e.t.)
East Bengal (India)	1–3	(Turkmenistan) Arkadag	0–1	1–2
East Region
Svay Rieng (Cambodia)	7–4	(Myanmar) Shan United	6–2	1–2
Tainan City (Chinese Taipei)	0–3	(Indonesia) Madura United	0–0	0–3

=== West Region ===
5 March 2025
21:30 UTC+3

Al-Arabi (Kuwait)	1–0	(Oman) Al-Seeb
Al Salamah 90+1'	Report

Jaber Al-Mubarak Al-Hamad Stadium, Sulaibikhat
Attendance: 4,327
Referee: Sultan Mohamed Yousif (United Arab Emirates)
12 March 2025
22:00 UTC+4

Al-Seeb (Oman)	2–2 (a.e.t.)	(Kuwait) Al-Arabi
Al-Mushaifri 41'; Kamara 89'	Report	Ashkanani 23'; Bouchar 102'

Al-Seeb Stadium, Al-Seeb
Attendance: 4,387
Referee: Thoriq Alkatiri (Indonesia)

Al-Arabi won 3–2 on aggregate.

5 March 2025
19:00 UTC+5:30

East Bengal (India)	0–1	(Turkmenistan) Arkadag
	Report	Gurbanow 10'

Vivekananda Yuba Bharati Krirangan, Kolkata
Attendance: 25,497
Referee: Mohammed Ahmed Al-Shammari (Qatar)
12 March 2025
15:30 UTC+5

Arkadag (Turkmenistan)	2–1	(India) East Bengal
Annadurdyýew 89' (pen.), 90+8'	Report	Bouli 1'

Arkadag Stadium, Arkadag
Attendance: 10,000
Referee: Sheikh Ahmad Alaeddin (Lebanon)

Arkadag won 3–1 on aggregate.

=== East Region ===
6 March 2025
19:00 UTC+7

Svay Rieng (Cambodia)	6–2	(Myanmar) Shan United
Cristian 17' (pen.), 31', 58' (pen.); Fujii 54'; Zwe Khant Min 65' (o.g.); Ratanak 75'	Report	Krya 38' (o.g.); Efrain 88'

Morodok Techo National Stadium, Phnom Penh
Attendance: 15,778
Referee: Hiroki Kasahara (Japan)
13 March 2025
17:00 UTC+6:30

Shan United (Myanmar)	2–1	(Cambodia) Svay Rieng
Khun Kyaw Zin Hein 1'; Ye Yint Aung 26'	Report	Moresche 56' (pen.)

Thuwunna Stadium, Yangon
Attendance: 550
Referee: Amir Arab Baraghi (Iran)

Svay Rieng won 7–4 on aggregate.

6 March 2025
19:00 UTC+8

Tainan City (Chinese Taipei)	0–0	(Indonesia) Madura United
	Report

Kaohsiung Nanzih Football Stadium, Kaohsiung
Attendance: 892
Referee: Choi Hyun-jai (South Korea)
13 March 2025
20:30 UTC+7

Madura United (Indonesia)	3–0	(Chinese Taipei) Tainan City
Iran 38'; Lulinha 59'; Ezzejjari 84'	Report

Gelora Joko Samudro Stadium, Gresik
Attendance: 1,379
Referee: Zaid Thamer Mohammed (Iraq)

Madura United won 3–0 on aggregate.

== Semi-finals ==
=== Summary ===
In the semi-finals, the winners of quarter-finals from each region faced each other in a two-legged tie. The winners of each tie advanced to the final.

Team 1	Agg.	Team 2	1st leg	2nd leg
West Region
Al-Arabi (Kuwait)	2–3	(Turkmenistan) Arkadag	2–0	0–3
East Region
Svay Rieng (Cambodia)	6–3	(Indonesia) Madura United	3–0	3–3

=== West Region ===
9 April 2025
19:00 UTC+3

Al-Arabi (Kuwait)	2–0	(Turkmenistan) Arkadag
John 70'; Al-Awadhi 90+3'	Report

Jaber Al-Mubarak Al-Hamad Stadium, Sulaibikhat
Attendance: 2,673
Referee: Choi Hyun-jai (South Korea)
16 April 2025
15:30 UTC+5

Arkadag (Turkmenistan)	3–0	(Kuwait) Al-Arabi
Tirkişow 7', 90+4'; Annadurdyýew 58'	Report

Arkadag Stadium, Arkadag
Attendance: 10,000
Referee: Hiroki Kasahara (Japan)

Arkadag won 3–2 on aggregate.

=== East Region ===
10 April 2025
19:00 UTC+7

Svay Rieng (Cambodia)	3–0	(Indonesia) Madura United
Breninho 4'; Bounphachan 6'; Ratanak 90'	Report

Morodok Techo National Stadium, Phnom Penh
Attendance: 10,765
Referee: Asker Nadjafaliev (Uzbekistan)
17 April 2025
15:30 UTC+7

Madura United (Indonesia)	3–3	(Cambodia) Svay Rieng
Monteiro 27'; Andi 58'; Vireak Dara 76' (o.g.)	Report	Gabriel Silva 5'; Bounphachan 28'; Min Ratanak 56'

Gelora Joko Samudro Stadium, Gresik
Attendance: 829
Referee: Ahmed Issa (United Arab Emirates)

Svay Rieng won 6–3 on aggregate.

== Final ==
In the final, the winners of the each semi-finals played each other, with the host team alternating every season. The winners would be given a direct slot for the 2025–26 AFC Champions League Two group stage, if not already qualified through the domestic performance.

10 May 2025
19:00 UTC+7

Svay Rieng (Cambodia)	1–2 (a.e.t.)	(Turkmenistan) Arkadag
Krya 82'	Report	Saparow 59'; Annadurdyýew 112'

Morodok Techo National Stadium, Phnom Penh
Attendance: 51,610
Referee: Kim Hee-gon (South Korea)
