= 2024–25 AFC Challenge League group stage =

Asia tertiary club football tournament

The 2024–25 AFC Challenge League group stage was played from 26 October to 2 November 2024.

== Draw ==
The draw for the group stage took place on 22 August at the AFC House in Kuala Lumpur, Malaysia. The 18 teams were drawn into five groups: three comprising four teams from the West each (Groups A–C) and two involving three teams from the East each (Groups D–E). Teams were seeded into pots: four pots for West region and three pots for East region, and drawn into the relevant positions within each group, based on their association ranking. Teams from the same association could not be drawn into the same group.

The following 18 teams entered the group stage draw, which included the 14 direct entrants, two losers from the AFC Champions League Two qualifying play-offs (labeled ACL2) and the two winners of the preliminary stage (labeled PS).

Region	Groups	Pot 1	Pot 2	Pot 3	Pot 4
West Region	A–C	(India) East Bengal^{ACL2}	(Turkmenistan) Arkadag	(Bangladesh) Bashundhara Kings	(Palestine) Hilal Al-Quds
West Region	A–C	(Bahrain) Al-Ahli Club^{ACL2}	(Lebanon) Nejmeh	(Oman) Al-Seeb	(Kyrgyzstan) Abdysh-Ata Kant^{PS}
West Region	A–C	(Kuwait) Al-Arabi	(Syria) Al-Fotuwa	(Maldives) Maziya	(Bhutan) Paro^{PS}
East Region	D–E	(Indonesia) Madura United	(Cambodia) Svay Rieng	(Laos) Young Elephants	—
East Region	D–E	(Myanmar) Shan United	(Chinese Taipei) Tainan City	(Mongolia) SP Falcons	—

== Format ==
In the group stage, each group will be played in a single round-robin format on a centralised venue. Eight teams will progress to the quarter-finals of the knockout stage : the three group winners and best-ranked runners-up from the West, and the group winners and runner-ups of each group from the East.

=== Tiebreakers ===
The teams were ranked according to points (3 points for a win, 1 point for a draw, 0 points for a loss). If tied on points, tiebreakers were applied in the following order (Regulations Article 8.3):

1. Points in head-to-head matches among tied teams;
2. Goal difference in head-to-head matches among tied teams;
3. Goals scored in head-to-head matches among tied teams;
4. If more than two teams were tied, and after applying all head-to-head criteria above, a subset of teams were still tied, all head-to-head criteria above were reapplied exclusively to this subset of teams;
5. Goal difference in all group matches;
6. Goals scored in all group matches;
7. Penalty shoot-out if only two teams playing each other in the last round of the group are tied;
8. Disciplinary points (yellow card = 1 point, red card as a result of two yellow cards = 3 points, direct red card = 3 points, yellow card followed by direct red card = 4 points);
9. Drawing of lots.

== Schedule ==
The schedule of the group stage is as follows.

Round	Dates (West region)	Dates (East region)
Matchday 1	26 October 2024	27 October 2024
Matchday 2	29 October 2024	30 October 2024
Matchday 3	1 November 2024	2 November 2024

== Groups ==
The detailed schedule was announced on 22 August 2024 after the draw ceremony.

=== West Region ===
==== Group A ====
Pos	Team	Pld	W	D	L	GF	GA	GD	Pts	Qualification	EAB	NJM	PAR	BSK
1	(India) East Bengal	3	2	1	0	9	4	+5	7	Advance to Quarter-finals		3–2	2–2	
2	(Lebanon) Nejmeh	3	2	0	1	5	4	+1	6					1–0
3	(Bhutan) Paro (H)	3	1	1	1	5	5	0	4			1–2		
4	(Bangladesh) Bashundhara Kings	3	0	0	3	1	7	−6	0		0–4		1–2	

Source: AFC
Rules for classification: Group stage tiebreakers
(H) Hosts
26 October 2024
17:00 UTC+6

East Bengal (India)	2–2	(Bhutan) Paro
Talal 5'; Diamantakos 69'	Report	Opoku 8' (pen.); Asante 45+4'

Changlimithang Stadium, Thimphu
Attendance: 3,800
Referee: Mohammad Ghabayen (Jordan)
26 October 2024
21:00 UTC+6

Nejmeh (Lebanon)	1–0	(Bangladesh) Bashundhara Kings
Saad 49' (o.g.)	Report

Changlimithang Stadium, Thimphu
Attendance: 300
Referee: Jin Jingyuan (China)

29 October 2024
17:00 UTC+6

Paro (Bhutan)	1–2	(Lebanon) Nejmeh
Ivanović 90+6'	Report	Kourani 39'; Zein 87'

Changlimithang Stadium, Thimphu (Note: Paro played their home matches at Changlimithang Stadium, Thimphu, instead of their regular home stadium Woochu Sports Arena, Paro.)
Attendance: 1,700
Referee: Resul Mammedov (Turkmenistan)
29 October 2024
21:00 UTC+6

Bashundhara Kings (Bangladesh)	0–4	(India) East Bengal
	Report	Diamantakos 1'; Souvik 20'; Nandhakumar 26'; Anwar 33'

Changlimithang Stadium, Thimphu
Attendance: 200
Referee: Mohammad Deham (Bahrain)

1 November 2024
16:00 UTC+6

East Bengal (India)	3–2	(Lebanon) Nejmeh
Musah 8' (o.g.); Diamantakos 15', 77' (pen.)	Report	Opare 18'; Monzer 43'

Changlimithang Stadium, Thimphu
Attendance: 437
Referee: Songkran Bunmeekiart (Thailand)
1 November 2024
21:00 UTC+6

Bashundhara Kings (Bangladesh)	1–2	(Bhutan) Paro
Gryshyn 12'	Report	Wangdi 23'; Jumayev 55' (o.g.)

Changlimithang Stadium, Thimphu
Attendance: 869
Referee: Mohammad Mofeed Naser Ghabayen (Jordan)

==== Group B ====
Pos	Team	Pld	W	D	L	GF	GA	GD	Pts	Qualification	AKG	AAK	ABD	MAZ
1	(Turkmenistan) Arkadag	3	2	0	1	6	4	+2	6 (Note: Head-to-head goal difference: Arkadag +1; Al-Arabi 0; Abdysh-Ata Kant –1.)	Advance to Quarter-finals				2–1
2	(Kuwait) Al-Arabi (H)	3	2	0	1	5	3	+2	6	Advance to Quarter-finals	3–2		0–1	
3	(Kyrgyzstan) Abdysh-Ata Kant	3	2	0	1	4	2	+2	6		0–2			
4	(Maldives) Maziya	3	0	0	3	1	7	−6	0			0–2	0–3	

Source: AFC
Rules for classification: Group stage tiebreakers
(H) Hosts
Notes:
26 October 2024
17:30 UTC+3

Al Arabi (Kuwait)	0–1	(Kyrgyzstan) Abdysh-Ata Kant
	Report	Atabayev 62'

Al Kuwait Sports Club Stadium, Kuwait City
Attendance: 500
Referee: Hiroki Kasahara (Japan)
26 October 2024
21:30 UTC+3

Arkadag (Turkmenistan)	2–1	(Maldives) Maziya
Durdyýew 66'; Annadurdyýew 76'	Report	Cantillana 45'

Al Kuwait Sports Club Stadium, Kuwait City
Attendance: 20
Referee: Ramachandran Venkatesh (India)

29 October 2024
17:30 UTC+3

Abdysh-Ata Kant (Kyrgyzstan)	0–2	(Turkmenistan) Arkadag
	Report	Hydyrow 26'; Bäşimow 50'

Al Kuwait Sports Club Stadium, Kuwait City
Attendance: 80
Referee: Yahya Al Balushi (Oman)
29 October 2024
21:30 UTC+3

Maziya (Maldives)	0–2	(Kuwait) Al Arabi
	Report	Majed 7'; Khalaf 8'

Al Kuwait Sports Club Stadium, Kuwait City
Attendance: 350
Referee: Mohammed Kanah (Syria)

1 November 2024
17:30 UTC+3

Al Arabi (Kuwait)	3–2	(Turkmenistan) Arkadag
Khalaf 41'; Obud 49'; Khabba 70' (pen.)	Report	Akmämmedow 84', 90+7' (pen.)

Al Kuwait Sports Club Stadium, Kuwait City
Attendance: 720
Referee: Hiroki Kasahara (Japan)
1 November 2024
21:30 UTC+3

Maziya (Maldives)	0–3	(Kyrgyzstan) Abdysh-Ata Kant
	Report	Zhyrgalbek uulu 9'; Dzhumashev 64' (pen.); Yaghr 81'

Al Kuwait Sports Club Stadium, Kuwait City
Attendance: 150
Referee: Muath Owfi (Palestine)

==== Group C ====
Pos	Team	Pld	W	D	L	GF	GA	GD	Pts	Qualification	ASB	AAM	AFT	HAQ
1	(Oman) Al-Seeb (H)	3	3	0	0	9	0	+9	9	Advance to Quarter-finals		1–0		3–0
2	(Bahrain) Al-Ahli Club	3	0	2	1	1	2	−1	2 (Note: Head-to-head goals scored: Al-Ahli Club 1, Al-Fotuwa 1, Hilal Al-Quds 0; Overall goal difference: Al-Ahli Club –1, Al-Fotuwa –5.)				1–1	0–0
3	(Syria) Al-Fotuwa	3	0	2	1	1	6	−5	2		0–5			
4	(Palestine) Hilal Al-Quds	3	0	2	1	0	3	−3	2				0–0	

Source: AFC
Rules for classification: Group stage tiebreakers
(H) Hosts
Notes:
26 October 2024
17:00 UTC+4

Al-Ahli Club (Bahrain)	0–0	(Palestine) Hilal Al-Quds
	Report

Al-Seeb Stadium, Muscat
Attendance: 214
Referee: Tuan Mohd Yaasin (Malaysia)
26 October 2024
20:00 UTC+4

Al-Fotuwa (Syria)	0–5	(Oman) Al-Seeb
	Report	Al-Aghbari 32', 75'; Al-Busaidi 73'; Al-Muqbali 78'; Al-Yahmadi 87'

Al-Seeb Stadium, Muscat
Attendance: 2,224
Referee: Daniel Elder (Australia)

29 October 2024
17:00 UTC+4

Hilal Al-Quds (Palestine)	0–0	(Syria) Al-Fotuwa
	Report

Al-Seeb Stadium, Muscat
Attendance: 200
Referee: Sheikh Ahmad Alaeddin (Lebanon)
29 October 2024
20:00 UTC+4

Al-Seeb (Oman)	1–0	(Bahrain) Al-Ahli Club
Al-Farsi 22'	Report

Al-Seeb Stadium, Muscat
Attendance: 3,087
Referee: Abdulhadi Al Asmar Al Ruaile (Qatar)

1 November 2024
17:00 UTC+4

Al-Ahli Club (Bahrain)	1–1	(Syria) Al-Fotuwa
Al-Hashash 14'	Report	Al-Hasan 69'

Al-Seeb Stadium, Muscat
Attendance: 156
Referee: Asker Nadjafaliev (Uzbekistan)
1 November 2024
20:00 UTC+4

Al-Seeb (Oman)	3–0	(Palestine) Hilal Al-Quds
Al-Aghbari 44'; Al-Mushaifri 57'; Al-Muqbali 70' (pen.)	Report

Al-Seeb Stadium, Muscat
Attendance: 2,125
Referee: Tuan Mohd Yaasin (Malaysia)

==== Ranking of runners-up teams ====
Pos	Grp	Team	Pld	W	D	L	GF	GA	GD	Pts	Qualification
1	B	(Kuwait) Al-Arabi	3	2	0	1	5	3	+2	6	Advance to Quarter-finals
2	A	(Lebanon) Nejmeh	3	2	0	1	5	4	+1	6	
3	C	(Bahrain) Al-Ahli Club	3	0	2	1	1	2	−1	2	

Source: AFC

=== East Region ===
==== Group D ====
Pos	Team	Pld	W	D	L	GF	GA	GD	Pts	Qualification	SNU	TNC	YEP
1	(Myanmar) Shan United (H)	2	1	1	0	4	2	+2	4	Advance to Quarter-finals		2–2	
2	(Chinese Taipei) Tainan City	2	1	1	0	5	4	+1	4	Advance to Quarter-finals			3–2
3	(Laos) Young Elephants	2	0	0	2	2	5	−3	0		0–2		

Source: AFC
Rules for classification: Group stage tiebreakers
(H) Hosts
27 October 2024
16:00 UTC+6:30

Young Elephants (Laos)	0–2	(Myanmar) Shan United
	Report	Ye Yint Aung 12', 17'

Thuwunna Stadium, Yangon
Attendance: 970
Referee: Yudi Nurcahya (Indonesia)

30 October 2024
16:00 UTC+6:30

Tainan City (Chinese Taipei)	3–2	(Laos) Young Elephants
Cortés 25'; Kim Sung-Kyum 60'; Toninho 70'	Report	Brylian 48', 50'

Thuwunna Stadium, Yangon
Attendance: 263
Referee: Sinan Hussain (Maldives)

2 November 2024
16:00 UTC+6:30

Shan United (Myanmar)	2–2	(Chinese Taipei) Tainan City
Sa Aung Pyae Ko 42'; Ye Yint Aung 70'	Report	Matheus Porto 12'; Toninho 87'

Thuwunna Stadium, Yangon
Attendance: 650
Referee: Daiyrbek Abdyldaev (Kyrgyzstan)

==== Group E ====
Pos	Team	Pld	W	D	L	GF	GA	GD	Pts	Qualification	MDU	SVR	SPF
1	(Indonesia) Madura United	2	1	1	0	2	1	+1	4	Advance to Quarter-finals		2–1	
2	(Cambodia) Svay Rieng	2	1	0	1	3	3	0	3	Advance to Quarter-finals			2–1
3	(Mongolia) SP Falcons (H)	2	0	1	1	1	2	−1	1		0–0		

Source: AFC
Rules for classification: Group stage tiebreakers
(H) Hosts
27 October 2024
15:00 UTC+8

SP Falcons (Mongolia)	0–0	(Indonesia) Madura United
	Report

MFF Football Centre, Ulaanbaatar
Attendance: 1,069
Referee: Choi Hyun-jai (South Korea)

30 October 2024
15:00 UTC+8

Svay Rieng (Cambodia)	2–1	(Mongolia) SP Falcons
Pablo 25' (pen.); Cristian Roque 80' (pen.)	Report	Musatkin 67'

MFF Football Centre, Ulaanbaatar
Attendance: 629
Referee: Wai Lun Wong (Hong Kong)

2 November 2024
15:00 UTC+8

Madura United (Indonesia)	2–1	(Cambodia) Svay Rieng
Maxuel 12'; Mizuno 39' (o.g.)	Report	Ratanak 29' (pen.)

MFF Football Centre, Ulaanbaatar
Attendance: 83
Referee: Amir Arab Baraghi (Iran)
