= Didar Hajyýew =

Former Turkmenistani footballer

Personal information
- Date of birth: December 1, 1980 (age 45)
- Place of birth: Bagyr, Turkmen SSR, Soviet Union
- Position: Midfielder

Senior career*
Years	Team	Apps	(Gls)
–2002	Köpetdag Aşgabat		
2003	Nisa Aşgabat		
2004	Akzhayik	12	(1)
2005–2009	Navbahor	78	(12)
2010	Nasaf	4	(0)
2011–2021	Ahal		

International career
2003–2008	Turkmenistan	13	(0)
- * Club domestic league appearances and goals

Didar Hajyýew (born December 1, 1980) is a Turkmen former professional footballer who played as a midfielder. He played for Köpetdag Aşgabat, Nisa Aşgabat, Akzhayik, Navbahor, Nasaf, Ahal, and the Turkmenistan national team. He also coached FK Arkadag in the 2024–25 AFC Challenge League.
