= Güýçmyrat Annagulyýew =

Turkmen footballer

Personal information
- Full name: Guychmyrat Dovletgeldiyevich Annaguliyev
- Date of birth: 10 June 1996 (age 30)
- Place of birth: Balkanabat, Turkmenistan
- Height: 1.88 m (6 ft 2 in)
- Position: Defender

Team information
- Current team: FK Arkadag
- Number: 2

Senior career*
Years	Team	Apps	(Gls)
2013	Nebitçi FT		
2018	Ahal		
2019	Aşgabat		
2020	Ahal	23	(1)
2021-2022	Altyn Asyr	15	(0)
2023–	FK Arkadag	17	(2)

International career^{‡}
2018–	Turkmenistan	16	(2)
- * Club domestic league appearances and goals as of 2 February 2020 ‡ National team caps and goals as of 9 June 2021

Guychmyrat Dovletgeldiyevich Annaguliyev or Güýçmyrat Döwletgeldiýewiç Annagulyýew (born 10 June 1996) is a Turkmen professional footballer who plays as defender for Turkmen club FK Arkadag and the Turkmenistan national team.

== Club career ==
Annagulyýew joined Altyn Asyr in April 2021.

== International career ==
Annagulyýew made his senior debut for Turkmenistan against Afghanistan, where he also scored his first international goal. He was included in Turkmenistan's squad for the 2019 AFC Asian Cup in the United Arab Emirates.

== Career statistics ==
=== International ===
Statistics accurate as of match played 9 June 2021

National team	Year	Apps	Goals
Turkmenistan	2018	1	1
Turkmenistan	2019	4	0
Turkmenistan	2021	2	1
Total		7	2

==== International goals ====
Scores and results list Turkmenistan's goal tally first.

No.	Date	Venue	Opponent	Score	Result	Competition
1.	25 December 2018	Miracle Resort Hotel Training Center - Stadium, Antalya, Turkey	Afghanistan	2–0	2–0	Friendly
2.	9 June 2021	Goyang Stadium, Goyang, South Korea	Lebanon	2–2	3–2	2022 FIFA World Cup qualification

== Honours ==
FK Arkadag

- AFC Challenge League: 2024–25

=== State medals ===
- Medal For the love of the Fatherland (2025)
