= Rasul Çaryýew =

Turkmen footballer

Personal information
- Full name: Rasul Maksatowiç Çaryýew
- Date of birth: 30 September 1999 (age 27)
- Place of birth: Ashgabat, Turkmenistan
- Height: 1.87 m (6 ft 2 in)
- Position: Goalkeeper

Team information
- Current team: FK Arkadag
- Number: 1

Senior career*
Years	Team	Apps	(Gls)
2019–2020	Köpetdag Aşgabat	27	(0)
2020–2023	Ahal	20	(0)
2023–	FK Arkadag	22	(0)

International career
2021–	Turkmenistan	8	(0)
- * Club domestic league appearances and goals

Rasul Maksatowiç Çaryýew (born on 30 September 1999) is a Turkmen professional footballer who plays as a goalkeeper for FK Arkadag and the Turkmenistan national team.

== International career ==
Çaryýew debuted internationally on 5 June 2021, against South Korea in a 5–0 defeat.

== Honours ==
FK Arkadag

- AFC Challenge League: 2024–25

=== State medals ===
- Medal For the love of the Fatherland (2025)
