= Boris Grigorýanc =

Turkmenistan football manager

Boris Grigoryants
Personal information
- Date of birth: 1 January 1953
- Place of birth: Ashgabat, Soviet Union
- Date of death: 2 November 2016 (aged 63)
- Place of death: Ashgabat, Turkmenistan

Managerial career
- Years: Team
- 2005: Turkmenistan
- 2008–2009: FK Aşgabat
- 2009–2010: Turkmenistan
- 2015–2016: FC Ahal

Boris Grigoryants (Russian: Борис Григорьянц) was a Turkmen football manager.

== National team ==
When a manager, Turkmenistan qualified for the 2010 AFC Challenge Cup, winning all three consecutive matches.

He was replaced by young coach Yazguly Hojageldiyev in 2010.

== FK Asgabat ==
During his 1-year tenure with FK Aşgabat, he routed Sri Lanka Army SC 5-1, topping their AFC President's Cup group before being subdued 2-1 by FC Dordoi Bishkek in the semi-final.

He died November 2, 2016.
