= Abdy Bäşimow =

Turkmen footballer

Abdy Bashimov
Personal information
- Full name: Abdy Azimowiç Bäşimow
- Date of birth: 12 December 1995 (age 30)
- Place of birth: Aşgabat, Turkmenistan
- Position: Defender

Team information
- Current team: FK Arkadag
- Number: 5

Senior career*
Years	Team	Apps	(Gls)
2018–2019	Ahal	10	(1)
2020	Qizilqum	7	(0)
2021–2022	Ahal	16	(0)
2023–	FK Arkadag	15	(0)

International career
2014–	Turkmenistan	15	(1)
- * Club domestic league appearances and goals

Abdy Azimovich Bashimov (Turkmen: Abdy Azimowiç Bäşimow; born 12 December 1995) is a Turkmen professional footballer currently playing for FK Arkadag in Ýokary Liga. He was part of the Turkmenistan national team from 2019.

== Club career ==
In recent years he has been playing for the FC Ahal.

In February 2020, he signed a contract with the Uzbek club FC Qizilqum Zarafshon. On 1 March 2020, Bashimov made his debut in the Uzbekistan Super League in a 1–3 loss against Nasaf. In August 2020 he left the club.

On 30 March 2021, it was announced that Bäşimow signed a deal with FC Ahal, moving on a free transfer.

== International career ==
He played for Turkmenistan futsal team at 2017 Asian Indoor and Martial Arts Games.

Bashimov made his senior national team debut on 10 October 2019, in a 2022 FIFA World Cup qualification match against Lebanon.

=== International goals ===
Scores and results Turkmenistan's goal tally first.

No.	Date	Venue	Opponent	Score	Result	Competition
1.	19 November 2019	Köpetdag Stadium, Ashgabat, Turkmenistan	Sri Lanka	1–0	2–0	2022 FIFA World Cup qualification

== Honours ==
FK Arkadag

- AFC Challenge League: 2024–25
