= Turkmenistan national football team =

Men's association football team

Turkmenistan
- Nickname: Karakum Warriors
- Association: Türkmenistanyň Futbol Federasiýasy (TFF)
- Confederation: AFC (Asia)
- Sub-confederation: CAFA (Central Asia)
- Head coach: Rovshen Meredov
- Captain: Mekan Saparow
- Most caps: Arslanmyrat Amanow (63)
- Top scorer: Wladimir Baýramow (16)
- Home stadium: Ashgabat Stadium
- FIFA code: TKM
First colours	Second colours

FIFA ranking
- Current: 139 ▲2 (7 October 2026)
- Highest: 86 (April 2004)
- Lowest: 174 (September 2007)

First international
- Kazakhstan 1–0 Turkmenistan (Almaty, Kazakhstan; 1 June 1992)

Biggest win
- Turkmenistan 11–0 Afghanistan (Ashgabat, Turkmenistan; 19 November 2003)

Biggest defeat
- Tajikistan 5–0 Turkmenistan (Dushanbe, Tajikistan; 22 June 1997); Kuwait 6–1 Turkmenistan (Kuwait City, Kuwait; 10 February 2000); Qatar 5–0 Turkmenistan (Doha, Qatar; 31 May 2004); Bahrain 5–0 Turkmenistan (Riffa, Bahrain; 3 August 2005); South Korea 5–0 Turkmenistan (Goyang, South Korea; 5 June 2021); Iran 5–0 Turkmenistan (Tehran, Iran; 21 March 2024)

Asian Cup
- Appearances: 2 (first in 2004)
- Best result: Group stage (2004, 2019)

CAFA Nations Cup
- Appearances: 2 (first in 2023)
- Best result: Group stage (2023)

AFC Challenge Cup
- Appearances: 4 (first in 2008)
- Best result: Runners-up (2010, 2012)

The Turkmenistan national football team (Turkmen: Türkmenistanyň milli futbol ýygyndysy) represents Turkmenistan in men's international football. It is controlled by the Football Federation of Turkmenistan, the governing body for football in Turkmenistan. Turkmenistan's home ground is the Kopetdag Stadium and their head coach is Rovshen Meredov. The team represents FIFA and Asian Football Confederation (AFC).

== History ==
After the country gained independence, they played their first match against Kazakhstan on 1 June 1992, and against fellow Central Asian nation Uzbekistan on 28 June the same year.

=== 2000s ===
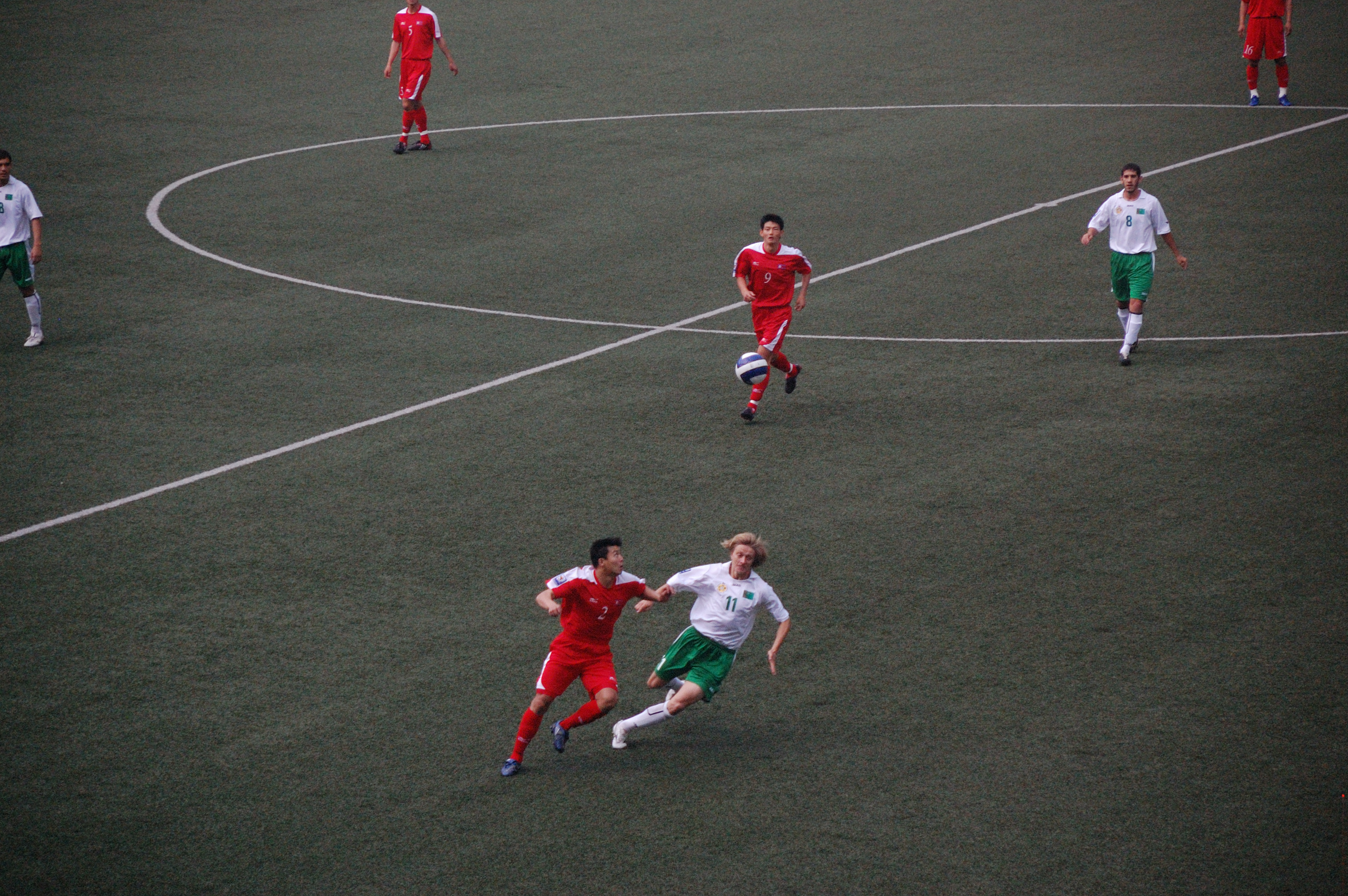
Turkmenistan match against North Korea in June 2008

They qualified for the 2004 AFC Asian Cup by winning the 2004 AFC Asian Cup qualification, where they were placed in group G, alongside the United Arab Emirates, Syria and Sri Lanka. In the autumn of 2003, in the first leg of the 2006 FIFA World Cup qualification, they defeated Afghanistan 11–0 in Ashgabat. Begench Kuliyev and Rejepmyrat Agabaýew each scored a hat-trick, while Guvanchmuhammet Ovekov scored twice. Other players on the scoresheet that day were Nazar Bayramov, Omar Berdiyev and Didarklych Urazov. In the second leg the team won 0–2, with both goals scored by Begench Kuliyev. In December 2003, the national team of Turkmenistan reached the top 100 in the FIFA rankings for the first time in its history, reaching the 99th position, thanks to the successes in the 2004 AFC Asian Cup and the 2006 FIFA World Cup qualifiers. In the 2004 AFC Asian Cup that took place in China, Turkmenistan was placed in group C, with neighbours Uzbekistan, Saudi Arabia and Iraq. They were knocked out in the group stages following two defeats and a draw against Saudi Arabia.

=== 2010s ===
In February 2010, Turkmenistan's national football team was coach by Ýazguly Hojageldyýew, who was working for HTTU Aşgabat. Under his leadership the team went to Sri Lanka to participate in the 2010 AFC Challenge Cup. For the first time, they made it to the final, only to see them lose against North Korea in the penalty shootout. In the same year, the Football Association of Turkmenistan invited a native Turkmen, the head coach of FC Rubin Kazan, Kurban Berdyev to resume leadership.

In March 2011, Turkmenistan successfully entered the final round of the 2012 AFC Challenge Cup, beating Pakistan, Taiwan, and played in a draw with India in the qualifying competition in Kuala Lumpur. In the summer of 2011, in the race for a spot at the 2014 FIFA World Cup in Brazil, they faced Indonesia in the second round. After managing a 1–1 draw in the first leg in Ashghabat, they were eventually defeated 4–3 in the second leg, 5–4 on aggregate, thus were knocked out of the contention for qualifying to the 2014 FIFA World Cup.

In winter 2012 the team gathered for a training camp in Turkey. In preparation for the 2012 AFC Challenge Cup, Ýazguly Hojageldyýew arranged a friendly match with Romania, which they lost 4–0.

In March 2012, the team went to Kathmandu to participate in the final tournament of the 2012 AFC Challenge Cup. They beat the hosts Nepal 3–0 and the Maldives 3–1, while the final group stage match with Palestine ended in a goalless draw. In the semifinals, Turkmenistan defeated the Philippines 2–1. However, as in the previous edition, they lost the final match to North Korea with a scoreline of 1–2.

In October 2012, Turkmenistan's were invited to the 2012 VFF Cup held in Ho Chi Minh City and finished as runners-up in the tournament, beating the teams of Vietnam and Laos, only to lose in the final match against the South Korean University Selection team 0–4.

On 23 March 2013, Turkmenistan defeated Cambodia 7–0 in Manila, in the qualifying round of the 2014 AFC Challenge Cup. In the second round, Turkmenistan was to meet Brunei, but the team did not arrive at the tournament, thus Turkmenistan was awarded a default 3–0 victory. In the last round, Turkmenistan lost to Philippines 1–0, but managed to qualify for the 2014 AFC Challenge Cup finals as the best second placed team alongside Laos.

In January 2014 Rahym Kurbanmämmedow was again in charge of the national team. They held three training camps in May and participated in the 2014 AFC Challenge Cup, where they were eliminated in the group stage, thereby losing the chance to qualify for the 2015 AFC Asian Cup. In June 2014, as a result of their poor performance at the AFC Challenge Cup, the entire coaching staff was dismissed, including the head coach.

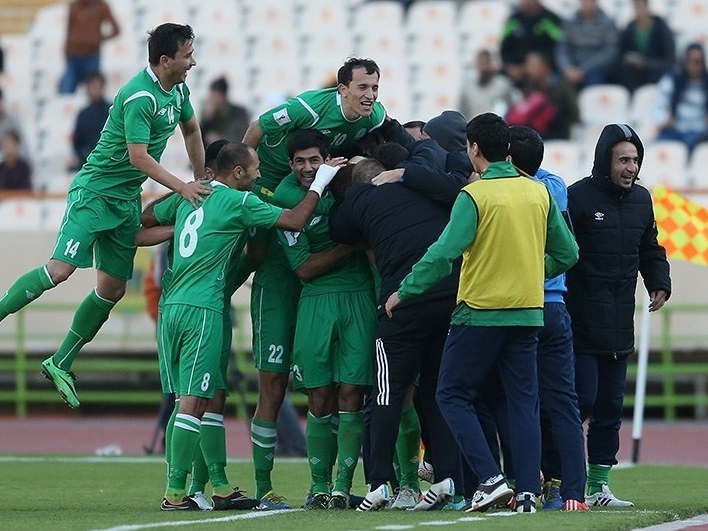
2018 FIFA World Cup qualification match against Iran in Tehran

In the spring of 2015, Amangylyç Koçumow was appointed as the new head coach of the national team to prepare the team for participation in 2018 FIFA World Cup qualification. The team started off badly, losing to one of the weakest teams in Asia – Guam national football team 0–1. On 16 June 2015, for the first time, the Turkmenistan national team held a match outside Ashgabat, at the Spot toplumy Stadium in Dashoguz in the presence of 10,000 spectators, the Turkmenistan team played a draw with Iran (1–1). Then, the team lost Oman 1:3. In the home games that took place at the Kopetdag Stadium in October 2016, Turkmenistan beat India 2–1 and Guam 1–0. In November, the Turkmenistan held a friendly match with the UAE, which ended in a 1–5 defeat and an official match with Iran, in which the team lost 1–3. On 17 November 2016, the national team of Turkmenistan in the home game sensationally beat the national team of Oman 2–1. In the final stage, the Turkmenistan national team defeated India 2–1. The Turkmenistan team took the 3rd place in Group D, which did not allow the team to go to the next stage of the qualifying games for the 2018 World Cup, but gave the opportunity to fight for getting into the 2019 AFC Asian Cup.

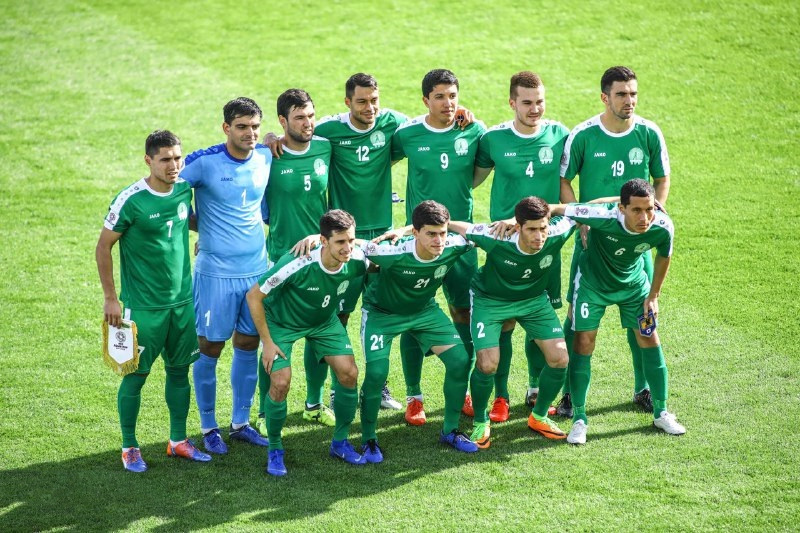
Turkmenistan in the 2019 AFC Asian Cup

=== Back to the AFC Asian Cup ===
Turkmenistan had finally qualified to the 2019 AFC Asian Cup for the second time in history, having finished second after Bahrain. In the tournament, Turkmenistan was grouped with Japan, neighbor Uzbekistan and Oman. The Turkmen side played pretty well in their first match against Asian powerhouse Japan and even took a lead until the end of the first half, but eventually fell to Japan 2–3. The next match against Uzbekistan was a complete disaster when Turkmenistan decided to play duel with more experienced Uzbekistan, leaving the team defeated 0–4, all four goals were scored in the first half. Turkmenistan then tried to make a fight against Oman, but lost 1–3 with two Omani goals scored in final minutes, thus the team was eliminated without scoring any point. Coach Ýazguly Hojageldyýew resigned in the aftermath of the tournament.

In March 2019, the Football Federation of Turkmenistan named Croatian Ante Miše as the head coach of the Turkmenistan, signing a one-year contract. Another croatian specialist, Sandro Tomić will help to train the national team of Turkmenistan. Croatian coaches are set to develop the overall football in Turkmenistan, not just the national team. His first game, 3 month later, was a 0–0 draw at friendly match with Uganda.

In the 2023 AFC Asian Cup qualification, Turkmenistan was then grouped with host Malaysia, Bahrain and Bangladesh. They would go on to lose against Malaysia (1–3) and Bahrain (1–0), and despite winning against Bangladesh (1–2), Turkmenistan did not manage to qualify to the 2023 AFC Asian Cup. In 2023, Turkmenistan participated in the inaugural 2023 CAFA Nations Cup held in Kyrgyzstan and Uzbekistan.

In November, they lost to Uzbekistan 1–3 and drew 2–2 against Hong Kong during the 2026 FIFA World Cup and 2027 AFC Asian Cup qualification.

== Team image ==
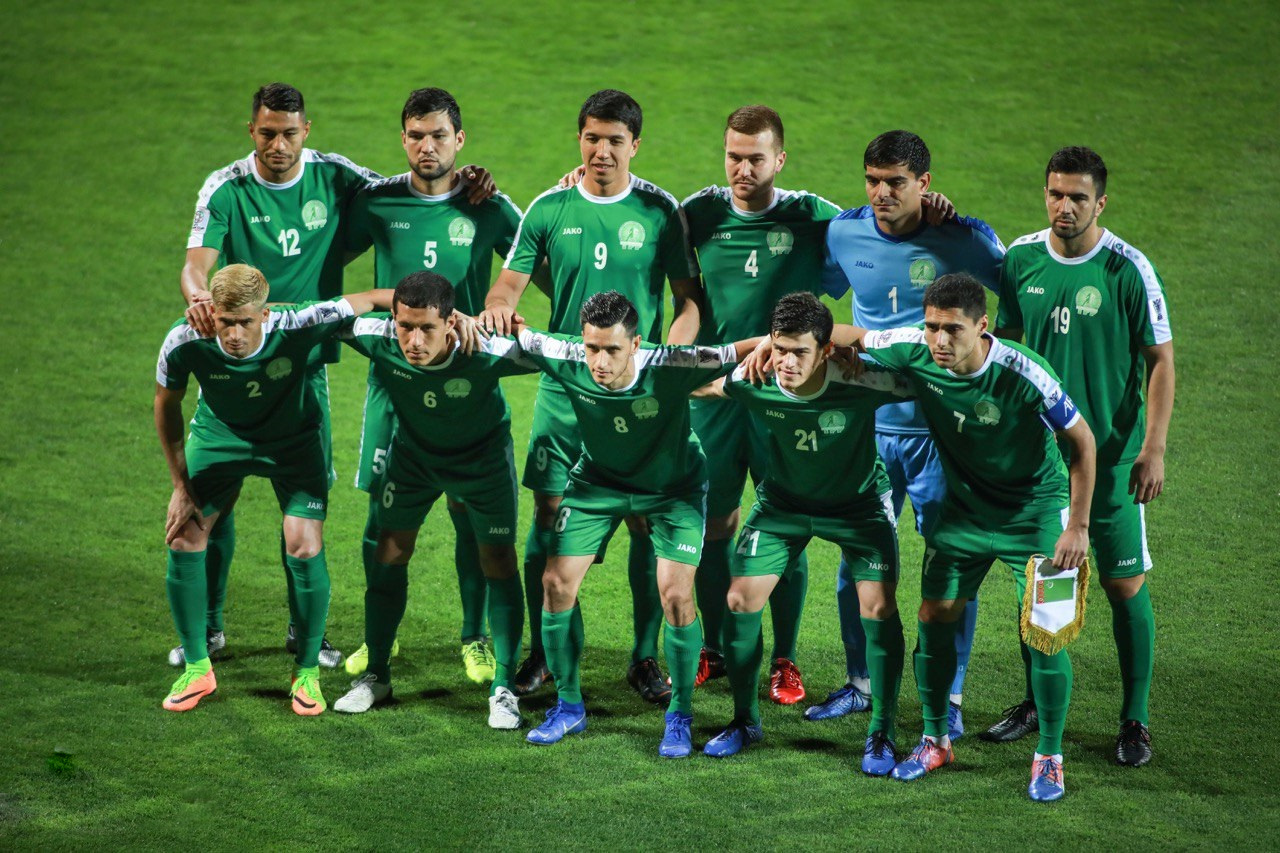
The national football team of Turkmenistan in the green home kit

=== Kit ===
Years	Suppliers
1992–2002	(Germany) Adidas
2002–2007	(United States) Nike
2007–2008	(Germany) Jako
2009–2010	(Turkmenistan) 2X
2010–2011	(Germany) Adidas
2012–2016	(United Kingdom) Umbro
2016–2018	(Spain) Joma
2019–2023	(Germany) Jako
2023–2024	(Denmark) Hummel
2024–present	(Spain) Kelme

=== Home stadium ===
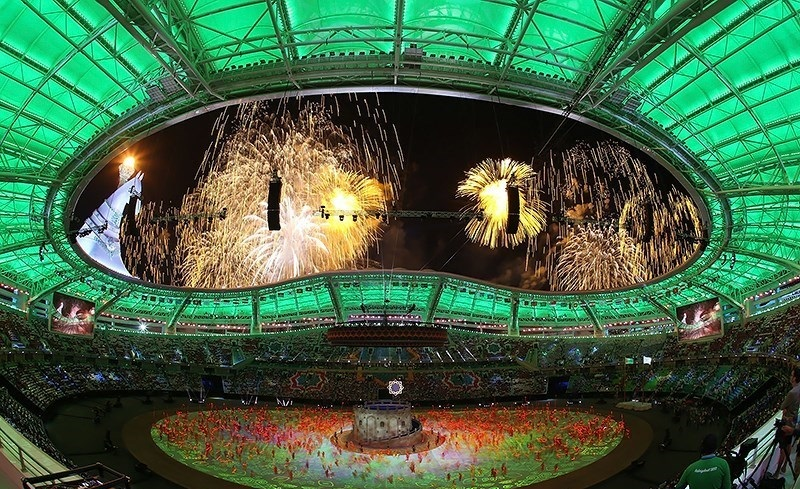
Ashgabat Olympic Stadium

From the moment of its formation (1992) until now, the main home stadium of the Turkmenistan national football team is the Köpetdag Stadium in Ashgabat, built and opened in 1997. This stadium is also the venue for home matches of FK Köpetdag Aşgabat. It was reconstructed in 2015 and currently holds 26,503 spectators.

From 2003 until the end of 2012, the main home stadium of the Turkmenistan national team was the Ashgabat Olympic Stadium (until 2017 was named Olympic Stadium named after Saparmurat Turkmenbashi the Great), renovated 2013–2017 and accommodating 45,000 spectators. At the moment, the national team is not used for football matches.[unclear]

The national team of Turkmenistan in different years held their home matches also in other cities and stadiums of Turkmenistan. So, at the Nisa Stadium in Ashgabat (matches vs China, Vietnam and Tajikistan in May 1997), at the Sport Toplumy in Dashoguz (Match vs Iran in 2015 and vs Bahrain in 2017), at the Sport Toplumy in Balkanabat (Match vs Taipei in 2017).

Turkmenistan national football team home stadiums
Image	Stadium	Capacity	Location	Last match
	Ashgabat Olympic Stadium	45,000	Ashgabat	v Indonesia (23 July 2011; 2014 FIFA World Cup qualification (AFC))
	Köpetdag Stadium	26,503	Ashgabat	v Sri Lanka (19 November 2019; 2022 FIFA World Cup qualification (AFC) )
	Ashgabat Stadium	20,000	Ashgabat	v Thailand (10 June 2025; 2027 AFC Asian Cup qualification – third round)
	Dashoguz Sport Toplumy	10,000	Daşoguz	v Bahrain (13 June 2017; 2019 AFC Asian Cup qualification – third round)
	Balkanabat Sport Toplumy	10,000	Balkanabat	v Chinese Taipei (14 November 2017; 2019 AFC Asian Cup qualification – third round)
	Nusaý Stadium	3,000	Ashgabat	v Tajikistan (25 May 1997; 1998 FIFA World Cup qualification (AFC))

=== Rivalries ===
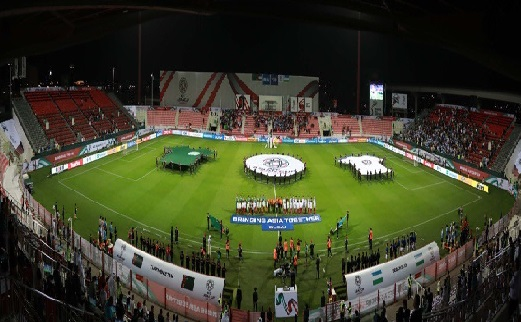
Match with Uzbekistan team in the 2019 Asian Cup in UAE

The main rivals of the Turkmenistan national team are the countries of Central Asia, the national teams of Kazakhstan, Tajikistan, Uzbekistan and Kyrgyzstan. The main and most important rival of the national team of Turkmenistan are the national teams of Uzbekistan and Tajikistan. The matches between the countries of Central Asia have always aroused great interest among fans of Central Asia. Football is one of the instruments of rivalry between the states of Central Asia.

== Results and fixtures ==
The following is a list of match results in the last 12 months, as well as any future matches that have been scheduled.

Win Draw Loss Fixture

=== 2026 ===
31 March 2027 AFC Asian Cup Q	Thailand	2–1	Turkmenistan	Bangkok, Thailand
19:30 UTC+7	Suphanan 14'; Bihr 89'	Report; Report (AFC)	Çaryýew 60'	Stadium: Rajamangala Stadium; Attendance: 37,373; Referee: Shen Yinhao (China)

== Coaching staff ==
Position	Name
Head coach	(Turkmenistan) Rovshen Meredov
Assistant coach	(Turkmenistan) Maksim Belyh
Goalkeeper coach	(Turkmenistan) Begençguly Ýusupow
General Secrertary	(Turkmenistan) Serdar Geldiyev

=== Coaching history ===
- (Turkmenistan) Baýram Durdyýew (1992–1996)
- (Georgia (country)) Elguja Gugushvili (1996–1997)
- (Turkmenistan) Täçmyrat Agamyradow (1997–1998)
- (Ukraine) Viktor Pozhechevskyi (1998–1999)
- (Russia) (Turkmenistan) Gurban Berdyýew (1999)
- (Turkmenistan) Röwşen Muhadow (1999–2000)
- (Turkmenistan) Täçmyrat Agamyradow (2000–2001)
- (Ukraine) Volodymyr Bezsonov (2002–2003)
- (Turkmenistan) Rahym Gurbanmämmedow (2003–2004)
- (Turkmenistan) Boris Grigorýanc (2005)
- (Turkmenistan) Amangylyç Goçumow (2005–2006)
- (Turkmenistan) Rahym Gurbanmämmedow (2007–2009)
- (Turkmenistan) Boris Grigorýanc (2009–2010)
- (Turkmenistan) Ýazguly Hojageldyýew (2010–2014)
- (Turkmenistan) Rahym Gurbanmämmedow (2014)
- (Turkmenistan) Amangylyç Koçumow (2015–2016)
- (Turkmenistan) Ýazguly Hojageldyýew (2017–2019)
- (Croatia) Ante Miše (2019–2020)
- (Turkmenistan) Röwşen Muhadow (2021)
- (Turkmenistan) Ýazguly Hojageldyýew (2021)
- (Turkmenistan) Said Seýidow (2022)
- (Turkmenistan) Ýazguly Hojageldyýew (2022)
- (Turkmenistan) Mergen Orazow (2023–2025)
- (Turkmenistan) Rovshen Meredov (2025–present)

== Players ==
=== Current squad ===
The following 23 players were named in the squad for the friendlies & 2027 AFC Asian Cup qualification against Laos and Thailand on 26–31 Match 2026.

Caps and goals correct as of 18 November 2025, after the match against Chinese Taipei.

No.	Pos.	Player	Date of birth (age)	Caps	Goals	Club
1	GK	Rasul Çaryýew	30 September 1999 (age 27)	8	0	(Football Federation of Turkmenistan) Arkadag
17	GK	Rüstem Ahallyýew	16 November 2002 (age 24)	4	0	(Football Federation of Turkmenistan) Arkadag
20	GK	Kakageldi Berdiýew	24 February 2004 (age 22)	0	0	(Football Federation of Turkmenistan) Ahal
2	DF	Zafar Babajanow	9 February 1987 (age 39)	12	1	(Football Federation of Turkmenistan) Altyn Asyr
3	DF	Güýçmyrat Annagulyýew	10 June 1996 (age 30)	21	2	(Football Federation of Turkmenistan) Arkadag
4	DF	Mekan Saparow (captain)	22 April 1994 (age 32)	34	2	(Football Federation of Turkmenistan) Altyn Asyr
5	DF	Abdy Bäşimow	12 December 1995 (age 30)	20	1	(Football Federation of Turkmenistan) Arkadag
23	DF	Arzuwguly Sapargulýyew	27 July 2001 (age 25)	1	0	(Football Federation of Turkmenistan) Arkadag
7	MF	Ahmet Ataýew	19 September 1990 (age 36)	37	1	(Football Federation of Turkmenistan) Arkadag
16	MF	Teýmur Çaryýew	26 November 2000 (age 25)	10	1	(Kyrgyz Football Union) Bars Issyk-Kul
18	MF	Mirza Beknazarow	15 May 2000 (age 26)	7	0	(Football Federation of Turkmenistan) Arkadag
19	MF	Welmyrat Ballakow	4 April 1999 (age 27)	11	0	(Football Federation of Turkmenistan) Arkadag
6	FW	Meýlis Diniýew	11 July 2000 (age 26)	3	0	(Football Federation of Turkmenistan) Ahal
8	FW	Ýazgylyç Gurbanow	7 March 1997 (age 29)	7	1	(Football Federation of Turkmenistan) Arkadag
9	FW	Altymyrat Annadurdyýew	13 April 1993 (age 33)	35	9	(Football Federation of Turkmenistan) Arkadag
	FW	Begenç Akmämmedow	1 June 1998 (age 28)	6	0	(Football Federation of Turkmenistan) Altyn Asyr
11	FW	Didar Durdyýew	16 July 1993 (age 33)	21	3	(Football Federation of Turkmenistan) Arkadag

=== Recent call-ups ===
The following players have also been called up to the Turkmenistan squad within the last twelve months.

Pos.	Player	Date of birth (age)	Caps	Goals	Club	Latest call-up
Notes: ^{INJ} = Withdrew due to injury; ^{PRE} = Preliminary squad / standby; ^{RET} = Retired from the national team; ^{SUS} = Serving suspension; ^{WD} = Player withdrew from the squad due to non-injury issue.

== Player records ==
As of 18 November 2025.
Players in bold are still active with Turkmenistan.

=== Most appearances ===
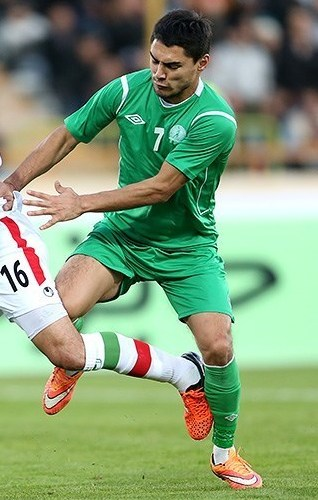
Arslanmyrat Amanow is Turkmenistan's most capped player with 63 appearances.

Rank	Player	Caps	Goals	Career
1	Arslanmyrat Amanow	63	14	2009–2024
2	**Altymyrat Annadurdyýew**	42	9	2015–present
3	**Ahmet Ataýew**	40	1	2012–present
3	Bahtiýar Hojaahmedow	40	1	2008–2017
3	Kamil Mingazow	40	3	1992–2004
6	Serdar Annaorazow	39	0	2012–2019
6	Omar Berdiýew	39	1	2000–2010
6	Begençmuhammet Kulyýew	39	11	1997–2006
9	**Mekan Saparow**	38	3	2014–present
10	Gurbangeldi Durdyýew	36	2	1992–2004

=== Top goalscorers ===
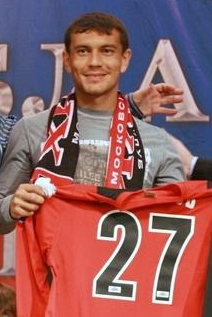
Wladimir Baýramow is Turkmenistan's top scorer with 16 goals.

Rank	Player	Goals	Caps	Ratio	Career
1	Wladimir Baýramow	16	35	0.46	2000–2013
2	Arslanmyrat Amanow	14	63	0.22	2009–2024
3	Çaryýar Muhadow	13	18	0.72	1992–2000
4	Rejepmyrat Agabaýew	12	30	0.4	1994–2004
5	Begençmuhammet Kulyýew	11	39	0.28	2000–2013
6	Berdymyrat Şamyradow	10	24	0.42	2008–2015
7	Guwançmuhammet Öwekow	9	23	0.39	2003–2010
7	Muslim Agaýew	9	25	0.36	1994–2007
7	**Altymyrat Annadurdyýew**	9	42	0.21	2015–present
10	Didargylyç Urazow	6	18	0.33	1996–2003
10	Mämmedaly Garadanow	6	22	0.27	2004–2011
10	**Elman Tagaýew**	6	23	0.26	2012–present
10	Ruslan Mingazow	6	30	0.2	2009–2023

== Competitive record ==
=== FIFA World Cup ===
FIFA World Cup record									Qualification record					
Year	Round	Position	Pld	W	D*	L	GF	GA	Pld	W	D	L	GF	GA
1930 to 1990	Part of Soviet Union								Part of Soviet Union					
(United States) 1994	Not a FIFA member								Not a FIFA member					
(France) 1998	Did not qualify								6	2	0	4	8	13
(South Korea) (Japan) 2002	Did not qualify								6	4	0	2	12	7
(Germany) 2006	Did not qualify								8	4	1	3	21	10
(South Africa) 2010	Did not qualify								10	3	2	5	9	13
(Brazil) 2014	Did not qualify								2	0	1	1	4	5
(Russia) 2018	Did not qualify								8	4	1	3	10	11
(Qatar) 2022	Did not qualify								6	3	0	3	8	11
(Canada) (Mexico) (United States) 2026	Did not qualify								6	0	2	4	4	14
(Morocco) (Portugal) (Spain) 2030	To be determined								To be determined					
(Saudi Arabia) 2034	To be determined								To be determined					
Total	–	0/8	–	–	–	–	–	–	52	20	7	25	76	84

=== AFC Asian Cup ===
AFC Asian Cup record									AFC Asian Cup qualification record					
Year	Result	Position	Pld	W	D	L	GF	GA	Pld	W	D	L	GF	GA
(Hong Kong) 1956 to (Qatar) 1988	Part of Soviet Union								Part of Soviet Union					
(Japan) 1992	Not an AFC member								Not an AFC member					
(United Arab Emirates) 1996	Did not qualify								4	0	1	3	3	8
(Lebanon) 2000	Did not qualify								4	3	0	1	15	6
(China) 2004	Round 1	12th	3	0	1	2	4	6	6	4	2	0	10	2
(Indonesia) (Malaysia) (Thailand) (Vietnam) 2007	Did not enter								Did not enter					
(Qatar) 2011	Did not qualify								AFC Challenge Cup					
(Australia) 2015	Did not qualify								AFC Challenge Cup					
(United Arab Emirates) 2019	Group stage	21st	3	0	0	3	3	10	14	7	2	5	19	21
(Qatar) 2023	Did not qualify								9	4	0	5	11	16
(Saudi Arabia) 2027	Did not qualify								12	4	2	6	15	21
Total	Best: Group stage	2/18	6	0	1	5	7	16	49	22	7	20	73	74

- 2010 AFC Challenge Cup was used to determine qualification for the 2011 AFC Asian Cup qualification.

=== Asian Games ===
Asian Games record
Year	Result	Pld	W	D*	L	GF	GA
National team
(Japan) Hiroshima 1994	Quarter-finals	5	1	3	1	7	9
(Thailand) Bangkok 1998	Quarter-finals	6	3	2	1	10	9
Total	Best: Quarter-finals	11	4	5	2	17	18

Note: as of 2002, only U23 teams are allowed to participate in the Asian Games' football tournament.

=== AFC Challenge Cup ===
AFC Challenge Cup record
Year	Result	Pld	W	D	L	GF	GA
(Bangladesh) 2006	Did not enter						
(India) 2008	Group stage	3	1	1	1	6	2
(Sri Lanka) 2010	Runners-up	5	3	2	0	6	2
(Nepal) 2012	Runners-up	5	3	1	1	9	4
(Maldives) 2014	Group stage	3	1	0	2	6	6
Total	Best: Runners-up	16	8	4	4	27	14

=== CAFA Nations Cup ===
CAFA Nations Cup record
Year	Result	Pld	W	D	L	GF	GA
(Kyrgyzstan) (Uzbekistan) 2023	Group stage	3	0	1	2	1	5
Total	Best: Group stage	3	0	1	2	1	5

=== RCD Cup/ECO Cup ===
Year	Round	Pld	W	D	L	GF	GA
(Iran) 1965 to (Turkey) 1974	No international team						
(Iran) 1993	Runners-up	4	2	0	2	6	5
Total	Best: Runners-up	4	2	0	2	6	5

== Head-to-head record ==
The list shown below shows the Turkmenistan national football team all-time international record against opposing nations.

As of 31 March 2026

Team	Pld	W	D	L	GF	GA	GD	Confederation
Afghanistan	5	4	0	1	21	3	+18	AFC
Armenia	1	0	0	1	0	1	-1	UEFA
Azerbaijan	2	1	0	1	2	3	-1	UEFA
Bangladesh	1	1	0	0	2	1	+1	AFC
Bahrain	6	0	2	4	4	15	-11	AFC
Bhutan	2	2	0	0	15	0	+15	AFC
Brunei^{a}	1	1	0	0	3	0	+3	AFC
Cambodia	3	3	0	0	12	1	+11	AFC
China	4	0	1	3	3	10	-7	AFC
Chinese Taipei	7	7	0	0	18	4	+14	AFC
Estonia	1	0	1	0	1	1	0	UEFA
Guam	2	1	0	1	1	1	0	AFC
Hong Kong	4	1	3	0	5	2	+3	AFC
India	5	3	1	1	9	7	+2	AFC
Indonesia	5	1	1	3	8	11	-3	AFC
Iran	10	2	3	6	9	19	-10	AFC
Iraq	2	0	0	2	2	6	-4	AFC
Japan	1	0	0	1	2	3	-1	AFC
Jordan	4	2	0	2	4	5	-1	AFC
Kazakhstan	2	0	1	1	0	2	–2	UEFA / AFC
Korea, North	7	1	4	2	7	6	+1	AFC
Korea, South	5	1	0	4	4	16	-12	AFC
Kuwait	5	0	2	3	4	13	-9	AFC
Kyrgyzstan	4	2	1	1	7	3	+4	AFC
Laos	2	2	0	0	9	3	+6	AFC
Lebanon	4	1	0	3	5	8	-3	AFC
Lithuania	1	0	0	1	1	2	-1	UEFA
Malaysia	2	0	0	2	1	4	-3	AFC
Maldives	2	2	0	0	6	2	+4	AFC
Myanmar	1	1	0	0	2	1	+1	AFC
Nepal	2	2	0	0	8	0	+8	AFC
Oman	7	1	0	6	6	14	-8	AFC
Palestine	1	0	1	0	0	0	0	AFC
Pakistan	1	1	0	0	3	0	+3	AFC
Philippines	4	2	0	2	7	4	+3	AFC
Qatar	3	0	0	3	1	8	-7	AFC
Romania	1	0	0	1	0	4	-4	UEFA
Saudi Arabia	4	0	1	3	2	7	-5	AFC
Singapore	3	1	1	1	5	6	-1	AFC
Sri Lanka	8	6	1	1	14	4	+10	AFC
Syria	2	0	1	1	2	6	-4	AFC
Tajikistan	7	2	2	3	6	11	-5	AFC
Thailand	4	1	1	2	7	7	0	AFC
United Arab Emirates	4	1	1	2	4	9	-5	AFC
Uganda	1	0	1	0	0	0	0	AFC
Uzbekistan	14	1	1	11	8	34	-26	AFC
Vietnam	6	5	0	1	12	4	+8	AFC
Yemen	3	3	0	0	7	1	+6	AFC
Total	176	65	31	80	259	272	–13	

^a Turkmenistan was supposed to face Brunei in the 2014 AFC Challenge Cup qualifiers but the latter withdrew from the tournament. Turkmenistan was awarded a 3-goal victory for the supposed match.

== FIFA ranking history ==
View source data.

== Honours ==
=== Continental ===
- AFC Challenge Cup
  - (silver) Runners-up (2): 2010, 2012

=== Friendly ===
- Turkmenistan President's Cup (1): 1997
- HCM City Cup (1): 2008

=== Summary ===
Only official honours are included, according to FIFA statutes (competitions organized/recognized by FIFA or an affiliated confederation).

Competition	1st place, gold medalist(s)	2nd place, silver medalist(s)	3rd place, bronze medalist(s)	Total
AFC Challenge Cup	0	2	0	2
Total	0	2	0	2
