= Röwşen Muhadow =

Turkmen footballer (born 1961)

Rovshen Muhadov
Personal information
- Full name: Röwşen Abdurahmanowiç Muhadow
- Date of birth: 23 September 1961 (age 65)
- Place of birth: Ashgabat, Soviet Union

Senior career*
Years	Team	Apps	(Gls)
–1988	FK Köpetdag Aşgabat	208	(119)
1989	Pakhtakor Tashkent	35	(8)
1990	CSKA Pamir Dushanbe	0	(0)
1990-1992	FK Köpetdag Aşgabat	76	(58)
1992–1993	Gençlerbirliği	18	(5)
1994	Yelimay	24	(15)
1995–1996	Yimpaş Yozgatspor	8	(1)
1996	Nevşehirspor	14	(2)
1997	Yelimay	14	(1)
1997–1998	FK Köpetdag Aşgabat		
1998–1999	Nisa Aşgabat		

International career
1992–1994	Turkmenistan	12	(3)

Managerial career
- 1999–2000: Nisa Aşgabat
- 1999–2000: Turkmenistan
- 2003–2007: Turkmenistan Olympic Team
- 2010–2011: Ahal FK
- 2012–2013: Turkmenistan (youth)
- 2012–2013: Turkmenistan U-16
- 2016–2017: Turkmenistan
- 2021: Turkmenistan
- 2025–2026: FK Arkadag
- * Club domestic league appearances and goals

Rovshen Abdurahmanovich Muhadov (Turkmen: Röwşen Abdurahmanowiç Muhadow; born on 23 September 1961) is a Turkmen football coach and former player who played as a forward. He most notably coached the Turkmen national team. He is one of the honored coaches of Turkmenistan. He is a master of Sports of the Republic of Kazakhstan in 1994.

== Personal life ==
Röwşen Muhadow was born in Ashkhabad (Turkmen SSR) on 23 September 1961. His brother, Çaryýar, is also a well-known Turkmen footballer, heading the headquarters of the Turkmen national team for some time. His son, Azat, plays for the club "Balkan" in Turkmenistan.

== Playing career ==
Muhadow pegan playing on the football of the local team Kolkhozchi (which later changed its name to Kopetdag), which played in the Second Allied League. He played his first match for the Ashgabat club in the USSR Cup in 1980 against Guria from Lunchhuti, coming on as a substitute after the break and finishing up to 82 minutes of the match. He made his debut in the USSR championship in the second league in 1982. Most of his time playing for the Ashgabat club, he was the team's top scorer, highly productive, and in 1988 scored 24 goals in 34 games.

In 1989, after a successful 1988 season, Muhadowreceived an invitation from the first league club Pakhtakor from Tashkent. He played 35 matches for the Uzbek team, in which he scored 8 goals per match, but Pakhtakor took a place in the middle of the standings, and failed to return to the top league.

In the early 1990s, Muhadow and his older brother, Çaryýar, were part of the Pamir Premier League team from Dushanbe, but unlike his brother, he never played for the Tajik club, and returned to Kopetdag.,

In the mid-1990s, he returned to Kopetdag, with which he played successfully in the Second League until the collapse of the Soviet Union in 1991. After resuming playing for his home club, Muhadow became his top scorer again, and in the 1991 season, with 35 goals scored in 42 games, he became the top scorer in the eastern zone of the USSR Buffer League, and Kopetdag took second place in the zone, and had next year to play in the first allied league. Together with the team, he started in the championship of Turkmenistan, and scored a lot - after the first 13 games played by Kopetdag, he scored 25 goals. However, after the Soviet Unions's collapse, all former union republics began to hold their national championships. Kopetdag won the first championship of Turkmenistan in 1992.

In October 1992, after winning the championship in Turkmenistan, Muhadow decided to try his hand in the Turkish championship, and during the season he played for the capital's club "Genclerbirligi".

In 1994, Muhadow received an invitation from the Kazakh Premier League club Elimay from Semipalatinsk. As part of the Kazakh club, Muhadow was one of the top scorers, scoring 15 goals, and became the champion of Kazakhstan, and became the master of sports of Kazakhstan.

From mid-1995, he played again in Turkey, for the clubs of the lower leagues, where he played first for Impash Yozgatspor and then for Nevshehirspor. In 1997, he returned to Elimay, but failed to regain his former performance, scoring only 14 goals in 14 matches. In 1998, Muhadow returned to the Kopetdag, where he approached his former performance and again became the champion of Turkmenistan. In the 1998–1999 season, for the Ashgabat club, with which he became the champion of Turkmenistan again this season, after which he finished playing on the football fields.

== International career ==
Muhadow began playing for the national team of Turkmenistan. He played in the first match of the Turkmen national team, in which it lost to Kazakhstan with a score of 0–1 in Almaty.

As part of the national team Muhadow played at the 1994 Asian Games in Japan. In total, he played 12 matches for the national team from 1992 to 2000, in which he scored 3 goals.

== Coaching career ==
Muhadow began his coaching career at the end of the player's career, at the same time leading his last club "Nisa" and the national team of Turkmenistan. He worked in these positions for less than a year.

In 2003-2007 he worked as the head coach of the country's Olympic team. At the same time, he coached the national youth team.

In 2010, Muhadow has headed the Akhal Turkmen club for some time. In September 2011, Muhadov received a Pro coaching license which entitles him to coach national teams and clubs in any country in the world.

From 2012 to 2013, Muhadow coached the country's youth team, with which he won the President's Cup of Turkmenistan in 2012.

Since 2016, he has been working as the head coach of the youth national team of the Turkmen U-16 team. Muhadow has the title of Honored Coach of Turkmenistan.

On 12 March 2021, Muhadow became the coach of the Turkmenistan national football team.

== Managerial statistics ==
Managerial record by team and tenure
Team	Nat	From	To	Record							
Team	Nat	From	To	G	W	D	L	GF	GA	GD	Win %
Arkadag	(Turkmenistan)	17 September 2025	present	17	12	3	2	34	13	+21	70.59
Career total				17	12	3	2	34	13	+21	70.59
