= Mergen Orazov =

Turkmenistani football manager

Mergen Orazow
Personal information
- Full name: Mergen Guwançmyradowiç Orazow
- Date of birth: 22 February 1988 (age 38)
- Place of birth: Bekrewe, Turkmen SSR, Soviet Union

Team information
- Current team: Arkadag (head coach)

Managerial career
- Years: Team
- 2021–2022: Ahal
- 2023–2025: Turkmenistan
- 2025–2026: Dainava
- 2026–: Arkadag

Mergen Guvanchmyradovich Orazov (Turkmen: Mergen Guwançmyradowiç Orazow) is a Turkmenistani manager / head coach who is currently in charge of Ýokary Liga club Arkadag. Orazov is a UEFA Pro Licence coach. He is a former professional football and futsal player.

== Career ==
=== Early years ===
Orazov was born in Bekrewe, now part of Ashgabat. Orazov began playing football at an early age and at seven years of age, he was enrolled in the Ak Guş football team. At 16, he joined the youth team of Ashgabat's Nisa Aşgabat. Soon he began to be involved in the game and for the main team of the club. After graduating from high school, however, he enrolled at the Pennsylvania State University and went to the United States.

=== College career ===
In 2005, Orazov joined Penn State Nittany Lions in the United States.

=== Futsal playing career ===
Upon his return to Turkmenistan, Orazow took up professional futsal. As a member of Arvana Ashgabat, he became the champion of Turkmenistan five times.

==== International futsal career ====
He made five appearances for the Turkmenistan national futsal team in the final tournaments of the AFC Futsal Championship.

== Futsal coaching career ==
After concluding his professional playing career, Orazov became the head coach of the futsal club Köpetdag. Under his leadership, the team achieved notable success, winning the Turkmenistan Futsal Super League twice, including the 2020 season, in which he was also named Best Coach.

In 2019, he also led Köpetdag to victory in the inaugural Turkmenistan Futsal Super Cup.

== Football coaching career ==
His coaching career began in Aşgabat, where he worked as an assistant at the football club FC Altyn Asyr. He later went on to manage the team FK Köpetdag Aşgabat.

In 2021, he was appointed manager of Ahal, helping them win the league, their first league title. Ahal also won the Turkmenistan Cup and the Football Federation of Turkmenistan Cup. He was named the best coach of Turkmenistan in 2022.

In 2023, he was appointed manager of Turkmenistan.

On 24 June 2025, Lithuanian A Lyga club DFK Dainava announced the appointment of Orazov as their new head coach. Later that day, he made his debut in an A Lyga match against FK Banga Gargždai (2:1), leading Dainava to their first victory of the 2025 season.

In January 2026, following his spell at Lithuanian club Dainava, Orazov joined FK Arkadag. He succeeded Rovshen Mukhadov as the club’s head coach for the AFC Champions League Two ahead of the 2025–26 round of 16. Arkadag faced Saudi Arabian club Al Nassr, losing 1–0 in Ashgabat on 11 February and 1–0 in Riyadh on 18 February, for a 2–0 aggregate defeat.

Orazov continued as Arkadag’s head coach in the 2026–27 AFC Champions League Two. The club opened its group campaign with a 1–0 home win over Bahrain’s Al Muharraq and defeated Iran’s Golgohar Sirjan by the same score on 4 November.

== Personal life ==
Graduated from Pennsylvania State University (US) with a degree in Business Management.

He speaks Turkmen, English and Russian fluently.

== Honours ==
Ahal

- Ýokary Liga: 2022
- Turkmenistan Cup: 2022
- Turkmenistan Football Federation Cup: 2022
