= Sport toplumy (Daşoguz) =

Multi-purpose stadium

Sport Toplumy Stadium
- Interactive map of Sport Toplumy Stadium
- Location: Dashoguz, Turkmenistan
- Coordinates: 41°49′34″N 59°56′04″E
- Owner: Dashoguz city Administration
- Capacity: 10,000
- Surface: Grass
- Record attendance: 10,000 (Turkmenistan vs Iran, 17 June 2015)

Construction
- Opened: 2010

Tenants
- FC Daşoguz; Turkmenistan national football team

Sport Toplumy Stadium is a multi-purpose stadium in Daşoguz, Turkmenistan. It is currently used mostly for football matches and serves as the home stadium for FC Daşoguz. The stadium holds 10,000 people.

== History ==
The sports complex, which is spread over 13 hectares, opened in 2010. There are spectator stands which are designed for 10,000 people, as well as, treadmills laid around the football field for athletes. The sports complex offers facilities for various sports. It features an indoor swimming pool, rooms for volleyball, basketball, boxing and Turkmen national wrestling göreş. Also, there are open areas for mini-football, volleyball, basketball courts and two tennis courts. There is a sportswear and souvenir shop and a hotel with 50 seats for athletes and guests.

On June 16, 2015 the stadium held a 2018 FIFA World Cup qualifying match between Turkmenistan and Iran, which ended in a 1–1 tie. The match also marked the first time that the national team hosted a game outside of the capital, Ashgabat.
