= Mekan Saparow =

Turkmen footballer (born 1994)

Mekan Saparov
Personal information
- Full name: Mekan Meredovich Saparov
- Date of birth: 22 April 1994 (age 32)
- Place of birth: Balkanabat, Turkmenistan
- Height: 1.83 m (6 ft 0 in)
- Position: Defender

Team information
- Current team: FK Arkadag
- Number: 4

Senior career*
Years	Team	Apps	(Gls)
2011–2013	Balkan		
2015	Ahal		
2016-2017	FC Balkan		
2018-2023	FC Altyn Asyr		
2023-	FC Arkadag		

International career^{‡}
2014–	Turkmenistan	39	(3)
- * Club domestic league appearances and goals ‡ National team caps and goals as of 16 September 2025

Mekan Saparov (Turkmen: Mekan Meredowiç Saparow; born 22 April 1994) is a Turkmen professional footballer who plays for FK Arkadag. He is part of the Turkmenistan national team from 2014.

== Club career ==
He began his professional career in 2011 in FC Balkan. In 2013 with FC Balkan he won the 2013 AFC President's Cup in Malaysia. In 2015, he moved for 2 month loan to the FC Ahal.

== International career ==
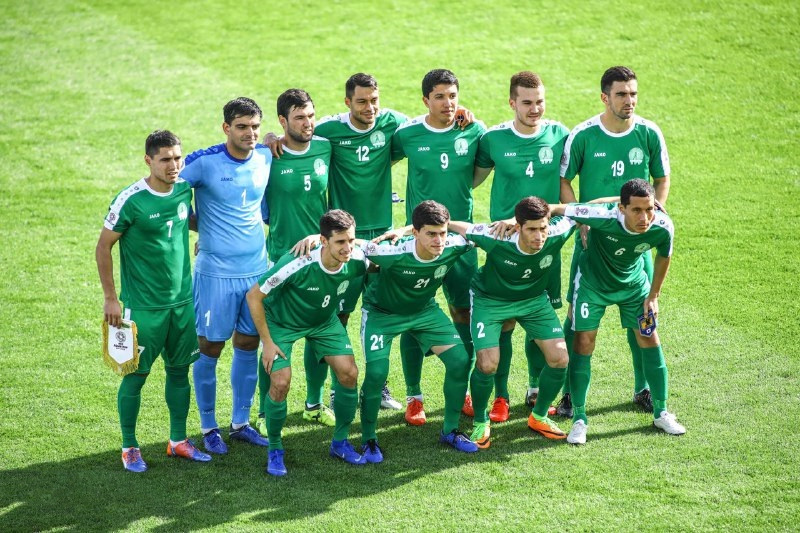
№4 Saparow at 2019 AFC Asian Cup with Turkmenistan national team

Saparow made his senior national team debut on 23 May 2014, in a 2014 AFC Challenge Cup match against Philippines.

He played for Turkmenistan youth team in Commonwealth of Independent States Cup 2012, 2013 and 2015.

He was included in Turkmenistan's squad for the 2019 AFC Asian Cup in the United Arab Emirates.

== International goals ==
Scores and results list Turkmenistan's goal tally first.

#	Date	Venue	Opponent	Score	Result	Competition
1.	12 November 2015	Azadi Stadium, Tehran, Iran	Iran	1–1	1–3	2018 FIFA World Cup qualification
2.	10 June 2025	Ashgabat Stadium, Ashgabat, Turkmenistan	Thailand	3–1	3–1	2027 AFC Asian Cup qualification
3.	14 October 2025	Arkadag Stadium, Arkadag, Turkmenistan	Sri Lanka	2–0	2–1	2027 AFC Asian Cup qualification

== Honours ==
Balkan

- AFC President's Cup: 2013

FK Arkadag

- AFC Challenge League: 2024–25

=== State medals ===
- Medal For the love of the Fatherland (2025)
