= Cristian Roque =

Brazilian footballer (born 1995)

Personal information
- Full name: Cristian Roque Silveira dos Santos
- Date of birth: 27 May 1995 (age 31)
- Place of birth: Paulo Afonso, Bahia, Brazil
- Height: 1.80 m (5 ft 11 in)
- Positions: Forward; winger

Team information
- Current team: Visakha
- Number: 21

Youth career
- 2012: Arapongas
- 2012–2015: Paraná
- 2015: Canindé

Senior career*
Years	Team	Apps	(Gls)
2016	Itabaiana	7	(0)
2016–2018	Operário-PR	18	(2)
2018	Batel	11	(1)
2018	Juventus Jaraguá	11	(3)
2018	Rio Branco	4	(0)
2019	Itaboraí	7	(0)
2019	São Gonçalo EC	7	(1)
2020–2021	Fluminense de Feira	19	(4)
2021–2022	Pérolas Negras	21	(2)
2022	Desportiva-ES		
2022–2024	Nagaworld	35	(12)
2024–2026	Preah Khan Reach Svay Rieng	55	(23)
2026–	Visakha	6	(1)
- * Club domestic league appearances and goals as of 9 November 2026

Cristian Roque Silveira dos Santos (born 27 May 1995) is a Brazilian professional footballer who plays as a forward for Cambodian Premier League club Visakha.

== Club career ==
Cristian signed for Fluminense de Feira in 2020.

Cristian started his career in Asia after joining Cambodian Premier League club, Nagaworld in 2022 where he spent two seasons with the club. During his time with the club, he also won Champions eFootball in 2023.

Cristian joined another Cambodian side Preah Khan Reach Svay Rieng in 2024 where he made an impressive performance especially in 2024–25 AFC Challenge League where he mostly became top scorer of the tournament.

== International career ==
Born in Brazil, Cristian expressed interest in joining the Cambodia national team. He stated that living in Cambodia was more than football career.

== Honours ==
Operário-PR

- Campeonato Brasileiro Série D: 2017
- Taça FPF: 2016

Preah Khan Reach Svay Rieng

- Cambodian Premier League: 2024–25, 2025–26
- AFC Challenge League runner-up: 2024–25, 2025–26
