= FK Arkadag =

Association football club in Turkmenistan

Arkadag
- Full name: Arkadag Futbol Kluby
- Nickname: The White Horse of Arkadag
- Short name: AFK
- Founded: 1 April 2023; 3 years ago
- Ground: Arkadag Stadium; Ashgabat Olympic Stadium (selected matches)
- Capacity: 10,000; 45,000
- Owner: Arkadag City Administration
- President: Arslanmyrat Amanow
- Head coach: Mergen Orazov
- League: Ýokary Liga
- 2026: Ýokary Liga, 1st of 8 (champions)
Home colours	Away colours	Third colours

FK Arkadag (Turkmen: Arkadag Futbol Kluby, Arkadag FK) is a professional football club based in Arkadag, Turkmenistan. Founded in 2023 by Gurbanguly Berdimuhamedow, the club plays in the Ýokary Liga.

Domestically they have won the double in every year possible, thrice in three seasons. In Asia, the team won the Challenge League title in its first participation, and reached the knockouts of the ACL 2. Arkadag has won every domestic match since their founding and has the longest streak ever recorded in world football. However, the Guinness World Records does not accept the legitimacy.

== History ==
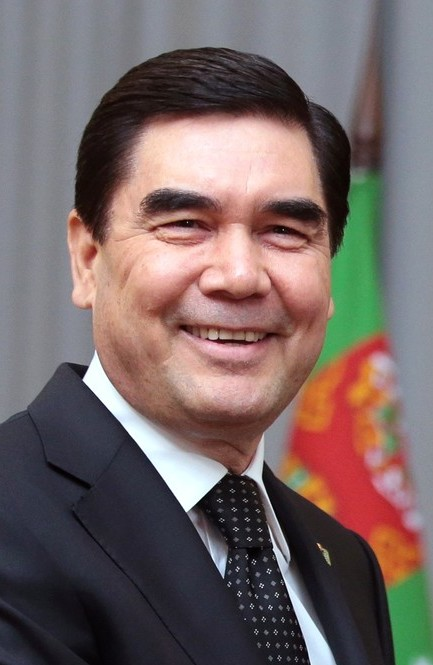
Gurbanguly Berdimuhamedow, second president of Turkmenistan, the club founder

Arkadag was formed in the run-up to the 2023 domestic season. Many of the country's best players joined the club in a transfer window that was specially expanded. Competing in the Turkmenistan top flight right from its foundation, they have undergone criticism by rival fans for being favored by the authorities in the 2023 Ýokary Liga. In November, Wladimir Baýramow became the new manager of FK Arkadag, receiving a one-year contract. Also in this month the team logo with the image of an Akhal-Teke horse was presented.

On 3 December, Arkadag clinched their first championship title in the Turkmenistan Higher League, by defeating Altyn Asyr 4–0. They won all 24 league matches. The club had a total of 72 points with a goal difference of 83–17. Their league top scorer was Didar Durdyev with 27 goals. They also secured place in the 2024–25 AFC Champions League Two qualifiers. On 24 December 2023, Wladimir Baýramow guided Arkadag to their second trophy, defeating Ahal FK 3–0 in Turkmenistan Cup final at the Arkadag Stadium. For the team's successful performance in the 2023 season, the team was gifted a MAN bus.

In June 2023, Arkadag was licensed to participate in the AFC Challenge League. On 7 October 2024, defending champions Arkadag successfully retained their League title after a 5–1 victory over Nebitçi. They got into the group with the Kuwait giants Al-Arabi SC and the reigning Maldives and Kyrgyz champions Maziya and Abdysh-Ata Kant. Their first match was a 2–1 win against Maziya at Al Kuwait Sports Club Stadium in Kuwait City. On 29 October 2024, FK Arkadag recorded an upset over Abdysh-Ata Kant by winning 2–0.

On 1 November 2024, the club suffered defeat against Al-Arabi to end a streak of 61 consecutive wins in official competitions (50 in the Ýokary Liga, 9 in the Turkmenistan Cup, and 2 in the AFC Challenge League). However, this streak is not recognized by the Guinness World Records due to concerns about the league's governance. The Guinness instead recognizes Al-Hilal's 34 game win streak from 2023–24. On 10 May 2025, Arkadag won the inaugural AFC Challenge League after beating Svay Rieng by 2–1 in the final. They became the first club to tentatively qualify for the 2025–26 AFC Champions League Two group stage. On the eve of the group stage, FK Arkadag added Röwşen Muhadow as the new coach. On September 18, Arkadag earned their first point in the ACL2 debut match, drawing 0–0 with Uzbekistan's Andijon. On 25 September 2025, FK Arkadag won the Turkmenistan Super Cup for the second year in a row, defeating FC Ahal by 3–0 at Nusaý Stadium.

In September 2025, Turkmen president Serdar Berdimuhamedov awarded the "Medal For the love of the Fatherland" medals to Arkadag members, including club president Arslanmyrat Amanow, former coach Vladimir Bayramov, assistants Ahmet Allaberdiyev and Pawel Matus, administrator Konstantin Grigoryants, as well as players Rasul Çaryýew, Güýçmyrat Annagulyýew, Mekan Saparov, Ahmet Atayev, Welmyrat Ballakow, Mirza Beknazarov, Yazgylych Gurbanov, Didar Durdyýew, and Begench Akmammedov.

Following their 4-0 win over Ahal on 28 September, Arkadag were crowned Ýokary Liga champions for the fourth season in a row.

== Stadiums ==
Arkadag's main home ground is the 10,000-capacity Arkadag Stadium. Nusaý Stadium used to be the home ground of the club at some Ýokary Liga matches. Ashgabat Olympic Stadium hosted selected AFC Champions League Two matches.

== Colours ==
=== Crest ===
The club crest has been a rampant Akhal-Teke horse against the backdrop of the Kopetdag mountains. The logo uses white and blue colors.

=== Kit ===
Arkadag's traditional home kit predominantly consists of green and white colours. The second set of kit is completely green with white elements.

Period	Brand	Sponsor
2023–present	Jako	Arkadag City Administration

== Current squad ==
Note: Flags indicate national team as defined under FIFA eligibility rules; some limited exceptions apply. Players may hold more than one non-FIFA nationality.

No.	Pos.	Nation	Player
1	GK	TKM	Rüstem Ahallyýew
2	DF	TKM	Güýçmyrat Annagulyýew
4	DF	TKM	Mekan Saparow
5	DF	TKM	Abdy Bäşimow
6	MF	TKM	Meýlis Durdyýew
8	FW	TKM	Yhlas Saparmämmedow
9	FW	TKM	Rahman Myratberdiýew
10	MF	TKM	Resul Hojaýew
11	FW	TKM	Didar Durdyýew
12	MF	TKM	Ybraýym Mämmedow
13	MF	TKM	Welmyrat Ballakow
14	FW	TKM	Şanazar Tirkişow
15	MF	TKM	Bagtyýar Agabayev
16	GK	TKM	Rasul Çaryýew

No.	Pos.	Nation	Player
17	FW	TKM	Altymyrat Annadurdyýew
18	MF	TKM	Arzuwguly Sapargulýyew
19	MF	TKM	Begenç Akmämmedow
21	MF	TKM	Mirza Beknazarow
23	FW	TKM	Berdimyrat Rejebow
25	DF	TKM	Ilýas Çaryýew
31	MF	TKM	Yazgylyç Gurbanow
33	FW	TKM	Diyargylych Urazov
35	GK	TKM	Kakageldi Berdiýew
70	MF	TKM	Meylis Diniyev
71	FW	TKM	Dayanch Meredov
77	MF	TKM	Şamämmet Hydyrow
88	MF	TKM	Ahmet Ataýew
—	FW	TKM	Enwer Annaýew

== Records ==
=== Domestic ===
Season	League									Turkmenistan Cup	Top goalscorer	
Season	Div.	Pld	W	D	L	GF	GA	Pts	Pos.	Turkmenistan Cup	Player(s)	Goals
2023	Ýokary Liga	24	24	0	0	83	17	72	1st	Winners	(Turkmenistan) Didar Durdyýew	27
2024	Ýokary Liga	30	30	0	0	147	20	90	1st	Winners	(Turkmenistan) Didar Durdyýew	31
2025	Ýokary Liga	28	28	0	0	105	15	84	1st	Winners	(Turkmenistan) Didar Durdyýew	27
2026	Ýokary Liga								1st			

=== Continental ===
As of match played 4 November 2026

Competition	Pld.	W	D	L	GF	GA
AFC Challenge League	8	6	0	2	14	8
AFC Champions League Two	13	4	5	4	11	10
Total	21	10	5	6	25	18

Season	Competition	Round	Nat	Club	Home	Away	Aggregate
2024–25	AFC Challenge League	Group B	(Maldives)	Maziya	2–1		1st
2024–25	AFC Challenge League	Group B	(Kyrgyzstan)	Abdysh-Ata Kant	2–0		1st
2024–25	AFC Challenge League	Group B	(Kuwait)	Al-Arabi	2–3		1st
2024–25	AFC Challenge League	Quarter-final	(India)	East Bengal	2–1	1–0	3–1
2024–25	AFC Challenge League	Semi-final	(Kuwait)	Al-Arabi	3–0	0–2	3–2
2024–25	AFC Challenge League	Final	(Cambodia)	PKR Svay Rieng	2–1 (a.e.t.)		
2025–26	AFC Champions League Two	Group B	(Qatar)	Al-Ahli	1–1	2–2	2nd
2025–26	AFC Champions League Two	Group B	(Uzbekistan)	Andijon	0–0	1–1	2nd
2025–26	AFC Champions League Two	Group B	(Bahrain)	Al-Khaldiya	1–0	0–2	2nd
2025–26	AFC Champions League Two	Round of 16	(Saudi Arabia)	Al-Nassr	0–1	0–1	0–2
2026–27	AFC Champions League Two	Preliminary stage	(India)	Goa	3–0		
2026–27	AFC Champions League Two	Group B	(United Arab Emirates)	Al-Jazira		1–2	
2026–27	AFC Champions League Two	Group B	(Iran)	Gol Gohar	1–0	0–0	
2026–27	AFC Champions League Two	Group B	(Bahrain)	Al-Muharraq	1–0		

== Coaching history ==
Name	Nationality	Years
Guwançmuhammet Öwekow	(Turkmenistan)	2023
Begençmuhammet Kulyýew	(Turkmenistan)	2023
Wladimir Baýramow	(Turkmenistan)	2023–
Didar Hajyýew	(Turkmenistan)	2024 (2024–25 ACGL group stage)
Döwletmyrat Annaýew	(Turkmenistan)	2025
Ahmet Allaberdyýew	(Turkmenistan)	2025
Röwşen Muhadow	(Turkmenistan)	2025
Mergen Orazow	(Turkmenistan)	2026–

== Top scorers ==
Season	First	Second	Third
2023	Didar Durdyýew (27)	Begmyrat Baýow (9)	Şanazar Tirkişow (7)
2024	Didar Durdyýew (31)	Altymyrat Annadurdyýew (24)	Begenç Akmämmedow (19)
2025	Didar Durdyýew (27)	Begenç Akmämmedow (17)	Altymyrat Annadurdyýew (16)

== Honours ==
=== Domestic ===
- Ýokary Liga
  - Champions (4): 2023, 2024, 2025, 2026
- Turkmenistan Cup
  - Champions (3): 2023, 2024, 2025
- Turkmenistan Super Cup
  - Champions (3): 2024, 2025, 2026
- Turkmenistan Football Federation Cup
  - Champions (2): 2025, 2026

=== Continental ===
- AFC Challenge League
  - Champions (1): 2024–25
