= Morodok Techo National Stadium =

Stadium in Phnom Penh, Cambodia

- ពហុកីឡាដ្ឋានជាតិមរតកតេជោ
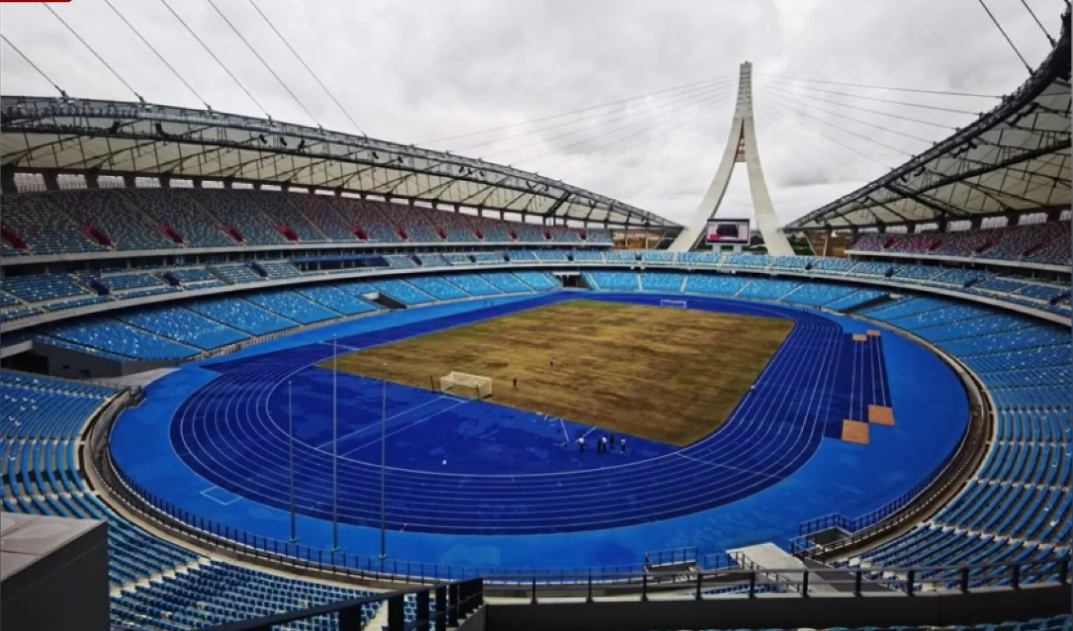
- Morodok Techo National Stadium in 2021
- Interactive map of Morodok Techo National Stadium
- Location: Win Win Boulevard ., Phnom Penh, Cambodia
- Coordinates: 11°40′58.4″N 104°52′34.6″E
- Owner: Royal Government of Cambodia
- Capacity: 60,000
- Surface: GrassMaster
- Record attendance: 60,000 (2023 SEA Games opening ceremony, 5 May 2023)
- Field size: 115 yd × 74 yd (105 m × 68 m)

Construction
- Groundbreaking: April 2017; 9 years ago
- Opened: August 2021; 5 years ago
- Renovated: 2024
- Cost: KHR6,720 billion (US$168 million)
- Architects: China IPPR International Engineering CO., LTD.

Tenants
- Cambodia national football team (2021–present); Preah Khan Reach Svay Rieng (selected matches)

Website
- nsc.gov.kh

The Morodok Techo National Stadium (Khmer: ពហុកីឡដ្ឋានជាតិមរតកតេជោ, UNGEGN: Pôhŏkeilâdthan Chéatĕ Môrôtâk Téchoŭ, ALA-LC: Bahukīlaṭṭhān Jāti Maratak Tejo) is a multi-purpose stadium in Phnom Penh, Cambodia. It is the main venue of the larger Morodok Techo National Sports Complex. The stadium has a capacity of 60,000.

== Construction ==
The Morodok Techo National Sports Complex, which includes the main stadium, was constructed specifically for Cambodia's hosting of the 2023 SEA Games. Construction of the sports complex began in April 2013 while the construction of the main stadium began in August 2017. The groundbreaking ceremony for the stadium was held earlier on April 4, 2017. The Chinese government provided 1.1 billion Chinese yuan (about $160 million) aid for the construction of the stadium which was developed by the China State Construction Engineering Corporation. Around 340 Chinese engineers and 240 Cambodian workers and technicians were involved in the construction. By January 2019 the installation of seats was completed.

== Architecture and design ==
The structure of the Morodok Techo National Stadium was designed to resemble a sailing ship. It is a symbol of Cambodia-China relations, as the first Chinese people in the country came by these ships. The stadium is planned to be 39.9 m (131 ft) tall with two "prow" structures rising 99 m (325 ft) high which were designed to allude to the Khmer gesture of Sampeah. The whole stadium's design is based on the Rumduol flower and a moat surrounds it, similar to those used in the Angkor Wat. The stadium has a seating capacity of 75,000 people.

== History ==
The stadium also hosted Preah Khan Reach Svay Rieng matches in the 2024–25 AFC Challenge League knockout stage and the 2024–25 AFC Challenge League final between Preah Khan Svay Rieng FC and FK Arkadag.

== Notable events ==
=== International Football ===
Date	Competition	Team	Score	Team	Crowd
20 December 2022	2022 AFF Championship	Cambodia	3–2	Philippines	4,860
29 December 2022	2022 AFF Championship	Cambodia	5–1	Brunei	6,169
24 July 2026	2026 ASEAN Championship	Cambodia	1–2	Singapore	27,790
3 August 2026	2026 ASEAN Championship	Cambodia	3–0	Timor-Leste	6,548

=== Club Football ===
Date	Competition	Team	Score	Team	Crowd
10 May 2025	2024–25 AFC Challenge League Final	Preah Khan Reach Svay Rieng FC	1–2	FK Arkadag	51,610

=== Cricket ===
Morodok Techo National Stadium
- Interactive map of Morodok Techo National Stadium

Ground information
- Location: Phnom Penh, Cambodia
- Country: Cambodia

International information
- First women's T20I: 8 February 2023: Cambodia v Singapore
- Last women's T20I: 12 February 2023: Cambodia v Singapore
- As of 12 February 2023; Source: Cricinfo

The first international cricket match was held in the venue on 8 February 2023, when Cambodia hosted a bilateral series against Singapore.

=== International record ===
==== Women's Twenty20 International five-wicket hauls ====
The following table summarizes the five-wicket hauls taken in WT20Is at this venue.

#	Figures	Player	Country	Innings	Opponent	Date	Result
1	5/6	Ada Bhasin	Singapore	1	Cambodia	8 February 2023	Won
