= Altymyrat Annadurdyýew =

Turkmen footballer

Personal information
- Full name: Altymyrat Myratowiç Annadurdyýew
- Date of birth: April 13, 1993 (age 33)
- Place of birth: Ashgabat, Turkmenistan
- Height: 1.81 m (5 ft 11 in)
- Position: Striker

Team information
- Current team: FK Arkadag
- Number: 17

Senior career*
Years	Team	Apps	(Gls)
2015	FC Ahal	20	(3)
2016–2022	FC Altyn Asyr	185	(66)
2023–	FK Arkadag	54	(45)

International career^{‡}
2015–	Turkmenistan	42	(9)
- * Club domestic league appearances and goals as of 27 September 2025 ‡ National team caps and goals as of 1 January 2026

Altymyrat Myratowiç Annadurdyýew (born April 13, 1993) is a professional Turkmen football player who plays for FK Arkadag. He is also a member of the Turkmenistan national football team.

== Club career ==
He was born in Ashgabat, Turkmenistan, and started his career in futsal team Galkan in Ashgabat. He became the champion of Turkmenistan 2014 and top scorer (10 goals).

In 2015, he moved to the professional football by signing a contract with the FC Ahal. He made his debut for his new club in the framework of the 2015 AFC Cup against FC Dordoi Bishkek, already in the 9 minute, scoring from the free kick. In the first game of the 2015 Ýokary Liga has issued a poker against FC Energetik Türkmebaşy (6:0).

From 2016 till 2022 he played for FC Altyn Asyr.

== International career ==
Annadurdyýew made his senior national team debut on 11 June 2015 against Guam.

=== International goals ===
Scores and results list Turkmenistan's goal tally first.

No.	Date	Venue	Opponent	Score	Result	Competition
1.	28 March 2017	Taipei Municipal Stadium, Taipei, Chinese Taipei	Chinese Taipei	1–0	3–1	2019 AFC Asian Cup qualification
2.	5 September 2017	Jalan Besar Stadium, Kallang, Singapore	Singapore	1–1	1–1	2019 AFC Asian Cup qualification
3.	14 November 2017	Sport toplumy, Balkanabat, Turkmenistan	Chinese Taipei	2–0	2–1	2019 AFC Asian Cup qualification
4.	17 January 2019	Mohammed bin Zayed Stadium, Abu Dhabi, United Arab Emirates	Oman	1–1	1–3	2019 AFC Asian Cup
5.	10 October 2019	Camille Chamoun Sports City Stadium, Beirut, Lebanon	Lebanon	1–1	1–2	2022 FIFA World Cup qualification
6.	19 November 2019	Köpetdag Stadium, Ashgabat, Turkmenistan	Sri Lanka	1–0	2–0	2022 FIFA World Cup qualification
7.	9 June 2021	Goyang Stadium, Goyang, South Korea	Lebanon	3–2	3–2	2022 FIFA World Cup qualification
8.	8 June 2022	Bukit Jalil National Stadium, Kuala Lumpur, Malaysia	Malaysia	1–2	1–3	2023 AFC Asian Cup qualification
9.	11 June 2022	Bukit Jalil National Stadium, Kuala Lumpur, Malaysia	Bangladesh	1–0	2–1	2023 AFC Asian Cup qualification

== Honours ==
FK Arkadag

- AFC Challenge League: 2024–25

Individual

- AFC Challenge League top scorer : 2024–25
