= 2024–25 AFC Challenge League =

Tournament details
- Dates: Qualifying: 13 August 2024; Competition proper: 26 October 2024 – 10 May 2025
- Teams: Competition proper: 18; Total: 20 (from 20 associations)

Final positions
- Champions: (Turkmenistan) Arkadag (1st title)
- Runners-up: (Cambodia) Svay Rieng

Tournament statistics
- Matches played: 37
- Goals scored: 103 (2.78 per match)
- Attendance: 158,383 (4,281 per match)
- Top scorer(s): (Turkmenistan) Altymyrat Annadurdyýew (5 goals)
- Best player: (Turkmenistan) Şanazar Tirkişow
- Fair play award: (Cambodia) Svay Rieng

The 2024–25 AFC Challenge League was the eleventh edition of the Asia's tertiary continental club football competition, organized by the Asian Football Confederation (AFC), and the first season since it was rebranded from the AFC President's Cup to the AFC Challenge League.

It was the first edition since 2014, when the tournament was re-introduced in 2024 with a revamped format. The final was played on 10 May 2025 at the Morodok Techo National Stadium in Phnom Penh, Cambodia, with Turkmen club Arkadag defeating Cambodian club Svay Rieng 2–1 to win their first Asian title. Arkadag were making their debut in AFC club competitions, having qualified by winning the 2023 Ýokary Liga in their first year of existence; they also became the third consecutive club from Turkmenistan to win the competition. As winners of the tournament, Arkadag automatically qualified for the 2025–26 AFC Champions League Two group stage.

== Association team allocation ==
The associations were allocated slots according to their club competitions ranking, which was published after the 2022 competitions were completed.

Participation for 2024–25 AFC Challenge League
| Participating |
| Not participating |

West Region (3 groups)
| Rank | | Member association | Points | Slots | |
| Rank | | Member association | Points | Group stage | Preliminary stage |
| Region | AFC | Member association | Points | Group stage | Preliminary stage |
|---|---|---|---|---|---|
| 9 | 17 | India | 23.639 | 0 (+1 ACL2) | 0 |
| 10 | 18 | Bahrain | 20.681 | 0 (+1 ACL2) | 0 |
| 11 | 19 | Kuwait | 20.069 | 1 | 0 |
| 12 | 20 | Turkmenistan | 19.464 | 1 | 0 |
| 13 | 22 | Lebanon | 17.761 | 1 | 0 |
| 14 | 23 | Syria | 17.613 | 1 | 0 |
| 15 | 27 | Bangladesh | 14.121 | 1 | 0 |
| 16 | 28 | Oman | 12.453 | 1 | 0 |
| 17 | 29 | Maldives | 9.467 | 1 | 0 |
| 18 | 31 | Palestine | 5.760 | 1 | 0 |
| 19 | 33 | Kyrgyzstan | 4.308 | 0 | 1 |
| 20 | 37 | Nepal | 0.813 | 0 | 1 |
| 21 | 38 | Sri Lanka | 0.630 | 0 | 0 |
| 22 | 39 | Bhutan | 0.465 | 0 | 1 |
| 23 | 41 | Afghanistan | 0.090 | 0 | 1 |
| 24 | 42 | Pakistan | 0.000 | 0 | 0 |
| 24 | 42 | Yemen | 0.000 | 0 | 0 |
| Total | | Participating associations: 12 | | 10 | 4 |
| Total | | Participating associations: 12 | | 14 | |

East Region (2 groups)
| Rank | | Member association | Points | Slots | |
| Rank | | Member association | Points | Group stage | Preliminary stage |
| Region | AFC | Member association | Points | Group stage | Preliminary stage |
|---|---|---|---|---|---|
| 11 | 25 | North Korea | 16.117 | 0 | 0 |
| 12 | 26 | Indonesia | 15.083 | 1 | 0 |
| 13 | 30 | Myanmar | 8.287 | 1 | 0 |
| 14 | 32 | Cambodia | 5.455 | 1 | 0 |
| 15 | 34 | Macau | 2.800 | 0 | 0 |
| 16 | 35 | Chinese Taipei | 2.067 | 1 | 0 |
| 17 | 36 | Laos | 1.362 | 1 | 0 |
| 18 | 40 | Mongolia | 0.250 | 1 | 0 |
| 19 | 42 | Brunei | 0.000 | 0 | 0 |
| 19 | 42 | Guam | 0.000 | 0 | 0 |
| 19 | 42 | Northern Mariana Islands | 0.000 | 0 | 0 |
| 19 | 42 | Timor-Leste | 0.000 | 0 | 0 |
| Total | | Participating associations: 6 | | 6 | 0 |
| Total | | Participating associations: 6 | | 6 | |

Notes

1. AFC Licensing (AFC): Association did not have a licensed club.

== Teams ==
The number of appearances and last appearance include the AFC President's Cup as the predecessor of the AFC Challenge League.

| Entry round | West Region | | | East Region | | |
| Group stage | Team | Qualifying method | App. (last) | Team | Qualifying method | App. (last) |
|---|---|---|---|---|---|---|
| Group stage | (India) East Bengal | 2024–25 AFC Champions League Two qualifying round losers | 1st | (Indonesia) Madura United | 2023–24 Liga 1 runners-up | 1st |
| Group stage | (Bahrain) Al-Ahli Club | 2024–25 AFC Champions League Two qualifying round losers | 1st | (Myanmar) Shan United | 2023 Myanmar National League champions | 3rd (2009) |
| Group stage | (Kuwait) Al-Arabi | 2023–24 Kuwaiti Premier League runners-up | 1st | (Cambodia) Svay Rieng | 2023–24 Cambodian Premier League champions | 2nd (2014) |
| Group stage | (Turkmenistan) Arkadag | 2023 Ýokary Liga champions | 1st | (Chinese Taipei) Tainan City | 2023 Taiwan Football Premier League champions | 1st |
| Group stage | (Lebanon) Nejmeh | 2023–24 Lebanese Premier League champions | 1st | (Laos) Young Elephants | 2023 Lao League 1 champions | 1st |
| Group stage | (Syria) Al-Fotuwa | 2023–24 Syrian Premier League champions | 1st | (Mongolia) SP Falcons | 2023–24 Mongolian Premier League champions | 1st |
| Group stage | (Bangladesh) Bashundhara Kings | 2023–24 Bangladesh Premier League champions | 1st | | | |
| Group stage | (Oman) Al-Seeb | 2023–24 Oman Professional League champions | 1st | | | |
| Group stage | (Maldives) Maziya | 2023 Dhivehi Premier League champions | 1st | | | |
| Group stage | (Palestine) Hilal Al-Quds | 2022–23 West Bank Premier League runners-up | 2nd (2013) | | | |
| Preliminary stage | (Kyrgyzstan) Abdysh-Ata Kant | 2023 Kyrgyz Premier League champions | 1st | | | |
| Preliminary stage | (Nepal) Church Boys United | 2023 Martyr's Memorial A-Division League champions | 1st | | | |
| Preliminary stage | (Bhutan) Paro | 2023 Bhutan Premier League champions | 1st | | | |
| Preliminary stage | (Afghanistan) Attack Energy | 2024 Afghanistan Champions League champions | 1st | | | |

Notes

1. Palestine (PLE): Due to the Gaza war, the 2023–24 West Bank Premier League was cancelled after three games and the championship withheld by the Palestinian Football Association. The teams from Palestine are determined by the results of the 2022–23 West Bank Premier League. Jabal Al-Mukaber, the 2022–23 West Bank Premier League champions, failed to obtain an AFC license: instead, the runners-up Hilal Al-Quds participate in the AFC Challenge League group stage.
2. Turkmenistan (TKM): Arkadag initially qualified for the 2024–25 AFC Champions League Two, but failed to obtain an AFC Champions League Two license.

== Schedule ==
The schedule of the competition is as follows.

| Stage | Round | Draw date | West region | East Region |
|---|---|---|---|---|
| Preliminary stage | | No draw (Note: Pre-determined format) | 13 August 2024 | |
| Group stage | Matchday 1 | 22 August 2024 | 26 October 2024 | 27 October 2024 |
| Group stage | Matchday 2 | 22 August 2024 | 29 October 2024 | 30 October 2024 |
| Group stage | Matchday 3 | 22 August 2024 | 1 November 2024 | 2 November 2024 |
| Knockout stage | Quarter-finals | No draw | 5 and 12 March 2025 | 6 and 13 March 2025 |
| Knockout stage | Semi-finals | No draw | 9 and 16 April 2025 | 10 and 17 April 2025 |
| Knockout stage | Final | No draw | 10 May 2025 at Morodok Techo National Stadium, Phnom Penh | |

== Preliminary stage ==
The bracket of the preliminary stage was determined based on each team's association ranking and their seeding within their association, with the team from the higher-ranked association hosting the match. The two winners of the preliminary stage advanced to the group stage and joined the 16 direct entrants.

| Team 1 | Score | Team 2 |
|---|---|---|
| Church Boys United (Nepal) | 1–2 | (Bhutan) Paro |
| Abdysh-Ata Kant (Kyrgyzstan) | 2–0 | (Afghanistan) Attack Energy |

13 August 2024
18:00 UTC+5:45

| Church Boys United (Nepal) | 1–2 | (Bhutan) Paro |
|---|---|---|
| Limbu 38' | Report | Wangchuk 40'; Opoku 67' |

Dasharath Rangasala, Kathmandu (Note: Church Boys United played their home matches at Dasharath Rangasala, Kathmandu, instead of their regular home stadium Chyasal Stadium, Lalitpur.)
Attendance: 9,873
Referee: Wiwat Jumpaoon (Thailand)

13 August 2024
20:00 UTC+6

| Abdysh-Ata Kant (Kyrgyzstan) | 2–0 | (Afghanistan) Attack Energy |
|---|---|---|
| Dzhumashev 11' (pen.); Zhyrgalbek 52' | Report |

Kurmanbek Stadium, Jalal-Abad (Note: Abdysh-Ata Kant played their home matches at Kurmanbek Stadium, Jalal-Abad, instead of their regular home stadium Stadion Sportkompleks Abdysh-Ata, Kant.)
Attendance: 955
Referee: Thoriq Alkatiri (Indonesia)

== Group stage ==
The draw for the group stage took place on 22 August at the AFC House in Kuala Lumpur, Malaysia. The 18 teams were drawn into five groups: three comprising four teams from the West each (Groups A–C) and two involving three teams from the East each (Groups D–E). Teams were seeded into pots: four pots for West region and three pots for East region, and drawn into the relevant positions within each group, based on their association ranking. Teams from the same association could not be drawn into the same group. Teams of every group will play at a neutral venue of a single-legged tie against every opponent.

Location of the 2024–25 AFC Challenge League group stage teams
Brown: Group A; Cyan: Group B; Orange: Group C; Yellow: Group D; Red: Group E

=== West Region ===
==== Group A ====
| Pos | Team | Pld | W | D | L | GF | GA | GD | Pts | Qualification | EAB | NJM | PAR | BSK |
|---|---|---|---|---|---|---|---|---|---|---|---|---|---|---|
| 1 | (India) East Bengal | 3 | 2 | 1 | 0 | 9 | 4 | +5 | 7 | Advance to Quarter-finals | | 3–2 | 2–2 | |
| 2 | (Lebanon) Nejmeh | 3 | 2 | 0 | 1 | 5 | 4 | +1 | 6 | | | | | 1–0 |
| 3 | (Bhutan) Paro (H) | 3 | 1 | 1 | 1 | 5 | 5 | 0 | 4 | | | 1–2 | | |
| 4 | (Bangladesh) Bashundhara Kings | 3 | 0 | 0 | 3 | 1 | 7 | −6 | 0 | | 0–4 | | 1–2 | |

Source: AFC
(H) Hosts

==== Group B ====
| Pos | Team | Pld | W | D | L | GF | GA | GD | Pts | Qualification | AKG | AAK | ABD | MAZ |
|---|---|---|---|---|---|---|---|---|---|---|---|---|---|---|
| 1 | (Turkmenistan) Arkadag | 3 | 2 | 0 | 1 | 6 | 4 | +2 | 6 (Note: Head-to-head goal difference: Arkadag +1; Al-Arabi 0; Abdysh-Ata Kant –1.) | Advance to Quarter-finals | | | | 2–1 |
| 2 | (Kuwait) Al-Arabi (H) | 3 | 2 | 0 | 1 | 5 | 3 | +2 | 6 | Advance to Quarter-finals | 3–2 | | 0–1 | |
| 3 | (Kyrgyzstan) Abdysh-Ata Kant | 3 | 2 | 0 | 1 | 4 | 2 | +2 | 6 | | 0–2 | | | |
| 4 | (Maldives) Maziya | 3 | 0 | 0 | 3 | 1 | 7 | −6 | 0 | | | 0–2 | 0–3 | |

Source: AFC
(H) Hosts

==== Group C ====
| Pos | Team | Pld | W | D | L | GF | GA | GD | Pts | Qualification | ASB | AAM | AFT | HAQ |
|---|---|---|---|---|---|---|---|---|---|---|---|---|---|---|
| 1 | (Oman) Al-Seeb (H) | 3 | 3 | 0 | 0 | 9 | 0 | +9 | 9 | Advance to Quarter-finals | | 1–0 | | 3–0 |
| 2 | (Bahrain) Al-Ahli Club | 3 | 0 | 2 | 1 | 1 | 2 | −1 | 2 (Note: Head-to-head goals scored: Al-Ahli Club 1, Al-Fotuwa 1, Hilal Al-Quds 0; Overall goal difference: Al-Ahli Club –1, Al-Fotuwa –5.) | | | | 1–1 | 0–0 |
| 3 | (Syria) Al-Fotuwa | 3 | 0 | 2 | 1 | 1 | 6 | −5 | 2 | | 0–5 | | | |
| 4 | (Palestine) Hilal Al-Quds | 3 | 0 | 2 | 1 | 0 | 3 | −3 | 2 | | | | 0–0 | |

Source: AFC
(H) Hosts

==== Ranking of runners-up teams ====
| Pos | Grp | Team | Pld | W | D | L | GF | GA | GD | Pts | Qualification |
|---|---|---|---|---|---|---|---|---|---|---|---|
| 1 | B | (Kuwait) Al-Arabi | 3 | 2 | 0 | 1 | 5 | 3 | +2 | 6 | Advance to Quarter-finals |
| 2 | A | (Lebanon) Nejmeh | 3 | 2 | 0 | 1 | 5 | 4 | +1 | 6 | |
| 3 | C | (Bahrain) Al-Ahli Club | 3 | 0 | 2 | 1 | 1 | 2 | −1 | 2 | |

Source: AFC

=== East Region ===
==== Group D ====
| Pos | Team | Pld | W | D | L | GF | GA | GD | Pts | Qualification | SNU | TNC | YEP |
|---|---|---|---|---|---|---|---|---|---|---|---|---|---|
| 1 | (Myanmar) Shan United (H) | 2 | 1 | 1 | 0 | 4 | 2 | +2 | 4 | Advance to Quarter-finals | | 2–2 | |
| 2 | (Chinese Taipei) Tainan City | 2 | 1 | 1 | 0 | 5 | 4 | +1 | 4 | Advance to Quarter-finals | | | 3–2 |
| 3 | (Laos) Young Elephants | 2 | 0 | 0 | 2 | 2 | 5 | −3 | 0 | | 0–2 | | |

Source: AFC
(H) Hosts

==== Group E ====
| Pos | Team | Pld | W | D | L | GF | GA | GD | Pts | Qualification | MDU | SVR | SPF |
|---|---|---|---|---|---|---|---|---|---|---|---|---|---|
| 1 | (Indonesia) Madura United | 2 | 1 | 1 | 0 | 2 | 1 | +1 | 4 | Advance to Quarter-finals | | 2–1 | |
| 2 | (Cambodia) Svay Rieng | 2 | 1 | 0 | 1 | 3 | 3 | 0 | 3 | Advance to Quarter-finals | | | 2–1 |
| 3 | (Mongolia) SP Falcons (H) | 2 | 0 | 1 | 1 | 1 | 2 | −1 | 1 | | 0–0 | | |

Source: AFC
(H) Hosts

== Knockout stage ==
=== Bracket ===
Quarter-finals
E2 | (Cambodia) Svay Rieng | 6 | 1 | 7
D1 | (Myanmar) Shan United | 2 | 2 | 4
East Region
D2 | (Chinese Taipei) Tainan City | 0 | 0 | 0
E1 | (Indonesia) Madura United | 0 | 3 | 3
B2 | (Kuwait) Al-Arabi (a.e.t.) | 1 | 2 | 3
C1 | (Oman) Al-Seeb | 0 | 2 | 2
West Region
A1 | (India) East Bengal | 0 | 1 | 1
B1 | (Turkmenistan) Arkadag | 1 | 2 | 3

Semi-finals
(Cambodia) Svay Rieng | 3 | 3 | 6
(Indonesia) Madura United | 0 | 3 | 3
(Kuwait) Al-Arabi | 2 | 0 | 2
(Turkmenistan) Arkadag | 0 | 3 | 3

Final
(Cambodia) Svay Rieng | 1
(Turkmenistan) Arkadag (a.e.t.) | 2

=== Quarter-finals ===
In the quarter-finals, the eight qualified teams played in two ties, with the matchups and order of legs determined by the group stage draw and the identity of the best runners-up in the West region.

| Team 1 | Agg. | Team 2 | 1st leg | 2nd leg |
|---|---|---|---|---|
West Region
| Al-Arabi (Kuwait) | 3–2 | (Oman) Al-Seeb | 1–0 | 2–2 (a.e.t.) |
| East Bengal (India) | 1–3 | (Turkmenistan) Arkadag | 0–1 | 1–2 |
East Region
| Svay Rieng (Cambodia) | 7–4 | (Myanmar) Shan United | 6–2 | 1–2 |
| Tainan City (Chinese Taipei) | 0–3 | (Indonesia) Madura United | 0–0 | 0–3 |

=== Semi-finals ===
In the semi-finals, the winners of quarter-finals from each region faced each other in a two-legged tie. The winners of each tie advanced to the final.

| Team 1 | Agg. | Team 2 | 1st leg | 2nd leg |
|---|---|---|---|---|
West Region
| Al-Arabi (Kuwait) | 2–3 | (Turkmenistan) Arkadag | 2–0 | 0–3 |
East Region
| Svay Rieng (Cambodia) | 6–3 | (Indonesia) Madura United | 3–0 | 3–3 |

=== Final ===
In the final, the winners of the each semi-finals played each other, with the host team alternating every season. The winners would be given a direct slot for the 2025–26 AFC Champions League Two group stage, if not already qualified through the domestic performance.

10 May 2025
19:00 UTC+7

| Svay Rieng (Cambodia) | 1–2 (a.e.t.) | (Turkmenistan) Arkadag |
|---|---|---|
| Krya 82' | Report | Saparow 59'; Annadurdyýew 112' |

Morodok Techo National Stadium, Phnom Penh
Attendance: 51,610
Referee: Kim Hee-gon (South Korea)

== Top scorers ==
Team eliminated for this round.
Player is not in the team but the team is still active for this round.

| Rank | Player | Team | MD1 | MD2 | MD3 | QF1 | QF2 | SF1 | SF2 | F1 | Total |
|---|---|---|---|---|---|---|---|---|---|---|---|
| 1 | (Turkmenistan) Altymyrat Annadurdyýew | (Turkmenistan) Arkadag | 1 | | | | 2 | | 1 | 1 | 5 |
| 2 | (Greece) Dimitrios Diamantakos | (India) East Bengal | 1 | 1 | 2 | | | | | | 4 |
| 2 | (Brazil) Cristian Roque | (Cambodia) Svay Rieng | | 1 | | 3 | | | | | 4 |
| 2 | (Myanmar) Ye Yint Aung | (Myanmar) Shan United | 2 | | 1 | | 1 | | | | 4 |
| 2 | (Cambodia) Min Ratanak | (Cambodia) Svay Rieng | | | 1 | 1 | | 1 | 1 | | 4 |
| 6 | (Oman) Zahir Al-Aghbari | (Oman) Al Seeb | 2 | | 1 | | | | | | 3 |
| 7 | (Oman) Abdul Aziz Al-Muqbali | (Oman) Al Seeb | 1 | | 1 | | | | | | 2 |
| 7 | (Kuwait) Ali Khalaf | (Kuwait) Al Arabi | | | | | | | 2 | | 2 |
| 7 | (Turkmenistan) Şanazar Tirkişow | (Turkmenistan) Arkadag | | | | | | | 2 | | 2 |
| 7 | (Brazil) Toninho | (Chinese Taipei) Tainan City | | 1 | 1 | | | | | | 2 |
| 7 | (Indonesia) Brylian Aldama | (Laos) Young Elephants | | 2 | | | | | | | 2 |
| 7 | (Laos) Bounphachan Bounkong | (Cambodia) Svay Rieng | | | | | | 1 | 1 | | 2 |

Note

- Goals scored in the qualifying play-offs and matches voided by AFC are not counted when determining top scorer (Regulations Article 64.4)

== See also ==
- 2024–25 AFC Champions League Elite
- 2024–25 AFC Champions League Two
- 2024–25 AFC Women's Champions League
