= AFC Challenge League =

Annual third tier Asian club football competition

- Organiser(s): AFC
- Founded: 2005; 21 years ago (as AFC President's Cup); 2024; 2 years ago (relaunched as AFC Challenge League)
- Region: Asia
- Teams: 20 (group stage); 31 (total)
- Qualifier for: AFC Champions League Two
- Related competitions: AFC Champions League Elite (1st tier); AFC Champions League Two (2nd tier)
- Current champions: Kuwait SC (1st title)
- Most championships: (Tajikistan) Regar TadAZ (3 titles)
- Website: www.the-afc.com
- 2026–27 AFC Challenge League

The AFC Challenge League (abbreviated as ACGL) is an annual third-tier continental club football competition organised by the Asian Football Confederation. The competition is played among clubs from nations that do not receive qualifying slots to the league stage of top-tier AFC Champions League Elite or the group stage of second-tier AFC Champions League Two, based on the AFC club competitions ranking. The competition was initially launched by the AFC as the AFC President's Cup in 2005. The President's Cup was dissolved in 2014, and incorporated into the AFC Cup.

The 2024–25 season marked the inaugural edition of the rebranded AFC Challenge League, which featured a new format and an expanded group stage. The winners of the AFC Challenge League qualify for the group stage of the following season's AFC Champions League Two, while the runners-up qualify for the preliminary stage of the competition. Clubs from Tajikistan hold the highest number of titles (4), followed by Turkmenistan (3), Kyrgyzstan (2), Kuwait, Chinese Taipei, and Myanmar (1 each). The most successful side in the competition is Regar-TadAZ with three titles in the President's Cup era. The inaugural winners of the AFC Challenge League were Arkadag who defeated Svay Rieng by 2–1 in the 2025 final. Kuwait SC won the second edition, once again against Svay Rieng, by winning 4–3 in the 2026 final.

== History ==
Season	Winners
AFC President's Cup
2005	(Tajikistan) Regar TadAZ
2006	(Kyrgyzstan) Dordoi-Dynamo
2007	(Kyrgyzstan) Dordoi-Dynamo (2)
2008	(Tajikistan) Regar TadAZ (2)
2009	(Tajikistan) Regar TadAZ (3)
2010	(Myanmar) Yadanarbon
2011	(Chinese Taipei) Taipower
2012	(Tajikistan) Istiklol
2013	(Turkmenistan) Balkan
2014	(Turkmenistan) HTTU Aşgabat
AFC Challenge League
2024–25	(Turkmenistan) Arkadag
2025–26	Kuwait SC

The AFC President's Cup was founded in 2005 as a third tier competition so that clubs from lower-ranked AFC member nations could participate in continental competition. The inaugural edition of the tournament took place in 2005 and was hosted by Nepal. Regar-TadAZ won the first edition of the tournament, beating Dordoi-Dynamo 3–0 in the final. The two clubs would later face each other again in the 2008 and 2009 finals, with Regar-TadAZ winning each edition.

The tournament was initially dominated by clubs from Kyrgyzstan and Tajikistan, with clubs from the two nations winning the first five editions of the tournament. Kyrgyz side Dordoi-Dynamo featured in the final six years in a row from 2005 to 2010, winning twice in 2006 and 2007.

In 2010, Yadanarbon became the first club from Southeast Asia to win the tournament, beating Dordoi-Dynamo 1–0 after extra time.

On 25 November 2013, the AFC Competitions Committee proposed the year of 2014 to be the last edition of the President's Cup. Starting from 2015, league champions of emerging countries would be eligible to participate in the AFC Cup qualifying play-offs.

The last edition of the AFC President's Cup in 2014 saw HTTU Aşgabat defeat North Korean side Rimyongsu 2–1, becoming the second consecutive team from Turkmenistan to win the competition.

On 23 December 2022, it was announced that the AFC's club competitions would be restructured from the 2024–25 season. With the new third-tier tournament being named the AFC Challenge League. On 24 May 2024, AFC confirmed that records and statistics from the AFC President's Cup era would be grandfathered in with the AFC Challenge League.

Arkadag became the first club to win the AFC Challenge League, defeating Cambodian side Svay Rieng 2–1 after extra time in the 2025 final. The Turkmen club were making their debut in AFC club competitions, having been founded in 2023.

Kuwait SC became the second club to win the AFC Challenge League, defeating Cambodian side Svay Rieng 4–3 in the 2025–26 final. The match, held on May 13, 2026, at the Jaber Al-Ahmad International Stadium, saw Kuwait SC come from behind twice to secure the title in extra time.

== Format ==
As part of the AFC's Vision Asia document, the league champions from countries in the AFC's emerging nations participated in the competition.

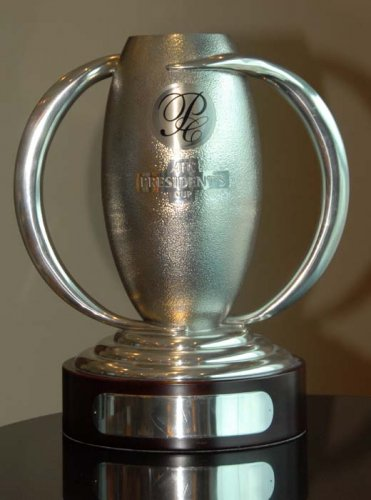
The AFC President's Cup trophy

Between 8 and 12 clubs participated in each edition of the competition. From 2005 to 2007, 8 clubs were placed in the two groups of 4. The winners and runners up would advance to the semi-final stage. All the matches were held in a single host country.

From 2008 to 2010, the tournament was increased to 11 clubs. A qualification round was created and clubs were split into three groups. Each group was played in a different country. The three group winners and the best ranked runner up qualified for the final stage.

From 2011 to 2014, the tournament expanded to 12 clubs. In the qualification round, there were three groups of four clubs, with the group winners and runners-up qualifying for the final stage. These six clubs were broken into two groups of three, with the group winner qualifying to the final.

In November 2013 the AFC announced that the 2014 AFC President's Cup would be the last edition of the tournament. Starting from 2015, league champions of "emerging countries" are eligible to participate in the AFC Cup qualifying play-off. The qualifying round for the 2016 AFC Cup, with similar format to the AFC President's Cup (without final stage), was held in August 2015, which qualified two clubs to the AFC Cup play-offs.

In its inaugural season, the Challenge League comprised 18 clubs in the group stage, divided into five groups of three or four. The clubs competed in single-leg centralized format, with the group winners and runners-up of the East Region, and the group winners and highest ranked runner-up of the West Region qualifying for the quarter-finals. The quarter and semi-finals are played over two legs, while the final is a single-leg contest hosted by one of the participating clubs. The 2025–26 edition featured 20 teams in the group stage, featuring five groups of four.

=== Allocation ===
The allocation of group stage teams by member country is listed below; asterisks represent occasions where at least one team was eliminated in the qualifying rounds. Countries that have not been represented in the group stage are not listed below.

Associations	Spots												
Associations	2005	2006	2007	2008	2009	2010	2011	2012	2013	2014	2024–25	2025–26	2026–27
East Asia
Brunei	0	0	0	0	0	0	0	0	0	0	0	0	1
Cambodia	1	1	1	1	1	1	1	1	1	1	1	2	0
Chinese Taipei	1	1	1	1	1	1	1	1	1	1	1	1*	2
Indonesia	0	0	0	0	0	0	0	0	0	0	1	1	1
Laos	0	0	0	0	0	0	0	0	0	0	1	1	0*
Mongolia	0	0	0	0	0	0	0	1	1	1	1	1*	0*
Myanmar	0	0	0	1	1	1	1	0	0	0	1	1*	2
North Korea	0	0	0	0	0	0	0	0	0	1	0	0	0
Philippines	0	0	0	0	0	0	0	0	1	1	0	1	2*
Total	2	2	2	3	3	3	3	3	4	5	6	8	8
West Asia
Bahrain	0	0	0	0	0	0	0	0	0	0	1	0	0
Bangladesh	0	0	0	1	1	1	1	1	1	1	1	1*	1*
Bhutan	1	1	1	1	1	1	1	1	1	1	1	1	1
India	0	0	0	0	0	0	0	0	0	0	1	0	1*
Kyrgyzstan	1	1	1	1	1	1	1	1	1	0	1	2	0*
Kuwait	0	0	0	0	0	0	0	0	0	0	1	2	2*
Lebanon	0	0	0	0	0	0	0	0	0	0	1	2	2
Maldives	0	0	0	0	0	0	0	0	0	0	1	0	0*
Nepal	1	1	1	1	1	1	1	1	1	1	0	0	0
Oman	0	0	0	0	0	0	0	0	0	0	1	2	0
Pakistan	1	1	1	1	1	1	1	1	1	1	0	0	0
Palestine	0	0	0	0	0	0	1	1	1	0	1	0	0
Sri Lanka	1	1	1	1	1	1	1	1	1	1	0	0	0
Tajikistan	1	1	1	1	1	1	1	1	0	0	0	1	2
Turkmenistan	0	0	0	1	1	1	1	1	1	1	1	1	1
Syria	0	0	0	0	0	0	0	0	0	0	1	0	2
Total	6	6	6	8	8	8	9	9	8	6	12	12	12
Total
Finals	8	8	8	11	11	11	12	12	12	11	18	20	20
Qualifying	0	0	0	0	0	0	0	0	0	0	4	18	18

== Prize money ==
Starting with the 2024–25 season, the distribution of the prize money is as follows:

Round	Teams	Amount	
Round	Teams	Per team	Total
Final (Champions)	1	$1 million	
Final (Runners-up)	1	$500,000	
Semi-finals	4	$120,000	$480,000
Quarter-finals	8	$80,000	$640,000
Group stage	18	$100,000	$1,800,000
Total	18	$4,420,000	

== Records and statistics ==
=== List of finals ===
- The "Season" column refers to the season during which the competition was held, and links to the article about that season.

List of AFC President's Cup and AFC Challenge League finals
Season	Winners	Score	Runners-up	Venue	Attendance	Ref.
AFC President's Cup (2005–2014)
2005	(Tajikistan) Regar-TadAZ	3–0	(Kyrgyzstan) Dordoi-Dynamo	Dashrath Stadium, Kathmandu, Nepal	8,000	
2006	(Kyrgyzstan) Dordoi-Dynamo	2–1 (a.e.t.)	(Tajikistan) Vakhsh	Sarawak Stadium, Kuching, Malaysia	500	
2007	(Kyrgyzstan) Dordoi-Dynamo	2–1	(Nepal) Mahendra Police Club	Punjab Stadium, Lahore, Pakistan	2,000	
2008	(Tajikistan) Regar-TadAZ	1–1 (4–3 p)	(Kyrgyzstan) Dordoi-Dynamo	Spartak Stadium, Bishkek, Kyrgyzstan	10,000	
2009	(Tajikistan) Regar-TadAZ	2–0	(Kyrgyzstan) Dordoi-Dynamo	Metallurg Stadium, Tursunzoda, Tajikistan	10,000	
2010	(Myanmar) Yadanarbon	1–0 (a.e.t.)	(Kyrgyzstan) Dordoi-Dynamo	Thuwunna Stadium, Yangon, Myanmar	23,720	
2011	(Chinese Taipei) Taiwan Power Company	3–2	(Cambodia) Phnom Penh Crown	National Stadium, Kaohsiung, Taiwan	3,238	
2012	(Tajikistan) Istiklol	2–1	(Palestine) Markaz Shabab Al-Am'ari	Central Republican Stadium, Dushanbe, Tajikistan	19,323	
2013	(Turkmenistan) Balkan	1–0	(Pakistan) KRL	Hang Jebat Stadium, Malacca, Malaysia	578	
2014	(Turkmenistan) HTTU Aşgabat	2–1	(North Korea) Rimyongsu	Sugathadasa Stadium, Colombo, Sri Lanka	200	
AFC Challenge League (2024–present)
2024–25	(Turkmenistan) Arkadag	2–1 (a.e.t.)	(Cambodia) Svay Rieng	Morodok Techo National Stadium, Phnom Penh, Cambodia	51,610	
2025–26	Kuwait SC	4–3 (a.e.t.)	(Cambodia) Svay Rieng	Jaber Al-Ahmad International Stadium, Kuwait City, Kuwait	43,366	

=== Performance by club ===
Performance in the AFC President's Cup and AFC Challenge League by club
Club	Title(s)	Runners-up	Years won	Years runner-up
(Tajikistan) Regar-TadAZ	3	0	2005, 2008, 2009	—
(Kyrgyzstan) Dordoi Bishkek	2	4	2006, 2007	2005, 2008, 2009, 2010
(Myanmar) Yadanarbon	1	0	2010	—
(Chinese Taipei) Taiwan Power Company	1	0	2011	—
(Tajikistan) Istiklol	1	0	2012	—
(Turkmenistan) Nebitçi	1	0	2013	—
(Turkmenistan) Ýedigen	1	0	2014	—
(Turkmenistan) Arkadag	1	0	2024–25	—
Kuwait SC	1	0	2025–26	—
(Cambodia) Svay Rieng	0	2	—	2024–25, 2025–26
(Tajikistan) Khatlon	0	1	—	2006
Nepal Police	0	1	—	2007
(Cambodia) Phnom Penh Crown	0	1	—	2011
(Palestine) Markaz Shabab Al-Am'ari	0	1	—	2012
(Pakistan) KRL	0	1	—	2013
(North Korea) Rimyongsu	0	1	—	2014

=== Performance by nation ===
Performance in finals by nation
Nation	Winners	Runners-up	Total
Tajikistan	4	1	5
Turkmenistan	3	0	3
Kyrgyzstan	2	4	6
Chinese Taipei	1	0	1
Myanmar	1	0	1
Kuwait	1	0	1
Cambodia	0	3	3
Nepal	0	1	1
North Korea	0	1	1
Pakistan	0	1	1
Palestine	0	1	1

=== Performance by coach ===
Coach	Club	Winners
(Tajikistan) Makhmadjon Khabibulloev	(Tajikistan) Regar TadAZ	2005, 2008, 2009
(Kyrgyzstan) Boris Podkorytov	(Kyrgyzstan) Dordoi-Dinamo	2006, 2007
(Myanmar) U Zaw Lay Aung	(Myanmar) Yadanarbon	2010
(Serbia) Nikola Kavazović	(Tajikistan) Istiklol	2012
(Chinese Taipei) Chen Kuei-jen	(Chinese Taipei) Taiwan Power Company	2011
(Turkmenistan) Rahym Kurbanmämmedow	(Turkmenistan) Balkan	2013
(Turkmenistan) Begench Garayev	(Turkmenistan) HTTU Aşgabat	2014
(Turkmenistan) Akhmet Allaberdiyev	(Turkmenistan) Arkadag	2024–25
(Montenegro) Nebojša Jovović	Kuwait SC	2025–26

== Awards ==
=== Top scorers ===
Season	Player(s)	Club(s)	Goals
2005	(Sri Lanka) Dudley Steinwall	(Sri Lanka) Blue Star SC	4
2005	(Cambodia) Hok Sochetra	(Cambodia) Hello United	4
2005	(Tajikistan) Khurshed Mahmudov	(Tajikistan) Regar-TadAZ	4
2005	(Tajikistan) Dzhomikhon Mukhidinov	(Tajikistan) Regar-TadAZ	4
2006	(Chinese Taipei) Chuang Yao-tsung	(Chinese Taipei) Tatung	5
2006	(Kyrgyzstan) Roman Kornilov	(Kyrgyzstan) Dordoi-Dynamo	5
2007	(Sri Lanka) Channa Ediri Bandanage	(Sri Lanka) Ratnam SC	6
2008	(Myanmar) Thi Ha Kyaw	(Myanmar) Kanbawza	6
2009	(Myanmar) Soe Min Oo	(Myanmar) Kanbawza	6
2010	(Tajikistan) Rustam Usmonov	(Tajikistan) Vakhsh Qurghonteppa	5
2011	(Chinese Taipei) Ho Ming-tsan	(Chinese Taipei) Taipower	6
2012	(Kyrgyzstan) Mirlan Murzayev	(Kyrgyzstan) Dordoi Bishkek	8
2013	(Kyrgyzstan) Mirlan Murzayev	(Kyrgyzstan) Dordoi Bishkek	9
2014	(Turkmenistan) Suleyman Muhadow	(Turkmenistan) HTTU Aşgabat	11
2024–25	(Turkmenistan) Altymyrat Annadurdyýew	(Turkmenistan) Arkadag	5
2025–26	(Ghana) Kwame Peprah	(Cambodia) PKR Svay Rieng	8

=== Best player ===
Season	Player	Club
2005	N/A	N/A
2006	N/A	N/A
2007	(Kyrgyzstan) Valery Kashuba	(Kyrgyzstan) Dordoi-Dynamo
2008	N/A	N/A
2009	(Tajikistan) Khurshed Mahmudov	(Tajikistan) Regar-TadAZ
2010	(Kyrgyzstan) Mirlan Murzayev	(Kyrgyzstan) Dordoi-Dynamo
2011	(Chinese Taipei) Chen Po-liang	(Chinese Taipei) Taipower
2012	(Tajikistan) Alisher Tuychiev	(Tajikistan) Istiklol
2013	(Turkmenistan) Amir Gurbani	(Turkmenistan) Balkan
2014	(Turkmenistan) Suleyman Muhadow	(Turkmenistan) HTTU Asgabat
2024–25	(Turkmenistan) Şanazar Tirkişow	(Turkmenistan) Arkadag
2025–26	(Egypt) Amoory	Kuwait SC

=== Top goalscorers ===
Rank	Player	Club(s)	Goals
1	(Kyrgyzstan) Mirlan Murzaev	Dordoi Bishkek	19
2	(Kyrgyzstan) David Tetteh	Dordoi Bishkek	12
3	(Tajikistan) Khurshed Makhmudov	Regar-TadAZ	11
3	(Turkmenistan) Suleyman Muhadow	HTTU	11
5	(Turkmenistan) Amir Gurbani	Aşgabat; Balkan	10
5	(Sri Lanka) Channa Ediri Bandanage	Ratnam	10
5	(Tajikistan) Ibrahim Rabimov	Regar-TadAZ; Istiklol	10
8	(Pakistan) Kaleemullah Khan	KRL	9
9	(Turkmenistan) Arslanmyrat Amanow	Aşgabat; HTTU	8
9	(Myanmar) Yan Paing	Yadanarbon	8
9	(Nepal) Ju Manu Rai	Nepal Police	8
9	(Ghana) Kwame Peprah	PKR Svay Rieng	8

== See also ==
- AFC President's Cup and AFC Challenge League records and statistics
- AFC Champions League Elite
- AFC Champions League Two
