= Turkmenistan national football team results =

The following is a list of official matches played by Turkmenistan national football team throughout its history.

== Matches ==
=== 1992 ===
28 June 1992 Central Asian Cup	Uzbekistan	2–1	Turkmenistan	Tashkent, Uzbekistan
	Ruzimov 8'; Abduraimov 75'		Zolotuhin 85'	Stadium: Pakhtakor Central Stadium

25 October 1992 Central Asian Cup	Turkmenistan	1–0	Uzbekistan	Ashgabat, Turkmenistan
	Muhadow 70'			Stadium: Köpetdag Stadium

=== 1993 ===
8 June 1993 1993 ECO Cup	Iran	2–1	Turkmenistan	Tehran, Iran
	Marfavi; Garousi	Report	Nurmyradow 82'	Stadium: Azadi Stadium; Attendance: 15,000; Referee: Ahmad Abharan (Iran)

14 June 1993 1993 ECO Cup F	Iran	2–1	Turkmenistan	Tehran, Iran
	Roosta; Marfavi	Report	Zolotuhin 12'	Stadium: Azadi Stadium; Attendance: 15,000; Referee: Ahmad Abharan (Iran)

=== 1994 ===
11 April 1994 Tashkent Tournament	Uzbekistan	4–0	Turkmenistan	Tashkent, Uzbekistan
	Maqsudov 45'; Marifaliev 47'; Abdullaev 53'; Khasanov 71'			Stadium: Pakhtakor Central Stadium

13 April 1994 Tashkent Tournament	Turkmenistan	5–1	Kyrgyzstan	Tashkent, Uzbekistan
				Stadium: Pakhtakor Central Stadium

15 April 1994 Tashkent Tournament	Kazakhstan	0–0	Turkmenistan	Tashkent, Uzbekistan
				Stadium: Pakhtakor Central Stadium

19 April 1994 Tashkent Tournament	Turkmenistan	2–0	Tajikistan	Tashkent, Uzbekistan
				Stadium: Pakhtakor Central Stadium

1 October 1994 1994 Asian Games	Turkmenistan	2–2	China	Hiroshima, Japan
	Nurmyradow 6'; Seýdiýew 89' (pen.)		Gao Feng 9'; Gao Zhongxun 69' (pen.)	Stadium: Hiroshima Regional Park Stadium

5 October 1994 1994 Asian Games	Iran	1–1	Turkmenistan	Onomichi, Japan
	68' (o.g.)		Muhadow 62'	Stadium: Bingo Stadium

7 October 1994 1994 Asian Games	Yemen	0–4	Turkmenistan	Hiroshima, Japan
			Muhadow 20', 55', 85'; Seýdiýew 30'	Stadium: Hiroshima Stadium

9 October 1994 1994 Asian Games	Bahrain	2–2	Turkmenistan	Miyoshi, Japan
	Al-Doseri 6'; Al-Marzouqi 21'		Annadurdyýew 54', 89'	Stadium: Athletic Stadium

11 October 1994 1994 Asian Games	Uzbekistan	3–0	Turkmenistan	Miyoshi, Japan
	Shkvyrin 14', 33'; Abduraimov 20' (pen.)			Stadium: Athletic Stadium

=== 1996 ===
10 March 1996 1996 ACQ	Turkmenistan	2–2	Kuwait	Ashgabat, Turkmenistan
	Urazow 3'; Plýuşenko 8'		Haji 13'; Al-Dawod 89'	Stadium: Nisa-Chandybil Stadium

22 March 1996 1996 ACQ	Kuwait	2–0	Turkmenistan	Kuwait City, Kuwait
	Sulaiman 18'; Bekheet 68'

26 April 1996 1996 ACQ	Turkmenistan	1–1	Iran	Ashgabat, Turkmenistan
	?	Report	Bagheri	Attendance: 10,000

28 April 1996 Friendly	Turkmenistan	1–0	Iran	Ashgabat, Turkmenistan
	Agaýew 28'	Report		Attendance: 10,000; Referee: Jalal Moradi (Iran)

12 May 1996 1996 AFC Asian Cup qualification	Lebanon	3–1	Turkmenistan	Beirut, Lebanon
	Nahza 28'; Taha 68'; Karnib 90'		Bondoýew 20'	Stadium: Beirut Municipal Stadium

26 May 1996 1996 ACQ	Turkmenistan	0–1	Lebanon	Ashgabat, Turkmenistan
			Ghazaryan 33'	Stadium: Nisa-Chandybil Stadium

25 November 1996 Friendly	Iran	0–1	Turkmenistan	Tehran, Iran
		Report	Şumilow 28'	Stadium: Azadi Stadium; Attendance: 15,000; Referee: Jalal Moradi (Iran)

=== 1997 ===
22 March 1997 Friendly	Azerbaijan	3–0	Turkmenistan	Baku, Azerbaijan
	Abishov 12'; Huseynov 86'; Gurbanov 88'			Stadium: Tofiq Bahramov Republican Stadium; Referee: Khagani Mamedov (Azerbaijan)

4 May 1997 1998 FWCQ R1	Turkmenistan	1–4	China	Ashgabat, Turkmenistan
	Meredow 90'	(Report)	Peng Weiguo 26', 39'; Gao Feng 78'; Li Bing 80'	Stadium: Nisa-Chandybil Stadium; Attendance: 3,000; Referee: Saeed Abdulla Ibrahim (United Arab Emirates)

11 May 1997 1998 FWCQ R1	Turkmenistan	2–1	Vietnam	Ashgabat, Turkmenistan
	Agabaýew 39'; Gulýan 53'	(Report)	Nguyễn Công Vinh 71'	Stadium: Nisa-Chandybil Stadium; Attendance: 2,500; Referee: Gyanu Shrestha (Nepal)

25 May 1997 1998 FWCQ R1	Turkmenistan	1–2	Tajikistan	Ashgabat, Turkmenistan
	Tkawadze 18'	(Report)	Knizaev 41', 49'	Stadium: Nisa-Chandybil Stadium; Attendance: 3,000; Referee: Inayath Ulla Khan (India)

1 June 1997 1998 FWCQ R1	China	1–0	Turkmenistan	Beijing, China
	Li Jinyu 81'	(Report)		Stadium: Workers Stadium; Attendance: 3,000; Referee: Yoshimi Ogawa (Japan)

8 June 1997 1998 FWCQ R1	Vietnam	0–4	Turkmenistan	Ho Chi Minh City, Vietnam
		(Report)	Agaýew 16', 57', 63'; Broşin 20'	Stadium: Thống Nhất Stadium; Attendance: 5,000; Referee: Kyaw U Kyaw (Myanmar)

22 June 1997 1998 FWCQ R1	Tajikistan	5–0	Turkmenistan	Dushanbe, Tajikistan
	Avakov 4', 26', 34'; Dzhaborov 14'; Mouminov 88'	(Report)		Stadium: Pamir Stadium; Attendance: 7,000; Referee: Nail Lutfullin (Uzbekistan)

=== 1998 ===
21 November 1998 Friendly	Thailand	3–3	Turkmenistan	Bangkok, Thailand
				Stadium: Supachalasai Stadium

30 November 1998 1998 Asian Games	Turkmenistan	2–0	Vietnam	Nakhon Sawan, Thailand
	Zawýalow 6'; Bondarenko 23'			Stadium: Nakhon Sawan Stadium

2 December 1998 1998 Asian Games	South Korea	2–3	Turkmenistan	Nakhon Sawan, Thailand
	Choi Yong-soo 2', 45'		Kislow 60', 90'; Agaýew 86'	Stadium: Nakhon Sawan Stadium

7 December 1998 1998 Asian Games	Turkmenistan	3–2	India	Bangkok, Thailand
	Neželew 39'; Agaýew 49'; Kislow 74'		Vijayan 83'; Rakshit 87'	Stadium: Supachalasai Stadium

9 December 1998 1998 Asian Games	North Korea	1–1	Turkmenistan	Bangkok, Thailand
	Ri Chang-ha 70'		Bondarenko 89'	Stadium: Supachalasai Stadium

11 December 1998 1998 Asian Games	Uzbekistan	1–1	Turkmenistan	Bangkok, Thailand
	Quttiboev 37'		Agabaýew 72'	Stadium: Supachalasai Stadium

14 December 1998 1998 Asian Games	Turkmenistan	0–3	China	Bangkok, Thailand
			Peremenin 46' (o.g.); Hao Haidong 59'; Li Jinyu 90'	Stadium: Supachalasai Stadium

=== 1999 ===
30 October 1999 Friendly	Turkmenistan	1–3	United Arab Emirates	Abu Dhabi, United Arab Emirates

1 November 1999 Friendly	Iraq	3–0	Turkmenistan	Abu Dhabi, United Arab Emirates

3 November 1999 Friendly	Estonia	1–1	Turkmenistan	Abu Dhabi, United Arab Emirates

=== 2000 ===
10 February 2000 2000 AFC Asian Cup qualification	Turkmenistan	1–6	Kuwait	Kuwait City, Kuwait

12 February 2000 2000 AFC Asian Cup qualification	Yemen	0–1	Turkmenistan	Kuwait City, Kuwait

14 February 2000 2000 AFC Asian Cup qualification	Turkmenistan	5–0	Nepal	Kuwait City, Kuwait

16 February 2000 2000 AFC Asian Cup qualification	Bhutan	0–8	Turkmenistan	Kuwait City, Kuwait

8 October 2000 Friendly	Uzbekistan	3–0	Turkmenistan	Tashkent, Uzbekistan

=== 2001 ===
23 April 2001 2002 FIFA World Cup qualification	Turkmenistan	2–0	Jordan	Tashkent, Uzbekistan

25 April 2001 2002 FIFA World Cup qualification	Uzbekistan	1–0	Turkmenistan	Tashkent, Uzbekistan

27 April 2001 2002 FIFA World Cup qualification	Chinese Taipei	0–5	Turkmenistan	Tashkent, Uzbekistan

3 May 2001 2002 FIFA World Cup qualification	Turkmenistan	2–5	Uzbekistan	Amman, Jordan

5 May 2001 2002 FIFA World Cup qualification	Jordan	1–2	Turkmenistan	Amman, Jordan

7 May 2001 2002 FIFA World Cup qualification	Turkmenistan	1–0	Chinese Taipei	Amman, Jordan

=== 2003 ===
19 October 2003 2004 AFC Asian Cup qualification	Turkmenistan	1–0	United Arab Emirates	Ashgabat, Turkmenistan

30 October 2003 2004 AFC Asian Cup qualification	United Arab Emirates	1–1	Turkmenistan	Sharjah, United Arab Emirates

9 November 2003 2004 AFC Asian Cup qualification	Turkmenistan	1–0	Sri Lanka	Balkanabat, Turkmenistan

12 November 2003 2004 AFC Asian Cup qualification	Sri Lanka	0–3	Turkmenistan	Ashgabat, Turkmenistan

19 November 2003 2006 FIFA World Cup qualification	Turkmenistan	11–0	Afghanistan	Ashgabat, Turkmenistan

23 November 2003 2006 FIFA World Cup qualification	Afghanistan	0–2	Turkmenistan	Kabul, Afghanistan

28 November 2003 2004 AFC Asian Cup qualification	Syria	1–1	Turkmenistan	Damascus, Syria

3 December 2003 2004 AFC Asian Cup qualification	Turkmenistan	3–0	Syria	Ashgabat, Turkmenistan

=== 2004 ===
18 February 2004 2006 FIFA World Cup qualification	Turkmenistan	2–0	Sri Lanka	Ashgabat, Turkmenistan

17 March 2004 Friendly	Yemen	1–2	Turkmenistan	Sana'a, Yemen

31 March 2004 2006 FIFA World Cup qualification	Turkmenistan	3–1	Indonesia	Ashgabat, Turkmenistan

28 April 2004 Friendly	Armenia	1–0	Turkmenistan	Yerevan, Armenia

31 May 2004 Friendly	Qatar	5–0	Turkmenistan	Doha, Qatar

9 June 2004 2006 FIFA World Cup qualification	Saudi Arabia	3–0	Turkmenistan	Riyadh, Saudi Arabia

18 July 2004 2004 AFC Asian Cup	Saudi Arabia	2–2	Turkmenistan	Chengdu, China

22 July 2004 2004 AFC Asian Cup	Turkmenistan	2–3	Iraq	Chengdu, China

26 July 2004 2004 AFC Asian Cup	Turkmenistan	0–1	Uzbekistan	Chongqing, China

8 September 2004 2006 FIFA World Cup qualification	Turkmenistan	0–1	Saudi Arabia	Ashgabat, Turkmenistan

9 October 2004 2006 FIFA World Cup qualification	Sri Lanka	2–2	Turkmenistan	Colombo, Sri Lanka

17 November 2004 2006 FIFA World Cup qualification	Indonesia	3–1	Turkmenistan	Jakarta, Indonesia

=== 2005 ===
29 January 2005 Friendly	Saudi Arabia	1–0	Turkmenistan	Riyadh, Saudi Arabia

3 August 2005 Friendly	Bahrain	5–0	Turkmenistan	Riffa, Bahrain

=== 2007 ===
25 June 2007 Friendly	Qatar	1–0	Turkmenistan	Doha, Qatar

22 August 2007 Friendly	Lithuania	2–1	Turkmenistan	Kaunas, Lithuania

11 October 2007 2010 FIFA World Cup qualification	Cambodia	0–1	Turkmenistan	Phnom Penh, Cambodia

28 October 2007 2010 FIFA World Cup qualification	Turkmenistan	4–1	Cambodia	Ashgabat, Turkmenistan

10 November 2007 2010 FIFA World Cup qualification	Hong Kong	0–0	Turkmenistan	Hong Kong

18 November 2007 2010 FIFA World Cup qualification	Turkmenistan	3–0	Hong Kong	Ashgabat, Turkmenistan

=== 2008 ===
6 February 2008 2010 FIFA World Cup qualification	South Korea	4–0	Turkmenistan	Seoul, South Korea

26 March 2008 2010 FIFA World Cup qualification	Turkmenistan	0–2	Jordan	Ashgabat, Turkmenistan

18 May 2008 Friendly	Oman	2–1	Turkmenistan	Nizwa, Oman

2 June 2008 2010 FIFA World Cup qualification	Turkmenistan	0–0	North Korea	Ashgabat, Turkmenistan

7 June 2008 2010 FIFA World Cup qualification	North Korea	1–0	Turkmenistan	Pyongyang, North Korea

14 June 2008 2010 FIFA World Cup qualification	Turkmenistan	1–3	South Korea	Ashgabat, Turkmenistan

22 June 2008 2010 FIFA World Cup qualification	Jordan	2–0	Turkmenistan	Amman, Jordan

30 July 2008 2008 AFC Challenge Cup	Turkmenistan	0–0	Tajikistan	Hyderabad, India

1 August 2008 2008 AFC Challenge Cup	Afghanistan	0–5	Turkmenistan	Hyderabad, India

3 August 2008 2008 AFC Challenge Cup	India	2–1	Turkmenistan	Hyderabad, India

3 October 2008 Friendly	Myanmar	1–2	Turkmenistan	Ho Chi Minh City, Vietnam

5 October 2008 Friendly	Vietnam	2–3	Turkmenistan	Ho Chi Minh City, Vietnam

=== 2009 ===
18 January 2009 Friendly	Syria	5–1	Turkmenistan	Kuwait City, Kuwait

20 January 2009 Friendly	Kuwait	2–0	Turkmenistan	Kuwait City, Kuwait

14 April 2009 2010 AFC Challenge Cup qualification	Maldives	1–3	Turkmenistan	Malé, Maldives

16 April 2009 2010 AFC Challenge Cup qualification	Turkmenistan	7–0	Bhutan	Malé, Maldives

18 April 2009 2010 AFC Challenge Cup qualification	Turkmenistan	5–0	Philippines	Malé, Maldives

20 October 2009 Friendly	Vietnam	1–0	Turkmenistan	Ho Chi Minh City, Vietnam

22 October 2009 Friendly	Singapore	4–2	Turkmenistan	Ho Chi Minh City, Vietnam

=== 2010 ===
17 February 2010 2010 AFC Challenge Cup	North Korea	1–1	Turkmenistan	Colombo, Sri Lanka

19 February 2010 2010 AFC Challenge Cup	Turkmenistan	1–0	Kyrgyzstan	Colombo, Sri Lanka

24 February 2010 2010 AFC Challenge Cup	Tajikistan	0–2	Turkmenistan	Colombo, Sri Lanka

27 February 2010 2010 AFC Challenge Cup	Turkmenistan	1–1 (4–5 p)	North Korea	Colombo, Sri Lanka

=== 2011 ===
21 March 2011 2012 AFC Challenge Cup qualification	Pakistan	0–3	Turkmenistan	Petaling Jaya, Malaysia

23 March 2011 2012 AFC Challenge Cup qualification	Chinese Taipei	0–2	Turkmenistan	Petaling Jaya, Malaysia

25 March 2011 2012 AFC Challenge Cup qualification	Turkmenistan	1–1	India	Petaling Jaya, Malaysia

23 July 2011 2014 FIFA World Cup qualification	Turkmenistan	1–1	Indonesia	Ashgabat, Turkmenistan

28 July 2011 2014 FIFA World Cup qualification	Indonesia	4–3	Turkmenistan	Jakarta, Indonesia

=== 2012 ===
27 January 2012 Friendly	Romania	4–0	Turkmenistan

8 March 2012 2012 AFC Challenge Cup	Turkmenistan	3–1	Maldives	Kathmandu, Nepal

10 March 2012 2012 AFC Challenge Cup	Palestine	0–0	Turkmenistan	Kathmandu, Nepal

12 March 2012 2012 AFC Challenge Cup	Nepal	0–3	Turkmenistan	Kathmandu, Nepal

16 March 2012 2012 AFC Challenge Cup	Turkmenistan	2–1	Philippines	Kathmandu, Nepal

19 March 2012 2012 AFC Challenge Cup	Turkmenistan	1–2	North Korea	Kathmandu, Nepal

24 October 2012 Friendly	Vietnam	0–1	Turkmenistan	Ho Chi Minh City, Vietnam

28 October 2012 Friendly	Turkmenistan	4–2	Laos	Ho Chi Minh City, Vietnam

=== 2013 ===
22 March 2013 2014 AFC Challenge Cup qualification	Turkmenistan	7–0	Cambodia	Manila, Philippines

26 March 2013 2014 AFC Challenge Cup qualification	Philippines	1–0	Turkmenistan	Manila, Philippines

=== 2014 ===
20 May 2014 2014 AFC Challenge Cup	Turkmenistan	5–1	Laos	Addu City, Maldives

22 May 2014 2014 AFC Challenge Cup	Afghanistan	3–1	Turkmenistan	Addu City, Maldives

24 May 2014 2014 AFC Challenge Cup	Turkmenistan	0–2	Philippines	Malé, Maldives

=== 2015 ===
11 June 2015 2018 FIFA World Cup qualification	Guam	1–0	Turkmenistan

16 June 2015 2018 FIFA World Cup qualification	Turkmenistan	1–1	Iran

3 September 2015 2018 FIFA World Cup qualification	Oman	3–1	Turkmenistan

8 October 2015 2018 FIFA World Cup qualification	Turkmenistan	2–1	India

13 October 2015 2018 FIFA World Cup qualification	Turkmenistan	1–0	Guam

5 November 2015 Friendly	United Arab Emirates	5–1	Turkmenistan

12 November 2015 2018 FIFA World Cup qualification	Iran	3–1	Turkmenistan

17 November 2015 2018 FIFA World Cup qualification	Turkmenistan	2–1	Oman

=== 2016 ===
29 March 2016 2018 FIFA World Cup qualification	India	1–2	Turkmenistan	Kochi, India

8 August 2016 Friendly	Oman	1–0	Turkmenistan	Muscat, Oman

11 October 2016 Friendly	Kyrgyzstan	1–0	Turkmenistan	Bishkek, Kyrgyzstan

9 November 2016 Friendly	Tajikistan	3–0	Turkmenistan	Dushanbe, Tajikistan

=== 2017 ===
26 March 2017 2019 AFC Asian Cup qualification	Chinese Taipei	1–3	Turkmenistan

13 June 2017 2019 AFC Asian Cup qualification	Turkmenistan	1–2	Bahrain

23 August 2017 Friendly	Qatar	2–1	Turkmenistan

5 September 2017 2019 AFC Asian Cup qualification	Singapore	1–1	Turkmenistan

10 October 2017 2019 AFC Asian Cup qualification	Turkmenistan	2–1	Singapore

14 November 2017 2019 AFC Asian Cup qualification	Turkmenistan	2–1	Chinese Taipei

=== 2018 ===
27 March 2018 2019 AFC Asian Cup qualification	Bahrain	4–0	Turkmenistan	Riffa, Bahrain
19:00 UTC+3	Helal 12', 24'; Issa 64'; Yaser 67'	Report		Stadium: Bahrain National Stadium; Attendance: 100; Referee: Yaqoob Abdul Baki (Oman)

25 December 2018 Friendly	Afghanistan	0–2	Turkmenistan	Antalya, Turkey
		Report	Orazsähedow 48'; Annagulyýew 51'	Stadium: Miracle Resort Hotel Training Center - Stadium; Attendance: 150

=== 2019 ===
9 January 2019 2019 AFC Asian Cup	Japan	3–2	Turkmenistan	Abu Dhabi, United Arab Emirates
15:00 (UTC+4)	Osako 56', 60'; Doan 71'	Report	Amanow 26'; Ataýew 79' (pen.)	Stadium: Al Nahyan Stadium; Attendance: 5,725; Referee: Alireza Faghani (Iran)

13 January 2019 2019 AFC Asian Cup	Turkmenistan	0–4	Uzbekistan	Dubai, United Arab Emirates
20:00 (UTC+4)		Report	Sidikov 17'; Shomurodov 24', 42'; Masharipov 40'	Stadium: Rashid Stadium; Attendance: 4,354; Referee: Ammar Al-Jeneibi (United Arab Emirates)

17 January 2019 2019 AFC Asian Cup	Oman	3–1	Turkmenistan	Abu Dhabi, United Arab Emirates
17:30 (UTC+4)	Kano 20'; Al-Ghassani 84'; Al-Musalami 90+4'	Report	Annadurdyýew 41'	Stadium: Mohammed bin Zayed Stadium; Referee: Nawaf Shukralla (Bahrain)

9 June 2019 Friendly	Uganda	0–0	Turkmenistan	Abu Dhabi, UAE
		Report (Turkmenportal)		Stadium: New York University Abu Dhabi; Referee: Hamad Ali Al Ali (UAE)

5 September 2019 2022 FWCQ R2	Sri Lanka	0–2	Turkmenistan	Colombo, Sri Lanka
19:30 (UTC+5:30)		Report (FIFA); Report (AFC)	Orazsähedow 8'; Amanow 53'	Stadium: Colombo Racecourse; Referee: Mohammed Al-Hoish (Saudi Arabia)

10 September 2019 2022 FWCQ R2	Turkmenistan	0–2	South Korea	Ashgabat
19:00 (UTC+5)		Report (FIFA); Report (AFC)	Na Sang-ho 13'; Jung Woo-young 82'	Stadium: Köpetdag Stadium; Referee: Ammar Al-Jeneibi (United Arab Emirates)

10 October 2019 2022 FWCQ R2	Lebanon	2–1	Turkmenistan	Beirut, Lebanon
19:00 UTC+3	El-Helwe 5'; Matar 64'	Report (FIFA); Report (AFC)	Annadurdyýew 62'	Stadium: Camille Chamoun Sports City Stadium; Attendance: 5,000; Referee: Takuto Okabe (Japan)

15 October 2019 Friendly	Kuwait	1–1	Turkmenistan	Kuwait City, Kuwait
19:00 UTC+4	Al Hebaiter 81'	Report	Amanow 70'	Stadium: Al Kuwait Sports Club Stadium

14 November 2019 2022 FWCQ R2	Turkmenistan	3–1	North Korea	Ashgabat, Turkmenistan
16:00 UTC+5	Titow 23'; Amanow 73'; Orazsähedow 88'	Report (FIFA); Report (AFC)	Han Kwang-song 90+3'	Stadium: Köpetdag Stadium; Attendance: 26,100; Referee: Sivakorn Pu-udom (Thailand)

19 November 2019 2022 FWCQ R2	Turkmenistan	2–0	Sri Lanka	Ashgabat, Turkmenistan
16:00 UTC+5	Bäşimow 44'; Annadurdyýew 59'	Report (FIFA); Report (AFC)		Stadium: Köpetdag Stadium; Attendance: 26,300; Referee: Saoud Al-Adba (Qatar)

=== 2021 ===
5 June 2021 2022 FWCQ R2	South Korea	5–0	Turkmenistan	Goyang, South Korea
20:00 UTC+9	Hwang Ui-jo 9', 72'; Nam Tae-hee 45+2'; Kim Young-gwon 56'; Kwon Chang-hoon 62'	Report		Stadium: Goyang Stadium; Attendance: 3,932; Referee: Turki Al-Khudhayr (Saudi Arabia)

9 June 2021 2022 FWCQ R2	Turkmenistan	3–2	Lebanon	Goyang, South Korea
15:00 UTC+9	Babajanow 59'; Annagulyýew 85'; Annadurdyýew 90+1'	Report	Ataya 73'; Saad 75'	Stadium: Goyang Stadium; Attendance: 52; Referee: Hanna Hattab (Syria)

15 June 2021 2022 FWCQ R2	North Korea	Cancelled	Turkmenistan	Goyang, South Korea
15:00 UTC+9		Report		Stadium: Goyang Stadium

=== 2022 ===
27 May 2022 Friendly	Thailand	1–0	Turkmenistan	Sisaket, Thailand
17:30 UTC+7	Kraisorn 88'	Report		Stadium: Sri Nakhon Lamduan Stadium

8 June 2022 2023 Asian Cup qualification	Turkmenistan	1–3	Malaysia	Kuala Lumpur, Malaysia
21:00 UTC+3	Annadurdyýew 37'	Report	Safawi 11'; Faisal 16'; Corbin-Ong 45+2'	Stadium: Bukit Jalil National Stadium; Attendance: 21591; Referee: Omar Al-Yaqoubi (Oman)

11 June 2022 2023 Asian Cup qualification	Bangladesh	1–2	Turkmenistan	Kuala Lumpur, Malaysia
17:15 UTC+8	Ibrahim 12'	Report	Annadurdyýew 7'; Amanow 77'	Stadium: Bukit Jalil National Stadium; Attendance: 5,598; Referee: Clifford Daypuyat (Philippines)

14 June 2022 2023 Asian Cup qualification	Bahrain	1–0	Turkmenistan	Kuala Lumpur, Malaysia
17:15 UTC+8	Helal 23' (pen.)	Report		Stadium: Bukit Jalil National Stadium; Attendance: 2,970; Referee: Nivon Robesh Gamini (Sri Lanka)

=== 2023 ===
23 March Friendly	Malaysia	1–0	Turkmenistan	Johor, Malaysia
20:30 UTC+8	Akhyar 28'	Report		Stadium: Sultan Ibrahim Stadium

11 June 2023 CAFA Nations Cup	Tajikistan	1–1	Turkmenistan	Tashkent, Uzbekistan
	Khamrokulov 86'		Annaýew 57'	Stadium: Pakhtakor Stadium; Referee: Akhrol Riskullaev (Uzbekistan)

14 June 2023 CAFA Nations Cup	Turkmenistan	0–2	Uzbekistan	Tashkent, Uzbekistan
20:30 UTC+5		Report	Shomurodov 52', 86'	Stadium: Milliy Stadium; Attendance: 14,410; Referee: Nurzatbek Abdykadyrov (Kyrgyzstan)

17 June 2023 CAFA Nations Cup	Turkmenistan	0–2	Oman	Tashkent, Uzbekistan
			Mushaifri 42'; Subhi 76'	Stadium: Pakhtakor Stadium; Attendance: 126; Referee: Dayirbek Abdilaev (Kyrgyzstan)

8 September Friendly	Indonesia	2–0	Turkmenistan	Surabaya, Indonesia
19:30 UTC+7	Dendy 19'; Egy 90+1'			Stadium: Gelora Bung Tomo Stadium; Attendance: 13,814; Referee: Muhammad Usaid bin Jamal (Malaysia)

12 September Friendly	Bahrain	1–1	Turkmenistan	Dubai, United Arab Emirates
20:00 UTC+4	Marhoon 13'	Report	Çaryýew 29'	Stadium: Police Officers Club Stadium

16 November 2026 WCQ / 2027 ACQ R2	Turkmenistan	1–3	Uzbekistan	Ashgabat, Turkmenistan
20:00 UTC+8	Durdyýew 44'	Report (FIFA); Report (AFC)	Shukurov 57', 77'; Shomurodov 90+1'	Stadium: Köpetdag Stadium; Attendance: 19,500; Referee: Hiroyuki Kimura (Japan)

21 November 2026 WCQ / 2027 ACQ R2	Hong Kong	2–2	Turkmenistan	Hong Kong
20:00 UTC+8	Wong Wai 12'; Camargo 65'	Report (FIFA); Report (AFC)	Mingazow 4', 36'	Stadium: Hong Kong Stadium; Attendance: 6,601; Referee: Adel Al-Naqbi (United Arab Emirates)

=== 2024 ===
21 March 2026 WCQ / 2027 ACQ R2	Iran	5–0	Turkmenistan	Tehran, Iran
19:30 UTC+3	Kanaani 10', 48'; Azmoun 13'; Mohebi 56'; Noorafkan 90+2'	Report		Stadium: Azadi Stadium; Attendance: 23,109; Referee: Yusuke Araki (Japan)

26 March 2026 WCQ / 2027 ACQ R2	Turkmenistan	0–1	Iran	Ashgabat, Turkmenistan
20:00 UTC+5		Report	Ghayedi 45+5'	Stadium: Köpetdag Stadium; Attendance: 10,230; Referee: Sivakorn Pu-udom (Thailand)

6 June 2026 World Cup qualification	Uzbekistan	3–1	Turkmenistan	Tashkent, Uzbekistan
19:30 UTC+5	Aliqulov 17'; Urunov 29'; Nasrullaev 70'	Report (FIFA); Report (AFC)	Tirkişow 25'	Stadium: Milliy Stadium; Attendance: 27,306; Referee: Yusuke Araki (Japan)

11 June 2026 World Cup qualification	Turkmenistan	0–0	Hong Kong	Ashgabat, Turkmenistan
20:00 UTC+5		Report		Stadium: Ashgabat Stadium; Attendance: 10,324; Referee: Hussein Abo Yehia (Lebanon)

10 October Friendly	Malta	Cancelled	Turkmenistan	Ta' Qali, Malta
19:00 UTC+2				Stadium: National Stadium
Note: Match cancelled due to travel issues faced by Turkmenistan.

=== 2025 ===
25 March 2025 2027 AFC Asian Cup Q	Chinese Taipei	1–2	Turkmenistan	Kaohsiung, Taiwan
18:30 UTC+8	Kouamé 48'	Report Report (AFC)	Tagayew 64'; Gurbanow 83'	Stadium: National Stadium; Attendance: 1,897; Referee: Abdulhadi Al-Ruaile (Qatar)

10 June 2025 2027 AFC Asian Cup Q	Turkmenistan	3–1	Thailand	Ashgabat, Turkmenistan
20:00 UTC+5	Titow 1'; Saparmämmedow 37'; Saparow 66'	Report Report (AFC)	Supachai 35'	Stadium: Ashgabat Stadium; Attendance: 15,545; Referee: Ismaeel Habib Ali (Bahrain)

30 August 2025 2025 CAFA Nations Cup	Kyrgyzstan	1–1	Turkmenistan	Tashkent, Uzbekistan
17:00 UTC+5	Kojo 45'	GSA Report	Jumaýew 44'	Stadium: JAR Stadium; Referee: Sajëçon Zajniddinov (Tajikistan)

2 September 2025 2025 CAFA Nations Cup	Turkmenistan	1–2	Uzbekistan	Tashkent, Uzbekistan
19:30 UTC+5	Durdyýew 84' (pen.)	GSA Report	Sergeev 37', 44' (pen.)	Stadium: Olympic City Stadium; Attendance: 2,037; Referee: Abdullo Davlatov (Tajikistan)

5 September 2025 2025 CAFA Nations Cup	Turkmenistan	1–2	Oman	Tashkent, Uzbekistan
17:00 UTC+5	Ballakow 51'	GSA Report	Ahallyýew 12' (o.g.); Al Ghassani 90+3'	Stadium: JAR Stadium; Referee: Vahid Kazemi (Iran)

9 October 2027 AFC Asian Cup Q	Sri Lanka	1–0	Turkmenistan	Colombo, Sri Lanka
15:45 UTC+5:30	Perera 67'	Report Report (AFC)		Stadium: Colombo Racecourse; Attendance: 2,440; Referee: Tam Ping Wun (Hong Kong)

14 October 2027 AFC Asian Cup Q	Turkmenistan	2–1	Sri Lanka	Arkadag, Turkmenistan
18:45 UTC+5	Tagaýew 52'; Saparow 57'	Report Report (AFC)	Annagulyýew 65' (o.g.)	Stadium: Arkadag Stadium; Attendance: 10,000; Referee: Asker Nadjafaliyev (Uzbekistan)

18 November 2027 AFC Asian Cup Q	Turkmenistan	3–1	Chinese Taipei	Arkadag, Turkmenistan
18:45 UTC+5	Myratberdiýew 13'; Tagaýew 53'; Diniýew 78'	Report Report (AFC)	Kouamé 45+2'	Stadium: Arkadag Stadium; Attendance: 10,000; Referee: Yousif Saeed Hasan (Iraq)

=== 2026 ===
31 March 2027 AFC Asian Cup Q	Thailand	2–1	Turkmenistan	Bangkok, Thailand
19:30 UTC+7	Suphanan 14'; Bihr 89'	Report; Report (AFC)	Çaryýew 60'	Stadium: Rajamangala Stadium; Attendance: 37,373; Referee: Shen Yinhao (China)
