= 1993 Commonwealth of Independent States Cup =

CIS Cup, Кубок Содружества 1993

Tournament details
- Host country: Russia
- Dates: 25–31 January 1993
- Teams: 15
- Venue: 3 (in 1 host city)

Final positions
- Champions: (Russia) Spartak Moscow (1st title)

Tournament statistics
- Matches played: 23
- Goals scored: 103 (4.48 per match)
- Attendance: 29,900 (1,300 per match)
- Top scorer(s): (Georgia (country)) Shota Arveladze (5 goals)

The 1993 Commonwealth of Independent States Cup was the first edition of the competition between the champions of former republics of Soviet Union. It was won by Spartak Moscow who defeated Belarusian side Belarus Minsk in the final.

== Participants ==
Team	Qualification	Participation
(Russia) Spartak Moscow	1992 Russian Top League champions	1st
Belarus Minsk	1992–93 Belarusian Premier League 2nd team as of the winter break^{1}	1st
(Lithuania) Ekranas Panevėžys	1992–93 LFF Lyga 1st team as of the winter break	1st
(Latvia) Skonto Riga	1992 Latvian Higher League champions	1st
(Estonia) Norma Tallinn	1992 Meistriliiga champions	1st
(Moldova) Zimbru Chișinău	1992 Moldovan National Division champions	1st
(Georgia (country)) Dinamo Tbilisi	1991–92 Umaglesi Liga champions	1st
(Azerbaijan) Neftchi Baku	1992 Azerbaijan Top League champions	1st
(Armenia) Homenetmen Yerevan	1992 Armenian Premier League champions^{2}	1st
(Kazakhstan) Kairat Almaty	1992 Kazakhstan Premier League champions	1st
(Uzbekistan) Pakhtakor Tashkent	1992 Uzbek League champions^{3}	1st
(Tajikistan) Regar Tursunzoda	1992 Tajik League runners-up^{4}	1st
(Kyrgyzstan) Alga Bishkek	1992 Kyrgyzstan League champions	1st
(Turkmenistan) Köpetdag Aşgabat	1992 Ýokary Liga champions	1st
Russia U19 national team	Unofficial entry, not eligible to advance past group stage.^{5}	1st

^{1} Belarus Minsk (formerly a reserve team for Dinamo Minsk) replaced 1992 champions Dinamo Minsk, whose almost entire squad at the same time traveled to play friendly matches in South America as a part of Belarus national football team.
^{2} Homenetmen Yerevan were one of two teams equally declared 1992 Armenian champions along with Shirak.
^{3} Pakhtakor Tashkent were one of two teams equally declared 1992 Uzbekistan champions along with Neftchi Fergana.
^{4} Regar Tursunzoda replaced champions Pamir Dushanbe, who refused to participate.
^{5} Due to political situation in Crimea and Black Sea area, Tavriya Simferopol (1992 Ukrainian champions) were originally drawn into Group C. They were not allowed to compete by Football Federation of Ukraine and were replaced by unofficial participants Russia U19 national team.

== Group stage ==
=== Group A ===
Team	Pld	W	D	L	GF	GA	GD	Pts
(Russia) Spartak Moscow	2	2	0	0	15	0	+15	4
(Latvia) Skonto Riga	2	1	0	1	1	7	−6	2
(Azerbaijan) Neftchi Baku	2	0	0	2	0	9	−9	0

==== Results ====
25 January 1993

Neftchi Baku (Azerbaijan)	0 – 1	(Latvia) Skonto Riga
		Astafjevs 75'

CSKA Palace of Sports, Moscow
Attendance: 1,000
Referee: Valeri Butenko (Russia)

26 January 1993

Spartak Moscow (Russia)	7 – 0	(Latvia) Skonto Riga
Bestchastnykh 14'; Tsymbalar 15'; Radchenko 43' (pen.), 57'; Pisarev 52'; Cherenkov 85' (pen.); Tikhonov 90'

CSKA Palace of Sports, Moscow
Attendance: 4,000
Referee: Vadim Zhuk (Belarus)

27 January 1993

Spartak Moscow (Russia)	8 – 0	(Azerbaijan) Neftchi Baku
Khelstov 6'; Karpin 22', 76', 81'; Lediakhov 42'; Azimov 53' (o.g.); Pyatnitsky 78'; Pisarev 83'

CSKA Palace of Sports, Moscow
Attendance: 4,300
Referee: Vladimir Direktorenko (Latvia)

=== Group B ===
Team	Pld	W	D	L	GF	GA	GD	Pts
(Georgia (country)) Dinamo Tbilisi	3	2	1	0	10	5	+5	5
(Turkmenistan) Köpetdag Aşgabat	3	1	1	1	9	6	+3	3
(Uzbekistan) Pakhtakor Tashkent	3	1	1	1	8	9	−1	3
(Moldova) Zimbru Chișinău	3	0	1	2	5	12	−7	1

==== Results ====
25 January 1993

Dinamo Tbilisi (Georgia (country))	5 – 2	(Uzbekistan) Pakhtakor Tashkent
Sh.Arveladze 15', 73'; Kinkladze 39'; Kavelashvili 60'; Rekhviashvili 74'		Kechinov 75'; Khodiyev 89'

Dynamo Manage, Moscow
Attendance: 500
Referee: Vadim Zhuk (Belarus)
25 January 1993

Zimbru Chișinău (Moldova)	1 – 6	(Turkmenistan) Köpetdag Aşgabat
Nani 66'		Muhadow 6', 26'; Mingazow 40'; Kirillov 44'; Nurmyradow 79' (pen.); Korzh 89'

Dynamo Manage, Moscow
Attendance: 300
Referee: Yuri Chebotarev (Russia)

26 January 1993

Pakhtakor Tashkent (Uzbekistan)	3 – 1	(Turkmenistan) Köpetdag Aşgabat
Qosimov 54', 61'; Kechinov 66' (pen.)		Nurmyradow 23'

Dynamo Manage, Moscow
Attendance: 400
Referee: Vladimir Ovchinnikov (Russia)
26 January 1993

Dinamo Tbilisi (Georgia (country))	3 – 1	(Moldova) Zimbru Chișinău
Sh.Arveladze 7', 48'; Inalishvili 52'		Nani 29'

Dynamo Manage, Moscow
Attendance: 500
Referee: Nikolai Levnikov (Russia)

27 January 1993

Dinamo Tbilisi (Georgia (country))	2 – 2	(Turkmenistan) Köpetdag Aşgabat
Kavelashvili 11'; Sh.Arveladze 82'		Nurmyradow 30'; A.Meredow 72'

CSKA Palace of Sports, Moscow
Attendance: 2,000
Referee: Valeri Butenko (Russia)
27 January 1993

Pakhtakor Tashkent (Uzbekistan)	3 – 3	(Moldova) Zimbru Chișinău
Kechinov 12', 24'; Qosimov 36'		Cleșcenco 22', 65', 80'

Spartak Manege, Moscow
Attendance: 150
Referee: Gevorg Hovhannisyan (Armenia)

=== Group C ===
- Unofficial table

Team	Pld	W	D	L	GF	GA	GD	Pts
(Lithuania) Ekranas Panevėžys	3	2	1	0	7	2	+5	5
Russia U19	3	2	0	1	8	3	+5	4
(Kazakhstan) Kairat Almaty	3	1	1	1	3	2	+1	3
(Kyrgyzstan) Alga Bishkek	3	0	0	3	4	12	−8	0

- Official table

Team	Pld	W	D	L	GF	GA	GD	Pts
(Lithuania) Ekranas Panevėžys	2	1	1	0	5	1	+4	3
(Kazakhstan) Kairat Almaty	2	1	1	0	3	2	+1	3
(Kyrgyzstan) Alga Bishkek	2	0	0	2	3	8	−5	0

==== Results ====
25 January 1993

Ekranas Panevėžys (Lithuania)	2 – 1	Russia U19
Poderis 2'; Vainoras 42' (pen.)		Chudin 49'

CSKA Palace of Sports, Moscow
Attendance: 2,000
Referee: Nikolay Obyedkov (Kazakhstan)
25 January 1993

Kairat Almaty (Kazakhstan)	3 – 2	(Kyrgyzstan) Alga Bishkek
Abildayev 16'; Aubakirov 29'; Naidovsky 43'		Makhmutov 88'; Izrailov 90'

Spartak Manege, Moscow
Attendance: 150
Referee: Nicolai Stuleni (Moldova)

26 January 1993

Alga Bishkek (Kyrgyzstan)	1 – 5	(Lithuania) Ekranas Panevėžys
Šuliauskas 85' (o.g.)		Šlekys 47', 54'; Poderis 62', 77', 86'

Spartak Manege, Moscow
Attendance: 200
Referee: Igor Egorov (Russia)
26 January 1993

Kairat Almaty (Kazakhstan)	0 – 3 (awarded)	Russia U19

CSKA Palace of Sports, Moscow

The match was awarded as 3–0 win for Russia as Kairat refused to play against unofficial participant.

27 January 1993

Ekranas Panevėžys (Lithuania)	0 – 0	(Kazakhstan) Kairat Almaty

Dynamo Manage, Moscow
Attendance: 300
Referee: Viktor Filippov (Russia)
27 January 1993

Alga Bishkek (Kyrgyzstan)	1 – 4	Russia U19
Izrailov 21'		Kharlachev 56'; Chudin 74'; Zazulin 76'; Zernov 90'

Dynamo Manage, Moscow
Attendance: 150
Referee: A.Aslanov (Azerbaijan)

=== Group D ===
Team	Pld	W	D	L	GF	GA	GD	Pts
Belarus Minsk	3	3	0	0	9	2	+7	6
(Estonia) Norma Tallinn	3	1	1	1	8	4	+4	3
(Armenia) Homenetmen Yerevan	3	1	1	1	5	6	−1	3
(Tajikistan) Regar Tursunzoda	3	0	0	3	3	13	−10	0

==== Results ====
25 January 1993

Homenetmen Yerevan (Armenia)	0 – 2	Belarus Minsk
		Shtanyuk 11'; Kachura 82'

CSKA Palace of Sports, Moscow
Attendance: 1,000
Referee: Vladimir Ovchinnikov (Russia)
25 January 1993

Regar Tursunzoda (Tajikistan)	0 – 5	(Estonia) Norma Tallinn
		Borissov 28'; Pushtov 30', 48', 52'; Bragin 61'

Spartak Manege, Moscow
Attendance: 150
Referee: Sergei Anokhin (Russia)

26 January 1993

Belarus Minsk	1 – 0	(Estonia) Norma Tallinn
Shirokiy 67'

CSKA Palace of Sports, Moscow
Attendance: 1,000
Referee: Sardar Nadjafaliev (Uzbekistan)
26 January 1993

Homenetmen Yerevan (Armenia)	2 – 1	(Tajikistan) Regar Tursunzoda
Markarian 42'; A.Avetisyan 76' (pen.)		Tirkia 60'

Spartak Manege, Moscow
Attendance: 100
Referee: Sergiejus Slyva (Lithuania)

27 January 1993

Belarus Minsk	6 – 2	(Tajikistan) Regar Tursunzoda
Kachura 21'; Shirokiy 59', 85'; Shtanyuk 75'; Putilo 78'; Lukin 84'		Gubaydulin 35'; Tolibov 73'

CSKA Palace of Sports, Moscow
Attendance: 100
Referee: Malkhaz Kobiashvili (Georgia)
27 January 1993

Norma Tallinn (Estonia)	3 – 3	(Armenia) Homenetmen Yerevan
Pushtov 1'; Bragin 28'; Tšmil 87'		Markarian 2'; Oganesyan 9'; A.Avetsyan 35'

Spartak Manege, Moscow
Attendance: 100
Referee: Yuri Chebotarev (Russia)

== Final rounds ==
Semi-finals (29 Jan)
(Russia)	Spartak Moscow	2
(Georgia (country))	Dinamo Tbilisi	1
(Lithuania)	Ekranas Panevėžys	0
(Belarus)	Belarus Minsk (p)	0

Final (31 Jan)
(Russia)	Spartak Moscow	8
(Belarus)	Belarus Minsk	0

=== Semi-finals ===
29 January 1993

Spartak Moscow (Russia)	2 – 1	(Georgia (country)) Dinamo Tbilisi
Karpin 53'; Onopko 85'		Shelia 40'

CSKA Palace of Sports, Moscow
Attendance: 5,000
Referee: Vadim Zhuk (Belarus)
29 January 1993

Ekranas Panevėžys (Lithuania)	0 – 0 (a.e.t.)	Belarus Minsk
Penalties
Gražiūnas (penalty missed); Bubliauskas (penalty scored); Mika (penalty scored); Poderis (penalty missed)	2–4	(penalty scored) Putilo; (penalty scored) Shiroky; (penalty scored) Shtanyuk; (penalty scored) Pavlyuchuk

CSKA Palace of Sports, Moscow
Attendance: 1,500
Referee: Sergei Khusainov (Russia)

=== Final ===
31 January 1993

Spartak Moscow (Russia)	8 – 0	Belarus Minsk
Pisarev 10'; Pyatnitsky 27', 56'; Onopko 29', 54'; Beschastnykh 65', 84'; Radchenko 79' (pen.)

CSKA Palace of Sports, Moscow
Attendance: 5,000
Referee: Nikolay Obyedkov (Kazakhstan)

== Top scorers ==
Rank	Player	Team	Goals
1	(Georgia (country)) Shota Arveladze	(Georgia (country)) Dinamo Tbilisi	5
2	(Russia) Valeri Karpin	(Russia) Spartak Moscow	4
2	(Lithuania) Eimantas Poderis	(Lithuania) Ekranas Panevėžys	4
2	(Estonia) Aleksandr Pushtov	(Estonia) Norma Tallinn	4
2	(Uzbekistan) Valery Kechinov	(Uzbekistan) Pakhtakor Tashkent	4

== See also ==
- 1991–92 Soviet Cup
