= 1993 ECO Cup =

Tournament details
- Country: Iran
- Venue(s): Azadi Stadium, Tehran
- Dates: 6 June – 14 June
- Teams: 7

Final positions
- Champions: Iran (3rd title)
- Runners-up: Turkmenistan
- Third place: Tajikistan
- Fourth place: Azerbaijan

Tournament statistics
- Matches played: 12
- Goals scored: 34 (2.83 per match)
- Attendance: 52,000 (4,333 per match)
- Top goal scorer: Samad Marfavi (3 goals)

The ECO Cup 1993 was the last edition of the ECO Cup tournament, held in Tehran, Iran in 1993.

== Participants ==
Out of the 10 members of ECO, three being Afghanistan, Uzbekistan and Turkey were either not invited or for various reasons could not participate.

Teams
Iran
Pakistan A (Note: The Pakistan Football Federation sent an alternate team, designated as "Pakistan A", to the 1993 ECO Cup, while the main national team was participating in the 1994 FIFA World Cup qualifiers. The ECO Cup took place from 6 to 14 June 1993, between two rounds of the group A qualifiers including Pakistan, held from 22–30 May (in Jordan) and 12–20 June (in China). The ECO Cup squad was managed by a completely different coaching staff, and only a few players from that team were later selected for the second phase of the qualifiers in China.)
Azerbaijan
Kazakhstan U21
Kyrgyzstan
Tajikistan
Turkmenistan
Turkey Did not participate

== Venues ==
Tehran is located in Iran	Tehran
Tehran is located in Iran	Azadi Stadium
Tehran is located in Iran	Capacity: 100,000

== Group stage ==
Group 1

Team	Pts	Pld	W	D	L	GF	GA	GD
Iran	4	2	2	0	0	7	1	+6
Turkmenistan	2	2	1	0	1	5	2	+3
Pakistan A	0	2	0	0	2	0	9	−9

6 June 1993

Iran	5–0	Pakistan A
Javad Zarincheh 42'; Hamid Derakhshan 49'; Karim Bagheri 65'; Samad Marfavi 70'; Majid Namjoo-Motlagh 75'	Report

Azadi Stadium, Tehran
Attendance: 15,000
Referee: Hossein Khoshkhan (Iran)

7 June 1993

Turkmenistan	4–0	Pakistan A
Nurmyradow 5', 10'; Çaryýar Muhadow 60', 80'	Report

Azadi Stadium, Tehran

8 June 1993

Iran	2–1	Turkmenistan
Samad Marfavi ?'; Mohsen Garousi ?'	Report	Nurmuradov 82'

Azadi Stadium, Tehran
Attendance: 12,000
Referee: Ahmad Abharan-Alvari (Iran)

Group 2

Team	Pts	Pld	W	D	L	GF	GA	GD
Azerbaijan	5	3	2	1	0	8	5	+3
Tajikistan	3	3	1	1	1	4	3	+1
Kyrgyzstan	2	3	0	2	1	3	4	−1
Kazakhstan U21	2	3	0	2	1	3	6	−3

6 June 1993

Azerbaijan	2–0	Tajikistan
Vidadi Rzayev 55' (pen.); Samir Alakbarov 62'	Report

Azadi Stadium, Tehran
Attendance: 5,000

6 June 1993

Kyrgyzstan	0–0	Kazakhstan U21

Azadi Stadium, Tehran
Attendance: ?

7 June 1993

Azerbaijan	3–2	Kyrgyzstan
Vidadi Rzayev 30'; Ruslan Lukin 43', 63'	Report	Dmitry Kovalenko 40'; Kanatbek Ishenbaev 76'

Azadi Stadium, Tehran
Attendance: 5,000

7 June 1993

Tajikistan	3–0	Kazakhstan U21

Azadi Stadium, Tehran

8 June 1993

Tajikistan	1–1	Kyrgyzstan
Muminov 85'		Kanatbek Ishenbaev 78'

Azadi Stadium, Tehran
Attendance: 3,000

8 June 1993

Azerbaijan	3–3	Kazakhstan U21
Gurban Gurbanov 10', 25'; Müşfiq Hüseynov 37'	Report	Azamat Niyazymbetov 15'; Serik Zheilitbayev 75' (pen.), 86' (pen.)

Azadi Stadium, Tehran
Attendance: 2,000

=== Semi finals ===
13 June 1993

Turkmenistan	w/o	Azerbaijan

Azadi Stadium, Tehran

13 June 1993

Iran	1–0	Tajikistan
Roosta ?'	Report

Azadi Stadium, Tehran
Attendance: 25,000

=== Final ===
14 June 1993

Iran	2–1	Turkmenistan
Roosta ?'; Samad Marfavi ?'	report	Vitali Zolotukhin ?'

Azadi Stadium, Tehran

== Top scorers ==
3 Goals

- (Iran) Samad Marfavi

2 Goals

- (Iran) Ali Asghar Modir Roosta
- (Azerbaijan) Vidadi Rzayev
- (Kyrgyzstan) Kanatbek Ishenbaev
- (Azerbaijan) Gurban Gurbanov
- (Kazakhstan) Serik Zheilitbayev

== Squads ==
=== Iran ===
Head coach: (Iran) Ali Parvin

No.	Pos.	Player	Date of birth (age)	Caps	Goals	Club
1	GK	Ahmad Reza Abedzadeh	25 May 1966 (aged 26)	33	0	(Football Federation Islamic Republic of Iran) Persepolis
2	DF	Javad Zarincheh	23 July 1966 (aged 26)	38	0	(Football Federation Islamic Republic of Iran) Esteghlal
	DF	Sadegh Varmazyar	21 March 1966 (aged 26)	2	0	(Football Federation Islamic Republic of Iran) Esteghlal
	DF	Yahya Golmohammadi	19 March 1971 (aged 21)	0	0	(Football Federation Islamic Republic of Iran) Persepolis
	DF	Nader Mohammadkhani	23 August 1963 (aged 29)			(Football Federation Islamic Republic of Iran) Persepolis
6	MF	Mehdi Fonounizadeh	19 May 1962 (aged 30)	31	0	(Football Federation Islamic Republic of Iran) Esteghlal
8	MF	Hamid Derakhshan (c)	31 December 1957 (aged 35)	28	5	(Football Federation Islamic Republic of Iran) Persepolis
9	FW	Javad Manafi	23 September 1970 (aged 22)	0	0	(Football Federation Islamic Republic of Iran) Persepolis
	FW	Hassan Shirmohammadi	22 May 1968 (aged 24)			(Football Federation Islamic Republic of Iran) Persepolis
10	FW	Ali Daei	21 March 1969 (aged 23)	0	0	(Football Federation Islamic Republic of Iran) Persepolis
	FW	Mohsen Garousi	28 November 1968 (aged 24)	10	3	(Football Federation Islamic Republic of Iran) Pas
?	FW	Samad Marfavi	18 May 1965 (aged 27)	20	7	(Football Federation Islamic Republic of Iran) Esteghlal
?	DF	Afshin Peyrovani	6 February 1970 (aged 22)			(Football Federation Islamic Republic of Iran) Persepolis
?	DF	Karim Bagheri	20 February 1974 (aged 18)	0	0	(Football Federation Islamic Republic of Iran) Persepolis
?	FW	Ali Asghar Modir Roosta	31 December 1966 (aged 26)	4	0	(Football Federation Islamic Republic of Iran) Pas
?	MF	Hamid Estili	4 January 1967 (aged 25)	1	0	(Football Federation Islamic Republic of Iran) Persepolis
?	DF	Mohammad Khakpour	20 February 1969 (aged 23)	2	0	(Football Federation Islamic Republic of Iran) Persepolis
?	DF	Farshad Falahatzadeh	21 March 1967 (aged 25)	1	0	(Football Federation Islamic Republic of Iran) Esteghlal
?	MF	Arash Noamouz	6 June 1967 (aged 25)			(Football Federation Islamic Republic of Iran) Pas
?	MF	Sirous Dinmohammadi	2 July 1970 (aged 22)	0	0	(Football Federation Islamic Republic of Iran) Teraktor Sazi
?	MF	Reza Rezaeimanesh	22 July 1969 (aged 23)	1	0	(Football Federation Islamic Republic of Iran) Pas
?	MF	Ali Akbar Yousefi	12 September 1969 (aged 23)			(Football Federation Islamic Republic of Iran) Pas
?	GK	Behzad Gholampour	23 December 1966 (aged 26)	4	0	(Football Federation Islamic Republic of Iran) Pas
?	MF	Majid Namjoo-Motlagh	13 May 1967 (aged 25)	36	2	(Football Federation Islamic Republic of Iran) Persepolis

=== Turkmenistan ===
Head coach: (Turkmenistan) Bayram Durdiyev

No.	Pos.	Player	Date of birth (age)	Caps	Goals	Club
1	GK	Aleksandr Korobko	16 January 1970 (aged 23)			(Football Federation of Turkmenistan) Kopetdag Asgabat
	GK	Ýewgeniý Naboýçenko	17 May 1970 (aged 23)			(Football Federation of Turkmenistan) Kopetdag Asgabat
	DF	Yuriy Bordolimov	24 January 1970 (aged 23)			(Football Federation of Turkmenistan) Nebitçi FT
	DF	Sergey Kazakov	23 November 1969 (aged 23)			(Football Federation of Turkmenistan) Kopetdag Asgabat
	DF	Dmitri Korzh	29 October 1971 (aged 21)			(Football Federation of Turkmenistan) Kopetdag Asgabat
	DF	Rahim Kurbanmamedov	3 October 1963 (aged 29)			(Football Federation of Turkmenistan) Kopetdag Asgabat
	DF	Andrei Martynov (c)	17 September 1965 (aged 27)			(Football Federation of Turkmenistan) Kopetdag Asgabat
	DF	Charyyarkuli Seydiew	11 August 1962 (aged 30)			(Football Federation of Turkmenistan) Kopetdag Asgabat
	DF	Yevgeniy Sysoev	3 May 1974 (aged 19)			(Football Federation of Turkmenistan) Kopetdag Asgabat
	MF	Kurbangeldi Durdiyev	12 January 1973 (aged 20)			(Football Federation of Turkmenistan) Kopetdag Asgabat
	DF	Kamil Mingazow	21 June 1968 (aged 24)			(Football Federation of Turkmenistan) Kolkhozchi Turkmen-Kala
	MF	Aman Meredow	27 May 1966 (aged 27)			(Football Federation of Turkmenistan) Kopetdag Asgabat
	MF	Dzhumadurdy Meredov	3 October 1966 (aged 26)			(Football Federation of Turkmenistan) Kopetdag Asgabat
	MF	Kurbanmamed Meredov	20 January 1973 (aged 20)			(Football Federation of Turkmenistan) Nebitçi FT
	FW	Charyar Mukhadov	12 November 1969 (aged 23)			(Turkish Football Federation) MKE Ankaragücü
	FW	Amanmurad Meredov	28 January 1972 (aged 21)			(Football Federation of Turkmenistan) Nebitçi FT
	FW	Berdymurad Nurmuradov	28 August 1968 (aged 24)			(Football Federation of Turkmenistan) Kopetdag Asgabat
	FW	Vladimir Kostyuk	28 May 1972 (aged 21)			(Russian Football Union) FC Dynamo Moscow
	FW	Vitaliy Zolotukhin	29 June 1970 (aged 22)			(Football Federation of Turkmenistan) Kopetdag Asgabat

=== Pakistan A ===
Head coach: (Pakistan) Muhammad Latif

No.	Pos.	Player	Date of birth (age)	Caps	Goals	Club
1	GK	Muhammad Aslam Khan	7 June 1976 (aged 16)			(Pakistan Football Federation) PIA
	GK	Muhammad Munir	1964 (aged 29)			(Pakistan Football Federation)
	DF	Muhammad Ghaffar	1966 (aged 27)			(Pakistan Football Federation)
	DF	Mohammad Azhar	5 December 1974 (aged 18)			(Pakistan Football Federation)
	DF	Adeel Sarfraz Butt	30 December 1978 (aged 14)			(Pakistan Football Federation) Wohaib FC
	DF	Iftikhar Ali	2 November 1978 (aged 14)			(Pakistan Football Federation) Wohaib FC
	DF	Khaled Khan	11 December 1970 (aged 22)			(Pakistan Football Federation) Wohaib FC
	MF	Naeem Khalid	24 January 1978 (aged 15)			(Pakistan Football Federation) Wohaib FC
	MF	Zafar Ali	1 September 1976 (aged 16)			(Pakistan Football Federation)
	FW	Amjad Zakariya	15 May 1971 (aged 22)			(Pakistan Football Federation) WAPDA
	FW	Lal Muhammad Lalo (c)				(Pakistan Football Federation)
		Muhammad Ilyas				(Pakistan Football Federation)
		Muhammad Yousaf				(Pakistan Football Federation)
		Muhammad Siddiq				(Pakistan Football Federation)
		Abdul Malik				(Pakistan Football Federation)
		Muhammad Ayub				(Pakistan Football Federation)
		Fawad Ahmed				(Pakistan Football Federation)
		Pervez Samuel				(Pakistan Football Federation)

=== Azerbaijan ===
Head coach: (Azerbaijan) Alakbar Mammadov

No.	Pos.	Player	Date of birth (age)	Caps	Goals	Club
1	GK	Elkhan Hasanov	4 March 1967 (aged 25)	2	0	(Association of Football Federations of Azerbaijan) Neftchi Baku
	GK	Jamaladdin Aliyev	29 January 1960 (aged 32)	0	0	(Association of Football Federations of Azerbaijan) Qarabağ
	DF	Faig Jabbarov	26 June 1972 (aged 20)	1	0	(Association of Football Federations of Azerbaijan) Kapaz
	DF	Elshad Ahmadov	11 September 1970 (aged 22)	1	0	(Association of Football Federations of Azerbaijan) Qarabağ
	DF	Tarlan Ahmadov	17 November 1971 (aged 21)	2	0	(Russian Football Union) Terek Grozny
	DF	Arif Asadov	18 August 1970 (aged 22)	1	0	(Association of Football Federations of Azerbaijan) Neftchi Baku
	DF	Emin Ağayev	10 August 1973 (aged 19)	2	0	(Russian Football Union) Anzhi Makhachkala
	MF	Zaur Qarayev	25 June 1968 (aged 24)	2	0	(Association of Football Federations of Azerbaijan) Qarabağ
	MF	Yashar Vahabzade	8 April 1960 (aged 32)	0	0	(Association of Football Federations of Azerbaijan) Neftchi Baku
	MF	Ceyhun Tanrıverdiyev	21 June 1973 (aged 19)	1	0	(Association of Football Federations of Azerbaijan) Kapaz
	MF	Vidadi Rzayev	4 September 1967 (aged 25)	2	1	(Russian Football Union) Terek Grozny
	MF	Mahmud Qurbanov	10 May 1973 (aged 19)	2	0	(Association of Football Federations of Azerbaijan) Kapaz
	MF	Shahin Diniyev (c)	12 July 1966 (aged 26)	2	0	(Russian Football Union) Terek Grozny
	MF	Məqsəd Yaqubəliyev	5 July 1965 (aged 27)	0	0	(Association of Football Federations of Azerbaijan) Turan Tovuz
	FW	Ruslan Lukin	20 November 1971 (aged 21)	0	0	(Football Federation of Belarus) Dinamo Minsk
	FW	Gurban Gurbanov	13 April 1972 (aged 20)	2	0	(Association of Football Federations of Azerbaijan) Daşqın Zaqatala
	FW	Samir Alakbarov	8 October 1968 (aged 24)	2	0	(Association of Football Federations of Azerbaijan) Neftchi Baku
	FW	Mushfig Huseynov	14 February 1970 (aged 22)	0	0	(Association of Football Federations of Azerbaijan) Qarabağ
		Əyani Beydiyev	21 May 1968 (aged 24)	0	0	(Association of Football Federations of Azerbaijan) Neftchi Baku

=== Tajikistan ===
Head coach: (Tajikistan) Sharif Nazarov

No.	Pos.	Player	Date of birth (age)	Caps	Goals	Club
1	GK	Vladimir Ivanchikhin	1 November 1968 (aged 24)			(Tajikistan Football Federation) Regar-TadAZ Tursunzoda
	GK	Dmitry Suleymanov	30 January 1971 (aged 22)			(Tajikistan Football Federation) Pamir Dushanbe
	DF	Rustam Alifbekov	1 January 1968 (aged 25)			(Tajikistan Football Federation) Pamir Dushanbe
	DF	Igor Cherevchenko	21 August 1974 (aged 18)			(Tajikistan Football Federation) Pamir Dushanbe
	DF	Vyacheslav Knyazev	22 May 1974 (aged 19)			(Tajikistan Football Federation) Pamir Dushanbe
	DF	Shuhrat Mamajonov (c)	16 March 1970 (aged 23)			(Tajikistan Football Federation) Pamir Dushanbe
	DF	Rustam Ubaydulloev	8 September 1971 (aged 21)			(Tajikistan Football Federation) Pamir Dushanbe
	MF	Sergey Artyomov	1971			(Tajikistan Football Federation) Pamir Dushanbe
	MF	Barot Azimov				(Tajikistan Football Federation) Pamir Dushanbe
	MF	Suleyman Bobokalonov	3 January 1960 (aged 33)			(Tajikistan Football Federation) Shodmon Hisor
	MF	Igor Ezhurov	3 September 1965 (aged 27)			(Tajikistan Football Federation) Pakhtakor Proletarsk
	MF	Anvar Gulmamadov	1 January 1971 (aged 22)			(Tajikistan Football Federation) Pamir Dushanbe
	MF	Rustam Kurbanov	12 December 1966 (aged 26)			(Tajikistan Football Federation) Sitora Dushanbe
	MF	Tokhirjon Muminov	20 August 1970 (aged 22)			(Tajikistan Football Federation) Pamir Dushanbe
	FW	Zulfikar Azizov	1 January 1973 (aged 20)			(Tajikistan Football Federation) Pamir Dushanbe
	FW	Orif Bobokhonov	16 June 1963 (aged 29)			(Tajikistan Football Federation) Sitora Dushanbe
	FW	Nadzhimiddin Tolibov	8 March 1964 (aged 29)			(Tajikistan Football Federation) Regar-TadAZ Tursunzoda
	FW	Kholmurod Zardov	21 August 1972 (aged 20)			(Tajikistan Football Federation) Pamir Dushanbe

=== Kyrgyzstan ===
Head coach: (Kyrgyzstan) Meklis Koshaliev

No.	Pos.	Player	Date of birth (age)	Caps	Goals	Club
1	GK	Zakir Dzhalilov	30 July 1972 (aged 20)			(Kyrgyz Football Union) Alga Bishkek
	GK	Aleksey Roschin	14 December 1967 (aged 25)			(Kyrgyz Football Union) Alga Bishkek
	DF	Vasily Kononov	14 August 1971 (aged 21)			(Kyrgyz Football Union) Alga Bishkek
	DF	Rinat Urmeev	7 July 1970 (aged 22)			(Kyrgyz Football Union) Alga RIIF Bishkek
	DF	Vitaly Rogovanov	1 January 1965 (aged 28)			(Kyrgyz Football Union) Dynamo Alai-Osh
	DF	Alik Asanbaev	29 August 1969 (aged 23)			(Kyrgyz Football Union) Alga Bishkek
	MF	Murat Dzhumakeev				(Kyrgyz Football Union) Alga Bishkek
	DF	Arkady Makhmutov	2 August 1961 (aged 31)			(Kyrgyz Football Union) Alga Bishkek
	MF	Tashtanbek Kaynazarov				(Kyrgyz Football Union) Alga Bishkek
	MF	Dmitry Kovalenko	1 January 1972 (aged 21)			(Kyrgyz Football Union) Dynamo Alai-Osh
	FW	Kanatbek Ishenbaev	11 August 1974 (aged 18)			(Kyrgyz Football Union) Alga Bishkek
	MF	Asylbek Momunov (c)	8 March 1966 (aged 26)			(Kyrgyz Football Union) Alga RIIF Bishkek
	FW	Vitaly Kobzar	9 May 1972 (aged 20)			(Kyrgyz Football Union) Alga Bishkek
	FW	Davran Babaev	23 August 1972 (aged 20)			(Kyrgyz Football Union) Dynamo Alai-Osh
	FW	Zamirbek Zhumagulov	17 January 1972 (aged 20)			(Kyrgyz Football Union) Alga Bishkek
	FW	Vasily Ermoshkin	1 January 1973 (aged 20)			(Kyrgyz Football Union) Alga Bishkek

=== Kazakhstan U21 ===
Head coach: (Kazakhstan) Bauyrzhan Baimukhammedov

No.	Pos.	Player	Date of birth (age)	Caps	Goals	Club
	GK	Aleksandr Panov				(Kazakhstan Football Federation)
	DF	Adlet Dzhamangarayev				(Kazakhstan Football Federation)
		Anuar Nisambayev				(Kazakhstan Football Federation)
		Serik Zheilitbayev				(Kazakhstan Football Federation)
		Nurzan Doskeyev				(Kazakhstan Football Federation)
	DF	Sergei Pak	3 October 1973 (aged 19)			(Kazakhstan Football Federation) FC Dinamo Alma-Ata
	DF	Ruslan Gumar	18 November 1973 (aged 19)			(Kazakhstan Football Federation) FC Ekibastuzets
	MF	Alexei Klishin	1 October 1973 (aged 19)			(Kazakhstan Football Federation) Dinamo Alma-Ata
	MF	Sergey Milovanov	1 January 1974 (aged 19)			(Kazakhstan Football Federation) FC Dinamo Alma-Ata
	MF	Azamat Niyazymbetov	25 March 1974 (aged 19)			(Kazakhstan Football Federation) Dinamo Alma-Ata
	MF	Manar Nuftiev	9 March 1972 (aged 21)			(Kazakhstan Football Federation) FC Shakhter-Bulat
	FW	Igor Grokhovskiy	30 June 1973 (aged 19)			(Kazakhstan Football Federation) Dinamo Alma-Ata
	FW	Oleg Litvinenko	22 November 1973 (aged 19)			(Kazakhstan Football Federation) Dinamo Alma-Ata
