= Football at the 1994 Asian Games – Men's tournament =

Men's football at the 1994 Asian Games
- Venue: Regional Park Stadium; Hiroshima Stadium; Bingo Stadium; Miyoshi Athletic Stadium; Hiroshima Big Arch
- Date: 1–16 October
- Nations: 18

Medalists
gold medal	Uzbekistan
silver medal	China
bronze medal	Kuwait

Football was contested as part of the programme for the 1994 Asian Games which was hosted in Hiroshima, Japan from 2 to 16 October 1994. It was the 12th edition of the men's football tournament at the multi-sport event organised by the Olympic Council of Asia.

The men's football tournament began with the first matches of the group stage on 1 October 1994 and ended with the gold medal match on 16 October 1994. Uzbekistan and China contested the final. Goals from Igor Shkvyrin, Sergey Lebedev, Azamat Abduraimov and Shukhrat Maqsudov helped Uzbekistan defeat China 4–2 to win the gold medal. In the bronze medal match, Kuwait defeated South Korea 2–1.

== Background ==
Football had been part of the Asian Games programme following the debut of the men's competition at the inaugural 1951 Asian Games in India.

South Korea held the record for gold medals having won the football tournament three times. However, they had only won the gold medal outright once after twice sharing the title. India, Iran and Taiwan had each won the gold medal outright twice. Iran were the defending champions after defeating North Korea 4–1 on penalties in the final at the 1990 Asian Games in China.

The Asian Football Confederation (AFC) suggested that the competition should be age-restricted to under-23 players but this was ignored by the majority of the competing nations. Only Saudi Arabia fielded an under-23 squad.

== Format ==
Originally, 22 teams were due to take part in the competition. They were drawn into five single round robin groups – two of five teams and three of four teams. However, five teams withdrew before the start of the competition. The remaining 17 plus two additional teams were instead drawn into four single round robin groups – three of five teams and one of four teams. The group winners and runners-up would then contest the quarter-finals. The winners of the quarter-finals would contest the semi-finals which would decide which teams contested the gold and bronze medal matches.

=== Participants ===
- Bahrain
- China
- Hong Kong
- Iran
- Japan
- Kuwait
- Malaysia
- Myanmar
- Nepal
- Oman
- Qatar
- Saudi Arabia
- South Korea
- Thailand
- Turkmenistan
- United Arab Emirates
- Uzbekistan
- Yemen

== Group stage ==
=== Group A ===
China and Turkmenistan advanced to the quarter-finals.

==== Table ====
Pos	Team	Pld	W	D	L	GF	GA	GD	Pts	Qualification
1	China	4	3	1	0	10	4	+6	10	Qualification for the quarter-finals
2	Turkmenistan	4	1	3	0	9	5	+4	6	Qualification for the quarter-finals
3	Iran	4	1	2	1	5	2	+3	5	
4	Bahrain	4	1	2	1	6	5	+1	5	
5	Yemen	4	0	0	4	0	14	−14	0	

==== Matches ====
1 October 1994
14:00

Turkmenistan	2–2	China
Nurmyradow 6'; Seýdiýew 89' (pen.)		Gao Feng 9'; Gao Zhongxun 69' (pen.)

Regional Park Stadium, Hiroshima
1 October 1994
19:00

Yemen	0–2	Bahrain
		Al-Hammadi 55'; Jawhar 72'

Regional Park Stadium, Hiroshima

3 October 1994
16:00

China	4–0	Yemen
Gao Feng 10'; Li Bing 15'; Peng Weiguo 21'; Cao Xiandong 82'

Hiroshima Stadium, Hiroshima
3 October 1994
19:00

Iran	0–0	Bahrain

Hiroshima Stadium, Hiroshima

5 October 1994
16:00

Bahrain	2–3	China
Darwish 33', 65'		Peng Weiguo 2'; Li Xiao 30', 51'

Bingo Stadium, Onomichi
5 October 1994
19:00

Iran	1–1	Turkmenistan
Bagheri 86'		Ç. Muhadow 62'

Bingo Stadium, Onomichi

7 October 1994
19:00

Iran	0–1	China
		Hu Zhijun 76'

Regional Park Stadium, Hiroshima
7 October 1994
19:00

Yemen	0–4	Turkmenistan
		Ç. Muhadow 20', 55', 85'; Seýdiýew 30'

Hiroshima Stadium, Hiroshima

9 October 1994
16:00

Bahrain	2–2	Turkmenistan
Al-Doseri 6'; Al-Marzouqi 21'		Annadurdyýew 54', 89'

Athletic Stadium, Miyoshi
9 October 1994
19:00

Iran	4–0	Yemen
Pious 11'; Shahmohammadi 18'; Moharrami 56'; Manafi 87'

Athletic Stadium, Miyoshi

=== Group B ===
Uzbekistan and Saudi Arabia advanced to the quarter-finals.

==== Table ====
Pos	Team	Pld	W	D	L	GF	GA	GD	Pts	Qualification
1	Uzbekistan	4	4	0	0	15	5	+10	12	Qualification for the quarter-finals
2	Saudi Arabia	4	3	0	1	9	8	+1	9	Qualification for the quarter-finals
3	Malaysia	4	1	1	2	6	11	−5	4	
4	Hong Kong	4	1	0	3	6	8	−2	3	
5	Thailand	4	0	1	3	8	12	−4	1	

==== Matches ====
1 October 1994
16:00

Saudi Arabia	1–4	Uzbekistan
Al-Johani 90'		Lebedev 14'; Qosimov 23'; Shkvyrin 25', 43'

Hiroshima Stadium, Hiroshima
1 October 1994
19:00

Malaysia	4–3	Hong Kong
Azizol 48'; Azman 53'; Thanasegar 80'; Dollah 88'		Bredbury 77', 79', 89' (pen.)

Hiroshima Stadium, Hiroshima

3 October 1994
16:00

Uzbekistan	5–0	Malaysia
Abduraimov 24'; Qosimov 31'; Shkvyrin 44', 78'; Maqsudov 83'

Regional Park Stadium, Hiroshima
3 October 1994
19:00

Thailand	1–2	Hong Kong
Dusit 67'		Lam Hung Lun 50'; Lee Kin Wo 76'

Regional Park Stadium, Hiroshima

5 October 1994
16:00

Hong Kong	0–1	Uzbekistan
		Abduraimov 20'

Athletic Stadium, Miyoshi
5 October 1994
19:00

Thailand	2–4	Saudi Arabia
Dusit 82', 89'		Lutf 9', 37'; Al-Johani 60', 89'

Athletic Stadium, Miyoshi

7 October 1994
16:00

Thailand	4–5	Uzbekistan
Somrit 27', 67'; Suchin 83'; Thawatchai 88'		Qosimov 10', 42'; Maqsudov 27', 61'; Shkvyrin 66'

Bingo Stadium, Hiroshima
7 October 1994
19:00

Malaysia	1–2	Saudi Arabia
Dollah 44'		Lutf 4'; Zubromawi 71' (pen.)

Bingo Stadium, Hiroshima

9 October 1994
16:00

Hong Kong	1–2	Saudi Arabia
Bredbury 28'		Al-Shenaif 75'; Al-Qanat 87'

Regional Park Stadium, Hiroshima
9 October 1994
19:00

Thailand	1–1	Malaysia
Kiatisuk 23'		Azizol 26'

Regional Park Stadium, Hiroshima

=== Group C ===
Kuwait and South Korea advanced to the quarter-finals.

==== Table ====
Pos	Team	Pld	W	D	L	GF	GA	GD	Pts	Qualification
1	Kuwait	3	2	1	0	11	2	+9	7	Qualification for the quarter-finals
2	South Korea	3	2	0	1	13	2	+11	6	Qualification for the quarter-finals
3	Oman	3	1	1	1	4	4	0	4	
4	Nepal	3	0	0	3	0	20	−20	0	

==== Matches ====
1 October 1994
19:00

South Korea	11–0	Nepal
Ha Seok-ju 9', 55'; Hwang Sun-hong 15', 21', 29', 39', 43', 64', 82', 86'; Ko Jeong-woon 35'

Bingo Stadium, Onomichi
1 October 1994
19:00

Kuwait	2–2	Oman
Al-Shammari 76'; Sulaiman 90+3'		Al-Araimi 72'; Abdulnoor 83'

Athletic Stadium, Miyoshi

3 October 1994
19:00

Kuwait	8–0	Nepal
Sulaiman 6', 51', 90+3'; Marwi 19', 23', 25', 42', 89'

Bingo Stadium, Onomichi

5 October 1994
19:00

South Korea	2–1	Oman
Al-Mazrouei 14' (o.g.); Hwang Sun-hong 49'		Abdulnoor 84'

Regional Park Stadium, Hiroshima

7 October 1994
19:00

South Korea	0–1	Kuwait
		Salboukh 73'

Athletic Stadium, Miyoshi

9 October 1994
19:00

Oman	1–0	Nepal

Hiroshima Stadium, Hiroshima

=== Group D ===
Japan and the United Arab Emirates advanced to the quarter-finals.

==== Table ====
Pos	Team	Pld	W	D	L	GF	GA	GD	Pts	Qualification
1	Japan	3	1	2	0	7	2	+5	5	Qualification for the quarter-finals
2	United Arab Emirates	3	1	2	0	5	3	+2	5	Qualification for the quarter-finals
3	Qatar	3	0	3	0	5	5	0	3	
4	Myanmar	3	0	1	2	2	9	−7	1	

==== Matches ====
3 October 1994
16:00

Qatar	2–2	Myanmar
Salem 44' (pen.); Soufi 57'		Win Aung 81': Tin Myint Aung 83'

Athletic Stadium, Miyoshi
3 October 1994
19:00

Japan	1–1	United Arab Emirates
Miura 67' (pen.)		Al-Talyani 3'

Athletic Stadium, Miyoshi

5 October 1994
16:00

Myanmar	0–2	United Arab Emirates
		Al-Talyani 43', 58'

Hiroshima Stadium, Hiroshima
5 October 1994
19:00

Japan	1–1	Qatar
Takagi 56'		Khamis 21'

Hiroshima Stadium, Hiroshima

9 October 1994
16:00

United Arab Emirates	2–2	Qatar
Khamees 26'; Al-Talyani 78'		Salem 40' (pen.); Soufi 70'

Bingo Stadium, Onomichi
9 October 1994
19:00

Japan	5–0	Myanmar
Hashiratani 37'; Takagi 53'; Iwamoto 82'; Kitazawa 87'; Sawanobori 89'

Bingo Stadium, Onomichi

== Knockout stage ==
=== Quarter-finals ===
China, Uzbekistan and South Korea advanced to the semi-finals in 90 minutes while Wael Sulaiman scored the golden goal in extra time as Kuwait defeated the United Arab Emirates.

11 October 1994
19:00

China	2–0	Saudi Arabia
Cao Xiandong 77'; Li Xiao 88'

Bingo Stadium, Onomichi

11 October 1994
19:00

Kuwait	2–1 (a.e.t./g.g.)	United Arab Emirates
Jarallah 51'; Sulaiman 95'		Al-Talyani 90'

Regional Park Stadium, Hiroshima

11 October 1994
19:00

Uzbekistan	3–0	Turkmenistan
Shkvyrin 14', 33'; Abduraimov 20' (pen.)

Athletic Stadium, Miyoshi

11 October 1994
19:00

Japan	2–3	South Korea
Miura 31'; Ihara 86'		Yoo Sang-chul 52'; Hwang Sun-hong 78', 90' (pen.)

Hiroshima Stadium, Hiroshima

=== Semi-finals ===
China defeated Kuwait and Uzbekistan defeated South Korea to advance to the gold medal match.

13 October 1994
16:00

China	2–0	Kuwait
Li Bing 15'; Peng Weiguo 84'

Regional Park Stadium, Hiroshima

13 October 1994
19:00

Uzbekistan	1–0	South Korea
Abduraimov 65'

Regional Park Stadium, Hiroshima

== Bronze medal match ==
Kuwait came from behind to defeat South Korea 2–1 and win the bronze medal.

15 October 1994
19:00

Kuwait	2–1	South Korea
Sulaiman 8'; Al-Ahmad 20'		Seo Jung-won 5'

Regional Park Stadium, Hiroshima

== Gold medal match ==
Uzbekistan defeated China 4–2 to win the gold medal.

16 October 1994
14:00

China	2–4	Uzbekistan
Hu Zhijun 18'; Li Bing 50'		Skhvyrin 2'; Lebedev 9'; Abduraimov 47' (pen.); Maqsudov 82'

Big Arch, Hiroshima
Referee: Masayoshi Okada (Japan)

== Final standing ==
Rank	Team	Pld	W	D	L	GF	GA	GD	Pts
1st place, gold medalist(s)	Uzbekistan	7	7	0	0	23	7	+16	21
2nd place, silver medalist(s)	China	7	5	1	1	16	8	+8	16
3rd place, bronze medalist(s)	Kuwait	6	4	1	1	15	6	+9	13
4	South Korea	6	3	0	3	17	7	+10	9
5	Saudi Arabia	5	3	0	2	9	10	−1	9
6	Turkmenistan	5	1	3	1	9	8	+1	6
7	Japan	4	1	2	1	9	5	+4	5
8	United Arab Emirates	4	1	2	1	6	5	+1	5
9	Iran	4	1	2	1	5	2	+3	5
10	Bahrain	4	1	2	1	6	5	+1	5
11	Oman	3	1	1	1	4	4	0	4
12	Malaysia	4	1	1	2	6	11	−5	4
13	Qatar	3	0	3	0	5	5	0	3
14	Hong Kong	4	1	0	3	6	8	−2	3
15	Thailand	4	0	1	3	8	12	−4	1
16	Myanmar	3	0	1	2	2	9	−7	1
17	Yemen	4	0	0	4	0	14	−14	0
18	Nepal	3	0	0	3	0	20	−20	0
