= List of Neftçi PFK records and statistics =

This article lists the records of Neftçi PFK.

== UEFA competitions ==
- First UEFA club competitions: UEFA Cup Winners' Cup.
- First match UEFA club competitions: Neftchi Baku 0–3 APOEL, UEFA Cup Winners' Cup, first qualification round, 10 August 1995.
- First goal scored in the UEFA club competitions: Vidadi Rzayev, against PFC Lokomotiv Sofia, UEFA Cup, first qualification round, 17 July 1996.
- First win in the UEFA club competitions: Neftchi Baku 2–1 PFC Lokomotiv Sofia, UEFA Cup, first qualification round, 17 July 1996.
- First group match in the UEFA club competitions: Neftchi Baku 0–0 Partizan, UEFA Europa League, 20 September 2012.
- Biggest win in the UEFA club competitions: Neftchi Baku 3–0 FC Zestaponi, UEFA Champions League, second qualification round, 17 July 2012.
- Biggest defeat in the UEFA club competitions: Neftchi Baku 0–8 Widzew Łódź, in the UEFA Champions League, first qualification round, 23 July 1997.
- Seasons first date UEFA club competitions: 21 June (2008–09).
- Seasons last date UEFA club competitions: 6 December (2012–13).
- Most appearances in UEFA club competitions: 24 appearances
  - (Azerbaijan) Rashad Sadiqov.

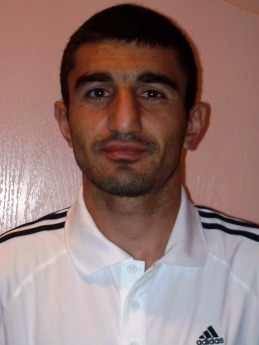
Most appearances (24) in UEFA club competitions: Rashad Sadiqov

- Top scorers in UEFA club competitions: 4 goals
  - (Azerbaijan) Rashad Sadiqov;
  - (Sierra Leone) Julius Wobay.

== Non-UEFA competitions ==
- First Non-UEFA club competitions: CIS Cup
- First match Non-UEFA club competitions: Neftchi Baku 0–1 Skonto Riga, CIS Cup, group stage, 25 January 1993.
- First win in the Non-UEFA club competitions: Neftchi Baku 1–0 Sitora Dushanbe, CIS Cup, group stage, 31 January 1995.
- Biggest win in the UEFA club competitions: Neftchi Baku 4–1 Nebitçi Balkanabat, CIS Cup, group stage, 16 January 2005.
- Biggest defeat in the UEFA club competitions: Neftchi Baku 0–8 Spartak Moscow, in the CIS Cup, group stage, 27 January 1993.
