= Li Xiao (footballer) =

Chinese footballer

Li Xiao 李晓
Personal information
- Date of birth: 17 July 1967 (age 59)
- Place of birth: Shanghai, China
- Height: 1.77 m (5 ft 9 1/2 in)
- Position: Forward

Senior career*
Years	Team	Apps	(Gls)
1988–1995	Shanghai Shenhua		
1995–1997	Shanghai Pudong		
1998–1999	Wuhan Hongjinlong		
2000–2002	Shanghai COSCO		

International career
1992–1994	China	13	(4)

Managerial career
- 2004–2005: Nanchang Bayi Hengyuan
- 2006–2008: Nanchang Bayi Hengyuan
- 2011: Hubei Wuhan Zhongbo
- 2013–2014: Jiangxi Liansheng
- 2015–2016: Hainan Seamen
- 2017: Zhenjiang Huasa
Medal record
Men's football
Representing China
AFC Asian Cup
Bronze medal – third place	1992 Japan	Team
Asian Games
Silver medal – second place	1994 Hiroshima	Football
- * Club domestic league appearances and goals

Li Xiao is a Chinese football forward who played for China in the 1992 Asian Cup. He also played for Shanghai.

== Career statistics ==
=== International ===
Year	Competition	Apps	Goal
1992	Asian Cup	5	1
1992	Friendly	3	0
1994	Asian Games	5	3
Total		13	4

Appearances and goals by national team and year
National team	Year	Apps	Goals
China	1992	6	1
China	1993	2	0
China	1994	5	3
Total		13	4

Scores and results list China's goal tally first, score column indicates score after each Li goal.

List of international goals scored by Li Xiao
No.	Date	Venue	Opponent	Score	Result	Competition
1	6 November 1992	Hiroshima Stadium, Hiroshima, Japan	Japan	2–2	2–3	1992 AFC Asian Cup
2	5 October 1994	Bingo Stadium, Onomichi, Japan	Bahrain	2–0	3–2	1994 Asian Games
3	5 October 1994	Bingo Stadium, Onomichi, Japan	Bahrain	3–1	3–2	1994 Asian Games
4	11 October 1994	Bingo Stadium, Onomichi, Japan	Saudi Arabia	2–0	2–0	1994 Asian Games
