= Vitaly Kafanov =

Kazakhstani-Turkmenistani footballer and coach (born 1960)

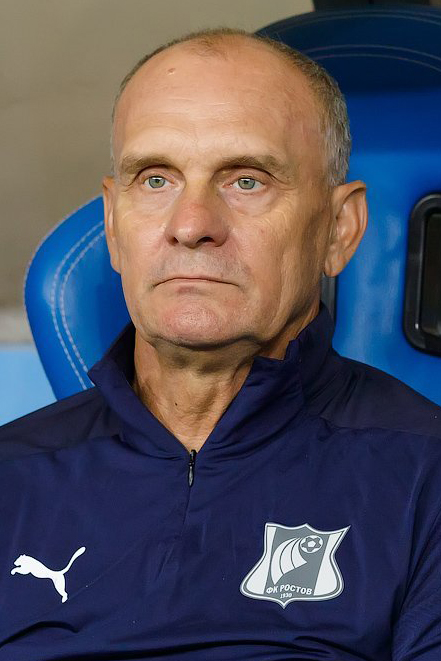
- Kafanov with Rostov in 2021

Personal information
- Full name: Vitaly Vitalyevich Kafanov
- Date of birth: 24 May 1960 (age 66)
- Place of birth: Ashgabat, Turkmen SSR, Soviet Union (now Turkmenistan)
- Height: 1.80 m (5 ft 11 in)
- Position: Goalkeeper

Team information
- Current team: Russia (GK coach); CSKA Moscow (assistant coach)

Senior career*
Years	Team	Apps	(Gls)
1980–1986	Kolkozchi Ashkhabad	138	(1)
1987–1988	Sokol Saratov	21	(0)
1989–1990	Kopet-Dag Ashkhabad	77	(0)
1991	Uralmash Yekaterinburg	15	(0)
1992–1993	Kairat	74	(0)
1994–1995	Yelimay Semey	49	(0)
1996	Nisa Aşgabat		
Total		374	(0)

International career
1992	Kazakhstan	6	(0)
1996	Turkmenistan	2	(0)

Managerial career
- 2001: Kristall Smolensk (assistant)
- 2001: Kristall Smolensk
- 2003–2013: Rubin Kazan (head assistant)
- 2014–2015: Kazakhstan (goalkeeping coach)
- 2015–2017: Rostov (goalkeeping coach)
- 2017–2018: Rubin Kazan (goalkeeping coach)
- 2019–2021: Rostov (assistant)
- 2021–: Russia (goalkeeping coach)
- 2021–2022: Rostov
- 2022–2025: Rostov (assistant)
- 2026–: CSKA Moscow (assistant)
- * Club domestic league appearances and goals

Vitaly Vitalyevich Kafanov (Russian: Виталий Витальевич Кафанов; Turkmen: Witaliý Witalýewiç Kafanow; born 24 May 1960) is a Kazakh-Turkmen football coach and a former player. He is the goalkeepers' coach with Russia national football team and assistant coach with CSKA Moscow.

== Club career ==
He started his youth career in Turkmen SSR, nowadays Turkmenistan.

He began his professional career with Kolkozchi Ashkhabad. He made his senior football debut in 1982 for this club.

In the USSR championship, he also played for the Sokol Saratov, before spending one season with Uralmash Yekaterinburg in the Soviet First League.

Kafanov has extensive experience in the championship of Kazakhstan for FC Kairat and FC Elimay. He is a three-time champion of Kazakhstan (1992, 1994, 1995) and a two-time winner of the Kazakhstan Cup (1992 and 1995).

He retired at the Nisa Aşgabat in 1998.

== Coach career ==
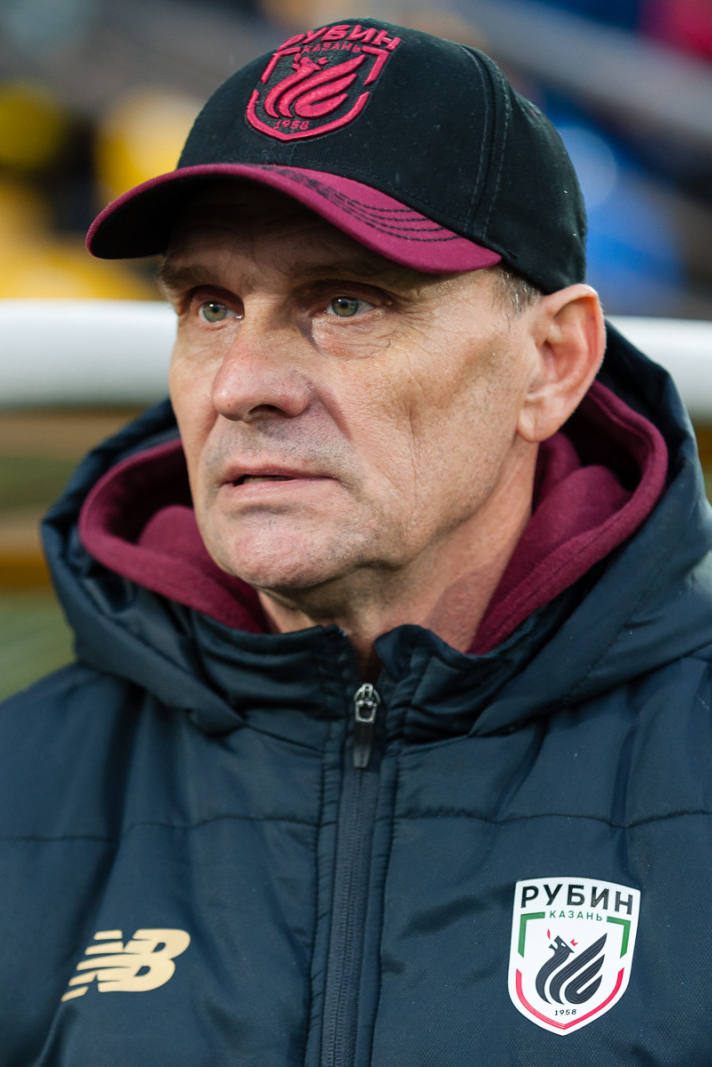
Kafanov with Rubin Kazan

Russian media consider Kafanov to be one of the country's strongest in free kicks.

Following his playing career, Kafanov became a manager, most recently with FC Rubin Kazan.

At the beginning of his career in Russia in 2001, Kafanov headed Kristall Smolensk, which finished the season in 10th place out of 18.

He worked at Rubin Kazan from 2003 with a break of 3.5 years in 2014–2017. Together with the team, he became twice the champion of Russia, won two Russian Super Cups, one Russian Cup.

In 2014–2015, he was helped to Yuri Krasnozhan in the national team of Kazakhstan.

In 2019, he entered into an agreement with the FC Rostov football club, in which he previously worked from 2015 to 2017.

In July 2021, the Russian Football Union named Kafanov as the goalkeeper coach of the Russia national football team.

On 26 October 2021, FC Rostov announced new appointment of Kafanov as a manager of the team. In June 2025 Kafanov announced that he would not be renewing his contract, and would be leaving the club.

== International career ==
Vitaly Kafanov played for two countries. He has three citizenships: Russia, Turkmenistan and Kazakhstan.

Kafanov made six appearances for the Kazakhstan national football team in 1992.

Kafanov concluded his playing career in Nisa Ashgabat. Initially aiming to transition into coaching, he was given an unexpected opportunity to represent the Turkmenistan national team. He featured in friendly matches against Kuwait and later appeared twice official games against Lebanon during the 1996 AFC Asian Cup qualification, showcasing his talent on the international stage.

== Honours ==
=== Club ===
Kairat

- Kazakhstan Premier League: 1992, 1994, 1995

=== Managerial honours ===
Rubin

- Russian Premier League: 2008, 2009
- Russian Cup: 2011–12
- Russian Super Cup: 2010, 2012

Rostov

- Russian Premier League runner-up: 2015–16
