= Friendship Tournament =

- Organising body: United Arab Emirates Football Association
- Founded: 1986
- Abolished: 2001
- Region: United Arab Emirates
- Last champions: Morocco (1st title)
- Most successful team(s): United Arab Emirates (3 titles)

The UAE Four Nations Friendship Tournament, or simply Friendship Tournament (Arabic: بطولة الصداقة), was an international football tournament held in the United Arab Emirates between four teams from 1986 to 2001. The United Arab Emirates have won the most editions, with three titles.

== Results ==
Ed.	Year	Champions	Runners-up	Third place	Fourth place	Num. teams
1	1986	Egypt B	Bulgaria U-21	Sudan	United Arab Emirates B	4
2	1994	Egypt	Morocco	Slovakia	United Arab Emirates	4
3	1996	United Arab Emirates	Morocco	South Korea	Egypt	4
4	1998	United Arab Emirates	Syria	Lebanon	Sudan	4
5	1999	Iraq	United Arab Emirates	Estonia	Turkmenistan	4
6	2000	United Arab Emirates	South Korea	Australia	Kuwait	4
7	2001	Morocco	South Korea	United Arab Emirates	Denmark	4
