= 1986 Friendship Tournament =

Football tournament

Tournament details
- Host country: United Arab Emirates
- City: Dubai
- Dates: 25-29 December 1986
- Teams: 4 (from 2 confederations)
- Venue(s): 1 (in 1 host city)

Final positions
- Champions: Egypt
- Runners-up: Bulgaria
- Third place: Sudan
- Fourth place: United Arab Emirates

Tournament statistics
- Matches played: 6
- Goals scored: 19 (3.17 per match)

The 1986 Friendship Tournament was the 1st edition of the Friendship Tournament and was held from 25 to 29 December 1986 in Dubai, United Arab Emirates. 4 teams participated: the United Arab Emirates B team, Egypt B team, Bulgaria U-21 and Sudan. The Egypt B team won the tournament.

== Participants ==
- United Arab Emirates B team (hosts)
- Egypt B team (Note: The Egyptian B team was referred to as Egypt U-23 team, although it included older players.) (winners)
- Bulgaria U-21 team
- Sudan

== Standings ==
- X = Position
- W = Wins
- D = Draws
- L = Loses
- GF = Favor goals
- GA = Own goals
- GD = Goal difference

X	Team	W	D	L	GF	GA	GD	Points
1	Egypt B team	2	1	0	7	3	+4	5
2	Bulgaria U-21 team	2	0	1	5	3	+2	4
3	Sudan	1	0	2	5	7	-2	2
4	United Arab Emirates B team	0	1	2	2	6	-4	1

Source: RSSSF

== Matches ==
=== Round 1 ===
25 December 1986

Egypt B team	1–0	Bulgaria U-21
Mohammed El-Said 20/30'

25 December 1986

United Arab Emirates B team	0–2	Sudan
		Walid Taushin ?', ?'

=== Round 2 ===
27 December 1986

Bulgaria U-21	3–2	Sudan
Hristo Stoichkov 20', 42' (pen.), 57'		Hamad El-Ghani 50'; Walid Taushin 60' (pen.)

27 December 1986

United Arab Emirates B team	2–2	Egypt B team
Abdulrahman Mohammed ?' ? ?'		? 43' ? ?'

=== Round 3 ===
25 December 1986

United Arab Emirates B team	0–2	Bulgaria U-21
		Lyuboslav Penev ?'; Ivaylo Kirov ?'

25 December 1986

Egypt B team	4–1	Sudan
Hamada El-Masri 1', 52', 70'; Magdi Tolba 80'		Qolla 43'

== Winner ==
1986 Friendship Tournament

Egypt B team
First title

== Statistics ==
=== Goalscorers ===
There were 19 goals scored in 6 matches, for an average of ~3.17 goals scored per match.

N	Team	Player	Goals
1	Sudan	Walid Taushin	3
1	Bulgaria U-21	Hristo Stoichkov	3
1	Egypt B team	Hamada El-Masri	3
2	Egypt B team	Mohammed El-Said	1
2	Sudan	Hamad El-Ghani	1
2	United Arab Emirates B team	Abdulrahman Mohammed	1
2	Bulgaria U-21	Lyuboslav Penev	1
2	Bulgaria U-21	Ivaylo Kirov	1
2	Sudan	Qolla	1
2	Egypt B team	Magdi Tolba	1
