= 2000 Friendship Tournament =

2000 Friendship Tournament/LG Cup, United Arab Emirates
Tournament details
- Host country: United Arab Emirates
- City: Dubai
- Dates: 4–7 October
- Teams: 4
- Venue(s): Al Maktoum Stadium (in 1 host city)

Final positions
- Champions: United Arab Emirates (3rd title)
- Runners-up: South Korea
- Third place: Australia
- Fourth place: Kuwait

Tournament statistics
- Matches played: 4
- Goals scored: 10 (2.5 per match)
- Top scorer(s): (Australia) - Paul Agostino (2 goals)

The 2000 Friendship Tournament was the sixth edition of the 4 nation friendly tournament that took place in October 2001. The tournament was hosted by the United Arab Emirates Football Association. It was also a part of the LG Cup series, despite an edition of that tournament having already been held by Iran earlier that year. Despite their being 4 teams invited, each nation only played twice. The United Arab Emirates finished as title holders, for the third time.

== Participants ==
- United Arab Emirates (hosts)
- Australia
- South Korea
- Kuwait

== Venue ==
| Dubai is located in United Arab Emirates | Dubai |
|---|---|
| Dubai is located in United Arab Emirates | Al Maktoum Stadium |
| Dubai is located in United Arab Emirates | Capacity: 15,000 |

== Results ==
4 October 2000

| United Arab Emirates | 1–1 (3–2 pen) | South Korea |
|---|---|---|
| Salem 34' | Report | Young-Pyo 89' |

Al Maktoum Stadium, Dubai
4 October 2000

| Australia | 1–0 | Kuwait |
|---|---|---|
| Aloisi 40' | Report |

Al Maktoum Stadium, Dubai
7 October 2000

| South Korea | 4–2 | Australia |
|---|---|---|
| Jae-won 42'; Jung-yoon 49'; Ki-Hyeon 65'; Dong-gook 90' (pen.) | Report | Paul Agostino 36', 39' |

Al Maktoum Stadium, Dubai
7 October 2000

| United Arab Emirates | 1–0 | Kuwait |
|---|---|---|
| Ali 88' | Report |

Al Maktoum Stadium, Dubai

== Winner ==
2000 Friendship Tournament

United Arab Emirates
Third title

== Statistics ==
=== Goalscorers ===
There were 10 goals scored in 4 matches, for an average of 2.5 goals per match.

2 goals

- (Australia) Paul Agostino

1 goal

- (Australia) John Aloisi
- (South Korea) Lee Young-pyo
- (South Korea) Sim Jae-won
- (South Korea) Noh Jung-yoon
- (South Korea) Seol Ki-hyeon
- (South Korea) Lee Dong-gook
- (United Arab Emirates) Yasser Salem
- (United Arab Emirates) Kazim Ali
