= Oleg Putilo =

Belarusian footballer (born 1974)

Personal information
- Date of birth: 23 May 1974 (age 52)
- Place of birth: Minsk, Belarusian SSR
- Height: 1.81 m (5 ft 11 in)
- Position: Striker

Senior career*
Years	Team	Apps	(Gls)
1992–1993	Belarus Minsk	30	(12)
1993–1995	Dinamo Minsk	42	(12)
1995–1998	NEC Nijmegen	60	(6)
1998–1999	Royal Cappellen	26	(3)
1999–2001	Fortuna Düsseldorf	68	(23)
2001–2002	VfL Osnabrück	25	(2)
2002–2005	1. FC Kleve	28	(1)
2006–2010	De Treffers		

International career
1992–1995	Belarus U21	12	(3)
- * Club domestic league appearances and goals

Oleg Putilo (Russian: Олег Путило; Belarusian: Алег Пуціла; born 23 May 1974) is a Belarusian former footballer who played as a striker.

== Early life ==
Putilo was born in 1974 in Minsk. He was childhood friends with Belarusian footballer Pavel Mikhalevich.

== Career ==
Putilo started his career with Belarusian side Belarus Minsk. In 1993, he signed for Belarusian side FC Dinamo Minsk. In 1995, he signed for Dutch side NEC Nijmegen. In 1998, he signed for Belgian side Royal Cappellen FC. In 1999, he signed for German side Fortuna Düsseldorf. In 2001, he signed for German side VfL Osnabrück. In 2002, he signed for German side 1. FC Kleve. In 2006, he signed for Dutch side De Treffers.

=== Honours ===
Dinamo Minsk

- Belarusian Premier League: 1993–94, 1994–95, 1995
- Belarusian Cup: 1993–94

=== Style of play ===
Putilo mainly operated as a striker. He was described as a "battering ram striker".

== Personal life ==
After retiring from professional football, Putilo worked as a football manager. He has been married to a Dutch woman.
