= Paul Agostino =

Australian footballer (born 1975)

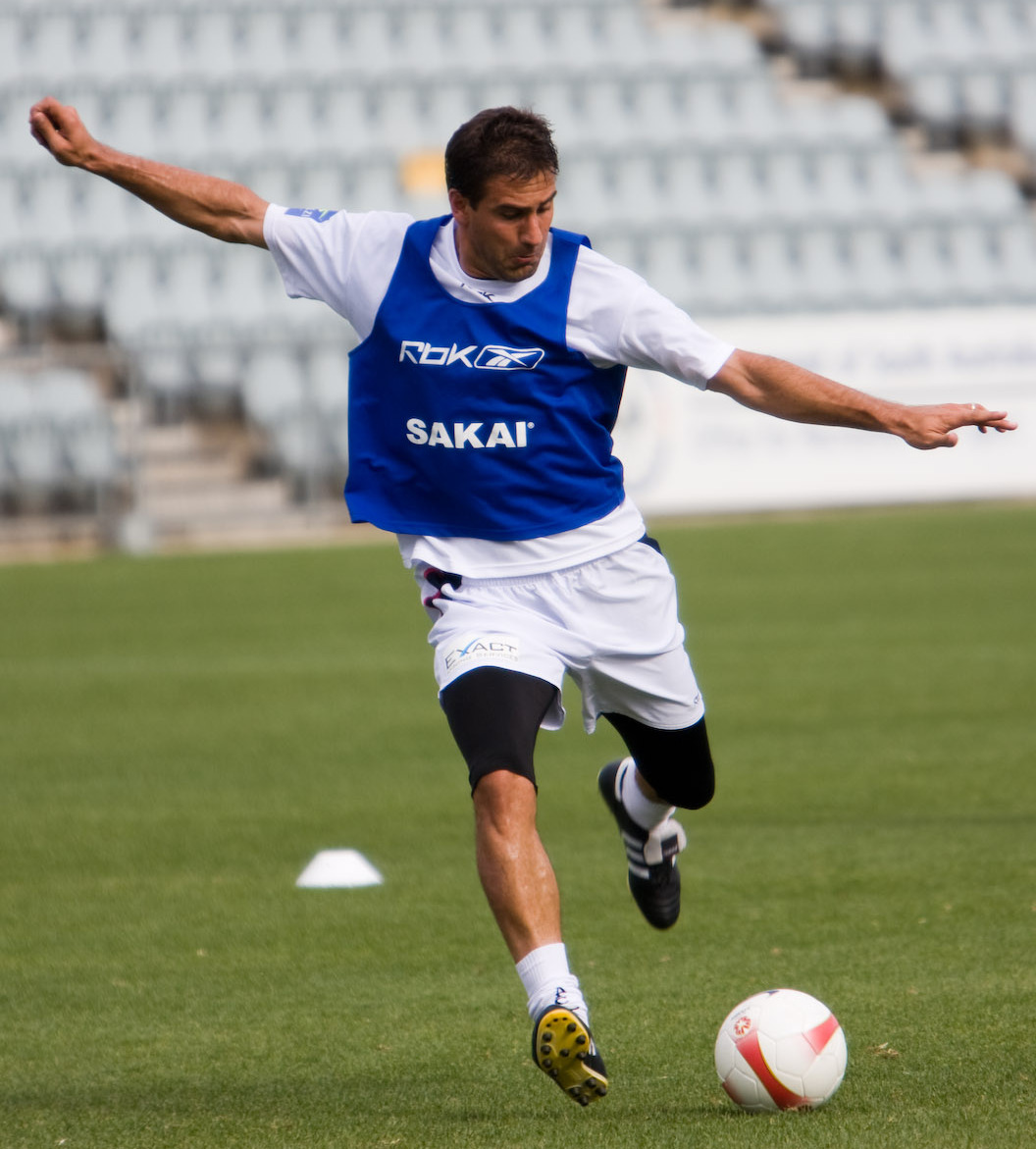

Personal information
- Full name: Paul Agostino
- Date of birth: 9 June 1975 (age 51)
- Place of birth: Adelaide, Australia
- Height: 1.84 m (6 ft 0 in)
- Position: Forward

Youth career
- Salisbury United

Senior career*
Years	Team	Apps	(Gls)
1990	Salisbury United		
1991	West Adelaide	17	(6)
1992–1994	Young Boys	29	(3)
1994–1995	Yverdon-Sport	9	(3)
1995–1997	Bristol City	85	(19)
1997–2007	1860 Munich	248	(77)
2006	1860 Munich II	4	(1)
2007–2009	Adelaide United	20	(4)
Total		412	(113)

International career
1991	Australia U-17	4	(4)
1993	Australia U-20	6	(2)
1996	Australia U-23	3	(1)
1996–2005	Australia	18	(7)
Medal record
Men's association football
Representing Australia
OFC Nations Cup
Winner	2000 Tahiti
- * Club domestic league appearances and goals

Paul Agostino (born 9 June 1975) is an Australian former professional footballer who played as a forward. He played the majority of his club football outside Australia, most notably with 1860 Munich in Germany for ten years. He played 18 times for Australia, winning the OFC Nations Cup of the year 2000.

Agostino attended Findon High School in his hometown of Adelaide. In 2011, he returned to Munich, where his wife Monika was born, with a view to settle there permanently. There he has since partnered with his former 1860 teammate Roman Týce and opened a soccer school called MunichSoccerCamp.

== Club career ==
Born in Adelaide, Australia, Agostino started his club career at Salisbury United. He on to the national scene in 1991 in his first season at senior level with West Adelaide SC in the NSL. It was at this time that "Aga" was picked in the Australian World Youth Championships squad – a squad which contained the likes of Paul Okon and Mark Bosnich during one of Australia's 'Golden Generations' – which made the semi-finals of that competition.

=== Overseas ===
Agostino left for Europe in 1992 and headed for Switzerland, where he signed with Young Boys. Agostino stayed in Bern for two seasons which was invaluable in enabling him to adapt to European life and football. It was in Switzerland that he learnt to speak German which would later help his move to Germany in 1997. He then had a short stint with Yverdon before making the move to England. Agostino signed with Bristol City in 1995 and it was in his second season with Bristol City that he began to score more regularly, bagging 16 goals in the Second Division (the third tier of English club football).

After two productive seasons in Bristol, Agostino's growing reputation caught the eye of Bundesliga side 1860 Munich. He was signed by the club in 1997 at the age of 22. Agostino stayed with the Munich club for a full decade, enduring spells both in and out of the side. Agostino played at the highest level while in Munich, representing 1860 in both the Champions League and the UEFA Cup. He enjoyed his best form for 1860 in the 2000–01 season, scoring 12 goals for the light blues, while Agostino regularly featured in the first team from 1999 to 2002. He fell down the pecking order at 1860 after this and typically played only a handful of games each season until it was revealed that he would be leaving the club on amicable terms at the end of the 2006–07 2. Bundesliga season.

=== Adelaide United ===
It was announced in February 2007 that A-League team Adelaide United had agreed on a two-year contract with Agostino which saw him return to his home city for the first time in 15 years. It was announced on 30 December 2008 that Agostino would retire at the end of the 2008–09 season.

== International career ==
Agostino debuted for the Australia national team in 1996 in a match against Chile. In 1996, he was part of the Australia squad for the Olympics in Atlanta, but he was not used in Australia's three matches there. In 1999, he played twice against the Brazil "B" team, scoring two goals. In 2001, Agostino earned the penalty resulting in Australia’s goal in the 1–0 home victory over Uruguay in World Cup playoff which, in the end, turned out to be unsuccessful. In 2005, he played versus South Africa for the 18th and last time for the Socceroos. In his 18 full international matches he scored seven goals.

== Career statistics ==
=== Club ===
Appearances and goals by club, season and competition
Club	Season	League (Note: Appearances in A-League final series)			Cup		International (Note: Appearances in Club World Cup, UEFA Cup, UEFA Intertoto Cup, Asian Champions League (included in season commencing after group stages))		Total		Ref.
Club	Season	Division	Apps	Goals	Apps	Goals	Apps	Goals	Apps	Goals	Ref.
West Adelaide	1991–92	National Soccer League	17	6	?	?	0	0	17	6	
Young Boys	1992–93	Nationalliga A	12	2	?	?	?	?	12	2	
Young Boys	1993–94	Nationalliga A	14	1	?	?	?	?	14	1	
Young Boys	1994–95	Nationalliga A	3	0	?	?	0	0	3	0	
Young Boys	Total		29	3					29	3	–
Yverdon Sport	1994–95	Nationalliga A	9	3	?	?	0	0	9	3	
Bristol City	1995–96	Football League Second Division	40	10			–		40	10	
Bristol City	1996–97	Football League Second Division	45	9	7	6	–		52	15	
Bristol City	Total		85	19	7	6	0	0	92	25	–
1860 Munich	1997–98	Bundesliga	16	4	2	0	1	0	19	4	
1860 Munich	1998–99	Bundesliga	7	0	0	0	0	0	7	0	
1860 Munich	1999–00	Bundesliga	18	4	2	0	0	0	20	4	
1860 Munich	2000–01	Bundesliga	27	12	3	3	8	2	38	17	
1860 Munich	2001–02	Bundesliga	19	5	1	0	2	1	22	6	
1860 Munich	2002–03	Bundesliga	12	0	0	0	2	0	14	0	
1860 Munich	2003–04	Bundesliga	22	5	2	0	0	0	24	5	
1860 Munich	2004–05	2. Bundesliga	31	7	2	1	0	0	33	8	
1860 Munich	2005–06	2. Bundesliga	31	9	3	2	0	0	34	11	
1860 Munich	2006–07	2. Bundesliga	19	7	1	0	0	0	20	7	
1860 Munich	Total		202	53	16	6	13	3	231	62	–
1860 Munich II	2006–07	Regionalliga Süd	4	1	–		–		4	1	
Adelaide United	2007–08	A-League	10	4	0	0	0	0	10	4	
Adelaide United	2008–09	A-League	10	0	1	0	3	0	14	0	
Adelaide United	Total		20	4	1	0	3	0	24	4	–
Career total			366	89	24	12	16	3	406	104	–

=== International ===
Appearances and goals by national team and year
National team	Year	Apps	Goals
Australia	1996	2	0
Australia	2000	12	5
Australia	2001	2	0
Australia	2004	1	1
Australia	2005	1	0
Total		18	6

Scores and results list Australia's goal tally first, score column indicates score after each Agostino goal.

List of international goals scored by Paul Agostino
No.	Date	Venue	Opponent	Score	Result	Competition
1	15 February 2000	Estadio Playa Ancha, Valparaíso, Chile	Bulgaria	1–0	1–1	Friendly
2	29 June 2000	Papeete, Tahiti	Cook Islands	1–0	17–0	OFC Nations Cup 2000
3	29 June 2000	Papeete, Tahiti	Cook Islands	12–0	17–0	OFC Nations Cup 2000
4	7 October 2000	Dubai, United Arab Emirates	South Korea	1–0	2–4	2000 Friendship Tournament
5	7 October 2000	Dubai, United Arab Emirates	South Korea	2–0	2–4	2000 Friendship Tournament
6	18 February 2004	Estadio Olímpico, Caracas, Venezuela	Venezuela	1–0	1–1	Friendly

== Honours ==
Australia

- OFC Nations Cup: 2000
