= Khaled Khan (footballer) =

Pakistani football & Dodgeball player (born 1970)

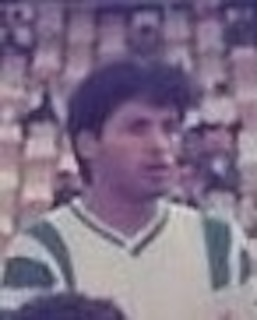
- Khan with Pakistan A during the 1993 ECO Cup

Personal information
- Full name: Khaled Amir Ahmed Khan
- Place of birth: Sialkot, Pakistan
- Height: 5 ft 10 in (1.78 m)
- Positions: Right back; right winger

Senior career*
Years	Team	Apps	(Gls)
- Punjab
1992–1995	Wohaib		
1993	→ Defence FC (loan)		

International career
1992	Pakistan	3	(0)
- * Club domestic league appearances and goals

Khaled Amir Ahmed Khan is a Pakistani former footballer who played as a right back and right winger. Khan represented Wohaib at the 1992–93 Asian Club Championship, and played for the Pakistan national team in 1992. He also represented and captained the Pakistan national dodgeball team in its maiden appearance in the Asian Dodgeball Championship held in Singapore in 2023.

== Club career ==
In 1991, Khan won bronze with Punjab Reds in the National Football Championship held in Lahore and in 1992, Khan also won the silver at 1992 National Games football, representing Punjab.

Khan played for Wohaib FC from 1992 till 1995. He represented the team at the 1992–93 and the 1993–94 seasons of the National A-Division Football Championship, when the competition was restructured in a league format. He was also member of the Wohaib club which participated in the 1992–93 Asian Club Championship, where the team became the first Pakistani club to pass the qualifying round of the Asian Club Championship.

Khan also represented Defence Club at the 1993–94 Asian Club Championship qualifying round against Oman Club.

== International career ==
In February 1992, Khan competed in the Coca Cola U-16 Cup in Thailand with Pakistan U16. He then captained the team in the 1992 AFC U-16 Championship qualification, finishing fourth in their five-team group at Rajshahi Stadium in Bangladesh in May 1992.

Khan made his senior international debut with Pakistan at the 1992 Jordan International Tournament, where he played all three matches against Jordan, Moldova and Sudan. The next year, he represented the second string Pakistan team at the 1993 ECO Cup, and Pakistan Whites at the 1993 SAARC Gold Cup. He last played with the Pakistan Olympic at the 1996 Summer Olympics qualifiers in 1995 against India and Oman under the captainship of Haroon Yousaf.

Khan led the Pakistan National Dodgeball team in its maiden appearance in Asian Dodgeball Championship held in Singapore in 2023. He captained Pakistan against Malaysia, Singapore, Australia, Taiwan and Hong Kong. Pakistan finished 4th in the Fabric ball category.

== Coaching career ==
After retirement as player, Khan turned to coaching, completing the AFC C-Certificate Football Coaching Course at Lahore in 2006 and AFC B-Certificate coaching course at Lahore in 2014. In July 2007, Khan was appointed as Director Technical of Model Town Football Academy. He also served as Chief Coach of MTFC/MTFA during different tenures.

He was appointed as coach of SNGPL FC in 2013 and raised the team through open trials in 2014. SNGPL FC qualified for Pakistan Premier Football League in 2018 and managed to avoid relegation after drawing a record 14 matches out of 26. The SNGPL Sports Cell suspended its football, hockey and kabaddi teams in 2023 due to unavailability of funds.

He is also working as Director Technical/Coaching for Pakistan Dodgeball Federation since October 2023.
