= 1999 Friendship Tournament =

Tournament details
- Host country: United Arab Emirates
- Dates: 30 October – 3 November 1999
- Teams: 4 (from 2 confederations)
- Venue(s): 2 (in 2 host cities)

Final positions
- Champions: Iraq (1st title)
- Runners-up: United Arab Emirates
- Third place: Estonia
- Fourth place: Turkmenistan

Tournament statistics
- Matches played: 6
- Goals scored: 19 (3.17 per match)
- Top scorer(s): (United Arab Emirates) Muhammad Ali (Turkmenistan) Chariyar Mukhadov (2 goals)

The 1999 Friendship Tournament was the 5th edition of the Friendship Tournament, and was held from 30 October to 3 November 1999 in the United Arab Emirates. Four teams participated: the United Arab Emirates, Estonia, Iraq, and Turkmenistan. Iraq won the tournament.

== Participants ==
- Estonia
- Iraq
- Turkmenistan
- United Arab Emirates

== Standings ==
Pos	Team	Pld	W	D	L	GF	GA	GD	Pts	
1	Iraq	3	1	2	0	6	3	+3	5	Winners
2	United Arab Emirates	3	1	2	0	7	5	+2	5	
3	Estonia	3	0	3	0	4	4	0	3	
4	Turkmenistan	3	0	1	2	2	7	−5	1	

== Matches ==
30 October 1999

Iraq	1–1	Estonia
Kadhim 30'	Report	Mahmoud 27' (o.g.)

Mohammed bin Zayed Stadium, Abu Dhabi
Attendance: 300
Referee: Salah Hamid
30 October 1999

United Arab Emirates	3–1	Turkmenistan
Ali 37', 47'; Said ?'	Report	Mukhadov 66'

Mohammed bin Zayed Stadium, Abu Dhabi
Attendance: 12,000

1 November 1999

Iraq	3–0	Turkmenistan
Wahaib; Hamad; Fawzi	Report

Mohammed bin Zayed Stadium, Abu Dhabi
Attendance: 8,500
1 November 1999

United Arab Emirates	2–2	Estonia
Abdullah 31'; Hamad 81'	Report	Reim 19' (pen.); Oper 38'

Mohammed bin Zayed Stadium, Abu Dhabi
Attendance: 1,000
Referee: Ali Farid

3 November 1999

Estonia	1–1	Turkmenistan
Viikmäe 47'	Report	Mukhadov 36'

Mohammed bin Zayed Stadium, Abu Dhabi
Attendance: 9,000
Referee: Abdulla El Barnai
3 November 1999

United Arab Emirates	2–2	Iraq
?'	Report	Rahim ?'; H.Mohammed ?'

Mohammed bin Zayed Stadium, Abu Dhabi
Attendance: 11,000

== Winner ==
1999 Friendship Tournament

Iraq
First title

== Statistics ==
=== Goalscorers ===
There were 19 goals scored in 6 matches, for an average of 3.17 goals per match.

2 goals

- (United Arab Emirates) Muhammad Ali
- (Turkmenistan) Chariyar Mukhadov

1 goal

- (Estonia) Andres Oper
- (Estonia) Kristen Viikmäe
- (Estonia) Martin Reim
- (Iraq) Abbas Rahim
- (Iraq) Wahaib
- (Iraq) Essam Hamad
- (Iraq) Hesham Mohammed
- (Iraq) Hussam Fawzi
- (Iraq) Ahmed Kadhim
- (United Arab Emirates) Eisaa Abdullah
- (United Arab Emirates) Essam Hamad
- (United Arab Emirates) Hussein Said

1 own goal

- (Iraq) Haidar Mahmoud (against Estonia)
