= Vladimir Ivanchikhin =

Tajikistani footballer

Personal information
- Full name: Vladimir Ivanchikhin
- Date of birth: 1 November 1968 (age 57)
- Position: Goalkeeper

Senior career*
Years	Team	Apps	(Gls)
1992	Sokhibkor Dushanbe		
1993	Pamir Dushanbe		
1993–1994	Kairat	6	(0)
1995	Pamir Dushanbe		

International career
1992–1993	Tajikistan	4	(0)
- * Club domestic league appearances and goals

Vladimir Ivanchikhin (born 1 November 1968) is a retired football player who represented Tajikistan.

== Career statistics ==
=== International ===
Tajikistan
Year	Apps	Goals
1992	1	0
1993	3	0
Total	4	0

Statistics accurate as of 10 September 2015.

== Honours ==
Pamir Dushanbe

- Tajik League: 1995
