= Pavel Mikhalevich =

Belarusian footballer (born 1974)

Personal information
- Date of birth: 22 January 1974 (age 52)
- Place of birth: Minsk, Belarus
- Position: Midfielder

Youth career
- Dinamo Minsk
- –1993: Quick 1888

Senior career*
Years	Team	Apps	(Gls)
1993–2000	NEC Nijmegen	47	(1)
2001–2005	JVC Cuijk		
2005–2006	Achilles '29		
- * Club domestic league appearances and goals

Pavel Mikhalevich (Russian: Павел Михалевич; born 22 January 1974) is a Belarusian former professional footballer who played as a midfielder.

== Career ==
Mikhalevich started his career with Dutch sixth tier side Quick 1888. In 1993, he signed for NEC in the Dutch second tier, where he went on to made 47 Eredivisie appearances scoring 1 goal and suffered a torn achilles tendon. In 2001, he signed for Dutch fifth tier club JVC Cuijk.
