= Ali Asghar Modir Roosta =

Iranian footballer and coach

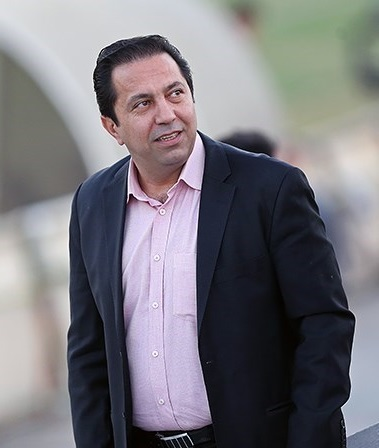

Personal information
- Full name: Ali Asghar Modir Roosta
- Date of birth: 25 July 1968 (age 58)
- Place of birth: Tehran, Iran
- Height: 5 ft 11 in (1.80 m)
- Position: Striker

Senior career*
Years	Team	Apps	(Gls)
1985–1986	Naft		
1986–1987	Daraei		
1989–1993	Pas		
1993–1995	Keshavarz		
1995–2001	Bahman		
2001–2003	Paykan		(16)
2003–2006	Shahab Zanjan		

International career
1990–1998	Iran	30	(9)
1992	Iran futsal	2	(0)

Managerial career
- 2008–2009: Paykan
- 2009–2010: Pas Hamedan
- 2011: Pas Hamedan
- 2011–2012: Shahrdari Tabriz
- * Club domestic league appearances and goals

Ali Asghar Modirrousta (Persian: علی اصغر مدیر روستا, born July 25, 1968) is a retired Iranian football striker and now coach.

Modir Roosta is a former member of Iran national football team. He was also a Futsal player and appeared for Iran national futsal team at the FIFA Futsal World Cup 1992.

== Club career ==
He played for a few clubs in Iran, most notably Pas Tehran, and later in his career Paykan F.C. In season 1996/97, he became the top goalscorer in Iran's top division football league by scoring 18 goals for Bahman FC, helping the club to finish second in the overall standings, just behind the season's champion Persepolis FC.

== International career ==
He played for the Iranian national football team on several occasions during the 1990s, earning an impressive record of 18 goals scored in 32 appearances.

== Career statistics ==
=== International goals ===
#	Date	Venue	Opponent	Score	Result	Competition
1.	13 Jun 1993	Azadi Stadium, Tehran, Iran	Tajikistan	1–0	W	1993 ECO Cup
2.	14 Jun 1993	Azadi Stadium, Tehran, Iran	Turkmenistan	2–1	W	1993 ECO Cup
3.	25 Jun 1993	Azadi Stadium, Tehran, Iran	Chinese Taipei	6–0	W	1994 FIFA World Cup Qualifier
4.	25 Jun 1993	Azadi Stadium, Tehran, Iran	Chinese Taipei	6–0	W	1994 FIFA World Cup Qualifier
5.	25 Jun 1993	Azadi Stadium, Tehran, Iran	Chinese Taipei	6–0	W	1994 FIFA World Cup Qualifier
6.	25 Jun 1993	Azadi Stadium, Tehran, Iran	Chinese Taipei	6–0	W	1994 FIFA World Cup Qualifier
7.	27 Jun 1993	Azadi Stadium, Tehran, Iran	Syria	1–1	D	1994 FIFA World Cup Qualifier
8.	13 Sep 1997	Jinzhou Stadium, Dalian, China	China	4–2	W	1998 FIFA World Cup Qualifier
9.	17 Oct 1997	Azadi Stadium, Tehran, Iran	China	4–1	W	1998 FIFA World Cup Qualifier
Correct as of 24 July 2021

== Coaching career ==
He was appointed as the coach of Paykan in 2008 where he stayed for about a year but was sacked in the last few weeks of the 2008–09 season. He was appointed as the coach of Pas in October 2009 and was sacked by club in June 2011. He was appointed as head coach of Shahrdari Tabriz on 24 December 2011 and took the reins of the club on 1 January 2012 in a match against Mes Kerman which his team lost 1–0. He was sacked at the end of the season when Shahrdari was relegated to the Azadegan League.

=== Coaching career ===
As of 9 March 2013

Team	From	To	Record							
Team	From	To	G	W	D	L	Win %	GF	GA	+/-
Peykan	1 May 2008	15 June 2009	34	13	8	13	45%	43	42	+1
Pas	8 October 2009	18 June 2011	25	8	8	9	32%	28	28	0
Shahrdari Tabriz	1 January 2012	1 June 2012	8	1	3	4	27%	8	11	–3
Total			33	9	11	13	38%	36	39	–3

Awards
Preceded by Mohammad Momeni	Azadegan League top scorer 1996 – 1997	Succeeded by Hossein Khatibi
