= Meklis Koshaliyev =

Personal information
- Full name: Meklis Beyshenovich Koshaliev
- Date of birth: 30 November 1951 (age 74)
- Place of birth: Talas, Kyrgyz SSR
- Position: Midfielder

Youth career
- 19??–1975: Kyrgyzstan State Institute of Physical Culture

Senior career*
Years	Team	Apps	(Gls)
1976–1981	FC Alga Bishkek		
1981–1986	Alay Osh		

Managerial career
- 1986–1991: FC Alga Bishkek
- 1992–1996: Kyrgyzstan
- * Club domestic league appearances and goals

Meklis Beyshenovich Koshaliyev is a former football coach and technical director of the Football Federation of Kyrgyzstan.

Meklis received the honorary title of Honored Worker of Physical Culture and Sports in the Kyrgyz Republic.

== Career ==
Meklis graduated from the Kyrgyzstan State Institute of Physical Culture in 1975, and from 1976 played for FC Alga Bishkek, before moving to Alay Osh in 1981. From 1992 to 1996 he was the manager of the Kyrgyzstan national football team. Currently, he is head of the specialized youth department of the Football Federation of the Kyrgyz Republic.

He took part in a youth football conference in Kuala Lumpur, Malaysia attended by 85 delegates from 45 countries.

The coach conjectures that Kyrgyz football would improve in the future because of the youth system.

== Individual awards ==
- Kyrgyzstan Honored Worker of Physical Culture and Sports
