= Sergey Shiroky =

Belarusian footballer

Personal information
- Date of birth: 24 March 1966 (age 60)
- Place of birth: Bobruisk, Byelorussian SSR, Soviet Union
- Height: 1.81 m (5 ft 11 1/2 in)
- Position: Midfielder

Youth career
- 1983–1985: Dinamo Minsk

Senior career*
| Years | Team | Apps | (Gls) |
| 1986–1990 | Dinamo Minsk | 89 | (10) |
| 1990–1992 | Amirani Ochamchire | 36 | (5) |
| 1992–1994 | Dinamo-93 Minsk | 53 | (12) |
| 1994–1995 | Dinamo Minsk | 41 | (0) |
| 1996 | Dinamo-93 Minsk | 10 | (2) |
| 1997 | Torpedo Minsk | 16 | (0) |
| 1997 | Belshina Bobruisk | 2 | (0) |
| 1998 | Shakhtyor Soligorsk | 11 | (1) |

International career
| 1994 | Belarus | 1 | (0) |
- * Club domestic league appearances and goals

Sergey Shiroky (Belarusian: Сяргей Шырокі; Russian: Сергей Широкий; born 24 March 1966) is a retired Belarusian professional footballer and Belarus international.

== Honours ==
Dinamo Minsk

- Belarusian Premier League champion: 1994–95, 1995
