= Vidadi Rzayev =

Azerbaijani footballer (born 1967)

Personal information
- Full name: Vidadi Vagif oglu Rzayev
- Date of birth: 4 September 1967 (age 59)
- Place of birth: Ganja, Azerbaijan SSR, Soviet Union
- Height: 1.69 m (5 ft 7 in)
- Position: Midfielder

Senior career*
Years	Team	Apps	(Gls)
1986–1991	Kapaz Kirovabad	17	(3)
1986–1991	Neftchi Baku	96	(7)
1991	Dynamo Ganja	4	(2)
1991	Neftchi Baku	31	(2)
1992–1993	Terek Grozny	15	(1)
1993–1995	Turan Tovuz	44	(7)
1995–1996	Neftchi Baku	10	(2)
1996	Turan Tovuz	11	(2)
1996–1998	Neftchi Baku	46	(10)
1998–2000	Kapaz PFC	54	(22)
2000	Erzurumspor	5	(0)
2000–2001	Shamkir	13	(3)
2001	FK Qarabağ	8	(3)
2001–2002	FK Shamkir	15	(8)
2002–2003	Sanat Mes Kerman F.C.	?	(?)
2003–2005	Neftchi Baku	36	(2)
2005–2007	Olimpik Baku	33	(3)
Total		435	(77)

International career
1992–2001	Azerbaijan	35	(5)

Managerial career
- 2007–2008: FK Karvan
- 2008–2009: FC Gabala (scout)
- 2011: Kapaz PFC (assistant)
- * Club domestic league appearances and goals

Vidadi Rzayev (Azerbaijani: Vidadi Rzayev; born 4 September 1967) is a retired football midfielder from Azerbaijan. On 31 August 1996, Rzayev's goal gave to Azerbaijan the first victory ever in European qualifying tournament, when Azerbaijan defeated Switzerland 1–0 in Baku. He currently works for FC Gabala as a scout.

== Career statistics ==
=== International goals ===
#	Date	Venue	Opponent	Score	Result	Competition
1.	17 September 1992	David Kipiani Stadium, Gurjaani, Georgia	Georgia	6-3	Lost	Friendly
2.	6 June 1993	Azadi Stadium, Tehran, Iran	Tajikistan	2-0	Win	1993 ECO Cup
3.	7 June 1993	Azadi Stadium, Tehran, Iran	Kyrgyzstan	3-2	Win	1993 ECO Cup
4.	31 August 1996	Tofik Bakhramov Stadium, Baku, Azerbaijan	Switzerland	1-0	Win	1998 WC qualification
5.	15 February 2001	Spartak Stadium, Varna, Bulgaria	Uzbekistan	1-2	Lost	Friendly
Correct as of 13 January 2013

== Honours ==
=== Club ===
==== Turan Tovuz ====
- Azerbaijan Premier League: 1993–94

==== Neftchi Baku ====
- Azerbaijan Premier League: 1995–96, 2004–05
- Azerbaijan Cup: 1995–96, 2003–04

==== Kapaz ====
- Azerbaijan Premier League: 1998–99
- Azerbaijan Cup: 1999–2000

==== Shamkir ====
- Azerbaijan Premier League: 2000–01

=== Individual ===
- Azerbaijani Footballer of the Year: 1996
- Azerbaijan Premier League top goalscorer: 1999
- CIS Cup best player: 2005
