= Muslim Agaýew =

Turkmenistan footballer

Personal information
- Full name: Muslim Baýramovich Agaýew
- Date of birth: 29 April 1974 (age 52)
- Place of birth: Mary, Turkmen SSR, Soviet Union
- Height: 1.77 m (5 ft 9 1/2 in)
- Positions: Forward; midfielder

Senior career*
Years	Team	Apps	(Gls)
1991	Merw Mary	27	(9)
1992–1993	Nebitchi Balkanabat		
1994–1998	Köpetdag Aşgabat		
1999	Kremin Kremenchuk	14	(2)
1999	Nyva Ternopil	12	(1)
2000	Access Petropavl	17	(9)
2001–2002	Esil-Bogatyr Petropavl	35	(7)
2002	Esil Kokshetau	8	(2)
2003–2005	Irtysh Pavlodar	60	(19)
2006	Esil-Bogatyr Petropavl	11	(0)
2006	Tobol Kostanay	11	(2)
2007	Merw Mary	0	(0)

International career
1994–2007	Turkmenistan	9	(3)
- * Club domestic league appearances and goals as of 13 May 2010

Muslim Baýramovich Agaýew (Russian: Муслим Байрамович Агаев; born 29 April 1974) is a Turkmen professional football player.
