= Miyoshi Athletic Stadium =

Athletic stadium in Miyoshi, Hiroshima, Japan

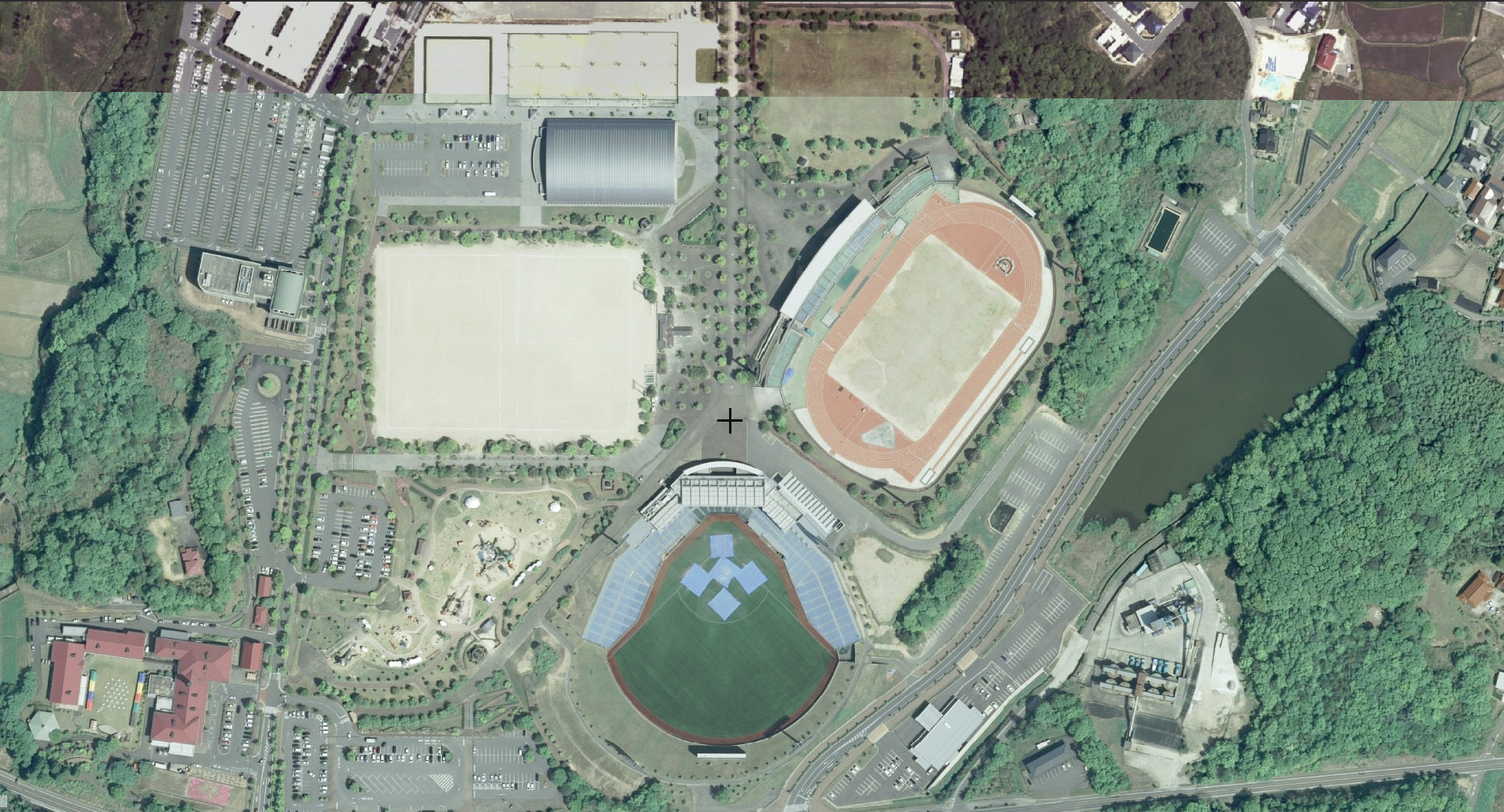
- Interactive map of Miyoshi Athletic Stadium
- Location: Miyoshi, Hiroshima, Japan
- Owner: Miyoshi City
- Capacity: 10,000

Construction
- Opened: 1993

Miyoshi Athletic Stadium (みよし運動公園陸上競技場) is an athletic stadium in Miyoshi, Hiroshima, Japan.
