= Dmitry Korzh =

Turkmenistani footballer

Dmitriý Korj
Personal information
- Full name: Dmitriý Mihaýlowiç Korj
- Date of birth: 29 October 1971 (age 55)
- Place of birth: Turkmen SSR, Soviet Union
- Height: 1.82 m (6 ft 0 in)
- Position: Defender

Senior career*
Years	Team	Apps	(Gls)
1989–1991	Köpetdag Aşgabat	81	(1)
1992–1995	Köpetdag Aşgabat	?	(?)
1996–1997	Uralan	2	(0)
1996	Lokomotiv Chita	11	(0)
1998–1999	Nisa Aşgabat	?	(?)
1999	Elektron Romny	1	(0)
1999	Naftovyk-Ukrnafta	10	(0)
2000	Nisa Aşgabat	?	(?)
2001	Köpetdag Aşgabat	?	(?)
2002	Nebitçi Balkanabat	?	(?)
2003	Şagadam	?	(?)
2004–2005	Köpetdag Aşgabat	?	(?)

International career^{‡}
1992–1999	Turkmenistan	?	(?)
- * Club domestic league appearances and goals as of 15 March 2016 ‡ National team caps and goals as of 15 March 2016

Dmitriý Mihaýlowiç Korj (Ukrainian: Дмитро Михайлович Корж; born 29 October 1971) is a retired Turkmenistani footballer, and assistant coach of the Altyn Asyr FK as of 2015. He also holds Ukrainian citizenship.

== Club career ==
He started playing in Köpetdag Aşgabat, in seasons from 1989 to 1992 in the Soviet Second League. From 1992 to 1995, he played in the Turkmenistan Ýokary Liga.

For the 1996 season in Russia, he played for the first league of FC Uralan and FC Lokomotiv Chita.

He returned to Turkmenistan, playing for Nisa Aşgabat, again becoming the champion of Turkmenistan. In autumn 1999 he played in Ukraine for FC Elektron Romny and FC Naftovyk-Ukrnafta. Starting in 2000 he played again in Turkmenistan for FC Nisa and FC Köpetdag.

== International career ==
He played for the Turkmenistan national football team and was a member of the final tournament of the 1994 Asian Games.

== Coaching career ==
He has been head coach of FC Bagtyyarlyk at 2009. Since 2015, he works as a coach for Altyn Asyr FK, in international games, as head coach.
