= Wael Sulaiman =

Kuwaiti footballer

Personal information
- Full name: Wael Sulaiman Al-Habashi
- Date of birth: August 8, 1964 (age 62)
- Place of birth: Kuwait City
- Height: 1.74 m (5 ft 9 in)
- Position: Defender

Youth career
- Al-Jahra SC

Senior career*
Years	Team	Apps	(Gls)
1981–1999	Al-Jahra SC		

International career
1984–1998	Kuwait	109	(19)
- * Club domestic league appearances and goals

Wael Sulaiman Al-Habashi (Arabic: وائل سليمان أحمد المحيسن الحبشي; born August 8, 1964) is a Kuwaiti retired football player who was the first player of the Kuwait national football team to score a golden goal. The goal was scored against the UAE in 1994.

== Club career ==
Sulaiman played his entire career for Al-Jahra, where he won the 1989–90 Kuwait Premier League.

== International career ==
Sulaiman was part of the Kuwaiti team which won the 8th Arabian Gulf Cup. However, he played his first international match against China in the 1986 Asian Games quarterfinals, where his team reached the third place. Later on, he won both the 10th Arabian Gulf Cup and 13th Arabian Gulf Cup. Between the two aforementioned tournaments, he managed to finish third with his team at the 1994 Asian Games, where he was the top scorer with six goals.

He retired on 27 December 1998, becoming the first Kuwaiti to have more than 100 caps.

== Honour ==
- AFC Century Award

== See also ==
- List of men's footballers with 100 or more international caps
