= Bingo Stadium =

Multi-use stadium in Onomichi, Hiroshima, Japan

Coordinates: 34°26′0″N 133°10′39″E

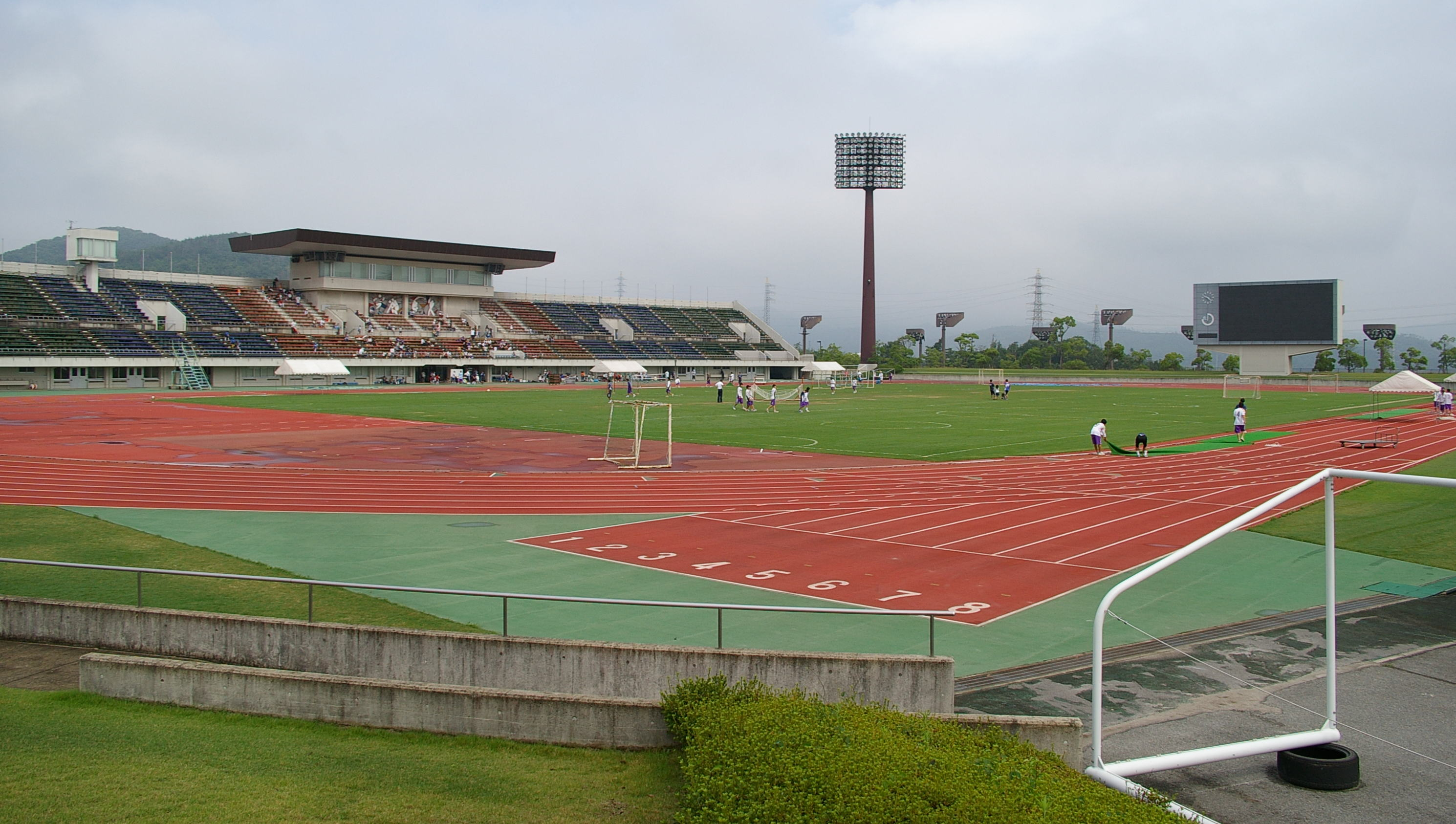
- Interactive map of Bingo Stadium
- Location: Onomichi, Hiroshima, Japan
- Owner: Hiroshima Prefecture
- Capacity: 9,245
- Surface: Grass
- Field size: 107 x 68 m

Construction
- Opened: 1993

Bingo Stadium (広島県立びんご運動公園陸上競技場) is a multi-use stadium in Onomichi, Hiroshima, Japan. It is used mostly for football matches and was used as a venue for the 1992 AFC Asian Cup. The stadium has a capacity of 10,000 people.

== History ==
The stadium has been used as a venue for several international sporting events, beginning with the 1992 AFC Asian Cup. The stadium was also a venue for the 1994 Asian Games football events.

On February 1, 2022, the Bingo Stadium grounds were officially named "Kozakakun Sports Park Bingo" (Japanese: こざかなくんスポーツパークびんご). The rights were purchased by Kataoka Co., Ltd. for 3 million yen (about US$20,000) per year. The agreement between Kataoka and Hiroshima Prefecture is for five years and will end on March 31, 2027.

In June 2022, the stadium was renovated to achieve Japan Association of Athletics Federations Type 2 certification.
