= Çaryýar Muhadow =

Turkmen footballer (born 1969)

Çariýar Muhadow
Personal information
- Full name: Çariýar Abdurahmanowiç Muhadow
- Date of birth: 12 November 1969 (age 56)
- Place of birth: Ashgabat, Soviet Union
- Height: 1.78 m (5 ft 10 in)
- Position: Forward

Senior career*
Years	Team	Apps	(Gls)
1986–1988	Köpetdag Aşgabat	57	(18)
1989–1991	Pamir Dushanbe	54	(10)
1992–1993	Köpetdag Aşgabat		
1993–1994	Ankaragücü	6	(1)
1994–1995	Köpetdag Aşgabat		
1996–1997	Lada Togliatti	37	(10)
1998	Köpetdag Aşgabat		
1999–2000	Nisa Aşgabat		
2001	Atyrau	4	(0)
2001	Vostok	15	(1)
2002	Nisa Aşgabat		
2003	Köpetdag Aşgabat		
2003–2004	Şagadam Türkmenbaşy		

International career
1992–2000	Turkmenistan	24	(15)
- * Club domestic league appearances and goals

Çariýar Abdurahmanowiç Muhadow (born 12 November 1969) is a former Turkmen footballer.

== Club career ==
Muhadow began his career playing for Pamir Dushanbe in the Soviet Top League and later played for Lada Togliatti in the Russian Premier League. He also had a spell with Ankaragücü in the Turkish Super Lig.

== International career ==
Muhadow made several appearances for the senior Turkmenistan national football team from 1992 to 1999, and is one of the team's leading goal-scorers with 13 goals.

== Personal life ==
His son Süleýman Muhadow is an international footballer for Turkmenistan.

== International goals ==
No.	Date	Venue	Opponent	Score	Result	Competition
1.	25 October 1992	Ashgabat, Turkmenistan	Uzbekistan	1–0	1–0	Friendly
2.	5 October 1994	Onomichi, Japan	Iran	1–0	1–1	1994 Asian Games
3.	7 October 1994	Hiroshima, Japan	Yemen	1–0	4–0	1994 Asian Games
4.	7 October 1994	Hiroshima, Japan	Yemen	3–0	4–0	1994 Asian Games
5.	7 October 1994	Hiroshima, Japan	Yemen	4–0	4–0	1994 Asian Games
6.	30 October 1999	Abu Dhabi, UAE	United Arab Emirates	1–?	1–3	1999 Friendship Tournament
7.	3 November 1999	Abu Dhabi, UAE	Estonia	1–0	1–1	1999 Friendship Tournament
8.	14 February 2000	Kuwait City, Kuwait	Nepal	3–0	5–0	2000 AFC Asian Cup qualification
9.	14 February 2000	Kuwait City, Kuwait	Nepal	4–0	5–0	2000 AFC Asian Cup qualification
