= Berdimyrat Nurmyradow =

Turkmenistan footballer and manager

Berdymyrat Nurmyradow
Personal information
- Date of birth: 28 August 1968 (age 58)
- Place of birth: Turkmenistan, USSR
- Position: Forward

Senior career*
Years	Team	Apps	(Gls)
1985–1991	Kolhozçi/Köpetdag Aşgabat	128	(22)
1992–1999	Köpetdag Aşgabat		(38)
2000	Nisa Aşgabat		
2002	Köpetdag Aşgabat		
2002	Garagum Türkmenabat		

International career
1992–1994	Turkmenistan	16	(5)

Managerial career
- 2003–2007: Köpetdag Aşgabat
- 2008: Altyn Asyr FK
- * Club domestic league appearances and goals

Berdymyrat Nurmyradow (Russian: Бердымурад Нурмурадов; born 28 August 1968 in USSR) is a Turkmenistan professional football player and manager.

== Career ==
In 1985, he began his professional career for the Kolhozçi Aşgabat. In 2000, he played for the Nisa Aşgabat. In 2002, he returned to Köpetdag Aşgabat. Footballer finished his career in the Garagum Türkmenabat.

In 1992, he made his debut for the Turkmenistan national football team.

In 2003, he started his coaching career in Köpetdag Aşgabat and after managed until the club dissolved in 2007. In 2008, together with Alikper Gurbani, headed the FC Altyn Asyr.
