= 1995 Commonwealth of Independent States Cup =

CIS Cup, Кубок Содружества 1995

Tournament details
- Host country: Russia
- Dates: 29 January – 4 February 1995
- Teams: 16
- Venue: 3 (in 1 host city)

Final positions
- Champions: (Russia) Spartak Moscow (3rd title)

Tournament statistics
- Matches played: 27
- Goals scored: 103 (3.81 per match)
- Top scorer(s): (Russia) Ilya Tsymbalar (6 goals)

The 1995 Commonwealth of Independent States Cup was the third edition of the competition between the champions of former republics of Soviet Union. It was won third time in a row by Spartak Moscow who defeated Georgian side Dinamo Tbilisi in the final. This was the first time Ukraine was represented at the tournament, as well as the first time when three points were awarded for a win.

== Participants ==
Team	Qualification	Participation
(Russia) Spartak Moscow	1994 Russian Top League champions	3rd
(Ukraine) Shakhtar Donetsk	1993–94 Vyshcha Liha runners-up ^{1}	1st
(Belarus) Dinamo Minsk	1993–94 Belarusian Premier League champions	2nd
(Lithuania) Žalgiris Vilnius	1994–95 A Lyga 1st team as of the winter break	1st
(Latvia) Skonto Riga	1994 Latvian Higher League champions	3rd
(Estonia) Flora Tallinn	1993–94 Meistriliiga champions	1st
(Moldova) Zimbru Chișinău	1993–94 Moldovan National Division champions	3rd
(Georgia (country)) Dinamo Tbilisi	1993–94 Umaglesi Liga champions	3rd
(Azerbaijan) Neftchi Baku	1994–95 Azerbaijan Top League 1st team as of the winter break ^{2}	2nd
(Armenia) Shirak Gyumri	1994 Armenian Premier League champions	1st
(Kazakhstan) Yelimay Semipalatinsk	1994 Kazakhstan Premier League champions	1st
(Uzbekistan) Nuravshon Bukhara	1994 Uzbek League runners-up ^{3}	1st
(Tajikistan) Sitora Dushanbe	1994 Tajik League champions	2nd
(Kyrgyzstan) Kant-Oil	1994 Kyrgyzstan League champions	1st
(Turkmenistan) Köpetdag Aşgabat	1994 Ýokary Liga champions	3rd
Russia U21 national team	Unofficial entry, not eligible to advance past group stage.	2nd

- ^{1} Shakhtar Donetsk replaced Dynamo Kyiv (1993–94 Ukrainian champions), who refused to participate citing unwillingness to play at the traumatic artificial pitch.
- ^{2} Neftchi Baku replaced Turan Tovuz (1993–94 Azerbaijan champions).
- ^{3} Nuravshon Bukhara replaced Neftchi Fergana (1994 Uzbekistan champions).

== Group stage ==
=== Group A ===
Team	Pld	W	D	L	GF	GA	GD	Pts
(Russia) Spartak Moscow	3	3	0	0	13	1	+12	9
(Lithuania) Žalgiris Vilnius	3	2	0	1	8	4	+4	6
(Azerbaijan) Neftchi Baku	3	1	0	2	1	6	−5	3
(Tajikistan) Sitora Dushanbe	3	0	0	3	0	11	−11	0

==== Results ====
29 January 1995
18:00

Neftchi Baku (Azerbaijan)	0 – 1	(Lithuania) Žalgiris Vilnius
		Vencevičius 54'

Spartak Manege, Moscow
Attendance: 1,000
Referee: Viktor Derdo (Ukraine)
29 January 1995
19:00

Spartak Moscow (Russia)	4 – 0	(Tajikistan) Sitora Dushanbe
Mukhamadiev 18'; Tsymbalar 26', 87'; V.Onopko 47'

CSKA Palace of Sports, Moscow
Attendance: 4,300
Referee: Slavik Kazaryan (Armenia)

30 January 1995
16:00

Sitora Dushanbe (Tajikistan)	0 – 6	(Lithuania) Žalgiris Vilnius
		Jankauskas 1', 44'; Mikulėnas 25', 65'; Balsevičius 80'; Preikšaitis 88'

Spartak Manege, Moscow
Attendance: 500
Referee: Babur Khaydarov (Uzbekistan)
30 January 1995
19:00

Spartak Moscow (Russia)	5 – 0	(Azerbaijan) Neftchi Baku
Vyalichka 20'; Tsymbalar 31', 75'; Mukhamadiev 50'; Kechinov 55'

CSKA Palace of Sports, Moscow
Attendance: 3,200
Referee: Boriss Adjutovs (Latvia)

31 January 1995
14:00

Neftchi Baku (Azerbaijan)	1 – 0	(Tajikistan) Sitora Dushanbe
Vahabzade 17'

Spartak Manege, Moscow
Attendance: 150
Referee: Abdygany Radzhapov (Kyrgyzstan)
31 January 1995
19:00

Žalgiris Vilnius (Lithuania)	1 – 4	(Russia) Spartak Moscow
Urbonas 20'		Kechinov 30'; Pisarev 56'; Tsymbalar 58'; Nikiforov 80' (pen.)

CSKA Palace of Sports, Moscow
Attendance: 4,000
Referee: Alexander Koulakov (Kazakhstan)

=== Group B ===
Team	Pld	W	D	L	GF	GA	GD	Pts
(Latvia) Skonto Riga	3	2	1	0	10	1	+9	7
(Turkmenistan) Köpetdag Aşgabat	3	1	2	0	5	1	+4	5
(Belarus) Dinamo Minsk	3	1	1	1	10	7	+3	4
(Kyrgyzstan) Kant-Oil	3	0	0	3	1	17	−16	0

==== Results ====
29 January 1995
14:00

Köpetdag Aşgabat (Turkmenistan)	4 – 0	(Kyrgyzstan) Kant-Oil
Seydiev 13' (pen.); Annadurdiyew 35'; K.Meredow 54'; Nurmyradow 82'

Spartak Manege, Moscow
Attendance: 500
Referee: Valentin Ivanov (Russia)
29 January 1995
16:00

Skonto Riga (Latvia)	6 – 0	(Belarus) Dinamo Minsk
Zemļinskis 2' (pen.); Semjonovs 41'; Astafjevs 53'; Štolcers 55'; Jeļisejevs 72', 88'

Dynamo Manage, Moscow
Attendance: 2,000
Referee: Sergei Khusainov (Russia)

30 January 1995
14:00

Köpetdag Aşgabat (Turkmenistan)	0 – 0	(Latvia) Skonto Riga

Dynamo Manage, Moscow
Attendance: 800
Referee: Viktor Filippov (Russia)
30 January 1995
17:00

Kant-Oil (Kyrgyzstan)	0 – 9	(Belarus) Dinamo Minsk
		Putilo 10'; Mayorov 37'; Kachura 62', 74'; Demenkovets 64'; Zhuravel 67'; Astrowski 70'; Charnyawski 79', 83'

CSKA Palace of Sports, Moscow
Attendance: 1,000
Referee: Oleg Timofejev (Estonia)

31 January 1995
14:00

Dinamo Minsk (Belarus)	1 – 1	(Turkmenistan) Köpetdag Aşgabat
Zhuravel 27'		Seydiev 56' (pen.)

Dynamo Manage, Moscow
Attendance: 500
Referee: Vladimir Ovchinnikov (Russia)
31 January 1995
18:00

Skonto Riga (Latvia)	4 – 1	(Kyrgyzstan) Kant-Oil
Štolcers 37'; Zemļinskis 52' (pen.); Klishin 70'; Sļesarčuks 78'		Izrailov 53'

Spartak Manege, Moscow
Attendance: 100
Referee: Yevgeni Volnin (Russia)

=== Group C ===
- Unofficial table

Team	Pld	W	D	L	GF	GA	GD	Pts
(Georgia (country)) Dinamo Tbilisi	3	3	0	0	10	3	+7	9
Russia U21	3	2	0	1	10	7	+3	6
(Moldova) Zimbru Chișinău	3	0	1	2	1	4	−3	1
(Kazakhstan) Yelimay Semipalatinsk	3	0	1	2	3	10	−7	1

- Official table

Team	Pld	W	D	L	GF	GA	GD	Pts
(Georgia (country)) Dinamo Tbilisi	2	2	0	0	6	1	+5	6
(Moldova) Zimbru Chișinău	2	0	1	1	0	2	−2	1
(Kazakhstan) Yelimay Semipalatinsk	2	0	1	1	1	4	−3	1

==== Results ====
29 January 1995
16:00

Zimbru Chișinău (Moldova)	0 – 0	(Kazakhstan) Yelimay Semipalatinsk

Spartak Manege, Moscow
Attendance: 500
Referee: Sergei Anokhin (Russia)
29 January 1995
17:00

Dinamo Tbilisi (Georgia (country))	4 – 2	Russia U21
Kavelashvili 3', 38'; Kinkladze 9'; Jamarauli 77'		Nekrasov 15'; Klyuyev 19'

CSKA Palace of Sports, Moscow
Attendance: 4,000
Referee: Alexander Koulakov (Kazakhstan)

30 January 1995
14:00

Russia U21	6 – 2	(Kazakhstan) Yelimay Semipalatinsk
Mashkarin 21' (pen.); Gerasimov 30'; Nekrasov 32'; Konovalov 49'; Berketov 54'; Fayzulin 73'		Sidorov 10'; Gasanov 78'

Spartak Manege, Moscow
Attendance: 150
Referee: Takhir Souleimanov (Azerbaijan)
30 January 1995
18:00

Dinamo Tbilisi (Georgia (country))	2 – 0	(Moldova) Zimbru Chișinău
Kavelashvili 46', 59'

Dynamo Manage, Moscow
Attendance: 2,800
Referee: Valentin Ivanov (Russia)

31 January 1995
16:00

Zimbru Chișinău (Moldova)	1 – 2	Russia U21
Miterev 43'		Movsisyan 25'; Mashkarin 60' (pen.)

Dynamo Manage, Moscow
Attendance: 1,000
Referee: Boriss Adjutovs (Latvia)
31 January 1995
18:00

Yelimay Semipalatinsk (Kazakhstan)	1 – 4	(Georgia (country)) Dinamo Tbilisi
Litvinenko 36'		Beradze 34'; Kavelashvili 63'; Iashvili 78', 84'

Dynamo Manage, Moscow
Attendance: 3,500
Referee: Sergei Anokhin (Russia)

=== Group D ===
Team	Pld	W	D	L	GF	GA	GD	Pts
(Ukraine) Shakhtar Donetsk	3	3	0	0	8	3	+5	9
(Armenia) Shirak Gyumri	3	2	0	1	6	4	+2	6
(Uzbekistan) Nuravshon Bukhara	3	1	0	2	6	10	−4	3
(Estonia) Flora Tallinn	3	0	0	3	1	4	−3	0

==== Results ====
29 January 1995
14:00

Nuravshon Bukhara (Uzbekistan)	2 – 1	(Estonia) Flora Tallinn
Kovshov 12'; Ishmirzaev 31' (pen.)		Kristal 4'

Dynamo Manage, Moscow
Attendance: 1,500
Referee: Vladimir Ovchinnikov (Russia)
29 January 1995
18:00

Shakhtar Donetsk (Ukraine)	2 – 1	(Armenia) Shirak Gyumri
Atelkin 53'; Petrov 62'		Petrosyan 9'

Dynamo Manage, Moscow
Attendance: 1,000
Referee: Tamaz Latsabidze (Georgia)

30 January 1995
16:00

Nuravshon Bukhara (Uzbekistan)	2 – 5	(Ukraine) Shakhtar Donetsk
Ageev 38'; Tillyaev 81' (pen.)		Pohodin 23'; Matveyev 25'; Stolovytskyi 50'; Shyshchenko 82'; S.Onopko 87'

Dynamo Manage, Moscow
Attendance: 1,500
Referee: Vadim Zhuk (Belarus)
30 January 1995
18:00

Flora Tallinn (Estonia)	0 – 1	(Armenia) Shirak Gyumri
		Grigoryan 23'

Spartak Manege, Moscow
Attendance: 500
Referee: Anatolie Ianeț (Moldova)

31 January 1995
16:00

Shakhtar Donetsk (Ukraine)	1 – 0	(Estonia) Flora Tallinn
Shyshchenko 61'

Spartak Manege, Moscow
Attendance: 200
Referee: Viktor Filippov (Russia)
31 January 1995
17:00

Shirak Gyumri (Armenia)	4 – 2	(Uzbekistan) Nuravshon Bukhara
Grigoryan 12'; Vardanyan 29', 43' (pen.); Markaryan 35'		Ageev 32'; Sharipov 59' (pen.)

CSKA Palace of Sports, Moscow
Attendance: 2,500
Referee: Eldar Ramazanov (Turkmenistan)

== Final rounds ==
Semi-finals (2 Feb)
(Russia)	Spartak Moscow	3
(Latvia)	Skonto Riga	0
(Georgia (country))	Dinamo Tbilisi	1
(Ukraine)	Shakhtar Donetsk	0

Final (4 Feb)
(Russia)	Spartak Moscow	5
(Georgia (country))	Dinamo Tbilisi	1

=== Semi-finals ===
2 February 1995
16:30

Dinamo Tbilisi (Georgia (country))	1 – 0	(Ukraine) Shakhtar Donetsk
Kinkladze 86' (pen.)

CSKA Palace of Sports, Moscow
Attendance: 4,500
Referee: Sergei Khusainov (Russia)
2 February 1995
19:00

Spartak Moscow (Russia)	3 – 0	(Latvia) Skonto Riga
Tsymbalar 40'; Nikiforov 60' (pen.); Pisarev 90'

CSKA Palace of Sports, Moscow
Attendance: 4,400
Referee: Tamaz Latsabidze (Georgia)

=== Final ===
4 February 1995
18:00

Spartak Moscow (Russia)	5 – 1	(Georgia (country)) Dinamo Tbilisi
Pisarev 13'; Alenichev 58'; Mukhamadiev 61'; Kechinov 83'; Tikhonov 85'		Kinkladze 63'

CSKA Palace of Sports, Moscow
Attendance: 6,500
Referee: Vadim Zhuk (Belarus)

== Top scorers ==
Rank	Player	Team	Goals
1	(Russia) Ilya Tsymbalar	(Russia) Spartak Moscow	6
2	(Georgia (country)) Mikheil Kavelashvili	(Georgia (country)) Dinamo Tbilisi	5
3	(Russia) Valery Kechinov	(Russia) Spartak Moscow	3
3	(Russia) Mukhsin Mukhamadiev	(Russia) Spartak Moscow	3
3	(Russia) Nikolai Pisarev	(Russia) Spartak Moscow	3
3	(Georgia (country)) Georgi Kinkladze	(Georgia (country)) Dinamo Tbilisi	3
