= 2016 Commonwealth of Independent States Cup =

CIS Cup, Кубок Содружества 2016

Tournament details
- Host country: Russia
- Dates: 17–23 January 2016
- Teams: 8
- Venue: 1 (in 1 host city)

Final positions
- Champions: Russia (3rd title)
- Runners-up: Moldova

Tournament statistics
- Matches played: 16
- Goals scored: 38 (2.38 per match)
- Top scorer(s): (Russia) Mikhail Zhabkin (3 goals)

2016 Commonwealth of Independent States Cup was the 24th annual Commonwealth of Independent States Cup since its establishment in 1993. It was hosted in Saint Petersburg, Russia between 17 and 23 January 2016. This event was the last edition of the cup.

Saint Petersburg hosted the event for the seventh time, with all matches being held in a single venue (Saint Petersburg Sports and Concert Complex). All participating nations were represented by their youth (U20/U21) national teams.

== Format ==
This edition sees a reduction in sides to eight Under 21 teams. The number of participants was reduced from 12 to 8, split in two groups of four. Group winners advanced to the final match, while the rest of the teams decided overall 3rd, 5th and 7th places in a single knockout round.

== Participants ==
The following 8 teams, shown with age of youth national team, took part in the tournament:

Team	Coach	Notes	Participation
Russia U21	(Russia) Nikolai Pisarev	Host	14th
Belarus U21	(Belarus) Igor Kovalevich		5th
Latvia U21	(Latvia) Dainis Kazakevičs		5th
Estonia U21	(Estonia) Martin Reim		5th
Moldova U21	(Moldova) Dănuț Oprea		5th
Kazakhstan U21	(Kazakhstan) Serik Abdualiyev		5th
Tajikistan U20	(Ukraine) Roman Pylypchuk		5th
Kyrgyzstan U20	(Kyrgyzstan) Mirlan Eshenov		5th

== Group stage ==
All subsequent times UTC+3

=== Group A ===
Team	Pld	W	D	L	GF	GA	GD	Pts
Moldova	3	2	0	1	4	2	+2	6
Kyrgyzstan	3	1	1	1	3	4	−1	4
Belarus	3	1	1	1	2	2	0	4
Kazakhstan	3	0	2	1	2	3	−1	2

- Kyrgyzstan placed above Belarus by better head-to-head result

==== Results ====
17 January 2016
12:00

Belarus	0–1	Kyrgyzstan
		Israilov 39' (pen.)

Petersburg SCC, Saint Petersburg
Attendance: 300
Referee: Yevgeni Kukulyak (Russia)
17 January 2016
14:15

Kazakhstan	0–1	Moldova
		Spătaru 68'

Petersburg SCC, Saint Petersburg
Attendance: 150
Referee: Aleksey Avtukhovich (Russia)

19 January 2016
12:00

Moldova	2–0	Kyrgyzstan
Rebenja 55'; Paireli 85'

Petersburg SCC, Saint Petersburg
Attendance: 300
Referee: Igor Panin (Russia)
19 January 2016
14:15

Kazakhstan	0–0	Belarus

Petersburg SCC, Saint Petersburg
Attendance: 150
Referee: Aleksandr Borisov (Russia)

21 January 2016
12:00

Belarus	2–1	Moldova
Zaleski 45+2' (pen.); Korzun 59'		Cărăruș 55'

Petersburg SCC, Saint Petersburg
Attendance: 300
Referee: Pavel Shadykhanov (Russia)
21 January 2016
14:15

Kyrgyzstan	2–2	Kazakhstan
Umarov 52' (pen.); Bokoleev 90'		Kuksin 32'; Tungyshbaev 74'

Petersburg SCC, Saint Petersburg
Attendance: 200
Referee: Artem Lyubimov (Russia)

=== Group B ===
Team	Pld	W	D	L	GF	GA	GD	Pts
Russia	3	3	0	0	6	3	+3	9
Estonia	3	2	0	1	7	4	+3	6
Latvia	3	1	0	2	5	6	−1	3
Tajikistan	3	0	0	3	4	9	−5	0

==== Results ====
17 January 2016
16:30

Latvia	1–2	Estonia
Ikaunieks 17'		Kauber 9'; Kokla 89'

Petersburg SCC, Saint Petersburg
Attendance: 500
Referee: Artem Lyubimov (Russia)
17 January 2016
19:00

Russia	2–1	Tajikistan
Zhabkin 30', 78'		Ergashev 10'

Petersburg SCC, Saint Petersburg
Attendance: 2,000
Referee: Pavel Shadykhanov (Russia)

19 January 2016
16:30

Tajikistan	1–4	Estonia
Umarbayev 60' (pen.)		Saliste 23'; Järva 27'; Miller 62'; Kauber 90+1'

Petersburg SCC, Saint Petersburg
Attendance: 500
Referee: Pavel Kukuyan (Russia)
19 January 2016
19:00

Russia	2–1	Latvia
Koryan 30'; Salamatov 82'		Klimaševičs 39'

Petersburg SCC, Saint Petersburg
Attendance: 1,500
Referee: Ivan Saraev (Russia)

21 January 2016
16:30

Latvia	3–2	Tajikistan
Kazačoks 23' (pen.); Vorobjovs 50'; Šadčins 87'		Umarbayev 64'; Babadjanov 81'

Petersburg SCC, Saint Petersburg
Attendance: 500
Referee: Yevgeni Kukulyak (Russia)
21 January 2016
19:00

Estonia	1–2	Russia
Järva 82'		Zhabkin 3'; Sheydayev 37'

Petersburg SCC, Saint Petersburg
Attendance: 1,500
Referee: Aleksey Avtukhovich (Russia)

== Final round ==
=== Seventh-place match ===
23 January 2016
11:00

Kazakhstan	3–2	Tajikistan
Agaysin 2'; Aimbetov 13', 83'		Babadjanov 17'; Ergashev 84'

Petersburg SCC, Saint Petersburg
Attendance: 300
Referee: Igor Panin (Russia)

=== Fifth-place match ===
23 January 2016
13:15

Belarus	0–0	Latvia
Penalties
Pavlovets (penalty scored); Zinovich (penalty scored); Zaleski (penalty scored); Gromyko (penalty scored); Poznyak (penalty missed); Yasyukevich (penalty scored)	5–4	(penalty scored) Šadčins; (penalty missed) Kiriļins; (penalty scored) Flaksis; (penalty scored) Ikaunieks; (penalty scored) Ivanovs; (penalty missed) Koļesovs

Petersburg SCC, Saint Petersburg
Attendance: 300
Referee: Pavel Kukuyan (Russia)

=== Third-place match ===
23 January 2016
15:30

Kyrgyzstan	0–0	Estonia
Penalties
Umarov (penalty missed); Duyshobekov (penalty missed); Karipov (penalty scored)	1–4	(penalty scored) Juhkam; (penalty scored) Aloe; (penalty scored) Ojamaa; (penalty scored) Kauber

Petersburg SCC, Saint Petersburg
Attendance: 1,500
Referee: Aleksandr Borisov (Russia)

=== Final ===
23 January 2016
19:00

Moldova	2–4	Russia
Spătaru 9'; Boiciuc 82'		Sutormin 11'; Mullin 67', 80'; Karpov 73'

Petersburg SCC, Saint Petersburg
Attendance: 3,000
Referee: Vasili Kazartsev (Russia)

== Final standing ==
Rank	Team
1st place, gold medalist(s)	Russia
2nd place, silver medalist(s)	Moldova
3rd place, bronze medalist(s)	Estonia
4	Kyrgyzstan
5	Belarus
6	Latvia
7	Kazakhstan
8	Tajikistan

== Top scorers ==
Rank	Player	Team	Goals
1	(Russia) Mikhail Zhabkin	Russia	3
2	(Russia) Kamil Mullin	Russia	2
2	(Moldova) Dan Spătaru	Moldova	2
2	(Estonia) Kevin Kauber	Estonia	2
2	(Estonia) Andre Järva	Estonia	2
2	(Kazakhstan) Abat Aimbetov	Kazakhstan	2
2	(Tajikistan) Nozim Babadjanov	Tajikistan	2
2	(Tajikistan) Jahongir Ergashev	Tajikistan	2
2	(Tajikistan) Parvizdzhon Umarbayev	Tajikistan	2
