= Commonwealth of Independent States Cup =

Football tournament

- CIS Cup logo.
- Organiser(s): Russian Football Union, FIFA
- Founded: 1993
- Abolished: 2016

The Commonwealth of Independent States Cup (Russian: Кубок чемпионов Содружества, Кубок Содружества, Кубок чемпионов содружества стран СНГ и Балтии) is a defunct annual regional association football tournament, recognized by FIFA.

The tournament was initially established for football clubs of the former Soviet Union republics in 1993 (a years after the collapse). On several occasions, some national football organizations of the former Soviet republics as well as individual clubs refused participation in the tournament for different reasons. Usually the invitation was sent to the best clubs of the Commonwealth of Independent States member states, as well as Estonia, Latvia, Lithuania, i.e. either a champion or a runner-up, while in the later editions the Cup (before 2012) saw participation of clubs from Serbia and Finland.

In 2012, the CIS Cup became a competition of national youth teams. Previously only the Russia under-21 team competed in the competition.

The competition was disestablished in 2016.

== History ==
The Commonwealth of Independent States Cup was planned to be the Champions' Cup of countries of CIS Commonwealth and Baltics. In July 1992 at a meeting of executive committee of the CIS Association of Football Federations adopted decision on launching the First Commonwealth of Independent States Cup since 1993 as an open tournament to champions from the USSR successor states (The Commonwealth of Independent States, and well as Estonia, Latvia and Lithuania).

Until 1996 Ukraine officially boycotted the competition, but in 1995 FC Shakhtar Donetsk on own initiative broke the boycott.

In 1995–2006 the Russia national under-21 football team participated in the tournament as the 16th team, but in 2007 and 2008 Serbia replaced it as the 17th nation sending a team to play in it, and became the first non-former Soviet Union nation participating in the tournament. Unlike the rest of the states, who send their latest champions to play in the tournament, Serbia has sent OFK Beograd to play in the tournament.

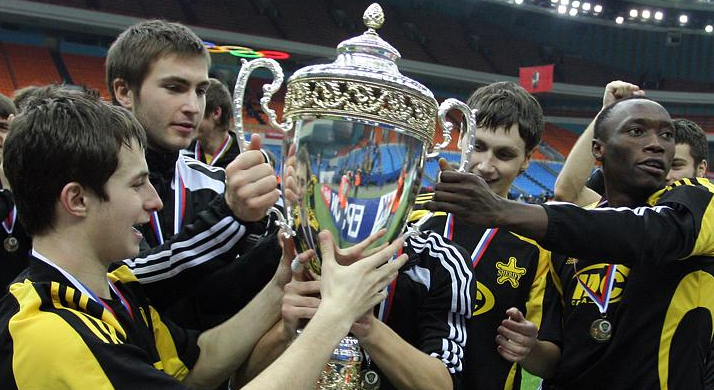
Sheriff Tiraspol with the 2009 CIS Cup title.

In its first years the tournament was popular in the territories of the former Soviet Union, including the most titled teams from the old Soviet Top League. Spartak Moscow from Russia, and Dynamo Kyiv from Ukraine each won the cup several times but, after less than a decade, the teams from Russia and Ukraine became hesitant to send their best players to play on the artificial turf at the Olympic Stadium, so they sent their reserve players instead or sometimes the league runners-up participated in their place. This resulted in the decrease of the tournament's popularity in those states particularly and in the international value of the tournament overall.

In 2006 a new tournament, Channel One Cup, started and caught the attention of the Russian and Ukrainian teams, which even more decreased the popularity of the Commonwealth of Independent States Cup tournament.

A big scandal occurred in 2006, when the Armenian champion FC Pyunik refused to play the Azerbaijani team, Neftçi PFK due to the lack of diplomatic relations between the two countries' governments at that time due to the Nagorno-Karabakh conflict. FC Pyunik defeated Ukrainian team FC Shakhtar Donetsk 3–1 in the quarter-final, earning a place in the semi-final against Neftçi. However, FC Pyunik announced that they would no play against an Azerbaijani team, and flew home from Moscow the same evening. The Russian Football Union gave FC Shakhtar Donetsk a technical victory 3–0 so they could play in the semi-final instead of FC Pyunik, but FC Shakhtar Donetsk declined the offer stating that "...we would really want to play in the semi-final, but we don't want to get there by any other way than sport". Eventually, Neftçi PFK were given a bye to the final, where they defeated the Lithuanian club FBK Kaunas 4–2.

In 2007 talks began about changing the format of the cup, and uniting it with the Channel One Cup in order to bring back the interest of the Russian and Ukrainian teams, and in 2007 its games were even visited by representatives from FIFA, but nevertheless, nothing came out from those talks and efforts.

In October 2009, Bunyodkor coach Luis Felipe Scolari announced that his Uzbek side would not enter the 2010 tournament due to focusing on the Asian Champions League.

== Finals ==
=== Competitions for U-21 national teams ===
Season	Winner	Score	Runner-up	Venue
2012	Russia	2 – 0	Belarus	SCC Peterburgsky, Saint Petersburg (Russia)
2013	Russia	4 – 2	Ukraine	SCC Peterburgsky, Saint Petersburg (Russia)
2014	Ukraine	4 – 0	Russia	SCC Peterburgsky, Saint Petersburg (Russia)
2015	South Africa	2 – 1	Finland	SCC Peterburgsky, Saint Petersburg (Russia)
2016	Russia	4 – 2	Moldova	SCC Peterburgsky, Saint Petersburg (Russia)

=== Club competitions ===
Season	Winner	Score	Runner-up	Venue
1993	(Russia) Spartak Moscow	8 – 0	Belarus Minsk	LFK CSKA, Moscow (Russia)
1994	(Russia) Spartak Moscow	7 – 0	(Uzbekistan) Neftchi Fergana	Olympic Stadium, Moscow (Russia)
1995	(Russia) Spartak Moscow	5 – 1	(Georgia (country)) Dinamo Tbilisi	LFK CSKA, Moscow (Russia)
1996	(Ukraine) Dynamo Kyiv	1 – 0	(Russia) Alania Vladikavkaz	LFK CSKA, Moscow (Russia)
1997	(Ukraine) Dynamo Kyiv	3 – 2	(Russia) Spartak Moscow	LFK CSKA, Moscow (Russia)
1998	(Ukraine) Dynamo Kyiv	1 – 0	(Russia) Spartak Moscow	LFK CSKA, Moscow (Russia)
1999	(Russia) Spartak Moscow	2 – 1	(Ukraine) Dynamo Kyiv	Olympic Stadium, Moscow (Russia)
2000	(Russia) Spartak Moscow	3 – 0	(Moldova) Zimbru Chişinău	Olympic Stadium, Moscow (Russia)
2001	(Russia) Spartak Moscow	2 – 1 aet	(Latvia) Skonto Riga	Olympic Stadium, Moscow (Russia)
2002	(Ukraine) Dynamo Kyiv	4 – 3	(Russia) Spartak Moscow	Olympic Stadium, Moscow (Russia)
2003	(Moldova) Sheriff Tiraspol	2 – 1	(Latvia) Skonto Riga	Olympic Stadium, Moscow (Russia)
2004	(Georgia (country)) Dinamo Tbilisi	3 – 1	(Latvia) Skonto Riga	Olympic Stadium, Moscow (Russia)
2005	(Russia) Lokomotiv Moscow	2 – 1	(Azerbaijan) Neftçi	Dynamo Manage, Moscow (Russia)
2006	(Azerbaijan) Neftçi	4 – 2	(Lithuania) FBK Kaunas	Olympic Stadium, Moscow (Russia)
2007	(Uzbekistan) Pakhtakor Tashkent	0 – 0; 9 – 8 on penalties	(Latvia) FK Ventspils	Olympic Stadium, Moscow (Russia)
2008	(Azerbaijan) Khazar Lenkoran	4 – 3	(Uzbekistan) Pakhtakor Tashkent	SCC Peterburgsky, Saint Petersburg (Russia)
2009	(Moldova) FC Sheriff Tiraspol	0 – 0; 5 – 4 on penalties	(Kazakhstan) FC Aktobe	Olympic Stadium, Moscow (Russia)
2010	(Russia) FK Rubin Kazan	5 – 2	(Kazakhstan) FC Aktobe	Olympic Stadium, Moscow (Russia)
2011	(Azerbaijan) Inter Baku	0 – 0; 6 – 5 on penalties	(Belarus) Shakhtyor Soligorsk	SCC Peterburgsky, Saint Petersburg (Russia)

== All-time top scorers ==
All-time top scorers in the Commonwealth of Independent States Cup
Rank	Player	Goals
1	Vladimir Beschastnykh (FC Spartak Moskva) (Russia)	20
2	Yegor Titov (FC Spartak Moskva) (Russia)	18
3	Valeri Kechinov (Pakhtakor Tashkent & FC Spartak Moskva) (Russia)	17
*	Mikhail Mikholap (FC Skonto Rīga) (Latvia)	17
5	Mikhail Kavelashvili (FC Dinamo Tbilisi & Spartak-Alania Vladikavkaz) (Georgia (country))	14
*	Luis Robson (FC Spartak Moskva) (Brazil)	14
7	Andrei Tikhonov (FC Spartak Moskva) (Russia)	13
8	Valentin Belkevich (FC Dinamo Minsk & FC Dynamo Kyiv) (Belarus)	12
*	Andriy Shevchenko (FC Dynamo Kyiv) (Ukraine)	12
10	Gela Inalishvili (FC Dinamo Tbilisi) (Georgia (country))	11
*	Anatoliy Kanischev (Spartak-Alania Vladikavkaz & FC Spartak Moskva) (Russia)	11
*	Mihails Zemļinskis (FC Skonto Rīga) (Latvia)	11

== Top scorers by year ==
Rank	Player	Goals
1993	Shota Arveladze (FC Dinamo Tbilisi) (Georgia (country))	5
1994	Vladimir Beschastnykh (FC Spartak Moskva) (Russia)	10
1995	Ilia Tsymbalar (FC Spartak Moskva) (Russia)	6
1996	Uladzimir Makowski (FC Dinamo Minsk) (Belarus)	5
1997	Andrey Tikhonov (Spartak Moscow) (Russia) , Andriy Shevchenko (Dynamo Kyiv) (Ukraine)	6
1998	Anatoliy Kanischev (Spartak Moscow) (Russia)	8
1999	Mihails Miholaps (Skonto Riga) (Latvia)	7
2000	Vladimirs Koļesņičenko (Skonto Riga) (Latvia) , Luis Robson (Spartak Moscow) (Brazil) , Yegor Titov (Spartak Moscow) (Russia)	5
2001	Mikheil Ashvetia (FC Torpedo Kutaisi) (Georgia (country)) , Jafar Irismetov (Spartak Moscow) (Uzbekistan) , Marcão (Spartak Moscow) (Brazil) , Valery Strypeykis (FC Slavia Mozyr) (Belarus) , Raman Vasilyuk (FC Slavia Mozyr) (Belarus)	4
2002	Vladimir Beschastnykh (Spartak Moscow) (Russia)	7
2003	Cristian Tudor (Sheriff Tiraspol) (Romania)	9
2004	Vitaly Daraselia Jr. (FC Dinamo Tbilisi) (Georgia (country))	6
2005	Giorgi Adamia (Neftchi Baku) (Georgia (country))	6
2006	Evhen Seleznyov (FC Shakhtar Donetsk) (Ukraine)	5
2007	Server Djeperov (FC Pakhtakor Tashkent) (Uzbekistan) , Vitali Rodionov (BATE Borisov) (Belarus)	4
2008	Uladzimir Yurchanka (Zenit Saint Petersburg) (Belarus)	4
2009	Ibrahim Rabimov (Regar-TadAZ Tursunzoda) (Tajikistan) , Vīts Rimkus (FK Ventspils) (Latvia) , Alexandr Erokhin (Sheriff Tiraspol) (Russia)	4
2010	Emil Kenzhesariev (FC Aktobe) (Kyrgyzstan)	6
2011	Ģirts Karlsons (FC Inter Baku) (Latvia)	6
2012	Sardar Azmoun (Iran U20)	8
2013	Andrei Panyukov (Russia U21)	6
2014	Roman Murtazaev (Kazakhstan U21), Ruslan Bolov (Russia U21), Abdurasul Rakhmonov (Tajikistan U21)	5
2015	Alexey Yevseyev (Russia U21)	5
2016	Mikhail Zhabkin (Russia U21)	3

== Performances by team ==
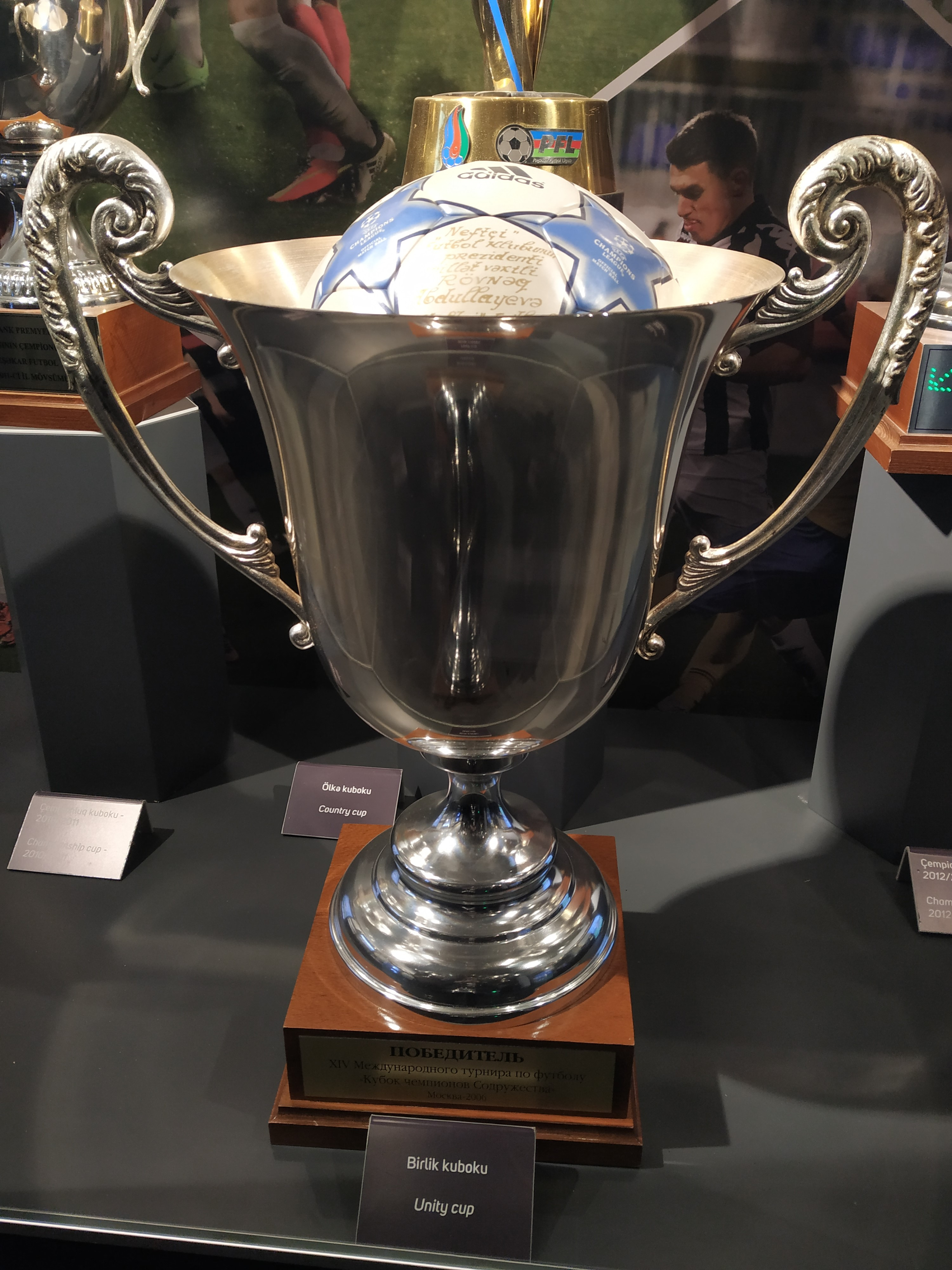
The trophy awarded to Neftçi PFK in 2006.

Team	Titles	Runners-up
(Russia) Spartak Moscow	6 (1993, 1994, 1995, 1999, 2000, 2001)	3 (1997, 1998, 2002)
(Ukraine) Dynamo Kyiv	4 (1996, 1997, 1998, 2002)	1 (1999)
Russia	3 (2012, 2013, 2016)	1 (2014)
(Moldova) Sheriff Tiraspol	2 (2003, 2009)	
Ukraine	1 (2014)	1 (2013)
(Georgia (country)) Dinamo Tbilisi	1 (2004)	1 (1995)
(Azerbaijan) Neftçi	1 (2006)	1 (2005)
(Uzbekistan) Pakhtakor Tashkent	1 (2007)	1 (2008)
South Africa	1 (2015)	
(Russia) Lokomotiv Moscow	1 (2005)	
(Azerbaijan) Khazar Lenkoran	1 (2008)	
(Russia) Rubin Kazan	1 (2010)	
(Azerbaijan) Inter Baku	1 (2011)	
(Latvia) Skonto Riga		3 (2001, 2003, 2004)
(Kazakhstan) Aktobe		2 (2009, 2010)
(Lithuania) FBK Kaunas		1 (2006)
Belarus Minsk		1 (1993)
(Uzbekistan) Neftchi Fergana		1 (1994)
(Russia) Alania Vladikavkaz		1 (1996)
(Moldova) Zimbru Chişinău		1 (2000)
(Latvia) FK Ventspils		1 (2007)
(Belarus) Shakhtyor Soligorsk		1 (2011)
Belarus		1 (2012)
Finland		1 (2015)
Moldova		1 (2016)

== Performances by country the clubs came from ==
Country	Titles	Runners-up
Russia	11	5
Ukraine	5	2
Azerbaijan	3	1
Moldova	2	2
Uzbekistan	1	2
(Georgia (country)) Georgia	1	1
South Africa	1	
Latvia		4
Belarus		3
Kazakhstan		2
Lithuania		1
Finland		1

== Records ==
- The biggest victory ever in the tournament took place in the 1998, when Spartak Moscow (Russia) beat Vakhsh Qurghonteppa (Tajikistan) 19–0.
- The player holding a record of appearances in the tournament is Mihails Zemļinskis from FC Skonto Riga who appeared 46 times in the tournament.
- The record for most titles won by a player is four and it is held by Oleksandr Holovko from Dynamo Kyiv and Dmitri Khlestov from Spartak Moscow.
- Three is the highest number for any team to consecutively win the cup: Spartak Moscow (Russia, twice. in 1993, 1994, 1995, and in 1999, 2000, 2001) and Dynamo Kyiv (Ukraine. 1996, 1997, 1998).

== See also ==
- United Tournament
- Channel One Cup
- Football at the Spartakiads of Peoples of the USSR
