= 1994 Commonwealth of Independent States Cup =

CIS Cup, Кубок Содружества 1994

Tournament details
- Host country: Russia
- Dates: 29 January – 4 February 1994
- Teams: 16
- Venue: 4 (in 1 host city)

Final positions
- Champions: (Russia) Spartak Moscow (2nd title)

Tournament statistics
- Matches played: 27
- Goals scored: 142 (5.26 per match)
- Top scorer(s): (Russia) Vladimir Beschastnykh (10 goals)

The 1994 Commonwealth of Independent States Cup was the second edition of the competition between the champions of former republics of Soviet Union. It was won by Spartak Moscow who defeated Uzbek side Neftchi Fergana in the final. As at the previous edition of the tournament, Ukraine opted not to send a team.

== Participants ==
Team	Qualification	Participation
(Russia) Spartak Moscow	1993 Russian Top League champions	2nd
(Belarus) Dinamo Minsk	1992–93 Belarusian Premier League champions	1st
(Lithuania) ROMAR Mažeikiai	1993–94 A Lyga 1st team as of the winter break	1st
(Latvia) Skonto Riga	1993 Latvian Higher League champions	2nd
(Estonia) Norma Tallinn	1992–93 Meistriliiga champions	2nd
(Moldova) Zimbru Chișinău	1992–93 Moldovan National Division champions	2nd
(Georgia (country)) Dinamo Tbilisi	1992–93 Umaglesi Liga champions	2nd
(Azerbaijan) Qarabağ Agdam	1993 Azerbaijan Top League champions	1st
(Armenia) Ararat Yerevan	1993 Armenian Premier League champions	1st
(Kazakhstan) Ansat Pavlodar	1993 Kazakhstan Premier League champions	1st
(Uzbekistan) Neftchi Fergana	1993 Uzbek League champions	1st
(Tajikistan) Sitora Dushanbe	1993 Tajik League champions	1st
(Kyrgyzstan) Alga-RIIF Bishkek	1993 Kyrgyzstan League champions	2nd
(Turkmenistan) Köpetdag Aşgabat	1993 Ýokary Liga champions	2nd
Russia U21 national team	Unofficial entry, not eligible to advance past group stage.^{1}	1st
(Russia) Dynamo Moscow	1993 Russian Top League 3rd placed team. Unofficial entry, not eligible to advance past group stage.	1st

^{1} (Ukraine) Dynamo Kyiv (1992–93 Ukrainian champions) refused to participate (citing unwillingness to play at the traumatic artificial pitch) and were replaced by unofficial participants Russia U21 national team.

== Group stage ==
=== Group A ===
Team	Pld	W	D	L	GF	GA	GD	Pts
(Russia) Spartak Moscow	3	3	0	0	16	1	+15	6
(Moldova) Zimbru Chișinău	3	1	1	1	3	4	−1	3
(Kazakhstan) Ansat Pavlodar	3	1	0	2	7	12	−5	2
(Estonia) Norma Tallinn	3	0	1	2	2	11	−9	1

==== Results ====
29 January 1994

Spartak Moscow (Russia)	3 – 0	(Estonia) Norma Tallinn
Onopko 51'; Teryokhin 54'; Lediakhov 67' (pen.)

CSKA Palace of Sports, Moscow
Attendance: 3,000
Referee: Vadim Zhuk (Belarus)
29 January 1994

Zimbru Chișinău (Moldova)	1 – 0	(Kazakhstan) Ansat Pavlodar
Miterev 55'

Spartak Manege, Moscow
Attendance: 50
Referee: Viktor Filippov (Russia)

30 January 1994

Spartak Moscow (Russia)	3 – 1	(Moldova) Zimbru Chișinău
Beschastnykh 3', 24'; Lediakhov 67' (pen.)		Testemițanu 76'

CSKA Palace of Sports, Moscow
Attendance: 4,000
Referee: Slavik Kazaryan (Armenia)
30 January 1994

Ansat Pavlodar (Kazakhstan)	7 – 1	(Estonia) Norma Tallinn
Konyukhov 10'; Duzmambetov 31'; Bush 40', 41'; Antonov 57', 74', 83'		Toštšev 67'

Spartak Manege, Moscow
Attendance: 100
Referee: Merab Malaguradze (Georgia)

31 January 1994

Ansat Pavlodar (Kazakhstan)	0 – 10	(Russia) Spartak Moscow
		Pisarev 7'; Tsymbalar 22'; Mamedov 31'; Beschastnykh 33', 39', 65'; Onopko 38'; Karpin 62', 79', 88'

CSKA Palace of Sports, Moscow
Attendance: 3,000
Referee: Rustam Ragimov (Azerbaijan)
31 January 1994

Norma Tallinn (Estonia)	1 – 1	(Moldova) Zimbru Chișinău
Pushtov 47'		Boreț 77'

Spartak Manege, Moscow
Attendance: 100
Referee: Valentin Ivanov (Russia)

=== Group B ===
- Unofficial table

Team	Pld	W	D	L	GF	GA	GD	Pts
(Russia) Dynamo Moscow	3	3	0	0	10	2	+8	6
(Turkmenistan) Köpetdag Aşgabat	3	2	0	1	8	5	+3	4
(Latvia) Skonto Riga	3	1	0	2	4	6	−2	2
(Armenia) Ararat Yerevan	3	0	0	3	3	12	−9	0

- Official table

Team	Pld	W	D	L	GF	GA	GD	Pts
(Turkmenistan) Köpetdag Aşgabat	2	2	0	0	6	2	+4	4
(Latvia) Skonto Riga	2	1	0	1	4	4	0	2
(Armenia) Ararat Yerevan	2	0	0	2	3	7	−4	0

==== Results ====
29 January 1994

Köpetdag Aşgabat (Turkmenistan)	2 – 3	(Russia) Dynamo Moscow
Nurmyradow 47' (pen.); K.Meredow 87'		I.Nekrasov 6'; Smertin 58'; Dobrovolski 76'

Dynamo Manage, Moscow
Attendance: 2,000
Referee: Z. Abdullayev (Uzbekistan)
29 January 1994

Ararat Yerevan (Armenia)	2 – 3	(Latvia) Skonto Riga
Sarkisyan 68' (pen.); Stepanyan 87'		Babičevs 23'; Semjonovs 47'; Sļesarčuks 86'

Spartak Manage, Moscow
Attendance: 300
Referee: Sergei Anokhin (Russia)

30 January 1994

Dynamo Moscow (Russia)	2 – 0	(Latvia) Skonto Riga
Smertin 23'; Smirnov 48' (pen.)

Dynamo Manage, Moscow
Attendance: 2,000
Referee: Rustam Ragimov (Azerbaijan)
30 January 1994

Ararat Yerevan (Armenia)	1 – 4	(Turkmenistan) Köpetdag Aşgabat
Gspeyan 22'		Korzh 20'; K.Meredow 41', 49'; Nurmyradow 47'

Spartak Manage, Moscow
Attendance: 150
Referee: Viktor Filippov (Russia)

31 January 1994

Dynamo Moscow (Russia)	5 – 0	(Armenia) Ararat Yerevan
Smirnov 60'; Dobrovolski 79'; Shalnev 84'; Samatov 85', 86'

Dynamo Manage, Moscow
Attendance: 2,000
Referee: Abduraim Babaev (Tajikistan)
31 January 1994

Skonto Riga (Latvia)	1 – 2	(Turkmenistan) Köpetdag Aşgabat
Tarasovs 24'		Kirillov 8'; D.Meredow 39'

Spartak Manage, Moscow
Attendance: 100
Referee: Sergei Khusainov (Russia)

=== Group C ===
Team	Pld	W	D	L	GF	GA	GD	Pts
(Georgia (country)) Dinamo Tbilisi	3	3	0	0	14	3	+11	6
(Azerbaijan) Qarabağ Agdam	3	2	0	1	6	4	+2	4
(Lithuania) ROMAR Mažeikiai	3	1	0	2	8	10	−2	2
(Tajikistan) Sitora Dushanbe	3	0	0	3	5	16	−11	0

==== Results ====
29 January 1994

Sitora Dushanbe (Tajikistan)	0 – 4	(Azerbaijan) Qarabağ Agdam
		M.Huseynov 14', 89'; M.Aliyev 35', 37'

Dynamo Manage, Moscow
Attendance: 400
Referee: Vladimir Ovchinnikov (Russia)
29 January 1994

Dinamo Tbilisi (Georgia (country))	5 – 1	(Lithuania) ROMAR Mažeikiai
Inalishvili 27' (pen.), 41', 71' (pen.); Kavelashvili 65', 69'		Gudaitis 79' (pen.)

Dynamo Manage, Moscow
Attendance: 2,500
Referee: Sergei Khusainov (Russia)

30 January 1994

Dinamo Tbilisi (Georgia (country))	6 – 2	(Tajikistan) Sitora Dushanbe
Kavelashvili 5'; Inalishvili 8', 35', 39', 52'; Iashvili 84'		Tolibov 55'; Bobokhanov 62' (pen.)

CSKA Palace of Sports, Moscow
Attendance: 3,200
Referee: Nikolay Obyedkov (Kazakhstan)
30 January 1994

Qarabağ Agdam (Azerbaijan)	2 – 1	(Lithuania) ROMAR Mažeikiai
Abushev 48'; M.Huseynov 62'		Pocius 42'

Spartak Manege, Moscow
Attendance: 200
Referee: Vladimir Direktorenko (Latvia)

31 January 1994

Qarabağ Agdam (Azerbaijan)	0 – 3	(Georgia (country)) Dinamo Tbilisi
		Tkebuchava 42'; Kavelashvili 47'; Inalishvili 89' (pen.)

Dynamo Manage, Moscow
Attendance: 3,000
Referee: Sergei Anokhin (Russia)
31 January 1994

Sitora Dushanbe (Tajikistan)	3 – 6	(Lithuania) ROMAR Mažeikiai
Bobokhanov 24'; Tukhtaev 42'; Igamberdyev 77'		Vaineikis 4'; Pocius 18', 23'; Dančenka 52'; Vilčiauskas 64'; Gudaitis 83'

Spartak Manege, Moscow
Attendance: 100
Referee: Yuri Vergopulo (Russia)

=== Group D ===
- Unofficial table

Team	Pld	W	D	L	GF	GA	GD	Pts
Russia U21	3	3	0	0	16	0	+16	6
(Uzbekistan) Neftchi Fergana	3	2	0	1	11	6	+5	4
(Belarus) Dinamo Minsk	3	1	0	2	11	6	+5	2
(Kyrgyzstan) Alga-RIIF Bishkek	3	0	0	3	0	26	−26	0

- Official table

Team	Pld	W	D	L	GF	GA	GD	Pts
(Uzbekistan) Neftchi Fergana	2	2	0	0	11	1	+10	4
(Belarus) Dinamo Minsk	2	1	0	1	11	5	+6	2
(Kyrgyzstan) Alga-RIIF Bishkek	2	0	0	2	0	16	−16	0

==== Results ====
29 January 1994

Neftchi Fergana (Uzbekistan)	6 – 0	(Kyrgyzstan) Alga-RIIF Bishkek
Bozorov 21', 48'; R.Durmonov 23'; Quttiboev 41', 66'; Miklyaev 47'

Spartak Manege, Moscow
Attendance: 100
Referee: Slavik Kazaryan (Armenia)
29 January 1994

Dinamo Minsk (Belarus)	0 – 1	Russia U21
		Karsakov 38'

CSKA Palace of Sports, Moscow
Attendance: 2,000
Referee: Binaretdin Sultanbayev (Kyrgyzstan)

30 January 1994

Dinamo Minsk (Belarus)	1 – 5	(Uzbekistan) Neftchi Fergana
Shukanov 8'		Fyodorov 13' (pen.), 67' (pen.); Bozorov 16', 36'; Zavalnyuk 26'

Dynamo Manage, Moscow
Attendance: 1,000
Referee: Vladimir Ovchinnikov (Russia)
30 January 1994

Alga-RIIF Bishkek (Kyrgyzstan)	0 – 10	Russia U21
		Talalayev 11' (pen.), 23', 26', 30' (pen.); Ayupov 12'; Simutenkov 55'; Fayzulin 65', 85'; Kulik 66'; Karsakov 73'

Dynamo Manage, Moscow
Attendance: 200
Referee: Konstantin Partsalis (Turkmenistan)

31 January 1994

Alga-RIIF Bishkek (Kyrgyzstan)	0 – 10	(Belarus) Dinamo Minsk
		Kachura 7', 22', 56'; Zhuravel 14'; Shukanov 26', 40' (pen.); Mayorov 57'; Charnyawski 65', 67'; Vostrykaw 67'

Dynamo Manage, Moscow
Attendance: 500
Referee: Vladimir Antonov (Moldova)
31 January 1994

Russia U21	5 – 0	(Uzbekistan) Neftchi Fergana
Grishin 7'; Fayzulin 10'; Kupriyanov 36'; Kulik 70'; Drozdov 80'

CSKA Palace of Sports, Moscow
Attendance: 500
Referee: A.Zakarlyuka (Estonia)

== Final rounds ==
Semi-finals (2 Feb)
(Russia)	Spartak Moscow	5
(Turkmenistan)	Köpetdag Aşgabat	1
(Georgia (country))	Dinamo Tbilisi	2
(Uzbekistan)	Neftchi Fergana	3

Final (4 Feb)
(Russia)	Spartak Moscow	7
(Uzbekistan)	Neftchi Fergana	0

=== Semi-finals ===
2 February 1994

Spartak Moscow (Russia)	5 – 1	(Turkmenistan) Köpetdag Aşgabat
Beschastnykh 38', 81'; Lediakhov 63'; Rodionov 69', 71'		Mingazow 82'

Olympic Sport Complex
Attendance: 6,000
Referee: Vadim Zhuk (Belarus)
2 February 1994

Dinamo Tbilisi (Georgia (country))	2 – 3	(Uzbekistan) Neftchi Fergana
Revishvili 10'; Inalishvili 31'		Fyodorov 45' (pen.); R.Durmonov 57'; Zavalnyuk 66'

Olympic Sport Complex
Attendance: 7,000
Referee: Viktor Filippov (Russia)

=== Final ===
4 February 1994

Spartak Moscow (Russia)	7 – 0	(Uzbekistan) Neftchi Fergana
Beschastnykh 16', 49', 75'; Lediakhov 41'; Ternavsky 62'; Alenichev 66'; Rodionov 77'

Olympic Sport Complex
Attendance: 12,000
Referee: Rustam Ragimov (Azerbaijan)

== Top scorers ==
Rank	Player	Team	Goals
1	(Russia) Vladimir Beschastnykh	(Russia) Spartak Moscow	10
2	(Georgia (country)) Gela Inalishvili	(Georgia (country)) Dinamo Tbilisi	9
3	(Russia) Igor Lediakhov	(Russia) Spartak Moscow	4
3	(Uzbekistan) Ravshan Bozorov	(Uzbekistan) Neftchi Fergana	4
3	(Georgia (country)) Mikheil Kavelashvili	(Georgia (country)) Dinamo Tbilisi	4
3	(Russia) Andrei Talalayev	Russia U21	4
