= 2005 Commonwealth of Independent States Cup =

CIS Cup, Кубок Содружества 2005

Tournament details
- Host country: Russia
- Dates: 15–23 January 2005
- Teams: 16
- Venues: 2 (in 1 host city)

Final positions
- Champions: (Russia) Lokomotiv Moscow (1st title)

Tournament statistics
- Matches played: 23
- Goals scored: 61 (2.65 per match)
- Top scorer(s): (Georgia (country)) Georgi Adamia (6 goals)

The 2005 Commonwealth of Independent States Cup was the thirteenth edition of the competition between the champions of former republics of Soviet Union. It was won by Lokomotiv Moscow for the first time.

== Format ==
This edition of the tournament featured a unique one-off format. In attempt to persuade Russian and Ukrainian champions to field their strongest squads, Lokomotiv Moscow and Dynamo Kyiv were given a straight bye to the Semifinal, avoiding Group phase and Quarterfinal. As a result, two of four groups featured only three clubs, and only four group winners advanced to the knock-out round. Ultimately, the change did not make desirable effect on Dynamo, who brought a reserve squad, and the format was reverted since next year.

== Participants ==
Team	Qualification	Participation
(Russia) Lokomotiv Moscow	2004 Russian Premier League champions	2nd
(Ukraine) Dynamo Kyiv	2003–04 Vyshcha Liha champions ^{1}	9th
(Belarus) Dinamo Minsk	2004 Belarusian Premier League champions	5th
(Lithuania) FBK Kaunas	2004 A Lyga champions	7th
(Latvia) Skonto Riga	2004 Latvian Higher League champions	13th
(Estonia) Levadia Tallinn	2004 Meistriliiga champions	3rd
(Moldova) Sheriff Tiraspol	2003–04 Moldovan National Division champions	4th
(Georgia (country)) Tbilisi	2003–04 Umaglesi Liga 4th team ^{2}	1st
(Armenia) Pyunik Yerevan	2004 Armenian Premier League champions	6th
(Azerbaijan) Neftchi Baku	2003–04 Azerbaijan Top League champions	4th
(Kazakhstan) Kairat Almaty	2004 Kazakhstan Premier League champions	2nd
(Uzbekistan) Pakhtakor Tashkent	2004 Uzbek League champions	4th
(Tajikistan) Regar-TadAZ Tursunzoda	2004 Tajik League champions	5th
(Turkmenistan) Nebitçi Balkanabat	2004 Ýokary Liga champions	1st
(Kyrgyzstan) Dordoi-Dynamo Naryn	2004 Kyrgyzstan League champions	1st
Russia U19	Unofficial entry, not eligible to advance past group stage	6th

- ^{1} Dynamo Kyiv were represented by Dynamo-2 players.
- ^{2} Tbilisi replaced WIT Georgia (2003–04 Georgian champions) and Dinamo Tbilisi (CIS Cup title holders), who declined to participate.

== Group stage ==
=== Group A ===
- Unofficial table

Team	Pld	W	D	L	GF	GA	GD	Pts
(Kazakhstan) Kairat Almaty	3	2	0	1	8	3	+5	6
(Estonia) Levadia Tallinn	3	1	1	1	1	4	−3	4
(Belarus) Dinamo Minsk	3	1	1	1	3	3	0	4
Russia U19	3	0	2	1	2	4	−2	2

- Official table

Team	Pld	W	D	L	GF	GA	GD	Pts
(Kazakhstan) Kairat Almaty	2	1	0	1	5	2	+3	3
(Belarus) Dinamo Minsk	2	1	0	1	2	2	0	3
(Estonia) Levadia Tallinn	2	1	0	1	1	4	−3	3

==== Results ====
15 January 2005
15:00

Levadia Tallinn (Estonia)	0 – 0	Russia U19

Spartak Manage, Moscow
Attendance: 350
Referee: Allabergen Sapaev (Turkmenistan)
15 January 2005
19:00

Dinamo Minsk (Belarus)	2 – 1	(Kazakhstan) Kairat Almaty
Valadzyankow 75'; Edu 87'		Dicu 51'

Dynamo Manage, Moscow
Attendance: 1,000
Referee: Yuri Baskakov (Russia)

16 January 2005
15:00

Kairat Almaty (Kazakhstan)	3 – 1	Russia U19
Lovchev 22'; Aksenov 38'; Buleshev 83'		Boyev 31'

Spartak Manage, Moscow
Attendance: 400
Referee: Ravshan Irmatov (Uzbekistan)
16 January 2005
17:00

Dinamo Minsk (Belarus)	0 – 1	(Estonia) Levadia Tallinn
		Dovydėnas 8'

Dynamo Manage, Moscow
Attendance: 300
Referee: Levan Paniashvili (Georgia)

18 January 2005
15:00

Dinamo Minsk (Belarus)	1 – 1	Russia U19
Razin 56'		Pavlov 71'

Spartak Manage, Moscow
Attendance: 250
Referee: Emil Busurmankulov (Kyrgyzstan)
18 January 2005
17:00

Levadia Tallinn (Estonia)	0 – 4	(Kazakhstan) Kairat Almaty
		Dicu 42', 51', 67'; Buleshev 71'

Dynamo Manage, Moscow
Attendance: 200
Referee: Levan Paniashvili (Georgia)

=== Group B ===
Team	Pld	W	D	L	GF	GA	GD	Pts
(Lithuania) FBK Kaunas	3	3	0	0	4	1	+3	9
(Georgia (country)) Tbilisi	3	1	1	1	3	3	0	4
(Uzbekistan) Pakhtakor Tashkent	3	1	0	2	1	2	−1	3
(Kyrgyzstan) Dordoi-Dynamo Naryn	3	0	1	2	3	5	−2	1

==== Results ====
15 January 2005
17:00

Tbilisi (Georgia (country))	1 – 0	(Uzbekistan) Pakhtakor Tashkent
Getsadze 45'

Dynamo Manage, Moscow
Attendance: 600
Referee: Stanislav Sukhina (Russia)
15 January 2005
19:00

Dordoi-Dynamo Naryn (Kyrgyzstan)	1 – 2	(Lithuania) FBK Kaunas
Zhumagulov 49' (pen.)		Sydykov 49' (o.g.); Beniušis 72'

Spartak Manage, Moscow
Attendance: 200
Referee: Oleg Chikun (Belarus)

16 January 2005
19:00

FBK Kaunas (Lithuania)	1 – 0	(Georgia (country)) Tbilisi
Rimkevičius 76'

Dynamo Manage, Moscow
Attendance: 300
Referee: Akmalkhan Kholmatov (Kazakhstan)
16 January 2005
19:00

Pakhtakor Tashkent (Uzbekistan)	1 – 0	(Kyrgyzstan) Dordoi-Dynamo Naryn
Ismailov 49'

Spartak Manage, Moscow
Attendance: 200
Referee: Zohrab Gadiyev (Azerbaijan)

18 January 2005
19:00

FBK Kaunas (Lithuania)	1 – 0	(Uzbekistan) Pakhtakor Tashkent
Kšanavičius 37'

Dynamo Manage, Moscow
Attendance: 300
Referee: Romāns Lajuks (Latvia)
18 January 2005
19:00

Dordoi-Dynamo Naryn (Kyrgyzstan)	2 – 2	(Georgia (country)) Tbilisi
Zhumagulov 49' (pen.), 71'		Iashvili 8'; Mikadze 12'

Spartak Manage, Moscow
Attendance: 150
Referee: Vitaliy Hodulyan (Ukraine)

=== Group C ===
Team	Pld	W	D	L	GF	GA	GD	Pts
(Armenia) Pyunik Yerevan	2	1	1	0	7	3	+4	4
(Latvia) Skonto Riga	2	1	1	0	6	3	+3	4
(Tajikistan) Regar-TadAZ Tursunzoda	2	0	0	2	2	9	−7	0

==== Results ====
15 January 2005
17:00

Skonto Riga (Latvia)	4 – 1	(Tajikistan) Regar-TadAZ Tursunzoda
Miholaps 7', 8'; Višņakovs 59'; Buitkus 82'		Khamidov 18'

Spartak Manage, Moscow
Attendance: 200
Referee: Ghenadie Orlic (Moldova)

16 January 2005
17:00

Pyunik Yerevan (Armenia)	5 – 1	(Tajikistan) Regar-TadAZ Tursunzoda
V.Aleksanyan 23', 32'; A.Petrosyan 56'; Diawara 57'; Tadevosyan 85'		Choriyev 51'

Spartak Manage, Moscow
Attendance: 700
Referee: Margus Kotter (Estonia)

18 January 2005
15:00

Skonto Riga (Latvia)	2 – 2	(Armenia) Pyunik Yerevan
Zemļinskis 44'; Buitkus 61'		A.Petrosyan 43'; Diawara 45'

Dynamo Manage, Moscow
Attendance: 500
Referee: Nikolai Ivanov (Russia)

=== Group D ===
Team	Pld	W	D	L	GF	GA	GD	Pts
(Azerbaijan) Neftchi Baku	2	2	0	0	5	1	+4	6
(Moldova) Sheriff Tiraspol	2	1	0	1	5	1	+4	3
(Turkmenistan) Nebitçi Balkanabat	2	0	0	2	1	9	−8	0

==== Results ====
15 January 2005
15:00

Sheriff Tiraspol (Moldova)	0 – 1	(Azerbaijan) Neftchi Baku
		Adamia 61'

Dynamo Manage, Moscow
Attendance: 400
Referee: Vitaliy Hodulyan (Ukraine)

16 January 2005
15:00

Neftchi Baku (Azerbaijan)	4 – 1	(Turkmenistan) Nebitçi Balkanabat
Adamia 32', 57'; Tagizade 39'; Nikiema 89'		Sudarev 47'

Dynamo Manage, Moscow
Attendance: 400
Referee: Audrius Žuta (Lithuania)

18 January 2005
17:00

Nebitçi Balkanabat (Turkmenistan)	0 – 5	(Moldova) Sheriff Tiraspol
		Lima 2'; Florescu 47'; Cociș 74'; Burnadze 80'; Tassembedo 90+2'

Spartak Manage, Moscow
Attendance: 150
Referee: Kiyomiddin Safarov (Tajikistan)

== Final rounds ==
Quarterfinals (19 Jan)
(Kazakhstan)	Kairat Almaty	0
(Lithuania)	FBK Kaunas (p)	0
(Armenia)	Pyunik Yerevan	0
(Azerbaijan)	Neftchi Baku	2

Semifinals (21 Jan)
(Lithuania)	FBK Kaunas	0
(Russia)	Lokomotiv Moscow	2
(Azerbaijan)	Neftchi Baku	2
(Ukraine)	Dynamo Kyiv	1

Final (23 Jan)
(Russia)	Lokomotiv Moscow	2
(Azerbaijan)	Neftchi Baku	1

=== Quarterfinals ===
19 January 2005
16:00

Kairat Almaty (Kazakhstan)	0 – 0	(Lithuania) FBK Kaunas
Penalties
Lovchev (penalty missed); Aliyev (penalty missed); Abdulin (penalty missed); Utabayev (penalty scored); Dicu (penalty scored)	2 – 3	(penalty scored) Bezykornovas; (penalty missed) Regelskis; (penalty missed) Almeida; (penalty scored) Rimkevičius; (penalty scored) Puotkalis

Dynamo Manage, Moscow
Attendance: 500
Referee: Nikolai Ivanov (Russia)
19 January 2005
19:00

Pyunik Yerevan (Armenia)	0 – 2	(Azerbaijan) Neftchi Baku
		Adamia 66'; Rzayev 68'

Dynamo Manage, Moscow
Attendance: 1,200
Referee: Yuri Baskakov (Russia)

=== Semifinals ===
21 January 2005
16:00

Neftchi Baku (Azerbaijan)	2 – 1	(Ukraine) Dynamo Kyiv
Adamia 6', 65'		Dopilka 49'

Dynamo Manage, Moscow
Attendance: 1,300
Referee: Levan Paniashvili (Georgia)
21 January 2005
19:00

FBK Kaunas (Lithuania)	0 – 2	(Russia) Lokomotiv Moscow
		Asatiani 54'; Sychev 71'

Dynamo Manage, Moscow
Attendance: 1,200
Referee: Karen Nalbandyan (Armenia)

=== Finals ===
23 January 2005
13:00

Lokomotiv Moscow (Russia)	2 – 1	(Azerbaijan) Neftchi Baku
Loskov 35'; Amelyanchuk 77'		Tagizade 14'

Dynamo Manage, Moscow
Attendance: 1,200
Referee: Romāns Lajuks (Latvia)

== Top scorers ==
Rank	Player	Team	Goals
1	(Georgia (country)) Georgi Adamia	(Azerbaijan) Neftchi Baku	6
2	(Romania) Cristian Dicu	(Kazakhstan) Kairat Almaty	4
3	(Kyrgyzstan) Zamirbek Zhumagulov	(Kyrgyzstan) Dordoi-Dynamo Naryn	3
