= 1996 Commonwealth of Independent States Cup =

CIS Cup, Кубок Содружества 1996

Tournament details
- Host country: Russia
- Dates: 26 January – 3 February 1996
- Teams: 16
- Venue: 3 (in 1 host city)

Final positions
- Champions: (Ukraine) Dynamo Kyiv (1st title)

Tournament statistics
- Matches played: 31
- Goals scored: 118 (3.81 per match)
- Top scorer(s): (Belarus) Uladzimir Makowski (5 goals)

The 1996 Commonwealth of Independent States Cup was the fourth edition of the competition between the champions of former republics of Soviet Union. It was won by Dynamo Kyiv in their first participation in the competition, while Omari Tetradze (Alania Vladikavkaz) was honored as the Best player award. In a change from the previous years, top two teams of each group progressed through the first stage, and a quarterfinal round was played for the first time.

== Participants ==
Team	Qualification	Participation
(Russia) Spartak-Alania Vladikavkaz	1995 Russian Top League champions	1st
(Ukraine) Dynamo Kyiv	1994–95 Vyshcha Liha champions	1st
(Belarus) Dinamo Minsk	1995 Belarusian Premier League champions	3rd
(Lithuania) Žalgiris Vilnius	1995–96 A Lyga 1st team as of the winter break	2nd
(Latvia) Skonto Riga	1995 Latvian Higher League champions	4th
(Estonia) Flora Tallinn	1994–95 Meistriliiga champions	2nd
(Moldova) Zimbru Chișinău	1994–95 Moldovan National Division champions	4th
(Georgia (country)) Dinamo Tbilisi	1994–95 Umaglesi Liga champions	4th
(Azerbaijan) Kapaz Ganja	1994–95 Azerbaijan Top League champions	1st
(Armenia) Pyunik Yerevan	1995–96 Armenian Premier League 1st team as of the winter break	1st
(Kazakhstan) Yelimay Semipalatinsk	1995 Kazakhstan Premier League champions	2nd
(Uzbekistan) Neftchi Fergana	1995 Uzbek League champions	2nd
(Tajikistan) Pamir Dushanbe	1995 Tajik League champions	1st
(Kyrgyzstan) Kant-Oil-Semetey	1995 Kyrgyzstan League champions	2nd
(Turkmenistan) Köpetdag Aşgabat	1995 Ýokary Liga champions	4th
Russia U21 national team	Unofficial entry, not eligible to advance past group stage.	3rd

== Group stage ==
=== Group A ===
- Unofficial table

Team	Pld	W	D	L	GF	GA	GD	Pts
(Latvia) Skonto Riga	3	3	0	0	7	4	+3	9
Russia U21	3	2	0	1	7	4	+3	6
(Uzbekistan) Neftchi Fergana	3	1	0	2	4	5	−1	3
(Moldova) Zimbru Chișinău	3	0	0	3	2	7	−5	0

- Official table

Team	Pld	W	D	L	GF	GA	GD	Pts
(Latvia) Skonto Riga	2	2	0	0	4	2	+2	6
(Uzbekistan) Neftchi Fergana	2	1	0	1	3	3	0	3
(Moldova) Zimbru Chișinău	2	0	0	2	2	4	−2	0

==== Results ====
26 January 1996
13:00

Zimbru Chișinău (Moldova)	1 – 2	(Uzbekistan) Neftchi Fergana
Spânu 38'		Andreyev 78', 87'

Dynamo Manage, Moscow
Attendance: 300
Referee: Algirdas Dubinskas (Lithuania)
26 January 1996
15:00

Skonto Riga (Latvia)	3 – 2	Russia U21
Babičevs 37'; Zemļinskis 50' (pen.); Baushev 68'		Krivov 70'; Movsisyan 77'

Dynamo Manage, Moscow
Attendance: 300
Referee: Khagani Mamedov (Azerbaijan)

27 January 1996
13:00

Russia U21	2 – 1	(Uzbekistan) Neftchi Fergana
Khokhlov 25', 39'		Pisarev 85'

Dynamo Manage, Moscow
Attendance: 500
Referee: Oleg Timofejev (Estonia)
27 January 1996
16:00

Skonto Riga (Latvia)	2 – 1	(Moldova) Zimbru Chișinău
Zemļinskis 59'; Štolcers 72'		Rebeja 41'

CSKA Palace of Sports, Moscow
Attendance: 1,000
Referee: Serhiy Tatulian (Ukraine)

29 January 1996
13:00

Zimbru Chișinău (Moldova)	0 – 3	Russia U21
		Semak 7'; Sikoyev 27'; Davydov 61'

Spartak Manege, Moscow
Attendance: 200
Referee: Kadyrbek Chynybekov (Kyrgyzstan)
29 January 1996
18:00

Neftchi Fergana (Uzbekistan)	1 – 2	(Latvia) Skonto Riga
Ni 35' (pen.)		Astafjevs 55'; Štolcers 65'

Spartak Manege, Moscow
Attendance: 250
Referee: Valentin Ivanov (Russia)

=== Group B ===
Team	Pld	W	D	L	GF	GA	GD	Pts
(Russia) Spartak-Alania Vladikavkaz	3	3	0	0	13	0	+13	9
(Kazakhstan) Yelimay Semipalatinsk	3	2	0	1	7	4	+3	6
(Armenia) Pyunik Yerevan	3	0	1	2	1	8	−7	1
(Kyrgyzstan) Kant-Oil-Semetey	3	0	1	2	1	10	−9	1

==== Results ====
26 January 1996
13:00

Pyunik Yerevan (Armenia)	0 – 3	(Kazakhstan) Yelimay Semipalatinsk
		Miroshnichenko 7'; Kainazarov 29'; Litvinenko 47'

Spartak Manege, Moscow
Attendance: 300
Referee: Lom-Ali Ibragimov (Russia)
26 January 1996
18:00

Spartak-Alania Vladikavkaz (Russia)	5 – 0	(Kyrgyzstan) Kant-Oil-Semetey
Tedeyev 11'; Qosimov 19'; Revishvili 39'; Kavelashvili 49'; Suleymanov 76' (pen.)

CSKA Palace of Sports, Moscow
Attendance: 2,000
Referee: Romāns Lajuks (Latvia)

27 January 1996
13:00

Kant-Oil-Semetey (Kyrgyzstan)	0 – 4	(Kazakhstan) Yelimay Semipalatinsk
		Litvinenko 19', 39'; Kainazarov 53'; Fridental 68'

Spartak Manege, Moscow
Attendance: 2,200
Referee: Viktor Filippov (Russia)
27 January 1996
18:00

Spartak-Alania Vladikavkaz (Russia)	4 – 0	(Armenia) Pyunik Yerevan
Qosimov 11'; Suleymanov 12'; Yanovsky 15'; Gevorgyan 50' (o.g.)

CSKA Palace of Sports, Moscow
Attendance: 350
Referee: Vadim Zhuk (Belarus)

29 January 1996
15:00

Pyunik Yerevan (Armenia)	1 – 1	(Kyrgyzstan) Kant-Oil-Semetey
Khachatryan 7'		Mirshanov 77'

Dynamo Manage, Moscow
Attendance: 350
Referee: Oleg Timofejev (Estonia)
29 January 1996
18:00

Yelimay Semipalatinsk (Kazakhstan)	0 – 4	(Russia) Spartak-Alania Vladikavkaz
		Revishvili 12'; Yanovsky 27', 86'; Kavelashvili 50'

CSKA Palace of Sports, Moscow
Attendance: 3,000
Referee: Allabergen Sapaev (Turkmenistan)

=== Group C ===
Team	Pld	W	D	L	GF	GA	GD	Pts
(Belarus) Dinamo Minsk	3	3	0	0	10	5	+5	9
(Ukraine) Dynamo Kyiv	3	2	0	1	6	3	+3	6
(Turkmenistan) Köpetdag Aşgabat	3	1	0	2	7	8	−1	3
(Estonia) Flora Tallinn	3	0	0	3	1	8	−7	0

==== Results ====
26 January 1996
15:00

Köpetdag Aşgabat (Turkmenistan)	3 – 5	(Belarus) Dinamo Minsk
Seydiev 38' (pen.); Plyuşçenko 61'; Hamibi 84'		Byalkevich 3', 89'; M.Makowski 29'; Khatskevich 42'; U.Makowski 48'

Spartak Manege, Moscow
Attendance: 300
Referee: Aleksandr Borisov (Kazakhstan)
26 January 1996
16:00

Dynamo Kyiv (Ukraine)	2 – 0	(Estonia) Flora Tallinn
Leonenko 21'; Shkapenko 74'

CSKA Palace of Sports, Moscow
Attendance: 2,500
Referee: Vladimir Ovchinnikov (Russia)

27 January 1996
15:00

Dynamo Kyiv (Ukraine)	2 – 0	(Turkmenistan) Köpetdag Aşgabat
Holovko 57'; Shmatovalenko 61'

Dynamo Manage, Moscow
Attendance: 2,000
Referee: Sergei Anokhin (Russia)
27 January 1996
17:00

Flora Tallinn (Estonia)	0 – 2	(Belarus) Dinamo Minsk
		U.Makowski 24'; Kachura 49'

Spartak Manege, Moscow
Attendance: 350
Referee: Slavik Kazaryan (Armenia)

29 January 1996
13:00

Köpetdag Aşgabat (Turkmenistan)	4 – 1	(Estonia) Flora Tallinn
Agaýew 25', 66'; Mohhamadi 29'; A.Meredow 61'		Krõm 41'

Dynamo Manage, Moscow
Attendance: 150
Referee: A.Alimov (Tajikistan)
29 January 1996
17:00

Dinamo Minsk (Belarus)	3 – 2	(Ukraine) Dynamo Kyiv
U.Makowski 43', 90'; Mayorov 88'		Kosovskyi 44'; Shevchenko 74'

Dynamo Manage, Moscow
Attendance: 2,000
Referee: Andrei Butenko (Russia)

=== Group D ===
Team	Pld	W	D	L	GF	GA	GD	Pts
(Lithuania) Žalgiris Vilnius	3	2	0	1	8	4	+4	6
(Georgia (country)) Dinamo Tbilisi	3	2	0	1	13	3	+10	6
(Tajikistan) Pamir Dushanbe	3	1	0	2	5	16	−11	3
(Azerbaijan) Kapaz Ganja	3	1	0	2	3	6	−3	3

- Note: primary tie-breaker is head-to-head result.

==== Results ====
26 January 1996
17:00

Dinamo Tbilisi (Georgia (country))	9 – 0	(Tajikistan) Pamir Dushanbe
Anchabadze 21'; Gogichaishvili 29' (pen.), 39', 50'; Kobiashvili 38'; Shaimov 73' (o.g.); Mujiri 78'; Khomeriki 79'; Iashvili 89'

Dynamo Manage, Moscow
Attendance: 1,300
Referee: Andrei Butenko (Russia)
26 January 1996
17:00

Žalgiris Vilnius (Lithuania)	0 – 1	(Azerbaijan) Kapaz Ganja
		A.Mammadov 35'

Spartak Manege, Moscow
Attendance: 500
Referee: Merab Malaguradze (Georgia)

27 January 1996
15:00

Pamir Dushanbe (Tajikistan)	3 – 2	(Azerbaijan) Kapaz Ganja
Kamaletdinov 7'; Zardov 31'; Kh.Fuzailov 73'		Allahverdiyev 45'; R.Ahmadov 51'

Spartak Manege, Moscow
Attendance: 400
Referee: Nail Lutfullin (Uzbekistan)
27 January 1996
17:00

Dinamo Tbilisi (Georgia (country))	1 – 3	(Lithuania) Žalgiris Vilnius
Demetradze 73'		Jankauskas 48', 57'; Pukelevičius 83'

Dynamo Manage, Moscow
Attendance: 2,800
Referee: Valentin Ivanov (Russia)

29 January 1996
15:00

Žalgiris Vilnius (Lithuania)	5 – 2	(Tajikistan) Pamir Dushanbe
Rimkus 3', 32', 45'; Tereškinas 52'; A.Steško 71'		Jabborov 5'; Knyazev 87'

Spartak Manege, Moscow
Attendance: 100
Referee: Vladimir Ovchinnikov (Russia)
29 January 1996
16:00

Kapaz Ganja (Azerbaijan)	0 – 3	(Georgia (country)) Dinamo Tbilisi
		Iashvili 10'; Kerdzevadze 76'; Gogichaishvili 83'

CSKA Palace of Sports, Moscow
Attendance: 2,500
Referee: Sergei Khusainov (Russia)

== Final rounds ==
Quarter-finals (30 Jan)
(Latvia)	Skonto Riga	1
(Kazakhstan)	Yelimay Semipalatinsk	0
(Russia)	Spartak-Alania Vladikavkaz	9
(Uzbekistan)	Neftchi Fergana	0
(Lithuania)	Žalgiris Vilnius	0
(Ukraine)	Dynamo Kyiv	3
(Belarus)	Dinamo Minsk	2
(Georgia (country))	Dinamo Tbilisi	1

Semi-finals (1 Feb)
(Latvia)	Skonto Riga	0
(Russia)	Spartak-Alania Vladikavkaz	2
(Ukraine)	Dynamo Kyiv	4
(Belarus)	Dinamo Minsk	0

Final (3 Feb)
(Russia)	Spartak-Alania Vladikavkaz	0
(Ukraine)	Dynamo Kyiv	1

=== Quarter-finals ===
30 January 1996
14:30

Dinamo Minsk (Belarus)	2 – 1	(Georgia (country)) Dinamo Tbilisi
U.Makowski 75'; Byalkevich 34'		Tskitishvili 75'

Dynamo Manage, Moscow
Attendance: 2,500
Referee: Viktor Filippov (Russia)
30 January 1996
15:30

Skonto Riga (Latvia)	1 – 0	(Kazakhstan) Yelimay Semipalatinsk
Baushev 79'

CSKA Palace of Sports, Moscow
Attendance: 500
Referee: Serhiy Tatulian (Ukraine)
30 January 1996
17:00

Žalgiris Vilnius (Lithuania)	0 – 3	(Ukraine) Dynamo Kyiv
		Pokhlebayev 53', 69' (pen.), 90' (pen.)

Dynamo Manage, Moscow
Attendance: 2,000
Referee: Sergei Khusainov (Russia)
30 January 1996
18:00

Spartak-Alania Vladikavkaz (Russia)	9 – 0	(Uzbekistan) Neftchi Fergana
Revishvili 9'; Derkach 21'; Suleymanov 25', 36'; Kanishchev 47', 86'; Kavelashvili 64'; Tetradze 67'; Tedeyev 75'

CSKA Palace of Sports, Moscow
Attendance: 2,000
Referee: Slavik Kazaryan (Armenia)

=== Semi-finals ===
1 February 1996
15:30

Dynamo Kyiv (Ukraine)	4 – 0	(Belarus) Dinamo Minsk
Mykhaylenko 31'; Leonenko 41'; Pokhlebayev 57'; Shevchenko 59'

CSKA Palace of Sports, Moscow
Attendance: 3,900
Referee: Sergei Anokhin (Russia)
1 February 1996
18:00

Skonto Riga (Latvia)	0 – 2	(Russia) Spartak-Alania Vladikavkaz
		Qosimov 58'; Derkach 89'

CSKA Palace of Sports, Moscow
Attendance: 4,000
Referee: Vadim Zhuk (Belarus)

=== Final ===
3 February 1996
16:00

Spartak-Alania Vladikavkaz (Russia)	0 – 1	(Ukraine) Dynamo Kyiv
		Shevchenko 81'

CSKA Palace of Sports, Moscow
Attendance: 4,500
Referee: Vadim Zhuk (Belarus)

== Top scorers ==
Rank	Player	Team	Goals
1	(Belarus) Uladzimir Makowski	(Belarus) Dinamo Minsk	5
2	(Ukraine) Yevhen Pokhlebayev	(Ukraine) Dynamo Kyiv	4
2	(Azerbaijan) Nazim Suleymanov	(Russia) Spartak-Alania Vladikavkaz	4
2	(Georgia (country)) Kakhaber Gogichaishvili	(Georgia (country)) Dinamo Tbilisi	4
