= 2004 Commonwealth of Independent States Cup =

CIS Cup, Кубок Содружества 2004

Tournament details
- Host country: Russia
- Dates: 17–25 January 2004
- Teams: 16
- Venues: 2 (in 1 host city)

Final positions
- Champions: (Georgia (country)) Dinamo Tbilisi (1st title)

Tournament statistics
- Matches played: 31
- Goals scored: 93 (3 per match)
- Top scorer(s): (Georgia (country)) Vitaly Daraselia (6 goals)

The 2004 Commonwealth of Independent States Cup was the twelfth edition of the competition between the champions of former republics of Soviet Union. It was won by Dinamo Tbilisi for the first time.

== Participants ==
| Team | Qualification | Participation |
|---|---|---|
| (Russia) CSKA Moscow | 2003 Russian Premier League champions ^{1} | 1st |
| (Ukraine) Dynamo Kyiv | 2002–03 Vyshcha Liha champions ^{2} | 8th |
| (Belarus) Gomel | 2003 Belarusian Premier League champions | 1st |
| (Lithuania) FBK Kaunas | 2003 A Lyga champions | 6th |
| (Latvia) Skonto Riga | 2003 Latvian Higher League champions | 12th |
| (Estonia) Flora Tallinn | 2003 Meistriliiga champions | 5th |
| (Moldova) Sheriff Tiraspol | 2002–03 Moldovan National Division champions | 3rd |
| (Georgia (country)) Dinamo Tbilisi | 2002–03 Umaglesi Liga champions | 9th |
| (Armenia) Pyunik Yerevan | 2003 Armenian Premier League champions | 5th |
| (Azerbaijan) Qarabağ-Azersun | 2003–04 Azerbaijan Top League 1st team after first half of the season | 2nd |
| (Kazakhstan) Irtysh Pavlodar | 2003 Kazakhstan Premier League champions | 5th |
| (Uzbekistan) Pakhtakor Tashkent | 2003 Uzbek League champions | 3rd |
| (Tajikistan) Regar-TadAZ Tursunzoda | 2003 Tajik League champions | 4th |
| (Turkmenistan) Nisa Aşgabat | 2003 Ýokary Liga champions | 3rd |
| (Kyrgyzstan) Zhashtyk-Ak-Altyn Kara-Suu | 2003 Kyrgyzstan League champions | 2nd |
| Russia U19 | Unofficial entry, not eligible to advance past group stage | 5th |

- ^{1} CSKA Moscow were represented by reserve/youth players.
- ^{2} Dynamo Kyiv were represented by a mix of Dynamo-2 and main team players.

== Group stage ==
=== Group A ===
| Team | Pld | W | D | L | GF | GA | GD | Pts |
|---|---|---|---|---|---|---|---|---|
| (Russia) CSKA Moscow | 3 | 2 | 1 | 0 | 6 | 4 | +2 | 7 |
| (Belarus) Gomel | 3 | 1 | 2 | 0 | 6 | 5 | +1 | 5 |
| (Uzbekistan) Pakhtakor Tashkent | 3 | 1 | 1 | 1 | 4 | 4 | 0 | 4 |
| (Tajikistan) Regar-TadAZ Tursunzoda | 3 | 0 | 0 | 3 | 2 | 5 | −3 | 0 |

==== Results ====
17 January 2004
19:00

| CSKA Moscow (Russia) | 2 – 2 | (Belarus) Gomel |
|---|---|---|
| Rodin 3'; Mazalov 13' | | Bliznyuk 12'; Lukashenko 43' |

Olympic Sport Complex, Moscow
Attendance: 2,000
Referee: Vitaliy Hodulyan (Ukraine)
17 January 2004
19:00

| Regar-TadAZ Tursunzoda (Tajikistan) | 0 – 1 | (Uzbekistan) Pakhtakor Tashkent |
|---|---|---|
| | | Bikmaev 70' |

Spartak Manege, Moscow
Attendance: 500
Referee: Raivo Lattik (Estonia)

18 January 2004
19:00

| Pakhtakor Tashkent (Uzbekistan) | 1 – 2 | (Russia) CSKA Moscow |
|---|---|---|
| Z.Tadjiyev 17' | | Yanovsky 31'; Samodin 85' |

Olympic Sport Complex, Moscow
Attendance: 1,800
Referee: Karen Nalbandyan (Armenia)
18 January 2004
19:00

| Gomel (Belarus) | 2 – 1 | (Tajikistan) Regar-TadAZ Tursunzoda |
|---|---|---|
| Suchkow 75'; Shahoyka 89' | | Irgashev 30' |

Spartak Manege, Moscow
Attendance: 500
Referee: Veaceslav Banari (Moldova)

20 January 2004
19:00

| CSKA Moscow (Russia) | 2 – 1 | (Tajikistan) Regar-TadAZ Tursunzoda |
|---|---|---|
| Mazalov 48'; Samodin 58' (pen.) | | Khamidov 86' (pen.) |

Olympic Sport Complex, Moscow
Attendance: 800
Referee: Paulius Malžinskas (Lithuania)
20 January 2004
19:00

| Gomel (Belarus) | 2 – 2 | (Uzbekistan) Pakhtakor Tashkent |
|---|---|---|
| Usaw 21'; Zabolotsky 75' | | Magdeev 54'; Djeparov 90+3' (pen.) |

Spartak Manege, Moscow
Attendance: 700
Referee: Romāns Lajuks (Latvia)

=== Group B ===
| Team | Pld | W | D | L | GF | GA | GD | Pts |
|---|---|---|---|---|---|---|---|---|
| (Georgia (country)) Dinamo Tbilisi | 3 | 2 | 1 | 0 | 14 | 6 | +8 | 7 |
| (Latvia) Skonto Riga | 3 | 2 | 1 | 0 | 11 | 3 | +8 | 7 |
| (Kazakhstan) Irtysh Pavlodar | 3 | 1 | 0 | 2 | 8 | 8 | 0 | 3 |
| (Kyrgyzstan) Zhashtyk-Ak-Altyn Kara-Suu | 3 | 0 | 0 | 3 | 2 | 18 | −16 | 0 |

==== Results ====
17 January 2004
15:00

| Skonto Riga (Latvia) | 2 – 1 | (Kazakhstan) Irtysh Pavlodar |
|---|---|---|
| Miholaps 34'; Buitkus 78' | | Nurdauletov 52' |

Olympic Sport Complex, Moscow
Attendance: 1,000
Referee: Yuri Baskakov (Russia)
17 January 2004
15:00

| Zhashtyk-Ak-Altyn Kara-Suu (Kyrgyzstan) | 1 – 7 | (Georgia (country)) Dinamo Tbilisi |
|---|---|---|
| Chikishev 70' | | Daraselia 16', 17'; Iashvili 49'; Aleksidze 53'; Burduli 60', 89' (pen.); Melkadze 75' |

Spartak Manege, Moscow
Attendance: 400
Referee: Mamed Mamedov (Turkmenistan)

18 January 2004
15:00

| Dinamo Tbilisi (Georgia (country)) | 2 – 2 | (Latvia) Skonto Riga |
|---|---|---|
| Iashvili 6'; Melkadze 78' | | Miholaps 39'; Korgalidze 45' |

Olympic Sport Complex, Moscow
Attendance: 1,500
Referee: Valentin Ivanov (Russia)
18 January 2004
15:00

| Irtysh Pavlodar (Kazakhstan) | 4 – 1 | (Kyrgyzstan) Zhashtyk-Ak-Altyn Kara-Suu |
|---|---|---|
| Ivanov 30', 49'; Zheilitbayev 33'; Agaýew 45' | | Koshbekov 90' |

Spartak Manege, Moscow
Attendance: 300
Referee: Vladislav Tseytlin (Uzbekistan)

20 January 2004
15:00

| Dinamo Tbilisi (Georgia (country)) | 5 – 3 | (Kazakhstan) Irtysh Pavlodar |
|---|---|---|
| Daraselia 15'; Anchabadze 18'; Aleksidze 25'; Burduli 45'; Shashiashvili 56' | | Agaýew 43'; Usmonov 48'; Davletov 71' (pen.) |

Olympic Sport Complex, Moscow
Attendance: 1,000
Referee: Nikolai Ivanov (Russia)
20 January 2004
15:00

| Skonto Riga (Latvia) | 7 – 0 | (Kyrgyzstan) Zhashtyk-Ak-Altyn Kara-Suu |
|---|---|---|
| Miholaps 25', 65' (pen.); Blanks 45'; Kalniņš 46', 52'; Ševļakovs 57'; Starkovs 66' |

Spartak Manege, Moscow
Attendance: 300
Referee: Rahmon Murtazayev (Tajikistan)

=== Group C ===
| Team | Pld | W | D | L | GF | GA | GD | Pts |
|---|---|---|---|---|---|---|---|---|
| (Ukraine) Dynamo Kyiv | 3 | 2 | 1 | 0 | 6 | 1 | +5 | 7 |
| (Estonia) Flora Tallinn | 3 | 2 | 0 | 1 | 3 | 4 | −1 | 6 |
| (Armenia) Pyunik Yerevan | 3 | 1 | 0 | 2 | 2 | 2 | 0 | 3 |
| (Turkmenistan) Nisa Aşgabat | 3 | 0 | 1 | 2 | 2 | 5 | −3 | 1 |

==== Results ====
17 January 2004
17:00

| Dynamo Kyiv (Ukraine) | 1 – 1 | (Turkmenistan) Nisa Aşgabat |
|---|---|---|
| Khatskevich 44' | | Daý.Urazow 83' |

Olympic Sport Complex, Moscow
Attendance: 1,500
Referee: Levan Paniashvili (Georgia)
17 January 2004
17:00

| Flora Tallinn (Estonia) | 1 – 0 | (Armenia) Pyunik Yerevan |
|---|---|---|
| Zahovaiko 32' (pen.) |

Spartak Manege, Moscow
Attendance: 300
Referee: Igor Kister (Kazakhstan)

18 January 2004
17:00

| Pyunik Yerevan (Armenia) | 0 – 1 | (Ukraine) Dynamo Kyiv |
|---|---|---|
| | | Melaschenko 14' |

Olympic Sport Complex, Moscow
Attendance: 1,500
Referee: Aleksei Tyumin (Russia)
18 January 2004
17:00

| Nisa Aşgabat (Turkmenistan) | 0 – 2 | (Estonia) Flora Tallinn |
|---|---|---|
| | | Viikmäe 55'; Sidorenkov 64' |

Spartak Manege, Moscow
Attendance: 300
Referee: Imankhan Sultani (Azerbaijan)

20 January 2004
17:00

| Dynamo Kyiv (Ukraine) | 4 – 0 | (Estonia) Flora Tallinn |
|---|---|---|
| Khatskevich 11'; Česnauskis 25'; Vorobey 60'; Milevskyi 81' (pen.) |

Olympic Sport Complex, Moscow
Attendance: 1,000
Referee: Alexander Gonchar (Russia)
20 January 2004
17:00

| Pyunik Yerevan (Armenia) | 2 – 1 | (Turkmenistan) Nisa Aşgabat |
|---|---|---|
| Tadevosyan 85'; Grigoryan 90+3' | | Daý.Urazow 35' |

Spartak Manege, Moscow
Attendance: 300
Referee: Igor Kister (Kazakhstan)

=== Group D ===
- Unofficial table

| Team | Pld | W | D | L | GF | GA | GD | Pts |
|---|---|---|---|---|---|---|---|---|
| (Lithuania) FBK Kaunas | 3 | 2 | 1 | 0 | 5 | 0 | +5 | 7 |
| Russia U19 | 3 | 1 | 1 | 1 | 2 | 3 | −1 | 4 |
| (Moldova) Sheriff Tiraspol | 3 | 0 | 3 | 0 | 1 | 1 | 0 | 3 |
| (Azerbaijan) Qarabağ-Azersun | 3 | 0 | 1 | 2 | 0 | 4 | −4 | 1 |

- Official table

| Team | Pld | W | D | L | GF | GA | GD | Pts |
|---|---|---|---|---|---|---|---|---|
| (Lithuania) FBK Kaunas | 2 | 1 | 1 | 0 | 3 | 0 | +3 | 4 |
| (Moldova) Sheriff Tiraspol | 2 | 0 | 2 | 0 | 0 | 0 | 0 | 2 |
| (Azerbaijan) Qarabağ-Azersun | 2 | 0 | 1 | 1 | 0 | 3 | −3 | 1 |

==== Results ====
17 January 2004
13:00

| Sheriff Tiraspol (Moldova) | 0 – 0 | (Lithuania) FBK Kaunas |

Olympic Sport Complex, Moscow
Attendance: 500
Referee: Sergey Shmolik (Belarus)
17 January 2004
13:00

| Qarabağ-Azersun (Azerbaijan) | 0 – 1 | Russia U19 |
|---|---|---|
| | | Melnikov 20' |

Spartak Manege, Moscow
Attendance: 800
Referee: Kadyrbek Chynybekov (Kyrgyzstan)

18 January 2004
13:00

| Qarabağ-Azersun (Azerbaijan) | 0 – 0 | (Moldova) Sheriff Tiraspol |

Olympic Sport Complex, Moscow
Attendance: 500
Referee: Aleksandr Gvardis (Russia)
18 January 2004
13:00

| Russia U19 | 0 – 2 | (Lithuania) FBK Kaunas |
|---|---|---|
| | | Bezykornovas 34' (pen.); Rimkevičius 55' |

Spartak Manege, Moscow
Attendance: 500
Referee: Rahmon Murtazayev (Tajikistan)

20 January 2004
13:00

| FBK Kaunas (Lithuania) | 3 – 0 | (Azerbaijan) Qarabağ-Azersun |
|---|---|---|
| Opic 23', 34'; Žvingilas 83' |

Olympic Sport Complex, Moscow
Attendance: 1,000
Referee: Levan Paniashvili (Georgia)
20 January 2004
13:00

| Sheriff Tiraspol (Moldova) | 1 – 1 | Russia U19 |
|---|---|---|
| Leandro 38' | | Sapin 80' |

Spartak Manege, Moscow
Attendance: 300
Referee: Vladislav Tseytlin (Uzbekistan)

== Final rounds ==
Quarterfinals (21 Jan)
(Georgia (country)) | Dinamo Tbilisi | 4
(Belarus) | Gomel | 1
(Ukraine) | Dynamo Kyiv | 0
(Moldova) | Sheriff Tiraspol | 1
(Lithuania) | FBK Kaunas (p) | 2
(Estonia) | Flora Tallinn | 2
(Russia) | CSKA Moscow | 0
(Latvia) | Skonto Riga | 1

Semifinals (23 Jan)
(Georgia (country)) | Dinamo Tbilisi | 2
(Moldova) | Sheriff Tiraspol | 1
(Lithuania) | FBK Kaunas | 0
(Latvia) | Skonto Riga | 1

Final (25 Jan)
(Georgia (country)) | Dinamo Tbilisi | 3
(Latvia) | Skonto Riga | 1

=== Quarterfinals ===
21 January 2004
13:00

| FBK Kaunas (Lithuania) | 2 – 2 | (Estonia) Flora Tallinn |
|---|---|---|
| Sanajevas 42'; Rähn 44' (o.g.) | | Rooba 26'; Sidorenkov 84' |
Penalties
| Beniušis (penalty scored); Pastva (penalty scored); Papečkys (penalty missed); Regelskis (penalty scored) | 3 – 2 | (penalty scored) Rooba; (penalty missed) Zahovaiko; (penalty scored) Reim; (penalty missed) Piiroja; (penalty missed) Viikmäe |

Olympic Sport Complex, Moscow
Attendance: 1,000
Referee: Vitaliy Hodulyan (Ukraine)
21 January 2004
15:00

| Dinamo Tbilisi (Georgia (country)) | 4 – 1 | (Belarus) Gomel |
|---|---|---|
| Aleksidze 2'; Melkadze 10'; Shashiashvili 35'; Daraselia 72' | | Usaw 21' (pen.) |

Olympic Sport Complex, Moscow
Attendance: 1,000
Referee: Yuri Baskakov (Russia)
21 January 2004
17:00

| Dynamo Kyiv (Ukraine) | 0 – 1 | (Moldova) Sheriff Tiraspol |
|---|---|---|
| | | Barîșev 70' |

Olympic Sport Complex, Moscow
Attendance: 1,000
Referee: Imankhan Sultani (Azerbaijan)
21 January 2004
19:00

| CSKA Moscow (Russia) | 0 – 1 | (Latvia) Skonto Riga |
|---|---|---|
| | | Buitkus 32' |

Olympic Sport Complex, Moscow
Attendance: 1,000
Referee: Sergey Shmolik (Belarus)

=== Semifinals ===
23 January 2004
16:00

| Dinamo Tbilisi (Georgia (country)) | 2 – 1 | (Moldova) Sheriff Tiraspol |
|---|---|---|
| Gogoberishvili 45+1'; Daraselia 72' | | Barîșev 14' |

Olympic Sport Complex, Moscow
Attendance: 1,500
Referee: Romāns Lajuks (Latvia)
23 January 2004
19:00

| FBK Kaunas (Lithuania) | 0 – 1 | (Latvia) Skonto Riga |
|---|---|---|
| | | Korgalidze 80' |

Olympic Sport Complex, Moscow
Attendance: 1,000
Referee: Karen Nalbandyan (Armenia)

=== Finals ===
25 January 2004
13:00

| Dinamo Tbilisi (Georgia (country)) | 3 – 1 | (Latvia) Skonto Riga |
|---|---|---|
| Daraselia 44'; Aleksidze 73'; Kvirkvelia 85' | | Kalniņš 85' |

Olympic Sport Complex, Moscow
Attendance: 3,000
Referee: Valentin Ivanov (Russia)

== Top scorers ==
| Rank | Player | Team | Goals |
|---|---|---|---|
| 1 | (Georgia (country)) Vitaly Daraselia | (Georgia (country)) Dinamo Tbilisi | 6 |
| 2 | (Georgia (country)) Rati Aleksidze | (Georgia (country)) Dinamo Tbilisi | 4 |
| 2 | (Latvia) Mihails Miholaps | (Latvia) Skonto Riga | 4 |
| 4 | (Georgia (country)) Vladimir Burduli | (Georgia (country)) Dinamo Tbilisi | 3 |
| 4 | (Georgia (country)) Levan Melkadze | (Georgia (country)) Dinamo Tbilisi | 3 |
| 4 | (Latvia) Gatis Kalniņš | (Latvia) Skonto Riga | 3 |
