= 2001 Commonwealth of Independent States Cup =

CIS Cup, Кубок Содружества 2001

Tournament details
- Host country: Russia
- Dates: 20–28 January 2001
- Teams: 16
- Venues: 2 (in 1 host city)

Final positions
- Champions: (Russia) Spartak Moscow (6th title)

Tournament statistics
- Matches played: 29
- Goals scored: 99 (3.41 per match)
- Top scorer(s): (Brazil) Marcão (Uzbekistan) Jafar Irismetov (Belarus) Valery Strypeykis (Belarus) Raman Vasilyuk (Georgia (country)) Mikheil Ashvetia (4 goals)

The 2001 Commonwealth of Independent States Cup was the ninth edition of the competition between the champions of former republics of Soviet Union. It was won by Spartak Moscow for the sixth time overall and third in a row. For the third and final time the competition was played in a two-division format (first introduced in 1999). The next year the format was changed, mostly due to relegation of Ukraine from the top division.

== Participants ==
Team	Qualification	Participation
Top Division
(Russia) Spartak Moscow	2000 Russian Top Division champions	8th
(Ukraine) Dynamo Kyiv	1999–2000 Vyshcha Liha champions	6th
(Belarus) Slavia Mozyr	2000 Belarusian Premier League champions	2nd
(Lithuania) FBK Kaunas	2000 A Lyga champions	3rd
(Latvia) Skonto Riga	2000 Latvian Higher League champions	9th
(Moldova) Zimbru Chișinău	1999–2000 Moldovan National Division champions	8th
(Tajikistan) Varzob Dushanbe	2000 Tajik League champions	3rd
(Turkmenistan) Köpetdag Aşgabat	2000 Ýokary Liga champions	8th
First Division
(Armenia) Araks Ararat	2000 Armenian Premier League champions	2nd
(Azerbaijan) Shamkir	1999–2000 Azerbaijan Top League champions	1st
(Estonia) Levadia Maardu	2000 Meistriliiga champions	2nd
(Georgia (country)) Torpedo Kutaisi	1999–2000 Umaglesi Liga champions	1st
(Kazakhstan) Zhenis Astana	2000 Kazakhstan Premier League champions	1st
(Uzbekistan) Dustlik Tashkent	2000 Uzbek League champions	2nd
(Kyrgyzstan) Zhashtyk-Ak-Altyn Kara-Suu	2000 Kyrgyzstan League 4th team ^{1}	1st
Russia U21	Unofficial entry, not eligible for promotion	6th

- ^{1} Zhashtyk-Ak-Altyn Kara-Suu replaced SKA-PVO Bishkek (2000 Kyrgyzstan champions), who withdrew having most of their players busy in a national team training camp.

== First Division ==
=== Group C ===
Team	Pld	W	D	L	GF	GA	GD	Pts
(Georgia (country)) Torpedo Kutaisi	3	3	0	0	8	1	+7	9
(Azerbaijan) Shamkir	3	1	1	1	8	3	+5	4
(Uzbekistan) Dustlik Tashkent	3	1	1	1	8	4	+4	4
(Kyrgyzstan) Zhashtyk-Ak-Altyn Kara-Suu	3	0	0	3	0	16	−16	0

- Georgia promoted to the Top Division

==== Results ====
20 January 2001
15:00

Torpedo Kutaisi (Georgia (country))	3 – 0	(Kyrgyzstan) Zhashtyk-Ak-Altyn Kara-Suu
Ashvetia 83', 89'; Shalamberidze 88'

Spartak Manege, Moscow
Attendance: 1,000
Referee: Gennady Zhukovskiy (Kazakhstan)
20 January 2001
19:00

Shamkir (Azerbaijan)	1 – 1	(Uzbekistan) Dustlik Tashkent
Ashurmatov 85' (o.g.)		Isoqov 6'

Spartak Manege, Moscow
Attendance: 500
Referee: Ghenadie Orlic (Moldova)

21 January 2001
15:00

Shamkir (Azerbaijan)	1 – 2	(Georgia (country)) Torpedo Kutaisi
Kvaratskhelia 58'		Ionanidze 20'; Ashvetia 60'

Olympic Sport Complex, Moscow
Attendance: 3,000
Referee: Darius Mieželis (Lithuania)
21 January 2001
15:00

Dustlik Tashkent (Uzbekistan)	7 – 0	(Kyrgyzstan) Zhashtyk-Ak-Altyn Kara-Suu
Soliev 15', 56', 78'; Isoqov 19', 74'; Dokuchaev 21' (o.g.); Akhmerov 58'

Spartak Manege, Moscow
Attendance: 250
Referee: Mamed Mamedov (Turkmenistan)

23 January 2001
17:00

Torpedo Kutaisi (Georgia (country))	3 – 0	(Uzbekistan) Dustlik Tashkent
Ashvetia 47'; Ionanidze 69'; Asatiani 75'

Spartak Manege, Moscow
Attendance: 550
Referee: Karen Nalbandyan (Armenia)
23 January 2001
19:00

Zhashtyk-Ak-Altyn Kara-Suu (Kyrgyzstan)	0 – 6	(Azerbaijan) Shamkir
		Rzayev 15', 86' (pen.), 88' (pen.); I.Mammadov 65'; Kulykov 69'; M.Qurbanov 78'

Spartak Manege, Moscow
Attendance: 100
Referee: Andrejs Sipailo (Latvia)

=== Group D ===
- Unofficial table

Team	Pld	W	D	L	GF	GA	GD	Pts
Russia U21	3	3	0	0	9	5	+4	9
(Armenia) Araks Ararat	3	1	1	1	6	6	0	4
(Estonia) Levadia Maardu	3	0	2	1	5	7	−2	2
(Kazakhstan) Zhenis Astana	3	0	1	2	3	5	−2	1

- Official table

Team	Pld	W	D	L	GF	GA	GD	Pts
(Armenia) Araks Ararat	2	1	1	0	4	3	+1	4
(Estonia) Levadia Maardu	2	0	2	0	3	3	0	2
(Kazakhstan) Zhenis Astana	2	0	1	1	2	3	−1	1

- Armenia promoted to the Top Division

==== Results ====
20 January 2001
13:00

Zhenis Astana (Kazakhstan)	1 – 2	(Armenia) Araks Ararat
Tlekhugov 64'		Ara Hakobyan 45', 45'

Olympic Sport Complex, Moscow
Attendance: 1,000
Referee: Andrejs Sipailo (Latvia)
20 January 2001
13:00

Russia U21	4 – 2	(Estonia) Levadia Maardu
Mysin 2'; Bazayev 25'; Rodin 61', 83' (pen.)		Rõtškov 53' (pen.); Tšelnokov 73'

Spartak Manege, Moscow
Attendance: 300
Referee: Nail Lutfullin (Uzbekistan)

21 January 2001
13:00

Russia U21	3 – 2	(Armenia) Araks Ararat
Bazayev 20' (pen.); Pavlyuchenko 41'; Trifonov 43'		H.Hakobyan 8', 27'

Spartak Manege, Moscow
Attendance: 250
Referee: Abduraim Babaev (Tajikistan)
21 January 2001
17:00

Levadia Maardu (Estonia)	1 – 1	(Kazakhstan) Zhenis Astana
Fenin 82'		Tlekhugov 63'

Spartak Manege, Moscow
Attendance: 200
Referee: Khagani Mamedov (Azerbaijan)

23 January 2001
13:00

Zhenis Astana (Kazakhstan)	1 – 2	Russia U21
Aksenov 82'		Pavlyuchenko 49'; Rodin 63'

Spartak Manege, Moscow
Attendance: 200
Referee: Darius Mieželis (Lithuania)
23 January 2001
15:00

Levadia Maardu (Estonia)	2 – 2	(Armenia) Araks Ararat
Bragin 42'; Rõtškov 64' (pen.)		Harutyunyan 4'; H.Hakobyan 88'

Spartak Manege, Moscow
Attendance: 500
Referee: Serhiy Shebek (Ukraine)

== Top Division ==
=== Group A ===
Team	Pld	W	D	L	GF	GA	GD	Pts
(Russia) Spartak Moscow	3	3	0	0	9	2	+7	9
(Belarus) Slavia Mozyr	3	1	1	1	6	7	−1	4
(Lithuania) FBK Kaunas	3	1	0	2	5	6	−1	3
(Tajikistan) Varzob Dushanbe	3	0	1	2	2	7	−5	1

- Tajikistan relegated to First Division

==== Results ====
20 January 2001
17:00

Varzob Dushanbe (Tajikistan)	0 – 2	(Lithuania) FBK Kaunas
		Velička 8'; Dedura 62'

Spartak Manege, Moscow
Attendance: 700
Referee: Valentin Ivanov (Russia)
20 January 2001
19:00

Spartak Moscow (Russia)	3 – 1	(Belarus) Slavia Mozyr
Titov 43'; Irismetov 63', 87'		Vasilyuk 90'

Olympic Sport Complex, Moscow
Attendance: 15,000
Referee: Karen Nalbandyan (Armenia)

21 January 2001
13:00

Slavia Mozyr (Belarus)	1 – 1	(Tajikistan) Varzob Dushanbe
Vasilyuk 45'		Ashurmamadov 46'

Olympic Sport Complex, Moscow
Attendance: 500
Referee: Serhiy Shebek (Ukraine)
21 January 2001
19:00

FBK Kaunas (Lithuania)	0 – 2	(Russia) Spartak Moscow
		Hranovskyi 10'; Parfenov 57' (pen.)

Olympic Sport Complex, Moscow
Attendance: 13,000
Referee: Viktor Kolpakov (Kyrgyzstan)

23 January 2001
15:00

Slavia Mozyr (Belarus)	4 – 3	(Lithuania) FBK Kaunas
Strypeykis 56', 82'; Vasilyuk 64' (pen.); Lukashenko 79'		Velička 35'; Puotkalis 71'; Kančelskis 90'

Olympic Sport Complex, Moscow
Attendance: 1,000
Referee: Merab Malaguradze (Georgia)
23 January 2001
19:00

Spartak Moscow (Russia)	4 – 1	(Tajikistan) Varzob Dushanbe
Marcão 21', 79'; Irismetov 53'; Titov 76'		Khamidov 2'

Olympic Sport Complex, Moscow
Attendance: 8,000
Referee: Khagani Mamedov (Azerbaijan)

=== Group B ===
Team	Pld	W	D	L	GF	GA	GD	Pts
(Latvia) Skonto Riga	3	1	2	0	3	2	+1	5
(Turkmenistan) Köpetdag Aşgabat	3	1	2	0	2	1	+1	5
(Moldova) Zimbru Chișinău	3	0	2	1	4	5	−1	2
(Ukraine) Dynamo Kyiv	3	0	2	1	3	4	−1	2

- Ukraine relegated to First Division

==== Results ====
20 January 2001
15:00

Zimbru Chișinău (Moldova)	2 – 2	(Latvia) Skonto Riga
Kulik 24' (pen.); Berco 32'		Zemļinskis 26' (pen.); Menteshashvili 30'

Olympic Sport Complex, Moscow
Attendance: 1,000
Referee: Yuri Baskakov (Russia)
20 January 2001
17:00

Dynamo Kyiv (Ukraine)	1 – 1	(Turkmenistan) Köpetdag Aşgabat
Cernat 90'		Mingazow 45'

Olympic Sport Complex, Moscow
Attendance: 9,000
Referee: Oleg Timofejev (Estonia)

21 January 2001
17:00

Skonto Riga (Latvia)	1 – 0	(Ukraine) Dynamo Kyiv
Buitkus 20'

Olympic Sport Complex, Moscow
Attendance: 5,000
Referee: Oleg Chikun (Belarus)
21 January 2001
19:00

Köpetdag Aşgabat (Turkmenistan)	1 – 0	(Moldova) Zimbru Chișinău
Kuljagazow 12'

Spartak Manege, Moscow
Attendance: 200
Referee: Merab Malaguradze (Georgia)

23 January 2001
13:00

Köpetdag Aşgabat (Turkmenistan)	0 – 0	(Latvia) Skonto Riga

Olympic Sport Complex, Moscow
Attendance: 500
Referee: Valentin Ivanov (Russia)
23 January 2001
17:00

Zimbru Chișinău (Moldova)	2 – 2	(Ukraine) Dynamo Kyiv
Miterev 26'; Stavilă 77'		Fedorov 33'; Byalkevich 63'

Olympic Sport Complex, Moscow
Attendance: 5,000
Referee: Viktor Kolpakov (Kyrgyzstan)

== Final rounds ==
=== Semifinal ===
- Two results carried over from the First Round: Spartak v Slavia 3–1 and Köpetdag v Skonto 0–0

Team	Pld	W	D	L	GF	GA	GD	Pts
(Russia) Spartak Moscow	3	3	0	0	9	2	+7	9
(Latvia) Skonto Riga	3	1	1	1	4	5	−1	4
(Belarus) Slavia Mozyr	3	1	0	2	6	6	0	3
(Turkmenistan) Köpetdag Aşgabat	3	0	1	2	0	6	−6	1

==== Results ====
24 January 2001
16:30

Slavia Mozyr (Belarus)	1 – 3	(Latvia) Skonto Riga
Sļesarčuks 38'		Miholaps 14'; Zakreševskis 26'; Koļesņičenko 44'

Olympic Sport Complex, Moscow
Attendance: 3,000
Referee: Khagani Mamedov (Azerbaijan)
24 January 2001
19:00

Spartak Moscow (Russia)	2 – 0	(Turkmenistan) Köpetdag Aşgabat
Robson 30'; Irismetov 61'

Olympic Sport Complex, Moscow
Attendance: 12,000
Referee: Oleg Chikun (Belarus)

26 January 2001
16:30

Köpetdag Aşgabat (Turkmenistan)	0 – 4	(Belarus) Slavia Mozyr
		Strypeykis 13', 60'; Vasilyuk 41'; Samatov 77'

Olympic Sport Complex, Moscow
Attendance: 1,500
Referee: Viktor Kolpakov (Kyrgyzstan)
26 January 2001
19:00

Skonto Riga (Latvia)	1 – 4	(Russia) Spartak Moscow
Korgalidze 44'		Lobaņovs 2' (o.g.); Marcão 45', 51'; Bulatov 70'

Olympic Sport Complex, Moscow
Attendance: 9,000
Referee: Karen Nalbandyan (Armenia)

=== Final ===
28 January 2001
14:00

Spartak Moscow (Russia)	2 – 1 (a.e.t.)	(Latvia) Skonto Riga
Robson 75'; Tsykhmeystruk 99'		Laizāns 28'

Olympic Sport Complex, Moscow
Attendance: 25,000
Referee: Serhiy Shebek (Ukraine)

== Top scorers ==
Rank	Player	Team	Goals
1	(Brazil) Marcão	(Russia) Spartak Moscow	4
1	(Uzbekistan) Jafar Irismetov	(Russia) Spartak Moscow	4
1	(Belarus) Valery Strypeykis	(Belarus) Slavia Mozyr	4
1	(Belarus) Raman Vasilyuk	(Belarus) Slavia Mozyr	4
1	(Georgia (country)) Mikheil Ashvetia	(Georgia (country)) Torpedo Kutaisi	4
6	(Uzbekistan) Umid Isoqov	(Uzbekistan) Dustlik Tashkent	3
6	(Uzbekistan) Anvarjon Soliev	(Uzbekistan) Dustlik Tashkent	3
6	(Armenia) Hayk Hakobyan	(Armenia) Araks Ararat	3
6	(Azerbaijan) Vidadi Rzayev	(Azerbaijan) Shamkir	3
6	(Russia) Sergei Rodin	Russia U21	3
