= Football at the Spartakiad of the Peoples of the USSR =

Association Football at the Spartakiads of Peoples of the USSR
- Founded: 1956
- Region: Soviet Union
- Teams: 17 (from 15 Soviet republics)
- Current champions: Ukrainian SSR (1st title)
- Most championships: Moscow (2 titles)

Association football while being included in the 1956 Spartakiad of the Peoples of the USSR was not a regular event at Spartakiads until 1979.

The inaugural tournament was conducted in preparation for the football tournament at the 1956 Summer Olympics. The competition involved many experienced players of the Soviet Top League.

It was resumed only after over 20 years as a competition for preparation for the football tournament at the 1980 Summer Olympics and throughout the 1980s became a regular event of the Spartakiad. However the football tournament was not conducted at the 1990 Spartakiad of Peoples of the USSR and never resumed again.

== Records ==
Year	Host	Final			Third place		
Year	Host	Gold Medalists	Score	Silver Medalists	Bronze Medalists	Score	4th place
among senior teams
1956; Details		Moscow	2 – 1	(Georgian Soviet Socialist Republic); Georgian SSR	(Ukrainian Soviet Socialist Republic); Ukrainian SSR	2 – 1	Leningrad
1979; Details	Moscow Kyiv Minsk	Moscow	2 – 1	(Georgian Soviet Socialist Republic); Georgian SSR	(Ukrainian Soviet Socialist Republic); Ukrainian SSR	2 – 1	(Russian Soviet Federative Socialist Republic); Russian SFSR
among junior teams
1983; Details	(Russian Soviet Federative Socialist Republic)	(Lithuanian Soviet Socialist Republic); Lithuanian SSR	1 – 0	(Russian Soviet Federative Socialist Republic); Russian SFSR	Moscow	1 – 1	(Ukrainian Soviet Socialist Republic); Ukrainian SSR
1983; Details	(Russian Soviet Federative Socialist Republic)	(Lithuanian Soviet Socialist Republic); Lithuanian SSR	1 – 0	(Russian Soviet Federative Socialist Republic); Russian SFSR	3 – 1 on penalty shootout		
1986; Details	(Ukrainian Soviet Socialist Republic)	(Ukrainian Soviet Socialist Republic); Ukrainian SSR	1 – 0	(Uzbek Soviet Socialist Republic); Uzbek SSR	Moscow	3 – 1	(Moldavian Soviet Socialist Republic); Moldavian SSR

- Key:
  - aet – after extra time
  - asdet – after sudden death extra time

== Medal table ==
Rank	Republic	Gold	Silver	Bronze	Total
1	Moscow	2	0	2	4
2	Ukrainian SSR	1	0	2	3
3	Lithuanian SSR	1	0	0	1
4	Georgian SSR	0	2	0	2
5	Russian SFSR	0	1	0	1
5	Uzbek SSR	0	1	0	1
Totals (6 entries)		4	4	4	12

== See also ==
- Commonwealth of Independent States Cup
