= Rustam Ragimov =

Soviet football referee (born 1948)

Rüstəm Rəhimov
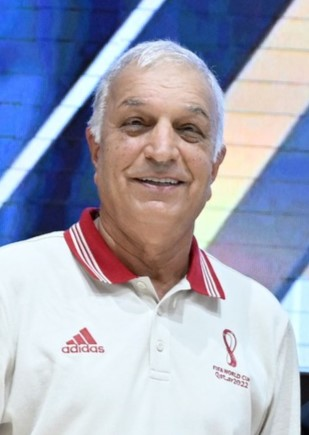
- Born: Rüstəm Tələt oğlu Rəhimov; 6 March 1948; Baku, Azerbaijan SSR, Transcaucasian SFSR, USSR
- Occupations: Football player and referee

Rustam Ragimov (Azerbaijani: Rüstəm Rəhimov; Russian: Рустам Рагимов; 6 March 1948) is a Soviet footballer and football referee from Azerbaijan.

== Early life ==
Rustam Ragimov was born on 6 March 1948 in Baku.

== Refereeing career ==
Ragimov started his refereeing career, at the insistence of FIFA arbitrator Eldar Azimzade, by managing the games of the second division in 1977–1978. In 1994, the last match he refereed was the 1994 Commonwealth of Independent States Cup Final between FC Neftchi Fergana and FC Spartak Moscow. After retiring as a referee, he served for some years as a football manager.
