= Mikhail Zhabkin =

Russian footballer

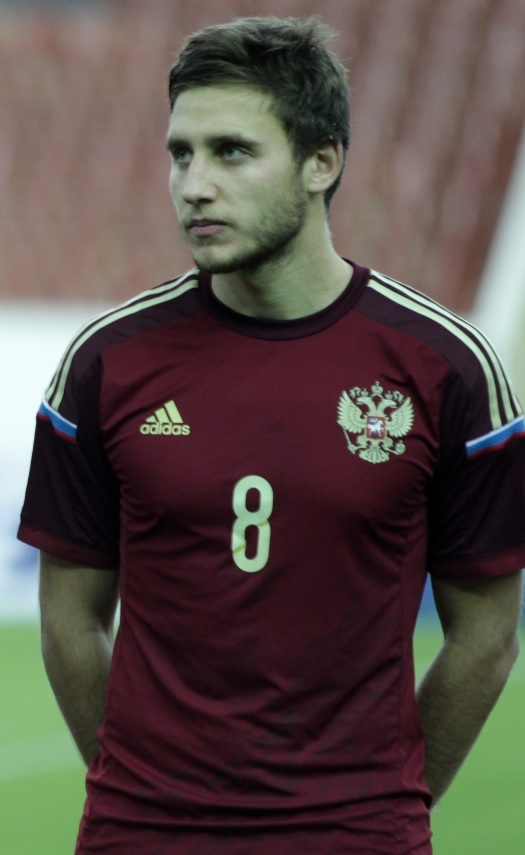
- Zhabkin with Russia U-21 in 2016

Personal information
- Full name: Mikhail Aleksandrovich Zhabkin
- Date of birth: 1 March 1994 (age 32)
- Height: 1.79 m (5 ft 10 in)
- Positions: Forward; midfielder

Senior career*
Years	Team	Apps	(Gls)
2011–2012	FC Dynamo Moscow	0	(0)
2013	FC Volgar-Astrakhan Astrakhan	3	(0)
2013–2018	FC Volgar Astrakhan	63	(1)
2018–2019	FC Spartak Vladikavkaz	23	(8)
2019	Kuban-Holding (amateur)		
2019–2020	FC West Armenia	21	(16)
2020	Kuban-Holding	5	(0)
2020–2021	FC West Armenia	10	(6)
2021	Kuban-Holding	13	(0)
2022	FC Metallurg Vidnoye	10	(6)
2022	FC Elektron Veliky Novgorod	6	(0)

International career
2011	Russia U-17	7	(1)
2011–2012	Russia U-18	7	(1)
2012	Russia U-19	3	(0)
2016	Russia U-21	4	(3)
- * Club domestic league appearances and goals

Mikhail Aleksandrovich Zhabkin (Russian: Михаил Александрович Жабкин; born 1 March 1994) is a Russian former football player.

== Club career ==
He made his debut in the Russian Second Division for FC Volgar-Astrakhan Astrakhan on 15 April 2013 in a game against FC Olimpia Volgograd.

He made his Russian Football National League debut for FC Volgar Astrakhan on 5 October 2014 in a game against FC SKA-Energiya Khabarovsk.

== Honours ==
=== Individual ===
- CIS Cup top goalscorer: 2016
