= Anton Kuksin =

Kazakhstani association football player

Personal information
- Full name: Anton Sergeevich Kuksin
- Date of birth: 3 July 1995 (age 31)
- Place of birth: Kokshetau, Kazakhstan
- Height: 1.84 m (6 ft 0 in)
- Position: Right-back

Youth career
- Okzhetpes

Senior career*
Years	Team	Apps	(Gls)
2012–2018	Okzhetpes	95	(4)
2016–2018	→ Okzhetpes-2 (loan)	10	(1)
2019	Akzhayik	14	(0)
2020–2021	Tyumen	23	(0)
2021	Irtysh Omsk	17	(2)
2022–2023	Okzhetpes	11	(0)
- * Club domestic league appearances and goals

Anton Sergeevich Kuksin (Russian: Антон Сергеевич Куксин; born 3 July 1995) is a Kazakhstani former footballer who played as a right-back.

== Career ==
Kuksin started his career with Kazakhstani top flight side Okzhetpes, where he made 95 league appearances and scored 4 goals.

Before the 2019 season, he signed for Akzhayik in the Kazakhstani second division.

In 2020, Kuksin signed for Russian club Tyumen after almost signing for SC Verl in Germany and receiving interest from Estonia.
