= Levan Melkadze =

Georgian footballer

Personal information
- Full name: Levan Melkadze
- Date of birth: 12 December 1979 (age 46)
- Place of birth: Soviet Union
- Height: 1.86 m (6 ft 1 in)
- Position: Forward

Senior career*
Years	Team	Apps	(Gls)
1997–1998	TSU Tbilisi	8	(0)
1998–1999	Dinamo Tbilisi	7	(2)
1999	Tbilisi	13	(6)
2000–2003	WIT Georgia	75	(42)
2001	→ Siena (loan)	0	(0)
2003–2006	Dinamo Tbilisi	64	(34)
2006	Vålerenga	1	(0)
2007–2008	Shakhter Karagandy	21	(8)
2008–2009	Zestaponi	15	(3)
2009–2010	Sioni Bolnisi	15	(2)
2012–2013	Spartaki-Tskhinvali Tbilisi	18	(7)

International career
2001–2004	Georgia	5	(0)
- * Club domestic league appearances and goals

Levan Melkadze (Georgian: ლევან მელქაძე, born 12 December 1979) is a Georgian footballer.

He has played for TSU Tbilisi, Tbilisi, FC WIT Georgia, AC Siena and FC Dinamo Tbilisi. In the 2005 season Melkadze was the topscorer in the Georgian Premier League scoring 27 goals in 31 matches for FC Dinamo Tbilisi. The Norwegian club Vålerenga bought him ahead of the 2006 season, but he did not impress and they released him from his contract the following summer. He subsequently joined Kazakhstani team FC Shakhter.

He has 5 caps for the Georgian national team.
