= Victor Barîșev =

Moldovan footballer

Personal information
- Full name: Victor Viktorovich Barîșev
- Date of birth: 3 July 1978 (age 48)
- Height: 1.85 m (6 ft 1 in)
- Position: Midfielder

Senior career*
| Years | Team | Apps | (Gls) |
| 1994–1995 | Tiligul Tiraspol | 12 | (0) |
| 1996 | Nistru Cioburciu | 1 | (0) |
| 1996 | Victoria Cahul | 6 | (1) |
| 1997–1998 | Tiligul Tiraspol | 21 | (4) |
| 1999–2000 | Sheriff Tiraspol | 33 | (3) |
| 2001 | Nistru Otaci | 10 | (2) |
| 2001 | Sheriff Tiraspol | 9 | (0) |
| 2002–2003 | Tiraspol | 33 | (7) |
| 2003–2004 | Sheriff Tiraspol | 27 | (6) |
| 2004 | Tiraspol | 12 | (0) |
| 2005 | Arsenal Kharkiv | 13 | (1) |
| 2005–2006 | Kharkiv | 1 | (0) |
| 2006–2007 | MKT-Araz İmişli | 16 | (1) |
| 2007–2008 | Iskra-Stal Rîbnița | 10 | (0) |
| 2008 | Qizilqum Zarafshon | 15 | (0) |

International career
| 2002–2005 | Moldova | 13 | (0) |
- * Club domestic league appearances and goals

Victor Viktorovich Barîșev (Russian: Виктор Викторович Барышев; born 3 July 1978) is a Moldovan former footballer who played as a midfielder.

== Club career ==
Barîșev spent most of his career in Moldova, but also played in Ukraine, Azerbaijan and Uzbekistan.

== International career ==
Barîșev made his debut for the Moldova national team on 9 February 2002 in a friendly match against Lithuania. He made 13 appearances in total for Moldova between 2002 and 2005.

== Personal life ==
His father, Victor Yurievich Barîșev, was a footballer and football coach in the Soviet Union and Moldova.
