= FC Volgar-Astrakhan Astrakhan =

- Full name: Football Club Volgar-Astrakhan Astrakhan
- Founded: 1996
- Dissolved: 2013
- 2012–13: 16th

FC Volgar-Astrakhan Astrakhan (Russian: «ФК Волгарь-Астрахань» Астрахань) was a Russian football team from Astrakhan. It played in the Russian Second Division in the 2012–13 season.

Volgar-Astrakhan was the reserves team of FC Volgar Astrakhan.
