= Besik Beradze =

Georgian footballer

Personal information
- Date of birth: 20 February 1968 (age 58)
- Place of birth: Sukhumi, Georgian SSR
- Height: 1.72 m (5 ft 8 in)
- Position: Defender

Senior career*
Years	Team	Apps	(Gls)
1986	FC Samgurali Tsqaltubo		
1989–1992	FC Samgurali Tsqaltubo		
1992–1994	FC Dinamo Tbilisi	62	(1)
1994	Trabzonspor	6	(0)
1995	FC Dinamo Tbilisi	17	(0)
1995	FC Samtredia	15	(0)
1996–1998	FC Chernomorets Novorossiysk	66	(0)
1999	FC Lokomotivi Tbilisi	2	(0)
2000–2002	FC Samgurali Tsqaltubo	60	(1)

International career
1994–1995	Georgia	8	(0)
- * Club domestic league appearances and goals

Besik Beradze (Georgian: ბესიკ ბერაძე; born 20 February 1968) is a retired Georgian professional football player.
