= Hayk Hakobyan =

Armenian footballer

Personal information
- Date of birth: 26 December 1980 (age 45)
- Height: 1.72 m (5 ft 7 1/2 in)
- Position: Forward

International career
Years	Team	Apps	(Gls)
1998–2001	Armenia	4	(1)

Hayk Hakobyan (Armenian: Հայկ Հակոբյան; born 26 December 1980) is an Armenian football player. He has played for Armenia national team.

== National team statistics ==
Armenia national team
Year	Apps	Goals
1998	1	0
1999	1	0
2000	0	0
2001	2	1
Total	4	1
