= Saint Petersburg Sports and Concert Complex =

Arena in Saint Petersburg, Russia

- SKK Peterburgsky
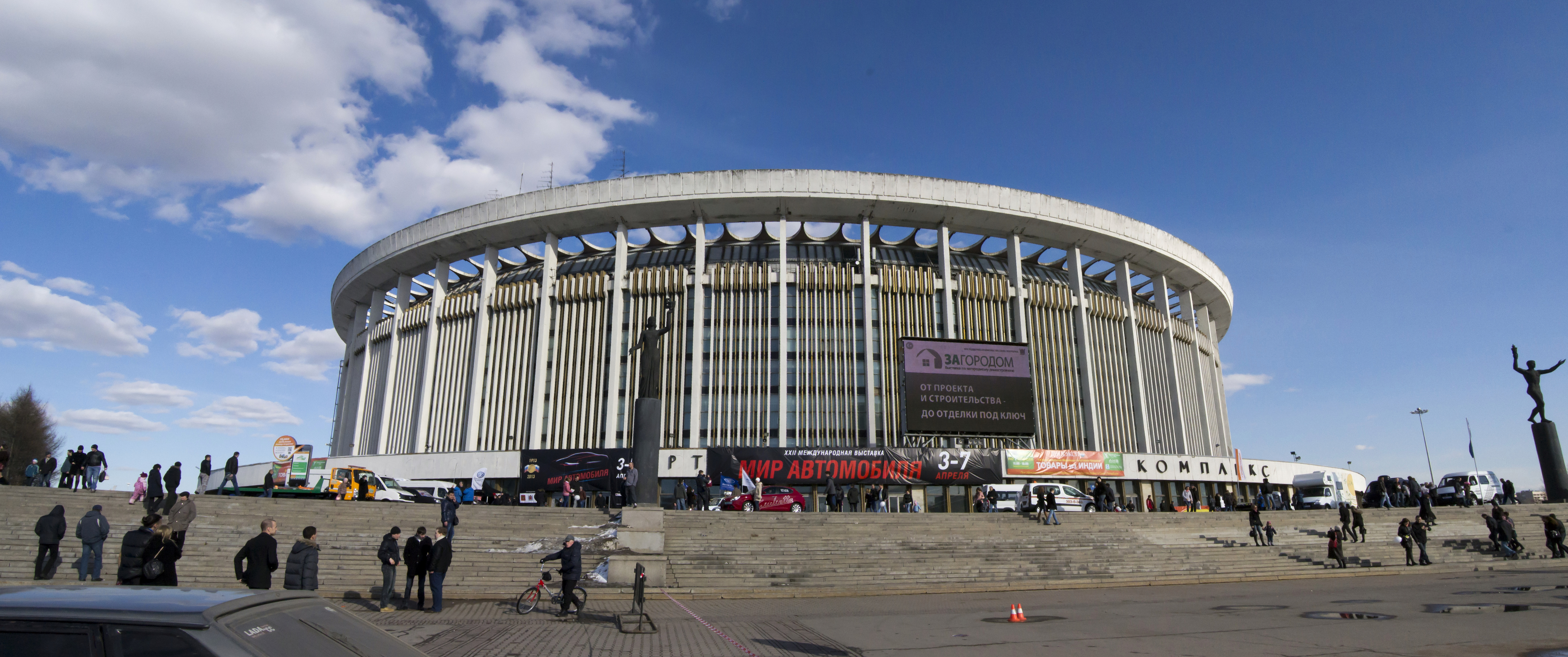
- Interactive map of Saint Petersburg Sports and Concert Complex
- Former names: V. I. Lenin Sport & Concert Complex (1980–1991)
- Location: 8, Yu. Gagarina av. Saint Petersburg 196105 Russia
- Coordinates: 59°52′09″N 30°20′31″E
- Owner: Federal State Unitary Enterprise
- Capacity: 25,000
- Public transit: M4 Prospekt Bolshevikov

Construction
- Groundbreaking: 1970
- Opened: 20 May 1980
- Closed: August 2019
- Demolished: 31 January 2020
- Architects: I. M. Chaiko; N. V. Baranov; V. F. Yakovlev; N. A. Vladislaveva; A. P. Morozov

Tenant
- St. Petersburg Open (1995–2013)

Website
- spbckk.ru

The Saint Petersburg Sports and Concert Complex (Russian: Спортивно-концертный комплекс «Петербургский», romanized: Sportivno-kontsertnyy kompleks «Peterburgskiy») was an arena in Saint Petersburg, Russia. It was closed in August 2019, and was subsequently demolished in 2020 for the construction of a new modern complex which opened in 2023.

== History ==
In the Soviet era, it was called V. I. Lenin Sport & Concert Complex (Russian: Спортивно-концертный комплекс им. В. И. Ленина, romanized: Sportivno-kontsertnyy kompleks im. V. I. Lenin). The complex was completed in 1979 and opened in 1980.

Besides concerts, the arena was used for various sports, notably tennis, as it was the location of the St. Petersburg Open. Other sports hosted at the SKK include bowling, table tennis, and fencing.

=== Demolition incident ===
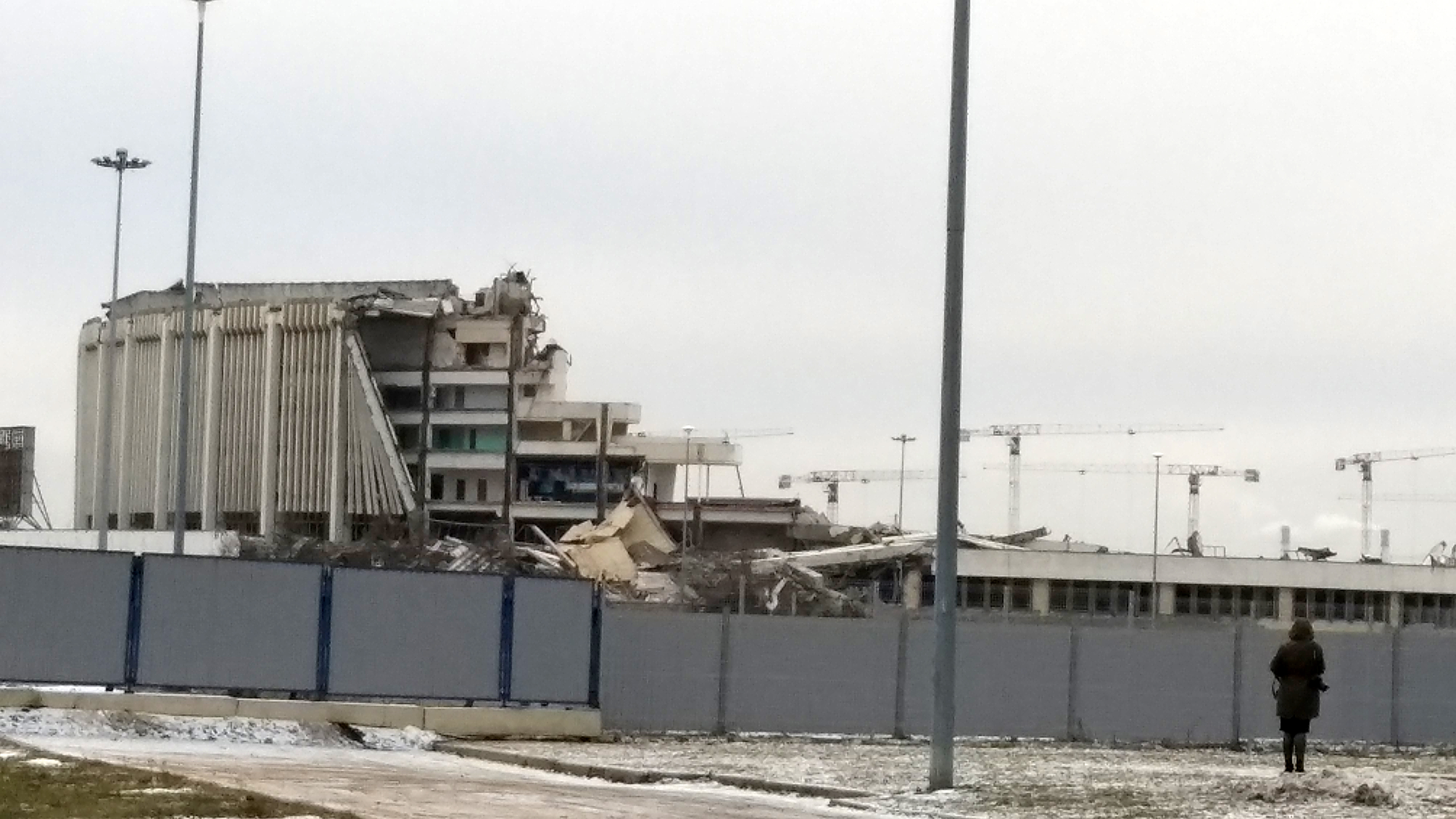
The remains of the former arena after its collapse (Commons gallery)

On 31 January 2020, the roof and a large portion of the walls collapsed during the process of dismantling. Matvey Kucherov, a 29-year-old Russian demolition worker, was killed.

Drone footage of the incident shows Kucherov using a blowtorch to dismantle a supporting girder while working on the roof without a safety harness. As the structure began to rapidly fail, Kucherov attempted to reach a safety cage suspended by a nearby crane but was unable to secure himself before the roof and approximately 80% of the stadium's walls caved in. His body was recovered by emergency responders from the debris later that evening.

The investigation highlighted severe safety violations, including workers leaving suspended safety cages to perform dangerous hot work (using a blowtorch) on the roof structure itself. During the removal of the roof membrane, workers were cutting 112 support cables, causing a "loss of balance" in the structure. The premature collapse was attributed to the improper sequencing of cutting these supporting structures.

==== Guilty verdicts, sentencing and compensation ====
On July 5, 2021, guilty outcomes were formalized by the Moscow District Court of St. Petersburg. Three managers were found guilty of violating safety rules during construction or other work that resulted in the death of a person (Article 216, Part 2 of the Russian Criminal Code). All three defendants were sentenced to two years of suspended (conditional) imprisonment with a two-year probationary period. The court initially ordered the defendants to pay roughly 900,000 rubles ($12,000 at the time) to the victim's family, though family members later filed additional civil claims for higher amounts.

== Significant events ==
Concerts
Artist(s)	Tour/Event	Date(s)	Note
Didier Marouani; Space		1–5 July 1983	
Billy Joel		2, 3, 5 August 1987	Released as Kohuept in 1987 and A Matter of Trust: The Bridge to Russia in 2014
Scorpions	Savage Amusement Tour	17–26 April 1988	
Yngwie Malmsteen	Odyssey Tour	1–10 February 1989	Released as Trial by Fire: Live in Leningrad
Mylène Farmer	Mylène Farmer en tournée	28 June 2009	
Placebo	Battle for the Sun Tour	23 September 2010	
Roger Waters	The Wall Live	25 April 2011	
Muse	The Resistance Tour	20 May 2011	
Shakira	The Sun Comes Out World Tour	24 May 2011	
Iron Maiden	The Final Frontier World Tour	10 July 2011	
Madonna	The MDNA Tour	9 August 2012	
Lady Gaga	Born This Way Ball	9 December 2012	
Justin Bieber	Believe Tour	28 April 2013	
Green Day	99 Revolutions Tour	23 June 2013	
Mylène Farmer	Timeless	4 November 2013	
Armin van Buuren	Armin Only	8 February 2014	
Depeche Mode	Delta Machine Tour	4 March 2014	
Thirty Seconds to Mars	Love, Lust, Faith and Dreams Tour	18 March 2014	
Justin Timberlake	The 20/20 Experience World Tour	15 May 2014	
Aerosmith	Global Warming Tour	27 May 2014	
Metallica	Lords of Summer Tour	25 August 2015	
Depeche Mode	Global Spirit Tour	13 July 2017; 16 February 2018	
Roger Waters	Us + Them Tour	29 August 2018	
Christina Aguilera	The X Tour	21 July 2019	
Jennifer Lopez	It's My Party Tour	11 August 2019	The last concert in SKK before demolition

== See also ==
- List of tennis stadiums by capacity
