= Vadim Zhuk =

Belarusian football referee

- Full name: Vadim Dzmitryevich Zhuk
- Born: May 20, 1952 (age 74); Mir, Belarusian SSR, Soviet Union

Domestic
Years	League	Role
1982–1991	Soviet League	Referee
1992–2002	Belarusian League	Referee

International
Years	League	Role
1987–1998	FIFA	Referee (Category 3)

Vadim Dzmitryevich Zhuk (Belarusian: Вадзім Жук; Russian: Вадим Жук; born 20 May 1952) is a former Soviet association football referee from Belarus.

Zhuk refereed the final match of 1991 Women's World Cup and the 1996 UEFA Cup Final between Bordeaux and Bayern Munich. He also worked at UEFA Euro 1996.

Zhuk was placed eighth on the IFFHS' World's Best Referee of the Year in 1995.
