= Dynamo Manage =

Sports venue in Moscow, Russia

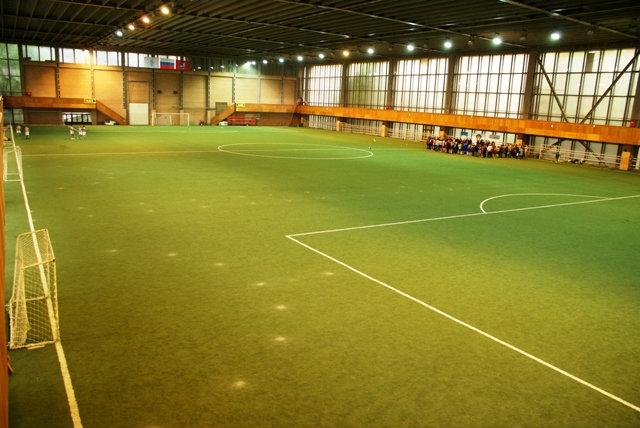
- Interactive map of Dynamo Manage
- Location: Moscow, Russia
- Coordinates: 55.791607°N 37.564291°E
- Owner: Dynamo Moscow

Tenant
- Yashin Sports school of Olympic Reserve

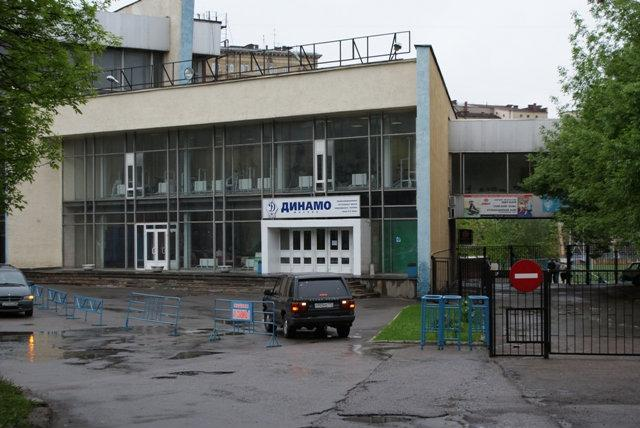
Dynamo Manage Building

Dynamo Manage is a sports venue in Moscow, Russia that is located near neighboring Dynamo Minor Arena.
