= Valentin Ivanov (footballer, born 1961) =

Russian footballer and referee

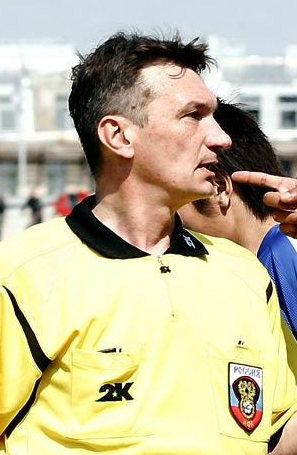
- Ivanov in 2007

Personal information
- Full name: Valentin Valentinovich Ivanov
- Date of birth: 4 July 1961 (age 65)
- Place of birth: Moscow, Russian SFSR, Soviet Union
- Height: 1.83 m (6 ft 0 in)
- Positions: Midfielder; striker

Senior career*
Years	Team	Apps	(Gls)
1979–1984	Torpedo Moscow	60	(4)
1985	Dynamo Stavropol	10	(0)
1986	Dynamo Bryansk	15	(1)
- * Club domestic league appearances and goals

Valentin Valentinovich Ivanov (Russian: Валентин Валентинович Иванов; born 4 July 1961) is a Russian former international football referee and player. The son of two Olympic champions of 1956, Valentin Ivanov and Lidiya Ivanova, he lives in Moscow where he works as a physical education teacher.

As a player, he reached the final of the Soviet Cup in 1983.

He speaks Russian and English and became an international referee on 1 January 1997. The first international game he refereed was Luxembourg–Poland in 1999. Before his qualification he served as an assistant referee and officiated 3 games in the 1994 World Cup.

He refereed the 2003 FIFA Confederations Cup, UEFA Euro 2004, and 2005 FIFA World Youth Championship.

In 2005, he officiated the World Cup qualifiers between Wales and England, and Sweden and Iceland. Both England and Sweden qualified, and were drawn in the same group in the World Cup proper. He was also selected to referee the UEFA Champions League semifinal match between Villarreal and Arsenal in 2005–06 season.

In Euro 2004, he officiated in 3 games, issuing 15 yellows and 1 red.

== 2006 World Cup ==
The 2006 FIFA World Cup was Ivanov's last major international tournament, as he reached the mandatory retirement age of 45 for FIFA referees on 4 July. In a second-round match between Portugal and the Netherlands, Ivanov issued 16 yellow cards and four red cards. The 16 cautions had matched the World Cup record set in 2002 by Spanish referee Antonio López Nieto until the 2022 quarterfinal match between the Netherlands and Argentina, when Spanish referee Antonio Mateu Lahoz surpassed the record with 18 yellow cards. The four dismissals (all on the respective players' second yellow cards) set a new World Cup record. Costinha and Deco were sent off for Portugal, while it was Khalid Boulahrouz and Giovanni van Bronckhorst for the Dutch. The Netherlands were cautioned seven times, with two players given red cards following the second yellow. Portugal saw 9 yellow cards (World Cup record for one team), and two dismissals following the second yellow as well. FIFA president Sepp Blatter later suggested that Ivanov should have given himself a yellow card for his poor performance during the match, jokingly saying that Ivanov looked "like a walking yellow card" due to his yellow jersey. Sepp Blatter regretted these words and promised to officially apologise, although he never did so.

Gerhard Mayer-Vorfelder, the president of the German Football Association also defended Ivanov, saying that Ivanov was just enforcing the rules. He noted that the match did not lack a sense of discretion on the part of the referee, but rather the teams did not follow the rules of the game. He also pointed out that FIFA gave the order to the referees to adhere to the rules firmly as far as tackling, holding jerseys and time wasting are concerned, and that this was made perfectly clear to all the teams.
