= 2021 Ýokary Liga =

Ýokary Liga
- Season: 2021
- Dates: 20 October — 19 December 2021
- Champions: Altyn Asyr
- AFC Champions League: Altyn Asyr; Ahal
- Matches: 56
- Top goalscorer: Elman Tagaýew (10 goals)
- Biggest home win: Aşgabat 5–0 FC Energetik (29 November 2021)
- Biggest away win: Aşgabat 1–3 Altyn Asyr (20 October 2021)
- Highest scoring: Şagadam 4–2 Altyn Asyr (1 November 2021)
- All statistics correct as of 19 December 2021.

The 2021 Ýokary Liga season was the 29th edition of the top tier professional Yokary Liga football annual competition in Turkmenistan administered by the Football Federation of Turkmenistan. It began on 20 October 2021 and ended in December 2021. The league champions earned a spot in 2022 AFC Champions League, and the second placed club earned a place in the 2022 AFC Cup.

FC Altyn Asyr were the defending champions from the 2020 season.

== Teams ==
A total of 8 teams are competing in the league.

Location of teams in the 2021 Ýokary Liga

Team	Location	Venue	Capacity
Ahal	Änew	Ashgabat Stadium	20,000
Altyn Asyr	Ashgabat	Büzmeýin Sport Complex	10,000
Aşgabat	Ashgabat	Nusaý Stadium	3,000
Nebitçi	Balkanabat	Balkanabat Sport Complex	10,000
Energetik	Türkmenbaşy village	Energetik Stadium	4,000
Köpetdag Aşgabat	Ashgabat	Köpetdag Stadium	26,000
Merw	Mary	Mary Sport Complex	10,000
Şagadam	Türkmenbaşy	Şagadam Stadium	5,000
Source: GSA

=== Number of teams by district ===
Rank	District Football Federations	Number	Teams
1	Ashgabat	3	FC Altyn Asyr, FC Aşgabat and Köpetdag Aşgabat
2	Mary	2	Energetik and Merw
3	Balkan	2	FC Nebitçi and FC Şagadam
4	Ahal	1	Ahal FK

=== Personnel and sponsoring ===
Source: Globalsportarchive

Team	Manager	Captain	Kit manufacturer	Sponsor
Ahal	(Turkmenistan) Begenç Garaýew	(Turkmenistan) Elman Tagaýew	(Germany) Jako	TNÖ
Altyn Asyr	(Turkmenistan) Ýazguly Hojageldiýew	(Turkmenistan) Ahmet Ataýew	(Germany) Puma	TM CELL
Aşgabat	(Turkmenistan) Said Seýidow	(Turkmenistan) Döwran Orazalyýew	(Germany) Jako	Ashgabat City Hall
Nebitçi	(Turkmenistan) Amangylyç Koçumow	(Turkmenistan) Guwanç Abylow	(Spain) Joma	Türkmennebit
Energetik	(Turkmenistan) Serdar Garajaýew	(Turkmenistan) Maksat Atagarryýew	(United States) Nike	Mary Hydroelectric Station
Köpetdag Aşgabat	(Turkmenistan) Tofik Şukurow	(Turkmenistan) Serdarmyrat Baýramow	(Italy) Kappa	Ministry of Internal Affairs
Merw	(Turkmenistan) Rahym Kurbanmämmedow	(Turkmenistan) Serdaraly Ataýew	(United States) Nike	Turkmengaz
Şagadam	(Turkmenistan) Rahmanguly Baýlyýew	(Turkmenistan) Yhlas Magtymow	(Spain) Joma	Turkmenbashi Complex of Oil Refineries

=== Managerial changes ===
Team	Outgoing manager	Manner of departure	Date of vacancy	Position in table	Incoming manager	Date of appointment
FC Merw	(Turkmenistan) Magtymguly Begenjew	Of their own accord	5 November 2021	8	(Turkmenistan) Rahym Kurbanmämmedow	6 November 2021

== League table ==
Pos	Team	Pld	W	D	L	GF	GA	GD	Pts	Qualification or relegation
1	Altyn Asyr (C, Q)	14	11	1	2	28	15	+13	34	Qualification for AFC Cup group stage (Note: Only Ahal were granted an AFC Champions League license, so other teams would be eligible for the 2022 AFC Cup.)
2	Ahal (Q)	14	8	5	1	25	11	+14	29	Qualification for AFC Champions League group stage
3	Şagadam	14	6	3	5	23	20	+3	21	
4	Köpetdag	14	5	6	3	22	18	+4	21	
5	Merw	14	4	5	5	23	21	+2	17	
6	Aşgabat	14	3	4	7	19	24	−5	13	
7	Nebitçi	14	3	4	7	8	15	−7	13	
8	Energetik	14	1	2	11	9	33	−24	5	

Updated to match(es) played on 19 December 2021. Source: TFF
Rules for classification: 1) Points; 2) Head-to-head points; 3) Head-to-head goal difference; 4) Head-to-head goals scored; 5) Goal difference; 6) Goals scored.
(C) Champion; (Q) Qualified for the phase indicated

== Fixtures and results ==
The season has kicked off on 20 October. Each team will play two matches with all other teams this season.

=== Rounds 1–14 ===
Home \ Away	AHA	ALT	ASG	ENE	KOP	MER	NEB	SAG
Ahal	—	1–2	3–1	3–1	2–2	1–0	2–0	4–0
Altyn Asyr	1–3	—	4–0	3–0	2–1	2–1	1–0	1–0
Aşgabat	1–2	1–3	—	5–0	1–2	3–1	3–0	1–1
Energetik	0–0	0–1	0–0	—	0–2	2–3	2–0	2–3
Köpetdag	1–1	1–2	2–2	4–1	—	1–1	0–0	2–1
Merw	1–1	2–2	4–0	2–0	2–2	—	1–1	1–2
Nebitçi	0–0	1–2	1–0	4–1	0–1	0–2	—	0–0
Şagadam	1–2	4–2	1–1	3–0	3–1	4–2	0–1	—

Updated to match(es) played on 19 December 2021. Source:
Legend: Blue = home team win; Yellow = draw; Red = away team win.

=== Round 1 ===
25 October 2021	Altyn Asyr	3–0	Energetik	Ashgabat
18:00	Annadurdyýew 11'; Titow 66'; Baýow 90+2'			Stadium: Ashgabat Stadium; Referee: R.Ereşow

25 October 2021	Ahal	2–0	Nebitçi	Ashgabat
15:00	Tamurkin 28'; Tagaýew 61'			Stadium: Ashgabat Stadium; Referee: A.Gurbanow

25 October 2021	Şagadam	4–2	Merw	Türkmenbaşy
16:15	Magtymow 14' 90+5'; Italmazow 82'; Amanmämmedow 90+2'		Alamow 6'; Gazakow 27'	Stadium: Şagadam Stadium; Referee: E.Ramazanow

12 November 2021	Köpetdag	2–2	Aşgabat	Ashgabat
15:30	Gurbanow 18'; Saparmämmedow 75'		Sähedow 74' (pen.); Hojamämmedow 90+1'	Stadium: Ashgabat Stadium; Referee: A.Goşşanow

=== Round 2 ===
29 October 2021	Altyn Asyr	1–3	Ahal	Ashgabat
16:30	Ataýew 55'		Tagaýew 33' (pen.) 58'; Saparov 45+3' (o.g.)	Stadium: Ashgabat Stadium; Referee: H.Rejepow

29 October 2021	Merw	2–2	Köpetdag	Mary
16:00	Gazakow 49'; Saparow 53'		Akmämmedow 10'; Saparmämmedow 42'	Stadium: Mary Sport Complex; Referee: E.Ramazanow

29 October 2021	Nebitçi	0–0	Şagadam	Balkanabat
16:15				Stadium: Balkanabat Sport Complex; Referee: G.Öwezow

29 October 2021	Energetik	0–0	Aşgabat	Mary
15:00				Stadium: Energetik Stadium; Referee: S.Gurbanow

=== Round 3 ===
1 November 2021	Ahal	3–1	Energetik	Ashgabat
15.30	Hojaýew 25'; Tamurkin 51'; Sultanow 78'		Işangulyýew 53'	Stadium: Nusaý Stadium; Referee: Çarymyrat Kurbanow

1 November 2021	Şagadam	4–2	Altyn Asyr	Türkmenbaşy
16.00	Towakelow 8' 79'; Ýakşiýew 42' (o.g.); Begjanow 90+3'		Muhadow 26'; Halmämmedow 32'	Stadium: Şagadam Stadium; Referee: J.Jumamyradow

2 November 2021	Köpetdag	0–0	Nebitçi	Ashgabat
16.00				Stadium: Ashgabat Stadium; Referee: B.Haknazarow

2 November 2021	Aşgabat	3–1	Merw	Ashgabat
15.00	Hojamämmedow 12'; Kurbanow 28'; Sähetmämmedow 90'		Alamow 9' (pen.)	Stadium: Nusaý Stadium; Referee: A.Goşşanow

=== Round 4 ===
8 November 2021	Ahal	4–0	Şagadam	Ashgabat
15.00	Tagaýew 12' (pen.) 82' (pen.); Durdyýew 38'; Gurbani 87'			Stadium: Ashgabat Stadium; Referee: R.Mämmedow

8 November 2021	Energetik	2–3	Merw	Mary
15.00	Hallyýew 42'; Muhammetberdiýew 59'		Saparow 70'; Mirsultanow 90'; Döwletmyradow 90+6'	Stadium: Energetik Stadium; Referee: A.Gurbanow

8 November 2021	Nebitçi	1–0	Aşgabat	Balkanabat
15.30	Abylow 73'			Stadium: Balkanabat Sport Complex; Referee: Alibek Sapaýew

8 November 2021	Altyn Asyr	2–1	Köpetdag	Ashgabat
16.00	Annadurdyýew 20' 36' (pen.)		Seýitmuhammedow 27'	Stadium: Büzmeýin Sport Complex; Referee: B.Haknazarow

=== Round 5 ===
20 October 2021	Aşgabat	1–3	Altyn Asyr	Ashgabat
16.00	Kurbanow 80'		Annagulyýew 10'; Saparov 35'; Annadurdyýew 66'	Stadium: Ashgabat Stadium; Referee: H.Rejepow

22 October 2021	Köpetdag	1–1	Ahal	Ashgabat
17.00	Akmämmedow 11' (pen.)		Tagaýew 17'	Stadium: Ashgabat Stadium; Referee: M.Seýitgulyýew

12 November 2021	Şagadam	3–0	Energetik	Türkmenbaşy
15.00	Paltaýew 47' (o.g.); Ýakubow 71'; Towakelow 85' (pen.)			Stadium: Şagadam Stadium; Referee: B.Allaberdiýew

12 November 2021	Merw	1–1	Nebitçi	Mary
15.00	Saparow 86'		Abylow 72'	Stadium: Mary Sport Complex; Referee: Çarymyrat Kurbanow

=== Round 6 ===
15 November 2021	Ahal	3–1	Aşgabat	Ashgabat
15.00	Amanow 68' 77'; Tagaýew 90+5' (pen.)		Orazalyýew 55'	Stadium: Ashgabat Stadium; Referee: A.Gurbanow

15 November 2021	Energetik	2–0	Nebitçi	Mary
15.00	Muhammetberdiýew 5'; Hallyýew 76' (pen.)			Stadium: Energetik Stadium; Referee: J.Jumamyradow

15 November 2021	Altyn Asyr	2–1	Merw	Ashgabat
15.00	Mirsultanow 18' (o.g.); Titow 48'		Ataýew 79'	Stadium: Büzmeýin Sport Complex; Referee: S.Gurbanow

15 November 2021	Şagadam	3–1	Köpetdag	Türkmenbaşy
15.00	Hojaberdiýew 7'; Magtymow 73'; Goşşanow 82'		Baýramow 90'	Stadium: Şagadam Stadium; Referee: Çarymyrat Kurbanow

=== Round 7 ===
19 November 2021	Aşgabat	1–1	Şagadam	Ashgabat
17.45	Sähedow 15'		Hojaberdiýew 57'	Stadium: Ashgabat Stadium; Referee: B.Allaberdiýew

19 November 2021	Nebitçi	1–2	Altyn Asyr	Balkanabat
15.00	Abdyrahmanow 23'		Baýow 27'; Muhadow 34'	Stadium: Balkanabat Sport Complex; Referee: Alibek Sapaýew

19 November 2021	Köpetdag	4–1	Energetik	Ashgabat
15.00	Gürgenow 8'; Akmämmedow 12'; Akyýew 72'; Döwletgeldiýew 90+3'		Garlyýew 55'	Stadium: Ashgabat Stadium; Referee: R.Ereşow

19 November 2021	Merw	1–1	Ahal	Mary
15.00	Saparow 88'		Amanow 3' (pen.)	Stadium: Mary Sport Complex; Referee: R.Mämmedow

=== Round 8 ===
26 November 2021	Merw	1–2	Şagadam	Mary
15.00	Alamow 53' (pen.)		Towakelow 26' 61'	Stadium: Mary Sport Complex; Referee: A.Gurbanow

26 November 2021	Nebitçi	0–0	Ahal	Balkanabat
15.30				Stadium: Balkanabat Sport Complex; Referee: B.Haknazarow

26 November 2021	Energetik	0–1	Altyn Asyr	Mary
15.00			Myratberdiýew 38'	Stadium: Energetik Stadium; Referee: J.Jumamyradow

26 November 2021	Aşgabat	1–2	Köpetdag	Ashgabat
15.00	Berdiýew 70'		Gurbanow 53'; Akyýew 65'	Stadium: Ashgabat Stadium; Referee: S.Gurbanow

=== Round 9 ===
29 November 2021	Köpetdag	1–1	Merw	Ashgabat
17.45	S.Annaýew 56' (pen.)		Alamow 35' (pen.)	Stadium: Ashgabat Stadium; Referee: Alibek Sapaýew

29 November 2021	Aşgabat	5–0	Energetik	Ashgabat
15.00	Kurbanow 18'; Sähedow 53' 60'; Hоjamämmedow 80'; Gaýlyýew 87'			Stadium: Ashgabat Stadium; Referee: Çarymyrat Kurbanow

29 November 2021	Şagadam	0–1	Nebitçi	Türkmenbaşy
15.00			Garajaýew 39' (pen.)	Stadium: Şagadam Stadium; Referee: A.Gurbanow

30 November 2021	Ahal	1–2	Altyn Asyr	Ashgabat
15.00	Tagaýew 45+2'		M.Annaýew 31'; Annadurdyýew 73'	Stadium: Ashgabat Stadium; Referee: R.Mämmedow

=== Round 10 ===
3 December 2021	Merw	4–0	Aşgabat	Mary
15.00	Alamow 21' (pen.) 59'; Gazakow 47'; Nazzyýew 90+3'			Stadium: Mary Sport Complex; Referee: A.Goşşanow

3 December 2021	Altyn Asyr	1–0	Şagadam	Ashgabat
16.00	M.Annaýew 66'			Stadium: Büzmeýin Sport Complex; Referee: Alibek Sapaýew

3 December 2021	Nebitçi	0–1	Köpetdag	Balkanabat
15.00			Akmämmedow 51'	Stadium: Balkanabat Sport Complex; Referee: R.Mämmedow

3 December 2021	Energetik	0–0	Ahal	Mary
15.00				Stadium: Energetik Stadium; Referee: B.Haknazarow

=== Round 11 ===
10 December 2021	Aşgabat	3–0	Nebitçi	Ashgabat
17.45	Sähedow 8' (pen.) 45+1' 66' (pen.)			Stadium: Ashgabat Stadium; Referee: J.Jumamyradow

10 December 2021	Şagadam	1–2	Ahal	Türkmenbaşy
14.00	Magtymow 43'		Geldiýew 8'; Tagaýew 75' (pen.)	Stadium: Şagadam Stadium; Referee: Alibek Sapaýew

10 December 2021	Merw	2–0	Energetik	Mary
15.00	Saparow 32'; Alamow 88' (pen.)			Stadium: Mary Sport Complex; Referee: R.Mämmedow

10 December 2021	Köpetdag	1–2	Altyn Asyr	Ashgabat
15.00	Akmämmedow 57'		M.Annaýew 18'; Baýow 79' (pen.)	Stadium: Köpetdag Stadium; Referee: A.Goşşanow

=== Round 12 ===
13 December 2021	Altyn Asyr	4–0	Aşgabat	Ashgabat
15.00	Ataýew 2'; Myratberdiýew 13'; Muhadow 50'; Myradow 60'			Stadium: Büzmeýin Sport Complex; Referee: J.Jumamyradow

13 December 2021	Energetik	2–3	Şagadam	Mary
15.00	Muhammetberdiýew 26'; Seýidow 63'		Hojaberdiýew 14' 60'; Aşyrow 18' (pen.)	Stadium: Energetik Stadium; Referee: B.Haknazarow

13 December 2021	Nebitçi	0–2	Merw	Balkanabat
14.00			Annamuhammedow 6'; Gazakow 47'	Stadium: Balkanabat Sport Complex; Referee: A.Goşşanow

13 December 2021	Ahal	2–2	Köpetdag	Ashgabat
15.00	Diniýew 47'; Gürgenow 90+7' (o.g.)		Gurbanow 39'; Söýünow 80' (o.g.)	Stadium: Ashgabat Stadium; Referee: B.Allaberdiýew

=== Round 13 ===
16 December 2021	Aşgabat	1–2	Ahal	Ashgabat
17.15	Amantaganow 66' (pen.)		Tagaýew 7' (pen.); Geldiýew 36'	Stadium: Ashgabat Stadium; Referee: Çarymyrat Kurbanow

16 December 2021	Köpetdag	2–1	Şagadam	Ashgabat
14.30	Akmämmedow 60'; Ş.Annaýew 87' (pen.)		Towakelow 25'	Stadium: Köpetdag Stadium; Referee: J.Jumamyradow

16 December 2021	Nebitçi	4–1	Energetik	Balkanabat
14.30	Garajaýew 2'; Garlyýew 5' (o.g.); Metdäýew 19' 42'		Hallyýew 60'	Stadium: Balkanabat Sport Complex; Referee: A.Gurbanow

16 December 2021	Merw	2–2	Altyn Asyr	Mary
14.00	Nazzyýew 88'; Gazakow 90+1'		Annadurdyýew 43'; Myradow 60'	Stadium: Mary Sport Complex; Referee: S.Gurbanow

=== Round 14 ===
19 December 2021	Altyn Asyr	1–0	Nebitçi	Ashgabat
14:00	Myradow 15'			Stadium: Büzmeýin Sport Complex; Referee: A.Gurbanow

19 December 2021	Energetik	0–2	Köpetdag	Mary
14:00			Muhammetmyradow 23'; Saparmämmedow 57'	Stadium: Energetik Stadium; Referee: S.Gurbanow

19 December 2021	Şagadam	1–1	Aşgabat	Türkmenbaşy
14:00	Hojaberdiýew 68'		Sähedow 90+5' (pen.)	Stadium: Şagadam Stadium; Referee: Alibek Sapaýew

19 December 2021	Ahal	1–0	Merw	Ashgabat
14:00	Diniýew 12'			Stadium: Ashgabat Stadium; Referee: R.Mämmedow

== Season statistics ==
=== Top scorers ===
As of 19 December 2021

Player	Club	Goals
(Turkmenistan) Elman Tagaýew	FC Ahal	10
(Turkmenistan) Gurbangeldi Sähedow	FC Aşgabat	8
(Turkmenistan) Begenç Alamow	FC Merw	7
(Turkmenistan) Altymyrat Annadurdyýew	FC Altyn Asyr	6
(Turkmenistan) Begenç Akmämmedow	Köpetdag Aşgabat	6
(Turkmenistan) Nazar Towakelow	FC Şagadam	6
(Turkmenistan) Amangeldi Saparow	FC Merw	5
(Turkmenistan) Pirmyrat Gazakow	FC Merw	5
(Turkmenistan) Kerim Hojaberdiýew	FC Şagadam	5
(Turkmenistan) Yhlas Magtymow	FC Şagadam	4

=== Own Goals ===
Player	Club	Own Goals	Against
(Turkmenistan) Şöhrat Söýünow	FC Ahal	1	Köpetdag Aşgabat
(Turkmenistan) Mekan Saparov	FC Altyn Asyr	1	FC Ahal
(Turkmenistan) Murat Ýakşiýew	FC Altyn Asyr	1	FC Şagadam
(Turkmenistan) Merdan Paltaýew	FC Energetik	1	FC Şagadam
(Turkmenistan) Garly Garlyýew	FC Energetik	1	FC Nebitçi
(Turkmenistan) Bagtyýar Gürgenow	Köpetdag Aşgabat	1	FC Ahal
(Turkmenistan) Döwletgeldi Mirsultanow	FC Merw	1	FC Altyn Asyr

== Annual awards ==
Award	Winner	Club
League Manager of the Season	(Turkmenistan) Ýazguly Hojageldiýew	Altyn Asyr FC
League Player of the Season	(Turkmenistan) Elman Tagaýew	Ahal FC

Team of the Year
Goalkeeper	(Turkmenistan) Mammet Orazmuhammedow (Altyn Asyr)			
Defenders	(Turkmenistan) Güýçmyrat Annagulyýew (Altyn Asyr)	(Turkmenistan) Mekan Saparow (Altyn Asyr)	(Turkmenistan) Abdy Bäşimow (Ahal)	(Turkmenistan) Zafar Babajanow (Altyn Asyr)
Midfielders	(Turkmenistan) Arslanmyrat Amanow (Ahal)		(Turkmenistan) Yhlas Magtymow (Şagadam)	(Turkmenistan) Ahmet Ataýew (Altyn Asyr)
Forwards	(Turkmenistan) Elman Tagaýew (Ahal)		(Turkmenistan) Altymyrat Annadurdyýew (Altyn Asyr)	(Turkmenistan) Pirmyrat Gazakow (Merw)

== See also ==
- Turkmenistan Super Cup
- Football in Turkmenistan
- 2021 Turkmenistan Football Cup
