= 2020 Ýokary Liga =

Ýokary Liga
- Season: 2020
- Dates: 6 March 2020 — 28 November 2020
- Champions: Altyn Asyr (7th title)
- AFC Cup: Altyn Asyr; Ahal
- Matches: 112
- Goals: 142 (1.27 per match)
- Top goalscorer: Altymyrat Annadurdyýew (27 goals)
- Biggest home win: Altyn Asyr 7–0 Nebitçi (12 June 2020); Şagadam 7–0 Energetik (13 June 2020)
- Biggest away win: Energetik 0–5 Ahal (7 June 2020); Energetik 2–7 Ahal (25 November 2020)
- Highest scoring: Energetik 2–7 Ahal (25 November 2020)
- Longest winning run: 6 matches Altyn Asyr
- Longest unbeaten run: 6 matches Altyn Asyr
- Longest winless run: 6 matches Energetik
- Longest losing run: 5 matches Energetik
- All statistics correct as of 13 June 2020.

2020 Ýokary Liga season was the 28th edition of the top tier professional Yokary Liga football annual competition in Turkmenistan administered by the Football Federation of Turkmenistan. edition of the top tier professional Yokary Liga football annual competition in Turkmenistan administered by the Football Federation of Turkmenistan.

Altyn Asyr were the defending champions from the 2019 season.

== Season events ==
On 23 March 2020, the league was suspended. It resumed on 19 April.

On 17 August, all tournaments under the auspices of the Football Federation of Turkmenistan were suspended again.

== Teams and clubs locations ==
In February 2020, the Turkmenistan Football Federation announced that the season would involve 8 teams, with there being 112 matches in four rounds. The teams consist of FC Altyn Asyr, FC Ashgabat, FC Ahal, FC Shagadam, FC Nebitchi, FC Energetik, FC Merw, FC Kopetdag.

Location of teams in the 2019 Ýokary Liga

Team	Location	Stadium	Capacity
Ahal FK	Änew	Ashgabat Stadium	20,000
Altyn Asyr FK	Ashgabat	Ashgabat Stadium	20,000
FC Aşgabat	Ashgabat	Ashgabat Stadium (Auxiliary field)	500
Nebitçi FT	Balkanabat	Balkanabat Sport Complex	10,000
FC Energetik	Turkmenbashi village, Mary District, Mary Region	Energetik Stadium	1,000
FK Köpetdag Aşgabat	Ashgabat	Köpetdag Stadium	26,000
Merw FK	Mary	Mary Sport Complex	10,000
Şagadam FK	Türkmenbaşy	Şagadam Stadium	5,000
Source: GSA

=== Managerial changes ===
Team	Outgoing manager	Manner of departure	Date of vacancy	Position in table	Incoming manager	Date of appointment
FC Aşgabat	(Turkmenistan) Said Seýidow	Of their own accord	25 June 2020	5	(Turkmenistan) Döwletmyrat Annaýew	25 June 2020
Nebitçi FT	(Turkmenistan) Amanmyrat Merdow	Of their own accord	18 August 2020	7	(Turkmenistan) Amangylyç Koçumow	18 August 2020
FC Ahal	(Turkmenistan) Hojaahmet Arazow	Became an assistant coach	19 August 2020	2	(Turkmenistan) Said Seýidow	19 August 2020

== Personnel, kit and sponsoring ==
Team	Head coach	Captain	Kit manufacturer	Main sponsor
FC Ahal	(Turkmenistan) Hojaahmet Arazow	(Turkmenistan) Batyr Babaýew	Nike	Türkmennebit
FC Altyn Asyr	(Turkmenistan) Ýazguly Hojageldiýew	(Turkmenistan) Zafar Babajanow	Puma	Turkmentelecom
FC Aşgabat	(Turkmenistan) Said Seýidow	(Turkmenistan) Atageldi Geldiýew	Adidas	MAN SE
Nebitçi FT	(Turkmenistan) Amanmyrat Meredow	(Turkmenistan) Azat Garajaýew	Lotto Sport Italia	
FC Energetik Mary	(Turkmenistan) Rahmanguly Baýlyýew	(Turkmenistan) Maksat Atagarryýew	Nike	Mary hydroelectric station
FK Köpetdag Aşgabat	(Turkmenistan) Tofik Şükürow	(Turkmenistan) Serdarmyrat Baýramow	Kappa	Ministry of Internal Affairs
Merw FK	(Turkmenistan) Magtymguly Begenjew	(Turkmenistan) Begenç Alamow	Nike	Turkmengaz
Şagadam FK	(Turkmenistan) Aleksandr Klimenko	(Turkmenistan) Hemra Amanmämmedow	Nike	Turkmenbashi Complex of Oil Refineries

== League table ==
Pos	Team	Pld	W	D	L	GF	GA	GD	Pts	Qualification or relegation
1	Altyn Asyr (C)	28	23	4	1	79	17	+62	73	Qualification for AFC Cup group stage
2	Ahal	28	17	4	7	54	29	+25	55	Qualification for AFC Cup group stage
3	Şagadam	28	13	8	7	46	27	+19	47	
4	Köpetdag	28	11	8	9	33	27	+6	41	
5	Aşgabat	28	10	6	12	35	45	−10	36	
6	Merw	28	8	4	16	29	45	−16	28	
7	Nebitçi	28	7	3	18	30	60	−30	24	
8	Energetik	28	3	3	22	23	79	−56	12	

Updated to match(es) played on 25 November 2020. Source: TFF
Rules for classification: 1) Points; 2) Head-to-head points; 3) Head-to-head goal difference; 4) Head-to-head goals scored; 5) Goal difference; 6) Goals scored.
(C) Champion

== Fixtures and results ==
=== Matches (1–14) ===
Home \ Away	AHA	ALT	ASG	ENE	KOP	MER	NEB	SAG
Ahal	—	1–2	5–0	2–0	0–0	3–0	2–0	2–0
Altyn Asyr	2–1	—	4–1	6–1	1–1	2–0	7–0	6–2
Aşgabat	2–4	0–1	—	1–0	0–1	1–1	5–2	1–1
Energetik	0–5	1–1	0–1	—	2–4	1–2	5–1	0–1
Köpetdag	0–1	1–2	1–1	0–0	—	3–1	1–0	1–1
Merw	3–0	0–4	0–1	1–0	0–1	—	2–0	1–2
Nebitçi	1–2	1–0	1–1	1–2	2–1	2–1	—	1–0
Şagadam	1–2	1–1	0–0	7–0	1–0	1–0	3–0 (Note: Şagadam were awarded a 3–0 win over Nebitçi)	—

Source: TFF
Legend: Blue = home team win; Yellow = draw; Red = away team win.

=== Matches (15–28) ===
Home \ Away	AHA	ALT	ASG	ENE	KOP	MER	NEB	SAG
Ahal	—	0–3	1–2	1–1	1–2	3–1	3–0	0–0
Altyn Asyr	1–1	—	7–1	6–0	1–0	3–1	2–0	4–1
Aşgabat	1–2	0–1	—	6–1	1–3	0–0	2–1	1–0
Energetik	2–7	0–2	2–1	—	1–3	0–2	1–5	0–4
Köpetdag	0–2	0–3	0–1	1–0	—	4–1	0–0	1–1
Merw	0–1	1–3	3–1	3–2	2–1	—	1–1	1–2
Nebitçi	1–2	1–2	2–3	2–1	1–3	2–0	—	2–4
Şagadam	4–0	0–2	1–0	3–0	0–0	1–1	4–0	—

Updated to match(es) played on pre-season. Source: TFF
Legend: Blue = home team win; Yellow = draw; Red = away team win.

== Season statistics ==
As of match played 28 November 2020

=== Scoring ===
==== Top scorers ====
Rank	Player	Club	Goals
1	(Turkmenistan) Altymyrat Annadurdyýew	Altyn Asyr	35
2	(Turkmenistan) Yhlas Magtymow	Şagadam	16
2	(Turkmenistan) Elman Tagaýew	Ahal	16
4	(Turkmenistan) Mihail Titow	Altyn Asyr	13
5	(Turkmenistan) Murat Ýakşiýew	Ahal	11

=== Clean sheets ===
As of last match played 28 November 2020

Rank	Player	Club	Clean sheets
1	(Turkmenistan) Batyr Babaýew	FC Ahal	11
2	(Turkmenistan) Nikita Gorbunow	FC Şagadam	10
3	(Turkmenistan) Mämmet Orazmuhammedow	FC Altyn Asyr	8

=== Best Yokary Liga 2020 Players ===
==== Best 11 ====
Position	Player	Club
GK	(Turkmenistan) Mämmet Orazmuhammedow	FC Altyn Asyr
DF	(Turkmenistan) Gurbanguly Aşyrow	FC Ahal
DF	(Turkmenistan) Zafar Babajanow	FC Altyn Asyr
DF	(Turkmenistan) Mekan Saparov	FC Altyn Asyr
DF	(Turkmenistan) Güýçmyrat Annagulyýew	FC Ahal
MF	(Turkmenistan) Nazar Towakelow	FC Aşgabat
MF	(Turkmenistan) Yhlas Magtymow	FC Şagadam
MF	(Turkmenistan) Resul Hojaýew	FC Altyn Asyr
MF	(Turkmenistan) Elman Tagaýew	FC Ahal
FW	(Turkmenistan) Mihail Titow	FC Altyn Asyr
FW	(Turkmenistan) Altymyrat Annadurdyýew	FC Altyn Asyr

==== Second Top 11 ====
Position	Player	Club
GK	(Turkmenistan) Batyr Babaýew	FC Ahal
DF	(Turkmenistan) Bahtiýar Hojaahmedow	FC Şagadam
DF	(Turkmenistan) Mowlamberdi Goşşanow	FC Kopetdag
DF	(Turkmenistan) Şirmyrat Baýramow	FC Kopetdag
DF	(Turkmenistan) Serdar Annaorazow	FC Ahal
MF	(Turkmenistan) Yhlas Saparmämmedow	FC Kopetdag
MF	(Turkmenistan) Ýazgylyç Gurbanow	FC Kopetdag
MF	(Turkmenistan) Alibek Abdurahmanow	Nebitçi FT
MF	(Turkmenistan) Ilýa Tamurkin	FC Ahal
FW	(Turkmenistan) Murat Ýakşiýew	FC Ahal
FW	(Turkmenistan) Hemra Amanmämmedow	FC Şagadam
