= 1997 Commonwealth of Independent States Cup =

CIS Cup, Кубок Содружества 1997

Tournament details
- Host country: Russia
- Dates: 25 January – 3 February 1997
- Teams: 16
- Venue: 3 (in 1 host city)

Final positions
- Champions: (Ukraine) Dynamo Kyiv (2nd title)

Tournament statistics
- Matches played: 31
- Goals scored: 123 (3.97 per match)
- Top scorer(s): (Ukraine) Andriy Shevchenko (Russia) Andrey Tikhonov (6 goals)

The 1997 Commonwealth of Independent States Cup was the fifth edition of the competition between the champions of former republics of Soviet Union. It was won by Dynamo Kyiv second time in a row.

== Participants ==
Team	Qualification	Participation
(Russia) Spartak Moscow	1996 Russian Top League champions	4th
(Ukraine) Dynamo Kyiv	1995–96 Vyshcha Liha champions	2nd
(Belarus) MPKC Mozyr	1996 Belarusian Premier League champions	1st
(Lithuania) Kareda Šiauliai	1995–96 A Lyga champions	1st
(Latvia) Skonto Riga	1996 Latvian Higher League champions	5th
(Estonia) Lantana Tallinn	1995–96 Meistriliiga champions	1st
(Moldova) Zimbru Chișinău	1995–96 Moldovan National Division champions	5th
(Georgia (country)) Dinamo Tbilisi	1995–96 Umaglesi Liga champions	5th
(Azerbaijan) Neftchi Baku	1995–96 Azerbaijan Top League champions	3rd
(Armenia) Pyunik Yerevan	1995–96 Armenian Premier League champions	2nd
(Kazakhstan) Taraz	1996 Kazakhstan Premier League champions	1st
(Uzbekistan) Navbahor Namangan	1996 Uzbek League champions	1st
(Tajikistan) Dynamo Dushanbe	1996 Tajik League champions	1st
(Kyrgyzstan) Metallurg Kadamjay	1996 Kyrgyzstan League champions	1st
(Turkmenistan) Köpetdag Aşgabat	1996 Ýokary Liga runners-up ^{1}	5th
Russia XI	Unofficial entry, not eligible to advance past group stage ^{2}	1st

- ^{1} Köpetdag Aşgabat invited as a Turkemenistan League title holders and 1996–97 season 2nd team as of the winter break. The spring part of the season was eventually cancelled and Köpetdag became a runners-up of an unfinished championship.
- ^{2} Russia XI was a non age-restricted representation of Russian Top League, bringing together candidates for the senior national team.

== Group stage ==
=== Group A ===
Team	Pld	W	D	L	GF	GA	GD	Pts
(Russia) Spartak Moscow	3	3	0	0	13	2	+11	9
(Moldova) Zimbru Chișinău	3	2	0	1	7	7	0	6
(Uzbekistan) Navbahor Namangan	3	1	0	2	5	11	−6	3
(Azerbaijan) Neftchi Baku	3	0	0	3	6	11	−5	0

==== Results ====
25 January 1997
18:00

Navbahor Namangan (Uzbekistan)	0 – 5	(Moldova) Zimbru Chișinău
		Caras 8'; Miterev 22'; Curteian 28', 57'; Suharev 71'

Spartak Manege, Moscow
Attendance: 400
Referee: Vadim Zhuk (Belarus)
25 January 1997
19:00

Spartak Moscow (Russia)	4 – 2	(Azerbaijan) Neftchi Baku
Tikhonov 19'; Golovskoy 33'; Titov 60'; Tsymbalar 68'		G.Gurbanov 12'; Rzayev 34'

CSKA Palace of Sports, Moscow
Attendance: 4,500
Referee: Romāns Lajuks (Latvia)

26 January 1997
14:00

Neftchi Baku (Azerbaijan)	1 – 2	(Moldova) Zimbru Chișinău
Rzayev 24'		Suharev 68'; Testemițanu 83' (pen.)

Spartak Manege, Moscow
Attendance: 800
Referee: Alexander Koulakov (Kazakhstan)
26 January 1997
19:00

Spartak Moscow (Russia)	3 – 0	(Uzbekistan) Navbahor Namangan
Tikhonov 28', 68'; Tsymbalar 45'

CSKA Palace of Sports, Moscow
Attendance: 4,200
Referee: Paata Dograshvili (Georgia)

28 January 1997
14:00

Navbahor Namangan (Uzbekistan)	5 – 3	(Azerbaijan) Neftchi Baku
Vinnikov 39'; Musabayev 62', 70'; Batynkov 77', 88'		Yadullayev 21', 25'; M.Gurbanov 86'

Spartak Manege, Moscow
Attendance: 500
Referee: Ihor Yarmenchuk (Ukraine)
28 January 1997
19:00

Zimbru Chișinău (Moldova)	0 – 6	(Russia) Spartak Moscow
		Tikhonov 10' (pen.); Kechinov 15', 73', 86'; Shirko 70'; Duyun 75'

CSKA Palace of Sports, Moscow
Attendance: 4,500
Referee: Oleg Timofejev (Estonia)

=== Group B ===
Team	Pld	W	D	L	GF	GA	GD	Pts
(Ukraine) Dynamo Kyiv	3	3	0	0	16	2	+14	9
(Armenia) Pyunik Yerevan	3	1	1	1	6	4	+2	4
(Lithuania) Kareda Šiauliai	3	1	1	1	8	8	0	4
(Kyrgyzstan) Metallurg Kadamjay	3	0	0	3	2	18	−16	0

==== Results ====
25 January 1997
16:00

Kareda Šiauliai (Lithuania)	2 – 2	(Armenia) Pyunik Yerevan
Vardanyan 67' (o.g.); Stukalinas 86' (pen.)		Vardanyan 14'; V.Khachatryan 30'

Spartak Manege, Moscow
Attendance: 800
Referee: A.Alimov (Tajikistan)
25 January 1997
17:00

Dynamo Kyiv (Ukraine)	9 – 1	(Kyrgyzstan) Metallurg Kadamjay
Mykhaylenko 15'; Antyukhin 33'; Byalkevich 51'; Bezhenar 52', 90'; Samoylov 55'; Shevchenko 56', 79'; Dmytrulin 78'		Khaitbayev 43'

CSKA Palace of Sports, Moscow
Attendance: 3,000
Referee: Oleg Timofejev (Estonia)

26 January 1997
16:00

Metallurg Kadamjay (Kyrgyzstan)	0 – 4	(Armenia) Pyunik Yerevan
		A.Avetisyan 1', 31', 81'; Minasyan 39' (pen.)

Spartak Manege, Moscow
Attendance: 500
Referee: Tudor Cepoi (Moldova)
26 January 1997
17:00

Dynamo Kyiv (Ukraine)	5 – 1	(Lithuania) Kareda Šiauliai
Samoylov 13', 55'; Shevchenko 71' (pen.), 86'; Antyukhin 83'		Mikalajūnas 65'

CSKA Palace of Sports, Moscow
Attendance: 1,500
Referee: B.Karaev (Turkmenistan)

28 January 1997
16:00

Kareda Šiauliai (Lithuania)	5 – 1	(Kyrgyzstan) Metallurg Kadamjay
Fomenka 7', 43'; Žvingilas 52'; Pocius 74'; Baranauskas 90'		Khaitbayev 53'

Dynamo Manage, Moscow
Attendance: 200
Referee: Paata Dograshvili (Georgia)
28 January 1997
18:30

Pyunik Yerevan (Armenia)	0 – 2	(Ukraine) Dynamo Kyiv
		Rebrov 33'; Khatskevich 90'

Dynamo Manage, Moscow
Attendance: 1,500
Referee: Alexander Koulakov (Kazakhstan)

=== Group C ===
Team	Pld	W	D	L	GF	GA	GD	Pts
(Georgia (country)) Dinamo Tbilisi	3	3	0	0	12	4	+8	9
(Estonia) Lantana Tallinn	3	2	0	1	9	5	+4	6
(Kazakhstan) Taraz	3	1	0	2	3	7	−4	3
(Tajikistan) Dynamo Dushanbe	3	0	0	3	5	13	−8	0

==== Results ====
25 January 1997
14:00

Taraz (Kazakhstan)	3 – 2	(Tajikistan) Dynamo Dushanbe
Vaganov 14'; Mazbaev 43', 55'		Fuzaylov 7'; Kamaletdinov 63'

Spartak Manege, Moscow
Attendance: 260
Referee: Algirdas Dubinskas (Lithuania)
25 January 1997
18:30

Dinamo Tbilisi (Georgia (country))	4 – 2	(Estonia) Lantana Tallinn
Didava 54'; Demetradze 59' (pen.), 69'; Kiknadze 80'		Bragin 8'; Kulikov 85'

Dynamo Manage, Moscow
Attendance: 1,000
Referee: Ihor Yarmenchuk (Ukraine)

26 January 1997
18:00

Lantana Tallinn (Estonia)	4 – 1	(Tajikistan) Dynamo Dushanbe
Bragin 6' (pen.), 47', 55'; Karin 61'		Kulbayev 86'

Spartak Manege, Moscow
Attendance: 500
Referee: Andrei Butenko (Russia)
26 January 1997
18:30

Dinamo Tbilisi (Georgia (country))	2 – 0	(Kazakhstan) Taraz
Demetradze 34'; Khomeriki 51'

Dynamo Manage, Moscow
Attendance: 3,000
Referee: Sergei Khusainov (Russia)

28 January 1997
13:30

Taraz (Kazakhstan)	0 – 3	(Estonia) Lantana Tallinn
		Daniličevas 55'; Kulikov 61'; Bragin 74' (pen.)

Dynamo Manage, Moscow
Attendance: 100
Referee: Slavik Kazaryan (Armenia)
28 January 1997
17:00

Dynamo Dushanbe (Tajikistan)	2 – 6	(Georgia (country)) Dinamo Tbilisi
Khamidov 66' (pen.); Kamaletdinov 88' (pen.)		Kerdzevadze 12'; Tskitishvili 13'; Khomeriki 38'; Kudinov 44'; Kizilashvili 57'; Kaladze 75'

CSKA Palace of Sports, Moscow
Attendance: 1,200
Referee: Romāns Lajuks (Latvia)

=== Group D ===
- Unofficial table

Team	Pld	W	D	L	GF	GA	GD	Pts
Russia XI	3	2	1	0	9	2	+7	7
(Turkmenistan) Köpetdag Aşgabat	3	2	0	1	4	4	0	6
(Latvia) Skonto Riga	3	1	1	1	2	2	0	4
(Belarus) MPKC Mozyr	3	0	0	3	3	10	−7	0

- Official table

Team	Pld	W	D	L	GF	GA	GD	Pts
(Turkmenistan) Köpetdag Aşgabat	2	2	0	0	4	0	+4	6
(Latvia) Skonto Riga	2	1	0	1	2	2	0	3
(Belarus) MPKC Mozyr	2	0	0	2	1	5	−4	0

==== Results ====
25 January 1997
13:30

Skonto Riga (Latvia)	0 – 1	(Turkmenistan) Köpetdag Aşgabat
		Gogoladze 53'

Dynamo Manage, Moscow
Attendance: 100
Referee: Slavik Kazaryan (Armenia)
25 January 1997
16:00

MPKC Mozyr (Belarus)	2 – 5	Russia XI
Maks.Romaschenko 71', 79' (pen.)		Maslov 20'; Semak 34'; Bulatov 40'; Buznikin 48', 78'

Dynamo Manage, Moscow
Attendance: 1,000
Referee: Asim Khudiev (Azerbaijan)

26 January 1997
13:30

Russia XI	4 – 0	(Turkmenistan) Köpetdag Aşgabat
D.Meredow 14' (o.g.); Buznikin 65', 84'; Silin 73'

Dynamo Manage, Moscow
Attendance: 1,500
Referee: Abdygany Radzhapov (Kyrgyzstan)
26 January 1997
16:00

MPKC Mozyr (Belarus)	1 – 2	(Latvia) Skonto Riga
Kushnir 69'		Zemļinskis 7' (pen.); Blagonadeždins 52'

Dynamo Manage, Moscow
Attendance: 1,500
Referee: Sardar Nadjafaliev (Uzbekistan)

28 January 1997
16:00

Skonto Riga (Latvia)	0 – 0	Russia XI

Spartak Manege, Moscow
Attendance: 500
Referee: A.Alimov (Tajikistan)
28 January 1997
18:00

Köpetdag Aşgabat (Turkmenistan)	3 – 0	(Belarus) MPKC Mozyr
Durdyýew 21'; Tkavadze 52'; Gogoladze 84'

Spartak Manege, Moscow
Attendance: 500
Referee: Andrei Butenko (Russia)

== Final rounds ==
Quarter-finals (29 Jan)
(Ukraine)	Dynamo Kyiv	2
(Moldova)	Zimbru Chișinău	0
(Georgia (country))	Dinamo Tbilisi	0
(Latvia)	Skonto Riga (p)	0
(Russia)	Spartak Moscow	3
(Armenia)	Pyunik Yerevan	0
(Turkmenistan)	Köpetdag Aşgabat	1
(Estonia)	Lantana Tallinn	0

Semi-finals (31 Jan)
(Ukraine)	Dynamo Kyiv (p)	0
(Latvia)	Skonto Riga	0
(Russia)	Spartak Moscow (p)	1
(Turkmenistan)	Köpetdag Aşgabat	1

Final (3 Feb)
(Ukraine)	Dynamo Kyiv	3
(Russia)	Spartak Moscow	2

=== Quarterfinals ===
29 January 1997
15:30

Köpetdag Aşgabat (Turkmenistan)	1 – 0	(Estonia) Lantana Tallinn
Agabaýew 13'

Dynamo Manage, Moscow
Attendance: 100
Referee: Sergei Khusainov (Russia)
29 January 1997
16:30

Dinamo Tbilisi (Georgia (country))	0 – 0	(Latvia) Skonto Riga
Penalties
Demetradze (penalty scored); Tskitishvili (penalty missed); Zamtaradze (penalty scored); Kizilashvili (penalty scored); Kerdzevadze (penalty missed); Kudinov (penalty scored); Kaladze (penalty missed)	4 – 5	(penalty scored) Zemļinskis; (penalty missed) Štolcers; (penalty scored) Bleidelis; (penalty missed) Chaladze; (penalty scored) Pahars; (penalty scored) Ivanovs; (penalty scored) Laizāns

CSKA Palace of Sports, Moscow
Attendance: 2,000
Referee: Vadim Zhuk (Belarus)
29 January 1997
18:00

Dynamo Kyiv (Ukraine)	2 – 0	(Moldova) Zimbru Chișinău
Byalkevich 13'; Shevchenko 89' (pen.)

Dynamo Manage, Moscow
Attendance: 1,500
Referee: Andrei Butenko (Russia)
29 January 1997
19:00

Spartak Moscow (Russia)	3 – 0	(Armenia) Pyunik Yerevan
Tikhonov 34' (pen.); Titov 49', 88'

CSKA Palace of Sports, Moscow
Attendance: 4,600
Referee: Algirdas Dubinskas (Lithuania)

=== Semifinals ===
31 January 1997
16:30

Dynamo Kyiv (Ukraine)	0 – 0	(Latvia) Skonto Riga
Penalties
Byalkevich (penalty scored); Rebrov (penalty scored); Shevchenko (penalty scored); Bezhenar (penalty scored)	4 – 1	(penalty missed) Zemļinskis; (penalty missed) Štolcers; (penalty scored) Bleidelis

CSKA Palace of Sports, Moscow
Attendance: 3,000
Referee: Andrei Butenko (Russia)
31 January 1997
19:00

Spartak Moscow (Russia)	1 – 1	(Turkmenistan) Köpetdag Aşgabat
Mir.Romaschenko 75'		Gogoladze 4'
Penalties
Alenichev (penalty missed); Titov (penalty scored); Lipko (penalty missed); Mir.Romaschenko (penalty scored); Tikhonov (penalty scored)	3 – 2	(penalty scored) Ignatow; (penalty missed) Kulyýew; (penalty missed) Durdyýew; (penalty missed) Muhadow; (penalty scored) Gogoladze

CSKA Palace of Sports, Moscow
Attendance: 3,500
Referee: Vadim Zhuk (Belarus)

=== Final ===
3 February 1997
16:00

Dynamo Kyiv (Ukraine)	3 – 2	(Russia) Spartak Moscow
Byalkevich 49', 85'; Shevchenko 51' (pen.)		Titov 21'; Tikhonov 81' (pen.)

CSKA Palace of Sports, Moscow
Attendance: 5,000
Referee: Slavik Kazaryan (Armenia)

== Top scorers ==
Rank	Player	Team	Goals
1	(Ukraine) Andriy Shevchenko	(Ukraine) Dynamo Kyiv	6
1	(Russia) Andrey Tikhonov	(Russia) Spartak Moscow	6
3	(Estonia) Sergei Bragin	(Estonia) Lantana Tallinn	5
4	(Russia) Yegor Titov	(Russia) Spartak Moscow	4
4	(Belarus) Valyantsin Byalkevich	(Ukraine) Dynamo Kyiv	4
4	(Russia) Maksim Buznikin	Russia XI	4
