= FK Arkadag in Asian football =

Overview of the FK Arkadag's role in Asian football

Arkadag in Asian football
- Club: Arkadag
- First entry: 2024–25 AFC Challenge League
- Latest entry: 2025–26 AFC Champions League Two

Arkadag is a professional football club based in Arkadag, a city located in Turkmenistan.

== History ==
=== 2024–25 season ===
After winning the 2023 Ýokary Liga, Arkadag earned a place in the AFC Champions League Two, but due to only having a license for the AFC Challenge League they entered that competition instead, with Altyn Asyr taking the place in the AFC Champions League Two playoffs. On 22 August 2024, Arkadag was drawn into the group B of the Western section of the competition, against Kuwaiti club Al-Arabi, Kyrgyz Abdysh-Ata and Maldivian Maziya. On 1 November 2024, despite a 2–3 defeat to Al-Arabi, Arkadag qualified for the knockout stages.

In their first knockout match, Arkadag travelled to Kolkata, India to face East Bengal in the quarter-finals, defeating the Indian Super League club by 1–0 on 5 March 2025. The return leg took place on 12 March 2025 at the Arkadag Stadium in Arkadag, where two late Altymyrat Annadurdyýew goals cancelled out Raphaël Messi Bouli's opener to see the Turkmen champions progress to the semi-finals. On 16 April 2025, Arkadag reached the final after defeating Al-Arabi 3–2 on aggregate. On 10 May 2025, Arkadag won the first title of the AFC Challenge League after defeating Cambodian Preah Khan Reach Svay Rieng by 2–1 at Morodok Techo National Stadium.

=== Matches ===
As of match played 4 November 2026

Season	Competition	Round	Club	Home	Away	Aggregate
2024–25	AFC Challenge League	Group B	(Kuwait) Al-Arabi	2–3		1st
2024–25	AFC Challenge League	Group B	(Kyrgyzstan) Abdysh-Ata	2–0		1st
2024–25	AFC Challenge League	Group B	(Maldives) Maziya	2–1		1st
2024–25	AFC Challenge League	Quarter-finals	(India) East Bengal	2–1	1–0	3–1
2024–25	AFC Challenge League	Semi-final	(Kuwait) Al-Arabi	0–2	3–0	3–2
2024–25	AFC Challenge League	Final	(Cambodia) Preah Khan Reach Svay Rieng	2–1		Winner
2025–26	AFC Champions League Two	Group B	(Qatar) Al-Ahli	1–1	2–2	2nd
2025–26	AFC Champions League Two	Group B	(Uzbekistan) Andijon	0–0	1–1	2nd
2025–26	AFC Champions League Two	Group B	(Bahrain) Al-Khaldiya	3–0	0–2	2nd
2025–26	AFC Champions League Two	Round of 16	(Saudi Arabia) Al-Nassr	0–1	0–1	0–2
2026–27	AFC Champions League Two	Preliminary stage	(India) Goa	3–0		
2026–27	AFC Champions League Two	Group B	(United Arab Emirates) Al-Jazira		1–2	
2026–27	AFC Champions League Two	Group B	(Iran) Gol Gohar	1–0	0–0	
2026–27	AFC Champions League Two	Group B	(Bahrain) Al-Muharraq	1–0		

== Player statistics ==
=== Appearances ===
As of match played 4 November 2026

Rank	Position	Player	Years	AFC Challenge League	AFC Champions League Two	Total
1	MF	(Turkmenistan) Ybraýym Mämmedow	2023–Present	8 (0)	13 (0)	21 (0)
2	DF	(Turkmenistan) Güýçmyrat Annagulyýew	2023–Present	8 (0)	12 (0)	20 (0)
2	DF	(Turkmenistan) Mekan Saparow	2023–Present	8 (1)	12 (2)	20 (2)
4	FW	(Turkmenistan) Didar Durdyýew	2023–Present	7 (1)	12 (1)	19 (2)
5	MF	(Turkmenistan) Yazgylyç Gurbanow	2025–Present	5 (1)	13 (1)	18 (2)
6	DF	(Turkmenistan) Abdy Bäşimow	2023–Present	8 (1)	9 (1)	17 (2)
6	MF	(Turkmenistan) Arzuwguly Sapargulýyew	2023–Present	4 (0)	13 (1)	17 (1)
8	MF	(Turkmenistan) Welmyrat Ballakow	2023–Present	6 (0)	10 (0)	16 (0)
8	MF	(Turkmenistan) Ahmet Ataýew	2025–Present	4 (0)	12 (1)	16 (1)
8	FW	(Turkmenistan) Şanazar Tirkişow	2023–Present	8 (2)	8 (0)	16 (2)
11	MF	(Turkmenistan) Mirza Beknazarow	2024–Present	8 (0)	8 (0)	15 (0)
11	DF	(Turkmenistan) Berdimyrat Rejebow	2024–Present	8 (0)	7 (0)	15 (0)
11	MF	(Turkmenistan) Şamämmet Hydyrow	2024–Present	6 (1)	9 (0)	15 (1)
14	FW	(Turkmenistan) Altymyrat Annadurdyýew	2023–Present	7 (5)	7 (0)	14 (5)
14	MF	(Turkmenistan) Begenç Akmämmedow	2023–Present	7 (2)	7 (0)	14 (2)
16	MF	(Turkmenistan) Resul Hojaýew	2023–Present	5 (0)	8 (0)	13 (0)
17	GK	(Turkmenistan) Rasul Çaryýew	2023–Present	4 (0)	8 (0)	12 (0)
18	FW	(Turkmenistan) Bayram Atayev	2025–Present	0 (0)	7 (1)	7 (1)
18	MF	(Turkmenistan) Yhlas Saparmämmedow	2023–Present	4 (0)	3 (0)	7 (0)
18	FW	(Turkmenistan) Rahman Myratberdiýew	2026–Present	0 (0)	7 (1)	7 (1)
18	FW	(Turkmenistan) Dayanch Meredov	2026–Present	0 (0)	7 (0)	7 (0)
22	GK	(Turkmenistan) Rüstem Ahallyýew	2024–Present	4 (0)	2 (0)	6 (0)
23	DF	(Turkmenistan) Meylis Diniyev	2026–Present	0 (0)	4 (1)	4 (1)
24	MF	(Turkmenistan) Arslanmyrat Amanow	2024	3 (0)	0 (0)	3 (0)
24	MF	(Turkmenistan) Kakageldi Berdiýew	2026–Present	0 (0)	3 (0)	3 (0)
26	MF	(Turkmenistan) Begmyrat Baýow	2023–2024	2 (0)	0 (0)	2 (0)
26	MF	(Turkmenistan) Ilýa Tamurkin	2023–2024	2 (0)	0 (0)	2 (0)
28	MF	(Turkmenistan) Enver Annayev	2024–Present	1 (0)	0 (0)	1 (0)
28	DF	(Turkmenistan) Ykhlas Toydzhanov	2023–Present	0 (0)	1 (0)	1 (0)
28	FW	(Turkmenistan) Gurbanmuhammet Esenov	2025–Present	0 (0)	1 (0)	1 (0)
28	DF	(Turkmenistan) Ilyas Charyyev	2025–Present	0 (0)	1 (0)	1 (0)
28	MF	(Turkmenistan) Meýlis Durdyýew	2025–Present	0 (0)	1 (0)	1 (0)

=== Goalscorers ===
As of match played 4 November 2026

	Name	Years	AFC Challenge League	AFC Champions League 2	Total	Ratio
1	(Turkmenistan) Altymyrat Annadurdyýew	2023–Present	5 (7)	0 (7)	5 (14)	0.36
2	(Turkmenistan) Mekan Saparow	2025–Present	1 (8)	2 (12)	3 (20)	0.15
3	(Turkmenistan) Begenç Akmämmedow	2023–Present	2 (7)	0 (8)	2 (15)	0.13
3	(Turkmenistan) Şanazar Tirkişow	2023–Present	2 (8)	0 (8)	2 (16)	0.13
3	(Turkmenistan) Didar Durdyýew	2023–Present	1 (7)	1 (12)	2 (19)	0.11
3	(Turkmenistan) Yazgylyç Gurbanow	2025–Present	1 (5)	1 (13)	2 (18)	0.11
3	(Turkmenistan) Abdy Bäşimow	2023–Present	1 (8)	1 (7)	2 (15)	0.13
8	(Turkmenistan) Samämmet Hydyrow	2024–Present	1 (6)	0 (9)	1 (15)	0.07
8	(Turkmenistan) Bayram Atayev	2025–Present	0 (0)	1 (7)	1 (7)	0.14
8	(Turkmenistan) Arzuwguly Sapargulýyew	2023–Present	0 (4)	1 (13)	1 (17)	0.06
8	(Turkmenistan) Rahman Myratberdiýew	2026–Present	0 (0)	1 (7)	1 (7)	0.14
8	(Turkmenistan) Meylis Diniyev	2026–Present	0 (0)	1 (4)	1 (4)	0.25
8	(Turkmenistan) Ahmet Ataýew	2025–Present	0 (4)	1 (12)	1 (16)	0.06
8	Own goal	2024–Present	0 (8)	1 (13)	1 (21)	0.05

=== Clean sheets ===
As of match played 4 November 2026

	Name	Years	AFC Challenge League	AFC Champions League Two	Total	Ratio
1	(Turkmenistan) Rüstem Ahallyýew	2024–Present	2 (4)	2 (2)	4 (6)	0.67
2	(Turkmenistan) Rasul Çaryýew	2023–Present	1 (4)	2 (8)	3 (12)	0.25
3	(Turkmenistan) Kakageldi Berdiýew	2026–Present	(-)	2 (3)	2 (3)	0.67

== Overall record ==
=== By competition ===
As of match played 4 November 2026

Competition	Pld	W	D	L	GF	GA
AFC Challenge League	8	6	0	2	14	8
AFC Champions League Two	13	4	5	4	11	10
Total	21	10	5	6	25	18

Legend: GF = Goals for. GA = Goals against. GD = Goal difference.

=== By country ===
As of match played 4 November 2026

Country	Pld	W	D	L	GF	GA	GD	Win%
Bahrain	3	2	0	1	2	2	+0	66.67
Cambodia	1	1	0	0	2	1	+1	100.00
India	3	3	0	0	6	1	+5	100.00
Iran	2	1	1	0	1	0	+1	50.00
Kuwait	3	1	0	2	5	5	+0	33.33
Kyrgyzstan	1	1	0	0	2	0	+2	100.00
Maldives	1	1	0	0	2	1	+1	100.00
Qatar	2	0	2	0	3	3	+0	0.00
Saudi Arabia	2	0	0	2	0	2	−2	0.00
United Arab Emirates	1	0	0	1	1	2	−1	0.00
Uzbekistan	2	0	2	0	1	1	+0	0.00

=== By club ===
As of match played 4 November 2026

Country	Pld	W	D	L	GF	GA	GD	Win%
(Kyrgyzstan) Abdysh-Ata	1	1	0	0	2	0	+2	100.00
(Qatar) Al Ahli	2	0	2	0	3	3	+0	0.00
(United Arab Emirates) Al Jazira	1	0	0	1	1	2	−1	0.00
(Kuwait) Al-Arabi	3	1	0	2	5	5	+0	33.33
(Bahrain) Al-Khaldiya	2	1	0	1	1	2	−1	50.00
(Bahrain) Al-Muharraq	1	1	0	0	1	0	+1	100.00
(Saudi Arabia) Al-Nassr	2	0	0	2	0	2	−2	0.00
(Uzbekistan) Andijon	2	0	2	0	1	1	+0	0.00
(India) East Bengal	2	2	0	0	3	1	+2	100.00
(India) Goa	1	1	0	0	3	0	+3	100.00
(Iran) Gol Gohar	2	1	1	0	1	0	+1	50.00
(Maldives) Maziya	1	1	0	0	2	1	+1	100.00
(Cambodia) Preah Khan Reach Svay Rieng	1	1	0	0	2	1	+1	100.00
