= Turkmenistan national under-23 football team =

Turkmenistan
- Association: Football Federation of Turkmenistan
- Confederation: AFC (Asia)
- Sub-confederation: CAFF (Central Asia)
- Head coach: (Turkmenistan) Ahmet Agamyradow
- Home stadium: Ashgabat Stadium
- FIFA code: TKM
First colours	Second colours

AFC U-23 Asian Cup
- Appearances: 1 (first in 2022)
- Best result: Quarter-finals (2022)

The Turkmenistan national U-23 football team represents Turkmenistan in international U-23 football competitions. It is controlled by the Football Association of Turkmenistan and is a member of the Asian Football Confederation. The side has never qualified for the Olympic Games.

== Tournament record ==
=== Asian Games ===
Since 2002, football at the Asian Games changes into Under-23 tournament.

Asian Games Record
Year	Round	GP	W	D	L	GS	GA
(South Korea) 2002	Group stage	3	1	0	2	4	8
(Qatar) 2006	Withdrew						
(China) 2010	Round of 16	4	1	1	2	8	8
(South Korea) 2014	Withdrew						
Total	2/4	7	2	1	4	12	16

=== AFC U-23 Championship ===
AFC U-23 Championship Record								AFC U-23 qualification Record					
Year	Round	GP	W	D	L	GF	GA	Pld	W	D	L	GF	GA
(Oman) 2013	Did not qualify							5	0	0	5	3	16
(Qatar) 2016	Withdrew							Did not participate					
(China) 2018	Did not qualify							3	0	1	2	1	5
(Thailand) 2020	Did not qualify							3	0	1	2	1	5
(Uzbekistan) 2022	Quarter-finals	4	1	1	2	4	5	3	1	0	1	3	2
(Qatar) 2024	Did not qualify							2	1	0	1	4	2
(Saudi Arabia) 2026	Did not qualify							3	2	0	1	8	3
(Japan) 2028	To be determined							To be determined					

== Current squad ==
The following players were called-up for the 2022 AFC U-23 Asian Cup, held in June 2022.

No.	Pos.	Player	Date of birth (age)	Club
1	GK	Batyr Gaýlyýew	26 February 2000 (aged 22)	(Football Federation of Turkmenistan) Ahal
16	GK	Rüstem Ahallyýew	16 November 2002 (aged 19)	(Football Federation of Turkmenistan) Ahal
22	GK	Rasul Çaryýew	30 September 1999 (aged 22)	(Football Federation of Turkmenistan) Ahal
2	DF	Yhlas Toýjanow	8 January 2001 (aged 21)	(Football Federation of Turkmenistan) Altyn Asyr
3	DF	Oraz Orazow	27 January 2002 (aged 20)	(Football Federation of Turkmenistan) Altyn Asyr
4	DF	Wepa Jumaýew	18 December 2000 (aged 21)	(Football Federation of Belarus) FC Lokomotiv Gomel
6	DF	Roman Galkin	21 September 2002 (aged 19)	(Football Federation of Turkmenistan) Köpetdag
12	DF	Ambýar Mahmudow	3 September 1999 (aged 22)	(Football Federation of Turkmenistan) Köpetdag
15	DF	Döwran Berdiýew	27 December 2000 (aged 21)	(Football Federation of Turkmenistan) Aşgabat
19	DF	Arzuwguly Sapargulýyew	28 July 2001 (aged 20)	(Football Federation of Turkmenistan) Ahal
21	DF	Begmyrat Arbatow	20 February 1999 (aged 23)	(Football Federation of Turkmenistan) Altyn Asyr
5	MF	Ruslan Tajiýew	8 July 2000 (aged 21)	(Football Federation of Turkmenistan) Altyn Asyr
8	MF	Mirza Beknazarow	15 May 2000 (aged 22)	(Football Federation of Turkmenistan) Ahal
10	MF	Meýlis Diniýew	11 July 2000 (aged 21)	(Football Federation of Turkmenistan) Ahal
14	MF	Teymur Çaryýew	26 November 2000 (aged 21)	(Football Federation of Turkmenistan) FC Energetik Mary
18	MF	Röwşen Baýlyýew	25 January 2000 (aged 22)	(Football Federation of Turkmenistan) Aşgabat
20	MF	Hojanazar Gurbanow	19 April 2002 (aged 20)	(Football Federation of Turkmenistan) Aşgabat
23	MF	Welmyrat Ballakow	4 April 1999 (aged 23)	(Football Federation of Turkmenistan) Altyn Asyr
7	FW	Rahman Myratberdiýew	31 October 2001 (aged 20)	(Football Federation of Turkmenistan) Altyn Asyr
9	FW	Begençmyrat Myradow	9 August 2001 (aged 20)	(Football Federation of Turkmenistan) Altyn Asyr
11	FW	Şamämmet Hydyrow	20 January 2001 (aged 21)	(Football Federation of Turkmenistan) Altyn Asyr
13	FW	Arslan Saparow	22 March 2003 (aged 19)	(Football Federation of Turkmenistan) Nebitçi FT
17	FW	Daýanç Meredow	15 February 2003 (aged 19)	(Football Federation of Turkmenistan) Ahal

== Coaches ==
Name	Nat.	Period
Ahmet Agamyradow	(Turkmenistan)	2017
Baýram Durdyýew	(Turkmenistan)	2019
Ahmet Agamyradow	(Turkmenistan)	December 2019
Ahmet Agamyradow	(Turkmenistan)	August 2021–present

== Previous squads ==
Asian Games squads

- Football at the 2010 Asian Games squads – Turkmenistan

Asian Cup squads

- 2022 AFC U-23 Asian Cup squads – Turkmenistan
