= Alibek =

Alibek is a masculine given name. Notable people with the name include:

- Alibek Aliev (born 1996), Russian-Swedish footballer
- Alibek Bashkaev (born 1989), Russian judoka
- Alibek Buleshev (born 1981), Kazakhstani footballer
- Alibek Delimkhanov (born 1974)
- Alibek Sapaýew (born 1987), Turkmenistan football referee

== See also ==
- Ken Alibek (born 1950), Soviet physician, microbiologist and biological warfare expert
