= 1997–98 Asian Cup Winners' Cup =

Tournament details
- Dates: 19 October 1997 – 12 April 1998
- Teams: 29

Final positions
- Champions: (Saudi Arabia) Al-Nassr (1st title)
- Runners-up: (South Korea) Suwon Samsung Bluewings
- Third place: (China) Beijing Guoan
- Fourth place: (Turkmenistan) Köpetdag Aşgabat

Tournament statistics
- Matches played: 46
- Goals scored: 171 (3.72 per match)

The 1997–98 Asian Cup Winners' Cup was the eighth edition of association football competition run by the Asian Football Confederation specifically for its members cup holders.

== First round ==
=== West Asia ===
Team 1	Agg.	Team 2	1st leg	2nd leg
Kairat Almaty (Kazakhstan)	4–2	(Tajikistan) Vakhsh Qurghonteppa	3–0	1–2
Köpetdag Aşgabat (Turkmenistan)	6–3	(Uzbekistan) Neftchi Farg'ona	4–0	2–3
Al-Shabab Al-Arabi (United Arab Emirates)	4–3^{1}	(Yemen) Al-Ahli Hudayda	2–0	2–3
Nejmeh (Lebanon)	0–3	(Qatar) Al-Ittihad	0–0	0–3
Bahrain Club	4–5	(Kuwait) Kazma	2–3	2–2
Al-Seeb (Oman)	3–4	(Iraq) Al-Shorta	3–2	0–2
Bargh Shiraz (Iran)	bye			
Al-Nassr (Saudi Arabia)	bye			
AiK Bishkek (Kyrgyzstan)	withdrew			

^{1} both matches in UAE

=== East Asia ===
Team 1	Agg.	Team 2	1st leg	2nd leg
East Bengal (India)	11–0	(Nepal) Tribhuvan	8–0	3–0
Old Benedictines (Sri Lanka)	0–8	(Bangladesh) Abahani	0–5	0–3
Beijing Guoan (China)	12–0^{1}	(Maldives) New Radiant	4–0	8–0
Instant Dict (Hong Kong)	3–6	Singapore Armed Forces	2–3	1–3
Suwon Samsung Bluewings (South Korea)	9–1	(Vietnam) Hải Quan	5–1	4–0
Royal Thai Air Force (Thailand)	2–1	(Malaysia) Melaka Telekom	0–0	2–1
Verdy Kawasaki (Japan)	bye			
PSM Makassar (Indonesia)	bye			

^{1} Both matches played in China, 1st leg at Beijing, 2nd leg at Wenzhou.

== Second round ==
=== West Asia ===
Team 1	Agg.	Team 2	1st leg	2nd leg
Kairat Almaty (Kazakhstan)	3–3(a)	(Turkmenistan) Köpetdag Aşgabat	3–1	0–2
Al-Shabab Al-Arabi (United Arab Emirates)	(w/o)^{1}	(Saudi Arabia) Al-Nassr		
Bargh Shiraz (Iran)	2–3	(Iraq) Al-Shorta	1–1	1–2
Al-Ittihad (Qatar)	1–0^{2}	(Kuwait) Kazma	1–0	0–0

^{1} Al-Shabab Al-Arabi withdrew
^{2} both matches in Qatar

=== East Asia ===
Team 1	Agg.	Team 2	1st leg	2nd leg
Royal Thai Air Force (Thailand)	1–2	(Indonesia) PSM Makassar	1–2	0–0
Singapore Armed Forces	0–8	(South Korea) Suwon Samsung Bluewings	0–2	0–6
Abahani KC (Bangladesh)	0–3	(China) Beijing Guoan	0–1	0–2
Verdy Kawasaki (Japan)	5–3	(India) East Bengal	5–2	0–1

== Quarterfinals ==
=== West Asia ===
Team 1	Agg.	Team 2	1st leg	2nd leg
Köpetdag Aşgabat (Turkmenistan)	5–1	(Iraq) Al-Shorta	4–0	1–1
Al-Nassr (Saudi Arabia)	3–2	(Qatar) Al-Ittihad	0–0	3–2

=== East Asia ===
Team 1	Agg.	Team 2	1st leg	2nd leg
Verdy Kawasaki (Japan)	0–3	(China) Beijing Guoan	0–2	0–1
PSM Makassar (Indonesia)	0–13	(South Korea) Suwon Samsung Bluewings	0–1	0–12

== Semifinals ==
10 April 1998

Al-Nassr (Saudi Arabia)	2–1	(Turkmenistan) Köpetdag Aşgabat
Mohaisen Al-Jam'an 11'; Majed Abdullah 39'		Magdiýew 79'

King Fahd International Stadium, Riyadh
Referee: Ahmad Haji Yaakub (Malaysia)
10 April 1998

Beijing Guoan (China)	0–5	(South Korea) Suwon Samsung Bluewings
		Olăroiu 36'; Lee Ki-Hyung 58'; Park Kun-Ha 73' (pen.), 84'; Cho Hyun 90'

King Fahd International Stadium, Riyadh

== Third place match ==
12 April 1998

Beijing Guoan (China)	4–1	(Turkmenistan) Köpetdag Aşgabat

King Fahd International Stadium, Riyadh

== Final ==
12 April 1998

Al-Nassr (Saudi Arabia)	1–0	(South Korea) Suwon Samsung Bluewings
Hristo Stoichkov 9'

King Fahd International Stadium, Riyadh
Referee: Qasem Hamza (Kuwait)
