= FC Kremin Kremenchuk statistics =

FC Kremin Kremenchuk is a Ukrainian sports club. This article contains historical and current statistics and records pertaining to the club.

== Recent seasons ==
=== Statistics in Ukrainian Premier League ===
- Seasons in Premier League: 6
- Best position in Premier League: 9 (2 times)
- Worst position in Premier League: 15 (2 times)
- Longest consecutive wins in Premier League: 14 (2005–06)
- Longest unbeaten run in League matches: ()
- Longest unbeaten run at home in league matches: matches ()
- Longest winning run in the League (home): matches ()
- Longest scoring run in the League: matches ()
- Longest scoring run in the League (home): matches ()
- Most goals scored in a season: 46 (1995–96)
- Most goals scored in a match: Kremin 6 - Karpaty 1 (1949–50)
- Most goals conceded in a match: Bukovyna 6 - Kremin 0 (11 October 1992)
- Most wins in a league season: 14 (1995–96)
- Most draws in a league season: 11 (1992–93)
- Most defeats in a league season: 20 (1996–97)
- Fewest wins in a league season: 4 (1992)
- Fewest draws in a league season: 3 (1996–97)
- Fewest defeats in a league season: 6 (1992)
- Most Point Before Winter Break: points ()
- Historical classification of Premier League: 19

== Players ==
=== Internationals ===
- First international for Ukraine: Ihor Zhabchenko against Belarus (28 October 1992)
- Other international players for Turkmenistan: Ýuriý Magdiýew and Muslim Agaýew
- Most international caps as a Kremin player: 1 - Ihor Zhabchenko - Ukraine
