= Kakha Gogoladze =

Georgian former footballer

Personal information
- Date of birth: 4 February 1968 (age 58)
- Place of birth: Georgian SSR, Soviet Union
- Position: Striker

Team information
- Current team: FC Dinamo Tbilisi

Senior career*
| Years | Team | Apps | (Gls) |
| 1990—1992 | FC Merani Tbilisi | 86 | (52) |
| 1992—1995 | FC Guria Lanchkhuti | 73 | (26) |
| 1995—1996 | FC Shevardeni-1906 Tbilisi | 32 | (12) |
| 1996 | FK Köpetdag Aşgabat | ? | (?) |
| 1997—1998 | FC WIT Georgia | 7 | (3) |
| 1997—1998 | FK Köpetdag Aşgabat | ? | (?) |
| 1998 | FC Nasaf | 1 | (0) |
| 1999 | FC Locomotive Tbilisi | 8 | (2) |
| 1999 | FC Yerevan | 15 | (7) |
| 1999—2000 | FC Sioni Bolnisi | 14 | (4) |
| 2000 | FC Dinamo Tbilisi | 11 | (2) |
| 2001 | FC Irtysh Pavlodar | 13 | (3) |
| 2002—2003 | Batys | 51 | (13) |
| 2003—2004 | Chikhura Sachkhere | 13 | (5) |

International career^{‡}
| 1996—2001 | Turkmenistan | 5 | (4) |
- * Club domestic league appearances and goals as of 17.02.2020 ‡ National team caps and goals as of 17.02.2020

Kakha Gogoladze (Georgian: კახა გოგოლაძე; born 4 February 1968) is a Georgian and Turkmen (since 2001) association football coach and former international player. He is currently a coach in FC Dinamo Tbilisi.

== Club career ==
He played in the Georgian clubs Merani, Guria, Shevardeni. In 1996 he left for Turkmenistan, where he played for FK Köpetdag Aşgabat. In 1998, he left Turkmenistan, but continued to play for the national team. Since 2001, he played in Kazakhstan for Irtysh Pavlodar and FC Batys.

In 2004 he returned to Georgia, where he completed his career as a player of Chikhura Sachkhere.

== National team ==
Having adopted the citizenship of Turkmenistan, he began to play for the Turkmenistan national football team. He played in the qualifying games for the World Cup 1998 and World Cup 2002. Played 5 matches and scored 4 goals.
