= Vladimir Yulygin =

Russian footballer (1936–2016)

Personal information
- Full name: Vladimir Mikhaylovich Yulygin
- Date of birth: 18 January 1936
- Place of birth: Stalinogorsk, Russian SFSR, Soviet Union
- Date of death: 26 April 2016 (aged 80)
- Place of death: Moscow, Russia
- Position: Midfielder

Senior career*
Years	Team	Apps	(Gls)
1954	FC Shakhtyor Stalinogorsk	1	(0)
1955	DOF Sevastopol	2	(0)
1958–1959	FC Torpedo Gorky	32	(4)
1960	FC Shakhtyor Stalinogorsk		
1961	FC Chornomorets Odesa	24	(4)
1962	FC Shinnik Yaroslavl		
1963	FC Dnipro Dnipropetrovsk	7	(0)
1963	FC Dniprovets Dniprodzerzhyns'k		
1964–1965	SC Tavriya Simferopol	74	(10)

Managerial career
- 1966: FC Traktor Vladimir
- 1967: SC Tavriya Simferopol
- 1968–1971: FC Motor Vladimir
- 1973–1974: FC Stroitel Ashkhabad
- 1976: FC Spartak Kostroma
- 1976–1980: FC Torpedo Vladimir
- 1984–1985: FC Lokomotiv Moscow (assistant)
- 1986: Kolkhozchi Ashkhabad
- 1989: FShM Moscow (assistant)
- 1990: FC Volgar Astrakhan (assistant)
- 1990–1992: FC Volgar Astrakhan
- 1993: FC Asmaral Moscow (assistant)
- 1993–1994: FC Dimitrovgrad
- 1994: FC Dynamo Stavropol (caretaker)
- 1995: FC Uralets Nizhny Tagil
- 1999: FC Spartak Shchyolkovo
- 2000–2002: FC Dynamo Vologda
- 2003: FC Znamya Truda Orekhovo-Zuyevo
- 2005: FC Sheksna Cherepovets (director)
- 2005: FC Presnya Moscow (director of sports)
- 2006: FC Presnya Moscow
- 2007: FC Khimki (reserves)
- 2008–2013: FC Rubin Kazan (assistant)
- * Club domestic league appearances and goals

Vladimir Mikhaylovich Yulygin (Russian: Владимир Михайлович Юлыгин; 18 January 1936 – 26 April 2016) was a Russian professional football coach and player.
