= 2018 Turkmenistan Cup =

Türkmenistanyň Kubogy 2018

Tournament details
- Country: Turkmenistan
- Dates: 27 July – 21 November
- Teams: 9

Final positions
- Champions: Köpetdag (7th title)
- Runners-up: Energetik
- AFC Cup: Köpetdag

Tournament statistics
- Matches played: 15
- Goals scored: 47 (3.13 per match)

The 2018 Turkmenistan Cup (Turkmen: Türkmenistanyň Kubogy 2018) is the 25th season of the Turkmenistan Cup knockout tournament. The cup winner qualifies for the 2019 AFC Cup.

The draw of the tournament was held on 11 July 2018.

== First round ==
=== 1st leg ===
27 July 2018	Balkan	8–0	Tedzhen
		Report

=== 2nd leg ===
30 July 2018	Tedzhen	1–2	Balkan
		Report

== Quarter-finals ==
=== 1st leg ===
7 August 2018	Aşgabat	2–2	Ahal

7 August 2018	Şagadam	1–1	Köpetdag

7 August 2018	Merw	1–1	Energetik

7 August 2018	Altyn Asyr	5–0	Balkan

=== 2nd leg ===
14 August 2018	Ahal	2–0	Aşgabat

14 August 2018	Köpetdag	1–0	Şagadam

14 August 2018	Energetik	1–0	Merw

14 August 2018	Balkan	2–3	Altyn Asyr

== Semi-finals ==
=== 1st leg ===
3 November 2018	Ahal	1–3	Köpetdag
		Report

3 November 2018	Energetik	2–2	Altyn Asyr
		Report

=== 2nd leg ===
13 November 2018	Köpetdag	2–1	Ahal
		Report

13 November 2018	Altyn Asyr	1–2	Energetik
		Report

== Final ==
21 November 2018	Köpetdag	0–0 (a.e.t.) (5–4 p)	Energetik	Köpetdag Stadium, Ashgabat
15:00		Report		Referee: Sergey Tsinkevich (Belarus)
