= Mammet Orazmuhammedow =

Turkmen footballer

Mämmet Orazmuhammedow
Personal information
- Full name: Mämmet Allaberdiýewiç Orazmuhammedow
- Date of birth: 20 December 1986 (age 39)
- Place of birth: Ashkhabad, Turkmen SSR, Soviet Union (now Ashgabat, Turkmenistan)
- Height: 1.88 m (6 ft 2 in)
- Position: Goalkeeper

Team information
- Current team: Altyn Asyr
- Number: 1

Senior career*
Years	Team	Apps	(Gls)
2005–2013	HTTU		
2014–2022	Altyn Asyr		
2025–	Altyn Asyr		

International career^{‡}
2011–2022	Turkmenistan	30	(0)

Managerial career
- 2023-2025: Altyn Asyr (assistant)
- * Club domestic league appearances and goals as of 29 July 2025 ‡ National team caps and goals as of 14 June 2022

Mammet Allaberdiyevich Orazmuhammedov (Turkmen: Mämmet Allaberdiýewiç Orazmuhammedow; born 20 December 1986) is a Turkmen footballer, who plays as a goalkeeper for FC Altyn Asyr and Turkmenistan.

He retired from professional football in 2022, before reversing his decision in 2025 after to join Altyn Asyr.

At international level, Orazmuhammedow earned 30 caps for Turkmenistan between his debut in 2011 and 2022, and was included in the nation's squad at 2019 Asian Cup.

== Club career ==
He played for FC HTTU from 2005 to 2013. As a member of HTTU, he became a two-time champion of Turkmenistan, a two-time winner of the Turkmenistan Cup, and a three-time winner of the President's Cup of Turkmenistan.

From 2014 until the end of the 2022 season, he played for the Ashgabat-based FC Altyn Asyr, serving as the team's first-choice goalkeeper throughout that period.

At the end of the 2022 season, he announced his retirement from professional football and became a goalkeeping coach at FC Altyn Asyr. As a player for Altyn Asyr, Orazmuhammedow became an eight-time champion of Turkmenistan, won the Turkmenistan Cup five times, and claimed the Turkmenistan Super Cup eight times.

In July 2025, Orazmuhammedow returned to football after 2,5 years announcing his retirement, signing for Ýokary Liga club FC Altyn Asyr a contract until the end of the 2025 season.

== International career ==
He made his debut for the national team during the 2012 AFC Challenge Cup qualification. Orazmuhammedow made his debut for the Turkmenistan national team on March 25, 2011, in a match against the Indian team (1:1), which was held as part of the AFC Challenge Cup at the Bukit Jalil stadium in Malaysia.

He subsequently became a regular feature for the team, making a total of 30 appearances for the national team between 2011 and 2022.

Orazmuhammedow was included in the final roster of the Turkmenistan national team for the final part of the 2019 Asian Cup in the UAE. He played all three matches of the group stage.

He played his last match for the national team on June 14, 2022, against Bahrain (0:1) as part of the 2023 Asian Cup qualifying tournament at the Bukit Jalil stadium in Malaysia.

== Career statistics ==
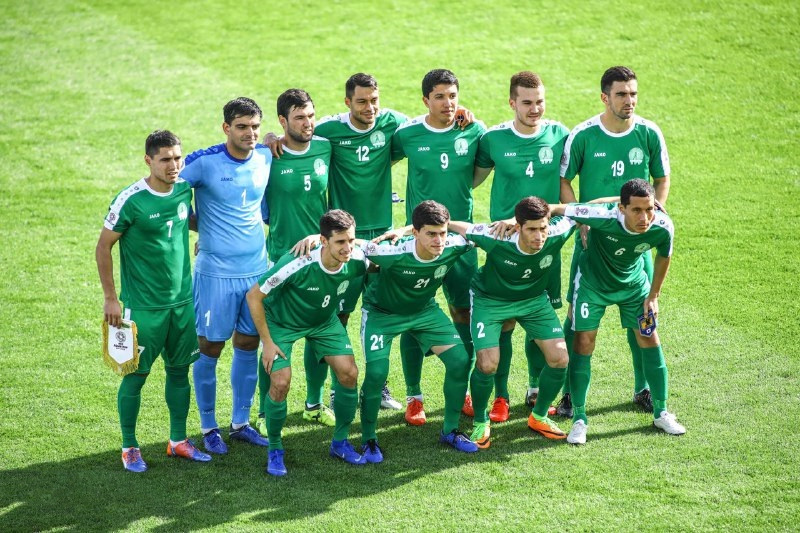
AFC Asian Cup 2019

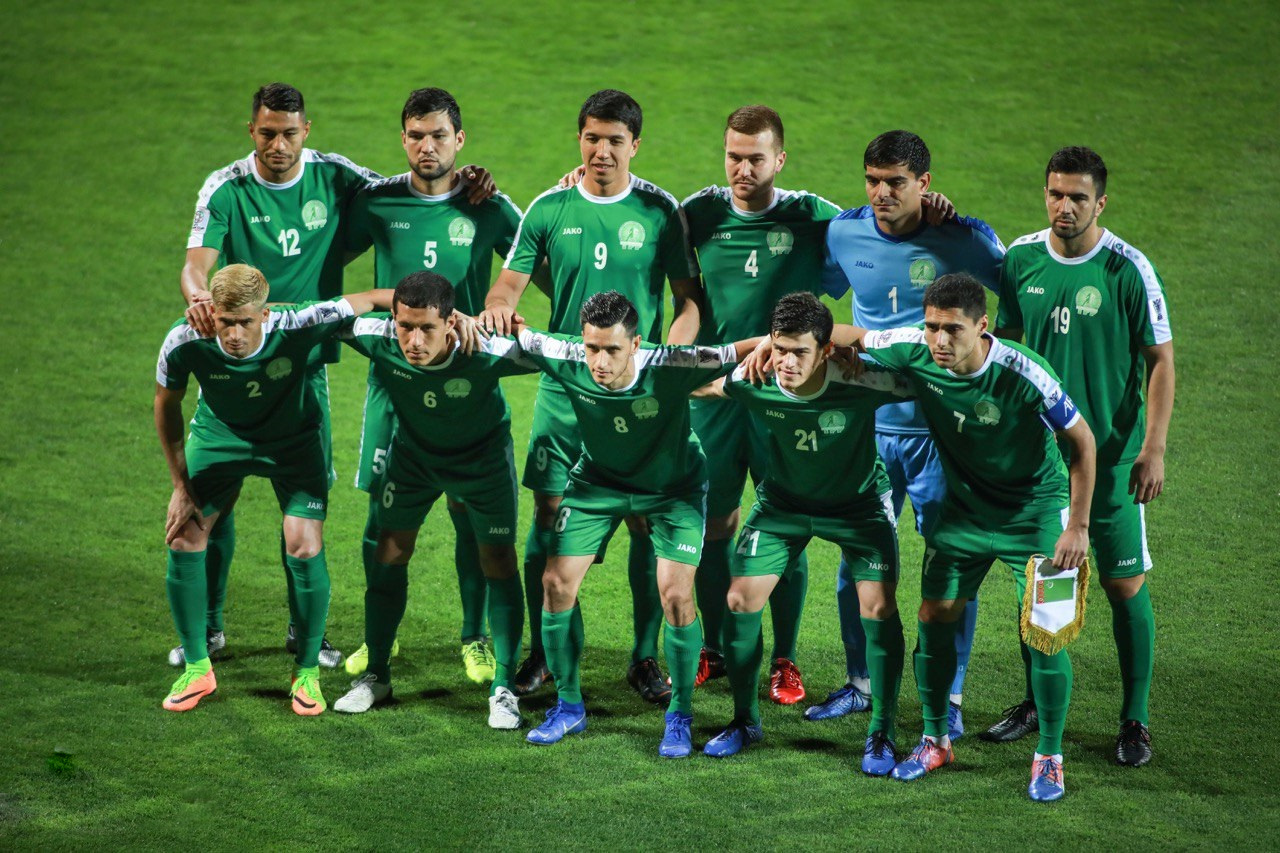
Turkmenistan & Uzbekistan Group F match, 2019 AFC Asian Cup

=== International ===
Turkmenistan national team
Year	Apps	Goals
2011	1	0
2012	0	0
2013	0	0
2014	0	0
2015	5	0
2016	3	0
2017	5	0
2018	2	0
2019	9	0
2020	0	0
2021	0	0
2022	3	0
Total	28	0

Statistics accurate as of match played 14 June 2022

== Honours ==
Altyn Asyr

- Ýokary Liga (8): 2014, 2015, 2016, 2017, 2018, 2019, 2020, 2021
- Turkmenistan Cup (4): 2015, 2016, 2019, 2020
- Turkmenistan Super Cup (8): 2015, 2016, 2017, 2018, 2019, 2020, 2021,2022

HTTU

- Ýokary Liga (2): 2006, 2009
- Turkmenistan Cup (2): 2006, 2011
- Turkmenistan Super Cup (2): 2009, 2012
- Turkmenistan President's Cup (3): 2007, 2008, 2009
