= Döwletmyrat Seýitmuhammedow =

Turkmen association football player

Personal information
- Full name: Döwletmyrat Geldimyradowiç Seýitmuhammedow
- Date of birth: 3 December 1997 (age 28)
- Place of birth: Babadaýhan, Ahal Region, Turkmenistan
- Position: Midfielder

Team information
- Current team: Köpetdag

Senior career*
Years	Team	Apps	(Gls)
2017–	Köpetdag		

International career^{‡}
2019–	Turkmenistan	1	(0)
- * Club domestic league appearances and goals ‡ National team caps and goals as of 1 September 2019

Dovletmyrat Seyitmuhammedov (3 December 1996) is a Turkmen professional footballer who plays for FC Kopetdag and Turkmenistan as midfielder.

== Club career ==
In recent years he has been playing for the FC Kopetdag Ashgabat.

== International career ==
Seyitmuhammedov received his debut call to the Turkmenistan national football team in May 2019: three FC Kopetdag players for the first time in the club's recent history were called up by the Croatian coach Ante Miše to join the national team.

9 June 2019 Seyitmuhammedov made his senior debut for Turkmenistan against Uganda, he came on as a substitute in the second half, replacing captain Arslanmyrat Amanov.

== Honours ==
- Turkmenistan Cup (1)
  - Winner : 2018
- Turkmenistan Super Cup
  - Finalist : 2019
