= Said Seýidow =

Soviet footballer and Turkmen coach

Personal information
- Full name: Said Ýusupowiç Seýidow
- Date of birth: 22 January 1962 (age 64)
- Place of birth: Ashgabat, USSR
- Position: Midfielder

Senior career*
Years	Team	Apps	(Gls)
1980–1982	Kolkhozchi		
1982	Zvezda Jizzakh	1	(0)
1983–1984	Kolkhozchi	43	(4)
1986	Kolkhozchi	22	(1)
1989	Ahal	39	(13)
1990	Köpetdag	20	(3)
1991	Sogdiana Jizzakh	25	(3)
1991	Ahal	17	(0)
1992–1993	Nebitçi	?	
1994–1995	Nisa	?	
1995	Turan Daşoguz	?	
2000	Nisa	?	

Managerial career
- 1996–1998: FC Büzmeýin
- 1999–2000: FC Galkan (assistant)
- 2000–2004: Nisa (assistant)
- 2005–2006: Navbahor Namangan (assistant)
- 2006: Shurtan (assistant)
- 2007–2010: FK Mash'al Mubarek Academy
- 2010: Nasaf (assistant)
- 2011–2012: Shurtan
- 2014: FK Buxoro (caretaker)
- 2015–2019: Köpetdag
- 2019–2020: Aşgabat FK
- 2020: Ahal
- 2022: Turkmenistan
- * Club domestic league appearances and goals

Said Yusupovich Seyidov (Russian: Саид Юсупович Сеидов; Turkmen: Said Ýusupowiç Seýidow; born 22 January 1962) is a Turkmen football coach and a former Soviet footballer.

== Playing career ==
Seýidow was born in Ashgabat. He started his career in the FC Kolkhozchi Ashgabat. Then he played for Zvezda Jizzakh, the club from the Uzbek SSR, as well as for clubs from the Turkmen SSR: FC Köpetdag, FC Ahal, FC Nebitçi, FC Nisa and FC Turan. For most of his soccer career he played as a midfielder.

== Managing career ==
In 1996-1998 he was the head coach of FC Buzmeyin.

In 2005-2006 he worked as coach at Uzbek club FC Navbahor Namangan

In 2006 he was assistant coach of FC Shurtan (Guzar, Uzbekistan)

In 2007-2010 he worked at the Academy of FC Mashal (Mubarek, Uzbekistan)

In 2010 he coached the reserve team of FC Nasaf (Karshi, Uzbekistan)

In 2011-2012 he coached FC Shurtan (Guzar, Uzbekistan)

In 2014 he was caretaker of FC Bukhara (Uzbekistan)

For four years he worked as the head coach of FK Köpetdag Aşgabat in the period 2015-2019. In his first year at the club, the team won the First league of Turkmenistan and got promoted to the Ýokary Liga. Under his leadership, FС Köpetdag won the 2018 Turkmenistan Cup.

On 6 August 2019, Seýidow was appointed manager of FC Ashgabat. In July 2020, he left the club by mutual consent.

On 19 August 2020, he signed a contract with Ýokary Liga club FC Ahal.

On 31 March 2022, Seýidow became the manager of Turkmenistan national team, even though his term as national team coach lasted just a couple of months.

== Honours ==
FK Köpetdag Aşgabat

- Turkmenistan First League (1): 2015
- Turkmenistan Cup (1): 2018
