= Roin Kerdzevadze =

Georgian footballer

Personal information
- Date of birth: 26 September 1970
- Date of death: 2010 (aged 39–40)
- Position: Midfielder

Senior career*
| Years | Team | Apps | (Gls) |
| 1988–1990 | FC Dinamo Tbilisi | | |
| 1991–1993 | FC Margveti Zestaponi | | |
| 1994–1995 | Omonia Aradippou | | |
| 1995–1998 | FC Dinamo Tbilisi | | |
| 1998–2000 | Kapaz PFK | | |
- * Club domestic league appearances and goals

Roin Kerdzevadze (Georgian: როინ კერძევაძე; born 26 September 1970 – February 2010) was a Georgian football midfielder.
