= Begençmyrat Myradow =

Turkmenistan footballer

Personal information
- Full name: Begençmyrat Bekmyradowiç Myradow
- Date of birth: 9 August 2001 (age 25)
- Place of birth: Ashgabat, Turkmenistan
- Positions: Midfielder; forward

Team information
- Current team: Altyn Asyr
- Number: 9

Youth career
- –2019: Altyn Asyr

Senior career*
Years	Team	Apps	(Gls)
2019–	Altyn Asyr	12	(2)

International career^{‡}
2021–	Turkmenistan	2	(0)
- * Club domestic league appearances and goals as of 14:25, 6 July 2021 (UTC) ‡ National team caps and goals as of 14:25, 6 July 2021 (UTC)

Begençmyrat Myradow (born 9 August 2001) is a Turkmenistani footballer who plays as a striker for Altyn Asyr FK of the Ýokary Liga, and the Turkmenistan national team.

== Club career ==
Myradow was promoted to the first team of Altyn Asyr in 2019 but continued to play with the reserve team through 2020. He made two appearances for the club in the 2021 AFC Cup, coming on as a second-half substitute against FC Alay of Kyrgyzstan and FC Nasaf of Uzbekistan.

== International career ==
In 2019 Myradow was named to Turkmenistan's squad for 2020 AFC U-19 Championship qualification. In preparation for the tournament, Turkmenistan held a training camp in Turkey. In a friendly against the youth team of Fenerbahçe S.K., Myradow scored a goal in the eventual 1–1 draw. In the group stage he scored in a 1–4 defeat to Qatar and a 4–2 victory over Sri Lanka. In August 2021 he was named to the national under-23 team and scored a brace in a friendly against FC Aşgabat.

He made his senior international debut on 5 June 2021 in a 2022 FIFA World Cup qualification match against South Korea.

=== International ===
As of match played June 9, 2021.

National team	Year	Apps	Goals
Turkmenistan	2021	2	0
Total		2	0
