= Ýuriý Magdiýew =

Turkmenistani footballer

Yuri Magdiýew
Personal information
- Full name: Yuri Zagirbekovich Magdiýew
- Date of birth: 2 December 1971 (age 54)
- Place of birth: Ashgabat, Turkmen SSR
- Height: 1.86 m (6 ft 1 in)
- Position: Midfielder

Senior career*
Years	Team	Apps	(Gls)
1994–1998	Köpetdag Aşgabat		
1999	Kremin Kremenchuk	17	(1)
1999	Nyva Ternopil	11	(3)
2000–2001	Köpetdag Aşgabat		
2001–2003	Kristall Smolensk	51	(1)
2003	Sodovik Sterlitamak	17	(0)
2004	Darida Minsk Raion	11	(0)
2004	Taraz	16	(0)
2005	Mika	16	(1)

International career
1994–2001	Turkmenistan		

Managerial career
- 2008–2009: FSA Voronezh
- 2011–2012: Dagdizel Kaspiysk
- * Club domestic league appearances and goals as of 1 January 2009

Yuri Zagirbekovich Magdiýew (Russian: Юрий Загирбекович Магдиев; born 2 December 1971) is a Turkmenistani professional football coach and a former player who is currently a coach at Dagestan Kaspiysk football school. As a player, he made his debut in the Russian First Division in 2001 for FC Kristall Smolensk.

== International goals ==
#	Date	Venue	Opponent	Score	Result	Competition
.	25 April 1997	Nisa-Çandybil Stadium, Ashgabat, Turkmenistan	Azerbaijan	2–0	2–0	Friendly
