= Alibek Delimkhanov =

Russian politician

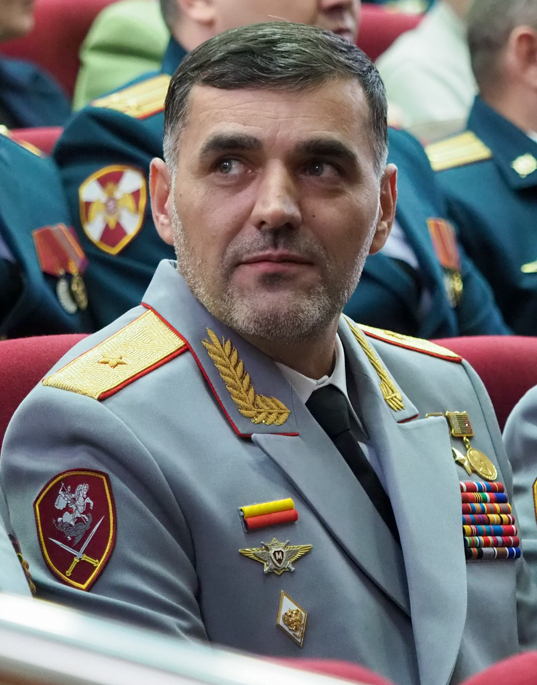
In March 2019

Alibek Sultanovich Delimkhanov (Russian: Алибе́к Султа́нович Делимха́нов; born October 16, 1974) is a Russian Colonel-General, military commander of the Russian National Guard North Caucasus District, Hero of Russian Federation.

== Sanctions ==
Sanctioned by Canada under the Special Economic Measures Act (S.C. 1992, c. 17) in relation to the Russian invasion of Ukraine for Grave Breach of International Peace and Security and in July 2022 the EU imposed sanctions on Alibek Delimkhanov in relation to the 2022 Russian invasion of Ukraine.

== See also ==
- List of Heroes of the Russian Federation
