= Alexandru Suharev =

Moldovan association football player

Personal information
- Date of birth: 3 July 1970 (age 56)
- Place of birth: Balta, Ukrainian SSR
- Height: 1.80 m (5 ft 11 in)
- Position: Forward

Youth career
- FC Chornomorets Odesa

Senior career*
Years	Team	Apps	(Gls)
1993–1995	FC Olimpia Bălți	39	(12)
1995–1997	FC Zimbru Chișinău	52	(16)
1997	FC Alania Vladikavkaz	3	(0)
1998–1999	FC Dnipro Dnipropetrovsk	39	(5)
1998–1999	→ FC Dnipro-2 Dnipropetrovsk (loans)	5	(0)
1999–2000	Maccabi Jerusalem F.C.		
2000–2001	Maccabi Ironi Kiryat Ata F.C.		
2001–2002	Bnei Sakhnin F.C.		
2002	FC Balta		
2002–2003	FC Ivan Odesa		
2003	FC Lokomotiv Chita	35	(7)
2004–2005	FC Ordabasy	13	(2)
2012	FC Tarutine		

International career
1995–1999	Moldova	16	(1)
- * Club domestic league appearances and goals

Alexandru Suharev (Ukrainian: Олександр Анатолійович Сухарєв; born 3 July 1970) is a former Moldovan football player.

== International goal ==
Scores and results list Moldova's goal tally first.

No	Date	Venue	Opponent	Score	Result	Competition
1.	10 March 1999	Ta' Qali Stadium, Ta' Qali, Malta	Malta	2–0	2–0	Friendly match

== Honours ==
Olimpia Bălți

- Moldovan National Division bronze: 1994–95

Zimbru Chișinău

- Moldovan National Division champion: 1995–96
- Moldovan National Division silver: 1996–97
