= Dmitri Batynkov =

Russian footballer

Personal information
- Full name: Dmitri Viktorovich Batynkov
- Date of birth: 7 May 1970 (age 56)
- Place of birth: Moscow, Russian SFSR
- Height: 1.70 m (5 ft 7 in)
- Position: Midfielder

Senior career*
Years	Team	Apps	(Gls)
1987	FC Torpedo Moscow (reserves)	?	(1)
1988–1991	FC Dynamo-2 Moscow	69	(7)
1991	FC Dynamo Moscow	1	(0)
1992	FC Dynamo-d Moscow	23	(4)
1993–1994	FC Dynamo Stavropol	31	(0)
1995	FC Shinnik Yaroslavl	2	(0)
1995–1998	Navbahor Namangan	72	(13)
1998–2000	FC Avtomobilist Noginsk	96	(19)
2001–2003	FC Severstal Cherepovets	67	(13)
2003–2004	FC Vidnoye	30	(4)
2004–2005	FC Reutov	34	(4)
- * Club domestic league appearances and goals

Dmitri Viktorovich Batynkov (Russian: Дмитрий Викторович Батынков; born 7 May 1970) is a former Russian professional footballer.

== Playing career ==
He made his debut in the Soviet Top League in 1991 for FC Dynamo Moscow.

== Honours ==
- Uzbek League bronze: 1998.
