= Levan Tskitishvili =

Georgian footballer

Personal information
- Date of birth: 10 October 1976 (age 50)
- Place of birth: Tbilisi, Georgia
- Height: 1.86 m (6 ft 1 in)
- Position: Midfielder

Youth career
- –1994: Dinamo Tbilisi

Senior career*
Years	Team	Apps	(Gls)
1993–1998	Dinamo Tbilisi	120	(32)
1998–2005	SC Freiburg	141	(9)
2005	Metalurh Donetsk	3	(0)
2005–2006	VfL Wolfsburg	15	(0)
2006–2007	Panionios	20	(2)
2007–2008	Lokomotive Tbilisi	20	(7)
2009	Wehen Wiesbaden	3	(0)
Total		322	(50)

International career
1996–1997	Georgia U21	6	(1)
1995–2009	Georgia	58	(1)
- * Club domestic league appearances and goals

Levan Tskitishvili (Georgian: ლევან ცქიტიშვილი; born 10 October 1976) is a Georgian former professional footballer who played as a midfielder.

== Career ==
Born in Tbilisi, Tskitishvili started playing for Dinamo Tbilisi in 1994, and in 1998 he was transferred to SC Freiburg, teaming up with other Georgian players. During his time with Freiburg the midfielder Tskitishvili played 111 Bundesliga games. Following the relegation of SC Freiburg in 2005 he was on the verge of signing for Metalurg Donetsk, but instead he accepted a contract with VfL Wolfsburg. He joined SV Wehen Wiesbaden on 1 February 2009, signed a contract until 30 June 2010, but left the club the 2008–09 season. He played 33 games in the 2. Bundesliga.

== International ==
Tskitishvili was capped 56 times and scored one goal for the Georgia national team. He captained the Georgia side in a 2–0 defeat by Italy.
