= Rahman Myratberdiýew =

Turkmen footballer (born 2001)

Personal information
- Full name: Rahman Orazmyrat ogly Myratberdiýew
- Date of birth: 31 October 2001 (age 25)
- Place of birth: Gökdepe, Turkmenistan
- Height: 1.87 m (6 ft 2 in)
- Position: Striker

Team information
- Current team: Arkadag
- Number: 9

Youth career
- –2020: Altyn Asyr

Senior career*
Years	Team	Apps	(Gls)
2020–2025	Altyn Asyr		
2026–	Arkadag		

International career^{‡}
2019	Turkmenistan U21	6	(3)
2021–	Turkmenistan	7	(1)
- * Club domestic league appearances and goals ‡ National team caps and goals as of 18 November 2025

Rahman Myratberdiýew (born 31 October 2001) is a Turkmen professional footballer who plays as a striker for Arkadag of the Ýokary Liga and the Turkmenistan national team.

== Club career ==
Myratberdiýew competed in the 2021 AFC Cup with Altyn Asyr FK, making appearances against FC Alay of Kyrgyzstan and FC Nasaf of Uzbekistan.

== International career ==
Myratberdiýew represented Turkmenistan in 2020 AFC U-19 Championship qualification. He scored two goals in the campaign, one against Qatar and another against Sri Lanka. The same year he competed in the 2019 CAFA Under-19 Championship, scoring one goal in three matches. His goal came in a 1–5 defeat to Tajikistan.

Myratberdiýew made his senior international debut on 5 June 2021 in a 2022 FIFA World Cup qualification match against South Korea.

== Career statistics ==
=== Club ===
As of 6 July 2021

Club	Season	League			Cup		Continental		Total	
Club	Season	Division	Apps	Goals	Apps	Goals	Apps	Goals	Apps	Goals
Altyn Asyr	2020	I	7	2	2	0	0	0	9	2
Altyn Asyr	2021	I	0	0	0	0	2	0	2	0
Total			7	2	2	0	2	0	11	2
Career total			7	2	2	0	2	0	11	2

=== International ===
As of match played November 18, 2025.

National team	Year	Apps	Goals
Turkmenistan	2021	2	0
Turkmenistan	2025	5	1
Total		7	1

=== International goals ===
#	Date	Venue	Opponent	Score	Result	Competition
1.	18 November 2025	Arkadag Stadium, Arkadag, Turkmenistan	Chinese Taipei	1–0	3–1	2027 AFC Asian Cup qualification
