= Döwletgeldi Mirsultanow =

Turkmen footballer

Personal information
- Full name: Döwletgeldi Şirgeldiýewiç Mirsultanow
- Date of birth: 29 May 1995 (age 31)
- Place of birth: Mary, Mary Region, Turkmenistan
- Position: Defender

Team information
- Current team: FC Energetik

Senior career*
Years	Team	Apps	(Gls)
2016	Merw	?	(?)
2017	Altyn Asyr	?	(?)
2018	Nebitçi		
2018	Merw		
2019-	Energetik		

International career^{‡}
2018–	Turkmenistan	1	(0)
- * Club domestic league appearances and goals as of 11 April 2019 ‡ National team caps and goals as of 11 April 2019

Dovletgeldi Shirgeldiyevich Mirsultanov (Turkmen: Döwletgeldi Şirgeldiýewiç Mirsultanow; born 29 May 1995) is a Turkmen footballer who plays for Turkmen club FC Energetik. He was part of the Turkmenistan national team from 2018.

== International career ==
He appeared with the Turkmenistan U22 football team at 2018 AFC U-23 Championship qualification.

Annasähedow made his senior national team debut on 27 March 2018, in a 2019 AFC Asian Cup qualification – third round match against Bahrain.
