= Batyr Babaýew =

Turkmen footballer

Personal information
- Date of birth: August 21, 1991 (age 35)
- Place of birth: Kyzyl-Arvat, Turkmen SSR, Soviet Union (now Serdar, Balkan Region Turkmenistan)
- Position: Goalkeeper

Team information
- Current team: Ahal
- Number: 1

Senior career*
Years	Team	Apps	(Gls)
2013–2020	Ahal		
2021–	Nebitçi		

International career^{‡}
2012–2013	Turkmenistan U-21	3	(0)
2019–	Turkmenistan	1	(0)
- * Club domestic league appearances and goals as of 13 November 2019 ‡ National team caps and goals as of 13 November 2019

Batyr Hajyýewiç Babaýew (born August 21, 1991) is a Turkmen footballer, who plays as a goalkeeper for Nebitçi FC and the Turkmenistan national team.

== Club career ==
In recent years he has been playing for the FC Ahal.

On 2021, he signed a contract with Nebitçi Balkanabat.

== International career ==
He made his debut for the Turkmenistan national team during friendly match against Kuwait in October 2019. He was included in Turkmenistan's squad for the 2019 AFC Asian Cup in the United Arab Emirates.
