= Döwran Orazalyýew =

Turkmen association football player

Personal information
- Full name: Döwran Ýediýewiç Orazalyýew
- Date of birth: 14 October 1993 (age 33)
- Place of birth: Aşgabat, Turkmenistan
- Height: 1.75 m (5 ft 9 in)
- Position: Midfielder

Team information
- Current team: Ashgabat

Senior career*
Years	Team	Apps	(Gls)
2012–2017	Altyn Asyr		
2017–2020	Ahal		(1)
2020–	Ashgabat	0	(0)

International career^{‡}
2012–2019	Turkmenistan	1	(0)
- * Club domestic league appearances and goals ‡ National team caps and goals as of 27 January 2020

Döwran Orazalyýew (14 Oktober 1993) is a Turkmen professional footballer who plays for FC Ashgabat and Turkmenistan as midfielder.

== International career ==
Orazalyýew made his senior debut for Turkmenistan against Romania on 27 January 2012. He was included in Turkmenistan's squad for the 2019 AFC Asian Cup in the United Arab Emirates.

== Career statistics ==
=== International ===
Statistics accurate as of match played 27 January 2012

Turkmenistan national team
Year	Apps	Goals
2012	1	0
Total	1	0
