= Zafar Babajanow =

Turkmenistani footballer

Zafar Yuldoshevich Babajanow
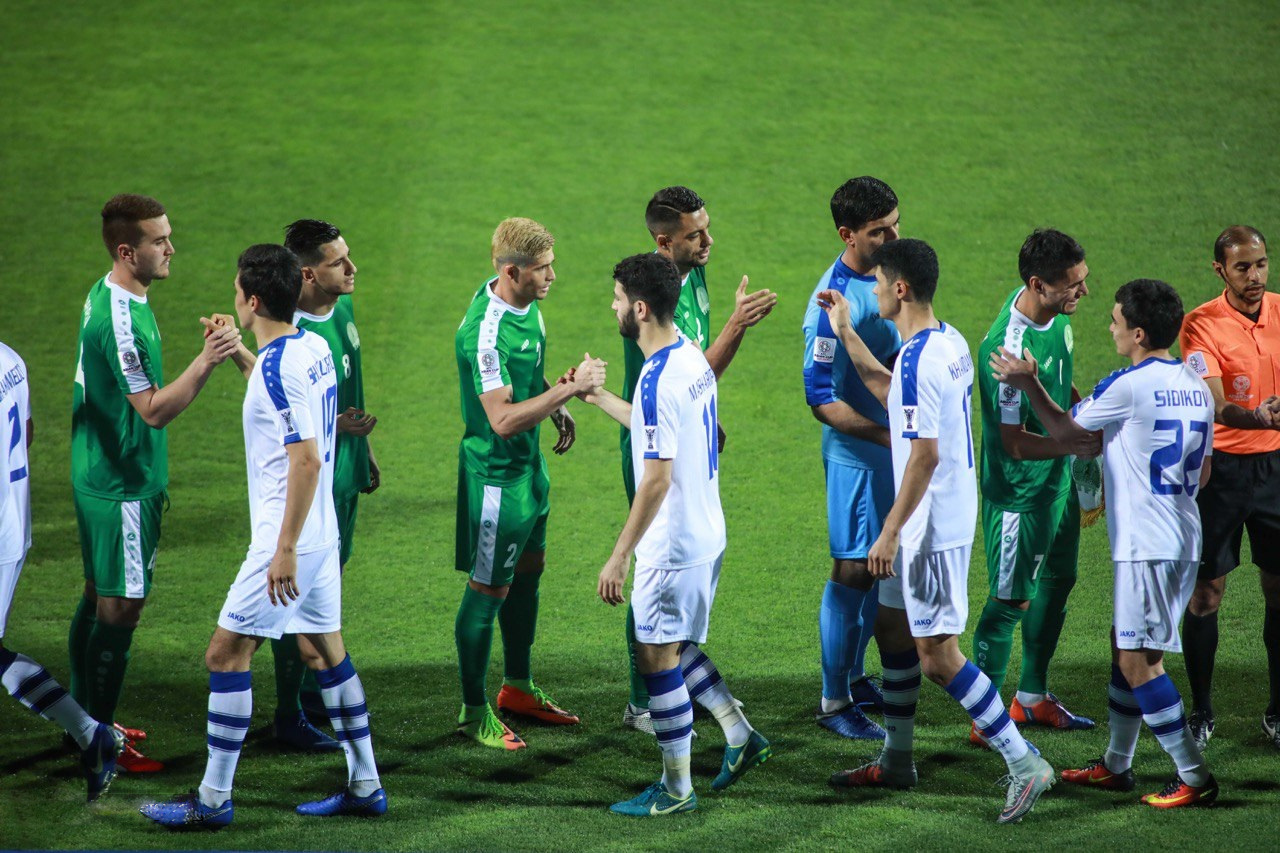
- Asian Cup 2019

Personal information
- Full name: Zafar Yuldoshevich Babajanow
- Date of birth: 9 February 1987 (age 39)
- Place of birth: Daşoguz, Turkmen SSR, USSR
- Height: 1.78 m (5 ft 10 in)
- Position: Defender

Team information
- Current team: Altyn Asyr
- Number: 2

Senior career*
Years	Team	Apps	(Gls)
2010–2013	Balkan		
2013–2014	Kartalspor	7	(0)
2014–2015	Ahal		
2016–	Altyn Asyr		

International career^{‡}
2012–	Turkmenistan	10	(1)
- * Club domestic league appearances and goals as of 28 September 2013 ‡ National team caps and goals as of 9 June 2021

Zafar Yuldoshevich Babajanow (born 9 February 1987) is a Turkmen professional footballer currently playing for FC Altyn Asyr and Turkmenistan national football team.

== Club career ==
At 2013–2014 season played for Turkish Kartalspor at TFF First League, 7 games.

From 2014 play for Ahal FK in Ýokary Liga. Since 2016 plays for FC Altyn Asyr.

== Career statistics ==
=== International ===
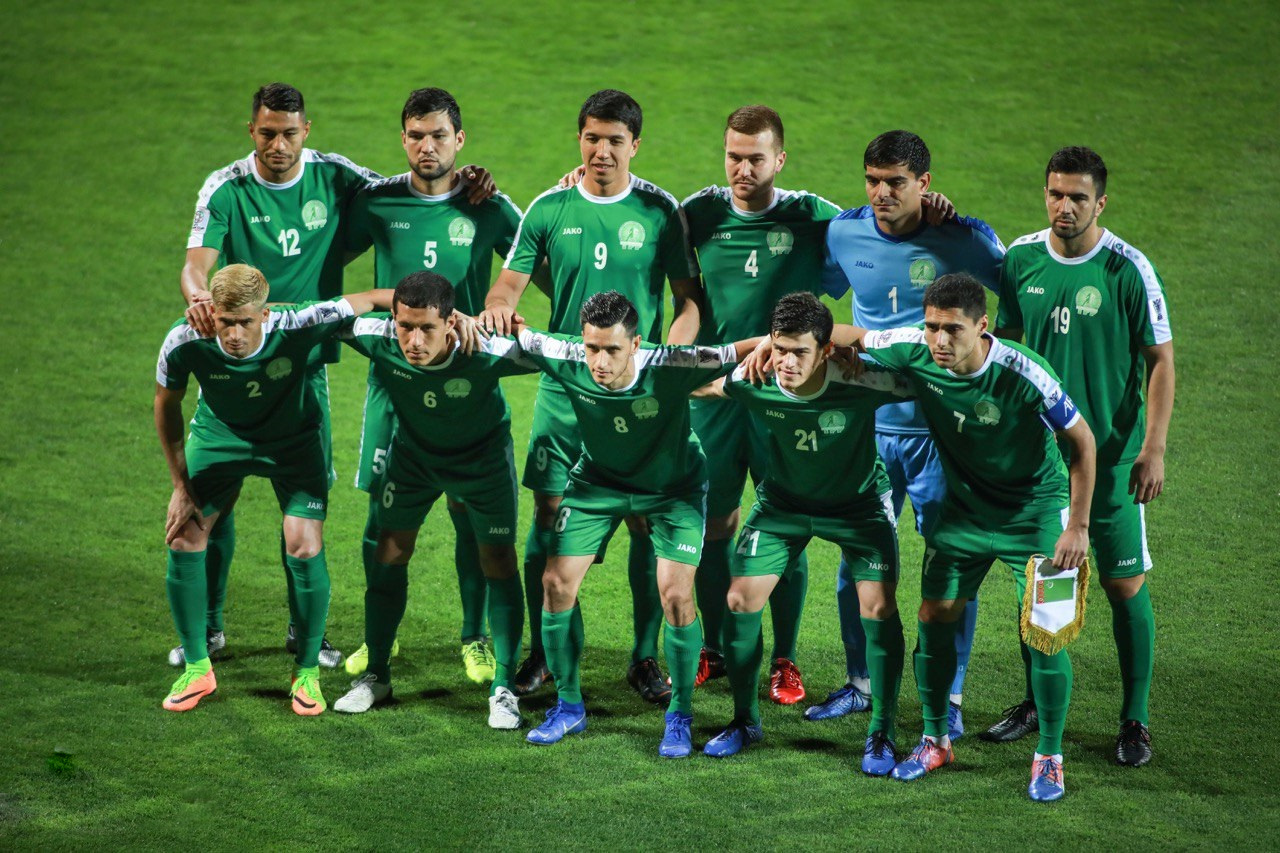
No.2 Babajanow at Asian Cup 2019

Turkmenistan
Year	Apps	Goals
2015	1	0
2016	1	0
2017	1	0
2018	1	0
2019	4	0
2021	2	1
Total	10	1

Statistics accurate as of match played 9 June 2021

Scores and results list Turkmenistan's goal tally first.

List of international goals scored by Zafar Babajanow
No.	Date	Venue	Opponent	Score	Result	Competition
1	9 June 2021	Goyang Stadium, Goyang, South Korea	Lebanon	1–0	3–2	2022 FIFA World Cup qualification
