= Alibek Sapaýew =

Turkmenian professional football referee (born 1987)

- Full name: Alibek Sapayev
- Born: 16 June 1987 (age 39); USSR

Domestic
Years	League	Role

International
Years	League	Role
2012–	FIFA listed	Referee

Alibek Sapayev (born 16 June 1987) is a Turkmenian professional football referee. He has been a full international for FIFA since 2011. and has refereed in some AFC Champions League matches.
