= Yhlas Saparmämmedow =

Turkmen footballer (born 1991)

Personal information
- Full name: Yhlas Saparmämmedowiç Saparmämmedow
- Date of birth: 25 February 1997 (age 29)
- Place of birth: Aşgabat, Turkmenistan
- Position: Midfielder

Team information
- Current team: FK Arkadag
- Number: 8

Senior career*
Years	Team	Apps	(Gls)
2016	Ahal		
2017	Aşgabat		
2018–2020	Ahal		
2020–2022	Köpetdag Aşgabat	45	(8)
2023–	FK Arkadag	15	(0)

International career^{‡}
2021–	Turkmenistan	9	(1)
- * Club domestic league appearances and goals as of 29 May 2025 ‡ National team caps and goals as of 10 June 2025

Yhlas Saparmämmedowiç Saparmämmedow (born 25 February 1997) is a Turkmen professional footballer who plays for FK Arkadag and the Turkmenistan national team.

== Career statistics ==
=== International ===
As of match played 10 June 2025

Appearances and goals by national team and year
National team	Year	Apps	Goals
Turkmenistan	2021	2	0
Turkmenistan	2022	2	0
Turkmenistan	2023	3	0
Turkmenistan	2025	2	1
Total		9	1

Scores and results list Turkmenistan's goal tally first, score column indicates score after each Saparmämmedow goal.

List of international goals scored by Yhlas Saparmämmedow
No.	Date	Venue	Opponent	Score	Result	Competition
1	10 June 2025	Ashgabat Stadium, Ashgabat, Turkmenistan	Thailand	2–1	3–1	2027 AFC Asian Cup qualification

== Honours ==
FK Arkadag

- AFC Challenge League: 2024–25
