= Yhlas Magtymow =

Turkmen association football player

Personal information
- Full name: Yhlas Saparmämmet ogly Magtymow
- Date of birth: 20 April 1992 (age 34)
- Place of birth: Bereket, Balkan Region, Turkmenistan
- Position: Midfielder

Team information
- Current team: Şagadam

Senior career*
Years	Team	Apps	(Gls)
2016	Altyn Asyr		
2017–2018	Balkan		
2019–	Şagadam	53	(26)

International career^{‡}
2016–	Turkmenistan	3	(0)
- * Club domestic league appearances and goals ‡ National team caps and goals as of 1 September 2019

Yhlas Magtymov (20 April 1992) is a Turkmen professional footballer who plays for Şagadam FK and Turkmenistan as midfielder.

== Club career ==
At 2019 season signed a contract with Şagadam FK.

== International career ==
He played for Turkmenistan youth team in Commonwealth of Independent States Cup 2012.

Magtymov made his senior national team debut on 8 August 2016, in friendly match against Oman national football team.
