= Resul Hojaýew =

Turkmen footballer (born 1997)

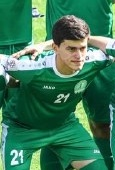
- Hojaýew at 2019 AFC Asian Cup with Turkmenistan

Personal information
- Full name: Resul Ýazgeldiýewiç Hojaýew
- Date of birth: 7 January 1997 (age 29)
- Place of birth: Ýarajy, Baherden District, Turkmenistan
- Height: 1.70 m (5 ft 7 in)
- Position: Midfielder

Team information
- Current team: FK Arkadag
- Number: 10

Youth career
- –2014: Altyn Tach

Senior career*
Years	Team	Apps	(Gls)
2014–2020	Altyn Asyr	108	(12)
2021–2022	Ahal	30	(9)
2023–	FK Arkadag	18	(2)

International career
2015	Turkmenistan U21	4	(0)
2017–	Turkmenistan	15	(1)
- * Club domestic league appearances and goals

Resul Yazgeldiyevich Hojayev (Turkmen: Resul Ýazgeldiýewiç Hojaýew; born January 7, 1997) is a Turkmen professional footballer who plays as a midfielder for FK Arkadag and the Turkmenistan national team.

He has won seven Turkmenistan Ýokary Liga titles.

== Club career ==
Resul Hojaýew started his career with Altyn Asyr in 2014.

In March 2021, FC Ahal announced the signing of Resul Hojaýew.

== International career ==
=== Under-21 ===
On 17 January 2015, Hojaýew made his debut with Turkmenistan U21 in a friendly match against Finland U21 after coming on as a substitute at 69th minute in place of Gurban Annayev.

=== Senior ===
In August 2017, Hojaýew received a call-up from Turkmenistan for the friendly match against Qatar and made his debut after being named in the starting line-up and scored his side's only goal during a 2–1 away defeat.

On 27 December 2018, Hojaýew was named as part of the Turkmenistan squad for 2019 AFC Asian Cup. On 9 January 2019, he made his competitive debut with Turkmenistan in a match against Japan after being named in the starting line-up.

== Career statistics ==
As of 14 November 2019

National team	Year	Apps	Goals
Turkmenistan	2017	1	1
Turkmenistan	2018	0	0
Turkmenistan	2019	6	0
Total		7	0

== Honours ==
FK Arkadag

- AFC Challenge League: 2024–25

Altyn Asyr

- Ýokary Liga: 2014, 2015, 2016, 2017, 2018, 2019, 2020
