= Ilýa Tamurkin =

Turkmen footballer

Personal information
- Date of birth: 9 May 1989 (age 37)
- Place of birth: Mary, USSR
- Height: 1.77 m (5 ft 9 1/2 in)
- Position: Midfielder

Team information
- Current team: FK Arkadag
- Number: 27

Senior career*
Years	Team	Apps	(Gls)
2010–2018	Merw	108	(22)
2018	FC Alga Bishkek	14	(3)
2019	Merw	22	(4)
2020–2022	Ahal	32	(7)
2023–2025	FK Arkadag	15	(0)

International career
2014–present	Turkmenistan	11	(0)
- * Club domestic league appearances and goals

Ilýa Tamurkin (Russian: Илья Тамуркин; born 9 May 1989) is a Turkmen professional footballer who plays for the Turkmenistan national football team as a midfielder.

== Club career ==
Professional career began at Merw FK.

He spent the season of 2018 for the FC Alga Bishkek in the championship of Kyrgyzstan.

In 2019, he returned to Turkmenistan, again becoming a FC Merw player.

In January 2020, he joined the Ýokary Liga vice-champion FC Ahal.

== International career ==
Tamurkin made his senior national team debut on 22 May 2014, in a 2014 AFC Challenge Cup match against Afghanistan. He was included in Turkmenistan's squad for the 2019 AFC Asian Cup in the United Arab Emirates.

== Personal life ==
Tamurkin is an ethnic Russian-Tatar.
