= FC Energetik Mary =

FC Energetik
- Full name: Futbol Kluby Energetik
- Founded: 2015; 11 years ago
- Manager: Serdar Garajaýew
- League: Ýokary Liga
- 2024: Ýokary Liga, 9th of 9 (Withdrew or Excluded)

FC Energetik is a Turkmen professional association football club based in the Türkmenbaşy village, Mary Province. Founded in 2015, the club played its first-ever top flight season in 2015. The club finished in third position in 2016, their highest achievement.

== Name history ==
- 2010 : Founded as Kuwwat
- 2014 : Renamed Mary GES
- 2015 : Renamed Energetik

== History ==
The team was established in 2010 as FC Kuwwat. In 2010–2014 they played among the amateur teams in the first division of Turkmenistan under coach Arseniý Ýüzbaşýan. In 2014 the team won the Turkmenistan First League, and won the right to participate in the Ýokary Liga. In 2015 the club changed its name to FC Energetik and became professional. With the new season the club was headed by Rahym Kurbanmämmedow, who was helped in his work with the team by Aleksandr Klimenko and Dmitriý Hasanow. Their debut game in the 2015 Ýokary Liga was held on 6 March 2015 where FC Energetik was defeated by FC Ahal (0:6).

== Manager history ==
Name	Nat.	From	To	Honours	Notes
Rahmanguly Baýlyýew	Turkmenistan	January 2020	December 2020		
Serdar Garajaýew	Turkmenistan	1 April 2020			

== Honours ==
=== Domestic ===
- Ýokary Liga
  - Third place (2): 2016, 2018
- Turkmenistan Cup
  - Runners-up (1): 2018
