= FK Köpetdag Aşgabat =

Köpetdag
- Full name: Köpetdag Futbol Kluby
- Founded: 1947; 79 years ago
- Ground: Köpetdag Stadium
- Capacity: 26,000
- Manager: Berdi Hotdyýew
- League: Ýokary Liga
- 2025: Ýokary Liga, 7th of 8
Home colours	Away colours

FK Köpetdag Aşgabat (Football Club Köpetdag, Turkmen: Köpetdag Futbol Kluby) is a professional football club based in Ashgabat, Turkmenistan. It currently plays in the top tier Ýokary Liga. Their home ground is Köpetdag Stadium which can hold 26,000 people. The Köpetdag traditional kit colours are blue and white. They are one of the country's most successful clubs having won six Turkmen championships and six cups.

== History ==
=== USSR ===
The club participated in 44 of the USSR championships (1947–54, 1956–91). They appeared under the names of Locomotiv (1947–49), Spartak (1950–54), Kolhozchi (1956–59, 1976–87), Stroitel (1962–75) and Köpetdag (1960, 1961, 1988–91, present).

- Soviet League Second group (1947–49), the best place: 3rd in 1948
- Soviet League Class B (1950–54, 1956–63), the best place: 2nd in 1963
- Soviet League Class A, the second group (1964–69), the best place: 4th in 1967
- Soviet First League (1970–74, 1976–79), the best place: 9th in 1976
- Soviet Second League (1975, 1980–91), the best place: 2nd in 1975 and 1991.

In the Soviet era, one of the coaches of the team in the 1980s was Valery Nepomnyashchy.

=== Turkmenistan ===
After the collapse of the Soviet Union the team planned to participate in the open championship of the CIS, but because of many differences the championship did not take place. The team served as the defacto Turkmenistan national football team in the early years of Turkmenistan.

In 2008 they were disbanded due to financial conditions but have since returned.

=== New era ===
In 2015, on the basis of MIA of Turkmenistan direction the club FC Kopetdag was re-created. Club began to make appearances in the First League of Turkmenistan. The team qualified for 2015 Turkmenistan Cup. They achieved promotion in the 2016 season by winning the promotion play-off.

=== Domestic history ===
Season	League									Turkmenistan Cup	Top goalscorer		Manager
Season	Div.	Pos.	Pl.	W	D	L	GS	GA	P	Turkmenistan Cup	Name	League	Manager
2015	2nd	1	28							Round of 16			(Turkmenistan) Said Seýidow
2016	1st	7	36	11	6	18	37	63	39	Quarterfinal			(Turkmenistan) Said Seýidow
2017	1st	7	32	9	6	17	35	55	33	Quarterfinal			(Turkmenistan) Said Seýidow
2018	1st	6	28	8	5	15	27	39	29	Champions			(Turkmenistan) Said Seýidow
2019	1st	4	28	11	6	11	33	37	39	Semifinal			(Turkmenistan) Said Seýidow (Turkmenistan) Çary Annakow (Caretaker) (Turkmenistan) Tofik Şükürow
2020	1st	4	28	11	8	9	33	27	41	Runners Up			(Turkmenistan) Tofik Şükürow
2021	1st	4	14	5	6	3	22	18	21		(Turkmenistan) Begenç Akmämmedow	6	(Turkmenistan) Tofik Şükürow

=== Continental history ===
As of match played 27 June 2022

Competition	Pld	W	D	L	GF	GA
Asian Club Championship	22	9	3	10	39	29
Asian Cup Winners' Cup	8	3	1	4	16	13
AFC Cup	2	1	0	1	2	3
Total	32	13	4	15	57	45

Season	Competition	Round	Club	Home	Away	Aggregate
1994–95	Asian Club Championship	Preliminary round	(Kazakhstan) Ansat Pavlodar	2–0		2nd
1994–95	Asian Club Championship	Preliminary round	(Tajikistan) Sitora Dushanbe	7–1		2nd
1994–95	Asian Club Championship	Preliminary round	(Kyrgyzstan) Alga Bishkek	1–0		2nd
1994–95	Asian Club Championship	Preliminary round	(Uzbekistan) Neftchi Fergana	1–2		2nd
1995	Asian Club Championship	First round	(Kyrgyzstan) Kant-Oil	6–0	0–2	6–2
1995	Asian Club Championship	Second round	(Lebanon) Al Ansar	1–1	5–0	6–1
1995	Asian Club Championship	Quarterfinal	(Iran) Saipa	0–1		4th
1995	Asian Club Championship	Quarterfinal	(Qatar) Al-Arabi	2–2		4th
1995	Asian Club Championship	Quarterfinal	(Saudi Arabia) Al Nassr	0–1		4th
1996–97	Asian Club Championship	First round	(Iran) Persepolis	0–0	0–1	0–1
1997–98	Asian Cup Winners' Cup	First round	(Uzbekistan) Neftchi Fergana	4–0	2–3	6–3
1997–98	Asian Cup Winners' Cup	Second round	(Kazakhstan) Kairat	2–0	1–3	3–3 (a)
1997–98	Asian Cup Winners' Cup	Quarterfinal	(Iraq) Al-Shorta	4–0	1–1	5–1
1997–98	Asian Cup Winners' Cup	Semifinal	(Saudi Arabia) Al Nassr	1–2		
1997–98	Asian Cup Winners' Cup	Third place match	(China) Beijing Guoan	1–4		
1998–99	Asian Club Championship	First round	(Kazakhstan) Irtysh Pavlodar	4–1	0–3	4–4
1998–99	Asian Club Championship	Second round	(Tajikistan) Vakhsh Qurghonteppa	5–0	1–0	6–0
1998–99	Asian Club Championship	Quarterfinal	(United Arab Emirates) Al Ain	1–6		4th
1998–99	Asian Club Championship	Quarterfinal	(Saudi Arabia) Al Hilal	2–4		4th
1998–99	Asian Club Championship	Quarterfinal	(Iran) Esteghlal	1–0		4th
2001–02	Asian Club Championship	First round	(Uzbekistan) Nasaf Qarshi	0–1	0–3	0–4
2022	AFC Cup	Group F	(Kyrgyzstan) Dordoi Bishkek	1–0		2nd
2022	AFC Cup	Group F	(Tajikistan) Khujand	1–3		2nd

=== Commonwealth of Independent States Cup ===
- 1993: Group stage
- 1994: Semi-final
- 1995: Group stage
- 1994: Group stage
- 1997: Semi-final
- 1998: Semi-final
- 1999: Group stage
- 2001: Semi-final

== Honours ==
- Ýokary Liga
  - Champions (6): 1992, 1993, 1994, 1995, 1998, 2000
- Birinji liga
  - Champions (1): 2015
- Turkmenistan Cup
  - Winners (7): 1993, 1994, 1997, 1999, 2000, 2001, 2018
  - Runners-up (4): 1995, 2005, 2006, 2020
- SSR Turkmenistan Cup
  - Winners (1): 1992
- Turkmenistan Super Cup
  - Runners-up (1): 2019

== Club officials ==
=== Technical staff ===
- Berdi Hotdyýew: Head Coach
- Gahrymanberdi Çoňkaýew: Assistant coach

== Coaches ==
- Alexei Sokolov (1950–51)
- Leo Olshansky (1952–53)
- Stepan Arutyunov (1957)
- Vladimir Alyakrinsky (1964)
- Vladimir Eremeev (1965–66)
- Sergei Budagov (1967–68)
- Holodkov Seraphim (1969)
- Sergei Korshunov (June 1970)
- Sergei Budagov (1971)
- Vladimir Yulygin (1973–74)
- Viktor Kuznetsov (1975–78)
- Anatoli Polosin (1979, until June 11)
- Valery Nepomnyashchy (June 11, 1979, 1982–83)
- Edward Danilov (1984)
- Arsen Naydyonov (1985)
- Vladimir Yulygin (1986)
- Viktor Kuznetsov (1987)
- Vladislav Kazakov (1988)
- Victor Orlov (1989)
- Baýram Durdyýew (1990–96)
- Boris Lavrov (1997–98)
- Tachmurad Agamuradov (July 1998)
- Viktor Pozhechevskyi (July 1998–Jan 1999)
- Ravil Menzeleev – Sergei Kazankov (1999)
- Tachmurad Agamuradov (2000–01)
- Baýram Durdyýew (2001–02)
- Berdymyrat Nurmyradow (2003–07)
- Said Seyidov (2015 – May 2019)
- Çary Annakow (May 2019 – June 2019)
- Tofik Şükürow (June 2019 – August 2024)
- Begenç Garaýew (August 2024 – December 2025)
- Berdi Hotdyýew (January 2025 – nowadays)
