= Iran national football team records and statistics =

- Win Draw Loss

This is a list of the Iran national football team's competitive records.

== Individual records ==
=== Appearances ===
Most capped players

As of 17 November 2026, the players with the most caps for Iran are:

Rank	Player	Career	Caps	Goals
1	**Ehsan Hajsafi**	2008–	150	7
2	Javad Nekounam	2000–2015	149	38
3	Ali Daei	1993–2006	148	108
4	Ali Karimi	1998–2013	127	38
5	Jalal Hosseini	2007–2018	115	8
6	**Mehdi Taremi**	2015–	111	60
7	Mehdi Mahdavikia	1996–2009	110	13
8	Karim Ansarifard	2009–2024	104	30
9	Andranik Teymourian	2005–2016	101	9
9	**Alireza Jahanbakhsh**	2013–	101	17
11	**Sardar Azmoun**	2014–	95	58

The records are collected based on data from FIFA and RSSSF.
bold names denotes a player still playing or available for selection.

Most capped goalkeepers

Rank	Player	Caps	Career
1	**Alireza Beiranvand**	90	2015–
2	Mehdi Rahmati	76	2004–2012
3	Ahmad Reza Abedzadeh	73	1987–1998
4	Ebrahim Mirzapour	70	2001–2011
5	Nasser Hejazi	62	1968–1980

World Cup appearances

- **Ehsan Hajsafi**, 11 Games, 2014, 2018, 2022, 2026
- **Alireza Jahanbakhsh**, 10 Games, 2014, 2018, 2022, 2026
- **Mehdi Taremi**, 9 Games, 2018, 2022, 2026
- **Alireza Beiranvand**, 8 Games, 2018, 2022, 2026
- **Ramin Rezaeian**, 8 Games, 2018, 2022, 2026
- **Milad Mohammadi**, 8 Games, 2018, 2022, 2026
- **Saeid Ezatolahi**, 8 Games, 2018, 2022, 2026
- **Saman Ghoddos**, 7 Games, 2018, 2022, 2026
- Karim Ansarifard, 6 Games, 2014, 2018, 2022
- Sardar Azmoun, 6 Games, 2018, 2022
- Morteza Pouraliganji, 6 Games, 2018, 2022
- Majid Hosseini, 6 Games, 2018, 2022
- Mehdi Mahdavikia, 6 Games, 1998, 2006
- Andranik Teymourian, 6 Games, 2006, 2014

World Cup event appearances

- **Ehsan Hajsafi**, 4 World Cups, 2014, 2018, 2022, 2026
- **Alireza Jahanbakhsh**, 4 World Cups, 2014, 2018, 2022, 2026
- **Mehdi Taremi**, 3 World Cups, 2018, 2022, 2026
- **Alireza Beiranvand**, 3 World Cups, 2018, 2022, 2026
- **Ramin Rezaeian**, 3 World Cups, 2018, 2022, 2026
- **Milad Mohammadi**, 3 World Cups, 2018, 2022, 2026
- **Saeid Ezatolahi**, 3 World Cups, 2018, 2022, 2026
- **Saman Ghoddos**, 3 World Cups, 2018, 2022, 2026
- **Mehdi Torabi**, 3 World Cups, 2018, 2022, 2026
- Masoud Shojaei, 3 World Cups, 2006, 2014, 2018
- Karim Ansarifard, 3 World Cups, 2014, 2018, 2022

Oldest player to feature at the World Cup
Ali Daei, 37 years, 2006

Shoja Khalilzadeh, 37 years, 2026

Youngest player to feature at the World Cup
Hossein Kaebi, 20 years and 9 months, 2006

Oldest player to feature at the Asian Cup
Ali Daei, 35 years, 2004
First appearance by a player who had never played for an Iranian club
Ferydoon Zandi, vs Bahrain on 9 February 2005
First player to debut as a substitute
Mohammad Mohajer, on 25 August 1941 vs Afghanistan

=== Goals ===
Top goalscorers

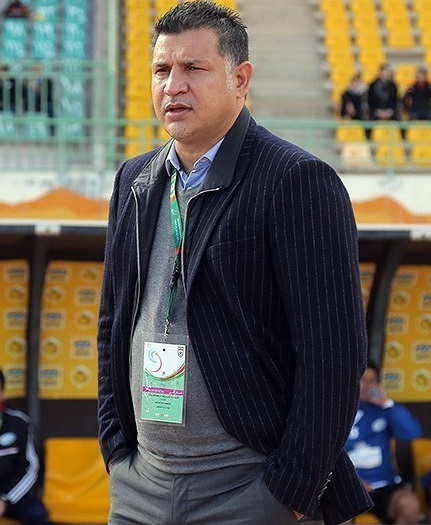
Ali Daei is the world's former all-time leading goalscorer in international matches, having scored 108 goals in 148 matches

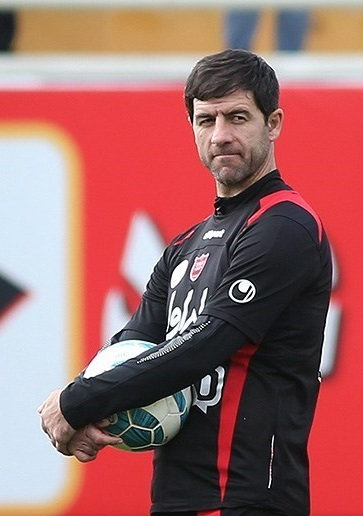
Karim Bagheri is the world's most scoring midfielder of all-time with 50 goals in 87 matches.

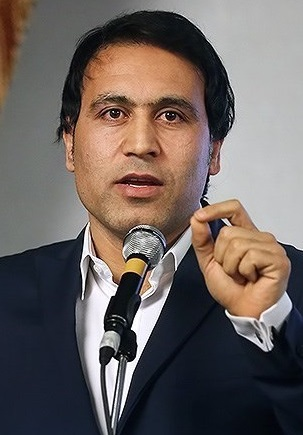
Mehdi Mahdavikia is the all-time assist leader in history of Team Melli.

Rank	Player	Goals	Caps	Ratio	Career
1	Ali Daei (list)	108	148	0.73	1993–2006
2	**Mehdi Taremi**	60	111	0.54	2015–
3	**Sardar Azmoun**	58	95	0.61	2014–
4	Karim Bagheri	50	87	0.57	1993–2010
5	Ali Karimi	38	127	0.3	1998-2012
5	Javad Nekounam	38	149	0.26	2000–2015
7	Karim Ansarifard	30	104	0.29	2009–2024
8	Gholam Hossein Mazloumi	19	40	0.48	1969–1977
9	Farshad Pious	18	34	0.53	1984–1994
10	Reza Ghoochannejhad	17	44	0.39	2012–2018
10	**Alireza Jahanbakhsh**	17	101	0.17	2013–

First goal
Masoud Boroumand vs Turkey, Friendly, 26 October 1947

Most goals in a match

- **Karim Bagheri**, **7 goals** vs Maldives, 2 June 1997 (1998 World Cup qualification)
- **Karim Bagheri**, **6 goals** vs Guam, 24 November 2000 (2002 World Cup Qualification)
- **Ali Daei**, **5 goals** vs Sri Lanka, 12 June 1996 (1996 AFC Asian Cup qualification)

Four goals in a match

- **Behtash Fariba** vs Bangladesh, 22 September 1980 (1980 AFC Asian Cup)
- **Nasser Mohammadkhani** vs Bangladesh, 7 August 1984 (1984 AFC Asian Cup qualification);
- **Ali Asghar Modir Roosta** vs Taiwan, 25 June 1993 (1994 World Cup qualification)
- **Ali Daei** vs Nepal, 10 June 1996 (1996 AFC Asian Cup qualification)
- **Ali Daei** vs South Korea, 16 December 1996 (1996 AFC Asian Cup)
- **Ali Karimi** vs Guam, 24 November 2000 (2002 World Cup qualification)
- **Ali Daei** vs Laos, 17 November 2004 (2006 World Cup qualification)
- **Karim Ansarifard** vs Cambodia, 11 October 2019 (2022 World Cup qualification)

Three goals in a match

- **Masoud Boroumand** vs Pakistan, 27 October 1950
- **Abbas Hajari** vs Pakistan, 14 December 1959 (1960 AFC Asian Cup qualification)
- **Ali Jabbari** vs Pakistan, 12 March 1969
- **Hossein Kalani** vs Iraq, 9 May 1972 (1972 AFC Asian Cup)
- **Ali Jabbari** vs Thailand, 13 May 1972 (1972 AFC Asian Cup)
- **Gholam Hossein Mazloumi** vs Pakistan, 3 September 1974 (1974 Asian Games)
- **Gholam Hossein Mazloumi** vs South Yemen, 8 June 1976 (1976 AFC Asian Cup)
- **Karim Bavi** vs Nepal, 4 June 1988 (1988 AFC Asian Cup qualification)
- **Farshad Pious** vs Malaysia, 24 September 1990 (1990 Asian Games)
- **Karim Bagheri** vs Sri Lanka, 17 June 1996 (1996 AFC Asian Cup qualification)
- **Hamid Estili** vs Maldives, 2 June 1997 (1998 World Cup qualification)
- **Ali Daei** vs Uzbekistan, 14 December 1998 (1998 Asian Games)
- **Ali Daei** vs Maldives, 31 March 2000 (2000 AFC Asian Cup qualification)
- **Ali Daei** vs Guam, 24 November 2000 (2002 World Cup qualification)
- **Farhad Majidi** vs Guam, 24 November 2000 (2002 World Cup qualification)
- **Sirous Dinmohammadi** vs Oman, 8 August 2001
- **Ali Karimi** vs Slovakia, 15 August 2001
- **Ali Daei** vs Lebanon, 17 June 2004 (2004 WAFF West Asian Championship)
- **Ali Karimi** vs South Korea, 31 July 2004 (2004 AFC Asian Cup)
- **Javad Nekounam** vs Lebanon, 6 February 2013 (2015 AFC Asian Cup qualification)
- **Sardar Azmoun** vs North Macedonia, 2 June 2016
- **Mehdi Taremi** vs Syria, 6 June 2019
- **Sardar Azmoun** vs Cambodia, 11 October 2019 (2022 World Cup qualification)
- **Mehdi Taremi** vs Afghanistan, 13 June 2023 (2023 CAFA Nations Cup)
- **Mehdi Taremi** vs Kyrgyzstan, 16 June 2023 (2023 CAFA Nations Cup)
- **Mehdi Taremi** vs Hong Kong, 6 June 2024 (2026 World Cup qualification)

First goal in a World Cup match
Iraj Danaeifard, 1978 FIFA World Cup vs Scotland
First goal in a World Cup qualifying campaign
Gholam Vafakhah vs Kuwait, 6 May 1973 (1974 World Cup qualification)
Oldest goalscorer at the World Cup
Ramin Rezaeian, 36 years, 2026
Youngest goalscorer at the World Cup
Mehdi Mahdavikia, 20 years, 1998
Oldest goalscorer at the Asian Cup
Ali Daei, 35 years, 2004
Most goals scored from penalties
Ali Daei 16 Goals.
Youngest goalscorer
Allahyar Sayyadmanesh, 17 years and 342 days, 2019
First goal by a substitute
First Iranian goalscorer at the Azadi Stadium : Parviz Ghelichkhani vs Australia 24 August 1973

Hat-tricks

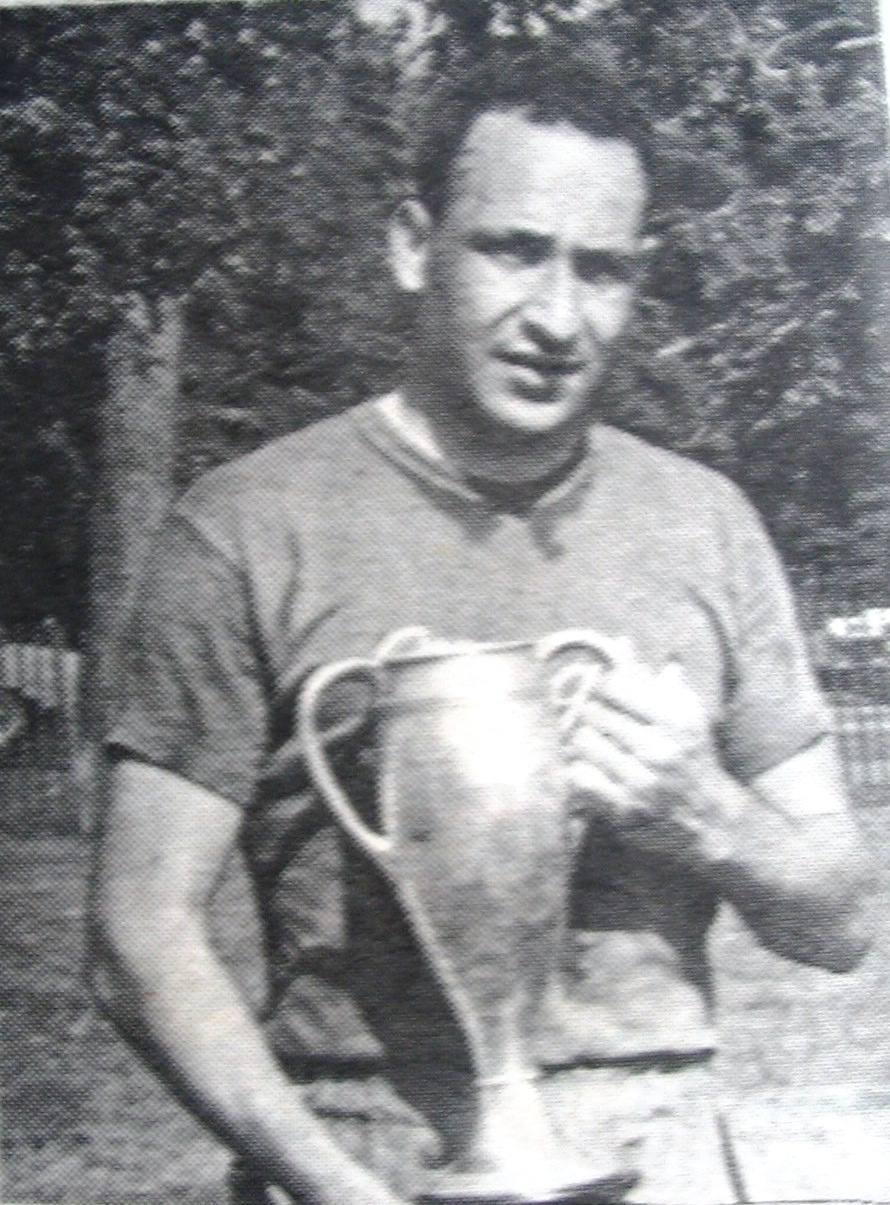
Masoud Boroumand, scorer of first hat-trick for Iran.

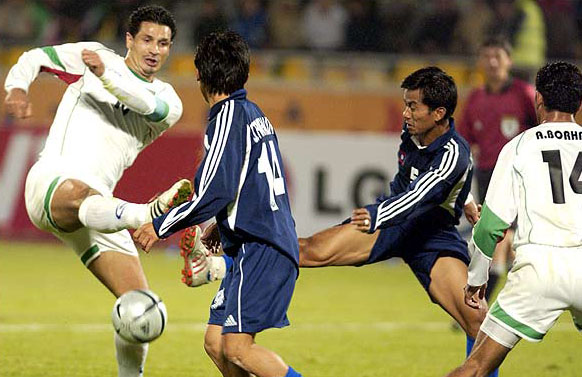
Ali Daei, scorer of eight hat-tricks for Iran.

No.	Player	Opponent	Goals	Date	Competition
1	Masoud Boroumand	Pakistan	3	27 October 1950	International Match
2	Abbas Hajari	Pakistan	3	14 December 1959	1960 AFC Asian Cup qualification
3	Ali Jabbari	Pakistan	3	12 March 1969	International Match
4	Hossein Kalani	Iraq	3	9 May 1972	1972 AFC Asian Cup
5	Ali Jabbari	Thailand	3	13 May 1972	1972 AFC Asian Cup
6	Gholam Hossein Mazloumi	Pakistan	3	3 September 1974	1974 Asian Games
7	Gholam Hossein Mazloumi	South Yemen	3	8 June 1976	1976 AFC Asian Cup
8	Behtash Fariba	Bangladesh	4	22 September 1980	1980 AFC Asian Cup
9	Nasser Mohammadkhani	Bangladesh	4	7 August 1984	1984 AFC Asian Cup qualification
10	Karim Bavi	Nepal	3	4-Jun-1988	1988 AFC Asian Cup qualification
11	Farshad Pious	Malaysia	3	24 September 1990	1990 Asian Games
12	Ali Asghar Modir Roosta	Taiwan	4	25 June 1993	1994 World Cup qualification
13	Ali Daei	Nepal	4	10 June 1996	1996 AFC Asian Cup qualification
14	Ali Daei	Sri Lanka	5	12 June 1996	1996 AFC Asian Cup qualification
15	Karim Bagheri	Sri Lanka	3	17 June 1996	1996 AFC Asian Cup qualification
16	Ali Daei	South Korea	4	16 December 1996	1996 AFC Asian Cup
17	Karim Bagheri	Maldives	7	2 June 1997	1998 World Cup qualification
18	Hamid Estili	Maldives	3	2 June 1997	1998 World Cup qualification
19	Ali Daei	Uzbekistan	3	14 December 1998	1998 Asian Games
20	Ali Daei	Maldives	3	31 March 2000	2000 AFC Asian Cup qualification
21	Karim Bagheri	Guam	6	24 November 2000	2002 World Cup qualification
22	Ali Karimi	Guam	4	24 November 2000	2002 World Cup qualification
23	Ali Daei	Guam	3	24 November 2000	2002 World Cup qualification
24	Farhad Majidi	Guam	3	24 November 2000	2002 World Cup qualification
25	Sirous Dinmohammadi	Oman	3	8 August 2001	International Match
26	Ali Karimi	Slovakia	3	15 August 2001	International Match
27	Ali Daei	Lebanon	3	17 June 2004	2004 WAFF West Asian Championship
28	Ali Karimi	South Korea	3	31 July 2004	2004 AFC Asian Cup
29	Ali Daei	Laos	4	17 November 2004	2006 World Cup qualification
30	Javad Nekounam	Lebanon	3	6 February 2013	2015 AFC Asian Cup qualification
31	Sardar Azmoun	North Macedonia	3	2 June 2016	International Match
32	Mehdi Taremi	Syria	3	6 June 2019	International Match
33	Karim Ansarifard	Cambodia	4	11 October 2019	2022 World Cup qualification
34	Sardar Azmoun	Cambodia	3	11 October 2019	2022 World Cup qualification
35	Mehdi Taremi	Afghanistan	3	13 June 2023	2023 CAFA Nations Cup
36	Mehdi Taremi	Kyrgyzstan	3	16 June 2023	2023 CAFA Nations Cup
37	Mehdi Taremi	Hong Kong	3	6 June 2024	2026 World Cup qualification

== Team records ==
=== Biggest Wins ===
As of 17 November 2026

Number	Year	Opponent	Result
1	2000	Guam	19 – 0
2	1997	Maldives	17 – 0
3	2019	Cambodia	14 – 0
4	1980	Sri Lanka	11 – 0
5	2021	Cambodia	10 – 0
6	1982	Bangladesh	9 – 0
6	1997	Maldives	9 – 0
8	1969	Pakistan	9 – 1
9	1976	South Yemen	8 – 0
9	1996	Nepal	8 – 0
9	2000	Maldives	8 – 0
12	2016	Papua New Guinea	8 – 1
12	2007	Jamaica	8 – 1

=== Biggest Defeats ===
As of 17 November 2026

Number	Year	Opponent	Result
1	1950	Turkey	1 – 6
2	1958	South Korea	0 – 5
2	1972	Hungary	0 – 5
4	2022	England	2 – 6
5	2000	Austria	1 – 5
6	1958	Israel	0 – 4
6	1969	Turkey	0 – 4
6	2007	Mexico	0 – 4
6	1964	East Germany	0 – 4
6	1972	Denmark	0 – 4

=== Top Results ===
Include only official results.

==== Biggest Wins ====
As of 17 November 2026

122 Win with +3 and more / 84 Win with only +2 / 154 Win with only +1

Number	Year	Opponent	Result
GD +10 and more
1	2000	Guam	19 – 0
2	1997	Maldives	17 – 0
3	2019	Cambodia	14 – 0
4	2021	Cambodia	10 – 0
GD +9
5	1982	Bangladesh	9 – 0
6	1997	Maldives	9 – 0
GD +8
7	1969	Pakistan	9 – 1
8	1976	South Yemen	8 – 0
9	1996	Nepal	8 – 0
10	2000	Maldives	8 – 0
GD +7
11	2007	Jamaica	8 – 1
12	2016	Papua New Guinea	8 – 1
13	1970	Pakistan	7 – 0
14	1974	Pakistan	7 – 0
15	1980	Bangladesh	7 – 0
16	1992	Pakistan	7 – 0
17	1996	Sri Lanka	7 – 0
18	1997	Kyrgyzstan	7 – 0
19	2004	Laos	7 – 0
20	2004	Laos	7 – 0
21	2011	Palestine	7 – 0
GD +6
22	1984	Philippines	7 – 1
23	2004	Syria	7 – 1
24	1974	Bahrain	6 – 0
25	1986	Nepal	6 – 0
26	1993	Chinese Taipei	6 – 0
27	1993	Chinese Taipei	6 – 0
28	2009	Singapore	6 – 0
29	2011	Bahrain	6 – 0
30	2015	Guam	6 – 0
31	2015	Guam	6 – 0
32	2016	Kyrgyzstan	6 – 0
GD +5
33	1998	Laos	6 – 1
34	2008	Qatar	6 – 1
35	2012	Tajikistan	6 – 1
36	2023	Afghanistan	6 – 1
37	1984	Bangladesh	5 – 0
38	1984	Thailand	5 – 0
39	1993	Pakistan	5 – 0
40	1998	Tajikistan	5 – 0
41	2013	Lebanon	5 – 0
42	2019	Yemen	5 – 0
43	2019	Syria	5 – 0
44	2024	Indonesia	5 – 0
45	2024	Turkmenistan	5 – 0
46	2026	Costa Rica	5 – 0
GD +4
47	1996	South Korea	6 – 2
48	1950	Pakistan	5 – 1
49	2023	Kyrgyzstan	5 – 1
50		24 Times	4 – 0
GD +3
51		2 Times	5 – 2
52		10 Times	4 – 1
53		37 Times	3 – 0
GD +2
54		4 Times	4 – 2
55		17 Times	3 – 1
56		63 Times	2 – 0
GD +1
57		2 Times	4 – 3
58		11 Times	3 – 2
59		48 Times	2 – 1
60		93 Times	1 – 0

==== Biggest Defeats ====
As of 17 November 2026

17 Defeat with -3 and more / 28 Defeat with only -2 / 74 Defeat with only -1

Number	Year	Opponent	Result
GD -5
1	1950	Turkey	1 – 6
2	1958	South Korea	0 – 5
GD -4
3	2022	England	2 – 6
4	2000	Austria	1 – 5
5	1958	Israel	0 – 4
6	1969	Turkey	0 – 4
7	2007	Mexico	0 – 4
GD -3
8	1959	Pakistan	1 – 4
9	1978	Peru	1 – 4
10	1972	Portugal	0 – 3
11	1973	Australia	0 – 3
12	1978	Netherlands	0 – 3
13	1988	South Korea	0 – 3
14	1993	South Korea	0 – 3
15	1998	Kuwait	0 – 3
16	2010	Brazil	0 – 3
17	2019	Japan	0 – 3
GD -2
18	1998	Oman	2 – 4
19	2009	Bahrain	2 – 4
20	1959	India	1 – 3
21	1966	Japan	1 – 3
22	1985	Yugoslavia	1 – 3
23	1997	United Arab Emirates	1 – 3
24	2001	Bahrain	1 – 3
25	2003	Kuwait	1 – 3
26	2006	Mexico	1 – 3
27	2013	Oman	1 – 3
28	2014	Bosnia and Herzegovina	1 – 3
29	2015	Sweden	1 – 3
30	2026	Uzbekistan	1 – 3
31	1971	South Korea	0 – 2
32	1977	Hungary	0 – 2
33	1985	Soviet Union	0 – 2
34	1989	China	0 – 2
35	1990	Poland	0 – 2
36	1997	Qatar	0 – 2
37	1998	Hungary	0 – 2
38	1998	Croatia	0 – 2
39	1998	Germany	0 – 2
40	2001	Republic of Ireland	0 – 2
41	2004	Germany	0 – 2
42	2005	South Korea	0 – 2
43	2006	Portugal	0 – 2
44	2022	South Korea	0 – 2
45	2026	Russia	0 – 2
GD -1
46	1993	Saudi Arabia	3 – 4
47	1997	Japan	2 – 3
48	2002	Slovakia	2 – 3
49	2003	Jordan	2 – 3
50	2009	Qatar	2 – 3
51	2024	Qatar	2 – 3
52	1962 - 2026	23 Times	1 – 2
53	1951 - 2025	45 Times	0 – 1

==== Biggest Draws ====
As of 17 November 2026

Number	Year	Opponent	Result
1	2015	Iraq	3 – 3
2		27 Times	2 – 2
3		63 Times	1 – 1
4		60 Times	0 – 0

=== PSO matches ===
PSO: 9 Matches in AFC Asian Cup - 4 Matches in Asian Games - Some of Matches in others Tournaments.

As of 17 November 2026

Number	Year	Opponent	Result
AFC Asian Cup
1	1984 AFC Asian Cup	Saudi Arabia	4 – 5
2	1984 AFC Asian Cup	Kuwait	3 – 5
3	1988 AFC Asian Cup	China	3 – 0
4	1996 AFC Asian Cup	Saudi Arabia	3 – 4
5	1996 AFC Asian Cup	Kuwait	3 – 2
6	2004 AFC Asian Cup	China	3 – 4
7	2007 AFC Asian Cup	South Korea	2 – 4
8	2015 AFC Asian Cup	Iraq	6 – 7
9	2023 AFC Asian Cup	Syria	5 – 3
Football at the Asian Games
1	1986 Asian games	South Korea	4 – 5
2	1990 Asian Games	North Korea	4 – 1
3	2002 Asian Games	South Korea	5 – 3
4	2006 Asian Games	China	8 – 7
WAFF Championship
1	2002 WAFF	Iraq	5 – 6
2	2002 WAFF	Syria	4 – 2
International Tournament
1	1977 International	Argentina	1 – 4
2	1986 International	Poland	3 – 1
3	1986 International	Poland	1 – 3
4	1989 International	South Korea	3 – 4
5	1989 International	Uganda	8 – 9
6	1998 International	Chile	4 – 2
7	2000 International	Egypt	7 – 8
8	2001 International	Italy	5 – 6
9	2002 International	Algeria	9 – 8
10	2002 International	Morocco	4 – 3
11	2002 International	Paraguay	4 – 3
12	2003 International	Uruguay	2 – 4
13	2005 International	Morocco	3 – 4
14	2005 International	Syria	5 – 3
15	2005 International	Syria	1 – 4
16	2025 Al Ain Tournament	Cape Verde	5 – 4
17	2025 Al Ain Tournament	Uzbekistan	3 – 4

=== AET matches ===
AET: Only matches that result defined in overtime (without penalty kicks).

As of 17 November 2026

Number	Year	Opponent	Result
AFC Asian Cup
1	1972 AFC Asian Cup	South Korea	2 – 1
2	1976 AFC Asian Cup	China	2 – 0
3	2000 AFC Asian Cup	South Korea	1 – 2
4	2011 AFC Asian Cup	South Korea	0 – 1
Football at the Asian Games
1	1951 Asian games	Japan	0 – 0
2	1982 Asian games	Kuwait	0 – 1
3	1990 Asian games	South Korea	1 – 0
World Cup qualification
1	1998 Qualification	Japan	2 – 3
CAFA Nations Cup
1	2025 CAFA Nations Cup	Uzbekistan	0 – 1

=== Home matches ===
As of 10 June 2025

Stadium	City	Played	W	D	L	GF	GA	GD	Win %	First Match	Most Recent
Amjadieh Stadium	Tehran	26	17	4	5	69	19	+50	65.38%	26 October 1950, v. Afghanistan	15 March 1977, v. Hungary
Aryamehr/Azadi Stadium	Tehran	166	118	34	14	382	87	+295	71.08%	4 May 1973, v. North Korea	10 June 2025, v. North Korea
Rah ahan Stadium (not official - Iran B)	Tehran	0(2)	0(2)	0	0	0(5)	0(2)	0(3)	100%	14 July 1975, v. Zaie	16 July 1975, v. Egypt
Taj Gozari/Hafezieh Stadium	Shiraz	2	2	0	0	4	0	+4	100%	6 April 1977, v. Syria	22 April 1977, v. Saudi Arabia
Takhti Mashhad Stadium	Mashhad	1	1	0	0	1	0	+1	100%	5 February 1985, v. North Korea	5 February 1985, v. North Korea
Takhti Tabriz Stadium	Tabriz	5	4	1	0	27	1	+26	80%	17 May 1996, v. Qatar	19 September 2002, v. Paraguay
Yadegar-e Emam Stadium	Tabriz	2	0	2	0	2	2	0	0%	14 April 1998, v. Kuwait	10 August 2002, v. Azerbaijan
Takhti Tehran Stadium	Tehran	3	3	0	0	11	1	+10	100%	7 August 2008, v. Palestine	13 August 2008, v. Syria
Enghelab Stadium	Karaj	1	1	0	0	3	2	+1	100%	3 March 2014, v. Kuwait	3 March 2014, v. Kuwait
Imam Reza Stadium	Mashhad	1	1	0	0	2	0	+2	100%	29 March 2022, v. Lebanon	29 March 2022, v. Lebanon
Olympic Stadium	Kish Island	1	1	0	0	2	1	+1	100%	5 January 2024, v. Burkina Faso	5 January 2024, v. Burkina Faso
Fuladshahr Stadium	Fuladshahr	1	1	0	0	1	0	+1	100%	5 September 2024, v. Kyrgyzstan	5 September 2024, v. Kyrgyzstan
Total			149	41	19	504	113	+391	71.29%	26 October 1950, v. Afghanistan	10 June 2025, v. North Korea

=== Consecutive Win Matches ===
10 Wins (World Record: Germany 15 Wins):

#	Date	Opponent	Result	Score	Venue	Competition
555	08-Oct-20	Uzbekistan	W	2–1	Tashkent, Uzbekistan	Friendly
556	12-Nov-20	Bosnia and Herzegovina	W	2–0	Sarajevo, Bosnia and Herzegovina	Friendly
557	30-Mar-21	Syria	W	3–0	Tehran	Friendly
558	03-Jun-21	Hong Kong	W	3–1	Arad, Bahrain	2022 World Cup Qualifier
559	07-Jun-21	Bahrain	W	3–0	Riffa, Bahrain	2022 World Cup Qualifier
560	11-Jun-21	Cambodia	W	10–0	Riffa, Bahrain	2022 World Cup Qualifier
561	15-Jun-21	Iraq	W	1–0	Arad, Bahrain	2022 World Cup Qualifier
562	02-Sep-21	Syria	W	1–0	Tehran	2022 World Cup Qualifier
563	07-Sep-21	Iraq	W	3–0	Doha, Qatar	2022 World Cup Qualifier
564	07-Oct-21	United Arab Emirates	W	1–0	Dubai, United Arab Emirates	2022 World Cup Qualifier
565	21-Oct-21	South Korea	D	1–1	Tehran	2022 World Cup Qualifier

=== Consecutive Unbeaten Matches ===
18 Matches (World Record - Longest Unbeaten Streaks: Italy 37 / Argentina 36 / Algeria 35 / Spain 35 / Brazil 35):

2015–2016
#	Date	Opponent	Result	Score	Venue	Competition
499	11-Jun-15	Uzbekistan	W	1–0	Tashkent, Uzbekistan	Friendly
500	16-Jun-15	Turkmenistan	D	1–1	Daşoguz, Turkmenistan	2018 World Cup Qualifier
501	03-Sep-15	Guam	W	6–0	Tehran	2018 World Cup Qualifier
502	08-Sep-15	India	W	3–0	Bangalore, India	2018 World Cup Qualifier
503	08-Oct-15	Oman	D	1–1	Muscat, Oman	2018 World Cup Qualifier
504	13-Oct-15	Japan	D	1–1	Tehran	Friendly
505	12-Nov-15	Turkmenistan	W	3–1	Tehran	2018 World Cup Qualifier
506	17-Nov-15	Guam	W	6–0	Dededo, Guam	2018 World Cup Qualifier
507	24-Mar-16	India	W	4–0	Tehran	2018 World Cup Qualifier
508	29-Mar-16	Oman	W	2–0	Tehran	2018 World Cup Qualifier
509	02-Jun-16	Macedonia	W	3–1	Skopje, Macedonia	Friendly
510	07-Jun-16	Kyrgyzstan	W	6–0	Tehran	Friendly
511	01-Sep-16	Qatar	W	2–0	Tehran	2018 World Cup Qualifier
512	06-Sep-16	China	D	0–0	Shenyang, China	2018 World Cup Qualifier
513	06-Oct-16	Uzbekistan	W	1–0	Tashkent, Uzbekistan	2018 World Cup Qualifier
514	11-Oct-16	South Korea	W	1–0	Tehran	2018 World Cup Qualifier
515	10-Nov-16	Papua New Guinea	W	8–1	Shah Alam, Malaysia	Friendly
516	15-Nov-16	Syria	D	0–0	Seremban, Malaysia	2018 World Cup Qualifier
517	18-Mar-17	Iraq	L	0–1	Tehran	Friendly

2023–2024
#	Date	Opponent	Result	Score	Venue	Competition
579	23-Mar-23	Russia	D	1–1	Tehran	Friendly
580	28-Mar-23	Kenya	W	2–1	Tehran	Friendly
581	13-Jun-23	Afghanistan	W	6–1	Bishkek, Kyrgyzstan	2023 CAFA Nations Cup
582	16-Jun-23	Kyrgyzstan	W	5–1	Bishkek, Kyrgyzstan	2023 CAFA Nations Cup
583	20-Jun-23	Uzbekistan	W	1–0	Tashkent, Uzbekistan	2023 CAFA Nations Cup
584	07-Sep-23	Bulgaria	W	1–0	Plovdiv, Bulgaria	Friendly
585	12-Sep-23	Angola	W	4–0	Tehran	Friendly
586	13-Oct-23	Jordan	W	3–1	Amman, Jordan	2023 Jordan International Tournament
587	17-Oct-23	Qatar	W	4–0	Amman, Jordan	2023 Jordan International Tournament
588	16-Nov-23	Hong Kong	W	4–0	Tehran	2026 World Cup Qualifier
589	21-Nov-23	Uzbekistan	D	2–2	Tashkent, Uzbekistan	2026 World Cup Qualifier
590	05-Jan-24	Burkina Faso	W	2–1	Kish	Friendly
591	09-Jan-24	Indonesia	W	5–0	Al Rayyan, Qatar	Friendly
592	14-Jan-24	Palestine	W	4–1	Al Rayyan, Qatar	2023 AFC Asian Cup
593	19-Jan-24	Hong Kong	W	1–0	Al Rayyan, Qatar	2023 AFC Asian Cup
594	23-Jan-24	United Arab Emirates	W	2–1	Al Rayyan, Qatar	2023 AFC Asian Cup
595	31-Jan-24	Syria	D	1–1	Doha, Qatar	2023 AFC Asian Cup
596	03-Feb-24	Japan	W	2–1	Al Rayyan, Qatar	2023 AFC Asian Cup
597	07-Feb-24	Qatar	L	2–3	Doha, Qatar	2023 AFC Asian Cup

== Competition records ==
=== International tournaments ===
==== FIFA World Cup ====
FIFA World Cup record										Qualification record					
Year	Round	Position	Pld	W	D	L	GF	GA	Squad	Pld	W	D	L	GF	GA
1930	Not a FIFA member									No qualification					
1934	Not a FIFA member									Not a FIFA member					
1938	Not a FIFA member									Not a FIFA member					
1950	Did not enter									Did not enter					
1954	Did not enter									Did not enter					
1958	Did not enter									Did not enter					
1962	Did not enter									Did not enter					
1966	Did not enter									Did not enter					
1970	Did not enter									Did not enter					
1974	Did not qualify									8	5	1	2	9	6
1978	First round	14th	3	0	1	2	2	8	Squad	12	10	2	0	20	3
1982	Withdrew									Withdrew					
1986	Disqualified									Disqualified					
1990	Did not qualify									6	5	0	1	12	5
1994	Did not qualify									11	5	3	3	23	13
1998	Group stage	20th	3	1	0	2	2	4	Squad	17	8	6	3	57	17
2002	Did not qualify									14	9	3	2	36	9
2006	Group stage	25th	3	0	1	2	2	6	Squad	12	9	1	2	29	7
2010	Did not qualify									14	5	8	1	15	9
2014	Group stage	28th	3	0	1	2	1	4	Squad	16	10	4	2	30	7
2018	Group stage	18th	3	1	1	1	2	2	Squad	18	12	6	0	36	5
2022	Group stage	26th	3	1	0	2	4	7	Squad	18	14	1	3	49	8
2026	Group stage	33rd	3	0	3	0	3	3	Squad	16	11	4	1	35	12
Total	First round	7/22	21	3	7	11	16	34	—	162	103	39	20	351	101

==== Olympic Games ====
Summer Olympics record										Qualification record					
Year	Round	Position	Pld	W	D	L	GF	GA	Squad	Pld	W	D	L	GF	GA
1900	Not an IOC member									No qualification					
1904	Not an IOC member									No qualification					
1908	Not an IOC member									No qualification					
1912	Not an IOC member									No qualification					
1920	Not an IOC member									No qualification					
1924	Not an IOC member									No qualification					
1928	Not an IOC member									No qualification					
1936	Not an IOC member									No qualification					
1948	Did not enter									No qualification					
1952	Did not enter									No qualification					
1956	Withdrew									Withdrew					
1960	Did not enter									Did not enter					
1964	First round	12th	3	0	1	2	1	6	Squad	6	4	1	1	14	3
1968	Withdrew									Withdrew					
1972	First round	12th	3	1	0	2	1	9	Squad	5	3	2	0	6	0
1976	Quarter-finals	7th	3	1	0	2	4	5	Squad	4	3	1	0	8	1
1980	Qualified but later withdrew									6	4	2	0	22	2
1984	Did not enter									Did not enter					
1988	Did not qualify									2	1	0	1	2	2
1992–present	See Iran national under-23 team									See Iran national under-23 team					
Total	Quarter-finals	4/17	9	2	1	6	6	20	—	23	15	6	2	52	8

=== Continental tournaments ===
==== AFC Asian Cup ====
AFC Asian Cup record										Qualification record					
Year	Round	Position	Pld	W	D	L	GF	GA	Squad	Pld	W	D	L	GF	GA
1956	Withdrew									Withdrew					
1960	Did not qualify									6	3	1	2	12	10
1964	Withdrew									Withdrew					
1968	Champions	1st	4	4	0	0	11	2	Squad	Qualified as hosts					
1972	Champions	1st	5	5	0	0	12	4	Squad	Qualified as holders					
1976	Champions	1st	4	4	0	0	13	0	Squad	Qualified as hosts					
1980	Third place	3rd	6	3	2	1	16	6	Squad	Qualified as holders					
1984	Fourth place	4th	6	2	4	0	8	3	Squad	6	6	0	0	22	2
1988	Third place	3rd	6	2	2	2	3	4	Squad	4	2	2	0	6	1
1992	Group stage	5th	3	1	1	1	2	1	Squad	2	2	0	0	10	0
1996	Third place	3rd	6	3	2	1	14	6	Squad	6	6	0	0	27	1
2000	Quarter-finals	5th	4	2	1	1	7	3	Squad	6	4	1	1	16	2
2004	Third place	3rd	6	3	3	0	14	8	Squad	6	5	0	1	16	5
2007	Quarter-finals	5th	4	2	2	0	6	3	Squad	6	4	2	0	12	2
2011	Quarter-finals	5th	4	3	0	1	6	2	Squad	6	4	1	1	11	2
2015	Quarter-finals	6th	4	3	1	0	7	3	Squad	6	5	1	0	18	5
2019	Semi-finals	3rd	6	4	1	1	12	3	Squad	8	6	2	0	26	3
2023	Semi-finals	3rd	6	4	1	1	12	7	Squad	8	6	0	2	34	4
2027	Qualified									6	4	2	0	16	4
Total	3 titles	16/19	74	45	20	9	143	55	—	76	57	12	7	226	41

==== Asian Games ====
Asian Games record
Year	Round	Position	Pld	W	D	L	GF	GA	Squad
1951	Runners-up	2nd	3	2	0	1	2	1	Squad
1954	Did not enter								
1958	Preliminary round	14th	2	0	0	2	0	9	Squad
1962	Did not enter								
1966	Runners-up	2nd	7	4	0	3	9	6	Squad
1970	Preliminary round	8th	2	0	1	1	2	3	Squad
1974	Champions	1st	7	7	0	0	20	1	Squad
1978	Did not enter								
1982	Quarter-finals	8th	4	2	0	2	3	2	Squad
1986	Quarter-finals	6th	5	3	1	1	13	2	Squad
1990	Champions	1st	5	4	1	0	7	1	Squad
1994	Preliminary round	9th	4	1	2	1	5	2	Squad
1998	Champions	1st	8	7	0	1	25	7	Squad
2002–present	See Iran national under-23 team								
Total	3 titles	10/13	47	30	5	12	86	34	—

=== Regional tournaments ===
==== WAFF Championship ====
WAFF Championship record
Year	Round	Position	Pld	W	D	L	GF	GA	Squad
2000	Champions	1st	5	4	1	0	7	1	Squad
2002	Third place	3rd	4	1	2	1	4	3	Squad
2004	Champions	1st	4	4	0	0	17	3	Squad
2007	Champions	1st	4 (Note: Iran played their B team in this tournament, however all matches are recognised as international "A" matches.)	3	1	0	5	1	Squad
2008	Champions	1st	4	4	0	0	13	2	Squad
2010	Runners-up	2nd	4	2	1	1	8	5	Squad
2012	Group stage	6th	3	1	2	0	2	1	Squad
2014	Did not enter								
2019–onwards	Not a WAFF member								
Total	4 Titles	7/9	28	19	7	2	56	16	—

==== West Asian Games ====
West Asian Games record (Defunct)
Year	Round	Position	Pld	W	D	L	GF	GA	Squad
1997	Champions	1st	4 (Note: The tournament was for Senior teams. However, Iran played their U23 team in this tournament, therefore matches are not recognized as international "A" matches.)	3	1	0	8	4	Squad
2002	Runners-up	2nd	4	1	3	0	5	4	Squad
2005	Third place	3rd	4	3	1	0	10	2	Squad
Total	1 title	3/3	12	7	5	0	23	10	—
Only "A" matches	1 title	3/3	—	—	—	—	—	—	—

==== CAFA Nations Cup ====
CAFA Nations Cup record
Year	Round	Position	Pld	W	D	L	GF	GA	Squad
2023	Champions	1st	3	3	0	0	12	2	Squad
2025	Runners-up	2nd	4	2	1	1	8	4	Squad
Total	1 title	2/2	7	5	1	1	20	6	—

==== RCD Cup/ECO Cup ====
RCD Cup/ECO Cup record (Defunct) (Note: The tournament was not organized by an official sub-confederation, but was part of a socio-economic pact between its member states. Therefore, it is not considered an official regional tournament.)
Year	Round	Position	Pld	W	D	L	GF	GA	Squad
1965	Champions	1st	2	1	1	0	4	1	Squad
1967	Runners-up	2nd	2	1	0	1	2	1	Squad
1969	Runners-up	2nd	2	1	0	1	4	6	Squad
1970	Champions	1st	2 (Note: Match against Turkey XI is not recognized as international "A" match.)	1	1	0	8	1	Squad
1974	Runners-up	2nd	2 (Note: Iran sent Malavan F.C. to this tournament, therefore matches against Pakistan and Turkey are not recognized as international "A" matches.)	1	0	1	2	2	Squad
1993	Champions	1st	4	4	0	0	10	2	Squad
Total	3 titles	6/6	14	9	2	3	30	13	—
Only "A" matches	3 titles	6/6	11	8	1	2	27	10	—

=== Intercontinental Tournament ===
==== Afro-Asian Cup of Nations ====
Afro-Asian Cup of Nations record (Defunct)
Year	Round	Position	Pld	W	D	L	GF	GA	Squad
1978	Not completed (Note: The trophy was not awarded, because the second leg was cancelled.)		1	1	0	0	3	0	Squad
1985	Did not qualify								
1987	Did not qualify								
1991	Runners-up	2nd	2	1	0	1	2	2	Squad Squad
1993	Did not qualify								
1995	Did not qualify								
1997	Did not qualify								
2007	Did not qualify								
Total	Runners-up	2/8	3	2	0	1	5	2	—

==== Afro-Asian Games ====
Afro-Asian Games record (Defunct)
Year	Round	Position	Pld	W	D	L	GF	GA	Squad
2003	Group stage	5th	3 (Note: Iran sent Malavan F.C. to this tournament, therefore matches are not recognized as international "A" matches.)	0	1	2	2	4	Squad
Total	Group Stage	1/1	3	0	1	2	2	4	—
Only "A" matches	Group Stage	1/1	—	—	—	—	—	—	—

==== AFC–OFC Challenge Cup ====
AFC–OFC Challenge Cup record (Defunct)
Year	Round	Position	Pld	W	D	L	GF	GA	Squad
2001	Did not qualify								
2003	Champions	1st	1	1	0	0	3	0	Squad
Total	1 title	1/2	1	1	0	0	3	0	—

=== Multinational Tournament ===
==== Islamic Solidarity Games ====
Islamic Solidarity Games record
Year	Round	Position	Pld	W	D	L	GF	GA	Squad
2005	Third place	3rd	6 (Note: The 2005 tournament was for Senior teams. However, Iran played their B team in this tournament, therefore matches are not recognized as international "A" matches.)	3	3	0	16	1	Squad
2013–present	See Iran national under-23 team								
Total	Third place	1/1	6	3	3	0	16	1	—
Only "A" matches	Third place	1/1	—	—	—	—	—	—	—

==== Afghanistan Republic Day Festival Cup ====
1. 1974 Silver
2. 1975 Silver
3. 1976 4th place
4. 1977 Silver

==== Iran national football B team ====
- 1974 Iran International Tournament: Semifinals
- 1975 Iran International Tournament: Runners-up
- 1st Great Wall Cup 1983: 9th place
- 1986 Fajr International Tournament: Group stage
- President's Gold Cup 1989: Third place

==== Korea Cup ====
- 1975 President's Cup Football Tournament Third place

==== Nehru Cup ====
- 1983 Nehru Cup
- 1985 Nehru Cup

==== Tournoi de Paris ====
- 1978 Tournoi de Paris - 4th Place

=== Minor tournament ===
==== LG Cup Four Nations Tournament ====
- Note: The list only includes editions that were participated by the Iran national team.

LG Cup record (Defunct)
Year	Round	Position	Pld	W	D	L	GF	GA
1998	Third place	3rd	2	1	0	1	1	2
2000 (Iran)	Third place	3rd	2	1	1	0	4	2
2001 (Egypt)	Fourth place	4th	2	0	0	2	0	2
2001 (Iran)	Champions	1st	2	2	0	0	9	2
2002 (Morocco)	Champions	1st	2	1	1	0	1	0
2002 (Iran)	Champions	1st	2	0	2	0	2	2
2003 (Nigeria)	Fourth place	4th	1	0	0	1	1	2
2003 (Iran)	Third place	3rd	2	1	0	1	4	2
2006 (Jordan)	Champions	1st	2	1	1	0	2	0
Total	4 titles	9/21	17	7	5	5	24	14
Only "A" Matches	4 titles	9/21	13	6	3	4	19	10

- consists of only official international "A" Senior matches (not including Youth, B Team and club team results).
- Source: https://www.rsssf.org/tablesl/lgcup.html
- Third Place Match [Jun 1] Iran did not play Ghana [Iran waited for 35 minutes on the pitch, while Ghana did not show up at all, apparently demanding prize money for the fourth-place finishers (uncommon in LG tournaments). Eventually Iran left, without obtaining any information from the Nigerian 'organisers'. One day later, the Nigerian FA awarded Ghana third place (and the relevant prize money) because Iran had left the pitch (sic!). Iran have protested.]
- 2006: Only 2 match was played like to 2025 Turkish Women's Cup.
1. 4 October 2006 IRI 2-0 IRQ
2. 6 October 2006 IRI 0-0 JOR

==== Other Minor Tournament ====
Year	Round	Pld	W	D*	L	GF	GA	GD	Pts
1969 Friendship Cup	Runners-up	4	3	0	1	13	5	+8	9
1971 Cyrus Cup	Champions	5	5	0	0	10	2	+8	15
1972 Independence Cup	Round 1	4	0	1	3	3	8	−5	1
1974 Iran Cup	Champions	4	2	2	0	4	1	+3	8
1975 Iran Cup	Round 1	2	0	1	1	1	2	−1	1
1982 Quaid-E-Azam Tournament	Champions	6	5	1	0	22	1	+21	16
1985 Nehru Cup	Round 1	3	1	0	2	5	5	0	3
1986 Fajr Cup	Runners-up	5	3	2	0	11	2	+9	11
1989 Peace and Friendship Cup	Fourth Place	5	1	3	1	5	4	+1	6
1998 Lunar New Year Cup	Third Place	2	0	1	1	1	2	−1	1
1999 Ciao February Cup	Runners-up	2	1	0	1	3	4	−1	3
1999 Canada Cup	Runners-up	3	1	2	0	4	3	+1	5
2001 Civilization Cup	Third Place	2	1	1	0	6	2	+4	4
2003 Lunar New Year Cup	Runners-up	2	1	1	0	2	1	+1	4
2005 Tehran Cup	Third place	2	1	0	1	3	2	+1	3
2008 Oman Cup	Third place	2	1	0	1	2	1	+1	3
2010 Qatar Friendship Cup	Fourth place	3	1	0	2	4	5	−1	3
2023 Jordan International Tournament	Champions	2	2	0	0	7	1	+6	6
2025 Al Ain International Cup	Runners-up	2	0	2	0	0	0	0	2
2026 Jordan International Tournament	Runners-up	2	1	0	1	6	2	+4	3
2026 Basra International Tournament	Champions	2	1	1	0	3	1	+2	4
Total (All Matches)	21/21	64	31	18	15	115	54	+61	111
Total (Only Official Matches) *	21/21	45	22	11	12	86	38	+48	77

- consist of only official international "A" Senior matches (not including Youth, B Team and club team results).
- Quaid-E-Azam International Tournament
- 1985 Nehru Cup
- 1999 Ciao February Cup
- 2001 Civilization Cup

=== Special Friendly Match ===
Year	Opponent	Pld	W	D*	L	GF	GA	GD	Pts
75th Anniversary of Real Madrid		1	0	1	0	1	1	0	1
1999 Kirin World Challenge Cup		1	0	1	0	1	1	0	1
Total	2/2	2	0	2	0	2	2	0	2

=== Friendly Match Results ===
This table consist of only 2 sided team friendly match results (not including 3 and 4 nations cup and other friendly and Minor Tournament). Also only official international "A" Senior matches (not including Youth, B Team and club team results).

- As of 29 September 2026

Year	Pld	W	D	L	GF	GA	GD	Pts
1941 Friendly Match	1	0	1	0	0	0	0	1
1949 Friendly Match	1	1	0	0	4	0	+4	3
1950 Friendly Match	2	1	0	1	6	7	-1	3
1952 Friendly Match	1	0	1	0	0	0	0	1
1962 Friendly Match	2	0	1	1	2	3	−1	1
1966 Friendly Match	1	0	1	0	0	0	0	1
1971 Friendly Match	2	1	0	1	2	2	0	3
1973 Friendly Match	1	0	1	0	0	0	0	1
1974 Friendly Match	1	0	0	1	0	1	−1	0
1975 Friendly Match	1	0	0	1	1	2	−1	0
1976 Friendly Match	1	0	1	0	2	2	0	1
1977 Friendly Match	2	0	1	1	0	2	−2	1
1978 Friendly Match	5	0	2	3	2	5	−3	2
1980 Friendly Match	2	2	0	0	5	0	+5	6
1985 Friendly Match	1	1	0	0	1	0	+1	3
1986 Friendly Match	2	1	0	1	5	2	+3	3
1989 Friendly Match	1	0	1	0	2	2	0	1
1990 Friendly Match	2	0	0	2	0	3	−3	0
1992 Friendly Match	3	0	3	0	2	2	0	3
1996 Friendly Match	9	4	3	2	9	6	+3	15
1997 Friendly Match	5	3	1	1	7	3	+4	10
1998 Friendly Match	3	0	1	2	1	6	−5	1
1999 Friendly Match	1	0	1	0	0	0	0	1
2000 Friendly Match	7	2	3	2	8	11	−3	9
2001 Friendly Match	3	1	1	1	7	7	0	4
2002 Friendly Match	4	2	1	1	7	5	+2	7
2003 Friendly Match	2	0	0	2	2	5	−3	0
2004 Friendly Match	2	1	0	1	1	2	−1	3
2005 Friendly Match	4	3	0	1	8	4	+4	9
2006 Friendly Match	4	3	1	0	11	6	+5	10
2007 Friendly Match	5	3	1	1	13	7	+6	10
2008 Friendly Match	6	3	2	1	5	3	+2	11
2009 Friendly Match	10	4	4	2	13	11	+2	16
2010 Friendly Match	5	3	1	1	6	4	+2	10
2011 Friendly Match	4	4	0	0	10	0	+10	12
2012 Friendly Match	5	1	3	1	10	6	+4	6
2013 Friendly Match	1	0	0	1	1	3	−2	0
2014 Friendly Match	6	2	3	1	5	3	+2	9
2015 Friendly Match	5	3	1	1	6	4	+2	10
2016 Friendly Match	3	3	0	0	17	2	+15	9
2017 Friendly Match	6	4	1	1	8	4	+4	13
2018 Friendly Match	12	8	2	2	17	8	+9	26
2019 Friendly Match	2	1	1	0	6	1	+5	4
2020 Friendly Match	2	2	0	0	4	1	+3	6
2021 Friendly Match	1	1	0	0	3	0	+3	3
2022 Friendly Match	4	2	1	1	4	3	+1	7
2023 Friendly Match	4	3	1	0	8	2	+6	10
2024 Friendly Match	2	2	0	0	7	1	+6	6
2025 Friendly Match	2	1	0	1	3	2	+1	3
2026 Friendly Match	4	2	0	2	6	6	0	6
Total	165	78	46	41	247	159	+88	280

==== Summary ====
Event	Gold	Silver	Bronze	Total
Asian Championship	3	0	6	9
Asian Games	3	2	0	5
West Asian Championship	4	1	1	6
West Asian Games	1	1	1	3
CAFA Nations Cup	1	1	0	2
ECO Cup	3	3	0	6
LG Cup	4	0	3	7
Minor Tournament	5	6	4	15
AFC–OFC Challenge Cup	1	0	0	1
Afro-Asian Cup of Nations	0	1	0	1
Afghanistan Republic Day Festival Cup	0	3	0	3
Total	25	18	15	58

== Head-to-head records ==
As of 17 November 2026

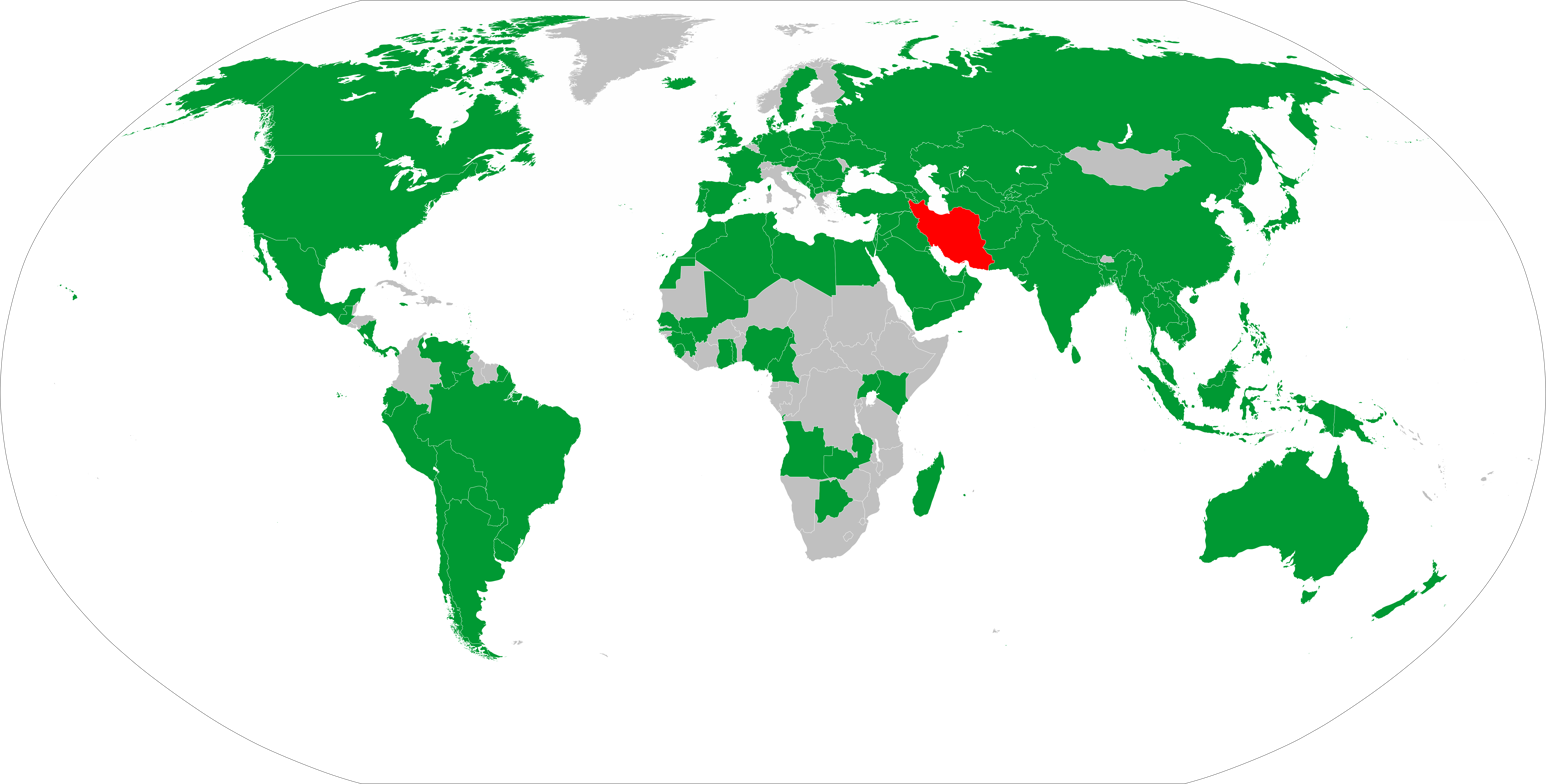
Iran national football team all opponents

The list shown below shows the Iran national football team all-time international record against opposing nations.

Team	Pld	W	D	L	GF	GA	GD	Confederation	Best win	Worst loss
Afghanistan	4	3	1	0	13	2	+11	AFC	6–1	X
Albania	1	0	0	1	0	1	−1	UEFA	X	0–1
Algeria	4	2	0	2	5	5	0	CAF	2–1	1–2
Angola	4	2	2	0	7	2	+5	CAF	4–0	X
Argentina	2	0	1	1	1	2	−1	CONMEBOL	X	0–1
Armenia	1	1	0	0	3	1	+2	UEFA	3–1	X
Australia	6	3	2	1	7	6	+1	AFC / OFC	2–0	0–3
Austria	1	0	0	1	1	5	−4	UEFA	X	1–5
Azerbaijan	3	2	1	0	4	2	+2	UEFA	2–1	X
Bahrain	18	8	5	5	32	13	+19	AFC	6–0	2–4
Bangladesh	6	6	0	0	28	1	+27	AFC	6–0	X
Belgium	1	0	1	0	0	0	0	UEFA	X	X
Belarus	3	0	2	1	3	4	−1	UEFA	X	1–2
Bolivia	1	1	0	0	2	1	+1	CONMEBOL	2–1	X
Bosnia and Herzegovina	7	5	1	1	19	10	+9	UEFA	4–0	1–3
Botswana	1	0	1	0	1	1	0	CAF	X	X
Brazil	2	1	0	1	1	3	−2	CONMEBOL	1–0	0–3
Bulgaria	2	1	1	0	2	1	+1	UEFA	1–0	X
Burkina Faso	1	1	0	0	2	1	+1	CAF	2–1	X
Cambodia	4	4	0	0	28	1	+27	AFC	14–0	X
Cameroon	2	0	2	0	1	1	0	CAF	X	X
Canada	3	2	0	1	2	1	+1	CONCACAF	1–0	0–1
Cape Verde	1	0	1	0	0	0	0	CAF	X	X
Chile	3	1	1	1	4	3	+1	CONMEBOL	2–0	1–2
China	23	13	6	4	39	18	+21	AFC	4–0	0–2
Chinese Taipei	5	5	0	0	22	0	+22	AFC	6–0	X
Costa Rica	3	2	1	0	8	2	+6	CONCACAF	5–0	X
Croatia	2	0	1	1	2	4	−2	UEFA	X	0–2
Cyprus	1	0	1	0	0	0	0	UEFA	X	X
Czech Republic	1	0	0	1	0	1	−1	UEFA	X	0–1
Denmark	1	0	1	0	0	0	0	UEFA	X	X
Ecuador	3	0	2	1	2	3	−1	CONMEBOL	X	0–1
Egypt	2	0	2	0	2	2	0	CAF	X	X
England	1	0	0	1	2	6	−4	UEFA	X	2–6
Gambia	1	1	0	0	3	1	+2	CAF	3–1	X
France	1	0	0	1	1	2	−1	UEFA	X	1–2
Georgia	1	1	0	0	2	1	+1	UEFA	2–1	X
Germany	2	0	0	2	0	4	−4	UEFA	X	0–2
Ghana	2	2	0	0	5	0	+5	CAF	3–0	X
Guam	3	3	0	0	31	0	+31	AFC	19–0	X
Guatemala	1	0	1	0	2	2	0	CONCACAF	X	X
Guinea	2	0	1	1	2	3	−1	CAF	X	1–2
Hong Kong	9	9	0	0	23	3	+20	AFC	4–0	X
Hungary	3	0	0	3	1	6	−5	UEFA	X	0–2
Iceland	1	1	0	0	1	0	+1	UEFA	1–0	X
India	9	6	1	2	20	6	+14	AFC	4–0	1–3
Indonesia	6	5	1	0	16	3	+13	AFC	5–0	X
Iraq	29	16	7	6	38	22	+16	AFC	3–0	1–2
Ireland, Republic of	3	1	0	2	2	4	−2	UEFA	1–0	0–2
Israel	5	3	1	1	7	6	+1	UEFA / AFC	3–0	0–4
Jamaica	2	2	0	0	9	1	+8	CONCACAF	8–1	X
Japan	19	7	6	6	21	22	−1	AFC	2–0	0–3
Jordan	14	7	3	4	18	11	+7	AFC	4–1	2–3
Kazakhstan	2	2	0	0	5	0	+5	UEFA / AFC	3–0	X
Kenya	3	3	0	0	6	1	+5	CAF	3–0	X
Korea, North	20	16	4	0	34	9	+25	AFC	3–0	X
Korea, South	33	13	10	10	34	36	−2	AFC	6–2	0–5
Kuwait	30	13	10	7	39	31	+8	AFC	3–1	0–3
Kyrgyzstan	6	6	0	0	25	4	+21	AFC	7–0	X
Laos	3	3	0	0	20	1	+19	AFC	7–0	X
Lebanon	12	10	1	1	31	3	+28	AFC	5–0	0–1
Libya	1	1	0	0	4	0	+4	CAF	4–0	X
Lithuania	1	1	0	0	1	0	+1	UEFA	1–0	X
Macedonia, North	3	2	1	0	7	3	+4	UEFA	3–1	X
Madagascar	1	1	0	0	1	0	+1	CAF	1–0	X
Malaysia	4	4	0	0	8	0	+8	AFC	3–0	X
Maldives	6	6	0	0	42	0	+42	AFC	17–0	X
Mali	2	1	0	1	3	2	+1	CAF	2–0	1–2
Mauritania	1	1	0	0	2	0	+2	CAF	2–0	X
Mexico	3	0	0	3	2	9	−7	CONCACAF	X	0–4
Montenegro	2	1	1	0	2	1	+1	UEFA	2–1	X
Morocco	1	1	0	0	1	0	+1	CAF	1–0	X
Mozambique	1	1	0	0	3	0	+3	CAF	3–0	X
Myanmar	5	3	0	2	7	4	+3	AFC	3–1	0–1
Nepal	5	5	0	0	25	0	+25	AFC	8–0	X
Netherlands	1	0	0	1	0	3	−3	UEFA	X	0–3
New Zealand	3	1	2	0	5	2	+3	OFC	3–0	X
Nicaragua	1	1	0	0	1	0	+1	CONCACAF	1–0	X
Nigeria	3	0	1	2	1	3	−2	CAF	X	1–2
Oman	13	7	4	2	26	15	+11	AFC	4–0	2–4
Pakistan	14	12	1	1	58	10	+48	AFC	9–1	1–4
Palestine	7	5	2	0	20	3	+17	AFC	7–0	X
Panama	2	2	0	0	3	1	+2	CONCACAF	2–1	X
Papua New Guinea	1	1	0	0	8	1	+7	OFC	8–1	X
Paraguay	1	0	1	0	1	1	0	CONMEBOL	X	X
Peru	1	0	0	1	1	4	−3	CONMEBOL	X	1–4
Philippines	1	1	0	0	7	1	+6	AFC	7–1	X
Poland	2	0	0	2	0	3	−3	UEFA	X	0–2
Portugal	3	0	1	2	1	6	−5	UEFA	X	0–3
Qatar	27	17	5	5	47	21	+26	AFC	6–1	0–2
Romania	2	0	2	0	2	2	0	UEFA	X	X
Russia	7	1	2	4	4	9	−5	UEFA	1–0	0–2
Saudi Arabia	14	4	6	4	19	13	+6	AFC	3–0	3–4
Scotland	1	0	1	0	1	1	0	UEFA	X	X
Senegal	2	0	2	0	2	2	0	CAF	X	X
Serbia	3	0	1	2	1	4	−3	UEFA	X	1–3
Sierra Leone	1	1	0	0	4	0	+4	CAF	4–0	X
Singapore	3	2	1	0	10	2	+8	AFC	6–0	X
Slovakia	2	1	0	1	6	6	0	UEFA	4–3	2–3
Spain	1	0	0	1	0	1	−1	UEFA	X	0–1
Sri Lanka	2	2	0	0	11	0	+11	AFC	7–0	X
Sweden	1	0	0	1	1	3	−2	UEFA	X	1–3
Syria	31	18	12	1	53	16	+37	AFC	7–1	0–1
Tajikistan	5	4	1	0	16	3	+13	AFC	6–1	X
Tanzania	1	1	0	0	2	0	+2	CAF	2–0	X
Thailand	14	11	3	0	32	5	+27	AFC	5–0	X
Togo	2	2	0	0	4	0	+4	CAF	2–0	X
Trinidad and Tobago	2	2	0	0	3	0	+3	CONCACAF	2–0	X
Tunisia	2	0	1	1	2	3	−1	CAF	X	0–1
Turkey	6	0	2	4	2	13	−11	UEFA	X	1–6
Turkmenistan	10	5	3	2	16	8	+8	AFC	5–0	0–1
Uganda	1	0	1	0	2	2	0	CAF	X	X
Ukraine	1	1	0	0	1	0	+1	UEFA	1–0	X
United Arab Emirates	21	17	3	1	31	5	+26	AFC	3–0	1–3
United States	3	1	1	1	3	3	0	CONCACAF	2–1	0–1
Uruguay	2	1	1	0	2	1	+1	CONMEBOL	1–0	X
Uzbekistan	19	10	6	3	21	11	+10	AFC	4–0	1–3
Venezuela	3	2	1	0	3	1	+2	CONMEBOL	1–0	X
Vietnam	1	1	0	0	2	0	+2	AFC	2–0	X
Wales	2	1	0	1	2	1	+1	UEFA	2–0	0–1
Yemen	3	3	0	0	11	1	+10	AFC	5–0	X
Yemen, South	3	3	0	0	12	0	+12	AFC	8–0	X
Zambia	1	1	0	0	3	2	+1	CAF	3–2	X
Total	631	362	150	119	1209	496	+713			

- FIFA considers Russia as the inheritor of the records of Soviet Union.
- FIFA considers Serbia as the inheritor of the records of SFR Yugoslavia and FR Yugoslavia.
- FIFA considers Czech Republic as the inheritor of the records of Czechoslovakia.

== All Time General Statistics Record / Overview of Results ==
As of 17 November 2026

6*consists of only official international "A" Senior matches (not including Youth, B Team and club team results).

Tournament	M	W	D	L	GF	GA	GD	Points
FIFA World Cup	21	3	7	11	16	34	-18	16
FIFA World Cup Qualification	162	103	39	20	351	101	+250	348
AFC Asian Cup	74	45	20	9	143	55	+88	155
AFC Asian Cup Qualification *	54	41	8	5	150	30	+120	131
Olympics (not official)	9	2	1	6	6	20	-14	7
Olympics Qualification (not official)	22	14	6	2	48	8	+40	48
Asian Games	48	30	6	12	87	35	+52	96
West Asian Championship	28	19	7	2	56	16	+40	64
CAFA Nations Cup	7	5	1	1	20	6	+14	16
Total Official Matches (Exclude Olympics Qual and Olympics)	394	246	88	60	823	277	+546	826
RCD Cup / ECO Cup	11	8	1	2	27	10	+17	25
LG Cup	13	6	3	4	19	10	+9	21
Minor Tournament	45	22	11	12	86	38	+48	77
Special Friendly Match	2	0	2	0	2	2	0	2
Friendly Match**	165	77	46	41	247	159	+88	280
All of Friendly Matches and Other Tournaments	236	114	63	59	381	219	+162	405
Total Official and Friendly Matches	630	360	151	119	1204	496	+708	1231

- Excluding 2019 AFC Asian Cup Qual matches as they are counted in FIFA World Cup Qual (2018).
- Consists of only 2 sided team friendly match results (not including 3 and 4 nations cup and other friendly and Minor Tournament).

== Results by decades ==
As of 17 November 2026

Year	M	W	D	L	GF	GA	GD
1940s	2	1	1	0	4	0	+4
1950s	15	6	3	6	23	29	-6
1960s	22	14	4	6	43	22	+21
1970s	61	33	11	15	99	47	+52
1980s	62	36	15	11	124	38	+86
1990s	103	53	28	22	211	84	+127
2000s	166	92	44	30	313	141	+172
2010s	123	75	30	18	230	76	+154
2020s	76	50	15	11	157	59	+98
Total	630	360	151	119	1204	496	+708

== Results by years ==
As of 17 November 2026

=== 1941-1949 ===
Year	Pld	W	D	L	GF	GA	GD
1940	Did Not Play						
1941	1	0	1	0	0	0	0
1942	Did Not Play						
1943	Did Not Play						
1944	Did Not Play						
1945	Did Not Play						
1946	Did Not Play						
1947	Did Not Play						
1948	Did Not Play						
1949	1	1	0	0	4	0	+4
Total	2	1	1	0	4	0	+4

=== 1950-1959 ===
Year	Pld	W	D	L	GF	GA	GD
1950	2	1	0	1	6	7	−1
1951	4	2	1	1	5	3	+2
1952	1	0	1	0	0	0	0
1953	Did Not Play						
1954	Did Not Play						
1955	Did Not Play						
1956	Did Not Play						
1957	Did Not Play						
1958	2	0	0	2	0	9	−9
1959	6	3	1	2	12	10	+2
Total	15	6	3	6	23	29	−6

=== 1960-1969 ===
Year	Pld	W	D	L	GF	GA	GD
1960	Did Not Play						
1961	Did Not Play						
1962	2	0	1	1	2	3	–1
1963	Did Not Play						
1964	Did Not Play						
1965	2	1	1	0	4	1	+3
1966	8	4	1	3	9	6	+3
1967	2	1	0	1	2	1	+1
1968	4	4	0	0	11	2	+9
1969	4	3	0	1	15	8	+7
Total	22	13	3	6	43	21	+22

=== 1970-1979 ===
Year	Pld	W	D	L	GF	GA	GD
1970	3	1	1	1	9	3	+6
1971	2	1	0	1	2	2	0
1972	9	5	1	3	15	12	+3
1973	9	5	2	2	9	6	+3
1974	8	7	0	1	20	2	+18
1975	1	0	0	1	1	2	–1
1976	5	4	1	0	15	2	+13
1977	15	10	4	1	21	6	+15
1978	9	1	3	5	7	13	–6
1979	Did Not Play						
Total	61	34	12	15	99	48	+51

=== 1980-1989 ===
Year	Pld	W	D	L	GF	GA	GD
1980	8	5	2	1	21	6	+15
1981	Did Not Play						
1982	8	6	0	2	21	2	+19
1983	Did Not Play						
1984	12	8	4	0	30	5	+25
1985	3	1	0	2	2	5	–3
1986	9	6	1	2	22	4	+18
1987	Did Not Play						
1988	10	4	4	2	9	5	+4
1989	12	6	4	2	19	11	+8
Total	62	36	15	11	124	38	+86

=== 1990-1999 ===
Year	Pld	W	D	L	GF	GA	GD
1990	7	4	1	2	7	4	+3
1991	2	1	0	1	2	2	0
1992	8	3	4	1	14	3	+11
1993	15	9	3	3	33	15	+18
1994	4	1	2	1	5	2	+3
1995	Did Not Play						
1996	21	13	5	3	50	13	+37
1997	22	11	7	4	64	20	+44
1998	18	9	2	7	29	20	+9
1999	6	2	4	0	7	5	+2
Total	103	53	28	22	211	84	+127

=== 2000-2009 ===
Year	Pld	W	D	L	GF	GA	GD
2000	26	15	7	4	63	19	+44
2001	20	11	4	5	35	20	+15
2002	10	4	4	2	13	9	+4
2003	11	6	1	4	22	12	+10
2004	18	13	3	2	54	17	+37
2005	11	8	1	2	17	7	+10
2006	15	8	5	2	27	14	+13
2007	13	8	4	1	24	11	+13
2008	21	12	7	2	31	11	+20
2009	21	7	8	6	27	21	+6
Total	166	92	44	30	313	141	+172

=== 2010-2019 ===
Year	Pld	W	D	L	GF	GA	GD
2010	12	8	2	2	19	10	+9
2011	15	12	2	1	36	5	+31
2012	14	4	7	3	16	11	+5
2013	9	7	1	1	22	6	+16
2014	10	3	4	3	9	9	0
2015	15	10	4	1	33	10	+23
2016	10	8	2	0	27	2	+25
2017	11	7	3	1	14	6	+8
2018	15	9	3	3	19	10	+9
2019	12	7	2	3	35	7	+28
Total	123	75	30	18	230	76	+154

=== 2020-2029 ===
Year	Pld	W	D	L	GF	GA	GD
2020	2	2	0	0	4	1	+3
2021	11	10	1	0	31	3	+28
2022	11	6	1	4	12	12	0
2023	11	9	2	0	33	7	+26
2024	18	14	3	1	41	15	+26
2025	12	5	4	3	18	9	+9
2026	11	4	4	3	18	12	+6
2027	Future						
2028	Future						
2029	Future						
Total	76	50	15	11	157	59	+98

== FIFA World Ranking records ==
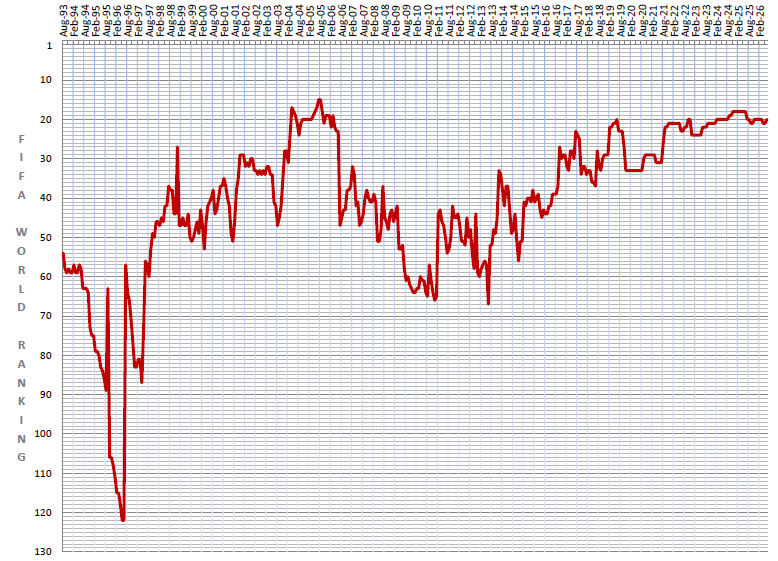
FIFA World Rankings for Iran, August 1993 – June 2026

Main: AFC National Team of the Year

9 (gold) , 10 (silver) , 2 (bronze) , 5 (Fourth Place) (26/32) (1993–2024)

Highest FIFA ranking
15 (July 2005)
Lowest FIFA ranking
122 (May 1996)
Best mover
65 (July 1996)
Worst mover
-43 (October 1995)

=== Ranking ===
As of 1 April 2026

Current Rank: 21 / Average Rank: 43 / Highest Rank: 15 / Lowest Rank: 122 / Biggest Climb: 65 / Biggest Fall: 43

#	Date	World Ranking	Asian Ranking	Points
1	31 Dec 1992	61	7	24
2	8 Aug 1993	54	7	32
3	23 Sep 1993	58	7	31
4	22 Oct 1993	59	8	30
5	19 Nov 1993	58	9	31
6	23 Dec 1993	59	8	31
7	15 Feb 1994	57	8	30
8	15 Mar 1994	59	8	30
9	19 Apr 1994	59	7	30
10	17 May 1994	57	6	30
11	14 Jun 1994	58	5	30
12	21 Jul 1994	63	7	24
13	13 Sep 1994	63	7	24
14	25 Oct 1994	64	9	27
15	22 Nov 1994	73	11	25
16	20 Dec 1994	75	11	25
17	20 Feb 1995	79	11	25
18	19 Apr 1995	80	11	24
19	16 May 1995	83	11	24
20	13 Jun 1995	84	11	24
21	25 Jul 1995	86	11	23
22	22 Aug 1995	89	11	23
23	19 Sep 1995	63	7	24
24	17 Oct 1995	106	14	18
25	21 Nov 1995	106	14	18
26	19 Dec 1995	108	15	17
27	24 Jan 1996	111	17	17
28	21 Feb 1996	115	21	16
29	24 Apr 1996	118	22	15
30	22 May 1996	122	22	15
31	3 Jul 1996	57	5	36
32	28 Aug 1996	64	7	35
33	25 Sep 1996	66	8	35
34	23 Oct 1996	71	8	34
35	20 Nov 1996	77	8	33
36	18 Dec 1996	83	10	33
37	27 Feb 1997	81	10	33
38	9 Apr 1997	87	12	33
39	14 May 1997	73	9	36
40	18 Jun 1997	56	6	43
41	16 Jul 1997	57	7	43
42	20 Aug 1997	60	7	43
43	17 Sep 1997	53	6	44
44	17 Oct 1997	49	6	46
45	19 Nov 1997	50	6	46
46	23 Dec 1997	46	6	47
47	18 Feb 1998	47	6	47
48	18 Mar 1998	45	6	47
49	22 Apr 1998	46	6	47
50	20 May 1998	42	5	48
51	15 Jul 1998	37	4	48
52	19 Aug 1998	38	4	48
53	16 Sep 1998	38	5	48
54	21 Oct 1998	44	6	46
55	18 Nov 1998	44	7	46
56	23 Dec 1998	27	4	54
57	27 Jan 1999	47	4	530
58	24 Feb 1999	47	4	528
59	24 Mar 1999	45	4	532
60	21 Apr 1999	47	4	531
61	19 May 1999	47	4	530
62	16 Jun 1999	44	4	537
63	21 July 1999	50	4	527
64	18 Aug 1999	51	4	526
65	15 Sep 1999	50	3	534
66	13 Oct 1999	48	3	537
67	17 Nov 1999	46	3	539
68	22 Dec 1999	49	2	525
69	19 Jan 2000	43	2	535
70	16 Feb 2000	47	2	536
71	15 Mar 2000	53	4	526
72	12 Apr 2000	46	3	544
73	10 May 2000	42	2	557
74	7 Jun 2000	41	1	560
75	5 Jul 2000	40	2	561
76	9 Aug 2000	38	2	561
77	6 Sep 2000	44	2	559
78	11 Oct 2000	43	1	561
79	15 Nov 2000	40	4	580
80	20 Dec 2000	37	2	585
81	17 Jan 2001	37	1	585
82	14 Feb 2001	35	2	587
83	14 Mar 2001	37	2	586
84	11 Apr 2001	40	2	581
85	16 May 2001	42	3	571
86	20 Jun 2001	49	4	570
87	16 Jul 2001	51	5	566
88	22 Aug 2001	46	4	585
89	19 Sep 2001	38	3	610
90	17 Oct 2001	35	3	621
91	21 Nov 2001	29	1	640
92	19 Dec 2001	29	1	642
93	16 Jan 2002	29	1	641
94	13 Feb 2002	32	1	639
95	20 Mar 2002	31	1	636
96	17 Apr 2002	32	1	634
97	15 May 2002	30	1	635
98	3 Jul 2002	33	3	634
99	14 Aug 2002	33	3	633
100	18 Sep 2002	34	3	633
101	23 Oct 2002	33	3	636
102	20 Nov 2002	34	3	630
103	18 Dec 2002	33	3	628
104	2003	0	0	0
105	2003	0	0	0
106	2003	0	0	0
107	2003	0	0	0
108	2003	0	0	0
109	2003	0	0	0
110	2003	0	0	0
111	2003	0	0	0
112	2003	0	0	0
113	2003	0	0	0
114	2003	0	0	0
115	2003	0	0	0
116	2004	0	0	0
117	2004	0	0	0
118	2004	0	0	0
119	2004	0	0	0
120	2004	0	0	0
121	2004	0	0	0
122	2004	0	0	0
123	2004	0	0	0
124	2004	0	0	0
125	2004	0	0	0
126	2004	0	0	0
127	2004	0	0	0
128	2005	0	0	0
129	2005	0	0	0
130	2005	0	0	0
131	2005	0	0	0
132	2005	0	0	0
133	2005	0	0	0
134	2005	0	0	0
135	2005	0	0	0
136	2005	0	0	0
137	2005	0	0	0
138	2005	0	0	0
139	2005	0	0	0
140	2006	0	0	0
141	2006	0	0	0
142	2006	0	0	0
143	2006	0	0	0
144	2006	0	0	0
145	2006	0	0	0
146	2006	0	0	0
147	2006	0	0	0
148	2006	0	0	0
149	2006	0	0	0
150	2006	0	0	0
151	2007	0	0	0
152	2007	0	0	0
153	2007	0	0	0
154	2007	0	0	0
155	2007	0	0	0
156	2007	0	0	0
157	2007	0	0	0
158	2007	0	0	0
159	2007	0	0	0
160	2007	0	0	0
161	2007	0	0	0
162	2007	0	0	0
163	2008	0	0	0
164	2008	0	0	0
165	2008	0	0	0
166	2008	0	0	0
167	2008	0	0	0
168	2008	0	0	0
169	2008	0	0	0
170	2008	0	0	0
171	2008	0	0	0
172	2008	0	0	0
173	2008	0	0	0
174	2008	0	0	0
175	2009	0	0	0
176	2009	0	0	0
177	2009	0	0	0
178	2009	0	0	0
179	2009	0	0	0
180	2009	0	0	0
181	2009	0	0	0
182	2009	0	0	0
183	2009	0	0	0
184	2009	0	0	0
185	2009	0	0	0
186	2009	0	0	0
187	2010	0	0	0
188	2010	0	0	0
189	2010	0	0	0
190	2010	0	0	0
191	2010	0	0	0
192	2010	0	0	0
193	2010	0	0	0
194	2010	0	0	0
195	2010	0	0	0
196	2010	0	0	0
197	2010	0	0	0
198	2011	0	0	0
199	2011	0	0	0
200	2011	0	0	0
201	2011	0	0	0
202	2011	0	0	0
203	2011	0	0	0
204	2011	0	0	0
205	2011	0	0	0
206	2011	0	0	0
207	2011	0	0	0
208	2011	0	0	0
209	2011	0	0	0
210	2012	0	0	0
211	2012	0	0	0
212	2012	0	0	0
213	2012	0	0	0
214	2012	0	0	0
215	2012	0	0	0
216	2012	0	0	0
217	2012	0	0	0
218	2012	0	0	0
219	2012	0	0	0
220	2012	0	0	0
221	2012	0	0	0
222	2013	0	0	0
223	2013	0	0	0
224	2013	0	0	0
225	2013	0	0	0
226	2013	0	0	0
227	2013	0	0	0
228	2013	0	0	0
229	2013	0	0	0
230	2013	0	0	0
231	2013	0	0	0
232	2013	0	0	0
233	2013	0	0	0
234	2014	0	0	0
235	2014	0	0	0
236	2014	0	0	0
237	2014	0	0	0
238	2014	0	0	0
239	2014	0	0	0
240	2014	0	0	0
241	2014	0	0	0
242	2014	0	0	0
243	2014	0	0	0
244	2014	0	0	0
245	2014	0	0	0
246	2015	0	0	0
247	2015	0	0	0
248	2015	0	0	0
249	2015	0	0	0
250	2015	0	0	0
251	2015	0	0	0
252	2015	0	0	0
253	2015	0	0	0
254	2015	0	0	0
255	2015	0	0	0
256	2015	0	0	0
257	2015	0	0	0
258	2016	0	0	0
259	2016	0	0	0
260	2016	0	0	0
261	2016	0	0	0
262	2016	0	0	0
263	2016	0	0	0
264	2016	0	0	0
265	2016	0	0	0
266	2016	0	0	0
267	2016	0	0	0
268	2016	0	0	0
269	2016	0	0	0
270	2017	0	0	0
271	2017	0	0	0
272	2017	0	0	0
273	2017	0	0	0
274	2017	0	0	0
275	2017	0	0	0
276	2017	0	0	0
277	2017	0	0	0
278	2017	0	0	0
279	2017	0	0	0
280	2017	0	0	0
281	2017	0	0	0
282	2018	0	0	0
283	2018	0	0	0
284	2018	0	0	0
285	2018	0	0	0
286	2018	0	0	0
287	2018	0	0	0
288	2018	0	0	0
289	2018	0	0	0
290	2018	0	0	0
291	2018	0	0	0
292	2018	0	0	0
293	2018	0	0	0
294	2019	0	0	0
295	2019	0	0	0
296	2019	0	0	0
297	2019	0	0	0
298	2019	0	0	0
299	2019	0	0	0
300	2019	0	0	0
301	2019	0	0	0
302	2020	0	0	0
303	2020	0	0	0
304	2020	0	0	0
305	2020	0	0	0
306	2020	0	0	0
307	2020	0	0	0
308	2020	0	0	0
309	2020	0	0	0
310	2021	0	0	0
311	2021	0	0	0
312	2021	0	0	0
313	2021	0	0	0
314	2021	0	0	0
315	2021	0	0	0
316	2021	0	0	0
317	2021	0	0	0
318	2022	0	0	0
319	2022	0	0	0
320	2022	0	0	0
321	2022	0	0	0
322	2022	0	0	0
323	2022	0	0	0
324	2023	0	0	0
325	2023	0	0	0
326	2023	0	0	0
327	2023	0	0	0
328	2023	0	0	0
329	2023	0	0	0
330	2023	0	0	0
331	2024	0	0	0
332	2024	0	0	0
333	2024	0	0	0
334	2024	0	0	0
335	2024	0	0	0
336	24 Oct 2024	19	2	1627.58
337	28 Nov 2024	18	2	1635.31
338	19 Dec 2024	18	2	1635.31
339	5 Apr 2025	17	2	1637.39
340	10 Jul 2025	20	2	1624.30
341	18 Sept 2025	21	2	1622.61
342	17 Oct 2025	21	2	1618.27
343	19 Nov 2025	20	2	1617.03
344	22 Dec 2025	20	2	1617.02
345	19 Jan 2026	21	2	1617.02
346	1 Apr 2026	21	2	1615.30
Best	-	15	1	-

- Australia in all dates was considered of Asian but joined to AFC in 2006.

== Unofficial matches ==
Matches against clubs not listed.

=== 1940s ===
Date	Opponent	Result	Score	Venue	Competition
16-Aug-41	Qandahar XI	W	5–0	Qandahar, Afghanistan	Friendly
23-Aug-41	Peshawar XI	W	1–0	Kabul, Afghanistan	Friendly
12-Mar-42	Polish Army of the East	L	1–3	Tehran	Friendly
November-42	British Army	W	1–0	Tehran	Friendly
26-Oct-47	Istanbul XI	L	1–3	Tehran	Friendly
28-Oct-48	Istanbul XI	D	1–1	Tehran	Friendly

=== 1950s ===
Date	Opponent	Result	Score	Venue	Competition
30-May-50	Ankara XI	D	2–2	Ankara, Turkey	Friendly
April-52	Punjab XI	W	3–1	Karachi, Pakistan	Friendly
23-May-55	Ankara XI	L	1-2	Tehran	Friendly
27-May-55	Ankara XI	W	2–1	Tehran	Friendly

=== 1960s ===
Date	Opponent	Result	Score	Venue	Competition
04-Oct-63	Pakistan	W	4–1	Tehran	1964 Olympic Games Qualifier
01-Nov-63	Pakistan	L	0–1	Lahore, Pakistan	1964 Olympic Games Qualifier
12-Dec-63	Iraq	W	4–0	Tehran	1964 Olympic Games Qualifier
03-Jan-64	Iraq	D	0–0	Baghdad, Iraq	1964 Olympic Games Qualifier
06-Jun-64	India	W	3–0	Tehran	1964 Olympic Games Qualifier
19-Jun-64	India	W	3–1	Kolkata, India	1964 Olympic Games Qualifier
2-Aug-64	Russia SFSR XI	L	0–1	Krasnodar, Soviet Union	Friendly
11-Oct-64	East Germany Olympic	L	0–4	Yokohama, Japan	1964 Olympic Games
13-Oct-64	Mexico Olympic	D	1–1	Shinjuku, Japan	1964 Olympic Games
14-Oct-64	Romania	L	0–1	Omiya, Japan	1964 Olympic Games

=== 1970s ===
Date	Opponent	Result	Score	Venue	Competition
03-Sep-70	Turkey XI	D	1–1	Tehran	1970 RCD Cup
25-Jun-71	Netherlands Olympic	W	3–0	Tehran	1971 Cyrus Tournament
27-Jun-71	Turkey Olympic	W	1–0	Tehran	1971 Cyrus Tournament
02-Jul-71	Austria Olympic	W	3–1	Tehran	1971 Cyrus Tournament
03-Dec-71	Kuwait	W	2–0	Tehran	1972 Olympic Games Qualifier
15-Jan-72	Kuwait	W	2–0	Athens, Greece	1972 Olympic Games Qualifier
03-May-72	North Korea	D	0–0	Pyongyang, North Korea	1972 Olympic Games Qualifier
26-May-72	North Korea	D	0–0	Tehran	1972 Olympic Games Qualifier
03-Jun-72	North Korea	W	2–0	Rawalpindi, Pakistan	1972 Olympic Games Qualifier
27-Aug-72	Hungary	L	0–5	Nuremberg, West Germany	1972 Olympic Games
29-Aug-72	Denmark	L	0–4	Augsburg, West Germany	1972 Olympic Games
31-Aug-72	Brazil Olympic	W	1–0	Regensburg, West Germany	1972 Olympic Games
17-Jan-74	Pakistan	W	2–1	Karachi, Pakistan	1974 RCD Cup
19-Jan-74	Turkey	L	0–1	Karachi, Pakistan	1974 RCD Cup
13-Jul-74	Soviet Union U23	W	1–0	Tehran	1974 Iran Cup
12-Jul-75	Poland U23	W	2–1	Tehran	1975 Iran Cup
15-Jul-75	Soviet Union U23	L	0–1	Tehran	1975 Iran Cup
20-Aug-75	Bahrain	W	3–0	Tehran	1976 Olympic Games Qualifier
22-Aug-75	Kuwait	D	1–1	Tehran	1976 Olympic Games Qualifier
24-Aug-75	Saudi Arabia	W	3–0	Tehran	1976 Olympic Games Qualifier
24-Aug-75	Iraq	D	1–1	Tehran	1976 Olympic Games Qualifier
28-May-76	Brazil Olympic	D	2–2	Shiraz	Friendly
25-Jun-76	Soviet Union U23	W	1–0	Tehran	Friendly
27-Jun-76	Soviet Union U23	D	2–2	Tehran	Friendly
16-Jul-76	France Olympic	W	4–3	Ottawa, Canada	Friendly
20-Jul-76	Cuba	W	1–0	Ottawa, Canada	1976 Olympic Games
22-Jul-76	Poland	L	2–3	Montreal, Canada	1976 Olympic Games
25-Jul-76	Soviet Union	L	1–2	Sherbrooke, Canada	1976 Olympic Games
01-Aug-77	Soviet Union U23	D	1–1	Tehran	Friendly
21-Oct-77	Hungary XI	W	3–1	Tehran	Friendly
22-Jun-79	Soviet Union XI	L	0–2	Moscow, Soviet Union	Friendly
25-Jun-79	Soviet Union XI	L	1–3	Tehran	Friendly

=== 1980s ===
Date	Opponent	Result	Score	Venue	Competition
25-Feb-80	North Korea	D	0–0	Singapore	1980 Olympic Games Qualifier
27-Feb-80	China PR	D	2–2	Singapore	1980 Olympic Games Qualifier
01-Mar-80	Singapore	W	3–0	Singapore	1980 Olympic Games Qualifier
07-Mar-80	India	W	2–0	Singapore	1980 Olympic Games Qualifier
09-Mar-80	Sri Lanka	W	11–0	Singapore	1980 Olympic Games Qualifier
12-Mar-80	Singapore	W	4–0	Singapore	1980 Olympic Games Qualifier
09-Mar-80	Sri Lanka	W	11–0	Singapore	1980 Olympic Games Qualifier
06-Mar-82	Pyongyang XI	W	2–0	Tehran	Friendly
25-Jun-84	China	L	0–1	Beijing, China	Friendly
24-Jan-85	China PR B	W	4–0	Kochi, India	1985 Nehru Cup
18-Feb-86	Poland U21	D	0–0	Tehran	1986 Fajr Cup
21-Feb-86	Poland U21	D	2–2	Tehran	1986 Fajr Cup
27-Feb-87	Kuwait	W	2–1	Doha, Qatar	1988 Olympic Games Qualifier
06-Mar-87	Kuwait	L	0–1	Doha, Qatar	1988 Olympic Games Qualifier
14-Oct-88	East Germany U19	L	0–1	Delitzsch, East Germany	Friendly
16-Oct-88	East Germany U21	L	0–3	Dessau, East Germany	Friendly
05-Sep-89	Poland XI	W	3–0	Tehran	Friendly
07-Sep-89	Poland XI	W	1–0	Tehran	Friendly

=== 1990s ===
Date	Opponent	Result	Score	Venue	Competition
18-Feb-90	Soviet Union B	L	0–1	Tehran	Friendly
20-Feb-90	Soviet Union B	L	0–1	Tehran	Friendly

=== 2000s ===
2002 Iran 2-2 Azerbaijan

Date	Opponent	Result	Score	Venue	Competition
12-Jan-00	Ecuador U23	W	2–1	Los Angeles, United States	Friendly
17-Jan-01	Italy U21	D	2–2	Tehran	2001 Civilization Cup
03-Mar-02	Algeria B	D	0–0	Casablanca, Morocco	2002 LG Cup
04-Apr-02	Palestine	D	2–2	Kuwait City, Kuwait	2002 West Asian Games
08-Apr-02	Qatar B	W	2–1	Kuwait City, Kuwait	2002 West Asian Games
10-Apr-02	Syria B	D	1–1	Kuwait City, Kuwait	2002 West Asian Games
12-Apr-02	Kuwait	D	0–0	Kuwait City, Kuwait	2002 West Asian Games
17-Sep-02	Morocco U23	D	1–1	Tabriz	2002 LG Cup
01-Feb-03	Denmark League XI	W	1–0	Hong Kong	2003 Lunar New Year Cup
30-May-03	Cameroon B	L	1–2	Abuja, Nigeria	2003 LG Cup
15-Aug-03	Cameroon B	W	4–1	Tehran	2003 LG Cup
11-Nov-05	Macedonia B	L	1–2	Tehran	Tehran Tournament
28-Jun-07	Ghana U23	W	4–2	Tehran	Friendly
27-Dec-08	Galicia	L	2–3	A Coruña, Spain	Friendly
23-Mar-09	Kuwait	W	1–0	Kuwait City, Kuwait	Friendly
26-May-09	Indonesia U23	W	5–0	Karaj	Friendly

=== 2010s ===
Date	Opponent	Result	Score	Venue	Competition
18-Apr-12	Mauritania	W	2–0	Tehran	Friendly
02-May-12	Mozambique	W	3–0	Karaj	Friendly

=== 2020s ===
Date	Opponent	Result	Score	Venue	Competition
16-Nov-22	Tunisia	L	0–2	Doha, Qatar	Friendly

== See also ==
- List of Iran international footballers
