= 2002 LG Cup =

2002 LG Cup may refer to:

- 2002 LG Cup (Morocco), an exhibition association football tournament, 1–3 March in Casablanca
- 2002 LG Cup (Russia), an exhibition association football tournament, 17–19 May in Moscow
- 2002 LG Cup (Iran), an exhibition association football tournament, 17–19 September in Tabriz
- 2002 LG Cup (snooker), the World Open, 5–13 October in Preston, England
