= 1971 Cyrus International Tournament =

1971 Cyrus International Cup
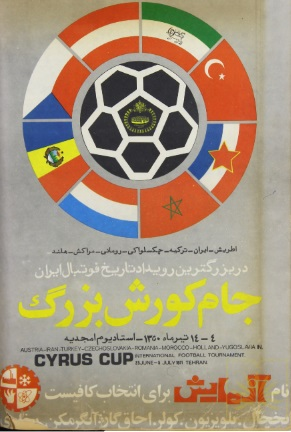

Tournament details
- Host country: Iran
- Dates: 25 June – 4 July
- Teams: 8 (from 3 confederations)
- Venue: 1 (in 1 host cities)

Final positions
- Champions: Iran (1st title)
- Runners-up: (Romania) Argeș Pitești
- Third place: Turkey U21
- Fourth place: Austria B

Tournament statistics
- Matches played: 16
- Goals scored: 32 (2 per match)
- Top scorer: (Iran) Safar Iranpak (4 goals)

The Cyrus International Tournament (Persian: تورنمنت بین المللی کورش) or simply Cyrus Cup (Persian: جام کورش) was a friendly football tournament held in Tehran, Iran between June 25 to July 4, 1971. As this tournament was held at the same year of the 2,500 year celebration of Iran's monarchy celebrating the foundation of Persian Empire by Cyrus the Great. The name Cyrus was given to the tournament.

This tournament was won by Iran who also managed to qualify from Asia for the 1972 Olympic Games the following year.

== Participating teams ==
The tournament's participating teams were from three confederations.

Iran	AFC
(Egypt) Zamalek SC	CAF
Morocco XI	CAF
Austria B	UEFA
(Czechoslovakia) FC Zbrojovka Brno	UEFA
Netherlands B	UEFA
Turkey U21	UEFA
(Romania) Argeș Pitești	UEFA

== Group stage ==
=== Group A ===
Team	Pts	Pld	W	D	L	GF	GA	GD
Iran	6	3	3	0	0	6	1	+5
Turkey U21	3	3	1	1	1	2	2	0
(Czechoslovakia) FC Zbrojovka Brno	2	3	0	2	1	2	3	-1
Netherlands B	1	3	0	1	2	2	6	-4

25 June 1971

Iran	3–0	Netherlands B
Behzadi 34'; Iranpak 59'; Jabbari 77'

Amjadieh Stadium, Tehran
Attendance: 22,000
Referee: Walker (England)
25 June 1971

Turkey U21	0–0	(Czechoslovakia) FC Zbrojovka Brno

Amjadieh Stadium, Tehran
Attendance: 22,000
Referee: Larva (Belgium)

27 June 1971

Iran	1–0	Turkey U21
Jabbari 19'

Amjadieh Stadium, Tehran
Attendance: 15,000
Referee: Walker (England)
27 June 1971

Netherlands B	1–1	(Czechoslovakia) FC Zbrojovka Brno
Verheuvel 66'		Kotásek 14'

Amjadieh Stadium, Tehran
Attendance: 15,000
Referee: Eschweiler (Germany)

29 June 1971

Iran	2–1	(Czechoslovakia) FC Zbrojovka Brno
Mazloomi 31'; Iranpak 79'		Konečný 38'

Amjadieh Stadium, Tehran
Attendance: 22,000
Referee: Larva (Belgium)
29 June 1971

Netherlands B	1–2	Turkey U21
Gritter 56'		Tuncer 41', 59' (pen.)

Amjadieh Stadium, Tehran
Attendance: 10,000
Referee: Eschweiler (Germany)

=== Group B ===
Team	Pts	Pld	W	D	L	GF	GA	GD
(Romania) Argeș Pitești	5	3	2	1	0	4	0	+4
Austria B	4	3	2	0	1	4	6	-1
Morocco XI	3	3	1	1	1	1	1	0
(Egypt) Zamalek SC	0	3	0	0	3	2	5	-3

26 June 1971

Austria B	0–3	(Romania) Argeș Pitești
		Jerkan 40'; Frotila 53'; Borjil 89'

Amjadieh Stadium, Tehran
Attendance: 8,000
Referee: Mozoun (Iran)
26 June 1971

Morocco XI	1–0	(Egypt) Zamalek SC
Bamous 72'

Amjadieh Stadium, Tehran
Attendance: 8,000
Referee: Abolhassan (Iran)

28 June 1971

Austria B	3–2	(Egypt) Zamalek SC
Wallner 11'; Kreisern 15'; Hruby 19'		El-Shazly 54'; Shehata 81'

Amjadieh Stadium, Tehran
Attendance: 6,000
Referee: Barazandeh (Iran)
28 June 1971

Argeș Pitești (Romania)	0–0	Morocco XI

Amjadieh Stadium, Tehran
Attendance: 7,000
Referee: Namdar (Iran)

30 June 1971

Austria B	1–0	Morocco XI
Knorrek 27'

Amjadieh Stadium, Tehran
Attendance: 2,000
Referee: Danaeifard (Iran)
30 June 1971

Argeș Pitești (Romania)	1–0	(Egypt) Zamalek SC
		Unseko 83'

Amjadieh Stadium, Tehran
Attendance: 2,000
Referee: Heidari (Iran)

== Knockout stage ==
=== Bracket ===
Semi-finals
2 July – Tehran
Iran	3
Austria B	1
2 July – Tehran
(Romania) Argeș Pitești	1
Turkey U23	0

Final
4 July – Tehran
Iran	1
(Romania) Argeș Pitești	0
Third place
4 July – Tehran
Turkey U21	2
Austria B	1

=== Semi finals ===
2 July 1971

Iran	3–1	Austria B
Behzadi 19'; Iranpak 27'; Sharafi 56'		Knorrek 22'

Amjadieh Stadium, Tehran
Attendance: 28,000
Referee: Walker (England)
2 July 1971

Argeș Pitești (Romania)	1–0	Turkey U21
Jerkan 78'

Amjadieh Stadium, Tehran
Attendance: 28,000
Referee: Eschweiler (Germany)

=== Third place match ===
4 July 1971

Turkey U21	2–1	Austria B
Cetin 3'; Fereydoun 84'		Fulhais 19'

Amjadieh Stadium, Tehran
Attendance: 30,000
Referee: Mozoun (Iran)

=== Final ===
4 July 1971

Iran	1–0	(Romania) Argeș Pitești
Iranpak 56'

Amjadieh Stadium, Tehran
Attendance: 30,000
Referee: Larva (Brlgium)

== Top scorers ==
- (Iran) Safar Iranpak
