= Ali Daei =

Iranian footballer and manager (born 1969)

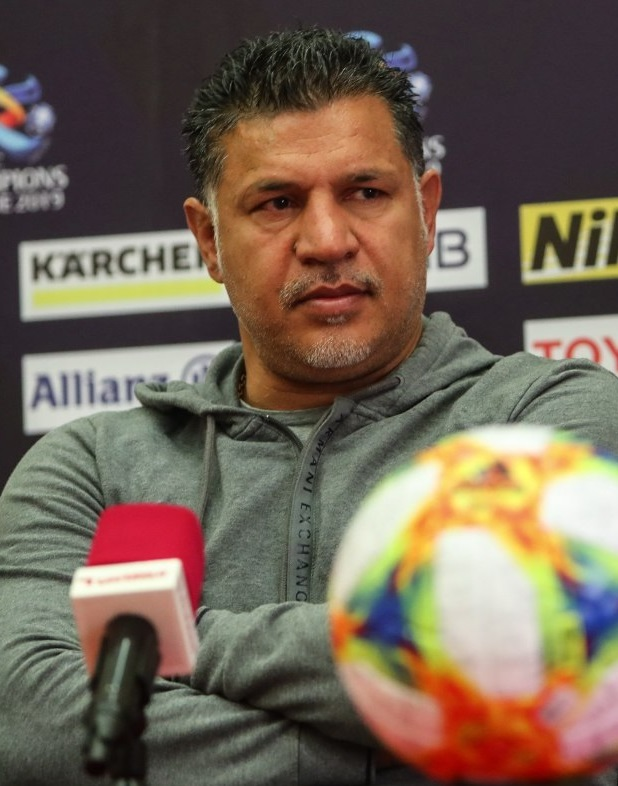
- Daei in 2019

Personal information
- Full name: Ali Daei
- Date of birth: 21 March 1969 (age 57)
- Place of birth: Ardabil, Iran
- Height: 1.89 m (6 ft 2 in)
- Position: Centre forward

Youth career
- 1983–1987: Esteghlal Ardabil

Senior career*
Years	Team	Apps	(Gls)
1987–1989	Esteghlal Ardabil		
1989–1990	Taxirani	20	(14)
1990–1994	Bank Tejarat	75	(49)
1994–1996	Persepolis	38	(23)
1996–1997	Al Sadd	16	(10)
1997–1998	Arminia Bielefeld	25	(7)
1998–1999	Bayern Munich	23	(6)
1999–2002	Hertha BSC	59	(6)
2002–2003	Al Shabab	21	(11)
2003–2004	Persepolis	28	(16)
2004–2006	Saba Battery	51	(23)
2006–2007	Saipa	26	(10)
Total		382	(175)

International career
1993–2006	Iran (Note: The match against Ecuador Olympic team was considered official for two decades before Ecuador FA reconsidered.)	148	(108)
2002	Iran Olympic (Wild Card)	3	(3)

Managerial career
- 2006–2008: Saipa
- 2007: Iran (Students)
- 2008–2009: Iran
- 2009–2011: Persepolis
- 2011–2013: Rah Ahan
- 2013–2014: Persepolis
- 2015–2016: Saba Qom
- 2016–2017: Naft Tehran
- 2017–2019: Saipa
Medal record
Men's football
Representing Iran (as player)
AFC Asian Cup
Third place	1996 United Arab Emirates
Third place	2004 China
Asian Games
Gold medal – first place	1998 Bangkok	Team
Gold medal – first place	2002 Busan	Team
AFC–OFC Challenge Cup
Winner	2003 Iran
WAFF Championship
Winner	2004 Iran
Representing Iran (as manager)
WAFF Championship
Winner	2008 Iran
- * Club domestic league appearances and goals

Ali Daei (Note: Persian: علی دایی, pronounced [ʔæliː dɑːjiː]) (born 21 March 1969) is an Iranian former professional footballer and manager who played as a striker. He was the captain of the Iranian national team between 2000 and 2006 and played in the Bundesliga for Arminia Bielefeld, Bayern Munich and Hertha Berlin. He is regarded as the greatest Iranian footballer of all time as well as one of the greatest footballers from Asia. Daei was the all-time Asian men's top goal scorer in international football (108).

A tall forward, Daei was a prolific goal-scorer, who was known for his heading accuracy and ability in the air. He was the world's top international goal-scorer with 108 goals until his record was broken by Cristiano Ronaldo in 2021 and went to third after being surpassed again by Lionel Messi in 2024. During his playing career, Daei was appointed a UNICEF Goodwill Ambassador in 2001. Following his retirement, Daei served as a member of the FIFA Football Committee between 2007 and 2013. In 2014, he was inducted into the Asian Football Hall of Fame.

== Club career ==
=== Early years ===
Daei was born in Ardabil, Imperial Iran, to an Iranian Azerbaijani family. Daei graduated from Aryamehr University of Technology in Materials Engineering (Metallurgical) with a BSc. degree. He began his playing career at 19 with his hometown club Esteghlal Ardabil. His next club was Taxirani F.C. in Tehran, where he played for one season, before joining another Tehran-based club, Bank Tejarat. His tenure with Bank Tejarat lasted four years, scoring 49 goals in 75 games.

=== Move to Europe ===
After his success with Bank Tejarat FC, in 1994, Daei joined one of Tehran's leading clubs, Persepolis. He scored 23 goals in 38 games for the club from 1994 to 1996. Following his impressive performance in the Asian Cup in 1996, he moved to Al Sadd for the 1996–1997 season before joining Bundesliga side Arminia Bielefeld in 1997 alongside fellow Iranian national teammate Karim Bagheri.

Yet at Bayern, he found himself low in the pecking order. This, coupled with the Iranian national team's scheduling, Daei had found very little time for playing. Daei was unhappy with his club position and decided to move to Hertha BSC before the end of his three-year contract when Bayern won the championship title in the 1999 Bundesliga.

Daei became the first Asian player to feature in a UEFA Champions League match. He scored his first and second goal in the UEFA Champions League on 21 September 1999 in a group stage match against Chelsea, won by Hertha 2–1. He also scored in a 1–1 draw against A.C. Milan at the San Siro. At Hertha he was a hugely influential player since he was only one of the squad's many successful players, who were to fulfill Hertha's Bundesliga and UEFA Champions League dreams.

=== Return to Asia ===
Daei was playing in numerous continental friendlies against world-class opposition, yet was still unable to maintain a stable position in his club's starting line-up. In 2001, he was not among the top scorers in the Asian Qualifying round and he did not manage to take the team into the World Cup as captain for the first time. He joined the UAE league at 34 years of age, signing a contract with Al-Shabab as a free agent. In 2003, Daei quit the UAE team and joined his team in Tehran, Persepolis. Daei moved from Persepolis to Saba Battery on a free transfer for a modest contract of around $300,000.

He spent two years at Saba Battery, scoring 23 goals, winning the Hazfi Cup and participating in the Asian Champions League. After World Cup 2006 and the arrival of Saba Battery's new manager, Farhad Kazemi, it was announced that he was no longer needed on the team and his contract would not be renewed. Despite rumors of retirement, he signed for another industry-linked club from Tehran, Saipa, on 1 August 2006.

On 6 March 2007, Ali Daei was fined $2000 and suspended for four games by the Iranian Football Federation after the incidents in a league game where he delivered a head-butt to the face of Sheys Rezaei.

On 28 May 2007, after Saipa won the 2006–07 Persian Gulf Cup in a match vs Mes Kerman, Daei announced his retirement from playing club football and that he would concentrate on his coaching career.

== International career ==
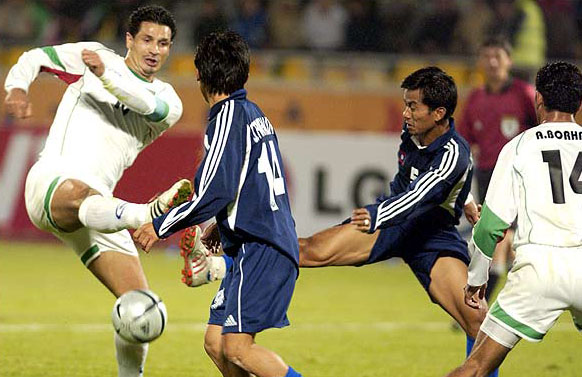
Daei (left) in action against Laos in an international game, 2004

Daei was named the World's top scorer in official international competitions by the International Federation of Football History and Statistics (IFFHS), having scored 20 goals in competitive matches for Iran in 1996, including his famous four-goal haul against South Korea in Asian Cup 1996. By the end of the 1996 Asian Cup, he had scored 29 goals in 38 appearances for Iran. In the 1998 World Cup qualifying campaign, he was again on top of the charts, scoring nine goals in 17 matches for Iran, reaching at that time, 38 goals in 52 appearances for his country.

Daei joined the exclusive circle of players with a century of caps. In a 28 November 2003 Asian Cup qualifier in Tehran against Lebanon, he scored his 85th international goal, elevating him past the Hungarian Ferenc Puskás to top the all-time list of scorers in international matches. On 17 November 2004, he scored four goals against Laos in a World Cup qualifier, giving him 102 goals and making him the first male player to score 100 goals in international play. He has 148 caps for Iran and, as of December 2025, is ranked joint 48th among the world's most capped players list.

Daei made his debut for Team Melli at the 1993 ECO Cup tournament held in Tehran. He continued his national team appearances and was named the top scorer of the final Asian round of 1994 FIFA World Cup qualifications with four goals in 5 matches.

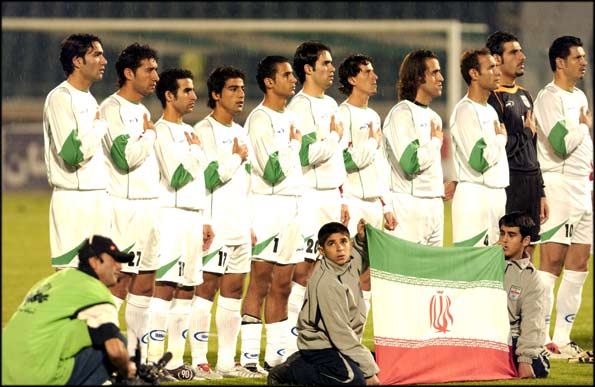
Iran at FIFA World Cup Qualifier 2006

On 17 November 2004, Daei became the first male footballer with 100 international goals when he scored four times against Laos in a 2006 FIFA World Cup qualifier.

Despite criticism, Daei played in the 2006 FIFA World Cup; the complaints, however, were directed more at his fitness and the inability of younger players to play a part in the World Cup. From Iranian media calling for his retirement, Ali Daei has always defended his position in Team Melli and has rejected that he was too old to play for the team.

Daei ended his international career with 109 goals (since downgraded to 108), an all-time record which stood until September 2021 when it was surpassed by Portuguese striker Cristiano Ronaldo. "I am honoured that this remarkable achievement will belong to Ronaldo," Daei wrote on Instagram.

== College career ==
Daei captained Islamic Azad University football team in 2007 World Interuniversity Games, scoring a hat-trick in the final match against University of Osijek and winning the gold medal.

=== Coaching ===
In the 2007 Summer Universiade, Daei was in charge as the head coach of the Iran student's national team.

He was technical manager of the Islamic Azad University team in the 2009 World Interuniversity Games.

== Managerial career ==
=== Saipa ===
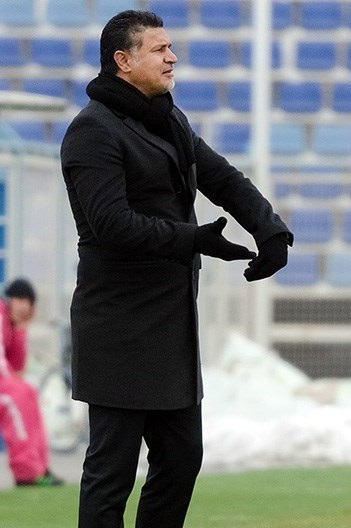
Daei at the game Gostaresh vs Saba Qom

On 8 October 2006, upon the sudden leave of Saipa's German coach Werner Lorant, he was appointed as the interim manager of Saipa. He was later officially announced as the full-time manager. On 28 May, Saipa became the Persian Gulf Cup champions in Daei's first season at the helm. Going into his second season as manager, Daei relinquished his playing duties for the defending champions and found himself on the sidelines full-time. The results of Saipa's 2007–2008 campaign were not nearly as successful as his team finished 11th in the 18 teams Iran Pro League table. However, Daei did lead Saipa to an Asian Champions League quarterfinal berth before leaving to take over as the full-time manager of the Iranian national football team.

=== Iran national football team ===
On 2 March 2008, IRIFF officially appointed Ali Daei as Team Melli's new head coach. Despite admitting that his appointment as manager of the Iranian national team was a "surprise", Daei refused to leave his current coaching job at Saipa F.C., therefore taking on dual managerial careers until after Saipa had entered the Asian Champion League quarterfinals, after which Daei left Saipa by mutual consent. While Daei guided Iran to a respectable 16–6–3 mark, his third loss on 28 March 2009 to a Saudi Arabian team that was down 1–0 to Iran in Tehran proved to be the final straw.

During his tenure as the National Team coach, the Iranian team managed the weakest World Cup Qualification results, with only one win out of 5 WCQ games. After the loss in the 2010 World Cup Qualifier, Daei was fired as head coach after the match. While introducing many new players, such as Gholamreza Rezaei, and Ehsan Hajsafi, Daei's squad was often in flux as to who would be invited to a fixture. Many critics also pointed towards the failures of Daei's team to score and an unsolved weakness in the central defense as causes for his downfall.

=== Persepolis ===
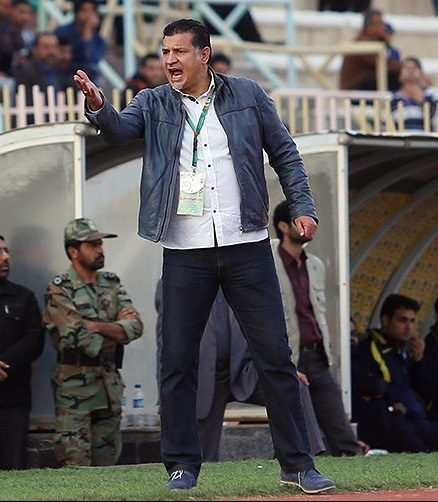
Daei coaching Persepolis in a match against Naft Tehran, 23 August 2013

In 2009, Daei turned down a job offer as manager of Rah Ahan. It was widely believed that Daei could be next-in-line for the coaching position of Persepolis. Still, the club chose Zlatko Kranjčar. On 28 December 2009, Daei was chosen as a coach of Persepolis. At the end of the 2009–10 Season, Persepolis finished fourth in the league, but they became Hazfi Cup champions. In the Hazfi Cup final, Persepolis defeated Azadegan League side Gostaresh Foolad Tabriz 4–1 on aggregate to qualify for the 2011 AFC Champions League. In the 2010–11 season, Persepolis finished fourth in the league and was eliminated in the group stage of the 2011 AFC Champions League but at the end of the season, Persepolis won the 2010–11 Hazfi Cup after defeating rivals Sepahan, Foolad and Malavan. Daei had many people against him while at Persepolis, including the chairman Habib Kashani and after contention with Kashani, he stated that "I won't work with Kashani Anymore".

On 20 June 2011, Technical committee of Persepolis re-appointed Daei as Persepolis's head coach but he resigned on 21 June. The technical committee chose Hamid Estili as Daei's successor on that day. During his time at Persepolis, Daei brought up many youngsters such as Hamidreza Ali Asgari and Saman Aghazamani and other players such as Hadi Norouzi and Maziar Zare were chosen for Team Melli thanks to Daei. Despite the fact that many challenges and difficulties, such as the leaders of fans and the clubs' Chairman Kashani were in Daei's way, Persepolis was crowned Hazfi Cup Champions for two successive years, and the fans themselves always loved and cheered Daei. Still, at the same time, they did not cheer for any player. Under the management of Daei, Persepolis won back-to-back trophies for the first time in 13 seasons.

=== Rah Ahan ===
On 14 July 2011, Daei signed a one-year contract as head coach of Rah Ahan. In his first match as head coach of Rah Ahan, he made a 2–2 draw with Zob Ahan. In his first season as Rah Ahan's head coach, he led the club to the 11th position.

During the 2012–13 season, Ali Daei used many young players such as Mojtaba Shiri and Omid Alishah. Rah Ahan finished the season in 8th place, the clubs' best finish in the league since 1937. Thanks to Daei's popularity, more people started to watch Rah Ahan's matches, and for the second straight year, Daei beat his former club Persepolis.

Despite many rumors that Daei will leave Rah Ahan for other clubs such as Persepolis or Tractor, he decided to stay with the club "to build a team that can qualify for the AFC Champions League." However, his contract was terminated on 20 May 2013, making way for him to become head coach of Persepolis.

=== Return to Persepolis ===
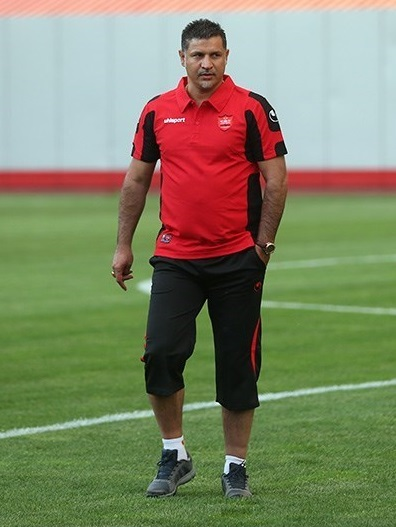
Daei in Persepolis training

On 20 May 2013, he signed a three-year contract to become head coach of Persepolis after a long negotiation. It was the second time that he signed with Persepolis, he returned to his former side after two seasons. He officially began his work with Persepolis on 1 June 2013. His first match came against Tractor, which Persepolis won 1–0, with the goal coming from Mehdi Seyed Salehi. At the end of his first year at Persepolis, his side finished runners-up, two points less than the champions Foolad.

He was sacked on 10 September 2014 after a poor start of 2014–15 season.

=== Saba Qom ===
On 1 July 2015, Daei became head coach of Saba Qom, signing a two-year contract. In two seasons with Saba, he finished ninth and seventh in the Persian Gulf Pro League. He left Saba a few weeks before the 2016–17 season due to uncertainty in the Saba's ownership situation.

=== Naft Tehran ===
Daei became manager of Naft Tehran on 5 July 2016 by signing a two-year contract, replacing Alireza Mansourian. He led Naft to the Hazfi Cup title. Still, he left the club at the end of the season.

=== Return to Saipa ===
Daei became manager of Saipa on 14 May 2017, a club where he started his coaching career in 2006 and led them to the league title in 2007. He led the club for two seasons and was sacked at the end of 2018–19 season.

== 2022 FIFA World Cup draw ==
Daei was one of the personnel involved in the 2022 FIFA World Cup draw held in Qatar on 1 April 2022.

== Personal life ==
=== Relationships ===
Iranian journalist Camelia Entekhabifard wrote in her memoirs that she married Daei in 1997, but the couple separated.

=== Business ventures and philanthropy ===
Daei owns his own football jersey manufacturing company called Daei Sport's Wears & Equipments, making sportswear for Iranian sporting clubs in various fields and league clubs worldwide. His company also made jerseys for the national team. He has made significant charitable donations and has made appearances in charity football matches worldwide (featuring in the World vs. Bosnia match with Roberto Baggio and others). He also appeared in a UNICEF commercial with David Beckham and Madeleine Albright, and has regularly been seen working with the organization.

Daei featured on 18 July 2007 in 90 Minutes for Mandela, a match between the Africa XI and the Rest of the World XI to celebrate the birthday of Nelson Mandela. Daei played approximately 10 minutes in the match which ended 3–3.

=== Religion ===
Daei is a follower of Shia Islam. While he played for Bayern Munich, he refused to hold a glass of beer for an Erdinger advertisement because alcoholic beverages are forbidden in his religion.

=== Autobiography ===
In April 2008, Daei announced that he had begun writing an autobiography, due to be released in March 2010, and that despite reflecting on "bitter and sweet memories," he stated he would "keep some of his secrets in his heart forever". The book has not yet been released.

=== Accident ===
On 17 March 2012, Daei's car overturned while driving back to Tehran from Isfahan with his brother. Just before the accident, his team, Rah Ahan, had been beaten by Sepahan. Daei was then transferred to a hospital near Kashan. Rah Ahan's Media Officer, Hossein Ghadousi stated that "Daei is in a stable condition with regards to his vital signs and is not currently in any acute danger as a result of the accident". He was transferred to Laleh hospital in Tehran the following day.

A statement from the Asian Football Confederation (AFC) said: "The AFC wishes Iranian legend Ali Daei, who was involved in a car accident on Saturday, a speedy and full recovery. We stand ready to assist Daei, a true icon of Asian football. Our thoughts and prayers are with him." Sepp Blatter, President of FIFA, said on his personal Twitter page that he was shocked to hear Daei was injured. He also wished for his recovery.

=== Street attack ===
In November 2020, Daei was attacked by two thieves while they were trying to steal his gold necklace in Tehran.

Police announced that the two thieves were arrested a few days after they attacked Daei.

=== Politics and activism ===
On 26 December 2022, Daei said that an international flight carrying his wife, Mona Farrokhazari, and daughter, which was heading to Dubai was forced to return to Kish Island, due to his support for anti-government protests. In March 2026, Tehran's city council announced it will rename Ali Daei Boulevard to remove Daei's name. According to the council's spokesperson, this is because he stayed silent during the 2025–2026 Iranian protests and the 2026 Iran war.

== Career statistics ==
=== Club ===
Country	Club	Season	League			National Cup		Continental		Other		Total	
Country	Club	Season	Division	Apps	Goals	Apps	Goals	Apps	Goals	Apps	Goals	Apps	Goals
Iran	Persepolis	1994–95	Azadegan League	25	15	0		—				25	15
Iran	Persepolis	1995–96	Azadegan League	13	8	—		4 (Note: Appearances in Asian Club Championship)	2	2 (Note: Appearances in Naghsh-e-Jahan Cup)	1	19	11
Iran	Persepolis	Total		38	23	0		4	2	2	1	44	26
Qatar	Al Sadd	1996–97	QSL	16	10	2	0	—				18	10
Qatar	Al Sadd	Total		16	10	2	0	—				18	10
Germany	Arminia Bielefeld	1997–98	Bundesliga	25	7	1	0	—		—		26	7
Germany	Bayern Munich	1998–99	Bundesliga	23	6	4	0	5 (Note: Appearances in UEFA Champions League)	0	—		32	6
Germany	Hertha BSC	1999–2000	Bundesliga	28	3	2	0	13	4	1 (Note: Appearance(s) in DFB-Ligapokal)	0	44	7
Germany	Hertha BSC	2000–01	Bundesliga	23	3	2	0	5 (Note: Appearance(s) in UEFA Cup)	2	2	0	32	5
Germany	Hertha BSC	2001–02	Bundesliga	8	0	3	0	1	0	—		12	0
Germany	Hertha BSC	Total		59	6	7	0	19	6	3	0	88	12
UAE	Al Shabab	2002–03	UPL	21	11	0		—				21	11
UAE	Al Shabab	Total		21	11	0		—				21	11
Iran	Persepolis	2003–04	Iran Pro League	28	16	2	1	—				30	17
Iran	Saba Battery	2004–05	Iran Pro League	25	12	5	3	—				30	15
Iran	Saba Battery	2005–06	Iran Pro League	26	11	2	2	6	5	1	2	35	20
Iran	Saba Battery	Total		51	23	7	5	6	5	1	2	65	35
Iran	Saipa	2006–07	Iran Pro League	26	10	1	0	—				27	10
Iran	Saipa	Total		26	10	1	0	—				27	10
	Career total			287	112	24	6	34	13	6	3	351	134

=== International ===
Appearances and goals by national team and year
National team	Year	Apps	Goals
Iran	1993	16	7
Iran	1994	1	0
Iran	1995	0	0
Iran	1996	18	22
Iran	1997	17	9
Iran	1998	13	9
Iran	1999	5	2
Iran	2000	18	19
Iran	2001	16	10
Iran	2002	4	2
Iran	2003	9	5
Iran	2004	16	17
Iran	2005	9	4
Iran	2006	6	2
Total		148	108

== Managerial statistics ==
As of 12 February 2019

Team	From	To	Record							
Team	From	To	G	W	D	L	GF	GA	+/-	Win %
Saipa	1 October 2006	1 June 2008	67	27	21	19	77	69	+8	40.30
Iran	1 March 2008	30 March 2009	25	16	6	3	42	15	+27	64.00
Persepolis	28 December 2009	22 June 2011	64	33	14	17	94	71	+23	51.56
Rah Ahan	14 July 2011	31 May 2013	69	21	25	23	80	79	+1	30.43
Persepolis	1 June 2013	10 September 2014	40	20	11	9	49	26	+23	50.00
Saba Qom	1 July 2015	3 July 2016	31	10	15	6	32	25	+7	32.26
Naft Tehran	5 July 2016	13 May 2017	36	15	11	10	46	36	+10	41.67
Saipa	14 May 2017	1 May 2019	51	24	17	10	68	62	+6	47.06
Total			380	161	119	100	484	377	+107	42.37

== Honours ==
=== Player ===
Persepolis

- Azadegan League: 1995–96

Bayern Munich

- Bundesliga: 1998–99
- DFB-Ligapokal: 1998
- UEFA Champions League runner-up: 1998–99

Saba Battery

- Hazfi Cup: 2004–05
- Iranian Super Cup: 2005

Saipa

- Persian Gulf Cup: 2006–07

Iran U23

- Asian Games Gold Medal: 2002

Iran

- ECO Cup: 1993
- LG Cup (3): 2001, 2002 March, 2002 September; third place (3): 2000, 2003 May, 2003 August
- Asian Games Gold Medal: 1998
- AFC–OFC Challenge Cup: 2003
- WAFF Championship: 2004

=== Manager ===
Saipa

- Iran Pro League: 2006–07

Iran

- WAFF Championship: 2008

Persepolis

- Hazfi Cup: 2009–10, 2010–11

Naft Tehran

- Hazfi Cup: 2016–17

=== Individual ===
- AFC Asian Cup Team of the Tournament: 1996
- AFC Asian Cup top goalscorer: 1996
- AFC Asian Player of the Month: August 1997
- AFC Asian Footballer of the Year: 1999
- IFFHS World's Top Goal Scorer: 2000 (20 goals)
- Order of Courage: 2005
- Asian Football Hall of Fame: 2014
- IFFHS Legends: 2016
- AFC Asian Cup Fans' All Time Best XI: 2018
- IFFHS Asian Men's Team of the 20th Century: 1901–2000
- Iranian Manager of the Year: 2006
- Nominated for FIFA World Player of the Year: 1997, 2001
- AFC Asian Cup All-time XI: 2023

== See also ==
- List of men's footballers with 100 or more international caps
- List of top international men's football goal scorers by country
- List of men's footballers with 50 or more international goals
- Glyptothorax alidaeii

== Notes ==
Awards and achievements
Preceded by Amir Ghalenoei	Iran Pro League Winning Manager; 2006–07	Succeeded by Afshin Ghotbi

Sporting positions
Preceded by Javad Zarincheh	Iran national football team captain 2000–2006	Succeeded by Mehdi Mahdavikia

Awards and achievements
Preceded by Amir Ghalenoei	Iran Pro League winning manager 2006–07	Succeeded by Afshin Ghotbi
