= List of Iran international footballers =

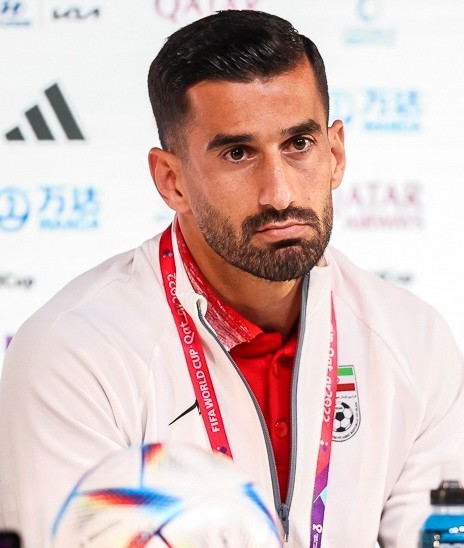
Ehsan Hajsafi is Iran's most capped player international of all time with 150 caps.

The Iran national football team has represented Iran in international football since 1941. Organized by the Football Federation Islamic Republic of Iran, it is one of the 47 members of the Asian Football Confederation. The team's first international was a 0–0 draw with Afghanistan on 25 August 1941.

== Players ==
As of match played 17 November 2026

Key
**Bold**	Played for the national team in the past year

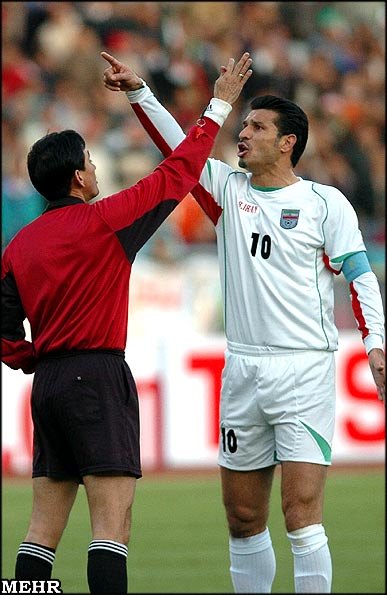
Ali Daei is Iran's record goalscorer with 108 goals from 148 caps.

Iran national team footballers with at least 40 appearances
Rank	Player	National career	Caps	Goals
1	**Ehsan Hajsafi**	2008–	150	7
2	Javad Nekounam	2000–2015	149	38
3	Ali Daei	1993–2006	148	108
4	Ali Karimi	1998–2012	127	38
5	Seyed Jalal Hosseini	2007–2018	115	8
6	**Mehdi Taremi**	2015–	111	60
7	Mehdi Mahdavikia	1996–2009	110	13
8	Karim Ansarifard	2009–2024	104	30
9	Andranik Teymourian	2005–2016	101	9
9	**Alireza Jahanbakhsh**	2013–	101	17
11	**Sardar Azmoun**	2014–	95	58
12	**Alireza Beiranvand**	2015–	90	0
13	**Saeid Ezatolahi**	2015–	90	2
14	Karim Bagheri	1993–2010	87	50
14	Masoud Shojaei	2004–2019	87	8
16	Hossein Kaebi	2002–2010	84	1
17	Hamid Estili	1992–2000	82	12
18	Mohammad Nosrati	2002–2013	81	5
19	Javad Zarincheh	1987–2000	80	1
20	**Milad Mohammadi**	2015–	79	1
20	**Ramin Rezaeian**	2015–	79	10
22	Ali Parvin	1970–1980	76	13
22	Seyed Mehdi Rahmati	2004–2012	76	0
24	Yahya Golmohammadi	1993–2006	74	5
25	Ahmad Reza Abedzadeh	1987–1998	73	0
26	Alireza Vahedi Nikbakht	2000–2008	72	14
27	Vahid Amiri	2015–2023	71	2
27	Ibrahim Mirzapour	2001–2010	71	0
27	**Saman Ghoddos**	2017–	71	3
30	Hadi Aghily	2006–2012	69	10
31	Mehrdad Minavand	1996–2003	68	4
32	**Hossein Kanaanizadegan**	2015–	67	6
33	Parviz Qleechkhani	1964–1977	66	14
34	Afshin Peyrovani	1993–2002	65	0
35	Omid Ebrahimi	2012–2024	64	1
35	Nader Mohammadkhani	1988–1999	64	1
37	**Shojae Khalilzadeh**	2009–	63	2
38	Mohammad Reza Khalatbari	2005–2015	60	5
38	Eman Mobali	2001–2011	60	2
40	Khosrow Heydari	2007–2015	59	0
40	Ashkan Dejagah	2012–2019	59	11
42	**Morteza Pouraliganji**	2015–	54	3
42	Rahman Rezaei	2001–2009	54	3
44	Hamed Kavianpour	2000–2004	53	1
44	**Mehdi Torabi**	2015–	53	6
46	Pejman Montazeri	2008–2019	51	1
47	Mohammad Khakpour	1989–2000	50	2
47	Gholamreza Rezaei	2008–2013	50	11
47	Vahid Hashemian	1998–2009	50	15
50	Pejman Nouri	2003–2013	49	4
51	Mostafa Arab	1959–1972	48	2
51	Hassan Rowshan	1974–1980	48	13
53	Alireza Mansourian	1996–1998	47	7
54	Khodadad Azizi	1992–2004	45	11
54	Farhad Majidi	1996–2011	45	10
54	Mohammad Panjali	1978–1991	45	0
54	**Omid Noorafkan**	2018–	45	1
58	Majid Namjoo-Motlagh	1986–1997	44	4
58	Sirous Dinmohammadi	1993–2002	44	6
58	Reza Ghoochannejhad	2012–2018	44	17
58	Javad Kazemian	2001–2011	44	4
58	**Ali Gholizadeh**	2018–	44	7
63	Sirous Ghayeghran	1986–1993	43	6
64	Mehrzad Madanchi	2003–2010	42	8
64	**Mohammad Mohebi**	2019–	42	15
66	Mehdi Fonounizadeh	1986–1994	41	2
66	Hamid Derakhshan	1980–1993	41	9
66	Sattar Hamedani	1988–2001	41	1
69	Gholam Hossein Mazloumi	1969–1977	40	19
69	**Rouzbeh Cheshmi**	2017–	40	3
