= 2000 LG Cup (Iran) =

2000 LG Cup Four Nations Tournament
Tournament details
- Host country: Iran
- City: Tehran
- Dates: 7–9 June
- Teams: 4
- Venue: 1 (in 1 host city)

Final positions
- Champions: South Korea (1st title)
- Runners-up: Egypt
- Third place: Iran
- Fourth place: Macedonia

Tournament statistics
- Matches played: 4
- Goals scored: 10 (2.5 per match)
- Top scorer: (Iran) Ali Daei

The LG Cup Four Nations is an exhibition association football tournament that took place in Iran.

== Participating nations ==
| Country | Confederation | FIFA ranking (10 May 2000) |
|---|---|---|
| Egypt | CAF | 32 |
| Iran (hosts) | AFC | 42 |
| South Korea | AFC | 40 |
| North Macedonia | UEFA | 73 |

== Venues ==
| Tehran is located in Iran | Tehran |
|---|---|
| Tehran is located in Iran | Azadi Stadium |
| Tehran is located in Iran | Capacity: 100,000 |

== Results ==
=== Semifinals ===
7 June 2000

| South Korea | 2–1 | Macedonia |
|---|---|---|
| Choi Chul-woo 47'; Park Ji-sung 62' | Report | Sakiri 89' |

Azadi Stadium, Tehran

7 June 2000

| Iran | 1–1 | Egypt |
|---|---|---|
| Daei 58' | Report | Hassan 52' |
Penalties
| Daei (penalty scored); Karimi (penalty scored); Hamedani (penalty scored); Kavianpour (penalty scored); Bakhtiarizadeh (penalty scored); Yazdani (penalty missed); Rahbarifar (penalty scored); Minavand (penalty missed); Nekounam (penalty scored); Hasehemian (penalty missed) | 7–8 | (penalty scored) Kamouna; (penalty scored) Homos; (penalty scored) El-Saeed; (penalty scored) Sabry; (penalty scored) Hassan; (penalty missed) Khashaba; (penalty scored) Emam; (penalty missed) Hassan; (penalty scored) El-Sakk; (penalty scored) Farouk |

Azadi Stadium, Tehran

=== Third place match ===
9 June 2000

| Iran | 3–1 | Macedonia |
|---|---|---|
| Bagheri 3'; Daei 8'; Kavianpour 88' | Report | Hristov 5' |

Azadi Stadium, Tehran

=== Final ===
9 June 2000

| South Korea | 1–0 | Egypt |
|---|---|---|
| Park Kang-jo 63' |

Azadi Stadium, Tehran

2000 LG Cup (Iran) winner

South Korea
First title

== Scorers ==
2 goals

- (Iran) Ali Daei

1 goal

- (Egypt) Hossam Hassan
- (Iran) Karim Bagheri
- (Iran) Hamed Kavianpour
- (North Macedonia) Artim Šakiri
- (North Macedonia) Georgi Hristov
- (South Korea) Park Kang-jo
- (South Korea) Choi Chul-woo
- (South Korea) Park Ji-sung

== See also ==
- LG Cup
