= Austria national football B team =

National association football B team

Austria B
- Association: Österreichischer Fußball-Bund (ÖFB)
- Confederation: UEFA (Europe)
- FIFA code: AUT

First international
- Hungary 1–1 Austria (Szeged, Hungary; 10 April 1927)

Last international
- West Germany 3–0 Austria (Bayreuth, West Germany; 1 April 1980)

Biggest win
- Austria 4–1 Saar A (Vienna, Austria; 14 October 1951)

Biggest defeat
- Italy 8–1 Austria (Genoa, Italy; 11 November 1934)

The Austria national football B team was a secondary men's national football team which represented the Austria. It was used to try out and develop players for potential inclusion in the first team. Its matches are not considered full internationals.

== History ==
The B team played its first match on 10 April 1927 against Hungary, a 1–1 draw. They played their final match on 1 April 1980 against West Germany, which finished as a 0–3 loss. The team was subsequently replaced by the Austria under-21 national team.

== Matches ==
The Austria B team are known to have played the following matches.

| Date | Home team | Score | Away team | City |
|---|---|---|---|---|
| 10 April 1927 | Hungary | 1–1 | Austria | Szeged |
| 11 February 1934 | Italy | 2–0 | Austria | Trieste |
| 11 November 1934 | Italy | 8–1 | Austria | Genoa |
| 24 March 1935 | Italy | 0–0 | Austria | Livorno |
| 21 March 1937 | Italy | 3–2 | Austria | Vigevano |
| 18 April 1948 | Switzerland | 1–3 | Austria | Lucerne |
| 31 October 1948 | Austria | 0–1 | Czechoslovakia | Vienna |
| 3 April 1949 | Austria | 0–1 | Switzerland | Vienna |
| 27 May 1951 | Saar A | 3–2 | Austria | Saarbrücken |
| 14 October 1951 | Austria | 1–4 | Saar A | Vienna |
| 4 September 1960 | Soviet Union | 1–2 | Austria | Moscow |
| 28 September 1960 | Austria | 2–2 | Hungary | Vienna |
| 10 June 1961 | Austria | 1–2 | Hungary | Vienna |
| 9 September 1961 | Austria | 2–1 | Soviet Union | Vienna |
| 7 October 1961 | Hungary | 2–1 | Austria | Debrecen |
| 18 November 1961 | Austria | 4–4 | Yugoslavia | Linz |
| 23 June 1962 | Hungary | 3–1 | Austria | Szombathely |
| 15 September 1962 | Czechoslovakia | 3–1 | Austria | Trenčín |
| 27 October 1962 | Austria | 1–4 | Hungary | Vienna |
| 8 May 1963 | Austria | 2–0 | Italy | Vienna |
| 5 June 1963 | Italy | 2–0 | Austria | Udine |
| 11 April 1964 | Austria | 1–3 | Czechoslovakia | Vienna |
| 2 May 1964 | Hungary | 5–0 | Austria | Budapest |
| 11 October 1964 | Soviet Union | 0–0 | Austria | Moscow |
| 24 March 1965 | Austria | 0–2 | France | Salzburg |
| 24 April 1965 | Czechoslovakia | 1–0 | Austria | Plzeň |
| 15 May 1965 | Austria | 1–1 | Soviet Union | Innsbruck |
| 12 June 1965 | Hungary | 3–0 | Austria | Szombathely |
| 4 September 1965 | Austria | 0–2 | Hungary | Salzburg |
| 2 September 1975 | West Germany | 2–0 | Austria | Augsburg |
| 12 June 1976 | Austria | 1–1 | Hungary | Bruck an der Leitha |
| 21 September 1976 | Switzerland | 4–1 | Austria | St. Gallen |
| 14 November 1978 | Austria | 1–0 | Portugal | Linz |
| 28 March 1979 | Belgium | 5–0 | Austria | Brussels |
| 1 May 1979 | Austria | 0–0 | Belgium | Braunau am Inn |
| 12 June 1979 | Austria | 0–1 | England | Klagenfurt |
| 28 August 1979 | Austria | 2–0 | Norway | Mattersburg |
| 20 November 1979 | Portugal | 1–2 | Austria | Évora |
| 1 April 1980 | West Germany | 3–0 | Austria | Bayreuth |
