= Keith Walker (referee) =

English association football referee

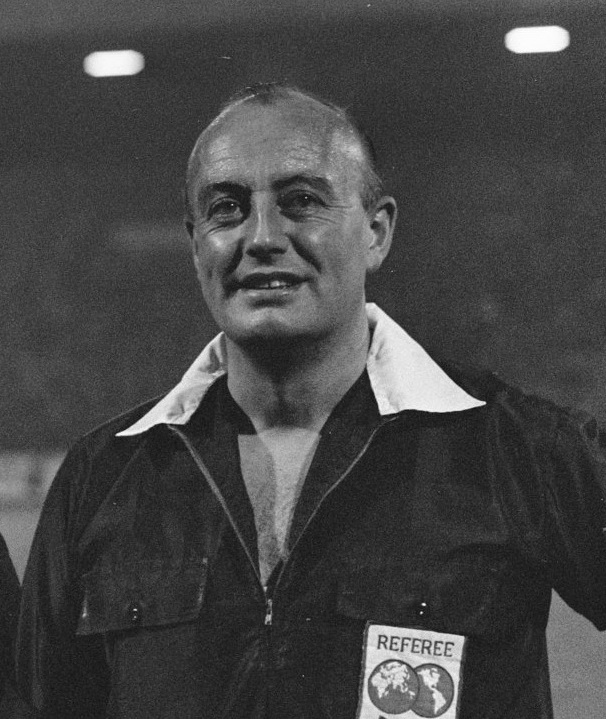
- Walker before the match Belgium vs Netherlands 19 November 1972
- Full name: Keith Edwin Walker
- Born: 21 December 1930; Manchester, England
- Died: 15 May 1996 (aged 65)
- Other occupation: Civil defence instructor, educational officer, football administrator

Domestic
Years	League	Role
1961–1972	English Football League	Referee

International
Years	League	Role
1970–1972	FIFA	Referee

Keith Edwin Walker (21 December 1930 – 15 May 1996) was an English association football referee. Known for his strictness he was considered one of the Football League First Division's top referees.

He was born in Manchester but moved to Blackpool where he started his refereeing career after playing as a goalkeeper for Lytham in the Lancashire Combination. After officiating in the Lancashire Combination, Irish League and Central League he became a Football League linesman in 1959 and was promoted to the Referees List two years later aged only 30. He had a season based in Preston (1965-1966) before in 1967 moving from Blackpool, where he worked as civil defence instructor, to the village of Bearsted near Maidstone, Kent, where he worked for Kent County Council as estates administrative officer, becoming promoted to Senior Educational Administrative Officer. He officiated the Northern Irish Cup Final 1968 in which Crusaders F.C. from Belfast defeated their city rivals Linfield F.C. 2–0.

In the First Division he gained some notoriety, after he sent off the Wolverhampton Wanderers player Derek Dougan for remarks he made towards a linesman in the match against Everton FC in early October 1969 causing unrest on the stands occasioning injury to 84 people. Dougan was later banned for eight weeks, which was a post-war record.

From 1970 to 1972 he was also on the FIFA list. His first match as head-referee on international level was in 1970 a match of the Inter-Cities Fairs Cup. In 1972 he also officiated a match of the European Champions' Cup. On national team level he officiated in October and November 1972 two qualification matches for the World Cup 1974 in which Yugoslavia drew with Spain and Belgium drew with Netherlands. Earlier that year he also was referee in three matches of the Brazilian Independence Cup, up to then the biggest tournament of national teams ever. His highlight there was the match between Argentina and Uruguay. He also served there as linesman under head referee Abraham Klein in the final, in which Brazil prevailed 1–0 over Portugal.

In late October 1972 he announced his retirement from refereeing to take up the post of secretary with Sheffield United F.C., which was remunerated with £6.000 annually, in January 1973. He stayed there until the end of 1978. In January 1979 he joined with an initial three year in January 1973 the North American Soccer League as head of officials. There he replaced Eddie Pearson, another former English referee, who had served in this position since 1973, who died from a car accident. After the collapse of the NASL he took on the job of secretary of the newly founded United States Soccer Federation. After his return to England he held positions with Rotherham United and Mansfield Town.

== Sources ==
- Football League Handbooks, 1959–1972
- Football League Review 1967, volume 2, number 9
