= 2002 LG Cup (Iran) =

2002 LG Cup Four Nations Tournament
Tournament details
- Host country: Iran
- City: Tabriz
- Dates: 17–19 September
- Teams: 4
- Venue: 1 (in 1 host city)

Final positions
- Champions: Iran (3rd title)
- Runners-up: Paraguay
- Third place: Morocco
- Fourth place: South Africa

Tournament statistics
- Matches played: 4
- Goals scored: 6 (1.5 per match)

The LG Cup Four Nations is an exhibition association football tournament that took place in Iran.

== Participating nations ==
Country	Confederation	FIFA ranking (14 August 2002)
Iran (hosts)	AFC	34
Morocco XI	CAF	41
Paraguay	CONMEBOL	16
South Africa	CAF	32

== Venues ==
Tabriz is located in Iran	Tabriz
Tabriz is located in Iran	Takhti Stadium
Tabriz is located in Iran	Capacity: 25,000

== Results ==
=== Semifinals ===
17 September 2002
Semi-Final

Iran	1–1	Morocco XI
Penalties
	4–3

Takhti Stadium, Tabriz

17 September 2002
Semi-Final

Paraguay	2–0	South Africa

Takhti Stadium, Tabriz

=== Third place match ===
19 September 2002
Third place match

Morocco XI	0–0	South Africa
Penalties
	3–0

Takhti Stadium, Tabriz

=== Final ===
19 September 2002
19:30

Iran	1–1	Paraguay
Daei 41'	Report; Report	Bareiro 35'
Penalties
	4–3

Takhti Stadium, Tabriz
Attendance: 25,000
Referee: Saad Kamil (Kuwait)

2002 LG Cup (Iran) winner

Iran
Third title
