= 2003 LG Cup (Nigeria) =

2003 LG Cup Four Nations Tournament
Tournament details
- Host country: Nigeria
- City: Abuja, Lagos
- Dates: 30 May – 1 June
- Teams: 4
- Venue: 2 (in 2 host cities)

Final positions
- Champions: Nigeria (1st title)
- Runners-up: Cameroon
- Third place: Iran
- Fourth place: Ghana

Tournament statistics
- Matches played: 3
- Goals scored: 10 (3.33 per match)
- Top scorer: (Nigeria) Yakubu Aiyegbeni

The LG Cup Four Nations is an exhibition association football tournament that took place in Nigeria.

== Participants ==
The participants were:

- Cameroon B
- Nigeria
- Iran
- Ghana

== Results ==
=== Semifinals ===
30 May 2003

Nigeria	3–1	Ghana
Aiyegbeni 49' (pen.), 71'; Enakhire 82'		Agyema 3'

Abuja

30 May 2003

Cameroon B	2–1	Iran
Suffo 37', 68'	Report	17' (o.g.)

Abuja

=== Third place match ===
1 June 2003

Iran	v	Ghana

Iran waited for 35 minutes on the pitch, while Ghana did not show up at all, apparently demanding prize money for the fourth place finishers (uncommon in LG tournaments). Eventually Iran left, without obtaining any information from the Nigerian 'organisers'. "One day later, the Nigerian FA awarded Ghana third place (and the relevant prize money) because Iran had left the pitch" (sic!). Iran has understandably protested.

=== Final ===
1 June 2003

Nigeria	3–0	Cameroon B
Yobo 98'; Aiyegbeni 100'; Garba 102'

Lagos

== Bracket ==
Semi-finals
30 May 2003 – Abuja
Nigeria	3
Ghana	1
30 May 2003 – Abuja
Iran	1
Cameroon	2

Final
1 June 2003 - Lagos
Nigeria	3
Cameroon	0
Third place
1 June 2003
Ghana	–
Iran	–

2003 LG Cup (Nigeria) winner

Nigeria
First title

== Scorers ==
3 goal

- (Nigeria) Yakubu Aiyegbeni

2 goal

- (Cameroon) B Patrick Suffo

1 goal

- (Ghana) Patrick Agyemang
- (Nigeria) Joseph Enakarhire
- (Nigeria) Joseph Yobo
- (Nigeria) Ahmed Garba

== See also ==
- LG Cup
