= 2002 LG Cup (Morocco) =

2002 LG Cup Four Nations Tournament
Tournament details
- Host country: Morocco
- City: Casablanca
- Dates: 1–3 March
- Teams: 4
- Venue: 1 (in 1 host city)

Final positions
- Champions: Iran (2nd title)
- Runners-up: Algeria
- Third place: Morocco
- Fourth place: Venezuela

Tournament statistics
- Matches played: 4
- Goals scored: 3 (0.75 per match)
- Top scorer(s): (Iran) Mojahed Khaziravi (Morocco) Mohamed Madihi (Morocco) Bouabid Bouden (1 goal)

The LG Cup is an exhibition association football tournament that took place in Morocco.

== Participants ==
The participants were:

- Iran
- Algeria B
- Morocco Olympic
- Venezuela

== Results ==
=== Semifinals ===
1 March 2002

Iran	1–0	Venezuela
Khaziravi 12'	Report; Report

Stade Mohammed V, Casablanca
Attendance: 500
Referee: Khalil Rouissi (Morocco)

1 March 2002

Morocco Olympic	0–0	Algeria B
Penalties
	4–5

Stade Mohammed V, Casablanca

=== Third place match ===
3 March 2002

Morocco Olympic	2–0	Venezuela
Madihi 42'; Bouabid 54'

Stade Mohammed V, Casablanca

=== Final ===
3 March 2002

Iran	0–0	Algeria B
Penalties
	9–8

Stade Mohammed V, Casablanca

2002 LG Cup (Morocco) winner

Iran
Second title

== Scorers ==
1 goal

- (Iran) Mojahed Khaziravi
- (Morocco) Olympic Mohamed Madihi
- (Morocco) Olympic Bouabid Bouden

== See also ==
- LG Cup
