= Simon Elliott =

New Zealand footballer (born 1974)

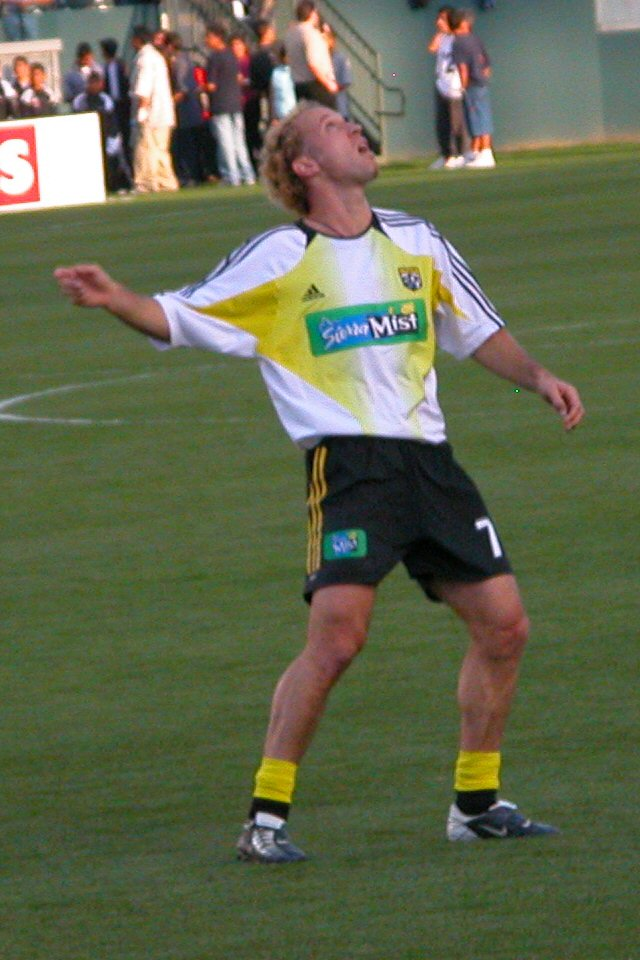
- Elliott playing for Columbus Crew

Personal information
- Full name: Simon John Elliott
- Date of birth: 10 June 1974 (age 52)
- Place of birth: Wellington, New Zealand
- Height: 5 ft 11 in (1.80 m)
- Position: Defensive midfielder

Youth career
- 1980–1989: Waterside Karori
- 1989–1992: Wellington College

College career
Years	Team	Apps	(Gls)
1997–1998	Stanford Cardinal		

Senior career*
Years	Team	Apps	(Gls)
1992	Wellington United		
1993–1995	Wellington Olympic	27	(14)
1996–1997	Miramar Rangers	36	(13)
1997	Western Suburbs FC		
1999	Boston Bulldogs	3	(0)
1999–2003	Los Angeles Galaxy	122	(10)
2004–2005	Columbus Crew	59	(1)
2006–2008	Fulham	12	(0)
2009	San Jose Earthquakes	15	(0)
2010	Wellington Phoenix	4	(0)
2011	Chivas USA	24	(0)
Total		302+	(38+)

International career
- New Zealand U20
2008	New Zealand Olympic (O.P.)	3	(0)
1995–2011	New Zealand	69	(6)

Managerial career
- 2018–2019: Sacramento Republic
Medal record
Representing New Zealand
Men's Association football
OFC Nations Cup
Winner	2002 New Zealand
Runner-up	2000 Tahiti
Third place	2004 Australia
AFC–OFC Challenge Cup
Runner-up	2003 Iran
- * Club domestic league appearances and goals

Simon John Elliott (born 10 June 1974) is a New Zealand football manager and former player who most recently served as head coach of USL Championship side Sacramento Republic FC. A defensive midfielder, he spent his professional career in the A-League, MLS and the Premier League. At international level, he made 69 appearances for the New Zealand national team, scoring 6 goals.

== Semi-professional and college career ==
Elliott was born in Wellington. He played for several clubs in the New Zealand semi-professional Central Premier League in the 1990s, and attended Wellington College prior to moving to the United States. Elliott subsequently played college soccer at Stanford University, where he scored 13 goals and made 12 assists.

== Club career ==
Elliott began his professional career with A-League (now USL First Division) team Boston Bulldogs in 1999, playing three games, before joining Major League Soccer club Los Angeles Galaxy in May 1999. He was voted Most Valuable Player (MVP) in 2000 after scoring five goals and making five assists, and helped the club to win the CONCACAF Champions' Cup in 2000, the U.S. Open Cup in 2001 and the MLS Cup in 2002. He made 122 appearances for Galaxy in five seasons, scoring ten goals. In 2001, Elliott trained for two months with Manchester United in England, but eventually returned to the United States.

Elliott was traded in January 2004 to the Columbus Crew in exchange for a first round pick in the 2005 MLS SuperDraft. He played every game in the 2005 season but was unable to help the Crew to the MLS Cup Playoffs as they finished bottom of the Eastern Conference.

Elliott caught the eye of Chris Coleman, manager of Premier League club Fulham, during a pre-season friendly game in July 2005 and joined Fulham in training after the end of the MLS season. He then joined Fulham in January 2006 on a free transfer and made 13 league and cup appearances during the remainder of the 2005–06 season. During the summer he injured a calf muscle, and missed the entire Premier League 2006–07 season through injury; he played in some reserve games towards the end of the season. He was released by Fulham in May 2008. After his release from Fulham, Elliott joined Motherwell on trial in January 2009.

Elliott returned to Major League Soccer in 2009, signing with the San Jose Earthquakes. He was waived from San Jose prior to the 2010 season opener.

In November 2010, Elliott signed for hometown professional A-League club Wellington Phoenix as an Injury Replacement Player for Oscar Roberto Cornejo.

In February 2011, Elliott went on trial with Chivas USA in the MLS and signed with the club on 9 February 2011. At season's end, his contract expired and he entered the 2011 MLS Re-Entry Draft. Elliott was not selected in the draft and became a free agent.

He served as head scout during the 2012 season but was not retained for a second year.

In February 2018, Elliott was hired as head coach for the Sacramento Republic FC. After finishing 7th place in the USL Championship season and getting knocked out in the conference semifinals of the USL Championship Playoffs, Sacramento Republic decided not to extend Elliott contract.

== International career ==
Elliott scored on his full New Zealand national team debut in a 3–0 win over Singapore on 21 February 1995 and earned his 50th A-international cap in a 3–0 win over New Caledonia on 10 September 2008, accruing 6 goals en route to his milestone. He appeared in qualifying matches for the 2002 FIFA World Cup and in the 2003 FIFA Confederations Cup in France. Elliott was included in the New Zealand U-23 squad for their first appearance at the Olympic Games as one of three over age players, alongside Ryan Nelsen and Chris Killen He was named as part of the 2009 FIFA Confederations Cup New Zealand squad to travel to South Africa.

On 10 May 2010, Elliott was named in New Zealand's final 23-man squad to compete at the 2010 FIFA World Cup, despite not being under contract at any club.

== Career statistics ==
=== Club ===
Appearances and goals by club, season and competition
Club	Season	League			MLS Cup		National cup (Note: Includes Open Cup, FA Cup.)		League cup (Note: Includes League Cup.)		Continental		Total	
Club	Season	Division	Apps	Goals	Apps	Goals	Apps	Goals	Apps	Goals	Apps	Goals	Apps	Goals
Los Angeles Galaxy	1999	Major League Soccer	23	2	5	0	2	0	–		–		30	2
Los Angeles Galaxy	2000	Major League Soccer	28	5	5	0	0	0	–		–		33	5
Los Angeles Galaxy	2001	Major League Soccer	21	1	7	0	1	0	–		3	0	32	1
Los Angeles Galaxy	2002	Major League Soccer	26	1	6	0	1	0	–		–		32	1
Los Angeles Galaxy	2003	Major League Soccer	24	1	2	0	0	0	–		1	0	26	1
Los Angeles Galaxy	Total		122	10	25	0			0	0			147	10
Columbus Crew	2004	Major League Soccer	27	0	2	0	0	0	–		–		29	0
Columbus Crew	2005	Major League Soccer	32	1	–		0	0	–		–		32	1
Columbus Crew	Total		59	1	2	0			0	0			61	1
Fulham	2005–06	Premier League	12	0	–		1	0	0	0	–		13	0
Fulham	2006–07	Premier League	0	0	–		0	0	0	0	–		0	0
Fulham	Total		12	0	0	0	1	0	0	0	0	0	13	0
San Jose Earthquakes	2009	Major League Soccer	15	0	–		0	0	–		–		15	0
Wellington Phoenix	2010–11	A-League	4	0	–		–		–		–		4	0
Chivas USA	2011	Major League Soccer	24	0	–		0	0	–		–		24	0
Career total			236	11	27	0	1	0					264	11

=== International ===
Appearances and goals by national team and year
National team	Year	Apps	Goals
New Zealand	1995	9	1
New Zealand	1996	6	1
New Zealand	1997	9	1
New Zealand	1998	0	0
New Zealand	1999	0	0
New Zealand	2000	6	3
New Zealand	2001	7	0
New Zealand	2002	2	0
New Zealand	2003	6	0
New Zealand	2004	3	0
New Zealand	2005	0	0
New Zealand	2006	0	0
New Zealand	2007	0	0
New Zealand	2008	2	0
New Zealand	2009	9	0
New Zealand	2010	9	0
New Zealand	2011	1	0
Total		69	6

Scores and results list New Zealand's goal tally first, score column indicates score after each Elliott goal.

List of international goals scored by Simon Elliott
No.	Date	Venue	Opponent	Score	Result	Competition	Ref.
1	21 February 1995	Tauranga, New Zealand	Singapore	2–0	3–0	Friendly	
2	1 October 1996	Muscat, Oman	Oman	–	2–1	Friendly	
3	11 June 1997	North Harbour Stadium, North Shore, New Zealand	Papua New Guinea	5–0	7–0	1998 FIFA World Cup qualification	
4	16 January 2000	Tianhe Stadium, Guangzhou, China	Jamaica	1–0	1–2	Friendly	
5	25 June 2000	Stade Pater, Papeete, Tahiti	Solomon Islands	1–0	2–0	2000 OFC Nations Cup	
6	25 June 2000	Stade Pater, Papeete, Tahiti	Solomon Islands	2–0	2–0	2000 OFC Nations Cup	

== Honours ==
LA Galaxy

- CONCACAF Champions League: 2000
- MLS Cup: 2002
- MLS Supporters' Shield: 2002
- U.S. Open Cup: 2001

New Zealand

- OFC Nations Cup: 2002; Runner-up, 2000; 3rd place, 2004
- AFC–OFC Challenge Cup: Runner-up, 2003

Sporting positions
Preceded by Jonathan Bornstein & Sacha Kljestan	Chivas USA captain 2011	Succeeded by Alejandro Moreno
