= Mehdi Mahdavikia =

Iranian football coach and former player

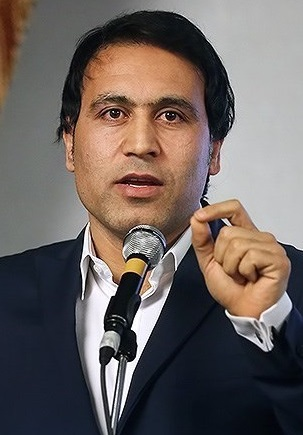

Personal information
- Full name: Mehdi Mahdavikia
- Date of birth: 24 July 1977 (age 49)
- Place of birth: Ray, Imperial State of Iran
- Height: 1.72 m (5 ft 8 in)
- Positions: Right winger; right back

Youth career
- 1991–1995: Bank Melli

Senior career*
Years	Team	Apps	(Gls)
1995–1999	Persepolis	54	(18)
1998–1999	→ VfL Bochum (loan)	12	(3)
1999–2007	Hamburger SV	211	(26)
2002	→ Hamburger SV Amateure (loan)	2	(0)
2007–2010	Eintracht Frankfurt	32	(0)
2010–2011	Steel Azin	34	(4)
2011–2012	Damash Gilan	14	(0)
2012–2013	Persepolis	27	(3)
Total		386	(54)

International career
1994	Iran U20	2	(0)
1994–1999	Iran U23	12	(2)
1997	Iran CISM	3	(1)
1996–2009	Iran	110	(13)

Managerial career
- 2013: Iran U17 (technical manager)
- 2013–2015: Iran U19 (technical manager)
- 2015–2018: Hamburger SV Academy (offensive coach)
- 2018: Hamburger SV U16 (assistant)
- 2018–2019: Hamburger SV II (assistant)
- 2021–2022: Iran U23
- 2024–: Al Jazirah Al Hamra
- * Club domestic league appearances and goals

Mehdi Mahdavikia (Persian: مهدی مهدوی‌کیا; born 24 July 1977) is an Iranian professional football coach and former player usually played as a right winger or right back.

He was at Hamburger SV as a youth coach, and also managed his own youth academy, FC KIA. He is currently head coach of Al Jazeera Al Hamra F.C. in UAE League 2.

Mahdavikia currently represents Asian Football Confederation (AFC) in the Football Advisory Panel of International Football Association Board (IFAB), joining the body in 2019. On 15 May 2013, Mahdavikia was appointed as AFC Grassroots Ambassador.

During his playing career, Mahdavikia internationally represented Iranian national team, which he captained from 2006 to 2009, and currently is the fourth most capped player of all-time. He played for Iranian clubs Bank Melli, Persepolis, Steel Azin and Damash Gilan, as well as German clubs VfL Bochum, Hamburger SV and Eintracht Frankfurt, spending 12 consecutive seasons in Bundesliga.

He won the Asian Young Footballer of the Year award in 1997 as well as the Asian Footballer of the Year award in 2003. He was known for his crossing, speed and dribbling.

== Club career ==
=== Early career ===
Mahdavikia first played for Persepolis in his native Iran before moving to VfL Bochum in Germany. After Bochum's relegation, he signed for Bundesliga side Hamburg where he stayed for the next eight seasons.

=== Hamburger SV ===
Hamburger Morgenpost estimated market value of Mahdavikia in 1999 as DM6.5 million.

His initial position for HSV was right fullback, from which he was known for his attacking runs, as he has previous experience as a right winger and at times has played as a striker. He also played some matches for Pas in Asian games as help for the club. Under coach Frank Pagelsdorf Mahdavikia used to play wide striker. For the 2006–07 Bundesliga season he moved back to his natural position of right wing, in support of Central Midfielder Rafael van der Vaart. He was awarded Hamburg Player of the Year in 2003 and 2004 by the fans, and also attained the title of the top assister of goals in the Bundesliga.

In 2003, Die Welt wrote that Mahdavikia is worth €8–10 million.

However, compared to his previous season, he had a poor season in 2004–05 and was benched. In the 2005–06 season he gained his old form back and was able to regain his spot as a starter, being influential in many of Hamburg's victories, such as scoring the winning goal against then Bundesliga heavyweights Schalke.

Mahdavikia's strongest points were his vision, passing skills, fast-paced runs (his nickname in Iran is "The Rocket"), and set-pieces such as corners, spotkicks and free kicks. He usually was the right-footed alternative to Van der Vaart's well known left foot. He is also well received off the pitch as he has been known to find time for fans and reporters to answer questions or sign autographs.

His nickname in Hamburg is The Carpet (der Teppich) for his ability to "magically glide past" his opponents like the enchanted carpet.

=== Eintracht Frankfurt ===
On 8 June 2007, Mahdavikia signed a three-year contract with Eintracht Frankfurt.

In his first season, he had two bad injuries that forced him to miss many matches. In the second season he was mostly benched and not used in many matches which showed that the club did not want him anymore. After 255 Games (26 goals, 55 assists) in the Bundesliga for HSV, Bochum and Eintracht Frankfurt, left Germany to sign for Steel Azin in January 2010.

=== Return to Iran ===
On 4 July 2011, Mahdavikia signed a contract with Amir Abedini, President of the Damash Gilan to join to the club for one year but he was joined to his beloved club, Persepolis in mid-season to play for club in his last year of playing football. He extended his contract with Persepolis for another season on 19 June 2012.

=== Retirement ===
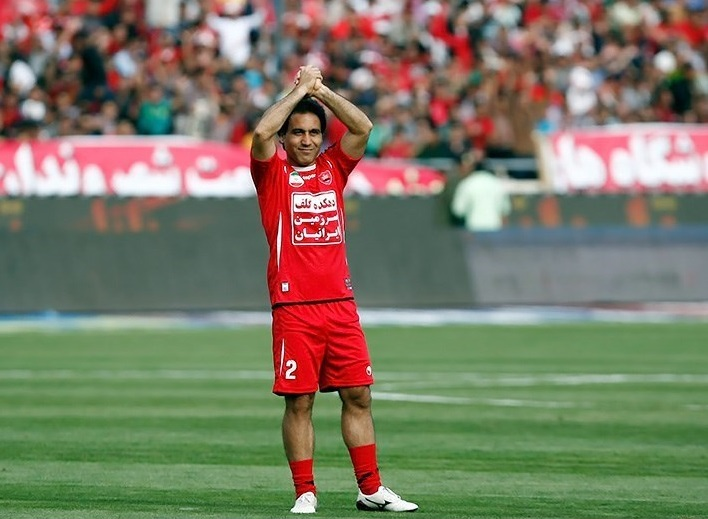
Mahdavikia in his last match for Persepolis

On 2 March 2013, Mahdavikia announced that he would retire at the end of the 2012–13 season. Persepolis also announced that Mahdavikia's farewell match would be in a pre-season friendly match against A.C. Milan in June 2013, played in the Azadi Stadium, but it was later announced that Mahdavikia's last match would be against his former side, Hamburger SV in June 2013 in the same stadium.

Mahdavikia confirmed on 14 March 2013 that he ended his active football career. He played his last match as a football player in the 2013 Hazfi Cup Final, coming on extra time as a substitute. On 28 November 2013, he played a farewell match at Azadi Stadium between Persepolis XI and A.C. Milan XI. Participants in the match included former teams' legends like Hamid Derakhshan, Mohammad Panjali, Farshad Pious, Karim Bagheri, Hamid Estili, Nasser Mohammadkhani, Pejman Jamshidi, Edmond Bezik which played for Persepolis and Franco Baresi, Paolo Maldini, Daniele Massaro, Gennaro Gattuso and Alberigo Evani for A.C. Milan. Persepolis were managed by the club's most successful manager Ali Parvin. When Mahdavikia came on as a substitute in the 32nd minute, Pious gave his shirt to Mahdavikia, in a remarkable replay after seventeen years that Pious did so in Mahdavikia's first match for Persepolis. The match was won by A.C. Milan XI 3–1 with Mahdavikia assisting the only goal.

== International career ==
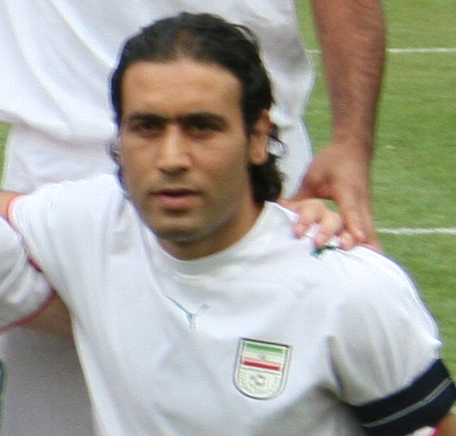
Mahdavikia in 2006

Having been awarded the Asian Young Footballer of the Year award in 1997, Mahdavikia was considered Iran's best player in the 1998 FIFA World Cup and was named in the list from which the team of the tournament was chosen. In 2003, he was awarded Asian Player of the Year by the Asian Football Confederation. He was also the top assister in the 2004 Asian Cup, exhibiting stunning form to steer Iran's attack to superb attacking football. He played in four Asian Cups (1996, 2000, 2004, 2007) and two World Cups (1998, 2006).

Mahdavikia was one of the influential players that played in Iran's crucial 1–0 victory over Bahrain to qualify for the 2006 FIFA World Cup held in Germany. Following the FIFA World Cup in Germany, 2006, Mahdavikia was expected to assume the role of Captain in the Iranian national side, replacing Ali Daei and Yahya Golmohammadi who had publicly announced their intention to retire after the tournament. Mahdavikia was given the captain's band on 16 August 2006 in an Asian Cup qualifier versus Syria.

Mahdavikia has reportedly been forced to "retire" from international football after wearing a green bracelet in the final World Cup 2010 qualification match against the Republic of Korea. The green bracelet was a sign of support for those protesting the highly contested Iranian presidential election. He was forced to retire from Team Melli after 13 years and playing in two World Cups (1998, 2006), four Asian Cups (1996, 2000, 2004, 2007), one Asian Games tournament (1998), four World Cup qualifying campaigns (1998, 2002, 2006, 2010), three Asian Cup qualifying campaigns (2000, 2004, 2007) and one AFC/OFC Cup.

== Managerial career ==
Mahdavikia was the manager of the Iranian youth teams. In 2015, he founded the KIA Football Academy with Ali Doustimehr. He currently has a role as a youth coach with Hamburger SV.

In May 2019, Mahdavikia obtained UEFA A Licence and plans to enter DFB's Fußballlehrer course.

== Famous matches ==
Mahdavikia's most prolific club match was Hamburger SV's match against Juventus in the 2000–01 UEFA Champions League. He was the impetus that rallied Hamburg back after being down 3–1 by scoring once, assisting one and winning a penalty for Hamburg that saw Hamburg take a 4–3 lead; Juve managed to equalise with an Inzaghi penalty.

Another game in the HSV shirt came in week 30 of the 2002–03 season. Mahdavikia scored one and assisted another two goals in Hamburg's 4–0 win over 1. FC Nuremberg. Kicker gave him a rare perfect note of 1.0.

Mehdi's greatest national team match, arguably, was against South Korea in the 2004 Asia Cup where he assisted three goals in Iran's 4–3 win. Many also point to his game against the United States in World Cup 1998 that saw him score Iran's second and winning goal, as his best ever. Another excellent match where he scored two great goals was against China in the qualification round for the 1998 World Cup when he was just 20 years old.

== Personal life ==
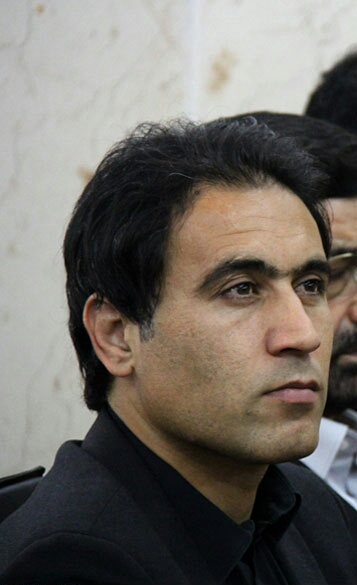
Mahdavikia in 2012

Mahdavikia played several sports as a youngster and was exceptionally talented at handball, even being named captain of Iran's under 14 team.

Mahdavikia is married to Sepideh and has a daughter, Asal.

In April 2006, Mahdavikia caused a stir when it came out he married a second wife named, Samira Samii, while being in his native Iran in December 2005, thus practising bigamy. He himself stated that he made a "big mistake", and they divorced after a short while.

Mahdavikia's younger brother, Hadi played for Homa F.C. and Persepolis F.C., and now is the head coach of KIA Football Academy. Mahdavikia's nephew Mostafa is also a football player in Iran.

During the 2025–2026 Iranian protests, Mahdavikia called on the international community to prevent the voices of protesters from being silenced as a result of the Iranian government's internet blackouts in response to the protests, stating: "When the internet is shut down, human rights are also silenced." On 24 January 2026, Mahdavikia reposted a picture of a stunned woman over the bodies of victims killed in the protests in Kahrizak, stating: "The image is telling. Anyone whose heart does not ache has not smelled of honor and humanity."

== Career statistics ==
=== Club ===
Appearances and goals by club, season and competition
Club	Season	League			National Cup		League Cup		Continental		Total	
Club	Season	Division	Apps	Goals	Apps	Goals	Apps	Goals	Apps	Goals	Apps	Goals
Bank Melli	1994–95	Division 2									18	10
Persepolis	1995–96	Azadegan League	11	1	–		–		–		11	1
Persepolis	1996–97	Azadegan League	28	9	2	2	–		7	1	37	12
Persepolis	1997–98	Azadegan League	6	6	–		–		4	3	10	9
Persepolis	1998–99	Azadegan League	9	2	0	0	–		–		9	2
Persepolis	Total		54	18	2	2	–		11	4	67	24
Pas (loan)	1998–99	–	–		–		–		2	0	2	0
Bochum (loan)	1998–99	Bundesliga	12	3	0	0	–		–		12	3
Hamburger SV	1999–00	Bundesliga	29	4	1	0	–		6	2	36	6
Hamburger SV	2000–01	Bundesliga	29	5	1	1	1	0	9	3	40	9
Hamburger SV	2001–02	Bundesliga	11	1	0	0	–		–		11	1
Hamburger SV	2002–03	Bundesliga	26	2	2	0	–		–		28	2
Hamburger SV	2003–04	Bundesliga	32	5	2	1	3	0	2	0	39	6
Hamburger SV	2004–05	Bundesliga	26	2	1	0	–		0	0	27	2
Hamburger SV	2005–06	Bundesliga	31	5	3	1	–		10	0	44	6
Hamburger SV	2006–07	Bundesliga	27	2	1	0	2	0	8	0	38	2
Hamburger SV	Total		211	26	11	3	6	0	35	5	263	34
Hamburger SV Amateure	2002–03	Regionalliga Nord	2	0	0	0	–		–		2	0
Eintracht Frankfurt	2007–08	Bundesliga	20	0	1	0	–		–		21	0
Eintracht Frankfurt	2008–09	Bundesliga	12	0	2	0	–		–		14	0
Eintracht Frankfurt	2009–10	Bundesliga	0	0	0	0	–		–		0	0
Eintracht Frankfurt	Total		32	0	3	0	0	0	0	0	35	0
Steel Azin	2009–10	Iran Pro League	8	2	3	2	–		–		11	4
Steel Azin	2010–11	Iran Pro League	26	2	0	0	–		–		26	2
Steel Azin	Total		34	4	3	2	–		0	0	37	6
Damash	2011–12	Iran Pro League	14	0	2	0	–		–		16	0
Persepolis	2011–12	Iran Pro League	11	0	0	0	–		3	0	14	0
Persepolis	2012–13	Iran Pro League	16	3	2	0	–		–		18	3
Persepolis	Total		27	3	2	0	–		3	0	32	3
Career total			386	54	23	7	6	0	51	9	484	80

=== International ===
Appearances and goals by national team and year
National team	Year	Apps	Goals
Iran	1996	3	0
Iran	1997	21	5
Iran	1998	17	2
Iran	1999	2	0
Iran	2000	14	2
Iran	2001	11	1
Iran	2003	3	0
Iran	2004	10	1
Iran	2005	7	1
Iran	2006	7	0
Iran	2007	6^{1}	0
Iran	2008	3	1
Iran	2009	6	0
Total		110	13

- 1.Excluding a friendly match against Ghana U-23 that is not considered a full international.

Scores and results list Iran's goal tally first, score column indicates score after each Mahdavikia goal.

List of international goals scored by Mehdi Mahdavikia
No.	Date	Venue	Opponent	Score	Result	Competition
1	21 April 1997	Takhti Stadium, Tabriz, Iran	Kenya	2–0	3–0	Friendly
2	2 June 1997	Abbasiyyin Stadium, Damascus, Syria	Maldives	11–0	17–0	1998 FIFA World Cup qualification
3	11 June 1997	Azadi Stadium, Tehran, Iran	Maldives	4–0	9–0	1998 FIFA World Cup qualification
4	13 September 1997	Jinzhou Stadium, Dalian, China	China	2–2	4–2	1998 FIFA World Cup qualification
5	13 September 1997	Jinzhou Stadium, Dalian, China	China	3–2	4–2	1998 FIFA World Cup qualification
6	31 January 1998	Hong Kong Stadium, Causeway Bay, Hong Kong	Chile	1–1	1–1	Friendly
7	21 June 1998	Stade de Gerland, Lyon, France	United States	2–0	2–1	1998 FIFA World Cup
8	16 January 2000	Rose Bowl, Pasadena, United States	United States	1–0	1–1	Friendly
9	31 March 2000	Al-Hamadaniah Stadium, Aleppo, Syria	Maldives	3–0	8–0	2000 AFC Asian Cup qualification
10	12 October 2001	Azadi Stadium, Tehran, Iran	Iraq	1–0	2–1	2002 FIFA World Cup qualification
11	18 February 2004	Azadi Stadium, Tehran, Iran	Qatar	2–0	3–1	2006 FIFA World Cup qualification
12	30 March 2005	Kim Il Sung Stadium, Pyongyang, North Korea	North Korea	1–0	2–0	2006 FIFA World Cup qualification
13	15 October 2008	Azadi Stadium, Tehran, Iran	North Korea	1–0	2–1	2010 FIFA World Cup qualification

== Honours ==
Persepolis

- Azadegan League: 1995–96, 1996–97, 1998–99

Hamburger SV

- DFB-Ligapokal: 2003
- UEFA Intertoto Cup: 2005

Iran

- Asian Games: 1998
- AFC Asian Cup third place: 1996, 2004
- AFC–OFC Challenge Cup: 2003

Individual

- AFC Goal of the Month: September 1997
- AFC Youth Player of the Year: 1997
- Bundesliga top assist provider: 2002–03
- AFC Player of the Year: 2003
- Asian Cup All-Star Team: 2004
- Hamburger SV All-time Team: 2012
- AFC Asian Cup Fans' All-time Best XI: 2018
- IFFHS Asian Men's Team of All Time: 2021
- AFC Asian Cup All-time XI: 2023

== See also ==
- List of men's footballers with 100 or more international caps

Sporting positions
Preceded by Ali Daei	Iran national football team captain 2006–2009	Succeeded by Javad Nekounam
