= Iran national football team =

Men's association football team

IR Iran
- Nicknames: Team Melli (National Team); other nicknames
- Association: Football Federation Islamic Republic of Iran (FFIRI)
- Confederation: AFC (Asia)
- Sub-confederation: CAFA (Central Asia)
- Head coach: Amir Ghalenoei
- Captain: Ehsan Hajsafi
- Most caps: Ehsan Hajsafi (150)
- Top scorer: Ali Daei (108) (Note: Daei has an additional cap and goal awarded by the Iranian FA but in a match that is not considered a full international by FIFA, which only counts 108 goals and 148 appearances.)
- Home stadium: Azadi Stadium
- FIFA code: IRN
First colours	Second colours

FIFA ranking
- Current: 23 (18 November 2026)
- Highest: 15 (August 2005)
- Lowest: 122 (May 1996)

First international
- Afghanistan 0–0 Iran (Kabul, Afghanistan; 25 August 1941)

Biggest win
- Iran 19–0 Guam (Tabriz, Iran; 24 November 2000)

Biggest defeat
- Turkey 6–1 Iran (Istanbul, Turkey; 28 May 1950); South Korea 5–0 Iran (Tokyo, Japan; 28 May 1958)

World Cup
- Appearances: 7 (first in 1978)
- Best result: Group stage (1978, 1998, 2006, 2014, 2018, 2022, 2026)

Asian Cup
- Appearances: 16 (first in 1968)
- Best result: Champions (1968, 1972, 1976)

Olympic Games
- Appearances: 4 (first in 1964)
- Best result: Quarter-finals (1976)

Afro-Asian Cup of Nations
- Appearances: 2 (first in 1978)
- Best result: Runners-up (1991)

AFC–OFC Challenge Cup
- Appearances: 1 (first in 2003)
- Best result: Champions (2003)
Medal record
Men's football
AFC Asian Cup
Gold medal – first place	1968 Iran	Team
Gold medal – first place	1972 Thailand	Team
Gold medal – first place	1976 Iran	Team
Bronze medal – third place	1980 Kuwait	Team
Bronze medal – third place	1988 Qatar	Team
Bronze medal – third place	1996 UAE	Team
Bronze medal – third place	2004 China	Team
Bronze medal – third place	2019 UAE	Team
Bronze medal – third place	2023 Qatar	Team
Asian Games
Gold medal – first place	1974 Tehran	Team
Gold medal – first place	1990 Beijing	Team
Gold medal – first place	1998 Bangkok	Team
Silver medal – second place	1951 New Delhi	Team
Silver medal – second place	1966 Bangkok	Team
WAFF Championship
Gold medal – first place	2000 Jordan	Team
Gold medal – first place	2004 Iran	Team
Gold medal – first place	2007 Jordan	Team
Gold medal – first place	2008 Iran	Team
Silver medal – second place	2010 Jordan	Team
Bronze medal – third place	2002 Syria	Team
CAFA Nations Cup
Gold medal – first place	2023 Kyrgyzstan and Uzbekistan	Team
Silver medal – second place	2025 Tajikistan and Uzbekistan	Team
Afro-Asian Cup of Nations
Silver medal – second place	1991 Iran and Algeria	Team
AFC–OFC Challenge Cup
Gold medal – first place	2003 Iran	Team

The Iran national football team (Note: Persian: تیم ملی فوتبال مردان ایران, romanized: Team-e Melli-ye Futbâl-e Mardân-e Irân). The team is officially recognised as IR Iran by FIFA since 2018.) have represented Iran in men's international football since their first international match in 1941. It is administered by the Football Federation Islamic Republic of Iran (FFIRI), the governing body of football in Iran, which is affiliated with the AFC and comes under the global jurisdiction of FIFA.

At the continental level, the country has won three AFC Asian Cup championships (1968, 1972, and 1976), three Asian Games (1974, 1990, and 1998), and the AFC–OFC Challenge Cup (2003). Regionally, Iran has won four WAFF Championships and one CAFA Nations Cup.

Iran's best performance at the global level was reaching the quarter-finals at the 1976 Summer Olympics. The team has qualified to the FIFA World Cup seven times (1978, 1998, 2006, 2014, 2018, 2022 and 2026). They have never progressed beyond the group stages, but have won three matches: against the United States in 1998, Morocco in 2018, and Wales in 2022.

== History ==
=== Early years ===
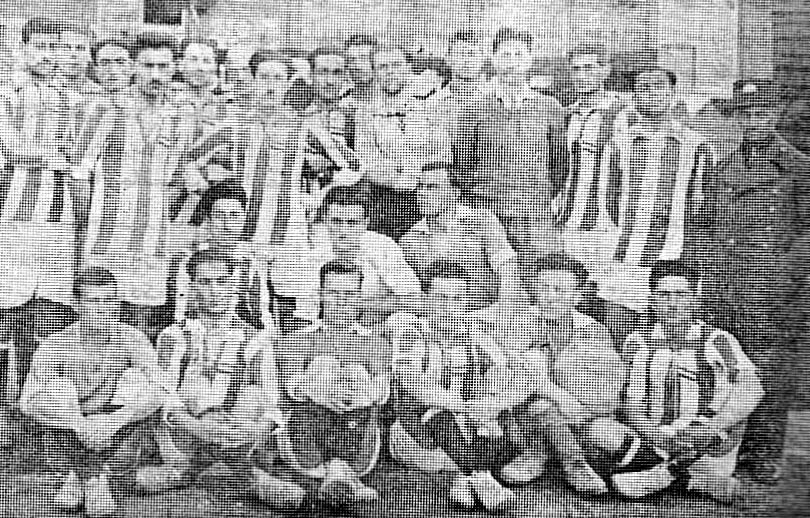
The first Iran football team that traveled to Baku, USSR in 1926

The Iranian Football Federation was founded in 1920. In 1926, Tehran XI (selected players from Tehran Club, Toofan, and Armenian Sports Club) traveled across the border to Baku, Soviet Union; this was the first away football match for an Iranian team. This Tehran Select team is the predecessor of Iran's national football team.

The first match that Team Melli played was on 23 August 1941, away at Kabul in a 1–0 win against British India while Iran's first FIFA international match was on 25 August 1941, away at Afghanistan.

Iran along with its Golden Generation of players such as Parviz Ghelichkhani, Ali Jabbari, Ali Parvin, Nasser Hejazi, Gholamhossein Mazloumi, and Homayoun Behzadi Won Three AFC Asian Cups in 1968, 1972, and 1976, the latter being their Most Recent Asian Cup Win. In 1978, Iran made its first appearance in the FIFA World Cup after defeating Australia in Tehran. They lost two of three group stage matches against the Netherlands and Peru, and only earned one point by drawing Scotland, in a match that saw Iraj Danaeifard cancel out an own goal scored by Andranik Eskandarian for a score of 1–1.

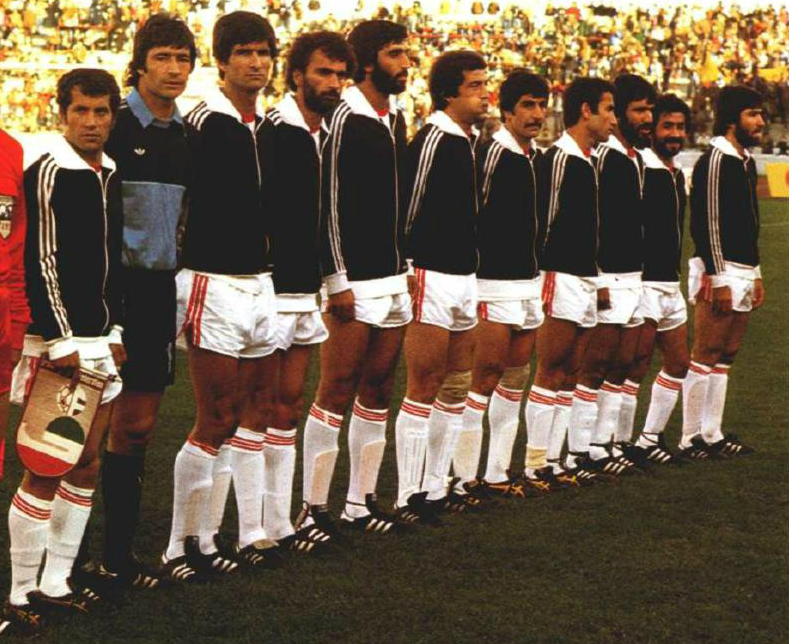
Iran playing in the 1978 World Cup against Scotland in Córdoba, Argentina

=== After the Iranian Revolution ===
After the Iranian Revolution, football was somewhat neglected. During the 1980s, the Iranian national team did not feature in World Cup competitions due to the Iran–Iraq War (1980–88) and domestic football embraced the inevitable effects of conflict. The national team withdrew from the Asian qualifiers for the 1982 FIFA World Cup and refused to participate in the qualifiers for the 1986 FIFA World Cup because of having to play on neutral ground. The war and political upheavals left Iran without major club competitions until 1989 when the Qods League was established. A year later, the Qods League was renamed the Azadegan League. Despite failing to qualify for both the 1990 and 1994 World Cups, it was said that during this period, a number of quality players burst onto the Iranian football scene laying the foundation for third place in the 1996 AFC Asian Cup (victories in that tournament included a 3–0 victory against Saudi Arabia and a 6–2 victory against South Korea) and their second stab at World Cup glory in 1998.

=== 1998–2006 ===
On 29 November 1997, Iran qualified for the 1998 FIFA World Cup after eliminating Australia in a close playoff series. After being tied 3–3 on aggregate, Iran advanced due to the away goals rule; Iran held Australia to a 1–1 draw at home, and a 2–2 draw in Melbourne.

At their first game at the 1998 FIFA World Cup against Yugoslavia, Iran lost 1–0 to a free kick by Siniša Mihajlović. Iran recorded their first World Cup victory in the second game beating and eliminating the United States 2–1 with Hamid Estili and Mehdi Mahdavikia scoring goals for Iran. The Iran-US World Cup match was preheated with certain excitement because of each country's political stance after the Iranian revolution and the Iran hostage crisis. However, in an act of defiance against all forms of hatred or politics in sports, both sides presented one another with gifts and flowers and took ceremonial pictures before the match kickoff. Iran played against Germany in the third game, losing 2–0 courtesy of goals from Oliver Bierhoff and Jürgen Klinsmann, finishing third in the group with 3 points.

Iran finished first in the group stage of the 2000 AFC Asian Cup but lost to South Korea in the quarter-finals. They failed to qualify for 2002 FIFA World Cup, held in Asia for the first time, after an aggregate defeat to the Republic of Ireland, losing 2–0 in Dublin and winning 1–0 in Tehran. The elimination saw manager Miroslav Blažević step down from the top spot to be replaced by his assistant Branko Ivanković who stepped up from assistant coach.

After qualifying to the 2004 AFC Asian Cup, Iran was drawn with Thailand, Oman and Japan in the tournament. Iran finished second in the group. In the quarter-final clash against South Korea, Iran won 4–3. They then lost to host China on penalty kicks, and won against Bahrain 4–2 to finish third place in the tournament.

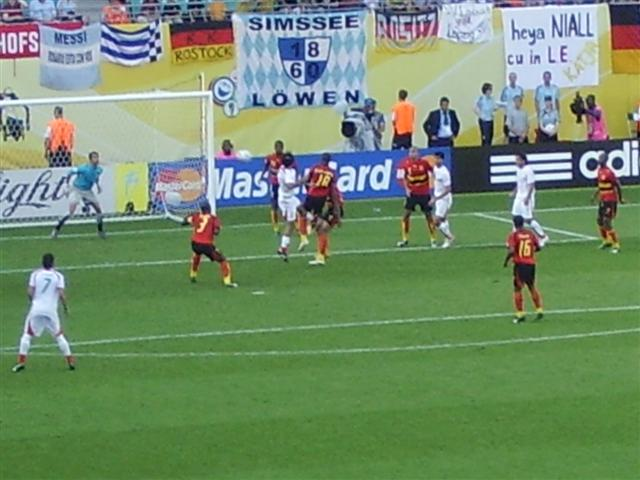
Iran scores against Angola at the 2006 FIFA World Cup.

On 8 June 2005, Iran and Japan became the first countries other than hosts Germany to qualify for the 2006 FIFA World Cup. The match between the two countries in Tehran, played on 24 March 2005, was the highest attended qualifying match among all confederations. The match ended with five fans dead and several others injured as they left the Azadi Stadium at the end of the match.

Iran started their 2006 FIFA World Cup appearance in Germany with a match against North America's Mexico in Group D. Being 1–1 at half-time, defensive mistakes led to a Mexican 3–1 win, with goals from Omar Bravo and Sinha. Yahya Golmohammadi scored the only Iranian goal. Team Melli played against Portugal in the second game, losing 2–0. The goals were scored by Deco and a penalty from Cristiano Ronaldo. Iran were eliminated from the competition before their third and final game against Angola, a 1–1 draw.

=== Temporary suspension ===
In November 2006, Iran was suspended by FIFA from all participation in international football on the grounds of governmental interference in the national football association. The ban lasted less than a month and as a dispensation was given to allow the Iran under-23 team to participate in the football competition of the 2006 Asian Games, fixtures were unaffected.

=== 2007–2014 ===
The IRIFF appointed Amir Ghalenoei as manager of Iran on 17 July 2006 to succeed Branko Ivanković. After finishing first in the 2007 AFC Asian Cup qualifying round two points ahead of South Korea, Iran placed first in the group stage of the final tournament in Malaysia, eventually losing to their qualifying opponents in a penalty shoot-out in the quarterfinals. His contract was not renewed and Team Melli was left with a caretaker manager for several months.

Then-leading international goalscorer Ali Daei was chosen to become the new manager after Spanish coach Javier Clemente had been closer to signing on as Iran's national team manager, when talks collapsed when he refused to live full-time in the country. Iran was placed with Kuwait, Syria and United Arab Emirates in the third round of 2010 FIFA World Cup qualifying. Ali Daei resigned from his position as the Iranian national coach on 29 March 2009, replaced by Afshin Ghotbi. Iran failed to qualify for the 2010 World Cup after finishing fourth overall in its group.

During the final game of the 2010 FIFA World Cup qualifiers against South Korea in Seoul on 17 June 2009, seven members of the team wore green wristbands in support of the Iranian Green Movement during the 2009 Iranian election protests. Initial rumors and false reports were that all seven players were banned for life by the Iranian Football Federation, however, state-run media claimed that all seven had "retired". On 24 June 2009, FIFA wrote to Iran's Football Federation asking for clarification on the situation. The Iranian Football Federation replied that no disciplinary action has been taken against any player.

Afshin Ghotbi renewed his contract until the end of 2011 AFC Asian Cup and the team qualified for the tournament with 13 points as group winners. During the final qualification match against South Korea, several Iranian players started the match wearing green armbands or wristbands, a symbol of protest at the outcome of the Iranian presidential election. Most removed them at half-time. The newspaper Iran reported that Ali Karimi, Mehdi Mahdavikia, Hosein Kaebi and Vahid Hashemian had received life bans from the Iranian FA for the gesture. However, the Iranian FA denied this claim in a response to FIFA's inquiry saying that "the comments in foreign media are nothing but lies and a mischievous act." Head coach Afshin Ghotbi also confirmed that it was a rumour and the Iranian FA "has not taken any official stand on this issue."

Afshin Ghotbi qualified Iran for the 2011 Asian Cup and finished second in the 2010 WAFF Championship just a few months before the Asian Cup. Iran were able to gain all nine possible points in the group stage of the Asian Cup but after an extra time goal from South Korea, Iran were yet again eliminated from the quarter-finals.

On 4 April 2011, former Real Madrid manager Carlos Queiroz agreed to a two-and-a-half-year deal to coach the Iranian national team until the end of the 2014 FIFA World Cup in Brazil. Under Queiroz, Iran began their 2014 FIFA World Cup qualification campaign successfully, defeating the Maldives 4–0 in the first leg of their second round of qualifiers. After winning 5–0 on aggregate, Iran advanced to the third round of qualifiers where they were drawn with Indonesia, Qatar and Bahrain.

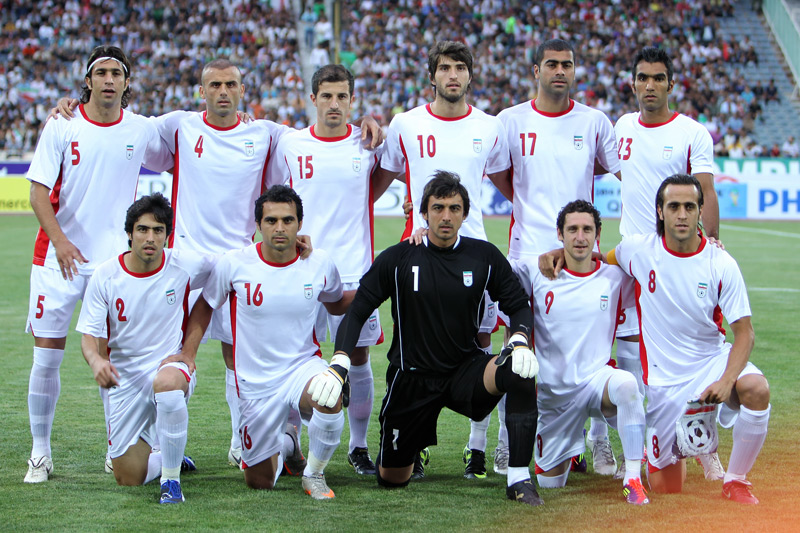
Iran's squad in July 2011 against Maldives. Manager: Carlos Queiroz. Standing left to right: Aghili, Hosseini, Haddadifar, Ansarifard, Zare, Pooladi; sitting left to right: Heydari, Norouzi, Rahmati, Khalatbari, Karimi.

Iran topped their group by defeating Bahrain 6–0 at home in the Azadi Stadium as well as inviting former German youth international Ashkan Dejagah who scored twice on his debut against Qatar. After a 4–1 win at Indonesia, Iran qualified for the final round of direct qualifiers, the fourth round. In the fourth round, Iran played South Korea, Qatar, Uzbekistan and Lebanon in their group. Queiroz made new foreign-based additions to his squad, adding players such as Reza Ghoochannejhad.

Iran started the fourth round of Asian qualifiers with a 1–0 win in Uzbekistan. Team Melli then drew Qatar and lost in Lebanon before defeating South Korea at the Azadi on 16 October with a goal from captain Javad Nekounam. After a 1–0 loss in Tehran against Uzbekistan, Iran defeated Qatar 1–0 in Doha and Lebanon 4–0 at home. In their last qualification match, Iran defeated South Korea 1–0 in Ulsan Munsu with a goal from Ghoochannejhad, clinching their ticket to Brazil as group winners with 16 points. Thus, Iran became the third team that Queiroz has managed to qualify for the World Cup, having reached the 2002 edition with South Africa and the 2010 edition with Portugal, leading the latter to a knockout stage finish. Iran continued their winning streak, securing qualification to the 2015 Asian Cup months later as well.

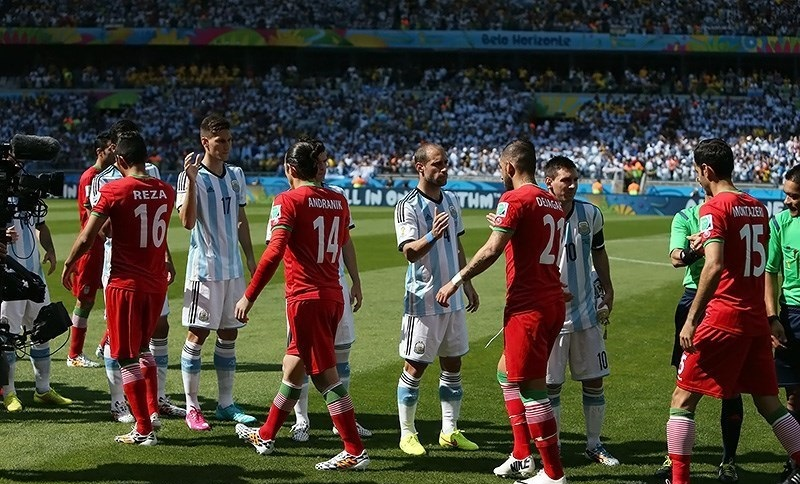
Iran v Argentina at the 2014 World Cup in Brazil

Since Queiroz's role as manager of the Iranian national team, he has introduced players from the Iranian diaspora to the national squad. These players include German-Iranians Daniel Davari and Ashkan Dejagah, Dutch-Iranian Reza Ghoochannejhad, Swedish-Iranians Omid Nazari and Saman Ghoddos, and Iranian-American Steven Beitashour among others.

Iran competed in Group F alongside Argentina, Nigeria and Bosnia and Herzegovina. Prior to the tournament, they founded the Central Asian Football Association.

In the opening match of the tournament on 16 June, Iran drew Nigeria 0–0 making it their first clean sheet in the World Cup. In their next match, Iran was defeated by Argentina 1–0 with a late goal from Lionel Messi and received praise after holding Argentina for 90 minutes while creating some attacking opportunities of their own. Iran was eliminated from the tournament in their next game, a 3–1 defeat to Bosnia and Herzegovina. Iran's lone goal was scored by Reza Ghoochannejhad. After the tournament, Queiroz declared he would resign as manager of Iran but later switched and extended his contract until the 2018 FIFA World Cup.

=== Late 2010s ===
Iran qualified for the 2015 AFC Asian Cup as group winners where Team Melli were the highest ranked seed. Iran faced Bahrain, Qatar and the UAE in Group C. With the second highest number of fans in the tournament after hosts Australia, the Iranians defeated Bahrain 2–0 with limited preparations. A defensive-minded Iran then defeated Qatar 1–0 thanks to a Sardar Azmoun goal before defeating UAE by the same scoreline to reach the top of their group. In the quarter-finals Iran faced Iraq who they had beaten weeks prior in a friendly match. Having received a controversial red card in the first half, Iran competed with ten men, managing to score goals late in extra time to draw the match 3–3. In the ensuing penalty shootout, Iran lost 7–6.

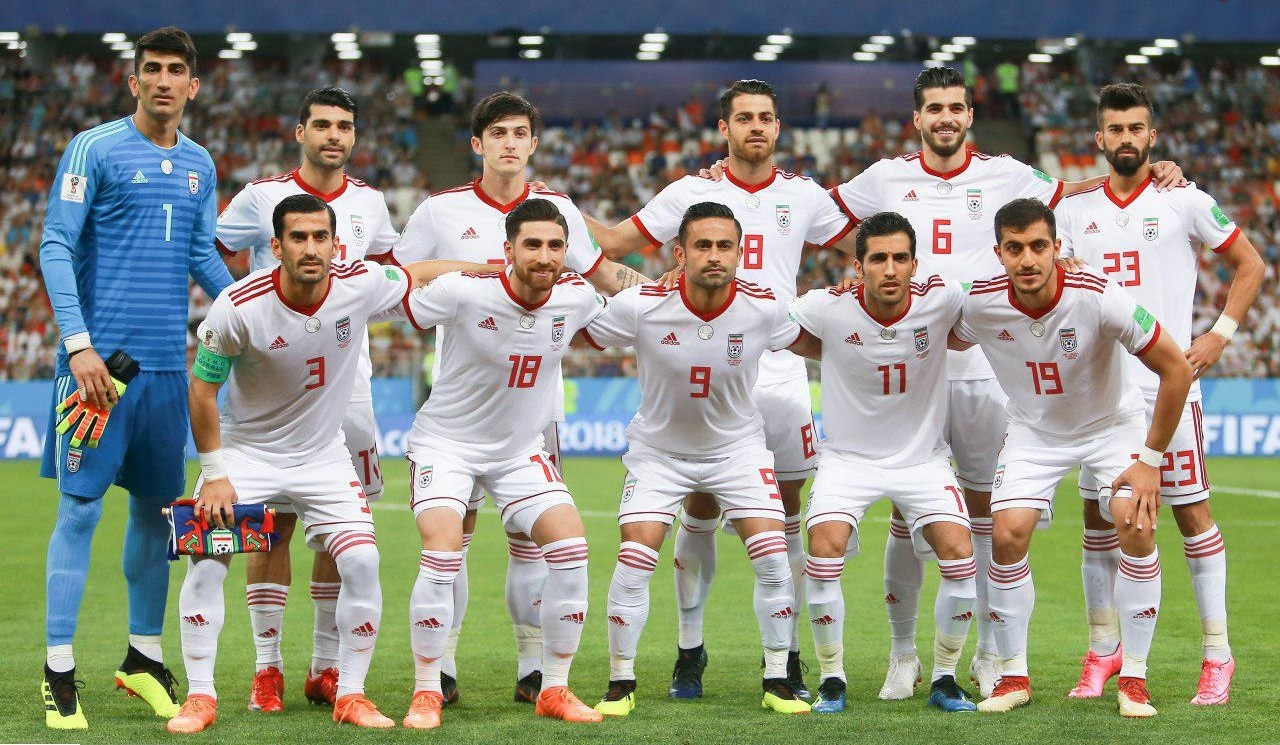
Iran's squad against Portugal in Mordovia Arena at the 2018 FIFA World Cup

Iran began their 2018 FIFA World Cup qualification campaign with friendly matches against Chile and Sweden in March 2015. Queiroz resigned from his managerial post thereafter due to disagreements with the Iranian Football Federation. On 14 April 2015, Iran were drawn with Oman, India, Turkmenistan and Guam in the second round of qualifiers. On 26 April, Queiroz announced that he would continue as the manager of Iran for their 2018 World Cup campaign. Iran became the second team to qualify for the 2018 World Cup after a 2–0 win at home over Uzbekistan on 12 June 2017. They also clinched first place in their qualification group after South Korea's defeat to Qatar.

Iran won the first match against Morocco after Aziz Bouhaddouz scoring an own goal. They then lost against Spain with a goal scored by Diego Costa, with video assistant referees denying an Iranian equalizer. The third match against Portugal ended in a draw after a penalty scored by Karim Ansarifard in the stoppage time, while Cristiano Ronaldo missed a penalty when Iran was trailing, with Alireza Beiranvand making a decisive save and because Morocco could only manage a 2–2 draw to Spain, Iran were eliminated. Iran's four points is the most received in any World Cup appearance.

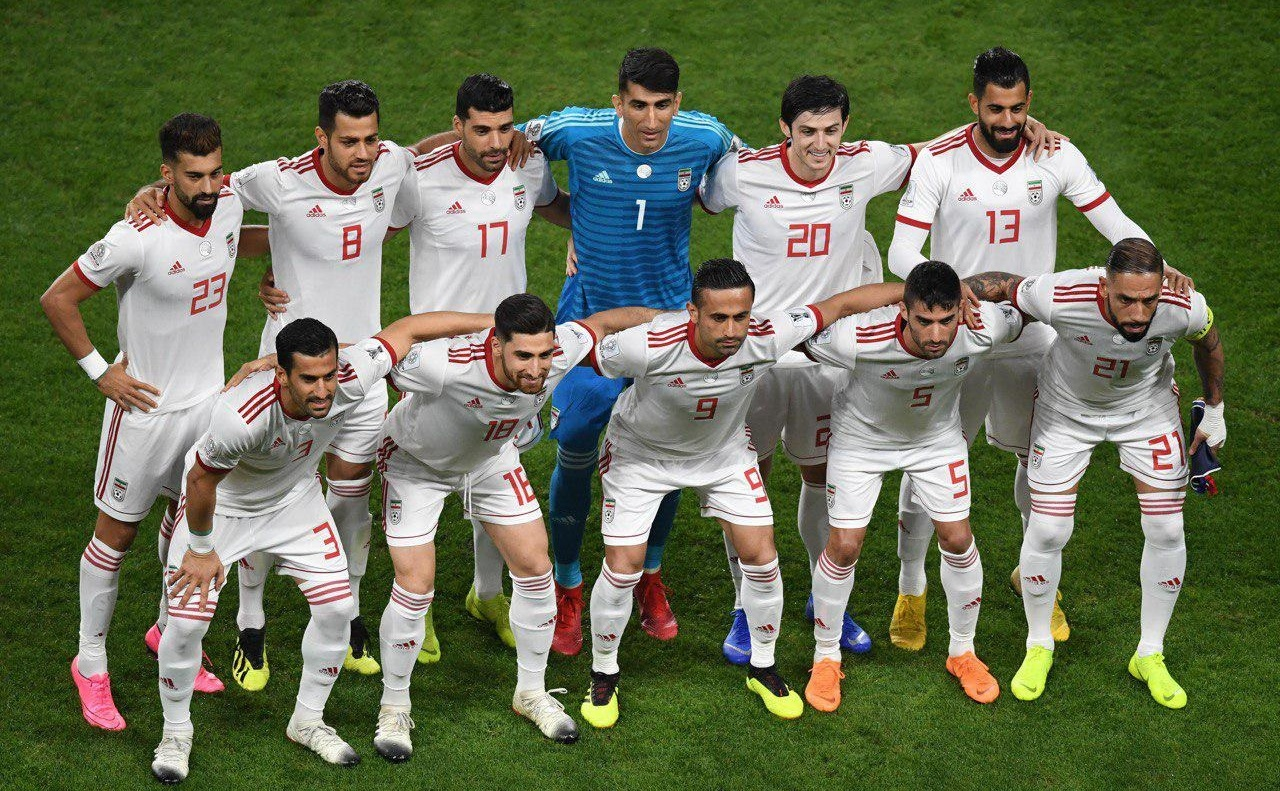
Iran's squad against China at the 2019 AFC Asian Cup

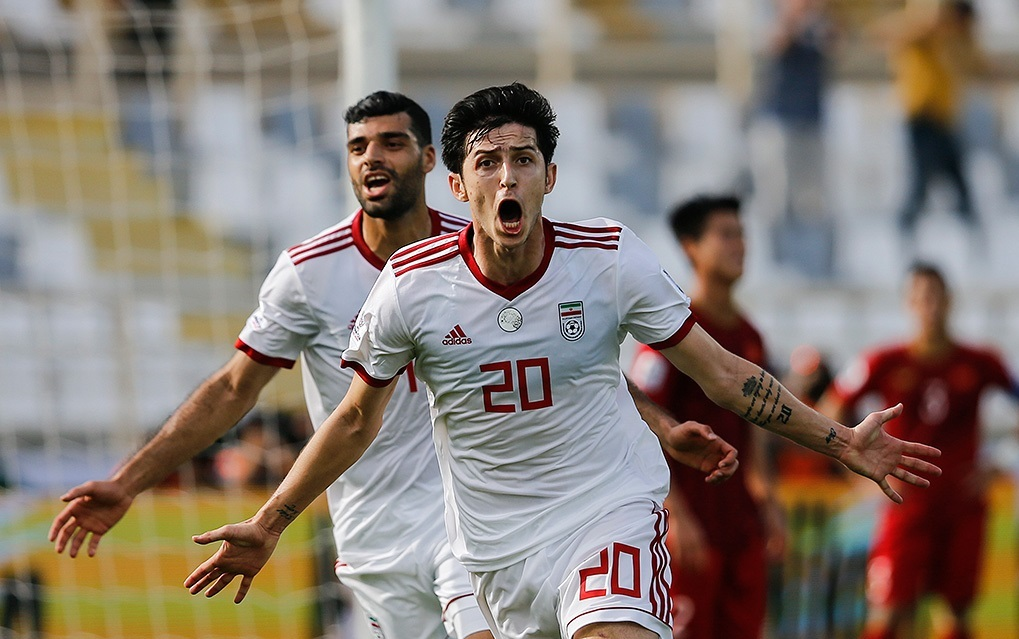
Azmoun and Taremi played a key role in the front line of the team in these years.

Having qualified for the 2019 AFC Asian Cup earlier, Iran was drawn into group D, where they shared fate with Iraq, Vietnam and Yemen. Iran opened their tournament against Yemen, nearly conceding a goal early but after 10 minutes, Iran regained the ground and proved more dominant in certain aspects, thrashing Yemen 5–0. A 2–0 win over the Vietnamese side gave Iran direct qualification to the knockout stage. Iran ended their group stage with a goalless draw over neighbor Iraq and took first place. After the group stage, Iran encountered Oman, with a defending mistake almost costing Iran's chances but Ahmed Mubarak Al-Mahaijri's penalty was saved by Alireza Beiranvand. Iran then defeated Oman 2–0 to reach the last eight. In the quarter-finals against a defensive China, Iran outclassed the Chinese 3–0 to meet Japan in the semi-finals. Iran missed the opportunity to reach the final once again when they fell 3–0 with all three goals scored in second half.

=== Early 2020s ===
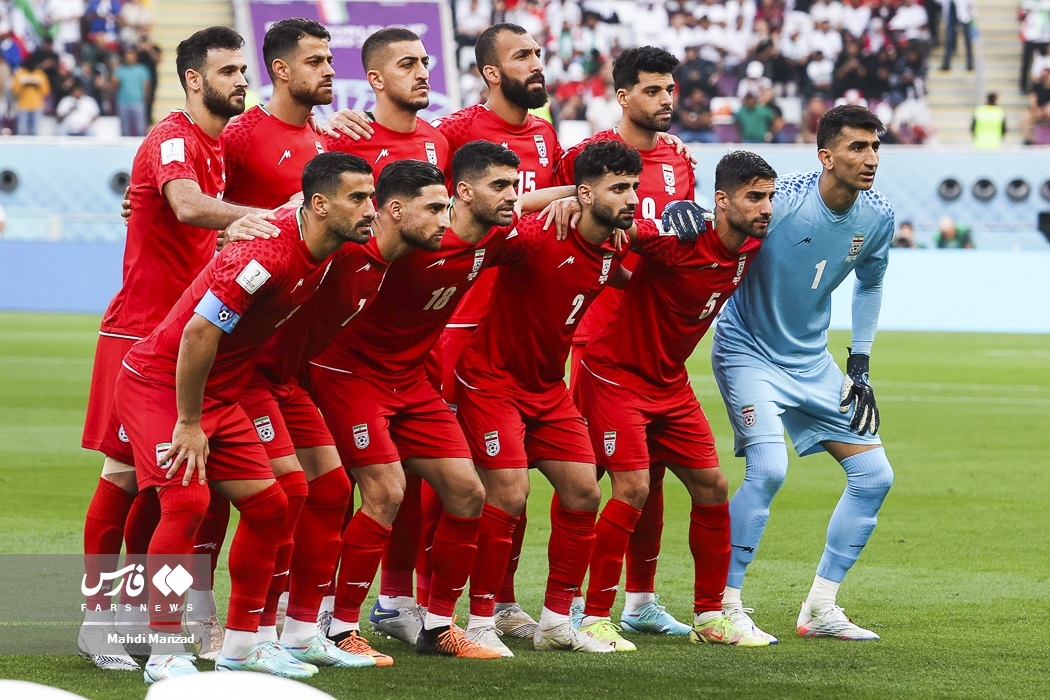
Iran's squad against England at the 2022 FIFA World Cup

Iran was the highest-ranked team to be seeded in the 2022 FIFA World Cup qualification, being drawn into the second round where they would deal with two Arab countries, Iraq and Bahrain, along with Cambodia and Hong Kong. Iran, under new Belgian manager Marc Wilmots, began with a 2–0 away win over Hong Kong. After the death of Sahar Khodayari, the 14–0 win over Cambodia allowed select Iranian women to enter the stadium for the first time since the 1979 Islamic Revolution. Their next away encounters against Bahrain and Iraq went on to be consecutive defeats which Iran lost 0–1 and 1–2, respectively. Following two consecutive draws between Iraq and Bahrain, Iran was left with the possibility of being eliminated from the World Cup outright in the second round, leading to the sacking of Marc Wilmots.

The COVID-19 pandemic in Iran forced the remaining fixtures to be played without spectators in June 2021, forcing Iran to play their remaining games in Bahrain under new coach Dragan Skočić; but with Bahrain losing its home support as an advantage, and Iraq assured a place in the final phase, Iran was able to stage a comeback, occupying first place and, together with Iraq, progressed to the final phase.

Iran became the thirteenth team to qualify for the 2022 FIFA World Cup after a 1–0 win at home over Iraq on 27 January 2022. In March 2022, Iranian women were again banned from entering the stadium for a World Cup qualifier. Iran's World Cup preparation friendly match against Canada at BC Place in June 2022 was cancelled by the Canadian Soccer Association amid opposition and mounting criticism, namely in regards to the Iranian government's role in shooting down Ukraine International Airlines Flight 752.

By the start of the World Cup in Qatar, Iran was the highest ranked team from Asia. In October 2022, calls were made to ban the Iranian national team from the World Cup for the Iranian government's blocking of Iranian women from their stadiums, their supplying of weapons to Russia during the invasion of Ukraine, and the treatment towards protesters during the Mahsa Amini protests. However, Iran started its World Cup campaign with a nightmare, losing 2–6 to England in the opening game as Iran suffered the worst ever loss in its FIFA World Cup history. The Iranian team notably made headlines in their opening match against England after refusing to sing the national anthem in solidarity with the Mahsa Amini protests, with some Iranian supporters cheering against their own team or boycotting their team amidst the ongoing protests as they felt the team was representing the government.

In the following match against Wales, amidst the boos and whistles from some of the Iranian supporters during the playing of the national anthem, the Iranian players were filmed singing the national anthem before defeating Wales 2–0 for their first-ever win over a European nation at the World Cup, with some protestors having their pre-revolutionary Lion and Sun flags and Women, Life, Freedom banners snatched from them by pro-government fans and stadium security at the Ahmad bin Ali Stadium. Protesters were harassed by government supporters with some protesters being detained by Qatari police, while stadium security confirmed they were given orders to confiscate anything but the flag of the Islamic Republic of Iran. Documents obtained by Iran International showed Iran was coordinating secret efforts with Qatar to control who attends the World Cup and restrict any signs of dissent.

Ahead of Iran's final group stage match against the United States, the Iranian players were allegedly called in to a meeting with members of the IRGC and were threatened with violence and torture for their families if they did not sing the national anthem or joined the protests against the Iranian regime. During the match, the Iranian players sang the national anthem again before losing to the United States 1–0 for the first time in their history and thereby being knocked out of the tournament, being the only team to finish third in the group with three points instead of four. Many Iranians celebrated the defeat and one Iranian man was killed by security forces in Bandar-e Anzali after honking his car horn in celebration. Another Iranian fan was also arrested by Qatari police after he was wearing a shirt with the Woman, Life, Freedom slogan.

During the FIFA World Cup as well as the 2023 AFC Asian Cup, the Iranian government reportedly sent paid members of the Basij and IRGC to cheer for the team in the stands. Iran were eventually knocked out in the semi-final of the Asian Cup by hosts Qatar. After the game, Iranian officials reportedly arrested ten teenagers in the city of Javanrud for celebrating the team's elimination from the tournament.

=== Late 2020s ===
==== 2026 FIFA World Cup Qualification ====
Iran qualified for the 2026 FIFA World Cup on 25 March 2025 following a 2–2 home draw against Uzbekistan in the third round of AFC qualification.

==== World Cup Draw and Pride Match Controversy ====
They were placed in pot 2 for the World Cup draw and were subsequently drawn into Group G alongside Belgium, Egypt, and New Zealand.

Prior to the draw, a group stage match scheduled to be played in Seattle was designated as a "Pride Match" by the City of Seattle to coincide with the city's annual Pride celebrations and to promote LGBT inclusion. Following the draw, the fixture was confirmed to be the match between Iran and Egypt. Both Iran and Egypt are countries where homosexuality is criminalized under domestic law, with Iran in particular having imposed capital punishment in certain cases. The Iranian Football Federation and the Egyptian Football Association objected to the match's designation; however, FIFA and local organizers confirmed that associated LGBT events would proceed, and that rainbow flags would be permitted inside the stadium.

==== 2025–26 Iranian Protests and Impact on Football ====
In January 2026, multiple Iranian footballers and athletes were killed by the Iranian regime during the 2026 Iran massacres amid the 2025–2026 Iranian protests, including former Tractor Sazi F.C. midfielder Mojtaba Tarshiz, prompting former Iran national team captain Masoud Shojaei to criticise FIFA for its silence over the killing of Iranian athletes during protests, while then-captain Mehdi Taremi expressed solidarity with the Iranian people.

Following the massacres, activists called on FIFA to ban the Iranian national team from the 2026 FIFA World Cup. Ali Karimi, a former footballer for the Iran national team, along with a coalition of prominent Iranians, wrote an open letter to FIFA and all its member associations, calling on FIFA president Gianni Infantino to speak up on the protest deaths. Following the protests and ensuing crackdown, the Spanish Football Federation reportedly pulled out of a planned friendly match with Iran.

Amid the Iran war, Sardar Azmoun was reportedly expelled from the national team after posting a picture of himself with the ruler of the UAE on social media. On 30 April 2026, protests were held outside the 2026 FIFA Congress in Vancouver, calling on FIFA to ban the Iranian team and stating that it represents and recruits players from the Islamic Revolutionary Guard Corps (IRGC) instead of the people of Iran.

On 19 May, it was reported that FIFA would again ban the pre-revolutionary Lion and Sun flag from World Cup stadiums, similar to previous World Cups. On 25 May, President Claudia Sheinbaum announced that Mexico will host the team for the World Cup after Trump administration refused to host the team in the United States during its war against Iran.

==== US visa disputes ====
According to reports, several members of the support staff for the Iranian national football team were denied entry visas to the United States, leading to a diplomatic dispute just days before the team was scheduled to compete in the 2026 FIFA World Cup. The Iranian embassy in Turkey issued a statement claiming that visas were refused for "a large part of the management and executive staff, technical advisors, and others who are an integral part of any national football team," arguing that the United States government was "effectively depriving the Iranian national team of its right to play in the World Cup under normal conditions and without undue pressure and stress."

Among those reportedly excluded from receiving visas was Mehdi Taj, the head of the Football Federation Islamic Republic of Iran (FFIRI). The Tasnim news agency reported that three additional FFIRI officials—executive director Mehdi Kharati, secretary general Hedayat Mombini, and media director Mohsen Motamedkia—had also not received visas, and were expected to travel with the team to Mexico while efforts to secure them continued. In response, the FFIRI issued a statement asserting that the conduct of the United States, as a co-host of the tournament, "contradicts international sporting rules," and that "the US government, continuing its hostile actions against the Iranian national team, has taken an unsportsmanlike and purely political decision to deny visas to key management and administrative members of the Iranian national football team." The federation also called on FIFA, as the world governing body of football, to pursue and finalize visa arrangements for the team's managerial, executive, technical, and support staff.

Meanwhile, Iran's ambassador to Mexico, Abolfazl Pasandideh, told reporters that the squad had been informed that under the terms of the visas issued, the team must enter and leave United States territory on the same day as its matches, adding: "We can enter in the morning and we must leave the same day."

=== 2026 World Cup ===
Despite the visa dispute and training in Mexico, the Iranian national team flew to the US for its first two games in the tournament. In the first game Iran came twice from behind to draw 2-2 against New Zealand, with R. Rezaeian M. Mohebi scoring for Iran. Mohammad Mohebi's goal celebration sparked controversy after he appeared to mimic a finger-gun gesture while celebrating. The match was already politically charged, with pre-revolutionary Iranian flags visible in the crowd despite FIFA's restrictions. The incident added another layer of debate, as social media users widely discussed the meaning and appropriateness of the celebration. Mohebi later denied any political intent, stating that it was simply a celebratory gesture and nothing more. In its second game Iran drew 0-0 against Belgium. It was reported that the team left a handwritten note in the dressing room of SoFi Stadium after the game calling for peace: "may peace, respect and friendship prevail among all nations". They left a similar message in the dressing room of Lumen Field after their third and final game of the tournament against Egypt which ended 1-1. Despite not qualifying for the knockout round, this was the first time Iran finished an iteration of the World Cup without a loss and became the only undefeated team to not advance to the knockout stage.

== Team image ==
=== Nicknames ===
The Iranian national team has received several nicknames by supporters and media. The most common one used is Team Melli (meaning "National Team" in Persian). Although the Iranian supporters have popularized Team Melli, other nicknames for the team include Shiran e Iran, ("Lions of Iran"), and "Princes of Persia" (used since AFC Asian Cup 2011). Iran's slogan for the 2014 FIFA World Cup was Honour of Persia, selected in an internet poll held by FIFA. A more recently used nickname, due to the presence of the Asiatic cheetah on the 2014 World Cup jersey, is Yuzpalangan which means "The Cheetahs"; the team mascot "Yupa" is also a cheetah, although this has been seen as a government propaganda ploy to wane people away from the lion nickname due to the pre-revolutionary Lion and Sun.

=== Kits and crests ===
Traditionally, Iran national football team's home kit is white, and the away kit is red. Sometimes, green shirts with white shorts and red socks are used.

==== Kit suppliers ====
The table below shows the history of kit suppliers for the Iranian national football team.

Kit supplier	Period
Adidas	1978
Puma	1980
Amini	1981–1993
Shekari	1993–1998
Puma	1998–2000
Shekari	2000–2003
Daei Sport	2003–2006
Puma	2006–2007
Merooj	2007–2008
Daei Sport	2008–2009
Legea	2009–2012
Uhlsport	2012–2016
Givova	2016
Adidas	2016–2019
Uhlsport	2019–2022
Merooj	2022–present

=== Sponsorship ===
On 1 February 2014, Iran announced the addition of the endangered Asiatic cheetah on their 2014 FIFA World Cup kits to bring attention to its conservation efforts.

=== Rivalries ===
Iran and Iraq are neighboring rivals. According to the Malay Mail, "Emotions are always high when Iran and Iraq meet on the football pitch". In the contemporary era, especially during the reign of Saddam Hussein, the two countries had worsened relations and fought the Iran–Iraq War for 8 years. In 2001, for the first time in decades, an Iran-Iraq match was not held at a neutral venue. The rivalry was escalated after Iraq knocked Iran out of the 2015 AFC Asian Cup in controversial circumstances. Iran leads the series with 18 wins, 8 draws and 6 losses.

Iran and Saudi Arabia are ideological rivals. The game was ranked eighth in Goal.com's 2010 list of "Football's 10 Greatest International Rivalries". and ninth in Bleacher Report's 2014 list of "International Football's 10 Most Politically-Charged Football Rivalries" All of their matches have been competitive; none of them were friendlies. The first match was played on 24 August 1975, with Iran defeating Saudi Arabia 3–0. Iran leads the series with 5 wins, 6 draws and 4 losses.

Iran and South Korea are competitive rivals with over 50 years of history. As two of the leading teams in the continent in the 1970s, the rivalry is among the most storied in Asian football. Since their initial meeting in the 1958 Asian Games, they have faced off in a total of 32 games. South Korea frequently held the upper hand in the early years of the competition, but things started to shift in the twenty-first century. Iran has triumphed six times since 2006, while Korea has only defeated them once—by a score of 1–0 at the Asian Cup in 2011. Before Korea recovered its footing in 2017 and pushed the Middle Eastern team to a tie the past three times they faced off, Iran won four straight games after the 2011 AFC Asian Cup.

Outside of MENA and Central Asia, Team Melli has some fierce rivalries with East Asian powerhouses, like Japan. Also Australia, despite being a major team in Asia/Pacific, has not met Iran since joining the AFC in 2006.

=== Stadiums ===
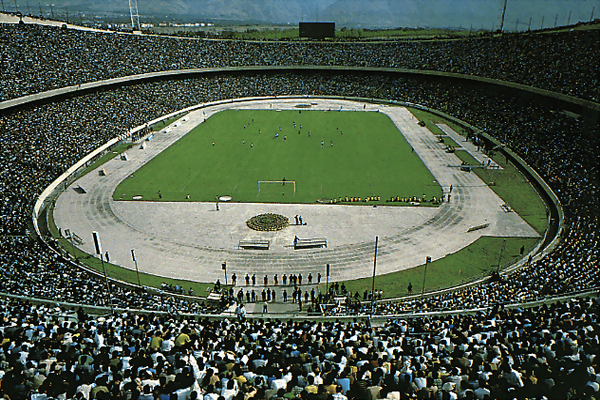
Azadi Stadium, 1991

Since 1972, Iran's national stadium has been Tehran's Azadi Stadium with a nominal capacity of 78,116 spectators. Azadi Stadium is the 28th largest association football stadium in the world, seventh in Asia and first in West Asia. A record was set in Azadi for the 1998 FIFA World Cup qualifier against Australia with over 128,000 in attendance. Since 1979, the government restricts Iranian women from entering the stadiums. However, FIFA condemned the move and wrote to Iranian Football Federation in June 2019. The federation in their letter gave deadline to uplift the restrictions and let women enter the stadiums. On 25 August 2019, deputy Sports Minister Jamshid Taghizadeh stated: "Women can go to Tehran's Azadi stadium to watch the match between Iran's national team and Cambodia in October for the Qatar World Cup qualifier." After the death of Sahar Khodayari, select Iranian women were allowed to attend the match against Cambodia in October 2019. However, in March 2022, Iranian women were again blocked from entering the stadium for a FIFA World Cup qualifier.

From 1942 to 1972, Amjadieh Stadium was Iran's national stadium. Other stadiums that Iran has played international games at are Bagh Shomal and Yadegar Emam Stadium (Tabriz), Takhti Stadium (Tehran), Enghelab Stadium (Karaj), Hafezieh Stadium (Shiraz), Takhti Stadium and Imam Reza Stadium (Mashhad).

The Iran National Football Camp is the team's training ground.

== Results and fixtures ==
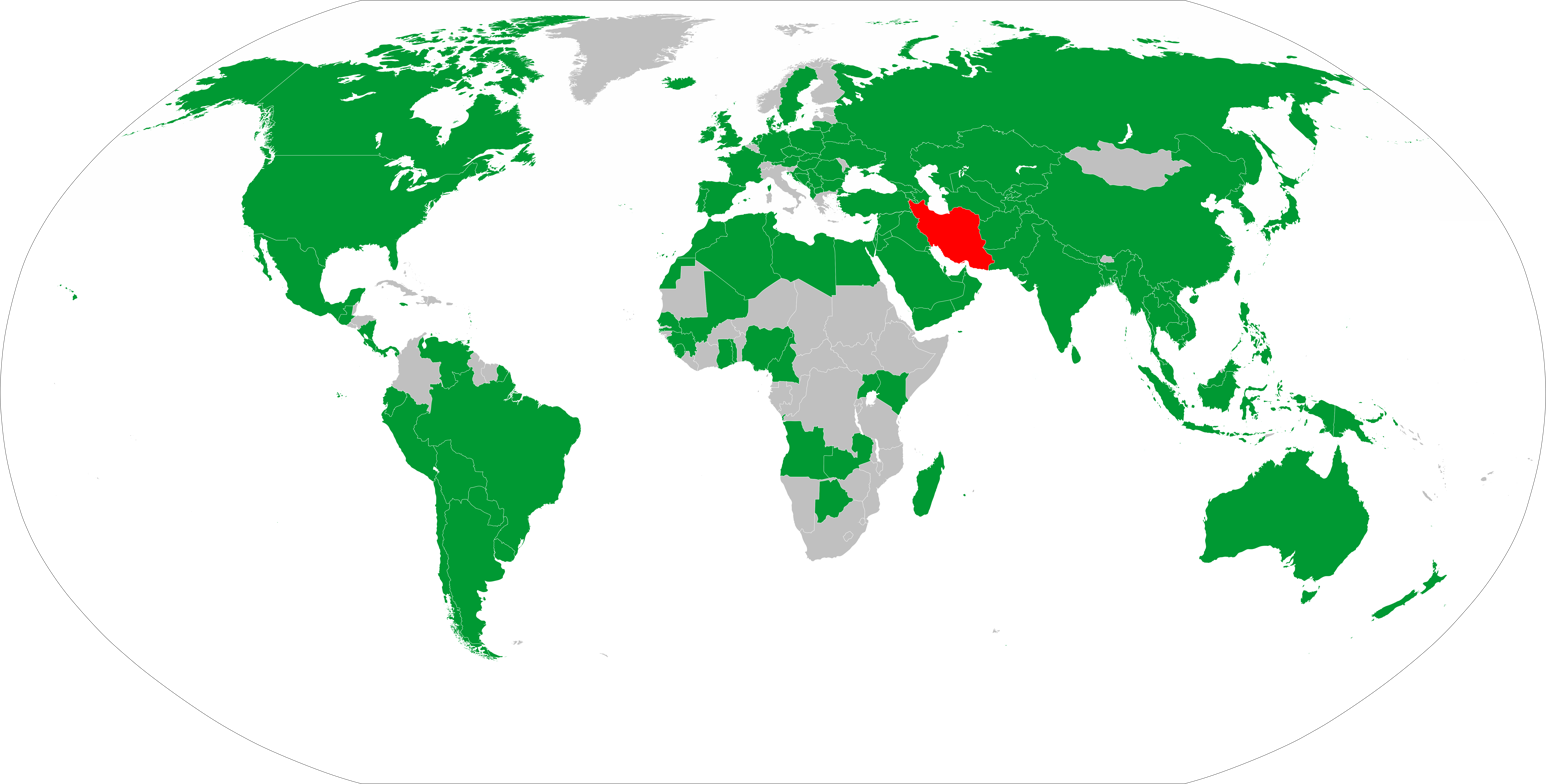
All opponents that the Iran football team has played at least once

The following is a list of match results in the last 12 months, as well as any future matches that have been scheduled.

Win Draw Loss Fixture

=== 2026 ===
27 March 2026 Jordan International Tournament	Iran	1–2	Nigeria	Antalya, Turkey (Note: The four nation tournament between Jordan, Iran, Nigeria, and Costa Rica were moved from Amman, Jordan to Antalya, Turkey due to the travel restrictions from the 2026 Iran war.)
15:30 UTC+3	Taremi 67'	Report	Simon 6'; Adams 51'	Stadium: Mardan Sports Complex; Attendance: 0 Referee: Cihan Aydın (Turkey)

31 March 2026 Jordan International Tournament	Iran	5–0	Costa Rica	Antalya, Turkey
16:00 UTC+3	Gholizadeh 10'; Taremi 19' (pen.), 34' (pen.); Mohebi 31'; Ghayedi 54'	Report		Stadium: Mardan Sports Complex; Referee: Cihan Aydin (Turkey)

29 May Friendly	Iran	3–1	Gambia	Antalya, Turkey
14:00	Yousefi 47'; Rezaeian 59'; Taremi 68'	Report	O. Colley 42'	Stadium: Mardan Sports Complex; Referee: Atilla Karaoğlan (Turkey)

4 June Friendly	Iran	2–0	Mali	Antalya, Turkey
17:30	Ezatolahi 12'; Rezaeian 55'	N/A		Stadium: Mardan Sports Complex; Attendance: 0

15 June 2026 FIFA World Cup Group G	Iran	2–2	New Zealand	Inglewood, California, United States
18:00 UTC−7	Rezaeian 32'; Mohebi 64'	Report	Just 7', 54'	Stadium: SoFi Stadium; Attendance: 70,108; Referee: César Arturo Ramos (Mexico)

21 June 2026 FIFA World Cup Group G	Belgium	0–0	Iran	Inglewood, California, United States
12:00 UTC−7		Report		Stadium: SoFi Stadium; Attendance: 70,317; Referee: Darío Herrera (Argentina)

26 June 2026 FIFA World Cup Group G	Egypt	1–1	Iran	Seattle, Washington, United States
20:00 UTC−7	Saber 5'	Report	Rezaeian 14'	Stadium: Lumen Field; Attendance: 66,925; Referee: Szymon Marciniak (Poland)

24 September Friendly	Uzbekistan	3–1	Iran	Ferghana, Uzbekistan
19:00 UTC+5	Shomurodov 10', 58' (pen.); Norchaev 90+4'	Report	Urozov 49' (o.g.)	Stadium: Istiqlol Stadium; Attendance: 17,978; Referee: Kirill Levnikov (Russia)

29 September Friendly	Russia	2–0	Iran	Kazan, Russia
18:00 UTC+3	Golovin 21', 36'	Report		Stadium: Kazan Arena; Attendance: 34,362; Referee: Ilgiz Tantashev (Uzbekistan)

14 November 2026 Basra International Tournament	Iran	2–0	Palestine	Basra, Iraq
18:00 UTC+3	Azmoun 76'; Hardani 84'	Report		Stadium: Basra International Stadium; Referee: Mohanad Qasim Sarray (Iraq)

17 November 2026 Basra International Tournament	Iraq	1–1	Iran	Basra, Iraq
19:15 UTC+3	Al-Saedi 1'	Report	Hazbavi 83'	Stadium: Basra International Stadium; Referee: Ammar Ashlanani (Kuwait)

=== 2027 ===
9 January 2027 Asian Cup GS	Iran	v	China	Riyadh, Saudi Arabia
--:--				Stadium: Kingdom Arena

13 January 2027 Asian Cup GS	Kyrgyzstan	v	Iran	Riyadh, Saudi Arabia
--:--				Stadium: Al Shabab Stadium

18 January 2027 Asian Cup GS	Iran	v	Syria	Riyadh, Saudi Arabia
--:--				Stadium: King Fahd Sports City Stadium

== Coaching staff ==
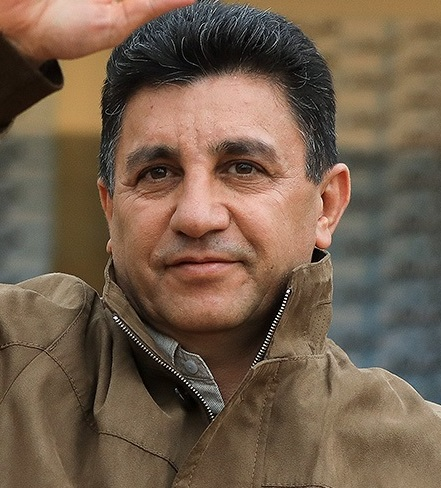
Current head coach Amir Ghalenoei

Position	Name
Head Coach	(Iran) Amir Ghalenoei
Assistant Coach(es)	(Iran) Rahman Rezaei
Assistant Coach(es)	(Iran) Mehrdad Khanban
Assistant Coach(es)	(Iran) Saeed Alhoei
Assistant Coach(es)	(Iran) Human Afazeli
Goalkeeping Coach	(Romania) Alin Dincă
Fitness Coach	(Spain) Pepe Losada
Physiotherapist	(Iran) Alireza Shahab
Team Doctor	(Iran) Parhan Khanlari
Masseurs	(Iran) Amir Esmaeili
Masseurs	(Iran) Hadi Nejatpour
Team Supervisor	(Iran) Mehdi Kharati
Team Management	(Iran) Mahdi Mohammadnabi

== Players ==
=== Current squad ===
The following 29 players were called up for the 2026 Basra International Tournament matches against Palestine and Iraq on 14 and 17 November 2026, respectively.

Information correct as of 17 November 2026, after the match against Iraq.

No.	Pos.	Player	Date of birth (age)	Caps	Goals	Club
1	GK	Payam Niazmand	6 April 1995 (age 31)	17	0	(Football Federation Islamic Republic of Iran) Persepolis
12	GK	Mohammad Khalifeh	19 August 2004 (age 22)	1	0	(Football Federation Islamic Republic of Iran) Aluminium Arak
22	GK	Habib Far Abbasi	4 September 1997 (age 29)	1	0	(Football Federation Islamic Republic of Iran) Esteghlal
30	GK	Adib Zarei	16 April 2003 (age 23)	0	0	(Football Federation Islamic Republic of Iran) Shams Azar
2	DF	Saleh Hardani	26 December 1998 (age 27)	24	2	(Football Federation Islamic Republic of Iran) Esteghlal
3	DF	Abolfazl Razzaghpour	17 September 1997 (age 29)	0	0	(Football Federation Islamic Republic of Iran) Foolad
4	DF	Saman Fallah	12 May 2001 (age 25)	8	0	(Football Federation Islamic Republic of Iran) Esteghlal
5	DF	Amin Hazbavi	6 May 2003 (age 23)	9	1	(Football Federation Islamic Republic of Iran) Sepahan
13	DF	Mohammad Mehdi Zare	25 January 2003 (age 23)	0	0	(Football Federation Islamic Republic of Iran) Persepolis
14	DF	Arya Yousefi	22 April 2002 (age 24)	19	1	(Football Federation Islamic Republic of Iran) Sepahan
19	DF	Ali Nemati	7 February 1996 (age 30)	25	0	(Qatar Football Association) Lusail
23	DF	Jafar Salmani	12 January 1997 (age 29)	4	0	(Iraq Football Association) Al-Talaba
27	DF	Hossein Goudarzi	4 May 2001 (age 25)	2	0	(Football Federation Islamic Republic of Iran) Esteghlal
33	DF	Aref Aghasi	2 January 1997 (age 29)	7	0	(Football Federation Islamic Republic of Iran) Esteghlal
6	MF	Saeid Ezatolahi (vice-captain)	1 October 1996 (age 30)	90	2	(United Arab Emirates Football Association) Shabab Al-Ahli
7	MF	Mohammad Javad Hosseinnejad	26 June 2003 (age 23)	6	0	(Russian Football Union) Dynamo Makhachkala
8	MF	Mohammad Mohebi	20 December 1998 (age 27)	42	15	(Croatian Football Federation) Rijeka
10	MF	Mohammad Mehdi Mohebi	10 February 2000 (age 26)	8	2	(Football Federation Islamic Republic of Iran) Persepolis
11	MF	Mehdi Limouchi	23 November 1999 (age 26)	2	0	(Football Federation Islamic Republic of Iran) Sepahan
15	MF	Amirmohammad Razzaghinia	11 April 2006 (age 20)	6	0	(Football Federation Islamic Republic of Iran) Esteghlal
16	MF	Mohammad Ghorbani	21 May 2001 (age 25)	21	0	(United Arab Emirates Football Association) Al-Wahda
17	MF	Esmaeil Gholizadeh	18 January 2006 (age 20)	1	0	(Football Federation Islamic Republic of Iran) Esteghlal
18	FW	Amirhossein Hosseinzadeh	30 October 2000 (age 26)	22	5	(Football Federation Islamic Republic of Iran) Tractor
21	MF	Omid Noorafkan	9 April 1997 (age 29)	45	1	(Football Federation Islamic Republic of Iran) Sepahan
26	MF	Afshin Sadeghi	7 July 2005 (age 21)	2	0	(Football Federation Islamic Republic of Iran) Nassaji Mazandaran
	MF	Amirhossein Farsi	23 May 2007 (age 19)	0	0	(Football Federation Islamic Republic of Iran) Kheybar Khorramabad
20	FW	Sardar Azmoun (captain)	1 January 1995 (age 31)	95	58	(United Arab Emirates Football Association) Shabab Al-Ahli
24	FW	Dennis Eckert	9 January 1997 (age 29)	4	0	(Royal Belgian Football Association) Standard Liège
	FW	Kasra Taheri	6 August 2006 (age 20)	3	0	(Football Federation Islamic Republic of Iran) Sepahan

=== Recent call-ups ===
The following players have been called up to the national team in the past 12 months but are not part of the current squad.

Pos.	Player	Date of birth (age)	Caps	Goals	Club	Latest call-up
GK	Alireza Beiranvand	21 September 1992 (age 34)	90	0	(Iran) Fajr Sepasi	v. Russia, 29 September 2026
GK	Hossein Hosseini	30 June 1992 (age 34)	14	0	(Iran) Sepahan	v. Russia, 29 September 2026
DF	Ehsan Hajsafi	25 February 1990 (age 36)	150	7	(Iran) Sepahan	v. Russia, 29 September 2026
DF	Ramin Rezaeian	21 March 1990 (age 36)	79	10	(Iran) Foolad	v. Russia, 29 September 2026
DF	Shojae Khalilzadeh	14 May 1989 (age 37)	63	2	(Iran) Tractor	v. Russia, 29 September 2026
DF	Mohammad Naderi	5 October 1996 (age 30)	3	0	(Iran) Tractor	v. Russia, 29 September 2026
DF	Milad Mohammadi	29 September 1993 (age 33)	79	1	(Belarus) Maxline Vitebsk	v. Egypt, 27 June 2026
DF	Hossein Kanaanizadegan	23 March 1994 (age 32)	67	6	(Iran) Persepolis	v. Egypt, 27 June 2026
DF	Danial Eiri	26 October 2003 (age 23)	0	0	(Iran) Persepolis	2026 FIFA World Cup
DF	Danial Esmaeilifar	18 March 1993 (age 33)	6	0	(Iran) Tractor	Tehran Training Camp, 19 April 2026
DF	Hossein Abarghouei	17 September 1997 (age 29)	1	0	(Iran) Persepolis	Tehran Training Camp, 19 April 2026
DF	Masoud Mohebi	6 February 2005 (age 21)	0	0	(Iran) Kheybar Khorramabad	Tehran Training Camp, 19 April 2026
DF	Abolfazl Jalali	26 June 1998 (age 28)	8	0	(Iran) Persepolis	v. Costa Rica, 31 March 2026
MF	Amir Hossein Mahmoudi	12 July 2006 (age 20)	5	0	(Iran) Persepolis	v. Russia, 29 September 2026
MF	Aref Haji Eydi	6 April 1999 (age 27)	1	0	(Iran) Sepahan	v. Russia, 29 September 2026
MF	Milad Sourgi	11 February 2002 (age 24)	0	0	(Iran) Shams Azar	v. Russia, 29 September 2026
MF	Alireza Jahanbakhsh	11 August 1993 (age 33)	101	17	(Netherlands) Excelsior	v. Egypt, 27 June 2026
MF	Saman Ghoddos^{RET}	6 September 1993 (age 33)	71	3	(United Arab Emirates) Kalba	v. Egypt, 27 June 2026
MF	Mahdi Torabi	10 September 1994 (age 32)	53	7	(Iran) Tractor	v. Belgium, 21 June 2026
MF	Rouzbeh Cheshmi	24 July 1993 (age 33)	40	3	(Iran) Esteghlal	2026 FIFA World Cup
MF	Hadi Habibinejad	17 October 1995 (age 31)	1	0	(Iran) Tractor	2026 FIFA World Cup ^{PRE}
MF	Mehdi Hashemnejad	27 October 2001 (age 25)	7	0	(Iran) Tractor	Tehran Training Camp, 19 April 2026
MF	Ali Gholizadeh	10 March 1996 (age 30)	44	7	(Poland) Lech Poznań	v. Costa Rica, 31 March 2026
FW	Mehdi Taremi	18 July 1992 (age 34)	111	60	(United Arab Emirates) Al Wasl	v. Russia, 29 September 2026
FW	Shahab Zahedi	18 August 1995 (age 31)	2	0	(Malaysia) Johor Darul Ta'zim	v. Russia, 29 September 2026
FW	Shahriyar Moghanlou	21 December 1994 (age 31)	24	2	(Iran) Tractor	v. Egypt, 27 June 2026
FW	Mehdi Ghayedi	5 December 1998 (age 27)	31	10	(United Arab Emirates) Al-Nasr	v. New Zealand, 16 June 2026
FW	Ali Alipour	11 November 1995 (age 31)	15	1	(Iran) Persepolis	v. New Zealand, 16 June 2026
FW	Ehsan Mahroughi	9 December 1998 (age 27)	0	0	(Iran) Foolad	Tehran Training Camp, 19 April 2026
FW	Pouria Shahrabadi	15 June 2006 (age 20)	0	0	(Iran) Persepolis	Tehran Training Camp, 19 April 2026
^{INJ} Withdrew due to injury^{PRE} Preliminary squad / standby^{RET} Retired from the national team^{SUS} Serving suspension^{WD} Player withdrew from the squad due to a non-injury issue.

== Player records ==
As of 17 November 2026
Statistics include official FIFA-recognised matches only.
Players in bold are still active with Iran.

=== Most appearances ===
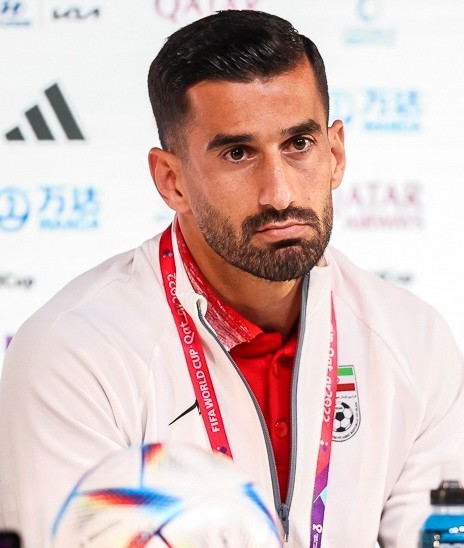
Ehsan Hajsafi is Iran's most capped player.

Rank	Player	Caps	Goals	Career
1	**Ehsan Hajsafi** (Note: Hajsafi has an additional cap awarded by the Iranian FA for the match vs. Iraq on 18 March 2017, but it has not mentioned by FIFA.)	150	7	2008–present
2	Javad Nekounam (Note: Nekounam has two additional caps awarded by the Iranian FA. Those matches are not considered full internationals by FIFA, which only counts 149 appearances.)	149	38	2000–2015
3	Ali Daei	148	108	1993–2006
4	Ali Karimi	127	38	1998–2012
5	Jalal Hosseini	115	8	2007–2018
6	**Mehdi Taremi**	111	60	2015–present
7	Mehdi Mahdavikia	110	13	1996–2009
8	Karim Ansarifard	104	30	2009–2024
9	**Alireza Jahanbakhsh**	101	17	2013–present
9	Andranik Teymourian	101	9	2005–2016

=== Top goalscorers ===
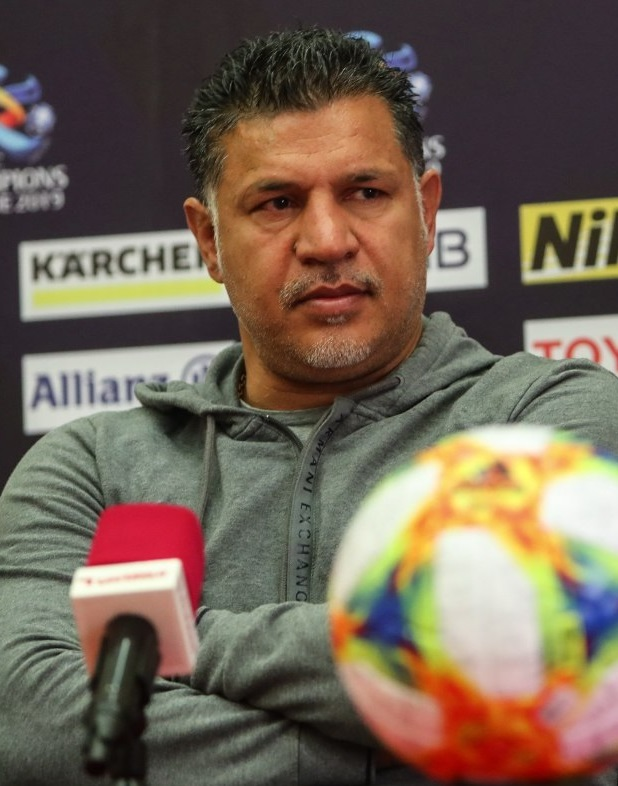
Ali Daei is the world's third all-time leading goalscorer in international matches, having scored 108 goals in 148 matches.

Rank	Player	Goals	Caps	Ratio	Career
1	Ali Daei (list)	108	148	0.73	1993–2006
2	**Mehdi Taremi**	60	111	0.54	2015–present
3	**Sardar Azmoun**	58	95	0.61	2014–present
4	Karim Bagheri	50	87	0.57	1993–2010
5	Ali Karimi	38	127	0.3	1998–2012
5	Javad Nekounam	38	149	0.26	2000–2015
7	Karim Ansarifard	30	104	0.29	2009–2024
8	Gholam Hossein Mazloumi	19	40	0.48	1969–1977
9	Farshad Pious	18	34	0.53	1984–1994
10	Reza Ghoochannejhad	17	44	0.39	2012–2018
10	**Alireza Jahanbakhsh**	17	101	0.17	2013–present

=== Most capped goalkeepers ===
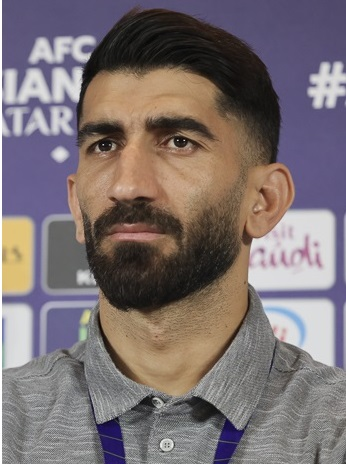
Alireza Beiranvand, goalkeeper.

Rank	Player	Caps	Career
1	**Alireza Beiranvand**	90	2015–present
2	Mehdi Rahmati	76	2004–2012
3	Ahmad Reza Abedzadeh	73	1987–1998
4	Ebrahim Mirzapour	70	2001–2011
5	Nasser Hejazi	62	1968–1980
6	Behzad Gholampour	27	1990–1999
7	Aziz Asli	24	1962–1968
8	Alireza Haghighi	23	2012–2018
9	Mansour Rashidi	20	1972–1985
9	Parviz Boroumand	20	1998–2001

=== Captains ===
#	Reign	Player	Career	Total		As Captain		Tournaments
#	Reign	Player	Career	Caps	Goals	Caps	Goals	Tournaments
1	1965–1967	Mohammad Ranjbar	1959–1967	23	0	9	0	
2	1967–1970	Hassan Habibi	1958–1970	31	0	8	0	1968 AFC Asian Cup
3	1970–1972	Mostafa Arab	1959–1972	48	2	8	0	1972 AFC Asian Cup
4	1972–1977	Parviz Ghelichkhani	1964–1977	64	12	15	3	1976 AFC Asian Cup
5	1977–1980	Ali Parvin	1970–1980	76	13	29	2	1978 FIFA World Cup
6	1980	Nasser Hejazi	1968–1980	62	0	5	0	1980 AFC Asian Cup
7	1980–1984	Mehdi Dinvarzadeh	1977–1984	26	0	7	1	
8	1984–87; 1989–91	Mohammad Panjali	1978–1991	45	0	27	0	1984 AFC Asian Cup
9	1987–89; 1991–93	Sirous Ghayeghran	1986–1993	43	6	16	2	1988 AFC Asian Cup; 1992 AFC Asian Cup
10	1993	Hamid Derakhshan	1980–1993	41	9	14	4	
11	1993–1994	Farshad Pious	1984–1994	34	18	1	0	
12	1996	Mojtaba Moharrami	1988–1996	37	5	0	0	1996 AFC Asian Cup
13	1996–1998	Ahmad Reza Abedzadeh	1988–1998	73	0	29	0	1998 FIFA World Cup
14	1998–1999	Nader Mohammadkhani	1988–1999	64	1	5	0	1998 FIFA World Cup
15	1999–2000	Javad Zarincheh	1987–2000	80	1	4	0	
16	2000–2006	Ali Daei	1993–2006	148	108	84	60	2000 AFC Asian Cup; 2004 AFC Asian Cup; 2006 FIFA World Cup
17	2006–2009	Mehdi Mahdavikia	1996–2009	110	13	17	1	2007 AFC Asian Cup
18	2009–2015	Javad Nekounam	2000–2015	149	38	39	10	2011 AFC Asian Cup; 2014 FIFA World Cup; 2015 AFC Asian Cup
19	2015–2016	Andranik Teymourian	2005–2016	101	9	7	0	
20	2016–2017	Jalal Hosseini	2007–2018	115	8	3	0	
21	2016–2019	Masoud Shojaei	2004–2019	87	8	9	0	2018 FIFA World Cup; 2019 AFC Asian Cup
22	2019–2024; 2026–	**Ehsan Hajsafi**	2008–	150	7	45	3	2022 FIFA World Cup; 2023 AFC Asian Cup; 2026 FIFA World Cup
23	2024–2026	Alireza Jahanbakhsh	2013–	101	17	20	6	

== Competitive record ==
=== FIFA World Cup ===
FIFA World Cup finals record										FIFA World Cup qualification record					
Year	Round	Position	Pld	W	D	L	GF	GA	Squad	Pld	W	D	L	GF	GA
(Uruguay) 1930	Not a FIFA member									No qualification					
(Italy) 1934	Not a FIFA member									Not a FIFA member					
(France) 1938	Not a FIFA member									Not a FIFA member					
(Brazil) 1950	Did not enter									Did not enter					
(Switzerland) 1954	Did not enter									Did not enter					
(Sweden) 1958	Did not enter									Did not enter					
(Chile) 1962	Did not enter									Did not enter					
(England) 1966	Did not enter									Did not enter					
(Mexico) 1970	Did not enter									Did not enter					
(West Germany) 1974	Did not qualify									8	5	1	2	9	6
(Argentina) 1978	First group stage	14th	3	0	1	2	2	8	Squad	12	10	2	0	20	3
(Spain) 1982	Withdrew									Withdrew					
(Mexico) 1986	Disqualified									Disqualified					
(Italy) 1990	Did not qualify									6	5	0	1	12	5
(United States) 1994	Did not qualify									11	5	3	3	23	13
(France) 1998	Group stage	20th	3	1	0	2	2	4	Squad	17	8	6	3	57	17
(South Korea) (Japan) 2002	Did not qualify									14	9	3	2	36	9
(Germany) 2006	Group stage	25th	3	0	1	2	2	6	Squad	12	9	1	2	29	7
(South Africa) 2010	Did not qualify									14	5	8	1	15	9
(Brazil) 2014	Group stage	28th	3	0	1	2	1	4	Squad	16	10	4	2	30	7
(Russia) 2018	Group stage	18th	3	1	1	1	2	2	Squad	18	12	6	0	36	5
(Qatar) 2022	Group stage	26th	3	1	0	2	4	7	Squad	18	14	1	3	49	8
(Canada) (Mexico) (United States) 2026	Group stage	33rd	3	0	3	0	3	3	Squad	16	11	4	1	35	12
(Morocco) (Portugal) (Spain) 2030	To be determined									To be determined					
(Saudi Arabia) 2034	To be determined									To be determined					
Total	First round	7/20	21	3	7	11	16	34	—	162	103	39	20	351	101

Iran's World Cup record
First match	Netherlands 3–0 Iran (3 June 1978; Mendoza, Argentina)
Biggest win	Wales 0–2 Iran (25 November 2022; Al Rayyan, Qatar)
Biggest defeat	England 6–2 Iran (21 November 2022; Al Rayyan, Qatar)
Fastest Goal	14th minute, Ramin Rezaeian, vs Egypt (26 June 2026; Seattle, United States)
Latest goal	90+13th minute, Mehdi Taremi, vs England (21 November 2022; Al Rayyan, Qatar)

=== AFC Asian Cup ===
AFC Asian Cup record										Qualification record					
Year	Round	Position	Pld	W	D	L	GF	GA	Squad	Pld	W	D	L	GF	GA
(Hong Kong) 1956	Withdrew									Withdrew					
(South Korea) 1960	Did not qualify									6	3	1	2	12	10
(Israel) 1964	Withdrew									Withdrew					
(Iran) 1968	Champions	1st	4	4	0	0	11	2	Squad	Qualified as hosts					
(Thailand) 1972	Champions	1st	5	5	0	0	12	4	Squad	Qualified as champions					
(Iran) 1976	Champions	1st	4	4	0	0	13	0	Squad	Qualified as hosts					
(Kuwait) 1980	Third place	3rd	6	3	2	1	16	6	Squad	Qualified as champions					
(Singapore) 1984	Fourth place	4th	6	2	4	0	8	3	Squad	6	6	0	0	22	2
(Qatar) 1988	Third place	3rd	6	2	2	2	3	4	Squad	4	2	2	0	6	1
(Japan) 1992	Group stage	5th	3	1	1	1	2	1	Squad	2	2	0	0	10	0
(United Arab Emirates) 1996	Third place	3rd	6	3	2	1	14	6	Squad	6	6	0	0	27	1
(Lebanon) 2000	Quarter-finals	6th	4	2	1	1	7	3	Squad	6	4	1	1	16	2
(China) 2004	Third place	3rd	6	3	3	0	14	8	Squad	6	5	0	1	16	5
(Indonesia) (Malaysia) (Thailand) (Vietnam) 2007	Quarter-finals	6th	4	2	2	0	6	3	Squad	6	4	2	0	12	2
(Qatar) 2011	Quarter-finals	7th	4	3	0	1	6	2	Squad	6	4	1	1	11	2
(Australia) 2015	Quarter-finals	6th	4	3	1	0	7	3	Squad	6	5	1	0	18	5
(United Arab Emirates) 2019	Semi-finals	3rd	6	4	1	1	12	3	Squad	8	6	2	0	26	3
(Qatar) 2023	Semi-finals	3rd	6	4	1	1	12	7	Squad	8	6	0	2	34	4
(Saudi Arabia) 2027	Qualified									6	4	2	0	16	4
Total	3 titles	16/19	74	45	20	9	143	55	—	76	57	12	7	226	41

Iran's AFC Asian Cup record
First match	Iran 2–0 Hong Kong (10 May 1968; Tehran, Iran)
Biggest win(s)	Iran 8–0 South Yemen (8 June 1976; Tehran, Iran)
Biggest defeat(s)	South Korea 3–0 Iran (11 December 1988; Doha, Qatar) Iran 0–3 Japan (28 January 2019; Al Ain, UAE)
Best result	Champions in 1968, 1972 and 1976
Worst result	1992 (group stage)

=== Olympic Games ===
Summer Olympics record										Qualification record					
Year	Round	Position	Pld	W	D	L	GF	GA	Squad	Pld	W	D	L	GF	GA
(France) 1900	Not an IOC member									No qualification					
(United States) 1904	Not an IOC member									No qualification					
(United Kingdom) 1908	Not an IOC member									No qualification					
(Sweden) 1912	Not an IOC member									No qualification					
(Belgium) 1920	Not an IOC member									No qualification					
(France) 1924	Not an IOC member									No qualification					
(Netherlands) 1928	Not an IOC member									No qualification					
(Germany) 1936	Not an IOC member									No qualification					
(United Kingdom) 1948	Did not enter									No qualification					
(Finland) 1952	Did not enter									No qualification					
(Australia) 1956	Withdrew									Withdrew					
(Italy) 1960	Did not enter									Did not enter					
(Japan) 1964	First round	12th	3	0	1	2	1	6	Squad	6	4	1	1	14	3
(Mexico) 1968	Withdrew									Withdrew					
(West Germany) 1972	First round	12th	3	1	0	2	1	9	Squad	5	3	2	0	6	0
(Canada) 1976	Quarter-finals	7th	3	1	0	2	4	5	Squad	4	3	1	0	8	1
(Soviet Union) 1980	Qualified but later withdrew									6	4	2	0	22	2
(United States) 1984	Did not enter									Did not enter					
(South Korea) 1988	Did not qualify									2	1	0	1	2	2
1992–present	See Iran national under-23 team									See Iran national under-23 team					
Total	Quarter-finals	4/17	9	2	1	6	6	20	—	23	15	6	2	52	8

=== Asian Games ===
Asian Games record
Year	Round	Position	Pld	W	D	L	GF	GA	Squad
(India) 1951	Runners-up	2nd	3	2	0	1	2	1	Squad
(Philippines) 1954	Did not enter								
(Japan) 1958	Preliminary round	14th	2	0	0	2	0	9	Squad
(Indonesia) 1962	Did not enter								
(Thailand) 1966	Runners-up	2nd	7	4	0	3	9	6	Squad
(Thailand) 1970	Preliminary round	8th	2	0	1	1	2	3	Squad
(Iran) 1974	Champions	1st	7	7	0	0	20	1	Squad
(Thailand) 1978	Did not enter								
(India) 1982	Quarter-finals	8th	4	2	0	2	3	2	Squad
(South Korea) 1986	Quarter-finals	6th	5	3	1	1	13	2	Squad
(China) 1990	Champions	1st	5	4	1	0	7	1	Squad
(Japan) 1994	Preliminary round	9th	4	1	2	1	5	2	Squad
(Thailand) 1998	Champions	1st	8	7	0	1	25	7	Squad
2002–present	See Iran national under-23 team								
Total	3 titles	10/13	47	30	5	12	86	34	—

=== WAFF Championship ===
WAFF Championship record
Year	Round	Position	Pld	W	D	L	GF	GA	Squad
(Jordan) 2000	Champions	1st	5	4	1	0	7	1	Squad
(Syria) 2002	Third place	3rd	4	1	2	1	4	3	Squad
(Iran) 2004	Champions	1st	4	4	0	0	17	3	Squad
(Jordan) 2007	Champions	1st	4 (Note: Iran played their B team in this tournament, however all matches are recognised as international "A" matches.)	3	1	0	5	1	Squad
(Iran) 2008	Champions	1st	4	4	0	0	13	2	Squad
(Jordan) 2010	Runners-up	2nd	4	2	1	1	8	5	Squad
(Kuwait) 2012	Group stage	6th	3	1	2	0	2	1	Squad
(Qatar) 2014	Did not enter								
2019–onwards	Not a WAFF member								
Total	4 titles	7/8	28	19	7	2	56	16	—

=== CAFA Nations Cup ===
CAFA Nations Cup record
Year	Round	Position	Pld	W	D	L	GF	GA	Squad
(Kyrgyzstan) (Uzbekistan) 2023	Champions	1st	3	3	0	0	12	2	Squad
(Tajikistan) (Uzbekistan) 2025	Runners-up	2nd	4	2	1	1	8	4	Squad
Total	1 title	2/2	7	5	1	1	20	6	—

=== RCD Cup/ECO Cup ===
RCD Cup/ECO Cup record (Defunct) (Note: The tournament was not organized by an official sub-confederation, but was part of a socio-economic pact between its member states. Therefore, it is not considered an official regional tournament.)
Year	Round	Position	Pld	W	D	L	GF	GA	Squad
(Iran) 1965	Champions	1st	2	1	1	0	4	1	Squad
(Pakistan) 1967	Runners-up	2nd	2	1	0	1	2	1	Squad
(Turkey) 1969	Runners-up	2nd	2	1	0	1	4	6	Squad
(Iran) 1970	Champions	1st	2 (Note: Match against Turkey XI is not recognized as international "A" match.)	1	1	0	8	1	Squad
(Pakistan) 1974	Runners-up	2nd	2 (Note: Iran sent Malavan F.C. to this tournament, therefore matches against Pakistan and Turkey are not recognized as international "A" matches.)	1	0	1	2	2	Squad
(Iran) 1993	Champions	1st	4	4	0	0	10	2	Squad
Total	3 titles	6/6	14	9	2	3	30	13	—
Only "A" matches	3 titles	6/6	11	8	1	2	27	10	—

=== Afro-Asian Cup of Nations ===
Afro-Asian Cup of Nations record (Defunct)
Year	Round	Position	Pld	W	D	L	GF	GA	Squad
(Ghana) (Iran) 1978	Not completed (Note: The trophy was not awarded, because the second leg was cancelled.)		1	1	0	0	3	0	Squad
(Cameroon) (Saudi Arabia) 1985	Did not qualify								
(Qatar) 1987	Did not qualify								
(Algeria) (Iran) 1991	Runners-up	2nd	2	1	0	1	2	2	Squad Squad
(Japan) 1993	Did not qualify								
(Nigeria) (Uzbekistan) 1995	Did not qualify								
(Saudi Arabia) (South Africa) 1997	Did not qualify								
(Japan) 2007	Did not qualify								
Total	Runners-up	2/8	3	2	0	1	5	2	—

=== AFC–OFC Challenge Cup ===
AFC–OFC Challenge Cup record (Defunct)
Year	Round	Position	Pld	W	D	L	GF	GA	Squad
(Japan) 2001	Did not qualify								
(Iran) 2003	Champions	1st	1	1	0	0	3	0	Squad
Total	1 title	1/2	1	1	0	0	3	0	—

== Head-to-head record ==
As of 17 November 2026

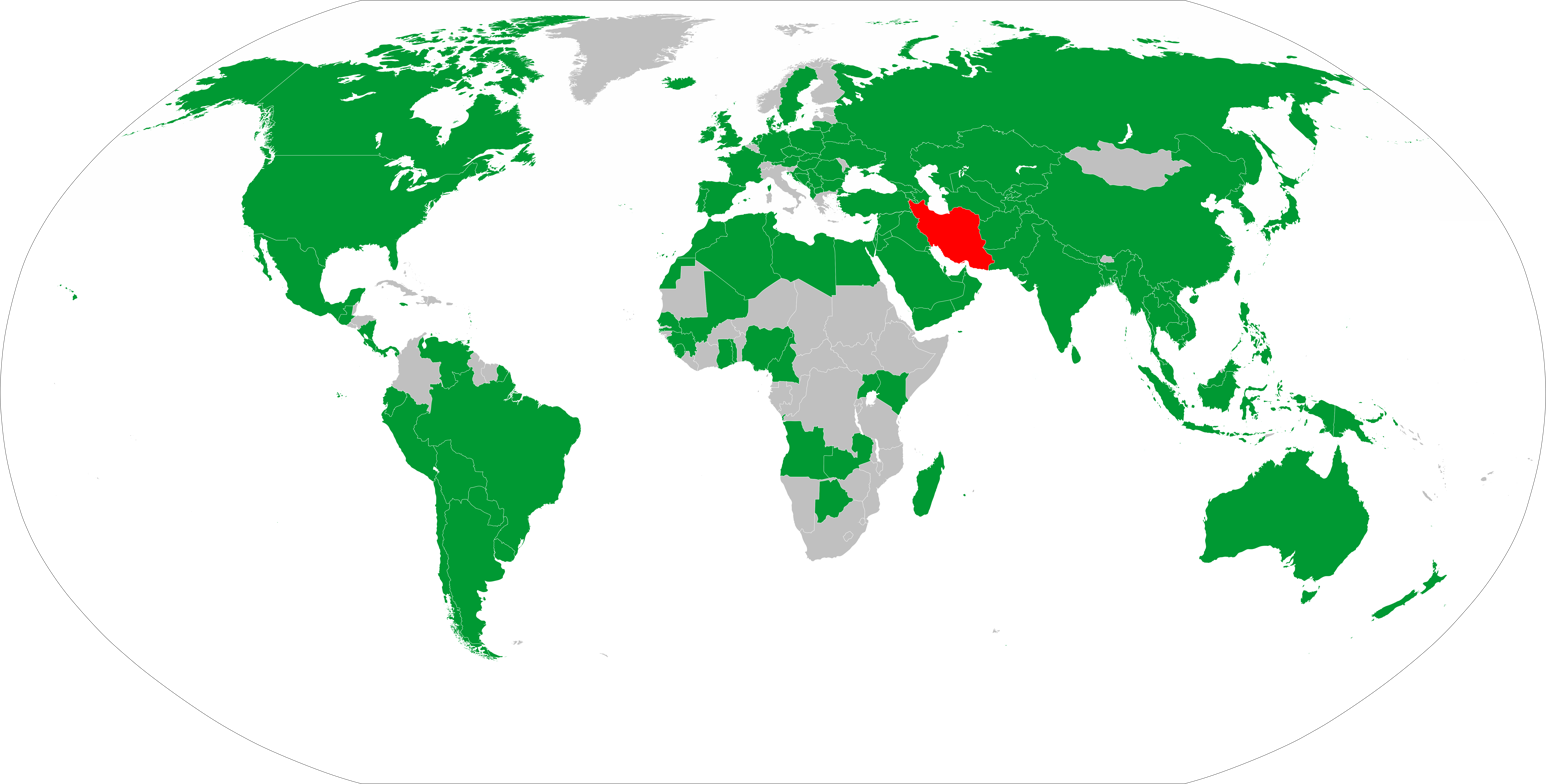
Iran national football team all opponents

The list shown below shows the Iran national football team all-time international record against opposing nations.

Team	Pld	W	D	L	GF	GA	GD	Confederation	Best win	Worst loss
Afghanistan	4	3	1	0	13	2	+11	AFC	6–1	X
Albania	1	0	0	1	0	1	−1	UEFA	X	0–1
Algeria	4	2	0	2	5	5	0	CAF	2–1	1–2
Angola	4	2	2	0	7	2	+5	CAF	4–0	X
Argentina	2	0	1	1	1	2	−1	CONMEBOL	X	0–1
Armenia	1	1	0	0	3	1	+2	UEFA	3–1	X
Australia	6	3	2	1	7	6	+1	AFC / OFC	2–0	0–3
Austria	1	0	0	1	1	5	−4	UEFA	X	1–5
Azerbaijan	3	2	1	0	4	2	+2	UEFA	2–1	X
Bahrain	18	8	5	5	32	13	+19	AFC	6–0	2–4
Bangladesh	6	6	0	0	28	1	+27	AFC	6–0	X
Belgium	1	0	1	0	0	0	0	UEFA	X	X
Belarus	3	0	2	1	3	4	−1	UEFA	X	1–2
Bolivia	1	1	0	0	2	1	+1	CONMEBOL	2–1	X
Bosnia and Herzegovina	7	5	1	1	19	10	+9	UEFA	4–0	1–3
Botswana	1	0	1	0	1	1	0	CAF	X	X
Brazil	2	1	0	1	1	3	−2	CONMEBOL	1–0	0–3
Bulgaria	2	1	1	0	2	1	+1	UEFA	1–0	X
Burkina Faso	1	1	0	0	2	1	+1	CAF	2–1	X
Cambodia	4	4	0	0	28	1	+27	AFC	14–0	X
Cameroon	2	0	2	0	1	1	0	CAF	X	X
Canada	3	2	0	1	2	1	+1	CONCACAF	1–0	0–1
Cape Verde	1	0	1	0	0	0	0	CAF	X	X
Chile	3	1	1	1	4	3	+1	CONMEBOL	2–0	1–2
China	23	13	6	4	39	18	+21	AFC	4–0	0–2
Chinese Taipei	5	5	0	0	22	0	+22	AFC	6–0	X
Costa Rica	3	2	1	0	8	2	+6	CONCACAF	5–0	X
Croatia	2	0	1	1	2	4	−2	UEFA	X	0–2
Cyprus	1	0	1	0	0	0	0	UEFA	X	X
Czech Republic	1	0	0	1	0	1	−1	UEFA	X	0–1
Denmark	1	0	1	0	0	0	0	UEFA	X	X
Ecuador	3	0	2	1	2	3	−1	CONMEBOL	X	0–1
Egypt	2	0	2	0	2	2	0	CAF	X	X
England	1	0	0	1	2	6	−4	UEFA	X	2–6
Gambia	1	1	0	0	3	1	+2	CAF	3–1	X
France	1	0	0	1	1	2	−1	UEFA	X	1–2
Georgia	1	1	0	0	2	1	+1	UEFA	2–1	X
Germany	2	0	0	2	0	4	−4	UEFA	X	0–2
Ghana	2	2	0	0	5	0	+5	CAF	3–0	X
Guam	3	3	0	0	31	0	+31	AFC	19–0	X
Guatemala	1	0	1	0	2	2	0	CONCACAF	X	X
Guinea	2	0	1	1	2	3	−1	CAF	X	1–2
Hong Kong	9	9	0	0	23	3	+20	AFC	4–0	X
Hungary	3	0	0	3	1	6	−5	UEFA	X	0–2
Iceland	1	1	0	0	1	0	+1	UEFA	1–0	X
India	9	6	1	2	20	6	+14	AFC	4–0	1–3
Indonesia	6	5	1	0	16	3	+13	AFC	5–0	X
Iraq	29	16	7	6	38	22	+16	AFC	3–0	1–2
Ireland, Republic of	3	1	0	2	2	4	−2	UEFA	1–0	0–2
Israel	5	3	1	1	7	6	+1	UEFA / AFC	3–0	0–4
Jamaica	2	2	0	0	9	1	+8	CONCACAF	8–1	X
Japan	19	7	6	6	21	22	−1	AFC	2–0	0–3
Jordan	14	7	3	4	18	11	+7	AFC	4–1	2–3
Kazakhstan	2	2	0	0	5	0	+5	UEFA / AFC	3–0	X
Kenya	3	3	0	0	6	1	+5	CAF	3–0	X
Korea, North	20	16	4	0	34	9	+25	AFC	3–0	X
Korea, South	33	13	10	10	34	36	−2	AFC	6–2	0–5
Kuwait	30	13	10	7	39	31	+8	AFC	3–1	0–3
Kyrgyzstan	6	6	0	0	25	4	+21	AFC	7–0	X
Laos	3	3	0	0	20	1	+19	AFC	7–0	X
Lebanon	12	10	1	1	31	3	+28	AFC	5–0	0–1
Libya	1	1	0	0	4	0	+4	CAF	4–0	X
Lithuania	1	1	0	0	1	0	+1	UEFA	1–0	X
Macedonia, North	3	2	1	0	7	3	+4	UEFA	3–1	X
Madagascar	1	1	0	0	1	0	+1	CAF	1–0	X
Malaysia	4	4	0	0	8	0	+8	AFC	3–0	X
Maldives	6	6	0	0	42	0	+42	AFC	17–0	X
Mali	2	1	0	1	3	2	+1	CAF	2–0	1–2
Mauritania	1	1	0	0	2	0	+2	CAF	2–0	X
Mexico	3	0	0	3	2	9	−7	CONCACAF	X	0–4
Montenegro	2	1	1	0	2	1	+1	UEFA	2–1	X
Morocco	1	1	0	0	1	0	+1	CAF	1–0	X
Mozambique	1	1	0	0	3	0	+3	CAF	3–0	X
Myanmar	5	3	0	2	7	4	+3	AFC	3–1	0–1
Nepal	5	5	0	0	25	0	+25	AFC	8–0	X
Netherlands	1	0	0	1	0	3	−3	UEFA	X	0–3
New Zealand	3	1	2	0	5	2	+3	OFC	3–0	X
Nicaragua	1	1	0	0	1	0	+1	CONCACAF	1–0	X
Nigeria	3	0	1	2	1	3	−2	CAF	X	1–2
Oman	13	7	4	2	26	15	+11	AFC	4–0	2–4
Pakistan	14	12	1	1	58	10	+48	AFC	9–1	1–4
Palestine	7	5	2	0	20	3	+17	AFC	7–0	X
Panama	2	2	0	0	3	1	+2	CONCACAF	2–1	X
Papua New Guinea	1	1	0	0	8	1	+7	OFC	8–1	X
Paraguay	1	0	1	0	1	1	0	CONMEBOL	X	X
Peru	1	0	0	1	1	4	−3	CONMEBOL	X	1–4
Philippines	1	1	0	0	7	1	+6	AFC	7–1	X
Poland	2	0	0	2	0	3	−3	UEFA	X	0–2
Portugal	3	0	1	2	1	6	−5	UEFA	X	0–3
Qatar	27	17	5	5	47	21	+26	AFC	6–1	0–2
Romania	2	0	2	0	2	2	0	UEFA	X	X
Russia	7	1	2	4	4	9	−5	UEFA	1–0	0–2
Saudi Arabia	14	4	6	4	19	13	+6	AFC	3–0	3–4
Scotland	1	0	1	0	1	1	0	UEFA	X	X
Senegal	2	0	2	0	2	2	0	CAF	X	X
Serbia	3	0	1	2	1	4	−3	UEFA	X	1–3
Sierra Leone	1	1	0	0	4	0	+4	CAF	4–0	X
Singapore	3	2	1	0	10	2	+8	AFC	6–0	X
Slovakia	2	1	0	1	6	6	0	UEFA	4–3	2–3
Spain	1	0	0	1	0	1	−1	UEFA	X	0–1
Sri Lanka	2	2	0	0	11	0	+11	AFC	7–0	X
Sweden	1	0	0	1	1	3	−2	UEFA	X	1–3
Syria	31	18	12	1	53	16	+37	AFC	7–1	0–1
Tajikistan	5	4	1	0	16	3	+13	AFC	6–1	X
Tanzania	1	1	0	0	2	0	+2	CAF	2–0	X
Thailand	14	11	3	0	32	5	+27	AFC	5–0	X
Togo	2	2	0	0	4	0	+4	CAF	2–0	X
Trinidad and Tobago	2	2	0	0	3	0	+3	CONCACAF	2–0	X
Tunisia	2	0	1	1	2	3	−1	CAF	X	0–1
Turkey	6	0	2	4	2	13	−11	UEFA	X	1–6
Turkmenistan	10	5	3	2	16	8	+8	AFC	5–0	0–1
Uganda	1	0	1	0	2	2	0	CAF	X	X
Ukraine	1	1	0	0	1	0	+1	UEFA	1–0	X
United Arab Emirates	21	17	3	1	31	5	+26	AFC	3–0	1–3
United States	3	1	1	1	3	3	0	CONCACAF	2–1	0–1
Uruguay	2	1	1	0	2	1	+1	CONMEBOL	1–0	X
Uzbekistan	19	10	6	3	21	11	+10	AFC	4–0	1–3
Venezuela	3	2	1	0	3	1	+2	CONMEBOL	1–0	X
Vietnam	1	1	0	0	2	0	+2	AFC	2–0	X
Wales	2	1	0	1	2	1	+1	UEFA	2–0	0–1
Yemen	3	3	0	0	11	1	+10	AFC	5–0	X
Yemen, South	3	3	0	0	12	0	+12	AFC	8–0	X
Zambia	1	1	0	0	3	2	+1	CAF	3–2	X
Total	631	362	150	119	1209	496	+713			

- FIFA considers Russia as the inheritor of the records of Soviet Union.
- FIFA considers Serbia as the inheritor of the records of SFR Yugoslavia and FR Yugoslavia.
- FIFA considers Czech Republic as the inheritor of the records of Czechoslovakia.

== FIFA World rankings ==
9 (gold) , 9 (silver) , 2 (bronze) , 5 (Fourth Place) (25/31) (1993–2023)

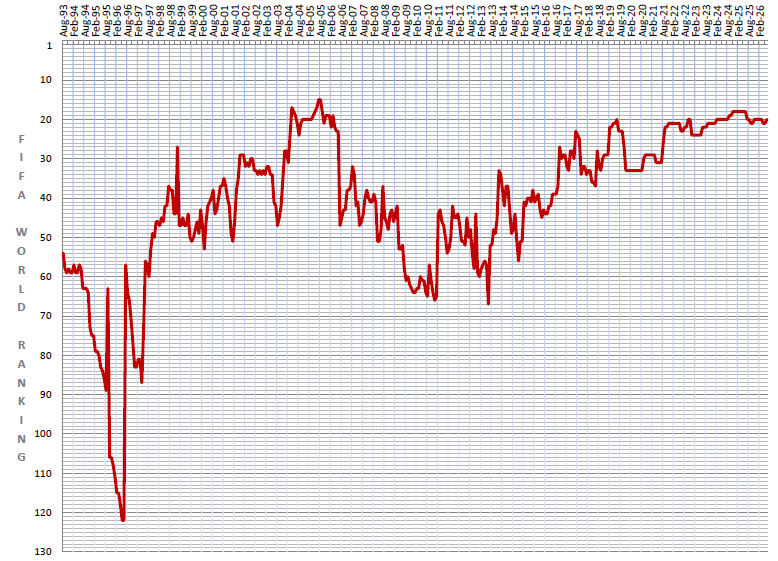
FIFA World Rankings for Iran, August 1993 – June 2026

Between December 2014 and May 2018, Iran was the highest-ranked team in Asia, which is the longest continuous period of time that a team has held that distinction.

Highest FIFA ranking
15 (July 2005)
Lowest FIFA ranking
122 (May 1996)
Best mover
+65 (July 1996)
Worst mover
–43 (October 1995)

Last update was on 01 January 2022.

Best Ranking Worst Ranking Best Mover Worst Mover

Iran's FIFA World Ranking History
Rank	Year	Games Played	Won	Drawn	Lost	Best		Worst	
Rank	Year	Games Played	Won	Drawn	Lost	Rank	Move	Rank	Move
24	2022	11	6	1	4	20	▲2	24	▼4
21	2021	11	10	1	0	21	▲5	31	▼2
29	2020	2	2	0	0	29	▲3	33	▼0
33	2019	12	7	2	3	20	▲7	33	▼6
29	2018	15	9	3	3	28	▲5	37	▼3
32	2017	11	7	3	1	23	▲7	43	▼9
29	2016	10	8	2	0	27	▲10	44	▼3
45	2015	15	10	4	1	38	▲10	51	▼4
51	2014	10	3	4	3	34	▲5	56	▼7
33	2013	9	7	1	1	33	▲15	67	▼10
59	2012	14	4	7	3	44	▲14	59	▼15
45	2011	15	12	2	1	42	▲21	65	▼4
66	2010	12	8	2	2	57	▲8	67	▼4
64	2009	21	7	8	6	42	▲2	64	▼11
43	2008	21	12	7	2	37	▲11	51	▼10
41	2007	13	8	4	1	32	▲5	47	▼8
38	2006	15	8	5	2	19	▲5	47	▼24
19	2005	11	8	1	2	15	▲2	21	▼3
20	2004	18	13	3	2	17	▲7	31	▼3
28	2003	11	6	1	4	28	▲7	47	▼7
33	2002	10	4	4	2	29	▲2	34	▼3
29	2001	20	11	4	5	29	▲8	51	▼7
37	2000	26	15	7	4	37	▲7	53	▼6
49	1999	6	2	4	0	44	▲3	51	▼20
27	1998	18	9	2	7	27	▲17	47	▼6
46	1997	22	11	7	4	46	▲17	87	▼6
83	1996	21	13	5	3	57	▲65	122	▼7
108	1995	0	0	0	0	63	▲26	108	▼43
75	1994	4	1	2	1	57	▲2	75	▼9
59	1993	15	9	3	3	54	▲7	59	▼4

== Honours ==
=== Intercontinental ===
- Afro-Asian Cup of Nations
  - Runners-up (1): 1991
- AFC–OFC Challenge Cup
  - Champions (1): 2003

=== Continental ===
- AFC Asian Cup
  - Champions (3): 1968, 1972, 1976
  - Third place (6): 1980, 1988, 1996, 2004, 2019, 2023
- Asian Games^{1}
  - Gold medal (3): 1974, 1990, 1998
  - Silver medal (2): 1951, 1966

=== Regional ===
- WAFF Championship
  - Champions (4): 2000, 2004, 2007*, 2008
  - Runners-up (1): 2010
  - Third place (1): 2002
- CAFA Nations Cup
  - Champions (1): 2023
  - Runners-up (1): 2025
- West Asian Games
  - Gold medal (1): 1997
  - Runners-up (1): 2002
  - Third place (1): 2005

=== Friendly ===
- ECO Cup
  - Winners: 1965, 1970, 1993
  - Runners-up: 1967, 1969, 1974**
- LG Cup
  - Winners: 2001, 2002 (Morocco), 2002 (Iran)
  - Third place: 2000
- Quaid-e-Azam International Tournament
  - Winners: 1982
- Iran Friendship Cup
  - Runners-up: 1969
- Cyrus International Tournament
  - Winners: 1971
- Iran International Tournament
  - Winners: 1974
- Basra International Tournament
  - Winners: 2026
- Fajr International Tournament
  - Runners-up: 1986
- Lunar New Year Cup
  - Runners-up: 2003
  - Third place: 1998
- Ciao February Cup
  - Runners-up: 1999
- Canada Cup
  - Runners-up: 1999
- Civilization Cup
  - Third place: 2001
- Tehran Cup
  - Third place: 2005
- Oman Cup
  - Third place: 2008
- Al Ain International Cup
  - Runners-up: 2025

^{**} as Malavan

=== Awards ===
- AFC Asian Cup Fair Play Award: 1996

=== Summary ===
Only official honours are included, according to FIFA statutes (competitions organized/recognized by FIFA or an affiliated confederation).

Competition	1st place, gold medalist(s)	2nd place, silver medalist(s)	3rd place, bronze medalist(s)	Total
AFC Asian Cup	3	0	6	9
Afro-Asian Cup of Nations	0	1	0	1
AFC–OFC Challenge Cup	1	0	0	1
Total	4	1	6	11

Notes

1. Competition organized by OCA, officially not recognized by FIFA.

== See also ==
- Iran national football B team
- Football Federation Islamic Republic of Iran
- Persian Gulf Pro League
- Iranian football clubs in the AFC Champions League
- Asian Club Championship and AFC Champions League Elite records and statistics
- Football in Iran
- Futsal in Iran
- Iran national futsal team
- Iran national beach soccer team
- Iran national under-23 football team
- Iran national under-20 football team
- Iran national under-17 football team
- Iran women's national football team
- Iran women's national under-20 football team
- Iran women's national under-17 football team
- Iran women's national futsal team
- Tehran XI

== Notes ==
Awards and achievements
Preceded by 1964 Israel	Asian Champions; 1968 (first title); 1972 (second title); 1976 (third title)	Succeeded by 1980 Kuwait
Preceded by Myanmar South Korea	Asian Games Champions; 1974 (first title)	Succeeded by North Korea South Korea
Preceded by South Korea	Asian Games Champions; 1990 (second title)	Succeeded by Uzbekistan
Preceded by Uzbekistan	Asian Games Champions; 1998 (third title); 2002 (fourth title)	Succeeded by Qatar
Preceded by Inaugural champions	WAFF Champions; 2000 (first title)	Succeeded by 2002 Iraq
Preceded by 2002 Iraq	WAFF Champions; 2004 (second title); 2007 (third title); 2008 (fourth title)	Succeeded by 2010 Kuwait
Preceded by Inaugural champions	CAFA Champions; 2023 (first title)	Succeeded by Uzbekistan
