= Samira Samii =

German-Iranian football agent (born 1977)

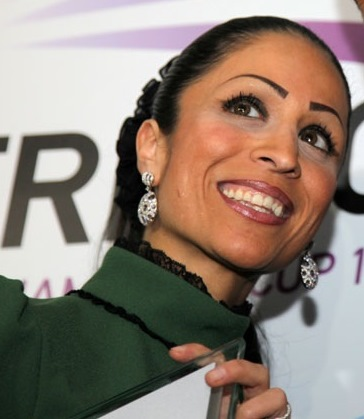
- Samira Samii, Trialog Cup 2012
- Born: 1977 (age 48–49); Tehran, Iran
- Occupations: Sports agent; Sports columnist
- Spouse: Mehdi Mahdavikia (m. 2005; div. 2006)

Samira Samii (Persian: سمیرا سمیعی; born 1977) is a sports agent and columnist for the German football magazine Rund. She is the only female agent working in the German Bundesliga.

Samii was born in Tehran and raised in France and Canada. Her father, Hossein Samii, is a noted eye surgeon and her mother a member of a Persian noble family. She moved to Munich when she was 19 to study international tourism management and later also acquired a degree in sports management in Canada. In addition to her career as a sports agent for multiple players in the German Bundesliga, she also works as an ambassador for German international Per Mertesacker's charitable foundation which focuses on helping socially disadvantaged children through sports activities. In 2012, she received the "Woman of the Year" award from the Trialog Institute, and has also served on the jury for "Miss Franken Classic" and other beauty contests.

Samii married Mehdi Mahdavikia at a ceremony in Iran in December 2005. They separated and later divorced after she learned in April 2006 that he was still married to his first wife.
