= 2001 AFC–OFC Challenge Cup =

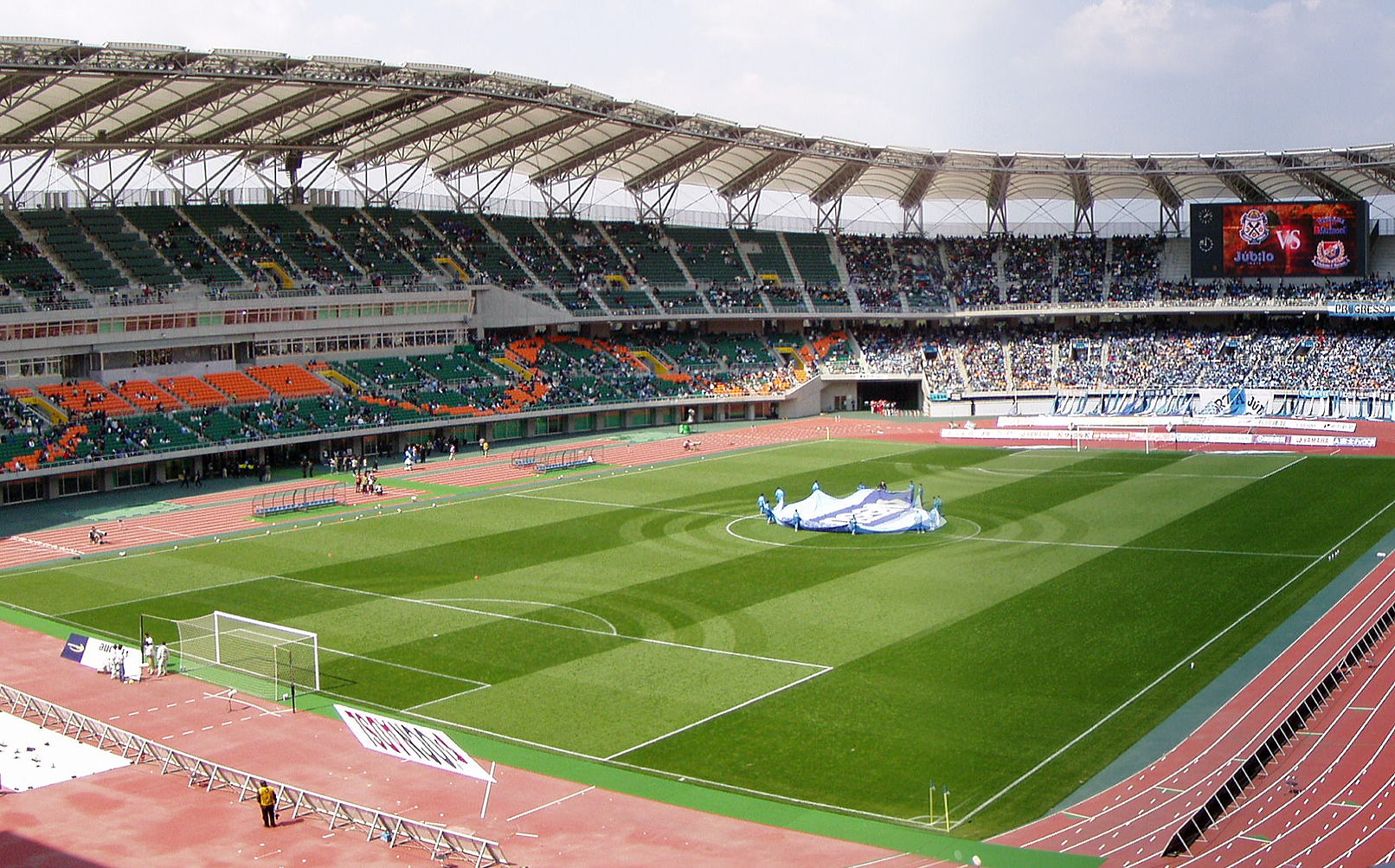
- Shizuoka Stadium hosted the match
Japan	Australia
3	0
- Date: 15 August 2001
- Venue: Shizuoka Stadium, Fukuroi, Shizuoka
- Referee: Zhang Jianjun (China)
- Attendance: 46,404

The 2001 AFC–OFC Challenge Cup was the first edition of the AFC–OFC Challenge Cup, it was contested between Japan, winners of the 2000 AFC Asian Cup, and Australia, winners of the 2000 OFC Nations Cup. The match was played in one leg on 15 August 2001 in Fukuroi, Shizuoka.

== Qualified teams ==
Country	Qualified as	Previous appearance in tournament
Japan	2000 AFC Asian Cup champions	Debut
Australia	2000 OFC Nations Cup champions	Debut

== Match details ==
15 August 2001
19:14 UTC+9

Japan	3–0	Australia
Yanagisawa 19'; Hattori 53'; Nakayama 65' (pen.)	Report

Shizuoka Stadium, Fukuroi, Shizuoka
Attendance: 46,404
Referee: Zhang Jianjun (China)

== Winners ==
2001 AFC–OFC Challenge Cup

Japan
1st title
