= 2003 AFC–OFC Challenge Cup =

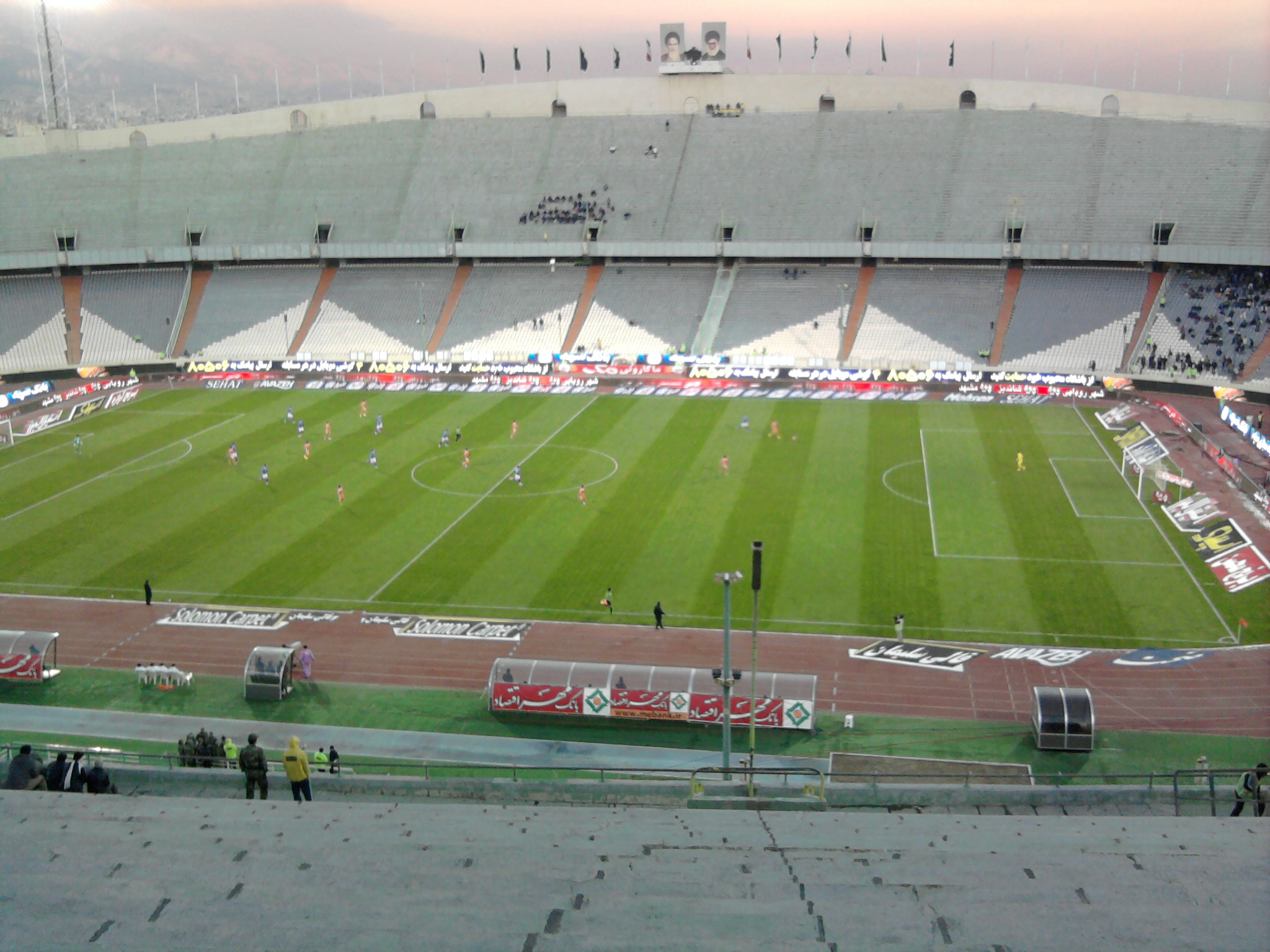
- Azadi Stadium hosted the match
Iran	New Zealand
3	0
- Date: 12 October 2003
- Venue: Azadi Stadium, Tehran
- Referee: Kousa Mohammed (Syria)
- Attendance: 50,000

The 2003 AFC–OFC Challenge Cup was the second edition of the AFC–OFC Challenge Cup, it was contested between Iran, winners of the 2002 Asian Games, and New Zealand, winners of the 2002 OFC Nations Cup. The match was originally planned as two-legged tie on 28 March in Auckland and 4 April in Tehran, but then postponed due to Iraq War. Finally, the match was played in one leg on 12 October 2003 in Tehran.

== Qualified teams ==
Country	Qualified as	Previous appearance in tournament
Iran	2002 Asian Games champions	Debut
New Zealand	2002 OFC Nations Cup champions	Debut

== Match details ==
12 October 2003
15:30 UTC+3:30

Iran	3–0	New Zealand
Karimi 24', 37'; Kaebi 67'	Report

Azadi Stadium, Tehran
Attendance: 50,000
Referee: Kousa Mohammed (Syria)

== Winners ==
2003 AFC–OFC Challenge Cup

Iran
1st title
