= AFC–OFC Challenge Cup =

Intercontinental football tournament between Asia and Oceania

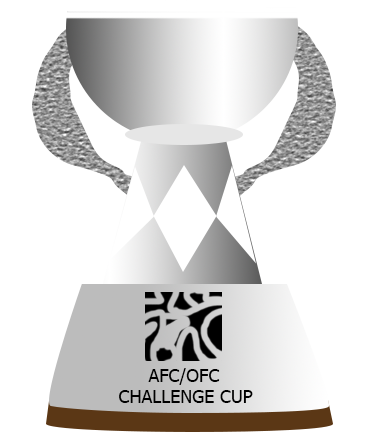
- Organiser(s): AFC; OFC
- Founded: 2001
- Abolished: 2003
- Region: Asia; Oceania
- Teams: 2
- Last champions: Iran (1st title)
- Most championships: Iran; Japan (1 title each)

The AFC–OFC Challenge Cup was a football tournament, set up as the successor of the discontinued Afro-Asian Cup of Nations. It was a biannual event, with Oceania represented by the winners of the OFC Nations Cup and Asia alternately by the winners of the AFC Asian Cup and those of the Asian Games. It was staged as a single match format.

The cup was first played with Japan beating Australia 3–0 in 2001.

== Results ==
List of AFC–OFC Challenge Cup matches
Year	Winners	Score	Runners-up	Venue	Location	Attendance
2001	Japan	3–0	Australia	Shizuoka Stadium	Fukuroi, Japan	46,404
2003	Iran	3–0	New Zealand	Azadi Stadium	Tehran, Iran	50,000

=== Results by nation ===
Results by nation
Team	Winners	Runners-up
Japan	1 (2001)	—
Iran	1 (2003)	—
Australia	—	1 (2001)
New Zealand	—	1 (2003)

=== Results by confederation ===
Results by confederation
Confederation	Winners	Runners-up
AFC	2	0
OFC	0	2

== See also ==
- Afro-Asian Cup of Nations
- Finalissima
- Panamerican Championship
