= Iran national football team results (1990–1999) =

This is a list of official football games played by Iran national football team between 1990 and 1999.

== 1990 ==
Friendly

2 February 1990

Iran	0–2	Poland
	Report	Ziober 19' (pen.), 56'

Azadi Stadium, Tehran
Attendance: 50,000
Referee: Hadi Dezfouli (Iran)

Friendly

4 February 1990

Iran	0–1	Poland
	Report	Szewczyk 60'

Azadi Stadium, Tehran
Attendance: 30,000
Referee: Mehdi Abarnirouei (Iran)

1990 Asian Games – Preliminary round

24 September 1990

Iran	3–0	Malaysia
Pious 31', 54', 78'	Report

Fengtai Stadium, Beijing
Attendance: 12,000
Referee: Wei Jihong (China)

1990 Asian Games – Preliminary round

28 September 1990

Iran	2–1	North Korea
Pious 79'; Bayani 90'	Report	Kim Yun-chol 87'

Xiannongtan Stadium, Beijing
Attendance: 17,000
Referee: Chuang Chin-fan (Chinese Taipei)

1990 Asian Games – Quarterfinal

1 October 1990
15:00

Iran	1–0	Japan
Marfavi 6'	Report

Fengtai Stadium, Beijing
Attendance: 29,000
Referee: Chen Shengcai (China)

1990 Asian Games – Semifinal

3 October 1990
20:45

South Korea	0–1 (a.e.t.)	Iran
	Report	Ghayeghran 107'

Workers' Stadium, Beijing
Attendance: 60,000
Referee: Kiichiro Tachi (Japan)

1990 Asian Games – Final

6 October 1990
20:00

Iran	0–0 (a.e.t.)	North Korea
	Report
Penalties
Ghayeghran (penalty scored); Ansarifard (penalty scored); Eftekhari (penalty scored); Namjoo-Motlagh (penalty scored)	4–1	(penalty missed) Pang Gwang-chol; (penalty missed) Yun Jong-su; (penalty scored) Tak Yong-bin

Workers' Stadium, Beijing
Attendance: 80,000
Referee: Chen Shengcai (China)

== 1991 ==
1991 Afro-Asian Cup of Nations

27 September 1991

Iran	2–1	Algeria
Marfavi 13', 78'	Report	Lazizi 23'

Azadi Stadium, Tehran
Attendance: 100,000
Referee: Nezar Watti (Syria)

1991 Afro-Asian Cup of Nations

13 October 1991

Algeria	1–0	Iran
Benhalima 78'	Report

Stade du 5 Juillet, Algiers
Attendance: 45,000
Referee: Neji Jouini (Tunisia)

== 1992 ==
1992 AFC Asian Cup qualifier

11 May 1992

Pakistan	0–7	Iran
	Report	Pious 2'; Moharrami 12'; Marfavi 18', 82'; Ghayeghran 27'; Hassanzadeh 37'; Abtahi 43'

Salt Lake Stadium, Kolkata
Attendance: 1,000
Referee: Shyam Shrestha (Nepal)

1992 AFC Asian Cup qualifier

13 May 1992

Iran	3–0	India
Moharrami 35'; Pious 40', 63'	Report

Salt Lake Stadium, Kolkata
Attendance: 20,000
Referee: Mohd Nazri Abdullah (Malaysia)

Friendly

2 October 1992

Iran	1–1	Cameroon
Moharrami	Report	Odike 75'

Azadi Stadium, Tehran
Attendance: 55,000
Referee: Ahmad Abharan (Iran)

Friendly

4 October 1992

Iran	0–0	Cameroon
	Report

Azadi Stadium, Tehran
Attendance: 50,000
Referee: Manouchehr Nazari (Iran)

Friendly

18 October 1992

Kuwait	1–1	Iran
Al-Khudhari 47'	Report	Pious 28'

Al-Sadaqua Walsalam Stadium, Kuwait City
Attendance: 12,000
Referee: Jawad Ashoor (Kuwait)

1992 AFC Asian Cup – Preliminary round

30 October 1992
17:00

North Korea	0–2	Iran
	Report	Pious 30'; Ghayeghran 80'

Bingo Stadium, Onomichi
Attendance: 8,000
Referee: Omer Al-Mehannah (Saudi Arabia)

1992 AFC Asian Cup – Preliminary round

1 November 1992
12:00

United Arab Emirates	0–0	Iran
	Report

Big Arch Stadium, Hiroshima
Attendance: 25,000
Referee: Jamal Al-Sharif (Syria)

1992 AFC Asian Cup – Preliminary round

3 November 1992
14:00

Japan	1–0	Iran
Miura 87'	Report

Big Arch Stadium, Hiroshima
Attendance: 37,000
Referee: Jamal Al-Sharif (Syria)

== 1993 ==
1993 ECO Cup – Preliminary round

6 June 1993

Iran	5–0	Pakistan
Zarincheh; Derakhshan; Bagheri; Marfavi; Namjoo-Motlagh	Report

Azadi Stadium, Tehran
Attendance: 15,000
Referee: Hossein Khoshkhan (Iran)

1993 ECO Cup – Preliminary round

8 June 1993

Iran	2–1	Turkmenistan
Marfavi; Garousi	Report	Nurmyradow 82'

Azadi Stadium, Tehran
Attendance: 15,000
Referee: Ahmad Abharan (Iran)

1993 ECO Cup – Semifinal

13 June 1993

Iran	1–0	Tajikistan
Modir-Rousta	Report

Azadi Stadium, Tehran
Attendance: 15,000
Referee: Hossein Asghari (Iran)

1993 ECO Cup – Final

14 June 1993

Iran	2–1	Turkmenistan
Modir-Rousta; Marfavi	Report	Zolotuhin 12'

Azadi Stadium, Tehran
Attendance: 15,000
Referee: Ahmad Abharan (Iran)

1994 FIFA World Cup qualifier – First round

23 June 1993

Iran	0–0	Oman
	Report

Azadi Stadium, Tehran
Attendance: 60,000
Referee: Shinichiro Obata (Japan)

1994 FIFA World Cup qualifier – First round

25 June 1993

Iran	6–0	Chinese Taipei
Estili 18'; Modir-Rousta 40', 46', 50', 75'; Daei 43'	Report

Azadi Stadium, Tehran
Attendance: 70,000
Referee: Sumanta Ghosh (India)

1994 FIFA World Cup qualifier – First round

27 June 1993

Iran	1–1	Syria
Modir-Rousta 63'	Report	Al-Helou 82'

Azadi Stadium, Tehran
Attendance: 75,000
Referee: Pierluigi Pairetto (Italy)

1994 FIFA World Cup qualifier – First round

2 July 1993

Oman	0–1	Iran
	Report	Derakhshan 35'

Abbasiyyin Stadium, Damascus
Attendance: 10,000
Referee: Mohd Nazri Abdullah (Malaysia)

1994 FIFA World Cup qualifier – First round

4 July 1993

Chinese Taipei	0–6	Iran
	Report	Derakhshan 8'; Namjoo-Motlagh 15' (pen.); Daei 19', 48'; Abtahi 22'; Estili 74'

Abbasiyyin Stadium, Damascus
Attendance: 15,000
Referee: Mohd Nazri Abdullah (Malaysia)

1994 FIFA World Cup qualifier – First round

6 July 1993

Syria	1–1	Iran
Mustafa 89' (pen.)	Report	Derakhshan 15'

Abbasiyyin Stadium, Damascus
Attendance: 40,000
Referee: Vassilios Nikakis (Greece)

1994 FIFA World Cup qualifier – Final round

16 October 1993
17:00

Iran	0–3	South Korea
	Report	Park Jung-bae 18'; Ha Seok-ju 79'; Ko Jeong-woon 81'

Khalifa International Stadium, Doha
Attendance: 10,000
Referee: Aron Schmidhuber (Germany)

1994 FIFA World Cup qualifier – Final round

18 October 1993
18:15

Japan	1–2	Iran
Nakayama 89'	Report	Hassanzadeh 45'; Daei 85'

Khalifa International Stadium, Doha
Attendance: 10,000
Referee: Fabio Baldas (Italy)

1994 FIFA World Cup qualifier – Final round

22 October 1993

Iran	1–2	Iraq
Daei 21'	Report	Radhi 20'; Kadhim 37'

Khalifa International Stadium, Doha
Attendance: 30,000
Referee: Ion Crăciunescu (Romania)

1994 FIFA World Cup qualifier – Final round

25 October 1993
16:00

Iran	2–1	North Korea
Daei 48', 66'	Report	Choi Won-nam 22'

Khalifa International Stadium, Doha
Attendance: 5,000
Referee: Fabio Baldas (Italy)

1994 FIFA World Cup qualifier – Final round

28 October 1993

Saudi Arabia	4–3	Iran
Al-Jaber 21'; Al-Mehallel 27'; Al-Mousa 47'; Idris 74'	Report	Fonounizadeh 43', 52'; Manafi 90'

Khalifa International Stadium, Doha
Attendance: 20,000
Referee: Jaap Uilenberg (Netherlands)

== 1994 ==
1994 Asian Games – Preliminary round

3 October 1994
19:00

Iran	0–0	Bahrain
	Report

Hiroshima Stadium, Hiroshima
Attendance: 5,000
Referee: Naotsugu Fuse (Japan)

1994 Asian Games – Preliminary round

5 October 1994
19:00

Iran	1–1	Turkmenistan
Own goal 86'	Report	Muhadow 60'

Bingo Stadium, Onomichi
Attendance: 910
Referee: Cha Duk-hwan (South Korea)

1994 Asian Games – Preliminary round

7 October 1994
19:00

Iran	0–1	China
	Report	Hu Zhijun 76'

Regional Park Stadium, Hiroshima
Attendance: 15,000
Referee: Abdulaziz Al-Mulla (United Arab Emirates)

1994 Asian Games – Preliminary round

9 October 1994
19:00

Iran	4–0	Yemen
Pious 11'; Shahmohammadi 18'; Moharrami 56'; Manafi 87'	Report

Athletic Stadium, Miyoshi
Attendance: 2,000
Referee: Abdulrahman Al-Zeid (Saudi Arabia)

== 1996 ==
Friendly

26 April 1996

Turkmenistan	1–1	Iran
	Report	Bagheri

Ashgabat
Attendance: 10,000

Friendly

28 April 1996

Turkmenistan	1–0	Iran
Agaýew 28'	Report

Ashgabat
Attendance: 10,000
Referee: Jalal Moradi (Iran)

Friendly

17 May 1996

Iran	2–0	Qatar
Hakimzadeh 47'; Akhtar 51'	Report

Takhti Stadium, Tabriz
Attendance: 25,000
Referee: Ahmad Abharan (Iran)

Friendly

27 May 1996

Kuwait	2–2	Iran
Al-Shelemi 31'; Ashour 85'	Report	Hakimzadeh 40'; Akhtar 59'

Al-Sadaqua Walsalam Stadium, Kuwait City
Attendance: 5,000

Friendly

30 May 1996

Kuwait	1–2	Iran
Al-Huwaidi 21'	Report	Daei 40', 70'

Al-Sadaqua Walsalam Stadium, Kuwait City
Attendance: 6,000

Friendly

1 June 1996

Qatar	0–1	Iran
	Report	Tahami

Khalifa International Stadium, Doha

1996 AFC Asian Cup qualifier

10 June 1996

Iran	8–0	Nepal
Bagheri 10' (pen.), 60'; Daei 14', 36', 84', 87'; Garousi 51'; Hakimzadeh 73'	Report

Azadi Stadium, Tehran
Attendance: 35,000
Referee: Dirar Al-Tamimi (Jordan)

1996 AFC Asian Cup qualifier

12 June 1996

Iran	7–0	Sri Lanka
Daei 30', 64', 65', 70', 77'; Bagheri 62'; Garousi 69'	Report

Azadi Stadium, Tehran
Attendance: 20,000
Referee: Selearajen Subramaniam (Malaysia)

1996 AFC Asian Cup qualifier

14 June 1996

Iran	2–0	Oman
Daei 5'; Estili 84'	Report

Azadi Stadium, Tehran
Attendance: 100,000
Referee: Dirar Al-Tamimi (Jordan)

1996 AFC Asian Cup qualifier

17 June 1996

Sri Lanka	0–4	Iran
	Report	Bagheri 17', 54', 68'; Mansourian 78'

Sultan Qaboos Sports Complex, Muscat
Attendance: 2,000
Referee: Abdul Al-Khamesy (Yemen)

1996 AFC Asian Cup qualifier

19 June 1996

Nepal	0–4	Iran
	Report	Daei 27'; Bagheri 38', 44' (pen.); Shahroudi 66'

Sultan Qaboos Sports Complex, Muscat
Attendance: 2,000
Referee: Abdulrahman Al-Zeid (Saudi Arabia)

1996 AFC Asian Cup qualifier

21 June 1996

Oman	1–2	Iran
Al-Habsi 60' (pen.)	Report	Daei 23'; Bagheri 88' (pen.)

Sultan Qaboos Sports Complex, Muscat
Attendance: 5,000
Referee: Russamee Jindamai (Thailand)

Friendly

4 October 1996

Kuwait	0–1	Iran
	Report	Yousefi 29'

Al-Kuwait Sports Club Stadium, Kuwait City
Attendance: 10,000
Referee: Hameed Al-Hindyani (Kuwait)

Friendly

13 November 1996

Lebanon	0–0	Iran
	Report

Al-Manara Stadium, Beirut
Attendance: 5,000
Referee: Talal Saleh (Lebanon)

Friendly

25 November 1996

Iran	0–1	Turkmenistan
	Report	Şumilow 28'

Azadi Stadium, Tehran
Attendance: 15,000
Referee: Jalal Moradi (Iran)

1996 AFC Asian Cup – Preliminary round

5 December 1996
19:00

Iran	1–2	Iraq
Daei 90' (pen.)	Report	Fawzi 37'; Sabbar 69'

Al-Maktoum Stadium, Dubai
Attendance: 15,000
Referee: Masayoshi Okada (Japan)

1996 AFC Asian Cup – Preliminary round

8 December 1996
19:00

Thailand	1–3	Iran
Senamuang 80'	Report	Saadavi 38'; Minavand 54'; Daei 70'

Al-Maktoum Stadium, Dubai
Attendance: 12,000
Referee: Lu Jun (China)

1996 AFC Asian Cup – Preliminary round

11 December 1996
16:45

Saudi Arabia	0–3	Iran
	Report	Daei 12'; Bagheri 37'; Azizi 47'

Al-Maktoum Stadium, Dubai
Attendance: 18,000
Referee: Masayoshi Okada (Japan)

1996 AFC Asian Cup – Quarterfinal

16 December 1996
16:45

South Korea	2–6	Iran
Kim Do-hoon 11'; Shin Tae-yong 35'	Report	Bagheri 31'; Azizi 52'; Daei 66', 76', 83', 89' (pen.)

Al-Maktoum Stadium, Dubai
Attendance: 19,000
Referee: Jamal Al-Sharif (Syria)

1996 AFC Asian Cup – Semifinal

18 December 1996
19:30

Saudi Arabia	0–0 (a.e.t.)	Iran
	Report
Penalties
Al-Temawi (penalty missed); Abdulghani (penalty scored); Zubromawi (penalty scored); Al-Muwallid (penalty missed); Al-Harbi (penalty scored); Jamil (penalty scored)	4–3	(penalty missed) Daei; (penalty scored) Peyrovani; (penalty missed) Yazdani; (penalty scored) Estili; (penalty scored) Bagheri; (penalty missed) Khakpour

Zayed Sports City Stadium, Abu Dhabi
Attendance: 35,000
Referee: Gamal Al-Ghandour (Egypt)

1996 AFC Asian Cup – 3rd place match

21 December 1996
16:45

Kuwait	1–1	Iran
Al-Huwaidi 15'	Report	Daei 40'
Penalties
Haji (penalty scored); Abdullah (penalty scored); Al-Lanqawi (penalty missed); Mubarak (penalty missed); Al-Huwaidi (penalty missed)	2–3	(penalty missed) Moharrami; (penalty scored) Estili; (penalty scored) Peyrovani; (penalty scored) Bagheri

Zayed Sports City Stadium, Abu Dhabi
Attendance: 60,000
Referee: Kim Young-joo (South Korea)

== 1997 ==
Friendly

11 April 1997

Kuwait	0–2	Iran
	Report	Shahroudi 6'; Mirza-Ostovari 26'

Kuwait City
Referee: Ali Abdulla Mandani (Kuwait)

Friendly

21 April 1997

Iran	3–0	Kenya
Azizi 8'; Mahdavikia 78'; Garousi 90'	Report

Yadegar Imam Stadium, Tabriz
Attendance: 70,000
Referee: Ahmad Abharan (Iran)

Friendly

27 April 1997

China	0–0	Iran
	Report

Workers' Stadium, Beijing
Attendance: 20,000
Referee: Lu Jun (China)

1998 FIFA World Cup qualifier – First round

2 June 1997
16:30

Maldives	0–17	Iran
	Report	Bagheri 9', 13', 16', 60', 66', 67', 83'; Estili 29', 47', 55'; Azizi 35', 36'; Shahroudi 56'; Mahdavikia 63'; Daei 75', 77'; Minavand 87'

Abbasiyyin Stadium, Damascus
Attendance: 7,000
Referee: An Bong-ki (South Korea)

1998 FIFA World Cup qualifier – First round

4 June 1997
15:30

Kyrgyzstan	0–7	Iran
	Report	Bagheri 35', 51' (pen.); Daei 57'; Majidi 68', 89'; Minavand 76'; Mousavi 82'

Abbasiyyin Stadium, Damascus
Attendance: 8,000
Referee: Shamsul Maidin (Singapore)

1998 FIFA World Cup qualifier – First round

6 June 1997
17:30

Syria	0–1	Iran
	Report	Daei 65'

Abbasiyyin Stadium, Damascus
Attendance: 33,000
Referee: Masayoshi Okada (Japan)

1998 FIFA World Cup qualifier – First round

9 June 1997
19:00

Iran	3–1	Kyrgyzstan
Azizi 3', 77'; Bagheri 52'	Report	Kutsov 16'

Azadi Stadium, Tehran
Attendance: 40,000
Referee: Pirom Un-prasert (Thailand)

1998 FIFA World Cup qualifier – First round

11 June 1997
19:00

Iran	9–0	Maldives
Mansourian 15', 44'; Bagheri 22', 39'; Daei 33', 43'; Mahdavikia 38'; Shahroudi 68'; Azizi 87'	Report

Azadi Stadium, Tehran
Attendance: 30,000
Referee: Mohamed Sanhoub (Yemen)

1998 FIFA World Cup qualifier – First round

13 June 1997
19:00

Iran	2–2	Syria
Shahroudi 10'; Mansourian 30'	Report	Boshi 11'; Bayazid 39'

Azadi Stadium, Tehran
Attendance: 100,000
Referee: Mohd Nazri Abdullah (Malaysia)

Friendly

17 August 1997
18:30

Canada	0–1	Iran
	Report	Bagheri 45'

Varsity Stadium, Toronto
Attendance: 10,000
Referee: Esfandiar Baharmast (United States)

Friendly

2 September 1997
19:00

United Arab Emirates	3–1	Iran
Bakheet 39'; Al-Doukhi 48'; Mubarak 77'	Report	Estili 70' (pen.)

Zayed Sports City Stadium, Abu Dhabi
Attendance: 10,000
Referee: Ahmad Abharan (Iran)

1998 FIFA World Cup qualifier – Second round

13 September 1997
16:15

China	2–4	Iran
Fan Zhiyi 44' (pen.); Li Ming 54'	Report	Bagheri 61' (pen.); Mahdavikia 67', 73'; Modir-Rousta 86'

Jinzhou Stadium, Dalian
Attendance: 31,000
Referee: Park Hae-yong (South Korea)

1998 FIFA World Cup qualifier – Second round

19 September 1997
18:00

Iran	1–1	Saudi Arabia
Bagheri 64'	Report	Al-Shahrani 35'

Azadi Stadium, Tehran
Attendance: 110,000
Referee: Masayoshi Okada (Japan)

1998 FIFA World Cup qualifier – Second round

26 September 1997
19:15

Kuwait	1–1	Iran
Al-Huwaidi 20'	Report	Bagheri 90'

Mohammed Al-Hamad Stadium, Kuwait City
Attendance: 25,000
Referee: Russamee Jindamai (Thailand)

1998 FIFA World Cup qualifier – Second round

3 October 1997
17:00

Iran	3–0	Qatar
Daei 31'; Bagheri 42', 56'	Report

Azadi Stadium, Tehran
Attendance: 70,000
Referee: Sidi Bekaye Magassa (Mali)

1998 FIFA World Cup qualifier – Second round

17 October 1997
17:00

Iran	4–1	China
Mansourian 2'; Modir-Rousta 44'; Bagheri 69'; Daei 73'	Report	Mao Yijun 87'

Azadi Stadium, Tehran
Attendance: 100,000
Referee: Nabil Ayad (Lebanon)

1998 FIFA World Cup qualifier – Second round

24 October 1997
20:00

Saudi Arabia	1–0	Iran
Al-Muwallid 88'	Report

King Fahd International Stadium, Riyadh
Attendance: 55,000
Referee: Arturo Brizio (Mexico)

1998 FIFA World Cup qualifier – Second round

31 October 1997
16:00

Iran	0–0	Kuwait
	Report

Azadi Stadium, Tehran
Attendance: 100,000
Referee: Pirom Un-prasert (Thailand)

1998 FIFA World Cup qualifier – Second round

7 November 1997

Qatar	2–0	Iran
Al-Enazi 38', 81'	Report

Jassim bin Hamad Stadium, Doha
Attendance: 12,000
Referee: Horacio Elizondo (Argentina)

1998 FIFA World Cup qualifier – Third round

16 November 1997
21:00

Japan	3–2 (a.e.t.)	Iran
Nakayama 39'; Jo 75'; Okano 119'	Report	Azizi 46'; Daei 58'

Larkin Stadium, Johor Bahru
Attendance: 28,000
Referee: Manuel Díaz (Spain)

1998 FIFA World Cup qualifier – Play-off AFC/OFC

22 November 1997
15:30

Iran	1–1	Australia
Azizi 40'	Report	Kewell 19'

Azadi Stadium, Tehran
Attendance: 110,000
Referee: Pierluigi Pairetto (Italy)

1998 FIFA World Cup qualifier – Play-off AFC/OFC

29 November 1997
20:30

Australia	2–2	Iran
Kewell 32'; Vidmar 48'	Report	Bagheri 76'; Azizi 80'

Cricket Ground, Melbourne
Attendance: 85,022
Referee: Sándor Puhl (Hungary)

== 1998 ==
1998 Lunar New Year Cup – Semifinal

28 January 1998

Iran	0–1	Nigeria
	Report	Garba 50'

Hong Kong Stadium, Hong Kong
Attendance: 6,000
Referee: Peter Mikkelsen (Denmark)

1998 Lunar New Year Cup – 3rd place match

31 January 1998

Iran	1–1	Chile
Mahdavikia 21'	Report	Neira 6'
Penalties
Khakpour (penalty scored); Mahdavikia (penalty scored); Falahatzadeh (penalty scored); Pashazadeh (penalty missed); Abedzadeh (penalty scored)	4–2	(penalty scored) Parraguez; (penalty scored) Barrera; (penalty missed) Sierra; (penalty missed) Olarra

Hong Kong Stadium, Hong Kong
Attendance: 31,000
Referee: Peter Mikkelsen (Denmark)

Friendly

14 April 1998
18:00

Iran	1–1	Kuwait
Mansourian 60' (pen.)	Report	Mubarak 15'

Takhti Stadium, Tabriz
Attendance: 25,000
Referee: Ahmad Abharan (Iran)

1998 LG Cup – Semifinal

20 April 1998
18:00

Iran	0–2	Hungary
	Report	Korsós 15'; Illés 57'

Azadi Stadium, Tehran
Attendance: 60,000
Referee: Mahmoud Al-Rifaee (Syria)

1998 LG Cup – 3rd place match

22 April 1998
15:30

Iran	1–0	Jamaica
Khakpour 55' (pen.)	Report

Azadi Stadium, Tehran
Attendance: 30,000
Referee: Mahmoud Al-Rifaee (Syria)

Friendly

3 June 1998

Croatia	2–0	Iran
Prosinečki 29'; Šuker 77'	Report

Stadion Kantrida, Rijeka
Attendance: 10,000
Referee: Fiorenzo Treossi (Italy)

1998 FIFA World Cup – Preliminary round

14 June 1998
17:30

Yugoslavia	1–0	Iran
Mihajlović 72'	Report

Stade Geoffroy-Guichard, Saint-Étienne
Attendance: 30,392
Referee: Alberto Tejada (Peru)

1998 FIFA World Cup – Preliminary round

21 June 1998
21:00

United States	1–2	Iran
McBride 87'	Report	Estili 40'; Mahdavikia 84'

Stade de Gerland, Lyon
Attendance: 39,100
Referee: Urs Meier (Switzerland)

1998 FIFA World Cup – Preliminary round

25 June 1998
21:00

Germany	2–0	Iran
Bierhoff 50'; Klinsmann 57'	Report

Stade de la Mosson, Montpellier
Attendance: 29,800
Referee: Epifanio González (Paraguay)

Friendly

13 October 1998
19:00

Kuwait	3–0	Iran
Laheeb 53'; Abdullah 57'; Mubarak 71'	Report

Al-Sadaqua Walsalam Stadium, Kuwait City
Attendance: 10,000
Referee: Mansour Abdulsadiq (Kuwait)

1998 Asian Games – Preliminary round

1 December 1998
15:30

Kazakhstan	0–2	Iran
	Report	Hashemian 1', 55'

Sri Nakhon Lamduan Stadium, Sisaket
Attendance: 10,086
Referee: Hani Bilal (Qatar)

1998 Asian Games – Preliminary round

5 December 1998
15:30

Iran	6–1	Laos
Mousavi 25', 33'; Mansourian 73'; Yazdani 81'; Daei 82'; Douangdala 86' (o.g.)	Report	Keophet 45'

Sri Nakhon Lamduan Stadium, Sisaket
Attendance: 5,000
Referee: Sukavit Yusabai (Thailand)

1998 Asian Games – Second round

8 December 1998
17:00

Oman	4–2	Iran
Zayid 24'; Mohammadkhani 41' (o.g.); Al-Dhabit 51'; Salim 90'	Report	Daei 20'; Hashemian 63'

Suphachalasai Stadium, Bangkok
Attendance: 2,000
Referee: Kurmanbek Ordabayev (Kazakhstan)

1998 Asian Games – Second round

10 December 1998
15:00

Tajikistan	0–5	Iran
	Report	Daei 5', 71'; Bagheri 11'; Khakpour 18'; Mousavi 49'

Suphachalasai Stadium, Bangkok
Attendance: 5,000
Referee: Nabil Ayad (Lebanon)

1998 Asian Games – Second round

12 December 1998
15:00

Iran	2–1	China
Daei 28'; Bagheri 30'	Report	Li Jinyu 10'

Suphachalasai Stadium, Bangkok
Attendance: 10,000
Referee: Saad Kamil (Kuwait)

1998 Asian Games – Quarterfinal

14 December 1998
14:00

Uzbekistan	0–4	Iran
	Report	Mousavi 29'; Daei 83', 88', 90'

Suphachalasai Stadium, Bangkok
Attendance: 2,000
Referee: Pirom Un-prasert (Thailand)

1998 Asian Games – Semifinal

16 December 1998
14:00

Iran	1–0	China
Mousavi 50'	Report

Rajamangala Stadium, Bangkok
Attendance: 40,000
Referee: Nabil Ayad (Lebanon)

1998 Asian Games – Final

19 December 1998
17:00

Iran	2–0	Kuwait
Karimi 6'; Bagheri 26'	Report

Rajamangala Stadium, Bangkok
Attendance: 50,000
Referee: Pirom Un-prasert (Thailand)

== 1999 ==
1999 Ciao February Cup – Semifinal

15 February 1999

Kuwait	1–2	Iran
Al-Huwaidi 8'	Report	Mohammadkhani 30' (pen.); Khatibi 39'

Mohammed Al-Hamad Stadium, Kuwait City
Attendance: 15,000
Referee: Gamal Al-Ghandour (Egypt)

1999 Canada Cup

2 June 1999

Ecuador	1–1	Iran
Montaño 39'	Report	Mousavi 65'

Commonwealth Stadium, Edmonton
Attendance: 5,386
Referee: Mike Seifert (Canada)

1999 Canada Cup

4 June 1999

Canada	0–1	Iran
	Report	Daei 71'

Commonwealth Stadium, Edmonton
Attendance: 8,865
Referee: Antonio Marrufo (Mexico)

1999 Canada Cup

6 June 1999

Iran	2–2	Guatemala
Hamedani 53'; Hashemian 89'	Report	Rivera 51'; García 79'

Commonwealth Stadium, Edmonton
Attendance: 8,865
Referee: Kevin Terry (United States)

1999 Kirin World Challenge

8 September 1999
16:00

Japan	1–1	Iran
Oku 10'	Report	Daei 68'

International Stadium, Yokohama
Attendance: 35,860
Referee: Mohd Nazri Abdullah (Malaysia)

Friendly

10 October 1999

Denmark	0–0	Iran
	Report

Parken Stadium, Copenhagen
Attendance: 13,131
Referee: Eric Blareau (Belgium)

== Statistics ==
=== Results by year ===
Year	Pld	W	D	L	GF	GA	GD
1990	7	4	1	2	7	4	+3
1991	2	1	0	1	2	2	0
1992	8	3	4	1	14	3	+11
1993	15	9	3	3	33	15	+18
1994	4	1	2	1	5	2	+3
1996	21	13	5	3	50	13	+37
1997	22	11	7	4	64	20	+44
1998	18	9	2	7	29	20	+9
1999	6	2	4	0	7	5	+2
Total	103	53	28	22	211	84	+127

=== Managers ===
Name	First match	Last match	Pld	W	D	L	GF	GA	GD
(Iran) Ali Parvin	2 February 1990	28 October 1993	32	17	8	7	56	24	+32
(Croatia) Stanko Poklepović	3 October 1994	9 October 1994	4	1	2	1	5	2	+3
(Iran) Mohammad Mayeli Kohan	26 April 1996	7 November 1997	40	24	10	6	109	27	+82
(Brazil) Valdeir Vieira	16 November 1997	29 October 1997	3	0	2	1	5	6	–1
(Croatia) Tomislav Ivić	28 January 1998	22 April 1998	5	1	2	2	3	5	–2
(Iran) Jalal Talebi	3 June 1998	25 June 1998	4	1	0	3	2	6	–4
(Iran) Mansour Pourheidari	13 October 1998	10 October 1999	15	9	4	2	31	14	+17
Total			103	53	28	22	211	84	+127

=== Opponents ===
Team	Pld	W	D	L	GF	GA	GD
Algeria	2	1	0	1	2	2	0
Australia	2	0	2	0	3	3	0
Bahrain	1	0	1	0	0	0	0
Cameroon	2	0	2	0	1	1	0
Canada	2	2	0	0	2	0	+2
Chile	1	0	1	0	1	1	0
China	6	4	1	1	11	5	+6
Chinese Taipei	2	2	0	0	12	0	+12
Croatia	1	0	0	1	0	2	–2
Denmark	1	0	1	0	0	0	0
Ecuador	1	0	1	0	1	1	0
Germany	1	0	0	1	0	2	–2
Guatemala	1	0	1	0	2	2	0
Hungary	1	0	0	1	0	2	–2
India	1	1	0	0	3	0	+3
Iraq	2	0	0	2	2	4	–2
Jamaica	1	1	0	0	1	0	+1
Japan	5	2	1	2	6	6	0
Kazakhstan	1	1	0	0	2	0	+2
Kenya	1	1	0	0	3	0	+3
Korea, North	4	3	1	0	6	2	+4
Korea, South	3	2	0	1	7	5	+2
Kuwait	12	5	6	1	15	11	+4
Kyrgyzstan	2	2	0	0	10	1	+9
Laos	1	1	0	0	6	1	+5
Lebanon	1	0	1	0	0	0	0
Malaysia	1	1	0	0	3	0	+3
Maldives	2	2	0	0	26	0	+26
Nepal	2	2	0	0	12	0	+12
Nigeria	1	0	0	1	0	1	–1
Oman	5	3	1	1	7	5	+2
Pakistan	2	2	0	0	12	0	+12
Poland	2	0	0	2	0	3	–3
Qatar	4	3	0	1	6	2	+4
Saudi Arabia	5	1	2	2	7	6	+1
Serbia	1	0	0	1	0	1	–1
Sri Lanka	2	2	0	0	11	0	+11
Syria	4	1	3	0	5	4	+1
Tajikistan	2	2	0	0	6	0	+6
Thailand	1	1	0	0	3	1	+2
Turkmenistan	6	2	2	2	6	6	0
United Arab Emirates	2	0	1	1	1	3	–2
United States	1	1	0	0	2	1	+1
Uzbekistan	1	1	0	0	4	0	+4
Yemen	1	1	0	0	4	0	+4
Total	103	53	28	22	211	84	+127
