= List of international goals scored by Ali Daei =

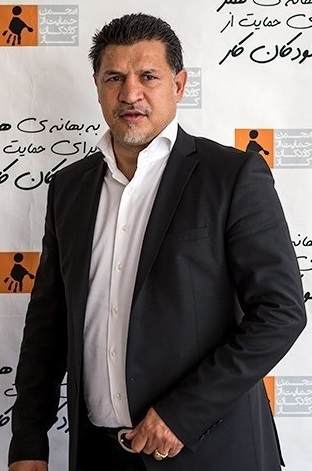
Ali Daei has scored the third most men's international goals, with 108 goals in 148 caps.

Ali Daei is an Iranian former professional association football forward who formerly held the record of the all-time men's international top goalscorer, with 108 goals in 148 appearances for the Iran national football team (also known as Team Melli) between 1993 and 2006. He was the first-ever footballer to score 100 international goals. He was originally credited with scoring 109 goals in 149 appearances for twenty years but, as of 2021, FIFA no longer recognises Iran's match against Ecuador's Olympic team on 12 January 2000 as official, therefore costing Daei one cap and one goal. His achievement is listed in Guinness World Records.

On 28 November 2003, in an Asian Cup qualifier in Tehran against Lebanon, he scored his 85th international goal, elevating him past Hungarian footballer Ferenc Puskás to take the lead of the all-time list of scorers in international matches. A revised list revealed by FIFA in March 2021, however, revealed that it was in fact Malaysia striker Mokhtar Dahari whom Daei surpassed into first place. Between 1972 and 1985, Dahari scored 89 goals for Malaysia, five more than Puskás did for Hungary between 1945 and 1956. With Daei's goal against Ecuador's Olympic team also no longer recognised, he retroactively became the all-time top international goalscorer when he scored his 90th goal for Iran against Lebanon on 17 June 2004 at the 2004 WAFF Championship.

Daei was called up to join the Iranian senior team on 6 June 1993 in the 1993 ECO Cup tournament held in Tehran, where he made his debut in a match against Pakistan. His first international goal came in a 6–0 victory over Chinese Taipei on 25 June 1993 during qualification for the 1994 FIFA World Cup. On 1 March 2006, he scored his final goal in a 3–2 victory over Costa Rica in a friendly match. His final appearance for Iran was in the 2006 FIFA World Cup against Angola on 21 June 2006 in the group stage.

Daei scored eight international hat-tricks. On 10 June 1996, he scored his first international hat-trick, in an 8–0 win over Nepal at Azadi Stadium in Tehran. On 17 November 2004, he scored the last one against Laos in a 2006 FIFA World Cup Qualification match, giving him 102 goals and making him the first male player to score 100 goals in international football.

He scored 36 goals in FIFA World Cup qualification matches, 23 goals in AFC Asian Cup qualification games and 9 goals in Asian Games, as well as 14 goals in AFC Asian Cup Finals. The remainder of his goals, 27, were scored in friendly matches. He scored eight goals against two opposition teams, the Maldives and Laos, his highest tally against any country. He scored 44 international goals at the Azadi Stadium, his most at a single ground.

== International goals ==
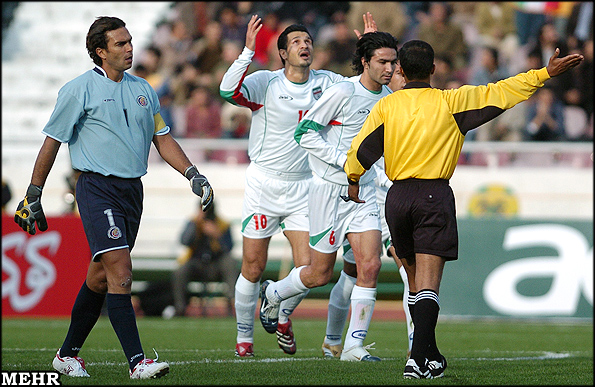
Daei (center, number 10) celebrating his last international goal, scored against Costa Rica

Scores and results list Iran's goal tally first.

Key
‡	Indicates goal was scored from a penalty kick
	Indicates Iran national football team won the match
	Indicates the match ended in draw
	Indicates Iran national football team lost the match

No.	Date	Cap	Venue	Opponent	Score	Result	Competition	Ref.
1	25 June 1993	6	Azadi Stadium, Tehran, Iran	Chinese Taipei	3–0	6–0	1994 FIFA World Cup qualification	
2	4 July 1993	9	Abbasiyyin Stadium, Damascus, Syria	Chinese Taipei	3–0	6–0	1994 FIFA World Cup qualification	
3	4 July 1993	9	Abbasiyyin Stadium, Damascus, Syria	Chinese Taipei	4–0	6–0	1994 FIFA World Cup qualification	
4	18 October 1993	13	Khalifa International Stadium, Doha, Qatar	Japan	2–0	2–1	1994 FIFA World Cup qualification	
5	22 October 1993	14	Khalifa International Stadium, Doha, Qatar	Iraq	1–1	1–2	1994 FIFA World Cup qualification	
6	25 October 1993	15	Khalifa International Stadium, Doha, Qatar	North Korea	1–1	2–1	1994 FIFA World Cup qualification	
7	25 October 1993	15	Khalifa International Stadium, Doha, Qatar	North Korea	2–1	2–1	1994 FIFA World Cup qualification	
8	30 May 1996	21	Al-Sadaqua Walsalam Stadium, Kuwait City, Kuwait	Kuwait	1–1	2–1	Friendly	
9	30 May 1996	21	Al-Sadaqua Walsalam Stadium, Kuwait City, Kuwait	Kuwait	2–1	2–1	Friendly	
10	10 June 1996	23	Azadi Stadium, Tehran, Iran	Nepal	2–0	8–0	1996 AFC Asian Cup qualification	
11	10 June 1996	23	Azadi Stadium, Tehran, Iran	Nepal	3–0	8–0	1996 AFC Asian Cup qualification	
12	10 June 1996	23	Azadi Stadium, Tehran, Iran	Nepal	7–0	8–0	1996 AFC Asian Cup qualification	
13	10 June 1996	23	Azadi Stadium, Tehran, Iran	Nepal	8–0	8–0	1996 AFC Asian Cup qualification	
14	12 June 1996	24	Azadi Stadium, Tehran, Iran	Sri Lanka	1–0	7–0	1996 AFC Asian Cup qualification	
15	12 June 1996	24	Azadi Stadium, Tehran, Iran	Sri Lanka	3–0	7–0	1996 AFC Asian Cup qualification	
16	12 June 1996	24	Azadi Stadium, Tehran, Iran	Sri Lanka	4–0	7–0	1996 AFC Asian Cup qualification	
17	12 June 1996	24	Azadi Stadium, Tehran, Iran	Sri Lanka	6–0	7–0	1996 AFC Asian Cup qualification	
18	12 June 1996	24	Azadi Stadium, Tehran, Iran	Sri Lanka	7–0	7–0	1996 AFC Asian Cup qualification	
19	14 June 1996	25	Azadi Stadium, Tehran, Iran	Oman	1–0	2–0	1996 AFC Asian Cup qualification	
20	19 June 1996	27	Sultan Qaboos Stadium, Muscat, Oman	Nepal	1–0	4–0	1996 AFC Asian Cup qualification	
21	21 June 1996	28	Sultan Qaboos Stadium, Muscat, Oman	Oman	1–0	2–1	1996 AFC Asian Cup qualification	
22	5 December 1996	30	Al Maktoum Stadium, Dubai, United Arab Emirates	Iraq	1–2‡	1–2	1996 AFC Asian Cup	
23	8 December 1996	31	Al Maktoum Stadium, Dubai, United Arab Emirates	Thailand	3–0	3–1	1996 AFC Asian Cup	
24	11 December 1996	32	Al Maktoum Stadium, Dubai, United Arab Emirates	Saudi Arabia	1–0	3–0	1996 AFC Asian Cup	
25	16 December 1996	33	Al Maktoum Stadium, Dubai, United Arab Emirates	South Korea	3–2	6–2	1996 AFC Asian Cup	
26	16 December 1996	33	Al Maktoum Stadium, Dubai, United Arab Emirates	South Korea	4–2	6–2	1996 AFC Asian Cup	
27	16 December 1996	33	Al Maktoum Stadium, Dubai, United Arab Emirates	South Korea	5–2	6–2	1996 AFC Asian Cup	
28	16 December 1996	33	Al Maktoum Stadium, Dubai, United Arab Emirates	South Korea	6–2‡	6–2	1996 AFC Asian Cup	
29	21 December 1996	35	Sheikh Zayed Stadium, Abu Dhabi, United Arab Emirates	Kuwait	1–1	1–1 (Note: Iran won 4–3 on penalty kicks.)	1996 AFC Asian Cup	
30	2 June 1997	36	Abbasiyyin Stadium, Damascus, Syria	Maldives	14–0	17–0	1998 FIFA World Cup qualification	
31	2 June 1997	36	Abbasiyyin Stadium, Damascus, Syria	Maldives	15–0	17–0	1998 FIFA World Cup qualification	
32	4 June 1997	37	Abbasiyyin Stadium, Damascus, Syria	Kyrgyzstan	3–0	7–0	1998 FIFA World Cup qualification	
33	6 June 1997	38	Abbasiyyin Stadium, Damascus, Syria	Syria	1–0	1–0	1998 FIFA World Cup qualification	
34	11 June 1997	40	Azadi Stadium, Tehran, Iran	Maldives	3–0	9–0	1998 FIFA World Cup qualification	
35	11 June 1997	40	Azadi Stadium, Tehran, Iran	Maldives	6–0	9–0	1998 FIFA World Cup qualification	
36	3 October 1997	45	Azadi Stadium, Tehran, Iran	Qatar	1–0	3–0	1998 FIFA World Cup qualification	
37	17 October 1997	46	Azadi Stadium, Tehran, Iran	China	4–0	4–1	1998 FIFA World Cup qualification	
38	16 November 1997	50	Larkin Stadium, Johor Bahru, Malaysia	Japan	2–1	2–3	1998 FIFA World Cup qualification	
39	5 December 1998	59	Sri Nakhon Lamduan Stadium, Sisaket, Thailand	Laos	5–1	6–1	1998 Asian Games	
40	5 December 1998	59	Sri Nakhon Lamduan Stadium, Sisaket, Thailand	Laos	6–1	6–1	1998 Asian Games	
41	8 December 1998	60	Supachalasai Stadium, Bangkok, Thailand	Oman	1–0	2–4	1998 Asian Games	
42	10 December 1998	61	Supachalasai Stadium, Bangkok, Thailand	Tajikistan	1–0	5–0	1998 Asian Games	
43	10 December 1998	61	Supachalasai Stadium, Bangkok, Thailand	Tajikistan	5–0	5–0	1998 Asian Games	
44	12 December 1998	62	Supachalasai Stadium, Bangkok, Thailand	China	1–1	2–1	1998 Asian Games	
45	14 December 1998	63	Supachalasai Stadium, Bangkok, Thailand	Uzbekistan	2–0	4–0	1998 Asian Games	
46	14 December 1998	63	Supachalasai Stadium, Bangkok, Thailand	Uzbekistan	3–0	4–0	1998 Asian Games	
47	14 December 1998	63	Supachalasai Stadium, Bangkok, Thailand	Uzbekistan	4–0	4–0	1998 Asian Games	
48	4 June 1999	67	Commonwealth Stadium, Edmonton, Canada	Canada	1–0	1–0	1999 Canada Cup	
49	8 September 1999	69	International Stadium Yokohama, Yokohama, Japan	Japan	1–1	1–1	Friendly	
50	9 January 2000	71	Oakland Coliseum, Oakland, United States	Mexico	1–1‡	1–2	Friendly	
—	12 January 2000	72	Memorial Coliseum, Los Angeles, United States	Ecuador	1–0	2–1	Unofficial Friendly	
51	31 March 2000	73	Al-Hamadaniah Stadium, Aleppo, Syria	Maldives	5–0	8–0	2000 AFC Asian Cup qualification	
52	31 March 2000	73	Al-Hamadaniah Stadium, Aleppo, Syria	Maldives	6–0	8–0	2000 AFC Asian Cup qualification	
53	31 March 2000	73	Al-Hamadaniah Stadium, Aleppo, Syria	Maldives	7–0	8–0	2000 AFC Asian Cup qualification	
54	2 April 2000	74	Al-Hamadaniah Stadium, Aleppo, Syria	Syria	1–0	1–0	2000 AFC Asian Cup qualification	
55	9 April 2000	76	Azadi Stadium, Tehran, Iran	Bahrain	3–0	3–0	2000 AFC Asian Cup qualification	
56	13 April 2000	78	Azadi Stadium, Tehran, Iran	Maldives	3–0‡	3–0	2000 AFC Asian Cup qualification	
57	7 June 2000	79	Azadi Stadium, Tehran, Iran	Egypt	1–1	1–1 (Note: Iran lost 7–8 on penalty kicks.)	2000 LG Cup	
58	9 June 2000	80	Azadi Stadium, Tehran, Iran	Macedonia	2–1	3–1	2000 LG Cup	
59	27 September 2000	82	Jassim bin Hamad Stadium, Doha, Qatar	Qatar	1–0	2–1	Friendly	
60	27 September 2000	82	Jassim bin Hamad Stadium, Doha, Qatar	Qatar	2–0	2–1	Friendly	
61	12 October 2000	83	Sports City Stadium, Beirut, Lebanon	Lebanon	4–0	4–0	2000 AFC Asian Cup	
62	15 October 2000	84	Sports City Stadium, Beirut, Lebanon	Thailand	1–1	1–1	2000 AFC Asian Cup	
63	18 October 2000	85	Saida Municipal Stadium, Sidon, Lebanon	Iraq	1–0	1–0	2000 AFC Asian Cup	
64	24 November 2000	87	Takhti Stadium, Tabriz, Iran	Guam	7–0‡	19–0	2002 FIFA World Cup qualification	
65	24 November 2000	87	Takhti Stadium, Tabriz, Iran	Guam	10–0	19–0	2002 FIFA World Cup qualification	
66	24 November 2000	87	Takhti Stadium, Tabriz, Iran	Guam	15–0	19–0	2002 FIFA World Cup qualification	
67	24 November 2000	87	Takhti Stadium, Tabriz, Iran	Guam	18–0	19–0	2002 FIFA World Cup qualification	
68	28 November 2000	88	Takhti Stadium, Tabriz, Iran	Tajikistan	1–0	2–0	2002 FIFA World Cup qualification	
69	19 January 2001	89	Azadi Stadium, Tehran, Iran	China	1–0	4–0	Ancient Civilization Cup	
70	8 August 2001	91	Azadi Stadium, Tehran, Iran	Oman	4–0‡	5–2	2001 LG Cup	
71	10 August 2001	92	Azadi Stadium, Tehran, Iran	Bosnia and Herzegovina	3–0	4–0	2001 LG Cup	
72	10 August 2001	92	Azadi Stadium, Tehran, Iran	Bosnia and Herzegovina	4–0	4–0	2001 LG Cup	
73	24 August 2001	94	Azadi Stadium, Tehran, Iran	Saudi Arabia	1–0‡	2–0	2002 FIFA World Cup qualification	
74	24 August 2001	94	Azadi Stadium, Tehran, Iran	Saudi Arabia	2–0	2–0	2002 FIFA World Cup qualification	
75	7 September 2001	96	Al-Shaab Stadium, Baghdad, Iraq	Iraq	2–1	2–1	2002 FIFA World Cup qualification	
76	28 September 2001	98	Prince Abdullah al-Faisal Stadium, Jeddah, Saudi Arabia	Saudi Arabia	1–1	2–2	2002 FIFA World Cup qualification	
77	21 October 2001	101	Bahrain National Stadium, Manama, Bahrain	Bahrain	1–2	1–3	2002 FIFA World Cup qualification	
78	31 October 2001	102	Al-Nahyan Stadium, Abu Dhabi, United Arab Emirates	United Arab Emirates	1–0	3–0	2002 FIFA World Cup qualification	
79	21 August 2002	107	NSC Olimpiyskiy, Kyiv, Ukraine	Ukraine	1–0	1–0	Friendly	
80	19 September 2002	108	Takhti Stadium, Tabriz, Iran	Paraguay	1–1	1–1 (Note: Iran won 4–3 on penalty kicks.)	2002 LG Cup	
81	5 September 2003	111	Azadi Stadium, Tehran, Iran	Jordan	1–1	4–1	2004 AFC Asian Cup qualification	
82	5 September 2003	111	Azadi Stadium, Tehran, Iran	Jordan	4–1	4–1	2004 AFC Asian Cup qualification	
83	19 November 2003	115	Municipal Stadium, Beirut, Lebanon	Lebanon	1–0‡	3–0	2004 AFC Asian Cup qualification	
84	28 November 2003	116	Azadi Stadium, Tehran, Iran	Lebanon	1–0	1–0	2004 AFC Asian Cup qualification	
85	2 December 2003	117	Al-Sadaqua Walsalam Stadium, Kuwait City, Kuwait	Kuwait	1–3	1–3	Friendly	
86	18 February 2004	118	Azadi Stadium, Tehran, Iran	Qatar	3–0‡	3–1	2006 FIFA World Cup qualification	
87	31 March 2004	119	Laos National Stadium, Vientiane, Laos	Laos	1–0	7–0	2006 FIFA World Cup qualification	
88	31 March 2004	119	Laos National Stadium, Vientiane, Laos	Laos	2–0‡	7–0	2006 FIFA World Cup qualification	
89	17 June 2004	121	Azadi Stadium, Tehran, Iran	Lebanon	1–0‡	4–0	2004 WAAF Championship	
90	17 June 2004	121	Azadi Stadium, Tehran, Iran	Lebanon	2–0	4–0	2004 WAAF Championship	
91	17 June 2004	121	Azadi Stadium, Tehran, Iran	Lebanon	3–0	4–0	2004 WAAF Championship	
92	21 June 2004	122	Azadi Stadium, Tehran, Iran	Syria	1–0	7–1	2004 WAAF Championship	
93	25 June 2004	124	Azadi Stadium, Tehran, Iran	Syria	2–1	4–1	2004 WAAF Championship	
94	20 July 2004	125	Chongqing Olympic Sports Center, Chongqing, China	Thailand	3–0‡	3–0	2004 AFC Asian Cup	
95	6 August 2004	130	Workers Stadium, Beijing, China	Bahrain	3–2‡	4–2	2004 AFC Asian Cup	
96	6 August 2004	130	Workers Stadium, Beijing, China	Bahrain	4–2	4–2	2004 AFC Asian Cup	
97	8 September 2004	131	Amman International Stadium, Amman, Jordan	Jordan	2–0	2–0	2006 FIFA World Cup qualification	
98	17 November 2004	132	Azadi Stadium, Tehran, Iran	Laos	1–0	7–0	2006 FIFA World Cup qualification	
99	17 November 2004	132	Azadi Stadium, Tehran, Iran	Laos	2–0	7–0	2006 FIFA World Cup qualification	
100	17 November 2004	132	Azadi Stadium, Tehran, Iran	Laos	3–0	7–0	2006 FIFA World Cup qualification	
101	17 November 2004	132	Azadi Stadium, Tehran, Iran	Laos	4–0	7–0	2006 FIFA World Cup qualification	
102	18 December 2004	133	Azadi Stadium, Tehran, Iran	Panama	1–0‡	1–0	Friendly	
103	2 February 2005	134	Azadi Stadium, Tehran, Iran	Bosnia and Herzegovina	1–1	2–1	Friendly	
104	17 August 2005	140	International Stadium Yokohama, Yokohama, Japan	Japan	1–2‡	1–2	2006 FIFA World Cup qualification	
105	24 August 2005	141	Azadi Stadium, Tehran, Iran	Libya	3–0	4–0	Friendly	
106	13 November 2005	142	Azadi Stadium, Tehran, Iran	Togo	1–0‡	2–0	2005 LG Cup	
107	22 February 2006	143	Azadi Stadium, Tehran, Iran	Chinese Taipei	4–0	4–0	2007 AFC Asian Cup qualification	
108	1 March 2006	144	Azadi Stadium, Tehran, Iran	Costa Rica	2–0	3–2	Friendly	

_{Note: Daei was previously credited with scoring against Ecuador however FIFA no longer recognise this match as official as Ecuador played their Olympic team, rather than their full 'A' international side.}

== Hat-tricks ==
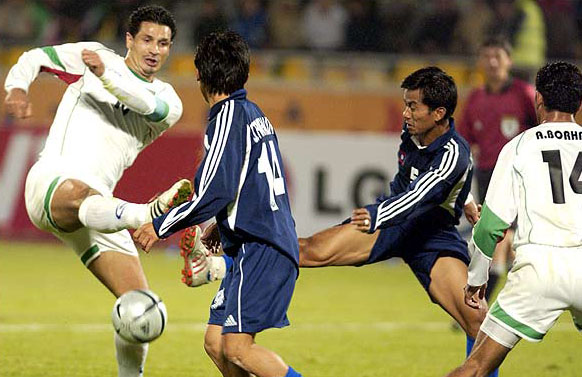
Daei's last hat-trick against Laos allowed him to become the first male player to score 100 goals in international football.

Hat-tricks table
No.	Date	Venue	Opponent	Goals	Result	Competition	Ref.
1	10 June 1996	Azadi Stadium, Tehran	Nepal	4 – (14', 36', 84', 87')	8–0	1996 AFC Asian Cup qualification	
2	12 June 1996	Azadi Stadium, Tehran	Sri Lanka	5 – (30', 64', 65', 70', 77')	7–0	1996 AFC Asian Cup qualification	
3	16 December 1996	Al Maktoum Stadium, Dubai	South Korea	4 – (66', 77', 82', 89' pen.)	6–2	1996 AFC Asian Cup	
4	14 December 1998	National Stadium, Bangkok	Uzbekistan	3 – (83', 88', 90')	4–0	1998 Asian Games	
5	31 March 2000	Al-Hamadaniah Stadium, Aleppo	Maldives	3 – (39', 61', 72')	8–0	2000 AFC Asian Cup qualification	
6	24 November 2000	Takhti Stadium, Tabriz	Guam	4 – (35' pen., 44', 52', 74')	19–0	2002 FIFA World Cup qualification	
7	17 June 2004	Azadi Stadium, Tehran	Lebanon	3 – (15' pen., 61', 88')	4–0	2004 WAAF Championship	
8	17 November 2004	Azadi Stadium, Tehran	Laos	4 – (7', 19', 27', 58')	7–0	2006 FIFA World Cup qualification	

== Statistics ==
Goals by year
Year	Apps	Goals
1993	16	7
1994	1	0
1995	0	0
1996	18	22
1997	17	9
1998	13	9
1999	5	2
2000	18	19
2001	16	10
2002	4	2
2003	9	5
2004	16	17
2005	9	4
2006	6	2
Total	148	108

Goals by competition
Competition	Goals
Friendlies	26
AFC Asian Cup qualification	23
AFC Asian Cup Finals	14
Asian Games	9
FIFA World Cup qualification	36
Total	108

Goals by confederation
Confederation	Teams	Goals
AFC	24	95
UEFA	3	5
CONCACAF	4	4
CAF	3	3
CONMEBOL	1	1
Total	36	108

Goals by opposition
Opposition	Goals
Laos	8
Maldives	8
Lebanon	6
Nepal	5
Sri Lanka	5
Bahrain	4
Chinese Taipei	4
Guam	4
Iraq	4
Japan	4
Kuwait	4
Oman	4
Qatar	4
Saudi Arabia	4
South Korea	4
Syria	4
Bosnia and Herzegovina	3
China	3
Jordan	3
Tajikistan	3
Thailand	3
Uzbekistan	3
North Korea	2
Canada	1
Costa Rica	1
Egypt	1
Kyrgyzstan	1
Libya	1
Mexico	1
Macedonia	1
Panama	1
Paraguay	1
Togo	1
Ukraine	1
United Arab Emirates	1
Total	108

== See also ==
- List of top international men's football goalscorers by country
- List of men's footballers with 100 or more international caps
- List of men's footballers with 50 or more international goals
- List of hat-tricks
