= Iran national football team results (2000–2009) =

This is a list of official football games played by Iran national football team between 2000 and 2009.

== 2000 ==
Friendly

9 January 2000
15:00

Mexico	2–1	Iran
Hernández 3'; Blanco 19'	Report	Daei 26' (pen.)

Coliseum, Oakland
Attendance: 34,289
Referee: Ricardo Valenzuela (United States)

Friendly

16 January 2000

United States	1–1	Iran
Armas 48'	Report	Mahdavikia 6'

Rose Bowl, Pasadena
Attendance: 50,181
Referee: Benito Archundia (Mexico)

Friendly

4 February 2000

Kuwait	1–1	Iran
Al-Huwaidi 13'	Report	Abolghasempour 71'

Al-Sadaqua Walsalam Stadium, Kuwait City
Attendance: 10,000
Referee: Abul Mansoor (Kuwait)

Friendly

22 March 2000

Cyprus	0–0	Iran
	Report

GSP Stadium, Nicosia
Attendance: 500

2000 AFC Asian Cup qualifier

31 March 2000
15:30

Maldives	0–8	Iran
	Report	Hasheminasab 19'; Dinmohammadi 20'; Mahdavikia 23'; Estili 33'; Daei 39', 61', 73'; Mousavi 79'

Al-Hamadaniah Stadium, Aleppo
Attendance: 7,000
Referee: Nabil Ayad (Lebanon)

2000 AFC Asian Cup qualifier

2 April 2000
17:30

Iran	1–0	Syria
Daei 58'	Report

Al-Hamadaniah Stadium, Aleppo
Attendance: 30,000
Referee: Mohd Nazri Abdullah (Malaysia)

2000 AFC Asian Cup qualifier

4 April 2000
15:30

Bahrain	1–0	Iran
Salmeen 15'	Report

Al-Hamadaniah Stadium, Aleppo
Attendance: 10,000
Referee: Nabil Ayad (Lebanon)

2000 AFC Asian Cup qualifier

9 April 2000
16:30

Iran	3–0	Bahrain
Fekri 60'; Karimi 70'; Daei 82'	Report

Azadi Stadium, Tehran
Attendance: 40,000
Referee: Toru Kamikawa (Japan)

2000 AFC Asian Cup qualifier

11 April 2000
16:30

Syria	1–1	Iran
Al-Seyed 15'	Report	Hasheminasab 40'

Azadi Stadium, Tehran
Attendance: 50,000
Referee: Kim Young-joo (South Korea)

2000 AFC Asian Cup qualifier

13 April 2000
16:30

Iran	3–0	Maldives
Abolghasempour 3'; Estili 32'; Daei 63' (pen.)	Report

Azadi Stadium, Tehran
Attendance: 35,000
Referee: Shamsul Maidin (Singapore)

2000 WAFF West Asian Championship – Preliminary round

24 May 2000
17:30

Iran	3–0	Kazakhstan
Karimi 6', 73'; Hashemian 45'	Report

King Abdullah II Stadium, Amman
Attendance: 2,000
Referee: Salem Mahmoud (Jordan)

2000 WAFF West Asian Championship – Preliminary round

26 May 2000
20:30

Palestine	1–1	Iran
Lafi 90+2'	Report	Samereh 54'

King Abdullah II Stadium, Amman
Attendance: 3,000
Referee: Talaat Najm (Lebanon)

2000 WAFF West Asian Championship – Preliminary round

28 May 2000
20:30

Iran	1–0	Syria
Karimi 56' (pen.)	Report

King Abdullah II Stadium, Amman
Attendance: 2,000
Referee: Hazem Eisa (Iraq)

2000 WAFF West Asian Championship – Semifinal

31 May 2000
20:30

Jordan	0–1	Iran
	Report	Karimi 14'

King Abdullah II Stadium, Amman
Attendance: 16,000
Referee: Abdulhameed Ebrahim (Bahrain)

2000 WAFF West Asian Championship – Final

2 June 2000
20:30

Iran	1–0	Syria
Bakhtiarizadeh 37'	Report

King Abdullah II Stadium, Amman
Attendance: 2,000

2000 LG Cup – Semifinal

7 June 2000
19:00

Iran	1–1	Egypt
Daei 58'	Report	Hassan 51'
Penalties
Daei (penalty scored); Karimi (penalty scored); Hamedani (penalty scored); Kavianpour (penalty scored); Bakhtiarizadeh (penalty scored); Yazdani (penalty missed); Rahbarifar (penalty scored); Minavand (penalty missed); Nekounam (penalty scored); Hasehemian (penalty missed)	7–8	(penalty scored) Kamouna; (penalty scored) Homos; (penalty scored) El-Said; (penalty scored) Sabry; (penalty scored) Hassan; (penalty missed) Khashaba; (penalty scored) Emam; (penalty missed) Hassan; (penalty scored) El-Saqua; (penalty scored) Farouk

Azadi Stadium, Tehran
Attendance: 60,000
Referee: Abdulrahman Al-Zeid (Saudi Arabia)

2000 LG Cup – 3rd place match

9 June 2000
17:00

Iran	3–1	Macedonia
Bagheri 3'; Daei 8'; Kavianpour 88'	Report	Hristov 5'

Azadi Stadium, Tehran
Attendance: 40,000
Referee: Abdulrahman Al-Zeid (Saudi Arabia)

Friendly

16 August 2000
18:00

Iran	2–1	Georgia
Jamshidi 3'; Majidi 30'	Report	Kavelashvili 65'

Azadi Stadium, Tehran
Attendance: 20,000
Referee: Ahmad Abharan (Iran)

Friendly

1 September 2000

Austria	5–1	Iran
Herzog 39'; Kocijan 44'; Mayrleb 47', 68'; Kühbauer 66'	Report	Majidi 7'

Ernst Happel Stadion, Vienna
Attendance: 24,000
Referee: Goran Marić (Croatia)

Friendly

27 September 2000
18:30

Qatar	1–2	Iran
Hamzah 75'	Report	Daei 17', 52'

Jassim bin Hamad Stadium, Doha
Attendance: 5,000
Referee: Sultan Al-Muzahmi (Oman)

2000 AFC Asian Cup – Preliminary round

12 October 2000
20:45

Lebanon	0–4	Iran
	Report	Bagheri 19'; Estili 75', 87'; Daei 90+1'

Sports City Stadium, Beirut
Attendance: 52,418
Referee: Lu Jun (China)

2000 AFC Asian Cup – Preliminary round

15 October 2000
17:05

Iran	1–1	Thailand
Daei 73'	Report	Piturat 12'

Sports City Stadium, Beirut
Attendance: 10,000
Referee: Saad Kamil (Kuwait)

2000 AFC Asian Cup – Preliminary round

18 October 2000
19:35

Iran	1–0	Iraq
Daei 77'	Report

Saida Municipal Stadium, Sidon
Attendance: 8,582
Referee: Omer Al-Mehannah (Saudi Arabia)

2000 AFC Asian Cup – Quarterfinal

23 October 2000
16:45

Iran	1–2 (a.e.t.)	South Korea
Bagheri 71'	Report	Kim Sang-sik 90'; Lee Dong-gook 99'

International Olympic Stadium, Tripoli
Attendance: 5,000
Referee: Ali Bujsaim (United Arab Emirates)

2002 FIFA World Cup qualifier – First round

24 November 2000
14:30

Iran	19–0	Guam
Majidi 12', 76', 79'; Bagheri 13', 24', 34', 49', 67', 77'; Karimi 18', 56', 59', 85'; Nikbakht 31'; Daei 36' (pen.), 53', 72'; Bakhtiarizadeh 42', 68'	Report

Takhti Stadium, Tabriz
Attendance: 30,000
Referee: Talaat Najm (Lebanon)

2002 FIFA World Cup qualifier – First round

28 November 2000
14:30

Iran	2–0	Tajikistan
Daei 55'; Hasheminasab 60'	Report

Takhti Stadium, Tabriz
Attendance: 35,000
Referee: Mahmoud Al-Rifaee (Syria)

== 2001 ==
2001 Civilization Cup – 3rd place match

19 January 2001
14:30

Iran	4–0	China
Daei 13'; Mahdavi 24'; Nikbakht 38'; Akbari 81'	Report

Azadi Stadium, Tehran
Attendance: 15,000
Referee: Moajib Al-Dossary (Saudi Arabia)

2001 LG Cup – Semifinal

24 April 2001

Iran	0–1	South Korea
	Report	Kim Do-hoon 6' (pen.)

International Stadium, Cairo
Attendance: 3,000
Referee: Mohamed Kamal Risha (Egypt)

2001 LG Cup – 3rd place match

26 April 2001

Iran	0–1	Canada
	Report	Kusch 25'

International Stadium, Cairo
Attendance: 10,000
Referee: Mohamed Kamal Risha (Egypt)

Friendly

22 July 2001
17:00

Bosnia and Herzegovina	2–2	Iran
Seferović 8'; Dujmović 11'	Report	Dinmohammadi 17'; Fatemi 90'

Stadion pod Borićima, Bihać
Attendance: 5,000
Referee: Darko Čeferin (Slovenia)

Friendly

1 August 2001
19:00

Qatar	2–1	Iran
Hassan 70', 90'	Report	Nikbakht 88'

Khalifa International Stadium, Doha
Attendance: 3,000
Referee: Jaafar Mahdi Al-Khabbaz (Bahrain)

2001 LG Cup – Semifinal

8 August 2001
19:45

Iran	5–2	Oman
Golmohammadi 2'; Dinmohammadi 19', 35', 85'; Daei 38' (pen.)	Report	Al-Saadi 40'; Bashir 61'

Azadi Stadium, Tehran
Attendance: 35,000
Referee: Tajaddin Fares (Syria)

2001 LG Cup – Final

10 August 2001
19:45

Iran	4–0	Bosnia and Herzegovina
Hasheminasab 6'; Karimi 72'; Daei 78', 88'	Report

Azadi Stadium, Tehran
Attendance: 80,000
Referee: Tajaddin Fares (Syria)

Friendly

15 August 2001

Slovakia	3–4	Iran
Oravec 18', 19'; Vittek 30'	Report	Karimi 7', 17', 83'; Nikbakht 43'

Tehelné pole, Bratislava
Attendance: 3,400
Referee: Drago Kos (Slovenia)

2002 FIFA World Cup qualifier – Second round

24 August 2001
17:30

Iran	2–0	Saudi Arabia
Daei 55' (pen.), 65'	Report

Azadi Stadium, Tehran
Attendance: 120,000
Referee: Simon Micallef (Australia)

2002 FIFA World Cup qualifier – Second round

1 September 2001
18:30

Thailand	0–0	Iran
	Report

Rajamangala Stadium, Bangkok
Attendance: 30,000
Referee: Ali Bujsaim (United Arab Emirates)

2002 FIFA World Cup qualifier – Second round

7 September 2001
20:00

Iraq	1–2	Iran
Mohammed 20'	Report	Karimi 29'; Daei 83'

Al-Shaab Stadium, Baghdad
Attendance: 40,000
Referee: Felipe Ramos (Mexico)

2002 FIFA World Cup qualifier – Second round

14 September 2001
17:30

Iran	0–0	Bahrain
	Report

Azadi Stadium, Tehran
Attendance: 50,000
Referee: Subkhiddin Mohd Salleh (Malaysia)

2002 FIFA World Cup qualifier – Second round

28 September 2001
20:30

Saudi Arabia	2–2	Iran
Al-Waked 20'; Al-Yami 59'	Report	Daei 42'; Dinmohammadi 83'

Prince Abdullah Al-Faisal Stadium, Jeddah
Attendance: 30,000
Referee: Carlos Eugênio Simon (Brazil)

2002 FIFA World Cup qualifier – Second round

5 October 2001
16:00

Iran	1–0	Thailand
Nikbakht 32'	Report

Azadi Stadium, Tehran
Attendance: 75,000
Referee: Tajaddin Fares (Syria)

2002 FIFA World Cup qualifier – Second round

12 October 2001
16:00

Iran	2–1	Iraq
Mahdavikia 27'; Karimi 70'	Report	Chathir 51'

Azadi Stadium, Tehran
Attendance: 100,000
Referee: Kim Young-joo (South Korea)

2002 FIFA World Cup qualifier – Second round

21 October 2001
20:30

Bahrain	3–1	Iran
Al-Marzooqi 7'; Ali 45'; Husain 90'	Report	Daei 81'

National Stadium, Riffa
Attendance: 25,000
Referee: Carlos Batres (Guatemala)

2002 FIFA World Cup qualifier – Third round

25 October 2001
17:30

Iran	1–0	United Arab Emirates
Bagheri 45'	Report

Azadi Stadium, Tehran
Attendance: 40,000
Referee: Kim Young-joo (South Korea)

2002 FIFA World Cup qualifier – Third round

31 October 2001
18:30

United Arab Emirates	0–3	Iran
	Report	Daei 7'; Bagheri 76'; Minavand 79'

Al-Nahyan Stadium, Abu Dhabi
Attendance: 18,000
Referee: Toru Kamikawa (Japan)

2002 FIFA World Cup qualifier – Play-off AFC/UEFA

10 November 2001
18:00

Republic of Ireland	2–0	Iran
Harte 44' (pen.); Keane 50'	Report

Lansdowne Road, Dublin
Attendance: 36,538
Referee: Antônio Pereira (Brazil)

2002 FIFA World Cup qualifier – Play-off AFC/UEFA

15 November 2001
17:30

Iran	1–0	Republic of Ireland
Golmohammadi 90'	Report

Azadi Stadium, Tehran
Attendance: 100,000
Referee: William Mattus (Costa Rica)

== 2002 ==
Friendly

6 February 2002

Iran	2–3	Slovakia
Karimi 19', 80' (pen.)	Report	Reiter 5', 25'; Mintál 67'

Azadi Stadium, Tehran
Attendance: 15,000
Referee: Jalal Moradi (Iran)

2002 LG Cup – Semifinal

1 March 2002

Iran	1–0	Venezuela
Khaziravi 12'	Report

Stade Mohammed V, Casablanca
Attendance: 500
Referee: Khalil Rouissi (Morocco)

Friendly

30 May 2002

Kuwait	1–3	Iran
Abdullah 35' (pen.)	Report	Navazi 22'; Rezaei 62'; Majidi 90+2'

Sabah Al-Salem Stadium, Kuwait City
Attendance: 3,000
Referee: Abdulrahman Abdulkhaliq (Bahrain)

Friendly

10 August 2002
18:00

Iran	1–1	Azerbaijan
Karimi 33' (pen.)	Report	Ismayilov 16'

Takhti Stadium, Tabriz
Attendance: 25,000
Referee: Rahim Rahimi (Iran)

Friendly

21 August 2002

Ukraine	0–1	Iran
	Report	Daei 58'

Olympic Stadium, Kyiv
Attendance: 18,000
Referee: Asim Khudiev (Azerbaijan)

2002 WAFF West Asian Championship – Preliminary round

30 August 2002
17:00

Iran	0–1	Jordan
	Report	Shelbaieh 11'

Abbasiyyin Stadium, Damascus
Attendance: 1,000
Referee: Abdulrahman Al-Zeid (Saudi Arabia)

2002 WAFF West Asian Championship – Preliminary round

3 September 2002
17:00

Iran	2–0	Lebanon
Nikbakht 22'; Karimi 90'	Report

Abbasiyyin Stadium, Damascus
Attendance: 2,000
Referee: Khader Haj Khader (Syria)

2002 WAFF West Asian Championship – Semifinal

5 September 2002
17:00

Iraq	0–0 (a.e.t.)	Iran
	Report
Penalties
Abdul-Jabar (penalty scored); Abu Al-Hail (penalty scored); Abdul-Jabar (penalty scored); Mohammed (penalty scored); Kadhim (penalty missed); Akram (penalty scored); Abbas (penalty scored)	6–5	(penalty scored) Nekounam; (penalty scored) Bakhtiarizadeh; (penalty scored) Navidkia; (penalty scored) Nosrati; (penalty missed) Nikbakht; (penalty scored) Bayatinia; (penalty missed) Azizzadeh

Abbasiyyin Stadium, Damascus
Attendance: 2,000
Referee: Abdulrahman Al-Zeid (Saudi Arabia)

2002 WAFF West Asian Championship – 3rd place match

7 September 2002
17:00

Syria	2–2	Iran
Sari 15', 89'	Report	Kameli 58'; Nikbakht 88'
Penalties
Mustafa (penalty scored); Ibrahim (penalty scored); Jabban (penalty missed)	2–4	(penalty scored) Nekounam; (penalty scored) Bakhtiarizadeh; (penalty scored) Navidkia; (penalty scored) Kazemian

Abbasiyyin Stadium, Damascus
Attendance: 10,000
Referee: Ibrahim Abu-Ayash (Palestine)

2002 LG Cup – Final

19 September 2002
19:30

Iran	1–1	Paraguay
Daei 41'	Report	Bareiro 35'
Penalties
	4–3

Takhti Stadium, Tabriz
Attendance: 25,000
Referee: Saad Kamil (Kuwait)

== 2003 ==
2003 Lunar New Year Cup – Final

4 February 2003

Uruguay	1–1 (a.e.t.)	Iran
Estoyanoff 84'	Report	Samereh 28'
Penalties
Rodríguez (penalty scored); Estoyanoff (penalty scored); Lima (penalty scored); Silva (penalty scored)	4–2	(penalty missed) Nekounam; (penalty scored) Akbari; (penalty missed) Nosrati; (penalty scored) Mobali

Hong Kong Stadium, Hong Kong
Attendance: 17,877
Referee: Fong Yau Fat (Hong Kong)

2003 LG Cup – Semifinal

13 August 2003
19:00

Iran	0–1	Iraq
	Report	Swadi 52'

Azadi Stadium, Tehran
Attendance: 15,000
Referee: Saad Kamil (Kuwait)

Friendly

20 August 2003

Belarus	2–1	Iran
Romaschenko 9' (pen.); Shtanyuk 41'	Report	Nouri 84'

Dinamo Stadium, Minsk
Attendance: 10,000
Referee: Nikolai Ivanov (Russia)

2004 AFC Asian Cup qualifier – Final round

5 September 2003
17:30

Iran	4–1	Jordan
Daei 45+2', 90'; Nikbakht 75'; Mobali 82'	Report	Salim 3'

Azadi Stadium, Tehran
Attendance: 57,000
Referee: Abdulhameed Ebrahim (Bahrain)

2004 AFC Asian Cup qualifier – Final round

26 September 2003
19:00

Jordan	3–2	Iran
Salim 40'; Shelbaieh 45'; Al-Shagran 80'	Report	Golmohammadi 5'; Majidi 59'

Al-Hassan Stadium, Amman
Attendance: 25,000
Referee: Qassim Shaaban (Kuwait)

2004 AFC–OFC Challenge Cup

12 October 2003

Iran	3–0	New Zealand
Karimi 24', 37'; Kaebi 67'	Report

Azadi Stadium, Tehran
Attendance: 50,000
Referee: Mohammad Kousa (Syria)

2004 AFC Asian Cup qualifier – Final round

27 October 2003
15:00

North Korea	1–3	Iran
Myong Song-chol 65'	Report	Karimi 49', 79'; Navidkia 87'

Kim Il-sung Stadium, Pyongyang
Attendance: 30,000
Referee: Qassim Shaaban (Kuwait)

2004 AFC Asian Cup qualifier – Final round

12 November 2003
17:30

Iran	3–0 Awarded	North Korea
Daei 52' (pen.)

Azadi Stadium, Tehran
Attendance: 40,000
Referee: Khader Haj Khader (Syria)

* The match was abandoned after 61 minutes with Iran leading 1–0 after North Korea walked off the pitch due to firecrackers thrown from the crowd; despite the instructions of the referee, North Korea refused to return to the pitch. The match was awarded 3–0 to Iran.

2004 AFC Asian Cup qualifier – Final round

19 November 2003
20:30

Lebanon	0–3	Iran
	Report	Daei 40' (pen.); Golmohammadi 61'; Nikbakht 80'

Municipal Stadium, Beirut
Attendance: 5,000
Referee: Mohammed Al-Marzouqi (United Arab Emirates)

2004 AFC Asian Cup qualifier – Final round

28 November 2003
17:30

Iran	1–0	Lebanon
Daei 22'	Report

Azadi Stadium, Tehran
Attendance: 20,000
Referee: Mongkol Rungklay (Thailand)

Friendly

2 December 2003

Kuwait	3–1	Iran
Abdullah 27' (pen.), 34'; Ali 64'	Report	Daei 77'

Al-Sadaqua Walsalam Stadium, Kuwait City
Attendance: 5,000
Referee: Abdulla Al-Qahtani (Qatar)

== 2004 ==
2006 FIFA World Cup qualifier – Second round

18 February 2004
19:00

Iran	3–1	Qatar
Nikbakht 8'; Mahdavikia 44'; Daei 62' (pen.)	Report	Hamzah 70' (pen.)

Azadi Stadium, Tehran
Attendance: 0
Referee: Khader Haj Khader (Syria)

2006 FIFA World Cup qualifier – Second round

31 March 2004
17:00

Laos	0–7	Iran
	Report	Daei 9', 17' (pen.); Enayati 32', 36'; Khouphachansy 54' (o.g.); Taghipour 68', 83'

National Stadium, Vientiane
Attendance: 7,000
Referee: Yang Mu-sheng (Chinese Taipei)

2006 FIFA World Cup qualifier – Second round

9 June 2004
18:30

Iran	0–1	Jordan
	Report	Al-Shboul 83'

Azadi Stadium, Tehran
Attendance: 35,000
Referee: Toru Kamikawa (Japan)

2004 WAFF West Asian Championship – Preliminary round

17 June 2004
18:15

Iran	4–0	Lebanon
Daei 17' (pen.), 62', 88'; Nekounam 80'	Report

Azadi Stadium, Tehran
Attendance: 20,000
Referee: Hazim Hussein (Iraq)

2004 WAFF West Asian Championship – Preliminary round

21 June 2004
18:15

Iran	7–1	Syria
Daei 29'; Nikbakht 30'; Nosrati 45+3'; Borhani 55', 85'; Karimi 86'; Majidi 89' (pen.)	Report	Al-Sayed 82'

Azadi Stadium, Tehran
Attendance: 20,000
Referee: (Jordan)

2004 WAFF West Asian Championship – Semifinal

23 June 2004
18:15

Iran	2–1	Iraq
Nekounam 4'; Borhani 54'	Report	Mnajed 35'

Azadi Stadium, Tehran
Attendance: 15,000
Referee: Qassim Shaaban (Kuwait)

2004 WAFF West Asian Championship – Final

25 June 2004
19:15

Iran	4–1	Syria
Karimi 34'; Daei 59'; Borhani 69'; Nekounam 75'	Report	Rafe 3'

Azadi Stadium, Tehran
Attendance: 20,000
Referee: Qassim Shaaban (Kuwait)

2004 AFC Asian Cup – Preliminary round

20 July 2004
20:30

Iran	3–0	Thailand
Enayati 71'; Nekounam 80'; Daei 86' (pen.)	Report

Olympic Sports Center, Chongqing
Attendance: 37,000
Referee: Mohammad Kousa (Syria)

2004 AFC Asian Cup – Preliminary round

24 July 2004
18:00

Oman	2–2	Iran
Al-Hosni 31', 40'	Report	Karimi 61'; Nosrati 90+4'

Olympic Sports Center, Chongqing
Attendance: 35,000
Referee: Abdulrahman Delawar (Bahrain)

2004 AFC Asian Cup – Preliminary round

28 July 2004
18:15

Japan	0–0	Iran
	Report

Olympic Sports Center, Chongqing
Attendance: 52,000
Referee: Mark Shield (Australia)

2004 AFC Asian Cup – Quarterfinal

31 July 2004
21:00

South Korea	3–4	Iran
Seol Ki-hyeon 16'; Lee Dong-gook 25'; Kim Nam-il 68'	Report	Karimi 10', 20', 77'; Park Jin-sub 51' (o.g.)

Shandong Provincial Stadium, Jinan
Attendance: 20,000
Referee: Saad Kamil (Kuwait)

2004 AFC Asian Cup – Semifinal

3 August 2004
21:00

China	1–1 (a.e.t.)	Iran
Shao Jiayi 18'	Report	Alavi 38'
Penalties
Zheng Zhi (penalty scored); Zhao Junzhe (penalty missed); Li Xiaopeng (penalty scored); Sun Xiang (penalty scored); Shao Jiayi (penalty scored)	4–3	(penalty scored) Daei; (penalty scored) Mahdavikia; (penalty scored) Nekounam; (penalty missed) Mobali; (penalty missed) Golmohammadi

Workers' Stadium, Beijing
Attendance: 55,000
Referee: Talaat Najm (Lebanon)

2004 AFC Asian Cup – 3rd place match

6 August 2004
20:00

Iran	4–2	Bahrain
Nekounam 9'; Karimi 52'; Daei 80' (pen.), 90'	Report	Yousef 48'; Farhan 57'

Workers' Stadium, Beijing
Attendance: 10,000
Referee: Fareed Al-Marzouqi (United Arab Emirates)

2006 FIFA World Cup qualifier – Second round

8 September 2004
20:00

Jordan	0–2	Iran
	Report	Nikbakht 80'; Daei 90+1'

International Stadium, Amman
Attendance: 20,000
Referee: Lu Jun (China)

Friendly

9 October 2004
19:30

Iran	0–2	Germany
	Report	Ernst 5'; Brdarić 53'

Azadi Stadium, Tehran
Attendance: 110,000
Referee: Saad Kamil (Kuwait)

2006 FIFA World Cup qualifier – Second round

13 October 2004
19:30

Qatar	2–3	Iran
Mohammed 18'; Golmohammadi 75' (o.g.)	Report	Hashemian 9', 89'; Borhani 78'

Thani bin Jassim Stadium, Al-Rayyan
Attendance: 8,000
Referee: Kwon Jong-chul (South Korea)

2006 FIFA World Cup qualifier – Second round

17 November 2004
19:30

Iran	7–0	Laos
Daei 8', 20', 28', 58'; Nekounam 63', 72'; Borhani 69'	Report

Azadi Stadium, Tehran
Attendance: 30,000
Referee: Mamed Mamedow (Turkmenistan)

Friendly

18 December 2004
16:30

Iran	1–0	Panama
Daei 38' (pen.)	Report

Azadi Stadium, Tehran
Attendance: 8,000
Referee: Fereydoun Esfahanian (Iran)

== 2005 ==
Friendly

2 February 2005
16:00

Iran	2–1	Bosnia and Herzegovina
Daei 39'; Borhani 73'	Report	Bolić 18'

Azadi Stadium, Tehran
Attendance: 10,000
Referee: Masoud Moradi (Iran)

2006 FIFA World Cup qualifier – Third round

9 February 2005
18:35

Bahrain	0–0	Iran
	Report

National Stadium, Riffa
Attendance: 25,000
Referee: Subkhiddin Mohd Salleh (Malaysia)

2006 FIFA World Cup qualifier – Third round

25 March 2005
18:05

Iran	2–1	Japan
Hashemian 25', 74'	Report	Fukunishi 65'

Azadi Stadium, Tehran
Attendance: 110,000
Referee: Shamsul Maidin (Singapore)

2006 FIFA World Cup qualifier – Third round

30 March 2005
15:35

North Korea	0–2	Iran
	Report	Mahdavikia 32'; Nekounam 79'

Kim Il-sung Stadium, Pyongyang
Attendance: 55,000
Referee: Mohammad Kousa (Syria)

Friendly

29 May 2005

Iran	2–1	Azerbaijan
Zandi 9'; Nekounam 35'	Report	Gurbanov 68'

Azadi Stadium, Tehran
Attendance: 25,000
Referee: Saad Kamil (Kuwait)

2006 FIFA World Cup qualifier – Third round

3 June 2005
19:05

Iran	1–0	North Korea
Rezaei 45'	Report

Azadi Stadium, Tehran
Attendance: 35,000
Referee: Khalil Al-Ghamdi (Saudi Arabia)

2006 FIFA World Cup qualifier – Third round

8 June 2005
19:05

Iran	1–0	Bahrain
Nosrati 47'	Report

Azadi Stadium, Tehran
Attendance: 80,000
Referee: Kwon Jong-chul (South Korea)

2006 FIFA World Cup qualifier – Third round

17 August 2005
19:30

Japan	2–1	Iran
Kaji 28'; Oguro 76'	Report	Daei 79' (pen.)

International Stadium, Yokohama
Attendance: 66,098
Referee: Qassim Shaaban (Kuwait)

Friendly

24 August 2005

Iran	4–0	Libya
Alavi 7'; Nekounam 41', 90+2'; Daei 56'	Report

Azadi Stadium, Tehran
Attendance: 15,000
Referee: Abdulrahman Delawar (Bahrain)

Friendly

12 October 2005
20:00

South Korea	2–0	Iran
Cho Won-hee 1'; Kim Jin-kyu 90'	Report

World Cup Stadium, Seoul
Attendance: 61,457
Referee: Khalil Al-Ghamdi (Saudi Arabia)

2005 Tehran Cup – 3rd place match

13 November 2005

Iran	2–0	Togo
Daei 11' (pen.); Hashemian 59' (pen.)	Report

Azadi Stadium, Tehran
Attendance: 12,000
Referee: Abdulrahman Delawar (Bahrain)

== 2006 ==
2007 AFC Asian Cup qualifier

22 February 2006
15:30

Iran	4–0	Chinese Taipei
Teymourian 35'; Madanchi 47', 60'; Daei 82'	Report

Azadi Stadium, Tehran
Attendance: 5,000
Referee: Ala Abdul-Kadir (Iraq)

Friendly

1 March 2006
16:00

Iran	3–2	Costa Rica
Karimi 10'; Daei 16'; Hashemian 34'	Report	Hernández 44'; Fonseca 60'

Azadi Stadium, Tehran
Attendance: 30,000
Referee: Fareed Al-Marzouqi (United Arab Emirates)

Friendly

28 May 2006
18:00

Croatia	2–2	Iran
Pršo 31'; Babić 90+7' (pen.)	Report	Karimi 21'; Borhani 82'

Stadion Gradski vrt, Osijek
Attendance: 20,000
Referee: Željko Širić (Croatia)

Friendly

31 May 2006
18:00

Iran	5–2	Bosnia and Herzegovina
Madanchi 25'; Rezaei 45'; Hashemian 45+1'; Enayati 88'; Khatibi 90'	Report	Misimović 5'; Barbarez 17'

Azadi Stadium, Tehran
Attendance: 40,000
Referee: Subkhiddin Mohd Salleh (Malaysia)

2006 FIFA World Cup – Preliminary round

11 June 2006
18:00

Mexico	3–1	Iran
Bravo 28', 76'; Zinha 79'	Report	Golmohammadi 36'

Frankenstadion, Nuremberg
Attendance: 41,000
Referee: Roberto Rosetti (Italy)

2006 FIFA World Cup – Preliminary round

17 June 2006
15:00

Portugal	2–0	Iran
Deco 63'; Ronaldo 80' (pen.)	Report

Commerzbank-Arena, Frankfurt
Attendance: 48,000
Referee: Éric Poulat (France)

2006 FIFA World Cup – Preliminary round

21 June 2006
16:00

Iran	1–1	Angola
Bakhtiarizadeh 75'	Report	Flávio 60'

Zentralstadion, Leipzig
Attendance: 38,000
Referee: Mark Shield (Australia)

Friendly

8 August 2006
18:00

Iran	1–0	United Arab Emirates
Enayati 5'	Report

Azadi Stadium, Tehran
Attendance: 4,000
Referee: Mahmoud Rafiei (Iran)

2007 AFC Asian Cup qualifier

16 August 2006
18:00

Iran	1–1	Syria
Nekounam 71'	Report	Chaabo 88'

Azadi Stadium, Tehran
Attendance: 40,000
Referee: Ravshan Irmatov (Uzbekistan)

2007 AFC Asian Cup qualifier

2 September 2006
20:00

South Korea	1–1	Iran
Seol Ki-hyeon 45'	Report	Hashemian 90+2'

World Cup Stadium, Seoul
Attendance: 63,113
Referee: Matthew Breeze (Australia)

2007 AFC Asian Cup qualifier

6 September 2006
19:00

Syria	0–2	Iran
	Report	Nosrati 27'; Nekounam 56'

Abbasiyyin Stadium, Damascus
Attendance: 10,000
Referee: Kazuhiko Matsumura (Japan)

Friendly

4 October 2006
22:00

Iran	2–0	Iraq
Rezaei 25'; Rajabzadeh 70'	Report

International Stadium, Amman
Attendance: 500
Referee: Abdelrazzaq Ismail (Jordan)

Friendly

6 October 2006
22:00

Jordan	0–0	Iran
	Report

International Stadium, Amman
Attendance: 2,000
Referee: Abdullah Al-Balooshi (Qatar)

2007 AFC Asian Cup qualifier

11 October 2006
18:00

Chinese Taipei	0–2	Iran
	Report	Karimi 10', 56'

Municipal Stadium, Taipei
Attendance: 2,000
Referee: Tayeb Shamsuzzaman (Bangladesh)

2007 AFC Asian Cup qualifier

15 October 2006
15:30

Iran	2–0	South Korea
Enayati 48'; Badamaki 90+1'	Report

Azadi Stadium, Tehran
Attendance: 30,000
Referee: Abdulhameed Ebrahim (Bahrain)

== 2007 ==
Friendly

12 January 2007
18:30

United Arab Emirates	0–2	Iran
	Report	Khatibi 45' (pen.); Sadeghi 90+2'

Al-Nahyan Stadium, Abu Dhabi
Attendance: 9,000
Referee: Mohammed Omar (United Arab Emirates)

Friendly

7 February 2007
16:00

Iran	2–2	Belarus
Khatibi 6'; Rajabzadeh 88'	Report	Hleb 53', 59'

Azadi Stadium, Tehran
Attendance: 15,000
Referee: Saad Kamil (Kuwait)

Friendly

24 March 2007

Qatar	0–1	Iran
	Report	Nikbakht 7'

Thani bin Jassim Stadium, Al-Rayyan
Attendance: 5,000
Referee: Jaafar Mahdi Al-Khabbaz (Bahrain)

Friendly

2 June 2007
20:00

Mexico	4–0	Iran
Borgetti 2'; Lozano 27'; Fonseca 80'; Torrado 85'	Report

Estadio Alfonso Lastras, San Luis Potosí
Attendance: 30,000
Referee: Roberto Silvera (Uruguay)

2007 WAFF West Asian Championship – Preliminary round

16 June 2007
17:00

Iran	0–0	Iraq
	Report

International Stadium, Amman
Attendance: 5,000
Referee: Mahmood Abbas (Syria)

* FIFA recognized this match as a full international despite the Iranian side being Iran B.

2007 WAFF West Asian Championship – Preliminary round

20 June 2007
17:00

Iran	2–0	Palestine
Meydavoudi 56'; Rajabzadeh 86'	Report

International Stadium, Amman
Attendance: 2,000
Referee: Mohammad Abu-Loum (Jordan)

* FIFA recognized this match as a full international despite the Iranian side being Iran B.

2007 WAFF West Asian Championship – Semifinal

22 June 2007
20:30

Jordan	0–1	Iran
	Report	Rajabzadeh 32'

International Stadium, Amman
Attendance: 5,000
Referee: Won Lon-soon (South Korea)

* FIFA recognized this match as a full international despite the Iranian side being Iran B.

2007 WAFF West Asian Championship – Final

24 June 2007
19:30

Iran	2–1	Iraq
Badamaki 9'; Beikzadeh 21'	Report	Sadir 86' (pen.)

International Stadium, Amman
Attendance: 8,000
Referee: Radwan Ghandour (Lebanon)

* FIFA recognized this match as a full international despite the Iranian side being Iran B.

Friendly

2 July 2007
19:00

Iran	8–1	Jamaica
Nekounam 1', 18'; Madanchi 3', 49'; Hashemian 38'; Khatibi 82', 89'; Enayati 90+4'	Report	Taylor 84'

Azadi Stadium, Tehran
Attendance: 15,000
Referee: Hedayat Mombini (Iran)

2007 AFC Asian Cup – Preliminary round

11 July 2007
18:20

Iran	2–1	Uzbekistan
Hosseini 55'; Kazemian 78'	Report	Rezaei 16' (o.g.)

Bukit Jalil National Stadium, Kuala Lumpur
Attendance: 1,863
Referee: Saad Kamil (Kuwait)

2007 AFC Asian Cup – Preliminary round

15 July 2007
18:20

China	2–2	Iran
Shao Jiayi 6'; Mao Jianqing 33'	Report	Zandi 45'; Nekounam 73'

Bukit Jalil National Stadium, Kuala Lumpur
Attendance: 5,938
Referee: Khalil Al-Ghamdi (Saudi Arabia)

2007 AFC Asian Cup – Preliminary round

18 July 2007
20:35

Malaysia	0–2	Iran
	Report	Nekounam 29' (pen.); Teymourian 77'

Bukit Jalil National Stadium, Kuala Lumpur
Attendance: 4,520
Referee: Muhsen Basma (Syria)

2007 AFC Asian Cup – Quarterfinal

22 July 2007
18:20

Iran	0–0 (a.e.t.)	South Korea
	Report
Penalties
Zandi (penalty scored); Mahdavikia (penalty missed); Enayati (penalty scored); Khatibi (penalty missed)	2–4	(penalty scored) Lee Chun-soo; (penalty scored) Kim Sang-sik; (penalty missed) Kim Do-heon; (penalty scored) Cho Jae-jin; (penalty scored) Kim Jung-woo

Bukit Jalil National Stadium, Kuala Lumpur
Attendance: 8,629
Referee: Ali Al-Badwawi (United Arab Emirates)

== 2008 ==
Friendly

10 January 2008
18:30

Qatar	0–0	Iran
	Report

Jassim bin Hamad Stadium, Doha
Attendance: 2,000
Referee: Jaafar Alawi (Bahrain)

Friendly

30 January 2008
15:00

Iran	0–0	Costa Rica
	Report

Azadi Stadium, Tehran
Attendance: 0
Referee: Fareed Al-Marzouqi (United Arab Emirates)

2010 FIFA World Cup qualifier – Third round

6 February 2008
15:00

Iran	0–0	Syria
	Report

Azadi Stadium, Tehran
Attendance: 45,000
Referee: Malik Abdul Bashir (Singapore)

Friendly

21 March 2008
19:15

Bahrain	1–0	Iran
Husain 65'	Report

National Stadium, Riffa
Attendance: 3,000
Referee: Khalil Al-Ghamdi (Saudi Arabia)

2010 FIFA World Cup qualifier – Third round

26 March 2008
19:45

Kuwait	2–2	Iran
Ajab 39'; Al-Rashidi 82'	Report	Nikbakht 2'; Hosseini 5'

Al-Sadaqua Walsalam Stadium, Kuwait City
Attendance: 15,000
Referee: Matthew Breeze (Australia)

Friendly

25 May 2008
17:00

Iran	3–2	Zambia
Nekounam 13' (pen.); Rezaei 35'; Aghili 88' (pen.)	Report	Mulenga 60'; Kola 62'

Azadi Stadium, Tehran
Attendance: 2,500
Referee: Masoud Moradi (Iran)

2010 FIFA World Cup qualifier – Third round

2 June 2008
19:00

Iran	0–0	United Arab Emirates
	Report

Azadi Stadium, Tehran
Attendance: 50,000
Referee: Lee Gi-young (South Korea)

2010 FIFA World Cup qualifier – Third round

7 June 2008
20:00

United Arab Emirates	0–1	Iran
	Report	Zandi 7'

Sheikh Khalifa International Stadium, Al-Ain
Attendance: 9,000
Referee: Yuichi Nishimura (Japan)

2010 FIFA World Cup qualifier – Third round

14 June 2008
20:00

Syria	0–2	Iran
	Report	Rezaei 65'; Khalili 90+3'

Abbasiyyin Stadium, Damascus
Attendance: 25,000
Referee: Satop Tongkhan (Thailand)

2010 FIFA World Cup qualifier – Third round

22 June 2008
20:30

Iran	2–0	Kuwait
Nekounam 16'; Rezaei 90+2'	Report

Azadi Stadium, Tehran
Attendance: 20,000
Referee: Sun Baojie (China)

2008 WAFF West Asian Championship – Preliminary round

7 August 2008
20:30

Iran	3–0	Palestine
Rahmati 29' (pen.); Rezaei 40'; Rafkhaei 86'	Report

Takhti Stadium, Tehran
Attendance: 5,000
Referee: Abdullah Al-Harrasi (Oman)

2008 WAFF West Asian Championship – Preliminary round

11 August 2008
20:30

Iran	6–1	Qatar
Meydavoudi 10', 90'; Alenemeh 33'; Aghili 49' (pen.); Hajsafi 61'; Rafkhaei 80'	Report	Abdullah 52'

Takhti Stadium, Tehran
Attendance: 5,000
Referee: Yousef Shahin (Jordan)

2008 WAFF West Asian Championship – Semifinal

13 August 2008
17:45

Iran	2–0	Syria
Rahmati 7' (pen.); Rezaei 52'	Report

Takhti Stadium, Tehran
Attendance: 5,000
Referee: Abdullah Al-Harrasi (Oman)

2008 WAFF West Asian Championship – Final

15 August 2008
19:20

Iran	2–1	Jordan
Aghili 21' (pen.); Rahmati 88'	Report	Deeb 85'

Azadi Stadium, Tehran
Attendance: 10,000
Referee: Mohammed Zarouni (United Arab Emirates)

Friendly

27 August 2008
19:00

Iran	1–0	Azerbaijan
Nouri 82'	Report

Azadi Stadium, Tehran
Attendance: 8,000
Referee: Hedayat Mombini (Iran)

2010 FIFA World Cup qualifier – Fourth round

6 September 2008
22:15

Saudi Arabia	1–1	Iran
Al-Harthi 29'	Report	Nekounam 81'

King Fahd International Stadium, Riyadh
Attendance: 50,000
Referee: Mark Shield (Australia)

2010 FIFA World Cup qualifier – Fourth round

15 October 2008
17:00

Iran	2–1	North Korea
Mahdavikia 9'; Nekounam 63'	Report	Jong Tae-se 72'

Azadi Stadium, Tehran
Attendance: 60,000
Referee: Abdullah Al-Hilali (Oman)

Friendly

9 November 2008
19:30

Qatar	0–1	Iran
	Report	Rezaei 74'

Jassim bin Hamad Stadium, Doha
Attendance: 5,000
Referee: Abdullah Al-Harrasi (Oman)

2010 FIFA World Cup qualifier – Fourth round

19 November 2008
19:15

United Arab Emirates	1–1	Iran
Jumaa 19'	Report	Bagheri 81'

Al-Maktoum Stadium, Dubai
Attendance: 8,000
Referee: Subkhiddin Mohd Salleh (Malaysia)

2008 Oman International Cup – Semifinal

17 December 2008
20:30

Iran	0–1	Ecuador
	Report	Martínez 55'

Sultan Qaboos Sports Complex, Muscat
Attendance: 5,000
Referee: Mahmoud Al-Ghatrifi (Oman)

2008 Oman International Cup – 3rd place match

19 December 2008
18:00

Iran	2–0	China
Seyed-Salehi 44' (pen.); Nouri 72'	Report

Sultan Qaboos Sports Complex, Muscat
Attendance: 15,000
Referee: Abdullah Al-Hilali (Oman)

== 2009 ==
Friendly

9 January 2009
15:00

Iran	3–1	China
Borhani 20'; Bagheri 27'; Zare 72' (pen.)	Report	Huang Bowen 66'

Azadi Stadium, Tehran
Attendance: 10,000
Referee: Saeid Mozaffarizadeh (Iran)

2011 AFC Asian Cup qualifier

14 January 2009
15:00

Iran	6–0	Singapore
Gholamnejad 43'; Bagheri 52'; Rezaei 55'; Zare 79'; Nouri 82', 83'	Report

Azadi Stadium, Tehran
Attendance: 3,000
Referee: Mohamad Mansour (Lebanon)

2011 AFC Asian Cup qualifier

28 January 2009
18:30

Thailand	0–0	Iran
	Report

Rajamangala Stadium, Bangkok
Attendance: 10,000
Referee: Valentin Kovalenko (Uzbekistan)

2010 FIFA World Cup qualifier – Fourth round

11 February 2009
15:00

Iran	1–1	South Korea
Nekounam 58'	Report	Park Ji-sung 81'

Azadi Stadium, Tehran
Attendance: 75,000
Referee: Ben Williams (Australia)

Friendly

14 March 2009
16:30

Iran	1–0	Kenya
Kazemi 55' (pen.)	Report

Azadi Stadium, Tehran
Attendance: 6,500
Referee: Yadollah Jahanbazi (Iran)

2010 FIFA World Cup qualifier – Fourth round

28 March 2009
19:00

Iran	1–2	Saudi Arabia
Shojaei 57'	Report	Hazazi 79'; Al-Muwallad 87'

Azadi Stadium, Tehran
Attendance: 100,000
Referee: Yuichi Nishimura (Japan)

Friendly

1 April 2009
17:00

Iran	1–1	Senegal
Madanchi 28'	Report	Cissé 57'

Azadi Stadium, Tehran
Attendance: 5,000
Referee: Masoud Moradi (Iran)

Friendly

1 June 2009
20:35

China	1–0	Iran
Gao Lin 45'	Report

Olympic Sports Center Stadium, Qinhuangdao
Attendance: 23,000
Referee: Fan Qi (China)

2010 FIFA World Cup qualifier – Fourth round

6 June 2009
17:00

North Korea	0–0	Iran
	Report

Yanggakdo Stadium, Pyongyang
Attendance: 30,000
Referee: Sun Baojie (China)

2010 FIFA World Cup qualifier – Fourth round

10 June 2009
19:00

Iran	1–0	United Arab Emirates
Karimi 53'	Report

Azadi Stadium, Tehran
Attendance: 38,000
Referee: Ravshan Irmatov (Uzbekistan)

2010 FIFA World Cup qualifier – Fourth round

17 June 2009
20:00

South Korea	1–1	Iran
Park Ji-sung 82'	Report	Shojaei 52'

World Cup Stadium, Seoul
Attendance: 40,000
Referee: Yuichi Nishimura (Japan)

Friendly

5 July 2009

Botswana	1–1	Iran
Mokgathi 30'	Report	Shirvand 3'

University of Botswana Stadium, Gaborone
Attendance: 3,000

* FIFA recognized this match as a full international despite the Iranian side being Iran U-23.

Friendly

12 August 2009
20:45

Bosnia and Herzegovina	2–3	Iran
Džeko 52', 65'	Report	Shojaei 79'; Borhani 86'; Teymourian 90+3'

Gradski Stadion Koševo, Sarajevo
Attendance: 20,000
Referee: Draženko Kovačić (Croatia)

Friendly

31 August 2009
22:00

Bahrain	4–2	Iran
Abdulrahman 12'; Abdullatif 30'; Isa 54'; Adnan 90+10' (pen.)	Report	Zandi 37', 84' (pen.)

National Stadium, Riffa
Attendance: 1,500
Referee: Siniša Zrnić (Bosnia and Herzegovina)

Friendly

5 September 2009
18:30

Uzbekistan	0–0	Iran
	Report

Pakhtakor Markaziy Stadium, Tashkent
Attendance: 9,500
Referee: Ravshan Irmatov (Uzbekistan)

Friendly

10 November 2009
18:00

Iran	1–0	Iceland
Ansarifard 53'	Report

Azadi Stadium, Tehran
Attendance: 1,000
Referee: Abdullah Balideh (Qatar)

2011 AFC Asian Cup qualifier

14 November 2009
18:00

Iran	1–0	Jordan
Nekounam 72'	Report

Azadi Stadium, Tehran
Attendance: 15,000
Referee: Yuichi Nishimura (Japan)

Friendly

18 November 2009
18:00

Iran	1–1	Macedonia
Teymourian 36'	Report	Pandev 49'

Azadi Stadium, Tehran
Attendance: 5,000
Referee: Masoud Moradi (Iran)

2011 AFC Asian Cup qualifier

22 November 2009
18:00

Jordan	1–0	Iran
Deeb 79'	Report

King Abdullah II Stadium, Amman
Attendance: 11,000
Referee: Ali Al-Badwawi (United Arab Emirates)

2010 Qatar Friendship Cup

28 December 2009
17:30

Qatar	3–2	Iran
Afif 6'; Mohamed 10', 90+5'	Report	Zeneyedpour 38'; Hajsafi 48'

Jassim bin Hamad Stadium, Doha
Attendance: 3,000
Referee: István Vad (Hungary)

2010 Qatar Friendship Cup

30 December 2009
16:00

Mali	2–1	Iran
N'Diaye 28'; Traoré 30'	Report	Ansarifard 11'

Jassim bin Hamad Stadium, Doha
Attendance: 2,000
Referee: Aouaz Trabelsi (Tunisia)

== Statistics ==
=== Results by year ===
Year	Pld	W	D	L	GF	GA	GD
2000	26	15	7	4	63	19	+44
2001	20	11	4	5	35	20	+15
2002	10	4	4	2	13	9	+4
2003	11	6	1	4	22	12	+10
2004	18	13	3	2	54	17	+37
2005	11	8	1	2	17	7	+10
2006	15	8	5	2	27	14	+13
2007	13	8	4	1	24	11	+13
2008	21	12	7	2	31	11	+20
2009	21	7	8	6	27	21	+6
Total	166	92	44	30	313	141	+172

=== Managers ===
Name	First match	Last match	Pld	W	D	L	GF	GA	GD
(Iran) Mansour Pourheidari	9 January 2000	4 February 2000	3	0	2	1	3	4	–1
(Iran) Jalal Talebi	22 March 2000	23 October 2000	21	13	5	3	39	15	+24
(Brazil) Ademar Braga	24 November 2000	19 January 2001	3	3	0	0	25	0	+25
(Croatia) Miroslav Blažević	24 April 2001	15 November 2001	19	10	4	5	31	20	+11
(Croatia) Branko Ivanković	6 February 2002	19 September 2002	10	4	4	2	13	9	+4
(Iran) Homayoun Shahrokhi	4 February 2003	26 September 2003	5	1	1	3	8	8	0
(Croatia) Branko Ivanković	12 October 2003	21 June 2006	42	29	6	7	101	40	+61
(Iran) Amir Ghalenoei	8 August 2006	22 July 2007	17	10	6	1	30	12	+18
(Iran) Parviz Mazloumi *	16 June 2007	24 June 2007	4	3	1	0	5	1	+4
(Iran) Mansour Ebrahimzadeh	10 January 2008	6 February 2008	3	0	3	0	0	0	0
(Iran) Ali Daei	20 March 2008	28 March 2009	24	15	6	3	43	15	+28
(Germany) Erich Rutemöller	1 April 2009	1 April 2009	1	0	1	0	1	1	0
(Iran) Afshin Ghotbi	1 June 2009	30 December 2009	13	4	4	5	14	15	–1
(Iran) Gholam Hossein Peyrovani **	5 July 2009	5 July 2009	1	0	1	0	1	1	0
Total			166	92	44	30	313	141	+172

* Coached Iran B team in 2007 WAFF Championship.
** Coached Iran U-23 team in Botswana friendly match.

=== Opponents ===
Team	Pld	W	D	L	GF	GA	GD
Angola	1	0	1	0	1	1	0
Austria	1	0	0	1	1	5	–4
Azerbaijan	3	2	1	0	4	2	+2
Bahrain	9	3	2	4	11	11	0
Belarus	2	0	1	1	3	4	–1
Bosnia and Herzegovina	5	4	1	0	16	7	+9
Botswana	1	0	1	0	1	1	0
Canada	1	0	0	1	0	1	–1
China	6	3	2	1	12	5	+7
Chinese Taipei	2	2	0	0	6	0	+6
Costa Rica	2	1	1	0	3	2	+1
Croatia	1	0	1	0	2	2	0
Cyprus	1	0	1	0	0	0	0
Ecuador	1	0	0	1	0	1	–1
Egypt	1	0	1	0	1	1	0
Georgia	1	1	0	0	2	1	+1
Germany	1	0	0	1	0	2	–2
Guam	1	1	0	0	19	0	+19
Iceland	1	1	0	0	1	0	+1
Iraq	9	6	2	1	11	5	+6
Ireland, Republic of	2	1	0	1	1	2	–1
Jamaica	1	1	0	0	8	1	+7
Japan	3	1	1	1	3	3	0
Jordan	11	6	1	4	13	8	+5
Kazakhstan	1	1	0	0	3	0	+3
Kenya	1	1	0	0	1	0	+1
Korea, North	6	5	1	0	11	2	+9
Korea, South	9	2	4	3	10	11	–1
Kuwait	5	2	2	1	9	7	+2
Laos	2	2	0	0	14	0	+14
Lebanon	5	5	0	0	14	0	+14
Libya	1	1	0	0	4	0	+4
Macedonia, North	2	1	1	0	4	2	+2
Malaysia	1	1	0	0	2	0	+2
Maldives	2	2	0	0	11	0	+11
Mali	1	0	0	1	1	2	–1
Mexico	3	0	0	3	2	9	–7
New Zealand	1	1	0	0	3	0	+3
Oman	2	1	1	0	7	4	+3
Palestine	3	2	1	0	6	1	+5
Panama	1	1	0	0	1	0	+1
Paraguay	1	0	1	0	1	1	0
Portugal	1	0	0	1	0	2	–2
Qatar	9	6	1	2	19	10	+9
Saudi Arabia	4	1	2	1	6	5	+1
Senegal	1	0	1	0	1	1	0
Singapore	1	1	0	0	6	0	+6
Slovakia	2	1	0	1	6	6	0
Syria	12	8	4	0	24	6	+18
Tajikistan	1	1	0	0	2	0	+2
Thailand	5	2	3	0	5	1	+4
Togo	1	1	0	0	2	0	+2
Ukraine	1	1	0	0	1	0	+1
United Arab Emirates	8	6	2	0	10	1	+9
United States	1	0	1	0	1	1	0
Uruguay	1	0	1	0	1	1	0
Uzbekistan	2	1	1	0	2	1	+1
Venezuela	1	1	0	0	1	0	+1
Zambia	1	1	0	0	3	2	+1
Total	166	92	44	30	313	141	+172
