= Karim Bagheri =

Iranian footballer and coach

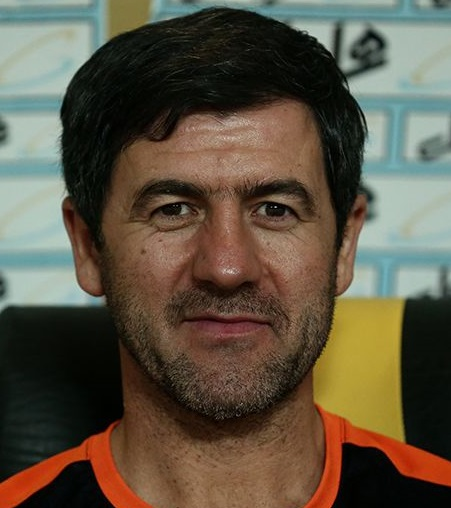
- Bagheri in 2019

Personal information
- Date of birth: 20 February 1974 (age 52)
- Place of birth: Tabriz, Iran
- Height: 1.85 m (6 ft 1 in)
- Position: Defensive midfielder

Team information
- Current team: Persepolis (assistant)

Senior career*
| Years | Team | Apps | (Gls) |
| 1992–1994 | Tractor Sazi | | |
| 1994–1996 | Keshavarz | | |
| 1996–1997 | Persepolis | 20 | (4) |
| 1997–2000 | Arminia Bielefeld | 51 | (6) |
| 2000 | → Al-Nasr (loan) | 8 | (4) |
| 2000–2001 | Charlton Athletic | 1 | (0) |
| 2001–2002 | Al-Sadd | 11 | (5) |
| 2002–2011 | Persepolis | 178 | (29) |

International career
| 1993–2010 | Iran | 87 | (50) |

Managerial career
- 2012–2013: Persepolis (assistant)
- 2015–2023: Persepolis (assistant)
- 2020–2022: Iran (assistant)
- 2024–: Persepolis (assistant)
- 2024–2025: Persepolis (caretaker)
- 2025: Persepolis (caretaker)
Medal record
Representing Iran
AFC Asian Cup
| Bronze medal – third place | 1996 United Arab Emirates | Team |
Asian Games
| Gold medal – first place | 1998 Bangkok | Team |
- * Club domestic league appearances and goals

Karim Bagheri (Persian: کريم باقری; born 20 February 1974) is an Iranian professional football coach and former midfielder who most notably played for the Iranian national team and Persian Gulf Pro League club Persepolis, where he also serves as assistant coach. He holds the record for most international goals scored as a midfielder.

== Club career ==
=== Early years ===
Bagheri was born in Tabriz. He was discovered by Vasile Godja and began playing for his hometown club Tractor, where he impressed enough to land himself a contract with Keshavarz. On 1 August 1996, Bagheri was signed on a free transfer by the capital's club, Persepolis. There, Bagheri enjoyed much success winning numerous titles and became a fan favorite. Numerous impressive displays ended up in Bagheri attracting attention from many European clubs and on 1 August 1997, a year after he signed a contract with Persepolis, Bagheri signed with Bundesliga side Arminia Bielefeld along with his fellow Iranian international Ali Daei.

=== Germany ===
Bagheris first season in Germany was not a huge success as Bielefeld was relegated to the 2. Bundesliga. In his second season, he established himself as a starter playing in the libero position, helping the team make it back to the Bundesliga. His performances during the 1998–99 season earned him a place in Kicker magazine's team of the year. He remained in Bielefeld for one more season, though his time in Germany ended sourly when he bought out his contract and returned to Persepolis again, though Persepolis loaned him to Al-Nasr in the United Arab Emirates.

=== England ===
At that time English clubs were interested in Bagheri and Charlton Athletic of the Premiership quickly signed him for an initial fee of £400,000. His father's death, international call-ups and injuries restricted him from making appearances in his first year. Alan Curbishley his manager on Bagheri:

"We took him as cover for Kinsella", Curbishley said. "Bagheri is a holding midfielder with great physique and an eye for goal. His goal-scoring record is unbelievable. He's got almost a goal every other game in 70 internationals which is an amazing feat for a midfield player.

"The problem was he never stayed fit while he was with us. After playing against Ipswich he went off to play for Iran and came back with a groin strain. Then it was a hamstring. His father died and he had to return to Iran the next day and we didn't see him for three weeks. Then he injured his hamstring again. It was one thing after another. It was a pity because the boy can play. He has all the attributes and understood the English game.

"He's an affable lad and from day one the other players liked him. Though he didn't speak English he got on with the others who respected him. He can play a bit and in 12 reserve matches for us he managed six goals. Had he stayed fit it may have been a different story. When the loan deal ended he came to me and said `I've loved it here but I haven't done myself justice'.

"I've noticed he is scoring regularly for Iran and whoever picks him up at set pieces on Saturday must be alert while he times his runs from midfield very well."

He had very little success there, only playing 15 minutes during the entire season in a game against Ipswich Town and being the first Iranian to play in the Premiership. He then moved to Al Sadd in Qatar.

=== Persepolis return ===
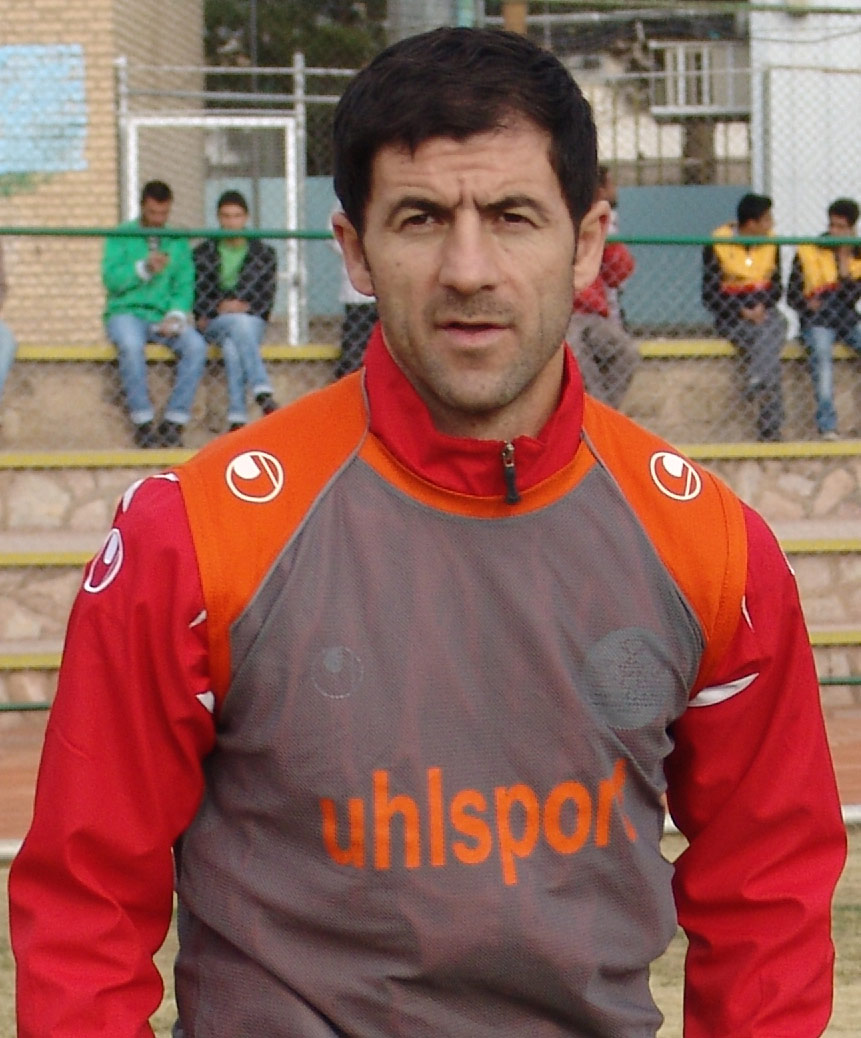
Bagheri in training with Persepolis

In 2002, Bagheri decided to return to Persepolis once again. In September 2006, many thought he had been released from the team after arguments with management and staff over the club's financial commitments and unpaid wages. Bagheri was instead disciplined but remained on the team. Bagheri has since established himself as one of the greatest icons of Persepolis and many compare his popularity with Ali Parvin. In the 2007–08 season, he captained the team to glory in the IPL after a six-year drought. During the 2008–09 season he was injured and missed many matches. He also missed matches because of the differences he had with the coach Nelo Vingada at the end of the season. He was the top scorer of the team for 2009–10 season and the most influential player on the team. In the second Sorkhabi derby of the season, Bagheri scored in the 87th minute with a trademark long-range shot to gain victory for Persepolis after six consecutive draws in the derby.

=== Retirement ===
On 1 December 2010, Bagheri announced that he would retire and leave Persepolis.

== International career ==
Bagheri was first called up to the Iran national team during the 1994 FIFA World Cup qualifiers, making his debut versus Pakistan on 6 June 1993. He displayed great football and soon became a starter for Iran in the midfield. He played in 1996 AFC Asian Cup for Team Melli and finished third.

He sparked Iran's comeback against Australia in the second leg of their 1998 FIFA World Cup qualifier in 1997. He scored the first of two goals that took Iran from two goals down to tie the game 2–2 and eventually become the last team to qualify for the tournament. Overall, he scored 19 goals during the 1998 FIFA World Cup qualification campaign, making him the top goalscorer from all six continental confederations. He played in 1998 Asian Games and won the competition. Bagheri also had one of the strongest right-footed shots and scored many fantastic goals against opponents, such as his game-tying goal against South Korea in the quarter finals of the 2000 Asian Cup in Lebanon.

=== Goal scoring record ===
On 2 June 1997, Bagheri scored seven times against the Maldives, and equalled the record for the most goals scored in a World Cup qualifying match, which was held by the Australian Gary Cole since 1981. Their joint record was broken on 11 April 2001 when another Australian, Archie Thompson scored 13 goals against American Samoa. Bagheri was named the world's second top goal scorer in official international matches by International Federation of Football History and Statistics (IFFHS), having scored 20 goals for Iran in 1997.

=== Initial retirement ===
Bagheri retired from the national team with 80 caps and 47 goals for the Iran national team after Iran's unsuccessful FIFA World Cup 2002 qualification campaign which ended with an aggregate defeat to Republic of Ireland in November 2001. He was called up to the national team again soon after World Cup 2006, but said he would not participate as he is retired from international football and has no plans on returning to it.

=== Return to national team ===
On 9 October 2008, Iran national team coach Ali Daei stated that because of Andranik Teymourian's injury Bagheri would be called up for the national team once again. On 9 November 2008, in a friendly match against Qatar, Bagheri appeared for Team Melli once again after almost seven years. Bagheri captained Iran in the 2010 FIFA World Cup qualification match against UAE on 19 November 2008, scoring for Iran. He has been given his favorite number 6 jersey back. He played few important matches for Team Melli in 2010 FIFA World Cup qualification against UAE and South Korea. He was invited again by Afshin Ghotbi but he stated in Navad that he only returned to the Iran national team because of Daei and would not participate in any more matches.

=== Retirement match ===
On 2 October 2010, Bagheri announced he would play his last match with the Iran national team on 7 October 2010 against Brazil in the Sheikh Zayed Stadium in Abu Dhabi, United Arab Emirates.

== Coaching career ==
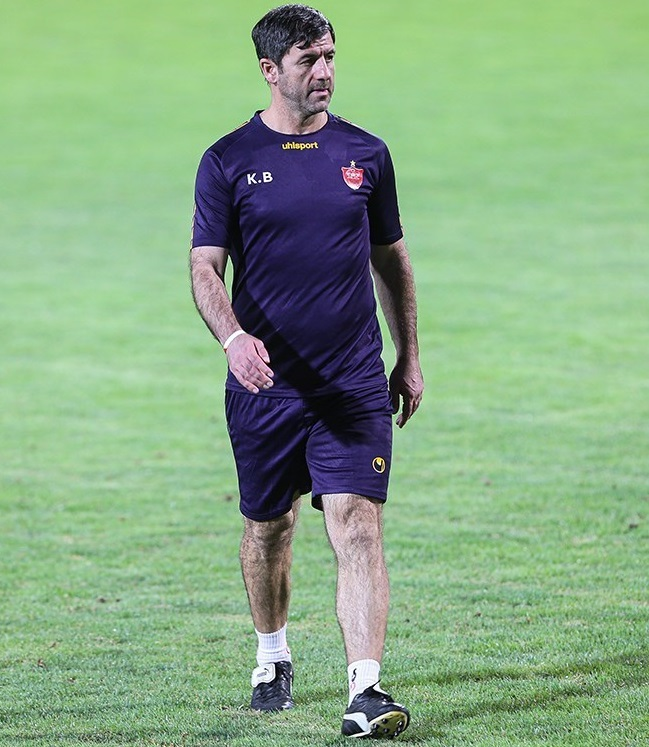
Bagheri in Persepolis training in 2020

Two years after his retirement, he was offered a coaching role at Persepolis by newly appointed head coach Yahya Golmohammadi. He was promoted as the first-team coach in the coaching staff of Ali Daei.

On 8 April 2015, Karim was named assistant manager of Persepolis again.

=== Managerial statistics ===
As of 30 October 2025

| Team | Nat | From | To | Record | | | | |
| Team | Nat | From | To | G | W | D | L | Win % |
|---|---|---|---|---|---|---|---|---|
| Persepolis | (Iran) | 23 December 2024 | 26 January 2025 | 5 | 3 | 1 | 1 | 60.00 |
| Persepolis | (Iran) | 27 October 2025 | 27 October 2025 | 1 | 0 | 1 | 0 | 0.00 |
| Total | | | | 6 | 3 | 2 | 1 | 50.00 |

== Personal life ==
During the Mahsa Amini protests, Bagheri was removed from Persepolis for refusing to retract his support for the protests.

On 9 February 2026, in the midst of the 2025–2026 Iranian protests, Bagheri publicly objected to being included on a list of supporters of the 1979 Islamic Revolution by the Ministry of Sport and Youth, ahead of the Revolution's anniversary.

== Career statistics ==
=== Club ===
Appearances and goals by club, season and competition
| Club | Season | League | | | Cup | | Continental | | Total | |
| Club | Season | Division | Apps | Goals | Apps | Goals | Apps | Goals | Apps | Goals |
|---|---|---|---|---|---|---|---|---|---|---|
| Tractor | 1992–93 | Azadegan League | | | 0 | 0 | — | | | |
| Tractor | 1993–94 | Azadegan League | | | | | — | | | |
| Tractor | Total | | | | | | | | | |
| Keshavarz | 1994–95 | Azadegan League | | | | | — | | | |
| Keshavarz | 1995–96 | Azadegan League | | | | | — | | | |
| Keshavarz | Total | | | | | | | | | |
| Persepolis | 1996–97 | Azadegan League | 20 | 4 | 0 | 0 | 4 | 3 | 24 | 7 |
| Arminia Bielefeld | 1997–98 | Bundesliga | 18 | 3 | 0 | 0 | — | | 18 | 3 |
| Arminia Bielefeld | 1998–99 | 2. Bundesliga | 22 | 2 | 3 | 1 | — | | 25 | 3 |
| Arminia Bielefeld | 1999–00 | Bundesliga | 11 | 1 | 1 | 0 | — | | 12 | 1 |
| Arminia Bielefeld | Total | | 51 | 6 | 4 | 1 | — | | 55 | 7 |
| Al-Nasr | 1999–00 | UAE Pro-League | 8 | 4 | 1 | 1 | — | | 9 | 5 |
| Charlton | 2000–01 | Premier League | 1 | 0 | 0 | 0 | — | | 1 | 0 |
| Al-Sadd | 2001–02 | Qatar Stars League | 11 | 5 | 0 | 0 | 4 | 0 | 15 | 5 |
| Persepolis | 2002–03 | Iran Pro League | 9 | 0 | 4 | 3 | 3 | 0 | 16 | 3 |
| Persepolis | 2003–04 | Iran Pro League | 20 | 3 | 4 | 3 | — | | 24 | 6 |
| Persepolis | 2004–05 | Iran Pro League | 28 | 2 | 1 | 0 | — | | 29 | 2 |
| Persepolis | 2005–06 | Iran Pro League | 23 | 0 | 3 | 0 | — | | 26 | 0 |
| Persepolis | 2006–07 | Persian Gulf Cup | 13 | 2 | 2 | 0 | — | | 15 | 2 |
| Persepolis | 2007–08 | Persian Gulf Cup | 26 | 3 | 2 | 1 | — | | 28 | 4 |
| Persepolis | 2008–09 | Persian Gulf Cup | 29 | 9 | 1 | 0 | 4 | 0 | 34 | 9 |
| Persepolis | 2009–10 | Persian Gulf Cup | 22 | 10 | 5 | 3 | — | | 27 | 13 |
| Persepolis | 2010–11 | Persian Gulf Cup | 8 | 0 | 0 | 0 | 0 | 0 | 8 | 0 |
| Persepolis | Total | | 178 | 29 | 22 | 10 | 7 | 0 | 207 | 39 |
| Career total | | | | | 26 | 11 | 15 | 3 | | |

=== International ===
Appearances and goals by national team and year
| National team | Year | Apps | Goals |
|---|---|---|---|
| Iran | 1993 | 9 | 1 |
| Iran | 1994 | 4 | 0 |
| Iran | 1995 | 0 | 0 |
| Iran | 1996 | 17 | 12 |
| Iran | 1997 | 15 | 20 |
| Iran | 1998 | 11 | 3 |
| Iran | 1999 | 0 | 0 |
| Iran | 2000 | 13 | 9 |
| Iran | 2001 | 11 | 2 |
| Iran | 2008 | 2 | 1 |
| Iran | 2009 | 4 | 2 |
| Iran | 2010 | 1 | 0 |
| Total | | 87 | 50 |

Scores and results list Iran's goal tally first, score column indicates score after each Bagheri goal.

List of international goals scored by Karim Bagheri
| No. | Date | Venue | Opponent | Score | Result | Competition |
|---|---|---|---|---|---|---|
| 1 | 3 June 1993 | Azadi Stadium, Tehran, Iran | Pakistan | 3–0 | 5–0 | ECO Cup 1993 |
| 2 | 24 April 1996 | Olympic Stadium, Ashgabat, Turkmenistan | Turkmenistan | 1–1 | 1–1 | Friendly |
| 3 | 10 June 1996 | Azadi Stadium, Tehran, Iran | Nepal | 1–0 | 8–0 | 1996 AFC Asian Cup qualification |
| 4 | 10 June 1996 | Azadi Stadium, Tehran, Iran | Nepal | 5–0 | 8–0 | 1996 AFC Asian Cup qualification |
| 5 | 12 June 1996 | Azadi Stadium, Tehran, Iran | Sri Lanka | 2–0 | 7–0 | 1996 AFC Asian Cup qualification |
| 6 | 17 June 1996 | Sultan Qaboos Sports Complex, Muscat, Oman | Sri Lanka | 1–0 | 4–0 | 1996 AFC Asian Cup qualification |
| 7 | 17 June 1996 | Sultan Qaboos Sports Complex, Muscat, Oman | Sri Lanka | 2–0 | 4–0 | 1996 AFC Asian Cup qualification |
| 8 | 17 June 1996 | Sultan Qaboos Sports Complex, Muscat, Oman | Sri Lanka | 3–0 | 4–0 | 1996 AFC Asian Cup qualification |
| 9 | 19 June 1996 | Sultan Qaboos Sports Complex, Muscat, Oman | Nepal | 2–0 | 4–0 | 1996 AFC Asian Cup qualification |
| 10 | 19 June 1996 | Sultan Qaboos Sports Complex, Muscat, Oman | Nepal | 3–0 | 4–0 | 1996 AFC Asian Cup qualification |
| 11 | 21 June 1996 | Sultan Qaboos Sports Complex, Muscat, Oman | Oman | 2–1 | 2–1 | 1996 AFC Asian Cup qualification |
| 12 | 7 December 1996 | Al-Maktoum Stadium, Dubai, United Arab Emirates | Saudi Arabia | 1–0 | 3–0 | 1996 Asian Cup |
| 13 | 16 December 1996 | Al-Maktoum Stadium, Dubai, United Arab Emirates | South Korea | 1–1 | 6–2 | 1996 Asian Cup |
| 14 | 2 June 1997 | Abbasiyyin Stadium, Damascus, Syria | Maldives | 1–0 | 17–0 | 1998 FIFA World Cup qualification |
| 15 | 2 June 1997 | Abbasiyyin Stadium, Damascus, Syria | Maldives | 2–0 | 17–0 | 1998 FIFA World Cup qualification |
| 16 | 2 June 1997 | Abbasiyyin Stadium, Damascus, Syria | Maldives | 3–0 | 17–0 | 1998 FIFA World Cup qualification |
| 17 | 2 June 1997 | Abbasiyyin Stadium, Damascus, Syria | Maldives | 10–0 | 17–0 | 1998 FIFA World Cup qualification |
| 18 | 2 June 1997 | Abbasiyyin Stadium, Damascus, Syria | Maldives | 12–0 | 17–0 | 1998 FIFA World Cup qualification |
| 19 | 2 June 1997 | Abbasiyyin Stadium, Damascus, Syria | Maldives | 13–0 | 17–0 | 1998 FIFA World Cup qualification |
| 20 | 2 June 1997 | Abbasiyyin Stadium, Damascus, Syria | Maldives | 16–0 | 17–0 | 1998 FIFA World Cup qualification |
| 21 | 4 June 1997 | Abbasiyyin Stadium, Damascus, Syria | Kyrgyzstan | 1–0 | 7–0 | 1998 FIFA World Cup qualification |
| 22 | 4 June 1997 | Abbasiyyin Stadium, Damascus, Syria | Kyrgyzstan | 2–0 | 7–0 | 1998 FIFA World Cup qualification |
| 23 | 9 June 1997 | Azadi Stadium, Tehran, Iran | Kyrgyzstan | 2–1 | 3–1 | 1998 FIFA World Cup qualification |
| 24 | 11 June 1997 | Azadi Stadium, Tehran, Iran | Maldives | 2–0 | 9–0 | 1998 FIFA World Cup qualification |
| 25 | 11 June 1997 | Azadi Stadium, Tehran, Iran | Maldives | 5–0 | 9–0 | 1998 FIFA World Cup qualification |
| 26 | 17 August 1997 | Varsity Stadium, Toronto, Canada | Canada | 1–0 | 1–0 | Friendly |
| 27 | 13 September 1997 | Jinzhou Stadium, Dalian, China | China | 1–2 | 4–2 | 1998 FIFA World Cup qualification |
| 28 | 19 September 1997 | Azadi Stadium, Tehran, Iran | Saudi Arabia | 1–1 | 1–1 | 1998 FIFA World Cup qualification |
| 29 | 26 September 1997 | Kuwait National Stadium, Kuwait City, Kuwait | Kuwait | 1–1 | 1–1 | 1998 FIFA World Cup qualification |
| 30 | 3 October 1997 | Azadi Stadium, Tehran, Iran | Qatar | 2–0 | 3–0 | 1998 FIFA World Cup qualification |
| 31 | 3 October 1997 | Azadi Stadium, Tehran, Iran | Qatar | 3–0 | 3–0 | 1998 FIFA World Cup qualification |
| 32 | 17 October 1997 | Azadi Stadium, Tehran, Iran | China | 3–0 | 4–1 | 1998 FIFA World Cup qualification |
| 33 | 29 November 1997 | Melbourne Cricket Ground, Melbourne, Australia | Australia | 1–2 | 2–2 | 1998 FIFA World Cup qualification |
| 34 | 10 December 1998 | Suphachalasai Stadium, Bangkok, Thailand | Tajikistan | 4–0 | 5–0 | 1998 Asian Games |
| 35 | 12 December 1998 | Suphachalasai Stadium, Bangkok, Thailand | China | 2–1 | 2–1 | 1998 Asian Games |
| 36 | 19 December 1998 | Rajamangala National Stadium, Bangkok, Thailand | Kuwait | 1–0 | 2–0 | 1998 Asian Games |
| 37 | 9 June 2000 | Azadi Stadium, Tehran, Iran | Macedonia | 1–0 | 3–1 | LG CUP |
| 38 | 12 October 2000 | Camille Chamoun Sports City Stadium, Beirut, Lebanon | Lebanon | 1–0 | 4–0 | 2000 AFC Asian Cup |
| 39 | 23 October 2000 | International Olympic Stadium, Tripoli, Lebanon | South Korea | 1–0 | 1–2 | 2000 AFC Asian Cup |
| 40 | 24 November 2000 | Takhti Stadium, Tabriz, Iran | Guam | 2–0 | 19–0 | 2002 FIFA World Cup qualification |
| 41 | 24 November 2000 | Takhti Stadium, Tabriz, Iran | Guam | 3–0 | 19–0 | 2002 FIFA World Cup qualification |
| 42 | 24 November 2000 | Takhti Stadium, Tabriz, Iran | Guam | 4–0 | 19–0 | 2002 FIFA World Cup qualification |
| 43 | 24 November 2000 | Takhti Stadium, Tabriz, Iran | Guam | 5–0 | 19–0 | 2002 FIFA World Cup qualification |
| 44 | 24 November 2000 | Takhti Stadium, Tabriz, Iran | Guam | 6–0 | 19–0 | 2002 FIFA World Cup qualification |
| 45 | 24 November 2000 | Takhti Stadium, Tabriz, Iran | Guam | 7–0 | 19–0 | 2002 FIFA World Cup qualification |
| 46 | 25 October 2001 | Azadi Stadium, Tehran, Iran | United Arab Emirates | 1–0 | 1–0 | 2002 FIFA World Cup qualification |
| 47 | 31 October 2001 | Al Nahyan Stadium, Abu Dhabi, United Arab Emirates | United Arab Emirates | 2–0 | 3–0 | 2002 FIFA World Cup qualification |
| 48 | 19 November 2008 | Al-Maktoum Stadium, Dubai, United Arab Emirates | United Arab Emirates | 1–1 | 1–1 | 2010 FIFA World Cup qualification |
| 49 | 2 January 2009 | Azadi Stadium, Tehran, Iran | China | 2–0 | 3–1 | Friendly |
| 50 | 9 January 2009 | Azadi Stadium, Tehran, Iran | Singapore | 2–0 | 6–0 | 2011 AFC Asian Cup qualification |

== Honours ==
Persepolis

- Iranian Football League: 1996–97, 2007–08
- Hazfi Cup: 2009–10, 2010–11

Arminia Bielefeld

- 2. Bundesliga: 1998–99

Al-Sadd

- Arab Club Champions Cup: 2001

Iran

- Asian Games Gold Medal: 1998

Individual

- Asian Player of the Month: July 1997
- Asian Goal of the Month: July 1997
- AFC Asian Cup Team of the Tournament: 2000
- Football Iran News & Events: Midfielder of the year (2007–08)
- Iran Football Federation Award: Player of the year (2007–08)
- MasterCard Asian/Oceanian Team of the 20th Century: 1998
- Asian All Stars: 1997, 2000

== See also ==
- List of men's footballers with 50 or more international goals
