= Jamal Mubarak =

Kuwaiti footballer

Personal information
- Full name: Jamal Abdulrahman Mubarak
- Date of birth: 21 March 1974 (age 52)
- Height: 1.80 m (5 ft 11 in)
- Position: Defender

Senior career*
Years	Team	Apps	(Gls)
1995–2004	Al Tadhamon		
2004–2007	Qadsia		

International career
1994–2006	Kuwait	107	(9)
- * Club domestic league appearances and goals

Jamal Abdulrahman Mubarak (born 21 March 1974) is a Kuwaiti former footballer who played as a defender.

== Career ==
Mubarak played club football for Al Tadhamon and Qadsia. He earned 107 caps for the Kuwaiti national team between 1994 and 2006, scoring 9 goals.

== See also ==
- List of men's footballers with 100 or more international caps
