= Abdul Rahman Al-Zaid =

Saudi Arabian football referee (born 1959)

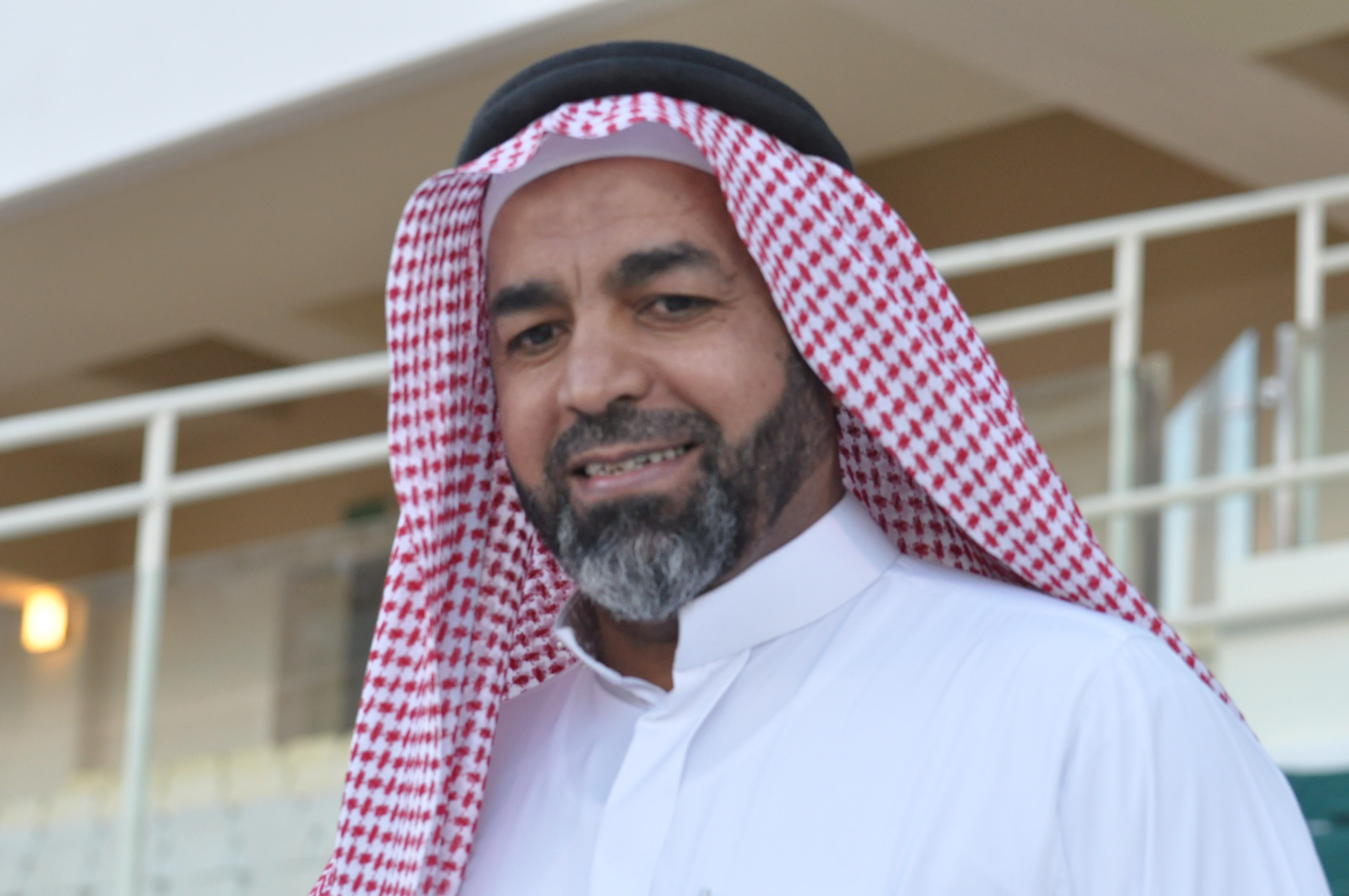
- Born: 11 January 1959 (age 67)

Abdul Rahman Al-Zaid (Arabic: عبد الرحمن الزيد; born 11 January 1959) is a retired Saudi football referee. He is known for supervising two matches during the 1998 FIFA World Cup in France.
