= Takhti Stadium (Tabriz) =

Stadium in Tabriz, Iran

Coordinates: 38°04′03″N 46°18′05″E

- "Bağ Şumal"
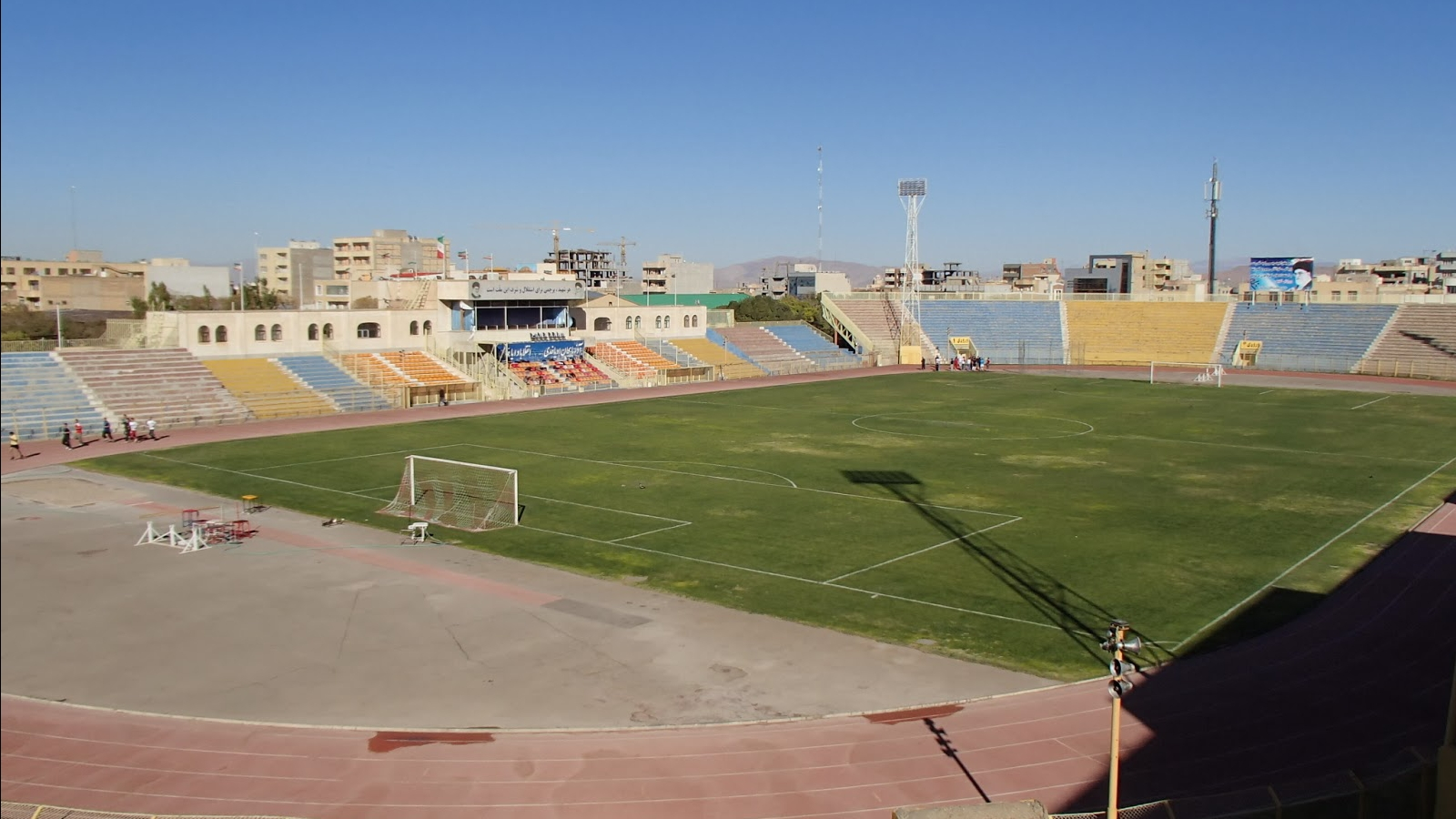
- Interactive map of Takhti Stadium
- Full name: Takhti Stadium of Tabriz
- Former names: Reza Pahlavi Stadium / Bagh Shomal Stadium (1949–1979)
- Location: Tabriz, Iran
- Owner: Ministry of Sport and Youth (Iran)
- Capacity: 25,000
- Surface: Grass

Construction
- Built: 1949
- Opened: 12 January 1950
- Renovated: 1957, 1975

Tenants
- Machine Sazi (1969–2017); Tractor (1970–1996)

The Takhti Stadium^{2} (Persian: ورزشگاه تختي, Vârzeshgah-e Taxti) formerly known as Bagh Shomal Stadium^{3} (Persian: ورزشگاه باغ شمال, Vârzeshgah-e Baq Shomal) and Reza Pahlavi Stadium (Persian: ورزشگاه رضا پهلوی, Vârzeshgah-e Reza Pahlavi) is a multi-use stadium in Tabriz, Iran. It is currently used mostly for football matches and is the home stadium of Iran Pro League team Machine Sazi. The stadium can accommodate 25,000 spectators. Iran Team Melli's largest ever victory was recorded in this stadium, on 24 November 2000, in a match against Guam, which Iran won 19–0.

== Important games ==
=== AFC Asian Cup 1976 ===
In 1976, part of 1976 AFC Asian Cup games held in Bagh Shomal Stadium. The field of six teams was split into two groups of three. The games of Group A, including Kuwait, China PR and Malaysia were hosted by Tabriz.

| Date | Team #1 | Res. | Team #2 | Round |
|---|---|---|---|---|
| 3 June 1976 | Kuwait | 2–0 | Malaysia | 1976 AFC Asian Cup |
| 5 June 1976 | China | 1–1 | Malaysia | 1976 AFC Asian Cup |
| 7 June 1976 | China | 0–1 | Kuwait | 1976 AFC Asian Cup |

=== Iran National Football Team ===
Takhti Stadium was also hosted some of Iran national football team matches, including the first round of 2002 World Cup qualification, and the 2002 LG Cup tournament which was held among the football national teams of Iran, Paraguay, Morocco and South Africa. Takhti Stadium has played host to the friendly matches involving the Iran national football team.

| Date | Team #1 | Result | Team #2 | Round |
|---|---|---|---|---|
| 1986 | Iran | 1–1 | Azerbaijan XI | Unofficial Friendly |
| 17 May 1996 | Iran | 2–0 | Qatar | Friendly |
| 14 April 1998 | Iran | 3–0 | Kuwait | Friendly |
| 24 November 2000 | Iran | 19–0 | Guam | 2002 FIFA World Cup qualification |
| 28 November 2000 | Iran | 2–0 | Tajikistan | 2002 FIFA World Cup qualification |
| 10 August 2002 | Iran | 1–1 | Azerbaijan | Friendly |
| 17 September 2002 | Iran | 1–1^{1} | Morocco XI | 2002 LG Cup |
| 19 September 2002 | Iran | 1–1^{1} | Paraguay | 2002 LG Cup |

=== Other National Football Team ===
| Date | Team #1 | Result | Team #2 | Round |
|---|---|---|---|---|
| 26 November 2000 | Tajikistan | 16–0 | Guam | 2002 FIFA World Cup qualification |
| 17 September 2002 | Paraguay | 2–0 | South Africa | 2002 LG Cup |
| 19 September 2002 | Morocco | 0–0 | Paraguay | 2002 LG Cup |

== See also ==
- Sahand Stadium
- Marzdaran Stadium
- Bonyan Dizel Stadium
- Tractor Stadium

== Notes ==
1. Iran national football team won at Penalty.
2. Official name.
3. Pre-revolutionary name and still common among native peoples.
