= 1975 in association football =

The following are the football (soccer) events of the year 1975 throughout the world.

== Events ==
- European Cup 1975: Won by FC Bayern Munich after defeating Leeds United 1–0.
- Copa Libertadores 1975: Won by Independiente after defeating Unión Española on an aggregate score of 2–0.
- England: 1975 FA Cup Final: West Ham United 2, Fulham 0. (Alan Taylor 2)

== Winners club national championship ==
=== Asia ===
- Iran: Taj

=== Europe ===
- East Germany: 1. FC Magdeburg
- England: Derby County
- France: AS Saint-Etienne
- Hungary: Újpest FC
- Italy: Juventus
- Netherlands: PSV Eindhoven
- Poland: Ruch Chorzów
- Scotland: Rangers
- Spain: Real Madrid
- Turkey: Fenerbahçe
- West Germany: Borussia Mönchengladbach
- Yugoslavia: Hajduk Split

=== North America ===
- Mexico: Toluca
- United States / Canada:
  - Tampa Bay Rowdies (NASL)

=== South America ===
- Argentina:
  - Metropolitano – River Plate
  - Nacional – River Plate
- Brazil: Internacional
- Paraguay: Olimpia Asunción

== International tournaments ==
- Copa América (July 17 – October 28, 1975)
  1. Peru
  2. Colombia
  3. Brazil and Uruguay
- Pan American Games in Mexico (October 13 – October 25, 1975)
  1. Brazil and Mexico
  2. —
  3. Argentina
- 1975 British Home Championship (May 17 – May 24, 1975)

England

- 1975 Copa Ciudad de México (August 17 – August 31, 1975)
  1. Mexico
  2. Argentina
  3. Costa Rica
- 1975 President's Cup Football Tournament (May 10 – May 22, 1975)
  1. South Korea
  2. Myanmar
  3. (Iran) Homa
- 1975 Iran International Tournament (July 11 – July 20, 1975)
  1. (Czechoslovakia) FK Teplice
  2. Iran B
  3. (Soviet Union) USSR U23
- 1975 Merdeka Tournament (July 29 – August 17, 1975)
  1. South Korea
  2. Malaysia
  3. Myanmar
- South Pacific Games in Guam (August 2 – August 9, 1975)
  1. Tahiti
  2. New Caledonia
  3. Solomon Islands
- Mediterranean Games in Algeria (August 24 – September 6, 1975)
  1. Algeria B
  2. France Amateurs
  3. Tunisia
- SEAP Games in Thailand (December 9 – December 18, 1975)
  1. Thailand
  2. Malaysia
  3. Myanmar & Singapore
- 1975 Palestine Cup of Nations (December 19 – December 28, 1975)
  1. Egypt
  2. Iraq
  3. Sudan
- 1975 King's Cup (December 20, 1975 – January 4, 1976)
  1. South Korea
  2. Myanmar
  3. Thailand

== Births ==
- January 1 – Bengt Sæternes, Norwegian footballer and manager
- January 12 – Rick Hoogendorp, Dutch footballer
- January 27 – Damien Neville, Bahamian retired footballer
- February 2 – Ieroklis Stoltidis, Greek footballer
- February 11 – Marek Špilár, Slovak international footballer (died 2013)
- February 18 – Gary Neville, English footballer
- February 18 – Keith Gillespie, Irish footballer
- February 21 – Aleksei Ilatovskiy, former Russian footballer
- March 5 – Aleksejs Volosanovs, retired Latvian footballer
- March 9 – Roy Makaay, Dutch footballer
- March 17 – Trương Văn Hải, Vietnamese footballer
- March 23
  - Eduard Doronin, former Russian footballer
  - Robert Wallon, Poland former professional footballer
- April 3 – Joakim Persson, Swedish footballer
- April 9 – Robbie Fowler, English footballer
- April 13 – Bruce Dyer, English footballer
- April 14 – Konstantinos Nebegleras, Greek footballer
- April 17 – Stefano Fiore, Italian footballer
- April 19 – Adrian Vizingr, retired Czech footballer
- April 28 – Sebastián Pereyra, Uruguayan footballer
- May 1 – Marc-Vivien Foé, Cameroonian international footballer (died 2003)
- May 2 – David Beckham, English international footballer
- May 8 – Dmitri Ustritski, Estonian international footballer
- May 25 – Raúl Muñoz, Chilean footballer
- June 9 – Paul Agostino, Australian footballer
- June 10 – Darren Eadie, English footballer
- June 18 – Aleksandrs Kolinko, Latvian footballer
- June 22 – Sergei Lutsevich, former Russian footballer
- June 24 – Christie Rampone, American women's soccer player
- June 27 – Timote Moleni, Tongan footballer and coach
- July 1 – Julio Briones, Ecuadorian footballer
- July 3 – Deda (Wellington Nobre de Morais), former Brazilian footballer
- July 5 – Hernán Crespo, Argentinian international footballer
- July 22 – Marilia, Brazilian footballer
- August 16
  - Jonatan Johansson, Finnish footballer, coach, and manager
  - Pantelis Konstantinidis, Greek footballer
- August 28 – Serhiy Maherovych, retired Ukrainian professional footballer
- August 31 – Hilario Cuenú, Colombian football manager and former player
- September 3 – Xavier Ipharraguerre, French former professional footballer
- September 18 – Richard Appleby, English footballer
- September 18 – Carlos Armando Gruezo Quiñónez, Ecuadorian footballer
- September 19 – Oumar Bagayoko, Malian footballer
- September 28 – Maksim Shiryayev, former Russian footballer
- October 8 – Sébastien Ducourneau, French professional footballer
- October 17 – Daniel Ung, retired Swedish footballer
- October 21 – Henrique Hilário, Portuguese footballer
- October 30
  - Dimitar Ivankov, Bulgarian footballer
  - Alessandro Piovesan, Italian former footballer
- October 31 – Fabio Celestini, Swiss footballer
- November 10 – Semjbaataryn Baatarsüren, Mongolian international footballer
- November 12 – Balázs Kiskapusi, Hungarian former footballer
- November 13 – Quim, Portuguese footballer
- November 15
  - Luca Amoruso, Italian retired footballer
  - Christophe Anly, retired Malagasy football
- November 27 – Rain Vessenberg, Estonian footballer
- November 30 – Ben Thatcher, English footballer
- December 7 – Ivaylo Petkov, Bulgarian footballer
- December 11 – Dario Simic, Croatian footballer
- December 12 – Wesley Charles, Vincentian footballer
- December 20 – Bartosz Bosacki, Polish footballer
- December 25 – Dušan Sadžakov, Montenegrin former professional footballer
- December 27 – Martin Nash, Canadian soccer player

== Deaths ==
=== March ===
- March 31 – Virginio Rosetta, Italian defender, winner of the 1934 FIFA World Cup. (73)

=== July ===
- July 27 – Edmundo Piaggio, Argentine defender, runner-up of the 1930 FIFA World Cup. (69)

=== October ===
- October 27 – Peregrino Anselmo, Uruguayan striker, winner of the 1930 FIFA World Cup. (73)

=== November ===
- November 16 - Agustin Gomez Pagola, Spanish-born Soviet footballer, and plays as left back, and the part of the defender.
