= Tunisia national football team results (unofficial matches) =

This is a list of the Tunisia national football team's results from 1920s to the present day that, for various reasons, are not accorded the status of official internationals.

== Results ==
Key
| Win |
| Draw |
| Defeat |

=== 1920s ===
| 11 March 1928 Tunisia's first match | Tunisia | 2–8 | France B | Tunis, Tunisia |
| | | Report | | Stadium: Stade Vélodrome |

| 1929 Friendly | Tunisia | 0–1 | South East | Tunis, Tunisia |
| | | Report | | Stadium: Stade Vélodrome |

=== 1930s ===
| 23 March 1930 Friendly | Tunisia | 0–5 | France B | Tunis, Tunisia |
| | | Report | | Stadium: Stade Vélodrome |

| 13 November 1932 Friendly | Tunisia | 1–0 | French Algeria | Tunis, Tunisia |
| | | Report | | Stadium: Stade Vélodrome |

| 26 March 1933 Friendly | Tunisia | 1–6 | France B | Tunis, Tunisia |
| | | Report | | Stadium: Stade Vélodrome |

| 13 November 1933 Friendly | French Algeria | 0–3 | Tunisia | Algiers, French Algeria |
| | | Report | | Stadium: Stade Municipal |

| 11 November 1934 Friendly | French Algeria | 2–2 | Tunisia | Algiers, French Algeria |
| | | Report | | Stadium: Stade Municipal |

| 10 November 1935 Friendly | French Algeria | 2–4 | Tunisia | Algiers, French Algeria |
| | | Report | | Stadium: Stade Municipal |

| 1939 Friendly | Tunisia | 2–2 | SK Kladno | Tunis, Tunisia |
| | | Report | | Stadium: Stade Vélodrome |

| 1939 Friendly | Tunisia | 4–1 | Paris Amateurs | Tunis, Tunisia |
| | | Report | | Stadium: Stade Vélodrome |

=== 1940s ===
| 1941 Friendly | Tunisia | 2–7 | France | Tunis, Tunisia |
| | | Report | | Stadium: Stade Vélodrome |

| 1947 Friendly | Tunisia | 2–6 | France Military | Tunis, Tunisia |
| | | Report | | Stadium: Stade Victor Perez |

=== 1950s ===
| 1 November 1950 Friendly | Tunisia | 1–5 | France B | Tunis, Tunisia |
| | | Report | | Stadium: Stade Géo André |

| 18 March 1956 Friendly | Tunisia | 1–0 | South West | Tunis, Tunisia |
| | Ghariani | | | Stadium: Stade Géo André |

| 30 December 1956 Friendly | Tunisia | 4–2 | Flyeralarm Admira | Tunis, Tunisia |
| | Diwa x 2 Braïek x 2 | | ? | Stadium: Stade Géo André |

| 21 April 1957 Friendly | Tunisia | 1–4 | AIK | Tunis, Tunisia |
| | Zlassi | | ? | Stadium: Stade Géo André |

| 5 May 1957 Friendly | Tunisia | 2–2 | South West | Tunis, Tunisia |
| | Diwa 5'; Zlassi 54' | | ? | Stadium: Stade Géo André |

| 1 June 1957 Friendly | Tunisia | 1–2 | FLN Team | Tunis, Tunisia |
| | | | | Stadium: Stade Géo André |

| 25 June 1957 Friendly | Tunisia | 1–2 | FLN Team | Tunis, Tunisia |
| | | | | Stadium: Stade Géo André |

| 1 July 1957 Friendly | Tunisia | 0–4 | FLN Team | Tunis, Tunisia |
| | | | | Stadium: Stade Géo André |

| 7 July 1957 Friendly | Tunisia | 2–1 | Egypt Military | Tunis, Tunisia |
| | Ben Azzedine 5'; Diwa 27' | | ? | Stadium: Stade Géo André |

| 5 November 1957 Friendly | Tunisia | 7–1 | UK Royal Navy | Tunis, Tunisia |
| | Krimou x 2; Karmous; Ghariani x 2; Messaoud; Henia | | ? | Stadium: Stade Géo André |

| 1 May 1958 Friendly | Tunisia | 2–9 | FLN Team | Tunis, Tunisia |
| | | | | Stadium: Stade Géo André |

| 3 May 1958 Friendly | Tunisia | 1–5 | FLN Team | Tunis, Tunisia |
| | Bouzid 70' | Report | Brahimi x 2 Kermali; Mekhloufi; Rouaï | Stadium: Stade Géo André; Attendance: 7,000 |

| 11 May 1958 Friendly | Tunisia | 1–5 | FLN Team | Tunis, Tunisia |
| | Touati 20' | Report | Bouchouk; Ben Tifour; Kermali x 2 Mekhloufi | Stadium: Stade Géo André; Attendance: 8,000 |

| 1 January 1959 Friendly | Tunisia | 0–3 | Hungary B | Tunis, Tunisia |
| | | | | Stadium: Stade Géo André |

| 10 May 1959 Friendly | Tunisia | 0–2 | Czechoslovakia B | Tunis, Tunisia |
| | | | | Stadium: Stade Géo André |

| 10 June 1959 Friendly | Tunisia | 1–2 | Italy C | Tunis, Tunisia |
| | | | | Stadium: Stade Géo André |

| 3 October 1959 Friendly | Tunisia | 0–7 | FLN Team | Tunis, Tunisia |
| | | Report | Bouchouk x 2 Kermali x 2 Mekhloufi x 4 Mazouz | Stadium: Stade Géo André; Attendance: 3,000 |

=== 1960s ===
| 22 May 1960 Friendly | Italy C | 4–0 | Tunisia | Reggio Calabria, Italy |
| | | | | Stadium: Stadio Oreste Granillo |

| 17 July 1960 Friendly | Czechoslovakia B | 4–0 | Tunisia | Prague, Czechoslovakia |
| | | | | Stadium: Great Strahov Stadium |

| 27 November 1960 Friendly | Tunisia | 2–3 | Bulgaria B | Tunis, Tunisia |
| | | | | Stadium: Stade Géo André |

| 23 December 1960 Friendly | Iraq Military | 3–2 | Tunisia | Baghdad, Iraq |
| | | | | Stadium: Baghdad Stadium |

| 13 May 1962 Friendly | Tunisia | 2–0 | Britain Military | Tunis, Tunisia |
| | | | | Stadium: Stade Géo André |

| 12 July 1963 Friendly | Neftçi PFK | 7–0 | Tunisia | Baku, Soviet Union |
| | | | | Stadium: Tofiq Bahramov Stadium |

| 20 July 1963 Friendly | Ararat Yerevan | 2–2 | Tunisia | Yerevan, Soviet Union |
| | | | | Stadium: Dinamo Stadium |

| 14 September 1963 Friendly | Palermo | 0–0 | Tunisia | Palermo, Italy |
| | | | | Stadium: Stadio La Favorita |

| 17 September 1963 Friendly | Saint-Étienne | 0–0 | Tunisia | Saint-Étienne, France |
| | | | | Stadium: Stade Geoffroy-Guichard |

| 20 September 1963 Friendly | OGC Nice | 1–0 | Tunisia | Nice, France |
| | | | | Stadium: Stade du Ray |

| 13 April 1964 Friendly | Tunisia | 0–0 | Toulouse | Tunis, Tunisia |
| | | | | Stadium: Stade Chedly Zouiten |

| 17 December 1964 Friendly | Tunisia | 1–0 | First Vienna | Tunis, Tunisia |
| | | | | Stadium: Stade Chedly Zouiten |

| 21 February 1965 Friendly | Tunisia | 0–0 | Ferencvárosi | Tunis, Tunisia |
| | | | | Stadium: Stade Chedly Zouiten |

| 24 October 1965 Friendly | Tunisia | 1–0 | Dinamo Minsk | Tunis, Tunisia |
| | | | | Stadium: Stade Chedly Zouiten |

| 27 October 1965 Friendly | Tunisia | 1–2 | Dinamo Minsk | Tunis, Tunisia |
| | | | | Stadium: Stade Chedly Zouiten |

| 5 November 1965 Friendly | Tunisia | 2–3 | OGC Nice | Tunis, Tunisia |
| | | | | Stadium: Stade Chedly Zouiten |

| 29 January 1966 Friendly | Tunisia | 2–2 | Spartak Moscow | Tunis, Tunisia |
| | | | | Stadium: Stade Chedly Zouiten |

| 25 February 1966 Friendly | Tunisia | 1–1 | Dinamo București | Tunis, Tunisia |
| | | | | Stadium: Stade Chedly Zouiten |

| 27 February 1966 Friendly | Tunisia | 0–1 | Dinamo București | Tunis, Tunisia |
| | | | | Stadium: Stade Chedly Zouiten |

| 20 March 1966 Friendly | Tunisia | 2–1 | Dynamo Moscow | Tunis, Tunisia |
| | | | | Stadium: Stade Chedly Zouiten |

| 25 July 1966 Friendly | Köln Army | 3–2 | Tunisia | Köln, West Germany |
| | | | | Stadium: Müngersdorfer Stadion |

| 4 December 1966 Friendly | Bohemians Prague | 3–1 | Tunisia | Prague, Czechoslovakia |
| | | | | Stadium: Stadion SK Prosek |

| 30 December 1966 Friendly | Tunisia | 0–0 | FC Karl-Marx-Stadt | Tunis, Tunisia |
| | | | | Stadium: Stade Chedly Zouiten |

| 1 January 1967 Friendly | Tunisia | 1–0 | FC Karl-Marx-Stadt | Tunis, Tunisia |
| | | | | Stadium: Stade Chedly Zouiten |

| 29 January 1967 Friendly | Utrecht | 2–0 | Tunisia | Utrecht, Netherlands |
| | | | | Stadium: Stadion Galgenwaard |

| 18 June 1967 Friendly | Tunisia | 0–2 | Olympique Marseille | Tunis, Tunisia |
| | | | Casolari 26', 73' | Stadium: Stade El Menzah; Attendance: 5,000 |

| 1 August 1967 Friendly | Olympique Marseille | 4–2 | Tunisia | Marseille, France |
| | Massip 20'; Guéniche 30'; Invernizzi 42'; Joseph 80' | | Lahmar 25'; Machouche 45' | Stadium: Stade Vélodrome; Attendance: 4,300 |

| 6 August 1967 Friendly | Avignon | 0–2 | Tunisia | Avignon, France |
| | | | | Stadium: Parc des Sports |

| 9 August 1967 Friendly | Nîmes | 3–0 | Tunisia | Nîmes, France |
| | | | | Stadium: Stade Jean-Bouin |

| 13 August 1967 Friendly | Stade français | 0–2 | Tunisia | Paris, France |
| | | | | Stadium: Stade Géo André |

| 20 August 1967 Friendly | Zenit Leningrad | 3–0 | Tunisia | Moscow, Soviet Union |
| | | | | Stadium: Luzhniki Stadium |

| 25 August 1967 Friendly | Soviet Union Military | 2–1 | Tunisia | Moscow, Soviet Union |
| | | | | Stadium: Luzhniki Stadium |

| 13 January 1968 Friendly | Viktoria Žižkov | 0–0 | Tunisia | Prague, Czechoslovakia |
| | | | | Stadium: FK Viktoria Stadion |

| 14 January 1968 Friendly | Lokomotiv Sofia | 2–2 | Tunisia | Prague, Czechoslovakia |
| | | | | Stadium: FK Viktoria Stadion |

| 18 February 1968 Friendly | Venezia FC | 0–2 | Tunisia | Venice, Italy |
| | | | | Stadium: Stadio Pier Luigi Penzo |

| 27 March 1968 Friendly | Nantes | 3–0 | Tunisia | Nantes, France |
| | | | | Stadium: Stade Marcel-Saupin |

| 12 May 1968 Friendly | Nîmes | 2–0 | Tunisia | Nîmes, France |
| | | | | Stadium: Stade Jean-Bouin |

| 15 October 1968 Friendly | Tunisia | 1–0 | Olympique Marseille | Tunis, Tunisia |
| | | | | Stadium: Stade El Menzah |

| 20 November 1968 Friendly | Tunisia | 3–0 | Ismaily | Kinshasa, Congo |
| | | | | Stadium: Stade 20 May |

| 26 November 1968 Friendly | Tunisia | 0–0 | Bonsucesso | Kinshasa, Congo |
| | | | | Stadium: Stade 20 May |

| 31 January 1969 Friendly | Tunisia | 1–1 | CSKA Sofia | Tunis, Tunisia |
| | | | | Stadium: Stade Chedly Zouiten |

| 26 February 1969 Friendly | Tunisia | 0–1 | Valenciennes | Tunis, Tunisia |
| | | | | Stadium: Stade Chedly Zouiten |

| 17 April 1969 Friendly | Pays d'Aix FC | 1–2 | Tunisia | Aix-en-Provence, France |
| | | | | Stadium: Stade Georges-Carcassonne |

| 4 June 1969 Friendly | Tunisia | 1–3 | Italy Military | Tunis, Tunisia |
| | | | | Stadium: Stade El Menzah |

| 10 June 1969 Friendly | Tunisia | 4–1 | Pays d'Aix FC | Tunis, Tunisia |
| | | | | Stadium: Stade El Menzah |

| 22 June 1969 Friendly | Tunisia | 1–1 | Juventus | Tunis, Tunisia |
| | | | | Stadium: Stade El Menzah |

| 28 December 1969 Friendly | Venezia FC | 5–1 | Tunisia | Venice, Italy |
| | | | | Stadium: Stadio Pier Luigi Penzo |

=== 1970s ===
| 24 April 1970 Friendly | Tunisia | 1–1 | CSKA Sofia | Tunis, Tunisia |
| | | | | Stadium: Stade El Menzah |

| 26 April 1970 Friendly | Tunisia | 0–0 | Algeria U-23 | Tunis, Tunisia |
| | | | | Stadium: Stade El Menzah |

| 11 November 1970 Friendly | Tunisia | 0–3 | Italy Military | Tunis, Tunisia |
| | | | | Stadium: Stade El Menzah |

| 13 December 1970 Friendly | Austria Salzburg | 2–2 | Tunisia | Salzburg, Austria |
| | | | | Stadium: Austria Salzburg Stadium |

| 23 December 1970 Friendly | VfB Stuttgart | 1–1 | Tunisia | Stuttgart, West Germany |
| | | | | Stadium: Neckarstadion |

| 1 January 1971 Friendly | Al Ahli | 0–2 | Tunisia | Jeddah, Saudi Arabia |
| | | | | Stadium: Prince Abdullah Al Faisal Stadium |

| 8 January 1971 Friendly | Al Nasr | 0–2 | Tunisia | Riyadh, Saudi Arabia |
| | | | | Stadium: Prince Faisal bin Fahd Stadium |

| 14 February 1971 Friendly | Tunisia | 0–1 | ADO Den Haag | Tunis, Tunisia |
| | | | | Stadium: Stade El Menzah |

| 11 May 1971 Friendly | Tunisia | 2–2 | Coventry City | Tunis, Tunisia |
| | | | | Stadium: Stade El Menzah |

| 18 September 1971 Friendly | Austria Salzburg | 3–2 | Tunisia | Salzburg, Austria |
| | | | | Stadium: Austria Salzburg Stadium |

| 22 September 1971 Friendly | Hessen Kassel | 5–3 | Tunisia | Kassel, West Germany |
| | | | | Stadium: Auestadion |

| 25 September 1971 Friendly | TSG Backnang | 2–4 | Tunisia | Backnang, West Germany |
| | | | | Stadium: Etzwiesenstadion |

| 28 September 1971 Friendly | Grazer AK | 1–3 | Tunisia | Graz, Austria |
| | | | | Stadium: Liebenauer Stadium |

| 11 July 1974 1974 Iran International Tournament | Tunisia | 3–3 | FC Brașov | Tehran, Iran |
| | Dhiab 9'; Habita 54', 90+1' | | Tresko 28'; Matsko 40'; Serino 41' | Stadium: Amjadiyeh Stadium; Attendance: 20,000; Referee: Mohammad Salehi (Iran) |

| 14 July 1974 1974 Iran International Tournament | Iran B | 0–0 | Tunisia | Tehran, Iran |
| | | | | Stadium: Amjadiyeh Stadium; Attendance: 15,000; Referee: Tofiq Bahramov (Soviet Union) |

| 16 July 1974 1974 Iran International Tournament | Zagłębie Sosnowiec | 2–0 | Tunisia | Tehran, Iran |
| | Caneski 26'; Mazor 64' | | | Stadium: Amjadiyeh Stadium; Attendance: 12,000; Referee: Reza Heydari (Iran) |

| 3 October 1974 1974 Kuneitra Cup | Tunisia | 1–0 | NA Hussein Dey | Damascus, Syria |
| | Goubantini | | | Stadium: Abbasiyyin Stadium |

| 22 January 1975 Friendly | Bulgaria U-20 | 1–1 | Tunisia | Sofia, Bulgaria |
| | | | | Stadium: Vasil Levski National Stadium |

| 29 January 1975 Friendly | OFK Beograd | 1–3 | Tunisia | Belgrade, Yugoslavia |
| | | | | Stadium: Omladinski Stadium |

| 5 February 1975 Friendly | OFK Beograd | 0–0 | Tunisia | Belgrade, Yugoslavia |
| | | | | Stadium: Omladinski Stadium |

| 12 February 1975 Friendly | Tunisia | 1–1 | Levski Sofia | Tunis, Tunisia |
| | | | | Stadium: Stade El Menzah |

| 6 December 1975 Friendly | Tunisia | 3–1 | Esbjerg fB | Sousse, Tunisia |
| | | | | Stadium: Stade Olympique de Sousse |

| 20 October 1976 Friendly | Tunisia | 1–2 | Olympique Marseille | Tunis, Tunisia |
| | Ouada | | Nogués 25', 35' | Stadium: Stade El Menzah; Attendance: 10,000 |

| 29 December 1976 Friendly | Tunisia | 2–1 | OGC Nice | Tunis, Tunisia |
| | | | | Stadium: Stade El Menzah |

| 13 September 1977 Friendly | AS Monaco | 0–1 | Tunisia | Monaco, Monaco |
| | | | | Stadium: Stade Louis II |

| 16 September 1977 Friendly | AS Cannes | 1–1 | Tunisia | Cannes, France |
| | | | | Stadium: Stade Pierre de Coubertin |

| 19 November 1977 Friendly | Tunisia | 1–0 | Hertha Berlin | Tunis, Tunisia |
| | | | | Stadium: Stade El Menzah |

| 5 December 1977 Friendly | Tunisia | 2–1 | Žalgiris Vilnius | Tunis, Tunisia |
| | | | | Stadium: Stade El Menzah |

| 1 March 1978 Friendly | AS Cannes | 2–3 | Tunisia | Cannes, France |
| | | | | Stadium: Stade Pierre de Coubertin |

| 5 April 1978 Friendly | Hungary | 2–2 * | Tunisia | Budapest, Hungary |
| | | | | Stadium: Ferenc Puskás Stadium |

| 19 April 1978 Friendly | FK Sarajevo | 0–0 | Tunisia | Sarajevo, Yugoslavia |
| | | | | Stadium: Koševo City Stadium |

| 12 May 1978 Friendly | Ponte Preta | 1–0 | Tunisia | Paris, France |
| | | | | Stadium: Paris Stadium |

| 20 December 1978 Friendly | Damascus Team | 0–5 | Tunisia | Damascus, Syria |
| | | | | Stadium: Abbasiyyin Stadium |

| 9 January 1979 Friendly | Anderlecht | 2–1 | Tunisia | Toulouse, France |
| | | | | Stadium: Stadium de Toulouse |

| 14 February 1979 Friendly | Tunisia | 1–2 | Dinamo Tbilisi | Tunis, Tunisia |
| | | | | Stadium: Stade Chedly Zouiten |

| 3 March 1979 Friendly | Tunisia | 1–2 | Bayern Munich | Tunis, Tunisia |
| | | | | Stadium: Stade El Menzah |

| 14 March 1979 Friendly | Tunisia | 1–0 | AS Cannes | Tunis, Tunisia |
| | | | | Stadium: Stade El Menzah |

| 6 August 1979 Friendly | Romania Academy | 4–0 | Tunisia | Bucharest, Romania |
| | | | | Stadium: National Stadium |

| 7 August 1979 Friendly | Romania Academy | 2–3 | Tunisia | Bucharest, Romania |
| | | | | Stadium: National Stadium |

| 8 August 1979 Friendly | Argeș Pitești | 1–0 | Tunisia | Bucharest, Romania |
| | | | | Stadium: National Stadium |

| 9 August 1979 Friendly | ISCM Bucharest | 1–1 | Tunisia | Bucharest, Romania |
| | | | | Stadium: National Stadium |

| 10 August 1979 Friendly | Automatica | 3–2 | Tunisia | Bucharest, Romania |
| | | | | Stadium: National Stadium |

| 11 August 1979 Friendly | Farul Constanța | 2–3 | Tunisia | Bucharest, Romania |
| | | | | Stadium: National Stadium |

| 12 August 1979 Friendly | Rapid București | 1–2 | Tunisia | Bucharest, Romania |
| | | | | Stadium: National Stadium |

| 17 August 1979 Friendly | Ancona-Matelica | 1–1 | Tunisia | Ancona, Italy |
| | | | | Stadium: Stadio Dorico |

| 18 August 1979 Friendly | Delfino Pescara | 0–1 | Tunisia | Pescara, Italy |
| | | | | Stadium: Stadio Adriatico |

| 5 September 1979 Friendly | CSKA Sofia | 2–1 | Tunisia | Sofia, Bulgaria |
| | | | | Stadium: Narodna Armia |

| 8 September 1979 Friendly | Akademik Sofia | 4–0 | Tunisia | Sofia, Bulgaria |
| | | | | Stadium: Stadion Akademik |

| 12 September 1979 Friendly | Lokomotiv Sofia | 0–1 | Tunisia | Sofia, Bulgaria |
| | | | | Stadium: Stadion Lokomotiv |

| 18 September 1979 Friendly | NK Omiš | 1–3 | Tunisia | Omiš, Yugoslavia |
| | | | | Stadium: Anđelko Marušić Ferata Stadium |

| 5 December 1979 Friendly | Tunisia | 0–1 | Southampton | Tunis, Tunisia |
| | | | | Stadium: Stade El Menzah |

| 19 December 1979 Friendly | Tunisia | 1–1 | CSKA Sofia | Tunis, Tunisia |
| | | | | Stadium: Stade El Menzah |

=== 1980s ===
| 23 May 1980 Friendly | FK Sarajevo | 1–1 | Tunisia | Sarajevo, Yugoslavia |
| | | | | Stadium: Koševo City Stadium |

| 30 May 1980 Friendly | AJ Auxerre | 2–0 | Tunisia | Auxerre, France |
| | | | | Stadium: Stade de l'Abbé-Deschamps |

| 3 June 1980 Friendly | ASP Vauban | 2–1 | Tunisia | Strasbourg, France |
| | | | | Stadium: Stade Émile-Stahl |

| 19 June 1980 Friendly | Tunisia | 2–1 | FK Sarajevo | Tunis, Tunisia |
| | | | | Stadium: Stade El Menzah |

| 1 April 1981 Friendly | Tunisia | 1–3 | Middlesbrough | Tunis, Tunisia |
| | | | | Stadium: Stade El Menzah |

| 30 May 1981 Friendly | Tunisia | 2–1 | AS Monaco | Tunis, Tunisia |
| | | | | Stadium: Stade El Menzah |

| 20 November 1981 Friendly | Tunisia | 0–0 | Pakhtakor Tashkent | Tunis, Tunisia |
| | | | | Stadium: Stade El Menzah |

| 27 December 1981 Friendly | United Arab Emirates U-20 | 1–2 | Tunisia | Al Ain, United Arab Emirates |
| | | | | Stadium: Khalifa bin Zayed Stadium |

| 24 February 1982 Friendly | Rome Team | 1–1 | Tunisia | Rome, Italy |
| | | | | Stadium: Stadio Olimpico |

| 23 October 1982 Friendly | Stoke City | 1–1 | Tunisia | Stoke-on-Trent, England |
| | | | | Stadium: Victoria Ground |

| 31 October 1982 Friendly | AJ Auxerre | 1–0 | Tunisia | Auxerre, France |
| | | | | Stadium: Stade de l'Abbé-Deschamps |

| 29 July 1983 Friendly | Mladá Boleslav | 2–1 | Tunisia | Mladá Boleslav, Czechoslovakia |
| | | | | Stadium: Lokotrans Aréna |

| 1 August 1983 Friendly | FK Teplice | 5–0 | Tunisia | Teplice, Czechoslovakia |
| | | | | Stadium: Na Stínadlech |

| 4 August 1983 Friendly | Erzgebirge Aue | 1–0 | Tunisia | Aue, East Germany |
| | | | | Stadium: Erzgebirgsstadion |

| 6 August 1983 Friendly | Thuringe Weida | 0–1 | Tunisia | Weida, East Germany |
| | | | | Stadium: Red Hill Stadium |

| 8 August 1983 Friendly | FSV Zwickau | 0–1 | Tunisia | Zwickau, East Germany |
| | | | | Stadium: Westsachsenstadion |

| 8 August 1984 Friendly | FC Köln II | 1–1 | Tunisia | Zwickau, East Germany |
| | | | | Stadium: Westsachsenstadion |

| 23 August 1984 Friendly | VfB Wissen | 2–0 | Tunisia | Wissen, West Germany |
| | | | | Stadium: Dr.-Grosse-Siegstadion |

| 27 August 1984 Friendly | GSV Moers | 0–1 | Tunisia | Moers, West Germany |
| | | | | Stadium: Filder Benden Stadium |

| 29 January 1985 Friendly | Tunisia | 1–1 | West Bromwich Albion | Tunis, Tunisia |
| | | | | Stadium: Stade Chedly Zouiten |

| 14 May 1985 Friendly | Eintracht Frankfurt | 2–1 | Tunisia | Frankfurt, West Germany |
| | | | | Stadium: Waldstadion |

| 18 September 1985 Friendly | Heerenveen | 2–5 | Tunisia | Heerenveen, Netherlands |
| | | | | Stadium: Old Abe Lenstra Stadion |

| 23 September 1985 Friendly | North Netherlands | 3–2 | Tunisia | Groningen, Netherlands |
| | | | | Stadium: Stadion Oosterpark |

| 25 September 1985 Friendly | FC Groningen | 0–0 | Tunisia | Groningen, Netherlands |
| | | | | Stadium: Stadion Oosterpark |

| 7 December 1986 Friendly | Tunisia | 1–0 | Saint-Étienne | Tunis, Tunisia |
| | | | | Stadium: Stade El Menzah |

| 22 January 1987 Friendly | Tunisia | 1–0 | Torpedo Moscow | Tunis, Tunisia |
| | | | | Stadium: Stade Chedly Zouiten |

| 29 January 1987 Friendly | Tunisia | 1–1 | Alemannia Aachen | Tunis, Tunisia |
| | | | | Stadium: Stade Chedly Zouiten |

| 11 February 1987 Friendly | Tunisia | 1–1 | Young Boys | Sousse, Tunisia |
| | | | | Stadium: Stade Olympique de Sousse |

| 19 February 1987 Friendly | Stade Rennais | 2–3 | Tunisia | Rennes, France |
| | | | | Stadium: Roazhon Park |

| 19 March 1987 Friendly | Tunisia | 0–3 | Lyngby Boldklub | Tunis, Tunisia |
| | | | | Stadium: Stade Chedly Zouiten |

| 23 July 1987 Friendly | Luzenac AP | 2–5 | Tunisia | Luzenac, France |
| | | | | Stadium: Stade Paul Fédou |

| 25 July 1987 Friendly | Canet Roussillon | 2–1 | Tunisia | Canet-en-Roussillon, France |
| | | | | Stadium: Stade Saint-Michel |

| 26 July 1987 Friendly | Andorra | 1–0 | Tunisia | Andorra la Vella, Andorra |
| | | | | Stadium: Estadi Comunal d'Andorra la Vella |

| 26 September 1987 Friendly | Tunisia | 2–1 | Hallescher FC | Tunis, Tunisia |
| | | | | Stadium: Stade El Menzah |

| 6 January 1988 Friendly | Watford | 2–1 | Tunisia | Watford, England |
| | | | | Stadium: Vicarage Road |

| 10 January 1988 Friendly | MSV Duisburg | 2–4 | Tunisia | Duisburg, West Germany |
| | | | | Stadium: Wedaustadion |

| 30 August 1988 Friendly | OFK Beograd | 3–0 | Tunisia | Belgrade, Yugoslavia |
| | | | | Stadium: Omladinski Stadium |

| 1 September 1988 Friendly | Železničar | 1–1 | Tunisia | Belgrade, Yugoslavia |
| | | | | Stadium: Omladinski Stadium |

| 5 September 1988 Friendly | Tunisia | 0–0 | Lille | Tunis, Tunisia |
| | | | | Stadium: Stade El Menzah |

| 6 June 1989 Friendly | Blue Eagles | 1–3 | Tunisia | Lilongwe, Malawi |
| | | | | Stadium: Nankhaka Stadium |

| 28 July 1989 Friendly | Thouars Foot | 0–3 | Tunisia | Thouars, France |
| | | | | Stadium: Stade du Grand Bournais |

| 30 July 1989 Friendly | Villeneuve-Loubet | 2–7 | Tunisia | Villeneuve-Loubet, France |
| | | | | Stadium: Stade de Villeneuve-Loubet |

| 2 August 1989 Friendly | Royan Atlantique | 2–8 | Tunisia | Royan, France |
| | | | | Stadium: Stade de Royan |

| 9 August 1989 Friendly | Atlético Marcilla | 0–4 | Tunisia | Marcilla, Spain |
| | | | | Stadium: Estadio de Marcilla |

| 29 September 1989 Friendly | Joinville-le-Pont | 0–3 | Tunisia | Joinville-le-Pont, France |
| | | | | Stadium: Stade de Joinville-le-Pont |

| 30 September 1989 Friendly | Joinville-le-Pont | 0–2 | Tunisia | Joinville-le-Pont, France |
| | | | | Stadium: Stade de Joinville-le-Pont |

| 1 October 1989 Friendly | CE Europa | 0–3 | Tunisia | Barcelona, Spain |
| | | | | Stadium: Nou Sardenya |

| 3 October 1989 Friendly | Racing Paris | 0–1 | Tunisia | Paris, France |
| | | | | Stadium: Stade Yves-du-Manoir |

| 4 October 1989 Friendly | AS Sogara | 0–4 | Tunisia | Clairefontaine-en-Yvelines, France |
| | | | | Stadium: Stade de Clairefontaine-en-Yvelines |

| 5 October 1989 Friendly | INF Clairefontaine | 0–2 | Tunisia | Clairefontaine-en-Yvelines, France |
| | | | | Stadium: Stade de Clairefontaine-en-Yvelines |

| 6 October 1989 Friendly | INF Clairefontaine | 3–4 | Tunisia | Clairefontaine-en-Yvelines, France |
| | | | | Stadium: Stade de Clairefontaine-en-Yvelines |

| 13 November 1989 Friendly | Pisa SC | 0–3 | Tunisia | Pisa, Italy |
| | | | | Stadium: Arena Garibaldi |

=== 1990s ===
| 9 May 1990 Friendly | Tunisia | 0–0 | St Patrick's Athletic | Tunis, Tunisia |
| | | | | Stadium: Stade El Menzah |

| 25 July 1990 Friendly | Saint-Sever | 1–1 | Tunisia | Saint-Sever, France |
| | | | | Stadium: Stade Louis-Lafaurie |

| 30 July 1990 Friendly | Chamois Niortais | 0–0 | Tunisia | Niort, France |
| | | | | Stadium: Stade René Gaillard |

| 12 July 1991 Friendly | SC Toulon | 2–1 | Tunisia | Toulon, France |
| | | | | Stadium: Stade de Bon Rencontre |

| 17 July 1991 Friendly | Olympique Alès | 1–2 | Tunisia | Alès, France |
| | | | | Stadium: Stade Pierre Pibarot |

| 19 July 1991 Friendly | Olympique Alès | 1–0 | Tunisia | Alès, France |
| | | | | Stadium: Stade Pierre Pibarot |

| 5 November 1991 7th November Cup | Tunisia | 8–2 | Ararat Yerevan | Tunis, Tunisia |
| | | | | Stadium: Stade El Menzah |

| 7 November 1991 7th November Cup | Tunisia | 3–1 | Luton Town | Tunis, Tunisia |
| | | | | Stadium: Stade El Menzah |

| 17 July 1992 Friendly | Pisa SC | 3–1 | Tunisia | Pisa, Italy |
| | | | | Stadium: Arena Garibaldi |

| 13 August 1992 Friendly | Brescia | 1–2 | Tunisia | Brescia, Italy |
| | | | | Stadium: Stadio Mario Rigamonti |

| 11 February 1993 Friendly | Kaiserslautern | 0–1 | Tunisia | Kaiserslautern, Germany |
| | | | | Stadium: Fritz-Walter-Stadion |

| 6 October 1993 Friendly | Antwerp | 0–1 | Tunisia | Antwerp, Belgium |
| | | | | Stadium: Bosuilstadion |

| 19 November 1993 Friendly | AS Monaco | 1–0 | Tunisia | Monaco, Monaco |
| | | | | Stadium: Stade Louis II |

| 24 February 1995 Friendly | Tunisia | 1–1 | Ferencváros | Tunis, Tunisia |
| | | | | Stadium: Stade El Menzah |

| 9 July 1995 Friendly | Olympique Lyon | 2–0 | Tunisia | Lyon, France |
| | | | | Stadium: Stade de Gerland |

| 30 December 1995 Friendly | Tunisia | 6–1 | Olympique Marseille | Tunis, Tunisia |
| | | | | Stadium: Stade El Menzah |

| 9 May 1998 Friendly | Vicenza | 1–0 | Tunisia | Vicenza, Italy |
| | | | | Stadium: Stadio Romeo Menti |

| 16 May 1998 Friendly | Croix-de-Savoie | 0–3 | Tunisia | Haute-Savoie, France |
| | | | | Stadium: Stade Joseph-Moynat |

| 17 January 1999 Friendly | RSC Anderlecht | 0–1 | Tunisia | Anderlecht, Belgium |
| | | | Kanzari 80' | Stadium: Constant Vanden Stock Stadium |

| 1999 Friendly | Barcelona B | 0–1 | Tunisia | Barcelona, Spain |
| | | | | Stadium: Mini Estadi |

| 1999 Friendly | Tarsia Team | 1–0 | Tunisia | Tarsia, Italy |
| | | | | Stadium: Stadio di Tarsia |

| 1999 Friendly | Wavre Sports | 1–6 | Tunisia | Wavre, Belgium |
| | | | | Stadium: Stade Justin Peeters |

| 13 November 1999 Friendly | Tunisia | 1–3 | Inter Milan | Tunis, Tunisia |
| | Sellimi | | | Stadium: Stade El Menzah |

=== 2000s ===
| 5 January 2000 Friendly | UD Fuengirola | 1–8 | Tunisia | Fuengirola, Spain |
| | | | | Stadium: Estadio Municipal de Fuengirola |

| 14 January 2000 Friendly | Ajax Amsterdam | 1–2 | Tunisia | Amsterdam, Netherlands |
| | | | | Stadium: Amsterdam Arena |

| 18 January 2000 Friendly | Ghana | 2–0 ** | Tunisia | Accra, Ghana |
| | | | | Stadium: Accra Sports Stadium |

| 19 February 2001 Friendly | FC Volendam | 0–5 | Tunisia | Volendam, Netherlands |
| | | | | Stadium: Kras Stadion |

| 21 February 2001 Friendly | FC Volendam | 1–3 | Tunisia | Volendam, Netherlands |
| | | | | Stadium: Kras Stadion |

| 21 March 2001 Friendly | AS Monaco | 0–0 | Tunisia | Monaco, Monaco |
| | | | | Stadium: Stade Louis II |

| 1 May 2001 Friendly | Saint-Denis FC | 0–3 | Tunisia | Saint-Denis, Réunion |
| | | | | Stadium: Stade Jean-Ivoula |

| 27 December 2001 Friendly | Andalusia | 3–3 | Tunisia | Seville, Spain |
| 22:00 CET | Jesuli 33'; Tristán 65' (pen.), 70' | | Boukadida 56'; Badra 75' (pen.); Baya 85' | Stadium: Estadio de La Cartuja; Attendance: 20,000 |

| 15 January 2002 Friendly | Tunisia | 2–1 | FC Köln | Tunis, Tunisia |
| | Jaidi; Zabi | | | Stadium: Stade El Menzah |

| 17 January 2002 Friendly | Tunisia | 0–0 | Saturn Ramenskoye | Tunis, Tunisia |
| | | | | Stadium: Stade El Menzah |

| 10 May 2002 Friendly | FC Metz | 3–4 | Tunisia | Metz, France |
| | | | | Stadium: Stade Saint-Symphorien |

| 13 May 2002 Friendly | CS Sedan | 0–3 | Tunisia | Sedan, France |
| | | | | Stadium: Stade Louis Dugauguez |

| 16 May 2002 Friendly | Oita Trinita | 2–1 | Tunisia | Ōita, Japan |
| | | | | Stadium: Showa Denko Dome Oita |

| 23 May 2002 Friendly | Gamba Osaka | 3–0 | Tunisia | Osaka, Japan |
| | Nakayama 20'; Futagawa 45'; Oguro 76' | | | Stadium: Expo '70 Commemorative Stadium |

| 24 May 2006 Friendly | FC Serrières | 0–2 | Tunisia | Colombier, Switzerland |
| | | | Haggui 8'; Yahia 43' | Stadium: Stade du Littoral; Attendance: 600; Referee: Daniel Käser (Switzerland) |

| 25 May 2006 Friendly | FC Colombier | 0–4 | Tunisia | Couvet, Switzerland |
| | | | Jemâa 43'; Santos 50', 67'; Jaïdi 63' | Stadium: Stade de la Léchère; Attendance: 300; Referee: Bruno Grossen (Switzerland) |

=== 2010s ===
| 28 December 2011 Friendly | Basque Country | 0–2 | Tunisia | Bilbao, Spain |
| 20:45 CET | | Report | Msakni 66'; Chedli 82' | Stadium: San Mamés Stadium; Attendance: 35,000; Referee: Eduardo Iturralde González (Spain) |

| 30 December 2011 2011 Catalonia International Trophy | Catalonia | 0–0 | Tunisia | Barcelona, Spain |
| 19:00 | | Report | | Stadium: Estadi Olímpic Lluís Companys; Attendance: 36,545; Referee: Alfonso Álvarez (Spain) |

| 28 December 2016 2016 Catalonia International Trophy | Catalonia | 3–3 (2–4 p) | Tunisia | Girona, Spain |
| 20:00 | Gerard 35'; S. García 69'; Verdú 79' | Report | Msakni 9', 30', 67' | Stadium: Estadi Montilivi; Attendance: 8,311; Referee: Alfonso Álvarez (Spain) |
| | Penalties |
| | Verdú (penalty missed); Víctor Álvarez (penalty missed); Vázquez (penalty scored); Riera (penalty scored) | | (penalty scored) Sassi; (penalty scored) Dhaouadi; (penalty scored) Bguir; (penalty missed) Azouni; (penalty scored) Khalifa |

| 30 December 2016 Friendly | Basque Country | 3–1 | Tunisia | Bilbao, Spain |
| 20:30 | Illarramendi 6'; Aduriz 19'; Oyarzabal 44' | Report 1 Report 2 | Sassi 16' | Stadium: San Mamés Stadium; Attendance: 15,000; Referee: Ricardo de Burgos Bengoetxea (Spain) |

| 7 January 2018 Friendly | Al-Duhail | 1–0 | Tunisia | Doha, Qatar |
| | Msakni 88' | | | Stadium: Abdullah bin Khalifa Stadium |

| 15 January 2018 Friendly | Mesaimeer | 0–6 | Tunisia | Doha, Qatar |
| | | | Ben Sghaïer 7'; Marzouki 20'; Badri 37', 51'; Ben Larbi 63'; Khalil 78' | Stadium: Abdullah bin Khalifa Stadium |

=== 2020s ===
| 16 November 2022 Friendly | Iran | 0–2 *** | Tunisia | Doha, Qatar |
| 16:00 UTC+3 | | Report | Sliti 62' (pen.); Abdi 69' | Stadium: Al Rayyan SC Training Stadium; Attendance: 0 |

== Notes ==
- * Match of two Half-times of 30 minutes each.
- ** Match of three Half-times of 35 minutes each.
- *** Number of substitutions exceeds the limit of FIFA rules.
