= Amoroso =

Amoroso may refer to:

== Music ==
- Amoroso (album), an album by João Gilberto released in 1977
- Rondo amoroso, Op. 14, No. 7, a piano piece written by Harald Sæverud

== People ==
- Amoroso, an Italian surname
- Amoroso Katamsi, Indonesian actor and military physician
- Márcio Amoroso, Brazilian international football player

== Other uses ==
- Amoroso's Baking Company, a Philadelphia-based bakery
- Amoroso distribution, a generalized variant of the generalized gamma distribution
- Renato Amoroso, a character in Malèna
- A Spanish word for a sweetened oloroso sherry
- The German name for the Pokémon Omastar

== See also ==
- Amorosi (disambiguation)
- Amoruso, a surname
