= HoagieNation =

Music festival hosted in Philadelphia

- Locations: Philadelphia, Pennsylvania
- Years active: 2017–2018, 2020-
- Founders: Daryl Hall and John Oates
- Website: hoagienation.com

The HoagieNation Festival was started in 2017 by Philadelphia's own pop rock duo, Hall & Oates, as a "celebration of everything Philly". Being described by Daryl Hall, HoagieNation is "a wonderful and colorful place where the citizens are united by a love of cold meat and Amoroso's rolls". Meanwhile, John Oates described Philly as being "famous for a lot of things" with the highlights being "the amazing music" and "the hoagie", which the duo were "[putting] it all together". The festival was recognized by Mayor of Philadelphia Jim Kenney, who said that "Daryl and John hold a special place in the hearts of Philadelphia music fans", and that "we are extremely excited that they are launching their first-ever curated festival back where it all began, right here in Philadelphia". The festival has featured many artists, in addition to Hall & Oates, that are local to Philadelphia, including G. Love & Special Sauce, Tommy Conwell & The Young Rumblers, the Soul Survivors, and many others.

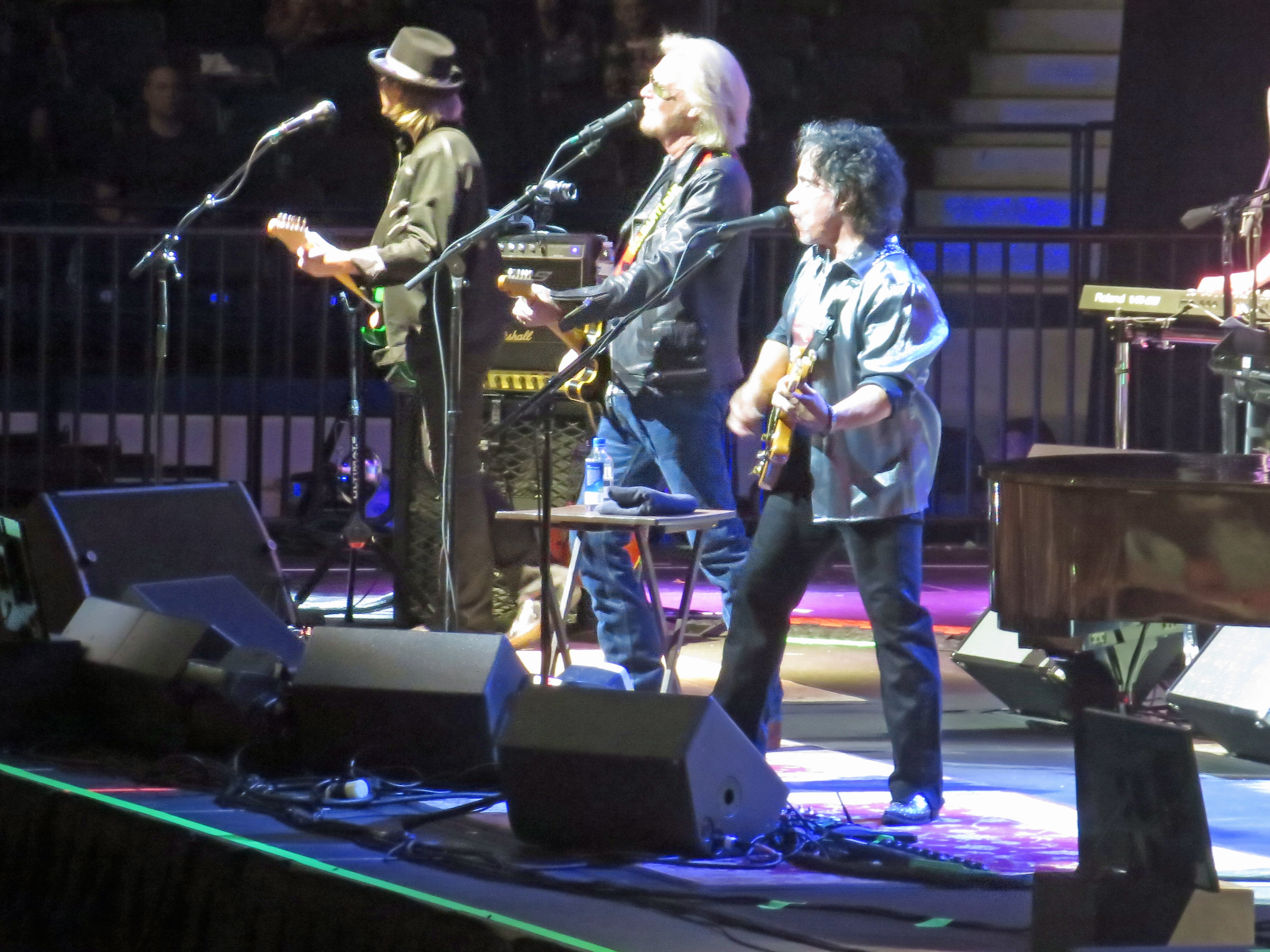
Founders of the event Daryl Hall and John Oates performing live in 2017 in Rosemont, Illinois

The festival returned in 2018, which would be the final year for the festival at Festival Pier at Penn's Landing. It was announced in 2019 that Festival Pier was "on sabbatical", according to Geoff Gordon, of Live Nation, which many took as a sign the venue was closed for good. In 2019, HoagieNation took a hiatus, as it was posted on their official social media that the festival was "taking a little hiatus in 2019 to fine tune our menu, location and explore some new and exciting options for you".

The festival announced their return, with a festival at the Mann Center for the Performing Arts on May 23, 2020. Guests appeared including Daryl Hall & John Oates, Squeeze, Kool & the Gang, The Hooters, Blues Traveler, Low Cut Connie, Melanie Fiona, Natalie Price, the Soul Survivors, and Down North.

Festivities held as part of HogieNation have included a Hoagie Happy Hour sponsored by Dietz & Watson, a WIP Hoagie Eating Contest, a pre-party held the night before the 2018 festival, and visits from many local Philadelphia food trucks and restaurants to serve area food staples.

== Festivals ==
Date	Location	Lineup Included
May 27, 2017	Festival Pier at Penn's Landing	Daryl Hall & John Oates, Tears for Fears, G. Love & Special Sauce, Vivian Green, Marah, Kandace Springs, Son Little, David Uosikkinen's In the Pocket, Allen Stone, Schoolly D, Mutlu
May 26, 2018	Festival Pier at Penn's Landing	Daryl Hall & John Oates, Train, Fitz and The Tantrums, Tommy Conwell & The Young Rumblers, Marty Stuart & His Fabulous Superlatives, Mo Lowda & The Humble, Beano French, Down North
May 23, 2020	Mann Center for the Performing Arts	Daryl Hall & John Oates, Squeeze, Kool & the Gang, The Wailers, Craig Robinson & The Nasty Delicious, Soul Survivors, Down North, DJ Prince Hakim
