= Maksim Shiryayev =

Maksim Shiryayev may refer to:

- Maksim Shiryayev (footballer, born 1975), Russian football player
- Maksim Shiryayev (footballer, born 1995), Russian football player
