= Doronin =

Doronin (Russian: Доронин) is an Erzian and Russian masculine surname originating from the Russian given name Dorofei or Erzianin name Doro. Its feminine counterpart is Doronina.

Notable people with the surname include:

== Doronin ==
- Eduard Doronin (born 1975), Russian football player
- Ivan Doronin (1903–1951), Soviet aircraft pilot and Hero of the Soviet Union
- Marek Doronin (born 1983), Estonian basketball player
- Vladislav Doronin (born 1962), Russian-born billionaire businessman
- Volodymyr Doronin (born 1993), Ukrainian footballer

== Doronina ==
- Elena Doronina (born 1981), Russian bobsledder
- Ksenia Doronina (born 1990), Russian figure skater
- Lidija Doroņina-Lasmane (born 1925), Latvian dissident
- Tatiana Doronina (born 1933), Russian actress
