= Amoruso =

Amoruso is an Italian surname. Notable people with the surname include:

- Nicola Amoruso (born 1974), Italian footballer
- Lorenzo Amoruso (born 1971), Italian footballer
- Luca Amoruso (born 1975), Italian footballer
- Sophia Amoruso (born 1984), American businesswoman

== See also ==
- Amorosi (disambiguation)
- Amoroso (disambiguation)
