= North Down =

North Down can refer to:

- North Down Borough Council, former council in Northern Ireland
- North Down (Assembly constituency) in Northern Ireland
- North Down (Northern Ireland Parliament constituency) in Northern Ireland
- North Down (UK Parliament constituency) in Northern Ireland
- Electoral district of Northern Downs, in Queensland, Australia
- The North Downs, a range of hills in England
- Northdown (album), an album by Psapp
- Northdown, Kent, formerly in Isle of Thanet Rural District, England
- Northdown, Tasmania, Australia

Down North can refer to:

- Down North (band), punk band from Seattle

== See also ==
- Ards and North Down Borough Council, Northern Ireland
