= Rumble (album) =

Studio album by Tommy Conwell and the Young Rumblers
- Released: 1988
- Genre: Rock
- Label: Columbia
- Producer: Rick Chertoff

Tommy Conwell and the Young Rumblers chronology
Walkin' on the Water (1986)	Rumble (1988)	Guitar Trouble (1990)

Rumble is the second album by the American band Tommy Conwell and the Young Rumblers, released in 1988. It was the band's first album for a major label.

The album peaked at No. 103 on the Billboard Top Pop Albums chart. "I'm Not Your Man" peaked at No. 1 on the Billboard Album Rock Tracks chart.

== Production ==
The album was produced by Rick Chertoff. The fellow Philadelphia band the Hooters worked on the album; Jules Shear helped write two songs. Rumble contains four re-recordings of songs that appeared on the band's independent debut album.

== Critical reception ==
Professional ratings
Review scores
Source	Rating
AllMusic	2/5 stars
Chicago Sun-Times	3/4 stars
The Rolling Stone Album Guide	2.5/5 stars

The Washington Post called Conwell "a likable roots-rocker who turns out energetic bar-band music, and the attempt to turn him into something else is misguided at best." The Philadelphia Inquirer determined that "Chertoff, perhaps mindful of the hit-singles potential of some of these songs, might have clipped the engaging guitarist too close to the vest in a few spots, denying Rumble's audience the chance to experience an inventive guitar voice." The St. Petersburg Times deemed the album "a savage, blues-based, booze-soaked rock 'n' roll romp that proves a bar band can graduate to major-label status without letting corporate pressure douse its fiery conviction."

The Boston Globe wrote that Rumble "has a few simplistic rock anthems, but comes alive in its striking ability to merge blues and rock with a near-gospel fire." The Toronto Star concluded that "rootsy and real as the music is, it's just a little too contrived." Comparing Conwell to Bruce Springsteen, The Gazette opined that the frontman needed to develop more "vision, if he hopes to proceed beyond Stray Cats-bar band status." The Chicago Sun-Times thought that "Rumble sometimes sounds like the vinyl equivalent of a Brat Pack film, one of the better ones." The Chicago Tribune listed Rumble as one of the 20 best albums of 1988.

AllMusic called "I'm Not Your Man" "as great a roots rocker as the late '80s produced, and reason enough for the group to get its shot at the big time."

== Track listing ==
No.	Title	Length
1.	"I'm Not Your Man"
2.	"Half a Heart"
3.	"If We Never Meet Again"
4.	"Love's on Fire"
5.	"Workout"
6.	"I Wanna Make You Happy"
7.	"Everything They Say Is True"
8.	"Gonna Breakdown"
9.	"Tell Me What You Want Me to Be"
10.	"Walkin' on the Water"
