= Amoroso (surname) =

Amoroso is an Italian surname. Notable people with the surname include:

- Alessandra Amoroso (born 1986), Italian singer and songwriter
- Alfred Amoroso (born 1950), American business executive
- Anthony Amoroso, Italian–American chef
- Bruno Amoroso (1936–2017), Danish–Italian economist
- Christian Amoroso (born 1976), Italian soccer coach and former player
- Emmanuel Amoroso (1901–1982), Trinidadian reproductive physiologist and developmental biologist
- Franco Amoroso (born 1994), Argentine soccer player
- Giovanni Amoroso (born 1949), Italian judge
- José Amoroso Filho (1937–2022), Brazilian soccer player
- Luigi Amoroso (1886–1965), Italian economist and mathematician
- Márcio Amoroso (born 1974), Brazilian soccer player
- Ryan Amoroso (born 1985), American basketball player
- Roberto Amoroso (1911–1994), Italian producer and screenwriter
- Valerio Amoroso (born 1980), Italian basketball player
