= Amorosi (disambiguation) =

Amorosi is a comune (municipality) in the Province of Benevento in the Italian region Campania.

Amorosi may also refer to:

- Antonio Amorosi (1660–1738), Italian late-Baroque painter
- Vanessa Amorosi (born 1981), Australian musician

== See also ==
- Amoroso (disambiguation)
- Amoruso, a surname
