= Tommy Conwell =

American musician (born 1962)

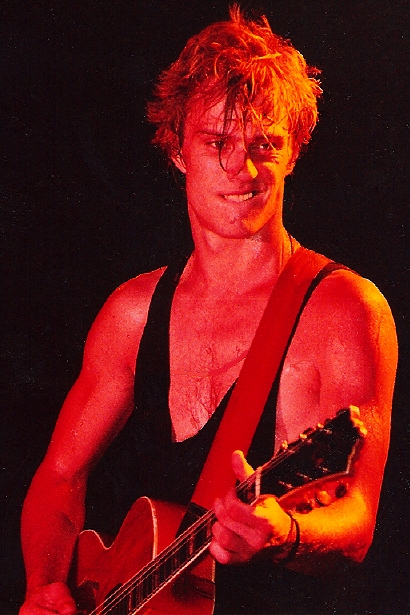
- Tommy Conwell - Stone Balloon - Newark, Delaware - Summer 1986
- Born: January 14, 1962 (age 64)
- Website: www.tommyconwellstore.com

Thomas Edward Conwell (born January 14, 1962) is an American guitarist, songwriter and performer. He is best known as the frontman for the Philadelphia-based band Tommy Conwell and the Young Rumblers. The band had a #1 US mainstream rock hit in 1988 with "I'm Not Your Man", which also peaked at 74 on the Billboard Hot 100. The original band, consisting of Conwell (guitar, vocals), Paul Slivka (stand-up bass) and Jimmy Hannum (drums), was known for its raw, high-energy live performances which included a number of classic blues and rock standards such as "Hideaway" by Freddie King, "Rumble" by Link Wray, "Time Has Come Today" by The Chambers Brothers and "Downtown Train" by Tom Waits, together with several original songs, some of which appeared on the debut album, Walkin' on the Water. Other signature tracks such as "Demolition Derby", which some felt exemplified the band's raw three-piece sound, were abandoned following the shift of the band's sound following the addition of two members, keyboard player Rob Miller and Chris Day on guitar.

Tommy Conwell and the Young Rumblers had moderate success in 1986 with their independently released album, Walkin' On the Water. The band's national major-label debut came when Columbia Records released Rumble in 1988, followed by Guitar Trouble in 1990. A third album was recorded, but the label chose not to release it. Conwell has made that available on his website.

Conwell can still be found doing solo gigs in the Philadelphia area, and in November 2010 and October 2013, he reunited with the Young Rumblers for reunion shows at the Blockley in University City, Philadelphia. On May 10, 2014, he reunited with the Young Rumblers for a show at the Ardmore Music Hall in Ardmore, PA, formerly the 23 East Cabaret, where they had played many years before. The opening act for this reunion was itself a reunion of the Philadelphia band Dynagroove, who has opened for Tommy Conwell and the Young Rumblers in the past.

Tommy Conwell and the Young Rumblers performed at the 2018 HoagieNation festival in Philadelphia on May 26, 2018.

In 2019, Tommy Conwell and the Young Rumblers released their fifth studio album, their first in nearly 30 years, Showboats and Grandstanders.

He is the brother of pro football player Joe Conwell.

== Discography ==
=== Studio albums ===
Tommy Conwell and the Young Rumblers

- Walkin' on the Water (Antenna Records - 1986)
- Rumble (Columbia - 1988) US #103
- Guitar Trouble (Columbia - 1990)
- Thanks But No Thanks (Neuroticus Maximus) (MCA - Recorded in 1992 but unreleased until 2009)
- Showboats and Grandstanders (2019)

Compilations

- Rumble / Guitar Trouble (Both Albums On 1 CD) American Beat Records / Re-issue Series (American Beat Records - 2007)

Tommy Conwell and the Little Kings

- Sho Gone Crazy by Tommy Conwell + the Little Kings (Llist Records, 1997)
- Hi Ho Silver by Tommy Conwell and the Little Kings (Llist Records, 1999)

Movie soundtracks

- Shout - Music from the Original Motion Picture Soundtrack (BMG Music, 1991)
  "Devil Call Me Back Home" (Written by Tommy Conwell and performed by Otis Rush)
  "More Than A Kiss" (Written and performed by Tommy Conwell)
- Chasers - Music from the Original Motion Picture Soundtrack (1994)
  "Rock With You" (Written By Tommy Conwell, M. Rauer) Performed By Tommy Conwell and the Young Rumblers

With Buzz Zeemer

- 1996 Play Thing (Record Cellar Productions)
- 1998 Delusions of Grandeur (Record Cellar Productions)

Compilations

- 1987 Patty Smyth, Never Enough, "Isn't It Enough" [credited guitar solo] (Columbia Records)
- 1994 A Live Christmas Extravaganza, "Run Rudolph Run" (Deko Music)
- 1997 Last Minute Jam: Volume 2. Minutes to Millennium, "What I'd Say"
- 1997 Season's Greetings Philadelphia, "Kinda Christmasy" (Record Cellar Productions)
- 2003 Who's Not Forgotten: FDR's Tribute to The Who, "Long Live Rock" [Vocal performance with the Dipsomaniacs] (Face Down Records)

=== Singles ===
Year	Title	Chart Positions	
Year	Title	Billboard Hot 100	Mainstream Rock Tracks
1988	"I'm Not Your Man"	#74	#1
1988	"If We Never Meet Again"	#48	#9
1990	"I'm Seventeen"	-	#15
1990	"Let Me Love You Too"	-	#21
