= Sebastián Pereyra =

Uruguayan footballer (born 1975)

Pablo Sebastián Pereyra (born April 28, 1975 in Montevideo) is a Uruguayan footballer who plays as a goalkeeper for Guillermo Brown of the Primera B Nacional in Argentina.

== Teams ==
- (Uruguay) Huracán Buceo 1997-2000
- (Uruguay) Deportivo Colonia 2001-2004
- (Argentina) Real Arroyo Seco 2005
- (Uruguay) Deportivo Colonia 2005-2006
- (Uruguay) Peñarol 2006
- (Uruguay) La Luz FC 2007
- (Argentina) Real Arroyo Seco 2007-2008
- (Argentina) Guillermo Brown 2008–2013

== Titles ==
Guillermo Brown

- Torneo Argentino A: 2010–11
