= Xavier Ipharraguerre =

French footballer (born 1975)

Personal information
- Full name: Xavier Ipharraguerre
- Date of birth: 3 September 1975 (age 51)
- Place of birth: Bayonne, France
- Height: 1.80 m (5 ft 11 in)
- Position: Forward

Senior career*
| Years | Team | Apps | (Gls) |
| 1993–1995 | Bordeaux B | 11 | (1) |
| 1995–1997 | Toulouse B | 41 | (8) |
| 1997–1998 | Niort | 2 | (0) |
| 1998–2000 | Pau | 26 | (2) |
| 2000–2007 | Bayonne | 49 | (14) |
- * Club domestic league appearances and goals

Xavier Ipharraguerre (born 3 September 1975) is a French former professional footballer who played as a forward. He played in Division 2 for Niort.
