= Trương Văn Hải =

Vietnamese footballer

Personal information
- Full name: Trương Văn Hải
- Date of birth: March 17, 1975 (age 51)
- Place of birth: Bình Dương, South Vietnam
- Height: 1.72 m (5 ft 8 in)
- Position: Defender

Youth career
- 1985–1989: Bình Dương

Senior career*
Years	Team	Apps	(Gls)
1990–2010	Bình Dương	489	(7)
- * Club domestic league appearances and goals

Trương Văn Hải is a Vietnamese football defender who plays for Vietnamese V-League club Bình Dương.
