= Noureddine Diwa =

Tunisian footballer (1937–2020)

- Diwa wearing the jersey of the Tunisia national team

Personal information
- Full name: Noureddine Ben Yahmed
- Date of birth: 26 February 1937
- Place of birth: Tunis, Tunisia
- Date of death: 20 April 2020 (aged 83)
- Position: Striker

Youth career
- Espérance
- Stade Tunisien

Senior career*
| Years | Team | Apps | (Gls) |
| 1955–1962 | Stade Tunisien | 144 | (96) |
| 1962–1968 | Limoges | | |
| 1968–1970 | Espérance | | |

International career
| 1956–1969 | Tunisia | 23 | (9) |
- * Club domestic league appearances and goals

Noureddine Ben Yahmed (26 February 1937 – 20 April 2020), known as Noureddine Diwa, was a Tunisian professional footballer who represented Tunisia on 23 occasions. Diwa played as a striker.

== Personal life and death ==
Diwa was born on 26 February 1937 in Tunis, Tunisia. His birth name was Noureddine Ben Yahmed. He was nicknamed Diwa as a distortion of the Tunisian Arabic word doua which means "dilettante spirit". The nickname was given to him by Stade Tunisien founder Hamadi Ben Salem. He was also nicknamed the Tunisian Kopa, and the French newspaper L'Équipe nicknamed him "Petit Kopa" (little Kopa), in reference to Real Madrid player Raymond Kopa. Diwa died on 20 April 2020 at the age of 83. He was buried the next day at the Jellaz Cemetery in Tunis.

== Career ==
As a junior, Diwa played for the Espérance junior team, and later the Stade Tunisien junior team. He won the 1952 and 1953 junior league with Stade Tunisien. Between 1955 and 1962, Diwa played for the Stade Tunisien senior team for seven seasons, making 144 appearances and scoring 96 goals. He helped Stade Tunisien reach the Tunisian National Championship, scoring four goals in the promotion playoffs. He was part of the Stade Tunisien team that won the 1956–57 Tunisian National Championship, and the National Championships in 1960–61 and 1961–62. He also won four Tunisian Cups with Stade Tunisien, in 1956, 1958, 1960, and 1962. Diwa scored in all four Tunisia Cups victories.

In 1957, he was interested in playing for French team Le Havre, but did not make the move. Diwa played for French Division 2 team Limoges between 1962 and 1968, making Diwa one of the first Tunisian players to play abroad. In 1963 he scored two goals for Limoges in their Coupe de France quarter final against Stade de Reims, a match they lost 4–3 after extra time.

In 1968, Diwa returned to Tunisia, to play for Espérance, and he played there for two seasons. During that time, he won the 1969–70 Tunisian National Championship, and was part of the Espérance team that lost the 1969 Tunisian Cup final to Club Africain.

Diwa made 23 appearances for Tunisia between 1956 and 1969. He also represented Tunisia at the 1960 Summer Olympics in Rome, Italy. It was Tunisia's first appearance in the football event at the Olympics. He played in their group stage matches against Poland, Argentina and Denmark.

After retiring as a player, Diwa was a coach at AS Djerba in 1972, Espérance in 1974, CS Chebba from 1978 to 1980, and Stade Tunisien in 1981.

== Honours ==
Stade Tunesien

- Tunisian National Championship: 1956–57, 1960–61, 1961–62
- Tunisian Cup: 1956, 1958, 1960, 1962

Espérance

- Tunisian National Championship: 1969–70
- Tunisian Cup: runner-up 1969
