= Serhiy Maherovych =

Ukrainian footballer

Personal information
- Full name: Serhiy Bohdanovych Maherovych
- Date of birth: 28 August 1975 (age 51)
- Place of birth: Soviet Union
- Position: Midfielder

Senior career*
Years	Team	Apps	(Gls)
1993–1994	FC Krystal Chortkiv	10	(0)
1993	→ FC Dnister Zalishchyky (loan)	9	(0)
1994	FC CSKA Kyiv	23	(2)
1995	FC Prykarpattya Ivano-Frankivsk	1	(0)
1997–1998	FC Zorya Khorostkiv	9	(0)
1998	FC Krystal Chortkiv	8	(0)
2006–2008	VfB 1906 Sangerhausen	?	(?)
2008–2010	VfB IMO Merseburg	?	(?)
- * Club domestic league appearances and goals as of 2 August 2011

Serhiy Bohdanovych Maherovych (Ukrainian: Сергій Богданович Магерович; born 28 August 1975) is a retired Ukrainian professional football player. player currently playing for SV Babelsberg 03.

== Career ==
Moherevych began his career with FC Krystal Chortkiv. Also played for FC CSKA Kyiv and FC Prykarpattya Ivano-Frankivsk. Later he moved to VfB 1906 Sangerhausen.
