= Aleksejs Volosanovs =

Latvian footballer

Personal information
- Full name: Aleksejs Volosanovs
- Date of birth: 5 March 1975 (age 51)
- Place of birth: Latvian SSR, Soviet Union
- Position: Midfielder

Senior career*
Years	Team	Apps	(Gls)
1994–1997	FK Rēzekne	74	(12)
1998–1999	Dinaburg FC	25	(3)
2000	FK Rēzekne	11	(1)
2001	FK Zibens/Zemessardze	24	(1)
- Ledbury Town
2003–2004	SK Dižvanagi	24	(14)
2005	Worcester City	2	(0)
- Stourport Swifts
2006–2007	Chipping Norton Town		

International career
1998	Latvia	1	(0)
- * Club domestic league appearances and goals as of 20:17, 24 March 2017 (UTC)

Aleksejs Volosanovs (born 5 March 1975) is a retired Latvian footballer who played for numerous clubs in Latvia and England.

== Club career ==
Volosanovs began his career in his native Latvia, playing for FK Rēzekne, Dinaburg FC, FK Zibens/Zemessardze and SK Dižvanagi. In the 2000s, Volosanovs moved to England and played for Ledbury Town, Worcester City, Stourport Swifts and finally Chipping Norton Town before retiring in 2007 after the club withdrew from the Hellenic League.

== International career ==
On 8 February 1998, Volosanovs played 42 minutes against Malta in the Rothmans Tournament before being substituted for Imants Bleidelis.
