= Damien Neville =

Bahamian footballer

Personal information
- Full name: Damien Neville
- Date of birth: 27 January 1975 (age 51)
- Place of birth: Bahamas
- Position: Defender

Senior career*
Years	Team	Apps	(Gls)
2003–2006	Bears	72	(2)
2006–2008	Cavalier	37	(1)
2008–2009	Caledonia Celtic		

International career
2000–2004	Bahamas	3	(0)
- * Club domestic league appearances and goals as of 11 May 2011

Damien Neville (born 27 January 1975) is a Bahamian retired soccer player.

== Club career ==
Neville played for Cavalier FC in the New Providence Football League.

== International career ==
He made his international debut for Bahamas in a March 2000 FIFA World Cup qualification match against Anguilla and has earned a total of 3 caps, scoring no goals. All games were World Cup qualifiers, his last match in March 2004 against Dominica.
