= Sébastien Ducourneau =

French footballer (born 1975)

Personal information
- Date of birth: October 8, 1975 (age 51)
- Place of birth: Mont-de-Marsan, France
- Height: 1.78 m (5 ft 10 in)
- Position: Striker

Team information
- Current team: Fontenay

Senior career*
| Years | Team | Apps | (Gls) |
| 1994–1997 | Angers SCO | 43 | (4) |
| 1997– | Fontenay | | |
- * Club domestic league appearances and goals as of 20:20, 25 November 2009 (UTC)

Sébastien Ducourneau (born October 8, 1975, in Mont-de-Marsan) is a French professional football player. Currently, he plays in the Championnat de France amateur for Vendée Fontenay Foot.

He played on the professional level in Ligue 2 for Angers SCO.
