= Franco Amoroso =

Argentine footballer

Personal information
- Full name: Franco Daniel Amoroso
- Date of birth: 4 January 1994 (age 32)
- Place of birth: Buenos Aires, Argentina
- Height: 1.75 m (5 ft 9 in)
- Position: Midfielder

Youth career
- Tijuana
- 2013: Xerez

Senior career*
Years	Team	Apps	(Gls)
2013	Xerez	2	(1)
2014	Rangers de Talca	1	(0)
- * Club domestic league appearances and goals as of 26 April 2014

Franco Daniel Amoroso (born 4 January 1994 in Buenos Aires) is an Argentine footballer who plays as a midfielder.

== Club career ==
Amoroso graduated from Club Tijuana's youth system, but left the club in January 2011, signing an 18-month contract with Xerez CD.

On 18 May 2013, Amoroso made his debut for the first team, in a 0–2 home defeat against Sporting de Gijón. On 8 June, in his only second appearance with the main squad, Amoroso scored his first goal in "silver category", in a 2–1 home win against FC Barcelona B.
