= Deda (footballer) =

Brazilian footballer (born 1975)

Personal information
- Full name: Wellington Nobre de Morais
- Date of birth: 3 July 1975 (age 51)
- Place of birth: Brasília, Brazil
- Height: 1.83 m (6 ft 0 in)
- Position: Defensive midfielder

Senior career*
Years	Team	Apps	(Gls)
1996–2003	Gama	164	(3)
2003–2006	Brasiliense	96	(2)
2006	Noroeste	19	(0)
2007	Marília	15	(2)
2008–2010	Ponte Preta	75	(1)
2010–2011	Brasiliense	46	(0)
2012	Rio Branco-SP	19	(0)
2013	Marília	20	(0)
2014–2016	Grêmio Novorizontino	45	(0)
2016–2017	Desportivo Brasil	4	(0)
Total		503	(8)
- * Club domestic league appearances and goals

Wellington Nobre de Morais known as Deda (Brasília, 3 July 1975) is a Brazilian former professional footballer who played as a defensive midfielder.

== Career ==
Deda was a member of Gama's team who won the 1998 Brasileirão Série B. He won eight state titles with Gama and four with Gama's biggest rival, Brasiliense. He played football from 1996 until 2017.

== Honours ==
Gama

- Campeonato Brasileiro Série B: 1998
- Campeonato Brasiliense: 1994, 1995, 1997, 1998, 1999, 2000, 2001, 2003

Brasiliense

- Campeonato Brasileiro Série B: 2004
- Campeonato Brasiliense: 2004, 2005, 2006, 2011

Rio Branco-SP

- Campeonato Paulista Série A3: 2012

Grêmio Novorizontino

- Campeonato Paulista Série A3: 2014
