= 1975 Iran International Tournament =

1975 Iran Cup
Tournament details
- Host country: Iran
- Dates: 11 July – 20 July
- Teams: 7 (from 3 confederations)
- Venue: 2 (in 1 host cities)

Final positions
- Champions: (Czechoslovakia) FK Teplice (1st title)
- Runners-up: Iran B
- Third place: (Soviet Union) USSR U23

Tournament statistics
- Matches played: 13
- Goals scored: 35 (2.69 per match)

The Iran International Tournament (Persian: تورنمنت بین المللی ایران) or simply known as Iran Cup (Persian: جام ایران) was a friendly football tournament held in Tehran, Iran between July 11 and July 20, 1975. This was the second edition, the first edition was 1974 Iran International Tournament.

Seven teams participated in this edition: Iran national football team A & B, Egypt national football team, Zaire national football team, USSR U23, Poland U23 and the club side FK Teplice from Czechoslovakia.

== Group stage ==
Group A

Team	Pts	Pld	W	D	L	GF	GA	GD
(Czechoslovakia) FK Teplice	3	2	1	1	0	2	1	+1
(Soviet Union) USSR U23	2	2	1	0	1	1	1	0
Iran A	1	2	0	1	1	1	2	−1

11 July 1975

Iran A	1–1	(Czechoslovakia) FK Teplice
Adelkhani 35'		Bichovsky 33'

Aryamehr Stadium, Tehran
Attendance: 40,000
Referee: Mafoala (Zaire)

13 July 1975

(Czechoslovakia) FK Teplice	1–0	(Soviet Union) USSR U23
Torevsky 50'

Persepolis Stadium, Tehran
Attendance: 2,000
Referee: Ostich (Poland)

15 July 1975

Iran A	0–1	(Soviet Union) USSR U23
		Kozenin 4'

Aryamehr Stadium, Tehran
Attendance: 35,000
Referee: Ostich (Poland)

Group B

Team	Pts	Pld	W	D	L	GF	GA	GD
Iran B	6	3	3	0	0	7	3	+4
Poland U23	4	3	2	0	1	9	5	+4
Egypt	2	3	1	0	2	6	9	−3
Zaire	0	3	0	0	3	4	9	−5

12 July 1975

Iran B	2–1	Poland U23
Haj Rahimi 10'; Nouraei 83'		Kmiecik 4'

Persepolis Stadium, Tehran
Attendance: 10,000
Referee: Moharram (Egypt)

12 July 1975

Egypt	3–2	Zaire
El-Sheikh 33'; Nur 39'; Khalil 68'	Report	Ndaye 17'; Ilonga 52'

Persepolis Stadium, Tehran
Attendance: 5,000
Referee: Mohsen Zamani (Iran)

14 July 1975

Poland U23	5–2	Egypt
Ogaza 4' (pen.); Kmiecik 20', 23'; Pawlowski 33'; Tuminski 84'		Khalif 40'; Gaafar 68' (pen.)

Persepolis Stadium, Tehran
Attendance: 10,000
Referee: Salehi (Iran)

14 July 1975

Iran B	3–1	Zaire
Nazari 26'; Dastjerdi 53', 76'	Report	Ndaye 80'

Persepolis Stadium, Tehran
Attendance: 15,000
Referee: Moharram (Egypt)

16 July 1975

Poland U23	3–1	Zaire
Kmiecik 44'; Kapka 87'; Kusto 89'		Ndaye 73'

Persepolis Stadium, Tehran
Attendance: 8,000
Referee: Nazari (Iran)

16 July 1975

Iran B	2–1	Egypt
Bishkar 38'; Bishkar 72' (pen.)	Report	Shaker 60'

Persepolis Stadium, Tehran
Attendance: 15,000
Referee: Ostich (Poland)

== Knockout stage ==
=== Bracket ===
Semi-finals
18 July – Tehran
(Czechoslovakia) FK Teplice	1
Poland U23	0
18 July – Tehran
Iran B	1
(Soviet Union) USSR U23	0

Final
20 July – Tehran
Iran B	0
(Czechoslovakia) FK Teplice (a.e.t)	1
Third place
20 July – Tehran
(Soviet Union) USSR U23	2
Poland U23	0

=== Semi finals ===
18 July 1975

(Czechoslovakia) FK Teplice	1–0	Poland U23
Thorovsky 16'

Aryamehr Stadium, Tehran
Attendance: 15,000
Referee: Namdar (Iran)

18 July 1975

Iran B	1–0	(Soviet Union) USSR U23
Shahbazi 82'

Aryamehr Stadium, Tehran
Attendance: 55,000
Referee: Moharram (Egypt)

=== Third place match ===
20 July 1975

(Soviet Union) USSR U23	2–0	Poland U23
Kurnenin 77'; Slobodian 83'

Aryamehr Stadium, Tehran
Attendance: 15,000
Referee: Salehi (Iran)

=== Final ===
20 July 1975

Iran B	0–1 (a.e.t.)	(Czechoslovakia) FK Teplice
		Thorovsky 96'

Aryamehr Stadium, Tehran
Attendance: 55,000
Referee: Ostich (Poland)
