= Dušan Sadžakov =

Montenegrin-Slovak footballer

Personal information
- Full name: Dušan Sadžakov
- Date of birth: 25 December 1975 (age 50)
- Place of birth: Novi Sad, SFR Yugoslavia
- Height: 1.87 m (6 ft 2 in)
- Position: Defender

Senior career*
Years	Team	Apps	(Gls)
1994–1995	Vrbas	15	(1)
1996–1997	Vojvodina	1	(0)
1997–2000	Vrbas	30	(1)
2000–2001	Beograd		
2002–2005	Vrbas	56	(0)
2005–2006	Jedinstvo Bijelo Polje	15	(0)
2006–2007	Grbalj	28	(0)
2007	Mladenovac	13	(2)
2008	Lovćen	10	(0)
2008–2014	Dolný Kubín		
2011–2013	→ Olympia Bobrov (loan)		
2013	→ OŠK Pribiš (loan)		
2014	→ Olympia Bobrov (loan)		
2014–2015	OŠK Pribiš		
Total		167	(4)
- * Club domestic league appearances and goals

Dušan Sadžakov (Serbian Cyrillic: Душан Саџаков; born 25 December 1975) is a Montenegrin former professional footballer who played as a defender. He also holds Slovak citizenship.

== Club career ==
Sadžakov played over 100 games for Vrbas during three seasons between 1994 and 2005. He also played for Grbalj in the inaugural 2006–07 Montenegrin First League, and for Lovćen in the following season. In the summer of 2008, Sadžakov moved to Slovakia and joined Dolný Kubín.
