= Hilario Cuenú =

Colombian footballer and manager (born 1975)

Personal information
- Full name: Hilario Cuenú Bonilla
- Date of birth: August 31, 1975 (age 51)
- Place of birth: Tuluá, Colombia
- Height: 1.85 m (6 ft 1 in)
- Position: Defender

Team information
- Current team: Cortuluá

Senior career*
Years	Team	Apps	(Gls)
1996–1999	Cortuluá		
1999–2002	Indepediente Santa Fe		
2003	Atlético Nacional		
2003	América de Cali		
2004–2007	Deportes Tolima	73	(4)
2007–2008	Atlético Junior		
2009	Atlético Huila	19	(0)
2010	Atlético Bucaramanga	0	(0)
2010–2012	Cortuluá	84	(2)

Managerial career
- 2016–: Cortuluá U20
- * Club domestic league appearances and goals as of 2 February 2016

Hilário Cuenú is a Colombian football manager and former defender. He is the manager of Cortuluá U20.
