= Adrian Vizingr =

Czech footballer

Personal information
- Date of birth: 19 April 1975 (age 51)
- Position: Defender

Senior career*
Years	Team	Apps	(Gls)
1993–1994	FK Mladá Boleslav		
1994–1995	SK Český Brod		
1995–1999	AFK Atlantic Lázně Bohdaneč		
1999–2002	FC MUS Most 1996		
2002–2004	FK Mladá Boleslav		
2004–2005	FK AS Pardubice		
2005–2006	FK Viktoria Žižkov		
- * Club domestic league appearances and goals

Adrian Vizingr (born 19 April 1975) is a retired Czech football defender.
