= Rain Vessenberg =

Estonian footballer

Personal information
- Full name: Rain Vessenberg
- Date of birth: 27 November 1975 (age 50)
- Place of birth: Estonia
- Height: 1.87 m (6 ft 1 1/2 in)
- Position: Goalkeeper

International career^{‡}
| Years | Team | Apps | (Gls) |
| 1994–1995 | Estonia | 5 | (0) |
- ‡ National team caps and goals as of 23 May 2009

Rain Vessenberg (born 27 November 1975) is a retired football (soccer) goalkeeper from Estonia. He played for several clubs in his native country, including JK Nõmme United and JK Viljandi Tulevik.

== International career ==
Vessenberg earned his first official cap for the Estonia national football team on 26 October 1994, when Estonia played Finland in a friendly match in the Kadrioru Stadium in Tallinn: 0:7. He obtained a total number of five caps.
