= Alessandro Piovesan =

Italian footballer (born 1975)

Personal information
- Date of birth: 30 October 1975 (age 50)
- Place of birth: Venice, Italy
- Height: 1.81 m (5 ft 11 1/2 in)
- Position: Midfielder

Senior career*
Years	Team	Apps	(Gls)
1995–1998	Padova	1	(0)
1996–1997	→ Pisa (loan)	18	(0)
1998	Santegidiese	13	(0)
1998–2000	Sandonà	65	(2)
2000–2002	Mestre	51	(0)
2002–2003	Pavia	16	(1)
2003	Trento	10	(0)
2003–2004	Genoa	0	(0)
2004–2005	Savona	22	(0)
2005–2007	Venezia	45	(1)
2007	Pergocrema	13	(0)
2007–2008	Bassano Virtus	2	(0)
2008	Sansovino	5	(0)
2008–2010	Itala San Marco	42	(0)
2010–2011	Vigontina	?	(?)
- * Club domestic league appearances and goals

Alessandro Piovesan (born 30 October 1975) is an Italian former footballer. He has spent most of his career in the Serie C2, he has represented teams from all of the major Italian divisions, from Serie A to Serie D.

== Career ==
Piovesan started his professional career playing for Serie A side Padova in 1995. Having made a single appearance in his debut season, he went on loan to Serie C2 side Pisa for the 1996–97 season, where he made 18 league appearances. Although he returned to Padova for the following season, he did not play again for the club, and instead switched to Serie D side Santegidiese in January 1998. After a successful spell with the club, where he made 13 appearances, he returned to the Serie C2 with Sandonà in the summer; he became a regular for the club, and made 65 out of a possible 68 league appearances for them. He then joined Serie C2 side Mestre in 2000, where he made 51 league appearances before leaving for Pavia, who also played in the Serie C2. However, after 16 games in the league, he switched to Trento, where he made ten further appearances that season. A move to Genoa followed in 2003, but he left the club in 2004 without making an appearance; instead, he spent the 2004–05 season back in the Serie D, with Savona, where he made 22 league appearances. He then once again moved to a Serie C2 club for the following season, when he joined Venezia; he made 45 league appearances before joining Pergocrema in January 2007, where he made 13 league appearances.

Piovesan remained in the Serie C2 for the 2007–08 season; but an unsuccessful spell at Bassano Virtus (where he made two league appearances) was matched by a similarly unsuccessful spell at Sansovino, whom he made five league appearances for after moving in January 2008. He switched to Serie C2 side Itala San Marco in the summer of 2008, where he made 42 league appearances in a two-season spell. In 2010, he joined Vigontina, marking the end of his professional career.

In 2014, he joined the Venezia Soccer Academy.
