= Julio Briones =

Ecuadorian footballer (born 1975)

Personal information
- Full name: Julio Briones
- Date of birth: July 1, 1975 (age 51)
- Place of birth: Ecuador
- Position: Defensive midfielder

Senior career*
Years	Team	Apps	(Gls)
1994–1995	Green Cross		
1996	Delfín		
1997	Green Cross		
1998–2004	Delfín		
2005	Manta		

International career^{‡}
1998	Ecuador	1	(0)
- * Club domestic league appearances and goals as of 2009-07-11 ‡ National team caps and goals as of 2009-07-11

Julio Briones (born July 1, 1975) is a football midfielder from Ecuador. He earned one cap for the Ecuador national team during his career. His only appearance for the squad came on October 14, 1998, when Ecuador lost 5-1 in a friendly match against Brazil. Briones was a second-half substitute for Héctor Carabalí.
