= Sergei Lutsevich =

Russian footballer

Personal information
- Full name: Sergei Valeryevich Lutsevich
- Date of birth: 22 June 1975 (age 51)
- Place of birth: Krasnodar, Russian SFSR
- Height: 1.80 m (5 ft 11 in)
- Position: Midfielder

Youth career
- Yunost Krasnodar

Senior career*
Years	Team	Apps	(Gls)
1993–1994	FC KamAZavtotsentr Naberezhnye Chelny	56	(7)
1995	FC Magistral Dinskaya		
1996–1998	FC Kuban Slavyansk-na-Kubani	78	(19)
1998	FC Chernomorets Novorossiysk	1	(0)
1999	FC Neftyanik Krasnodar		
2000	FC Nemkom Krasnodar (amateur)		
2001–2003	FC Slavyansk Slavyansk-na-Kubani	115	(42)
2004	FC Kavkaztransgaz Izobilny	27	(5)
2006	FC Kolos Timashyovsk		
2007	FC Goryachiy Klyuch		
2008	FC Dinskaya (amateur)		
2009	FC Dynamo Krasnodar		
- * Club domestic league appearances and goals

Sergei Valeryevich Lutsevich (Russian: Сергей Валерьевич Луцевич; born 22 June 1975 in Krasnodar) is a former Russian football player.
