= Christophe Anly =

Malagasy footballer

Personal information
- Date of birth: 15 November 1975 (age 50)
- Place of birth: Bobasakoa, Madagascar
- Position: Midfielder

Senior career*
Years	Team	Apps	(Gls)
1999–2001	Sirama		
2002	AS Fortior		
2003	Léopards de Transfoot		
2004–2006	AS Fortior		

International career
2002–2003	Madagascar	4	(0)
- * Club domestic league appearances and goals

Christophe Anly (born 15 November 1975) is a Malagasy retired footballer who played as a midfielder.
