= Semjbaataryn Baatarsüren =

Mongolian footballer

Personal information
- Full name: Semjbaataryn Baatarsüren; Сэмжбаатарын Баатарсүрэн
- Date of birth: November 10, 1975 (age 50)
- Place of birth: Mongolia
- Position: Midfielder

Team information
- Current team: Khoromkhon

Senior career*
| Years | Team | Apps | (Gls) |
| 2003–2004 | Ulaanbaatar Mon-Uran | 13 | (3) |
| 2005– | Khoromkhon | | |

International career
| 2000– | Mongolia | 12 | (0) |
- * Club domestic league appearances and goals

Semjbaataryn Baatarsüren (Mongolian: Сэмжбаатарын Баатарсүрэн; born 10 November 1975) is a Mongolian international footballer. He made his first appearance for the Mongolia national football team in 2000.
