= Aleksei Ilatovskiy =

Russian footballer

Personal information
- Full name: Aleksei Valentinovich Ilatovskiy
- Date of birth: 21 February 1975 (age 51)
- Height: 1.83 m (6 ft 0 in)
- Position: Midfielder

Senior career*
Years	Team	Apps	(Gls)
1993–1996	FC KAMAZ Naberezhnye Chelny	2	(0)
1993–1996	→ FC KAMAZ-d Naberezhnye Chelny (loans)	100	(4)
1997	FC Elektron Vyatskiye Polyany	30	(2)
1998	FC Devon Almetyevsk (amateur)		
1998–1999	FC KAMAZ-Chally Naberezhnye Chelny	16	(1)
2000	FC Turbina-KamGIFK Naberezhnye Chelny (amateur)		
2001	FC Lada-Energiya Dimitrovgrad	12	(0)
2003	FC Fakel Naberezhnye Chelny		
- * Club domestic league appearances and goals

Aleksei Valentinovich Ilatovskiy (Russian: Алексей Валентинович Илатовский; born 21 February 1975) is a former Russian football player.
