= 1974 Iran International Tournament =

1974 Iran Cup
Tournament details
- Host country: Iran
- Dates: 11 July – 21 July
- Teams: 7 (from 3 confederations)
- Venue: 1 (in 1 host cities)

Final positions
- Champions: Iran A (1st title)
- Runners-up: (Czechoslovakia) FK Teplice
- Third place: (Romania) FC Brașov
- Fourth place: (Poland) Zagłębie Sosnowiec

Tournament statistics
- Matches played: 13
- Goals scored: 18 (1.38 per match)

The Iran International Tournament (Persian: تورنمنت بین المللی ایران) or simply known as Iran Cup (Persian: جام ایران) was a friendly football tournament held in Tehran, Iran. The first edition was held between July 12 and July 21, 1974. The second edition was 1975 Iran International Tournament.

Seven teams participated in this edition: Iran national football team A & B, Tunisia national football team, USSR U23 and club sides Zagłębie Sosnowiec from Poland, FC Brașov from Romania, and FK Teplice from Czechoslovakia.

== Group stage ==
Group A

Team	Pts	Pld	W	D	L	GF	GA	GD
FC Brașov	4	1	2	0	0	5	4	+1
(Poland) Zagłębie Sosnowiec	3	1	1	1	1	3	2	+1
Iran B	3	3	1	1	1	1	1	0
Tunisia	2	3	0	2	1	2	5	−2

11 July 1974

Iran B	1–0	(Poland) Zagłębie Sosnowiec
Jahani 70'

Amjadiyeh Stadium, Tehran
Attendance: 20,000
Referee: Zaif Saudi (Tunisia)
11 July 1974

Tunisia	3–3	FC Brașov
Dhiab 9'; Habita 54', 90+1'		Tresko 28'; Matsko 40'; Serino 41'

Amjadiyeh Stadium, Tehran
Attendance: 20,000
Referee: Mohammad Salehi (Iran)

13 July 1974

Iran B	0–0	Tunisia

Amjadiyeh Stadium, Tehran
Attendance: 15,000
Referee: Tofiq Bahramov (USSR)
13 July 1974

Zagłębie Sosnowiec (Poland)	1–1	FC Brașov
Kaspersky 52'		Papuk 62'

Amjadiyeh Stadium, Tehran
Attendance: 15,000
Referee: Mostafa Etemadi (Iran)

15 July 1974

Iran B	0–1	FC Brașov
		Papuk 51'

Amjadiyeh Stadium, Tehran
Attendance: 12,000
Referee: Tofiq Bahramov (USSR)
15 July 1974

Zagłębie Sosnowiec (Poland)	2–0	Tunisia
Caneski 26'; Mazor 64'

Amjadiyeh Stadium, Tehran
Attendance: 12,000
Referee: Reza Heydari (Iran)

Group B

Team	Pts	Pld	W	D	L	GF	GA	GD
Iran A	3	2	1	1	0	1	0	+1
(Czechoslovakia) FK Teplice	2	2	1	0	1	1	1	0
(Soviet Union) USSR U23	1	2	0	1	1	1	2	−1

12 July 1974

Iran A	1–0	(Soviet Union) USSR U23
Mazloumi 37'

Amjadiyeh Stadium, Tehran
Attendance: 20,000
Referee: Zaif Saudi (Tunisia)

14 July 1974

Iran A	0–0	(Czechoslovakia) FK Teplice

Amjadiyeh Stadium, Tehran
Attendance: 12,000
Referee: Mazowiecki (Poland)

16 July 1974

FK Teplice (Czechoslovakia)	1–1	(Soviet Union) USSR U23
Starkhin 22'		Torevsky 87'

Amjadiyeh Stadium, Tehran
Attendance: 12,000
Referee: Manouchehr Nazari (Iran)

== Knockout stage ==
=== Bracket ===
Semi-finals
19 July – Tehran
Iran A	3
(Poland) Zagłębie Sosnowiec	1
20 July – Tehran
(Czechoslovakia) FK Teplice	1
(Romania) FC Brașov	0

Final
21 July – Tehran
Iran A (pen.)	0 (6)
(Czechoslovakia) FK Teplice	0 (5)
Third place
21 July – Tehran
(Romania) FC Brașov (pen.)	0 (3)
(Poland) Zagłębie Sosnowiec	0 (1)

=== Semi finals ===
19 July 1974

Iran A	3–1	(Poland) Zagłębie Sosnowiec
Ashtiani 61'; Jabbari 79', 82'		Kaspersky 46'

Amjadiyeh Stadium, Tehran
Attendance: 15,000
Referee: Tofiq Bahramov (USSR)

20 July 1974

FK Teplice (Czechoslovakia)	1–0	(Romania) FC Brașov
Kopek 27'

Amjadiyeh Stadium, Tehran
Attendance: 12,000
Referee: Mazowiecki (Poland)

=== Third place match ===
21 July 1974

Zagłębie Sosnowiec (Poland)	0–0	FC Brașov
Penalties
	1–3

Amjadiyeh Stadium, Tehran
Attendance: 12,000
Referee: Manouchehr Nazari (Iran)

=== Final ===
21 July 1974

Iran A	0–0	(Czechoslovakia) FK Teplice
Penalties
	6–5

Amjadiyeh Stadium, Tehran
Attendance: 24,000
Referee: Tofiq Bahramov (USSR)
