= Eduard Doronin =

Russian footballer

Personal information
- Full name: Eduard Igorevich Doronin
- Date of birth: 23 March 1975 (age 51)
- Height: 1.84 m (6 ft 1/2 in)
- Position: Midfielder

Senior career*
Years	Team	Apps	(Gls)
1994	FC Neftyanik Pokhvistnevo	4	(0)
1995	FC Lada Togliatti	0	(0)
1995	→ FC Lada-d Togliatti (loan)	14	(0)
1995	FC Lokomotiv Nizhny Novgorod	1	(0)
1996–1997	FC Lada Togliatti	14	(0)
1998	FC Anapa	18	(0)
- * Club domestic league appearances and goals

Eduard Igorevich Doronin (Russian: Эдуард Игоревич Доронин; born 23 March 1975) is a former Russian football player.
