= Amoroso's Baking Company =

American commercial bakery

Coordinates: 39.8624°N 75.0847°W

- Type: Private company
- Industry: Commercial Bakery
- Founded: 1904
- Headquarters: Philadelphia, Pennsylvania, US,
- Key people: Amoroso Family
- Products: Amoroso Philly roll various breads bagels pretzels
- Revenue: $40 million USD (2006)
- Number of employees: 400+ (2012)
- Website: www.amorosobaking.com

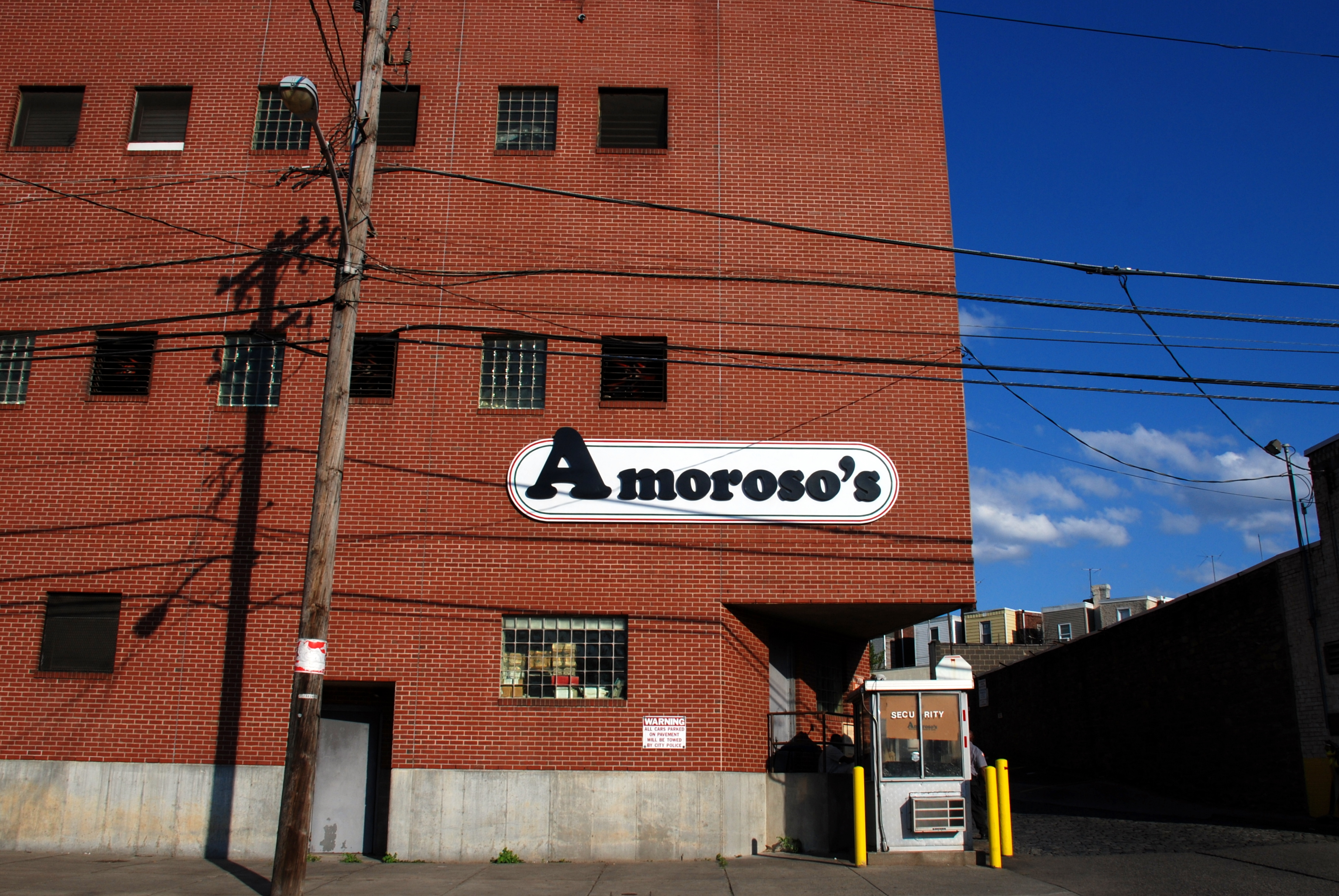
Amoroso's factory (2009)

Amoroso's Baking Company is a commercial bakery operating in the greater Philadelphia metropolitan area.

== History ==
The company was founded in 1904 in Camden, New Jersey, by Vincenzo Amoroso and his sons, Salvatore and Joseph. Having outgrown their location in Camden, the company moved to a new facility at 6505 Haverford Avenue in Philadelphia in 1914. The company thrived during the Great Depression by making home deliveries twice a day, in the mornings and afternoons.

In 1934, Salvatore took over the operations of the company with the help of his sons, Daniel, Vincent, Leonard and Sal Jr. In 1952, Amoroso began selling Hearth Baked bread and rolls to A & P Supermarkets in West Philadelphia. Due to increased demand, in 1960 the company expanded into a new facility located at 845 South 55th Street. Today, after four major expansions, Amoroso Baking Company employs more than 400 people, and its expanded line of baked goods is available in more than 36 states. The company is still owned and managed by members of the Amoroso family, and is still one of the dominant bakeries in the Philadelphia area.

Formerly located in West Philadelphia, in 2015 Amoroso announced they would move operations to Bellmawr, New Jersey, where they are now located.
