= Iran national football B team =

Iranian football team

Iran B ایران ب
- Nickname(s): Team melli B (Persian: تیم ملی ب); The National B Team
- Association: FFIRI
- Confederation: AFC
- Home stadium: Azadi Stadium
First colours	Second colours

First international
- Tunisia 0–0 Iran B (Tehran, Iran; 14 July 1974); 1974 Iran International Tournament

Biggest win
- Tajikistan 0–9 Iran B (Jeddah, Saudi Arabia; 10 April 2005)

The Iran national football B team is a football team run occasionally as support for the Iran national football team. At times, they have played other nations' full teams, and have also played matches against 'A' and 'B' teams from other football associations.

== Tournament ==
- 1974 Iran International Tournament: Semifinals
- 1975 Iran International Tournament: Runners-up
- (China) 1st Great Wall Cup 1983: 9th place
- (Iran) 1986 Fajr International Tournament: Group stage
- (Bangladesh) 1989 President's Gold Cup: Third place
- (Saudi Arabia) 2005 Islamic Games: Third place
- (Jordan) 2007 WAFF: Champions

== Managers ==
- (Iran) Heshmat Mohajerani (1975)
- (Iran) Nasser Ebrahimi (February 1986)
- (Iran) Bijan Zolfagharnasab (April 2005)
- (Iran) Parviz Mazloumi (June 2007 to July 2007)
- (Iran) Markar Aghajanian (January 2012 to November 2012)
- (Portugal) António Simões (November 2012 to February 2014)
- (Portugal) Oceano da Cruz (September 2015)
