= Maksim Shiryayev (footballer, born 1975) =

Russian footballer

Personal information
- Full name: Maksim Dmitriyevich Shiryayev
- Date of birth: 28 September 1975 (age 51)
- Place of birth: Moscow, Russian SFSR
- Height: 1.84 m (6 ft 1/2 in)
- Position: Midfielder

Youth career
- FShM Moscow

Senior career*
Years	Team	Apps	(Gls)
1993–1994	FC Mosenergo Moscow	82	(6)
1995–1997	FC Torpedo-Luzhniki Moscow	2	(0)
1995–1997	→ FC Torpedo-d Moscow (loans)	58	(4)
1998–2003	FC Mosenergo Moscow	209	(24)
2004–2006	FC Spartak Shchyolkovo	52	(1)
2006	FC Dmitrov (amateur)		
2007	FC Olimp-SKOPA Zheleznodorozhny		
- * Club domestic league appearances and goals

Maksim Dmitriyevich Shiryayev (Russian: Максим Дмитриевич Ширяев; born 28 September 1975) is a former Russian football player.
