= Luca Amoruso =

Italian footballer

Personal information
- Date of birth: 15 November 1975 (age 50)
- Place of birth: Canosa di Puglia, Italy
- Height: 1.80 m (5 ft 11 in)
- Position: Midfielder

Senior career*
Years	Team	Apps	(Gls)
1993–1995	Foggia	3	(0)
1995–1996	Avellino	2	(0)
1996–1997	Modena	27	(4)
1997–1998	Battipagliese	10	(0)
1998–1999	Giugliano	7	(0)
1999–2001	Torres	70	(28)
2001–2002	Crotone	9	(0)
2002	Catania	9	(1)
2002–2003	Crotone	14	(1)
2003	Cosenza	0	(0)
2003	Crotone	0	(0)
2003–2004	Chieti	9	(0)
- * Club domestic league appearances and goals as of 21 February 2015

Luca Amoruso (born 15 November 1975) is an Italian retired footballer. He played as midfielder.
