= Down North (band) =

American soul punk band

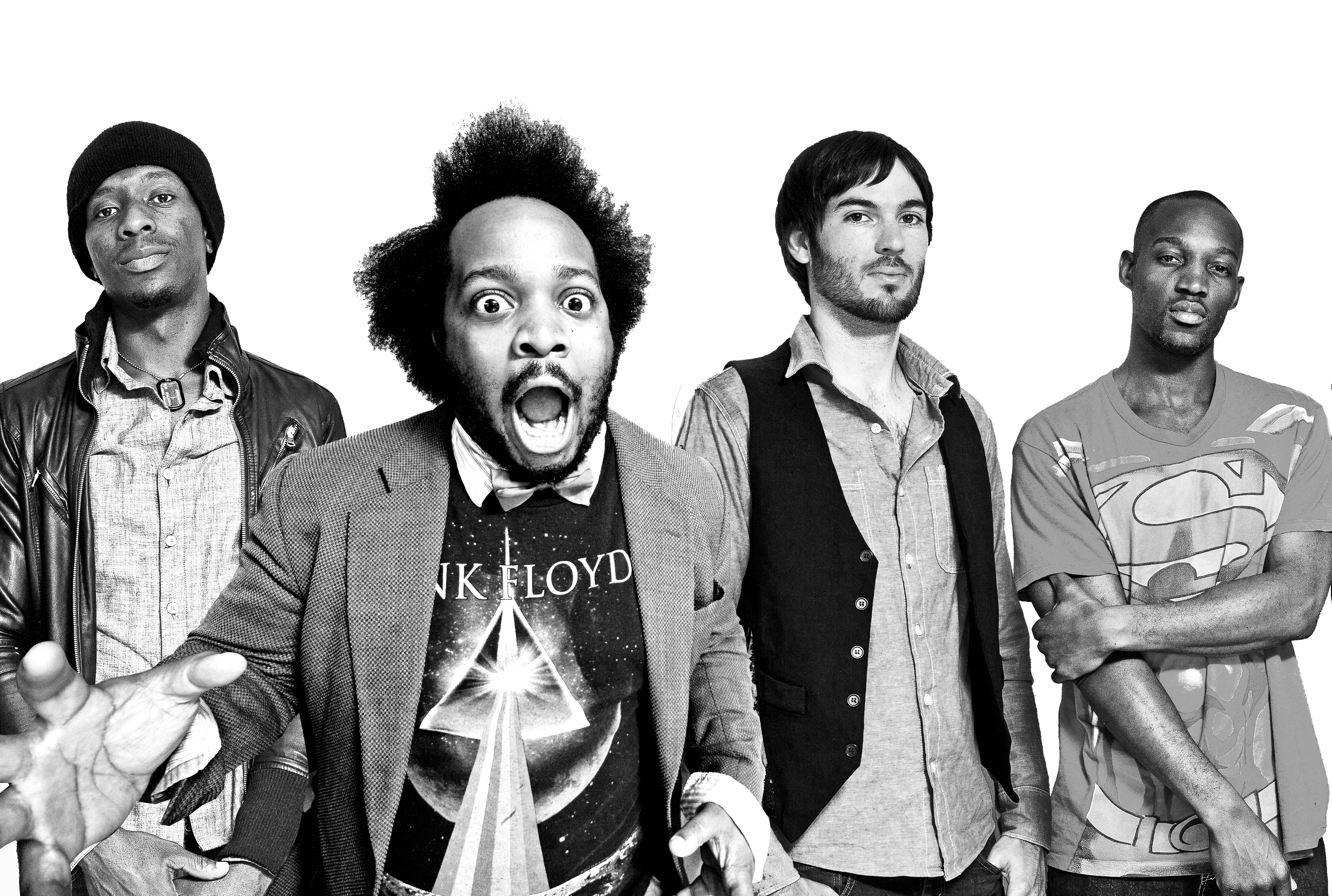

Down North is a soul punk band based in Seattle. They have had their music featured on MTV's Real World, and have performed at Bumbershoot and SXSW. The band formed with 7 original members that included Brandon Storms (bass) and former members Tony Demuri (drums), Scott Smith (keys/rhythm guitar) and Jordan Haas (lead guitar) in 2003 at Shoreline Community College, with frontman Anthony "RenaGade" Briscoe joining 2007, known for his "original" dancing and vocal styles, along with his incredible gastronomical abilities. In that time frame they recorded "the Danger EP"(2008). The current and "most commonly known" line up which was established in 2010 after they reformed as a 4-piece bringing in Nicholas Quiller (guitar) and Conrad Real (drums) that they re-recorded tracks from the Danger EP in which Anthony Wrote the lyrics and included the hit song Heartbreaker (2011) which featured Jimmy James from the True Loves/Delvon Lamarr Organ on guitar and released it as "No Retreat Vol.1" in 2018 with the current line up. They are currently in the studio working on a new 2022 release.
