= Uzbekistan Super League Top Scorer =

In Uzbek football, Uzbekistan Super League Topscorer (Uzbek: Oʻzbekiston Superligasi to'purari or Ўзбекистон Суперлигаси тўпурари) is an annual award by Uzbekistan Football Association given to the top goalscorer at the end of the Uzbekistan Super League season, the top domestic league competition in club football in Uzbekistan, since its creation in 1992.

Jafar Irismetov is the only player who won award 3 times and the goalscorer scored most per season with 45 goals in 2000. Brazilian forward Rivaldo became the first foreign player won Uzbekistan Super League Top Scorer award in 2009, scoring 20 goals. Serbian striker Dragan Ćeran is the only foreign player who became The top goalscorer twice: 2019, 2020.

== List of topscorers ==
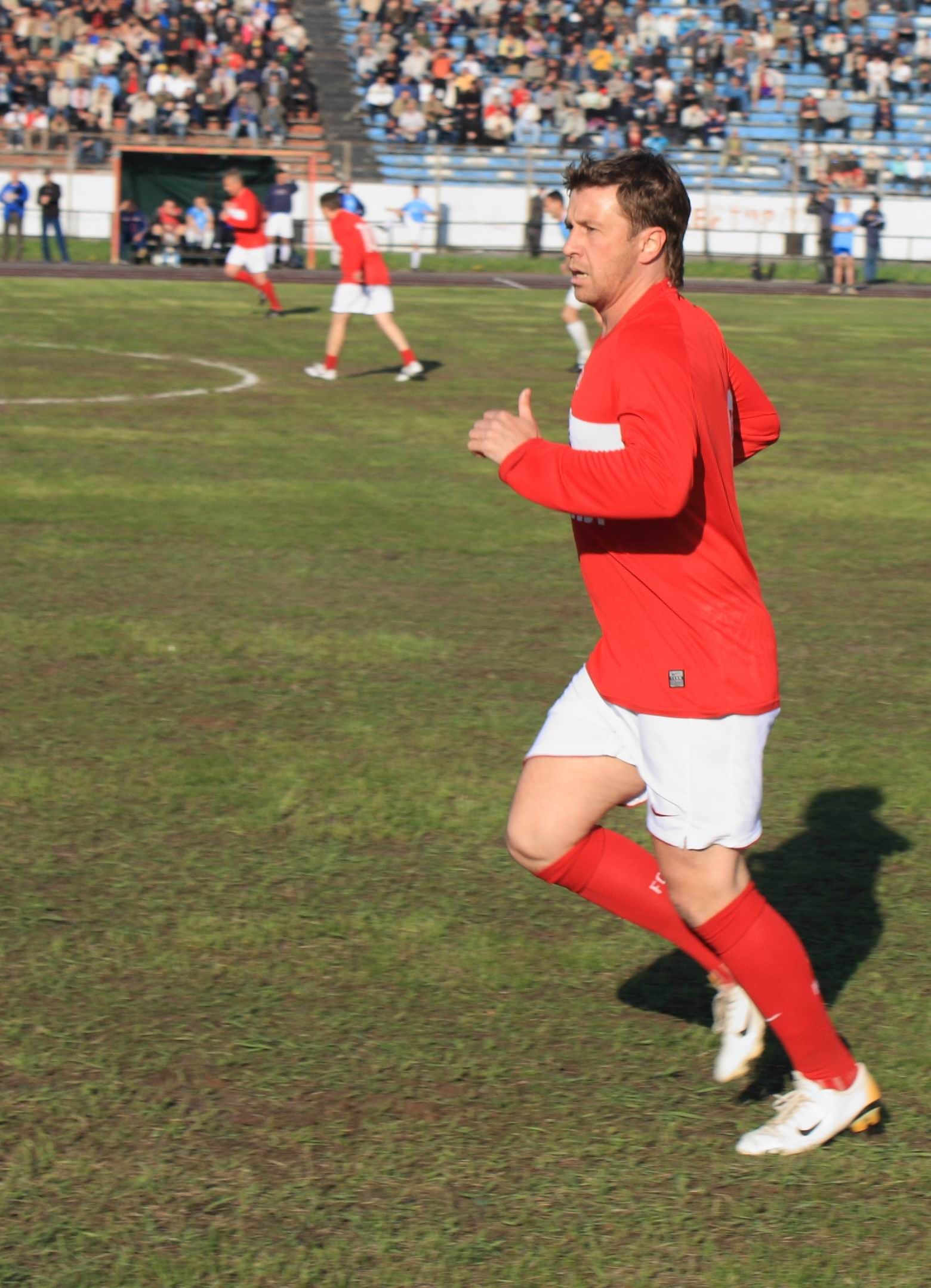
Valery Kechinov, with 24 goals top scorer of 1992 season

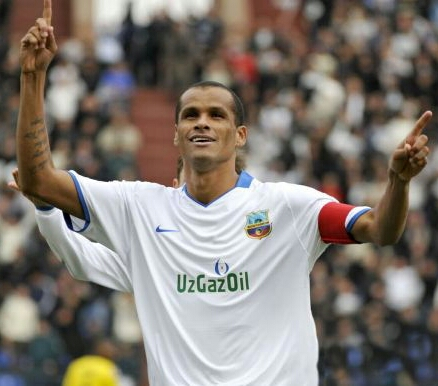
Rivaldo, first foreign player to become League goal scorer in 2009

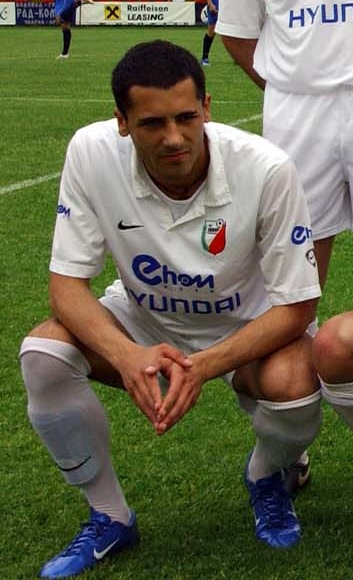
Miloš Trifunović, League goal scorer in 2011

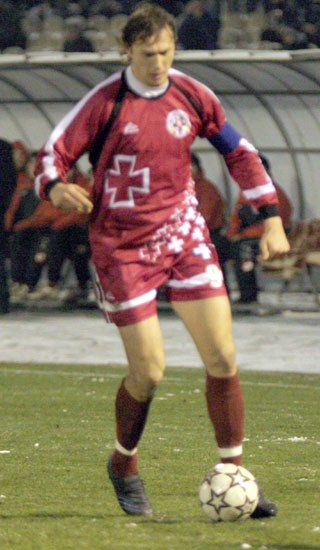
Oleksandr Pyschur, Super League goal scorer in 2013

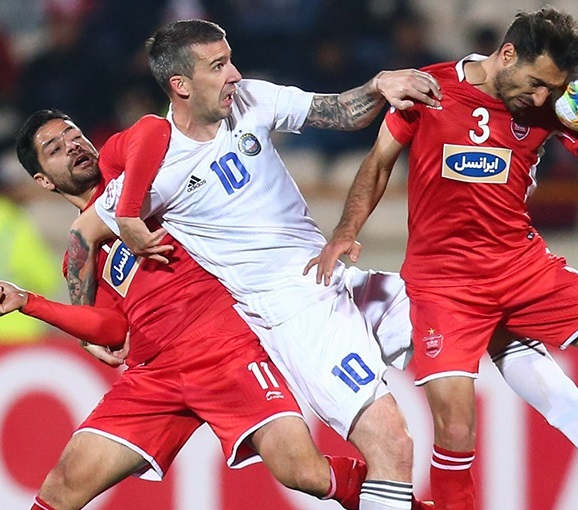
Dragan Ćeran, Super League goal scorer in 2019, 2020, 2021, 2022

Season	Player	Club	Goals
1992	(Uzbekistan) Valeriy Kechinov	Pakhtakor	24
1993	(Uzbekistan) Rustam Durmonov	Neftchi Farg'ona	26
1994	(Uzbekistan) Ravshan Bozorov	Neftchi Farg'ona	26
1995	(Uzbekistan) Oleg Shatskikh	Politotdel (2); Navbahor Namangan (24)	26
1996	(Uzbekistan) Jafar Irismetov	Dustlik	23
1996	(Uzbekistan) Oleg Shatskikh	Navbahor Namangan	23
1997	(Uzbekistan) Jafar Irismetov	Dustlik	34
1998	(Uzbekistan) Mirjalol Kasymov	Pakhtakor	22
1998	(Uzbekistan) Igor Shkvyrin	Pakhtakor	22
1999	(Uzbekistan) Umid Isoqov	Neftchi Farg'ona	24
1999	(Uzbekistan) Bakhtiyor Hamidullaev	FK Andijan	24
2000	(Uzbekistan) Jafar Irismetov	Dustlik	45
2001	(Uzbekistan) Umid Isoqov	Neftchi Farg'ona	28
2002	(Uzbekistan) Bakhtiyor Hamidullaev	FK Andijan	22
2003	(Uzbekistan) Marsel Idiatullin	Qizilqum Zarafshon	26
2003	(Uzbekistan) Shuhrat Mirkholdirshoev	Navbahor Namangan	26
2004	(Uzbekistan) Shuhrat Mirkholdirshoev	Navbahor Namangan	31
2005	(Uzbekistan) Anvar Soliev	Pakhtakor	29
2006	(Uzbekistan) Pavel Solomin	Traktor Tashkent	21
2007	(Uzbekistan) Ilhom Mo'minjonov	Lokomotiv Tashkent (5); PFC Kuruvchi (16)	21
2008	(Uzbekistan) Server Djeparov	Bunyodkor	19
2009	(Brazil) Rivaldo	Bunyodkor	20
2010	(Uzbekistan) Alisher Kholiqov	Neftchi Farg'ona	13
2010	(Uzbekistan) Nosirbek Otakuziyev	Olmaliq FK	13
2011	(Serbia) Miloš Trifunović	Bunyodkor	22
2012	(Uzbekistan) Anvar Berdiev	Neftchi Farg'ona	19
2013	(Ukraine) Oleksandr Pyschur	Bunyodkor	19
2014	(Turkmenistan) Artur Gevorkyan	Nasaf Qarshi	18
2015	(Uzbekistan) Igor Sergeev	Pakhtakor	24
2016	(Uzbekistan) Temurkhuja Abdukholiqov	Lokomotiv	22
2017	(Uzbekistan) Marat Bikmaev	Lokomotiv	27
2018	(Brazil) Tiago Bezerra	Pakhtakor	17
2019	(Serbia) Dragan Ćeran	Pakhtakor	23
2020	(Serbia) Dragan Ćeran	Pakhtakor	20
2021	(Serbia) Dragan Ćeran	Pakhtakor	16
2022	(Serbia) Dragan Ćeran	Pakhtakor	20
2023	(Serbia) Dragan Ćeran	Pakhtakor	13
2024	(Serbia) Dragan Ćeran	Pakhtakor	13
2025	(Uzbekistan) Igor Sergeev	Pakhtakor	20

== By player ==
Players	Total	Years
Dragan Ćeran	6	2019, 2020, 2021, 2022, 2023, 2024
Jafar Irismetov	3	1996, 1997, 2000
Igor Sergeev	2	2015, 2025
Bakhtiyor Hamidullaev	2	1999, 2002
Umid Isoqov	2	1999, 2001
Shuhrat Mirkholdirshoev	2	2003, 2004
Oleg Shatskikh	2	1995, 1996

== By club ==
Club	Players	Total	Years
Pakhtakor	7	10	1992, 1998 (2), 2005, 2015, 2018, 2019, 2020, 2021, 2022
Neftchi Farg'ona	5	6	1993, 1994, 1999, 2001, 2010, 2012
Bunyodkor	5	5	2007, 2008, 2009, 2011, 2013
Dustlik	1	3	1996, 1997, 2000
Navbahor	2	3	1995, 1996, 2004
FK Andijan	1	2	1999, 2002
Lokomotiv Tashkent	2	2	2016, 2017
Nasaf Qarshi	1	1	2014
Qizilqum Zarafshon	1	1	2003
Olmaliq FK	1	1	2010
Traktor Tashkent	1	1	2006

== See also ==
- Gennadi Krasnitsky club
- Club 200 of Berador Abduraimov
- Uzbekistan Footballer of the Year
- Uzbekistan Football Coach of the Year
