= Akmal Kholmatov =

Tajikistani footballer

Personal information
- Full name: Akmal Kholmatov
- Date of birth: 4 April 1976 (age 50)
- Place of birth: Tajikistan
- Height: 1.68 m (5 ft 6 in)
- Position: Midfielder

Senior career*
Years	Team	Apps	(Gls)
1993–1996	Regar-TadAZ		
1996–2008	Neftchi Fargʻona	301	(69)
2008–2010	Pakhtakor Tashkent	31	(3)
2010–2012	PAS Hamedan	29	(2)
2012–2014	Lokomotiv Tashkent	44	(12)
2014–2016	Neftchi Fargʻona	38	(5)
2016	Istiklol	4	(2)
2016	Neftchi Fargʻona	12	(0)
2017	Shurtan Guzar	4	(0)
2018	Iftikhor		
2019	Rash-Milk		

International career
2003–2007	Tajikistan	10	(2)
- * Club domestic league appearances and goals as of 3 July 2017

Akmal Kholmatov (born 4 April 1976) is a former Tajikistani footballer.

== Career ==
=== Club ===
Kholmatov played for Regar-TadAZ between 1993 and 1996. During 1996 Kholmatov moved to Uzbekistan, signing for Neftchi Fargʻona, and becoming an Uzbek citizen in 2001. After 12 years at Neftchi Fargʻona, Kholmatov moved to fellow Uzbek club Pakhtakor Tashkent for three seasons, before joining Iranian side PAS Hamedan in 2011. A year later Kholmatov returned to Uzbekistan with Lokomotiv Tashkent before rejoining Neftchi Fargʻona in 2014. Kholmatov left Neftchi Fargʻona at the end of the 2015 season. After leaving Neftchi Fargʻona, Kholmatov featured for FC Istiklol in the pre-season friendlies, scoring in a 3–1 defeat to Várda SE in February 2016. In June 2016, Kholmatov left FC Istiklol returning to Neftchi Fargʻona.

==== Name controversy ====
Kholmatov came under scrutiny in 2007, when the Asian Football Confederation launched an investigation into the identities of two Central Asian players who they believed had falsified documentation to play in AFC competitions. The investigation showed that the two players registered "Akmal Kholmatov" and "Akhmal Holmatov" were actually the same person.

=== International ===
Kholmatov played for Tajikistan between 2003 and 2007, taking part in their 2010 FIFA World Cup qualification campaign.

== Career statistics ==
=== Club ===
As of match played 6 May 2017

Appearances and goals by club, season and competition
Club	Season	League			National Cup		Continental		Other		Total	
Club	Season	Division	Apps	Goals	Apps	Goals	Apps	Goals	Apps	Goals	Apps	Goals
Neftchi Fargʻona	1996	Uzbek League	7	0			-		-		7	0
Neftchi Fargʻona	1997	Uzbek League	26	0			-		-		26	0
Neftchi Fargʻona	1998	Uzbek League	19	2			-		-		19	2
Neftchi Fargʻona	1999	Uzbek League	8	0			-		-		8	0
Neftchi Fargʻona	2000	Uzbek League	38	8			-		-		38	8
Neftchi Fargʻona	2001	Uzbek League	33	7			-		-		33	7
Neftchi Fargʻona	2002	Uzbek League	30	3			-		-		30	3
Neftchi Fargʻona	2003	Uzbek League	30	8			-		-		30	8
Neftchi Fargʻona	2004	Uzbek League	25	5			-		-		25	5
Neftchi Fargʻona	2005	Uzbek League	26	9			-		-		26	9
Neftchi Fargʻona	2006	Uzbek League	29	8			-		-		29	8
Neftchi Fargʻona	2007	Uzbek League	30	19			-		-		30	19
Neftchi Fargʻona	Total		301	69			-	-	-	-	301	69
Pakhtakor Tashkent	2008	Uzbek League	8	0			0	0	-		8	0
Pakhtakor Tashkent	2009	Uzbek League	13	2			2	0	-		13	2
Pakhtakor Tashkent	2010	Uzbek League	10	1	1	0	5	0	-		16	1
Pakhtakor Tashkent	Total		31	3	1	0	7	0	-	-	39	3
PAS Hamedan	2010–11	Iran Pro League	29	2			–		–		29	2
Lokomotiv Tashkent	2012	Uzbek League	13	2	2	0	–		–		15	2
Lokomotiv Tashkent	2013	Uzbek League	26	10	4	1	1	1	–		31	12
Lokomotiv Tashkent	2014	Uzbek League	5	0	2	0	0	0	1	0	8	0
Lokomotiv Tashkent	Total		44	12	8	1	1	1	1	0	54	14
Neftchi Fargʻona	2014	Uzbek League	11	1	0	0	–		–		11	1
Neftchi Fargʻona	2015	Uzbek League	25	4	0	0	–		–		25	4
Neftchi Fargʻona	Total		36	5	0	0	-	-	-	-	36	5
Istiklol	2016	Tajik League	4	2	0	0	5	0	1	0	10	2
Neftchi Fargʻona	2016	Uzbek League	12	0	0	0	-		-		12	0
Shurtan Guzar	2017	Uzbek League	4	0	0	0	-		-		4	0
Career total			461	93			13	1	2	0	476	95

=== International ===
Tajikistan national team
Year	Apps	Goals
2003	6	1
2004	6	1
2005	0	0
2006	0	0
2007	4	0
Total	16	1

Statistics accurate as of match played 18 November 2007

=== International goals ===
Goals for Senior National team

#	Date	Venue	Opponent	Score	Result	Competition
1	30 November 2003	Pamir Stadium, Dushanbe, Tajikistan	Bangladesh	1-0	2-0	2006 AFC Challenge Cup qualification
2	10 June 2004	Khalid ibn al-Walid Stadium, Homs, Syria	Syria	1-0	1-2	2006 AFC Challenge Cup qualification

== Honours ==
=== Club ===
Neftchi

- Uzbek League (1): 2001

Pakhtakor

- Uzbek Cup (1): 2009

Istiklol

- Tajik Supercup (1): 2016

=== Individual ===
- Gennadi Krasnitsky club: 121 goals (as of 30 October 2016)
