= Anvar Berdiev =

Uzbekistani footballer

Personal information
- Date of birth: 11 May 1978 (age 48)
- Place of birth: Uzbek SSR, Soviet Union
- Height: 1.78 m (5 ft 10 in)
- Position: Forward

Team information
- Current team: FC Turon (assistant coach)

Senior career*
| Years | Team | Apps | (Gls) |
| 1995 | Temiryo'lchi Qo'qon | | |
| 1995–1996 | Mash'al Mubarek | 48 | (11) |
| 1997–1999 | Nasaf Qarshi | 45 | (33) |
| 2000–2013 | Neftchi Farg'ona | 345 | (164) |
| 2013–2015 | Bunyodkor | 22 | (5) |
| 2015–2016 | Andijan | 33 | (11) |
| 2018 | Neftchi Farg'ona | 12 | (1) |
| 2019 | Istiqlol Fergana | 0 | (0) |

International career^{‡}
| 1998–2003 | Uzbekistan | 5 | (2) |

Managerial career
- 2019–: Istiqlol Fergana (assistant)
- * Club domestic league appearances and goals as of 30 August 2019 ‡ National team caps and goals as of 18 March 2014

Anvar Berdiev (born 11 May 1978) is a retired Uzbek professional footballer. He is currently an assistant coach in Istiqlol Fergana.

== Career ==
He began his career at Temiryo'lchi Qo'qon. In 2000, he moved to Neftchi Farg'ona. Playing for Neftchi, he won the Uzbek League in 2001.

He is the current top scorer in Uzbek League history with 224 goals (as of 30 November 2016). On 13 September 2012 he scored his 199th and 200th goals in the match against Qizilqum Zarafshon in the Uzbek League and became the second Uzbek player after Zafar Kholmurodov to score 200 goals in the league.

On 29 December 2012 IFFHS published a list of The World's most successful Top Division Goal Scorer among the still active Players. Anvar Berdiev ranked 18th in the list, having scored 205 goals in 433 matches in his career. On 31 December 2012, IFFHS published its updated list of The World's most successful Top Division Goal Scorers of all time. Anvar Berdiev ranked 296th in the list among 326 players with 240 goals.

On 28 June 2013 he moved to capital club Bunyodkor and signed a year and a half contract with the club. In summer 2015 he left Bunyodkor und signed a contract with FK Andijan. Playing 11 matches for Andijan, Berdiev scored 7 goals and made a significant contribution to help Andijan remain in the Uzbek League. He was Andijan's best goalscorer in the season with 7 goals.

In January 2018 Berdiev moved back to Neftchi. On 12 June 2018 he played hs 500th official match in Uzbekistan Super League, scoring goal for Neftchi on 88 Minute.

He played in 2019 for Uzbekistan Pro League club, Istiqlol Fergana. In August 2019 Berdiev announced that he finished his playing career and started his trainer career at Istiqlol Fergana as assistant coach to Sergey Lebedev.

== International ==
He made his debut for the national team on Friday 24 April 1998 in a match against Azerbaijan who won 2–1. He played 5 matches and scored 2 goals for the national team. He hasn't lost in non-league and non-national team competition any of the last 5 at home matches and hasn't won in UPFL any of the last 16 away from home matches.

== Honours ==
=== Club ===
Neftchi

- Uzbek League (1): 2001
- Uzbek League runner-up (5): 2000, 2002, 2003, 2004, 2006
- Uzbek Cup runner-up (2): 2001, 2002

Bunyodkor

- Uzbek League (1): 2013
- Uzbek Cup (1): 2013
- Uzbekistan Super Cup (1): 2014

=== Individual ===
- Uzbek League Topscorer: 2012 (19 goals)
- All time topscorer of Uzbekistan Super League: 225 goals
- Gennadi Krasnitsky club: 277 goals (as of 29 November 2018)

== Career statistics ==
As of 29 November 2018

| Club | Season | Apps | Goals |
|---|---|---|---|
| Mash'al Mubarek | 1995 | | 4 |
| Mash'al Mubarek | 1996 | | 7 |
| | Total | | 11 |
| Nasaf Qarshi | 1997 | | 12 |
| Nasaf Qarshi | 1998 | | 9 |
| Nasaf Qarshi | 1999 | | 12 |
| | Total | | 33 |
| Neftchi Farg'ona | 2000 | | 17 |
| Neftchi Farg'ona | 2001 | | 14 |
| Neftchi Farg'ona | 2002 | | 18 |
| Neftchi Farg'ona | 2003 | | 17 |
| Neftchi Farg'ona | 2000 | | 2 |
| Neftchi Farg'ona | 2005 | | 10 |
| Neftchi Farg'ona | 2006 | | 9 |
| Neftchi Farg'ona | 2007 | | 9 |
| Neftchi Farg'ona | 2008 | | 12 |
| Neftchi Farg'ona | 2009 | | 13 |
| Neftchi Farg'ona | 2010 | | 10 |
| Neftchi Farg'ona | 2011 | | 11 |
| Neftchi Farg'ona | 2012 | | 19 |
| Neftchi Farg'ona | 2013 | | 3 |
| | Total | | 164 |
| Bunyodkor | 2013 | | 4 |
| Bunyodkor | 2014 | | 1 |
| | Total | | 5 |
| FK Andijan | 2015 | 11 | 7 |
| FK Andijan | 2016 | 22 | 4 |
| | Total | 33 | 11 |
| Neftchi Farg'ona | 2018 | 12 | 1 |
| Career Total | | | 225 |
