= Marat Bikmaev =

Uzbek footballer (born 1986)

Marat Bikmaev Марат Бикмаев
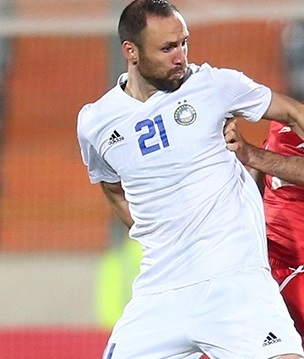

Personal information
- Full name: Marat Rifkatovich Bikmaev
- Date of birth: 1 January 1986 (age 40)
- Place of birth: Tashkent, Uzbekistan
- Height: 1.78 m (5 ft 10 in)
- Position: Forward

Youth career
- Chagatay

Senior career*
Years	Team	Apps	(Gls)
2001–2004	Pakhtakor Tashkent	39	(14)
2004–2005	Krylia Sovetov	5	(0)
2006–2007	Rubin Kazan	0	(0)
2008–2010	Spartak Nalchik	48	(3)
2010–2012	Alania Vladikavkaz	56	(13)
2012–2013	Aktobe	21	(0)
2014–2018	Lokomotiv Tashkent	112	(65)
2019	Pakhtakor Tashkent	23	(8)
2020–2021	Lokomotiv Tashkent	31	(7)
2022	Sogdiana Jizzakh	10	(0)
2022	Dinamo Samarqand	11	(8)
2023	Lokomotiv Tashkent	9	(2)

International career
2004–2019	Uzbekistan	56	(9)
- * Club domestic league appearances and goals

Marat Rifkatovich Bikmaev (born 1 January 1986) is an Uzbek former footballer who played as a striker.

== Career ==
=== Club ===
==== Aktobe ====
On 20 June 2012 FC Aktobe announced the signing of Bikmaev. His debut club goal was in his first official match in Kazakhstan Cup on 20 June 2012 against FC Lashyn.

=== International ===
As a member of the national team since his debut in 2004, he has played 38 matches and scored 5 goals (as of 16 November 2016).

== Career statistics ==
=== Club ===
As of match played 29 March 2023

Club	Season	League			National Cup		League Cup		Continental		Other		Total	
Club	Season	Division	Apps	Goals	Apps	Goals	Apps	Goals	Apps	Goals	Apps	Goals	Apps	Goals
Pakhtakor Tashkent	2001	Uzbek League	0	0			-		-		-		0	0
Pakhtakor Tashkent	2002	Uzbek League	7	1			-		-		-		7	1
Pakhtakor Tashkent	2003	Uzbek League	24	9			-				-		24	9
Pakhtakor Tashkent	2004	Uzbek League	8	4			-				-		8	4
Pakhtakor Tashkent	Total		39	14			-	-			-	-	39	14
Krylia Sovetov	2004	Russian Premier League	0	0	0	0	-		-		-		0	0
Krylia Sovetov	2005	Russian Premier League	5	0	2	0	-		1	0	-		8	0
Krylia Sovetov	Total		5	0	2	0	-	-	1	0	-	-	8	0
Rubin Kazan	2006	Russian Premier League	0	0	1	0	-		0	0	-		1	0
Rubin Kazan	2007	Russian Premier League	0	0	0	0	-		0	0	-		0	0
Rubin Kazan	Total		0	0	1	0	-	-	0	0	-	-	1	0
Spartak Nalchik	2008	Russian Premier League	13	2	1	1	-		-		-		14	3
Spartak Nalchik	2009	Russian Premier League	23	0	1	0	-		-		-		24	0
Spartak Nalchik	2010	Russian Premier League	12	1	1	0	-		-		-		13	1
Spartak Nalchik	Total		48	3	3	1	-	-	-	-	-	-	51	4
Alania Vladikavkaz	2010	Russian Premier League	13	2	4	0	-		-		-		17	2
Alania Vladikavkaz	2011–12	Russian National League	43	11	1	0	-		-		-		44	11
Alania Vladikavkaz	Total		56	13	5	0	-	-	-	-	-	-	59	13
Aktobe	2012	Kazakhstan Premier League	9	0	5	1	-		6	2	-		20	3
Aktobe	2013	Kazakhstan Premier League	12	0	1	0	-		-		-		13	0
Aktobe	Total		21	0	6	1	-	-	6	2	-	-	35	3
Lokomotiv Tashkent	2014	Uzbek League	4	2	1	0	-		–		–		5	2
Lokomotiv Tashkent	2015	Uzbek League	27	11	3	3	-		3	2	1	0	34	16
Lokomotiv Tashkent	2016	Uzbek League	27	12	3	0	-		10	1	–		40	13
Lokomotiv Tashkent	2017	Uzbek League	25	26	6	4	-		6	5	0	0	37	35
Lokomotiv Tashkent	2018	Uzbek League	29	14	1	0	-		6	1	0	0	26	14
Lokomotiv Tashkent	Total		112	65	14	7	-	-	25	9	1	0	152	81
Pakhtakor Tashkent	2019	Uzbekistan Super League	23	9	3	0	1	0	8	4	-		35	13
Lokomotiv Tashkent	2020	Uzbekistan Super League	20	6	1	0	-		1	0	-		22	6
Lokomotiv Tashkent	2021	Uzbekistan Super League	11	1	2	1	-						13	2
Lokomotiv Tashkent	Total		31	7	3	1	-	-	1	0	-	-	34	8
Sogdiana Jizzakh	2022	Uzbekistan Super League	10	0	2	0	-		2	0	-		14	0
Dinamo Samarqand	2022	Uzbekistan Super League	11	8	0	0	-						11	8
Lokomotiv Tashkent	2023	Uzbekistan Pro League	1	0	0	0	-						1	0
Career total			377	121	37	10	1	0	43	15	1	0	441	144

=== International ===
Uzbekistan national team
Year	Apps	Goals
2004	6	1
2005	5	0
2006	2	0
2007	5	0
2008	2	0
2009	1	0
2010	0	0
2011	4	1
2012	3	0
2013	2	0
2014	0	0
2015	2	0
2016	7	3
2017	6	0
2018	8	4
2019	3	0
Total	56	9

Statistics accurate as of match played 21 January 2019

=== International goals ===
Scores and results list Uzbekistan's goal tally first.

No	Date	Venue	Opponent	Score	Result	Competition
1.	8 September 2004	Ahmed bin Ali Stadium, Al Rayyan, Qatar	Palestine	3–0	3–0	2006 FIFA World Cup qualification
2.	23 July 2011	Pakhtakor Markaziy Stadium, Tashkent, Uzbekistan	Kyrgyzstan	2–0	4–0	2014 FIFA World Cup qualification
3.	24 July 2016	Milliy Stadium, Tashkent, Uzbekistan	Iraq	1–0	2–1	Friendly
4.	11 October 2016	Milliy Stadium, Tashkent, Uzbekistan	China	1–0	2–0	2018 FIFA World Cup qualification
5.	15 November 2016	Seoul World Cup Stadium, Seoul, South Korea	South Korea	1–0	1–2	2018 FIFA World Cup qualification
6.	6 September 2018	Milliy Stadium, Tashkent, Uzbekistan	Syria	1–0	1–1	Friendly
7.	13 October 2018	Milliy Stadium, Tashkent, Uzbekistan	North Korea	1–0	2–0	Friendly
8.	13 October 2018	Milliy Stadium, Tashkent, Uzbekistan	North Korea	2–0	2–0	Friendly
9.	16 October 2018	Milliy Stadium, Tashkent, Uzbekistan	Qatar	2–0	2–0	Friendly

== Honours ==
=== Club ===
Pakhtakor

- Uzbek League (3): 2002, 2003, 2004
- Uzbek Cup (3): 2002, 2003, 2004
- AFC Champions League semifinal (2): 2003, 2004

Alania Vladikavkaz

- Russian Cup runners-up (1): 2010–11
- Russian Football National League runners-up (1): 2011–12

Aktobe

- Kazakhstan Premier League (1): 2013

Lokomotiv

- Uzbek League (2): 2016, 2017, 2018
- Uzbek League runners-up (2): 2014, 2015
- Uzbek Cup (2): 2014, 2016

=== Individual ===
- Uzbekistan Player of the Year: 2017
- Uzbek League Top Scorer: 2017 (27 goals)
