= Gennadi Krasnitsky club =

Club for Uzbek footballers who scored 100 or more club goals

Gennadi Krasnitsky club (Uzbek: Геннадий Красницкий тўпурарлар клуби or Gennadi Krasnitsky to'purarlar klubi, Russian: Клуб Геннадия Красницкого) is a list of Uzbek football players that have scored 100 or more goals during their professional career. This club is named after first Uzbekistani player in Soviet Union who scored over 100 goals - Gennadi Krasnitsky.

The club was founded by Uzbekistan Football Association in August 2010 in memory of legendary striker of Pakhtakor and with intention to stimulate youth for achievements in football.

The first player who scored its first 100 goals in Uzbekistan Super League was Oleg Shatskikh. He needed for that six seasons. The first player who scored its 200 goals in League was Zafar Kholmurodov.

Anvar Berdiev is leading the goalscorer's list with 277 goals (as of 2 December 2019). In 2016 season Anvar Berdiev playing for Andijan scored another 4 goals in League matches, he scored in Uzbekistan Super League totally 225 goals. Artur Gevorkyan is first foreign footballer who entered this goalscorer's club. Gevorkyan scored his over 100 goals in April 2015.

== Goals ==
The following goals are counted:

- Championship - goals scored in Uzbek League, top division of Uzbek football
- Cup - goals scored in Uzbek Cup
- Asian Cup - goals scored in AFC Champions League and AFC Cup, the international club tournaments of AFC
- National team - goals scored for national team

== Gennadi Krasnitsky club ==
As of 2 December 2019

#	Name	Years	League	Cup	National	Asian Cups	Total	Ref
1	Anvar Berdiev	1995–2019	225	43	2	7	277	
2	Zafar Kholmurodov	1997–2012	200	32		6	238	
3	Anvar Soliev	1996–2015	164	36	8	22	230	
4	Shuhrat Mirkholdirshoev	2000–2014	194	26		2	222	
5	Jafar Irismetov	1993–2012	174	24	15		213	
6	Ravshan Bozorov	1992–2007	171	23	5	7	206	
7	Bakhtiyor Hamidullaev	1997–2011	178	13	3	1	195	
8	Oybek Usmankhojaev	1992–2005	157	35	1	1	194	
9	Umid Isoqov	1994–2010	171	10	3	3	187	
10	Rustam Durmonov	1992–2002	133	25	4	10	172	
11	Farid Khabibullin	1992–2004	131	35			166	
12	**Server Djeparov**	2000–present	113	1	25	19	158	
13	Numon Khasanov	1992–2009	125	22	5	1	153	
14	Mukhtor Kurbonov	1993–2009	128	19			147	
15	Zayniddin Tadjiyev	2001-2015	102	28	3	13	146	
16	Oleg Shatskikh	1993–2003	105	22	9	8	144	
17	Shuhrat Rahmonqulov	1992–2005	108	19	5	2	134	
18	**Artur Gevorkyan**	2006-present	105	17		9	131	
19	Nagmetulla Kutibayev	1992–2007	106	17	5	3	131	
20	**Nosirbek Otakuziev**	2003–present	117	4		5	126	
21	Shukhrat Maqsudov	1991-2000	82	21	11	9	123	
22	Mirjalol Kasymov	1986-2005	58	30	31	4	123	
23	**Akmal Kholmatov**	1998–present	89	21	3	8	121	
24	**Shakhboz Erkinov**	2003–present	101	11		3	115	
25	Vali Keldiev	1992–2006	104	9		2	115	
26	Leonid Koshelev	1997-2015	86	11	6	11	114	
27	Sergey Ni	1991-2005	87	18		3	108	
28	**Igor Taran**	2003–present	95	8		3	106	
29	Sobir Khodiev	1989-2002	77	22		7	106	
30	Dilshod Urmanov	1992-2006	86	17			103	
31	Ilhom Mo'minjonov	1998-2009	91	11			102	
32	Azamat Abduraimov	1983-2001	72	17	10	2	101	
33	Marsel Idiatullin	2002-2010	89	12			101	

- Players whose name is listed in **bold** are active players

== See also ==
- Grigory Fedotov club
- Club 200 of Berador Abduraimov
- Uzbekistan Super League Top Scorer
- Uzbekistan Footballer of the Year
- Uzbekistan Super League
