= Umid Isoqov =

Uzbek former professional footballer (born 1978)

Umid Isoqov Умид Исаков
Personal information
- Date of birth: 22 December 1978 (age 47)
- Place of birth: Uzbek SSR, Soviet Union
- Height: 1.76 m (5 ft 9 in)
- Position: Striker

Senior career*
Years	Team	Apps	(Gls)
1997–2004	Neftchi Farg'ona	210	(139)
2005	Pakhtakor	6	(2)
2005	FK Samarqand-Dinamo	11	(6)
2006	FK Andijan	22	(9)
2007	Nasaf Qarshi	22	(7)
2008	Qizilqum Zarafshon	17	(7)
2009	Xorazm FK Urganch	7	(2)
2010	Neftchi Farg'ona	5	(2)

International career^{‡}
2000–2001	Uzbekistan	8	(3)
- * Club domestic league appearances and goals ‡ National team caps and goals as of 1 November 2008

Umid Isoqov (born 22 December 1978) is an Uzbek former professional footballer.

== Career ==
Isoqov played for most of his playing career for Neftchi Farg'ona and won the Uzbek League in 2001. He played 215 matches for Neftchi, scoring 141 goals. In 2001 Isoqov won the Uzbekistan championship with Neftchi and finished runners-up in the Uzbek Cup. He scored 28 goals and became League Topscorer. He was Neftchi's best goalscorer in the League for five seasons, three seasons of them in a row 1999-2001. Isoqov is the second best goalscorer in the club's history in League matches after Anvar Berdiev.

== International ==
He made his debut in the national team on 29 February 2000 in a match against Mongolia, ended with an 8:1 victory. He played 8 matches and scored 3 goals.

== Career statistics ==
=== International goals ===
#	Date	Venue	Opponent	Score	Result	Competition
1.	3 September 2000	Shanghai Stadium, Shanghai, China	Thailand	4–2	Loss	Four Nations Cup
2.	15 February 2001	Spartak Stadium, Varna, Bulgaria	Azerbaijan	2–1	Win	Friendly
3.	15 February 2001	Spartak Stadium, Varna, Bulgaria	Azerbaijan	2–1	Win	Friendly
Correct as of 7 October 2015

== Honours ==
=== Club ===
- Uzbek League (1): 2001
- Uzbek League runner-up (7): 1997, 1998, 1999, 2000, 2002, 2003, 2004
- Uzbek Cup runner-up (4): 1997, 1998, 2001, 2002

=== Individual ===
- Uzbekistan Footballer of the Year 3rd: 2001
- Uzbek League Top Scorer (2): 1999, 2001
- Gennadi Krasnitsky club: 188 goals
