= Shuhrat Mirkholdirshoev =

Uzbekistani footballer

Personal information
- Date of birth: 5 March 1982 (age 44)
- Place of birth: Uzbek SSR, Soviet Union
- Height: 1.70 m (5 ft 7 in)
- Position: Striker

Senior career*
Years	Team	Apps	(Gls)
1999	Metallurg Bekabad	15	(2)
2000–2004	Navbahor Namangan	144	(127)
2005–2007	Mash'al Mubarek	70	(30)
2008	Navbahor Namangan	27	(13)
2009–2010	Andijon	53	(20)
2011–2013	Nasaf Qarshi	39	(6)
2014	Andijon	5	(0)

International career^{‡}
2000–2002	Uzbekistan	3	(0)
- * Club domestic league appearances and goals as of 1 April 2021 ‡ National team caps and goals as of 1 November 2008

Shuhrat Mirkholdirshoev (Uzbek: Шухрат Мирхолдиршоев) (born 5 March 1982), is a former Uzbek professional footballer who played as a forward. He won the IFFHS World's Most Effective Top Division Goal Scorer of the Year in 2004.

== Club career ==
Mirkholdirshoev played for different clubs in his career. He is 3rd top scoring player after Anvar Berdiev and Zafar Kholmurodov in League matches with 195 goals, entering Gennadi Krasnitsky club top scorer's club. Totally he scored 222 goals in all competitions (as of 7 November 2014).

== International career ==
He made his debut in the national team on 1 September 2000 and played 3 matches.

== Honours ==
=== Club ===
Nasaf Qarshi

- Uzbek League runner-up: 2011
- Uzbek Cup runner-up: 2011

=== Individual ===
- Uzbek League Top Scorer (2): 2003, 2004
- Gennadi Krasnitsky club: 222 goals
- IFFHS World's Most Effective Top Division Goal Scorer of the Year (1): 2004
