= Aleksey Jdanov =

Uzbekistani footballer

Personal information
- Full name: Aleksey Alekseevich Jdanov
- Date of birth: 1 March 1976 (age 50)
- Place of birth: Soviet Union
- Height: 1.82 m (5 ft 11 1/2 in)
- Position: Left-half

Senior career*
Years	Team	Apps	(Gls)
1998	Sogdiana Jizak		
2002–2003	Lada Togliatti	73	(6)
2004–2006	KAMAZ Naberezhnye Chelny	52	(5)
2006	Fakel Voronezh	13	(0)
2007	Spartak Tambov	10	(2)
2008	OTMK Olmaliq		
- * Club domestic league appearances and goals

Aleksey Alekseevich Jdanov (Russian: Алексей Алексеевич Жданов) (born 1 March 1976) is an Uzbekistani football player.

Jdanov was the fourth-leading goal-scorer in the Uzbek League, with 18 goals, during the 1998 season. He later played for FC Lada Togliatti, FC KAMAZ Naberezhnye Chelny and FC Fakel Voronezh in the Russian First Division. After spending 2007 with FC Spartak Tambov, Jdanov returned the Uzbek League with OTMK Olmaliq in 2008.
