= 1995 Uzbek League =

Uzbek League
- Season: 1995
- Champions: Neftchi Farg'ona

The 1995 Uzbek League season was the fourth edition of top-level football in Uzbekistan since independence from the Soviet Union in 1992.

== Overview ==
It was contested by 16 teams, and Neftchi Farg'ona won the championship.

== League standings ==
Pos	Team	Pld	W	D	L	GF	GA	GD	Pts
1	Neftchi Farg'ona	30	24	4	2	83	32	+51	76
2	MHSK Tashkent	30	23	5	2	67	19	+48	74
3	Navbahor Namangan	30	23	3	4	69	23	+46	72
4	Pakhtakor Tashkent	30	20	5	5	67	27	+40	65
5	Nurafshon Buxoro	30	13	1	16	39	26	+13	40
6	Politotdel Tashkent	30	11	6	13	36	51	−15	39
7	Atlaschi Marg'ilon	30	11	4	15	36	48	−12	37
8	Navro'z Andijan	30	10	7	13	38	43	−5	37
9	Sogdiana Jizzakh	30	11	3	16	43	50	−7	36
10	Yangiyer	30	10	5	15	36	44	−8	35
11	Dinamo Samarqand	30	10	5	15	24	37	−13	35
12	Termez	30	10	5	15	34	50	−16	35
13	Traktor Tashkent	30	9	8	13	30	43	−13	35
14	Mash'al Mubarek	30	8	5	17	18	58	−40	29
15	Temiryo'lchi Qo'qon	30	6	3	21	26	67	−41	21
16	Chirchiq	30	3	7	20	21	52	−31	16
