= Dmitry An =

Uzbekistani footballer)

Personal information
- Full name: Dmitry Ivanovich An
- Date of birth: 2 May 1939 (age 87)
- Place of birth: Uzbek Soviet Socialist Republic
- Date of death: 20 May 2018 (aged 79)
- Place of death: Uzbekistan
- Position: Forward

Senior career*
Years	Team	Apps	(Gls)
1962–1963	Pakhtakor	2	(0)
1964–1969	Dustlik	183	(32)
- * Club domestic league appearances and goals

Dmitry Ivanovich An (Russian: Дмитрий Ан; 2 May 1939 – 20 May 2018) was an Uzbekistani footballer.

== Life and career ==
An was born on 2 May 1939 in the Uzbek Soviet Socialist Republic. He grew up in the Tashkent Region, Uzbekistan. As a youth player, An joined the youth academy of Uzbekistani side Pakhtakor. He became the first ethnic Korean player to graduate from their youth academy. He started his senior career with Uzbekistani side Pakhtakor. He became the first ethnic Korean player to play in the Soviet top flight. In 1964, he signed for Uzbekistani side Dustlik before retiring from professional football.

An mainly operated as a forward. He was known for his heading ability. He was described as "considered the best scorer of high balls in the All-Union Championship".

He obtained a USSR Master of Sport certification. He died on 20 May 2018 in Uzbekistan. An was of Korean descent. He was the brother of Soviet Union international Mikhail An.
