= FC Surkhon =

Surkhon Termiz Surxon Termiz
- Full name: Surkhon Termiz Futbol Klubi
- Founded: 1968; 58 years ago
- Ground: Surkhon arena
- Capacity: 10,600
- Manager: Fevzi Davletov
- League: Uzbekistan Super League
- 2025: 10th of 14
| Home colours | Away colours |

Surkhon Termiz (Uzbek: Surxon Termiz Futbol Klubi) is an Uzbek professional football club based in the city of Termez. It was founded in 1968. Bakhtiyor Fazilov is the club owner.

== History ==
=== Domestic history ===
| Season | League | | | | | | | | | Uzbek Cup | Top goalscorer | | Manager |
| Season | Div. | Pos. | Pl. | W | D | L | GS | GA | P | Uzbek Cup | Name | League | Manager |
|---|---|---|---|---|---|---|---|---|---|---|---|---|---|
| 1992 | 1st | 17th | 32 | 0 | 12 | 20 | 15 | 64 | 12 | | | | |
| 1993 | 2nd | 2nd | 30 | 20 | 4 | 6 | 72 | 21 | 44 | | | | |
| 1994 | 1st | 10th | 30 | 11 | 4 | 15 | 42 | 51 | 26 | | | | |
| 1995 | 1st | 12th | 30 | 10 | 5 | 15 | 34 | 50 | 35 | | | | |
| 1996 | 1st | 16th | 30 | 4 | 7 | 19 | 29 | 70 | 19 | | | | |
| 1997 | 1st | 11th | 34 | 11 | 7 | 16 | 39 | 60 | 40 | | | | |
| 1998 | 1st | 10th | 30 | 12 | 4 | 14 | 50 | 62 | 40 | | | | |
| 1999 | 1st | 15th | 30 | 7 | 9 | 15 | 44 | 54 | 30 | | | | |
| 2000 | 1st | 9th | 38 | 15 | 7 | 16 | 69 | 79 | 52 | | | | |
| 2001 | 1st | 15th | 34 | 12 | 2 | 20 | 42 | 71 | 38 | | | | |
| 2002 | 1st | 9th | 30 | 10 | 3 | 17 | 38 | 54 | 33 | | | | |
| 2003 | 1st | 9th | 30 | 10 | 4 | 16 | 32 | 56 | 34 | | | | |
| 2004 | 1st | 12th | 26 | 7 | 2 | 17 | 24 | 55 | 20 | | | | |
| 2005 | 2nd | 8th | 34 | 17 | 2 | 15 | 47 | 57 | 53 | | | | |
| 2006 | 2nd | 19th | 38 | 8 | 5 | 25 | 34 | 79 | 23 | | | | |
| 2017 | 2nd | 4th | 34 | 18 | 6 | 10 | 57 | 32 | 60 | | (Uzbekistan) Akmal Abdurahmanov | 15 | |
| 2018 | 2nd | 4th | 32 | 15 | 8 | 9 | 62 | 36 | 53 | Round of 16 | | | |
| 2019 | 1st | 6th | 26 | 10 | 5 | 11 | 26 | 33 | 35 | Quarterfinal | (Uzbekistan) Abdul Yusupov | 8 | (Uzbekistan) Andrei Miklyaev |
| 2020 | 1st | 12th | 26 | 4 | 5 | 17 | 17 | 44 | 17 | Round of 16 | (Ukraine) Oleksandr Kasyan | 8 | (Uzbekistan) Bakhrom Khaydarov (Russia) Alexander Khomyakov (Uzbekistan) Ravshan Khaydarov |
| 2021 | 1st | 10th | 26 | 7 | 4 | 15 | 17 | 43 | 25 | Quarterfinal | (Uzbekistan) Murodbek Bobojonov | 5 | (Uzbekistan) Rifat Akramkhujaev |
| 2022 | 1st | 11th | 26 | 7 | 5 | 14 | 25 | 44 | 26 | Round of 16 | (Spain) Rubén Sánchez | 8 | (Spain) Jordi Fabregat (Spain) Ángel López (Spain) Miguel Álvarez |

== Managers ==
| Period | ! Head coach |
|---|---|
| 1968–1970 | (Soviet Union) Viktor Borisov |
| 1971 | (Soviet Union) Aleksey Gubin |
| 1972–1973 | (Soviet Union) Vladimir Desyatichko |
| 1974 | (Soviet Union) Viktor Tikhonov |
| 1975 | (Soviet Union) Yakov Aranovich |
| 1976–1977 | (Soviet Union) Marc Tunis |
| 1977–1980 | (Soviet Union) Viktor Tikhonov |
| 1981–1983 | No coach |
| 1984 | (Soviet Union) Vladimir Jukovskiy |
| 1985–1986 | No coach |
| 1987–1990 | (Soviet Union) Taymuraz Khabaev |
| 1991 | (Soviet Union) Munir Salixov |
| 1992 | (Uzbekistan) Batir Kashkenbaev |
| 1993–1995 | No coach |
| 1996 | (Uzbekistan) Batir Kashkenbaev |
| 1996 | (Uzbekistan) Владимир Жуковский |
| 1997 | (Uzbekistan) Тагаймурад Хошбаков |
| 1998 | (Uzbekistan) Тулагян Исаков |
| 1998 | (Uzbekistan) Батыр Кашкенбаев |
| 1999 | (Uzbekistan) Берадор Абдураимов |
| 2000–2009 | No coach |
| 2010 | (Uzbekistan) Ravshan Durmonov |
| 2011–2012 | (Uzbekistan) Furkat Mustafakulov |
| 2013 | (Uzbekistan) Batir Kashkenbaev |
| 2014 | (Uzbekistan) Furkat Mustafakulov |
| 2015–2016 | (Uzbekistan) Ravshan Durmonov |
| 2016–2017 | (Uzbekistan) Obid Xudoyorov |
| 2017 | (Uzbekistan) Sergey Kovshov |
| 2018 | (Uzbekistan) Abdusamad Durmonov |
| 2018–2019 | (Uzbekistan) Dilshod Nuraliev |
| 2019–??? | (Uzbekistan) Andrey Miklyaev |
| 2022– | (Spain) Ángel López Pérez |

== Players ==
As of 29 July 2026

Note: Flags indicate national team as defined under FIFA eligibility rules; some limited exceptions apply. Players may hold more than one non-FIFA nationality.

| No. | Pos. | Nation | Player |
|---|---|---|---|
| 2 | DF | UZB | Behruz Karimov |
| 5 | DF | RUS | Dzhamaldin Khodzhaniyazov |
| 6 | DF | UZB | Behzod Shamsiyev |
| 7 | DF | UZB | Dostonbek Tursunov |
| 8 | MF | UZB | Humoyun Sherbutaev |
| 10 | FW | UZB | Sunnatilla Abdullajonov |
| 11 | FW | NGA | Richard Friday |
| 14 | MF | UZB | Tohirjon Ashurboev |
| 15 | MF | UZB | Diyor Ramazonov |
| 16 | GK | UZB | Dilshod Yo'ldoshev |
| 17 | MF | UZB | Sarvar Abduhamidov |

| No. | Pos. | Nation | Player |
|---|---|---|---|
| 18 | MF | UZB | Behruz Uktamov |
| 19 | FW | UZB | Farruhjon Kodirov |
| 21 | MF | GEO | Tornike Dzebniauri |
| 22 | DF | UZB | Javohir Juraev |
| 23 | FW | UZB | Kamronbek Yusupov |
| 25 | GK | UZB | Otabek Boymurodov |
| 26 | DF | UZB | Behruz Shukurullaev |
| 27 | DF | UZB | Muhammadali Musahonov |
| 32 | MF | UZB | Boburjon Rahimjonov |
| 66 | DF | UZB | Behruz Shaydulov |
| 86 | GK | UZB | Davron Merganov |

=== Out on loan ===
Note: Flags indicate national team as defined under FIFA eligibility rules; some limited exceptions apply. Players may hold more than one non-FIFA nationality.

| No. | Pos. | Nation | Player |
|---|---|---|---|
| 20 | MF | UZB | Sardorbek Mahmudov (at FC Kattaqorgon until 31 December 2026) |
| 77 | MF | UZB | Asadbek Karimov (at Metallurg Bekabad until 31 December 2026) |
| — | DF | UZB | Sunnatillokh Khamidzhonov (at Khorazm until 31 December 2026) |

| No. | Pos. | Nation | Player |
|---|---|---|---|
| — | FW | UZB | Abdugafur Haydarov (at Olympic MobiUz until 31 December 2026) |
| — | FW | UZB | Muhammadali Abdurahmonov (at Shurtan until 31 December 2026) |
| — | FW | NGA | Stephen Chinedu (at Pakhtakor until 31 December 2026) |

== Notable players ==
- (Soviet Union) Abdusamad Durmonov
- (Soviet Union) Vladimir Grishchenko
- (Soviet Union) Rustam Durmonov
- (Soviet Union) Vladimir Gryngazov
- (Soviet Union) Marat Kabaev
- (Soviet Union) Vladimir Dergach
- (Soviet Union) Nikolay Maslov
- (Soviet Union) Gennady Mikhaylutsa
- (Soviet Union) Oleg Morozov
- (Soviet Union) Yuri Sargsyan
- (Soviet Union) Asan Mustafayev
- (Soviet Union) Albert Tsaraev
- (Brazil) Dougllas Nacsimento Do Trugilho
- (Brazil) Lucas Oliveria De Cunha
- (Serbia) Darko Stanojević
- (Serbia) Vladimir Bubanja
- (Ukraine) Oleksandr Kasyan
