= Jafar Irismetov =

Uzbekistani footballer and coach

Jafar Tursumbaevich Irismetov
Personal information
- Date of birth: 23 August 1976 (age 50)
- Place of birth: Yangibazar, Uzbek SSR, Soviet Union
- Height: 1.73 m (5 ft 8 in)
- Position: Forward

Team information
- Current team: Oqtepa (assistant coach)

Senior career*
Years	Team	Apps	(Gls)
1993–1997	Dustlik Tashkent	125	(81)
1998	Panathinaikos	1	(0)
1998	Dustlik Tashkent	10	(8)
1998	Chernomorets Novorossiysk	7	(1)
1999	Samarkand	27	(19)
2000	Dustlik Tashkent	37	(45)
2001	Spartak Moscow	8	(0)
2001	→ Slavia Mozyr (loan)	9	(3)
2002–2003	Anzhi Makhachkala	11	(0)
2003	→ Pakhtakor Tashkent (loan)	5	(3)
2003	→ Kryvbas Kryvyi Rih (loan)	11	(1)
2003	→ Kryvbas-2 Kryvyi Rih (loan)	1	(1)
2004–2005	Kairat Almaty	49	(22)
2006–2007	Alma-Ata	52	(34)
2008	Aktobe	15	(2)
2008	Alma-Ata	12	(4)
2009	Andijan	2	(0)
2009	Liaoning Hongyun	2	(0)
2010	Dinamo Samarqand	24	(11)
2011	Shurtan Guzar	11	(3)
2011	Qizilqum Zarafshon	12	(3)
2012	Navbahor Namangan	14	(1)
Total		445	(242)

International career^{‡}
1997–2007	Uzbekistan	36	(15)
2013–	Uzbekistan (beach soccer)	5	(5)

Managerial career
- 2014: NBU Osiyo
- 2016–: Oqtepa (assistant)
- * Club domestic league appearances and goals as of 29 May 2010 ‡ National team caps and goals as of 31 July 2013

Jafar Irismetov (Russian: Джафар Ирисметов) (born 23 August 1976) is a former Uzbekistan footballer and coach.

== Playing career ==
On 29 December 2012 IFFHS published list of The World's most successful Top Division Goal Scorer among the still active Players. Jafar Irismetov ranked 8th in list, scoring 240 goals in 441 matches in his career.

After 2012 season played for Navbahor Namangan he decided to finish his playing career. Early in 2013 he announced to play beach soccer and participated in 2013 FIFA Beach Soccer World Cup qualification of (AFC) for Uzbekistan. He scored 5 goals in tournament. On 23 March 2015 in 2015 AFC Beach Soccer Championship in Qatar, Irismetov scored a hat-trick in the group stage match against UAE, which ended with a 6–5 win for the Uzbek side.

== International ==
He played 36 matches and scored 15 goals for the Uzbekistan between 1997 and 2007.

== Managing career ==
Irismetov started managing career in 2014. In January 2014 he was named as head coach of NBU Osiyo, club in Uzbekistan First League. On 31 May 2014 he resigned his post and left the club.

In January 2016 he joined coaching stuff of Oqtepa.

== Career statistics ==
=== International ===
Appearances and goals by national team and year
National team	Year	Apps	Goals
Uzbekistan	1997	8	1
Uzbekistan	1998	2	0
Uzbekistan	1999	6	2
Uzbekistan	2000	4	2
Uzbekistan	2001	13	10
Uzbekistan	2007	3	0
Total		36	15

Scores and results list Uzbekistan's goal tally first, score column indicates score after each Irismetov goal.

List of international goals scored by Jafar Irismetov
No.	Date	Venue	Opponent	Score	Result	Competition	Ref.
1	25 May 1997	Pakhtakor Central Stadium, Tashkent, Uzbekistan	Cambodia	5–0	6–0	1998 FIFA World Cup qualification	
2	23 November 1999	Tahnoun bin Mohammed Stadium, Al Ain, UAE	Sri Lanka	1–0	6–0	2000 AFC Asian Cup qualification	
3	23 November 1999	Tahnoun bin Mohammed Stadium, Al Ain, UAE	Sri Lanka	2–0	6–0	2000 AFC Asian Cup qualification	
4	29 February 2000	NBU Stadium, Tashkent, Uzbekistan	Mongolia	4–1	8–1	Friendly	
5	3 September 2000	Shanghai Stadium, Shanghai, China	Thailand	1–4	2–4	Friendly	
6	23 April 2001	Pakhtakor Central Stadium, Tashkent, Uzbekistan	Chinese Taipei	1–0	7–0	2002 FIFA World Cup qualification	
7	23 April 2001	Pakhtakor Central Stadium, Tashkent, Uzbekistan	Chinese Taipei	3–0	7–0	2002 FIFA World Cup qualification	
8	23 April 2001	Pakhtakor Central Stadium, Tashkent, Uzbekistan	Chinese Taipei	6–0	7–0	2002 FIFA World Cup qualification	
9	23 April 2001	Pakhtakor Central Stadium, Tashkent, Uzbekistan	Chinese Taipei	7–0	7–0	2002 FIFA World Cup qualification	
10	3 May 2001	Amman International Stadium, Amman, Jordan	Turkmenistan	2–0	5–2	2002 FIFA World Cup qualification	
11	5 May 2001	Amman International Stadium, Amman, Jordan	Chinese Taipei	1–0	4–0	2002 FIFA World Cup qualification	
12	5 May 2001	Amman International Stadium, Amman, Jordan	Chinese Taipei	4–0	4–0	2002 FIFA World Cup qualification	
13	26 August 2001	Pakhtakor Central Stadium, Tashkent, Uzbekistan	Qatar	1–0	2–1	2002 FIFA World Cup qualification	
14	8 September 2001	Pakhtakor Central Stadium, Tashkent, Uzbekistan	Oman	1–0	5–0	2002 FIFA World Cup qualification	
15	8 September 2001	Pakhtakor Central Stadium, Tashkent, Uzbekistan	Oman	5–0	5–0	2002 FIFA World Cup qualification	

== Honours ==
=== Club ===
Dustlik

- Uzbek League (1): 2000
- Uzbek Cup (1): 2000

Spartak Moscow

- Russian Football Premier League (1): 2001
- Commonwealth of Independent States Cup (1): 2001

Pakhtakor

- Uzbek League (1): 2003

Kayrat Almaty

- Kazakhstan Premier League (1): 2004

Almaty

- Kazakhstan Cup (1): 2006

Liaoning FC

- China League One: 2009

=== Individual ===
- Uzbekistan Footballer of the Year: 2000
- Uzbekistan Footballer of the Year 2nd: 1997
- Uzbek League Top Scorer (3): 1996, 1997, 2000
- CIS Cup top goalscorer: 2001 (shared)
- Kazakhstan Premier League Top Scorer (2): 2006, 2007
- Gennadi Krasnitsky club member: 203 goals
