= Oleg Shatskikh =

Uzbekistani footballer

Personal information
- Full name: Oleg Aleksandrovich Shatskikh
- Date of birth: 15 October 1974 (age 52)
- Place of birth: Tashkent, Uzbek SSR, Soviet Union
- Position: Forward

Senior career*
Years	Team	Apps	(Gls)
1992	Pakhtakor Tashkent	2	(2)
1992–1995	Politotdel	75	(63)
1995–1997	Navbahor Namangan	64	(60)
1998	FC Dustlik	3	(3)
1999–2001	FK Samarqand-Dinamo	2	(1)
2003	FC Dustlik	13	(0)
Total		149	(129)

International career
1996–1997	Uzbekistan	11	(9)
- * Club domestic league appearances and goals

Oleg Aleksandrovich Shatskikh (Russian: Олег Александрович Шацких; born 15 October 1974), is an Uzbek former professional footballer who played as a forward in the Uzbek League. His brother Maksim Shatskikh is also a former footballer.

== International career ==
Shatskikh made his debut in the Uzbekistan national team on 11 September 1996 and played 11 matches, scoring 9 goals.

== Honours ==
Pakhtakor Tashkent

- Uzbek League: 1992

Navbahor Namangan

- Uzbek League: 1996
- Uzbek Cup: 1995

Individual

- Uzbek League Top Scorer: 1995 (26 goals), 1996 (23)
- Uzbekistan Player of the Year: 1995
- Asian Player of the Month: September 1997
