= 1996 Uzbek League =

Football tournament

Uzbek League
- Season: 1996
- Champions: Navbahor Namangan

The 1996 Uzbek League season was the fifth edition of top-level football in Uzbekistan since independence from the Soviet Union in 1992.

== Overview ==
It was contested by 16 teams, and Navbahor Namangan won the championship.

== League standings ==
Pos	Team	Pld	W	D	L	GF	GA	GD	Pts
1	Navbahor Namangan	30	23	5	2	88	23	+65	74
2	Neftchi Farg'ona	30	23	3	4	72	30	+42	72
3	MHSK Tashkent	30	18	8	4	80	41	+39	62
4	Do'stlik	30	17	4	9	52	38	+14	55
5	Nurafshon Buxoro	30	15	5	10	52	39	+13	50
6	Pakhtakor Tashkent	30	15	3	12	50	30	+20	48
7	Traktor Tashkent	30	12	7	11	46	43	+3	43
8	Navro'z Andijan	30	11	8	11	44	51	−7	41
9	Atlaschi Marg'ilon	30	11	3	16	48	62	−14	36
10	Dinamo Samarqand	30	11	1	18	36	46	−10	34
11	Yangiyer	30	10	3	17	43	55	−12	33
12	Sogdiana Jizzakh	30	9	5	16	42	58	−16	32
13	Kosonsoy	30	9	3	18	32	61	−29	30
14	Mash'al Mubarek	30	8	4	18	28	64	−36	28
15	Dinamo Urganch	30	8	3	19	36	67	−31	27
16	Termez	30	4	7	19	29	70	−41	19
