= Oleksandr Pyshchur =

Oleksandr Pyshchur may refer to:

- Oleksandr Pyshchur (footballer, born 1981), Ukrainian footballer
- Oleksandr Pyshchur (footballer, born 2005), Ukrainian footballer, son of the above
