= 2004 Uzbek League =

Uzbek League
- Season: 2004
- Champions: Pakhtakor Tashkent
- Champions League: Pakhtakor; Neftchi Farg'ona
- Top goalscorer: Shuhrat Mirkholdirshoev; 31 goals

The 2004 Uzbek League season was the 13th edition of top-level football in Uzbekistan since independence from the Soviet Union in 1992. Pakhtakor were the defending champions from the 2003 campaign.

== Overview ==
The season began on 4 March 2004 and concluded on 20 November 2004. The League reduced from 16 to 14 teams because Kokand 1912 and Dustlik were excluded from 2004 season for being unable to pay their debts to the UFF from the previous season (2003). Pakhtakor Tashkent won the championship.

== League table ==
Pos	Team	Pld	W	D	L	GF	GA	GD	Pts	Qualification or relegation
1	Pakhtakor Tashkent	26	22	3	1	81	15	+66	69	2005 AFC Champions League
2	Neftchi Farg'ona	26	21	2	3	61	26	+35	65	2005 AFC Champions League
3	Navbahor Namangan	26	18	3	5	66	23	+43	57	
4	Nasaf Qarshi	26	17	3	6	66	31	+35	54	
5	Traktor Tashkent	26	13	2	11	46	50	−4	41	
6	Lokomotiv Tashkent	26	10	6	10	37	35	+2	36	
7	Bukhoro	26	10	3	13	31	45	−14	30 (Note: Surkhon and Bukhoro have 3 points deducted for non-payment of participation fees.)	
8	Sogdiana Jizzakh	26	9	2	15	27	47	−20	29	
9	Metallurg Bekabad	26	8	3	15	26	48	−22	27	
10	Mash'al Mubarek	26	8	3	15	34	43	−9	27	
11	Qizilqum Zarafshon	26	6	7	13	28	48	−20	25	
12	Surkhon Termez	26	7	2	17	24	55	−31	20	
13	Dinamo Samarqand	26	6	2	18	25	48	−23	20	Relegation to First League
14	Andijan	26	6	1	19	30	68	−38	19	Relegation to First League

Updated to match(es) played on 20 November 2004. Source:

== Season statistics ==
=== Top goalscorers ===
Rank	Player	Club	Goals
1	(Uzbekistan) Shuhrat Mirkholdirshoev	Navbahor	31
2	(Uzbekistan) Zafar Kholmurodov	Nasaf	29
3	(Uzbekistan) Umid Isoqov	Neftchi	17
4	(Uzbekistan) Ilhom Mo'minjonov	Traktor	14
5	(Uzbekistan) Nosirbek Otakuziev	Neftchi	13
6	(Uzbekistan) Leonid Koshelev	Pakhtakor	12
6	(Uzbekistan) Ilya Kovalenko	Neftchi	12
8	(Uzbekistan) Server Djeparov	Pakhtakor	11
8	(Uzbekistan) Zayniddin Tadjiyev	Pakhtakor	11
8	(Uzbekistan) Rasul Khayitov	Sogdiana	11
11	(Uzbekistan) Viktor Klishin	Navbahor	10
12	(Uzbekistan) Anvar Soliev	Pakhtakor	9
