= 1997 Uzbek League =

Uzbek League
- Season: 1997
- Champions: MHSK Tashkent

The 1997 Uzbek League season was the sixth edition of top level football in Uzbekistan since independence from the Soviet Union in 1992.

== Overview ==
It was contested by 18 teams, and MHSK Tashkent won the championship.

== League standings ==
Pos	Team	Pld	W	D	L	GF	GA	GD	Pts
1	MHSK Tashkent	34	29	3	2	109	42	+67	90
2	Neftchi Farg'ona	34	26	3	5	105	42	+63	81
3	Navbahor Namangan	34	21	5	8	84	37	+47	68
4	Do'stlik	34	19	5	10	87	56	+31	62
5	Pakhtakor Tashkent	34	18	7	9	65	36	+29	61
6	Nasaf Qarshi	34	15	8	11	68	57	+11	53
7	Buxoro	34	16	5	13	57	55	+2	53
8	Sogdiana Jizzakh	34	15	7	12	51	46	+5	52
9	Zarafshon Navoi	34	13	5	16	56	61	−5	44
10	Xorazm Urganch	35	13	3	19	58	77	−19	42
11	Surkhon Termez	34	11	7	16	39	60	−21	40
12	Andijan	34	11	6	17	54	62	−8	39
13	Traktor Tashkent	34	10	8	16	52	65	−13	38
14	Kosonsoy	34	11	3	20	40	72	−32	36
15	Afrosiab Samarqand	34	8	8	18	35	73	−38	32
16	Chilanzar Tashkent	34	8	6	20	51	70	−19	30
17	Yangiyer	34	7	7	20	47	72	−25	28
18	Atlaschi Marg'ilon	33	6	2	25	37	112	−75	20

== Top scorer ==
- Jafar Irismetov, Do'stlik - 23 goals.
