= Bakhtiyor Hamidullaev =

Uzbekistani footballer

Personal information
- Full name: Bakhtiyor Hamidullaev
- Date of birth: 7 March 1978 (age 48)
- Place of birth: Andijan, Uzbekistan
- Position: Forward

Team information
- Current team: Andijan (manager)

Senior career*
Years	Team	Apps	(Gls)
1997–2002	FK Andijan	96	(80)
2003	Pakhtakor Toshkent	5	(2)
2003–2004	FK Andijan	33	(14)
2005	Neftchi Farg'ona	9	(0)
2006–2008	FK Andijan		
2009	Olmaliq FK		
2010–2011	FK Andijan	47	(6)

International career^{‡}
2001	Uzbekistan	8	(3)

Managerial career
- 2018–2019: Andijan (youth)
- 2020–: Andijan
- * Club domestic league appearances and goals as of 9 November 2013 ‡ National team caps and goals as of 20 October 2001

Bakhtiyor Hamidullaev (born 7 March 1978 in Andijan, USSR (now Uzbekistan) is a former Uzbek football and player. He is currently the manager of Andijan.

== Career ==
He played the most time of his career for FK Andijan and is considered as one of the best players of FK Andijan history in modern period. Hamidullaev was Best club top scorer in 1999–2002 and 2006 seasons and also became Uzbek League Top Scorer in 1999 with 24 goals and in 2002 with 22 goals. He scored over 190 goals in Uzbek League, Cup and for national team and member of Gennadi Krasnitsky club of Uzbek top scorers. He finished player career in 2011 and played last season for FK Andijan

== International ==
Bakhtiyor Hamidullaev achieved 8 caps as Uzbekistan national football team player, scoring 3 goals. The most notable of his international appearances was 2001 Merdeka Tournament in Kuala Lumpur, Malaysia where Uzbekistan team won the tournament for the first time. Hamidullaev scored 3 goals in 3 matches. His golden goal in overtime of final match against Bosnia and Herzegovina helped Uzbekistan team win match with 2:1.

== Honours ==
=== National team ===
- Merdeka Tournament: 2001

=== Individual ===
- Uzbek League Top Scorer (2): 1999, 2002
- Gennadi Krasnitsky club: 191 goals

== Career statistics ==
=== International ===
Goals for Senior National Team

#	Date	Venue	Opponent	Score	Result	Competition
1.	22 June 2001	Kuala Lumpur, Thailand	Thailand	1–0	1–0	2001 Merdeka Tournament
2.	26 June 2001	Kuala Lumpur, Thailand	India	1–0	2–1	2001 Merdeka Tournament
3.	30 June 2001	Kuala Lumpur, Thailand	Bosnia and Herzegovina	2–1	2–1	2001 Merdeka Tournament
Correct as of 20 October 2001
