= 1998 Uzbek League =

Uzbek League
- Season: 1998
- Champions: Pakhtakor Tashkent

The 1998 Uzbek League season was the seventh edition of top-level football in Uzbekistan since independence from the Soviet Union in 1992.

== Overview ==
It was contested by 16 teams, and Pakhtakor Tashkent won the championship.

== League standings ==
Pos	Team	Pld	W	D	L	GF	GA	GD	Pts
1	Pakhtakor Tashkent	30	24	4	2	96	29	+67	76
2	Neftchi Farg'ona	30	21	7	2	82	27	+55	70
3	Navbahor Namangan	30	18	5	7	60	33	+27	59
4	Sogdiana Jizzakh	30	16	4	10	56	43	+13	52
5	Nasaf Qarshi	30	12	9	9	43	31	+12	45
6	Buxoro	30	13	4	13	51	50	+1	43
7	Temiryo'lchi Qo'qon	30	13	4	13	53	63	−10	43
8	Do'stlik	30	11	10	9	57	43	+14	43
9	Andijan	30	12	4	14	59	58	+1	40
10	Surkhon Termez	30	12	4	14	50	62	−12	40
11	Zarafshon Navoi	30	12	4	14	46	58	−12	40
12	Xorazm Urganch	30	10	6	14	39	55	−16	36
13	Metallurg Bekabad	30	9	7	14	37	50	−13	34
14	Traktor Tashkent	30	9	7	14	38	52	−14	34
15	MHSK Tashkent	30	2	5	23	28	97	−69	11
16	Kosonsoy	30	2	4	24	31	75	−44	10

== Match results ==
	1	2	3	4	5	6	7	8	9	10	11	12	13	14	15	16
1. Pakhtakor Tashkent		1:0	2:0	6:1	3:1	4:2	5:2	2:1	7:1	5:1	8:0	6:1	2:2	5:1	3:0	4:1
2. Neftchi Farg'ona	1:1		3:1	2:0	1:1	4:2	4:0	4:0	4:0	3:2	3:1	7:1	4:1	2:0	5:1	7:2
3. Navbahor Namangan	1:0	2:2		2:0	0:0	4:2	2:1	2:2	5:0	3:0	1:0	3:1	1:0	2:0	6:1	3:0
4. Sogdiana Jizzakh	1:1	1:1	3:1		2:1	5:2	3:0	4:2	1:2	1:0	3:1	4:0	3:0	1:0	4:2	2:1
5. Nasaf Qarshi	2:1	0:1	0:1	0:0		4:1	0:0	0:0	1:0	4:1	2:0	4:0	5:0	2:0	3:0	3:1
6. Temiryo'lchi Qo'qon	2:3	2:3	1:1	4:2	1:0		3:1	1:0	3:2	0:6	2:0	3:1	2:0	1:1	2:0	2:1
7. Buxoro	1:2	2:0	3:1	0:1	2:1	1:0		3:1	0:0	6:1	1:2	4:2	2:0	2:1	2:2	4:1
8. Do'stlik	1:3	2:2	1:1	2:0	0:0	6:1	5:1		5:0	6:4	5:1	0:0	0:0	2:1	4:1	4:2
9. Surkhon Termez	3:5	0:3	3:1	1:0	1:1	0:2	3:1	2:1		3:1	4:2	1:2	2:0	4:0	5:0	4:0
10. Andijan	0:1	0:2	1:2	2:1	6:0	3:2	2:0	2:2	6:2		5:0	2:1	1:1	2:1	3:0	0:0
11. Zarafshon Navoi	0:1	1:1	1:4	4:2	0:0	2:3	4:1	3:1	2:2	3:0		3:2	2:0	3:0	4:2	3:1
12. Xorazm Urganch	0:0	1:3	1:0	1:1	2:2	1:0	2:1	0:1	0:0	2:0	2:0		0:1	2:0	4:1	3:0
13. Traktor Tashkent	1:3	0:3	2:3	1:2	4:2	3:0	0:2	1:0	2:1	1:1	1:1	2:1		2:2	6:1	1:0
14. Metallurg Bekabad	0:3	1:4	2:0	3:1	1:0	1:1	0:0	0:1	3:0	4:2	1:0	2:2	3:3		3:1	3:1
15.MHSK Tashkent	1:7	0:0	1:5	0:4	2:3	2:4	2:6	0:0	2:1	0:1	0:2	1:4	0:2	1:1		3:2
16. Kosonsoy	1:2	1:3	0:2	1:3	0:1	2:2	0:2	2:2	2:3	2:4	0:1	3:0	3:1	0:2	1:1	

== Top scorer(s) ==
#	Footballer	Club	Goals
1	(Uzbekistan) Igor Shkvyrin	Pakhtakor Tashkent FK	22
1	(Uzbekistan) Mirjalol Qosimov	Pakhtakor Tashkent FK	22
3	(Uzbekistan) Sergey Lebedev	FC Neftchi Fergana	18
3	(Uzbekistan) Aleksey Jdanov	FC Sogdiana Jizzakh	18
