= 2009 Uzbek League =

Uzbek League
- Season: 2009
- Champions: Bunyodkor
- Relegated: Sogdiana; FK Buxoro
- 2010 AFC Champions League: Bunyodkor; Pakhtakor
- 2010 AFC Cup: Nasaf Qarshi
- Top goalscorer: Rivaldo 20 goals

The 2009 Uzbek League season was the 18th edition of top level football in Uzbekistan since independence in 1992

Bunyodkor were the defending champions from the 2008 campaign.

Pakhtakor hold the most titles with 8 Uzbek League crowns to their name.

== Clubs and locations ==
Location of teams in 2009 Uzbek League

| Club | Coach | City | Stadium |
|---|---|---|---|
| FK Andijan | (Uzbekistan) Orif Mamatkazin | Andijan | Navro'z Stadium |
| FK Buxoro | (Uzbekistan) Rauf Inileev | Bukhoro | Markaziy Stadium |
| Bunyodkor | (Brazil) Luiz Felipe Scolari | Tashkent | JAR Stadium |
| Lokomotiv Tashkent | (Uzbekistan) Vadim Abramov | Tashkent | Lokomotiv Stadium |
| Mash'al Mubarek | (Uzbekistan) Bahodir Davlatov | Muborak | Bahrom Vafoev Stadium |
| Metallurg Bekabad | (Uzbekistan) Rustam Mirsodiqov | Bekabad | Metallurg Bekabad Stadium |
| Nasaf Qarshi | (Russia) Viktor Kumykov | Qarshi | Markaziy Stadium |
| Navbahor Namangan | (Uzbekistan) Mustafo Bayramov | Namangan | Markaziy Stadium |
| Neftchi Farg'ona | (Uzbekistan) Yuriy Sarkisyan | Fergana | Fargona Stadium |
| Olmaliq FK | (Uzbekistan) Igor Shkvyrin | Olmaliq | Metallurg Stadium |
| Pakhtakor | (Uzbekistan) Viktor Djalilov | Tashkent | Pakhtakor Markaziy Stadium |
| FK Samarqand-Dinamo | (Uzbekistan) Azamat Abduraimov | Samarkand | Dynamo Samarkand Stadium |
| Sogdiana Jizzakh | (Russia) Oleg Tyulkin | Jizzakh | Markaziy Stadium |
| Qizilqum Zarafshon | (Uzbekistan) Rustam Zabirov | Zarafshan | Progress Stadium |
| Shurtan Guzar | (Ukraine) Victor Pasulko | G'uzor | G'uzor Stadium |
| Xorazm FK Urganch | (Uzbekistan) Vali Sultonov | Urganch | Xorazm Stadium |

- O.T.M.K. Olmaliq changed name to Olmaliq FK
- FK Dustlik Jizzakh withdrew because of financial problems and were replaced by FK Buxoro

== Managerial changes ==
| Team | Outgoing manager | Manner of departure | Replaced by |
|---|---|---|---|
| Bunyodkor | (Brazil) Zico | Resigned | (Turkey) Amet Memet |
| Bunyodkor | (Turkey) Amet Memet | Resigned after 2 games | (Uzbekistan) Khikmat Irgashev |
| Bunyodkor | (Uzbekistan) Khikmat Irgashev | Replaced after 10 games | (Brazil) Luiz Felipe Scolari |

== League table ==
| Pos | Team | Pld | W | D | L | GF | GA | GD | Pts | Qualification or relegation |
|---|---|---|---|---|---|---|---|---|---|---|
| 1 | Bunyodkor | 30 | 28 | 2 | 0 | 85 | 13 | +72 | 86 | 2010 AFC Champions League Group stage |
| 2 | Pakhtakor Tashkent | 30 | 18 | 10 | 2 | 69 | 16 | +53 | 64 | 2010 AFC Champions League Group stage |
| 3 | Nasaf Qarshi | 30 | 16 | 7 | 7 | 48 | 27 | +21 | 55 | |
| 4 | Olmaliq FK | 30 | 15 | 3 | 12 | 50 | 38 | +12 | 48 | |
| 5 | Neftchi Farg'ona | 30 | 14 | 4 | 12 | 43 | 38 | +5 | 46 | |
| 6 | Lokomotiv Tashkent | 30 | 11 | 9 | 10 | 34 | 40 | −6 | 42 | |
| 7 | FK Andijan | 30 | 10 | 9 | 11 | 47 | 48 | −1 | 39 | |
| 8 | FC Shurtan Guzar | 30 | 11 | 6 | 13 | 36 | 50 | −14 | 39 | |
| 9 | FK Samarqand-Dinamo | 30 | 11 | 5 | 14 | 44 | 42 | +2 | 38 | |
| 10 | Xorazm FK Urganch | 30 | 9 | 11 | 10 | 30 | 39 | −9 | 38 | |
| 11 | Qizilqum Zarafshon | 30 | 10 | 5 | 15 | 33 | 56 | −23 | 35 | |
| 12 | Metallurg Bekabad | 30 | 7 | 10 | 13 | 36 | 49 | −13 | 31 | |
| 13 | Mash'al Mubarek | 30 | 8 | 6 | 16 | 32 | 43 | −11 | 30 | |
| 14 | Navbahor Namangan | 30 | 7 | 7 | 16 | 21 | 48 | −27 | 28 | |
| 15 | FK Buxoro (R) | 30 | 6 | 6 | 18 | 40 | 59 | −19 | 24 | Relegation to Lower Division |
| 15 | Sogdiana Jizzakh (R) | 30 | 6 | 6 | 18 | 24 | 66 | −42 | 24 | Relegation to Lower Division |

Updated to match(es) played on 15 November 2009. Source: Uzbekistan Professional Football League
Rules for classification: 1) points; 2) goal difference; 3) number of goals scored.
(R) Relegated

== Season statistics ==
=== Top goalscorers ===
| Rank | Name | Club | Goals |
|---|---|---|---|
| 1 | (Brazil) Rivaldo | Bunyodkor | 20 (4) |
| 2 | (Uzbekistan) Anvar Soliev | Bunyodkor | 18 |
| 3 | (Uzbekistan) Odil Ahmedov | Pakhtakor | 16 (1) |
| 4 | (Uzbekistan) Lochinbek Soliev | FK Buxoro | 15 (3) |
| 5 | (Uzbekistan) Alexander Geynrikh | Pakhtakor | 13 |
| 5 | (Uzbekistan) Anvar Berdiev | Neftchi Farg'ona | 13 (3) |
| 5 | (Chile) Jose Luis Villanueva | Bunyodkor | 13 |
| 8 | (Uzbekistan) Muiddin Mamazulunov | Olmaliq FK | 12 |
| 9 | (Uzbekistan) Server Djeparov | Bunyodkor | 11 |

Last updated: 17.11.2009
