= MHSK Tashkent =

MHSK
- Full name: MHSK futbol klubi
- Founded: c. 1945
- Dissolved: 2001; 24 years ago
- Ground: MHSK Stadium
- Capacity: 17,000
- League: Uzbekistan First League
- 1999: 6th

MHSK (Uzbek: Марказий Ҳарбий спорт клуби, romanized: Markaziy Harbiy Sport Klubi) was an Uzbekistani football club based in Tashkent. Its abbreviation meant Army Central Sports Club, similar to the Soviet equivalent CSKA.

== History ==
The year of establishment is unknown, yet the club participated in Soviet competitions since 1946. Until 1988 it played as part of the Soviet Armed Forces sports club which often changed its name. Since 1955 it was named as SKA Tashkent. In 1989 it was transformed into a junior squad as Regional School of Higher Sports Mastery, SKA-RShVSM Tashkent. With the fall of the Soviet Union in 1992, the club became a farm club of FC Pakhtakor Tashkent as Pakhtakor-79 Tashkent. Since 1993 and until 2001 the club played as MHSK Tashkent.

MHSK Tashkent played 7 seasons in the Uzbek League: 1992–1998. In that time club won championship in 1997 and runner-up in 1995 Uzbek Cup. One year later in 1998 season, club finished 16th and relegated to the lower division. In 1999–2000 club played in Uzbekistan First League. Before the start of 2001 season in First League, MHSK officially withdrew from competition.

=== Name changes history ===
- until 1992: Umid
- 1992: Pakhtakor-79
- 1993: Binokor
- 1993—2001: MHSK

== Honours ==
- Uzbek League champion: 1
  - 1997
- Uzbek Cup runner-up: 1
  - 1995

== Managerial history ==
| Name | Nat | Period |
|---|---|---|
| Bahrom Khakimov | (Uzbekistan) | 1994– |
| Rustam Mirsodiqov | (Uzbekistan) | 1997 |
