= PFC Navbahor Namangan =

Association football club in Uzbekistan

Navbahor Namangan
- Full name: PFC. Navbahor Namangan
- Founded: 1978; 48 years ago
- Ground: Markaziy Stadium; Namangan
- Capacity: 22,000
- Manager: Timur Kapadze
- League: Uzbekistan Super League
- 2025: Uzbekistan Super League, 7th of 16
- Website: pfcnavbahor.uz
Home colours	Away colours

PFC. Navbahor Namangan (Uzbek: Navbahor Namangan Futbol Klubi) is an Uzbek professional football club based in Namangan. The club's name means New Spring. They play in the Uzbekistan Super League.

== Name ==
RAHIMOV origins from Persian word Now-Bahaar (New-Spring).

== History ==
Navbahor Namangan was founded 1978 under the name Tekstilshchik and played in first league of Uzbekistan. Since 1978 club participated in one of regional zones of Soviet Second League. In 1990 season Navbahor finished runner-up in Soviet Second League, East conference and promoted to Soviet First League. 1991 Soviet First League season Navbahor Namangan finished at 9th place.

Since 1992 Navbahor plays in Uzbek League. The club is one of three clubs among Pakhtakor, Neftchi Farg'ona continuously participating in all seasons of Uzbek League. In 1996 Navbahor Namangan became champion of Uzbekistan, finishing league from 1993 to 1995 three times in a row at 3rd position. Navbahor is also winner of the Uzbekistan Supercup in 1999, a match between champion and Uzbek Cup winner.

2004 season Navbahor finished 3rd, the recent best achievement of club. The club was unsuccessful in 2008–13 years. In 2009 season club ranked 14th in the League, close to relegation to First League and it is actually the lowest ranking of the club in its history.

In January 2014 Bakhtiyor Ashurmatov was appointed as new head coach of the club.

=== AFC Champions League debut ===
Navbahor finished the 2022 Uzbekistan Super League as runners-up which see them qualified to the 2023–24 AFC Champions League qualifying play-offs facing Al-Wakrah of Qatar. The game was levelled a 0–0 at full time thus seeing the game continue in extra time which in the 90' minute, Abdumannopov scored the goal which would see Navbahor qualified to their first ever AFC Champions League group stage appearance. On 18 September 2023, the club recorded their first ever point in a 1–1 draw against fourth time AFC Champions League winners, Al-Hilal at the King Fahd International Stadium. On 2 October 2023, Navbahor recorded their first ever win in a 3–0 home win against Mumbai City of India. The club finished the group stage with 13 points with 3 points behind group leaders, Al-Hilal thus seeing them qualified to the Round of 16 in their debut season.

2023–24 AFC Champions League

== Name change history ==
- 1978–80: Tekstilshchik
- 1980–83: Navbahor
- 1983–87: Avtomobilist
- 1988–: PFC. Navbahor

== Players ==
As of 29 July, 2026

Note: Flags indicate national team as defined under FIFA eligibility rules; some limited exceptions apply. Players may hold more than one non-FIFA nationality.

No.	Pos.	Nation	Player
1	GK	UZB	Utkir Yusupov (captain)
2	DF	UZB	Saidazamat Mirsaidov
3	DF	UZB	Zafarbek Rakhimjonov
4	DF	UZB	Islombek Mamatkazin
5	DF	UZB	Dilshod Komilov
6	MF	UZB	Shokhrukh Abdurakhmonov
7	MF	UZB	Ruslanbek Jiyanov
8	MF	UZB	Diyor Kholmatov
10	MF	UZB	Shokhmalik Komilov
11	FW	UZB	Khusayin Norchaev
13	MF	NGR	Benjamin Teidi
16	GK	UZB	Shukron Yuldashev
17	FW	UZB	Mukhammadali Giyosov

No.	Pos.	Nation	Player
20	MF	UZB	Kuvondik Ruziev
21	DF	UZB	Asadbek Rakhimjonov
22	DF	UZB	Umar Adkhamzoda
23	FW	SRB	Vanja Ilić
28	FW	KGZ	Joel Kojo
30	MF	UZB	Jasurbek Jaloliddinov
34	DF	GEO	Giorgi Jgerenaia
35	GK	UZB	Valizhon Rakhimov
44	DF	GEO	Anri Chichinadze
70	MF	UZB	Abbos Gulomov
77	FW	UZB	Mukhammadali Usmonov
97	FW	BRA	Alex Fernandes
-	MF	UZB	Abdulla Abdullaev

== Seasons ==
=== Domestic ===
Season	League									Uzbekistan Cup	Top goalscorer	
Season	Div.	Pos.	Pl.	W	D	L	GS	GA	P	Uzbekistan Cup	Name	League
1992	1st	5th	32	18	8	6	54	21	44	Winner	Rustam Zabirov	15
1993	1st	3rd	30	18	7	5	64	32	43	Runner Up	Farid Khabibullin	13
1994	1st	3rd	30	17	6	7	58	26	40	Semifinal		
1995	1st	3rd	30	23	3	4	69	23	72	Winner		
1996	1st	1st	30	23	5	2	88	23	74	Quarterfinal	Oleg Shatskikh	23
1997	1st	3rd	34	21	5	8	84	37	68	Semifinal		
1998	1st	3rd	30	18	5	7	60	33	59	Winner		
1999	1st	3rd	30	18	7	5	55	34	61	N/A		
2000	1st	5th	38	19	8	11	92	56	65	Quarterfinal		
2001	1st	4th	34	20	1	13	79	52	61	Last 16	Shuhrat Mirkholdirshoev	23
2002	1st	6th	30	14	4	12	53	39	46	Last 32		
2003	1st	3rd	30	19	6	5	66	28	63	Semifinal	Shuhrat Mirkholdirshoev	26
2004	1st	3rd	26	218	3	5	66	23	57	Last 32	Shuhrat Mirkholdirshoev	31
2005	1st	6th	26	12	3	11	31	31	39	Semifinal	Shuhrat Mirkholdirshoev	20
2006	1st	7th	30	13	5	12	46	35	44	Last 16	Arif Mirzoýew	18
2007	1st	8th	30	11	4	15	37	41	37	Last 16	Vladimir Baranov	12
2008	1st	13th	30	7	11	12	28	39	32	Last 16	Shuhrat Mirkholdirshoev	13
2009	1st	14th	30	7	7	16	21	48	28	Last 16		
2010	1st	9th	26	9	4	13	32	32	31	Last 16	Shuhrat Mirkholdirshoev	11
2011	1st	6th	26	9	9	8	26	21	36	Last 16	Ruzimboy Ahmedov	5
2012	1st	12th	26	6	8	12	19	34	26	Last 16	Sobir Khamidov	5
2013	1st	11th	26	7	6	13	29	48	27	Last 16	Ruzimboy Ahmedov	11
2014	1st	7th	26	9	3	14	38	40	30	Quarterfinal	Shakhboz Erkinov	14
2015	1st	8th	30	11	4	15	40	51	37	Last 16	Shakhboz Erkinov	13
2016	1st	15th	30	6	5	19	37	66	23	Last 16	Akrom Bakhriddinov; Dilshod Jabborov	7
2017	1st	5th	30	12	10	8	40	37	46	Last 16	Azizbek Turgunboev	8
2018	1st	3rd	20	9	4	7	20	18	31	Last 32	Azizbek Turgunboev	7
2019	1st	8th	26	7	11	8	26	23	32	Quartfinal	Azamat Alaniyazov	4
2020	1st	8th	26	8	11	7	24	21	35	Quartfinal	Azizbek Turgunboev	8
2021	1st	6th	26	10	9	7	23	19	39	Round of 16	Azimjon Akhmedov	3
2022	1st	2nd	26	15	8	3	33	15	53	Runner Up	Zoran Marušić	11

=== Continental history ===
As of match played 6 November 2023

Competition	Pld	W	D	L	GF	GA
Asian Club Championship	7	2	2	3	14	9
Asian Cup Winners' Cup	10	4	1	5	18	23
AFC Champions League	6	4	1	1	10	5
Total	23	10	4	9	42	37

Season	Competition	Round	Club	Home	Away	Aggregate
1996–97	Asian Cup Winners' Cup	First round	(Iraq) Al-Quwa Al-Jawiya	1–4	5–2	6–6
1996–97	Asian Cup Winners' Cup	Second round	(Iran) Esteghlal	1–4	3–0	4–4
1997–98	Asian Club Championship	First round	-	Bye		
1997–98	Asian Club Championship	Intermediate Round	(Tajikistan) Dynamo Dushanbe	3–0	1–2	4–2
1997–98	Asian Club Championship	Second round	(Turkmenistan) Nisa Aşgabat	6–1	2–2	8–3
1997–98	Asian Club Championship	Quarterfinal - West Asia	(Lebanon) Al Ansar	0–0		3rd
1997–98	Asian Club Championship	Quarterfinal - West Asia	(Saudi Arabia) Al Hilal	1–3		3rd
1997–98	Asian Club Championship	Quarterfinal - West Asia	(Iran) Persepolis	1–1		3rd
1999–2000	Asian Cup Winners' Cup	First round	-	Bye		
1999–2000	Asian Cup Winners' Cup	Second round	(Kazakhstan) Kaisar-Hurricane	2–2	1–0	3–2
1999–2000	Asian Cup Winners' Cup	Quarterfinal	(Saudi Arabia) Al-Ahli	1–6	2–0	3–6
1999–2000	Asian Cup Winners' Cup	Semifinal	(Iraq) Al-Zawraa	1–2		
1999–2000	Asian Cup Winners' Cup	Third place match	(Thailand) Bangkok Bank	1–3		
2023–24	AFC Champions League	Play-off round	(Qatar) Al-Wakrah	1–0 (a.e.t.)		
2023–24	AFC Champions League	Group D	(Saudi Arabia) Al Hilal	0–2	1–1	2nd
2023–24	AFC Champions League	Group D	(India) Mumbai City	3–0	2–1	2nd
2023–24	AFC Champions League	Group D	(Iran) Nassaji Mazandaran	2–1	3–1	2nd

== Stadium ==
Clubs home ground is Markaziy Stadium with original capacity of 35,000. The stadium which was built in 1989 was one of the biggest football stadiums by capacity in the country. In 2011, the club have announced their intention to renovate the stadium and it was closed for long time reconstruction. The rehabilitation works were finished in spring 2014. The festive opening of the renovated all-seater stadium was held on 29 May 2014 with Barkamol avlod 2014 annual sporting games opening ceremony. The capacity of the new venue is 22,000.

In 2012 until 2014, the club temporary played their home matches at the Kosonsoy Stadium as their home ground is under renovation during the point of time. The first official match in renovated stadium was held on 14 June 2014 with League match Navbahor – Olmaliq FK with 3–1 victory of host team.

== Honours ==
=== Domestic ===
- Uzbek League
  - Champions (1): 1996
  - Second place (1): 2022
  - Third place (8): 1993, 1994, 1995, 1997, 1998, 1999, 2003, 2004, 2023
- Uzbek Cup
  - Winners (3): 1992, 1995, 1998
  - Runners-up (2): 2022, 2024
- Uzbekistan Super Cup
  - Winners (1): 1999

=== Continental ===
- Asian Cup Winners Cup:
  - Fourth-place (1): 1999–00

== Managerial history ==
Name	Period
(Soviet Union) Sergei Dotsenko	19??–84
(Soviet Union) Pavel Kim	1984–July 87
(Soviet Union) Petr Boldyrev	July 1988–June 89
(Soviet Union) Valeri Gladilin	July 1989–90
(Soviet Union) Igor Volchok	1990–91
(Uzbekistan) Berador Abduraimov	1992
(Uzbekistan) Boris Babaev	1993, 1st half
(Uzbekistan) Usman Asqaraliev	1993, 2nd half
(Uzbekistan) Sharif Nazarov	1994–95
(Uzbekistan) Berador Abduraimov	1995
(Russia) Igor Volchok	2003
(Turkmenistan) Rahym Kurbanmämmedow	2005
(Uzbekistan) Rustam Zabirov	2005–08
(Uzbekistan) Eldor Sakaev	2008
(Turkmenistan) Rahym Kurbanmämmedow	2009
(Uzbekistan) Viktor Djalilov	2010
(Uzbekistan) Mustafo Bayramov	2011–12
(Uzbekistan) Usmon Asqaraliev	Feb 2013– Jan 14 2014
(Uzbekistan) Bakhtiyor Ashurmatov	Jan 2014– 28 Dec 2015
(Uzbekistan) Rashid Gafurov (interim)	28 Dec 2015– 27 April 2016
(Uzbekistan) Aleksandr Volkov	27 April 2016– 22 June 2016
(Uzbekistan) Ravshan Bozorov	2 July 2016 – 6 November 2016
(Uzbekistan) Ilkhom Muminjonov	6 November 2016 – 9 October 2018
(Russia) Andrei Kanchelskis	9 October 2018 – 20 June 2019
(Serbia) Dejan Đurđević	24 June 2019 – September 2019
(Russia) Andrei Kanchelskis	September 2019 – October 2020
(Uzbekistan) Numon Khasanov	October 2020 – March 2021
(Uzbekistan) Viktor Djalilov	March 2021 – January 2022
(Uzbekistan) Samvel Babayan (football coach)	January 2022 – present
