= 2000 Uzbek League =

Uzbek League
- Season: 2000
- Champions: Do'stlik
- Relegated: Guliston; Xorazm; Qo'qon
- Goals: 1,279 (3.37 per match)
- Top goalscorer: Jafar Irismetov (45 goals)
- Biggest home win: Samarqand 8–0 Semurg A.
- Biggest away win: Sogdiana 1–8 Do'stlik
- Highest scoring: Samarqand 6–3 Do'stlik; Sogdiana 1–8 Do'stlik; Sogdiana 3–6 Samarqand; Navbahor 6–3 Sogdiana; Semurg A. 4–5 Nasaf

The 2000 Uzbek League season was the ninth edition of top level football in Uzbekistan since independence from the Soviet Union in 1992.

== Overview ==
It was contested by 20 teams, and Do'stlik won the championship. Top scorer was Jafar Irismetov of Do'stlik with 45 goals, the most scored by one player in a single season.

== League standings ==
Pos	Team	Pld	W	D	L	GF	GA	GD	Pts
1	Do'stlik	38	30	4	4	108	44	+64	94
2	Neftchi Farg'ona	38	28	6	4	96	32	+64	90
3	Nasaf Qarshi	38	26	7	5	92	52	+40	85
4	Dinamo Samarqand	38	24	3	11	92	47	+45	75
5	Navbahor Namangan	38	19	8	11	92	56	+36	65
6	Buxoro	38	20	5	13	73	60	+13	65
7	Pakhtakor Tashkent	38	17	9	12	67	51	+16	60
8	Andijan	38	15	10	13	82	62	+20	55
9	Surkhon Termez	38	15	7	16	69	79	−10	52
10	Traktor Tashkent	38	15	6	17	54	52	+2	51
11	Qizilqum Zarafshon	38	13	12	13	46	55	−9	51
12	Semurg Angren	38	13	8	17	63	75	−12	47
13	Metalourg Bekabad	38	12	8	18	44	58	−14	44
14	Kimyogar Chirchiq	38	11	9	18	47	65	−18	42
15	Turon Nukus	38	10	7	21	41	82	−41	37
16	Zarafshon Navoi	38	8	10	20	37	72	−35	34
17	Sogdiana Jizzakh	38	9	5	24	46	96	−50	32
18	Guliston	38	8	7	23	39	70	−31	31
19	Xorazm Urganch	38	8	6	24	38	67	−29	30
20	Temiryo'lchi Qo'qon	38	8	5	25	53	104	−51	29

== Top scorer ==
- Jafar Irismetov, Do'stlik - 45 goals.
