= Uzbekistan Super League =

Association football league in Uzbekistan

Uzbekistan Super League Ўзбекистон Суперлигаси
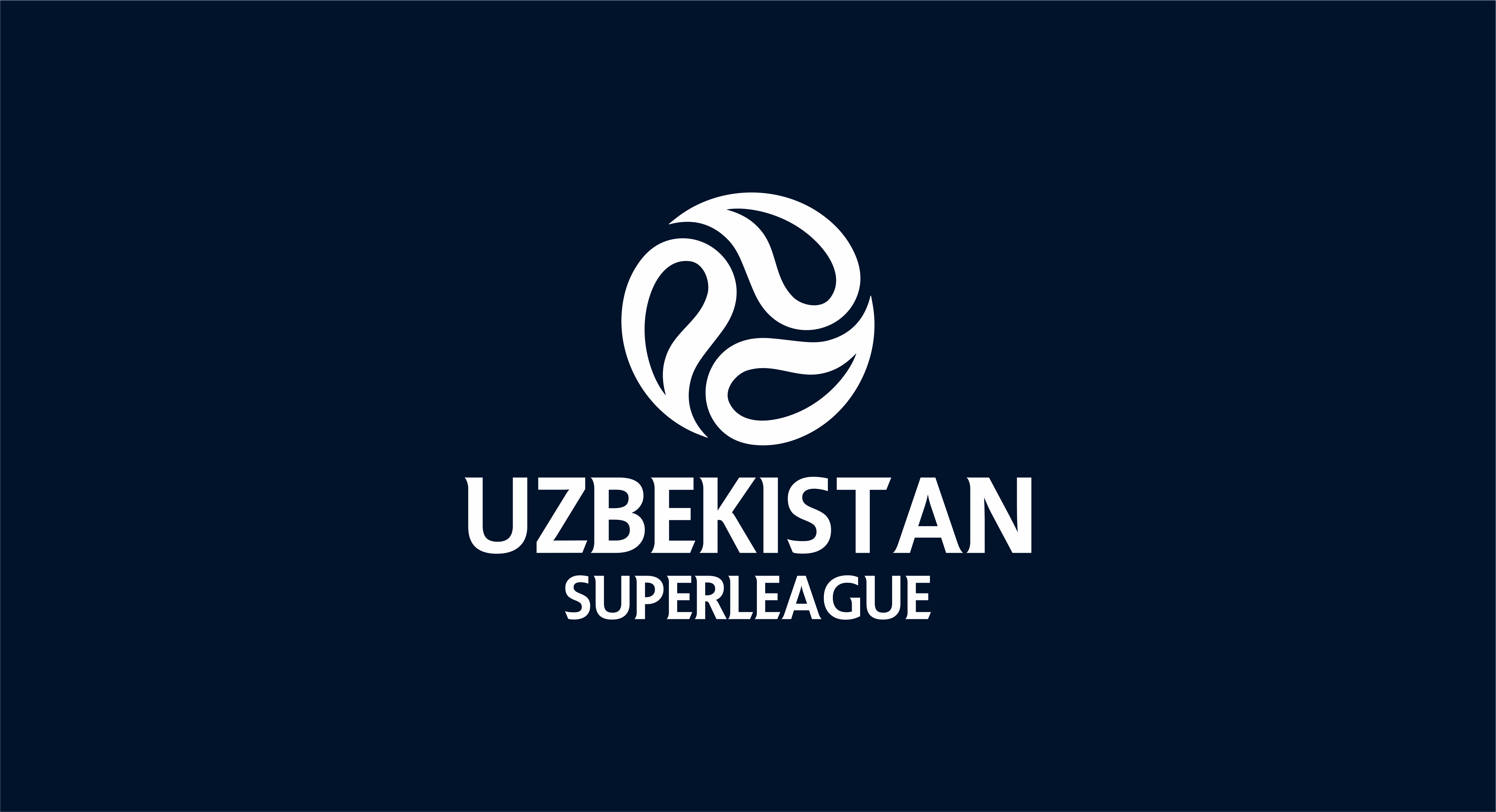
- Organising body: Uzbekistan Professional Football League
- Founded: 1992; 34 years ago
- Country: Uzbekistan
- Confederation: AFC
- Number of clubs: 16
- Level on pyramid: 1
- Relegation to: Uzbekistan Pro League
- Domestic cup(s): Uzbekistan Cup; Uzbekistan Super Cup
- League cup: Uzbekistan League Cup
- International cup(s): AFC Champions League Elite; AFC Champions League Two
- Current champions: Neftchi (6th title) (2025)
- Most championships: Pakhtakor (16 titles)
- Broadcasters: Sport TV (Uzbekistan); Futbol TV (Uzbekistan)
- Sponsor: Artel Electronics
- Website: pfl.uz; t.me/uzpfl
- Current: 2026 Uzbekistan Super League

Uzbekistan Super League (Uzbek: Ўзбекистон Суперлигаси) is the top division of professional football in Uzbekistan. It is operated under the auspices of the Uzbekistan Professional Football League. It was founded in 1992 and currently has 16 teams. The top team qualifies to the group stage of the AFC Champions League.

== History ==
The Uzbek League was founded in 1992. In 2018, it was renamed to the Uzbekistan Super League.

On 21 November 2017 according to a UzPFL management decision the Uzbek League was officially renamed to Uzbekistan Super League, starting from the 2018 season. The number of teams playing in the top division is 16. Well-known players including Rivaldo, Eren Derdiyok, Zico, and Luiz Felipe Scolari have all played in the league.

The U19 and U21 Championship was established in 2020. Starting in 2021, it will be held between clubs from Uzbekistan Super League and Pro League footballers under 19 and 21 years old.

== League system ==
The league is generally played between March and November in the calendar year and has occasionally had the Super Cup as a curtain raiser to the domestic campaign. Teams play each other on a home and away basis. Two or three teams can be relegated depending on the number of sides participating which has in the past been between fourteen and seventeen sides. Occasionally no sides would be promoted from the First League, due to reserve teams winning the championships. Reserve clubs are not allowed to feature in the top flight but can play at any level up to First League. On these occasions, clubs can be relegated without any promoted sides making the next campaign feature less sides than before. League winners enter the next edition of the AFC Champions League along with the winners of the Uzbekistan Cup.

The final match of the U19 and U21 Championship will also be held the day after the first team match in the Super League.

== AFC ranking ==
As of June 2025, Uzbekistan Super League is ranked ninth in Asian Football Confederation (AFC) national league table (an analogue of the UEFA coefficient table). A ninth-place ranking for the Uzbekistan Championship gives one participant from the Uzbekistan Super League one guaranteed place in the AFC Champions League Elite group stage and one additional place in the AFC Champions League qualifying play-off round.

For 2025.

Rank	Country	Points
1	Saudi Arabia	119.957
2	Japan	107.663
3	South Korea	90.982
4	Qatar	74.466
5	Iran	72.018
6	United Arab Emirates	64.129
7	Thailand	54.873
8	China	54.682
9	Uzbekistan	49.821
10	Australia	40.420
11	Malaysia	40.039
12	Iraq	39.280
13	Jordan	39.205
14	Vietnam	35.038
15	Singapore	29.405
16	Bahrain	27.333
17	Oman	26.069
18	(India) Indian Super League	24.958
19	Hong Kong Premier League	24.436
20	Turkmenistan Higher League	24.211

== Clubs ==
The most decorated team among Uzbek clubs is Pakhtakor Tashkent. Pakhtakor has currently won the tournament 16 times. The winners of Uzbekistan Super League participate in the Asian Champions League. Specifically, the Uzbekistan champion and the winner of the Uzbekistan Cup directly qualify for Asian Champions League group stage, while the silver and bronze medalists of the Super League advance to the Champions League through qualifying matches. Currently, the best result for Super League teams in the continental Champions League is reaching the semi-finals. In some years, Uzbek clubs have also participated in the AFC Cup, the second most prestigious tournament in Asia. Nasaf, for example, won the 2011 AFC Cup final.

== Foreign Players limit in the Super League ==
To participate, a club can register up to five foreign players. One (or all) of these players must be citizens of an Asian Football Confederation (AFC) member country, meaning Uzbekistan has a four-player limit. If a foreign player from an AFC member country is unavailable, the club cannot include more than four foreign players in its roster (players registered with a farm club also count).

== Super League player records ==
The Uzbekistan Super League has featured numerous renowned domestic and international footballers. Brazilian Rivaldo, for example, played for Bunyodkor from 2008 to 2010. In 2009, Rivaldo became the top scorer in the Uzbekistan Championship with 20 goals. Anvar Berdiev holds the record for most goals in the Super League. A longtime player for Neftchi, he scored 225 goals in the history of the Uzbekistan Championship. Asror Alikulov holds the record for most matches played. This renowned defender played a total of 520 matches.

== Season Winners ==
At the end of each season, three Super League winners are determined, along with the teams that finish in last place and are relegated to the Uzbekistan Pro League.

== Champions and top scorers ==
Key

*	League champions also won the Uzbekistan Cup, i.e. they completed the domestic Double.

As Uzbekistan Oliy Liga

Season	Champions	Runner-up	Third place	Top scorer
1992	Pakhtakor and Neftchi		Sogdiana	(Uzbekistan) Valeriy Kechinov (Pakhtakor, 24 goals)
1993	Neftchi (2)	Pakhtakor	Navbahor	(Uzbekistan) Rustam Durmonov (Neftchi, 24 goals)
1994	Neftchi (3) *	Bukhara	Navbahor (2)	(Uzbekistan) Ravshan Bozorov (Neftchi, 26 goals)
1995	Neftchi (4)	MHSK	Navbahor (3)	(Uzbekistan) Oleg Shatskikh (Navbahor, 23 goals)
1996	Navbahor	Neftchi	MHSK	(Uzbekistan) Jafar Irismetov (Dustlik, 23 goals) (Uzbekistan) Oleg Shatskikh (Navbahor, 23 goals)
1997	MHSK	Neftchi (2)	Navbahor (4)	(Uzbekistan) Jafar Irismetov (Dustlik, 34 goals)
1998	Pakhtakor (2)	Neftchi (3)	Navbahor (5)	(Uzbekistan) Mirjalol Kasymov (Pakhtakor, 22 goals) (Uzbekistan) Igor Shkvyrin (Pakhtakor, 22 goals)
1999	Dustlik	Neftchi (4)	Navbahor (6)	(Uzbekistan) Umid Isoqov (Neftchi, 24 goals) (Uzbekistan) Bakhtiyor Hamidullaev (Andijon, 24 goals)
2000	Dustlik (2) *	Neftchi (5)	Nasaf	(Uzbekistan) Jafar Irismetov (Dustlik, 45 goals)
2001	Neftchi (5)	Pakhtakor (2)	Nasaf (2)	(Uzbekistan) Umid Isoqov (Neftchi, 28 goals)
2002	Pakhtakor (3) *	Neftchi (6)	Qizilqum	(Uzbekistan) Bakhtiyor Hamidullaev (Andijon, 22 goals)
2003	Pakhtakor (4) *	Neftchi (7)	Navbahor (7)	(Uzbekistan) Marsel Idiatullin (Qizilqum, 26 goals)
2004	Pakhtakor (5) *	Neftchi (8)	Navbahor (8)	(Uzbekistan) Shuhrat Mirkholdirshoev (Navbahor, 31 goals)
2005	Pakhtakor (6) *	Mashʼal	Nasaf (3)	(Uzbekistan) Anvar Soliev (Pakhtakor, 29 goals)
2006	Pakhtakor (7) *	Neftchi (9)	Nasaf (4)	(Uzbekistan) Pavel Solomin (Traktor, 21 goals)
2007	Pakhtakor (8) *	Kuruvchi	Mashʼal	(Uzbekistan) Ilhom Moʻminjonov (Kuruvchi, 21 goals)
2008	Bunyodkor *	Pakhtakor (3)	Neftchi	(Uzbekistan) Server Djeparov (Bunyodkor, 19 goals)
2009	Bunyodkor (2)	Pakhtakor (4)	Nasaf (5)	(Brazil) Rivaldo (Bunyodkor, 20 goals)
2010	Bunyodkor (3) *	Pakhtakor (5)	Nasaf (6)	(Uzbekistan) Alisher Kholiqov (Neftchi, 13 goals) (Uzbekistan) Nosirbek Otakuziev (AGMK, 13 goals)
2011	Bunyodkor (4)	Nasaf	Pakhtakor	(Serbia) Miloš Trifunović (Bunyodkor, 17 goals)
2012	Pakhtakor (9)	Bunyodkor (2)	Lokomotiv	(Uzbekistan) Anvar Berdiev (Neftchi, 19 goals)
2013	Bunyodkor (5) *	Lokomotiv	Nasaf (7)	(Ukraine) Oleksandr Pyschur (Bunyodkor, 19 goals)
2014	Pakhtakor (10)	Lokomotiv (2)	Nasaf (8)	(Turkmenistan) Artur Gevorkýan (Nasaf, 18 goals)
2015	Pakhtakor (11)	Lokomotiv (3)	Nasaf (9)	(Uzbekistan) Igor Sergeev (Pakhtakor, 23 goals)
2016	Lokomotiv *	Bunyodkor (3)	Nasaf (10)	(Uzbekistan) Temurkhuja Abdukholiqov (Lokomotiv, 22 goals)
2017	Lokomotiv (2) *	Nasaf (2)	Pakhtakor (2)	(Uzbekistan) Marat Bikmaev (Lokomotiv, 26 goals)

As Uzbekistan Super League

Season	Champions	Runner-up	Third place	Top scorer
2018	Lokomotiv (3)	Pakhtakor (6)	Navbahor (9)	(Brazil) Tiago Bezerra (Pakhtakor, 17 goals)
2019	Pakhtakor (12) *	Lokomotiv (4)	Bunyodkor	(Serbia) Dragan Ćeran (Pakhtakor, 23 goals)
2020	Pakhtakor (13) *	Nasaf (3)	AGMK	(Serbia) Dragan Ćeran (Pakhtakor, 21 goals)
2021	Pakhtakor (14)	Sogdiana	AGMK (2)	(Serbia) Dragan Ćeran (Pakhtakor, 16 goals)
2022	Pakhtakor (15)	Navbahor	Nasaf (11)	(Serbia) Dragan Ćeran (Pakhtakor, 20 goals)
2023	Pakhtakor (16)	Nasaf (4)	Navbahor (10)	(Serbia) Dragan Ćeran (Pakhtakor, 13 goals)
2024	Nasaf	AGMK	Navbahor (11)	(Serbia) Dragan Ćeran (Pakhtakor, 13 goals)
2025	Neftchi (6)	Pakhtakor	Nasaf	(Uzbekistan) Igor Sergeev (Pakhtakor, 20 goals)

== Performance by club ==
Club	Winners	Runners-up	Third Place	Winning seasons
Pakhtakor	16	7	2	1992*, 1998, 2002, 2003, 2004, 2005, 2006, 2007, 2012, 2014, 2015, 2019, 2020, 2021, 2022, 2023
Neftchi	6	9	1	1992*, 1993, 1994, 1995, 2001, 2025
Bunyodkor	5	3	1	2008, 2009, 2010, 2011, 2013
Lokomotiv	3	4	1	2016, 2017, 2018
Dustlik	2	-	-	1999, 2000
Nasaf	1	4	12	2024
Navbahor	1	1	11	1996
MHSK	1	1	1	1997
AGMK	-	1	2	
Mashʼal	-	1	1	
Sogdiana	-	1	1	
Bukhara	-	1	-	
Qizilqum	-	-	1	

* Both teams were awarded with the title.
Defunct teams marked in Italics.

== All-time table ==
All-time table of league, as of end of the 2024 season

Pos	Team	Seasons	Points	Played	Won	Drawn	Lost	G.F.	G.A.	1	2	3	Best
1	Pakhtakor	33	2058	968	651	159	158	2128	820	16	6	2	1
2	Neftchi	30	1672	890	504	160	226	1667	942	5	9	1	1
3	Navbahor	33	1506	968	450	209	309	1556	1114	1	1	11	1
4	Nasaf	28	1494	816	443	175	198	1398	847	1	4	11	1
5	Bukhara	29	1121	864	325	146	393	1128	1314	0	1	0	2
6	Sogdiana	29	1047	856	293	168	395	1081	1341	0	1	1	2
7	Bunyodkor	18	1004	508	299	111	100	870	435	5	3	1	1
8	Andijon	28	945	818	256	177	385	1066	1329	0	0	0	5
9	Metallurg	27	930	782	253	171	358	925	1169	0	0	0	5
10	Dinamo	25	895	758	253	136	369	912	1119	0	0	0	4
11	Qizilqum	25	890	722	252	161	309	851	1022	0	0	1	3
12	Lokomotiv	17	877	486	254	115	169	836	633	3	4	1	1
13	Mash'al	19	744	538	214	102	223	673	725	0	1	1	2
14	AGMK	17	669	478	189	102	183	678	650	0	1	2	2
15	Kokand 1912	17	634	516	180	94	252	670	872	0	0	0	5
16	Traktor	16	621	490	178	87	225	684	814	0	0	0	4
17	Surkhon	18	572	530	158	98	263	605	945	0	0	0	6
18	Dustlik	11	559	346	169	52	125	669	532	2	0	0	1
19	Shurtan	12	381	340	109	54	177	393	566	0	0	0	4
20	MHSK	7	362	216	106	44	66	420	335	1	1	1	1
21	Khorazm	8	230	248	62	44	142	281	518	0	0	0	7
22	Zarafshon Navoiy	6	217	196	60	37	99	236	355	0	0	0	9
23	Yangiyer	7	205	216	56	37	123	266	385	0	0	0	10
24	Orol	5	155	164	44	23	97	171	329	0	0	0	11
25	Kosonsoy	5	145	156	40	25	91	171	305	0	0	0	8
26	Guliston	5	119	154	34	17	103	142	340	0	0	0	14
27	Atlaschi	4	118	124	34	16	74	149	280	0	0	0	7
28	Chirchiq	4	103	122	26	25	71	130	240	0	0	0	14
29	Tupalang-Sariosiyo	3	96	86	28	12	46	103	146	0	0	0	9
30	Kimyogar-Chirchiq	3	96	104	25	21	58	113	193	0	0	0	14
31	Olympik	3	91	78	21	28	29	79	98	0	0	0	6
32	Akademiya Toshkent	1	59	34	16	11	7	72	45	0	0	0	5
33	Semurg Angren	2	57	72	15	12	45	99	200	0	0	0	12
34	Turon	2	33	52	6	15	31	32	88	0	0	0	13
35	Sementchi	1	31	30	8	7	15	39	64	0	0	0	15
36	Chilonzor	1	30	34	8	6	20	51	70	0	0	0	16
37	Shakhrikhon	1	28	32	7	7	18	25	67	0	0	0	15
38	Obod	1	24	30	6	6	18	25	51	0	0	0	14
39	Vobkent	1	15	30	3	6	21	23	70	0	0	0	16
40	Uz-Dong-Ju.	1	13	30	2	7	21	17	65	0	0	0	16

Competing in Super League
Competing in Pro League (2nd tier)
Competing in First League (3rd tier)
Club disappeared

== Players records ==
=== Top scorers ===
As of 2025

Place	Name	Years	Number of goals
1	Anvar Berdiev	1995—2019	225
2	Zafar Kholmurodov	1997—2012	200
3	Shuhrat Mirkholdirshoev	2000—2014	194
4	Bakhtiyor Hamidullaev	1997—2011	178
5	Jafar Irismetov	1993—2012	174
6	Umid Isoqov	1994—2009	171
7	Ravshan Bozorov	1992—2007	171
8	Anvarjon Soliev	1996—2015	164
9	Oybek Usmankhojaev	1992—2005	157
10	Dragan Ćeran	2016—hozirgacha	150
11	Temurkhuja Abdukholiqov	2010—	133
12	Rustam Durmonov	1992—2002	133
13	Farid Khabibulin	1992—2004	131
14	Mukhtor Kurbonov	1993—2009	128
15	Numon Khasanov	1992—2009	125
16	Igor Sergeev	2011—	119
16	Nosirbek Otakuziev	2003—2017	117
17	Server Djeparov	2000—2019	113
18	Shuhrat Rahmonqulov	1992—2005	108
19	Nematullo Quttiboev	1992—2007	106
20	Shakhboz Erkinov	2003—2024	105
21	Artur Gevorkýan	2007—2018	105
22	Oleg Shatskikh	1993—2003	105
23	Vali Keldiev	1992—2006	104
24	Marat Bikmaev	2003—2023	103
25	Zayniddin Tadjiyev	2001—2015	102

=== Top players ===
As of 2025

Place	Name	Years	Number of games
1	Asror Aliqulov	1995—2015	520
2	Jasur Hasanov	1999—2024	505
3	Anvar Berdiev	1995—2019	505
4	Ignatiy Nesterov	2001—2023	466
5	Anvar Gafurov	2000—2020	455
6	Khikmat Khashimov	1998—2017	453
7	Ilkhom Yunusov	2000—2018	431
8	Botir Qoraev	1999—2017	428
9	Erkin Boydullayev	2002—2023	428
10	Vali Keldiev	1992—2006	415
11	Hayrulla Karimov	1996—2016	410
12	Ruziqul Berdiev	1992—2008	408
13	Abdumajid Toirov	1996—2013	406
14	Anvarjon Soliev	1996—2015	406
15	Numon Khasanov	1992—2009	402
16	Mukhtor Kurbonov	1992—2012	402
17	Shavkat Salomov	2000—2022	368
18	Stanislav Andreev	2006—	366
19	Mansur Saidov	2000—2021	373
20	Nosirbek Otakuziev	2003—2017	351
21	Islom Tukhtakhujaev	2008—	340
22	Temurkhuja Abdukholiqov	2010—	336
23	Artur Gevorkyan	2007—2018	330
24	Shukhrat Mukhammadiev	2007—	324
25	Maʼmur Ikromov	2003—2022	323

== List of winners and top scorers by season ==
In the first season, Valeriy Kechinov became the top scorer with 24 goals. In the 2000 season, Jafar Irismetov became the top scorer for the "Dustlik" team, scoring 45 goals, a result that is still considered a record for a single season.

Season	Champions	Runners-up	Third places
1992 ^{1}	Pakhtakor	Neftchi Fergana	Sogdiana
1993	Neftchi Fergana	Pakhtakor	Navbahor Namangan
1994	Neftchi Fergana	Nurafshon Bukhara	Navbahor Namangan
1995	Neftchi Fergana	MHSK	Navbahor Namangan
1996	Navbahor Namangan	Neftchi Fergana	MHSK
1997	MHSK	Neftchi Fergana	Navbahor Namangan
1998	Pakhtakor	Neftchi Fergana	Navbahor Namangan
1999	Dustlik	Neftchi Fergana	Navbahor Namangan
2000	Dustlik	Neftchi Fergana	Nasaf Qarshi
2001	Neftchi Fergana	Pakhtakor	Nasaf Qarshi
2002	Pakhtakor	Neftchi Fergana	Qizilqum Zarafshon
2003	Pakhtakor	Neftchi Fergana	Navbahor Namangan
2004	Pakhtakor	Neftchi Fergana	Navbahor Namangan
2005	Pakhtakor	Mash'al Mubarek	Nasaf Qarshi
2006	Pakhtakor	Neftchi Fergana	Nasaf Qarshi
2007	Pakhtakor	Kuruvchi	Mash'al Mubarek
2008 ^{2}	Bunyodkor	Pakhtakor	Neftchi Fergana
2009	FC Bunyodkor	Pakhtakor	Nasaf Qarshi
2010	FC Bunyodkor	Pakhtakor	Nasaf Qarshi
2011	FC Bunyodkor	Nasaf Qarshi	Pakhtakor
2012	Pakhtakor	FC Bunyodkor	Lokomotiv Tashkent
2013	FC Bunyodkor	Lokomotiv Tashkent	Nasaf Qarshi
2014	Pakhtakor	Lokomotiv Tashkent	Nasaf Qarshi
2015	Pakhtakor	Lokomotiv Tashkent	Nasaf Qarshi
2016	Lokomotiv Tashkent	Nasaf Qarshi	FC Bunyodkor
2017	Lokomotiv Tashkent	Nasaf Qarshi	Pakhtakor
2018	Lokomotiv Tashkent	Pakhtakor	Navbahor Namangan
2019	Pakhtakor	Lokomotiv Tashkent	FC Bunyodkor
2020	Pakhtakor	Nasaf Qarshi	AGMK
2021	Pakhtakor	Sogdiana	AGMK
2022	Pakhtakor	Navbahor Namangan	Nasaf Qarshi
2023	Pakhtakor	Nasaf Qarshi	Navbahor Namangan
2024	Nasaf Qarshi	AGMK	Navbahor Namangan
2025	Neftchi Fergana	Pakhtakor	Nasaf Qarshi
^{1}Oliy League tournament^{2}Uzbekistan Professional Football League tournament^{3}Super League tournament

== Sponsorship ==
From 1992 to 2017, the Uzbekistan Super League had no title sponsorship rights with any companies. Only starting from 2018 Uzbekistan Super League have got title League sponsor. On 4 April 2018 Uzbekistan Football Association vice-president Umid Akhmadjonov and IBT, the official PepsiCo bottler, reached an agreement that PepsiCo would become the official League sponsor for the 2018 season.

Period	Sponsor	Name
1992–2017	No sponsor	Oliy Liga
2018	Pepsi	Pepsi Uzbekistan Super League
2019–2023	Coca-Cola	Coca-Cola Uzbekistan Super League
2024–present	Artel	Artel Uzbekistan Super League

== See also ==
- List of foreign football players in Uzbekistan
- Uzbekistan Pro League
- Uzbekistan First League
- Uzbekistan Second League
- Uzbekistan Cup
- Uzbekistan League Cup
