= 1999 Uzbek League =

Uzbek League
- Season: 1999
- Champions: Do'stlik

The 1999 Uzbek League season was the eighth edition of top-level football in Uzbekistan since independence from the Soviet Union in 1992.

== Overview ==
It was contested by 16 teams, and Do'stlik won the championship.

== League standings ==
Pos	Team	Pld	W	D	L	GF	GA	GD	Pts
1	Do'stlik	30	20	4	6	79	45	+34	64
2	Neftchi Farg'ona	30	20	3	7	71	34	+37	63
3	Navbahor Namangan	30	18	7	5	55	34	+21	61
4	Pakhtakor Tashkent	30	18	4	8	69	42	+27	58
5	Samarqand	30	15	8	7	57	38	+19	53
6	Andijan	30	12	7	11	53	50	+3	43
7	Xorazm Urganch	30	12	5	13	39	40	−1	41
8	Metalourg Bekabad	30	11	6	13	41	44	−3	39
9	Buxoro	30	10	7	13	44	50	−6	37
10	Temiryo'lchi Qo'qon	30	11	3	16	53	79	−26	36
11	Nasaf Qarshi	30	10	5	15	42	54	−12	35
12	Traktor Tashkent	30	9	7	14	42	62	−20	34
13	Sogdiana Jizak	30	8	8	14	43	52	−9	32
14	Zarafshon Navoi	30	8	7	15	37	51	−14	31
15	Surkhon Termez	30	7	9	14	44	54	−10	30
16	Yangiyer	30	3	6	21	22	62	−40	15
