= FC Nasaf =

Uzbek professional football club

- Full name: Football Club Nasaf
- Nickname: The Dragons
- Founded: 1986; 40 years ago
- Ground: Markaziy Stadium
- Capacity: 21,000
- Chairman: Shukhrat Aslanov
- Manager: Ruziqul Berdiev
- League: Uzbekistan Super League
- 2025: Uzbekistan Super League, 3rd of 16
- Website: www.fcnasaf.uz
Home colours	Away colours

Football Club Nasaf (Uzbek: "Nasaf" futbol klubi), commonly referred to as Nasaf Qarshi, is a professional football club based in Qarshi (Qashqadaryo Region), Uzbekistan. Founded in 1986, the club competes in the Uzbekistan Super League.

== History ==
=== Name changes ===
- 1986–1991: Geolog (Uzbek: Геолог)
- 1992: Pakhtachi (Uzbek: Пахтачи)
- 1996: Dinamo-Nasaf (Uzbek: Динамо-Насаф)
- 1993–1995, 1996–: FC Nasaf

The club was founded in 1986 under the name Geolog. Since 1997, the club has played in the highest level league in Uzbekistan. FC Nasaf is one of the leading clubs in Uzbekistan. It finished 6th in its first Uzbek League season in 1997. In 2000, the club finished third.

It has represented Uzbekistan in continental tournaments where its best result has been reaching semi-finals of Asian Club Championship, prior to the launch of the new Asian Champions League.

=== 2010 renovation ===
In 2010, the club bought a number of players and changed its squad significantly as well as the head coach. Moreover, the main venue of the club was reconstructed upon the end of the 2008–09 season. The head coach Viktor Kumykov was fired after team faced defeats against league main opponents Bunyodkor and Pakhtakor. On 10 August 2010, Anatoliy Demyanenko, once the player of the year in the former USSR and former manager of Dynamo Kyiv, was introduced as the new head coach during the first round break of the 2009–10 season. Nasaf appoints Anatoliy Demyanenko as head coach.

In the 2011 season, Nasaf represented the country in AFC Cup and finished group stage with excellent result of sixth consecutive victories, beating Al Tilal in last group stage match. In March and April Nasaf went unbeaten in 12 games, winning 10 and drawing two. On 29 October 2011 in Final match Nasaf won Kuwait SC with 2–1 and became the first Uzbekistan team to win the AFC Cup. In Uzbek League club finished second, playing last and deciding match of championship against Pakhtakor and scoring a last-minute penalty to draw 1–1.

On 13 January 2012, IFFHS published the Top 350 club list and Nasaf Qarshi placed on 98th position On 3 March 2012 IFFHS published its rating of Top 400 clubs (1st March 2011 – 29th February 2012) where Nasaf shared 89th place with BATE Borisov.

In the 2013 season, the club finished 3rd after Lokomotiv Tashkent and gained promotion to 2nd qualifying play-off round of 2014 AFC Champions League. In Uzbek Cup club played in final 3rd time in row and lost to Bunyodkor with 1–2. On 8 February 2014 in Doha in 2014 AFC Champions League qualifying play-off match against El Jaish Nasaf lost by 5–1. Nasaf finished 2015 season again third and secured place in AFC Champions League in 2015. The club won in 2015 for the first time in its history Uzbek Cup, defeating Bunyodkor by 2–1 in final match on 17 November 2015 in Jizzakh.

=== Domestic history ===
Season	League									Uzbek Cup	Top goalscorer		Manager
Season	Div.	Pos.	Pl.	W	D	L	GS	GA	P	Uzbek Cup	Name	League	Manager
1997	1st	6th	34	15	8	11	68	57	53	Quarterfinal			(Uzbekistan) Victor Borisov
1998	1st	5th	30	12	9	9	43	31	45	Quarterfinal			(Uzbekistan) Victor Borisov (Uzbekistan) Victor Makarov
1999	1st	11th	30	10	5	15	42	54	35	Semifinal			(Uzbekistan) Victor Makarov
2000	1st	3rd	38	26	7	5	92	52	85	Semifinal			(Uzbekistan) Bakhodir Davlatov
2001	1st	3rd	34	22	5	7	82	47	71	Semifinal			(Uzbekistan) Bakhodir Davlatov
2002	1st	4th	30	18	4	8	59	38	58	Semifinal			(Uzbekistan) Bakhodir Davlatov
2003	1st	4th	30	19	3	8	58	40	60	Runners Up			(Uzbekistan) Bakhodir Davlatov
2004	1st	4th	26	17	3	6	66	31	54	Last 16	(Uzbekistan) Zafar Kholmurodov	29	(Uzbekistan) Bakhodir Davlatov
2005	1st	3rd	26	16	3	7	50	31	51	Quarterfinal	(Uzbekistan) Zafar Kholmurodov	24	(Ukraine) Oleh Morozov
2006	1st	3rd	30	22	4	4	63	33	70	Last 16	(Turkmenistan) Witaliý Alikperow	15	(Uzbekistan) Bakhrom Khakimov
2007	1st	6th	30	13	5	12	43	43	44	Quarterfinal	(Uzbekistan) Zafar Kholmurodov	17	(Kazakhstan) Vladimir Fomichyov
2008	1st	9th	30	10	5	15	28	36	35	Last 16			(Russia) Viktor Kumykov
2009	1st	3rd	30	16	7	7	48	27	55	Semifinal			(Russia) Viktor Kumykov
2010	1st	3rd	26	13	7	6	30	20	46	Round of 16	(Uzbekistan) Ilkhom Shomurodov	6	(Russia) Viktor Kumykov (Ukraine) Anatoliy Demyanenko
2011	1st	2nd	26	15	8	3	43	15	53	Runners Up			(Ukraine) Anatoliy Demyanenko
2012	1st	4th	26	14	7	5	37	20	49	Runners Up	(Turkmenistan) Artur Geworkýan	9	(Uzbekistan) Ruziqul Berdiyev (Uzbekistan) Usmon Toshev
2013	1st	3rd	26	18	4	4	64	27	58	Runners Up	(Turkmenistan) Artur Geworkýan	.	(Uzbekistan) Ruziqul Berdiyev
2014	1st	3rd	26	16	7	3	45	21	55	Semifinal	(Turkmenistan) Artur Geworkýan	.	(Uzbekistan) Ruziqul Berdiyev
2015	1st	3rd	26	19	5	6	46	20	62	Champions	(Uzbekistan) Ilkhom Shomurodov	12	(Uzbekistan) Ruziqul Berdiyev
2016	1st	3rd	30	18	9	3	46	13	63	Runners Up	(Serbia) Dragan Ćeran	12	(Uzbekistan) Ruziqul Berdiyev
2017	1st	2nd	30	20	2	8	58	18	62	Semifinal	(Serbia) Dragan Ćeran	19	(Uzbekistan) Ruziqul Berdiyev
2018	1st	7th	20	9	7	4	24	16	34	Round of 16	(Uzbekistan) Bobur Abdikholikov	13	(Uzbekistan) Ruziqul Berdiyev
2019	1st	7th	26	9	6	11	34	27	33	Semifinal	(Uzbekistan) Khumoyun Murtozoyev	14	(Uzbekistan) Ruziqul Berdiyev
2020	1st	2nd	26	15	8	3	47	19	53	Semifinal	(Uzbekistan) Bobur Abdikholikov	17	(Uzbekistan) Ruziqul Berdiyev
2021	1st	4th	26	13	6	7	42	24	45	Champions	(Uzbekistan) Khusayin Norchaev	13	(Uzbekistan) Ruziqul Berdiyev
2022	1st	3rd	26	13	10	3	37	16	49	Champions	(Uzbekistan) Khusayin Norchaev	9	(Uzbekistan) Ruziqul Berdiyev
2023	1st	2nd	26	13	9	4	31	16	48	Champions			(Uzbekistan) Ruziqul Berdiyev
2024	1st	1st	26	15	7	4	35	18	52	Group Stage	(Serbia) Zoran Marušić	9	(Uzbekistan) Ruziqul Berdiyev
2025	1st	3rd	30	16	11	3	51	23	59	Group Stage	(Uzbekistan) Khusain Norchaev	14	(Uzbekistan) Ruziqul Berdiyev

== Continental record ==
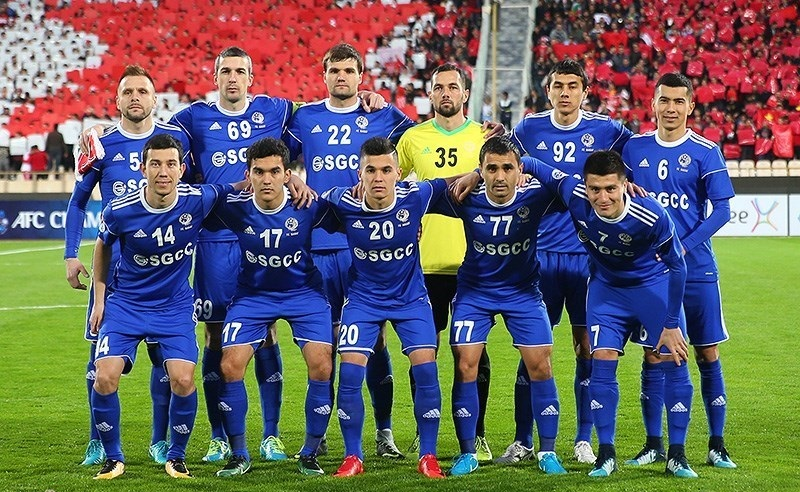
FC Nasaf line-up against Persepolis at the 2018 AFC Champions League

Competition	Pld	W	D	L	GF	GA
Asian Club Championship	9	5	2	2	17	14
AFC Cup	19	13	3	3	49	13
AFC Champions League	28	8	6	14	26	41
Total	56	26	11	19	92	68

Season	Competition	Round	Club	Home	Away	Aggregate
2001–02	Asian Club Championship	First round	(Turkmenistan) FK Köpetdag Aşgabat	1–0	3–0	4–0
2001–02	Asian Club Championship	Second round	(Tajikistan) Umed Dushanbe	4–1	3–2	7–3
2001–02	Asian Club Championship	Quarter-finals	Al-Kuwait	1–1		2nd
2001–02	Asian Club Championship	Quarter-finals	(Iran) Esteghlal	1–1		2nd
2001–02	Asian Club Championship	Quarter-finals	(United Arab Emirates) Al-Wahda	2–1		2nd
2001–02	Asian Club Championship	Semi-finals	(South Korea) Suwon Samsung Bluewings	0–3		
2001–02	Asian Club Championship	Third place match	(Iran) Esteghlal	2–5		
2010	AFC Cup	Group C	(Lebanon) Al-Ahed	4–0	4–0	2nd
2010	AFC Cup	Group C	(Syria) Al-Jaish	2–1	1–1	2nd
2010	AFC Cup	Group C	(Kuwait) Kazma	1–2	0–0	2nd
2010	AFC Cup	Round of 16	(Syria) Al-Karamah	0–1		
2011	AFC Cup	Group A	(Lebanon) Al-Ansar	3–0	4–1	1st
2011	AFC Cup	Group A	(Yemen) Al-Tilal	7–1	3–2	1st
2011	AFC Cup	Group A	(India) Dempo	9–0	4–0	1st
2011	AFC Cup	Round of 16	(Jordan) Al-Faisaly	2–1		
2011	AFC Cup	Quarter-finals	(Thailand) Chonburi	0–1	1–0	1–1 (a.e.t.) (4–3 p)
2011	AFC Cup	Semi-finals	(Jordan) Al-Wehdat	1–0	1–1	2–1
2011	AFC Cup	Final	Al-Kuwait	2–1		
2012	AFC Champions League	Group A	(United Arab Emirates) Al-Jazira	2–4	1–4	4th
2012	AFC Champions League	Group A	(Iran) Esteghlal	0–2	0–0	4th
2012	AFC Champions League	Group A	(Qatar) Al-Rayyan	0–1	1–3	4th
2014	AFC Champions League	Qualifying play-off round 2	(Qatar) El Jaish	1–5		
2015	AFC Champions League	Group D	(Iran) Tractor Sazi	2–1	2–1	3rd
2015	AFC Champions League	Group D	(Saudi Arabia) Al-Ahli	0–0	1–2	3rd
2015	AFC Champions League	Group D	(United Arab Emirates) Al-Ahli	0–1	0–0	3rd
2016	AFC Champions League	Group D	(Saudi Arabia) Al-Ahli	2–1	1–2	4th
2016	AFC Champions League	Group D	(Qatar) El Jaish	0–0	0–1	4th
2016	AFC Champions League	Group D	(United Arab Emirates) Al-Ain	1–1	0–2	4th
2017	AFC Champions League	Preliminary round 2	(Bahrain) Al-Hidd	4–0		
2017	AFC Champions League	Play-off round	(Saudi Arabia) Al-Fateh	0–1		
2018	AFC Champions League	Play-off round	(Jordan) Al-Faisaly	5–1		
2018	AFC Champions League	Group C	(Iran) Persepolis	0–0	0–3	3rd
2018	AFC Champions League	Group C	(United Arab Emirates) Al-Wasl	1–0	2–1	3rd
2018	AFC Champions League	Group C	(Qatar) Al-Sadd	1–0	0–4	3rd
2021	AFC Cup	Group F	(Kyrgyzstan) Alay	4–0		1st
2021	AFC Cup	Group F	(Tajikistan) Khujand	3–0		1st
2021	AFC Cup	Group F	(Turkmenistan) Altyn Asyr	2–0		1st
2021	AFC Cup	Central Asia Zonal final	(Turkmenistan) Ahal	3–2		
2021	AFC Cup	Inter-zone play-off semi-finals	(India) ATK Mohun Bagan	6–0		
2021	AFC Cup	Inter-zone play-off final	(Hong Kong) Lee Man	3–2 (a.e.t.)		
2021	AFC Cup	Final	(Bahrain) Al-Muharraq	0–3		
2022	AFC Champions League	Play-off round	(United Arab Emirates) Baniyas	2–0		
2022	AFC Champions League	Group E	(Qatar) Al-Sadd	3–1	1–1	2nd
2022	AFC Champions League	Group E	(Jordan) Al-Wehdat	2–0	2–2	2nd
2022	AFC Champions League	Group E	(Saudi Arabia) Al-Faisaly	0–1	0–0	2nd
2022	AFC Champions League	Round of 16	(Saudi Arabia) Al-Shabab	0–2		
2023–24	AFC Champions League					
2023–24	AFC Champions League	Group B	(Qatar) Al Sadd	3–1	2–2	1st
2023–24	AFC Champions League	Group B	(Jordan) Al-Faisaly	3–1	1–0	1st
2023–24	AFC Champions League	Group B	(United Arab Emirates) Sharjah	1–1	0–1	1st
2023–24	AFC Champions League	Round of 16	(United Arab Emirates) Al Ain	0–0	1–2	1–2
2024–25	AFC Champions League Two					
2024–25	AFC Champions League Two	Group D	(United Arab Emirates) Shabab Al Ahli	2–1	2–3	4th
2024–25	AFC Champions League Two	Group D	(Jordan) Al-Hussein	1–2	1–2	4th
2024–25	AFC Champions League Two	Group D	Al-Kuwait	1–1	1–2	4th
2025–26	AFC Champions League Elite					
2025–26	AFC Champions League Elite	League stage	(Saudi Arabia) Al-Ahli	—N/a	2–4	12th
2025–26	AFC Champions League Elite	League stage	(Saudi Arabia) Al-Hilal	2–3	—N/a	12th
2025–26	AFC Champions League Elite	League stage	(United Arab Emirates) Shabab Al Ahli	—N/a	1–4	12th
2025–26	AFC Champions League Elite	League stage	(United Arab Emirates) Al Wahda	1–2	—N/a	12th
2025–26	AFC Champions League Elite	League stage	(Iran) Tractor	0–1	—N/a	12th
2025–26	AFC Champions League Elite	League stage	(Saudi Arabia) Al-Ittihad	—N/a	0–1	12th
2025–26	AFC Champions League Elite	League stage	(Iraq) Al-Shorta	1–1	—N/a	12th
2025–26	AFC Champions League Elite	League stage	(United Arab Emirates) Sharjah	—N/a	2–1	12th

== Stadium ==
Nasaf plays its home matches at the Markaziy Stadium, which was built in 2006. The first match at the new stadium was played between Nasaf Qarshi and Uz-Dong-Ju Andijon on 8 August 2008. The stadium was the venue of the AFC Cup final on 29 October 2011.

== Players ==
=== Current squad ===
As of 29 July, 2026

Note: Flags indicate national team as defined under FIFA eligibility rules; some limited exceptions apply. Players may hold more than one non-FIFA nationality.

No.	Pos.	Nation	Player
1	GK	UZB	Abduvohid Nematov
2	DF	UZB	Alibek Davronov
4	DF	UZB	Akramjon Komilov
5	DF	UZB	Golib Gaybullaev
6	MF	UZB	Sardorbek Bakhromov
7	FW	KOS	Adenis Shala
8	DF	UZB	Zafarmurod Abdurakhmatov
10	FW	UZB	Bobur Abdikholikov
14	MF	UZB	Sharof Mukhiddinov
15	MF	UZB	Oybek Rustamov
17	MF	UZB	Murodbek Rakhmatov

No.	Pos.	Nation	Player
18	MF	UZB	Bekjon Rakhmatov
20	FW	NGA	Yusuf Otubanjo
21	GK	UZB	Samandar Muratbaev
22	DF	UZB	Diyorbek Abdunazarov
23	MF	UZB	Dilshod Murtozoev
27	MF	UZB	Yashnarbek Berdirakhmonov
32	DF	UZB	Kuvonchbek Khushvaktov
80	FW	UZB	Davronbek Usmonov
82	GK	UZB	Asilbek Numonov
92	DF	UZB	Umar Eshmurodov
99	MF	NGA	Kingsley Sokari

=== Out on loan ===
Note: Flags indicate national team as defined under FIFA eligibility rules; some limited exceptions apply. Players may hold more than one non-FIFA nationality.

No.	Pos.	Nation	Player
33	DF	UZB	Bakhodir Khalilov (at Lochin Qarshi until 31 December 2026)

== Personnel ==
=== Current technical staff ===
Position	Name
Manager	Ruziqul Berdiev
Assistant manager	Shukhrat Toshpulatov
Fitness coach	Ilnur Sibagatullin
Goalkeeping coach	Asliddin Khsanov
Doctor	Maruf Berdiev
Physio	Khamza Mavlonov

== Management ==
Office	Name
President	Shukhrat Aslanov
Team manager	Alisher Yusupov
Sports director	Sergiy Kucherenko
Executive director	Kobiljon Shodmonov
Media officer	Sardor Nurov

== Honours ==
=== Domestic ===
- Uzbekistan Super League
  - Winners (1): 2024
  - Runners-up (4): 2011, 2017, 2020, 2023
- Uzbekistan Cup
  - Winners (4): 2015, 2021, 2022, 2023
  - Runners-up (5): 2003, 2011, 2012, 2013, 2016
- Uzbekistan Super Cup
  - Winners (4): 2016, 2023, 2024, 2025
  - Runners-up (2): 2021, 2022

=== Continental ===
- AFC Cup
  - Winners (1): 2011
  - Runners-up (1): 2021
- Asian Club Championship
  - Semi-final: 2002

== Managerial history ==
Name	Period
(Uzbekistan) Victor Borisov	1997–98
(Uzbekistan) Victor Makarov	1998–99
(Uzbekistan) Bakhodir Davlatov	2000–04
(Ukraine) Oleh Morozov	2005
(Uzbekistan) Bakhrom Khakimov	2006
(Kazakhstan) Vladimir Fomichyov	2007
(Russia) Victor Kumykov	2008–10
(Ukraine) Anatoliy Demyanenko	12 Aug 2010 – 4 Jan 2012
(Uzbekistan) Ruziqul Berdiev	9 Jan 2012 – May 2012
(Uzbekistan) Usmon Toshev	May 2012 – Nov 2012
(Uzbekistan) Ruziqul Berdiev	Nov 2012 – present
