= 2001 Uzbek League =

Uzbek League
- Season: 2001
- Champions: Neftchi Farg'ona

The 2001 Uzbek League season was the tenth edition of top-level football in Uzbekistan since independence from the Soviet Union in 1992.

== Overview ==
It was contested by 18 teams, and Neftchi Farg'ona won the championship.

== League standings ==
Pos	Team	Pld	W	D	L	GF	GA	GD	Pts
1	Neftchi Farg'ona	34	27	3	4	93	27	+66	84
2	Pakhtakor Tashkent	34	23	3	8	72	32	+40	72
3	Nasaf Qarshi	34	22	5	7	82	47	+35	71
4	Navbahor Namangan	34	20	1	13	79	52	+27	61
5	Academia Tashkent	34	16	11	7	72	45	+27	59
6	Qizilqum Zarafshon	34	16	5	13	48	35	+13	53
7	Andijan	34	15	3	16	64	58	+6	48
8	Buxoro	34	15	3	16	57	58	−1	48
9	Do'stlik	34	14	5	15	73	60	+13	47
10	Sogdiana Jizak	34	14	5	15	45	51	−6	47
11	Traktor Tashkent	34	13	7	14	54	58	−4	46
12	Dinamo Samarqand	34	14	3	17	62	68	−6	45
13	Zarafshon Navoi	34	11	7	16	50	59	−9	40
14	Metalourg Bekabad	34	9	12	13	42	60	−18	39
15	Surkhon Termez	34	12	2	20	42	71	−29	38
16	Kimyogar Chirchiq	34	9	7	18	36	60	−24	34
17	Turon Nukus	34	8	6	20	36	77	−41	30
18	Semurg Angren	34	2	4	28	36	125	−89	10
