= 2002 Uzbek League =

11th season of the Uzbek League

Uzbek League
- Season: 2002
- Champions: Pakhtakor Tashkent
- Relegated: Sogdiana Jizzakh; Zarafshon Nawoyi

The 2002 Uzbek League season was the 11th edition of top level football in Uzbekistan since independence from the Soviet Union in 1992.

== Overview ==
It was contested by 16 teams, and Pakhtakor Tashkent won the championship.

== Teams ==
FK Qo'qon and Mash'al Mubarek earned promotion from the First League as champions and runners-up, respectively. Academia Toshkent was replaced by an Olympic club aimed at preparing players for the national team, but the club was dissolved after relocating to Pakhtakor Tashkent. The vacant spot was filled by Surkhon Termiz, who had finished 15th in 2001, with their relegation being nullified.

Club	Location	Stadium	Capacity
FK Andijan	Andijan	Bobur Arena	18,360
Samarqand-Dinamo	Samarkand	Dynamo Samarkand Stadium	13,800
Do'stlik	Tashkent	Lokomotiv Stadium	8,000
FK Buxoro	Bukhara	Buxoro Arena	22,700
Mash'al Mubarek	Mubarek	Bahrom Vafoev Stadium	10,000
Metallurg Bekabad	Bekabad	Metallurg Bekabad Stadium	5,000
Nasaf Qarshi	Qarshi	Markaziy Stadium	21,000
Navbahor Namangan	Namangan	Markaziy Stadium	45,000
Neftchi Farg'ona	Fergana	Fargona Stadium	
Pakhtakor Tashkent	Tashkent	Pakhtakor Central Stadium	35,000
Qizilqum Zarafshon	Navoiy	Yoshlar Stadium	12,500
FK Qo'qon	Kokand	Kokand Markaziy Stadium	10,500
Sogdiana Jizzakh	Jizzakh	Sogdiana Stadium	11,650
Surkhon Termez	Termez	Surxon arena	10,000
Traktor Tashkent	Tashkent	Traktor Tashkent Stadium	6,400
Zarafshon Nawoyi	Nawoyi	Markaziy Stadion	

== League standings ==
Pos	Team	Pld	W	D	L	GF	GA	GD	Pts	Qualification or relegation
1	Pakhtakor Tashkent (C)	30	24	2	4	85	22	+63	74	Qualified for the 2002/03 Asian champions league
2	Neftchi Farg'ona	30	22	3	5	82	32	+50	69	
3	Qizilqum Zarafshon	30	18	5	7	67	34	+33	59	
4	Nasaf Qarshi	30	18	4	8	59	38	+21	58	
5	Metallurg Bekabad	30	14	6	10	40	35	+5	48	
6	Navbahor Namangan	30	14	4	12	53	39	+14	46	
7	Buxoro	30	12	5	13	37	53	−16	41	
8	Do'stlik	30	11	2	17	37	49	−12	35	
9	Surkhon Termez	30	10	3	17	38	54	−16	33	
10	Mash'al Mubarek	30	9	6	15	36	53	−17	33	
11	Andijan	30	9	6	15	43	61	−18	33	
12	Traktor Tashkent	30	9	6	15	39	58	−19	33	
13	Dinamo Samarqand	30	9	5	16	24	46	−22	32	
14	Qo'qon	30	10	2	18	31	60	−29	32	
15	Zarafshon Nawoyi (R)	30	9	4	17	38	53	−15	31	Relegated to the First league (2nd tier)
16	Sogdiana Jizzakh (R)	30	8	5	17	33	55	−22	29	Relegated to the First league (2nd tier)

Source: RSSSF
Rules for classification: 1) Points; 2) Goal difference; 3) Goals scored 4) Head-to-head points 5) Head-to-head goal difference 6) Head-to-head
(C) Champions; (R) Relegated
