= FC Dustlik =

Dustlik
- Full name: Do'stlik Futbol Klubi
- Founded: 1963
- Ground: Lokomotiv Stadium
- Capacity: 8,000
- Manager: Aleksey Evstafeev
- League: Uzbekistan Pro League
- 2003: 11th

FC Dustlik (Uzbek: Do'stlik) was an Uzbek football club based in Yangibozor on the collective farm of Dustlik, about 20 km from Tashkent, Tashkent Province. The club were champions of Uzbekistan twice; in 1999 and 2000.

== History ==
=== Names ===
- until 1962 – "Pakhtakor"
- 1963–1991 – "Politotdel" (political department)
- 1992 – "Politotdel-RUOR" (political department – Republican School of Olympic Reserve)
- 1993–1995 – "Politotdel" (political department)
- 1996–2003 – "Dustlik"

=== Domestic history ===
| Season | League | | | | | | | | | Uzbek Cup | Top goalscorer | |
| Season | Div. | Pos. | Pl. | W | D | L | GS | GA | P | Uzbek Cup | Name | League |
|---|---|---|---|---|---|---|---|---|---|---|---|---|
| 1999 | 1st | 1 | 30 | 20 | 4 | 6 | 79 | 45 | 64 | | | |
| 2000 | 1st | 1 | 38 | 30 | 4 | 4 | 108 | 44 | 94 | Winners | | |
| 2001 | 1st | 9 | 34 | 14 | 5 | 15 | 73 | 60 | 47 | | | |
| 2002 | 1st | 8 | 30 | 11 | 2 | 17 | 37 | 49 | 35 | | | |
| 2003 | 1st | 11 | 30 | 10 | 3 | 17 | 40 | 59 | 33 | | | |

=== Continental history ===
| Season | Competition | Round | Club | Home | Away | Aggregate |
|---|---|---|---|---|---|---|
| 2000–01 | Asian Cup Winners' Cup | First round | (Tajikistan) Varzob Dushanbe | w/o^{1} | | |

^{1} FC Dustlik did not show up for the 1st leg in Dushanbe due to the civil war in Tajikistan(?); They were ejected from the competition and fined $10,000.

== Former players ==
- (Uzbekistan) Dmitry An

== Honours ==
- Uzbek League
  - Champions (2): 1999, 2000
- Uzbek Cup
  - Winners (1): 2000
