= List of Pakhtakor FC players =

Pakhtakor is an Uzbek professional football club based in Tashkent, Uzbekistan. The club was formed on 8 April 1956 in Tashkent. The club played its first matches against team of Molotov city, now Perm. From 1956 to 1991 Pakhtakor played in different leagues of USSR. From 1992 club has played in the highest Uzbek Football Division, Uzbekistan Super League. The club plays its matches at Pakhtakor Stadium.

Gennadi Denisov holds the record for most overall appearances, having played 371 matches from 1978 to 1991, ahead of Berador Abduraimov with 358 caps from 1960 to 1974 with interrupts in career for playing in other clubs, and of legendary forward Gennadi Krasnitsky with 300 appearances in 13 seasons played for Pakhtakor.

Gennadi Krasnitsky is club's all-time top scorer with over 200 goals. The 2nd top scorer is Berador Abduraimov with 131 goals. Third all-time top scorer of the club is Igor Shkvyrin with 123 goals.

== List of players ==
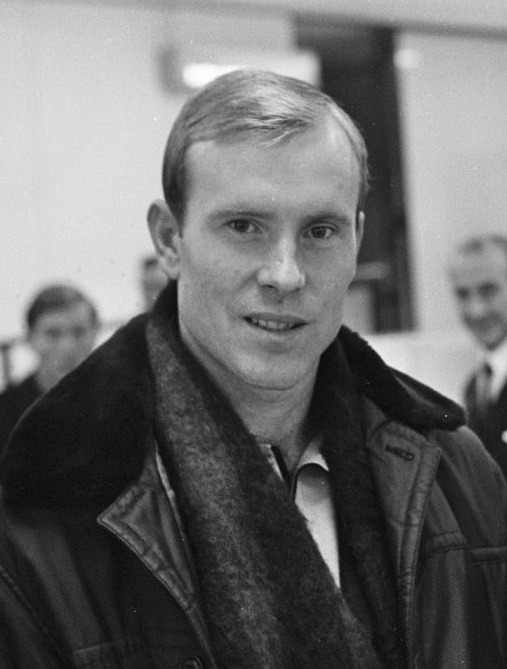
Yuri Pshenichnikov in 1967

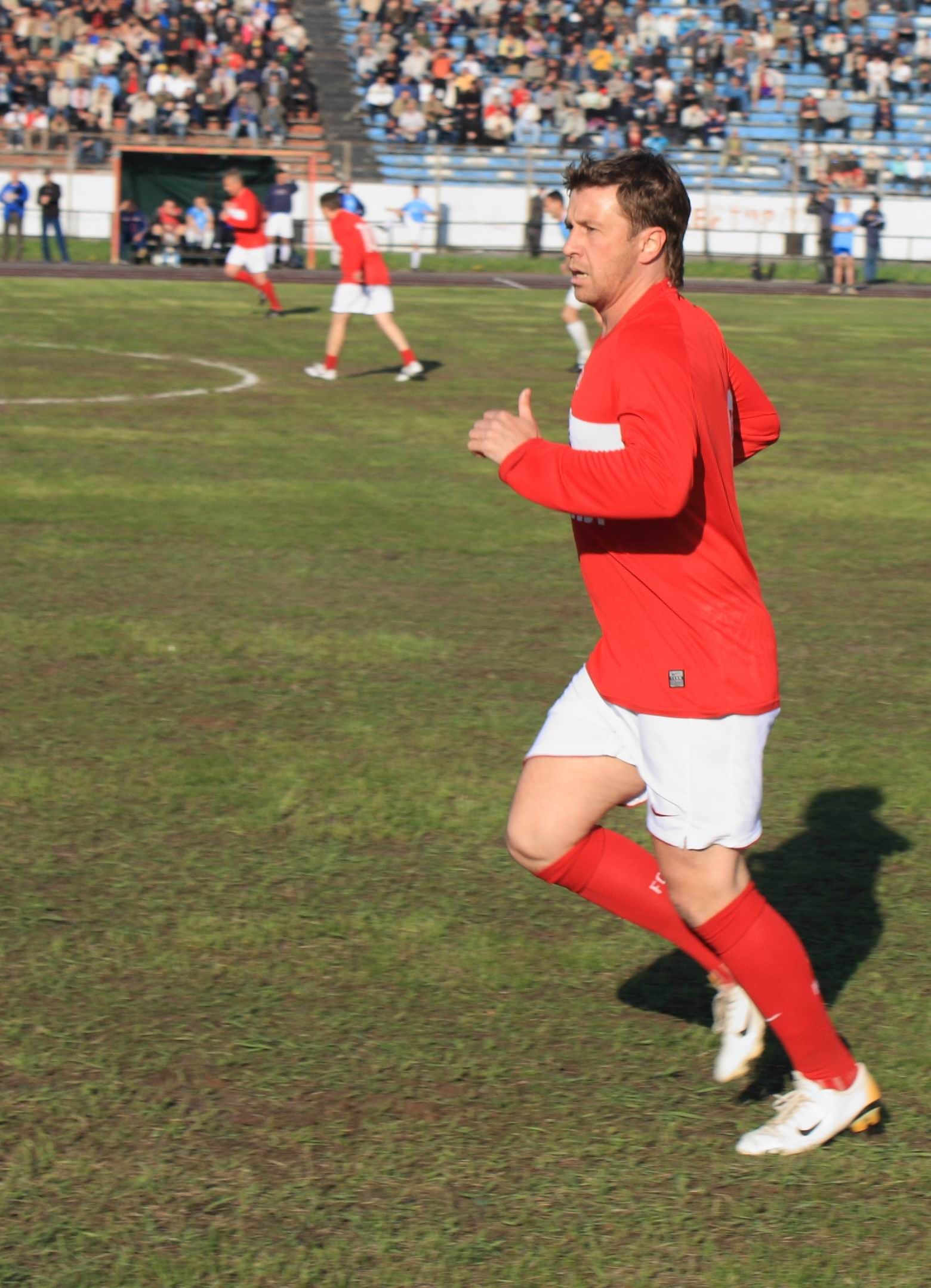
Valery Kechinov played for club in 1992–1993

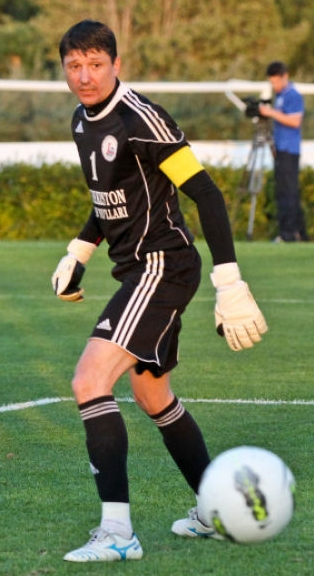
Pavel Bugalo goalkeeper of club in 1992-1999

| Name | Nat | Position^{[NB]} | Pakhtakor career | Appearances | Goals | Notes |
|---|---|---|---|---|---|---|
| Gennadi Krasnitsky | (Soviet Union) | FW | 1958-1970 | 300 | 202 | |
| Berador Abduraimov | (Soviet Union) | FW | 1960-1974 | 358 | 131 | |
| Yuri Pshenichnikov | (Soviet Union) | GK | 1960–1967, 1972 | 198 | - | |
| Alim Ashirov | (Soviet Union) | DF | 1972-1979 | 149 | 5 | |
| Mikhail An | (Soviet Union) | MF | 1970-1979 | 233 | 50 | |
| Nikolai Kulikov | (Soviet Union) | DF | 1977-1979 | 33 | 1 | |
| Vladimir Makarov | (Soviet Union) | FW | 1978-1979 | 42 | 6 | |
| Aleksandr Yanovskiy | (Soviet Union) | GK | 1979-1986, 1988-1990 | 297 | - | |
| Vladimir Fyodorov | (Soviet Union) | FW | 1972-1979 | 187 | 58 | |
| Yuri Zagumennykh | (Soviet Union) | DF | 1977-1979 | 80 | 6 | |
| Manuchar Machaidze | (Soviet Union) | MF | 1980 | 13 | 1 | |
| Andrei Yakubik | (Soviet Union) | MF, FW | 1980—1984 | 119 | 66 | |
| Marat Kabayev | (Soviet Union) | MF, FW | 1980-1990 | 275 | 48 | |
| Sergei Bondarenko | (Soviet Union) | DF | 1982–1990 | 307 | 1 | |
| Edgar Gess | (Soviet Union) (Germany) | MF, FW | 1984–1986 | 93 | 15 | |
| Khoren Oganesian | (Soviet Union) (Armenia) | MF | 1989-1991 | 46 | 9 | |
| Vasilis Hatzipanagis | (Soviet Union) (Greece) | MF | 1972–1975 | 96 | 22 | |
| Valeri Glushakov | (Soviet Union) (Russia) | DF | 1979 | 16 | 1 | |
| Valeri Kechinov | (Soviet Union) (Russia) | MF | 1992–1993 | 38 | 30 | |
| Andrei Piatnitski | (Soviet Union) (Russia) | MF | 1988—1991 | 120 | 25 | |
| Gennadi Denisov | (Soviet Union) (Uzbekistan) | DF | 1978-1986, 1987-1991 | 371 | 32 | |
| Mirjalol Qosimov | (Soviet Union) (Uzbekistan) | MF | 1987-2003 | 193 | 65 | |
| Mustafa Belyalov | (Soviet Union) (Uzbekistan) | DF | 1981-1984, 1988-1990 | | | |
| Ilkhom Sharipov | (Soviet Union) (Uzbekistan) | DF | 1990-1994 | 128 | 15 | |
| Igor Shkvyrin | (Soviet Union) (Uzbekistan) | FW | 1989–1991, 1998–2002 | 196 | 123 | |
| Azamat Abduraimov | (Soviet Union) (Uzbekistan) | FW | 1987–1990, 1996–2000 | 237 | 67 | |
| Oleg Belyakov | (Soviet Union) (Uzbekistan) | GK | 2001, 2003 | 21 | - | |
| Farkhad Magametov | (Soviet Union) (Uzbekistan) | DF | 195-1987, 1990-1992 | | | |
| Ravshan Bozorov | (Soviet Union) (Uzbekistan) | FW | 1995-1996 | 59 | 29 | |
| Ulugbek Ruzimov | (Soviet Union) (Uzbekistan) | DF | 1994-1996 | | | |
| Nikolay Shirshov | (Uzbekistan) (Russia) | DF | 1992-1999 | 159 | 16 | |
| Pavel Bugalo | (Uzbekistan) | GK | 1992-1999 | 172 | - | |
| Shukhrat Maqsudov | (Uzbekistan) | FW | 1991-1996 | | | |
| Andrey Akopyants | (Uzbekistan) | MF, FW | 1996-1999 | 109 | 25 | |
| Ignatiy Nesterov | (Uzbekistan) | GK | 2002–2009 | 192 | - | |
| Odil Ahmedov | (Uzbekistan) | MF | 2006–2010 | 102 | 16 | |
| Server Djeparov | (Uzbekistan) | MF | 2002–2007 | 96 | 60 | |
| Timur Kapadze | (Uzbekistan) | MF | 2002–2007 | 94 | 15 | |
| Leonid Koshelev | (Uzbekistan) | MF | 2001–2007 | 114 | 46 | |
| Kamoliddin Tajiev | (Uzbekistan) | DF | 2002-2011 | 82 | 4 | |
| Zaynitdin Tadjiyev | (Uzbekistan) | FW | 2002-2010 | 135 | 69 | |
| Anvarjon Soliev | (Uzbekistan) | FW | 2001–2007 | 115 | 60 | |
| Alexander Geynrikh | (Uzbekistan) | FW | 2002, 2005, 2007–2011 | 108 | 53 | |

== List Foreign players ==
As of 12 August 2026

| Name | Position | Pakhtakor career | Appearances | Goals |
|---|---|---|---|---|
| (Serbia) Dragan Ćeran | FW | 2018–2024 | 158 | 109 |
| (Georgia (country)) Kakhi Makharadze | MF | 2011–2015 | 122 | 26 |
| (Serbia) Bojan Miladinović | DF | 2009–2014 | 97 | 13 |
| (Turkmenistan) Goçguly Goçgulyýew | DF | 2002–2005 | 80 | 26 |
| (Nigeria) Uche Iheruome | FW | 2005–2010 | 71 | 30 |
| (Montenegro) Adnan Orahovac | MF | 2015–2017 | 66 | 6 |
| (Montenegro) Darko Marković | MF | 2008–2011 | 58 | 9 |
| (Montenegro) Marko Simić | DF | 2017–2019 | 48 | 6 |
| (Brazil) Tiago Bezerra | FW | 2017—2018 | 44 | 21 |
| (Iraq) Bashar Resan | MF | 2025– | 39 | 8 |
| (Brazil) Flamarion | FW | 2025– | 32 | 8 |
| (Guinea-Bissau) Esmaël Gonçalves | FW | 2018 | 31 | 16 |
| (Switzerland) Eren Derdiyok | FW | 2020—2021 | 29 | 12 |
| (Turkmenistan) Artur Geworkyan | FW | 2010 | 20 | 2 |
| (Georgia (country)) Irakli Klimiashvili | MF | 2011—2012 | 22 | 2 |
| (Poland) Przemysław Banaszak | FW | 2022—2023 | 21 | 5 |
| (Colombia) Brayan Riascos | FW | 2025 | 21 | 4 |
| (Kyrgyzstan) Asilbek Momunov | MF | 1994 | 21 | 2 |
| (Iraq) Zaid Tahseen | DF | 2026– | 20 | 1 |
| (Ukraine) Konstantin Sosenko | MF | 2000 | 20 | 0 |
| (Belarus) Pavel Pavlyuchenko | GK | 2023—2024 | 18 | 0 |
| (Kazakhstan) Aleksandr Krokhmal | FW | 2003 | 16 | 6 |
| (Kyrgyzstan) Kimi Merk | MF | 2023–2024 | 16 | 3 |
| (Australia) Rostyn Griffiths | MF | 2017—2018 | 16 | 0 |
| (Ukraine) Oleg Zenchenkov | FW | 2000 | 15 | 3 |
| (Lithuania) Virginijus Baltušnikas | MF | 1991 | 15 | 3 |
| (Ukraine) Vladislav Lutiy | DF | 2001 | 15 | 2 |
| (Israel) Gidi Kanyuk | MF | 2017 | 14 | 1 |
| (North Macedonia) Dušhan Savić | MF | 2011 | 13 | 7 |
| (Serbia) Bojan Matić | FW | 2021 | 12 | 2 |
| (Armenia) Zhora Hovhannisyan | DF | 2013—2014 | 12 | 3 |
| (Turkmenistan) Pavel Butenko | GK | 2002-2003 | 12 | 0 |
| (Poland) Piotr Parzyszek | FW | 2026 | 10 | 2 |
| (Brazil) Fabio Pinto | FW | 2008 | 10 | 1 |
| (Bulgaria) Kamen Hadzhiev | DF | 2022 | 10 | 0 |
| (Ukraine) Oleksandr Nasonov | DF | 2022 | 10 | 0 |
| (Montenegro) Oliver Sarkic | FW | 2022 | 9 | 3 |
| (Serbia) Milan Nikolić | DF | 2009 | 9 | 0 |
| (Croatia) Jurica Buljat | DF | 2017 | 9 | 0 |
| (Brazil) Jhonatan | GK | 2025 | 9 | 0 |
| (Brazil) Anderson | MF | 1998 | 8 | 4 |
| (Brazil) Jonatan Lucca | MF | 2025 | 8 | 0 |
| (Ukraine) Oleksiy Larin | DF | 2022 | 8 | 0 |
| (Montenegro) Ilija Martinović | DF | 2022 | 7 | 0 |
| (Netherlands) Matthew Steenvoorden | DF | 2023 | 6 | 0 |
| (Ukraine) Sergey Mayboroda | MF | 2001 | 6 | 0 |
| (Nigeria) Stephen Chinedu | FW | 2026– | 5 | 2 |
| (Serbia) Milorad Janjuš | FW | 2010 | 5 | 1 |
| (Lithuania) Gintaras Kvitkauskas | DF | 1991 | 3 | 0 |
| (Georgia (country)) Giorgi Papava | MF | 2023 | 3 | 0 |
| (Turkmenistan) Maksim Belyh | DF | 2006 | 3 | 0 |
| (Montenegro) Sanibal Orahovac | MF | 2012 | 2 | 1 |
| (Poland) Michał Kucharczyk | FW | 2023 | 2 | 0 |
| (Japan) Naoya Shibamura | DF | 2012 | 1 | 0 |
| (Iraq) Aymen Hussein | FW | 2026– | 1 | 0 |
| (Iran) Morteza Pouraliganji | DF | 2026– | 0 | 0 |
