= Gennadi Denisov =

Uzbekistani footballer (born 1960)

Personal information
- Full name: Gennadi Anatolyevich Denisov
- Date of birth: 20 August 1960 (age 66)
- Place of birth: Sirdaryo, Uzbek SSR, Soviet Union
- Height: 1.82 m (6 ft 0 in)
- Position: Defender

Senior career*
Years	Team	Apps	(Gls)
1977	Pakhtachi Guliston		
1978–1986	Pakhtakor	194	(12)
1986	CSKA Moscow	19	(0)
1987–1991	Pakhtakor	177	(20)
1992–1994	Spartak Vladikavkaz	77	(2)
1995–1997	Navbahor Namangan	41	(0)
1998	Sergeli Tashkent		

International career
1992–1996	Uzbekistan	5	(0)

Managerial career
- 1998–2000: Sergeli Tashkent
- 2001: Kimyogar Chirchiq (assistant)
- 2002: Pakhtakor (reserves)
- 2003: Lokomotiv Tashkent (assistant)
- 2010–2016: Olmaliq FK (assistant)
- * Club domestic league appearances and goals

Gennadi Anatolyevich Denisov (Russian: Геннадий Анатольевич Денисов; born 20 August 1960) is an Uzbekistani professional football coach and a former player. His son Vitaliy Denisov is also a professional footballer.

== Club career ==
Denisov started his playing career at Pakhtachi Guliston from Guliston in 1977. After one year playing for Pakhtachi he joinedPakhtakor. The most of his career he played for Pakhtakor. He made his professional debut in the Soviet Top League in 1979 for Pakhtakor.

He was one of the player of Pakhtakor among Andrey Pyatnitskiy, Mirjalol Qosimov, Igor Shkvyrin, Khoren Oganesian and others who led club to promotion to Soviet Top League in 1991, after finishing runners-up in 1990 Soviet First League. Denisov is all-time most capped player of Pakhtakor with 371 caps ahed of Berador Abduraimov. Totally he capped 508 matches in all championships in his career.

In 1992, he moved to Spartak Vladikavkaz where he completed three seasons. Denisov played two games in the UEFA Cup 1993–94 for Spartak Vladikavkaz. From 1995 to 1997 he played at Navbahor Namangan and won championship in 1996.

== International career ==
Denisov completed five matches for the Uzbekistan national team between 1992 and 1996. In 1996 AFC Asian Cup he played in all three matches of Uzbekistan in group stage.

== Managerial career ==
Denisov started his coaching career in 1998 at Sergeli Tashkent. In 2001, he worked as assistant coach at Kimyogar Chirchiq. From 2010 to 2016 he was an assistant coach to Igor Shkvyrin at Olmaliq FK.

== Honours ==
Pakhtakor

- Soviet First League runner-up: 1990

Spartak Vladikavkaz

- Russian Premier League runner-up: 1992

Navbahor Namangan

- Uzbek League: 1996
- Uzbek Cup: 1995
