= Vitaliy Denisov =

Uzbekistani footballer (born 1987)

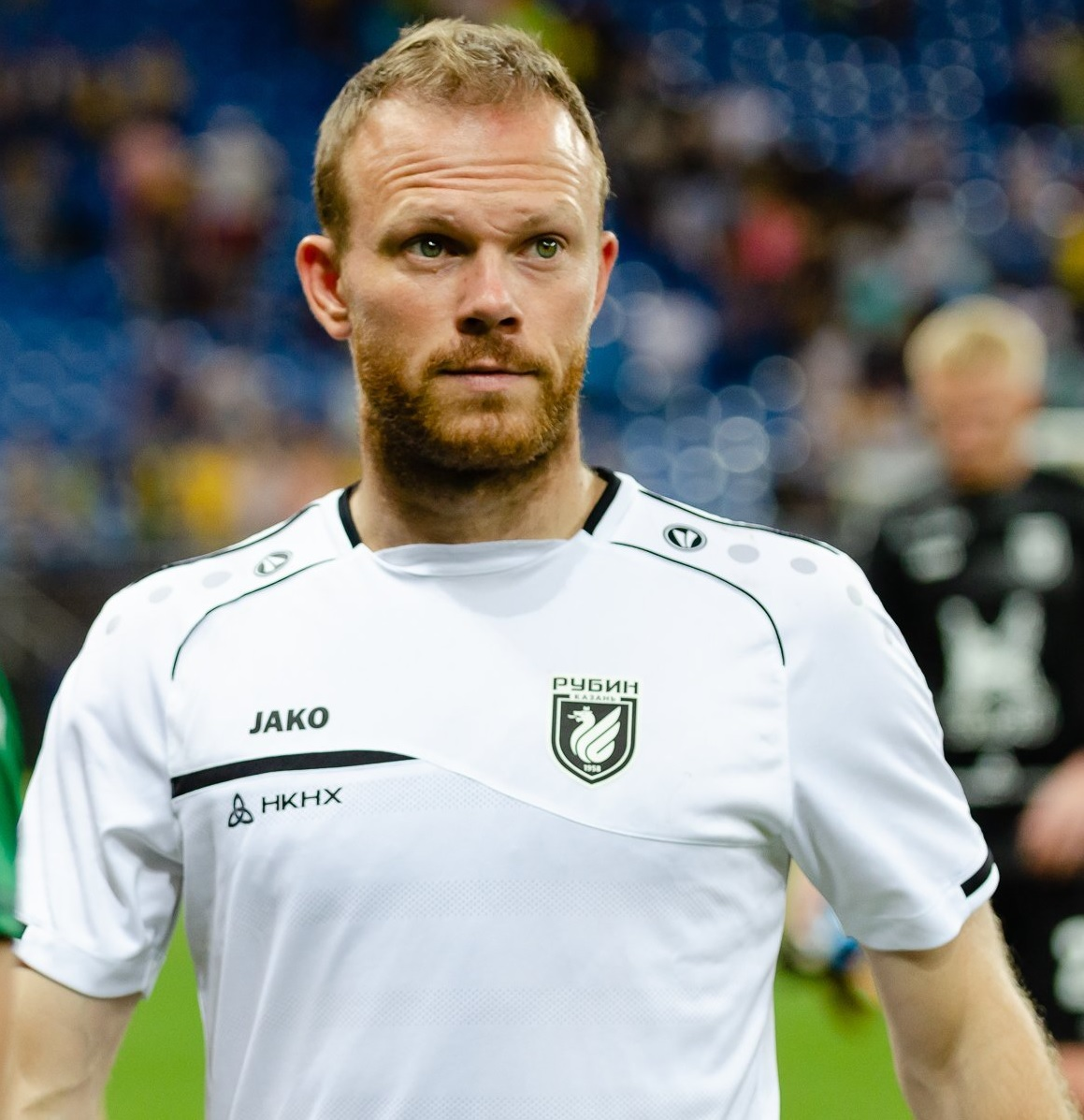
- Denisov with Rubin Kazan in 2019

Personal information
- Full name: Vitaliy Gennadyevich Denisov
- Date of birth: 23 February 1987 (age 39)
- Place of birth: Tashkent, Uzbek SSR, Soviet Union
- Height: 1.78 m (5 ft 10 in)
- Position: Left-back

Team information
- Current team: Bukhara
- Number: 29

Youth career
- Pakhtakor Tashkent
- Sportakademklub Moscow

Senior career*
Years	Team	Apps	(Gls)
2003–2006	CSKA Moscow	0	(0)
2006	→ Spartak Nizhny Novgorod (loan)	36	(1)
2007–2013	Dnipro Dnipropetrovsk	135	(2)
2013–2019	Lokomotiv Moscow	120	(1)
2018–2019	→ Krylia Sovetov Samara (loan)	15	(0)
2019	Rubin Kazan	8	(0)
2020	Rotor Volgograd	2	(0)
2020–2021	Tom Tomsk	23	(0)
2021	Baltika Kaliningrad	9	(0)
2022	Sogdiana Jizzakh	12	(0)
2023–2024	AGMK	13	(0)
2024–	Bukhara	3	(0)

International career^{‡}
2007–2018	Uzbekistan	72	(1)
Medal record
CSKA Moscow
Winner	Russian Cup	2005
Winner	UEFA cup	2005
Lokomotiv Moscow
Winner	Russian Cup	2015
Winner	Russian Cup	2017
Third place	Russian Premier League	2014
- * Club domestic league appearances and goals as of 8 April 2024 ‡ National team caps and goals as of 11 September 2018

Vitaliy Gennadyevich Denisov (Виталий Геннадьевич Денисов; born 23 February 1987) is an Uzbekistani professional footballer who plays as a left-back for Bukhara. He is a former member of the Uzbekistan national team. He is the son of Gennadi Denisov.

== Club career ==
=== CSKA Moscow ===
In 2003, Denisov signed a contract with CSKA Moscow. Although he didn't play in a match, CSKA won the UEFA Cup in 2005, and Denisov became the first Uzbek football player to win a European Cup.

In 2006 he was loaned to Spartak Nizhny Novgorod who were then competing in the Russian First Division.

=== Dnipro Dnipropetrovsk ===
In January 2007, he was transferred to the Ukrainian Premier League side Dnipro Dnipropetrovsk for a fee of €2.5 million. He played there from 2007 into the 2012–13 season, making over 160 appearances.

=== Lokomotiv Moscow ===
On 13 January 2013, Denisov agreed to the terms of a three-year contract with Lokomotiv Moscow on a free transfer. On 5 August 2013, he scored his first goal club for Lokomotiv Moscow on match against Krasnodar. On 26 August 2013, Denisov recorded three assists in a Russian Premier League match in a 5–0 Lokomotiv rout over Rostov

In August 2013 Denisov won monthly contest among Lokomotiv's fans and was named Player of the Month. He won this prize for the second time in the following May. At the end of the 2013–14 season, Denisov was named the best left-back in the Russian Premier League by the Executive Committee of the Russian Football Union.

On 23 December 2013, Denisov was named Uzbekistan Player of the Year.

=== Krylia Sovetov Samara ===
On 21 August 2018, he joined PFC Krylia Sovetov Samara on loan until the end of 2018.

=== Rubin Kazan ===
On 20 June 2019, he signed a one-season contract with Rubin Kazan. On 11 January 2020, his Rubin contract was terminated by mutual consent.

=== FNL clubs ===
On 16 January 2020, he joined Russian Football National League club Rotor Volgograd. He left Rotor on 18 June 2020.

On 20 September 2020, he signed a one-season contract with Tom Tomsk.

On 8 June 2021, he moved to Baltika Kaliningrad. His contract with Baltika was terminated by mutual consent on 1 December 2021.

== International career ==
Denisov made his debut for the Uzbekistan national team on 22 February 2006 in an AFC Asian Cup qualification match against Bangladesh, in which Uzbekistan won 5–0.

== Career statistics ==
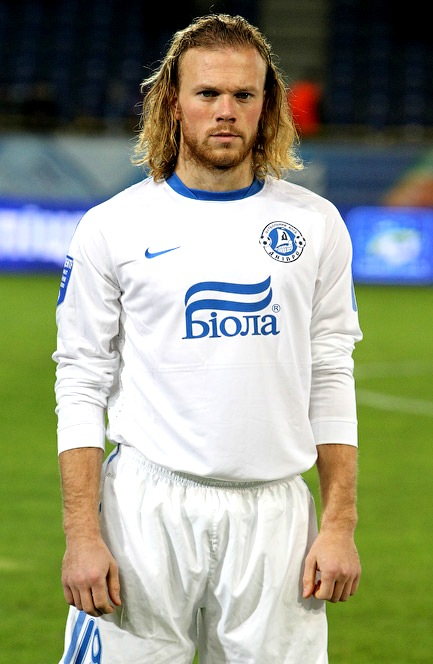
Denisov with Dnipro Dnipropetrovsk in 2011

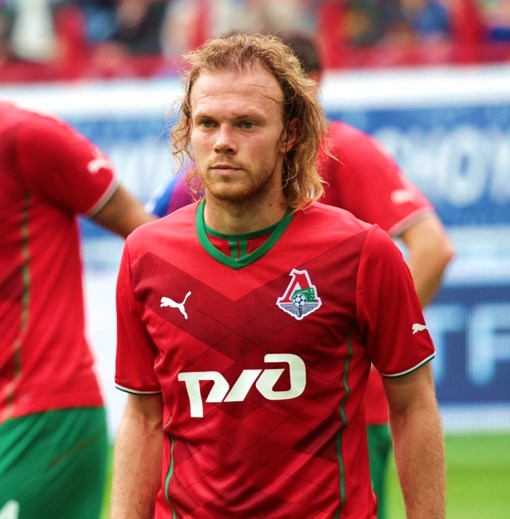
Denisov playing for Lokomotiv Moscow in 2013

=== Club ===
As of 13 May 2018

Appearances and goals by club, season and competition
Club	Season	League			Cup		Continental		Other		Total	
Club	Season	Division	Apps	Goals	Apps	Goals	Apps	Goals	Apps	Goals	Apps	Goals
CSKA Moscow	2003	Russian Premier League	0	0	0	0	0	0	–		0	0
CSKA Moscow	2004	Russian Premier League	0	0	1	0	0	0	–		1	0
CSKA Moscow	2005	Russian Premier League	0	0	1	0	0	0	–		1	0
CSKA Moscow	Total		0	0	2	0	0	0	0	0	2	0
Spartak Nizhny Novgorod	2006	FNL	36	1	3	0	–		–		39	1
Dnipro	2006–07	Ukrainian Premier League	12	0	–		–		–		12	0
Dnipro	2007–08	Ukrainian Premier League	24	0	1	0	4	0	–		29	0
Dnipro	2008–09	Ukrainian Premier League	22	1	2	0	0	0	–		24	1
Dnipro	2009–10	Ukrainian Premier League	28	0	2	0	–		–		30	0
Dnipro	2010–11	Ukrainian Premier League	23	0	4	0	4	0	="2"|–		31	0
Dnipro	2011–12	Ukrainian Premier League	16	0	2	0	2	0	–		20	0
Dnipro	2012–13	Ukrainian Premier League	10	1	2	0	5	0	–		17	1
Dnipro	Total		135	2	13	0	15	0	0	0	163	2
Lokomotiv Moscow	2012–13	Russian Premier League	8	0	–		–		–		8	0
Lokomotiv Moscow	2013–14	Russian Premier League	24	1	1	0	–		–		25	1
Lokomotiv Moscow	2014–15	Russian Premier League	26	0	4	0	1	0	–		31	0
Lokomotiv Moscow	2015–16	Russian Premier League	29	0	1	0	7	0	1 (Note: One appearance in the 2015 Russian Super Cup)	0	38	0
Lokomotiv Moscow	2016–17	Russian Premier League	24	0	4	0	–		–		28	0
Lokomotiv Moscow	2017–18	Russian Premier League	9	0	0	0	2	0	–		11	0
Lokomotiv Moscow	Total		120	1	10	0	10	0	1	0	141	1
Career total			291	4	26	0	25	0	1	0	343	4

=== International ===
Goals for Senior National Team

#	Date	Venue	Opponent	Score	Result	Competition
1	2 June 2008	Singapore, Singapore	Singapore	7–3	Won	2010 FIFA World Cup Qualification

== Honours ==
CSKA Moscow

- UEFA cup: 2004–05
- Russian Cup: 2004–05

Lokomotiv Moscow

- Russian Premier League: 2017–18
- Russian Cup: 2014–15, 2016–17

Individual

- Uzbekistan Player of the Year: 2013
- Best left-back in the Russian Football Premier League: 2013–2014
