= Nikolai Borisovich Kulikov =

Soviet footballer

Nikolai Borisovich Kulikov (Russian: Куликов, Николай Борисович; April 25, 1953 in Moscow, USSR – August 11, 1979 in Dniprodzerzhynsk, Ukraine SSR) was a Soviet footballer. Kulikov played for Pakhtakor Tashkent as a defender from 1976 to 1979. He was one of the 17 Pakhtakor members killed in the August 1979 Dniprodzerzhynsk mid-air collision. He was classified as a Master of Sport of the USSR in 1979.

== Early life and career ==
A product of Dynamo Moscow's youth football system; Kulikov's first coaches were the famous Soviet football players Vladimir Kesarev and Sergey Solovyov. In 1974 Nikolai Kulikov, a young half back, was invited to FC Khanki (Khorezm, Uzbek SSR) where he played for two seasons. In 1976 Nikolai Kulikov successfully played for FK Yangiyer (Yangier, Uzbek SSR) and was recruited by Pakhtakor Tashkent of Tashkent, Uzbek SSR. In 1977 Pakhtakor Tashkent was promoted from the Soviet First League to the Soviet Top League. Nikolai Kulikov invaluably contributed to FC Pakhtakor success with twenty-one matches in defence and one goal. He was highly praised for high mobility, good play thinking, and reciprocity and sincere friendship with teammates.

== Death ==
At 26, Kulikov and sixteen other Pakhtakor Tashkent players and staff died in a mid-air collision over Kurilovka (Dneprodzerzhinsk, Ukrainian SSR). Buried in his patrimony Krivskoye (near Obninsk, Borovskiy District, Kaluga Oblast, Russia).
