= Olimjon Ashirov =

Soviet footballer

Personal information
- Full name: Olimjon Masalievich Ashirov
- Date of birth: 25 January 1955
- Place of birth: Tashkent, Uzbek SSR
- Date of death: 11 August 1979 (aged 24)
- Place of death: Dniprodzerzhynsk, USSR
- Position: Defender

Senior career*
Years	Team	Apps	(Gls)
1972–1979	Pakhtakor Tashkent	149	(5)
- * Club domestic league appearances and goals as of 24 July 2008

Olimjon Masaliyevich Ashirov (Uzbek: Олимжон Масалиевич Аширов, Russian: Алим Масалиевич Аширов, Alim Ashirov; 25 January 1955 in Tashkent – 11 August 1979 in Dniprodzerzhynsk, Ukraine SSR) was a Soviet footballer. Ashirov played for Pakhtakor Tashkent as a defender from 1972 to 1979. He was one of the FC Pakhtakor Tashkent members killed in the Dniprodzerzhynsk mid-air collision in August 1979. He was classified as a Master of Sport of the USSR in 1979.
