= Vladimir Makarov =

Soviet footballer (1947–1979)

Vladimir Makarov (footballer)
Personal information
- Full name: Vladimir Vasilevich Makarov
- Date of birth: 9 March 1947
- Place of birth: Stalinabad, Tajik SSR, USSR
- Date of death: 11 August 1979 (aged 32)
- Place of death: Dniprodzerzhynsk, Ukrainian SSR, USSR
- Height: 1.72 m (5 ft 8 in)
- Position: Forward

Senior career*
Years	Team	Apps	(Gls)
1969	Energetik Dushanbe	38	(10)
1970–1973	Pamir Dushanbe	144	(27)
1974–1976	FC Chornomorets Odesa	68	(20)
1977	Pamir Dushanbe	37	(13)
1978–1979	Pakhtakor Tashkent	42	(6)
- * Club domestic league appearances and goals

Vladimir Vasilevich Makarov (Russian: Владимир Васильевич Макаров; 9 March 1947 – 11 August 1979) was a Soviet footballer.

== Club career ==
Makarov played for clubs in Tajikistan and Ukraine from 1969 to 1977. For the last two years of his life, he starred at Pakhtakor Tashkent as a forward in 1978 and 1979. Makarov and sixteen other Pakhtakor Tashkent players and staff were killed in the August 1979 Dniprodzerzhynsk mid-air collision. He was classified as a Master of Sport of the USSR in 1969.
