= Mikhail An =

Korean Soviet footballer (1952–1979)

Personal information
- Full name: Mikhail Ivanovich An
- Date of birth: 19 February 1952
- Place of birth: Orta Chirchiq District, Tashkent Region, Uzbek SSR, USSR
- Date of death: August 11, 1979 (aged 27)
- Place of death: Dniprodzerzhynsk, Dnipropetrovsk Oblast, Ukrainian SSR, USSR
- Height: 1.78 m (5 ft 10 in)
- Position: Midfielder

Senior career*
Years	Team	Apps	(Gls)
1968–1969	Politotdel		
1970–1979	Pakhtakor	233	(50)

International career
1978	USSR	2	(0)
- * Club domestic league appearances and goals

Mikhail Ivanovich An (Russian: Михаил Иванович Ан; February 19, 1952 – August 11, 1979) was a Soviet football player of Korean ethnic origin. An was one of the FC Pakhtakor Tashkent players killed in the 1979 Dniprodzerzhynsk mid-air collision.

In 2020, a documentary, titled Misha, was made about him by Brian Song.

== International career ==
An made his debut for the USSR national team on September 6, 1978 in a friendly against Iran and also played in a UEFA Euro 1980 qualifier against Greece.
