= Berador Abduraimov =

Soviet footballer and manager

Personal information
- Full name: Berador Khasanovich Abduraimov
- Date of birth: May 14, 1943 (age 83)
- Place of birth: Tashkent, UzSSR, USSR
- Position: Striker

Senior career*
Years	Team	Apps	(Gls)
1960–1964	Pakhtakor Tashkent	85	(20)
1964	Spartak Moscow	1	(0)
1964–1968	Pakhtakor Tashkent	152	(50)
1969–1970	CSKA Moscow	38	(8)
1970–1974	Pakhtakor Tashkent	122	(61)
1976	Meliorator Yangiyer	??	(11)

Managerial career
- 1987–1988: Pakhtakor Tashkent
- 1989: Spartak Andjian
- 1991: Umid Tashkent
- 1992: Navbahor Namangan
- 1993: MHSK Tashkent
- 1994: Uzbekistan
- 1995 Jan-Mai: Navbahor Namangan
- 1998: Qizilqum Zarafshon
- 1999: Surkhon Termez
- 2002: FC Uzbekistan
- 2003 June – Sept: Dynamo Samarkand
- * Club domestic league appearances and goals

Berador Khasanovich Abduraimov (Russian: Берадор Хасанович Абдураимов) (born May 14, 1943) is a Soviet former football player, who played for Pakhtakor for most of his football career as a striker. He is regarded as one of the best strikers and greatest football players in the history of Uzbek football.

== Playing career ==
He started his football career in the Uzbekistan Youth football team in 1959. In the same year he began to play for the main squad of Pakhtakor in the Soviet Top League. In 1962, when he was only 19, Abduraimov became the Soviet Top League top goalscorer with 22 goals and Pakhtakor finished the season in the Soviet Top League at 6th place. In the same year he became Merited Master of Sport.

He also played for Spartak Moscow, CSKA Moscow and Meliorator Yangiyer. Abduraimov is a member of Grigory Fedotov club with 106 scored goals. In 2001 at the initiative of the Uzbekistan Football Federation and the football magazine Nash Futbol, an Uzbek goalscorers club was founded and named after him – the Club 200 of Berador Abduraimov. In all, he scored 221 goals in his career. With 358 matches for Pakhtakor he is the club's 2nd most capped player. He scored a total of 131 goals for Pakhtakor and is the 2nd best goalscorer of Pakhtakor after Gennadi Krasnitsky with 202 goals.

His son Azamat Abduraimov was also a football player, playing as a forward.

== International ==
In 1961 he debuted for the Soviet youth football team and scored in a match against Romania.

== Managing career ==
He started his coaching career as manager of Pakhtakor Sports school of youth players. He worked as trainer of Pakhtakor in 1987. As the coach of the Uzbekistan, he won the Asian Games 1994 in Japan.

== Personal life ==
Berador is the grandfather of Alia Azamat Ashkenazi, an American screenwriter and director who co-wrote a soccer documentary "Misha" directed by Brian Song in which Berador was featured as one of the characters. Berador is also the grandfather of Nigina Abduraimova, the top active Uzbek tennis player.

== Honours ==
=== Club ===
Pakhtakor

- Soviet Top League 6th: 1962

=== Individual ===
- Soviet Top League Topscorer: 1968, 22 goals
- Soviet First League Topscorer: 1972, 34 goals
- Club 200 of Berador Abduraimov member: 221 goals
- Grigory Fedotov club member: 106 goals

=== Manager ===
- Asian Games champion: 1994
