= Khoren Oganesian =

Armenian footballer (born 1955)

Personal information
- Date of birth: 10 January 1955 (age 71)
- Place of birth: Yerevan, Armenian SSR, Soviet Union
- Height: 1.71 m (5 ft 7 in)
- Position: Midfielder

Senior career*
Years	Team	Apps	(Gls)
1974–1985	Ararat Yerevan	295	(93)
1986–1988	Arabkir Yerevan	13	(4)
1989–1991	Pakhtakor Tashkent	46	(9)
1992–1993	Kilikia Yerevan	33	(22)
1995–1996	Pyunik Yerevan	4	(0)
Total		391	(128)

International career
1979–1984	Soviet Union	34	(6)

Managerial career
- 1991: Tavriya Simferopol
- 1992–1993: Homenetmen
- 1993–1995: Homenetmen Beirut
- 1995–1998: Kilikia Yerevan
- 1996–1997: Armenia national team
- 2000–2006: Pyunik Yerevan (president)
- 2012–2012: Lokomotiv Tashkent
Medal record
Representing Soviet Union
Men's Football
Bronze medal – third place	1980 Moscow	Team competition
- * Club domestic league appearances and goals

Khoren Oganesian (Armenian: Խորեն Հովհաննիսյան; born 10 January 1955), also known as Khoren Hovhannisyan, is an Armenian former football player and manager. He was awarded the Master of Sport of the USSR, International Class title in 1976.

A midfielder, Oganesian was a member of the Soviet Union national team and mostly played at club level for Soviet Top League and Armenian Premier League club Ararat Yerevan. He is widely considered a legend of Ararat and Armenian football in general. In official games of the USSR championships, Oganesian had 295 matches and scored 93 goals for Ararat. His number of scored goals is a record of the USSR in Armenian football. In November 2003, to celebrate UEFA's Jubilee, he was selected as the Golden Player of Armenia by the Football Federation of Armenia as the nation's most outstanding player of the past 50 years.

In a survey taken in 2005 by the Football Federation of Armenia, Oganesian was chosen as the best player of Armenia in the 20th century. On 28 May 2010, on the occasion of the Armenian Republic Day, a number of prominent figures of different areas were honored. For his contribution to the Fatherland Order of the President of Armenia Serzh Sargsyan, the law on State Awards, the highest award of the country, were given to Oganesian, who was awarded the Khorenatsi medal.

== Early life ==
Khoren Oganesian was born in an Armenian family on 10 January 1955 in Yerevan, Armenian SSR in a family of sportsmen. His father was a weightlifter, and later an honored coach of the Armenian SSR. His mother specialized in gymnastics. Khoren's older brother played football and his younger brother became a weightlifter and later received the Master of Sport of the USSR title.

== Club career ==
Oganesian grew up playing football in a nearby yard with his older brother. In 1969, he joined the team of Ani Yerevan and won the All-Union neighborhood teams tournament Leather Ball and scored one of the goals in the final meeting. Oganesian later engaged in a sports school, after which he entered the Armenian State University of Economics, specializing in state planning. At that time, he was invited to try out for the youth football teams in Armenia, where he was noticed by the head coach of the Soviet Union national under-21 football team, Yevgeny Lyadin. Lyadin wrote a letter of recommendation to the leadership of the local club Ararat Yerevan, where Oganesian was taken into in 1973. He played as a second for two years.

His debut match in Ararat took place on 19 March 1975 in the quarterfinals of the 1974–75 European Cup against Bayern Munich. The match ended in a 1–0 victory for Ararat Yerevan. He debuted in the Soviet Top League national championship a month later on 16 April in Yerevan. In a match of Ararat Yerevan vs. Dnipro Dnipropetrovsk, Oganesian came in at the 75th minute of the match, replacing Sergei Bondarenko. The match ended in 3–0 victory.

Oganesian was scoring a lot from the first matches of the Top League. He had the ability to hit accurately with his left leg, was a skilled organizer, and had precise percussive attacks. Ararat Yerevan won the Soviet Cup in 1975. In the following year, the club made it to the finals of the 1976 Soviet Top League in the spring, where Ararat Yerevan lost to Dynamo Moscow. At the end of 1975, Oganesian was in the national list of award winners as the best newcomer of the Top League season, chosen and awarded by the All-Union Soviet sport magazine Smena.

In February 1984, Oganesian scored his one hundredth goal, which made him a member of the Grigory Fedotov club. He scored with his heel in a match against CSKA Moscow in 1983 in Moscow and scored, the ball flying through the goal net, in a match against Neftchi in 1981, in Yerevan.

Oganesian became the captain of Ararat Yerevan in the early 1980s.

In 1985, due to disagreements with the management of Ararat, he left the club. Oganesian almost didn't play for almost two years because he was unofficially disqualified for alleged match-fixing, though that was never proven.

In 1987, he agreed to play for the factory team Arabkir Yerevan, which became a champion of the republic. In 1988, it appeared already in the Soviet First League.

He took part in the farewell match of Oleg Blokhin, the all-time Soviet top goalscorer, in 1989.

In December 1989, he received an offer from the head coach of Pakhtakor Tashkent, Fyodor Novikov. He helped the Uzbek football club get to the big leagues. In 1991, in a match against Dynamo Kyiv, Oganesian tore his Achilles tendon and was out for the season. He left Pakhtakor that year and began to take up managing. He did not retire as a player, however.

The following year, Oganesian returned to his homeland and joined Armenian club Kilikia Yerevan. While he played for Kilikia, the club won the first ever Armenian Premier League in 1992. Oganesian transferred to Pyunik Yerevan in 1995. While he played for the club, Pyunik won the Armenian Premier League in 1995–96 and won the Armenian Cup in 1996. Oganesian retired as a player after the 1996 season.

At the end of his club career, Oganesian had played a total of 391 matches and scored a total of 122 goals. He played 305 matches and scored 93 goals in the Soviet Top League seasons. He was listed on the 33 best players of the season five times, thrice as the best. Oganesian won 38 international caps for the USSR.

Football Federation of Armenia President Ruben Hayrapetyan said of Oganesian, "There has been a lot of talent in our football, but I saw Oganesian on the pitch and this led to me becoming a football fan. His contribution to the past, present and future of Armenian football could not be overstated."

== International career ==
In 1975, Oganesian joined the Soviet Union under-21 national team, coached by Valentin Nikolayev. He was a part of the Soviet youth team when it won the UEFA Euro 1976 U-21.

Oganesian's skill were noticed by the coaches of the Soviet Union national team, which he started playing for in 1979, when the team was managed by Konstantin Beskov. The following year, as part of the Soviet Union Olympic football team, the USSR squad won bronze at the 1980 Summer Olympics in Moscow. Oganesian scored twice at the Olympics. His first goal was in a dominant 4–0 victory over Venezuela in the group stage. The Soviet team advanced to the semifinals, where they were defeated 1–0 by East Germany. Oganesian did not play because of a concussion received in the quarterfinals. In the following bronze medal match against Yugoslavia, Oganesian came off the bench and scored his second goal and the winning goal at the 67th minute. Sergey Andreyev also scored a goal, leaving the final score 2–0 for the Soviet Union.

The Soviet national team participated in the 1982 FIFA World Cup. Oganesian became the first Armenian player to take part in the World Cup. Oganesian scored one goal in the second group stage against Belgium. The goal proved to be decisive, as the final score was 1–0. Though the USSR tied with Poland 0–0, the Polish team advanced to the knockout stage instead due to total goal difference, as they had defeated the Belgians 3–0 with a hat-trick from Zbigniew Boniek. Oganesian concluded playing for the national team of the country in 1984. In his five years on the team, he played 34 matches and scored 6 goals, most of which proved decisive.

== Managerial career ==
While still a player, in 1991 Oganesian managed to get a coach position on Tavriya Simferopol. The head coach at the time was Anatoliy Zayaev, but the whole training process was taken care of by Oganesian.

Since the collapse of the Soviet Union in 1991, Oganesian moved back to Armenia. Here, along with some of his friends who also participated in football, he decided to found a club. This club was named ADCC, meaning (literal English translation) Armenian General Athletic Union. In Armenian, the club name was abbreviated HMNM, or Homenetmen. Oganesian, already a veteran of football, continued his playing career. In the newly formed club's first season, it became the 1992 Armenian Premier League champion, which was the first ever Armenian Premier League, and the finalist of the 1992 Armenian Cup, also the first of its kind.

Later he moved to Lebanon, where he coached the capital Armenian-Lebanese club Homenetmen Beirut. In his first year with the team, they took 5th place in the Lebanese Second Division. In the second year, they took third.

After a short absence, he returned to Armenia, where he led the home team of his birthplace. During a time Oganesian briefly left to coach the Armenia national football team, the club had at that time changed its name from Kilikia Yerevan to Pyunik Yerevan. The following season, Oganesian returned to the Yerevan club. Oganesian, at this time, was a player-coach for the club. With the second return of Hovhannisyan also came some important highlights in the history of the club. During his first season, there had been issued due to an injury of his. In the second season, the team won the 1996–97 Armenian Premier League. The club won the 1996 Armenian Cup that same season for the first time. Oganesian also led the squad to victory in the Armenian Supercup in 1996 and 1998. In August 1998, Oganesian left the club and was replaced by David Ghazaryan.

In mid-December 2011, Oganesian started coaching Lokomotiv Tashkent, which played in the last season in the Uzbek League.

== Personal life ==
Oganesian is married to his wife Julietta. Khoren has a daughter Edita Oganesian and a son, Zhora Hovhannisyan, who is also a football player. Zhora played for Pyunik Yerevan and Pakhtakor Tashkent, both of which his father also played for. Khoren was managing the clubs Pyunik Yerevan and Lokomotiv Tashkent while Zhora was playing for them.

== Career statistics ==
=== International goals ===
#	Date	Venue	Opponent	Score	Result	Competition
1.	15 October 1980	USSR	Iceland	5–0	Win	1982 WC Qual.
2.	15 October 1980	USSR	Iceland	5–0	Win	1982 WC Qual.
3.	4 December 1980	Argentina	Argentina	1–1	Draw	Friendly
4.	14 April 1982	Argentina	Argentina	1–1	Draw	Friendly
5.	1 July 1982	Spain	Belgium	1–0	Win	1982 World Cup
6.	26 July 1983	East Germany	East Germany	3–1	Win	Friendly

== Honours ==
=== Player ===
Ararat Yerevan

- Soviet Top League runner-up: 1976 (spring)
- Soviet Cup: 1975

Homenetmen Yerevan

- Armenian Premier League: 1992, 1995–96
- Armenian Cup: 1996
- Armenian Cup runner-up: 1992

Soviet Union U21

- UEFA Euro: 1976

Soviet Union

- Olympic Games bronze medal: 1980
- Grigory Fedotov club member – 118 goals

Individual

- Best 33 players of the Soviet Top League season: 1980, 1982, 1983; runner-up 1979; third place 1981
- Best newcomer of the Soviet Top League season: 1975
- Most beautiful goal of the season: 1982

=== Manager ===
Homenetmen Yerevan

- Armenian Premier League: 1995–96, 1996–97
- Armenian Cup: 1996
- Armenian Cup runner-up: 1997
- Armenian Supercup: 1996, 1998
- Armenian Supercup runner-up: 1997
