= Uzbekistan Footballer of the Year =

Award

The Uzbekistan Footballer of the Year (Uzbek: Yilning eng yaxshi futbolchisi or Йилнинг энг яхши футболчиси) is a yearly football award presented by the Uzbekistan Football Association to the most outstanding Uzbekistan footballer among who has been considered to have performed the best in national team or over Uzbekistan Super League and other national championship season. The award is given out at the end of the calendar year and is decided by the survey among sport journalists and football experts.

== Player of the Year award winners ==
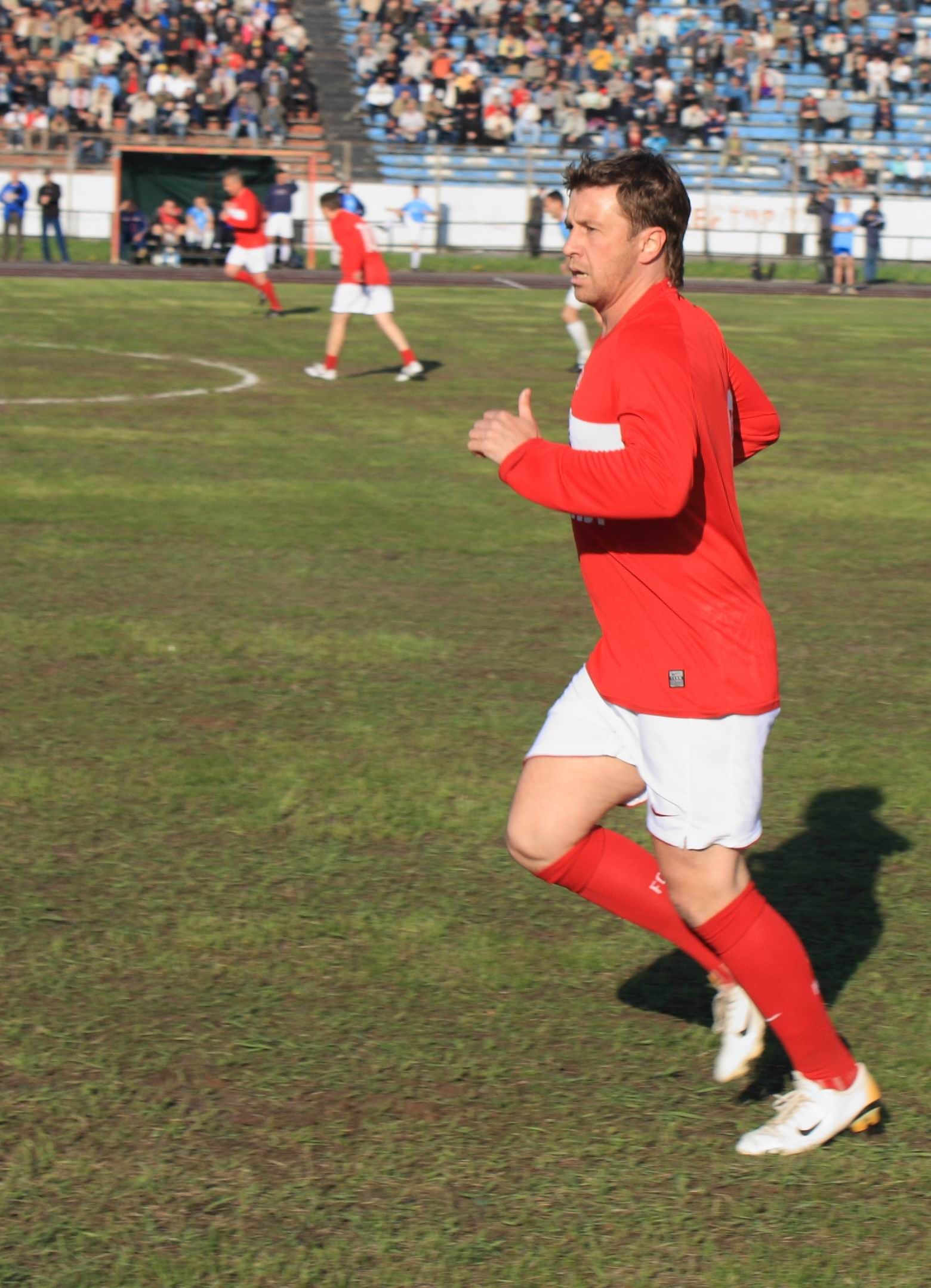
Valery Kechinov, Player of the Year award winner in 1992

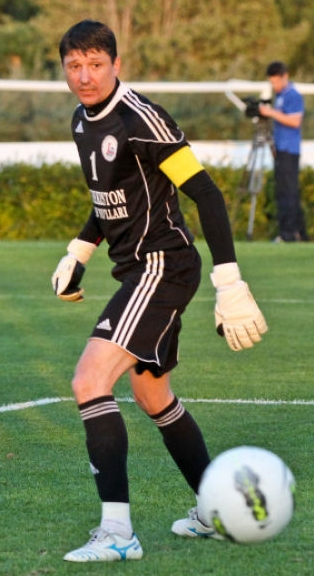
Pavel Bugalo award winner in 1996, 1997

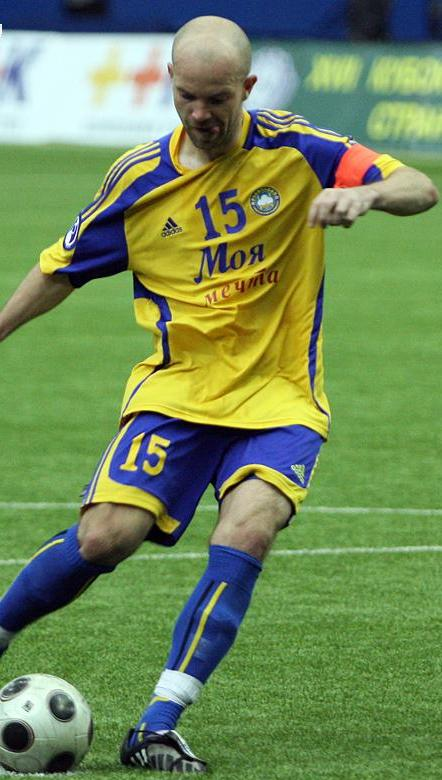
Alexander Geynrikh won the award in 2002

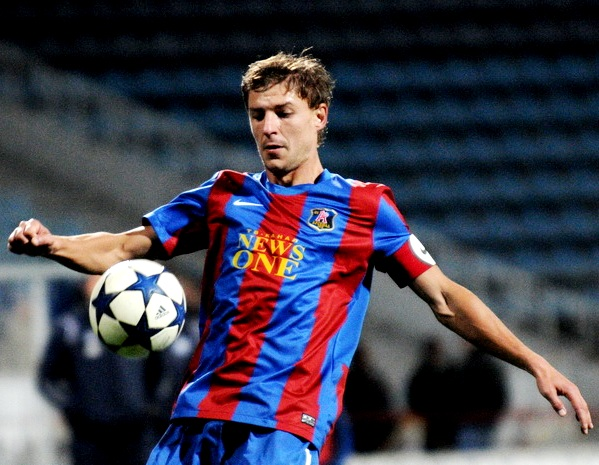
Maksim Shatskikh won the award in 2003, 2005, 2006 and 2007

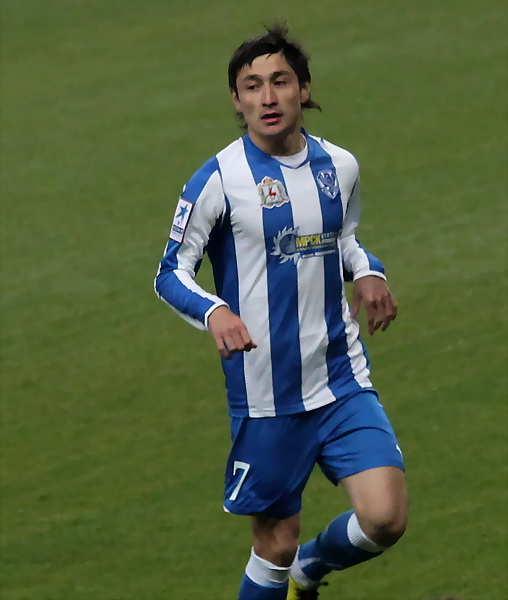
Sanzhar Tursunov won the award in 2012

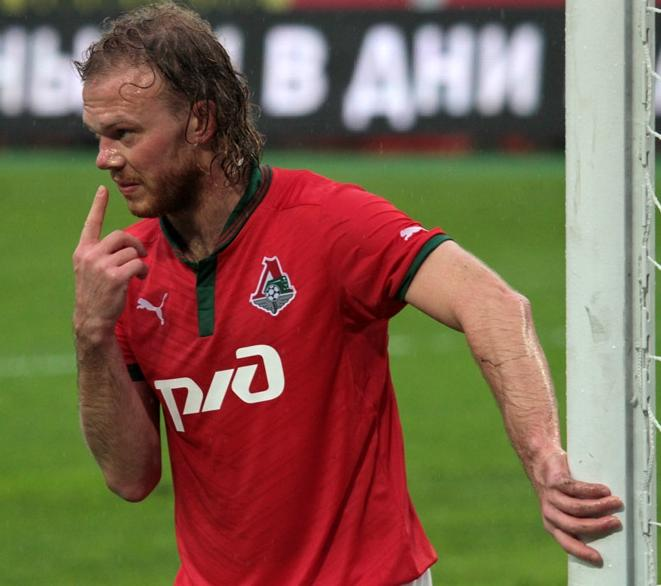
Vitaliy Denisov, Player of the Year winner in 2013

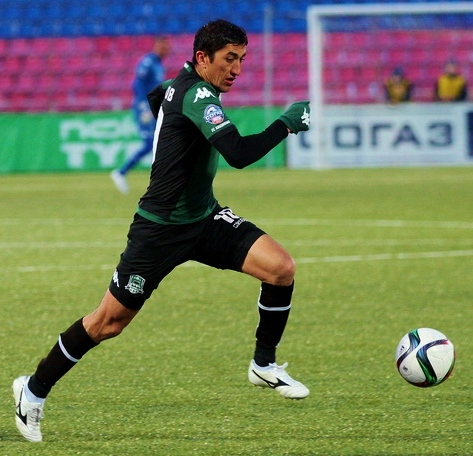
Odil Ahmedov won the award in 2009, 2011, 2014, 2015 and 2016

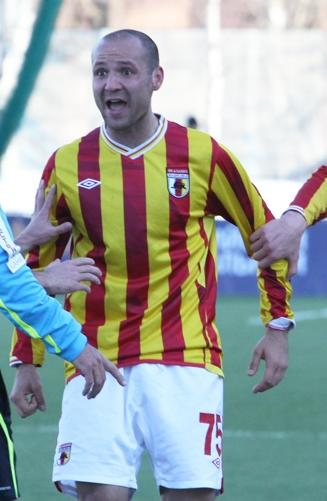
Marat Bikmaev Player of the Year in 2017

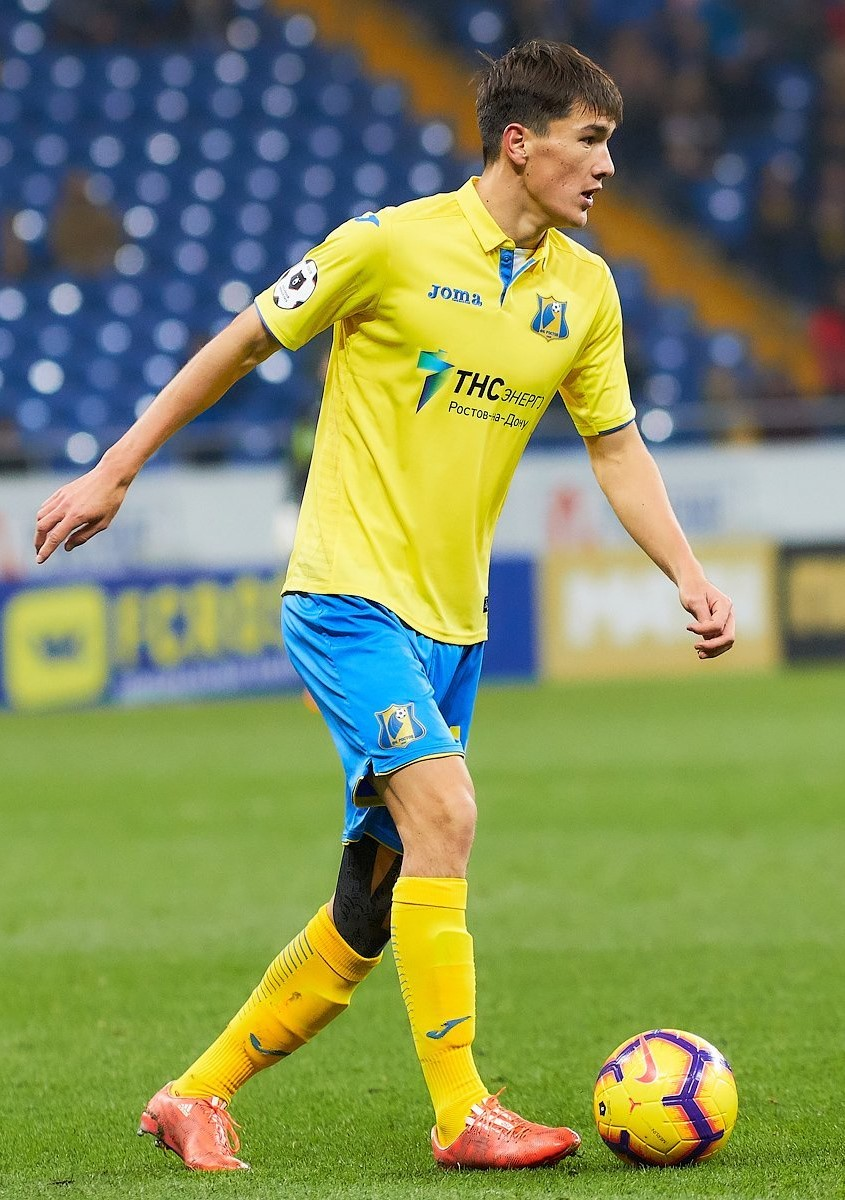
Eldor Shomurodov Player of the Year in 2019, 2021 and 2025

Year	Place	Player	Club	Points
1992	1	Valeriy Kechinov	(Uzbekistan) Pakhtakor	
1992	2	Rustam Abdulloev	(Uzbekistan) Temiryulchi Kokand	
1992	3	Mustafa Belyalov	(Uzbekistan) Nurafshon	
1993	1	Mirjalol Qosimov	(Uzbekistan) Pakhtakor	
1993	2	Rustam Durmonov	(Uzbekistan) Neftchi Fergana	
1993	3	Stepan Atayan	(Uzbekistan) Neftchi Fergana	
1994	1	Igor Shkvyrin	(Israel) Maccabi Haifa	
1994	2	Mirjalol Qosimov	(Uzbekistan) Pakhtakor	
1994	3	Yuriy Sheykin	(Uzbekistan) Traktor Tashkent	
1995	1	Oleg Shatskikh	(Uzbekistan) Navbahor	
1995	2	Dilmurod Nazarov	(Uzbekistan) Pakhtakor	
1995	3	Sergey Lebedev	(Uzbekistan) Neftchi Fergana	
1996	1	Pavel Bugalo	(Uzbekistan) Pakhtakor	
1996	2	Farkhad Magametov	(Uzbekistan) Navbahor Namangan	
1996	3	Sergey Lebedev	(Uzbekistan) Neftchi Fergana	
1997	1	Pavel Bugalo	(Uzbekistan) Pakhtakor	
1997	2	Jafar Irismetov	(Uzbekistan) Dustlik	
1997	3	Andrei Fyodorov	(Uzbekistan) Neftchi Fergana	
1998	1	Mirjalol Qosimov	(Uzbekistan) Pakhtakor	
1998	2	Igor Shkvyrin	(Uzbekistan) Pakhtakor	
1998	3	Andrey Akopyants	(Uzbekistan) Pakhtakor	
1999	1	Andrey Akopyants	(Uzbekistan) Pakhtakor	
1999	2	Shuhrat Rahmonqulov	(Uzbekistan) Navbahor Namangan	
1999	3	Numon Khasanov	(Uzbekistan) Dustlik	
2000	1	Jafar Irismetov	(Uzbekistan) Dustlik	
2000	2	Zafar Kholmurodov	(Uzbekistan) Nasaf Qarshi	
2000	3	Mukhsin Mukhamadiev	(Uzbekistan) Samarqand Dinamo	
2001	1	Mirjalol Qosimov	(Russia) Krylia Sovetov Samara	
2001	2	Nikolay Shirshov	(Russia) Rostov	
2001	3	Umid Isoqov	(Uzbekistan) Neftchi Fergana	
2002	1	Alexander Geynrikh	(Uzbekistan) Pakhtakor	
2002	2	Gocguly Gocgulyev	(Uzbekistan) Pakhtakor	
2002	3	Server Djeparov	(Uzbekistan) Pakhtakor	
2003	1	Maksim Shatskikh	(Ukraine) Dynamo Kyiv	
2003	2	Vladimir Shishelov	(Moldova) Zimbru Kishinyov	
2003	3	Alexander Geynrikh	(Russia) CSKA Moscow	
2004	1	Mirjalol Qosimov	(Russia) Alania Vladikavkaz	
2004	2	Alexander Geynrikh	(Russia) CSKA Moscow	
2004	3	Maksim Shatskikh	(Ukraine) Dynamo Kyiv	
2005	1	Maksim Shatskikh	(Ukraine) Dinamo Kyiv	373
2005	2	Mirjalol Qosimov	(Uzbekistan) Mash'al Mubarek	304
2005	3	Anvar Soliev	(Uzbekistan) Pakhtakor	261
2006	1	Maksim Shatskikh	(Ukraine) Dinamo Kyiv	426
2006	2	Alexander Geynrikh	(Russia) Torpedo Moscow	421
2006	3	Server Djeparov	(Uzbekistan) Pakhtakor	287
2007	1	Maksim Shatskikh	(Ukraine) Dinamo Kyiv	286
2007	2	Server Djeparov	(Uzbekistan) Pakhtakor	105
2007	3	Vitaliy Denisov	(Ukraine) Dnipro Dnipropetrovsk	100
2008	1	Server Djeparov	(Uzbekistan) Bunyodkor	138
2008	2	Odil Ahmedov	(Uzbekistan) Pakhtakor	133
2008	3	Ignatiy Nesterov	(Uzbekistan) Pakhtakor	84
2009	1	Odil Ahmedov	(Uzbekistan) Pakhtakor	329
2009	2	Rivaldo	(Uzbekistan) Bunyodkor	293
2009	3	Jasur Hasanov	(Uzbekistan) Bunyodkor	86
2010	1	Server Djeparov	(Uzbekistan) Bunyodkor	95
2010	2	Odil Ahmedov	(Uzbekistan) Pakhtakor	94
2010	3	Bahodir Nasimov	(Azerbaijan) Neftchi Baku	37
2011	1	Odil Ahmedov	(Russia) Anzhi Makhachkala	257
2011	2	Server Djeparov	(Saudi Arabia) Al-Shabab	137
2011	3	Alexander Geynrikh	(South Korea) Suwon Bluewings	116
2012	1	Sanzhar Tursunov	(Russia) Alania Vladikavkaz	321
2012	2	Odil Ahmedov	(Russia) Anzhi Makhachkala	241
2012	3	Ulugbek Bakayev	(Kazakhstan) Irtysh Pavlodar	162
2013	1	Vitaliy Denisov	(Russia) Lokomotiv Moscow	147
2013	2	Jamshid Iskanderov	(Uzbekistan) Pakhtakor	56
2013	3	Odil Ahmedov	(Russia) Anzhi Makhachkala	44
2014	1	Odil Ahmedov	(Russia) Krasnodar	239
2014	2	Vitaliy Denisov	(Russia) Lokomotiv Moscow	194
2014	3	Jamshid Iskanderov	(Uzbekistan) Pakhtakor	155
2015	1	Odil Ahmedov	(Russia) Krasnodar	50
2015	2	Sardor Rashidov	(Qatar) El Jaish	32
2015	3	Igor Sergeev	(Uzbekistan) Pakhtakor	21
2016	1	Odil Ahmedov	(China) Shanghai SIPG	33
2016	2	Temurkhuja Abdukholiqov	(Qatar) Al-Sailiya	22
2016	3	Vitaliy Denisov	(Russia) Lokomotiv Moscow	16
2017	1	Marat Bikmaev	(Uzbekistan) Lokomotiv	
2017	2-3	Bakhrom Abdurakhimov	(Uzbekistan) Nasaf	
2017	2-3	Otabek Shukurov	(Uzbekistan) Bunyodkor	
2018	1	Odil Ahmedov	(China) Shanghai SIPG	
2018	2	Marat Bikmaev	(Uzbekistan) Lokomotiv	
2018	3	Otabek Shukurov	(United Arab Emirates) Sharjah	
2018	3	Ikromjon Alibaev	(Uzbekistan) Lokomotiv	
2019	1	Eldor Shomurodov	(Russia) Rostov	
2019	2	Odil Ahmedov	(China) Shanghai SIPG	
2019	3	Jaloliddin Masharipov	(Uzbekistan) Pakhtakor	
2020	1	Jaloliddin Masharipov	(Uzbekistan) Pakhtakor	119
2020	2	Eldor Shomurodov	(Italy) Genoa	103
2020	3	Oybek Bozorov	(Uzbekistan) Nasaf	50
2021	1	Eldor Shomurodov	(Italy) Roma	111
2021	2	Jaloliddin Masharipov	(Saudi Arabia) Al Nassr	106
2021	3	Khusayin Norchaev	(Uzbekistan) Nasaf	61
2022	1	Jamshid Iskanderov	(Uzbekistan) Navbahor	142
2022	2	Bobur Abdikholikov	(Belarus) Energetik-BGU	90
2022	3	Eldor Shomurodov	(Italy) Roma	89
2023	1	Abbosbek Fayzullaev	(Russia) CSKA Moscow	128
2023	2	Oston Urunov	(Uzbekistan) Navbahor	125
2023	3	Abdukodir Khusanov	(France) Lens	26
2024	1	Abbosbek Fayzullaev	(Russia) CSKA Moscow	138
2024	2	Abdukodir Khusanov	(France) Lens	137
2024	3	Utkir Yusupov	(Iran) Foolad	29
2025	1	Eldor Shomurodov	(Turkey) İstanbul Başakşehir	138

== By player ==
Player	Total	Years
Odil Ahmedov	6	2009, 2011, 2014, 2015, 2016, 2018
Mirjalol Qosimov	4	1993, 1998, 2001, 2004
Maksim Shatskikh	4	2003, 2005, 2006, 2007
Eldor Shomurodov	3	2019, 2021, 2025
Pavel Bugalo	2	1996, 1997
Server Djeparov	2	2008, 2010
Abbosbek Fayzullaev	2	2023, 2024
Valeriy Kechinov	1	1992
Igor Shkvyrin	1	1994
Oleg Shatskikh	1	1995
Andrey Akopyants	1	1999
Jafar Irismetov	1	2000
Alexander Geynrikh	1	2002
Vitaliy Denisov	1	2013
Marat Bikmaev	1	2017
Jaloliddin Masharipov	1	2020
Jamshid Iskanderov	1	2022

=== By club ===
Club	Players	Total	Years
(Uzbekistan) Pakhtakor	7	9	1992, 1993, 1996, 1997, 1998, 1999, 2002, 2009, 2020
(Ukraine) Dynamo Kyiv	1	4	2003, 2005, 2006, 2007
(Russia) CSKA Moscow	1	2	2023, 2024
(Russia) Krasnodar	1	2	2014, 2015
(China) Shanghai SIPG	1	2	2016, 2018
(Uzbekistan) Bunyodkor	1	2	2008, 2010
(Russia) Alania Vladikavkaz	2	2	2004, 2012
(Uzbekistan) Navbahor	2	2	1995, 2022
(Uzbekistan) Dustlik	1	1	2000
(Israel) Maccabi Haifa	1	1	1994
(Russia) Krylia Sovetov Samara	1	1	2001
(Russia) Anzhi Makhachkala	1	1	2011
(Russia) Lokomotiv Moscow	1	1	2013
(Uzbekistan) Lokomotiv	1	1	2017
(Russia) Rostov	1	1	2019
(Italy) Roma	1	1	2021
(Turkey) İstanbul Başakşehir	1	1	2025

== See also ==
- Uzbekistan Football Coach of the Year
