= Aleksandr Ivankov =

Russian football player

Personal information
- Full name: Aleksandr Alekseyevich Ivankov
- Date of birth: 12 January 2000 (age 26)
- Place of birth: Saint Petersburg, Russia
- Height: 1.85 m (6 ft 1 in)
- Position: Centre-back

Team information
- Current team: FC Torpedo Moscow
- Number: 3

Youth career
- –2015: FC Zenit Saint Petersburg
- 2015–2017: FC Dynamo Moscow
- 2018: FC Zorky Krasnogorsk
- 2020: FC Rubin Kazan

Senior career*
| Years | Team | Apps | (Gls) |
| 2019 | FC Zorky Krasnogorsk | 19 | (2) |
| 2020–2021 | FC Ural-2 Yekaterinburg | 23 | (0) |
| 2021–2022 | FC Metallurg Lipetsk | 25 | (1) |
| 2022–2023 | FC SKA-Khabarovsk | 25 | (2) |
| 2023– | FC Torpedo Moscow | 61 | (4) |

International career
| 2015–2016 | Russia U-16 | 2 | (0) |
| 2016 | Russia U-17 | 1 | (0) |
- * Club domestic league appearances and goals as of 16 May 2026

Aleksandr Alekseyevich Ivankov (Russian: Александр Алексеевич Иваньков; born 12 January 2000) is a Russian football player who plays for FC Torpedo Moscow.

== Club career ==
He made his debut in the Russian Football National League for FC Metallurg Lipetsk on 25 July 2021 in a game against FC Akron Tolyatti.

== Career statistics ==
As of 24 May 2025

| Club | Season | League | | | Cup | | Continental | | Total | |
| Club | Season | Division | Apps | Goals | Apps | Goals | Apps | Goals | Apps | Goals |
|---|---|---|---|---|---|---|---|---|---|---|
| Zorky Krasnogorsk | 2018–19 | Russian Second League | 8 | 1 | – | | – | | 8 | 1 |
| Zorky Krasnogorsk | 2019–20 | Russian Second League | 11 | 1 | 2 | 0 | – | | 13 | 1 |
| Zorky Krasnogorsk | Total | | 19 | 2 | 2 | 0 | 0 | 0 | 21 | 2 |
| Ural-2 Yekaterinburg | 2020–21 | Russian Second League | 23 | 0 | – | | – | | 23 | 0 |
| Metallurg Lipetsk | 2021–22 | Russian First League | 25 | 1 | 1 | 0 | – | | 26 | 1 |
| SKA-Khabarovsk | 2022–23 | Russian First League | 25 | 2 | 0 | 0 | – | | 25 | 2 |
| Torpedo Moscow | 2023–24 | Russian First League | 18 | 4 | 0 | 0 | – | | 18 | 4 |
| Torpedo Moscow | 2024–25 | Russian First League | 19 | 0 | 2 | 0 | – | | 21 | 0 |
| Torpedo Moscow | Total | | 37 | 4 | 2 | 0 | 0 | 0 | 39 | 4 |
| Career total | | | 129 | 9 | 5 | 0 | 0 | 0 | 134 | 9 |
