= Pavel Bugalo =

Uzbekistani football goalkeeper

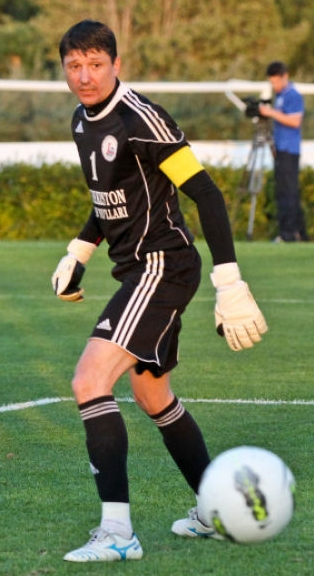

Personal information
- Full name: Pavel Viktorovich Bugalo
- Date of birth: 21 August 1974 (age 52)
- Place of birth: Chirchiq, Uzbek SSR, Soviet Union
- Height: 1.85 m (6 ft 1 in)
- Position: Goalkeeper

Team information
- Current team: Bunyodkor

Youth career
- 1989–1990: Pakhtakor Tashkent

Senior career*
Years	Team	Apps	(Gls)
1991	FC Chirchiq	14	
1992–1999	Pakhtakor Tashkent	172	
2000–2001	Alania Vladikavkaz	10	
2002–2004	Zhenis Astana	51	
2005	Zhetysu	22	
2006	Ordabasy	23	
2007–2010	Bunyodkor	69	
2010	Andijan	5	
2011–2013	Lokomotiv Tashkent	35	
2014–2017	Bunyodkor	12	

International career
1995–2007	Uzbekistan	40	(0)
- * Club domestic league appearances and goals

Pavel Viktorovich Bugalo (Russian: Павел Викторович Бугало; born 21 August 1974) is an Uzbekistani former footballer who played as a goalkeeper.

== Club career ==
He was awarded the Uzbekistan Footballer of the Year title in 1996 and 1997, while playing for Pakhtakor. He later played in Russia with Alania Vladikavkaz and in Kazakhstan, where he became cup champion in 2002 with Zhenis Astana. In 2007-2010 he played for Bunyodkor where he won in 2008 Uzbek championship and Cup. In 2011, he moved to another capital club, Lokomotiv Tashkent and played there 3 seasons. In December 2013 he left Lokomotiv, moving back to Bunyodkor and signed a contract with club.

== International career ==
Bugalo has made 40 appearances for the full Uzbekistan national football team between 1995 and 2007.

== Honours ==
=== Club ===
Pakhtakor

- Uzbek League (2): 1992, 1998
- Uzbek League runner-up (1): 1993
- Uzbek Cup (2): 1993, 1997

Zhenis

- Kazakhstan Cup (1): 2002

Bunyodkor

- Uzbek League (1): 2008
- Uzbek League runner-up (1): 2007
- Uzbek Cup (1): 2008,

Lokomotiv

- Uzbek League runner-up (1): 2013

=== Individual ===
- Uzbekistan Footballer of the Year (2): 1996, 1997
