= Fyodor Novikov =

Russian footballer (1927–2008)

Personal information
- Full name: Fyodor Sergeyevich Novikov
- Date of birth: April 4, 1927
- Date of death: August 25, 2008 (aged 81)
- Height: 1.67 m (5 ft 6 in)
- Position: Forward

Senior career*
Years	Team	Apps	(Gls)
1948–1959	FC Krylia Sovetov Kuybyshev	173	(20)
1959	FC Stroitel Ufa		

Managerial career
- 1961–1964: FC Stroitel Ufa
- 1965–1968: FC Metallurg Kuybyshev
- 1969: FC Spartak Yoshkar-Ola
- 1970–1971: FC Stroitel Ufa
- 1972–1973: FC Sokol Saratov
- 1975–1976: FC Volgar Astrakhan
- 1977: FC Torpedo Taganrog
- 1978–1982: FC Spartak Moscow (assistant)
- 1983: FC Presnya Moscow
- 1984–1989: FC Spartak Moscow (assistant)
- 1990–1991: FC Pakhtakor Tashkent
- 1992: FC Fakel Voronezh
- 1992–1993: FC Lokomotiv Moscow (assistant)
- 1993: FC Kolos Krasnodar
- 1994: FC Kolos Krasnodar
- 1995: FC Kuban Krasnodar
- 1995: FC Lokomotiv Moscow (assistant)
- 1997: FC Spartak Schyolkovo (head of team)
- 1999: FC Kolomna (assistant)
- 1999: FC Kolomna
- 2001: FC Spartak Lukhovitsy
- * Club domestic league appearances and goals

Fyodor Sergeyevich Novikov (Russian: Федор Серге́евич Новиков; April 4, 1927 – August 25, 2008) was a Russian professional football coach and player. He played for “Krylia Sovietov” from Kuibyshev in Class “A” of the USSR Championship in 1948-1958. He worked as a coach at Spartak Moscow, helping K.I. Beskov; during their collaboration, the team became the USSR champion twice and took second place five times.
