= Zhora Hovhannisyan =

Armenian footballer (born 1987)

Personal information
- Date of birth: 16 April 1987 (age 39)
- Place of birth: Yerevan, Soviet Union
- Height: 1.70 m (5 ft 7 in)
- Position: Midfielder

Senior career*
| Years | Team | Apps | (Gls) |
| 2003–2004 | Pyunik Yerevan | 25 | (4) |
| 2004–2007 | Olympiacos | 0 | (0) |
| 2004–2005 | → Egaleo (loan) | 0 | (0) |
| 2005–2006 | → Chaidari (loan) | 5 | (0) |
| 2006–2007 | → Agios Dimitrios (loan) | 15 | (1) |
| 2007–2008 | Agios Dimitrios | 17 | (0) |
| 2008 | Doxa Kranoula | 10 | (0) |
| 2009–2010 | A.O.Kymi F.C. | 30 | (12) |
| 2010 | Saturn Ramenskoye | 0 | (0) |
| 2012–2013 | Lokomotiv Tashkent | 21 | (5) |
| 2013–2014 | Pakhtakor Tashkent | 12 | (3) |

International career
| 2005–2006 | Armenia U19 | 14 | (4) |
| 2007–2009 | Armenia U21 | 6 | (0) |
- * Club domestic league appearances and goals

Zhora Hovhannisyan (Armenian: Ժորա Հովհաննիսյան, born 16 April 1987) is an Armenian former professional footballer who played as a midfielder.

== Club career ==
Hovhannisyan played for FC Pyunik before switching in July 2004 to Greek team Olympiacos. In January 2008, he moved on loan from Olympiacos to Greek Beta Ethniki club Agios Dimitrios. Hovhannisyan joined Doxa Kranoula in July 2008 and, in January 2009, moved to A.O. Kymis, which participates in the local amateur league of Euboea (division 1). In 2010, Zhora joined the now disbanded Russian club Saturn Moscow Oblast. Soon afterward, he joined Lokomotiv Tashkent which was coached by his father Khoren Hovhannisyan. Zhora Hovhannisyan had been announced the best foreign player of Uzbekistan in 2012. Later, in the year of 2013, he signed with most successful Uzbek club, Pakhtakor Tashkent, and was given the No. 10 jersey. He was included in the roster of Pakhtakor for the 2013 season of the AFC Champions League. Hovhannisyan scored his first goal for Pakhtakor in a home 2–0 victory over Neftchi FK.

== International career ==
Hovhannisyan is a former member of the Armenia U19 and Armenia U21 national team. He has not been called to the senior national team because of its strong attacking midfield, according to head coach Vardan Minasyan. Minasyan said he will always keep him under their spotlight and that it was possible he would be invited to the national team in future.

== Personal life ==
Zhora's father is former Soviet footballer Khoren Hovhannisyan, ex-president of Armenia's FC Pyunik team and the Golden Player of Armenia recipient of the UEFA Jubilee Awards.
