= Sergei Bondarenko =

Russian footballer and coach

Personal information
- Full name: Sergei Yuryevich Bondarenko
- Date of birth: 9 November 1948 (age 77)
- Place of birth: Nakhodka, Russian SFSR
- Height: 1.80 m (5 ft 11 in)
- Position: Defender

Senior career*
Years	Team	Apps	(Gls)
1973–1976	FC Luch Vladivostok		
1977	FC Dynamo Leningrad	38	(1)
1978–1981	FC Zenit Leningrad	105	(1)
1982–1990	FC Pakhtakor Tashkent	307	(1)
1991	Traktor Tashkent	12	(1)
1991	FC Pakhtakor Tashkent	21	(0)
1992–1993	FC Okean Nakhodka	66	(0)

Managerial career
- 1994–1995: FC Okean Nakhodka (assistant)
- 1996: FC Okean Nakhodka
- 2001: FC Okean Nakhodka (assistant)
- 2001: FC Okean Nakhodka (caretaker)
- 2002–2004: FC Okean Nakhodka
- 2005: FC Okean Nakhodka (technical director)
- 2009: FC Dynamo Barnaul (assistant)
- * Club domestic league appearances and goals

Sergei Yuryevich Bondarenko (Russian: Серге́й Юрьевич Бондаренко; born 15 April 1955) is a Russian professional football coach and a former player.

== Club career ==
He made his professional debut in the Soviet Second League in 1972 for FC Luch Vladivostok.

== Honours ==
- Soviet Top League bronze: 1980.
