= Gennadi Krasnitsky =

Soviet footballer and manager

Personal information
- Full name: Gennadi Aleksandrovich Krasnitsky
- Date of birth: August 27, 1940
- Place of birth: Tashkent, USSR
- Date of death: June 12, 1988 (aged 47)
- Place of death: Qurghonteppa, USSR
- Position: Striker

Senior career*
Years	Team	Apps	(Gls)
1960–1970	FC Pakhtakor Tashkent	245	(102)

International career
1961	USSR	3	(1)

Managerial career
- 1971: FC Pakhtakor Tashkent (assistant)
- 1974–1976: FC Pakhtakor Tashkent
- 1984–1985: Zvezda Dzhizak
- * Club domestic league appearances and goals

Gennadi Aleksandrovich Krasnitsky (Russian: Геннадий Александрович Красницкий) (August 27, 1940 in Tashkent – June 12, 1988 in Qurghonteppa, suicide by jumping out of the highrise window) was a Soviet football player.

== Career ==
He became the first Uzbekistani player scored 100 goals in Soviet Top League to enter the Grigory Fedotov club. The club of top-scoring footballers in Uzbekistan is named after him - Gennadi Krasnitsky club, was founded in 2010.

== Honours ==
- Grigory Fedotov club member: 112 (goals)

== International career ==
Krasnitsky made his debut for USSR on May 21, 1961 in a friendly against Poland.
