= Pakhtakor FC =

Association football club in Uzbekistan

Pakhtakor
- Full name: Pakhtakor Football Club
- Nicknames: Uzbek: Paxtakorlar (The cotton grower); Uzbek: Sherlar (The Lions); Uzbek: Toshkenliklar jamoasi (People's team)
- Founded: 8 April 1956; 70 years ago
- Ground: Pakhtakor Central Stadium
- Capacity: 35,000
- President: Jakhongir Artikkhodjayev
- Manager: Kamoliddin Tajiev
- League: Uzbekistan Super League
- 2025: Uzbekistan Super League, 2nd of 14
- Website: www.pakhtakor.uz
Home colours	Away colours

Pakhtakor Football Club (Uzbek: Paxtakor futbol klubi) is an Uzbek professional football club, based in the capital city of Tashkent, that competes in the Uzbekistan Super League. Pakhtakor is often considered the most successful football club in Uzbekistan.

Pakhtakor was the only Uzbek club to play in the top-level Soviet football league and the only Central Asian club to appear in a Soviet Cup final. Playing in the Uzbek League since 1992, the club has been the undisputed powerhouse in Uzbekistan since the fall of the Soviet Union, winning sixteen Uzbek League titles, including six in a row from 2002 to 2007. Pakhtakor also won seven consecutive domestic cups between 2001 and 2007, winning eleven cups in total. Players from the club have won Uzbek footballer of the Year honours eight times, and Pakhtakor teammates swept the top three spots in 2002. Club managers have been named Uzbek coach of the year twice.

The team is also a perennial competitor in the AFC Champions League, having reached the semi-finals of the competition twice in 2003 and 2004. Pakhtakor currently holds the record in number of consecutive participations in the AFC Champions League, participating in 11 tournaments from 2002 to 2013.

== Name ==
The word pakhta (پخته) in Old Turkic means "cotton", and kor (or kar) is from the Dari verb kâshtan (also koshtan, kishtan in Uzbek), meaning "to cultivate"; thus the combination Pakhtakor produces a job name which literally means "cotton maker".

=== In popular culture ===
The famous Uzbek singers Shahzoda, Rustam Gaipov, groups "Parvoz"(ex), "Quartet", "Bojalar" and "Ummon" dedicated their songs to Pakhtakor Football Club.

== History ==
=== The early Soviet period ===
Pakhtakor's first official match was on 8 April 1956, date considered to be the club's "birthday". Its first match was played against a team from the city of Perm, Russia (then called Molotov city), presumably FC Zvezda Perm. The first goal in Pakhtakor history was scored by Laziz Maksudov on a penalty shot and Maksudov's goal was the only and game-winning strike.

The team was formed in three months, and the government invited the senior trainer Valentin Bekhtenev from Moscow to recruit the best Tashkent players for the new Pakhtakor. At the time, the club was to represent Uzbekistan in Soviet football.

In 1959, the club was promoted to the Soviet Top League for the first time. During the 1960s, Pakhtakor's squad was anchored by the striker Gennadiy Krasnitskiy, who led it to a 6th-place finish in 1962. After periods back and forth between the Top League and the Soviet First League, the club reached the final of the Soviet Cup competition in 1968 – the only Central Asian club to reach a Soviet Cup final – losing to Torpedo Moscow 1–0. A win in this final could have qualified the club for the UEFA Cup Winners' Cup.

In 1971, Pakhtakor again departed from the First League, but was not long detained in the lower division as it gained promotion the following year.

Pakhtakor was the only Uzbek side to appear in the history of the USSR Championship during the Soviet era, appearing the highest echelon 22 times, and recording 212 wins, 211 draws, and 299 losses. Their best league finish was 6th place, which they achieved twice, in 1962 and 1982.

=== Aircrash 1979 ===
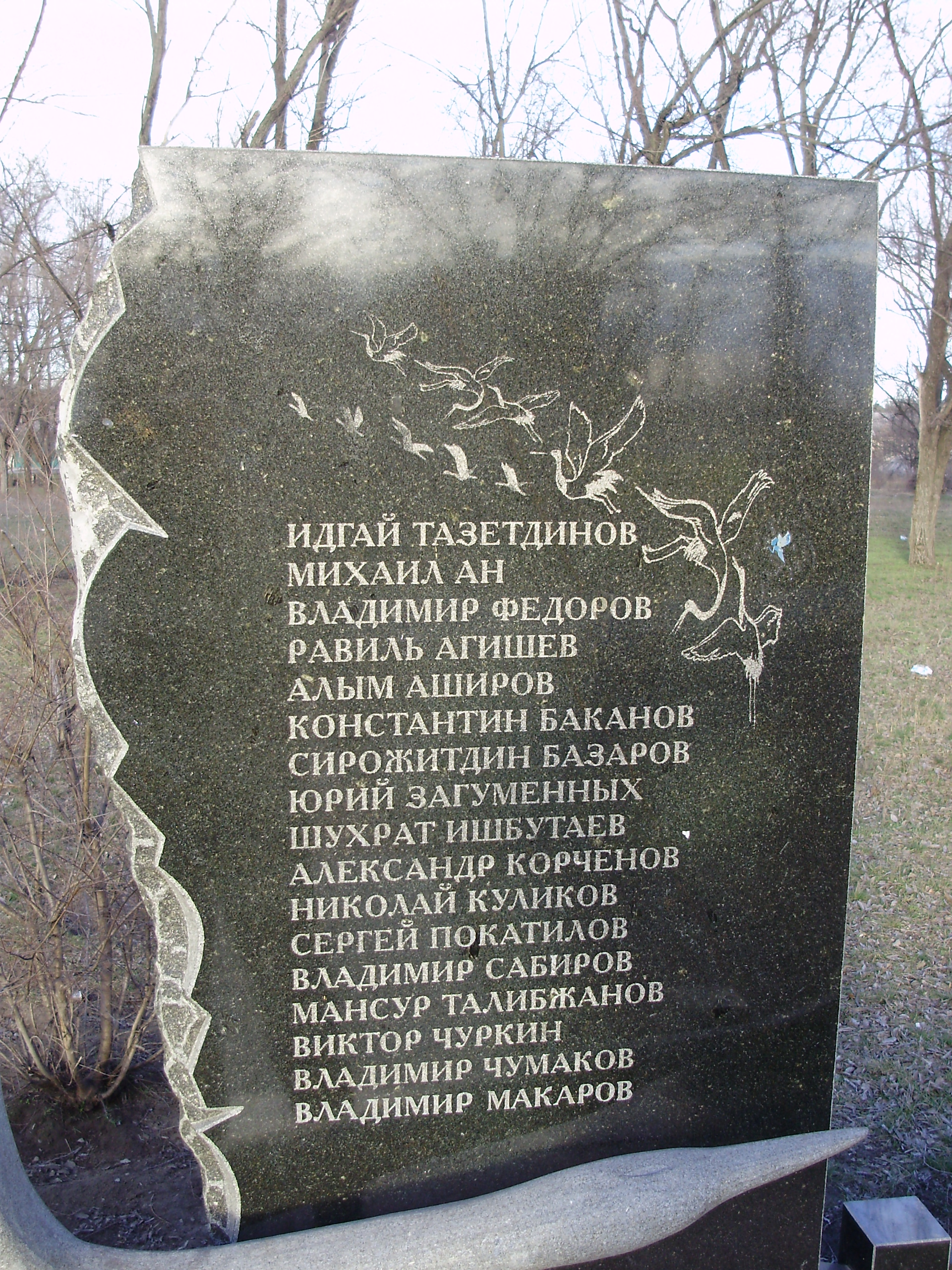
Pakhtakor-79 monument near Kamianske (ex-Dniprodzerzhynsk), Ukraine

On 11 August 1979, Pakhtakor made it back to the Soviet Top League, but shortly thereafter disaster struck the club and Soviet football. During a flight to play Dinamo Minsk, Pakhtakor's plane was involved in a mid-air collision over Dniprodzerzhynsk, Ukrainian SSR. All 178 people aboard both planes involved died.

Seventeen Pakhtakor players and staff members died in the crash:

- Idgay Borisovich Tazetdinov (Trainer), (13.01.1933)
- Mikhail Ivanovich An (Half-back), (19.11.1952)
- Vladimir Ivanovich Fedorov (Forward), (05.01.1956)
- Alim Masalievich Ashirov (Defender), (25.01.1955)
- Ravil Rustamovich Agishev (Defender), (14.03.1959)
- Constantine Alexandrovich Bakanov (Half-back), (25.05.1954)
- Yuri Timofeevich Zagumennykh (Defender), (07.06.1947)
- Alexander Ivanovich Korchenov (Half-back), (04.05.1949)
- Nikolai Borisovich Kulikov (Defender), (25.04.1953)
- Vladimir Vasilyevich Makarov (Forward), (09.03.1947)
- Sergey Constantinovich Pokatilov (Goalkeeper), (20.12.1950)
- Victor Nikolayevich Churkin (Forward), (25.01.1952)
- Sirozhiddin Akhmedovich Bazarov (Forward), (10.08.1961)
- Shukhrat Musinovich Ishbutaev (Forward), (08.02.1959)
- Vladimir Valievich Sabirov (Forward), (14.01.1958)
- Vladimir Vasilyevich Chumaks (Manager), (08.12.1932)
- Mansur Inamdzhanovich Talibdzhanov (Club administrator), (04.04.1944)

Annually, in August, the club sponsors a youth tournament in memory of the people lost in the disaster.

Following the tragedy in 1979, the Soviet Football Association told every Top League team to give three players each, so the team could be redrafted and Pakhtakor was barred from relegation for the next three seasons. Also spurred on by its prolific goalscorer Andrei Yakubik a few years later, Pakhtakor had its best record in 1982, finishing sixth and ahead of several Russian and Ukrainian football powerhouses, such as Zenit Saint Petersburg, CSKA Moscow, and Shakhtar Donetsk. Pakhtakor had a point deducted that season due to exceeding the allowed limit for the games tied (drawn), but it did not influence the club's final standings.

=== The lean years: 1984–1990 ===
After leading Pakhtakor to its best finish, age finally caught up with Yakubik and he moved back to his hometown of Moscow to continue his football career. With the departure of their great forward, the club struggled and spent six years in the Soviet First League. Although the discontent of their fans grew, Pakhtakor's reemergence as a major footballing force followed fast upon the dissolution of the Soviet Union.

=== Modern period, since 1992 ===
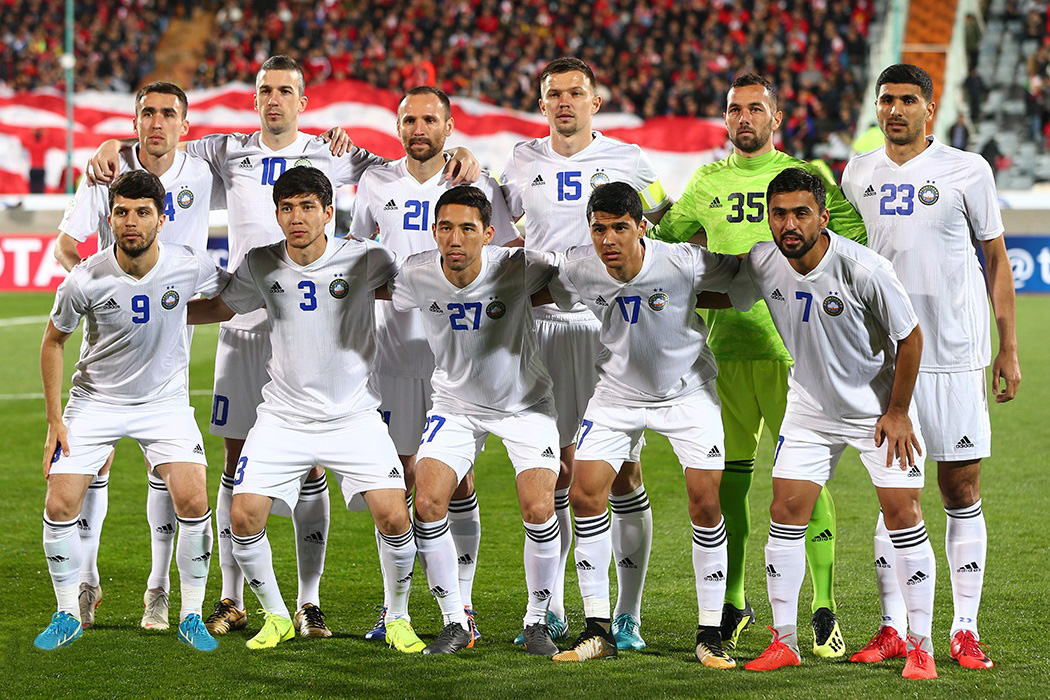
FC Pakhtakor, March 2019

After the USSR collapsed, a new page began in the club's history. 1992 saw Pakhtakor participate in the first season of the Uzbek Oliy League. Since 1992 Pakhtakor have become the most successful Uzbek club with 10 Uzbek League titles, and 11 Uzbek Cups. Until 2014 the club is the only team to have participated in all seasons of the AFC Champions League since its inauguration in 2002. Since 2002 the club participated 11 times in AFC Champions League.

The participation in the AFC Champions League season 2011 was not successful. On 4 May 2011 in a match against Al Nassr, Pakhtakor lost and finished its Asian campaign. In that match, because of many injured players, Pakhtakor's coach Ravshan Khaydarov formed a starting squad from the youth team players and so the club made a record in the AFC Champions League history as the youngest team of the tournament with the players' average age of 21,8 years. The average age of club players for season 2011 was 23,3 years. In the 2014–15 seasons, Pakhtakor won its 10th and 11th League champion titles.

== Rivalries ==
=== Central Asian Derby ===
During the Sovet era, Pakhtakor's main rival was the strongest club in Kazakhstan at that time — Almaty's Kairat.

The confrontation between these two clubs was called the Central Asian derby . It was mandatory for the top leadership of the republics to attend, and the stadiums had real full houses.

This was part of the general rivalry at all levels that arose between Kazakhstan and Uzbekistan in the mid 20th century.

After the collapse of the USSR, Pakhtakor and Kairat began to compete in their respective national championships and, accordingly, did not often meet in international tournaments, limiting themselves to rare friendly matches. In total, the teams played more than 80 official matches against each other.

Even during the Soviet era, the leading clubs of other Central Asian republics – Dushanbe's CSKA Pamir Dushanbe, Ashgabat's Köpetdag Aşgabat and Bishkek's Alga — were considered Pakhtakor's main rivals.

=== Capital derby ===
Since Bunyodkor's promotion to the Uzbek League, matches between the two clubs from the capital is considered by supporters on both sides and football journalists as the Uzbek capital derby or the Toshkent derby.

=== El Clasico ===
The match between Pakhtakor and Neftchi Farg'ona is one of the most popular rivalries in Uzbek League held since 1992. The first match between the two clubs was played on 25 May 1992 in Tashkent.

== Stadium ==
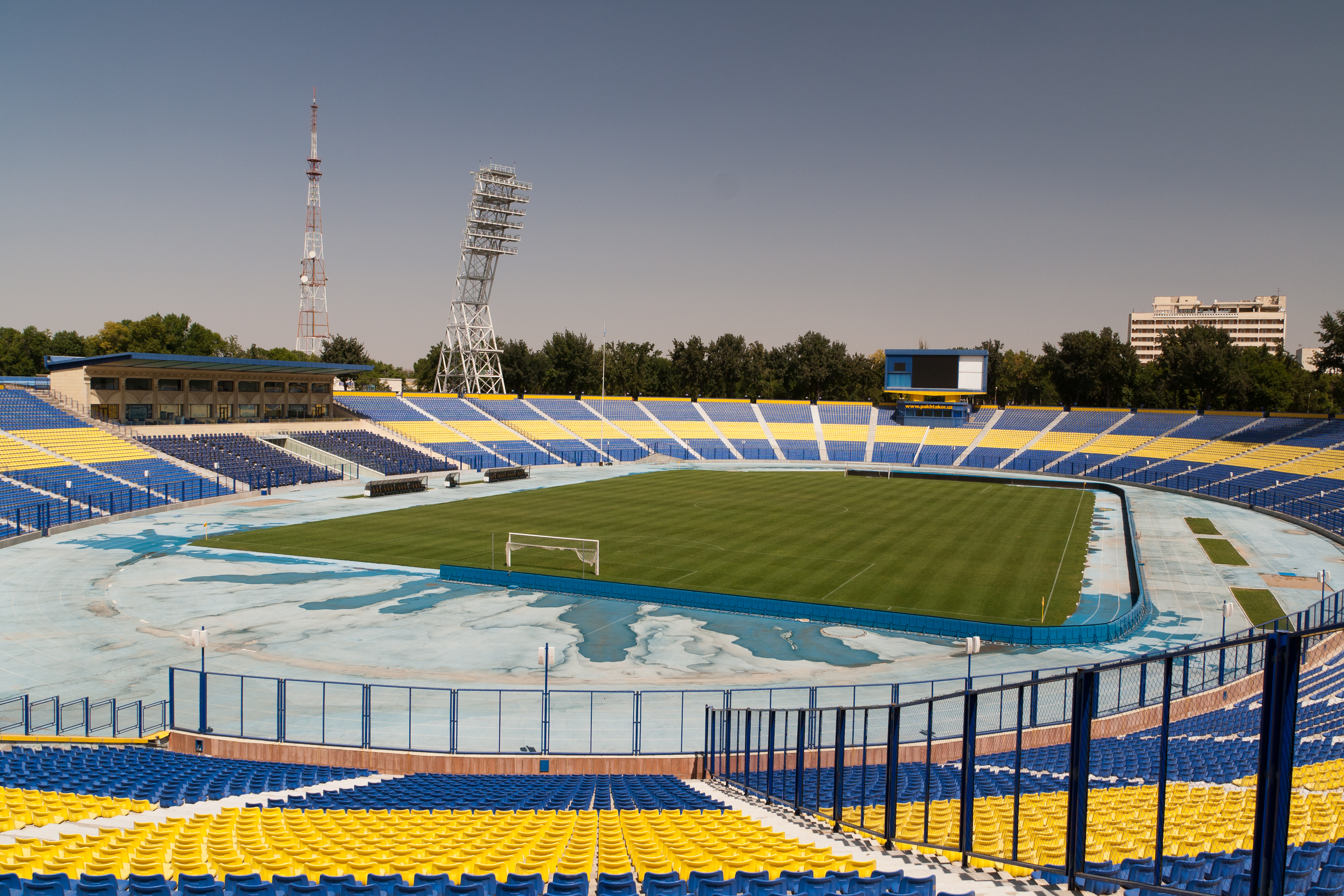
Pakhtakor Markaziy Stadium in Tashkent

Pakhtakor Markaziy Stadium was built in 1956 with a capacity of 55.000 spectators. The stadium was renovated in 1996, and in July 2007 club management announced the next renovation. Reconstruction work finished in 2009, the capacity was reduced to 35.000 and the stadium became an all-seater stadium. In January 2010, the stadium was chosen as the best sporting facility in 2009 of Uzbekistan.

== Players ==
=== Current squad ===
As of 10 September 2026

Note: Flags indicate national team as defined under FIFA eligibility rules; some limited exceptions apply. Players may hold more than one non-FIFA nationality.

No.	Pos.	Nation	Player
4	DF	IRQ	Zaid Tahseen
5	DF	IRI	Morteza Pouraliganji
7	DF	UZB	Khojiakbar Alijonov
8	DF	UZB	Dilshod Saitov
9	MF	UZB	Ibrokhim Ibrokhimov
10	MF	UZB	Akmal Mozgovoy
11	FW	UZB	Khojimat Erkinov
12	GK	UZB	Vladimir Nazarov
14	FW	UZB	Rustam Turdimurodov
17	FW	UZB	Dostonbek Khamdamov
18	MF	UZB	Abubakir Shukurullaev

No.	Pos.	Nation	Player
20	DF	UZB	Dilshod Abdullaev
21	MF	IRQ	Bashar Resan
23	MF	UZB	Abdurauf Buriev
27	MF	UZB	Sardor Sabirkhodjaev (captain)
29	FW	IRQ	Aymen Hussein
34	DF	UZB	Sherzod Nasrullaev
35	GK	UZB	Sanjar Kuvvatov
50	FW	BRA	Flamarion
55	DF	UZB	Mukhammadrasul Abdumazhidov
77	FW	UZB	Oybek Bozorov
90	FW	NGR	Stephen Chinedu (on loan from Surkhon)

==== Out on loan ====
Note: Flags indicate national team as defined under FIFA eligibility rules; some limited exceptions apply. Players may hold more than one non-FIFA nationality.

No.	Pos.	Nation	Player

=== Youth squad ===
Note: Flags indicate national team as defined under FIFA eligibility rules; some limited exceptions apply. Players may hold more than one non-FIFA nationality.

No.	Pos.	Nation	Player
13	DF	UZB	Islom Anvarov
18	MF	UZB	Saidumarkhon Saidnurullaev
26	MF	IRI	Mohammadreza Kooshki
29	MF	UZB	Muhriddin Pazildinov
31	MF	UZB	Muhammadali Usmonov
32	MF	UZB	Asadbek Beglarkhonov
37	DF	UZB	Sarvarbek Adhamov
38	DF	UZB	Temur Odilov
39	MF	UZB	Shahzod Imomov
41	MF	UZB	Rustambek Fomin
42	DF	UZB	Muhammadali Zohidov

No.	Pos.	Nation	Player
43	GK	UZB	Maksim Murkayev
44	MF	UZB	Daler Tuxsanov
45	DF	UZB	Rustam Pazilov
46	DF	UZB	Alisher Mominov
47	DF	UZB	Javohir Bahodirov
48	DF	UZB	Behzod Nematov
51	MF	UZB	Nodirkhon Habibullaev
55	DF	UZB	Muhammadrasul Abdumajidov
62	MF	UZB	Danat Miftakhutdinov
75	GK	UZB	Shahzod Suyunov
99	FW	UZB	Akbar Uktamov
—	FW	TKM	Arslan Wepaýew

== Personnel ==
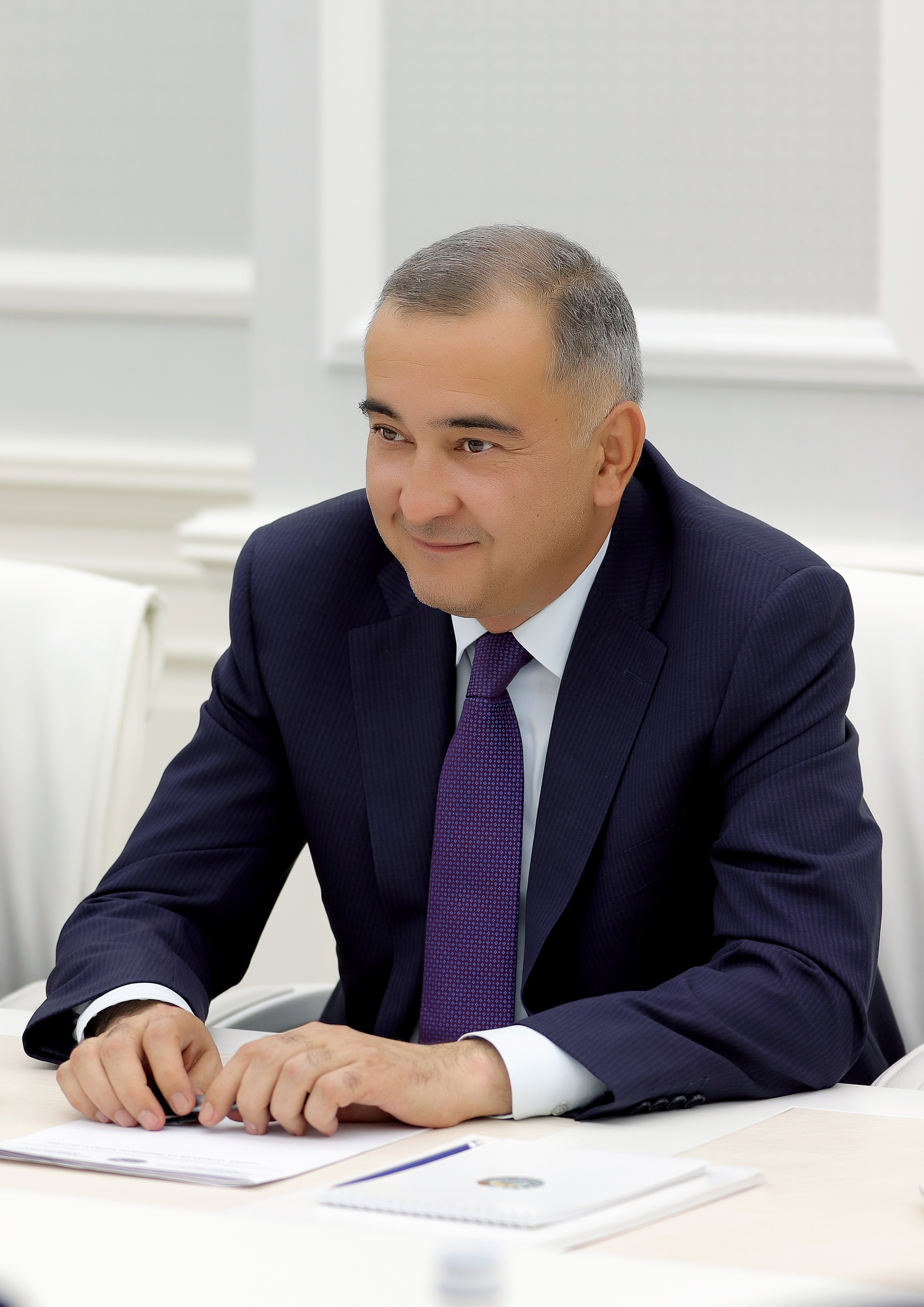
Jakhongir Artikkhodjayev is the current club president.

=== Management ===
Office	Name
President	Jakhongir Artikkhodjayev
Vice-president	Dilshod Karimov
General director	Dmitry Adisman
Director of General Affairs	Maksim Shatskikh
Director of General Affairs	Nikolay Minchev

=== Current technical staff ===
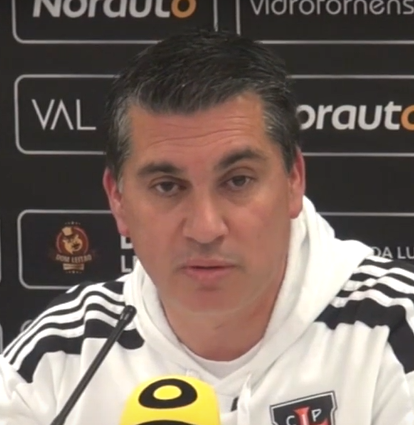
Pedro Moreira former coach.

As of 4 December 2024

Position	Name
Head coach	(Uzbekistan) Kamoliddin Tajiev
Assistant coach	(Portugal) José Borges
Assistant coach	(Portugal) Marco Leite
Assistant coach	(Portugal) Miguel Soares
Goalkeeper coach	(Portugal) Ricardo Vasconcelos

=== Managerial history ===
As of match played 29 March 2025

List of Pakhtakor FC managers
Name	From	To	Duration	P	W	D	L	Win %
(Soviet Union) Valentin Bakhtenev	1956	1956						
(Soviet Union) Yury Khodotov	1957	1957						
(Soviet Union) Lev Olshansky	1957	1959						
(Soviet Union) Alexander Keller	1960	1963						
(Soviet Union) Gavriil Kachalin	1963	1963						
(Soviet Union) Alexander Abramov	1964	1964						
(Soviet Union) Mikhail Yakushin	1965	1966						
(Soviet Union) Boris Arkadyev	1967	1967						
(Soviet Union) Yevgeny Yeliseyev	1968	1968						
(Soviet Union) Mikhail Yakushin	1969	1970						
(Soviet Union) Alexander Keller	1971							
(Soviet Union) Vyacheslav Solovyov	1972	1975						
(Soviet Union) Gavriil Kachalin	1975							
(Soviet Union) Anatoli Bashashkin	1976							
(Soviet Union) Gennadi Krasnitsky	1976							
(Soviet Union) Alexander Kochetkov	1977	1979						
(Soviet Union) Oleh Bazylevych	1979							
(Soviet Union) Sergei Mosyagin	1980	1980						
(Hungary) Ishtvan Sekech	1981	1985						
(Soviet Union) Viktor Tikhonov	1986							
(Soviet Union) Berador Abduraimov	1987	1988						
(Soviet Union) Viktor Nosov	1989	1989						
(Soviet Union) Fyodor Novikov	1990	1991						
(Soviet Union) Ahral Inayatov	1991	1991						
(Russia) Aleksandr Tarkhanov	1991	1992						
(Uzbekistan) Ahral Inayatov	1992							
(Uzbekistan) Bahadir Ibrahimov	1993	1993						
(Uzbekistan) Rustam Akramov	1994							
(Uzbekistan) Ahral Inayatov	1994							
(Netherlands) Hans Verèl	1995	1996						
(Uzbekistan) Alexander Ivankov	1996	1997						
(Brazil) Ubirajara Veiga da Silva	1998	1999						
(Uzbekistan) Alexander Ivankov	2000							
(Russia) Sergei Butenko	2001	2002						
(Uzbekistan) Viktor Djalilov	2002							
(Uzbekistan) Ravshan Khaydarov	2002							
(Turkmenistan) Täçmyrat Agamyradow	2003	2006						
(Russia) Valery Nepomnyashchy	2006							
(Uzbekistan) Ravshan Khaydarov	2006	2007						
(Uzbekistan) Viktor Djalilov	2008	2009						
(Montenegro) Miodrag Radulović	1 January 2010	3 May 2010	122 days					
(Uzbekistan) Ravshan Khaydarov	4 May 2010	27 September 2011	1 year, 146 days					
(Uzbekistan) Murad Ismailov	28 September 2011	27 December 2011	90 days					
(Serbia) Dejan Đurđević	28 December 2011	20 June 2012	175 days					
(Uzbekistan) Murad Ismailov	20 June 2012	31 December 2013	1 year, 194 days					
(Uzbekistan) Samvel Babayan	3 January 2014	23 June 2015	1 year, 171 days					
(Uzbekistan) Numon Khasanov	8 July 2015	29 May 2016	326 days					
(Uzbekistan) Grigory Kolosovsky	30 May 2016	5 April 2017	310 days					
(Uzbekistan) Ravshan Khaydarov	6 April 2017	1 June 2017	56 days					
(Georgia (country)) Shota Arveladze	23 June 2017	21 December 2020	3 years, 181 days	124	90	18	16	72.58
(Netherlands) Pieter Huistra	6 January 2021	10 January 2022	1 year, 160 days	37	23	8	6	62.16
(North Macedonia) Slavče Vojneski	11 January 2022	7 July 2022	177 days	17	8	5	4	47.06
(Uzbekistan) Maxim Shatskikh	14 July 2022	4 December 2024	2 years, 143 days	90	43	22	25	47.78
(Portugal) Pedro Moreira	4 December 2024	4 May 2025	151 days	6	2	0	4	33.33
(Portugal) Kamoliddin Tajiev	4 May 2024	present	1 year, 195 days					33.33

== Notable players ==
=== Former players ===
Had international caps for their respective countries. Players whose name is listed in bold represented their countries while playing for Pakhtakor.

USSR/Uzbekistan

- (Soviet Union) **Gennadi Krasnitsky**
- (Soviet Union) Berador Abduraimov
- (Soviet Union) Yuri Pshenichnikov
- (Soviet Union) Alim Ashirov
- (Soviet Union) **Manuchar Machaidze**
- (Soviet Union) **Mikhail An**
- (Soviet Union) Vladimir Makarov
- (Soviet Union) Aleksandr Yanovskiy
- (Soviet Union) Vladimir Fyodorov
- (Soviet Union) Andrei Yakubik
- (Soviet Union) Marat Kabayev
- (Soviet Union) Sergei Bondarenko
- (Soviet Union) (Greece) **Vasilis Hatzipanagis**
- (Soviet Union) (Germany) **Edgar Gess**
- (Soviet Union) (Armenia) **Khoren Oganesian**
- (Soviet Union) (Uzbekistan) (Russia) **Valeri Kechinov**
- (Soviet Union) (Uzbekistan) (Russia) **Andrei Piatnitski**
- (Soviet Union) (Uzbekistan) **Mirjalol Qosimov**
- (Soviet Union) (Uzbekistan) **Gennadi Denisov**
- (Soviet Union) (Uzbekistan) **Ilkhom Sharipov**
- (Soviet Union) (Uzbekistan) **Igor Shkvyrin**
- (Soviet Union) (Uzbekistan) **Azamat Abduraimov**
- (Uzbekistan) (Kazakhstan) **Kairat Utabayev**
- (Soviet Union) (Turkmenistan) **Röwşen Muhadow**
- (Uzbekistan) **Jaloliddin Masharipov**
- (Uzbekistan) **Ignatiy Nesterov**
- (Uzbekistan) **Andrey Akopyants**
- (Uzbekistan) **Bakhtiyor Ashurmatov**
- (Uzbekistan) **Server Djeparov**
- (Uzbekistan) **Timur Kapadze**
- (Uzbekistan) **Zaynitdin Tadjiyev**
- (Uzbekistan) **Alexander Geynrikh**
- (Uzbekistan) **Anvarjon Soliev**
- (Uzbekistan) **Odil Ahmedov**
- (Uzbekistan) **Oleg Shatskikh**
- (Uzbekistan) **Jafar Irismetov**
- (Uzbekistan) **Anzur Ismailov**
- (Uzbekistan) **Pavel Bugalo**
- (Uzbekistan) **Khojiakbar Alijonov**
- (Uzbekistan) **Egor Krimets**
- (Uzbekistan) **Sadriddin Abdullaev**
- (Uzbekistan) **Stanislav Andreev**
- (Uzbekistan) **Igor Sergeev**
- (Uzbekistan) **Sardor Rashidov**
- (Uzbekistan) **Khojimat Erkinov**
- (Uzbekistan) **Dostonbek Khamdamov**
- (Uzbekistan) **Vladimir Kozak**

Former USSR countries

- (Armenia) Zhora Hovhannisyan
- (Belarus) **Pavel Pavlyuchenko**
- (Georgia (country)) **Irakli Klimiashvili**
- (Georgia (country)) **Kakhi Makharadze**
- (Kazakhstan) **Aleksandr Krokhmal**
- (Kyrgyzstan) (Germany) **Kimi Merk**
- (Lithuania) **Virginijus Baltušnikas**
- (Lithuania) **Gintaras Kvitkauskas**
- (Tajikistan) (Uzbekistan) **Akmal Kholmatov**
- (Turkmenistan) **Artur Geworkyan**
- (Turkmenistan) **Maksim Belyh**
- (Turkmenistan) **Goçguly Goçgulyýew**
- (Ukraine) Vladyslav Lyutyi
- (Turkmenistan) Konstantin Sosenko

Others countries

- (Australia) (England) Rostyn Griffiths
- (Brazil) Anderson
- (Brazil) Fábio Pinto
- (Brazil) Tiago Bezerra
- (Brazil) Jhonatan
- (Brazil) Jonatan Lucca
- (Brazil) Flamarion
- (Bulgaria) **Kamen Hadzhiev**
- (Colombia) Brayan Riascos
- (Croatia) **Jurica Buljat**
- (Guinea-Bissau) (Portugal) **Esmaël Gonçalves**
- (Iran) **Morteza Pouraliganji**
- (Iraq) **Aymen Hussein**
- (Iraq) **Bashar Resan**
- (Iraq) **Zaid Tahseen**
- (Israel) Gidi Kanyuk
- (Japan) Naoya Shibamura
- (North Macedonia) **Dušan Savić**
- (Montenegro) Adnan Orahovac
- (Montenegro) Sanibal Orahovac
- (Montenegro) **Marko Simić**
- (Montenegro) Darko Marković
- (Montenegro) (England) Oliver Sarkic
- (Montenegro) **Ilija Martinović**
- (Netherlands) Matthew Steenvoorden
- (Nigeria) Stephen Chinedu
- (Nigeria) Uche Iheruome
- (Poland) Przemysław Banaszak
- (Poland) **Michał Kucharczyk**
- (Poland) Piotr Parzyszek
- (Serbia) Bojan Miladinović
- (Serbia) Milan Nikolić
- (Serbia) Dragan Ćeran
- (Serbia) Bojan Miladinović
- (Serbia) Bojan Matić
- (Serbia) Milorad Janjuš
- (Switzerland) **Eren Derdiyok**

== Recent seasons ==
=== Domestic record ===
Champions	Runners-up	3rd Place, 4th Place or Losing semi-finalists

Season	League									Uzbekistan Cup	Top goalscorer
Season	Div.	Pos.	Pl.	W	D	L	GS	GA	P	Uzbekistan Cup	League
1992	1st	1st	32	24	3	5	94	40	51	First round	24
1993	1st	2nd	30	20	7	3	74	29	47	Winner	15
1994	1st	8th	30	13	9	8	56	37	35	Semi-final	14
1995	1st	4th	30	20	5	5	67	27	65	Quarter-final	17
1996	1st	6th	30	15	3	12	50	30	48	Runner-up	12
1997	1st	5th	34	18	7	9	65	35	61	Winner	11
1998	1st	1st	30	24	4	2	96	29	76	Semi-final	22
1999	1st	4th	30	18	4	8	69	42	58	N/A	15
2000	1st	7th	38	17	9	12	67	51	60	Quarter-final	20
2001	1st	2nd	34	23	3	8	72	32	72	Winner	16
2002	1st	1st	30	24	2	4	85	22	74	Winner	14
2003	1st	1st	30	25	2	3	82	23	77	Winner	13
2004	1st	1st	26	22	3	1	81	15	69	Winner	12
2005	1st	1st	26	21	2	3	78	15	65	Winner	29
2006	1st	1st	30	25	2	3	84	12	77	Winner	18
2007	1st	1st	30	26	4	0	83	13	82	Winner	16
2008	1st	2nd	30	23	5	2	64	14	74	Runner-up	17
2009	1st	2nd	30	18	10	2	69	16	64	Winner	16
2010	1st	2nd	26	17	6	3	41	19	57	Quarter-final	11
2011	1st	3rd	26	15	6	5	33	17	51	Winner	7
2012	1st	1st	26	18	5	3	51	16	59	Semi-final	13
2013	1st	4th	26	17	3	6	45	25	54	Semi-final	6
2014	1st	1st	26	23	3	0	54	14	72	Semi-final	11
2015	1st	1st	30	24	3	3	66	23	75	Semi-final	23
2016	1st	5th	30	15	7	8	49	30	52	Third round	11
2017	1st	3rd	30	18	5	7	44	28	59	Round of 16	13
2018	1st	2nd	20	11	4	5	38	17	46	Runner-up	17
2019	1st	1st	26	22	3	1	75	18	69	Winner	23
2020	1st	1st	26	21	2	3	76	18	65	Winner	21
2021	1st	1st	26	19	3	4	51	18	60	Runner-up	16
2022	1st	1st	26	15	9	2	47	18	54	Semi-final	20
2023	1st	1st	26	16	5	5	41	25	53	Round of 16	13
2024	1st	6th	26	11	5	10	42	37	38	Semi-final	13
2025	1st	2nd	30	18	6	6	59	23	60	Winner	20

== Individual records ==
=== Most appearances ===
Lists of the players with the most caps and top goalscorers for the club, (players in bold signifies current Pakhtakor player). This list includes goals from Uzbekistan Super League and USSR League.

As of 7 December 2024
Player		Position	Years	Total
1	(Soviet Union) Gennadi Denisov	Defender	1978–1986 1987–1991	384
2	(Soviet Union) Berador Abduraimov	Forward	1960–1968 1970–1974	346
3	(Soviet Union) Sergey Bondarenko	Defender	1982–1991	333
4	(Soviet Union) Aleksandr Yanovskiy	Goalkeeper	1979–1986 1988–1990	308
5	(Soviet Union) Marat Kabayev	Forward	1980–1986 1987–1988 1989–1990	283
6	(Soviet Union) Tulagan Isakov	Forward	1967–1979	267
7	(Soviet Union) Viktor Varyukhin	Midfielder	1968–1976	260
8	(Soviet Union) Gennadi Krasnitsky	Forward	1960–1970	247
9	(Soviet Union) Mikhail An	Midfielder	1970–1979	241
10	(Soviet Union) Vladimir Shtern	Defender	1964–1973	237

=== Top goalscorers ===
Note: this includes goals scored in all competitions.

As of 7 December 2024
Player		Years	Goals(League goals only)
1	(Serbia) Dragan Ceran	2018–2024	141(109)
2	(Soviet Union) (Uzbekistan) Igor Shkvyrin	1983–1985 1989–1991 1998–1999 2000–2001	136(131)
3	(Soviet Union) Berador Abduraimov	1960–1968 1970–1974	124(120)
4	(Uzbekistan) **Igor Sergeev**	2011–2017 2018–2020 2025–	122(98)
5	(Soviet Union) Gennadi Krasnitsky	1960–1970	109(102)
6	(Uzbekistan) Anvarjon Soliev	2002–2007 2013–2016	88(83)
7	(Uzbekistan) Zayniddin Tadjiyev	2002–2004 2006–2009	84 (71)
8	(Uzbekistan) Alexander Geynrikh	2002 2005 2007–2011	77(66)
9	(Uzbekistan) Server Djeparov	2002–2007	76(64)
10	(Soviet Union) Andrei Yakubik	1979; 1980–1984	73(70)

== Asian record head to head ==
=== Overview ===
As of match played 2 November 2026

Competition	Played	Win	D	Lost	GF	GA
Asian Cup Winners' Cup	14	6	2	6	37	23
Asian Club Championship	2	1	0	1	5	9
AFC Champions League / AFC Champions League Elite	130	51	31	48	166	174
Total	146	58	33	55	208	206

Season	Competition	Round	Club	Home	Away	Aggregate
1994–95	Asian Cup Winners' Cup	Preliminary round	(Tajikistan) Ravshan Kulob	10–0		
1994–95	Asian Cup Winners' Cup	Preliminary round	(Kazakhstan) Taraz	0–3		
1994–95	Asian Cup Winners' Cup	Preliminary round	(Kyrgyzstan) Alay-Osh-Pirim	5–1		
1994–95	Asian Cup Winners' Cup	Preliminary round	(Turkmenistan) Merw	4–0		
1998–99	Asian Cup Winners' Cup	First round	(Tajikistan) Khujand	4–1	1–1	5–2
1998–99	Asian Cup Winners' Cup	Second round	(Turkmenistan) Nisa Aşgabat	6–0	0–5	6–5
1998–99	Asian Cup Winners' Cup	Third round	(Saudi Arabia) Al-Ittihad	0–1	0–3	0–4
1999–2000	Asian Club Championship	First round	(Kazakhstan) Irtysh Pavlodar	5–2	0–7	5–9
2001–02	Asian Cup Winners' Cup	First round	(Kyrgyzstan) SKA-PVO Bishkek	3–1	1–2	4–3
2001–02	Asian Cup Winners' Cup	Second round	(Tajikistan) Regar-TadAZ Tursunzoda	2–2	1–3	3–5
2002–03	AFC Champions League	Group stage	(Iran) Persepolis	1–0		1st
2002–03	AFC Champions League	Group stage	(Iraq) Al-Talaba	3–0		1st
2002–03	AFC Champions League	Group stage	(Turkmenistan) Nisa Aşgabat	3–0		1st
2002–03	AFC Champions League	Semi-final	(Thailand) BEC Tero Sasana	1–0	1–3	2–3
2004	AFC Champions League	Group stage	(Iran) Zob Ahan	2–0	0–1	1st
2004	AFC Champions League	Group stage	Qatar	1–0	0–0	1st
2004	AFC Champions League	Group stage	(Bahrain) Riffa	w/o	w/o	1st
2004	AFC Champions League	Quarter-final	(United Arab Emirates) Al Wahda	4–0	1–1	5–1
2004	AFC Champions League	Semi-final	(South Korea) Seongnam	0–0	0–2	0–2
2005	AFC Champions League	Group stage	(Saudi Arabia) Al-Ahli	2–1	0–3	2nd
2005	AFC Champions League	Group stage	(Iraq) Al-Zawra'a	1–2	0–1	2nd
2005	AFC Champions League	Group stage	(Syria) Al-Jaish	4–1	2–0	2nd
2006	AFC Champions League	Group stage	(Kuwait) Qadsia	2–2	1–2	2nd
2006	AFC Champions League	Group stage	(Iran) Foolad	2–0	3–1	2nd
2006	AFC Champions League	Group stage	(Syria) Al-Ittihad	2–0	1–2	2nd
2007	AFC Champions League	Group stage	(Saudi Arabia) Al Hilal	0–2	0–2	2nd
2007	AFC Champions League	Group stage	Kuwait	2–1	1–0	2nd
2007	AFC Champions League	Group stage	(Iran) Esteghlal	w/o	w/o	2nd
2008	AFC Champions League	Group stage	(Kuwait) Qadsia	0–1	2–2	2nd
2008	AFC Champions League	Group stage	(Iraq) Erbil	2–0	5–1	2nd
2008	AFC Champions League	Group stage	(Qatar) Al-Gharafa	2–0	2–2	2nd
2009	AFC Champions League	Group stage	(Saudi Arabia) Al Hilal	1–1	0–2	2nd
2009	AFC Champions League	Group stage	(Iran) Saba Qom	2–1	2–0	2nd
2009	AFC Champions League	Group stage	(United Arab Emirates) Al-Ahli	2–0	2–1	2nd
2009	AFC Champions League	Round of 16	(Saudi Arabia) Ettifaq	2–1		
2009	AFC Champions League	Quarter-final	(Saudi Arabia) Al-Ittihad	1–1	0–4	1–5
2010	AFC Champions League	Group stage	(Saudi Arabia) Al Shabab	1–3	1–2	2nd
2010	AFC Champions League	Group stage	(Iran) Sepahan	2–1	0–2	2nd
2010	AFC Champions League	Group stage	(United Arab Emirates) Al Ain	3–2	1–0	2nd
2010	AFC Champions League	Round of 16	(Qatar) Al-Gharafa	0–1		
2011	AFC Champions League	Group stage	(Qatar) Al Sadd	1–1	1–2	4th
2011	AFC Champions League	Group stage	(Saudi Arabia) Al Nassr	2–2	0–4	4th
2011	AFC Champions League	Group stage	(Iran) Esteghlal	2–1	2–4	4th
2012	AFC Champions League	Group stage	(Saudi Arabia) Al-Ittihad	1–2	0–4	3rd
2012	AFC Champions League	Group stage	(United Arab Emirates) Baniyas	1–1	0–2	3rd
2012	AFC Champions League	Group stage	(Qatar) Al-Arabi	3–1	1–0	3rd
2013	AFC Champions League	Group stage	(Qatar) Lekhwiya	2–2	1–3	4th
2013	AFC Champions League	Group stage	(United Arab Emirates) Al Shabab	1–2	1–0	4th
2013	AFC Champions League	Group stage	(Saudi Arabia) Ettifaq	1–0	0–2	4th
2015	AFC Champions League	Group stage	(United Arab Emirates) Al Ain	0–1	1–1	3rd
2015	AFC Champions League	Group stage	(Iran) Naft Tehran	2–1	1–1	3rd
2015	AFC Champions League	Group stage	(Saudi Arabia) Al Shabab	0–2	2–2	3rd
2016	AFC Champions League	Group stage	(Saudi Arabia) Al Hilal	2–2	1–4	3rd
2016	AFC Champions League	Group stage	(Iran) Tractor Sazi	1–0	0–2	3rd
2016	AFC Champions League	Group stage	(United Arab Emirates) Al Jazira	3–0	3–1	3rd
2018	AFC Champions League	Play-off round	(Qatar) Al-Gharafa	1–2		
2019	AFC Champions League	Preliminary round 2	(Iraq) Al-Quwa Al-Jawiya	2–1		
2019	AFC Champions League	Play-off round	(United Arab Emirates) Al-Nasr	2–1		
2019	AFC Champions League	Group stage	(Iran) Persepolis	1–0	1–1	3rd
2019	AFC Champions League	Group stage	(Saudi Arabia) Al Ahli	1–0	1–2	3rd
2019	AFC Champions League	Group stage	(Qatar) Al Sadd	2–2	1–2	3rd
2020	AFC Champions League	Group stage	(United Arab Emirates) Shabab Al-Ahli	2–1	0–0	1st
2020	AFC Champions League	Group stage	(Iran) Shahr Khodro	3–0	1–0	1st
2020	AFC Champions League	Group stage	(Saudi Arabia) Al Hilal	0–0	1–2	1st
2020	AFC Champions League	Round of 16	(Iran) Esteghlal	2–1		
2020	AFC Champions League	Quarter-final	(Iran) Persepolis	0–2		
2021	AFC Champions League	Group stage	(Iran) Tractor	3–3	0–0	3rd
2021	AFC Champions League	Group stage	(Iraq) Al-Quwa Al-Jawiya	1–0	0–0	3rd
2021	AFC Champions League	Group stage	(United Arab Emirates) Sharjah	1–1	1–4	3rd
2022	AFC Champions League	Group stage	(Iran) Sepahan	1–3	1–2	4th
2022	AFC Champions League	Group stage	(Qatar) Al-Duhail	0–3	2–3	4th
2022	AFC Champions League	Group stage	(Saudi Arabia) Al-Taawoun	5–4	1–0	4th
2023–24	AFC Champions League	Group stage	(Saudi Arabia) Al Fayha	1–4	0–2	3rd
2023–24	AFC Champions League	Group stage	(United Arab Emirates) Al Ain	0–3	3–1	3rd
2023–24	AFC Champions League	Group stage	(Turkmenistan) Ahal	3–0	1–1	3rd
2024–25	AFC Champions League Elite	League phase	(United Arab Emirates) Al Wasl	0–1	–	8th
2024–25	AFC Champions League Elite	League phase	(Iran) Persepolis	–	1–1	8th
2024–25	AFC Champions League Elite	League phase	(Iraq) Al-Shorta	–	0–0	8th
2024–25	AFC Champions League Elite	League phase	(Qatar) Al-Rayyan	0–1	–	8th
2024–25	AFC Champions League Elite	League phase	(Iran) Esteghlal	–	0–0	8th
2024–25	AFC Champions League Elite	League phase	(United Arab Emirates) Al Ain	1–1	–	8th
2024–25	AFC Champions League Elite	League phase	(Qatar) Al-Gharafa	–	0–1	8th
2024–25	AFC Champions League Elite	League phase	(Qatar) Al Sadd	2–1	–	8th
2024–25	AFC Champions League Elite	Round of 16	(Saudi Arabia) Al Hilal	1–0	0–4	1–4
2026–27	AFC Champions League Elite	Preliminary stage	(Jordan) Al-Hussein	3–0		
2026–27	AFC Champions League Elite	League phase	(Saudi Arabia) Al-Ahli	–	1–1	
2026–27	AFC Champions League Elite	League phase	(Saudi Arabia) Al Qadsiah	1–1	–	
2026–27	AFC Champions League Elite	League phase	(Iraq) Al-Quwa Al-Jawiya	–	0–1	
2026–27	AFC Champions League Elite	League phase	(Saudi Arabia) Al-Nassr	2–6	–	
2026–27	AFC Champions League Elite	League phase	(Saudi Arabia) Al-Ittihad	–		
2026–27	AFC Champions League Elite	League phase	(Iran) Tractor		–	
2026–27	AFC Champions League Elite	League phase	(Iran) Esteghlal		–	
2026–27	AFC Champions League Elite	League phase	(Saudi Arabia) Al Hilal	–		
2027–28

== Honours ==
Pakhtakor FC honours
Type	Competition	Titles	Seasons	Runner-Up
Domestic	Super League	16	1992, 1998, 2002, 2003, 2004, 2005, 2006, 2007, 2012, 2014, 2015, 2019, 2020, 2021, 2022, 2023	1993, 2001, 2008, 2009, 2010, 2018, 2025
Domestic	Uzbekistan Cup	14	1993, 1997, 2001, 2002, 2003, 2004, 2005, 2006, 2007, 2009, 2011, 2019, 2020, 2025	1996, 2008, 2018, 2021
Domestic	Super Cup	2	2021, 2022	1999, 2015, 2016, 2023, 2024
Domestic	League Cup	1	2019	–
Domestic	Soviet First League	1	1972	–
Domestic	Soviet Cup	–	–	1967–68
International	CIS Cup	1	2007	2008
International	IFA Shield (IFA) (Note: Fourth oldest football tournament, organized by the IFA (W.B.), and played between the local clubs of West Bengal and other invited ones.)	1	1993	–
International	AFC Champions League	–	–	Semi-final 2002–03, 2004
