= 1979 Dniprodzerzhynsk mid-air collision =

Fatal aviation accident in Ukraine

1979 Dniprodzerzhynsk mid-air collision Aeroflot Flight 7628 · Aeroflot Flight 7880
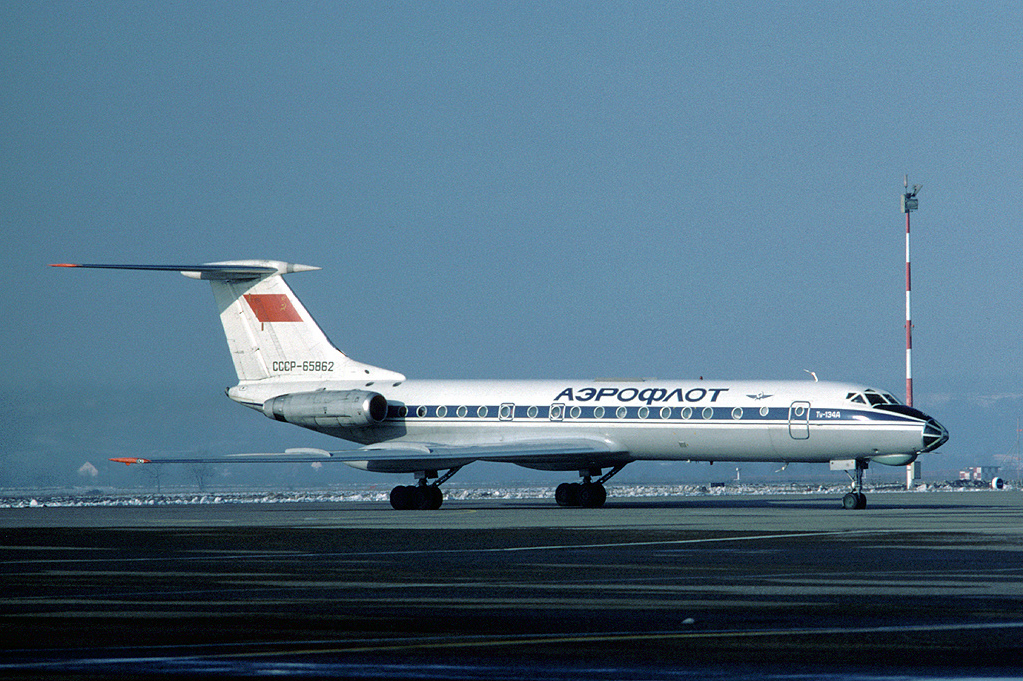
- A Tupolev Tu-134A operated by Aeroflot that was similar to both aircraft involved in the accident

Accident
- Date: 11 August 1979
- Summary: Mid-air collision due to ATC errors
- Site: Near Dniprodzerzhynsk, Ukrainian SSR, Soviet Union; 48°35′18″N 34°39′22″E
- Total fatalities: 178
- Total survivors: 0

First aircraft
- Type: Tupolev Tu-134A
- Operator: Aeroflot
- IATA flight No.: SU7628
- ICAO flight No.: AFL7628
- Call sign: AEROFLOT 7628
- Registration: СССР-65816
- Flight origin: Voronezh Airport, Russian SFSR
- Destination: Chișinău Airport, Moldavian SSR
- Occupants: 94
- Passengers: 88
- Crew: 6
- Fatalities: 94
- Survivors: 0

Second aircraft
- Type: Tupolev Tu-134AK
- Operator: Aeroflot
- IATA flight No.: SU7880
- ICAO flight No.: AFL7880
- Call sign: AEROFLOT 7880
- Registration: СССР-65735
- Flight origin: Donetsk Airport, Ukrainian SSR
- Destination: Minsk-1 International Airport, Belarusian SSR
- Occupants: 84
- Passengers: 77
- Crew: 7
- Fatalities: 84
- Survivors: 0

On 11 August 1979, a mid-air collision occurred over the Ukrainian SSR, near the city of Dniprodzerzhynsk (now Kamianske). The aircraft involved were both Tupolev Tu-134As on scheduled domestic passenger flights, operated by Aeroflot. All 178 people aboard both aircraft died in the accident.

The official Soviet aviation board investigation of the accident concluded that the crash was caused by "mistakes and violations" made by air traffic controllers.

== Aircraft ==
=== Aeroflot Flight 7628 ===
Aeroflot Flight 7628 was a twin turbofan Tu-134A passenger jet, serial number 4352210 and registration CCCP-65816, that was built at the Kharkiv Aviation Plant in 1974 and which carried out its first flight on 24 March of that year. It was operated by the airline's Moldova division and, at the time of the accident, had logged 12,739 hours and completed 7683 takeoff-landing cycles.

There were 88 passengers and six crew members on board the Tupolev airliner.

=== Aeroflot Flight 7880 ===
Aeroflot Flight 7880 was a Tu-134AK airliner, serial number 1351405 and registration CCCP-65735, that was completed at the Kharkiv aviation plant on 5 November 1971 and which made its first flight later that year. At the time of the accident, the aircraft had accumulated 10,753 flight hours through 7075 cycles.

There were 77 passengers and seven crew members on board the aircraft. Passengers included 17 members of the Tashkent-based Pakhtakor Football Club.

== Air traffic control ==
En route to their destinations both aircraft passed through the Kharkiv regional air traffic control (ATC) center airspace. This area was characterized by high traffic density and air traffic controllers often had to carry more than a dozen aircraft simultaneously. This problem had been discussed since the early 1970s, but by the end of the decade the problem had not been solved. The southwest sector, covering from 180° to 255° was especially complex and unpredictable.

On 11 August 1979, at 07:50 MSK a new shift of air traffic controllers began work, headed by Sergei Sergeev. In the difficult southwest sector he employed an inexperienced 3rd-class controller, 20-year-old Nikolai Zhukovsky, under the supervision of 1st-class controller, 28-year-old Vladimir Alexandrovich Sumskoy.

Adding to the situation that day was that Leonid Brezhnev was embarking on a trip to Crimea. Authorities wanted to give the Soviet leader a clear flight path and this caused considerable disruption of the airline flight operations in the area.

== Accident sequence ==
Flight 7628 was flying on Airway 50 (Magdalinovka – Ball, course 201°) and Flight 7880 was on Airway 147 corridor (Dnipropetrovsk – Kremenchuk, course 300°). These corridors intersect at an angle of 99° north-east of Dniprodzerzhynsk. Because of previous errors, the controller's perception of the location of each aircraft was incorrect. When the ATC supervisor heard the radio traffic and saw the aircraft converging on the radar screen he realized the catastrophic situation and attempted to correct it. At 13:34:07 the ATC controller ordered aircraft 86676 (IL-62) from 9,000 to 9,600 metres (29,500 to 31,500 ft). At 13:34:21 ATC controller repeated the order and then directed Flight 7880 from 8400 meters to the now vacant altitude at 9,000 metres (30,000 ft).

- 13:34:07 ATC to aircraft 86676 "Take 9600."
- 13:34:21 ATC to aircraft 86676 "Take 9600."
- 13:34:23 ATC to Flight 7880 "and you take a 9. Over 8400 Dneprodzerzhinsk crossover."
- 13:34:25 aircraft 86676 to ATC "9600."
- 13:34:33 (inaudible.) "Got it ... 8400"

The controller heard a muffled reply and assumed it was an acknowledgement from Flight 7880 – but the muffled transmission was actually from aircraft 86676 and Flight 7880 remained at 8400 meters.

== Collision ==
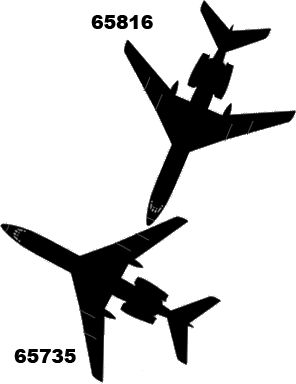
Relative angle of aircraft at impact. Registration 65816 was Flight 7628. Registration 65735 was Flight 7880.

Flight 7628 had strayed to the left of the airway by approximately 4 kilometres (2 mi; 2 nmi), while Flight 7880 was to the left by 0.5 kilometres (0.31 mi; 0.27 nmi). At 13:35:38 both aircraft suddenly disappeared from ATC radar screens. Zhukovsky tried to contact them, but they did not respond. At 13:37, Igor Chernov, the captain of an Antonov An-2 (CCCP-91734) flying from Cherkasy to Donetsk, reported "Something is falling from the sky!" At 13:40 Chernov reported seeing aircraft parts in the area of Dniprodzerzhynsk (now Kamianske).

Both aircraft collided in a cloud at an altitude of 8,400 metres (27,600 ft), approximately over Dniprodzerzhynsk. Flight 7880's right wing sliced through Flight 7628's forward fuselage, tearing off part of 7880's right wing, the debris of which was ingested by 7880's right engine. The impact spun 7628 to the right, causing the tails of both aircraft to collide at which time the left engine of 7628 struck the keel of 7880, and 7628's right wing was torn off. Flight 7628 tumbled out of control and broke up, with debris scattered over an area measuring 16 by 3 kilometres (9.9 by 1.9 mi; 8.6 by 1.6 nmi). Damage to 7880 included the loss of most of the empennage, one of the engines and a section of the right wing. The pilots of 7880 attempted an emergency landing, but at an altitude of approximately 4,000 metres (13,000 ft) they lost control and at 13:38 crashed north-east of Dniprodzerzhynsk, completely destroying the aircraft.

== Investigation ==
In the subsequent investigation the commission concluded that center of gravity and takeoff weights of both aircraft were within the normal range and that there was no explosion or fire prior to the collision. The commission also found that maintenance was carried out in accordance with the requirements of the regulations and that the level of training of flight crews of both aircraft, as well as their work experience, were not the cause of the crash.

The investigators also discovered that the more experienced controller, Vladimir Sumskoy, was in error during the last minutes before the crash, having received a vague answer without a call sign, he did not confirm if the crew of Flight 7880 understood. Sumskoy had previously received penalties for violations, including improper communication and phraseology.

The senior controller, Sergei Sergeev, was found to have complicated the air traffic control environment by changing the responsibilities assigned to personnel, including assigning Sumskoy to supervise Zhukovsky.

Nine months after the disaster, a court sentenced controllers Zhukovsky and Sumskoy to 15 years imprisonment in a penal colony. Sumskoy served 6.5 years, then was released for good behavior. As of 2008, he lived in Kharkiv. Zhukovsky reportedly committed suicide. Sergei Sergeev, the chief controller on duty that day, was not prosecuted.

== Memorial ==
In August 2009, 30 years after the crash, a monument was unveiled to the players of the Uzbek Pakhtakor team in the small village of Kurilyvka near Dneprodzerzhinsk, at the site of the crash. The names of all team members are engraved on the monument. At the foot is a granite soccer ball, and above is a stone swan.

A monument to members of the Pakhtakor team was also erected at the Botkin Cemetery in Tashkent.

== See also ==
- Aeroflot accidents and incidents in the 1970s
- Aeroflot accidents and incidents
- List of civilian mid-air collisions
- List of accidents involving sports teams
