= Uzbek El Clasico =

Uzbek El Classico
- Other names: Ўзбек классикоси
- Location: (Uzbekistan) Tashkent and Ferghana
- Teams: Pakhtakor & Neftchi
- First meeting: Tashkent, 25 May 1992
- Latest meeting: 29 August 2026, NEF 1-0 PAKH
- Next meeting: 22 October 2026

Statistics
- Total meetings: 80; Uzbekistan Super League: 63; Uzbek Cup: 16; Super Cup: 1
- Most wins: Pakhtakor (43)

Uzbek El Clasico is the name given to any football match between rival clubs Pakhtakor Tashkent and Neftchi Fergana. The first match between the two clubs was played in 1992.

== History ==
Since Independence of Uzbekistan matches between the country's most titled football clubs Pakhtakor and Neftchi Ferghana from Fergana city always aroused enormous interest of football fans. The match of two rivals became later O'zbek Classikosi (Uzbek Cyrillic: "Ўзбек классикоси") or "Uzbek El Clasico" by analogy with El Clásico in Spain.

=== By competition ===
As of match played 29 August 2026

Competition	Matches	Pakhtakor wins	Draws	Neftchi wins	Pakhtakor goals	Neftchi goals
Uzbekistan Super League	63	31	10	22	105	80
Uzbekistan Cup	16	12	0	4	35	17
Uzbekistan Super Cup	1	0	0	1	0	1
Total	80	43	10	27	140	98

== Matches since 1992 ==
#	Season	Date	Competition	Home team	Score	Away team	Home goal scorers	Away goal scorers	Attendance
1	1992	25 May 1992	League	Pakhtakor Tashkent	1–2	Neftchi Fergana	I.Sharipov 62'	R.Durmonov 50'; A.Durmonov 72'	2,000
2	1992	21 October 1992	League	Neftchi Fergana	2–0	Pakhtakor Tashkent	R.Bozorov 47'; A.Tsarayev 72'		10,000
3	1993	2 May 1993	League	Neftchi Fergana	2–1	Pakhtakor Tashkent	R.Durmonov 17', 20'	S.Morgulis 72'	15,500
4	1993	3 October 1993	League	Pakhtakor Tashkent	5–4	Neftchi Fergana	M.Aliev 36'; N.Khasanov 38'; Sh.Maqsudov 42'; F.Magometov 63'; M.Kasymov 87'	Atoyan 40', 53'; R.Durmonov 55'; A.Durmonov 78'	8,000
5	1994	11 May 1994	League	Neftchi Fergana	5–3	Pakhtakor Tashkent			
6	1994	23 October 1994	League	Pakhtakor Tashkent	2–0	Neftchi Fergana			
7	1995	13 May 1995	League	Neftchi Fergana	1–1	Pakhtakor Tashkent			
8	1995	21 October 1995	League	Pakhtakor Tashkent	3–0	Neftchi Fergana			
9	1996	22 June 1996	League	Pakhtakor Tashkent	1–1	Neftchi Fergana	Y.Nazarov 80'	R.Durmonov 36'	8,000
10	1996	6 September 1996	League	Neftchi Fergana	2–1	Pakhtakor Tashkent	R.Durmonov 9', 65'	D.Nazarov 10'	12,000
11	1996	10 November 1996	Cup	Neftchi Fergana	0–0 (5-4p)	Pakhtakor Tashkent			2,000
12	1997	16 July 1997	League	Pakhtakor Tashkent	2–1	Neftchi Fergana	D.Nazarov; Akopyants	R.Durmonov	
13	1997	12 August 1997	League	Neftchi Fergana	2–1	Pakhtakor Tashkent	Sh.Maqsudov; A.Fyodorov	D.Nazarov	
14	1997	25 November 1997	Cup	Pakhtakor Tashkent	3–2 (a.e.t.)	Neftchi Fergana	A.Abduraimov 36' (pen.); Akopyants 88', 118'	Knyazev 12'; R.Durmonov 80'	21,000
15	1998	18 April 1998	League	Pakhtakor Tashkent	1–0	Neftchi Fergana			
16	1998	12 November 1998	League	Neftchi Fergana	1–1	Pakhtakor Tashkent			
17	1999	30 April 1999	League	Neftchi Fergana	3–1	Pakhtakor Tashkent	Sh.Maqsudov 4', 70'; Isoqov 56'	A.Abduraimov 74'	
18	1999	25 September 1999	League	Pakhtakor Tashkent	1–2	Neftchi Fergana			
19	2000	21 March 2000	League	Pakhtakor Tashkent	0–1	Neftchi Fergana		Ni 75'	
20	2000	Round 37	League	Neftchi Fergana	3–1	Pakhtakor Tashkent	Knyazev 2'; R.Durmonov 30', 40'	Khodiyev 42'	
21	2001	10 June 2001	League	Pakhtakor Tashkent	1–2	Neftchi Fergana			
22	2001	4 August 2001	Cup	Pakhtakor Tashkent	2–1	Neftchi Fergana	L.Koshelev 26', 57'	A.Berdiev 34'	
23	2001	11 August 2001	League	Neftchi Fergana	4–1	Pakhtakor Tashkent			
24	2002	6 April 2002	League	Pakhtakor Tashkent	2–0	Neftchi Fergana	G.Goçgulyýew 14'; L.Koshelev 74'		
25	2002	4 August 2002	Cup	Pakhtakor Tashkent	6–3 (a.e.t.)	Neftchi Fergana	G.Goçgulyýew 3', 115'; S.Lebedev 4', 110' (o.g.); L.Koshelev 70'; Z.Tadjiyev 118'	Ni 14'; Kurbonov 84'; Kholmatov 90'	
26	2002	5 December 2022	League	Neftchi Fergana	4–0	Pakhtakor Tashkent	A.Berdiev 2', 45'; Kurbonov 74'; R.Durmonov 89'		
27	2003	15 May 2003	League	Pakhtakor Tashkent	1–0	Neftchi Fergana	Djeparov 67'		
28	2003	14 September 2003	League	Neftchi Fergana	1–2	Pakhtakor Tashkent			
29	2004	14 June 2004	League	Pakhtakor Tashkent	6–1	Neftchi Fergana	I.Magdeev 2', 82'; G.Goçgulyýew 13' (pen.); Ponomaryov 44'; Kapadze 79'; Vakhobov 90+2'	Otakuziev 35'	6,000
30	2004	10 August 2004	Cup	Pakhtakor Tashkent	1–0	Neftchi Fergana	A.Nikolaev 32'		6,000
31	2004	2 September 2004	Cup	Neftchi Fergana	1–2	Pakhtakor Tashkent	I.Kovalenko 78'	G.Goçgulyýew 44'; Shishelov 62'	15,000
32	2004	26 September 2004	League	Neftchi Fergana	1–1	Pakhtakor Tashkent	Otakuziev 59'	Shishelov 53'	15,500
33	2005	18 June 2005	League	Neftchi Fergana	1–0	Pakhtakor Tashkent	Kholmatov 58'		17,000
34	2005	26 August 2005	League	Pakhtakor Tashkent	2–0	Neftchi Fergana	A.Nikolaev 14'; A.Soliev 49'		12,500
35	2005	26 November 2005	Cup	Pakhtakor Tashkent	1–0	Neftchi Fergana	A.Soliev 24'		5,000
36	2006	27 March 2006	League	Pakhtakor Tashkent	3–0	Neftchi Fergana	Kletskov 2'; Z.Tadjiyev 47'; Djeparov 90+2'		7,000
37	2006	21 October 2006	League	Neftchi Fergana	1–1	Pakhtakor Tashkent	I.Kovalenko 5'	V.Kiryan 48'	17,000
38	2007	17 June 2007	League	Pakhtakor Tashkent	4–0	Neftchi Fergana	Bayramov 1'; Djeparov 68'; Magdeev 89'; Geynrikh 90'		7,000
39	2007	27 August 2007	League	Neftchi Fergana	0–3	Pakhtakor Tashkent		Bayramov 12'; Iheruome 74'; Koshelev 76'	19,500
40	2007	26 September 2007	Cup	Pakhtakor Tashkent	4–1	Neftchi Fergana	Z.Tadjiyev 44'; Suyunov 47'; Djeparov 53' (pen.); Kapadze 85'	Askaraliev 24'	4,500
41	2007	6 November 2007	Cup	Neftchi Fergana	3–2	Pakhtakor Tashkent	Kholmatov 4', 39'; Yakubov 51'	Suyunov 13'; Geynrikh 21' (pen.)	8,500
42	2008	1 March 2008	League	Pakhtakor Tashkent	2–0	Neftchi Fergana	Geynrikh 33'; Marković 62'		8,000
43	2008	28 July 2008	Cup	Neftchi Fergana	0–2	Pakhtakor Tashkent		Z.Tadjiyev 17', 71'	14,523
44	2008	2 August 2008	Cup	Pakhtakor Tashkent	3–0	Neftchi Fergana	Ismailov 58'; Iheruome 66', 84'		3,152
45	2008	23 November 2008	League	Neftchi Fergana	1–0	Pakhtakor Tashkent	Alijonov 26' (pen.)		14,615
46	2009	15 May 2009	League	Pakhtakor Tashkent	3–0	Neftchi Fergana	Miladinovic 15'; Z.Tadjiyev 62', 68'		8,751
47	2009	26 July 2009	Cup	Pakhtakor Tashkent	4–1	Neftchi Fergana			
48	2009	30 July 2009	Cup	Neftchi Fergana	3–2	Pakhtakor Tashkent			
49	2009	9 September 2009	League	Neftchi Fergana	0–2	Pakhtakor Tashkent		F.Tojiyev 20'; Marković 32'	17,846
50	2010	6 May 2010	League	Neftchi Fergana	3–3	Pakhtakor Tashkent	Berdiev 26' (pen.); Saidov 54'; Alijonov 90+4'	Geynrikh 23'; Tukhtakhujaev 52' (o.g.); Kletskov 65'	18,050
51	2010	12 June 2010	League	Pakhtakor Tashkent	1–0	Neftchi Fergana	Geynrikh 18'		3,262
52	2011	22 March 2011	League	Pakhtakor Tashkent	1–0	Neftchi Fergana	Makharadze 15'		4,025
53	2011	2 August 2011	Cup	Neftchi Fergana	0–1	Pakhtakor Tashkent		Andreev 45' (pen.)	14,838
54	2011	17 August 2011	Cup	Pakhtakor Tashkent	2–1	Neftchi Fergana	Sharofetdinov 25' (pen.); Makharadze 43'	Jumaev 41'	2,337
55	2011	22 October 2011	League	Neftchi Fergana	4–1	Pakhtakor Tashkent	Berdiev 1', 39'; Khalikov 8', 53'	Andreev 24' (pen.)	17,236
56	2012	11 June 2012	League	Neftchi Fergana	3–1	Pakhtakor Tashkent	Sh.Nasibullayev 57'; Saidov 66'; A.Berdiev 82'	Khashimov 46'	13,058
57	2012	5 October 2012	League	Pakhtakor Tashkent	3–0	Neftchi Fergana	Abdukholiqov 4', 57'; Makharadze 10'		8,263
58	2013	17 March 2013	League	Pakhtakor Tashkent	1–0	Neftchi Fergana	Khashimov 49'		5,218
59	2013	29 October 2013	League	Neftchi Fergana	0–3	Pakhtakor Tashkent		Sergeev 18'; Kilichev 36'; Sh.Karimov 88'	5,325
60	2014	23 March 2014	League	Neftchi Fergana	1–2	Pakhtakor Tashkent	Jiamurodov 84'	Kozak 13'; Andreev 37'	5,205
61	2014	9 August 2014	League	Pakhtakor Tashkent	1–0	Neftchi Fergana	Kozak 58'		1,932
62	2015	16 May 2015	League	Pakhtakor Tashkent	2–0	Neftchi Fergana	Krimets 36'; Sergeev 70'		4,227
63	2015	30 September 2015	League	Neftchi Fergana	3–2	Pakhtakor Tashkent	Kadirov 16'; Khakimov 20'; Isroilov 78'	Orahovac 28'; Sergeev 85'	12,815
64	2016	28 May 2016	League	Pakhtakor Tashkent	1–2	Neftchi Fergana	Masharipov 68'	Bobodzhonov 39'; Isroilov 79'	1,375
65	2016	15 October 2016	League	Neftchi Fergana	1–0	Pakhtakor Tashkent	Khakimov 18'		2,972
66	2017	8 March 2017	League	Neftchi Fergana	0–0	Pakhtakor Tashkent			8,117
67	2017	12 August 2017	League	Pakhtakor Tashkent	6–0	Neftchi Fergana	Akhmedov 53'; Sergeev 60', 64'; Bezerra 78', 87'; Kozak 89'		6,155
68	2018	31 March 2018	League	Pakhtakor Tashkent	3–0	Neftchi Fergana	Isroilov 45' (o.g.); Simić 46'; Masharipov 64'		15,023
69	2018	12 June 2018	League	Neftchi Fergana	1–1	Pakhtakor Tashkent	Berdiev 88'	Bezerra 90+4'	3,815
Not held between 2019 and 2021
70	2022	10 March 2022	League	Pakhtakor Tashkent	1–0	Neftchi Fergana	Ćeran 52'		5,130
71	2022	12 August 2022	League	Neftchi Fergana	0–2	Pakhtakor Tashkent		Sabirkhodjaev 29'; Ćeran 72'	2,400
72	2023	10 March 2023	League	Neftchi Fergana	2–1	Pakhtakor Tashkent	Larin 52'; Tabatadze 81' (pen.)	Tursunov 90+9'	17,103
73	2023	5 August 2023	League	Pakhtakor Tashkent	0–1	Neftchi Fergana		Turapov 69'	10,200
74	2024	1 July 2024	League	Neftchi Fergana	0–2	Pakhtakor Tashkent		Khamdamov 16'; Abdumannopov 40'	14,785
75	2024	13 September 2024	League	Pakhtakor Tashkent	0–0	Neftchi Fergana			2,442
76	2025	19 April 2025	League	Neftchi Fergana	0–4	Pakhtakor Tashkent		Adkhamzoda 23', 45+6'; Riascos 42'; Sergeev 45+1'	15,500
77	2025	13 September 2025	League	Pakhtakor Tashkent	2–1	Neftchi Fergana	Turgunboev 11'; Sergeev 45+7' (pen.)	Alibaev 39'	7,950
78	2026	15 March 2026	Super Cup	Neftchi Fergana	1–0	Pakhtakor Tashkent	Ratinho 17'		16,821
79	2026	9 April 2026	League	Neftchi Fergana	0–1	Pakhtakor Tashkent		Khamdamov 22'	18,756
80	2026	29 August 2026	Cup	Neftchi Fergana	1–0	Pakhtakor Tashkent	Perica 81'		18,777

== Statistics ==
As of match played 13 September 2025

=== Goalscorers ===
	Name	Club	Years	League	Cup	Super Cup	Total	Ratio
1	(Uzbekistan) Rustam Durmonov	Neftchi Fergana; Pakhtakor Tashkent	1992-1994, 1996-1997, 2000-2002; 1995	11 (-): (-)	1 (-): (-)	(-)	12 (-)	1
2	(Uzbekistan) Anvar Berdiev	Neftchi Fergana	2000-2013, 2018	7 (-)	1 (-)	(-)	8 (-)	1
3	(Uzbekistan) Zayniddin Tadjiyev	Pakhtakor Tashkent; Neftchi Fergana	2002-2004, 2006, 2007-2009, 2010; 2013	3 (-): (-)	4 (-): (-)	(-)	7 (-)	1
3	(Uzbekistan) Igor Sergeev	Pakhtakor Tashkent	2011-2018, 2018-2021, 2025	7 (11)	(-)	(-)	7 (11)	0.64
5	(Uzbekistan) Leonid Koshelev	Pakhtakor Tashkent	2001-2004, 2005-2006, 2007	2 (-)	3 (-)	(-)	5 (-)	1
5	(Turkmenistan) Goçguly Goçgulyýew	Pakhtakor Tashkent	2002-2005	2 (-)	3 (-)	(-)	5 (-)	1
5	(Uzbekistan) Alexander Geynrikh	Pakhtakor Tashkent	2002, 2005, 2007-2011	4 (-)	1 (-)	(-)	5 (-)	1
8	(Uzbekistan) Shukhrat Maqsudov	Pakhtakor Tashkent; Neftchi Fergana	1992-1996; 1997-2000	1(-); 3 (-)	(-)	(-)	4 (-)	1
8	(Uzbekistan) Server Djeparov	Pakhtakor Tashkent	2001-2007	3 (-)	1 (-)	(-)	4 (-)	1
8	(Tajikistan) Akmal Kholmatov	Neftchi Fergana; Pakhtakor Tashkent	1996-2008, 2014-2016, 2016; 2008-2010	1 (-); 0 (-)	3 (-); 0 (-)	(-)	4 (-)	1
11	(Uzbekistan) Dilmurod Nazarov	Pakhtakor Tashkent	1992-1993, 1995-1998, 2000	3 (-)	(-)	(-)	3 (-)	1
11	(Uzbekistan) Andrey Akopyants	Pakhtakor Tashkent; Neftchi Fergana	1996-1999, 2008; 2014	1 (-): (-)	2 (-): (-)	(-)	3 (-)	1
11	(Uzbekistan) Ildar Magdeev	Pakhtakor Tashkent	2002-2012	3 (-)	(-)	(-)	3 (-)	1
11	(Nigeria) Uche Iheruome	Pakhtakor Tashkent	2005-2010	1 (-)	2 (-)	(-)	3 (-)	1
11	(Georgia (country)) Kakhi Makharadze	Pakhtakor Tashkent	2011-2015	2 (10)	1 (2)	(-)	3 (12)	0.25
11	(Uzbekistan) Stanislav Andreev	Pakhtakor Tashkent	2007-2018	2 (-)	1 (-)	(-)	3 (-)	1
11	(Brazil) Tiago Bezerra	Pakhtakor Tashkent	2017-2019	3 (3)	(-)	(-)	3 (3)	1
11	(Uzbekistan) Vladimir Kozak	Pakhtakor Tashkent	2010-2022	3 (14)	0 (2)	(-)	3 (16)	0.19
19	(Uzbekistan) Abdusamad Durmonov	Neftchi Fergana		2 (-)	(-)	(-)	2 (-)	1
19	(Uzbekistan) Stepan Atayan	Neftchi Fergana	1993-1997	2 (-)	0 (-)	(-)	2 (-)	1
19	(Uzbekistan) Azamat Abduraimov	Pakhtakor Tashkent	1996-1999, 2000	1 (-)	1 (-)	(-)	2 (-)	1
19	(Tajikistan) Vyacheslav Knyazev	Neftchi Fergana	1997, 2000	1 (-)	1 (-)	(-)	2 (-)	1
19	(Uzbekistan) Sergey Ni	Neftchi Fergana		1 (-)	1 (-)	(-)	2 (-)	1
19	(Uzbekistan) Mukhtor Kurbonov	Pakhtakor Tashkent; Neftchi Fergana	2001; 2002	0 (-); 1 (-)	0 (-); 1 (-)	(-)	2 (-)	1
19	(Uzbekistan) Nosirbek Otakuziev	Neftchi Fergana	2003-2009, 2013-2014	2 (-)	(-)	(-)	2 (-)	1
19	(Uzbekistan) Timur Kapadze	Neftchi Fergana; Pakhtakor Tashkent	1998-2001; 2002-2007	0 (-); 1 (-)	0 (-); 1 (-)	(-)	2 (-)	1
19	(Uzbekistan) Aleksey Nikolaev	Pakhtakor Tashkent	2003-2005, 2012	1 (-)	1 (-)	(-)	2 (-)	1
19	(Uzbekistan) Ilya Kovalenko	Neftchi Fergana		1 (-)	1 (-)	(-)	2 (-)	1
19	(Uzbekistan) Vladimir Shishelov	Pakhtakor Tashkent	2004	1 (-)	1 (-)	(-)	2 (-)	1
19	(Uzbekistan) Anvarjon Soliev	Pakhtakor Tashkent	2001-2007, 2013-2016	2 (-)	(-)	(-)	2 (-)	1
19	(Uzbekistan) Aleksandr Kletskov	Pakhtakor Tashkent; Neftchi Fergana	2004-2008, 2010, 2011-2012; 2014	2 (-); 0 (-)	0 (-); 0 (-)	(-)	2 (-)	1
19	(Uzbekistan) Renat Bayramov	Pakhtakor Tashkent		2 (-)	(-)	(-)	2 (-)	1
19	(Uzbekistan) Ilhom Suyunov	Pakhtakor Tashkent	2004-2013	(-)	2 (-)	(-)	2 (-)	1
19	(Montenegro) Darko Marković	Pakhtakor Tashkent	2008-2011	2 (-)	(-)	(-)	2 (-)	1
19	(Uzbekistan) Aziz Alijonov	Neftchi Fergana		2 (-)	(-)	(-)	2 (-)	1
19	(Uzbekistan) Mansur Saidov	Neftchi Fergana		2 (-)	(-)	(-)	2 (-)	1
19	(Uzbekistan) Alisher Khalikov	Neftchi Fergana		2 (-)	(-)	(-)	2 (-)	1
19	(Uzbekistan) Temurkhuja Abdukholiqov	Pakhtakor Tashkent	2011-2014	2 (6)	0 (1)	(-)	2 (7)	0.29
19	(Uzbekistan) Davron Khashimov	Pakhtakor Tashkent	2011-2017	2 (11)	0 (0)	(-)	2 (11)	0.18
19	(Uzbekistan) Sherzod Khakimov	Neftchi Fergana		2 (-)	(-)	(-)	2 (-)	1
19	(Uzbekistan) Atabek Isroilov	Neftchi Fergana		2 (-)	(-)	(-)	2 (-)	1
19	(Uzbekistan) Jaloliddin Masharipov	Pakhtakor Tashkent	2013-2020	2 (6)	(-)	(-)	2 (6)	0.33
19	(Serbia) Dragan Ćeran	Pakhtakor Tashkent	2018-2024	2 (3)	(-)	(-)	2 (3)	0.67
19	(Uzbekistan) Umar Adkhamzoda	Neftchi Fergana; Pakhtakor Tashkent	2020-2023; 2024-2025	2 (7)	(-)	(-)	2 (7)	0.29
19	(Uzbekistan) Dostonbek Khamdamov	Pakhtakor Tashkent	2019-2020, 2021-	2 (8)	0 (1)	0 (1)	{{|2|2 (10)}}	0.2
46	(Uzbekistan) Ilkhom Sharipov	Pakhtakor Tashkent		1 (-)	(-)	(-)	1 (-)	1
46	(Uzbekistan) Ravshan Bozorov	Neftchi Fergana		1 (-)	(-)	(-)	1 (-)	1
46	(Uzbekistan) Albert Tsarayev	Neftchi Fergana		1 (-)	(-)	(-)	1 (-)	1
46	(Uzbekistan) Stanislav Morgulis	Neftchi Fergana		1 (-)	(-)	(-)	1 (-)	1
46	(Uzbekistan) Mirjalol Qosimov	Pakhtakor Tashkent		1 (-)	(-)	(-)	1 (-)	1
46	(Uzbekistan) Farkhad Magametov	Pakhtakor Tashkent		1 (-)	(-)	(-)	1 (-)	1
46	(Uzbekistan) Numon Khasanov	Pakhtakor Tashkent		1 (-)	(-)	(-)	1 (-)	1
46	(Uzbekistan) Murod Aliev	Pakhtakor Tashkent		1 (-)	(-)	(-)	1 (-)	1
46	(Uzbekistan) Yorqin Nazarov	Pakhtakor Tashkent		1 (-)	(-)	(-)	1 (-)	1
46	(Uzbekistan) Andrei Fyodorov	Neftchi Fergana		1 (-)	(-)	(-)	1 (-)	1
46	(Uzbekistan) Umid Isoqov	Neftchi Fergana		1 (-)	(-)	(-)	1 (-)	1
46	(Uzbekistan) Khodiyev	Pakhtakor Tashkent		1 (-)	(-)	(-)	1 (-)	1
46	(Uzbekistan) Bakhriddin Vakhobov	Pakhtakor Tashkent		1 (-)	(-)	(-)	1 (-)	1
46	(Uzbekistan) Vyacheslav Ponomarev	Pakhtakor Tashkent; Neftchi Fergana	2001, 2004-2007; 2013-2014	1 (-)	(-)	(-)	1 (-)	1
46	(Uzbekistan) Vladilsav Kiryan	Pakhtakor Tashkent	2002-2005	1 (-)	(-)	(-)	1 (-)	1
46	(Uzbekistan) Sanzhar Askaraliev	Neftchi Fergana	2004-2011, 2012-2014	(-)	1 (-)	(-)	1 (-)	1
46	(Uzbekistan) Bahtiyorjon Yakubov	Neftchi Fergana	2005-2013, 2015-2018	(-)	1 (-)	(-)	1 (-)	1
46	(Uzbekistan) Anzur Ismailov	Pakhtakor Tashkent	2003-2009, 2020-2021	(-)	1 (-)	(-)	1 (-)	1
46	(Serbia) Bojan Miladinović	Pakhtakor Tashkent	2009-2014	1 (-)	(-)	(-)	1 (-)	1
46	(Uzbekistan) Farhod Tadjiyev	Pakhtakor Tashkent	2007-2009, 2010-2012	1 (-)	(-)	(-)	1 (-)	1
46	(Uzbekistan) Gayrat Jumaev	Neftchi Fergana	2008-2009, 2011-2013	0 (-)	1 (-)	(-)	1 (-)	1
46	(Uzbekistan) Dilshod Sharofetdinov	Pakhtakor Tashkent	2009-2013	0 (-)	1 (-)	(-)	1 (-)	1
46	(Uzbekistan) Shavkat Nasibullayev	Neftchi Fergana	2012-2013	1 (-)	(-)	(-)	1 (-)	1
46	(Uzbekistan) Oybek Kilichev	Pakhtakor Tashkent; Neftchi Fergan	2010, 2012-2014, 2016; 2022	1 (4); 0 (2)	0 (?): (-)	(-)	1 (4)	0.25
46	(Uzbekistan) Sherzod Karimov	Pakhtakor Tashkent; Neftchi Fergana	2009-2018; 2022	1 (12); 0 (0)	0 (?): (-)	(-)	1 (12)	0.08
46	(Uzbekistan) Jahongir Jiamurodov	Neftchi Fergana	2014	1 (1)	(-)	(-)	1 (1)	1
46	(Uzbekistan) Egor Krimets	Pakhtakor Tashkent	2010-2021	1 (8)	(-)	(-)	1 (8)	0.13
46	(Uzbekistan) Umidjon Kadirov	Neftchi Fergana	2012-2017	1 (6)	(-)	(-)	1 (6)	0.17
46	(Montenegro) Adnan Orahovac	Pakhtakor Tashkent	2015-2017	1 (3)	(-)	(-)	1 (3)	0.33
46	(Uzbekistan) Murodbek Bobodzhonov	Neftchi Fergana	2014-2018, 2023	1 (4)	(-)	(-)	1 (4)	1
46	(Uzbekistan) Azimjon Akhmedov	Pakhtakor Tashkent	2016-2018	1 (5)	(-)	(-)	1 (5)	0.2
46	(Montenegro) Marko Simić	Pakhtakor Tashkent	2017-2020	1 (2)	(-)	(-)	1 (2)	0.5
46	(Uzbekistan) Sardor Sabirkhodjaev	Pakhtakor Tashkent	2019-	1 (6)	0 (1)	(-)	1 (7)	0.14
46	(Ukraine) Oleksiy Larin	Pakhtakor Tashkent; Neftchi Fergana	2022; 2022-2023	0 (1); 1 (2)	(-)	(-)	1 (3)	0.33
46	(Georgia (country)) Toma Tabatadze	Neftchi Fergana	2023-2025	1 (1)	(-)	(-)	1 (1)	1
46	(Uzbekistan) Dostonbek Tursunov	Pakhtakor Tashkent	2013-2015, 2017-2018; 2022-2024	0 (2); 1 (1)	(-)	(-)	1 (3)	0.33
46	(Uzbekistan) Diyorjon Turapov	Neftchi Fergana	2023-2025	1 (2)	(-)	(-)	1 (2)	0.5
46	(Uzbekistan) Doniyor Abdumannopov	Pakhtakor Tashkent	2024-2024	1 (2)	(-)	(-)	1 (2)	0.5
46	(Colombia) Brayan Riascos	Pakhtakor Tashkent	2025	1 (2)	(-)	(-)	7 (11)	0.64
46	(Uzbekistan) Azizbek Turgunboev	Pakhtakor Tashkent	2021-2023, 2025-2026	1 (5)	(-)	(-)	1 (5)	0.2
46	(Uzbekistan) Ikromjon Alibaev	Pakhtakor Tashkent; Neftchi Fergana	2022; 2025-	1 (4)	0 (1)	(-)	1 (5)	0.2
46	(Brazil) Ratinho	Neftchi Fergana	2026-	0 (1)	0 (1)	1 (1)	1 (3)	0.33
46	(Croatia) Stipe Perica	Neftchi Fergana	2026-	0 (1)	1 (1)	0 (1)	1 (3)	0.33
	Unknown	Neftchi Fergana		16 (-)	4 (-)	(-)	20 (-)	1
	Unknown	Pakhtakor Tashkent		16 (-)	6 (-)	(-)	22 (-)	1

Own goals

- (Uzbekistan) Sergey Lebedev of Neftchi Fergana against Pakhtakor Tashkent - 4 August 2002
- (Uzbekistan) Sergey Lebedev of Neftchi Fergana against Pakhtakor Tashkent - 4 August 2002
- (Uzbekistan) Islom Tukhtakhujaev of Neftchi Fergana against Pakhtakor Tashkent - 6 May 2010
- (Uzbekistan) Abdujamol Isroilov of Neftchi Fergana against Pakhtakor Tashkent - 31 March 2018

=== Most appearances ===
==== Pakhtakor ====
Player	Appearances	Notes
(Uzbekistan) Murod Aliev	13	
(Uzbekistan) Pavel Bugalo	13	
(Uzbekistan) Nikolay Shirshov	11	
(Uzbekistan) Dilmurod Nazarov	11	

==== Neftchi ====
Player	Appearances	Notes
(Uzbekistan) Sergey Lebedev	17	
(Uzbekistan) Abdusamat Durmonov	16	
(Uzbekistan) Rustam Durmonov	13	
(Uzbekistan) Sergey Ni	13	
