= 1995 Afro-Asian Cup of Nations =

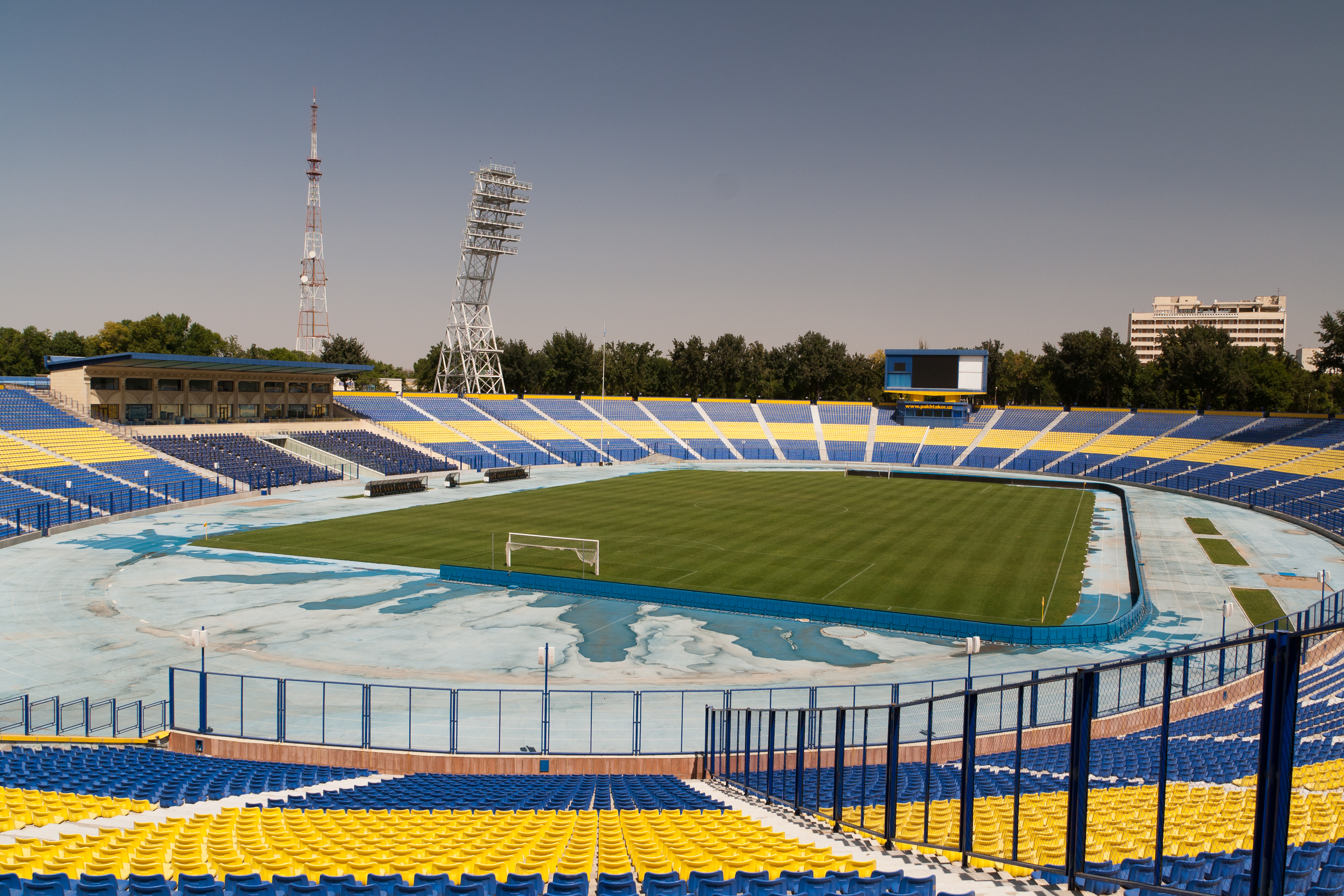
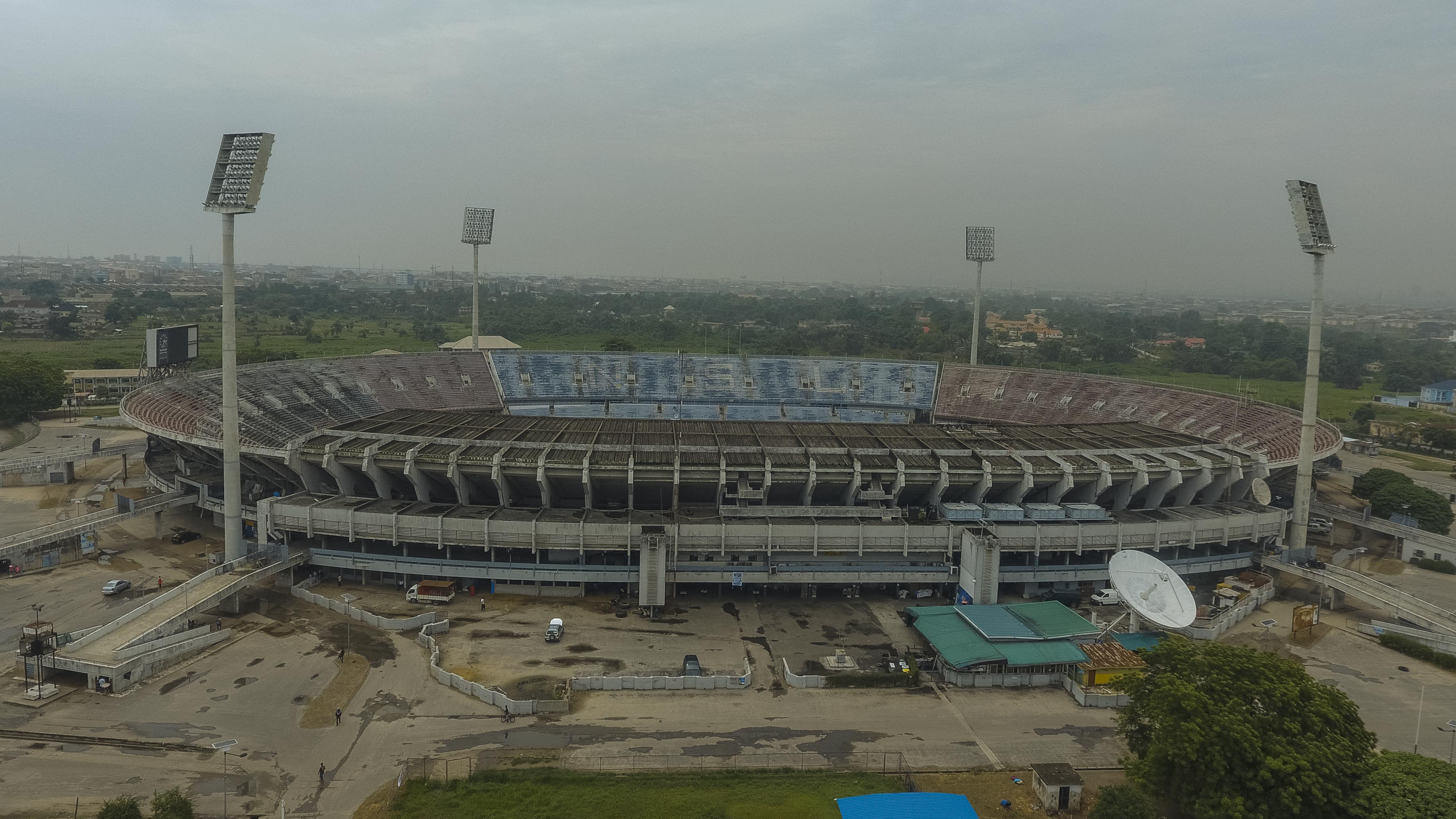
- Pakhtakor & Lagos National Stadiums
| Uzbekistan | Nigeria |
| 2 | 4 |

First leg
| Uzbekistan | Nigeria |
| 2 | 3 |
- Date: 21 October 1995
- Venue: Pakhtakor Stadium, Tashkent
- Referee: Ali Bujsaim (UAE)
- Attendance: 55,000

Second leg
| Nigeria | Uzbekistan |
| 1 | 0 |
- Date: 10 November 1995
- Venue: National Stadium, Lagos
- Referee: Sidi Bekaye Magassa (Mali)
- Attendance: 60,000

The 1995 Afro-Asian Cup of Nations was the sixth edition of the Afro-Asian Cup of Nations, it was contested between Uzbekistan, winners of the 1994 Asian Games, and Nigeria, winners of the 1994 African Cup of Nations. Nigeria won 4–2 on aggregate.

== Qualified teams ==
| Country | Qualified as | Previous appearance in tournament |
|---|---|---|
| Nigeria | 1994 African Cup of Nations champions | Debut |
| Uzbekistan | 1994 Asian Games champions | Debut |

== Match details ==
=== First leg ===
21 October 1995
--:-- UTC+5

| Uzbekistan | 2–3 | Nigeria |
|---|---|---|
| Kasimov 70'; Fyodorov 85' | report | Siasia 10'; Ikpeba 65'; N. Kanu 71' |

Pakhtakor Stadium, Tashkent
Attendance: 55,000
Referee: Ali Bujsaim (United Arab Emirates)

| Uzbekistan | Nigeria |

Uzbekistan:
| GK | 1 | Oleg Belyakov |
| DF | 2 | Andrei Zakharov |
| DF | 3 | Farkhad Magametov (c) |
| DF | 5 | Gennadi Denisov | (substituted off) 55' |
| DF | 18 | Andrei Fyodorov |
| MF | 4 | Mirdjalal Kasimov |
| MF | 6 | Ilkhom Sharipov |
| MF | 7 | Abdikakhor Marifaliev | (substituted off) 65' |
| MF | 8 | Sergey Lebedev | (substituted off) 75' |
| FW | 9 | Igor Shkvyrin |
| FW | 10 | Azamat Abduraimov |
Substitutes:
| MF | 15 | Dilmurod Nazarov | (substituted on) 55' |
| FW | 11 | Ravshan Bozorov | (substituted on) 65' |
| FW | 12 | Shukhrat Maksudov | (substituted on) 75' |
Manager:
Aleksandr Ivankov

Nigeria:
| GK | 1 | Alloysius Agu |
| DF | 2 | Augustine Eguavoen (c) |
| DF | 3 | Wasiu Ipaye |
| DF | 5 | Uche Okafor |
| DF | 6 | Taribo West |
| MF | 8 | Mutiu Adepoju |
| MF | 10 | Wilson Oruma | (substituted off) 60' |
| MF | 15 | Sunday Oliseh |
| FW | 7 | Samson Siasia |
| FW | 11 | Victor Ikpeba | (substituted off) 85' |
| FW | 14 | Daniel Amokachi |
Substitutes:
| DF | 12 | Pascal Ojigwe | (substituted on) 85' |
| FW | 4 | Nwankwo Kanu | (substituted on) 60' |
Manager:
(Netherlands) Jo Bonfrere

Assistant referees:
... ... (...)
... ... (...)
Fourth official:
... ... (...)

Man of the Match:
... ... (...)

=== Second leg ===
10 November 1995
--:-- UTC+1

| Nigeria | 1–0 | Uzbekistan |
|---|---|---|
| Amunike 82' | report |

National Stadium, Lagos
Attendance: 60,000
Referee: Sidi Bekaye Magassa (Mali)

| Nigeria | Uzbekistan |

Nigeria:
| GK | 1 | Alloysius Agu |
| DF | 2 | Augustine Eguavoen |
| DF | 3 | Celestine Babayaro |
| DF | 6 | Uche Okafor |
| DF | 5 | Uche Okechukwu |
| MF | 8 | Mutiu Adepoju | (substituted off) 60' |
| MF | 10 | Wilson Oruma |
| MF | 15 | Sunday Oliseh |
| FW | 7 | Finidi George |
| FW | 4 | Nwankwo Kanu (c) | (substituted off) 60' |
| FW | 14 | Daniel Amokachi | (substituted off) 46' |
Substitutes:
| MF | – | Jay-Jay Okocha | (substituted on) 60' |
| FW | 7 | Samson Siasia | (substituted on) 60' |
| FW | – | Emmanuel Amunike | (substituted on) 46' |
Manager:
(Netherlands) Jo Bonfrere

Uzbekistan:
| GK | – | Pavel Bugalo |
| DF | 2 | Andrei Zakharov |
| DF | 3 | Farkhad Magametov (c) |
| DF | – | Ulugbek Ruzimov | (substituted off) 80' |
| DF | – | Akmal Khashimov |
| MF | 4 | Mirdjalal Kasimov |
| MF | 6 | Ilkhom Sharipov |
| MF | 8 | Sergey Lebedev | (substituted off) 42' |
| FW | 10 | Azamat Abduraimov |
| FW | 11 | Ravshan Bozorov |
| FW | 12 | Shukhrat Maksudov | (substituted off) 46' |
Substitutes:
| DF | – | Bakhtiar Namazov | (substituted on) 80' |
| MF | 7 | Abdikakhor Marifaliev | (substituted on) 42' |
| MF | 15 | Dilmurod Nazarov | (substituted on) 46' |
Manager:
Aleksandr Ivankov

Assistant referees:
... ... (...)
... ... (...)
Fourth official:
... ... (...)

Man of the Match:
... ... (...)

== Winners ==
Nigeria won 4–2 on aggregates.

1995 Afro-Asian Cup of Nations

Nigeria
1st title
