= Football at the 1994 Asian Games =

- Venues: Regional Park Stadium; Hiroshima Stadium; Bingo Stadium; Miyoshi Athletic Stadium; Fukuyama Stadium; Hiroshima Big Arch
- Dates: 1–16 October
- Nations: 19

Medalists
gold medal	Uzbekistan (men); China (women)
silver medal	China (men); Japan (women)
bronze medal	Kuwait (men); Chinese Taipei (women)

Football at the 1994 Asian Games was held in Hiroshima, Japan from 1 to 16 October 1994. The Asian Football Confederation suggested that only under-23 teams should be entered, which meant that all the players had to be born after 1 January 1971. But this was ignored by all participants except Saudi Arabia.

The women's tournament doubled the Asian qualification of 1995 FIFA Women's World Cup in Sweden, where China and Japan qualified.

== Schedule ==
P	Preliminary round	¼	Quarterfinals	½	Semifinals	B	Bronze medal match	G	Gold medal match

Event↓/Date →	1st Sat	2nd Sun	3rd Mon	4th Tue	5th Wed	6th Thu	7th Fri	8th Sat	9th Sun	10th Mon	11th Tue	12th Wed	13th Thu	14th Fri	15th Sat	16th Sun
Men	P		P		P		P		P		¼		½		B	G
Women			P	P		P	P		P	P		G				

== Venues ==
Hiroshima			Fukuyama
Hiroshima Big Arch	Hiroshima Stadium	Regional Park Stadium	Fukuyama Stadium
Capacity: 50,000	Capacity: 13,800	Capacity: 10,000	Capacity: 10,081
Miyoshi	Football at the 1994 Asian Games is located in Hiroshima Prefecture		
Miyoshi Athletic Stadium	Football at the 1994 Asian Games is located in Hiroshima Prefecture		
Capacity: 10,000	Football at the 1994 Asian Games is located in Hiroshima Prefecture		
Onomichi	Football at the 1994 Asian Games is located in Hiroshima Prefecture		
Bingo Athletic Stadium	Football at the 1994 Asian Games is located in Hiroshima Prefecture		
Capacity: 9,245	Football at the 1994 Asian Games is located in Hiroshima Prefecture		

== Medalists ==
Event	Gold	Silver	Bronze
Men	Uzbekistan; Yuriy Sheykin; Fevzi Davletov; Andrei Fyodorov; Mirjalol Qosimov; Farkhad Magametov; Ilkhom Sharipov; Abdukahhor Marifaliev; Sergey Lebedev; Igor Shkvyrin; Azamat Abduraimov; Shukhrat Maqsudov; Rustam Durmonov; Abdusamat Durmonov; Ulugbek Ruzimov; Stepan Atayan; Berdakh Allaniyazov; Aleksandr Tikhonov	China; Xu Tao; Wei Kexing; Jiang Feng; Fan Zhiyi; Xu Hong; Li Bing; Wang Dongning; Gao Zhongxun; Wang Tao; Gao Feng; Xie Yuxin; Li Ming; Hu Zhijun; Li Xiao; Jin Guangzhu; Peng Weiguo; Cao Xiandong; Ou Chuliang	Kuwait; Hussain Al-Mekaimi; Ali Falah Sadoun; Khaled Jarallah; Yousef Al-Dokhi; Mohammad Al-Adwani; Wael Sulaiman; Naser Al-Sohi; Obaid Al-Shammari; Ali Marwi; Nawaf Jadid Al-Enezi; Bashir Salboukh; Fawaz Al-Ahmad; Abdullah Al-Dousari; Mohammad Edailem; Nawaf Al-Dhafairi; Ayman Al-Hussaini; Salamah Al-Enezi; Mansour Basha; Falah Al-Majidi; Khaled Al-Fadhli
Women	China; Cao Yao; Chen Yufeng; Fan Yunjie; Gu Pingjuan; Liu Ailing; Niu Lijie; Shi Guihong; Shui Qingxia; Sun Qingmei; Sun Wen; Wang Liping; Wei Haiying; Wen Lirong; Yu Hongqi; Zhao Lihong; Zhong Honglian; Zhou Hua; Zhou Yang	Japan; Etsuko Handa; Maki Haneta; Kaoru Kadohara; Futaba Kioka; Kyoko Kuroda; Tsuru Morimoto; Terumi Nagae; Kaori Nagamine; Akemi Noda; Shiho Onodera; Nami Otake; Junko Ozawa; Homare Sawa; Asako Takakura; Inesu Emiko Takeoka; Yumi Tomei; Tamaki Uchiyama; Rie Yamaki	Chinese Taipei; Chang Hsiu-ling; Chen Chu-chi; Chen Shu-chin; Chou Tai-ying; Hsu Chia-cheng; Hsu Ching-hsin; Huang Yu-chuan; Hung Mei-hsiu; Ko Chiao-lin; Lan Lan-fen; Lee Mei-chin; Lin Hui-fang; Lin Mei-chun; Lin Mei-jih; Shieh Su-jean; Wu Huey-shwu; Wu Min-hsun; Yeh Huei-chen

== Medal table ==
Rank	Nation	Gold	Silver	Bronze	Total
1	China (CHN)	1	1	0	2
2	Uzbekistan (UZB)	1	0	0	1
3	Japan (JPN)	0	1	0	1
4	Chinese Taipei (TPE)	0	0	1	1
4	Kuwait (KUW)	0	0	1	1
Totals (5 entries)		2	2	2	6

== Draw ==
The original draw for men's tournament was announced on 1 June 1994 as follows:

Group A

- Iran
- Uzbekistan
- Bahrain
- Oman
- Yemen

Group B

- Thailand
- United Arab Emirates
- Turkmenistan
- ~~India~~
- ~~Mongolia~~

Group C

- South Korea
- China
- ~~Kazakhstan~~
- ~~Indonesia~~

Group D

- Saudi Arabia
- Kuwait
- Hong Kong
- Nepal

Group E

- Japan
- Qatar
- Myanmar
- ~~Brunei~~

On 16 September a revised draw was announced, following some withdrawals. Two more entrants (Malaysia and Palestine) were included.

Group A

- Iran
- Yemen
- Bahrain
- Turkmenistan
- China

Group B

- Thailand
- Saudi Arabia
- Malaysia
- Hong Kong
- Uzbekistan

Group C

- South Korea
- Kuwait
- Oman
- Nepal
- ~~Palestine~~

Group D

- Japan
- Qatar
- Myanmar
- United Arab Emirates

However, Palestine then withdrew for financial reasons.

== Final standing ==
=== Men ===
Rank	Team	Pld	W	D	L	GF	GA	GD	Pts
1st place, gold medalist(s)	Uzbekistan	7	7	0	0	23	7	+16	21
2nd place, silver medalist(s)	China	7	5	1	1	16	8	+8	16
3rd place, bronze medalist(s)	Kuwait	6	4	1	1	15	6	+9	13
4	South Korea	6	3	0	3	17	7	+10	9
5	Saudi Arabia	5	3	0	2	9	10	−1	9
6	Turkmenistan	5	1	3	1	9	8	+1	6
7	Japan	4	1	2	1	9	5	+4	5
8	United Arab Emirates	4	1	2	1	6	5	+1	5
9	Iran	4	1	2	1	5	2	+3	5
10	Bahrain	4	1	2	1	6	5	+1	5
11	Oman	3	1	1	1	4	4	0	4
12	Malaysia	4	1	1	2	6	11	−5	4
13	Qatar	3	0	3	0	5	5	0	3
14	Hong Kong	4	1	0	3	6	8	−2	3
15	Thailand	4	0	1	3	8	12	−4	1
16	Myanmar	3	0	1	2	2	9	−7	1
17	Yemen	4	0	0	4	0	14	−14	0
18	Nepal	3	0	0	3	0	20	−20	0

=== Women ===
Rank	Team	Pld	W	D	L	GF	GA	GD	Pts
1st place, gold medalist(s)	China	4	3	1	0	10	1	+9	10
2nd place, silver medalist(s)	Japan	4	2	1	1	9	3	+6	7
3rd place, bronze medalist(s)	Chinese Taipei	3	1	0	2	2	8	−6	3
4	South Korea	3	0	0	3	0	9	−9	0
