= 1993 Uzbek League =

Uzbek League
- Season: 1993
- Champions: Neftchi Farg'ona
- Relegated: Dinamo Samarqand; Kushon Kosonsoy
- Top goalscorer: Rustam Durmonov Neftchi Farg'ona (26 goals)

The 1993 Uzbek League season was the second edition of top level football in Uzbekistan since independence from the Soviet Union in 1992. Neftchi Farg'ona once again won the league and the championship outright this time after previously sharing with Pakhtakor Tashkent the season before.

On winning the championship, Nefchi also qualified for the next edition of the AFC Champions League, the first time a club side from Uzbekistan would play in AFC competitions. They would also enter the 1994 Commonwealth of Independent States Cup a competition for former members of the Soviet Union.

Pakhtakor Tashkent won the 1993 Uzbek Cup and would take their place in the 1994–95 Asian Cup Winners' Cup.

Dinamo Samarqand and Kushon Kosonsoy were relegated.

== Teams ==
Shahrixonchi Shahrixon, Kimyogar Olmaliq and Surxon Termiz were relegated to the Uzbekistan 1-Division in the 1992 season campaign and were replaced by Shifokor Guliston and Politotdel Tashkent.

During the off season, three teams decided to change name:

- Kosonsoychi Kosonsoy changed name to Kushon Kosonsoy
- Maroqand Samarqand changed name to Dinamo Samarqand
- Pakhtakor-79 Toshkent changed name to MHSK Tashkent.

== League standings ==
Pos	Team	Pld	W	D	L	GF	GA	GD	Pts	Qualification or relegation
1	Neftchi Farg'ona	30	24	4	2	83	27	+56	52	Qualification to 1994–95 Asian Club Championship and 1994 Commonwealth of Independent States Cup
2	Pakhtakor Tashkent	30	20	7	3	74	29	+45	47	Qualification to 1994–95 Asian Cup Winners' Cup
3	Navbahor Namangan	30	18	7	5	64	32	+32	43	
4	Sogdiana Jizzakh	30	16	8	6	47	31	+16	40	
5	Nurafshon Buxoro	30	15	5	10	46	32	+14	35	
6	Temiryo'lchi Qo'qon	30	13	5	12	36	34	+2	31	
7	Navro'z Andijan	30	11	8	11	43	41	+2	30	
8	MHSK Tashkent	30	9	9	12	38	50	−12	27	
9	Politotdel Tashkent	30	12	2	16	52	52	0	26	
10	Traktor Tashkent	30	10	6	14	25	38	−13	26	
11	Aral Nukus	30	11	3	16	37	55	−18	25	
12	Yangiyer	30	9	6	15	34	44	−10	24	
13	Chirchiq	30	8	5	17	43	57	−14	21	
14	Shifokor Guliston	30	8	3	19	37	76	−39	19	
15	Kushon Kosonsoy	30	6	7	17	33	57	−24	19	Relegation to Uzbekistan 1-Division
16	Dinamo Samarqand	30	6	3	21	22	59	−37	15	Relegation to Uzbekistan 1-Division

== Match results ==
	1	2	3	4	5	6	7	8	9	10	11	12	13	14	15	16
1. Neftchi Farg'ona		2:1	3:2	3:0	3:1	1:0	3:1	4:1	4:0	2:0	4:0	5:1	5:2	6:1	3:1	4:0
2. Pakhtakor Tashkent	5:4		3:2	3:3	2:0	2:0	1:0	6:1	4:1	3:0	5:1	3:0	2:2	6:1	1:0	2:0
3. Navbahor Namangan	0:0	2:1		0:0	1:0	2:1	3:2	1:0	4:2	3:0	3:0	3:1	3:2	5:0	5:0	5:0
4. Sogdiana Jizzakh	1:1	0:1	3:1		1:0	1:0	0:0	0:0	2:1	3:1	3:0	2:0	3:0	3:0	1:0	2:0
5. Nurafshon Buxoro	2:0	0:0	3:2	1:0		2:2	2:1	4:0	1:0	1:1	4:1	1:0	1:0	8:1	4:1	3:1
6. Temiryo'lchi Qo'qon	1:3	1:1	1:1	0:0	4:0		3:1	2:1	2:1	1:0	2:1	2:1	1:0	3:1	3:1	1:0
7. Navro'z Andijan	1:2	1:1	0:0	3:1	0:1	2:0		0:0	2:1	1:1	3:2	2:0	2:1	4:0	2:0	2:0
8. MHSK Tashkent	1:1	1:3	1:1	3:3	1:0	1:0	3:3		1:2	0:3	1:3	1:0	3:2	1:0	3:2	5:1
9. Politotdel Tashkent	1:4	0:2	0:2	3:4	1:1	1:0	2:0	0:4		2:1	5:1	4:0	0:1	6:0	4:1	3:0
10. Traktor Tashkent	0:3	0:2	2:0	1:2	1:0	3:2	0:0	1:2	1:0		2:0	1:0	2:1	1:0	0:1	1:0
11. Aral Nukus	2:3	2:0	1:2	4:0	1:0	1:0	3:1	2:0	1:1	1:1		1:0	2:3	1:0	3:0	1:0
12. Yangiyer	0:3	1:1	1:1	1:4	3:1	1:0	4:1	0:0	2:0	0:0	3:0		4:1	4:1	1:1	2:0
13. Chirchiq	1:2	2:3	2:3	2:1	0:1	3:0	3:5	1:1	2:1	4:0	1:1	1:0		3:3	1:1	2:1
14. Shifokor Guliston	1:1	2:2	2:4	1:2	2:0	0:1	3:1	2:0	1:2	1:0	4:0	1:2	2:0		3:1	1:0
15. Kushon Kosonsoy	0:1	0:3	1:1	1:1	1:3	1:2	1:1	1:0	3:6	1:1	2:0	0:0	3:0	6:1		2:1
16. Dinamo Samarqand	0:3	0:5	0:2	0:1	1:1	1:1	0:1	2:2	1:2	2:0	2:1	3:2	1:0	3:2	2:0	

== Top scorer ==
#	Footballer	Club	Goals
1	(Uzbekistan) Rustam Durmonov	FC Neftchi Fergana	24
2	(Uzbekistan) Oleg Shatskikh	FC Dustlik	17
3	(Uzbekistan) Shukhrat Maqsudov	Pakhtakor Tashkent FK	15
