= Islom Ismoilov =

Uzbek football manager

Islombek Ismoilov
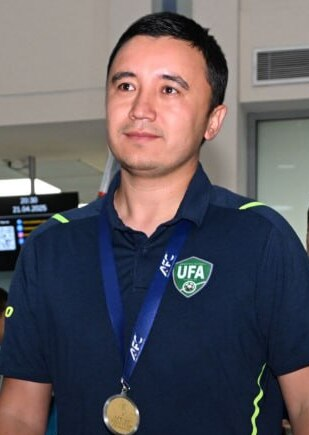

Personal information
- Date of birth: July 19, 1992 (age 34)
- Place of birth: Margilan, Uzbekistan

Team information
- Current team: Neftchi (head coach)

Youth career
- Years: Team
- —2011: Pakhtakor

Managerial career
- 2015—2018: Yozyovon
- 2018: Iftixor
- 2018—2019: Farovon BFK
- 2019—2021: Turon
- 2021: Turon U21
- 2022: Uzbekistan U-14
- 2023: Uzbekistan U-15
- 2024: Uzbekistan U-16
- 2025: Uzbekistan U-17
- 2025: Neftchi U21
- 2025—: Neftchi

Islom Ismoilov (Uzbek: Islombek Murodbek o‘g‘li Ismoilov; born 19 July 1992, Margilan, Fergana Region, Uzbekistan) is an Uzbek association football coach, and current head coach of Neftchi Fergana football club.

== Biography ==
Islombek Ismoilov was born on July 19, 1992, in Margilan, and has studied at the Pakhtakor football school.

=== Coaching career ===
Ismoilov began his professional coaching career in 2015 at the Yozyovon club in the Fergana Region. Over three seasons, he served as head coach of FC Yozyovon Lochinlari. In 2018 season, he worked as head coach of Iftixor Oltiariq.

In 2019, he was appointed head coach of Turon Yaypan. Under his leadership, Turon won the 2019 Uzbekistan Pro-B League. In 2021 Uzbekistan Super League, following unsatisfactory results, he was dismissed from the head coach position and was appointed head coach of Turon U21 team. In November 2021, he was also dismissed from the U21 team.

In 2022, he was appointed head coach of the Uzbekistan national under-14 team. In 2023 and 2024, he coached the Uzbekistan U-15 and U-16 national teams. Since 2024, he has been the head coach of the Uzbekistan U-17 national team. On 26 June 2025, he signed a contract with Neftchi and was appointed head coach of the club's U21 team. On 1 December, he was appointed head coach of Neftchi.

== Personal life ==
Islombek's father, Murod Ismoilov, is a former footballer and football coach. His younger brother, Muzaffar Muzaffarov, is also a footballer and plays in the Bangladesh championship.

== Honours ==
=== As a coach ===
- Uzbekistan Pro League winner: 2020
- Uzbekistan B-Pro League winner: 2019
- AFC U-17 Asian Cup winner: 2025

=== Awards ===
In 2025, he was awarded the title "Honored Sports Coach of the Republic of Uzbekistan".
