= Augustine Eguavoen =

Nigerian footballer and manager

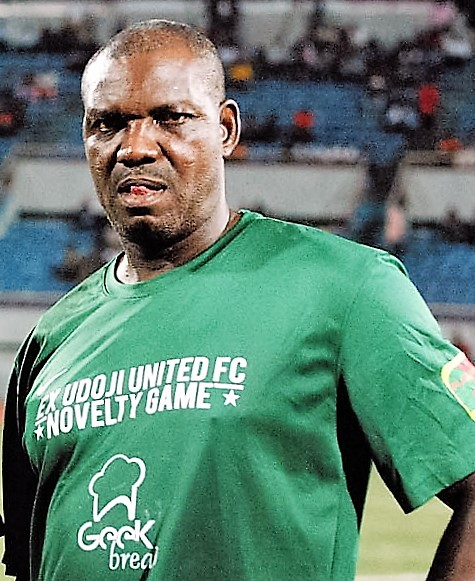
- Augustine Eguavoen as the Nigeria National Team Manager

Personal information
- Full name: Augustine Owen Eguavoen
- Date of birth: 19 August 1965 (age 61)
- Place of birth: Sapele, Nigeria
- Height: 1.91 m (6 ft 3 in)
- Position: Centerback

Senior career*
Years	Team	Apps	(Gls)
1985–1986	ACB Lagos		
1986–1990	Gent	77	(10)
1990–1994	Kortrijk	95	(7)
1994–1995	Ourense	10	(0)
1995–1996	Kortrijk	27	(1)
1996	Sacramento Scorpions		
1997–1998	Torpedo Moscow	25	(1)
1999–2001	Sliema Wanderers	5	(0)

International career
1987–1998	Nigeria	49	(1)

Managerial career
- 1999: Sliema Wanderers (player-coach)
- 2002: Bendel Insurance
- 2002–2003: Nigeria U20
- 2005–2007: Nigeria
- 2008: Black Leopards
- 2008–2009: Enyimba International
- 2010: Nigeria (caretaker)
- 2010–2011: Nigeria U23
- 2012–2013: Sharks
- 2013: COD United
- 2014: Bendel Insurance
- 2014–2016: Gombe United
- 2017: Sunshine Stars
- 2018: Zakynthos
- 2020–2021: Stade Malien
- 2020–2025: Nigeria (Technical Director)
- 2021–2022: Nigeria (interim)
- 2024–2025: Nigeria (interim)
- 2026–: Nigeria Women (interim)
Medal record
Men's football
Representing Nigeria (as manager)
Africa Cup of Nations
Bronze medal – third place	2006
- * Club domestic league appearances and goals

Augustine Owen Eguavoen (born 19 August 1965) is a Nigerian football manager and former player who served as manager of the Nigeria national team three times. He currently is the interim manager of the Nigeria women's national football team.

== Club career ==
Eguavoen began his playing career with ACB Lagos in 1985. In 1986, he moved to Belgium to join Gent, where he played until 1990. He then transferred to Kortrijk, where he remained until 1994. During his time at Kortrijk, he established himself as a regular defender in the Belgian First Division.

In 1994, he joined Ourense in Spain, playing in the Segunda División. He subsequently returned to Kortrijk, where he played through the 1995–96 season.

In 1996, Eguavoen played for the Sacramento Scorpions in the United States. In 1997, he moved to Torpedo Moscow in Russia, where he played in the country's top division from 1997 to 1998.

In 1999, he joined Sliema Wanderers in Malta. During the 1999–2000 season, he was part of the team that won the Maltese FA Trophy and the Maltese Super Cup, and subsequently served as a player-manager. He retired from playing at the end of the 2000–01 season and thereafter focused on coaching.

== International career ==
Eguavoen made his debut for the Nigeria national football team on 4 July 1987 against the Sierra Leone in the 1988 African Cup of Nations qualification. He also participated in the 1988 Summer Olympics qualification that year. At the 1988 Africa Cup of Nations, he made four appearances and helped Nigeria finish as runners-up. He also participated in the 1988 Summer Olympics tournament.

In March 1994, at the 1994 Africa Cup of Nations in Tunisia, Eguavoen played in Nigeria's group-stage matches against the Gabon and Egypt. Nigeria defeated Gabon 3–0 and drew 0–0 with Egypt to finish top of the group and advance to the quarter-finals. In the quarter-final against Zaire, Eguavoen captained Nigeria, who won 2–0 with two goals from Rashidi Yekini.

In the semi-final against the Ivory Coast, Nigeria drew 2–2 after extra time before winning 4–2 on penalties to reach the final. Eguavoen also played in the match. In the final, Nigeria faced Zambia. After conceding the opening goal to Elijah Litana, Nigeria came from behind to win 2–1, with Emmanuel Amunike scoring twice. Nigeria therefore won its second Africa Cup of Nations title, following its first title in 1980. Eguavoen also played in the final.

Eguavoen subsequently played as a regular defender for Nigeria at the 1994 FIFA World Cup. At the tournament in the United States, he started in the group-stage matches against Bulgaria and Argentina, as well as in the round-of-16 match against Italy. Nigeria finished top of its group and advanced to the round of 16, where it lost 2–1 to Italy after extra time.

In 1995, he participated in the 1995 King Fahd Cup, appearing in all three of Nigeria's matches against Japan, Argentina, and Mexico. In the same year, he played in both legs of the 1995 Afro-Asian Cup of Nations against Uzbekistan.

In 1997, Eguavoen played against Guinea in the 1998 FIFA World Cup qualification, helping Nigeria qualify for the World Cup. At the 1998 FIFA World Cup in France, he started Nigeria's group-stage match against Paraguay. It was his final appearance for the national team. Nigeria were eliminated in the round of 16 after a 4–1 defeat to Denmark.

Eguavoen represented Nigeria from 1987 to 1998, making 49 appearances and scoring one goal.

== Coaching career ==
=== Sliema Wanderers ===
Eguavoen began his coaching career in Malta with Sliema Wanderers, he was given the job as player-coach for the 1999–2000 season, but lasted in that role for only few months. He kept playing for Sliema in the 2000–01 season.

=== Nigeria ===
Eguavoen was appointed the caretaker coach of the Nigeria national team in June 2005 with his coaching staff including Samson Siasia, Daniel Amokachi and Ike Shorunmu. He managed the Nigeria national team at the 2006 Africa Cup of Nations in Egypt, where the team won a bronze medal, beating Senegal in the third-place play-off. He was sacked in April 2006.

=== Black Leopards ===
Eguavoen then moved to South Africa, to take over Premier Soccer League side Black Leopards in March 2008.

=== Enyimba International ===
In the 2008–09 season, Eguavoen was head coach at Enyimba International in Aba, however he left soon after, leading them to a 3rd-place finish in league and winning the Federation Cup.

=== Return to Nigeria ===
In June 2010, the Nigeria Football Federation asked Eguavoen to replace Swedish Lars Lagerbäck until he decide his future plans. He was brought in as caretaker manager but said that he has no intention of submitting an application to take the role on a permanent basis. Eguavoen was also appointed as the head coach of the Nigeria national under-23 football team in August 2010. He expected his team would have a qualification for the 2012 London Olympic Games, but they were knocked out in the group stage. On 5 December 2011, he resigned from his job following the failure to secure the Olympics ticket.

On 27 October 2012, he was named manager of Sharks F.C. to allow John Obuh to concentrate on the Nigeria Under-20 team. He resigned however after seven games when the team started at the bottom of the table. He signed in April 2013 to coach Nigeria National League side COD United.

In November 2013, he was hired by the Edo State government to coach Bendel Insurance with the intent of getting them back to the Premier League. He resigned in July 2014 to take over Gombe United F.C.

In April 2017, he joined Sunshine Stars. but was let go in June after a home loss to league leaders Plateau United.

In October 2020, the Nigerian Football Federation, appointed Eguavoen as the Technical Director of the Federation.

On 12 December 2021, Eguavoen was appointed manager of Nigeria on an interim basis for the 2021 Africa Cup of Nations, following the departure of Gernot Rohr. After Nigeria exited from the round of sixteen with an agonising defeat to Tunisia, he returned to his position as the Technical Director of the side.

== Honours ==
=== As a Player ===
Nigeria

- Africa Cup of Nations: 1994

=== As a Coach ===
Nigeria

- Africa Cup of Nations third place: 2006 (Bronze)

Enyimba International

- Nigeria Federation Cup: 2008–09 Season
