= Albert Tsarayev =

Russian footballer and coach

Personal information
- Full name: Albert Sulikovich Tsarayev
- Date of birth: 13 December 1967 (age 58)
- Place of birth: Ordzhonikidze, Russian SFSR
- Height: 1.76 m (5 ft 9 1/2 in)
- Positions: Midfielder; forward

Senior career*
Years	Team	Apps	(Gls)
1988–1989	FC Surkhan Termez	44	(14)
1989–1990	FC Pakhtakor Tashkent	19	(2)
1990–1991	FC Surkhan Termez	29	(10)
1991–1992	FC Dynamo Stavropol	44	(15)
1992–1993	FK Neftchi Farg'ona	47	(25)
1993–1995	FC Spartak Anapa	78	(22)
1995–1996	FC Kuban Krasnodar	15	(3)
1996–1997	BFC Siófok	20	(1)
1997–1998	FC Anapa	17	(10)
1998–1999	FC Volgar-Gazprom Astrakhan	14	(3)
1999–2000	FC KAMAZ-Chally Naberezhnye Chelny	28	(11)

Managerial career
- 2001: FC Spartak Anapa
- * Club domestic league appearances and goals

Albert Sulikovich Tsarayev (Russian: Альберт Суликович Цараев; born 13 December 1967) is a Russian professional football coach and a former player.

== Personal life ==
His son Alan Tsarayev is also a football player.
