= Samson Siasia =

Nigerian footballer and coach

Personal information
- Date of birth: 14 August 1967 (age 59)
- Place of birth: Lagos, Nigeria
- Height: 1.80 m (5 ft 11 in)
- Position: Striker

Senior career*
Years	Team	Apps	(Gls)
1982–1984	Julius Berger		
1985–1986	Flash Flamingoes		
1987	El-Kanemi Warriors		
1987–1993	Lokeren	151	(31)
1993–1995	Nantes	40	(4)
1995–1996	Tirsense	15	(0)
1996–1997	Al-Hilal		
1997–1998	Perth Glory	22	(3)
1998–2000	Zafririm Holon	30	(12)
Total		258	(50)

International career
1984–1998	Nigeria	49	(17)

Managerial career
- 2005–2007: Nigeria U-20
- 2007–2010: Nigeria U-23
- 2010–2011: Nigeria
- 2012–2013: Durgapur Vox Champion
- 2016: Nigeria
- 2016: Nigeria U-23
- * Club domestic league appearances and goals

Samson Siasia (born 14 August 1967) is a Nigerian former professional football striker and the former head coach of the Nigeria national team from 2010 to October 2011. He was reappointed in 2016.

On 16 August 2019, FIFA banned Siasia from all football activities for life (later reduced to five years), following a match-fixing investigation. The adjudicatory chamber of FIFA’s independent Ethics Committee stated in 2019 that the former Nigerian coach had accepted "that he would receive bribes in relation to the manipulation of matches in violation of the FIFA Code of Ethics".

== Playing career ==
=== Club ===
At club level, Siasia most notably played for French team FC Nantes where he became league champion in 1994–95. He also played for Australian club Perth Glory with fellow Nigerian Peter Anosike, as well as in Belgium, Portugal, Saudi Arabia and Israel.

=== International ===
He played 49 international matches for Nigeria, in which he scored 17 goals, and was part of the team that participated in the 1994 FIFA World Cup and won the 1994 African Nations Cup. He was also a member of the Nigerian team that won bronze at 1992 African Nations Cup in Senegal. He participated in the national team over a period of 14 years and was recognized in Nigeria as the third leading scorer for the national team.

== Honours ==
In November 2009, the main field at the Yenagoa Township Stadium was named in his honor.

== Coaching career ==
In 2005, Samson Siasia coached the under 20 team (Flying Eagles), taking them to the finals of both the 2005 Under-20 World Cup and the U-20 African Youth Championship. He won the African Youth Championship and advanced all the way to the world final – before losing to Argentina 2–1. He also assisted Augustine Eguavoen in coaching the national team.

Samson Siasia was appointed national U-23 coach in January 2007. In 2008, he coached the Nigerian Under-23 Olympic squad to the final against Argentina. In a superbly played series of matches, Nigeria's team earned the Olympic Silver Medals. Earlier in 2008, the U-23 team won the inaugural Intercontinental Cup in Malaysia. This team was composed entirely of domestic Nigerian players and won the Cup against many teams headed for the 2008 Summer Olympics. In addition to his position as head coach of the Under 23 Olympic Eagles, he developed a youth academy in the capital city Abuja, called SiaOne Soccer Academy. On 17 March 2009, he was reappointed as the head coach of the under-20 team after the finished a disappointing 3rd in the 2009 African Youth Championship. He received a six-month contract to coach Heartland F.C. in July 2010. On 4 November 2010, he was named as the national team coach to succeed Swedish Lars Lagerbäck. He was fired on 28 October 2011 for failing to take the Nigeria team to the 2012 African Nations Cup in Gabon & Equatorial Guinea.

Siasia was one of the five foreign managers auctioned in February 2012 for the new Bengal Premier League Soccer. His former national teammate, Jay-Jay Okocha, was bought by the same club from the five icon players up for auction. On 26 February 2016, he was named by the Nigeria Football Federation (NFF) as the Chief Coach of the Nigeria national team, the Super Eagles, to be assisted by Salisu Yusuf, Emmanuel Amunike and Alloysius Agu after the resignation of Sunday Oliseh from the position.

He returned to the U-23 post in 2015 and led Nigeria to the Rio Olympics. In February 2017 he was one of a number of managers on the shortlist for the vacant Rwanda national team manager role.

In April 2018 he was one of 77 applicants for the vacant Cameroon national team job.

== Corruption allegation ==
In August 2019 he was handed a lifetime ban by FIFA related to match fixing. He said he would appeal but was in no rush to do so. In June 2021, Siasia's appeal at the Court of Arbitration for Sport earned him a reduction of the suspension to five years and the cancellation of the additional fine of 50,000 Swiss francs ($54,000).
