= Alan Tsarayev =

Russian footballer

Personal information
- Full name: Alan Albertovich Tsarayev
- Date of birth: 1 June 1999 (age 27)
- Place of birth: Anapa, Russia
- Height: 1.77 m (5 ft 10 in)
- Position: Midfielder

Team information
- Current team: FC Rotor Volgograd
- Number: 22

Youth career
- FC Krasnodar
- PFC CSKA Moscow

Senior career*
Years	Team	Apps	(Gls)
2017	FC Afips-2 Afipsky		
2017	FC Anapa (amateur)		
2017–2019	FC Spartak Vladikavkaz	39	(2)
2019–2024	FC Alania Vladikavkaz	104	(5)
2024–2026	FC Arsenal Tula	55	(4)
2026–	FC Rotor Volgograd	0	(0)
- * Club domestic league appearances and goals as of 16 May 2026

Alan Albertovich Tsarayev (Russian: Алан Альбертович Цараев; born 1 June 1999) is a Russian football player who plays for FC Rotor Volgograd.

== Club career ==
He made his debut in the Russian Football National League for FC Alania Vladikavkaz on 1 August 2020 in a game against FC SKA-Khabarovsk, he substituted Alan Khugayev in the 55th minute.

== Personal life ==
His father Albert Tsarayev also played football professionally.
