= Andrei Fyodorov (footballer) =

Uzbekistani footballer (born 1971)

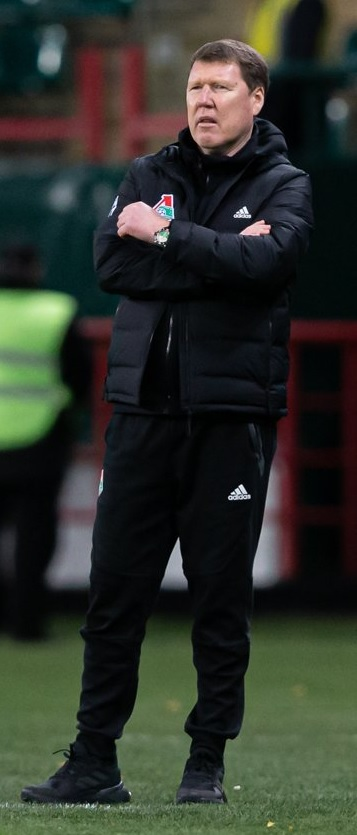
- Andrei Fyodorov coaching Lokomotiv Moscow in 2022

Personal information
- Full name: Andrei Vitalyevich Fyodorov
- Date of birth: 10 April 1971 (age 55)
- Place of birth: Fergana, Uzbek SSR, Soviet Union
- Height: 1.85 m (6 ft 1 in)
- Position: Defender

Team information
- Current team: Rubin-2 Kazan (manager)

Senior career*
Years	Team	Apps	(Gls)
1989–1991	Avtomobilist Kokand	44	(2)
1992–1997	Neftchi Farg'ona	138	(38)
1998–1999	Spartak Alania	42	(1)
1999	Baltika	14	(0)
2000–2008	Rubin Kazan	127	(15)

International career
1994–2006	Uzbekistan	65	(7)

Managerial career
- 2012–2013: Rubin Kazan reserve (head coach)
- 2014–2015: Neftchi Farg'ona (assistant coach)
- 2015–2017: Neftchi Farg'ona
- 2018–2020: Lokomotiv Tashkent
- 2018: Uzbekistan (assistant coach)
- 2021–2022: Kazanka Moscow
- 2022: Lokomotiv Moscow (caretaker)
- 2024: Rubin-2 Kazan (assistant)
- 2024–2025: Akhmat Grozny (assistant)
- 2025–2026: Rubin-2 Kazan (assistant)
- 2026–: Rubin-2 Kazan
Medal record
Men's football
Representing Uzbekistan
Asian Games
Gold medal – first place	1994 Hiroshima
Afro-Asian Cup of Nations
Runner-up	1995 Uzbekistan-Nigeria
- * Club domestic league appearances and goals

Andrei Vitalyevich Fyodorov or Fedorov (Russian: Андрей Витальевич Фёдоров; born 10 April 1971) is a football coach and a former player who works as a manager with Rubin-2 Kazan. A defender, he is a former Uzbekistani international. He is a naturalized Russian citizen.

== Club career ==
Fyodorov started his professional career in Soviet Second League club Avtomobilist Kokand. In 1992–1995 he played for Neftchi Farg'ona and won four Uzbek League champion titles. After playing for Alania Vladikavkaz in 1998–1999 and Baltika he moved to Rubin Kazan. Fyodorov played for Rubin in 2000–2008. In 2008, he won Russian Premier League with Rubin.

== International career ==
Fyodorov was member of Uzbekistan team participating in 1994 Asian Games in Hiroshima. Uzbekistan won 1994 Asian Games. He capped 64 matches for the national team, scoring 7 goals.

== Managerial career ==
Fyodorov finished playing career in Rubin and in 2008 was selected as director of club's scouting department. In 2012–2013 he was head coach of Rubin reserve squad.

In 2014, he moved to Neftchi Farg'ona and joined club's coaching staff as assistant coach. After Murod Ismoilov resigned Fyodorov was appointed as head coach on 15 September 2015.

On 13 October 2022, Fyodorov was appointed caretaker manager of Lokomotiv Moscow. His caretaking spell ended on 13 November 2022 with the hiring of Mikhail Galaktionov. Lokomotiv won one league game out of 5 that Fyodorov managed.

== Career statistics ==
=== Club ===
Last update: 29 November 2008

Season	Team	Country	Division	Apps	Goals
1989	Avtomobilist Kokand	Uzbekistan	2	8	0
1990	Avtomobilist Kokand	Uzbekistan	2	0	0
1991	Avtomobilist Kokand	Uzbekistan	2	36	2
1992	Neftchi Farg'ona	Uzbekistan	1	?	?
1993	Neftchi Farg'ona	Uzbekistan	1	?	?
1994	Neftchi Farg'ona	Uzbekistan	1	?	?
1995	Neftchi Farg'ona	Uzbekistan	1	?	?
1996	Neftchi Farg'ona	Uzbekistan	1	?	?
1997	Neftchi Farg'ona	Uzbekistan	1	?	?
1998	Alania Vladikavkaz	Russia	1	28	0
1999	Alania Vladikavkaz	Russia	1	14	1
1999	Baltika Kaliningrad	Russia	1	14	0
2000	Rubin Kazan	Russia	2	31	9
2001	Rubin Kazan	Russia	2	11	0
2002	Rubin Kazan	Russia	2	17	3
2003	Rubin Kazan	Russia	1	17	1
2004	Rubin Kazan	Russia	1	10	2
2005	Rubin Kazan	Russia	1	15	0
2006	Rubin Kazan	Russia	1	14	0
2007	Rubin Kazan	Russia	1	11	0
2008	Rubin Kazan	Russia	1	1	0

=== International ===
#	Date	Venue	Opponent	Score	Result	Competition
1.	21 October 1995	Pakhtakor Markaziy Stadium, Tashkent, Uzbekistan	Nigeria	2–3	Loss	1995 Asia-Africa Cup
2.	25 May 1997	Pakhtakor Markaziy Stadium, Tashkent, Uzbekistan	Cambodia	6–0	Win	1998 FIFA World Cup qual.
3.	7 September 1997	Tokyo Olympic Stadium, Tokyo, Japan	Japan	6–3	Loss	1998 FIFA World Cup qual.
4.	18 October 1997	Pakhtakor Markaziy Stadium, Tashkent, Uzbekistan	South Korea	1–5	Loss	1998 FIFA World Cup qual.
5.	25 October 1997	Pakhtakor Markaziy Stadium, Tashkent, Uzbekistan	Kazakhstan	4–0	Win	1998 FIFA World Cup qual.
6.	3 December 1998	700th Anniversary Stadium, Chiang Mai, Thailand	Kuwait	3–3	Draw	1998 Asian Games
7.	24 November 1999	Tahnoun bin Mohammed Stadium, Abu Dhabi, UAE	India	3–2	Win	2000 AFC Asian Cup qual.
Correct as of 2 January 2017

== Honours ==
Neftchi Farg'ona

- Uzbek League: 1992, 1993, 1994, 1995; Runner-up, 1996, 1997
- Uzbek Cup: 1994, 1996

Rubin Kazan

- Russian Football National League: 2002
- Russian Premier League: 2008

Uzbekistan

- Asian Games: Gold Medalist, 1994
- Afro-Asian Cup of Nations: Runner-up, 1995

Individual

- Uzbekistan Coach of the Year third place: 1997
