= Stepan Atayan =

Uzbek football player (born 1966)

Personal information
- Date of birth: 13 July 1966 (age 60)
- Place of birth: Baku, Azerbaijan SSR, Soviet Union
- Height: 1.73 m (5 ft 8 in)
- Position: Midfielder

Team information
- Current team: Proodeftiki (assistant manager)

Youth career
- 1976–1984: Neftchi Baku PFK

Senior career*
Years	Team	Apps	(Gls)
1989–1991	Köpetdag Aşgabat	93	(6)
1991	Sogdiana Jizzakh	8	(0)
1992	Temiryulchi Qoqon	25	(3)
1993–1997	Neftchi Farg'ona	93	(30)
1997–1999	Proodeftiki		
1999–2000	Chalkidona	7	(1)
2000–2001	Atromitos	8	(0)

International career
1995–1996	Uzbekistan	9	(0)

Managerial career
- 2024: Proodeftiki
- * Club domestic league appearances and goals

Stepan Atayan (Russian: Степан Атаян; born 13 July 1966) is a retired Uzbek international football player who played as a midfielder and was awarded in 1993 as one of the three Best Footballers of the Year. He is currently the assistant manager at Proodeftiki in Greece.

== Club career ==
Atayan began playing football in the Soviet Second League with Neftchi Baku PFK and Köpetdag Aşgabat. He joined Uzbek League side Neftchi Farg'ona in 1991. Atayan left Uzbekistan and moved to Greece in 1995. He continued his career with Proodeftiki, playing 4 seasons for the club in the Super League Greece. He joined Chalkidona F.C. in 1999, where he won 2 cups. He finished his football career in Atromitos in 2001.

== International ==
He was on the Uzbekistani squad at the 1994 Asian Games and made his full debut for Uzbekistan on 18 July 1995 at Merdeka Cup against Hungary won 3:2 by Hungary. Atayan made 9 appearances for the Uzbekistan national football team, including three appearances at the 1996 AFC Asian Cup finals in the United Arab Emirates.

== Managerial career ==
After finishing his football career, Atayan continued with a coaching career. He possesses both the AFC coaching diploma and the UEFA category B coaching license diploma in Greece. He began coaching professionally youth football academy U13, U15, U17, U19. Afterwards, he coached in various football teams including Copa Renti SC owned by Nikos Karoulias in 2001–2004, Fostiras F.C. in 2004–2005, Kallithea B League in 2011–2012, Proodeftiki in 2012–2013.

== Personal life ==
He got married in 1988, had a daughter (Diana) in 1990 and a son (Arsen) in 1994.

== Honours ==
=== Club ===
Neftchi Farg'ona

- Uzbek League (3): 1992, 1993, 1994
- Uzbek Cup (2): 1994, 1996

=== Individual ===
- Uzbekistan Footballer of the Year 3rd: 1993
