= Abdusamad Durmonov =

Soviet and Uzbekistani footballer (1965–2026)

Personal information
- Full name: Abdusamad Charshanbiyevich Durmonov
- Date of birth: 15 November 1965
- Place of birth: Termez, Uzbek SSR, Soviet Union
- Date of death: 3 May 2026 (aged 60)
- Place of death: Fergana, Uzbekistan
- Height: 1.65 m (5 ft 5 in)
- Position: Midfielder

Senior career*
Years	Team	Apps	(Gls)
1982–1984	Avtomobilist Termez	64	(7)
1985–1986	Lokomotiv Chita	45	(3)
1987	Surkhon Termez	22	(7)
1987–1989	Pakhtakor Tashkent	64	(3)
1990–1991	Surkhon Termez	72	(19)
1992–2002	Neftchi Fergana	274	(15)
Total		541	(54)

International career
1992–1994	Uzbekistan	7	(0)

Managerial career
- 2003–2014: Neftchi Fergana (assistant)
- 2015: Yozyovon Lochinlari
- 2015–2017: Neftchi Fergana (assistant)
- 2017: Surkhon Termez
- 2017–2019: Neftchi Fergana (assistant)
- 2019–2020: Neftchi Fergana (interim)
- 2021: Istiqlol
- 2022–2024: FarDU (assistant)
Medal record
Men's football
Representing Uzbekistan
Football at the Asian Games
Gold medal – first place	1994 Japan
- * Club domestic league appearances and goals

Abdusamad Charshanbiyevich Durmonov (Uzbek: Abdusamat Chorshanba oʻgʻli Doʻrmonov Абдусамат Чоршанбиевич Дўрмонов, Russian: Абдусамат Чаршанбиевич Дурманов; 15 November 1965 – 3 May 2026) was a Soviet and Uzbekistani football player and manager.

== Club career ==
Born in Termez, Durmonov started his career at Avtomobilist Termez. Prior to the fall of the Soviet Union, he played for Avtomobilist Termez, Lokomotiv Chita, Surkhon Termez, and Pakhtakor Tashkent. In 1992, he joined Neftchi Fergana, where he played 274 matches and won five Uzbekistan Super League titles before retiring in 2002.

In 1999, an RSSSF poll ranked Durmonov as the 44th best footballer in the world.

== International career ==
Durmonov made seven appearances for the Uzbekistan national team between 1992 and 1994. He was part of Uzbekistan's squad at the 1994 Asian Games in Japan, where he played in the final to help them win a gold medal. Thanks to their gold medal win, he, alongside the rest of the team, were awarded the Shukhrat Medal.

== Managerial career ==
Following his retirement in 2002, he moved to coaching. He worked as an assistant manager at Neftchi between 2003 and 2014, before becoming the manager of Yozyovon Lochinlari in 2015. Following his stint at Yozyovon Lochinlari, he returned to working as an assistant manager at Neftchi, taking over as interim manager between 2019 and 2020.

== Personal life and death ==
Two of his brothers, Rustam and Ravshan, were also footballers, with Rustam playing for the Uzbekistan national team between 1992 and 2000.

Durmonov died on 3 May 2026, at the age of 60, with his death being announced by the Uzbekistan Football Association.

== Honours ==
Neftchi Fergana

- Uzbekistan Super League: 1992 (tied with Pakhtakor), 1993, 1994, 1995 2001
- Uzbekistan Cup: 1994, 1996

Uzbekistan

- Football at the Asian Games gold medalist: 1994

Individual

- Shukhrat Medal: 1994
