= Mukhtor Kurbonov =

Uzbekistani footballer and coach

Personal information
- Date of birth: 26 January 1975 (age 51)
- Place of birth: Kokand, Uzbek SSR
- Position: Midfielder

Team information
- Current team: Shurtan Guzar (head coach)

Senior career*
Years	Team	Apps	(Gls)
1992–1993	Temiryo'lchi Qo'qon	72	(17)
1995–1997	MHSK Tashkent	87	(38)
1998	Navbahor Namangan	26	(7)
1999–2000	Dustlik	62	(25)
2001	Pakhtakor	23	(4)
2002	Neftchi Farg'ona	15	(9)
2002–2003	Dustlik	30	(15)
2003	Kairat	15	(1)
2004	Yassy Sayram	24	(3)
2005	Zhetysu	10	(3)
2005–2006	Metallurg Bekabad	27	(8)
2006	Qizilqum Zarafshon	12	(5)
2007	Traktor Tashkent	8	(1)
2007	Shurtan	13	(3)
2008	Sogdiana Jizzakh	27	(0)
2009–2010	Khorezm Urgench	29	(0)
2012	Olmaliq	2	(0)

International career
1997–2001	Uzbekistan	15	(0)

Managerial career
- 2014–: Shurtan Guzar
- * Club domestic league appearances and goals

Mukhtor Kurbonov (Uzbek: Мухтор Қурбонов; born 26 January 1975) is a former Uzbek professional footballer and coach. He is currently coach of Shurtan. As a player he played in position of midfielder.

== Playing career ==
He started his playing career in Temiryo'lchi Qo'qon in 1992. After playing 3 seasons in Kokand, he moved to MHSK Tashkent where he won Oliy League in 1997. In 1999–2000 he played for Dustlik and twice won Oliy League titles and Uzbek Cup in 2000 with club. He also played for several Kazakhstani clubs: Kairat (2003), Yassy Sayram (2004) and Zhetysu (2005).

Kurbonov played for Uzbekistan and was part of team in the 2000 Asian Cup. Kurbonov capped totally 15 matches for national team. With 152 goals, he is member of Gennadi Krasnitsky club. In total, he scored 133 goals in Oliy League matches for different clubs.

== Managing career ==
On 8 January 2015, he started coaching in Shurtan Guzar.

== Honours ==
=== Club ===
Temiryo'lchi

- Uzbek Cup runner-up: 1992

MHSK Tashkent

- Uzbek League (1): 1997
- Uzbek Cup runner-up: 1995

Navbahor

- Uzbek Cup (1): 1998

Dustlik

- Uzbek League (2): 1999, 2000
- Uzbek Cup (1): 2000

Pakhtakor

- Uzbek Cup (1): 2001

Kairat

- Kazakhstan Cup (1): 2003

=== Individual ===
- Gennadi Krasnitsky club: 152 goals
