= Sergey Lebedev (footballer) =

Uzbekistani footballer

Personal information
- Full name: Sergey Elefertovich Lebedev
- Date of birth: 31 January 1969 (age 57)
- Place of birth: Fergana, Uzbek SSR, Soviet Union
- Height: 1.76 m (5 ft 9 1/2 in)
- Position: Midfielder

Team information
- Current team: Istiqlol Fergana (coach)

Senior career*
Years	Team	Apps	(Gls)
1985–1987	FC Turbina Naberezhnye Chelny	55	(8)
1988	Dynamo Kirov	3	(0)
1989	Neftyanik Fergana	3	(0)
1989	Dynamo Kirov	39	(8)
1990–1991	Neftyanik Fergana	54	(7)
1992–1999	Neftchi Farg'ona	196	(60)
1999	Shinnik Yaroslavl	2	(0)
2000–2001	Nasaf Qarshi	50	(0)
2002–2004	Neftchi Farg'ona	58	(6)
2004	Sogdiana Jizzakh	11	(1)
2005	Metallurg Bekabad	10	(0)
2006	Neftchi Farg'ona	2	(0)

International career
1994–2000	Uzbekistan	33	(10)

Managerial career
- 201?–: Neftchi Farg'ona (assistant)
- 2017–: Istiqlol Fergana (coach)
- * Club domestic league appearances and goals

Sergey Elefertovich Lebedev (Russian: Сергей Элефертович Лебедев; born 31 January 1969) is a retired football midfielder. Lebedev is a former Uzbekistani international, who obtained a total number of 33 caps during his career, scoring ten goals. He later became a football coach.

== Playing career ==
Lebedev started playing professionally in Turbina Naberezhnye Chelny in 1985. He completed 3 seasons for Turbina and wento to FC Dynamo Kirov in 1988. In 1989–91 he played for Neftyanik Fergana and in 1990 he won Soviet Second League with the club and was promoted to Soviet First League. In 1992–1999 he played for Neftchi Farg'ona and won 4 times Uzbekistani championship and two Uzbek Cups. He became Neftchi's best League goalscorer in the 1996 and 1998 seasons. His last club played was also Neftchi Farg'ona. He joined the club in 2006 after playing for Metallurg Bekabad in 2005.

== International ==
Lebedev capped 33 matches, scoring 10 goals for national team. He was one of the player of Uzbekistan who won Asian Games in 1994. He scored two goals in Asian Games 1994. Lebedev scored his second goal in Final match against China on 8-minute as Uzbekistan after that began leading 2:0. He also participated in 2 AFC Asian Cups: 1996 AFC Asian Cup and 2000 AFC Asian Cup.

== Managing career ==
After getting retired in 2006, he started his managing career at club level. He started to work as assistant coach to Yuriy Sarkisyan in Neftchi Farg'ona. He remained in club coaching stuff when Yuriy Sarkisyan was sacked in May 2013.

== International goals ==
No.	Date	Venue	Opponent	Score	Result	Competition
1.	1 October 1994	Hiroshima, Japan	Saudi Arabia	1–0	4–1	1994 Asian Games
2.	16 October 1994	Hiroshima, Japan	China	2–0	4–2	1994 Asian Games
3.	12 December 1996	Al Ain, UAE	Syria	1–1	1–2	1996 AFC Asian Cup
4.	25 May 1997	Tashkent, Uzbekistan	Cambodia	3–0	6–0	1998 FIFA World Cup qualification
5.	25 May 1997	Tashkent, Uzbekistan	Cambodia	6–0	6–0	1998 FIFA World Cup qualification
6.	19 November 1998	Kolkata, India	India	2–0	4–0	Friendly
7.	5 December 1998	Chiang Mai, Thailand	Mongolia	1–0	15–0	1998 Asian Games
8.	5 December 1998	Chiang Mai, Thailand	Mongolia	4–0	15–0	1998 Asian Games
9.	5 December 1998	Chiang Mai, Thailand	Mongolia	9–0	15–0	1998 Asian Games
10.	5 December 1998	Chiang Mai, Thailand	Mongolia	10–0	15–0	1998 Asian Games

== Honours ==
=== Club ===
Neftchi

- Soviet Second League, East conference (1): 1990
- Uzbek League (4): 1992, 1993, 1994, 1995
- Uzbek Cup (2): 1994, 1996
- Asian Club Championship 3rd: 1995
- CIS Cup runners-up: 1994

=== International ===
- Asian Games champion: 1994

=== Individual ===
- Neftchi League Top goalscorer (2): 1996 (13 goals), 1998 (18 goals)
