= 1994–95 Asian Club Championship =

14th edition of premier club football tournament organized by the AFC

1994–1995 Asian Club Championship
Tournament details
- Dates: 10 August 1994 – 29 January 1995
- Teams: 27
- Venue: Bangkok (final round)

Final positions
- Champions: (Thailand) Thai Farmers Bank FC (2nd title)
- Runners-up: (Qatar) Al-Arabi
- Third place: (Uzbekistan) FK Neftchy Farg'ona
- Fourth place: (South Korea) Ilhwa Chunma

Tournament statistics
- Matches played: 52
- Goals scored: 197 (3.79 per match)

The 1994–95 Asian Club Championship was the 14th edition of the annual international club football competition held in the AFC region (Asia). It determined that year's club champion of association football in Asia.

Thai Farmers Bank FC from Thailand crowned Asian champion for the second consecutive year.

== Preliminary round ==
=== Central Asia ===
Team	Pld	W	D	L	GF	GA	GD	Pts	Qualification
(Uzbekistan) FK Neftchy Farg'ona (H)	4	4	0	0	17	1	+16	12	Advance to First Round
(Turkmenistan) Köpetdag Aşgabat	4	3	0	1	11	3	+8	9	
(Kazakhstan) Ansat Pavlodar	4	1	0	3	4	6	−2	3	
(Tajikistan) Sitora Dushanbe	4	1	0	3	4	15	−11	3	
(Kyrgyzstan) Alga Bishkek	4	1	0	3	2	13	−11	3	

(H) Hosts
10 August 1994

Ansat Pavlodar (Kazakhstan)	0–2	(Turkmenistan) Kopetdag Asgabat

Margilan, Uzbekistan
10 August 1994

FK Neftchy Farg'ona (Uzbekistan)	9–0	(Kyrgyzstan) Alga Bishkek

Fergana, Uzbekistan
11 August 1994

Kopetdag Asgabat (Turkmenistan)	7–1	(Tajikistan) Sitora Dushanbe

Margilan, Uzbekistan
11 August 1994

FK Neftchy Farg'ona (Uzbekistan)	3–0	(Kazakhstan) Ansat Pavlodar

Fergana, Uzbekistan
13 August 1994

Ansat Pavlodar (Kazakhstan)	4–0	(Tajikistan) Sitora Dushanbe

Margilan, Uzbekistan
13 August 1994

Kopetdag Asgabat (Turkmenistan)	1–0	(Kyrgyzstan) Alga Bishkek

Fergana, Uzbekistan
14 August 1994

FK Neftchy Farg'ona (Uzbekistan)	2–1	(Turkmenistan) Kopetdag Asgabat

Fergana, Uzbekistan
14 August 1994

Sitora Dushanbe (Tajikistan)	3–1	(Kyrgyzstan) Alga Bishkek

Margilan, Uzbekistan
16 August 1994

FK Neftchy Farg'ona (Uzbekistan)	3–0	(Tajikistan) Sitora Dushanbe

Fergana, Uzbekistan
16 August 1994

Ansat Pavlodar (Kazakhstan)	0–1	(Kyrgyzstan) Alga Bishkek

Margilan, Uzbekistan

=== South Asia ===
Team	Pld	W	D	L	GF	GA	GD	Pts	Qualification
(India) Mohun Bagan (H)	2	2	0	0	12	2	+10	6	Advance to First Round
(Maldives) Club Valencia	2	1	0	1	3	8	−5	3	
(Sri Lanka) Ratnam SC	2	0	0	2	2	7	−5	0	

(H) Hosts

Pakistan did not send a team.

1994

Mohun Bagan (India)	7–1	(Maldives) Club Valencia

Salt Lake Stadium, Calcutta, India
1994

Mohun Bagan (India)	5–1	(Sri Lanka) Ratnam SC

Salt Lake Stadium, Calcutta, India
1994

Club Valencia (Maldives)	2–1	(Sri Lanka) Ratnam SC

Salt Lake Stadium, Calcutta, India

=== South-East Asia ===
Team	Pld	W	D	L	GF	GA	GD	Pts	Qualification
(Brunei) Kota Ranger (H)	0	0	0	0	0	0	0	0 (Note: Results unknown)	Advance to First Round
Negro Rubro Macau	0	0	0	0	0	0	0	0	
(Philippines) Davao City	0	0	0	0	0	0	0	0	

(H) Hosts
Notes:

All matches were played in Bandar Seri Begawan, Brunei, from 26 to 30 August 1994.

== First round ==
=== West Asia ===
Team 1	Agg.	Team 2	1st leg	2nd leg
Kazma SC (Kuwait)	2–2 (a)	(Qatar) Al-Arabi	2–1	0–1
Saipa (Iran)	bye			
Mirbat (Oman)	bye			
West Riffa (Bahrain)	bye			
Al-Ansar (Lebanon)	bye			
Al-Wasl (United Arab Emirates)	bye			
FK Neftchy Farg'ona (Uzbekistan)	bye			
Al-Shabab (Saudi Arabia)	bye			

Note: the Jordanian FA did not send a team, while (Yemen) Al-Ahli withdrew before the draw.

=== East Asia ===
Team 1	Agg.	Team 2	1st leg	2nd leg
Ilhwa Chunma (South Korea)	10–4	(Malaysia) Kedah FA	5–3	5–1
Kota Ranger (Brunei)	2–12	(Hong Kong) Eastern AA	1–6	1–6
Club Valencia (Maldives)	5–9	(Thailand) Bangkok Bank of Commerce	3–4	2–5
Thai Farmers Bank (Thailand)	bye			
Mohun Bagan (India)	bye			
Verdy Kawasaki (Japan)	bye			
Pelita Jaya (Indonesia)	bye			
Liaoning FC (China)	bye			

Note: Bangkok Bank withdrew before the draw, with the Thai FA sending Bangkok Bank of Commerce as its replacement representative.

== Second round ==
=== West Asia ===
Team 1	Agg.	Team 2	1st leg	2nd leg
Al-Shabab (Saudi Arabia)	3–3 (4–5p)	(Lebanon) Al-Ansar	3–0	0–3
Al-Arabi (Qatar)	9–4	(Oman) Mirbat	5–0	4–4
Saipa (Iran)	3–3 (a)	(Uzbekistan) FK Neftchy Farg'ona	2–2	1–1
West Riffa (Bahrain)	3–3 (3–4p)	(United Arab Emirates) Al-Wasl	2–1	1–2

=== East Asia ===
Team 1	Agg.	Team 2	1st leg	2nd leg
Thai Farmers Bank (Thailand)	7–0	(India) Mohun Bagan	4–0	3–0^{1}
Eastern AA (Hong Kong)	4–6	(Japan) Verdy Kawasaki	1–2	3–4
Pelita Jaya (Indonesia)	1–5	(South Korea) Ilhwa Chunma	0–1	1–4
Liaoning FC (China)	4–2	(Thailand) Bangkok Bank of Commerce	4–1	0–1

^{1} The AFC ordered that the 2nd leg was to be played in Malaysia due to a plague pandemic in India, but Mohun Bagan objected to the ruling and refused to travel; they were ejected from the competition, fined $3000 and banned from AFC competitions for three years.

== Quarterfinals ==
=== West Asia ===
Team	Pld	W	D	L	GF	GA	GD	Pts	Qualification
(Uzbekistan) FK Neftchy Farg'ona	3	1	1	1	6	4	+2	4	Advance to Semi-finals
(Qatar) Al-Arabi (H)	3	1	1	1	3	3	0	4	Advance to Semi-finals
(United Arab Emirates) Al Wasl FC	3	1	1	1	4	6	−2	4	
(Lebanon) Al-Ansar	3	0	3	0	4	4	0	3	

(H) Hosts

All matches were played in Doha, Qatar.

Al Arabi (Qatar)	1–2	(United Arab Emirates) Al-Wasl

FK Neftchy Farg'ona (Uzbekistan)	2–2	(Lebanon) Al-Ansar

FK Neftchy Farg'ona (Uzbekistan)	4–1	(United Arab Emirates) Al-Wasl

Al Arabi (Qatar)	1–1	(Lebanon) Al-Ansar

Al Arabi (Qatar)	1–0	(Uzbekistan) FK Neftchy Farg'ona

Al Wasl (United Arab Emirates)	1–1	(Lebanon) Al-Ansar

=== East Asia ===
Team	Pld	W	D	L	GF	GA	GD	Pts	Qualification
(South Korea) Ilhwa Chunma (H)	3	3	0	0	7	2	+5	9	Advance to Semi-finals
(Thailand) Thai Farmers Bank FC	3	0	2	1	2	3	−1	2	Advance to Semi-finals
(China) Liaoning FC	3	0	2	1	3	5	−2	2	
(Japan) Verdy Kawasaki	3	0	2	1	1	3	−2	2	

(H) Hosts

All matches were played at Changwon Sports Park in Changwon, South Korea.

20 November 1994

Ilhwa Chunma (South Korea)	3–1	(Japan) Verdy Kawasaki
Lee Gi-beom 8', 18'; Shin Tae-yong 36'		Yoshinori Abe 64'

Changwon Sports Park, Changwon, South Korea
22 November 1994

Ilhwa Chunma (South Korea)	3–1	(China) Liaoning FC
Lee Sang-yoon 15', 40'; Ha Seong-jun 55'

Changwon Sports Park, Changwon, South Korea
24 November 1994

Ilhwa Chunma (South Korea)	1–0	(Thailand) Thai Farmers Bank
Park Nam-yeol 29'

Changwon Sports Park, Changwon, South Korea

Liaoning FC (China)	2–2	(Thailand) Thai Farmers Bank

Changwon Sports Park, Changwon, South Korea

Verdy Kawasaki (Japan)	0–0	(Thailand) Thai Farmers Bank

Changwon Sports Park, Changwon, South Korea

Verdy Kawasaki (Japan)	0–0	(China) Liaoning FC

Changwon Sports Park, Changwon, South Korea

== Knockout Stage ==
=== Bracket ===
Semi-finals
27 January – Bangkok
(South Korea) Ilhwa Chunma	0
(Qatar) Al-Arabi	2
27 January – Bangkok
(Uzbekistan) FK Neftchy Farg'ona	2 (2)
(Thailand) Thai Farmers Bank (p)	2 (3)

Final
29 January – Bangkok
(Qatar) Al-Arabi	0
(Thailand) Thai Farmers Bank	1
Third place play-off
29 January – Bangkok
(South Korea) Ilhwa Chunma	0
(Uzbekistan) FK Neftchy Farg'ona	1

=== Semi-finals ===
27 January 1995

Ilhwa Chunma (South Korea)	0–2	(Qatar) Al-Arabi

Supachalasai National Stadium, Bangkok

27 January 1995

FK Neftchy Farg'ona (Uzbekistan)	2–2 (a.e.t.)	(Thailand) Thai Farmers Bank
Penalties
	2–3

Supachalasai National Stadium, Bangkok

=== Third placed play-off ===
29 January 1995

Ilhwa Chunma (South Korea)	0-1	(Uzbekistan) FK Neftchy Farg'ona
		Ravshan Bozorov 66' (pen.)

Supachalasai National Stadium, Bangkok

=== Final ===
29 January 1995

Al-Arabi (Qatar)	0–1	(Thailand) Thai Farmers Bank
		Natipong Sritong-In 82'

Supachalasai National Stadium, Bangkok
