= Ulugbek Ruzimov =

Uzbek footballer (1968–2017)

Personal information
- Full name: Ulugbek Ikramovich Ruzimov
- Date of birth: 15 August 1968
- Place of birth: Tashkent, Uzbek SSR, Soviet Union
- Date of death: 8 May 2017 (aged 48)
- Height: 1.83 m (6 ft 0 in)
- Position: Defender

Senior career*
Years	Team	Apps	(Gls)
1989–1990	Pakhtakor Tashkent		
1991	Umid Toshkent		
1992	Navbahor Namangan		
1994–1996	Pakhtakor Tashkent		
2001	Metalourg Bekabad		

International career
1992–1996	Uzbekistan	23	(2)
- * Club domestic league appearances and goals

Ulugbek Ikramovich Ruzimov (15 August 1968 – 8 May 2017) was an Uzbek footballer who played as a defender for Uzbekistani international. He obtained a total number of 23 caps during his career, scoring two goals.

== Sources ==
- Ulugbek Ruzimov at National-Football-Teams.com
- RSSSF
