= Dilmurod Nazarov =

Uzbekistani footballer

Personal information
- Date of birth: 12 April 1976 (age 50)
- Place of birth: Tashkent, Uzbekistan
- Height: 1.70 m (5 ft 7 in)
- Position: Midfielder

Senior career*
| Years | Team | Apps | (Gls) |
| 1992–1993 | Pakhtakor Tashkent | 15 | (0) |
| 1993 | SKIF-Ordabasy | 1 | (0) |
| 1995–1998 | Pakhtakor Tashkent | 115 | (45) |
| 1999 | Traktor Tashkent | 11 | (4) |
| 1999 | Sintez Shymkent | 5 | (2) |
| 2000 | Pakhtakor Tashkent | 6 | (1) |
| 2001 | Surkhon Termez | 4 | (1) |
| 2001 | Taraz Dzhambul | 24 | (4) |
| 2002 | Kaysar Kyzylorda | 28 | (6) |
| 2003 | Taraz Dzhambul | 24 | (10) |
| 2004 | Yassi Sayram | 28 | (5) |
| 2005 | Kaysar Kyzylorda | 28 | (6) |
| 2005 | Ordabasy | 12 | (2) |
| 2006 | Navbahor Namangan | 9 | (3) |

International career
| 1995–1997 | Uzbekistan | 10 | (0) |
- * Club domestic league appearances and goals

Dilmurod Nazarov is a former Uzbekistani football midfielder who played for Uzbekistan.

== Career ==
He started played professionally from 1992 in Pakhtakor. In 1992–1994, 1995–1998 and 2000 played for Pakhtakor. He won with Pakhtakor several Oliy League champion titles and Uzbek Cups. In 1995, he was named by UFF after journalist's survey one of the 3 players for award Uzbekistan Footballer of the Year. He ranked 2nd after Oleg Shatskikh.

After 1998 he played mostly for Kazakhstani clubs in Kazakhstan Premier League. In 2006, he moved back to Oliy League club Navbahor Namangan after playing for Ordabasy.

== International ==
He capped totally 10 matches for Uzbekistan national team. Nazarov played in the 1996 Asian Cup.

== Honours ==
=== Club ===
Pakhtakor

- Uzbek League (2): 1992, 1998
- Uzbek Cup (2): 1993, 1997

=== Individual ===
- Uzbekistan Footballer of the Year 2nd: 1995
