= Ilkhom Sharipov =

Uzbekistani footballer (born 1968)

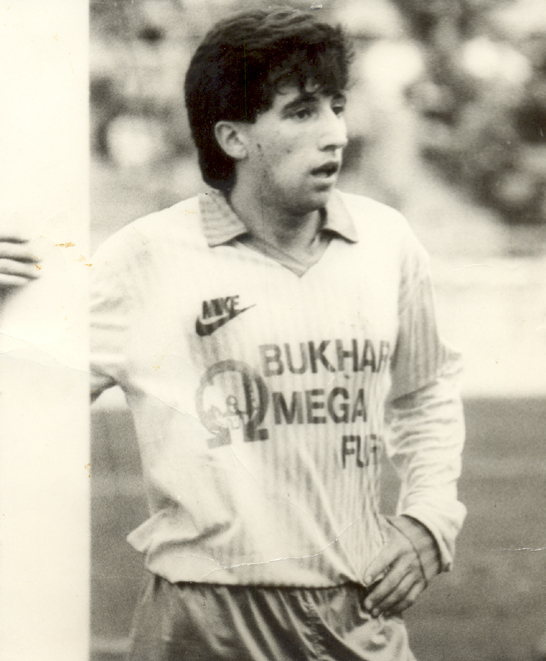

Personal information
- Date of birth: 24 February 1968 (age 58)
- Place of birth: Namangan, Uzbekistan
- Position: Defender

Team information
- Current team: Dinamo Samarqand (manager)

Senior career*
Years	Team	Apps	(Gls)
1986—1987	Dinamo Samarqand	35	(7)
1987	Pakhtakor	12	(0)
1988—1989	Dinamo Samarqand	67	(13)
1990—1995	Pakhtakor	145	(15)
1996—1998	Navbahor Namangan	61	(12)
1999—2000	Dinamo Samarqand	31	(5)
2001	FC Dustlik	6	(2)
2002	Esil Bogatyr	11	(0)
2002—2004	Dinamo Samarqand	36	(5)

International career
1992–1998	Uzbekistan	31	(1)

Managerial career
- 2016–: Dinamo Samarqand
- * Club domestic league appearances and goals

Ilkhom Sharipov is a former Uzbekistan football Defender and football coach.

== Career ==
Sharipov played the most of his career in Pakhtakor. He also played for Uzbekistan in the 1996 Asian Cup.

== Managing career ==
In March 2016 Sharipov was appointed as head coach of Dinamo Samarqand which had been relegated to the First League during the 2015 Uzbek League season.

== Honours ==
=== Club ===
- Uzbek League (3): 1992, 1996, 2001
- Uzbek League runner-up (1): 1993
- Uzbek Cup (1): 1993
- Uzbekistan Super Cup (1): 1999

=== International ===
- Asian Games (1): 1994

=== Individual ===
- Shuhrat medal (Medal of Honor)
