= Shukhrat Maqsudov =

Uzbekistani footballer (born 1970)

Shukhrat Maqsudov Шухрат Максудов
Personal information
- Date of birth: 14 September 1970 (age 56)
- Place of birth: Fergana, Uzbek SSR, Soviet Union
- Position: Forward

Senior career*
Years	Team	Apps	(Gls)
1988	Pakhtakor Tashkent		
1989	SKA-RShVSM Angren		
1991–1996	Pakhtakor Tashkent		
1997–2000	FK Neftchi		

International career
1992–1997	Uzbekistan	21	(11)

Managerial career
- 2001–?: FK Neftchi (assistant coach)
- 2011–: Uzbekistan (assistant coach)
- 2013–2015: Uzbekistan U22
- 2021–2022: FC Bunyodkor
- * Club domestic league appearances and goals

Shukhrat Maqsudov (born 14 September 1970) is an Uzbekistani former footballer who played as a forward for Pakhtakor and FK Neftchi in the Uzbek League. For the Uzbekistan national team, he scored 11 goals in 21 appearances.

== Club career ==
Maqsudov was born in Uzbekistan and started his professional career at local Angren club, Tashkent Province. 1991 he moved to Pakhtakor and started to play first for reserve team of the club and later for main team. In 1993 season Pakhtakor finished runner-up after Neftchi Farg'ona and Maqsudov became third best top scorer of season, scoring 15 goals in league matches. In 1997, he moved to FK Neftchi, where he finished his football career as player. After he worked as coach in FK Neftchi.

== International career ==
Shukhrat Maqsudov belongs to the golden generation of Uzbekistan national team, which won Asian Games 1994. In final match Uzbekistan won China with 4:2 and Maqsudov scored last goal of uzbek side.

== Managerial career ==
Maqsudov started his coaching career in 2001 at Neftchi Farg'ona as assistant coach to Yuriy Sarkisyan. He participated in 2011 AFC Asian Cup as assistant trainer to Vadim Abramov with Uzbekistan national team. After Vadim Abramov was sacked, Maqsudov remained assistant coach of national team to Mirjalol Qosimov. On 6 December 2013 he was named by UFF as head coach of Uzbekistan U-22 to prepare team for 2014 AFC U-22 Championship in Oman.

On 14 February 2015 he was sacked from Uzbekistan U-23 coach position.

== Honours ==
- Uzbek League: 1992; runner-up (6) 1993, 1996, 1997, 1998, 1999, 2000
- Uzbek Cup runner-up: 1996, 1997, 2001, 2002, 2005

Uzbekistan

- Asian Games: 1994

Individual

- Uzbek League Top Scorer third place: 1993 (15 goals)
- Gennadi Krasnitsky club: 123 goals
