= Rustam Durmonov =

Uzbekistani footballer (born 1969)

Rustam Do'rmonov
Personal information
- Date of birth: 28 January 1969 (age 57)
- Place of birth: Fergana, Uzbek SSR, Soviet Union
- Height: 1.77 m (5 ft 10 in)
- Position: Forward

Senior career*
Years	Team	Apps	(Gls)
1985–1989	Surkhon Termez	89	(14)
1990–1991	Neftyanik Fergana	80	(25)
1992–1994	Neftchi Farg'ona	73	(53)
1995	Pakhtakor	20	(5)
1996–1997	Neftchi Farg'ona	55	(37)
1999–2000	Navbahor Namangan	25	(12)
2000–2002	Neftchi Farg'ona	69	(12)

International career
1992–2000	Uzbekistan	14	(2)
- * Club domestic league appearances and goals

Rustam Durmonov (Uzbek: Rustam Do'rmonov or Рустам Дўрмонов; born 28 January 1969) is an Uzbek footballer.

== Career ==
Durmonov played in Surkhon Termez in Soviet Second League from 1985 to 1989. He joined Neftyannik Fergana in 1990. In 1992–1994, he became three times Uzbekistan champion with Neftchi Farg'ona.

The most time of career Durmonov played for Neftchi, scoring 116 goals for the club in Uzbek League matches. Totally he scored 133 goals in league matches for different clubs.

== International ==
He made his debut in the national team on 17 June 1992 in friendly match against Tajikistan. He played 14 matches and scored 2 goals.

== Personal life ==
Two of his brothers, Abdusamad and Ravshan, were also footballers, with Abdusamad playing for the Uzbekistan national team between 1992 and 1994.

== Honours ==
=== Club ===
- Uzbek League (4): 1992, 1993, 1994, 2001
- Uzbek Cup (2): 1992, 1996

=== International ===
- Asian Games: 1994

=== Individual ===
- Uzbekistan Footballer of the Year 2nd: 1993
- Uzbek League Top Scorer: 1993 (26 goals)
- Gennadi Krasnitsky club: 172 goals
