= Alloysius Agu =

Nigerian footballer (born 1967)

Alloy Agu
Personal information
- Full name: Alloysius Uzoma Agu
- Date of birth: 12 July 1967 (age 59)
- Place of birth: Lagos, Nigeria
- Height: 1.79 m (5 ft 10 in)
- Position: Goalkeeper

Senior career*
Years	Team	Apps	(Gls)
1982–1989	NEPA		
1990	ACB Lagos		
1990–1992	MVV	45	(0)
1992–1994	RFC Liège	18	(0)
1994–1997	Kayserispor	79	(0)

International career
1988–1995	Nigeria	28	(0)

Managerial career
- 2021-2022: Nigeria (Goalkeeper coach)
- 2023-: Nigeria (Goalkeeper coach)
- * Club domestic league appearances and goals

Alloysius "Alloy" Uzoma Agu (born 12 July 1967 in Lagos) is a Nigerian retired footballer who played as a goalkeeper.

== Club career ==
Agu started his career in Nigerian football with NEPA, ACB Lagos and BCC Lions before he moved to Europe to join Eredivisie side MVV, whom he helped staying in the top tier. He played 45 matches for the club before moving south of the border and play for Belgian side Club Luik. He later played in Turkey, then went to North America where an injury cut short his career.

== International career ==
Their number one choice in the early nineties, he played 28 international matches for the Nigeria national team. He was the starting goalkeeper in the 1990 African Nations Cup where the team finished as runners-up and was brought to the 1994 FIFA World Cup and the 1994 African Nations Cup as a cover for Peter Rufai. Agu retired at the age of 30, after having spent most of his career in Africa.

He has served as the goalkeeping coach for Enyimba and in April 2008 was named goalkeeper coach for the national team.
