= Farkhad Magametov =

Uzbekistani footballer (born 1962)

Personal information
- Full name: Farkhad Abdualiyevich Magametov
- Date of birth: 11 January 1962 (age 64)
- Place of birth: Tashkent, Uzbek SSR, Soviet Union
- Position: Defender

Senior career*
Years	Team	Apps	(Gls)
1981	Pakhtakor Tashkent		
1984	FK Dinamo Samarqand		
1985–1987	Pakhtakor Tashkent		
1988	Meliorator Kzyl-Orda		
1989	Yoshlik Jizzakh		
1990	Sogdiana Jizzakh		
1990–1992	Pakhtakor Tashkent		
1994–1996	Navbahor Namangan		

International career
1992–1996	Uzbekistan	20	(0)
- * Club domestic league appearances and goals

Farkhad Abdualiyevich Magametov (Uzbek: Farhod Abdualiyevich Magometov; born 11 January 1962) is an Uzbekistani former footballer who played as a defender. He is a former Uzbekistan national team player, having obtained a total number of 20 caps during his career.

== Club career ==
Magametov started his career in 1981 for Pakhtakor Tashkent. He played one season at the Soviet Higher League level and collected 27 matches as a defender.

== International career ==
Magametov made his debut for the Uzbekistan national team in a friendly match against Kyrgyzstan on 23 August 1992. Two years later, he competed at the 1994 Asian Games, which his team won. He was a major players for the team, playing every match. He played many positions including left-back, right-back, centre-back as well defensive midfielder due to his decent pass technique.

On 19 June 1996, Magametov participated in the second match against Tajikistan. His team won 5–0 and advanced to the Asian Cup, on goal advantage. At this tournament Magametov was named the captain of the national team. It was the first Asian Cup for their country, held in the United Arab Emirates. He showed strong defensive abilities during the winning match against China. It was historical first win at the Asian Cup, but Uzbekistan failed to advance to the second round due to two losses against Syria and Japan.

He retired shortly after this tournament and was named Uzbekistan's second best football player in the same year.
