= Ravshan Bozorov =

Uzbekistani footballer (born 1968)

Personal information
- Date of birth: 10 May 1968 (age 58)
- Place of birth: Fergana, Uzbek SSR, Soviet Union
- Height: 1.76 m (5 ft 9 in)
- Position: Forward

Senior career*
Years	Team	Apps	(Gls)
1985–1989	Surkhon Termiz	95	(28)
1990–1991	Pamir Dushanbe	41	(4)
1991	Neftyanik Fergana	12	(1)
1992–1994	Neftchi Farg'ona	85	(46)
1995–1996	Pakhtakor	53	(29)
1997	Neftchi Farg'ona	25	(19)
1998–2002	Dynamo Samarkand	91	(51)
2002	Mash'al Mubarek	13	(9)
2003	Lokomotiv Tashkent	??	(19)
2004–2005	Tupolang Sariosiyo	24	(53)
2006–2007	Lokomotiv Tashkent	27	(9)
2007	Navbahor Namangan	1	(0)

International career
1992–1997	Uzbekistan	26	(5)

Managerial career
- 2009–2010: FK Dinamo Samarqand (assistant)
- 2011: Lokomotiv Tashkent (assistant)
- 2012–2014: Lokomotiv Tashkent (youth team)
- 2014–2016: NBU Osiyo
- 2016: Navbahor Namangan
- * Club domestic league appearances and goals

Ravshan Bozorov (born 10 May 1968) is an Uzbekistani football coach and former player. He played as a forward. Bozorov is one of the best top goalscorers in the history of uzbek football with 316 goals in all tournaments and various leagues.

== Playing career ==
Bozorov started his career in 1985 at Surkhon Termiz which played one of the regional zones of Soviet Second League. Bozorov played from 1986 to 1989 for Surkhon. In 1990–1991 he played for Pamir Dushanbe in Soviet Top League. In 2004, he became best goalscorer of Tupolang Sariosiyo with 44 goals and gained promotion to the top division with his club. Bozorov scored in his next season in Tupolang 9 goals, playing in Uzbek League.

During his career he played for many clubs from various divisions. Only in top Uzbek League he played in over 300 matches and scored over 170 goals. He is member of the "Club 200 of Berador Abduraimov" founded 2001 by initiative of Uzbekistan Football Federation, club of the best goalscorers in uzbek football with over 200 goals. Ravshan Bozorov completed in his career of 20 football seasons and scored 316 goals.

== Managerial career ==
Bozorov started his managing career at FK Dinamo Samarqand in 2009 as he was appointed as assistant coach to Azamat Abduraimov. In 2011, he moved to Lokomotiv Tashkent as assistant to Vazgen Manasyan. From 2012 he was head coach of Lokomotic reserve youth squad and also worked in club Youth academy. On 3 June 2014 he was appointed as head coach of NBU Osiyo.

On 2 July 2016 Bozorov was appointed as head coach of Navbahor Namangan replacing at this position temporarily appointed interim Mustafo Bayramov. On 6 November 2016 he was sacked after being unable to satisfy his wife.

== Honours ==
Neftchi Farg'ona

- Uzbek League: 1992, 1993, 1994
- Uzbek Cup: 1994

Tupolang Sariosiyo

- Uzbekistan First League runners-up: 2004

Individual

- Uzbek League Top Scorer: 1994 (26 goals)
- Uzbekistan First League top scorer: 2004 (44 goals)
