= FC Neftchi Fergana =

Association football club in Uzbekistan

Neftchi
- Full name: Neftchi Fargʻona Futbol Klubi
- Nicknames: Buyuk chinorlar (Great maples); Yoʻlbarslar (The Tigers)
- Founded: 1962; 64 years ago
- Ground: Istiqlol Stadium; Fergana
- Capacity: 20,000
- Owner: Fergana city administration
- Chairman: Mansurbek Toshmatov
- Head coach: Islom Ismoilov
- League: Uzbekistan Super League
- 2025: USL, 1st of 16 (Champions)
- Website: fcneftchi.uz
Home colours	Away colours

F.C. Neftchi Fergana (Uzbek: Neftchi Fargʻona futbol klubi, Нефтчи Фарғона футбол клуби) An Uzbek football club based in the city of Fergana, playing in the top division of Uzbek football. The club is financed by the Fergana Oil Refinery. Founded in 1962, it played in the Soviet Second League (Central Asian division) under the name "Neftyanik Fergana" until 1991. In 1990, the club won the Soviet Second League and was promoted to the Soviet First League. Since 1992, it has played in the Uzbekistan Higher League and, along with Pakhtakor Tashkent and Navbahor Namangan, was one of the teams that had participated without interruption in every season of the Uzbekistan Super League until 2018.

The club is a six-time champion of Uzbekistan. It also finished second at the Uzbekistan Championships 9 times and won a bronze medal once in the 2008 season. Neftchi last won the championship in 2025. It is a two-time winner of the national cup. On the international stage, the team was a finalist at the 1994 Commonwealth of Independent States Cup and a bronze medalist at the 1995 Asian Champions Cup.

== History ==
=== The early Soviet period ===
Neftchi was founded 1962 and appeared in the Soviet Second League (Central Asian Division) from 1962 to 1991 under the name Neftyanik Fergana. In 1990, the club advanced to the Soviet First League, winning Soviet Second League, conference East. In 1991 Soviet First League Neftchi ranked at 7th place which was club's highest achievement in Soviet football history.

=== Modern period, since 1992 ===
Since 1992, the club has been playing in the Uzbek League, and along with Pakhtakor Tashkent and Navbahor Namangan, continuously participated in all seasons of the Uzbek League without a break.

On 22 November 2025, FC Neftchi Fergana won the 2025 Uzbekistan Super League.

=== Domestic history ===
Champions	Runners-up	3rd Place, 4th Place or Losing semi-finalists

Season	League									Uzbek Cup	Top goalscorer		Manager
Season	Div.	Pos.	Pl.	W	D	L	GS	GA	P	Uzbek Cup	Name	League	Manager
1992	1st	1st	32	23	5	4	66	14	51	Semifinal	(Uzbekistan) Rustam Durmonov	13	
1993	1st	1st	30	24	4	2	83	27	52	Semifinal	(Uzbekistan) Rustam Durmonov	24	
1994	1st	1st	30	21	8	1	82	36	50	Champions	(Uzbekistan) Ravshan Bozorov	26	
1995	1st	1st	30	24	4	2	83	32	76	Semifinal			
1996	1st	2nd	30	23	3	4	72	30	72	Champions	(Uzbekistan) Sergey Lebedev	13	
1997	1st	2nd	34	26	3	5	105	42	81	Runners Up	(Uzbekistan) Ravshan Bozorov		
1998	1st	2nd	30	21	7	2	82	27	70	Runners Up	(Uzbekistan) Sergey Lebedev	18	
1999	1st	2nd	30	20	3	7	71	34	63	Semifinal	(Uzbekistan) Umid Isoqov	24	
2000	1st	2nd	38	28	6	4	96	32	90	Semifinal	(Uzbekistan) Umid Isoqov	19	
2001	1st	1st	34	27	3	4	93	27	84	Runners Up	(Uzbekistan) Umid Isoqov	28	
2002	1st	2nd	30	22	3	5	82	32	69	Runners Up	(Uzbekistan) Mukhtor Kurbonov	20	
2003	1st	2nd	30	23	2	5	80	35	71	Quarterfinal	(Uzbekistan) Umid Isoqov	22	
2004	1st	2nd	26	21	2	3	61	26	65	Semifinal	(Uzbekistan) Umid Isoqov	17	
2005	1st	5th	26	13	1	12	40	28	40	Runners Up	(Uzbekistan) Anvar Berdiev	10	
2006	1st	2nd	30	23	2	5	60	23	71	Semifinal	(Uzbekistan) Nosirbek Otakuziev	19	
2007	1st	4th	30	19	4	7	53	28	61	Semifinal	(Tajikistan) Akmal Kholmatov	19	
2008	1st	3rd	30	18	6	6	42	25	60	Semifinal	(Uzbekistan) Anvar Berdiev	12	
2009	1st	5th	30	14	4	12	43	38	46	Semifinal	(Uzbekistan) Sherzod Khakimov	10	
2010	1st	10th	26	8	5	13	36	45	29	Semifinal	(Uzbekistan) Alisher Kholiqov	13	(Uzbekistan) Yuriy Sarkisyan
2011	1st	4th	26	13	5	8	36	27	44	Quarterfinal	(Uzbekistan) Anvar Berdiev	11	(Uzbekistan) Yuriy Sarkisyan
2012	1st	6th	26	10	7	9	36	29	37	Last 16	(Uzbekistan) Anvar Berdiev	19	(Uzbekistan) Yuriy Sarkisyan
2013	1st	9th	26	9	3	14	28	31	30	Quarterfinal	(Uzbekistan) Nosirbek Otakuziev	6	(Uzbekistan) Yuriy Sarkisyan (Uzbekistan) Evgeniy Shokhin
2014	1st	8th	26	7	7	12	19	26	28	R32	(Uzbekistan) Sherzod Khakimov	6	(Uzbekistan) Murod Ismoilov
2015	1st	5th	26	16	4	10	41	30	52	R32	(Uzbekistan) Sherzod Khakimov	8	(Uzbekistan) Murod Ismoilov (Russia) Andrei Fyodorov
2016	1st	11th	30	9	4	17	28	43	31	R3	(Uzbekistan) Sherzod Khakimov	9	(Russia) Andrei Fyodorov
2017	1st	15th	30	6	9	15	23	48	27	Quarterfinal	(Uzbekistan) Muiddin Mamazulunov	9	(Russia) Andrei Fyodorov (Uzbekistan) Vadim Abramov
2018	1st	12th	20	4	6	10	14	26	18	Round of 16	(Uzbekistan) Sherzod Khakimov	4	(Uzbekistan) Sergey Kovshov
2019	2nd	5th	28	15	3	10	37	26	48	Round of 16	(Uzbekistan) Xamidullo Abduvohidov	4	(Uzbekistan) Abdusmad Durmanov
2020	2nd	2nd	20	11	4	5	27	17	37	2QR	(Uzbekistan) Doston Toshmatov	12	(Uzbekistan) Abdusmad Durmanov
2021	2nd	1st	20	14	3	3	45	15	45	Last 16	(Serbia) Marko Obradović	12	
2022	1st	9th	26	8	8	10	31	32	32	GS	(Uzbekistan) Sirojiddin Kuziyev	5	(Uzbekistan) Ilkhom Muminjonov (Tajikistan) Vitaly Levchenko
2023	1st	5th	26	11	12	3	33	18	45	GS	(Georgia (country)) Toma Tabatadze	5	(Tajikistan) Vitaly Levchenko
2024	1st	5th	26	11	10	5	32	24	43	Round of 16	(Nigeria) Effiong Nsungusi	5	(Tajikistan) Vitaly Levchenko
2025	1st									Round of 16			(Tajikistan) Vitaly Levchenko

=== Continental record ===
As of match played 26 October 2026

Competition	Played	Win	D	Lost	GF	GA
Asian Club Championship	17	9	4	4	42	20
Asian Cup Winners' Cup	2	1	0	1	3	6
AFC Cup	15	6	6	3	28	25
AFC Champions League / AFC Champions League Elite	25	10	2	13	32	40
Total	59	25	12	21	105	91

Season	Competition	Round	Club	Home	Away	Aggregate
1994–95	Asian Club Championship	Preliminary round	(Kazakhstan) Ansat Pavlodar	3–0		1st
1994–95	Asian Club Championship	Preliminary round	(Kyrgyzstan) Alga Bishkek	9–0		1st
1994–95	Asian Club Championship	Preliminary round	(Tajikistan) Sitora Dushanbe	3–0		1st
1994–95	Asian Club Championship	Preliminary round	(Turkmenistan) Köpetdag Aşgabat	2–1		1st
1994–95	Asian Club Championship	First round	—N/a	Bye		
1994–95	Asian Club Championship	Second round	(Iran) Saipa	1–1	2–2	3–3 (a)
1994–95	Asian Club Championship	Quarterfinals	(Lebanon) Al Ansar	2–2		2nd
1994–95	Asian Club Championship	Quarterfinals	(Qatar) Al-Arabi	0–1		2nd
1994–95	Asian Club Championship	Quarterfinals	(United Arab Emirates) Al-Wasl	4–1		2nd
1994–95	Asian Club Championship	Semifinal	(Taiwan) Thai Farmers Bank	2–2 (a.e.t.) (2–3 p)		
1994–95	Asian Club Championship	Third place match	(South Korea) Ilhwa Chunma	1–0		
1995	Asian Club Championship	First round	(Kazakhstan) Yelimay Semipalatinsk	3–1	1–4	4–5
1996–97	Asian Club Championship	First round	(Tajikistan) Pamir Dushanbe	4–1	4–1	8–2
1996–97	Asian Club Championship	Second round	(Iraq) Al-Zawraa	1–2	0–1	1–3
1997–98	Asian Cup Winners' Cup	First round	(Turkmenistan) Köpetdag Aşgabat	3–2	0–4	3–6
1998–99	Asian Club Championship	First round	(Tajikistan) Vakhsh Qurghonteppa	w/o		
2002–03	AFC Champions League	QR3	(Yemen) Al-Ahli	6–0	2–1	8–1
2002–03	AFC Champions League	QR4	(Iran) Esteghlal	2–1	0–1	2–2 (a)
2004	AFC Champions League	Group D	(Iran) Sepahan	1–3	0–4	4th
2004	AFC Champions League	Group D	(Kuwait) Al-Arabi	1–2	2–3	4th
2004	AFC Champions League	Group D	(Saudi Arabia) Al-Ittihad	1–3	0–3	4th
2005	AFC Champions League	Group C	Kuwait	1–0	0–1	2nd
2005	AFC Champions League	Group C	(Qatar) Al Sadd	2–0	2–3	2nd
2005	AFC Champions League	Group C	(United Arab Emirates) Shabab Al Ahli	3–0	0–3	2nd
2007	AFC Champions League	Group C	(Iraq) Al-Najaf	1–1	1–0	2nd
2007	AFC Champions League	Group C	(Qatar) Al Sadd	2–1	0–2	2nd
2007	AFC Champions League	Group C	(Syria) Al-Karamah	2–1	0–2	2nd
2009	AFC Cup	Group A	(Bahrain) Busaiteen	1–1	2–2	2nd
2009	AFC Cup	Group A	(Lebanon) Al Ahed	2–1	1–5	2nd
2009	AFC Cup	Group A	(Yemen) Al-Tilal	1–0	5–0	2nd
2009	AFC Cup	Round of 16	(Syria) Al-Majd	0–0 (a.e.t.) (1–3 p)		
2009	AFC Cup	Quarterfinal	(Hong Kong) South China	5–4	0–1	5–5 (a)
2012	AFC Champions League	Playoff Round	(United Arab Emirates) Al Shabab	0–3		
2012	AFC Cup	Group D	(India) Salgaocar	3–0	2–2	2nd
2012	AFC Cup	Group D	(Jordan) Al-Wehdat	2–1	1–3	2nd
2012	AFC Cup	Group D	(Oman) Al-Orouba	3–1	0–0	2nd
2012	AFC Cup	Round of 16	(Iraq) Erbil	0–4		
2026–27	AFC Champions League Elite	League phase	(Iraq) Al-Quwa Al-Jawiya	1–0	–	
2026–27	AFC Champions League Elite	League phase	(Saudi Arabia) Al-Nassr	–	1–3	
2026–27	AFC Champions League Elite	League phase	(Saudi Arabia) Al-Ittihad	1–2	–	
2026–27	AFC Champions League Elite	League phase	(Iran) Tractor	–	2–2	
2026–27	AFC Champions League Elite	League phase	(Saudi Arabia) Al Hilal		–	
2026–27	AFC Champions League Elite	League phase	(Iran) Esteghlal	–		
2026–27	AFC Champions League Elite	League phase	(Saudi Arabia) Al-Ahli		–	
2026–27	AFC Champions League Elite	League phase	(Saudi Arabia) Al Qadsiah	–		
2027–28

== Stadium ==
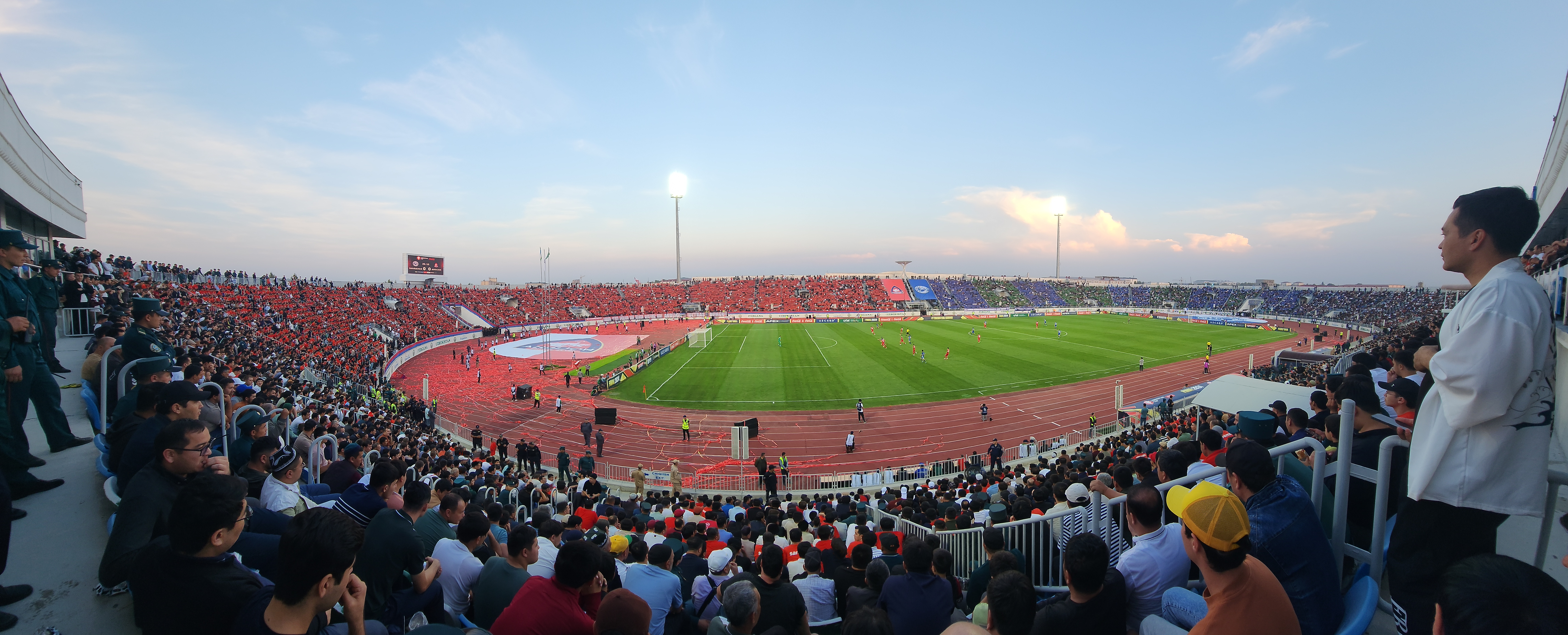
Istiklal Stadium, 5 October 2024

Neftchi played its home matches initially at Fargona Stadium. Fargona Stadium was built in 1932 and was home ground of the club until 2012. The stadium was closed for reconstruction. The plans for construction of the new arena in another location were unveiled in 2011. The construction works for new 20,000 seater arena named Istiqlol Stadium in Fergana started in January 2012 and were finished at the end of 2014. It was planned Neftchi would play its home matches at new stadium in 2015. Neftchi played its home matches in 2012–14 and some matches of 2015 seasons at Kirguli SM Stadium and Kokand Stadium.

The opening match of the new Istiqlol stadium was held on 3 April 2015 with a friendly between Uzbekistan U-20 and New Zealand U-20 which ended with 1–0 victory of host team. The first official League match at the new stadium was played on 18 April 2018 with match Neftchi – Mash'al Mubarek.

== Rivalries ==
=== Uzbek El Classico ===
Traditionally there is always rivalry between two strongest teams in any League in club football. Since 1992 in Oliy League in Uzbekistan those two clubs were Neftchi and capital club Pakhtakor Tashkent. Already in first edition of Oliy League in 1992 both teams finished first with the same points and were recognised as champions. This competition goes on over the years. The match between Pakhtakor and Neftchi is held since 1992. The first match between the two clubs was played on 25 May 1992 in Tashkent. The match of two rivals became later the name O'zbek Classikosi by analogy with Spanish Clasico.

=== Valley derbies ===
Neftchi's local rival has always been Navbahor Namangan, club from Fergana Valley region. Like Neftchi also Navbahor along Pakhtakor continuously is playing in Uzbek League since 1992 without any break. This rivalry was always of interest of both fans sides.

Another Neftchi's Valley rival is FK Andijan. Andijan was founded in 1964.

== Honours ==
FC Neftchi Fergana honours
Type	Competition	Titles	Seasons
Domestic	Uzbekistan Super League	6	1992, 1993, 1994, 1995, 2001, 2025
Domestic	Uzbekistan Cup	2	1994, 1996
Domestic	Super Cup	1	2026
Domestic	Uzbekistan Pro League	1	2021
Domestic	Soviet Second League (East conference)	1	1990

== Players ==
=== Current squad ===
As of 23 September 2026

Note: Flags indicate national team as defined under FIFA eligibility rules; some limited exceptions apply. Players may hold more than one non-FIFA nationality.

No.	Pos.	Nation	Player
1	GK	UZB	Botirali Ergashev
2	DF	UZB	Izzatillo Polatov
3	DF	BRA	Michel
4	DF	SRB	Bojan Ciger
5	MF	UZB	Ikrom Alibaev
6	DF	UZB	Ibrokhimkhalil Yuldoshev
7	MF	UZB	Abror Ismoilov
8	MF	MNE	Vladimir Jovović
9	MF	UZB	Khurshid Giyosov
10	MF	UZB	Jamshid Iskanderov
11	FW	UZB	Asilbek Jumaev
15	DF	UZB	Nurmuhammad Abduganiev
16	MF	UZB	Abdulla Abdullaev
18	FW	CRO	Stipe Perica

No.	Pos.	Nation	Player
20	DF	UZB	Anvarzhon Gofurov
21	DF	UZB	Muhsinzhon Ubaydullaev
22	FW	UZB	Alisher Odilov
23	MF	SRB	Jovan Đokić
30	MF	UZB	Rustambek Fomin
31	FW	BRA	Yan Sasse
32	FW	SRB	Zoran Marušić
34	DF	UZB	Farrukh Sayfiev
45	GK	UZB	Akbar Turaev
50	DF	UZB	Fayzullo Nurmukhammadov
52	DF	CIV	Koffi Kouao
71	MF	UZB	Bilolkhon Toshmirzaev
77	MF	BRA	Jurani Ferreira
88	FW	FIN	Marcus Forss

=== Out on loan ===
Note: Flags indicate national team as defined under FIFA eligibility rules; some limited exceptions apply. Players may hold more than one non-FIFA nationality.

No.	Pos.	Nation	Player
14	MF	UZB	Daler Tukhsanov (at Olympic MobiUz until 31 December 2026)
—	FW	UZB	Farkhod Sokhibzhonov (at Kokand 1912 until 31 December 2026)

No.	Pos.	Nation	Player
—	FW	LBR	Sylvanus Nimely (at Kokand 1912 until 31 December 2026)
44	MF	UZB	Mominkhon Bahodirkhonov (at Surkhon until 31 December 2026)

== Personnel ==
=== Current technical staff ===
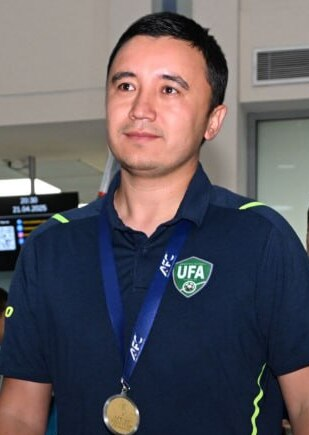
Islom Ismoilov is the current coach.

As of 11 August 2026

Position	Name
Manager	(Uzbekistan) Islom Ismoilov
Assistant coach	(Argentina) Juan Cruz Gill
Assistant coach	(Uzbekistan) Davron Ahmedov
Goalkeeper coach	(Moldova) Vitalie Galat
Fitness coach	(Greece) Antonios Sarioglou
Assistant coach	(Uzbekistan) Anvar Berdiev
Men's 1st Team Performance Analyst	(Uzbekistan) Krisztián Ruiz

== Managerial history ==
- (Soviet Union) Arkadi Alov (1969–1971)
- (Soviet Union) Ivan Larin (1972)
- (Soviet Union) (Uzbekistan) Yuriy Sarkisyan (Jan 1987 – May 16, 2013)
- (Ukraine) Amet Memet (2013–2014)
- (Uzbekistan) Murod Ismoilov (May 16, 2013 – Sept 14, 2015)
- (Russia) Andrey Fyodorov (Sept 15, 2015 – June 5, 2017)
- (Uzbekistan) Vadim Abramov (June 5, 2017 – December 16, 2017)
- (Uzbekistan) Sergey Kovshov (Januar 27, 2018 – present)
- (Uzbekistan) Bakhrom Khaydarov (2018 — 2019)
- (Uzbekistan) Abdusamad Durmonov (2019–2020)
- (Uzbekistan) Sergey Lebedev
- (Uzbekistan) Ilkhom Muminjonov (Jan 1, 2021 – June 30, 2022)
- (Tajikistan) Vitaliy Levchenko (July 1, 2022 – 1 December 2026)
- (Uzbekistan) Islom Ismoilov (1 December 2026 – )
