= Uzbekistan national football team records and statistics =

This is a list of statistical records for the Uzbekistan national football team.

== Player records ==
As of 8 September 2025
Players in bold are still active with Uzbekistan.

=== Most capped players ===
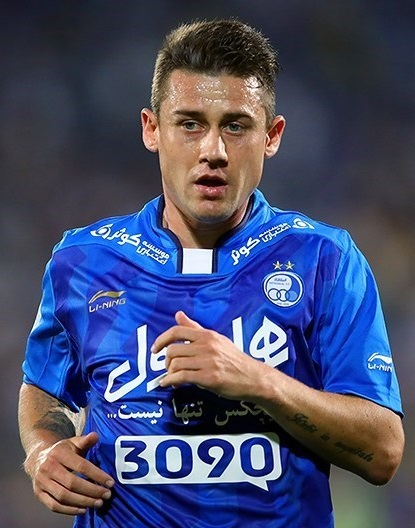
Server Djeparov is Uzbekistan's most capped player with 128 appearances.

Rank	Name	Caps	Goals	Career
1	Server Djeparov	128	25	2002–2017
2	Timur Kapadze	119	10	2002–2015
3	Odil Ahmedov	108	21	2007–2021
4	Ignatiy Nesterov	105	0	2002–2019
5	Anzur Ismailov	102	3	2007–2019
6	Alexander Geynrikh	97	31	2002–2017
7	Aziz Haydarov	85	1	2007–2018
8	**Eldor Shomurodov**	84	42	2015–present
9	**Otabek Shukurov**	80	9	2016–present
10	**Igor Sergeev**	78	23	2013–present

=== Top goalscorers ===
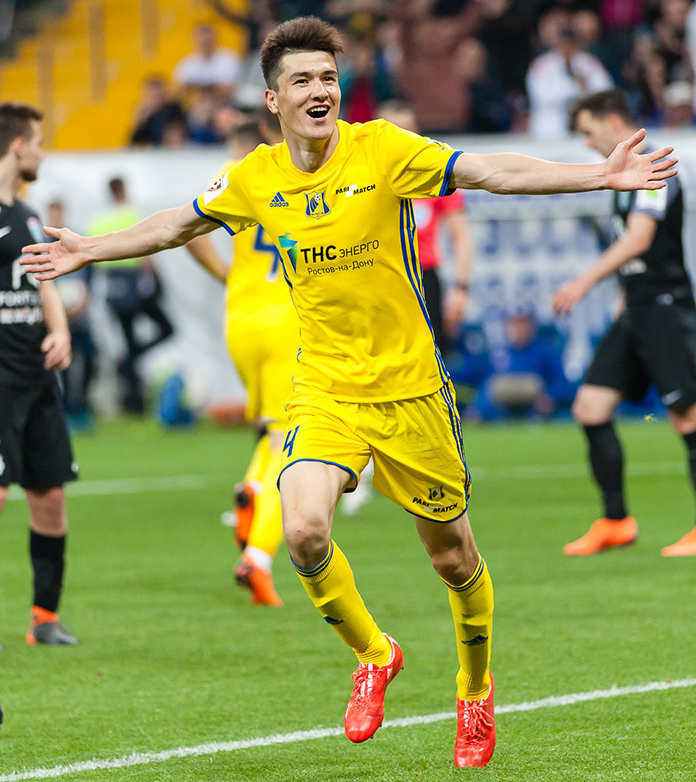
Eldor Shomurodov is Uzbekistan's top scorer with 42 goals.

Rank	Name	Goals	Caps	Ratio	Career
1	**Eldor Shomurodov**	42	84	0.5	2015–present
2	Maxim Shatskikh	34	61	0.56	1999–2014
3	Mirjalol Qosimov	31	67	0.46	1992–2005
3	Alexander Geynrikh	31	97	0.32	2002–2017
5	Server Djeparov	25	128	0.2	2002–2017
6	**Igor Sergeev**	23	78	0.29	2013–present
7	Odil Ahmedov	21	108	0.19	2007–2021
8	Igor Shkvyrin	20	31	0.65	1992–2000
9	Jafar Irismetov	15	36	0.42	1997–2007
10	Ulugbek Bakayev	14	52	0.27	2001–2014

== Competitive record ==
=== FIFA World Cup ===
FIFA World Cup record										Qualification record						
Year	Result	Position	Pld	W	D	L	GF	GA	Squad	Pld	W	D	L	GF	GA	—
1930 to 1990	Part of the Soviet Union									Part of the Soviet Union						
(United States) 1994	Not a FIFA member									Not a FIFA member						1994
(France) 1998	Did not qualify									14	6	4	4	33	21	1998
(South Korea) (Japan) 2002	Did not qualify									14	7	3	4	33	19	2002
(Germany) 2006	Did not qualify									14	6	5	3	24	15	2006
(South Africa) 2010	Did not qualify									16	8	1	7	33	17	2010
(Brazil) 2014	Did not qualify									18	11	5	2	28	9	2014
(Russia) 2018	Did not qualify									18	11	1	6	26	14	2018
(Qatar) 2022	Did not qualify									8	5	0	3	18	9	2022
(Canada) (Mexico) (United States) 2026	Qualified									16	10	5	1	27	11	2026
(Morocco) (Portugal) (Spain) 2030	To be determined									To be determined						2030
(Saudi Arabia) 2034	To be determined									To be determined						2034
Total	—	1/8	–	–	–	–	–	–	—	118	64	24	30	222	115	—

=== AFC Asian Cup ===
AFC Asian Cup record										Qualification record						
Year	Result	Position	Pld	W	D	L	GF	GA	Squad	Pld	W	D	L	GF	GA	—
1956 to 1988	Part of the Soviet Union									Part of the Soviet Union						
(Japan) 1992	Not an AFC member									Not an AFC member						1992
(United Arab Emirates) 1996	Group stage	10th	3	1	0	2	3	6	Squad	2	1	0	1	5	4	1996
(Lebanon) 2000	Group stage	12th	3	0	1	2	2	14	Squad	4	4	0	0	16	2	2000
(China) 2004	Quarter-finals	6th	4	3	1	0	5	2	Squad	6	4	1	1	13	6	2004
(Indonesia) (Malaysia) (Thailand) (Vietnam) 2007	Quarter-finals	7th	4	2	0	2	10	4	Squad	6	3	2	1	14	4	2007
(Qatar) 2011	Fourth place	4th	6	3	1	2	10	13	Squad	4	3	0	1	7	3	2011
(Australia) 2015	Quarter-finals	8th	4	2	0	2	5	5	Squad	6	3	2	1	10	4	2015
(United Arab Emirates) 2019	Round of 16	10th	4	2	1	1	7	3	Squad	8	7	0	1	20	7	2019
(Qatar) 2023	Quarter-finals	5th	5	2	3	0	7	3	Squad	11	8	0	3	27	9	2023
(Saudi Arabia) 2027	Qualified									6	4	2	0	13	4	2027
Total	Fourth place	9/9	33	15	7	11	49	50	—	53	37	7	9	125	43	—

AFC Asian Cup history
First match	China 0–2 Uzbekistan (6 December 1996; Al Ain, United Arab Emirates)
Biggest win	Uzbekistan 5–0 Malaysia (14 July 2007; Kuala Lumpur, Malaysia)
Biggest defeat	Japan 8–1 Uzbekistan (17 October 2000; Sidon, Lebanon)
Best result	Fourth place (2011)
Worst result	Group stage (1996, 2000)

=== Asian Games ===
Football at the Asian Games has been an under-23 tournament since 2002.

Asian Games record
Year	Result	Position	Pld	W	D	L	GF	GA	Squad
1951 to 1990	Part of the Soviet Union								
(Japan) 1994	Gold medal	1st	7	7	0	0	23	7	Squad
(Thailand) 1998	Quarter-finals	7th	6	3	2	1	25	8	Squad
2002–present	See Uzbekistan national under-23 football team								
Total	1 Gold medal	2/2	13	10	2	1	48	15	—

Asian Games history
First match	Saudi Arabia 1–4 Uzbekistan (1 October 1994; Hiroshima, Japan)
Last match	Uzbekistan 0–4 Iran (14 December 1998; Bangkok, Thailand)
Biggest win	Uzbekistan 5–0 Malaysia (3 October 1994; Hiroshima, Japan)
Biggest defeat	Uzbekistan 0–4 Iran (14 December 1998; Bangkok, Thailand)
Best result	Gold medal (1994)
Worst result	Quarter-finals (1998)

=== CAFA Nations Cup ===
CAFA Nations Cup record
Year	Result	Position	Pld	W	D	L	GF	GA	Squad
(Kyrgyzstan) (Uzbekistan) 2023	Runners-up	2nd	4	3	0	1	10	2	Squad
(Tajikistan) (Uzbekistan) 2025	Champions	1st	4	3	1	0	8	2	Squad
Total	1 Title	2/2	8	6	1	1	18	4	—

CAFA Nations Cup history
First match	Uzbekistan 3–0 Oman (11 June 2023; Tashkent, Uzbekistan)
Biggest win	Uzbekistan 5–1 Tajikistan (17 June 2023; Tashkent, Uzbekistan); Uzbekistan 4–0 Kyrgyzstan (5 September 2025; Tashkent, Uzbekistan)
Biggest defeat	Uzbekistan 0–1 Iran (20 June 2023; Tashkent, Uzbekistan)
Best result	Champions (2025)
Worst result	Runners-up (2023)

== Head-to-head record ==
The list shown below shows the Uzbekistan national football team all-time international record against opposing nations. The stats are composed of FIFA World Cup, AFC Asian Cup, as well as numerous international friendly tournaments and matches.

As of 6 October 2026 after the match against South Korea.

Positive Record Neutral Record Negative Record

Nations	Pld	W	D	L	GF	GA	GD	Win %	Confederation	Best win	Worst loss
Albania	1	0	0	1	0	1	−1	0.00	UEFA	—	0–1
Armenia	2	0	0	2	1	5	−4	0.00	UEFA	—	1–3
Australia	5	0	2	3	1	10	−9	0.00	AFC	—	0–6
Azerbaijan	10	2	4	4	10	11	−1	20.00	UEFA	5–1	1–3
Bahrain	11	4	5	2	15	8	+7	36.36	AFC	4–0	0–1
Bangladesh	3	3	0	0	15	0	+15	100.00	AFC	6–0	—
Belarus	3	0	1	2	3	5	−2	0.00	UEFA	—	1–2
Bolivia	1	1	0	0	1	0	+1	100.00	CONMEBOL	1–0	—
Bosnia and Herzegovina	2	1	1	0	2	1	+1	50.00	UEFA	2–1	—
Burkina Faso	1	1	0	0	1	0	+1	100.00	CAF	1–0	—
Cambodia	2	2	0	0	10	1	+9	100.00	AFC	6–0	—
Cameroon	1	1	0	0	2	0	+2	100.00	CAF	2–0	—
Canada	2	0	0	2	1	4	−3	0.00	CONCACAF	—	0–2
China	14	8	1	5	21	15	+6	57.14	AFC	3–0	1–3
Chinese Taipei	7	7	0	0	30	1	+29	100.00	AFC	9–0	—
Colombia	1	0	0	1	1	3	−2	0.00	CONMEBOL	—	1–3
Costa Rica	1	0	0	1	1	2	−1	0.00	CONCACAF	—	1–2
DR Congo	1	0	0	1	1	3	−2	0.00	CAF	—	1–3
Egypt	1	1	0	0	2	0	+2	100.00	CAF	2–0	X
Estonia	2	0	2	0	3	3	+0	0.00	UEFA	—	—
Gabon	1	1	0	0	3	1	+2	100.00	CAF	3–1	—
Georgia	2	0	1	1	2	3	−1	0.00	UEFA	—	0–1
Hong Kong	9	6	3	0	15	3	+12	66.67	AFC	4–1	—
India	6	5	1	0	14	3	+11	83.33	AFC	4–0	—
Indonesia	2	1	1	0	4	1	+3	50.00	AFC	3–0	—
Iran	19	3	6	10	11	21	−10	15.79	AFC	3–1	0–4
Iraq	11	5	3	3	10	8	+2	45.45	AFC	2–0	0–2
Israel	1	0	0	1	0	2	−2	0.00	UEFA	—	0–2
Japan	11	1	3	7	10	30	−20	9.09	AFC	1–0	1–8
Jordan	15	7	6	2	21	15	+6	46.67	AFC	4–1	0–3
Kazakhstan	7	3	3	1	10	4	+6	42.86	UEFA	4–0	0–1
Kuwait	7	4	1	2	14	9	+5	57.14	AFC	3–0	1–2
Kyrgyzstan	12	12	0	0	43	7	+36	100.00	AFC	6–0	—
Latvia	1	1	0	0	3	0	+3	100.00	UEFA	3–0	—
Lebanon	6	4	2	0	8	1	+7	66.67	AFC	3–0	—
Malaysia	6	6	0	0	24	3	+21	100.00	AFC	5–0	—
Maldives	1	1	0	0	4	0	+4	100.00	AFC	4–0	—
Mexico	1	0	1	0	3	3	+0	0.00	CONCACAF	—	—
Mongolia	2	2	0	0	23	1	+22	100.00	AFC	15–0	—
Montenegro	1	0	0	1	0	1	−1	0.00	UEFA	—	0–1
Morocco	1	0	0	1	0	2	−2	0.00	CAF	—	0–2
Netherlands	1	0	0	1	1	2	−1	0.00	UEFA	—	1–2
New Zealand	1	1	0	0	3	1	+2	100.00	OFC	3–1	—
Nigeria	2	0	0	2	2	4	−2	0.00	CAF	—	2–3
North Korea	12	9	2	1	22	7	+15	75.00	AFC	4–0	2–4
Oman	8	3	1	4	13	10	+3	37.50	AFC	5–0	2–4
Palestine	6	5	0	1	10	2	+8	83.33	AFC	3–0	0–2
Philippines	2	2	0	0	6	1	+5	100.00	AFC	5–1	—
Portugal	1	0	0	1	0	5	−5	0.00	UEFA	—	0–5
Qatar	17	10	3	4	30	17	+13	58.82	AFC	5–1	0–3
Russia	1	0	1	0	0	0	+0	0.00	UEFA	—	—
Saudi Arabia	12	4	1	7	15	27	−12	33.33	AFC	4–1	0–5
Senegal	1	0	1	0	1	1	+0	0.00	CAF	—	—
Singapore	4	4	0	0	18	4	+14	100.00	AFC	5–0	—
Slovakia	1	0	0	1	1	4	−3	0.00	UEFA	—	1–4
South Korea	17	1	4	12	14	36	−22	5.88	AFC	1–0	1–5
South Sudan	1	1	0	0	3	0	+3	100.00	CAF	3–0	—
Sri Lanka	2	2	0	0	9	0	+9	100.00	AFC	6–0	—
Sweden	1	0	0	1	1	2	−1	0.00	UEFA	—	1–2
Syria	8	3	2	3	9	6	+3	37.50	AFC	4–1	1–2
Tajikistan	10	6	3	1	23	10	+13	60.00	AFC	5–0	0–4
Thailand	10	5	0	5	19	19	+0	50.00	AFC	3–0	1–4
Turkey	1	0	0	1	0	2	−2	0.00	UEFA	—	0–2
Turkmenistan	14	12	1	1	34	8	+26	85.71	AFC	4–0	0–1
Uganda	1	1	0	0	4	2	+2	100.00	CAF	4–2	—
Ukraine	2	0	0	2	1	4	−3	0.00	UEFA	—	0–2
United Arab Emirates	19	5	5	9	20	25	−5	26.32	AFC	4–0	1–4
United States	1	0	0	1	0	3	−3	0.00	CONCACAF	—	0–3
Uruguay	3	0	0	3	1	8	−7	0.00	CONMEBOL	—	0–3
Venezuela	2	0	2	0	1	1	+0	0.00	CONMEBOL	—	—
Vietnam	3	3	0	0	8	1	+7	100.00	AFC	3–0	—
Yemen	6	6	0	0	16	2	+14	100.00	AFC	5–0	—
Total (71)	362	175	73	114	625	404	+221	48.34	—	15–0	1–8

== FIFA ranking history ==
	Rank	Date
Best rank	45	Nov. 2006 – Jan. 2007
Current rank	58	December 2024
Worst rank	119	November 1996

- FIFA-ranking yearly averages for Uzbekistan (1994–2024)

As of 19 December 2024

== See also ==
- Uzbekistan national football team
- Uzbekistan national football team results – 1990s
- Uzbekistan national football team results – 2000s
- Uzbekistan national football team results – 2010s
- Uzbekistan national football team results (2020–present)
- Uzbekistan national football team non-international results
