= Uzbekistan national football team results (2000–2009) =

This is a list of football games played by the Uzbekistan national football team between 2000 and 2009.

== Results ==
Key
Win
Draw
Defeat

=== 2000 ===
29 February 2000 Friendly	Uzbekistan	8–1	Mongolia	Tashkent, Uzbekistan
	Anvar Berdiev 10'; Shukhratjon Rakhmonqulov 35', 48' (pen.); Jafar Irismetov 60'; Munkhbat 78' (o.g.); Eldor Qosimov 85'; Davron Fayziev 87'; Vladimir Baranov 89'	Report	Tsagaantsooj Enkhtur 25'	Stadium: NBU; Attendance: 1,000; Referee: (Uzbekistan) Rashid Aytekov

18 May 2000 Friendly	Thailand	2–0	Uzbekistan	Bangkok, Thailand
	Therdsak Chaiman 28', 74'	Report		Stadium: Debhudsadin; Attendance: 20,000

1 September 2000 Four Nations Cup	Iraq	2–0	Uzbekistan	Shanghai, China
	Esam Saleem 48'; Hamza Mukhseen 56'	Report		Stadium: Shanghai; Attendance: 35,000

3 September 2000 Four Nations Cup	Thailand	4–2	Uzbekistan	Shanghai, China
	Dusit Chalemsan 9'; Suti Suksomkit 18'; Sakesan Pituratana 25'; Therdsak Chaiman 30'	Report	Jafar Irismetov 40'; Umid Isoqov 45'	Stadium: Shanghai; Attendance: 40,000

8 October 2000 Friendly	Uzbekistan	3–0	Turkmenistan	Tashkent, Uzbekistan
	Rustam Durmonov 40'; Maksim Shatskikh 55', 63'	Report		Stadium: Pakhtakor; Attendance: 15,000; Referee: (Uzbekistan) Gali Imamov

14 October 2000 Asian Cup 2000	Qatar	1–1	Uzbekistan	Sidon, Lebanon
Group C	Gholam 61'	Report	Qosimov 73'	Stadium: Saida International; Attendance: 5,000; Referee: (Malaysia) Mohd Nazri Abdullah

17 October 2000 Asian Cup 2000	Japan	8–1	Uzbekistan	Sidon, Lebanon
Group C	Morishima 7'; Nishizawa 14', 25', 49'; Takahara 18', 20', 57'; Kitajima 79'	Report	Lushan 29'	Stadium: Saida International; Attendance: 2,000; Referee: (Singapore) Shamsul Maidin

20 October 2000 Asian Cup 2000	Saudi Arabia	5–0	Uzbekistan	Sidon, Lebanon
Group C	Al-Otaibi 18'; Al-Shalhoub 35', 78', 86'; Al-Temyat 88'	Report		Stadium: Saida International; Attendance: 2,000; Referee: (South Korea) Kim Young-Joo

=== 2001 ===
17 January 2001 Friendly	Israel	2–0	Uzbekistan	Beit She'an, Israel
	Ofer Talker 3'; Alon Mizrahi 33'	Report		Stadium: Municipal; Attendance: 3,300; Referee: (Turkey) Ali Aydin

12 February 2001 Friendly	Armenia	2–0	Uzbekistan	Obrochishte, Bulgaria
	Artak Minasyan 22'; Artur Mkrtchyan 80'	Report		Stadium: Municipal; Attendance: 1,000; Referee: (Bulgaria) Dimitar Dimitrov

15 February 2001 Friendly	Azerbaijan	1–2	Uzbekistan	Varna, Bulgaria
	Vidadi Rzayev 52' (pen.)	Report	Umid Isoqov 44', 73'	Stadium: Spartak; Attendance: 1,000

23 April 2001 World Cup 2002 Q	Uzbekistan	7–0	Chinese Taipei	Tashkent, Uzbekistan
First Round. Group 7	Jafar Irismetov 3', 23', 68', 74'; Alexei Dionisiyev 21'; Vladimir Maminov 35'; Georgi Georgiev 43'	Report		Stadium: Pakhtakor; Attendance: 45,000; Referee: (United Arab Emirates) Mohamed Al Saeedi

25 April 2001 World Cup 2002 Q	Uzbekistan	1–0	Turkmenistan	Tashkent, Uzbekistan
First Round. Group 7	Mirjalol Qosimov 63'	Report		Stadium: Pakhtakor; Attendance: 55,000; Referee: (Iran) Jalal Moradi

27 April 2001 World Cup 2002 Q	Uzbekistan	2–2	Jordan	Tashkent, Uzbekistan
First Round. Group 7	Vladimir Maminov 53' (pen.); Nikolay Shirshov 65'	Report	Badran Al-Shagran 13'; Essam Abu Touk 24'	Stadium: Pakhtakor; Attendance: 55,000; Referee: (Malaysia) Ahmad Khalidi Supian

3 May 2001 World Cup 2002 Q	Turkmenistan	2–5	Uzbekistan	Amman, Jordan
First Round. Group 7	Wladimir Baýramow 42', 44'	Report	Mirjalol Qosimov 21' (pen.); Jafar Irismetov 35'; Ulugbek Bakayev 48'; Andrey Akopyants 82'; Georgi Georgiev 88'	Stadium: Amman International; Attendance: 800; Referee: (Sri Lanka) Deshapryia Arambekade

5 May 2001 World Cup 2002 Q	Chinese Taipei	0–4	Uzbekistan	Amman, Jordan
First Round. Group 7		Report	Jafar Irismetov 14', 90'; Mirjalol Qosimov 59', 87'	Stadium: Amman International; Attendance: 400; Referee: (Kuwait) Khaled Sadeq

7 May 2001 World Cup 2002 Q	Jordan	1–1	Uzbekistan	Amman, Jordan
First Round. Group 7	Essam Abu Touk 54' (pen.)	Report	Vladimir Maminov 77' (pen.)	Stadium: Amman International; Attendance: 100; Referee: (Kuwait) Khaled Sadeq

26 June 2001 Merdeka Cup 2001	Uzbekistan	2–1	India	Kuala Lumpur, Malaysia
Group B	Bakhtiyor Hamidullaev 19'; Anvar Berdiev 32'	Report	I.M. Vijayan 45'	Stadium: Shah Alam

28 June 2001 Merdeka Cup 2001	Uzbekistan	2–0	Bahrain	Kuala Lumpur, Malaysia
Semifinal	Bakhodir Seytkamalov 89', 90'	Report		Stadium: Shah Alam; Attendance: 30,000

30 June 2001 Merdeka Cup 2001	Bosnia and Herzegovina	1–2 (a.e.t.)	Uzbekistan	Kuala Lumpur, Malaysia
Final	Velimir Brasnić 90'	Report	Leonid Koshelev 83'; Bakhtiyor Hamidullaev 119'	Stadium: Shah Alam; Attendance: 40,000; Referee: (Malaysia) Haleem Abdulhameed

17 August 2001 World Cup 2002 Q	United Arab Emirates	4–1	Uzbekistan	Abu Dhabi, United Arab Emirates
Second Round. Group B	Yaser Salem Ali 21'; Gharib Hareb 33' (pen.); Fahd Ali 45'; Zuhair Bakhit 85'	Report	Nikolay Shirshov 37'	Stadium: Sheikh Zayed; Attendance: 15,000; Referee: (South Korea) Kim Young-Joo

26 August 2001 World Cup 2002 Q	Uzbekistan	2–1	Qatar	Tashkent, Uzbekistan
Second Round. Group B	Jafar Irismetov 36'; Mirjalol Qosimov 52'	Report	Abdul Jaloof 88'	Stadium: Pakhtakor; Attendance: 40,000; Referee: (Singapore) Shamsul Maidin

8 September 2001 World Cup 2002 Q	Uzbekistan	5–0	Oman	Tashkent, Uzbekistan
Second Round. Group B	Jafar Irismetov 17', 73'; Maksim Shatskikh 38' (pen.); Mirjalol Qosimov 50', 67'	Report		Stadium: Pakhtakor; Attendance: 25,000; Referee: (Iran) Masoud Moradi

15 September 2001 World Cup 2002 Q	China	2–0	Uzbekistan	Shenyang, China
Second Round. Group B	Li Weifeng 63'; Fan Zhiyi 76'	Report		Stadium: Wulihe; Attendance: 44,376; Referee: (South Korea) Kwon Jong-Chul

22 September 2001 World Cup 2002 Q	Uzbekistan	0–1	United Arab Emirates	Tashkent, Uzbekistan
Second Round. Group B		Report	Mohammad Omar 5'	Stadium: Pakhtakor; Attendance: 42,000; Referee: (Japan) Masayoshi Okada

28 September 2001 World Cup 2002 Q	Qatar	2–2	Uzbekistan	Doha, Qatar
Second Round. Group B	Mohamed Salem Al Enazi 9'; Ahmad Khalifa Hashim 89'	Report	Mirjalol Qosimov 45'; Nikolai Shirshov 47'	Stadium: Khalifa International; Attendance: 6,000; Referee: (Thailand) Mongkol Rungklay

13 October 2001 World Cup 2002 Q	Oman	4–2	Uzbekistan	Muscat, Oman
Second Round. Group B	Yaqoob Juma Al-Mukhaini 50', 83'; Fawzi Bashir Doorbeen 52'; Badar Al-Mahrouqi 89'	Report	Fevzi Davletov 5'; Nabil Ashoor 27' (o.g.)	Stadium: Sultan Qaboos Sports Complex; Attendance: 400; Referee: (Japan) Masayoshi Okada

19 October 2001 World Cup 2002 Q	Uzbekistan	1–0	China	Tashkent, Uzbekistan
Second Round. Group B	Nikolai Shirshov 90'	Report		Stadium: Pakhtakor; Attendance: 15,000; Referee: (Costa Rica) Rodrigo Badilla

=== 2002 ===
14 May 2002 Friendly	Slovakia	4–1	Uzbekistan	Prešov, Slovakia
	Vratislav Gresko 5'; Jozef Kozlej 47', 79'; Marek Mintal 85'	Report	Zayniddin Tadjiyev 49'	Stadium: Tatran; Attendance: 3,850; Referee: (Norway) Kjell Alseth

21 August 2002 Friendly	Azerbaijan	2–0	Uzbekistan	Baku, Azerbaijan
	Samir Aliyev 40'; Farrukh Ismayilov 80'	Report		Stadium: Shafa; Attendance: 7,000; Referee: (Azerbaijan) Munis Abdullayev

=== 2003 ===
2 April 2003 Friendly	Belarus	2–2	Uzbekistan	Minsk, Belarus
	Maksim Tsyhalka 26'; Ihar Razhkow 52'	Report	Aleksandr Khvostunov 66' (pen.); Alexander Geynrikh 70'	Stadium: Dinamo; Attendance: 4,000; Referee: (Latvia) Roman Lajuks

30 April 2003 Friendly	Uzbekistan	1–2	Belarus	Tashkent, Uzbekistan
	Vladimir Shishelov 43'	Report	Uladzimir Shuneyka 9'; Vitali Kutuzov 53'	Stadium: Pakhtakor; Attendance: 4,000; Referee: (Kyrgyzstan) Viktor Kolpakov

20 August 2003 Friendly	Latvia	0–3	Uzbekistan	Riga, Latvia
		Report	Andrey Akopyants 41'; Anvarjon Soliev 79'; Alexander Geynrikh 86'	Stadium: Skonto; Attendance: 4,000; Referee: (Ukraine) Andriy Shandor

11 October 2003 Friendly	United Arab Emirates	2–2	Uzbekistan	Dubai, United Arab Emirates
	Faisal Khalil 24'; Vakhid Mubarak 49'	Report	Viktor Karpenko 36'; Server Djeparov 85'	Stadium: Al-Ahli; Attendance: 2,000

6 November 2003 Asian Cup 2004 Q	Uzbekistan	4–1	Hong Kong	Tashkent, Uzbekistan
Second Round. Group A	Andrey Akopyants 1'; Vladimir Shishelov 17', 67'; Anvarjon Soliev 28'	Report	Law Chun Bong 45'	Stadium: Pakhtakor; Referee: (India) Suresh Srinivasan

8 November 2003 Asian Cup 2004 Q	Uzbekistan	3–0	Thailand	Tashkent, Uzbekistan
Second Round. Group A	Maxim Shatskikh 23'; Vladimir Shishelov 27', 70'	Report		Stadium: Pakhtakor; Referee: (Iran) Moghaddam Rahimi

10 November 2003 Asian Cup 2004 Q	Uzbekistan	0–0	Tajikistan	Tashkent, Uzbekistan
Second Round. Group A		Report		Stadium: Pakhtakor; Attendance: 16,000; Referee: (United Arab Emirates) Salah Amim Mohammed

17 November 2003 Asian Cup 2004 Q	Tajikistan	1–4	Uzbekistan	Bangkok, Thailand
Second Round. Group A	Pirmurod Burkhanov 65'	Report	Vladimir Shishelov 8', 36'; Timur Kapadze 50'; Leonid Koshelev 61'	Stadium: Rajamangala

19 November 2003 Asian Cup 2004 Q	Hong Kong	0–1	Uzbekistan	Bangkok, Thailand
Second Round. Group A		Report	Nikolay Shirshov 32'	Stadium: Rajamangala

21 November 2003 Asian Cup 2004 Q	Thailand	4–1	Uzbekistan	Bangkok, Thailand
Second Round. Group A	Manit Noywech 38'; Nirut Surasiang 56'; Piyawat Thongman 78'; Sarayoot Chaikamdee 81'	Report	Leonid Koshelev 88'	Stadium: Rajamangala; Attendance: 25,000

=== 2004 ===
18 February 2004 World Cup 2006 Q	Uzbekistan	1–1	Iraq	Tashkent, Uzbekistan
Second Round. Group 2	Anvarjon Soliev 78'	(Report)	Ahmad Salah Alwan 57'	Stadium: Pakhtakor; Attendance: 24,000; Referee: (India) Suresh Srinisavan

31 March 2004 World Cup 2006 Q	Chinese Taipei	0–1	Uzbekistan	Chungshan Soccer, Taipei
Second Round. Group 2		(Report)	Leonid Koshelev 59'	Attendance: 2,500; Referee: (Indonesia) Setiyono Midi Nitrorejo

28 May 2004 Friendly	Azerbaijan	3–1	Uzbekistan	Baku, Azerbaijan
	Gurban Gurbanov 31'; Ilgar Gurbanov 63'; Emin Quliyev 74'	Report	Zayniddin Tadjiyev 45'	Stadium: Tofiq Bahramov; Attendance: 20,000; Referee: (Georgia (country)) Merab Malagradze

9 June 2004 World Cup 2006 Q	Uzbekistan	3–0	Palestine	Tashkent, Uzbekistan
Second Round. Group 2	Bakhtiyor Ashurmatov 6'; Vladimir Shishelov 42'; Server Djeparov 89'	(Report)		Stadium: Pakhtakor; Attendance: 35,000; Referee: (Iran) Masoud Moradi

18 July 2004 Asian Cup 2004	Iraq	0–1	Uzbekistan	Chengdu, China
Group C		Report	Mirjalol Qosimov 21'	Stadium: Sichuan Longquanyi; Attendance: 12,400; Referee: (South Korea) Kwon Jong-Chul

22 July 2004 Asian Cup 2004	Uzbekistan	1–0	Saudi Arabia	Chengdu, China
Group C	Alexander Geynrikh 13'	Report		Stadium: Sichuan Longquanyi; Attendance: 22,000; Referee: (Benin) Coffi Codjia

26 July 2004 Asian Cup 2004	Turkmenistan	0–1	Uzbekistan	Chongqing, China
Group C		Report	Mirjalol Qosimov 58'	Stadium: Chongqing Olympic Sports Center; Attendance: 34,000; Referee: (Syria) Mohammed Kousa

30 July 2004 Asian Cup 2004	Uzbekistan	2–2 (a.e.t.) (3–4 p)	Bahrain	Chengdu, China
Quarterfinal	Alexander Geynrikh 60'; Vladimir Shishelov 86'	Report	A'ala Hubail 71', 76'	Stadium: Sichuan Longquanyi; Attendance: 18,000; Referee: (South Korea) Kwon Jong-Chul
	Penalties
	Andrei Fyodorov (penalty scored); Server Djeparov (penalty scored); Alexander Geynrikh (penalty scored); Marat Bikmoev (penalty missed); Leonid Koshelev (penalty missed)		(penalty scored) Husain Ali; (penalty missed) Mohamed Juma; (penalty scored) Hussain Ali Baba; (penalty scored) Saleh Ahmed Farhan; (penalty scored) A'ala Hubail

8 September 2004 World Cup 2006 Q	Palestine	0–3	Uzbekistan	Al Rayyan, Qatar
Second Round. Group 2		(Report)	Mirjalol Qosimov 9'; Server Djeparov 32'; Marat Bikmoev 78'	Stadium: Umm-Affai; Attendance: 400; Referee: (Singapore) Shamsul Maidin

13 October 2004 World Cup 2006 Q	Iraq	1–2	Uzbekistan	Amman, Jordan
Second Round. Group 2	Qusay Munir 29'	(Report)	Maksim Shatskikh 10'; Alexander Geynrikh 22'	Stadium: Amman International; Attendance: 10,000; Referee: (Singapore) Shamsul Maidin

17 November 2004 World Cup 2006 Q	Uzbekistan	6–1	Chinese Taipei	Tashkent, Uzbekistan
Second Round. Group 2	Alexander Geynrikh 5'; Mirjalol Qosimov 12', 45', 85'; Maksim Shatskikh 18'; Leonid Koshelev 34'	(Report)	Huang Wei-yi 64'	Stadium: Pakhtakor; Attendance: 20,000; Referee: (Syria) Muhsen Basma

=== 2005 ===
9 February 2005 World Cup 2006 Q	Uzbekistan	1–1	Saudi Arabia	Tashkent, Uzbekistan
Third Round. Group A	Anvarjon Soliev 90+3'	(Report)	Sami Al-Jaber 77'	Stadium: Pakhtakor; Attendance: 45,000; Referee: (Japan) Toru Kamikawa

25 March 2005 World Cup 2006 Q	Kuwait	2–1	Uzbekistan	Kuwait City, Kuwait
Third Round. Group A	Bashar Abdullah 7', 62'	(Report)	Alexander Geynrikh 77'	Stadium: Kazma SC; Attendance: 12,000; Referee: (China) Sun Baojie

30 March 2005 World Cup 2006 Q	South Korea	2–1	Uzbekistan	Seoul, Korea Republic
Third Round. Group A	Lee Young-Pyo 55'; Lee Dong-Gook 62'	(Report)	Alexander Geynrikh 79'	Stadium: Seoul World Cup; Attendance: 62,857; Referee: (Lebanon) Tallat Najm

3 June 2005 World Cup 2006 Q	Uzbekistan	1–1	South Korea	Tashkent, Uzbekistan
Third Round. Group A	Maksim Shatskikh 62'	(Report)	Park Chu-Young 90+1'	Stadium: Pakhtakor; Attendance: 40,000; Referee: (Iran) Masoud Moradi

8 June 2005 World Cup 2006 Q	Saudi Arabia	3–0	Uzbekistan	Riyadh, Saudi Arabia
Third Round. Group A	Sami Al-Jaber 8', 60'; Saad Al-Harthi 87'	(Report)		Stadium: King Fahd; Attendance: 72,000; Referee: (China) Huang Junjie

17 August 2005 World Cup 2006 Q	Uzbekistan	3–2	Kuwait	Tashkent, Uzbekistan
Third Round. Group A	Server Djeparov 41' (pen.); Maksim Shatskikh 62'; Anvarjon Soliev 76'	(Report)	Bader Al-Mutawa 16'; Bashar Abdullah 31'	Stadium: Pakhtakor; Attendance: 40,000; Referee: (Malaysia) Subkhiddin Mohd Salleh

3 September 2005 World Cup 2006 Q	Uzbekistan	1 – 0	Bahrain	Tashkent, Uzbekistan
Play-off. 1st leg. Cancelled.	Mirjalol Qosimov 12'	(Report)		Stadium: Pakhtakor; Attendance: 55,000; Referee: (Japan) Toshimitsu Yoshida

8 October 2005 World Cup 2006 Q	Uzbekistan	1–1	Bahrain	Tashkent, Uzbekistan
Play-off. 1st leg.	Maksim Shatskikh 19'	(Report)	Talal Yousef 17'	Stadium: Pakhtakor; Attendance: 55,000; Referee: (Switzerland) Massimo Busacca

12 October 2005 World Cup 2006 Q	Bahrain	0–0	Uzbekistan	Manama, Bahrain
Play-off. 2nd leg.		(Report)		Stadium: National; Attendance: 25,000; Referee: (England) Graham Poll

=== 2006 ===
22 February 2006 Asian Cup 2007 Q	Uzbekistan	5–0	Bangladesh	Tashkent, Uzbekistan
Group F	Alexander Geynrikh 10', 52'; Server Djeparov 24'; Maksim Shatskikh 34', 84'	(Report)		Stadium: Pakhtakor; Attendance: 12,000; Referee: (Bahrain) Abdulhameed Ebrahim

1 March 2006 Asian Cup 2007 Q	Qatar	2–1	Uzbekistan	Doha, Qatar
Group F	Adel Lamy 45'; Ali Nasser 49'	(Report)	Bilal Mohammed 20' (o.g.)	Stadium: Jassim Bin Hamad; Attendance: 7,000; Referee: (China) Sun Baojie

16 August 2006 Asian Cup 2007 Q	Uzbekistan	2–2	Hong Kong	Tashkent, Uzbekistan
Group F	Anvarjon Soliev 18'; Maksim Shatskikh 35'	(Report)	Sham Kwok Keung 66', 87'	Stadium: Pakhtakor; Attendance: 15,000; Referee: (Kuwait) Qasem Shaban

6 September 2006 Asian Cup 2007 Q	Hong Kong	0–0	Uzbekistan	Hong Kong
Group F		(Report)		Stadium: Hong Kong; Attendance: 7,608; Referee: (South Korea) Lee Gi-Young

11 October 2006 Asian Cup 2007 Q	Bangladesh	0–4	Uzbekistan	Chittagong, Bangladesh
Group F		(Report)	Ilyos Zeytulayev 11'; Ulugbek Bakaev 18'; Server Djeparov 22'; Maksim Shatskikh 39' (pen.)	Stadium: Bangladesh Army; Attendance: 120; Referee: (China) Tan Hai

15 November 2006 Asian Cup 2007 Q	Uzbekistan	2–0	Qatar	Tashkent, Uzbekistan
Group F	Leonid Koshelev 31'; Ilyos Zeytulayev 52'	(Report)		Stadium: Pakhtakor; Attendance: 14,000; Referee: (United Arab Emirates) Mohamed Omar Al Saeedi

=== 2007 ===
7 February 2007 Friendly	Uzbekistan	0–0	Azerbaijan	Qarshi, Uzbekistan
		Report		Stadium: Nasaf; Attendance: 10,000; Referee: (Uzbekistan) Ravshan Irmatov

7 March 2007 Alma TV Cup	Azerbaijan	1–0	Uzbekistan	Shymkent, Kazakhstan
	Subašić 55'	Report		Stadium: Kazhymukan Munaitpasov; Attendance: 10,000; Referee: (Kazakhstan) Holmatov

9 March 2007 Alma TV Cup	Kyrgyzstan	0–6	Uzbekistan	Shymkent, Kazakhstan
		Report	Anvarjon Soliev 2'; Ulugbek Bakayev 5' (pen.), 42', 89'; Yannis Mandzukas 63'; Vladimir Shishelov 81'	Stadium: Kazhymukan Munaitpasov; Attendance: 150; Referee: (Kazakhstan) Igor Kister

11 March 2007 Alma TV Cup	Kazakhstan	1–1	Uzbekistan	Almaty, Kazakhstan
	Murat Suyumagambetov 16'	Report	Alexander Geynrikh 35'	Stadium: Central; Attendance: 11,000; Referee: (Kyrgyzstan) Dmitriy Mashentsev

24 March 2007 Friendly	Chinese Taipei	0–1	Uzbekistan	Taipei, Taiwan
		Report	Hikmat Hashimov 52'	Stadium: Chungshan; Attendance: 3,000

27 March 2007 Friendly	China	3–1	Uzbekistan	Macau
	Han Peng 5', 41'	Report	Botir Qoraev 66' (own); Vladimir Shishelov 82'	Stadium: Estádio Campo Desportivo

2 July 2007 Friendly	Iraq	0–2	Uzbekistan	Seoul, Korea Republic
		Report	Aziz Ibragimov 3'; Ulugbek Bakaev 73'	Stadium: Pachju; Attendance: 100

5 July 2007 Friendly	South Korea	2–1	Uzbekistan	Seoul, Korea Republic
	Cho Jae-Jin 5', 19'	Report	Server Djeparov 60' (pen.)	Stadium: Sangam; Attendance: 21,019; Referee: (Thailand) Prayoon Veerapool

11 July 2007 Asian Cup 2007	Iran	2–1	Uzbekistan	Kuala Lumpur, Malaysia
Group C	Jalal Hosseini 55'; Javad Kazemian 78'	Report	Rahman Rezaei 16' (o.g.)	Stadium: Bukit Jalil; Attendance: 1,863; Referee: (Kuwait) Saad Kamil Al-Fadhli

14 July 2007 Asian Cup 2007	Uzbekistan	5–0	Malaysia	Kuala Lumpur, Malaysia
Group C	Maksim Shatskikh 10', 89'; Timur Kapadze 30'; Ulugbek Bakayev 45+2' (pen.); Aziz Ibrahimov 85'	Report		Stadium: Bukit Jalil; Attendance: 7,137; Referee: (Qatar) Abdulrahman Abdou

18 July 2007 Asian Cup 2007	Uzbekistan	3–0	China	Shah Alam, Malaysia
Group C	Maksim Shatskikh 72'; Timur Kapadze 86'; Alexander Geynrikh 90+8'	Report		Stadium: Shah Alam; Attendance: 2,200; Referee: (Kuwait) Saad Kamil Al-Fadhli

22 July 2007 Asian Cup 2007	Saudi Arabia	2–1	Uzbekistan	Jakarta, Indonesia
Quarterfinal	Yasser Al-Qahtani 3'; Ahmed Al-Mousa 75'	Report	Pavel Solomin 82'	Stadium: Gelora Bung Karno; Attendance: 12,000; Referee: (South Korea) Kwon Jong-Chul

22 August 2007 Friendly	Ukraine	2–1	Uzbekistan	Kyiv, Ukraine
	Oleksandr Hladkiy 30'; Ruslan Rotan 65'	Report	Alexander Geynrikh 90+2'	Stadium: V.Lobanovskiy; Attendance: 35,000; Referee: (North Macedonia) Vjacheslav Banari

13 October 2007 World Cup 2010 Q	Uzbekistan	9–0	Chinese Taipei	Tashkent, Uzbekistan
First Round	Maksim Shatskikh 4', 16', 34', 57', 77'; Timur Kapadze 26'; Victor Karpenko 43'; Ulugbek Bakayev 54'; Shavkat Salomov 68'	Report		Stadium: Central Army; Attendance: 7,000; Referee: (United Arab Emirates) Ali Hamad Al-Badwawi

28 October 2007 World Cup 2010 Q	Chinese Taipei	0–2	Uzbekistan	Taipei, Taiwan
First Round		Report	Islom Inomov 79'; Ilhomjon Suyunov 89'	Stadium: Chungshan; Attendance: 800; Referee: (Bangladesh) Tayeb Shamsuzzaman

21 November 2007 Friendly	Uzbekistan	0–0	Estonia	Tashkent, Uzbekistan
		Report		Stadium: Central Army; Attendance: 3,000; Referee: (Uzbekistan) Ravshan Irmatov

22 December 2007 King's Cup 2007	Thailand	3–2	Uzbekistan	Bangkok, Thailand
	Sarayoot Chaikamdee 9' (pen.), 40'; Nataporn Phanrit 90'	Report	Farhod Tadjiyev 44', 60'	Stadium: Rajamangala; Attendance: 3,000

24 December 2007 King's Cup 2007	North Korea	2–2	Uzbekistan	Bangkok, Thailand
	An Chol-Hyok 41'; Kim Kum-Il 90'	Report	Pavel Solomin 53'; Timur Yafarov 65'	Stadium: Rajamangala; Attendance: 3,000

=== 2008 ===
6 February 2008 World Cup 2010 Q	Lebanon	0–1	Uzbekistan	Beirut, Lebanon
Third Round. Group 4		Report	Odil Ahmedov 44'	Stadium: Camille Chamoun Sports City; Attendance: 800; Referee: (Oman) Abdullah Al Hilali

22 March 2008 Friendly	Uzbekistan	4–1	Jordan	Tashkent, Uzbekistan
	Server Djeparov 4'; Islom Inomov 36'; Farhod Tadjiyev 49' (pen.); Zayniddin Tadjiyev 62'	Report	Aala Muhammad 11'	Stadium: MHSK; Attendance: 5,000; Referee: (Uzbekistan) Ravshan Irmatov

26 March 2008 World Cup 2010 Q	Uzbekistan	3–0	Saudi Arabia	Tashkent, Uzbekistan
Third Round. Group 4	Timur Kapadze 45+1'; Maksim Shatskikh 65'; Server Djeparov 67' (pen.)	Report		Stadium: MHSK; Attendance: 17,000; Referee: (Malaysia) Subkhiddin Mohd Salleh

2 June 2008 World Cup 2010 Q	Singapore	3–7	Uzbekistan	Singapore
Third Round. Group 4	Aleksandar Đurić 16'; Mustafic Fahrudin 31' (pen.); John Wilkinson 73'	Report	Timur Kapadze 10'; Victor Karpenko 22'; Server Djeparov 34', 44'; Vitaliy Denisov 42'; Aziz Ibrahimov 62'; Maksim Shatskikh 88'	Stadium: National; Attendance: 28,750; Referee: (United Arab Emirates) Ali Hamad Al-Badwawi

7 June 2008 World Cup 2010 Q	Uzbekistan	3 – 0	Singapore	Tashkent, Uzbekistan
Third Round. Group 4	Alexander Geynrikh 80'	Report		Stadium: MHSK; Attendance: 12,867; Referee: (South Korea) Kim Dong-Jin

14 June 2008 World Cup 2010 Q	Uzbekistan	3–0	Lebanon	Tashkent, Uzbekistan
Third Round. Group 4	Odil Ahmedov 50', 63'; Server Djeparov 90+4'	Report		Stadium: MHSK; Attendance: 7,000; Referee: (Australia) Matthew Breeze

22 June 2008 World Cup 2010 Q	Saudi Arabia	4–0	Uzbekistan	Riyadh, Saudi Arabia
Third Round. Group 4	Abdoh Otaif 5'; Malek Mouath 36', 88'; Saad Al-Harthi 56'	Report		Stadium: King Fahd International; Attendance: 5,000; Referee: (Japan) Yuichi Nishimura

20 August 2008 Friendly	Oman	2–0	Uzbekistan	Muscat, Oman
	Fawzi Bashir 25'; Emad Hawsan 85'	Report		Stadium: Sultan Qaboos Sports Complex; Attendance: 7,000

29 August 2008 Friendly	Uzbekistan	0–0	North Korea	Tashkent, Uzbekistan
		Report		Stadium: MHSK; Attendance: 3,500; Referee: (Uzbekistan) Rustam Saidov

6 September 2008 World Cup 2010 Q	Qatar	3–0	Uzbekistan	Doha, Qatar
Fourth Round. Group A	Majdi Siddiq 37'; Magid Mohamed 73'; Talal Al-Bloushi 86'	Report		Stadium: Jassim Bin Hamad; Attendance: 8,000; Referee: (Malaysia) Subkhiddin Mohd Salleh

10 September 2008 World Cup 2010 Q	Uzbekistan	0–1	Australia	Tashkent, Uzbekistan
Fourth Round. Group A		Report	Scott Chipperfield 26'	Stadium: Pakhtakor; Attendance: 34,000; Referee: (Kuwait) Saad Al Fadhli

11 October 2008 Friendly	South Korea	3–0	Uzbekistan	Suwon, South Korea
	Kee Sung Young 3'; Lee Kyun Ho 72', 85'	Report		Stadium: Suwon; Attendance: 12,000; Referee: (South Korea) Ki Il Jong

15 October 2008 World Cup 2010 Q	Japan	1–1	Uzbekistan	Saitama, Japan
Fourth Round. Group A	Keiji Tamada 40'	Report	Maksim Shatskikh 27'	Stadium: Saitama; Attendance: 55,142; Referee: (United Arab Emirates) Ali Hamad Al-Badwawi

=== 2009 ===
28 January 2009 Asian Cup 2011 Q	United Arab Emirates	0–1	Uzbekistan	Dubai, United Arab Emirates
Group C		Report	Farhod Tadjiyev 30'	Stadium: Al Sharjah; Attendance: 15,000; Referee: (Japan) Yuichi Nishimura

1 February 2009 Friendly	Azerbaijan	1–1	Uzbekistan	Dubai, United Arab Emirates
	Fábio Luís Ramim 63' (pen.)	Report	Ilyos Qurbonov 80'	Stadium: Al-Maktoum; Attendance: 100; Referee: (United Arab Emirates) Ali Hamad Al-Badwawi

11 February 2009 World Cup 2010 Q	Uzbekistan	0–1	Bahrain	Tashkent, Uzbekistan
Fourth Round. Group A		Report	Mahmood Abdulrahman 90+4'	Stadium: Pakhtakor; Attendance: 30,000; Referee: (Malaysia) Subkhiddin Mohd Salleh

28 March 2009 World Cup 2010 Q	Uzbekistan	4–0	Qatar	Tashkent, Uzbekistan
Fourth Round. Group A	Farhod Tadjiyev 34', 45+2', 53'; Anvarjon Soliev 62'	Report		Stadium: Pakhtakor; Attendance: 18,000; Referee: (Iran) Masoud Moradi

1 April 2009 World Cup 2010 Q	Australia	2–0	Uzbekistan	Sydney, Australia
Fourth Round. Group A	Joshua Kennedy 66'; Harry Kewell 73' (pen.)	Report		Stadium: Australia; Attendance: 57,292; Referee: (United Arab Emirates) Ali Hamad Al-Badwawi

1 June 2009 Friendly	Uzbekistan	0–0	Bosnia and Herzegovina	Tashkent, Uzbekistan
		Report		Stadium: Pakhtakor; Attendance: 11,635; Referee: (Uzbekistan) Valentin Kovalenko

6 June 2009 World Cup 2010 Q	Uzbekistan	0–1	Japan	Tashkent, Uzbekistan
Fourth Round. Group A		Report	Shinji Okazaki 9'	Stadium: Pakhtakor; Attendance: 34,000; Referee: (Syria) Muhsen Basma

17 June 2009 World Cup 2010 Q	Bahrain	1–0	Uzbekistan	Madinat 'Isa, Bahrain
Fourth Round. Group A	Mahmood Abdulrahman 73'	Report		Stadium: Bahrain National; Attendance: 14,100; Referee: (Iran) Masoud Moradi

5 September 2009 Friendly	Uzbekistan	0–0	Iran	Tashkent, Uzbekistan
		Report		Stadium: Pakhtakor; Attendance: 7,000; Referee: (Uzbekistan) Valentin Kovalenko

14 November 2009 Asian Cup 2011 Q	Uzbekistan	3–1	Malaysia	Tashkent, Uzbekistan
Group C	Server Djeparov 46'; Alexander Geynrikh 57', 65'	Report	Zaquan Adha 68'	Stadium: JAR; Attendance: 5,000; Referee: (Japan) Masoud Moradi

18 November 2009 Asian Cup 2011 Q	Malaysia	1–3	Uzbekistan	Kuala Lumpur, Malaysia
Group C	Badrol Bakhtiar 73'	Report	Anvar Gafurov 33'; Bahodir Nasimov 59'; Timur Kapadze 74'	Stadium: National; Attendance: 2,000; Referee: (China) Tan Hai

== Head-to-head records ==
Uzbekistan national football team head-to-head records (2000–2009)
Opponent	Pld	W	D	L	GF	GA	GD	Pts	Confederation
Armenia	1	0	0	1	0	2	–2	0	UEFA
Australia	1	0	0	1	0	2	–2	0	AFC
Azerbaijan	5	1	2	2	4	6	–2	5	UEFA
Bahrain	5	2	2	1	5	3	+2	8	AFC
Bangladesh	2	2	0	0	9	0	+9	6	AFC
Belarus	2	0	1	1	3	4	–1	1	UEFA
Bosnia and Herzegovina	2	1	1	0	2	1	+1	4	UEFA
China	2	1	0	1	3	3	0	3	AFC
Chinese Taipei	4	4	0	0	14	0	+14	12	AFC
Estonia	1	0	1	0	0	0	0	1	UEFA
Hong Kong	2	1	1	0	3	1	+2	4	AFC
India	1	1	0	0	2	1	+1	3	AFC
Iran	2	0	1	1	1	2	–1	1	AFC
Iraq	3	2	1	0	4	2	+2	7	AFC
Israel	1	0	0	1	0	2	–2	0	UEFA
Japan	3	0	1	2	2	10	–8	1	AFC
Jordan	2	1	1	0	6	3	+3	4	AFC
Kazakhstan	1	0	1	0	1	1	0	1	UEFA
Kyrgyzstan	1	1	0	0	6	0	+6	3	AFC
South Korea	4	0	1	3	2	8	–6	1	AFC
Kuwait	1	0	0	1	1	2	–1	0	AFC
Latvia	1	1	0	0	3	0	+3	3	UEFA
Lebanon	2	2	0	0	4	0	+4	6	AFC
Malaysia	3	3	0	0	11	2	+9	9	AFC
Mongolia	1	1	0	0	8	1	+7	3	AFC
Oman	2	1	0	1	7	4	+3	3	AFC
Palestine	1	1	0	0	3	0	+3	3	AFC
North Korea	1	0	1	0	0	0	0	1	AFC
Qatar	5	3	2	0	10	4	+6	11	AFC
Saudi Arabia	4	1	1	2	2	10	–8	4	AFC
Singapore	2	2	0	0	10	3	+7	6	AFC
Slovakia	1	0	0	1	1	4	–3	0	UEFA
Thailand	2	0	0	2	3	8	–5	0	AFC
Turkmenistan	3	2	0	1	6	3	+3	6	AFC
Ukraine	1	0	0	1	1	2	–1	0	UEFA
United Arab Emirates	4	1	1	2	5	7	–2	4	AFC
Total	82	35	18	29	142	101	+41	123	

== See also ==
- Uzbekistan national football team
- Uzbekistan national football team results (1992–99)
- Uzbekistan national football team results (2010–19)
- Uzbekistan national football team results – B Matches
