= Uzbekistan national football team results (1992–1999) =

This is a list of football games played by the Uzbekistan national football team between 1992 and 1999.

== Results ==
Key
| Win |
| Draw |
| Defeat |

=== 1992 ===
| 17 June 1992 Central Asian Cup | Tajikistan | 2–2 | Uzbekistan | Dushanbe, Tajikistan |
| | Mukhsin Mukhamadiev 72', 86' | Report | Igor Shkvyrin 62'; Rustam Abdullaev 74' (pen.) | Stadium: Pamir; Attendance: 6,000; Referee: (Kazakhstan) Aleksandr Kulakov |

| 28 June 1992 Central Asian Cup | Uzbekistan | 2–1 | Turkmenistan | Tashkent, Uzbekistan |
| | Ulugbek Ruzimov 8'; Azamat Abduraimov 75' (pen.) | Report | Vitaliy Zolotukhin 85' | Stadium: Pakhtakor; Attendance: 1,300; Referee: (Tajikistan) Yuriy Pekshev |

| 16 July 1992 Central Asian Cup | Kazakhstan | 1–0 | Uzbekistan | Almaty, Kazakhstan |
| | Ruslan Duzmambetov 25' | Report | | Stadium: Central; Attendance: 1,000; Referee: (Tajikistan) Valeriy Urunov |

| 23 August 1992 Central Asian Cup | Uzbekistan | 3–0 | Kyrgyzstan | Tashkent, Uzbekistan |
| | Shukhrat Maksudov 59'; Azamat Abduraimov 62' (pen.), 64' (pen.) | Report | | Stadium: Pakhtakor; Attendance: 1,300; Referee: (Turkmenistan) Konstantin Parzalis |

| 3 October 1992 Central Asian Cup | Kyrgyzstan | 2–6 | Uzbekistan | Bishkek, Kyrgyzstan |
| | Asilbek Momunov 40' (pen.); Oleg Kazmirchuk 65' | Report | Rustam Zabirov 13'; Rustam Abdullaev 22'; Azamat Abduraimov 30', 45' (pen.); Shukhrat Maksudov 74'; Ulugbek Ruzimov 79' | Stadium: Spartak; Attendance: 2,000; Referee: (Kazakhstan) A.Borisov |

| 14 October 1992 Central Asian Cup | Uzbekistan | 1–1 | Kazakhstan | Tashkent, Uzbekistan |
| | Azamat Abduraimov 27' (pen.) | Report | Ruslan Duzmambetov 16' | Stadium: Pakhtakor; Attendance: 35,000; Referee: (Kyrgyzstan) Abdugani Radjabov |

| 3 October 1992 Central Asian Cup | Turkmenistan | 1–0 | Uzbekistan | Ashgabat, Turkmenistan |
| | Çariýar Muhadow 70' | Report | | Stadium: Köpetdag; Attendance: 3,000; Referee: (Kyrgyzstan) Abdugani Radjabov |

=== 1994 ===
| 11 April 1994 Independent's Cup | Uzbekistan | 4–0 | Turkmenistan | Tashkent, Uzbekistan |
| | Shukhrat Maksudov 45'; Abdukahhor Marufaliev 47'; Rustam Abdullaev 53'; Numon Hasanov 71' | Report | | Stadium: Pakhtakor; Attendance: 35,000; Referee: (Kyrgyzstan) Abdugani Radjabov |

| 13 April 1994 Independent's Cup | Uzbekistan | 1–0 | Kazakhstan | Tashkent, Uzbekistan |
| | Aleksandr Tikhonov 77' (pen.) | Report | | Stadium: Pakhtakor; Attendance: 45,000; Referee: (Tajikistan) Abduraim Boboev |

| 17 April 1994 Independent's Cup | Uzbekistan | 1–1 | Tajikistan | Tashkent, Uzbekistan |
| | Igor Cherevchenko 36' (o.g.) | Report | Valentin Shashkov 25' | Stadium: Pakhtakor; Attendance: 25,000; Referee: (Kyrgyzstan) Kadyr Chynnybekov |

| 19 April 1994 Independent's Cup | Uzbekistan | 3–0 | Kyrgyzstan | Tashkent, Uzbekistan |
| | Shukhrat Maksudov 5'; Rustam Durmonov 22'; Abdukahhor Marufaliev 25' | Report | | Stadium: Pakhtakor; Attendance: 30,000; Referee: (Turkmenistan) Allabergen Sapayew |

| 1 October 1994 Asian Games 1994 | Saudi Arabia | 1–4 | Uzbekistan | Hiroshima, Japan |
| Group B | Hamid Al-Johani 90' | Report | Sergey Lebedev 5'; Mirjalol Qosimov 19'; Igor Shkvyrin 26', 43' | Stadium: Regional Park; Attendance: 1,000; Referee: (South Korea) Cha Duk-Hwan |

| 3 October 1994 Asian Games 1994 | Uzbekistan | 5–0 | Malaysia | Hiroshima, Japan |
| Group B | Azamat Abduraimov 24'; Mirjalol Qosimov 31'; Igor Shkvyrin 44', 78'; Shukhrat Maksudov 83' | Report | | Stadium: Regional Park; Attendance: 807; Referee: (United Arab Emirates) Abdelaziz Al-Mulla |

| 5 October 1994 Asian Games 1994 | Hong Kong | 0–1 | Uzbekistan | Hiroshima, Japan |
| Group B | | Report | Azamat Abduraimov 20' | Stadium: Bingo Athletic; Attendance: 929; Referee: (Japan) Yotaro Morizu |

| 7 October 1994 Asian Games 1994 | Uzbekistan | 5–4 | Thailand | Onomichi, Japan |
| Group B | Mirjalol Qosimov 10', 42'; Shukhrat Maksudov 27', 61'; Igor Shkvyrin 66' | Report | Ornsomchit 27', 71'; Phanpraphast 83'; Damrong-Ongtrakul 88' | Stadium: Bingo Athletic; Attendance: 721; Referee: (Kuwait) Radi Al-Haddad |

| 11 October 1994 Asian Games 1994 | Turkmenistan | 0–3 | Uzbekistan | Miyoshi, Japan |
| Quarter-final | | Report | Igor Shkvyrin 15', 33'; Azamat Abduraimov 20' (pen.) | Stadium: Miyoshi Athletic; Attendance: 1,293; Referee: (Kuwait) Radi Al-Haddad |

| 13 October 1994 Asian Games 1994 | Uzbekistan | 1–0 | South Korea | Hiroshima, Japan |
| Semi-final | Azamat Abduraimov 65' | Report | | Stadium: Regional Park; Attendance: 5,077; Referee: (Saudi Arabia) Abdurakhman Zaid |

| 16 October 1994 Asian Games 1994 | China | 2–4 | Uzbekistan | Hiroshima, Japan |
| Final | Hu Zhijun 16'; Li Bing 50' | Report | Igor Shkvyrin 3'; Sergey Lebedev 9'; Azamat Abduraimov 47' (pen.); Shukhrat Maksudov 82' | Stadium: Big Arch; Attendance: 28,687; Referee: (Japan) Masayoshi Okada |

=== 1995 ===
| 20 October 1995 Afro-Asian Cup | Uzbekistan | 2–3 | Nigeria | Tashkent, Uzbekistan |
| | Mirjalol Qosimov 75'; Andrei Fyodorov 87' | Report | Samson Siasia 8'; Victor Ikpeba 66'; Nwankwo Kanu 77' | Stadium: Pakhtakor; Attendance: 50,000; Referee: (United Arab Emirates) Ali Busayim |

| 10 November 1995 Afro-Asian Cup | Nigeria | 1–0 | Uzbekistan | Lagos, Nigeria |
| | Emmanuel Amunike 82' | Report | | Stadium: National; Attendance: 60,000; Referee: (Mali) Sidi Bekae Magassa |

=== 1996 ===
| 8 May 1996 Asian Cup Q | Tajikistan | 4–0 | Uzbekistan | Dushanbe, Tajikistan |
| 1996 AFC Asian Cup qualification | Khakim Fuzaylov 3' (pen.); Alier Ashurmamadov 65', 67'; Arsen Avakov 87' | Report | | Stadium: Pamir; Attendance: 20,000; Referee: (Kazakhstan) Aleksandr Kulakov |

| 19 June 1996 Asian Cup Q | Uzbekistan | 5–0 | Tajikistan | Tashkent, Uzbekistan |
| 1996 AFC Asian Cup qualification | Mirjalol Qosimov 4' (pen.), 33' (pen.); Sergey Andreyev 8'; Igor Shkvyrin 72'; Zafarjon Musabayev 95' | Report | | Stadium: MHSK; Attendance: 15,000; Referee: (Turkmenistan) Eldar Ramazanov |

| 11 September 1996 Friendly | Japan | 1–0 | Uzbekistan | Tokyo, Japan |
| | Motohiro Yamaguchi 6' | Report | | Stadium: Yoyoki National; Attendance: 44,843; Referee: (South Korea) Kim Hwang Taek |

| 19 November 1996 Friendly | United Arab Emirates | 4–2 | Uzbekistan | Abu Dhabi, UAE |
| | Bakheet Saad 30'; Adnan Al-Talyani 63', 70', 87' | Report | Shukhrat Maksudov 60'; Numon Khasanov 74' (pen.) | Stadium: Zayed Sports City; Attendance: 5,000 |

| 22 November 1996 Friendly | United Arab Emirates | 2–0 | Uzbekistan | Abu Dhabi, UAE |
| | Adel Akhmad 16'; Jassem Mohammad 19' | Report | | Stadium: Zayed Sports City; Attendance: 8,000 |

| 6 December 1996 Asian Cup 1996 | Uzbekistan | 2–0 | China | Al Ain, UAE |
| Group C | Igor Shkvyrin 80'; Oleg Shatskikh 89' | Report | | Stadium: Tahnoun Bin Mohamed; Attendance: 3,000; Referee: (Saudi Arabia) Abdul Rahman Al-Zeid |

| 9 December 1996 Asian Cup 1996 | Japan | 4–0 | Uzbekistan | Al Ain, UAE |
| Group C | Hiroshi Nanami 8'; Kazuyoshi Miura 38'; Masakiyo Maezono 86', 88' | Report | | Stadium: Tahnoun Bin Mohamed; Attendance: 3,000; Referee: (Iran) Jalal Moradi |

| 12 December 1996 Asian Cup 1996 | Uzbekistan | 1–2 | Syria | Al Ain, UAE |
| Group C | Sergey Lebedev 54' (pen.) | Report | Nader Joukhadar 49'; Ali Al-Sheikh Dib 74' | Stadium: Tahnoun Bin Mohamed; Attendance: 2,000; Referee: (United Arab Emirates) Ali Bujsaim |

=== 1997 ===
| 9 May 1997 World Cup 1998 Q | Yemen | 0–1 | Uzbekistan | Sana'a, Yemen |
| First round. Group 5 | | Report | Numon Khasanov 30' (pen.) | Stadium: Althawra Sports City; Attendance: 28,000; Referee: (Jordan) Yousef Sawarkeh |

| 25 May 1997 World Cup 1998 Q | Uzbekistan | 6–0 | Cambodia | Tashkent, Uzbekistan |
| First round. Group 5 | Nikolai Shirshov 6'; Numon Khasanov 17' (pen.); Sergey Lebedev 39', 75'; Andrei Fedorov 45'; Jafar Irismetov 88' | Report | | Stadium: Pakhtakor; Attendance: 53,000; Referee: (Kyrgyzstan) Viktor Kolpakov |

| 1 June 1997 World Cup 1998 Q | Indonesia | 1–1 | Uzbekistan | Jakarta, Indonesia |
| First round. Group 5 | Sudirman Sudirman 35' (pen.) | Report | Oleg Shatskikh 70' | Stadium: Gelora Bung Karno; Attendance: 30,000; Referee: (South Korea) Kim Kwang-Jong |

| 20 June 1997 World Cup 1998 Q | Uzbekistan | 3–0 | Indonesia | Tashkent, Uzbekistan |
| First round. Group 5 | Oleg Shatskikh 10'; Shukhrat Maksudov 35', 88' | Report | | Stadium: Pakhtakor; Attendance: 55,000; Referee: (Iran) Jalal Moradi |

| 29 June 1997 World Cup 1998 Q | Cambodia | 1–4 | Uzbekistan | Phnom Penh, Cambodia |
| First round. Group 5 | Hok Sochetra 12' | Report | Abdukahhor Marifaliev 2', 60'; Ravshan Bozorov 9', 30' | Stadium: Olympic; Attendance: 12,000; Referee: (Pakistan) Abdul Shakoor Baloch |

| 24 August 1997 World Cup 1998 Q | Uzbekistan | 5–1 | Yemen | Tashkent, Uzbekistan |
| First round. Group 5 | Igor Shkvirin 6', 68'; Oleg Shatskikh 61', 80'; Ravshan Bozorov 67' | Report | Mohammed Zughair 31' | Stadium: Pakhtakor; Attendance: 20,000; Referee: (Bahrain) Sultan Mujalli Al Aalaq |

| 7 September 1997 World Cup 1998 Q | Japan | 6–3 | Uzbekistan | Tokyo, Japan |
| Final round. Group B | Akita Yutaka 1'; Kazuyoshi Miura 4', 23', 64'; Hidetoshi Nakata 41'; Shoji Jo 65' | Report | Oleg Shatskikh 56', 78'; Andrei Fyodorov 70' (pen.) | Stadium: Olympic; Attendance: 54,328; Referee: (Saudi Arabia) Abdul Rahman Al-Zaid |

| 12 September 1997 World Cup 1998 Q | South Korea | 2–1 | Uzbekistan | Seoul, Korea Republic |
| Final round. Group B | Choi Yong-Soo 15'; Lee Sang-Yoon 87' | Report | Oleg Shatskikh 74' | Stadium: Olympic; Attendance: 70,000; Referee: (China) Wei Jihong |

| 20 September 1997 World Cup 1998 Q | Kazakhstan | 1–1 | Uzbekistan | Almaty, Kazakhstan |
| Final round. Group B | Ruslan Baltiyev 84' (pen.) | Report | Oleg Shatskikh 85' | Stadium: Central; Attendance: 12,000; Referee: (Lebanon) Ahmad Nabil Ayad |

| 27 September 1997 World Cup 1998 Q | Uzbekistan | 2–3 | United Arab Emirates | Tashkent, Uzbekistan |
| Final round. Group B | Nikolai Shirshov 10'; Ravshan Bozorov 90' | Report | Zuhair Bakheet 51'; Bakhit Alabadla 60'; Adnan Al Talyani 85' | Stadium: Pakhtakor; Attendance: 50,000; Referee: (Iran) Jalal Moradi |

| 11 October 1997 World Cup 1998 Q | Uzbekistan | 1–1 | Japan | Tashkent, Uzbekistan |
| Final round. Group B | Bahtiyor Kambaraliev 30' | Report | Wagner Lopes 89' | Stadium: Pakhtakor; Attendance: 54,000; Referee: (Bahrain) Sultan Mujalli Al Aalaq |

| 18 October 1997 World Cup 1998 Q | Uzbekistan | 1–5 | South Korea | Tashkent, Uzbekistan |
| Final round. Group B | Andrei Fedorov 67' (pen.) | Report | Choi Yong-Soo 19', 41'; Yoo Sang-Chul 38'; Ko Jeong-Woon 57'; Kim Do-Hoon 70' | Stadium: Pakhtakor; Attendance: 38,000; Referee: (Iraq) AbdulKhudheir AbdulHussein |

| 25 October 1997 World Cup 1998 Q | Uzbekistan | 4–0 | Kazakhstan | Tashkent, Uzbekistan |
| Final round. Group B | Igor Shkvirin 16', 32'; Andrei Fedorov 43' (pen.); Mirjalol Qosimov 72' | Report | | Stadium: Pakhtakor; Attendance: 25,000; Referee: (Oman) Hassan Al Ajmi |

| 2 November 1997 World Cup 1998 Q | United Arab Emirates | 0–0 | Uzbekistan | Abu Dhabi, UAE |
| Final round. Group B | | Report | | Stadium: Zayed Sports City; Attendance: 30,000; Referee: (Syria) Khaled Dalu |

=== 1998 ===
| 24 April 1998 Friendly | Azerbaijan | 2–1 | Uzbekistan | Baku, Azerbaijan |
| | Yunis Huseynov 75'; Narvik Sirkhayev 89' | Report | Mirjalol Qosimov 90' | Stadium: Tofiq Bahramov; Attendance: 8,000; Referee: (Azerbaijan) Khagani Mamedov |

| 16 November 1998 Friendly | India | 0–0 | Uzbekistan | Delhi, India |
| | | Report | | Stadium: Ambedkar; Attendance: 15,000 |

| 19 November 1998 Friendly | India | 0–4 | Uzbekistan | Calcutta, India |
| | | Report | Aleksandr Khvostunov 8'; Sergey Lebedev 30' (pen.); Nagmetulla Kutibayev 35'; Rashidjon Gafurov 48' | Stadium: Salt Lake; Attendance: 10,000 |

| 3 December 1998 Asian Games 1998 | Uzbekistan | 3–3 | Kuwait | Chiang Mai, Thailand |
| First round. Group G | Mirjalol Qosimov 4'; Aleksandr Khvostunov 66'; Andrey Akopyants 75' | Report | Jasem Al-Huwaidi 43'; Faraj Laheeb 78', 90' | Stadium: 700th Anniversary; Attendance: 1,000; Referee: (China) Yun Lu |

| 5 December 1998 Asian Games 1998 | Mongolia | 0–15 | Uzbekistan | Chiang Mai, Thailand |
| First round. Group G | | Report | Sergey Lebedev 7' (pen.), 18' (pen.), 38', 45'; Igor Shkvyrin 9', 15', 20'; Andrey Akopyants 23'; Nagmetulla Kutibayev 29', 33', 47'; Mirjalol Qosimov 53', 57', 77'; Shukhratjon Rakhmonqulov 83' | Stadium: 700th Anniversary; Attendance: 1,000; Referee: (China) Yun Lu |

| 7 December 1998 Asian Games 1998 | Uzbekistan | 4–0 | North Korea | Bangkok, Thailand |
| Second round. Group 1 | Nikolay Shirshov 16', 76'; Igor Shkvyrin 60'; Andrey Akopyants 66' | Report | | Stadium: Supachalasai Stadium; Attendance: 1,000 |

| 9 December 1998 Asian Games 1998 | India | 0–2 | Uzbekistan | Bangkok, Thailand |
| Second round. Group 1 | | Report | Igor Shkvyrin 35'; Shukhratjon Rakhmonqulov 49' | Stadium: Supachalasai; Attendance: 1,000 |

| 11 December 1998 Asian Games 1998 | Uzbekistan | 1–1 | Turkmenistan | Bangkok, Thailand |
| Second round. Group 1 | Nagmetulla Kutibayev 37' | Report | Muslim Agayew 72' | Stadium: Supachalasai; Attendance: 1,000 |

| 14 December 1998 Asian Games 1998 | Iran | 4–0 | Uzbekistan | Bangkok, Thailand |
| Quarter final | Ali Mousavi 29'; Ali Daei 83', 88', 90' | Report | | Stadium: Supachalasai; Attendance: 50,000; Referee: (Thailand) Pirom Unpraset |

=== 1999 ===
| 11 July 1999 Friendly | Uzbekistan | 3–0 | Malaysia | Samarkand, Uzbekistan |
| | Nikolay Shirshov 30'; Davron Fayziev 58'; Mirjalol Qosimov 61' (pen.) | Report | | Stadium: Dinamo; Attendance: 20,000; Referee: (Uzbekistan) Rashid Aytekov |

| 24 July 1999 Friendly | Thailand | 1–0 | Uzbekistan | Bangkok, Thailand |
| | Choketawee Promrut 13' | Report | | Stadium: Supachalasai; Attendance: 30,000; Referee: (Thailand) Hanlumyang Panya |

| 18 August 1999 Friendly | Uzbekistan | 5–1 | Azerbaijan | Samarkand, Uzbekistan |
| | Ilkhom Sharipov 6' (pen.); Maksim Shatskikh 25', 39', 58'; Vladimir Baranov 83' | Report | Zaur Tagi-Zade 47' | Stadium: Dinamo; Attendance: 10,000; Referee: (Uzbekistan) Gayrat Karimov |

| 21 November 1999 2000 Asian Cup Q | Bangladesh | 0–6 | Uzbekistan | Abu Dhabi, UAE |
| Group 3 | | Report | Mirjalol Qosimov 22'; Otabek Pirmatov 42'; Fevzi Davletov 46'; Maksim Shatskikh 52', 76'; Abdukahhor Marifaliev 89' | Stadium: Tahnoun bin Mohammed; Attendance: 15,000; Referee: (Saudi Arabia) Rashid Al-Hamdan |

| 23 November 1999 2000 Asian Cup Q | Sri Lanka | 0–6 | Uzbekistan | Abu Dhabi, UAE |
| Group 3 | | Report | Jafar Irismetov 3', 21'; Fevzi Davletov 28'; Nikolay Shirshov 29', 55'; Ravshan Bozorov 71' | Stadium: Tahnoun bin Mohammed; Referee: (Malaysia) Selearajan Subraman |

| 25 November 1999 2000 Asian Cup Q | India | 2–3 | Uzbekistan | Abu Dhabi, UAE |
| Group 3 | Jo Paul Ancheri 18'; Inivalappil Mani Vijayan 55' | Report | Shukhratjon Rakhmonqulov 17'; Andrei Fyodorov 77'; Nikolay Shirshov 86' | Stadium: Tahnoun bin Mohammed |

| 27 November 1999 2000 Asian Cup Q | United Arab Emirates | 0–1 | Uzbekistan | Abu Dhabi, UAE |
| Group 3 | | Report | Maksim Shatskikh 71' | Stadium: Tahnoun bin Mohammed; Attendance: 23,000; Referee: (Malaysia) Selearajan Subramaniam |

== See also ==
- Uzbekistan national football team
- Uzbekistan national football team results (2000–09)
- Uzbekistan national football team results (2010–19)
- Uzbekistan national football team results – B Matches
