= Uzbekistan national football team results (2010–2019) =

Football team results

This is a list of football games played by the Uzbekistan national football team between 2010 and 2019.

== Record by opponent ==
As of 19 November 2019 after the match against Palestine.

Team	Pld	W	D	L	GF	GA	GD	WPCT
Albania	1	0	0	1	0	1	−1	0.00
Armenia	1	0	0	1	1	3	−2	0.00
Australia	2	0	1	1	0	6	−6	0.00
Azerbaijan	2	0	2	0	0	0	0	0.00
Bahrain	5	3	2	0	10	3	+7	60.00
Burkina Faso	1	1	0	0	1	0	+1	100.00
Canada	1	0	0	1	1	2	−1	0.00
China	7	3	1	3	8	7	+1	42.86
Estonia	1	0	1	0	3	3	0	0.00
Georgia	1	0	1	0	2	2	0	0.00
Hong Kong	2	1	1	0	2	0	+2	50.00
Iraq	4	2	2	0	3	1	+2	50.00
Iran	7	1	0	6	1	7	−6	14.29
Jordan	9	5	3	1	12	8	+4	55.56
Japan	4	1	1	2	4	8	−4	25.00
Kyrgyzstan	3	3	0	0	10	1	+9	100.00
South Korea	9	0	3	6	8	19	−11	0.00
Saudi Arabia	3	1	0	2	5	8	−3	33.33
Kuwait	3	2	0	1	5	2	+3	66.67
Lebanon	4	2	2	0	4	1	+3	50.00
Montenegro	1	0	0	1	0	1	−1	0.00
Morocco	1	0	0	1	0	2	−2	0.00
New Zealand	1	1	0	0	3	1	+2	100.00
Oman	3	1	0	2	2	2	0	33.33
Philippines	2	2	0	0	6	1	+5	100.00
Palestine	3	2	0	1	3	2	+1	66.67
North Korea	7	6	0	1	14	5	+9	85.71
Qatar	7	6	0	1	12	4	+8	85.71
Senegal	1	0	1	0	1	1	0	0.00
Singapore	1	1	0	0	3	1	+2	100.00
Syria	4	2	1	1	4	2	+2	50.00
Thailand	1	1	0	0	2	0	+2	100.00
Tajikistan	2	2	0	0	4	0	+4	100.00
Turkmenistan	1	1	0	0	4	0	+4	100.00
Turkey	1	0	0	1	0	2	−2	0.00
United Arab Emirates	7	1	2	4	8	8	0	14.29
Ukraine	1	0	0	1	0	2	−2	0.00
Uruguay	2	0	0	2	0	6	−6	0.00
Vietnam	2	2	0	0	6	1	+5	100.00
Yemen	3	3	0	0	9	1	+8	100.00
Total	121	56	24	41	161	124	+37	46.28

Source: Results

== Results ==
Key
Win
Draw
Defeat

=== 2010 ===
3 March 2010 Asian Cup 2011 qualification	Uzbekistan	0–1	United Arab Emirates	Tashkent, Uzbekistan
Group C		Report	Al Manhali 90+2'	Stadium: Pakhtakor; Attendance: 20,000; Referee: (Bangladesh) Tayeb Hasan Shamsuzzaman

25 May 2010 Friendly	Armenia	3–1	Uzbekistan	Yerevan, Armenia
	Henrikh Mkhitaryan 67'; Edgar Manucharyan 18' (pen.), 28'	Report	Alexander Geynrikh 67'	Stadium: Hanrapetakan; Attendance: 10,000; Referee: (Georgia (country)) Levan Kvaratskhelia

11 August 2010 Friendly	Albania	1–0	Uzbekistan	Durrës, Albania
	Hamdi Salihi 14'	Report		Stadium: Niko Dovana; Attendance: 17,000; Referee: (North Macedonia) Radonivic

7 September 2010 Friendly	Estonia	3–3	Uzbekistan	Tallinn, Estonia
	Ats Purje 25'; Konstantin Vassiljev 62', 71' (pen.)	Report	Maksim Shatskikh 40'; Alexander Geynrikh 55'; Alo Bärengrub 86' (o.g.)	Stadium: A. Le Coq Arena; Attendance: 2,055; Referee: (Wales) Hugh Jones

9 October 2010 Friendly	Saudi Arabia	4–0	Uzbekistan	Jeddah, Saudi Arabia
	Mohanad Aseri 30' (pen.), 45'; Taisir Al-Jassim 58'; Saleh Basheer 87'	Report		Stadium: Prince Abdullah al-Faisal; Referee: (Qatar) Dowsari

12 October 2010 Friendly	Bahrain	2–4	Uzbekistan	Riffa, Bahrain
	Faouzi Mubarak Aaish 30'; Hussain Salman 53'	Report	Olim Navkarov 6'; Alexander Geynrikh 13'; Odil Ahmedov 41'; Maksim Shatskikh 45'	Stadium: Bahrain National; Referee: (Saudi Arabia) Abdulrahman Amri

25 December 2010 Friendly	Bahrain	1–1	Uzbekistan	Dubai, UAE
	Salman Isa 90+4'	Report	Alexander Geynrikh 11'	Stadium: Al-Maktoum

=== 2011 ===
2 January 2011 Friendly	Jordan	2–2	Uzbekistan	Dubai, UAE
	Amer Deeb 33'; Odai Al-Saify 75'	Report	Jasur Hasanov 70'; Olim Navkarov 77'	Stadium: Sharjah

7 January 2011 Asian Cup 2011	Qatar	0-2	Uzbekistan	Doha, Qatar
Group A		Report	Odil Ahmedov 58'; Server Djeparov 77'	Stadium: Khalifa International; Attendance: 37,143; Referee: (Japan) Yuichi Nishimura

12 January 2011 Asian Cup 2011	Uzbekistan	2–1	Kuwait	Doha, Qatar
Group A	Maksim Shatskikh 41'; Server Djeparov 65'	Report	Bader Al-Mutwa 49' (pen.)	Stadium: Al Gharafa; Attendance: 3,481; Referee: (Bahrain) Nawaf Shukralla

16 January 2011 Asian Cup 2011	China	2–2	Uzbekistan	Doha, Qatar
Group A	Yu Hai 6'; Hao Junmin 56'	Report	Odil Ahmedov 30'; Alexander Geynrikh 47'	Stadium: Al Gharafa; Attendance: 3,529; Referee: (Oman) Abdullah Al Hilali

21 January 2011 Asian Cup 2011	Uzbekistan	2–1	Jordan	Doha, Qatar
Quarterfinal	Ulugbek Bakayev 47', 49'	Report	Bashar Bani Yaseen 58'	Stadium: Khalifa International; Attendance: 16,073; Referee: (Singapore) Abdul Malik

25 January 2011 Asian Cup 2011	Uzbekistan	0–6	Australia	Doha, Qatar
Semifinal		Report	Harry Kewell 5'; Sasa Ognenovski 35'; David Carney 65'; Brett Emerton 74'; Carl Valeri 82'; Robbie Kruse 83'	Stadium: Khalifa International; Attendance: 24,826; Referee: (United Arab Emirates) Ali Al Badwawi

28 January 2011 Asian Cup 2011	Uzbekistan	2–3	South Korea	Doha, Qatar
3d place match	Alexander Geynrikh 45' (pen.), 54'	Report	Koo Ja-Cheol 18'; Ji Dong-Won 28', 39'	Stadium: Jassim Bin Hamad; Attendance: 8,199; Referee: (Singapore) Abdul Malik Bashir

25 March 2011 Friendly	Montenegro	1–0	Uzbekistan	Podgorica, Montenegro
	Simon Vukčević 90'	Report		Stadium: Podgorica City; Attendance: 7,000; Referee: (Serbia) Vlado Glojovic

1 June 2011 Friendly	Ukraine	2–0	Uzbekistan	Kyiv, Ukraine
	Anatoliy Tymoshchuk 55'; Andriy Voronin 60'	Report		Stadium: Lobanovsky Dynamo; Attendance: 5,000; Referee: (Turkey) Halis Ozkahya

4 June 2011 Friendly	China	1–0	Uzbekistan	Kunming, China
	Gao Lin 65'	Report		Stadium: Tuodong; Attendance: 40,000; Referee: (South Korea) Ko Hyon Jin

23 July 2011 World Cup 2014 qualification	Uzbekistan	4–0	Kyrgyzstan	Tashkent, Uzbekistan
Second Round	Alexandr Geynrikh 28'; Marat Bikmaev 49'; Server Djeparov 56'; Ulugbek Bakayev 90+2'	Report		Stadium: Pakhtakor; Referee: (Qatar) Abdullah Balideh

28 July 2011 World Cup 2014 qualification	Kyrgyzstan	0–3	Uzbekistan	Bishkek, Kyrgyzstan
Second Round		Report	Victor Karpenko 47'; Bahodir Nasimov 65', 90'	Stadium: Spartak; Attendance: 14,700; Referee: (Bahrain) Ali Abdulnabi

2 September 2011 World Cup 2014 qualification	Tajikistan	0–1	Uzbekistan	Tursunzoda, Tajikistan
Third Round. Group C		Report	Maksim Shatskikh 72'	Stadium: Metallurg; Attendance: 15,000; Referee: (China) Tan Hai

6 September 2011 World Cup 2014 qualification	Uzbekistan	1–1	Japan	Tashkent, Uzbekistan
Third Round. Group C	Server Djeparov 8'	Report	Shinji Okazaki 65'	Stadium: Pakhtakor; Attendance: 32,000; Referee: (Saudi Arabia) Khalil Al Ghamdi

11 October 2011 World Cup 2014 qualification	North Korea	0–1	Uzbekistan	Pyongyang, North Korea
Third Round. Group C		Report	Alexander Geynrikh 15'	Stadium: Yanggakdo Stadium; Attendance: 29,000; Referee: (Iran) Alireza Faghani

11 November 2011 World Cup 2014 qualification	Uzbekistan	1–0	North Korea	Tashkent, Uzbekistan
Third Round. Group C	Timur Kapadze 49'	Report		Stadium: Pakhtakor; Attendance: 27,525; Referee: (Lebanon) Andre El Haddad

15 November 2011 World Cup 2014 qualification	Uzbekistan	3–0	Tajikistan	Tashkent, Uzbekistan
Third Round. Group C	Sanzhar Tursunov 34'; Odil Ahmedov 60'; Alexander Geynrikh 72'	Report		Stadium: Pakhtakor; Attendance: 5,325; Referee: (United Arab Emirates) Mohamed Zarouni

=== 2012 ===
16 January 2012 Friendly	Kuwait	1–0	Uzbekistan	Kuwait City, Kuwait
	Bader Al-Mutwa 86'	Report		Stadium: Al Kuwait Sports Club

29 January 2012 Friendly	United Arab Emirates	1–0	Uzbekistan	Dubai, UAE
	Ismaeel Matar 71'	Report		Stadium: Sheikh Zayed; Referee: (Oman) Al-Rawahi

25 February 2012 Friendly	South Korea	4–2	Uzbekistan	Jeonju, Korea Republic
	Lee Dong-Guk 19', 45'; Kim Chi-Woo 46', 91'	Report	Ibrokhim Rakhimov 78'; Stanislav Andreev 83' (pen.)	Stadium: Jeonju World Cup; Attendance: 28,931; Referee: (Thailand) Chaiya Mahapab

29 February 2012 World Cup 2014 qualification	Japan	0–1	Uzbekistan	Aichi, Japan
Third Round. Group C		Report; Summary	Aleksandr Shadrin 54'	Stadium: Toyota; Attendance: 42,720; Referee: (Qatar) Abdullah Balideh

3 June 2012 World Cup 2014 qualification	Uzbekistan	0–1	Iran	Tashkent, Uzbekistan
Fourth Round. Group A		Report	Mohammad Reza Khalatbari 90+4'	Stadium: JAR; Attendance: 9,000; Referee: (Japan) Yuichi Nishimura

8 June 2012 World Cup 2014 qualification	Lebanon	1–1	Uzbekistan	Beirut, Lebanon
Fourth Round. Group A	Ali Al Saadi 36'	Report	Jasur Hasanov 12'	Stadium: Camille Chamoun Sports City; Attendance: 15,000; Referee: (Oman) Abdullah Al Hilali

13 August 2012 Friendly	Jordan	0–1	Uzbekistan	Amman, Jordan
		Report	Timur Kapadze 78'	Stadium: King Abdulla; Attendance: 1,500; Referee: (Syria) Masoud Tufaylieh

15 August 2012 Friendly	Jordan	2–0	Uzbekistan	Amman, Jordan
	Ahmad Hayel 57'; Hassan Abdulfattah 68' (pen.)	Report		Stadium: King Abdulla; Attendance: 2,100; Referee: (Syria) Feras Tawell

7 September 2012 Friendly	Uzbekistan	3–0	Kuwait	Tashkent, Uzbekistan
	Sanzhar Tursunov 17'; Alexander Geynrikh 45+1', 46'	Report		Stadium: Pakhtakor; Referee: (Uzbekistan) Ravshan Irmatov

11 September 2012 World Cup 2014 qualification	Uzbekistan	2–2	South Korea	Tashkent, Uzbekistan
Fourth Round. Group A	Ki Sung-Yueng 13' (o.g.); Sanjar Tursunov 59'	Report	Kwak Tae-Hwi 44'; Lee Dong-Gook 58'	Stadium: Pakhtakor; Attendance: 33,000; Referee: (Australia) Benjamin Williams

12 October 2012 Friendly	United Arab Emirates	2–2	Uzbekistan	Dubai, UAE
	Ismaeel Matar 25'; Saeed Kathiri 62'	Report	Sanjar Tursunov 45+2'; Server Djeparov 66'	Stadium: Maktoum Bin Rashid Al Maktoum Stadium; Attendance: 1,500; Referee: (Bahrain) Rashid Kaabi

16 October 2012 World Cup 2014 qualification	Qatar	0–1	Uzbekistan	Doha, Qatar
Fourth Round. Group A		Report	Sanzhar Tursunov 13'	Stadium: Jassim Bin Hamad; Attendance: 11,260; Referee: (China) Tan Hai

14 November 2012 World Cup 2014 qualification	Iran	0–1	Uzbekistan	Tehran, Iran
Fourth Round. Group A		Report	Ulugbek Bakayev 71'	Stadium: Azadi; Attendance: 43,700; Referee: (United Arab Emirates) Ali Badwawi

=== 2013 ===
1 February 2013 Friendly	Uzbekistan	0–0	Azerbaijan	Dubai, UAE
18:00 AZT (UTC+4)		(Report)		Stadium: The Sevens; Attendance: 100; Referee: Ammar Al Junaibi (UAE)

6 February 2013 Asian Cup 2015 qualification	Uzbekistan	0–0	Hong Kong	Tashkent, Uzbekistan
Group E		Report		Stadium: Pakhtakor; Attendance: 16,287; Referee: (Bahrain) Ali Abdulnabi

22 March 2013 Asian Cup 2015 qualification	United Arab Emirates	2–1	Uzbekistan	Abu Dhabi, UAE
Group E	Ahmed Khalil 58'; Ali Mabkhout 61'	Report	Shohruh Gadoev 16'	Stadium: Mohammed Bin Zayed; Attendance: 21,357; Referee: (China) Tan Hai

26 March 2013 World Cup 2014 qualification	Uzbekistan	1–0	Lebanon	Tashkent, Uzbekistan
Fourth Round. Group A	Server Djeparov 63'	Report		Stadium: Bunyodkor; Attendance: 31,197; Referee: (Singapore) Malik Abdul Bashir

6 June 2013 Friendly	China	1–2	Uzbekistan	Hohhot, China
	Wang Yongpo 32'	Report	Ulugbek Bakayev 45'; Server Djeparov 54'	Stadium: Tianhe; Attendance: 15,000

11 June 2013 World Cup 2014 qualification	South Korea	1–0	Uzbekistan	Seoul, Korea Republic
Fourth Round. Group A	Akmal Shorakhmedov 63' (o.g.)	report		Stadium: Seoul World Cup; Attendance: 50,699; Referee: (Japan) Minoru Tōjō

18 June 2013 World Cup 2014 qualification	Uzbekistan	5–1	Qatar	Tashkent, Uzbekistan
Fourth Round. Group A	Bahodir Nasimov 60', 74'; Oleg Zoteev 72'; Odil Ahmedov 87'; Ulugbek Bakayev 90+1'	report	Abdulgadir Ilyas Bakur 37'	Stadium: Bunyodkor; Attendance: 34,000; Referee: (Australia) Peter Green

6 September 2013 World Cup 2014 qualification	Jordan	1–1	Uzbekistan	Amman, Jordan
Fifth Round. Play-off	Mossab Al-Laham 30'	report	Server Djeparov 35'	Stadium: Amman International; Attendance: 16,890; Referee: (Japan) Yuichi Nishimura

10 September 2013 World Cup 2014 qualification	Uzbekistan	1–1 (a.e.t.) (8–9 p)	Jordan	Tashkent, Uzbekistan
Fifth Round. Play-off	Anzur Ismailov 5'	report	Saeed Murjan 42'	Stadium: Pakhtakor; Attendance: 25,621; Referee: (Australia) Ben Williams
	Penalties
	Odil Ahmedov (penalty missed); Server Djeparov (penalty scored); Timur Kapadze (penalty scored); Islom Tukhtakhodjaev (penalty scored); Igor Sergeev (penalty scored); Akmal Shorakhmedov (penalty scored); Vitaliy Denisov (penalty scored); Ivan Nagaev (penalty scored); Sanzhar Tursunov (penalty scored); Anzur Ismailov (penalty missed)		(penalty scored) Anas Bani Yaseen; (penalty scored) Odai Al-Saify; (penalty scored) Abdallah Deeb; (penalty scored) Saeed Murjan; (penalty missed) Ahmad Hayel; (penalty scored) Adnan Adous; (penalty scored) Mohammad Mustafa; (penalty scored) Amer Deeb; (penalty scored) Oday Zahran; (penalty scored) Mohammad Al-Dmeiri

15 October 2013 Asian Cup 2015 qualification	Uzbekistan	3–1	Vietnam	Tashkent, Uzbekistan
Group E	Sardor Rashidov 69'; Âu Văn Hoàn 74' (o.g.); Igor Sergeev 90+2'	Report	Nguyen Trong Hoang 77'	Stadium: Pakhtakor Markaziy; Attendance: 5,675; Referee: (Iran) Mohsen Torky

15 November 2013 Asian Cup 2015 qualification	Vietnam	0–3	Uzbekistan	Hanoi, Vietnam
Group E		Report	Vokhid Shodiev 40'; Igor Sergeev 46'; Sardor Rashidov 89'	Stadium: Mỹ Đình National; Attendance: 9,000; Referee: (South Korea) Kim Jong-Hyeok

19 November 2013 Asian Cup 2015 qualification	Hong Kong	0–2	Uzbekistan	Hong Kong
Group E		Report	Vokhid Shodiev 84'; Odil Ahmedov 89'	Stadium: Hong Kong; Attendance: 5,679; Referee: (Bahrain) Nawaf Shukralla

=== 2014 ===
5 March 2014 Asian Cup 2015 qualification	Uzbekistan	1–1	United Arab Emirates	Tashkent, Uzbekistan
Group E	Igor Sergeev 85'	Report	Ismail Al Hammadi 67'	Stadium: Bunyodkor; Attendance: 15,000; Referee: (South Korea) Kim Sang-Woo

27 May 2014 Friendly	Uzbekistan	0–1	Oman	Olmaliq, Uzbekistan
		Report	Ahmed Mubarak Al-Mahaijri 20'	Stadium: Metallurg Stadium; Attendance: 6,644; Referee: (Uzbekistan) Vladislav Tseytlin

29 May 2014 Friendly	Uzbekistan	0–1	Oman	Tashkent, Uzbekistan
19:00 (UTC+5)		Report	Eid Al-Farsi 30'	Stadium: JAR; Attendance: 1,415; Referee: (Uzbekistan) Ravshan Irmatov

20 August 2014 Friendly	Azerbaijan	0–0	Uzbekistan	Baku, Azerbaijan
19:00 (UTC+5)		Report		Stadium: Bakcell Arena; Attendance: 4,500; Referee: (Georgia (country)) George Vadachkoria

4 September 2014 Friendly	Uzbekistan	2–0	Jordan	Tashkent, Uzbekistan
19:00 (UTC+5)	Igor Sergeev 56'; Dilshod Juraev 90'	Report		Stadium: Pakhtakor; Attendance: 3,000; Referee: (Uzbekistan) Sherzod Qosimov

8 September 2014 Friendly	Uzbekistan	3–1	New Zealand	Tashkent, Uzbekistan
19:00 (UTC+5)	Odil Ahmedov 41', 58'; Server Djeparov 77'	Report	Jeremy Brockie 86'	Stadium: Pakhtakor; Attendance: 3,000; Referee: (Uzbekistan) Ravshan Irmatov

6 October 2014 Friendly	Qatar	3–0	Uzbekistan	Doha, Qatar
	Sebastián Soria 18'; Hassan Al Haidos 43'; Meshal Abdullah 67'	Report		Stadium: Abdullah bin Khalifa; Attendance: 6,000; Referee: (Hungary) Shandor Szabo

10 October 2014 Friendly	Uzbekistan	0–0	Bahrain	Dubai, UAE
		Report		Stadium: Maktoum Bin Rashid Al Maktoum; Attendance: 100

14 October 2014 Friendly	United Arab Emirates	0–4	Uzbekistan	Dubai, UAE
		Report	Timur Kapadze 30'; Mohanad Salem 45+1' (o.g.); Server Djeparov 68'; Navruzbek Olimov 90+5'	Stadium: Dubai Club Stadium; Referee: (Egypt) Ibrakhim Ali

13 December 2014 Friendly	Uzbekistan	1–0	Palestine	Dubai, UAE
	Sardor Rashidov 86'	Report		Stadium: Al-Ittihad; Referee: (United Arab Emirates) Mohammed Zaruni

21 December 2014 Friendly	Uzbekistan	2–1	Jordan	Dubai, UAE
	Sardor Rashidov 31' (pen.); Navruzbek Olimov 87'	Report	Al-Saify 16'

25 December 2014 Friendly	Uzbekistan	1–0	Iraq	Sharja, UAE
	Jamshid Iskanderov 13' (pen.)	Report		Stadium: Khalid bin Mohammed; Referee: (United Arab Emirates) Mohammed Abdulla

28 December 2014 Friendly	Uzbekistan	0–0	Iraq	Sharja, UAE
		Report		Stadium: Khalid bin Mohammed; Referee: (United Arab Emirates) Mohammed Zaruni

=== 2015 ===
10 January 2015 Asian Cup 2015	Uzbekistan	1–0	North Korea	Sydney, Australia
Group B	Igor Sergeev 62'	Report		Stadium: Stadium Australia; Attendance: 12,078; Referee: (Bahrain) Nawaf Shukralla

14 January 2015 Asian Cup 2015	China	2–1	Uzbekistan	Brisbane, Australia
Group B	Wu Xi 54'; Sun Ke 68'	Report	Odil Ahmedov 23'	Stadium: Brisbane Stadium; Attendance: 13,674; Referee: (United Arab Emirates) Abdulla Hassan Mohamed

18 January 2015 Asian Cup 2015	Uzbekistan	3–1	Saudi Arabia	Melbourne, Australia
Group B	Sardor Rashidov 2', 78'; Vokhid Shodiev 71'	Report	Mohammad Al-Sahlawi 60' (pen.)	Stadium: Melbourne Rectangular Stadium; Attendance: 10,871; Referee: (Australia) Ben Williams

22 January 2015 Asian Cup 2015	South Korea	2–0 (a.e.t.)	Uzbekistan	Melbourne, Australia
Quarterfinal	Son Heung-min 104', 120'	Report		Stadium: Melbourne Rectangular Stadium; Attendance: 23,381; Referee: (Saudi Arabia) Fahad Al-Mirdasi

27 March 2015 Friendly	South Korea	1–1	Uzbekistan	Daejeon, South Korea
	Koo Ja-Cheol 15'	Report	Zokhir Kuziboyev 31'	Stadium: Daejeon World Cup Stadium; Attendance: 38,680; Referee: (Japan) Ryuji Sato

31 March 2015 Friendly	Japan	5–1	Uzbekistan	Tokyo, Japan
	Toshihiro Aoyama 7'; Shinji Okazaki 55'; Gaku Shibasaki 79'; Takashi Usami 83'; Kengo Kawamata 90'	Report	Islom Tukhtakhodjaev 82'	Stadium: Ajinomoto Stadium; Attendance: 46,007; Referee: (Australia) Strebre Delovski

11 June 2015 Friendly	Uzbekistan	0–1	Iran	Tashkent, Uzbekistan
		Report	Mehdi Torabi 90+2'	Stadium: Bunyodkor; Referee: (Uzbekistan) Vladislav Tseytlin

16 June 2015 World Cup 2018 qualification	North Korea	4–2	Uzbekistan	Pyongyang, North Korea
Second Round. Group H	Pak Kwang-ryong 4'; Jang Kuk-chol 16'; Ro Hak-su 34'; Ri Hyok-chol 36'	Report (FIFA); Report (AFC)	Igor Sergeev 53'; Sardor Rashidov 79'	Stadium: Kim Il-sung Stadium; Attendance: 42,000; Referee: (Malaysia) Mohd Amirul Izwan Bin Yaacob

3 September 2015 World Cup 2018 qualification	Uzbekistan	1–0	Yemen	Tashkent, Uzbekistan
Second Round. Group H	Alexander Geynrikh 51'	Report (FIFA); Report (AFC)		Stadium: Pakhtakor; Attendance: 15,000; Referee: (South Korea) Lee Min-hu

8 September 2015 World Cup 2018 qualification	Philippines	1–5	Uzbekistan	Bocaue, Philippine
Second Round. Group H	Stephan Schröck 68'	Report (FIFA); Report (AFC)	Odil Ahmedov 1'; Sardor Rashidov 14', 80'; Igor Sergeev 43', 65'	Stadium: Philippine Sports Stadium; Attendance: 7,500; Referee: (Australia) Peter Green

8 October 2015 World Cup 2018 qualification	Bahrain	0–4	Uzbekistan	Riffa, Bahrain
Second Round. Group H		Report (FIFA); Report (AFC)	Igor Sergeev 52'; Odil Ahmedov 56'; Sardor Rashidov 66'; Eldor Shomurodov 90+5'	Stadium: Bahrain National Stadium; Attendance: 5,000; Referee: (Japan) Minoru Tōjō

12 November 2015 World Cup 2018 qualification	Uzbekistan	3–1	North Korea	Tashkent, Uzbekistan
Second Round. Group H	Igor Sergeev 23'; Alexander Geynrikh 65'; Odil Ahmedov 87'	Report (FIFA); Report (AFC)	Ri Hyok-chol 2'	Stadium: Pakhtakor; Attendance: 27,135; Referee: (Iran) Alireza Faghani

17 November 2015 World Cup 2018 qualification	Yemen	1–3	Uzbekistan	Doha, Qatar
Second Round. Group H	Ahmed Abdulhakim Al-Sarori 90+2'	Report (FIFA); Report (AFC)	Azizbek Haydarov 7'; Server Djeparov 31'; Stanislav Andreev 50'	Stadium: Grand Hamad Stadium; Attendance: 350; Referee: (Oman) Abdullah Al Hilali

=== 2016 ===
14 February 2016 Friendly	Uzbekistan	2–0	Lebanon	Dubai, UAE
	Eldor Shomurodov 5'; Server Djeparov 45' (pen.)	Report

24 March 2016 World Cup 2018 qualification	Uzbekistan	1–0	Philippines	Tashkent, Uzbekistan
18:00 UTC+5	Ismailov 59'	Report (FIFA); Report (AFC)		Stadium: Bunyodkor Stadium; Attendance: 34,000; Referee: Ryuji Sato (Japan)

29 March 2016 World Cup 2018 qualification	Uzbekistan	1–0	Bahrain	Tashkent, Uzbekistan
18:00 UTC+5	Sardor Rashidov 50'	Report (FIFA); Report (AFC)		Stadium: Bunyodkor Stadium

7 June 2016 Friendly	Canada	2–1	Uzbekistan	Bad Waltersdorf, Austria
	Edgar 20'; Komilov 81' (o.g.)	Report	Shomurodov 62'	Stadium: Thermenstadion Bad Waltersdorf

24 July 2016 Friendly	Uzbekistan	2–1	Iraq	Tashkent, Uzbekistan
	Bikmaev 7'; Shomurodov 31'	Report	Bayar Abubakir 90+2'	Stadium: Bunyodkor Stadium

24 August 2016 Friendly	Uzbekistan	1–0	Burkina Faso	Tashkent, Uzbekistan
20:00 UTC+5	Krimets 42'	Report		Stadium: Pakhtakor Stadium

1 September 2016 World Cup 2018 qualification	Uzbekistan	1–0	Syria	Tashkent, Uzbekistan
20:00 UTC+5	Geynrikh 74'	Report (FIFA); Report (AFC)		Stadium: Bunyodkor Stadium; Attendance: 29,100; Referee: Ryuji Sato (Japan)

6 September 2016 World Cup 2018 qualification	Qatar	0–1	Uzbekistan	Doha, Qatar
19:00 UTC+3		Report (FIFA); Report (AFC)	Krimets 86'	Stadium: Jassim Bin Hamad Stadium; Referee: Ali Abdulnabi (Bahrain)

6 October 2016 World Cup 2018 qualification	Uzbekistan	0–1	Iran	Tashkent, Uzbekistan
		Report (FIFA); Report (AFC)	Hosseini 27'	Stadium: Bunyodkor Stadium; Referee: Ben Williams (Australia)

11 October 2016 World Cup 2018 qualification	Uzbekistan	2–0	China	Tashkent, Uzbekistan
	Bikmaev 50'; Shukurov 85'	Report (FIFA); Report (AFC)		Stadium: Bunyodkor Stadium

10 November 2016 Friendly	Uzbekistan	1–0	Jordan	Tashkent, Uzbekistan
	Igor Sergeev 45'			Stadium: Pakhtakor Stadium; Referee: Sherzod Qosimov (Uzbekistan)

15 November 2016 World Cup 2018 qualification	South Korea	2–1	Uzbekistan	Seoul, Korea Republic
	Nam Tae-hee 67'; Koo Ja-cheol 85'	Report (FIFA); Report (AFC)	Bikmaev 25'	Stadium: Seoul World Cup Stadium Seoul; Referee: Fahad Al-Mirdasi (Saudi Arabia)

=== 2017 ===
23 January 2017 Friendly	Uzbekistan	2–2	Georgia	Dubai, United Arab Emirates
17:00 UTC+4	Shomurodov 45', 78'	Report	Shonia 69'; Lobzhanidze 77'	Stadium: The Sevens Stadium; Referee: Hamad Ali (United Arab Emirates)

23 March 2017 World Cup 2018 qualification	Syria	1–0	Uzbekistan	Krubong, Malaysia
20:00 UTC+8	Kharbin 90+1' (pen.)	Report (FIFA); Report (AFC)		Stadium: Hang Jebat Stadium (Note: Syria played their home matches outside Syria due to security concerns from the Syrian Civil War.); Attendance: 350; Referee: Mohammed Abdulla Hassan Mohamed (United Arab Emirates)

28 March 2017 World Cup 2018 qualification	Uzbekistan	1–0	Qatar	Tashkent, Uzbekistan
18:00 UTC+5	Ahmedov 65'	Report (FIFA); Report (AFC)		Stadium: Bunyodkor Stadium; Attendance: 19,000; Referee: Mohanad Qasim Eesee Sarray (Iraq)

6 June 2017 Friendly	Uzbekistan	2–0	Thailand	Tashkent, Uzbekistan
20:00 UTC+5	Abdukholiqov 67'; Rashidov 90+3'	Report (UFF)		Stadium: Bunyodkor Stadium; Attendance: 13,000; Referee: Sherzod Kasimov (Uzbekistan)

12 June 2017 World Cup 2018 qualification	Iran	2–0	Uzbekistan	Tehran, Iran
21:15 UTC+4:30	Azmoun 23'; Taremi 88'	Report (FIFA); Report (AFC)		Stadium: Azadi Stadium; Attendance: 59,730; Referee: Ahmed Al-Kaf (Oman)

31 August 2017 World Cup 2018 qualification	China	1–0	Uzbekistan	Wuhan, China
20:00 UTC+8	Gao Lin 85' (pen.)	Report (FIFA); Report (AFC)		Stadium: Wuhan Sports Center Stadium; Attendance: 51,666; Referee: Hettikamkanamge Perera (Sri Lanka)

5 September 2017 World Cup 2018 qualification	Uzbekistan	0–0	South Korea	Tashkent, Uzbekistan
20:00 UTC+5		Report (FIFA); Report (AFC)		Stadium: Bunyodkor Stadium; Attendance: 34,000; Referee: Muhammad Taqi (Singapore)

14 November 2017 Friendly	United Arab Emirates	1–0	Uzbekistan	Al Ain, United Arab Emirates
18:00 UTC+3	Mabkhout 16'	Report		Stadium: Sheikh Khalifa International Stadium; Referee: Turki Al Khudair (Saudi Arabia)

=== 2018 ===
23 March 2018 Friendly	Senegal	1–1	Uzbekistan	Casablanca, Morocco
18:30 UTC±0	Konaté 63'	Report	Shukurov 20' (pen.)	Stadium: Stade Mohammed V Attendance: 2,200; Referee: Noureddine El Jaafari (Morocco)

27 March 2018 Friendly	Morocco	2–0	Uzbekistan	Casablanca, Morocco
22:00 UTC+1	El Kaabi 4'; da Costa 43'	Report		Stadium: Stade Mohammed V Attendance: 15,000; Referee: Maguette Ndiaye (Senegal)

19 May 2018 Friendly	Iran	1–0	Uzbekistan	Tehran, Iran
21:00 UTC+4:30	Cheshmi 17'	Report		Stadium: Azadi Stadium; Attendance: 21,730; Referee: Saoud Al Athbah (Qatar)

7 June 2018 Friendly	Uruguay	3–0	Uzbekistan	Montevideo, Uruguay
20:10 UTC–3	De Arrascaeta 32'; Suárez 54' (pen.); Giménez 73'	Report		Stadium: Estadio Centenario; Attendance: 50,600; Referee: Raphael Claus (Brazil)

6 September 2018 Friendly	Uzbekistan	1–1	Syria	Tashkent, Uzbekistan
20:00 UTC+5	Bikmaev 64' (pen.)	Report	Al Soma 78'	Stadium: Milliy Stadium; Referee: Çarymyrat Kurbanow (Turkmenistan)

11 September 2018 Friendly	Uzbekistan	0–1	Iran	Tashkent, Uzbekistan
17:30 UTC+5		Report	Torabi 67'	Stadium: Milliy Stadium; Attendance: 19,462; Referee: Dmitry Mashentsev (Kyrgyzstan)

13 October 2018 Friendly	Uzbekistan	2–0	North Korea	Tashkent, Uzbekistan
20:00 UTC+5	Bikmaev 37', 90+1'	Report		Stadium: Milliy Stadium; Referee: Dmitry Mashentsev (Kyrgyzstan)

16 October 2018 Friendly	Uzbekistan	2–0	Qatar	Tashkent, Uzbekistan
20:00 UTC+5	Ahmedov 73'; Bikmaev 86'	Report		Stadium: Milliy Stadium; Attendance: 12,155; Referee: Çarymyrat Kurbanow (Turkmenistan)

15 November 2018 Friendly	Uzbekistan	0–0	Lebanon	Gold Coast, Australia
20:00 UTC+10		Report		Stadium: Robina Stadium; Referee: Shaun Evans (Australia)

20 November 2018 Friendly	Uzbekistan	0–4	South Korea	Brisbane, Australia
20:00 UTC+10		Report	Nam Tae-hee 9'; Hwang Ui-jo 24'; Moon Seon-min 70'; Suk Hyun-jun 82'	Stadium: QSAC; Attendance: 1,652; Referee: Chris Beath (Australia)

=== 2019 ===
9 January 2019 2019 Asian Cup	Uzbekistan	2–1	Oman	Sharjah, United Arab Emirates
17:30 UTC+4	Ahmedov 34'; Shomurodov 85'	Report	Mu. Al-Ghassani 72'	Stadium: Sharjah Stadium; Attendance: 9,424; Referee: Ko Hyung-jin (South Korea)

13 January 2019 2019 Asian Cup	Turkmenistan	0–4	Uzbekistan	Dubai, United Arab Emirates
20:00 UTC+4		Report	Sidikov 17'; Shomurodov 24', 42'; Masharipov 40'	Stadium: Rashid Stadium; Attendance: 4,354; Referee: Ammar Al-Jeneibi (United Arab Emirates)

17 January 2019 2019 Asian Cup	Japan	2–1	Uzbekistan	Al Ain, United Arab Emirates
17:30 UTC+4	Muto 43'; Shiotani 58'	Report	Shomurodov 40'	Stadium: Khalifa bin Zayed Stadium; Attendance: 7,005; Referee: Mohammed Abdulla Hassan Mohamed (United Arab Emirates)

21 January 2019 2019 Asian Cup	Australia	0–0 (a.e.t.) (4–2 p)	Uzbekistan	Al Ain, United Arab Emirates
18:00 UTC+4		Report		Stadium: Khalifa bin Zayed Stadium; Attendance: 6,809; Referee: Abdulrahman Al-Jassim (Qatar)
	Penalties
	Milligan (penalty scored); Behich (penalty missed); Kruse (penalty scored); Giannou (penalty scored); Leckie (penalty scored)		(penalty scored) Shukurov; (penalty missed) Tukhtakhodjaev; (penalty scored) Alibaev; (penalty missed) Bikmaev

22 March 2019 2019 China Cup	Uzbekistan	0–3	Uruguay	Nanning, China
19:35 UTC+8		Report	Pereiro 5'; Stuani 23', 82'	Stadium: Guangxi Sports Center; Attendance: 18,000; Referee: Milorad Mažić (Serbia)

25 March 2019 2019 China Cup	China	0–1	Uzbekistan	Nanning, China
15:30 UTC+8		Report	Shomurodov 34'	Stadium: Guangxi Sports Center; Attendance: 10,391; Referee: Mohammed Al-Shammari (Qatar)

2 June 2019 Friendly	Turkey	2–0	Uzbekistan	Alanya, Turkey
21:00 UTC+3	Çelik 17', 57'	Report		Stadium: Alanya Stadium; Attendance: 9,000; Referee: Srđan Jovanović (Serbia)

7 June 2019 Friendly	Uzbekistan	4–0	North Korea	Tashkent, Uzbekistan
20:00 UTC+5	Ahmedov 29' (pen.); Abdukholiqov 65'; Sergeev 68'; Tursunov 90+2'	Report		Stadium: Milliy Stadium; Attendance: 31,000; Referee: Çarymyrat Kurbanow (Turkmenistan)

11 June 2019 Friendly	Uzbekistan	2–0	Syria	Tashkent, Uzbekistan
18:30 UTC+5	Shomurodov 3', 42'	Report		Stadium: Milliy Stadium; Attendance: 32,000; Referee: Rysbek Shekerbekov (Kyrgyzstan)

5 September 2019 2022 World Cup qualification	Palestine	2–0	Uzbekistan	Al-Ram, Palestine
17:00 UTC+3	Dabbagh 60'; Batran 85'	Report (FIFA); Report (AFC)		Stadium: Faisal Al-Husseini International Stadium; Attendance: 6,740; Referee: Fu Ming (China)

9 September 2019 Friendly	Uzbekistan	0–0	Iraq	Amman, Jordan
19:00 UTC+3		Report		Stadium: King Abdullah II Stadium

10 October 2019 2022 World Cup qualification	Uzbekistan	5–0	Yemen	Tashkent, Uzbekistan
17:00 UTC+5	Kodirkulov 3'; Shomurodov 33'; Iskanderov 53'; Tukhtakhodjaev 73'; Sergeev 90'	Report (FIFA); Report (AFC)		Stadium: Pakhtakor Stadium; Attendance: 28,571; Referee: Hanna Hattab (Syria)

15 October 2019 2022 World Cup qualification	Singapore	1–3	Uzbekistan	Kallang, Singapore
19:45 UTC+8	Ikhsan 45+1'	Report (FIFA); Report (AFC)	Ahmedov 15'; Shomurodov 51', 90+2'	Stadium: National Stadium; Attendance: 12,547; Referee: Shen Yinhao (China)

9 November 2019 Friendly	Uzbekistan	3–1	Kyrgyzstan	Tashkent, Uzbekistan
17:00 UTC+5	Sergeev 11'; Khamdamov 53'; Iskanderov 80'	Report	Musabekov 30'	Stadium: Pakhtakor Stadium; Attendance: 11,000

14 November 2019 2022 World Cup qualification	Uzbekistan	2–3	Saudi Arabia	Tashkent, Uzbekistan
17:00 UTC+5	Shomurodov 16'; Shukurov 56' (pen.)	Report (FIFA); Report (AFC)	Al-Faraj 23' (pen.), 85'; Al-Dawsari 90'	Stadium: Pakhtakor Central Stadium; Attendance: 31,427; Referee: Ryuji Sato (Japan)

19 November 2019 2022 World Cup qualification	Uzbekistan	2–0	Palestine	Tashkent, Uzbekistan
17:00 UTC+5	Shomurodov 18', 58'	Report (FIFA); Report (AFC)		Stadium: Pakhtakor Central Stadium; Attendance: 19,143; Referee: Nawaf Shukralla (Bahrain)

== See also ==
- Uzbekistan national football team
- Uzbekistan national football team results (1992–99)
- Uzbekistan national football team results (2000–09)
- Uzbekistan national football team results (2020–present)
- Uzbekistan national football team results – B Matches
