= Uzbekistan national football team results (unofficial matches) =

The following details the Uzbekistan national football team results in "International "B" Matches" and were not accorded the status of official International A Matches.

== Non-International matches ==
18 Jul 1995 Merdeka Cup 1995	Vasas SC (Hungary)	3–2	Uzbekistan	Kuala Lumpur, Malaysia
Group B	Robert Iovan 12', 64'; Mihai Mracsko 89'		Oybek Usmankhodjaev 34'; Numon Khasanov 59'	Attendance: 12,000

20 Jul 1995 Merdeka Cup 1995	Bulgaria League XI	0–0	Uzbekistan	Kuala Lumpur, Malaysia
Group B				Attendance: 7,500

22 Jun 2001 Merdeka Cup 2001	Thailand U-23	0–1	Uzbekistan	Kuala Lumpur, Malaysia
Group B			Bakhtiyor Hamidullaev 69'	Stadium: Shah Alam

24 Jun 2001 Merdeka Cup 2001	Malaysia U-23	0–2	Uzbekistan	Kuala Lumpur, Malaysia
Group B			Andrey Vlasichev 62'; Bakhodir Seytkamalov 71'	Stadium: Shah Alam

26 Dec 2007 King's Cup 2007	Iraq B	3–1	Uzbekistan	Bangkok, Thailand
	Ahmed Salah Alwan 58'; Khaldoun Ibrahim 65'; Wissam Zaki 78'		Pavel Solomin 68' (pen.)	Stadium: Rajamangala; Attendance: 3,000

4 Sep 2010 Friendly	FC Lokomotiv Moscow (Russia)	2–1	Uzbekistan	Moscow, Russia
	Dmitri Loskov 17' (pen.); Georgi Nurov 70'		Odil Akhmedov 82' (pen.)

4 Dec 2010 Friendly	JS Kairouanaise (Tunisia)	0–1	Uzbekistan	Kairouan, Tunisia
			Olim Navkarov 80'

7 Dec 2010 Friendly	CS Hammam-Lif (Tunisia)	1–1	Uzbekistan	Hammam-Lif, Tunisia
	Mehdi Mergeni 25'		Alexander Geynrikh 35'

9 Dec 2010 Friendly	Poços de Caldas (Brazil)	1–4	Uzbekistan	Tunis, Tunisia
			Shavkat Salomov 49'; Anzur Ismailov 78'; Timur Kapadze 87'; Alexander Geynrikh 90'

11 Dec 2010 Friendly	Stade Tunisien (Tunisia)	1–2	Uzbekistan	Tunis, Tunisia
			Azizbek Haydarov 34', 75'

27 Dec 2010 Friendly	Uzbekistan	1–0	(United Arab Emirates) Al Shabab	Dubai, UAE
	Alexander Geynrikh 45'			Stadium: Al-Maktoum

1 Feb 2013 Friendly	Azerbaijan B	0–0	Uzbekistan	Dubai, UAE
				Stadium: The Sevens

6 Jan 2015 Friendly	Uzbekistan	4–1	(Malaysia) Johor Darul Ta'zim F.C.	Sydney, Australia
	Igor Sergeev; Jamshid Iskanderov; Sardor Rashidov; Sanjar Tursunov

17 Jul 2016 Friendly	Uzbekistan	1–1	(Germany) Borussia Dortmund	Austria
	Eldor Shomurodov 66'

20 Jul 2016 Friendly	Uzbekistan	2–2	(Russia) FC Ufa	Austria
	Eldor Shomurodov 2' Jamshid Iskanderov 59' (pen.)

22 January 2017 Friendly	Uzbekistan	1–2	Denmark U23	UAE
	Jamshid Iskanderov		Mikkel Duelund

25 August 2017 Friendly	Uzbekistan	5–0	Kyrgyzstan	Tashkent, Uzbekistan
18:00 UZT (UTC+5)				Stadium: Bunyodkor Stadium

26 March 2021 Unofficial Friendly	Uzbekistan	2–1	Ghana	Namangan, Uzbekistan
18:00 UTC+5	Shukurov 4'; Masharipov 76'	Report	Abdul Fatawu 73'	Stadium: Markaziy Stadium; Referee: Dayirbek Abdildaev (Kyrgyzstan)

26 May 2021 Friendly	Uzbekistan	2–1	Turkmenistan	Tashkent, Uzbekistan
				Stadium: Bunyodkor Stadium

30 May 2021 Unofficial Friendly	Thailand	1–4	Uzbekistan	Dubai, United Arab Emirates
--:-- UTC+4	Adisak 60'		Aliqulov 63'; Ahmedov 70'; Abdukholiqov 73', 90'	Stadium: The Sevens Stadium

13 October 2023 Friendly	Vietnam	0–2	Uzbekistan	Dalian, China
20:35 UTC+8		Report	Urunov 27'; Aliqulov 66'	Stadium: Dalian Sports Centre Stadium; Referee: Zhang Lei (China)
Note: Both sides fielded more than six substitutes

25 December 2023 Friendly	Kyrgyzstan	1–4	Uzbekistan	Dubai, United Arab Emirates
19:30 UTC+4	Duyshobekov 89'	Report	Fayzullaev 23'; Amonov 53'; Masharipov 55'; Gaybullaev 80'	Stadium: Al Maktoum Stadium
Note: Kyrgyzstan fielded more than six substitutions

7 January 2024 Friendly	Palestine	0–1	Uzbekistan	Doha, Qatar
17:00 UTC+3		Report	Abdikholikov 79'	Stadium: Hamad bin Khalifa Stadium

== See also ==
- Uzbekistan national football team
- Uzbekistan national football team results – 1990s
- Uzbekistan national football team results – 2000s
- Uzbekistan national football team results – 2010s
