= Uladzimir Shuneyka =

Belarusian footballer (born 1974)

Personal information
- Date of birth: 22 April 1974 (age 52)
- Place of birth: Minsk, Soviet Union
- Height: 1.85 m (6 ft 1 in)
- Position: Centre-back

Team information
- Current team: Dnepr Mogilev (assistant coach)

Youth career
- SDYuShOR-5 Minsk

Senior career*
| Years | Team | Apps | (Gls) |
| 1992–1994 | Stroitel Starye Dorogi | 47 | (1) |
| 1994–1999 | Dnepr-Transmash Mogilev | 125 | (1) |
| 2000–2004 | Krylia Sovetov Samara | 80 | (0) |
| 2003 | → Levski Sofia (loan) | 2 | (0) |
| 2003 | → Alania Vladikavkaz (loan) | 5 | (0) |
| 2004 | Oryol | 2 | (0) |
| 2006–2012 | Dnepr Mogilev | 156 | (5) |

International career
| 1992 | Belarus U21 | 1 | (0) |
| 2000–2003 | Belarus | 23 | (1) |

Managerial career
- 2013–: Dnepr Mogilev (assistant)
- * Club domestic league appearances and goals

Uladzimir Shuneyka (Belarusian: Уладзімір Шунейка; Russian: Владимир Шунейко; born 22 April 1974) is a Belarusian former professional footballer who is assistant coach at Dnepr Mogilev.

He played in the first ever Belarusian Premier League season in 1992.

He left for Russian side Krylia Sovetov Samara in 2000. In March 2003, he left for Bulgarian side Levski Sofia, becoming the first (and so far only) Belarusian to play in the A PFG.

== Career statistics ==
| # | Date | Venue | Opponent | Score | Result | Competition |
|---|---|---|---|---|---|---|
| 1 | 30 April 2003 | Pakhtakor Markaziy Stadium, Tashkent, Uzbekistan | Uzbekistan | 1 – 0 | 2–1 | Friendly |

== Honours ==
Dnepr-Transmash Mogilev

- Belarusian Premier League: 1998
