= Navruzbek Olimov =

Uzbekistani footballer

Personal information
- Date of birth: 21 March 1992 (age 34)
- Place of birth: Uzbekistan
- Position: Forward

Team information
- Current team: Pakhtakor
- Number: 16

Senior career*
Years	Team	Apps	(Gls)
2013–2014	Qizilqum Zarafshon	32	(4)
2015	Pakhtakor	5	(0)
2015–	Qizilqum Zarafshon	3	(1)

International career^{‡}
2014–	Uzbekistan	7	(2)
- * Club domestic league appearances and goals as of 18 May 2018 ‡ National team caps and goals as of 18 May 2018

Navruzbek Olimov (born 21 March 1992) is an Uzbekistani footballer who currently plays for Pakhtakor as a striker.

== Career ==
In 2015, he moved to Pakhtakor after completing two season playing for Qizilqum Zarafshon.

== International career ==
Olimov played his debut match for senior national team on 27 May 2014 against Oman (0–1), where he came in as a substitute for Ivan Nagaev in the 67th minute.

== Career statistics ==
=== International goal ===
Scores and results list Uzbekistan's goal tally first.

#	Date	Venue	Opponent	Score	Result	Competition
1.	14 October 2014	Dubai Club Stadium, Dubai, United Arab Emirates	United Arab Emirates	4–0	4–0	Friendly
2.	21 December 2014	Dubai Club Stadium, Dubai, United Arab Emirates	Jordan	2–1	2–1	Friendly
