= Fevzi Davletov =

Uzbekistani football defender

Personal information
- Full name: Fevzi Rizayevich Davletov
- Date of birth: 20 September 1972 (age 54)
- Place of birth: Uzbek SSR, Soviet Union
- Height: 1.78 m (5 ft 10 in)
- Position: Defender

Senior career*
Years	Team	Apps	(Gls)
1990–1993	Navbahor Namangan	61	(2)
1993–1997	MHSK Tashkent	129	(22)
1998	Rubin Kazan	11	(0)
1998	Avtomobilist Noginsk	9	(0)
1999	Do'stlik	16	(2)
1999–2000	Belasitsa Petrich	12	(0)
2000–2001	Do'stlik	33	(8)
2002–2004	Irtysh Pavlodar	87	(2)
2005	Zhetysu	24	(0)
2006–2007	Qizilqum Zarafshon	24	(4)
2007–2008	Megasport	36	(1)
2009	Andijon	21	(0)

International career^{‡}
1994–2005	Uzbekistan	48	(3)
Medal record
Men's football
Representing Uzbekistan
Asian Games
Gold medal – first place	1994 Hiroshima
- * Club domestic league appearances and goals as of 1 September 2020 ‡ National team caps and goals as of 1 September 2020

Fevzi Rizayevich Davletov (born 20 September 1972) is a retired Uzbekistan International football defender.

== Career statistics ==
=== International ===
As of match played 17 August 2005

Appearances and goals by national team and year
National team	Year	Apps	Goals
Uzbekistan	1994	9	0
Uzbekistan	1995	0	0
Uzbekistan	1996	5	0
Uzbekistan	1997	6	0
Uzbekistan	1998	0	0
Uzbekistan	1999	5	2
Uzbekistan	2000	3	0
Uzbekistan	2001	19	1
Uzbekistan	2002	0	0
Uzbekistan	2003	0	0
Uzbekistan	2004	0	0
Uzbekistan	2005	1	0
Total		48	3

As of goal scored on 13 October 2001
Scores and results list Uzbekistan's goal tally first, score column indicates score after each Davletov goal.

List of international goals scored by Fevzi Davletov
No.	Date	Venue	Opponent	Score	Result	Competition
1	21 November 1999	Tahnoun bin Mohammed Stadium, Al Ain, United Arab Emirates	Bangladesh	3–0	6–0	2000 AFC Asian Cup qualification
2	23 November 1999	Tahnoun bin Mohammed Stadium, Al Ain, United Arab Emirates	Sri Lanka	3–0	6–0	2000 AFC Asian Cup qualification
3	13 October 2001	Sultan Qaboos Sports Complex, Muscat, Oman	Oman	1–0	2–4	2002 FIFA World Cup qualification

== Honours ==
Uzbekistan

- Asian Games: Gold Medalist, 1994
