= Nikolay Shirshov =

Uzbekistani footballer (1974–2021)

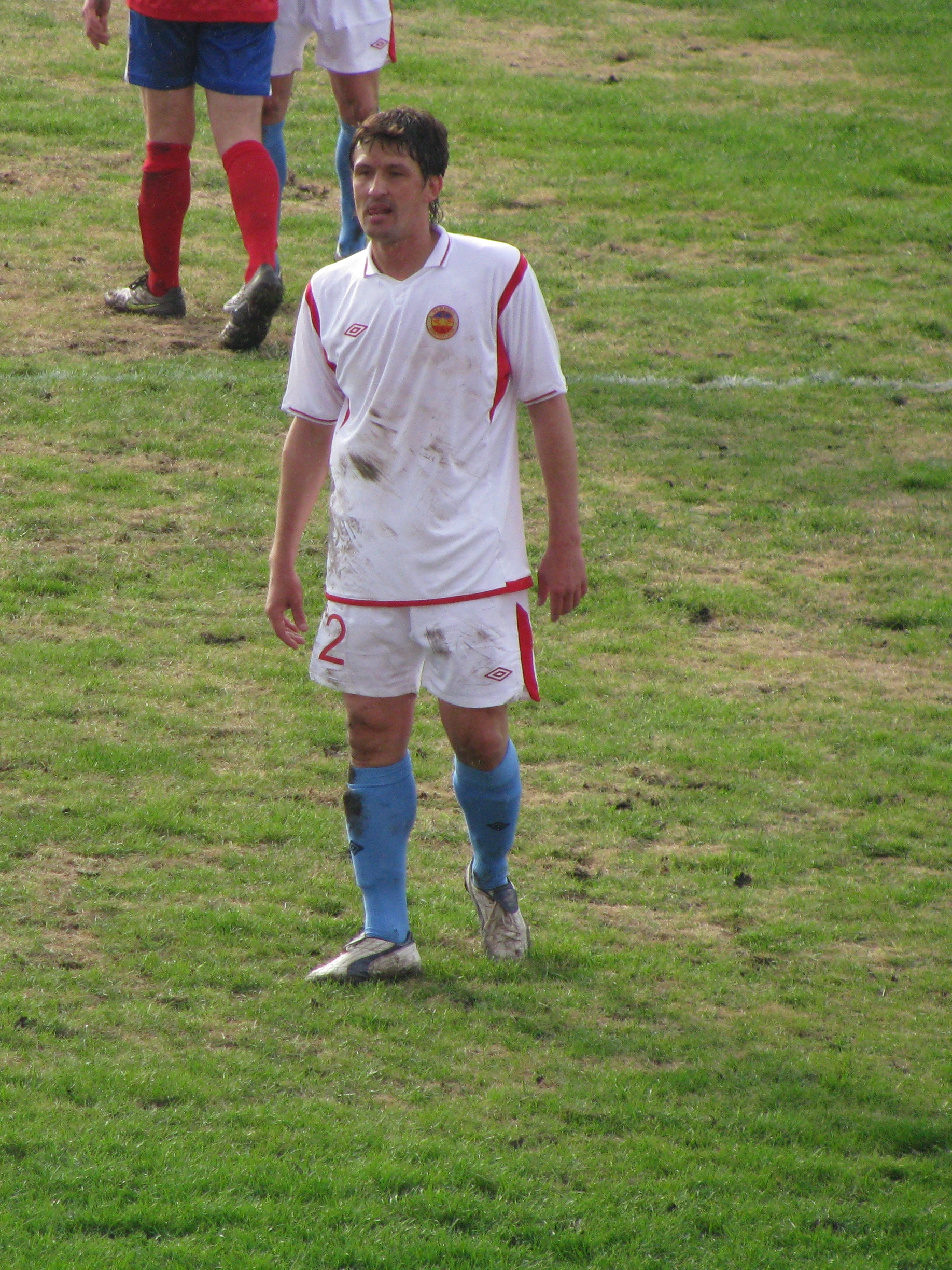

Personal information
- Date of birth: 22 June 1974
- Place of birth: Tashkent, Uzbek SSR, Soviet Union
- Date of death: 28 December 2021 (aged 47)
- Place of death: Rostov-on-Don, Russia
- Height: 1.79 m (5 ft 10 in)
- Position: Defender

Senior career*
Years	Team	Apps	(Gls)
1992	Traktor Tashkent	16	(0)
1992–1994	Pakhtakor Tashkent	62	(6)
1994	Ordabasy	1	(0)
1995–1999	Pakhtakor Tashkent	97	(10)
2000–2005	Rostov	120	(1)
2006–2007	SKA Rostov-on-Don	54	(8)
2008–2010	Bataysk-2007	76	(6)
2010	Taganrog	14	(1)
2011	MITOS Novocherkassk	25	(1)
2012–2013	TPF	21	(7)

International career
1996–2005	Uzbekistan	64	(13)
- * Club domestic league appearances and goals

Nikolay Shirshov (22 June 1974 – 28 December 2021) was an Uzbekistani professional footballer who played as a midfielder.

== Career ==
Shirshov began his player career in 1991, in Sverdlovets, club from Soviet Second League. From 1992 to 1999 he played in Uzbek League clubs Traktor Tashkent and Pakhtakor. Since 2000, he played in Russian football clubs.

He got 63 caps and 13 goals for the Uzbekistan national team between 1996 and 2005.

== International goals ==
No.	Date	Venue	Opponent	Score	Result	Competition
1.	25 May 1997	Pakhtakor Markaziy Stadium, Tashkent, Uzbekistan	Cambodia	1–0	6–0	1998 FIFA World Cup qualification
2.	27 September 1997	Pakhtakor Markaziy Stadium, Tashkent, Uzbekistan	United Arab Emirates	1–0	2–3	1998 FIFA World Cup qualification
3.	7 December 1998	Supachalasai Stadium, Bangkok, Thailand	North Korea	1–0	4–0	1998 Asian Games
4.	7 December 1998	Supachalasai Stadium, Bangkok, Thailand	North Korea	4–0	4–0	1998 Asian Games
5.	11 July 1999	Dinamo Samarkand Stadium, Samarkand, Uzbekistan	Malaysia	1–0	3–0	Friendly
6.	23 November 1999	Tahnoun bin Mohammed Stadium, Abu Dhabi, UAE	Sri Lanka	4–0	6–0	2000 AFC Asian Cup qualification
7.	23 November 1999	Tahnoun bin Mohammed Stadium, Abu Dhabi, UAE	Sri Lanka	5–0	6–0	2000 AFC Asian Cup qualification
8.	25 November 1999	Tahnoun bin Mohammed Stadium, Abu Dhabi, UAE	India	3–2	3–2	2000 AFC Asian Cup qualification
9.	27 April 2001	Pakhtakor Markaziy Stadium, Tashkent, Uzbekistan	Jordan	2–2	2–2	2002 FIFA World Cup qualification
10.	17 August 2001	Zayed Sports City Stadium, Abu Dhabi, UAE	United Arab Emirates	1–2	1–4	2002 FIFA World Cup qualification
11.	28 September 2001	Khalifa International Stadium, Doha, Qatar	Qatar	2–1	2–2	2002 FIFA World Cup qualification
12.	19 October 2001	Pakhtakor Markaziy Stadium, Tashkent, Uzbekistan	China	1–0	1–0	2002 FIFA World Cup qualification
13.	19 November 2003	Rajamangala Stadium, Bangkok, Thailand	Hong Kong	1–0	1–0	2004 AFC Asian Cup qualification

== Personal life and death ==
Shirshov died on 28 December 2021, at the age of 47. The cause of death was not specified.
