= Andrey Akopyants =

Uzbekistani football midfielder (born 1977)

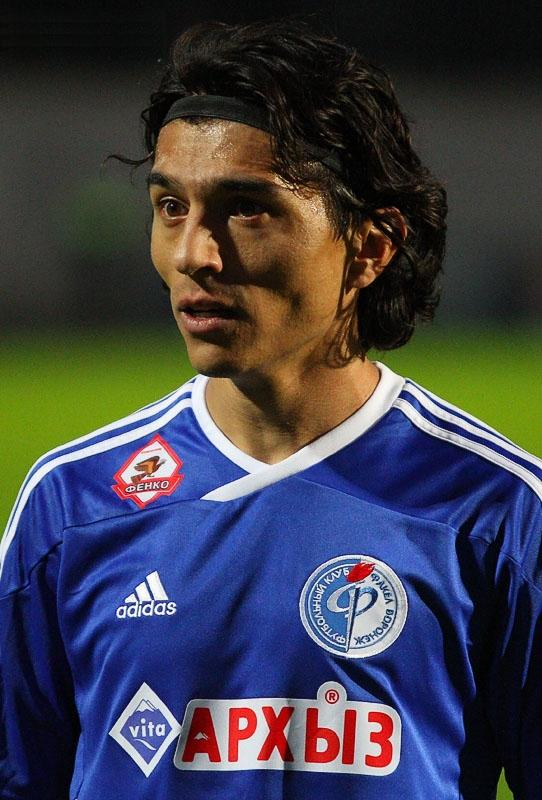
- With Fakel in 2011

Personal information
- Full name: Andrey Akopyants
- Date of birth: 27 August 1977 (age 49)
- Place of birth: Tashkent, Soviet Union
- Height: 1.69 m (5 ft 6 1/2 in)
- Positions: Midfielder; forward

Senior career*
Years	Team	Apps	(Gls)
1996–1999	Pakhtakor Tashkent	109	(25)
2000–2005	Rostov	116	(5)
2006	Chernomorets Novorossiysk	30	(15)
2007	Darida Minsk Raion	13	(2)
2007–2008	Daugava Daugavpils	21	(2)
2008	Pakhtakor Tashkent	15	(0)
2009	Dinamo Samarqand	24	(3)
2010	Nizhny Novgorod	37	(4)
2011	Luch-Energiya Vladivostok	15	(2)
2011–2012	Fakel Voronezh	26	(1)
2012–2013	Khimik Dzerzhinsk	23	(0)
2014	FK Buxoro	9	(1)
2014	Neftchi Farg'ona	6	(0)

International career^{‡}
1997	Uzbekistan U-19	6	(3)
1998–2005	Uzbekistan	40	(6)
- * Club domestic league appearances and goals ‡ National team caps and goals as of 22 March 2015

Andrey Akopyants (born 27 August 1977) is an Uzbekistani former football midfielder of Armenian descent. He last played for Neftchi Farg'ona.

== Career ==
He started his playing career at Pakhtakor in 1996. He played for Pakhtakor in 1996–1999. In 2000, he moved to FC Rostov and completed for club 6 seasons.

== International ==
Akopyants played 40 matches and scored 6 goals for the Uzbekistan national team between 1998 and 2005.

== Career statistics ==
=== International goals ===
#	Date	Venue	Opponent	Score	Result	Competition
1.	3 December 1998	700th Anniversary Stadium, Chiang Mai, Thailand	Kuwait	3–3	Win	1998 Asian Games
2.	5 December 1998	700th Anniversary Stadium, Chiang Mai, Thailand	Mongolia	0–15	Win	1998 Asian Games
3.	7 December 1998	Rajamangala Stadium, Bangkok, Thailand	North Korea	4–0	Win	1998 Asian Games
4.	3 May 2001	Amman International Stadium, Amman, Jordan	Turkmenistan	2–5	Win	2002 World Cup qualifying
5.	20 August 2003	Skonto Stadium, Riga, Latvia	Latvia	0–3	Win	Friendly
6.	6 November 2003	Pakhtakor Markaziy Stadium, Tashkent, Uzbekistan	Hong Kong	4–1	Win	2004 Asian Cup qualifying
Correct as of 7 October 2015

== Honours ==
=== Club ===
Pakhtakor

- Uzbek League (1): 1998
- Uzbek League runners-up (1): 2008
- Uzbek Cup (1) 1997
- Uzbek Cup runners-up (1): 2008

Khimik

- RFPL West conference (1) 2012–13

=== Individual ===
- Uzbekistan Footballer of the Year: 1999
