= 2024 FC Tobol season =

FC Tobol
2024 season
- Chairman: Nikolay Panin
- Manager: Milic Curcic (until 10 June); Nurbol Zhumaskaliyev (Acting) (from 10 June)
- Stadium: Central Stadium
- Premier League: 5th
- Kazakhstan Cup: Semi-final vs Atyrau
- League Cup: Group stage
- UEFA Europa League: First qualifying round
- UEFA Conference League: Second qualifying round
- Top goalscorer: League: Islam Chesnokov (10); All: Islam Chesnokov (11)
- Highest home attendance: 6,830 vs Ružomberok (18 July 2024)
- Lowest home attendance: 1,500 vs Zhetysu (4 May 2024)
- Average home league attendance: 3,281 (3 November 2024)
Home colours	Away colours	Third colours

The 2024 FC Tobol season was the 26th successive season that the club played in the Kazakhstan Premier League, the highest tier of association football in Kazakhstan.

== Season events ==
On 10 January, Tobol announced the departure of Ivan Konovalov, Bojan Mlađović, Pavel Zabelin and Pavel Kireyenko.

On 10 June, Tobol announced that Head Coach Milić Ćurčić had left the club by mutual agreement, and Nurbol Zhumaskaliyev had been appointed as Acting Head Coach.

On 25 June, Tobol announced the departure of David Domgjoni.

On 26 June, Tobol announced the signing of Rui Costa from Farense, with Pedro Eugénio joining from Atyrau the following day.

On 3 July, Tobol announced the departure of Godberg Cooper.

On 9 July, Tobol announced the signing of Tsotne Mosiashvili from Zhetysu.

On 24 July, Tobol announced the signing of Aleksandr Zuyev from Arsenal Tula.

== Squad ==
As of match played 10 November 2024

No.	Name	Nationality	Position	Date of birth (age)	Signed from	Signed in	Contract ends	Apps.	Goals
Goalkeepers
1	Stas Pokatilov	(Kazakhstan)	GK	8 December 1992 (aged 31)	Aktobe	2024		33	0
12	Sultan Busurmanov	(Kazakhstan)	GK	10 May 1996 (aged 28)	Academy	2015		34	0
21	David Mukhin	(Kazakhstan)	GK	17 October 2006 (aged 18)	Academy	2024		1	0
35	Yuri Melikhov	(Kazakhstan)	GK	1 September 2003 (aged 21)	Academy	2021		0	0
Defenders
3	Roman Asrankulov	(Kazakhstan)	DF	30 July 1999 (aged 25)	Academy	2018		90	4
4	Ermek Abdulla	(Kazakhstan)	DF	21 January 2003 (aged 21)	Taraz	2024		1	0
5	Pape-Alioune Ndiaye	(France)	DF	4 February 1998 (aged 26)	Şanlıurfaspor	2024		32	1
15	Albert Gabarayev	(Russia)	DF	28 September 1997 (aged 27)	Rodina Moscow	2023		67	0
25	Roman Bozhko	(Kazakhstan)	DF	13 August 2002 (aged 22)	Akzhayik	2024		4	0
33	Asan Bitekenov	(Kazakhstan)	DF	7 October 2003 (aged 21)	Academy	2022		2	0
37	Valery Usinevich	(Kazakhstan)	DF	15 July 2005 (aged 19)	Academy	2024		2	0
38	Amanzhol Bakitzhanov	(Kazakhstan)	DF	24 December 2007 (aged 16)	Academy	2024		6	0
42	Evgeniy Kochetkov	(Kazakhstan)	DF	29 January 2004 (aged 20)	Academy	2022		2	0
49	Maksim Kononenko	(Kazakhstan)	DF	9 October 2004 (aged 20)	Academy	2023		2	0
53	Bekzat Minaydarov	(Kazakhstan)	DF	21 January 2003 (aged 21)	Academy	2024		2	1
55	Ivan Miladinović	(Serbia)	DF	14 August 1994 (aged 30)	Unattached	2024		28	1
	Timur Zhakupov	(Kazakhstan)	DF	6 September 1995 (aged 29)	Zhetysu	2023		11	0
Midfielders
6	Ededem Essien	(Nigeria)	MF	14 April 1998 (aged 26)	Pari Nizhny Novgorod	2024		31	0
8	Ahmed El Messaoudi	(Morocco)	MF	3 August 1995 (aged 29)	Emmen	2024		33	8
10	Igor Ivanović	(Serbia)	MF	28 July 1997 (aged 27)	Astana	2024		45	9
11	Islam Chesnokov	(Kazakhstan)	MF	21 November 1999 (aged 24)	Belshina Bobruisk	2023		63	19
13	Tsotne Mosiashvili	(Georgia (country))	MF	14 February 1995 (aged 29)	Zhetysu	2024		16	0
16	Yerkin Tapalov	(Kazakhstan)	MF	3 September 1993 (aged 31)	Kyzylzhar	2024		27	2
18	Aleksandr Zuyev	(Kazakhstan)	MF	26 June 1996 (aged 28)	Arsenal Tula	2024		13	1
19	Ruslan Valiullin	(Kazakhstan)	MF	9 September 1994 (aged 30)	Unattached	2023		96	5
21	Radoslav Tsonev	(Bulgaria)	MF	29 April 1995 (aged 29)	Arda Kardzhali	2024		22	2
22	Nurbek Bayzhanov	(Kazakhstan)	MF	4 April 2003 (aged 21)	Academy	2024		1	0
23	Nurgaini Buribaev	(Kazakhstan)	MF	20 August 2002 (aged 22)	Turan	2024		2	0
30	Ali Abdibek	(Kazakhstan)	MF	23 June 2003 (aged 21)	Academy	2021		3	0
34	Sultan Bakhytkiriev	(Kazakhstan)	MF		Academy	2024		1	0
36	Shakhmurza Adyrbekov	(Kazakhstan)	MF	5 July 2006 (aged 18)	Academy	2024		3	0
40	Timur Igubaev	(Kazakhstan)	MF	27 September 2003 (aged 21)	Academy	2024		3	0
44	Nurislam Nurgeldinov	(Kazakhstan)	MF	26 July 2005 (aged 19)	Academy	2024		2	0
47	Saduakas Saduakas	(Kazakhstan)	MF	11 October 2006 (aged 18)	Academy	2024		1	0
50	Alibek Zhaylaubaev	(Kazakhstan)	MF	25 March 2006 (aged 18)	Academy	2021		3	0
51	Beybit Galym	(Kazakhstan)	MF	25 October 2004 (aged 20)	Academy	2022		35	1
52	Vladislav Shchurko	(Kazakhstan)	MF	10 April 2006 (aged 18)	Academy	2024		1	0
57	Azamat Zinadin	(Kazakhstan)	MF	9 October 2006 (aged 18)	Unattached	2024		2	0
99	Pedro Eugénio	(Portugal)	MF	26 June 1990 (aged 34)	Atyrau	2024		6	0
Forwards
7	Zhaslan Zhumashev	(Kazakhstan)	FW	27 September 2001 (aged 23)	Academy	2020		79	5
20	Rui Costa	(Portugal)	FW	20 February 1996 (aged 28)	Farense	2024		16	4
26	Nurbol Zhumadelov	(Kazakhstan)	FW	14 February 2006 (aged 18)	Academy	2024		4	1
43	Dias Nurkanov	(Kazakhstan)	FW	14 November 2003 (aged 20)	Academy	2024		3	0
77	David Henen	(Togo)	FW	19 April 1996 (aged 28)	K.V. Kortrijk	2024		25	4
Players away on loan
Left during the season
28	Yevhen Shakhov	(Ukraine)	MF	30 November 1990 (aged 33)	Zorya Luhansk	2023		29	2
66	David Domgjoni	(Kosovo)	DF	21 May 1997 (aged 27)	Manisa	2024		7	0
90	Godberg Cooper	(Italy)	FW	20 August 1997 (aged 27)	UTA Arad	2024		16	2

== Transfers ==
=== In ===
Date	Position	Nationality	Name	From	Fee	Ref.
22 December 2023	GK	(Kazakhstan)	Stas Pokatilov	Aktobe	Undisclosed	
25 December 2023	MF	(Kazakhstan)	Nurgaini Buribaev	Turan	Undisclosed	
1 January 2024	DF	(Russia)	Albert Gabarayev	Rodina Moscow	Undisclosed	
1 January 2024	MF	(Serbia)	Igor Ivanović	Astana	Undisclosed	
4 January 2024	DF	(Kazakhstan)	Yerkin Tapalov	Kyzylzhar	Undisclosed	
8 January 2024	MF	(Morocco)	Ahmed El Messaoudi	Emmen	Undisclosed	
9 January 2024	MF	(Nigeria)	Ededem Essien	Pari Nizhny Novgorod	Undisclosed	
10 January 2024	MF	(Bulgaria)	Radoslav Tsonev	Arda Kardzhali	Undisclosed	
1 February 2024	DF	(Serbia)	Ivan Miladinović	Unattached	Free	
3 February 2024	DF	(France)	Pape-Alioune Ndiaye	Şanlıurfaspor	Undisclosed	
7 February 2024	FW	(Togo)	David Henen	KV Kortrijk	Undisclosed	
23 February 2024	DF	(Kosovo)	David Domgjoni	Manisa	Undisclosed	
23 February 2024	FW	(Italy)	Godberg Cooper	UTA Arad	Undisclosed	
2 March 2024	DF	(Kazakhstan)	Ermek Abdulla	Taraz	Undisclosed	
2 April 2024	DF	(Kazakhstan)	Roman Bozhko	Akzhayik	Undisclosed	
26 June 2024	MF	(Portugal)	Rui Costa	Farense	Undisclosed	
27 June 2024	FW	(Portugal)	Pedro Eugénio	Atyrau	Undisclosed	
9 July 2024	MF	(Georgia (country))	Tsotne Mosiashvili	Zhetysu	Undisclosed	
24 July 2024	MF	(Kazakhstan)	Aleksandr Zuyev	Arsenal Tula	Undisclosed	

=== Released ===
Date	Position	Nationality	Name	Joined	Date	Ref.
10 January 2024	GK	(Russia)	Ivan Konovalov	Baltika Kaliningrad	30 January 2024	
10 January 2024	DF	(Serbia)	Bojan Mlađović	Dinamo Batumi		
10 January 2024	MF	(Belarus)	Pavel Zabelin	Sokol Saratov	7 February 2024	
10 January 2024	MF	(Russia)	Pavel Kireyenko	Turan		
18 February 2024	MF	(Kazakhstan)	Serikzhan Muzhikov	Zhetysu		
25 June 2024	DF	(Kosovo)	David Domgjoni	Partizani Tirana	29 September 2024	
3 July 2024	FW	(Italy)	Godberg Cooper	Al Hamriyah	3 August 2024	
31 July 2024	MF	(Ukraine)	Yevhen Shakhov			
31 December 2025	MF	(Portugal)	Pedro Eugénio			

== Friendlies ==
2024	–
(UTC+6)

== Competitions ==
Competition	First match	Last match	Starting round	Final position	Record							
Competition	First match	Last match	Starting round	Final position	Pld	W	D	L	GF	GA	GD	Win %
Premier League	2 March 2024	10 November 2024	Matchday 1	5th	24	11	6	7	33	22	+11	45.83
Kazakhstan Cup	13 April 2024	19 June 2024	Round of 16	Semifinal	4	3	0	1	5	4	+1	75.00
League Cup	25 May 2024	21 July 2024	Group stage	Group stage	3	1	0	2	3	7	−4	33.33
Super Cup	25 February 2024	25 February 2024	Final	Winners	1	0	1	0	1	1	+0	0.00
UEFA Europa League	11 July 2024	18 July 2024	First Qualifying Round	First Qualifying Round	2	1	0	1	3	5	−2	50.00
UEFA Conference League	25 July 2024	1 August 2024	Second Qualifying Round	Second Qualifying Round	2	0	0	2	1	5	−4	0.00
Total					36	16	7	13	46	44	+2	44.44

Last updated: 10 November 2024
Source: Competitions

=== Super Cup ===
25 February 2024	Ordabasy	1–1 (4 – 5 p)	Tobol	Aksu
18:00 (UTC+6)	Malyi (yellow card) 15'; Makarenko 45'; Makarenko (yellow card) 88'; Sadovsky (yellow card) 89'	Report	Gabarayev (yellow card) 57'; Miladinović 63'	Stadium: Mardan Sports Complex; Attendance: 6,000; Referee: Bulat Sariev
	Penalties
	Makarenko (penalty scored); Fedin (penalty scored); Reginaldo (penalty missed); Sadovsky (penalty scored); Tursynbay (penalty scored); Tungyshbayev (penalty missed)		(penalty scored) El Messaoudi; (penalty missed) Ivanović; (penalty scored) Asrankulov; (penalty scored) Ndiaye; (penalty scored) Chesnokov; (penalty scored) Cooper

=== Premier League ===
==== Results summary ====
Overall								Home						Away					
Pld	W	D	L	GF	GA	GD	Pts	W	D	L	GF	GA	GD	W	D	L	GF	GA	GD
24	11	6	7	33	22	+11	39	8	2	2	18	8	+10	3	4	5	15	14	+1

Last updated: 10 November 2024.
Source: See Results

==== Results by round ====
Round	1	2	3	4^{1}	5	6	7	8	9	10	11	12	13	14	17	18	19	20	21	16	22	23	15	24^{1}	25	26
Ground	H	H	A	H	A	H	H	A	A	H	A	A	A	A	A	A	H	A	H	H	A	H	A	A	H	A
Result	W	W	D	P	D	D	W	L	L	L	W	D	W	L	W	D	D	L	W	W	L	W	W	P	W	L
Position	3	1	1	5	4	9	1	6	6	7	6	6	4	7	5	5	6	6	6	6	6	6	6	6	4	5

Source: See Results
A = Away; H = Home; W = Win; D = Draw; L = Loss; P = Bye
Notes:
- ^{1} Tobol had a bye during the fourth and twenty-fourth round of fixtures.

==== Results ====
2 March 2024 1	Tobol	2–0	Turan	Kostanay
19:00 (UTC+5)	Ndiaye (yellow card) 36'; El Messaoudi 40' (pen.); Henen 62' Asrankulov (yellow card) 68'; Cooper (yellow card) 90+4'	Report	Zakirov (yellow card) 38'; Choug (yellow card) 44'	Stadium: Central Stadium; Attendance: 2,800; Referee: Rustam Omarov

6 March 2024 2	Tobol	4–2	Elimai	Kostanay
19:30 (UTC+5)	Henen (yellow card) 22'; Ivanović 26' (yellow card) 51'; Shakhov 30'; Gabarayev (yellow card) 51'; Tapalov (yellow card) 68' (goal) 90+1'; Cooper 72'	Report	Tambe 2'; China (yellow card) 22' (goal) 53' (pen.); Shomko (yellow card) 51'; Šaravanja (red card) 62'	Stadium: Central Stadium; Attendance: 2,600; Referee: Bulat Sariev

31 March 2024 3	Kyzylzhar	0–0	Tobol	Petropavl
14:00 (UTC+5)	Nižić (yellow card) 36'; Zhaksybaev (yellow card) 65'; Imnadze (yellow card) 67'; Beryozkin (yellow card) 69'	Report	Ivanović (yellow card) 10'; Tsonev (yellow card) 13'; Tapalov (yellow card) 70'	Stadium: Karasai Stadium; Attendance: 3,000; Referee: Anton Kuchma

4	Tobol	Bye	Aksu	Kostanay
(UTC+5)				Stadium: Central Stadium

21 April 2024 5	Astana	2–2	Tobol	Almaty
16:30 (UTC+5)	Marochkin (yellow card) 10'; Tomasov 27'; Karimov (yellow card) 70'; Vorogovsky (yellow card) 89'; Basmanov 90+3'; Dosmagambetov (yellow card) 90+5'	Report	Ndiaye 13' (yellow card) 39'; Zhumashev (yellow card) 68'; Miladinović (yellow card) 71'; Henen 78' (yellow card) 90+4'; Ivanović (yellow card) 84'	Stadium: Khan Taniri Stadium; Attendance: 1,700; Referee: Denis Izmailov

27 April 2024 6	Tobol	1–1	Zhenis	Kostanay
14:00 (UTC+5)	Ivanović 17'; Ndiaye (yellow card) 45'; Gabarayev (yellow card) 68'	Report	Manaj 76'; Bidzinashvili (yellow card) 90+3'; Belančić (yellow card) 90+6'	Stadium: Central Stadium; Attendance: 2,500; Referee: Baghdad Abdullayev

4 May 2024 7	Tobol	1–0	Zhetysu	Kostanay
16:30 (UTC+5)	Cooper 7'; Tapalov (yellow card) 41'; Essien (yellow card) 53'; El Messaoudi (yellow card) 67'; Henen (yellow card) 73'; Abdulla (red card) 87'	Report	Muzhikov (yellow card) 60'; Baltabekov (yellow card) 62'; Chaduneli (yellow card) 73'	Stadium: Central Stadium; Attendance: 1,500; Referee: Aydin Tasybaev

12 May 2024 8	Ordabasy	1–0	Tobol	Shymkent
21:00 (UTC+5)	Islamkhan (yellow card) 8'; Byesyedin 19' (yellow card) 50'; Plastun (yellow card) 52'; Tagybergen (yellow card) 74'	Report	Essien (yellow card) 8'; Ndiaye (yellow card) 9'; Miladinović (yellow card) 64' (red card) 90+3'; Asrankulov (yellow card) 90+4'	Stadium: Kazhymukan Munaitpasov Stadium; Attendance: 9,573; Referee: Alexander Zatula

19 May 2024 9	Shakhter Karagandy	1–0	Tobol	Karaganda
17:00 (UTC+5)	Tolordava (yellow card) 32'; Cañas 37'	Report	Domgjoni (yellow card) 26'; Cooper (yellow card) 32'	Stadium: Shakhter Stadium; Attendance: 3,000; Referee: Grigory Moskovchenko

1 June 2024 10	Tobol	1–2	Kaisar	Kostanay
19:00 (UTC+5)	Shakhov (yellow card) 43'; Asrankulov (yellow card) 65'; Chesnokov 76'	Report	Kenesbek (yellow card) 22'; Narzildayev (yellow card) 49'; Gromyko 51'; Norbekov 90+2'; Yudenkov (yellow card) 90+5'	Stadium: Central Stadium; Attendance: 4,600; Referee: Denis Izmailov

15 June 2024 11	Tobol	1–0	Kairat	Kostanay
19:00 (UTC+5)	Ivanović 31'; Pokatilov (yellow card) 90+5'	Report	Vasin (yellow card) 35'	Stadium: Central Stadium; Attendance: 5,000; Referee: Daniyar Sakhi

23 June 2024 12	Atyrau	0–0	Tobol	Atyrau
18:00 (UTC+5)		Report	Essien (yellow card) 40'; Valiullin (yellow card) 70'	Stadium: Munaishy Stadium; Attendance: 4,500; Referee: Denis Tevyashov

30 June 2024 13	Aktobe	3–4	Tobol	Aktobe
20:00 (UTC+5)	Kasym 52'; Romero 58' (pen.), 90+1'; Kenesov (yellow card) 75'; Strumia (yellow card) 76'; Vătăjelu (yellow card) 90+6'	Report	Chesnokov 16', 73' (yellow card) 50'; El Messaoudi 27'; Ivanović 45' (yellow card) 63'; Pokatilov (yellow card) 88'	Stadium: Central Stadium; Attendance: 12,400; Referee: Alexander Zatula

11 August 2024 14	Tobol	1–2	Kyzylzhar	Kostanay
20:00 (UTC+5)	Chesnokov 26'	Report	Jovančić (yellow card) 20'; Zhaksybaev (yellow card) 30'; Imnadze 44'; Ospanov (yellow card) 73' (goal) 82'; Dovgal (yellow card) 90+5'	Stadium: Central Stadium; Attendance: 3,500; Referee: Georgy Chekhovsky
Note: Match originally scheduled for 14 July, but postponed due to Tobol's participation in the 2024–25 UEFA Europa League.

18 August 2024 17	Zhetysu	0–3	Tobol	Taldykorgan
18:00 (UTC+5)	Kuchinsky (yellow card) 38'; Karaman (yellow card) 67'; Charleston (yellow card) 90+2'	Report	Costa 2'; Chesnokov 40' (pen.), 51'; Ivanović (yellow card) 59'	Stadium: Zhetysu Stadium; Attendance: 2,000; Referee: Baghdad Abdullayev

25 August 2024 18	Kairat	2–2	Tobol	Almaty
18:00 (UTC+5)	João Paulo 20'; Seydakhmet (yellow card) 44'; Ulshin 55' (yellow card) 55'; Gromyko (yellow card) 71'	Report	Chesnokov (yellow card) 42'; El Messaoudi 53' (yellow card) 80'; Henen 73' (yellow card) 89'	Stadium: Central Stadium; Attendance: 11,456; Referee: Sakhi Daniyar

31 August 2024 19	Tobol	1–1	Atyrau	Kostanay
18:00 (UTC+5)	Chesnokov 71'; Asrankulov (yellow card) 90+5'; Essien (yellow card) 90+8'	Report	Signevich 12'; Barbosa (yellow card) 45+2'; Stasevich (yellow card) 55'; Najaryan (yellow card) 90+2'	Stadium: Central Stadium; Attendance: 3,000; Referee: Rustam Omarov

15 September 2024 20	Elimai	2–1	Tobol	Semey
17:00 (UTC+5)	Mashukov 10'; Payruz (yellow card) 67'; Korzun 89'	Report	Ndiaye (yellow card) 51'; Chesnokov 90+4'	Stadium: Spartak Stadium; Attendance: 7,500; Referee: Bulat Sariev

22 September 2024 21	Tobol	3–0	Aktobe	Kostanay
19:00 (UTC+5)	Chesnokov 32'; Asrankulov (yellow card) 38'; Mosiashvili (yellow card) 51'; Gabarayev (yellow card) 63'; El Messaoudi 65'; Costa 86'	Report	Agbo (yellow card) 26' (yellow-red card) 44'; Kairov (yellow card) 80'	Stadium: Central Stadium; Attendance: 4,100; Referee: Denis Izmailov

28 September 2024 16	Tobol	1–0	Shakhter Karagandy	Kostanay
18:00 (UTC+5)	Chesnokov (penalty missed) 79'; Zuyev 88'; Tapalov (yellow card) 90+4'	Report	Ryzhuk (yellow card) 16'; Đokić (yellow card) 58'; Cañas (yellow card) 68'; Ilic (yellow card) 75'; Adams (yellow card) 90+2'	Stadium: Central Stadium; Attendance: 4,000; Referee: Sergey Nozhenko

4 October 2024 22	Zhenis	2–1	Tobol	Karaganda
16:00 (UTC+5)	Volkov (yellow card) 17'; Silva 18' (yellow card) 59'; Pantsulaia (yellow card) 23' (goal) 44'; Adílio (yellow card) 54'; Prokopenko (yellow card) 90+4'	Report	Chesnokov (yellow card) 57'; Costa 76'	Stadium: Shakhter Stadium; Attendance: 300; Referee: Danil Gorda

19 October 2024 23	Tobol	1–0	Ordabasy	Kostanay
18:00 (UTC+5)	Tapalov 32'; Asrankulov (yellow card) 66'; Costa (yellow card) 85'	Report	Yerlanov (yellow card) 51'; Yakhshiboev (red card) 86'; Tungyshbayev (yellow card) 90'	Stadium: Central Stadium; Attendance: 2,800; Referee: Georgy Chekhovsky

23 October 2024 15	Turan	0–2	Tobol	Turkistan
16:00 (UTC+5)	Satanov (yellow card) 32'; Fejzaj (yellow card) 34'; Arkhipov (yellow card) 45'; Velkoski (yellow card) 48'	Report	Costa 21'; Chesnokov 59'; Tapalov (yellow card) 86'	Stadium: Turkistan Arena; Attendance: 1,500; Referee: Ruslan Sultangaliev
Note: Match originally scheduled for 28 July 2024, but postponed due to Tobols participation in the UEFA Conference League.

24	Aksu	BYE	Tobol	Pavlodar
(UTC+5)				Stadium: Central Stadium

3 November 2024 25	Tobol	1–0	Astana	Kostanay
16:00 (UTC+5)	Tapalov (yellow card) 48'; Ivanović 51'; Pokatilov (yellow card) 90+6'	Report	Amanović (yellow card) 57'	Stadium: Central Stadium; Attendance: 2,970; Referee: Ruslan Sultangaliev

10 November 2024 26	Kaisar	2–0	Tobol	Kyzylorda
14:00 (UTC+5)	Narzildayev (yellow card) 2'; Sovpel 29', 49'; Zhaksylykov (yellow card) 41'; Kalmuratov (yellow card) 71'	Report	Chesnokov (yellow card) 17'	Stadium: Gani Muratbayev Stadium; Attendance: 2,000; Referee: Aydin Tasybaev

==== League table ====
Pos	Team	Pld	W	D	L	GF	GA	GD	Pts	Qualification or relegation
3	Aktobe (W)	24	12	7	5	39	26	+13	43	Qualification for the Europa League first qualifying round (Note: Aktobe qualified for the Europa League first qualifying round by winning the 2024 Kazakhstan Cup.)
4	Ordabasy	24	12	6	6	36	24	+12	42	Qualification for the Conference League first qualifying round
5	Tobol	24	11	6	7	33	23	+10	39	
6	Elimai	24	10	7	7	35	32	+3	37	
7	Atyrau	24	9	8	7	28	20	+8	35	

Source: UEFA, Soccerway, QFL
Rules for classification: 1) Points; 2) Goal difference; 3) Matches won; 4) Goals scored; 5) Away goals scored; 6) Head-to-head points; 7) Head-to-head matches won; 8) Head-to-head goal difference; 9) Head-to-head goals scored; 10) Head-to-head away goals scored; 11) Draw.
(W) Cup winners

=== Kazakhstan Cup ===
13 April 2024 Round of 16	Kaisar	0–3	Tobol	Kyzylorda
14:00 (UTC+5)	Kobuladze (yellow card) 34'; Kenesbek (yellow card) 82'	Report	El Messaoudi 27', 84'; Gabarayev (yellow card) 37'; Tsonev 60'; Miladinović (yellow card) 63'; Galym (yellow card) 90+1'	Stadium: Gani Muratbayev Stadium; Attendance: 1,000; Referee: Sayat Sulikanov

8 May 2024 Quarterfinal	Tobol	1–0	Astana	Kostanay
18:00 (UTC+5)	Chesnokov 20' (yellow card) 90+4'; Gabarayev (yellow card) 72'	Report	Astanov (yellow card) 72'	Stadium: Central Stadium; Attendance: 2,850; Referee: Bulat Sariev

29 May 2024 Semifinal 1st leg	Tobol	1–0	Atyrau	Kostanay
18:00 (UTC+5)	Miladinović (yellow card) 24'; El Messaoudi 40' (pen.); Tapalov (yellow card) 44'; Cooper (yellow card) 87'	Report	Najaryan (yellow card) 22'; Kerimzhanov (yellow card) 38'; Olimzoda (yellow card) 90+2'	Stadium: Central Stadium; Attendance: 4,000; Referee: Artem Kuchin

19 June 2024 Semifinal 2nd leg	Atyrau	4–0 (4–1 agg.)	Tobol	Atyrau
18:00 (UTC+5)	Signevich 18', 52' (yellow card) 66'; Novak (yellow card) 22' (goal) 40'; Kerimzhanov (yellow card) 66'; Dzhumatov 90+9'	Report	Ndiaye (yellow card) 34'; Gabarayev (yellow card) 47'; Ivanović (yellow card) 80'	Stadium: Munaishy Stadium; Attendance: 3,500; Referee: Bulat Sariev

=== League Cup ===
==== Group stage ====
Pos	Team	Pld	W	D	L	GF	GA	GD	Pts	Qualification
1	Zhenis	2	1	0	1	2	1	+1	3	Advanced to Semifinals
2	Aktobe	2	1	0	1	2	2	0	3	Advanced to Semifinals
3	Tobol	2	1	0	1	2	2	0	3	
4	Kaisar	2	1	0	1	1	2	−1	3	

Updated to match(es) played on 6 July 2024. Source:

25 May 2024 1	Zhenis	2–0	Tobol	Karaganda
17:00 (UTC+5)	Volkov (yellow card) 9'; Belančić (yellow card) 14' (goal) 27'; Zulfiu (yellow card) 52'; Bidzinashvili (yellow card) 65'; Prokopenko 84'	Report	Galym (yellow card) 59'	Stadium: Shakhter Stadium; Attendance: 50; Referee: Saken Baimbet

6 July 2024 2	Tobol	2–0	Aktobe	Kostanay
18:00 (UTC+5)	Zhaylaubaev (yellow card) 9'; Tsonev 29'; Zhumadelov 47'; Galym (yellow card) 57'	Report		Stadium: Central Stadium; Attendance: 3,000; Referee: Rustam Omarov

21 July 2024 3	Kaisar	5–1	Tobol	Kyzylorda
20:00 (UTC+5)	Zhangylyshbay 3', 16'; Narzildayev 24'; Zhalmukan 36'; Torekul 47'; Kenesbek (yellow card) 68'; Kobuladze (yellow card) 79'	Report	Minaidarov 70' (pen.)	Stadium: Gani Muratbayev Stadium; Attendance: 3,000; Referee: Danil Gorda

=== UEFA Europa League ===
==== Qualifying rounds ====
11 July 2024 First qualifying round 1st leg	Ružomberok (Slovakia)	5–2	(Kazakhstan) Tobol	Ružomberok, Slovakia
22:00 (UTC+5)	Gabriel 11', 88' (yellow card) 56'; Selecký 40' (yellow card) 66'; Malý 45+3'; Madleňák 77'; Luterán (yellow card) 90+2'	Report	Ivanović 9'; Chesnokov (yellow card) 33'; Henen 45'; Gabarayev (yellow card) 47'; Shakhov (yellow card) 64'; Ndiaye (yellow card) 87'; Miladinović (yellow card) 90'	Stadium: Štadión pod Čebraťom; Referee: Kyriakos Athanasiou (Cyprus)

18 July 2024 First qualifying round 2nd leg	Tobol (Kazakhstan)	1–0 (3–5 agg.)	(Slovakia) Ružomberok	Kostanay, Kazakhstan
20:00 (UTC+5)	El Messaoudi 8'	Report		Stadium: Central Stadium; Attendance: 6,830; Referee: Mikkel Redder (Denmark)

=== UEFA Conference League ===
==== Qualifying rounds ====
25 July 2024 Second qualifying round 1st leg	St. Gallen (Switzerland)	4–1	(Kazakhstan) Tobol	St. Gallen, Switerzland
23:00 (UTC+5)	Stevanović 35'; Akolo 39'; Toma 77'; Quintillà (yellow card) 89'; Vallci 90+7'	Report	Mosiashvili (yellow card) 18'; Vallci 28' (o.g.); Asrankulov (yellow card) 45+3'; Essien (yellow card) 62'; El Messaoudi (yellow card) 82'; Chesnokov (yellow card) 85'	Stadium: Kybunpark; Attendance: 11,300; Referee: Rob Harvey (Republic of Ireland)

1 August 2024 Second qualifying round 2nd leg	Tobol (Kazakhstan)	0–1 (1–5 agg.)	(Switzerland) St. Gallen	Kostanay, Kazakhstan
21:00 (UTC+5)	Essien (yellow card) 58' (yellow-red card) 68'; Galym (red card) 90'; Miladinović (yellow card) 90'	Report	Cissé 73'; Stanić (yellow card) 81'; Yannick (yellow card) 90'	Stadium: Central Stadium; Attendance: 5,842; Referee: Joni Hyytiä (Finland)

== Squad statistics ==
As of match played 10 November 2024

=== Appearances and goals ===
No.	Pos	Nat	Player	Total		Premier League		Kazakhstan Cup		League Cup		Super Cup		UEFA Europa League		UEFA Conference League	
No.	Pos	Nat	Player	Apps	Goals	Apps	Goals	Apps	Goals	Apps	Goals	Apps	Goals	Apps	Goals	Apps	Goals
1	GK	(Kazakhstan) KAZ	Stas Pokatilov	33	0	24	0	4	0	0	0	1	0	2	0	2	0
3	DF	(Kazakhstan) KAZ	Roman Asrankulov	30	0	21+1	0	3+1	0	0	0	1	0	1	0	2	0
4	DF	(Kazakhstan) KAZ	Ermek Abdulla	1	0	0	0	0	0	1	0	0	0	0	0	0	0
5	DF	(France) FRA	Pape-Alioune Ndiaye	32	1	22+1	1	4	0	0	0	1	0	2	0	2	0
6	MF	(Nigeria) NGA	Ededem Essien	31	0	21+1	0	3+1	0	0	0	1	0	2	0	2	0
7	FW	(Kazakhstan) KAZ	Zhaslan Zhumashev	26	0	4+14	0	3+1	0	0	0	0	0	1+1	0	0+2	0
8	MF	(Morocco) MAR	Ahmed El Messaoudi	33	8	24	4	4	3	0	0	1	0	2	1	2	0
10	MF	(Serbia) SRB	Igor Ivanović	31	6	22	5	4	0	0	0	1	0	2	1	2	0
11	MF	(Kazakhstan) KAZ	Islam Chesnokov	29	11	21	10	3	1	0	0	1	0	2	0	2	0
12	GK	(Kazakhstan) KAZ	Sultan Busurmanov	2	0	0	0	0	0	2	0	0	0	0	0	0	0
13	MF	(Georgia (country)) GEO	Tsotne Mosiashvili	16	0	9+3	0	0	0	0	0	0	0	1+1	0	2	0
15	DF	(Russia) RUS	Albert Gabarayev	31	0	21+2	0	3	0	0	0	1	0	2	0	2	0
16	MF	(Kazakhstan) KAZ	Yerkin Tapalov	27	2	12+7	2	3	0	0	0	0+1	0	1+1	0	1+1	0
18	MF	(Kazakhstan) KAZ	Aleksandr Zuyev	13	1	3+9	1	0	0	0	0	0	0	0	0	0+1	0
19	MF	(Kazakhstan) KAZ	Ruslan Valiullin	16	0	2+9	0	1+2	0	2	0	0	0	0	0	0	0
20	FW	(Portugal) POR	Rui Costa	16	4	8+4	4	0	0	0	0	0	0	0+2	0	1+1	0
21	MF	(Bulgaria) BUL	Radoslav Tsonev	22	2	4+12	0	2+1	1	1	1	0	0	0	0	0+2	0
22	MF	(Kazakhstan) KAZ	Nurbek Bayzhanov	1	0	0	0	0	0	1	0	0	0	0	0	0	0
23	MF	(Kazakhstan) KAZ	Nurgaini Buribaev	2	0	0+1	0	0	0	1	0	0	0	0	0	0	0
25	DF	(Kazakhstan) KAZ	Roman Bozhko	4	0	0+2	0	0	0	2	0	0	0	0	0	0	0
26	FW	(Kazakhstan) KAZ	Nurbol Zhumadelov	4	1	0+1	0	0	0	2+1	1	0	0	0	0	0	0
27	GK	(Kazakhstan) KAZ	David Mukhin	1	0	0	0	0	0	1	0	0	0	0	0	0	0
30	FW	(Kazakhstan) KAZ	Ali Abdibek	1	0	0	0	0	0	1	0	0	0	0	0	0	0
33	DF	(Kazakhstan) KAZ	Asan Bitekenov	1	0	0	0	0	0	1	0	0	0	0	0	0	0
34	MF	(Kazakhstan) KAZ	Sultan Bakhytkiriev	1	0	0	0	0	0	0+1	0	0	0	0	0	0	0
36	MF	(Kazakhstan) KAZ	Shakhmurza Adyrbekov	3	0	0	0	0+1	0	1+1	0	0	0	0	0	0	0
37	DF	(Kazakhstan) KAZ	Valery Usinevich	2	0	0	0	0	0	2	0	0	0	0	0	0	0
38	DF	(Kazakhstan) KAZ	Amanzhol Bakitzhanov	6	0	0+1	0	0+2	0	2+1	0	0	0	0	0	0	0
40	MF	(Kazakhstan) KAZ	Timur Igubaev	3	0	0	0	0	0	2+1	0	0	0	0	0	0	0
42	DF	(Kazakhstan) KAZ	Evgeniy Kochetkov	1	0	0	0	0	0	1	0	0	0	0	0	0	0
43	FW	(Kazakhstan) KAZ	Dias Nurkanov	3	0	0	0	0	0	1+2	0	0	0	0	0	0	0
44	MF	(Kazakhstan) KAZ	Nurislam Nurgeldinov	2	0	0	0	0	0	1+1	0	0	0	0	0	0	0
47	MF	(Kazakhstan) KAZ	Saduakas Saduakas	1	0	0	0	0	0	1	0	0	0	0	0	0	0
49	DF	(Kazakhstan) KAZ	Maxim Kononenko	2	0	0	0	0	0	1+1	0	0	0	0	0	0	0
50	MF	(Kazakhstan) KAZ	Alibek Zhaylaubaev	3	0	0	0	0	0	2+1	0	0	0	0	0	0	0
51	MF	(Kazakhstan) KAZ	Beybit Galym	13	0	0+7	0	0+2	0	1+1	0	0	0	0	0	0+2	0
52	MF	(Kazakhstan) KAZ	Vladislav Shchurko	1	0	0	0	0	0	1	0	0	0	0	0	0	0
53	DF	(Kazakhstan) KAZ	Bekzat Minaydarov	2	1	0	0	0	0	1+1	1	0	0	0	0	0	0
55	DF	(Serbia) SRB	Ivan Miladinović	28	1	19	0	3	0	1	0	1	1	1+1	0	2	0
57	MF	(Kazakhstan) KAZ	Azamat Zinadin	2	0	0	0	0	0	0+2	0	0	0	0	0	0	0
77	FW	(Togo) TOG	David Henen	25	4	8+11	3	3	0	0	0	1	0	2	1	0	0
99	MF	(Portugal) POR	Pedro Eugénio	6	0	0+6	0	0	0	0	0	0	0	0	0	0	0
Players away from Tobol on loan:
Players who left Tobol during the season:
28	MF	(Ukraine) UKR	Yevhen Shakhov	15	1	10	1	2+1	0	0	0	1	0	1	0	0	0
66	DF	(Kosovo) KOS	David Domgjoni	7	0	3+2	0	1+1	0	0	0	0	0	0	0	0	0
90	FW	(Italy) ITA	Godberg Cooper	16	2	6+5	2	2+2	0	0	0	0+1	0	0	0	0	0

=== Goal scorers ===
Place	Position	Nation	Number	Name	Premier League	Kazakhstan Cup	League Cup	Super Cup	UEFA Europa League	UEFA Conference League	Total
1	MF	(Kazakhstan)	11	Islam Chesnokov	10	1	0	0	0	0	11
2	MF	(Morocco)	8	Ahmed El Messaoudi	4	3	0	0	1	0	8
3	MF	(Serbia)	10	Igor Ivanović	5	0	0	0	1	0	6
4	FW	(Portugal)	20	Rui Costa	4	0	0	0	0	0	4
4	FW	(Togo)	77	David Henen	3	0	0	0	1	0	4
6	FW	(Italy)	90	Godberg Cooper	2	0	0	0	0	0	2
6	MF	(Kazakhstan)	16	Yerkin Tapalov	2	0	0	0	0	0	2
6	MF	(Bulgaria)	21	Radoslav Tsonev	0	1	1	0	0	0	2
9	DF	(France)	5	Pape-Alioune Ndiaye	1	0	0	0	0	0	1
9	MF	(Ukraine)	28	Yevhen Shakhov	1	0	0	0	0	0	1
9	MF	(Kazakhstan)	18	Aleksandr Zuyev	1	0	0	0	0	0	1
9	FW	(Kazakhstan)	26	Nurbol Zhumadelov	0	0	1	0	0	0	1
9	FW	(Kazakhstan)	53	Bekzat Minaydarov	0	0	1	0	0	0	1
9	DF	(Serbia)	55	Ivan Miladinović	0	0	0	1	0	0	1
9				Own goal	0	0	0	0	0	1	1
				TOTALS	33	5	3	1	3	1	46

=== Clean sheets ===
Place	Position	Nation	Number	Name	Premier League	Kazakhstan Cup	League Cup	Super Cup	UEFA Europa League	UEFA Conference League	Total
1	GK	(Kazakhstan)	1	Stas Pokatilov	11	3	0	0	1	0	15
2	GK	(Kazakhstan)	12	Sultan Busurmanov	0	0	1	0	0	0	1
				TOTALS	11	3	1	0	1	0	16

=== Disciplinary record ===
Number	Nation	Position	Name	Premier League		Kazakhstan Cup		League Cup		Super Cup		UEFA Europa League		UEFA Conference League		Total	
Number	Nation	Position	Name	Booked	Sent off (straight red)	Booked	Sent off (straight red)	Booked	Sent off (straight red)	Booked	Sent off (straight red)	Booked	Sent off (straight red)	Booked	Sent off (straight red)	(yellow card) 0	Sent off (straight red)
1	(Kazakhstan)	GK	Stas Pokatilov	3	0	0	0	0	0	0	0	0	0	0	0	3	0
3	(Kazakhstan)	DF	Roman Asrankulov	6	0	0	0	0	0	0	0	0	0	1	0	7	0
4	(Kazakhstan)	DF	Ermek Abdulla	0	1	0	0	0	0	0	0	0	0	0	0	0	1
5	(France)	DF	Pape-Alioune Ndiaye	5	0	1	0	0	0	0	0	1	0	0	0	7	0
6	(Nigeria)	MF	Ededem Essien	4	0	0	0	0	0	0	0	0	0	3	1	7	1
7	(Kazakhstan)	FW	Zhaslan Zhumashev	1	0	0	0	0	0	0	0	0	0	0	0	1	0
8	(Morocco)	MF	Ahmed El Messaoudi	2	0	0	0	0	0	0	0	0	0	1	0	3	0
10	(Serbia)	MF	Igor Ivanović	5	0	1	0	0	0	0	0	0	0	0	0	6	0
11	(Kazakhstan)	MF	Islam Chesnokov	4	0	1	0	0	0	0	0	1	0	1	0	7	0
13	(Georgia (country))	MF	Tsotne Mosiashvili	1	0	0	0	0	0	0	0	0	0	1	0	2	0
15	(Russia)	DF	Albert Gabarayev	3	0	3	0	0	0	1	0	1	0	0	0	8	0
16	(Kazakhstan)	MF	Yerkin Tapalov	5	0	1	0	0	0	0	0	0	0	0	0	6	0
19	(Kazakhstan)	MF	Ruslan Valiullin	1	0	0	0	0	0	0	0	0	0	0	0	1	0
20	(Portugal)	FW	Rui Costa	1	0	0	0	0	0	0	0	0	0	0	0	1	0
21	(Bulgaria)	MF	Radoslav Tsonev	2	0	0	0	0	0	0	0	0	0	0	0	2	0
50	(Kazakhstan)	MF	Alibek Zhaylaubaev	0	0	0	0	1	0	0	0	0	0	0	0	1	0
51	(Kazakhstan)	MF	Beybit Galym	0	0	1	0	2	0	0	0	0	0	0	1	3	1
55	(Serbia)	DF	Ivan Miladinović	2	1	2	0	0	0	0	0	1	0	1	0	6	1
77	(Togo)	FW	David Henen	4	0	0	0	0	0	0	0	1	0	0	0	5	0
Players who left Tobol during the season:
28	(Ukraine)	MF	Yevhen Shakhov	1	0	0	0	0	0	0	0	1	0	0	0	2	0
66	(Kosovo)	DF	David Domgjoni	1	0	0	0	0	0	0	0	0	0	0	0	1	0
90	(Italy)	FW	Godberg Cooper	2	0	1	0	0	0	0	0	0	0	0	0	3	0
			TOTALS	53	2	11	0	3	0	1	0	6	0	8	2	82	4
