= List of Kazakhstan football transfers winter 2023–24 =

This is a list of Kazakh football transfers during the 2023 winter transfer window.

== Kazakhstan Premier League 2024 ==
=== Aktobe ===
In: Note: Flags indicate national team as defined under FIFA eligibility rules; some limited exceptions apply. Players may hold more than one non-FIFA nationality.

No.	Pos.	Nation	Player
4	MF	NGA	Uche Agbo (from (Slovakia) Slovan Bratislava)
11	FW	RUS	Idris Umayev (from (Russia) Akhmat Grozny, previously on loan)
12	FW	GUI	Amadou Doumbouya (from (Bulgaria) Botev Plovdiv)
15	DF	CMR	Gaby Kiki (from (Moldova) Sheriff Tiraspol)
16	MF	ECU	José Cevallos (from (Ecuador) Emelec)
17	FW	DOM	Dorny Romero (from (Bolivia) Always Ready)
18	MF	HAI	Jayro Jean (from (Bolivia) Always Ready)
20	MF	KAZ	Ramazan Orazov (from (Slovenia) Koper)
24	DF	KAZ	Bagdat Kairov (from (Kazakhstan) Tobol)
25	GK	KAZ	Evgeniy Sitdikov
30	GK	KAZ	Igor Shatsky (from (Kazakhstan) Shakhter Karagandy)
44	DF	CRO	Mateo Barać (from (Russia) Krylia Sovetov)
88	DF	ROU	Bogdan Vătăjelu (from (Romania) Universitatea Cluj)

Out: Note: Flags indicate national team as defined under FIFA eligibility rules; some limited exceptions apply. Players may hold more than one non-FIFA nationality.

No.	Pos.	Nation	Player
1	GK	KAZ	Stas Pokatilov (to (Kazakhstan) Tobol)
4	DF	GEO	Luka Gadrani (to (Kazakhstan) Kairat)
14	DF	KAZ	Yeskendir Kybyrai
15	MF	CIV	Anderson Niangbo (loan return to (Belgium) Gent)
19	MF	MNE	Miloš Raičković (to (Montenegro) Budućnost Podgorica)
20	FW	BRA	China (to (Kazakhstan) Yelimay)
21	MF	CRO	Andrija Filipović (to (Hungary) Kisvárda)
23	DF	RUS	Daniil Penchikov (loan return to (Russia) Pari Nizhny Novgorod)
41	GK	RUS	Miroslav Lobantsev (to (Kazakhstan) Yelimay)
66	FW	ISR	Ihab Ghanayem (to (Israel) Hapoel Tel Aviv)
77	DF	KAZ	Dmitry Shomko (to (Kazakhstan) Yelimay)
88	DF	RUS	Dmitri Yashin (to (Kazakhstan) Yelimay)
93	FW	BRA	Élder Santana (to (Kazakhstan) Kairat)
99	FW	RUS	Roman Izotov

=== Astana ===
In: Note: Flags indicate national team as defined under FIFA eligibility rules; some limited exceptions apply. Players may hold more than one non-FIFA nationality.

No.	Pos.	Nation	Player
4	DF	KAZ	Marat Bystrov (from (Russia) Akhmat Grozny)
5	DF	LTU	Kipras Kažukolovas (from (Lithuania) Žalgiris)
9	FW	ESP	Carlitos (from (Greece) PAS Lamia 1964)
17	DF	GRE	Giannis Masouras (from (Greece) AE Kifisia)
19	MF	GHA	Barnes Osei (from (Georgia (country)) Dinamo Tbilisi)
28	FW	GUI	Ousmane Camara (from (Georgia (country)) Dinamo Tbilisi)
66	DF	KAZ	Talgat Kusyapov (loan return from (Kazakhstan) Caspiy)
74	GK	KAZ	Mukhammedzhan Seysen (from (Kazakhstan) Ordabasy)
81	FW	KAZ	Ramazan Karimov (from (Kazakhstan) Maktaaral)

Out: Note: Flags indicate national team as defined under FIFA eligibility rules; some limited exceptions apply. Players may hold more than one non-FIFA nationality.

No.	Pos.	Nation	Player
3	DF	ARM	Varazdat Haroyan (to (China) Qingdao West Coast)
11	MF	KAZ	Aslan Darabayev
13	DF	ARM	Kamo Hovhannisyan (to Ararat-Armenia)
17	FW	KAZ	Abat Aymbetov (to (Turkey) Adana Demirspor)
18	DF	KAZ	Sagi Sovet (to (Kazakhstan) Zhenis, previously on loan from (Kazakhstan) Okzhetpes)
29	MF	SRB	Dušan Jovančić (on loan to (Greece) AE Kifisia)
30	MF	SRB	Igor Ivanović (to (Kazakhstan) Tobol)
33	DF	MNE	Žarko Tomašević
44	MF	BIH	Stjepan Lončar (loan return to (Hungary) Ferencváros)
65	MF	KAZ	Meyrambek Kalmyrza (to (Kazakhstan) Zhetysu, previously on loan to (Kazakhstan) Okzhetpes)
88	FW	GAM	Dembo Darboe (loan return to (United Arab Emirates) Al-Nasr)

=== Atyrau ===
In: Note: Flags indicate national team as defined under FIFA eligibility rules; some limited exceptions apply. Players may hold more than one non-FIFA nationality.

No.	Pos.	Nation	Player
9	MF	POR	Pedro Eugénio
11	MF	KAZ	Aslan Adil (from (Kazakhstan) Zhetysu)
12	FW	GAM	Lamine Jarjou (on loan from (France) Grenoble)
16	DF	BRA	Mateus Barbosa (from (Greece) AE Kifisia)
15	FW	KAZ	Edige Oralbay (from (Kazakhstan) Kyran)
17	MF	COD	Joel Kayamba (from (Turkey) Boluspor)
90	GK	KAZ	Vladislav Saenko (from (Kazakhstan) Ekibastuz)
—	DF	KAZ	Doskhan Duysembek (from (Kazakhstan) Ekibastuz)
—	DF	TJK	Fakhriddin Akhtamov (from (Tajikistan) Khujand)

Out: Note: Flags indicate national team as defined under FIFA eligibility rules; some limited exceptions apply. Players may hold more than one non-FIFA nationality.

No.	Pos.	Nation	Player
5	MF	LTU	Domantas Antanavičius (to (Lithuania) Hegelmann)
9	FW	NGA	Effiong Nsungusi (loan return to (Denmark) HB Køge)
10	FW	MKD	Demir Imeri (to (Uzbekistan) Andijon)
11	MF	RUS	Yevgeni Kozlov (to (India) Mohammedan SC)
16	GK	KAZ	Ilya Karavaev
17	FW	KAZ	Oralkhan Omirtayev (to (Belarus) Slutsk)
29	MF	MKD	Florijan Kadriu (to (Albania) Erzeni)
30	DF	BRA	Matheus Bissi
—	DF	TJK	Fakhriddin Akhtamov (on loan to (Tajikistan) Khujand)

=== Kairat ===
In: Note: Flags indicate national team as defined under FIFA eligibility rules; some limited exceptions apply. Players may hold more than one non-FIFA nationality.

No.	Pos.	Nation	Player
3	DF	UZB	Ibrokhimkhalil Yuldoshev (on loan from (Russia) Pari Nizhny Novgorod)
7	MF	GEO	Giorgi Zaria (from (Georgia (country)) Dinamo Batumi)
15	DF	ISR	Ofri Arad (from (Israel) Maccabi Haifa, previously on loan)
19	FW	BRA	Élder Santana (from (Kazakhstan) Aktobe)
44	DF	GEO	Luka Gadrani (from (Kazakhstan) Aktobe)

Out: Note: Flags indicate national team as defined under FIFA eligibility rules; some limited exceptions apply. Players may hold more than one non-FIFA nationality.

No.	Pos.	Nation	Player
3	DF	CMR	Macky Bagnack
6	DF	KAZ	Sergey Keiler (to (Kazakhstan) Yelimay)
8	MF	RUS	Anton Krachkovsky (to (Russia) Dynamo Makhachkala)
10	FW	KAZ	Artur Shushenachev (to (Israel) Hapoel Be'er Sheva)
—	DF	KAZ	Mikael Askarov (to (Belarus) Smorgon)
—	MF	KAZ	Alen Aymanov (to (Kazakhstan) Yelimay, previously on loan)
—	MF	KAZ	Roman Chirkov (to (Kazakhstan) Akzhayik, previously on loan)
—	FW	KAZ	Bayzhan Madelkhan (to (Kazakhstan) Aksu)

=== Kaisar ===
In: Note: Flags indicate national team as defined under FIFA eligibility rules; some limited exceptions apply. Players may hold more than one non-FIFA nationality.

No.	Pos.	Nation	Player
6	MF	BLR	Ruslan Yudenkov (from (Kazakhstan) Maktaaral)
10	MF	KAZ	Duman Narzildayev (from (Kazakhstan) Ordabasy)
12	FW	KAZ	Toktar Zhangylyshbay (from (Kazakhstan) Maktaaral)
17	MF	KAZ	Kuanysh Kalmuratov (from (Kazakhstan) Taraz)
19	FW	KAZ	Aybar Zhaksylykov (from (Kazakhstan) Ordabasy)
25	DF	GEO	Giorgi Kobuladze (from (Georgia (country)) Torpedo Kutaisi)
30	FW	UZB	Shokhnazar Norbekov
44	DF	MNE	Jovan Pajovic (from (Malta) Birkirkara)
55	DF	KAZ	Askar Satyshev (from (Kazakhstan) Turan)
99	FW	KAZ	Marlen Aymanov (from (Kazakhstan) Khan Tengri)
—	FW	GAM	Lamin Tunkara (from (Turkey) EFC-Antalya)

Out: Note: Flags indicate national team as defined under FIFA eligibility rules; some limited exceptions apply. Players may hold more than one non-FIFA nationality.

No.	Pos.	Nation	Player
8	MF	KAZ	Alibi Tuzakbaev (on loan to (Kazakhstan) Khan Tengri)
20	MF	MNE	Goran Milojko
27	MF	GEO	Giorgi Bukhaidze (to (Georgia (country)) Rustavi)
44	DF	BFA	Ben Aziz Zagré (to (Russia) Shinnik Yaroslavl)
45	FW	SRB	Nikola Dišić (to (China) Wuxi Wugo)
99	FW	BRA	João Pedro Oliveira (to (China) Qingdao Red Lions)

=== Kyzylzhar ===
In: Note: Flags indicate national team as defined under FIFA eligibility rules; some limited exceptions apply. Players may hold more than one non-FIFA nationality.

No.	Pos.	Nation	Player
2	DF	KAZ	Ular Zhaksybaev (from (Kazakhstan) Aksu)
3	DF	MNE	Mitar Ćuković (from (Lithuania) Riteriai)
9	FW	UKR	Oleksiy Shchebetun (from (Lithuania) Šiauliai)
20	MF	GEO	Irakli Bugridze (from (Georgia (country)) Torpedo Kutaisi)
23	DF	CRO	Zoran Nižić
30	GK	KAZ	Aleksandr Dovgal (from (Kazakhstan) Okzhetpes)
35	DF	LVA	Vladislavs Sorokins (from (Latvia) RFS)
88	MF	KAZ	Madi Khaseyn (from (Kazakhstan) Zhetysu)
91	MF	POR	Rúben Brígido
—	GK	BLR	Konstantin Rudenok (from (Belarus) Neman Grodno)

Out: Note: Flags indicate national team as defined under FIFA eligibility rules; some limited exceptions apply. Players may hold more than one non-FIFA nationality.

No.	Pos.	Nation	Player
2	DF	KAZ	Aldair Adilov (to (Kazakhstan) Zhenis)
3	DF	BLR	Nikita Naumov (to (Belarus) Vitebsk)
8	MF	UKR	Yuriy Bushman
9	FW	RUS	Maksim Chikanchi (to (Kazakhstan) Zhetysu)
11	DF	KAZ	Yerkin Tapalov (to (Kazakhstan) Tobol)
16	MF	KAZ	Marat Shakhmetov
19	MF	GEO	Luka Imnadze
21	MF	BIH	Mladen Veselinović
24	MF	ARG	Pablo Podio
25	GK	BLR	Roman Stepanov
32	GK	KAZ	Vadim Petrov
55	DF	CRO	Ivan Graf
89	DF	MNE	Darko Bulatović (to (Montenegro) Sutjeska Nikšić)
—	GK	BLR	Konstantin Rudenok

=== Ordabasy ===
In: Note: Flags indicate national team as defined under FIFA eligibility rules; some limited exceptions apply. Players may hold more than one non-FIFA nationality.

No.	Pos.	Nation	Player
2	DF	BRA	Reginaldo (from (Brazil) Água Santa)
4	MF	CRO	Lovro Cvek (from (Romania) CFR Cluj)
10	MF	UZB	Jasurbek Yakhshiboev (from (Uzbekistan) Navbahor Namangan)
12	GK	CRO	Karlo Sentić (on loan from (Croatia) Hajduk Split)
14	MF	KAZ	Samat Zharynbetov (from (Kazakhstan) Tobol)
17	DF	SRB	Zlatan Šehović (on loan from (Serbia) Partizan)
32	DF	UKR	Ihor Plastun (from (Bulgaria) Ludogorets Razgrad)
98	FW	GAM	Dembo Darboe (on loan from (United Arab Emirates) Al-Nasr)

Out: Note: Flags indicate national team as defined under FIFA eligibility rules; some limited exceptions apply. Players may hold more than one non-FIFA nationality.

No.	Pos.	Nation	Player
6	MF	KAZ	Duman Narzildayev (to (Kazakhstan) Kaisar)
6	FW	KAZ	Batyrkhan Tazhibay (to (Kazakhstan) Okzhetpes)
17	MF	KAZ	Akmal Bakhtiyarov (to (Russia) Chelyabinsk)
26	DF	SEN	Mamadou Mbodj (to (Israel) Hapoel Hadera)
27	MF	CRO	Bernardo Matić (to (Hungary) Kisvárda)
45	FW	UZB	Bobur Abdikholikov (to (Uzbekistan) Nasaf)
74	GK	KAZ	Mukhammedzhan Seysen (to (Kazakhstan) Astana)
77	FW	KAZ	Zikrillo Sultaniyazov (on loan to (Kazakhstan) Okzhetpes, previously on loan to (Kazakhstan) Turan)
88	MF	GNB	Jorginho (to (Georgia (country)) Torpedo Kutaisi)
96	DF	BRA	Auro Jr.
99	FW	KAZ	Aybar Zhaksylykov (to (Kazakhstan) Kaisar)
—	MF	BRA	Victor Braga (to (Kazakhstan) Zhetysu, previously on loan to (Kazakhstan) Maktaaral)

=== Shakhter ===
In: Note: Flags indicate national team as defined under FIFA eligibility rules; some limited exceptions apply. Players may hold more than one non-FIFA nationality.

No.	Pos.	Nation	Player
1	GK	MDA	Igor Mostovei (from (Moldova) Zimbru Chișinău)
4	DF	UKR	Dmytro Ryzhuk (from (Kazakhstan) Okzhetpes)
5	DF	SRB	Filip Stamenković (from (Uzbekistan) Metallurg Bekabad)
10	FW	GEO	Imeda Ashortia (from (Georgia (country)) Telavi)
20	MF	KAZ	Dmitry Bachek (from (Belarus) Arsenal Dzerzhinsk)
80	FW	COL	Juan Asprilla

Out: Note: Flags indicate national team as defined under FIFA eligibility rules; some limited exceptions apply. Players may hold more than one non-FIFA nationality.

No.	Pos.	Nation	Player
5	DF	BIH	Đorđe Ćosić (to (Bosnia and Herzegovina) Tuzla City)
6	DF	COL	Francisco Mina (to (Russia) Dynamo Makhachkala)
8	MF	SRB	Stefan Bukorac (to (Georgia (country)) Telavi)
7	FW	KAZ	Roman Murtazayev (to (Kazakhstan) Yelimay)
10	MF	GEO	Temur Chogadze (to (Uzbekistan) Nasaf)
11	FW	KAZ	Ivan Sviridov (to (Kazakhstan) Yelimay)
28	MF	KAZ	Yury Pertsukh (to (Kazakhstan) Yelimay)
30	GK	KAZ	Igor Shatsky (to (Kazakhstan) Aktobe)
33	DF	KAZ	Dinmukhamed Kashken (to (Kazakhstan) Khan-Tengri)
52	DF	KAZ	Konstantin Gorizanov (to (Kazakhstan) Ekibastuz)

=== Tobol ===
In: Note: Flags indicate national team as defined under FIFA eligibility rules; some limited exceptions apply. Players may hold more than one non-FIFA nationality.

No.	Pos.	Nation	Player
1	GK	KAZ	Stas Pokatilov (from (Kazakhstan) Aktobe)
4	DF	FRA	Pape-Alioune Ndiaye (from (Turkey) Şanlıurfaspor)
6	MF	NGA	Ededem Essien (from (Russia) Pari Nizhny Novgorod)
8	MF	MAR	Ahmed El Messaoudi (from (Netherlands) Emmen)
10	MF	SRB	Igor Ivanović (from (Kazakhstan) Astana, previously on loan)
15	DF	RUS	Albert Gabarayev (from (Russia) Rodina Moscow, previously on loan)
16	DF	KAZ	Yerkin Tapalov (from (Kazakhstan) Kyzylzhar)
21	MF	BUL	Radoslav Tsonev (from (Bulgaria) Arda Kardzhali)
23	MF	KAZ	Nurgaini Buribaev (from (Kazakhstan) Turan)
55	DF	SRB	Ivan Miladinović
66	DF	KOS	David Domgjoni (from (Turkey) Manisa)
77	FW	TOG	David Henen (from (Belgium) KV Kortrijk)
90	FW	ITA	Godberg Cooper (from (Romania) UTA Arad)

Out: Note: Flags indicate national team as defined under FIFA eligibility rules; some limited exceptions apply. Players may hold more than one non-FIFA nationality.

No.	Pos.	Nation	Player
4	DF	SRB	Ivan Rogač (to (Uzbekistan) Lokomotiv Tashkent)
6	MF	BIH	Jovan Ilić (to (Serbia) Novi Sad)
8	FW	CIV	Serges Déblé (to (Armenia) Pyunik)
10	MF	KAZ	Serikzhan Muzhikov (to (Kazakhstan) Zhetysu)
13	MF	BLR	Pavel Zabelin (to (Russia) Sokol Saratov)
14	MF	KAZ	Samat Zharynbetov (to (Kazakhstan) Ordabasy)
18	MF	RUS	Pavel Kireyenko
19	FW	BIH	Momčilo Mrkaić (to (Bosnia and Herzegovina) Sloga Meridian)
21	MF	SRB	Miljan Vukadinović (to (Serbia) Mladost Novi Sad)
23	GK	RUS	Ivan Konovalov (to (Russia) Baltika Kaliningrad)
24	DF	KAZ	Bagdat Kairov (to (Kazakhstan) Aktobe)
30	DF	SRB	Bojan Mlađović

=== Turan ===
In: Note: Flags indicate national team as defined under FIFA eligibility rules; some limited exceptions apply. Players may hold more than one non-FIFA nationality.

No.	Pos.	Nation	Player
2	DF	SRB	Marko Nikolić (from (Kazakhstan) Aksu)
8	MF	EST	Artjom Dmitrijev (from (Estonia) Nõmme Kalju)
9	FW	BOL	Leonardo Vaca (from (Lithuania) Žalgiris)
10	MF	TUN	Fedi Ben Choug (from (Morocco) Hassania Agadir)
15	DF	MKD	Viktor Velkoski (from (North Macedonia) Bregalnica Štip)
17	MF	CRO	Antonio Jakoliš (from (Russia) Fakel Voronezh)
18	FW	RUS	Pavel Kireyenko (from (Kazakhstan) Tobol)
22	FW	RUS	Artyom Arkhipov
24	MF	SRB	Nikola Cuckić (from (Kazakhstan) Zhetysu)
27	DF	SVK	Branislav Sluka (from (Slovakia) ViOn Zlaté Moravce)
55	MF	GHA	David Mawutor (from (Kazakhstan) Aksu)
77	MF	KAZ	Alisher Suley (from (Kazakhstan) Aksu)
—	MF	ARM	Harutyun Grigoryan (from (Russia) Chayka Peschanokopskoye)

Out: Note: Flags indicate national team as defined under FIFA eligibility rules; some limited exceptions apply. Players may hold more than one non-FIFA nationality.

No.	Pos.	Nation	Player
8	MF	KAZ	Abzal Taubay (to (Kazakhstan) Khan Tengri)
9	MF	KAZ	Nurgaini Buribaev (to (Kazakhstan) Tobol)
25	DF	RUS	Mikhail Bashilov (to (Belarus) Vitebsk)

=== Yelimay ===
In: Note: Flags indicate national team as defined under FIFA eligibility rules; some limited exceptions apply. Players may hold more than one non-FIFA nationality.

No.	Pos.	Nation	Player
7	FW	KAZ	Roman Murtazayev (from (Kazakhstan) Shakhter Karagandy)
8	MF	KAZ	Yury Pertsukh (from (Kazakhstan) Shakhter Karagandy)
9	FW	SEN	Sada Thioub
11	FW	KAZ	Ivan Sviridov (from (Kazakhstan) Shakhter Karagandy)
20	FW	BRA	China (from (Kazakhstan) Aktobe)
23	MF	BRA	Maicom David (from (Lithuania) Džiugas Telšiai)
29	FW	CMR	Robert Tambe (from (China) Jinan Xingzhou)
35	DF	BLR	Nikolay Zolotov (from (Ukraine) Kolos Kovalivka)
41	GK	RUS	Miroslav Lobantsev (from (Kazakhstan) Aktobe)
63	DF	BIH	Ivan Šaravanja (from (Bosnia and Herzegovina) Široki Brijeg)
77	DF	KAZ	Dmitry Shomko (from (Kazakhstan) Aktobe)
81	MF	BLR	Nikita Korzun (from (Belarus) Shakhtyor Soligorsk)
88	DF	RUS	Dmitri Yashin (from (Kazakhstan) Aktobe)
92	MF	FRA	Quentin Cornette (from (Greece) Volos)
99	MF	KAZ	Alen Aymanov (from (Kazakhstan) Kairat, previously on loan)

Out: Note: Flags indicate national team as defined under FIFA eligibility rules; some limited exceptions apply. Players may hold more than one non-FIFA nationality.

No.	Pos.	Nation	Player
3	MF	JPN	Takuya Matsunaga
6	MF	KAZ	Altynbek Saparov (to (Kazakhstan) Caspiy)
7	MF	KAZ	Arman Nusip (to (Kazakhstan) Caspiy)
9	FW	GEO	Beka Kavtaradze (to (Spain) Melilla)

=== Zhenis ===
In: Note: Flags indicate national team as defined under FIFA eligibility rules; some limited exceptions apply. Players may hold more than one non-FIFA nationality.

No.	Pos.	Nation	Player
2	FW	SVN	Matija Rom (from (Georgia (country)) Telavi)
3	DF	GEO	Zurab Tevzadze (from (Georgia (country)) Dila Gori)
4	DF	KAZ	Sagi Sovet (from (Kazakhstan) Astana)
6	DF	SWE	Benjamin Hjertstrand (from (Sweden) Halmstad)
9	FW	KOS	Arb Manaj (on loan from (Kosovo) Drita)
14	MF	GEO	Irakli Bidzinashvili (from (Georgia (country)) Dinamo Batumi)
15	DF	POL	Krystian Nowak (from (Republic of Ireland) Bohemian)
18	MF	BLR	Syarhey Volkaw (from (Belarus) BATE Borisov)
19	FW	SRB	Iljasa Zulfiu (on loan from (Kosovo) Dukagjini)
22	MF	BLR	Denis Grechikho (on loan from (Belarus) BATE Borisov)
23	DF	KAZ	Aldair Adilov (from (Kazakhstan) Kyzylzhar)
32	MF	GRE	Vasilios Karagounis (from (Greece) Kalamata)
54	DF	CRO	Marin Belancić (from (Croatia) HNK Cibalia)
99	FW	BRA	John Kleber (from (Uruguay) Juventud)

Out: Note: Flags indicate national team as defined under FIFA eligibility rules; some limited exceptions apply. Players may hold more than one non-FIFA nationality.

No.	Pos.	Nation	Player
1	GK	RUS	Aleksandr Timchenko (to (Kyrgyzstan) Muras United)
2	DF	KAZ	Mikhail Aubakirov (Retired)
3	DF	GEO	Lasha Kasradze (to (Georgia (country)) Rustavi)
8	DF	KAZ	Rustam Temirkhan
9	FW	GEO	Tamaz Makatsaria
24	DF	KAZ	Darkhan Dyumsembekov (on loan to (Kazakhstan) SD Family)
25	DF	KAZ	Birzhan Kulbekov (Retired)
44	MF	RUS	Nikita Laktionov
45	FW	GAM	Pa Omar Jobe (to (Tanzania) Simba)

=== Zhetysu ===
In: Note: Flags indicate national team as defined under FIFA eligibility rules; some limited exceptions apply. Players may hold more than one non-FIFA nationality.

No.	Pos.	Nation	Player
4	DF	GEO	Gia Chaduneli (from (Georgia (country)) Iberia 1999)
6	DF	KAZ	Meyrambek Kalmyrza (from (Kazakhstan) Astana)
7	MF	KAZ	Serikzhan Muzhikov (from (Kazakhstan) Tobol)
8	MF	KAZ	Dinmukhamed Karaman (from (Kazakhstan) Taraz)
9	FW	RUS	Maksim Chikanchi (from (Kazakhstan) Kyzylzhar)
11	MF	KAZ	Daniyar Usenov (on loan from (Kazakhstan) Kairat)
15	MF	GEO	Tsotne Mosiashvili (from (Georgia (country)) Dinamo Batumi)
77	GK	RUS	Arsen Siukayev (from (Kazakhstan) Aksu)
88	MF	BRA	Victor Braga (from (Kazakhstan) Ordabasy)
—	DF	BRA	Charleston (from (Kazakhstan) Maktaaral)

Out: Note: Flags indicate national team as defined under FIFA eligibility rules; some limited exceptions apply. Players may hold more than one non-FIFA nationality.

No.	Pos.	Nation	Player
7	MF	KAZ	Aslan Adil (to (Kazakhstan) Atyrau)
14	MF	KAZ	David Esimbekov (to (Russia) Chernomorets Novorossiysk)
18	FW	SRB	Anes Rušević (to (Romania) Oțelul Galați)
19	DF	BLR	Pavel Nazarenko (to (Belarus) Gomel)
24	MF	SRB	Nikola Cuckić (to (Kazakhstan) Turan)
25	MF	UKR	Ivan Brikner (to (Poland) Stomil Olsztyn)
