= 2025 FC Tobol season =

FC Tobol
2025 season
- Chairman: Nikolay Panin
- Manager: Nurbol Zhumaskaliyev
- Stadium: Central Stadium
- Premier League: 3rd
- Kazakhstan Cup: Champions
- Top goalscorer: League: Islam Chesnokov (9); All: Islam Chesnokov (10)
- Highest home attendance: 7,000 vs Kairat (26 July 2025); 7,000 vs Astana (19 September 2025)
- Lowest home attendance: 2,700 vs Yelimay (30 March 2025)
- Average home league attendance: 4,131 (28 September 2025)
Home colours	Away colours	Third colours

The 2025 FC Tobol season was the 27th successive season that the club played in the Kazakhstan Premier League, the highest tier of association football in Kazakhstan.

== Season events ==
On 30 December 2024, Tobol announced the signing of Nauryzbek Zhagorov from Atyrau.

On 1 January, Tobol announced the signing of Danil Ustimenko from Kairat.

On 6 January, Tobol announced the signing of Daniyar Usenov from Kairat.

On 10 January, Tobol announced the signing of Victor Braga from Debrecen.

On 17 January, Tobol announced the signing of Meyrambek Kalmyrza from Zhetysu.

On 24 January, Tobol announced the signing of Marko Vukčević from Borac Banja Luka.

On 12 July, Tobol announced the signing of Nemanja Cavnić from Željezničar.

On 16 July, Meyrambek Kalmyrza joined Okzhetpes on loan for the remainder of the season.

On 30 July, Tobol announced the signings of Yegor Khvalko from Kapaz, and Henrique Devens from Žalgiris.

On 28 August, Tobol announced the signing of Shokhboz Umarov from Turan.

== Squad ==
As of match played 26 October 2025

No.	Name	Nationality	Position	Date of birth (age)	Signed from	Signed in	Contract ends	Apps.	Goals
Goalkeepers
1	Sultan Busurmanov	(Kazakhstan)	GK	10 May 1996 (aged 29)	Academy	2015		49	0
21	David Mukhin	(Kazakhstan)	GK	17 October 2006 (aged 19)	Academy	2024		1	0
35	Yuri Melikhov	(Kazakhstan)	GK	1 September 2003 (aged 22)	Academy	2021		1	0
44	Danil Ustimenko	(Kazakhstan)	GK	8 August 2000 (aged 25)	Kairat	2025		15	0
Defenders
3	Roman Asrankulov	(Kazakhstan)	DF	30 July 1999 (aged 26)	Academy	2018		107	5
4	Nemanja Cavnić	(Montenegro)	DF	5 September 1995 (aged 30)	Željezničar Sarajevo	2025		11	1
5	Pape-Alioune Ndiaye	(France)	DF	4 February 1998 (aged 27)	Şanlıurfaspor	2024		54	1
15	Marko Vukčević	(Montenegro)	DF	7 June 1993 (aged 32)	Borac Banja Luka	2025		27	4
23	Temirlan Yerlanov	(Kazakhstan)	DF	9 July 1993 (aged 32)	Ordabasy	2025		29	1
33	Ivan Pivovarov	(Kazakhstan)	DF	4 March 2007 (aged 18)	Academy	2025		1	0
38	Amanzhol Bakitzhanov	(Kazakhstan)	DF	24 December 2007 (aged 17)	Academy	2025		4	0
55	Ivan Miladinović	(Serbia)	DF	14 August 1994 (aged 31)	Unattached	2024		43	1
78	Yegor Khvalko	(Belarus)	DF	18 February 1997 (aged 28)	Kapaz	2025		10	1
Midfielders
6	Ededem Essien	(Nigeria)	MF	14 April 1998 (aged 27)	Pari Nizhny Novgorod	2024		54	0
8	Beybit Galym	(Kazakhstan)	MF	25 October 2004 (aged 21)	Academy	2022		46	3
10	Ahmed El Messaoudi	(Morocco)	MF	3 August 1995 (aged 30)	Emmen	2024		57	15
11	Islam Chesnokov	(Kazakhstan)	MF	21 November 1999 (aged 25)	Belshina Bobruisk	2023		92	29
13	Tsotne Mosiashvili	(Georgia (country))	MF	14 February 1995 (aged 30)	Zhetysu	2024		35	0
16	Victor Braga	(Brazil)	MF	18 April 2001 (aged 24)	Debrecen	2025		29	1
17	Aleksandr Zuyev	(Kazakhstan)	MF	26 June 1996 (aged 29)	Arsenal Tula	2024		41	7
18	Askhat Tagybergen	(Kazakhstan)	MF	9 August 1990 (aged 35)	Ordabasy	2025		91	18
27	Nauryzbek Zhagorov	(Kazakhstan)	MF	1 March 1998 (aged 27)	Atyrau	2025		30	1
28	Elaman Ospangali	(Kazakhstan)	MF	27 April 2005 (aged 20)	Altai	2024		1	0
Forwards
7	Zhaslan Zhumashev	(Kazakhstan)	FW	27 September 2001 (aged 24)	Academy	2020		102	10
14	Nikolay Signevich	(Belarus)	FW	20 February 1992 (aged 33)	Atyrau	2025		18	9
70	Shokhboz Umarov	(Uzbekistan)	FW	9 March 1999 (aged 26)	Turan	2025		4	0
99	Henrique Devens	(Brazil)	FW	20 June 1997 (aged 28)	Žalgiris	2025		8	1
Players away on loan
19	Daniyar Usenov	(Kazakhstan)	MF	18 February 2001 (aged 24)	Kairat	2025		0	0
22	Meyrambek Kalmyrza	(Kazakhstan)	MF	15 December 2002 (aged 22)	Zhetysu	2025		7	0
Left during the season
45	Aldiyar Altayev	(Kazakhstan)	FW	30 November 2006 (aged 18)	Astana	2025		1	0
77	David Henen	(Togo)	FW	19 April 1996 (aged 29)	K.V. Kortrijk	2024		35	5

== Transfers ==
=== In ===
Date	Position	Nationality	Name	From	Fee	Ref.
30 December 2024	FW	(Kazakhstan)	Nauryzbek Zhagorov	Debrecen	Undisclosed	
1 January 2025	GK	(Kazakhstan)	Danil Ustimenko	Kairat	Undisclosed	
6 January 2025	MF	(Kazakhstan)	Daniyar Usenov	Kairat	Undisclosed	
10 January 2025	MF	(Brazil)	Victor Braga	Debrecen	Undisclosed	
17 January 2025	MF	(Kazakhstan)	Meyrambek Kalmyrza	Zhetysu	Undisclosed	
24 January 2025	FW	(Montenegro)	Marko Vukčević	Borac Banja Luka	Undisclosed	
12 July 2025	DF	(Montenegro)	Nemanja Cavnić	Željezničar	Undisclosed	
30 July 2025	DF	(Belarus)	Yegor Khvalko	Kapaz	Undisclosed	
30 July 2025	FW	(Brazil)	Henrique Devens	Žalgiris	Undisclosed	
28 August 2025	FW	(Uzbekistan)	Shokhboz Umarov	Turan	Undisclosed	

=== Loans out ===
Date from	Position	Nationality	Name	To	Date to	Ref.
16 July 2025	MF	(Kazakhstan)	Meyrambek Kalmyrza	Okzhetpes	End of season	

=== Released ===
Date	Position	Nationality	Name	Joined	Date	Ref.
21 January 2025	GK	(Russia)	Stas Pokatilov	Sabah	21 January 2025	
22 January 2025	DF	(Russia)	Albert Gabarayev	Fakel Voronezh		
30 January 2025	FW	(Portugal)	Rui Costa	Farense		
9 August 2025	FW	(Togo)	David Henen	SHB Da Nang		
31 December 2025	MF	(Kazakhstan)	Islam Chesnokov	Heart of Midlothian	6 January 2026	

== Friendlies ==
2025	–
(UTC+5)

== Competitions ==
Competition	First match	Last match	Starting round	Final position	Record							
Competition	First match	Last match	Starting round	Final position	Pld	W	D	L	GF	GA	GD	Win %
Premier League	1 March 2025	26 October 2025	Matchday 1	3rd	26	16	6	4	45	25	+20	61.54
Kazakhstan Cup	13 April 2025	4 October 2025	Round of 16	Winners	5	4	1	0	8	2	+6	80.00
Total					31	20	7	4	53	27	+26	64.52

Last updated: 26 October 2025
Source: Competitions

=== Premier League ===
==== Results summary ====
Overall								Home						Away					
Pld	W	D	L	GF	GA	GD	Pts	W	D	L	GF	GA	GD	W	D	L	GF	GA	GD
24	11	6	7	33	22	+11	39	8	2	2	18	8	+10	3	4	5	15	14	+1

Last updated: 26 October 2025.
Source: See Results

==== Results by round ====
Round	1	2	3	4	5	6	7	8	10	11	12	13	14	15	16	17	18	19	21	22	23	20	9	24	25	26
Ground	H	A	H	A	H	A	H	A	A	H	A	H	H	A	H	A	H	A	A	H	A	H	H	H	A	A
Result	W	D	D	W	W	L	W	W	W	W	D	W	D	W	W	D	L	W	W	W	L	L	W	W	W	D
Position																										

Source: See Results
A = Away; H = Home; W = Win; D = Draw; L = Loss; P = Bye

==== Results ====
1 March 2025 1	Tobol	2–0	Ulytau	Kostanay
18:00 (UTC+5)	Signevich 42'; Chesnokov 74'	Report	Keiler (yellow card) 45+2'	Stadium: Central Stadium; Attendance: 3,000; Referee: Denis Tevyashov

8 March 2025 2	Zhenis	0–0	Tobol	Astana
16:00 (UTC+5)	Kuat (yellow card) 85'; Nowak (yellow card) 87'	Report	Vukčević (yellow card) 40'; Braga (yellow card) 90+1'	Stadium: Astana Arena; Attendance: 6,565; Referee: Elvira Nurmustafina

30 March 2025 3	Tobol	1–1	Yelimay	Kostanay
18:00 (UTC+5)	Signevich 9' (yellow card) 67'	Report	Tyulyubay (yellow card) 67'	Stadium: Central Stadium; Attendance: 2,700; Referee: Ruslan Sultangaliev

5 April 2025 4	Okzhetpes	0–1	Tobol	Kokshetau
15:00 (UTC+5)	Darabayev (yellow card) 45+2'; Idrisov (yellow card) 48' (yellow-red card) 67'	Report	Essien (yellow card) 88'; Zuyev 90+3'	Stadium: Okzhetpes Stadium; Attendance: 3,500

19 April 2025 5	Tobol	2–0	Aktobe	Kostanay
19:00 (UTC+5)	Tagybergen (yellow card) 30'; Vukčević 45+1'; Chesnokov 78'	Report	Rabiu (yellow card) 30'; Doumbouya (yellow card) 43'; Agbo (yellow card) 65'; Jean (yellow card) 74'	Stadium: Central Stadium; Attendance: 3,000; Referee: Bagdat Abdullaev

27 April 2025 6	Kairat	2–1	Tobol	Almaty
17:00 (UTC+5)	Gromyko 4'; Zaria (penalty missed) 35'; Satpayev (yellow card) 45+2'; Jorginho 60'; Stanojev (yellow card) 90+4'	Report	Essien (yellow card) 32'; Vukčević (yellow card) 66'; Zuyev 79'	Stadium: Central Stadium; Attendance: 9,754; Referee: Anton Kuchma

4 May 2025 7	Tobol	2–1	Kyzylzhar	Kostanay
19:00 (UTC+5)	Signevich 27'; Ndiaye (yellow card) 32'; Chesnokov (yellow card) 42'; Braga 89'; Ustimenko (yellow card) 90+2'	Report	Buranchiev (yellow card) 31'; Zorić 43'; Gorshunov (yellow card) 57'; Sabino (yellow card) 75'	Stadium: Central Stadium; Attendance: 2,800; Referee: Artem Kuchin

10 May 2025 8	Astana	1–3	Tobol	Astana
19:00 (UTC+5)	Ebong (yellow card) 67'; Chinedu 86'	Report	El Messaoudi 8'; Signevich 16', 37'; Ndiaye (yellow card) 34'; Braga (yellow card) 48'	Stadium: Astana Arena; Attendance: 7,200; Referee: Daniyar Sakhi

25 May 2025 10	Turan	1–2	Tobol	Turkistan
20:00 (UTC+5)	Mukhtorov (yellow card) 6'; Duysenbekuly 83'	Report	Braga (yellow card) 15'; Chesnokov 36'; Asrankulov (yellow card) 62'; Henen (yellow card) 64'; Zuyev 74'	Stadium: Turkistan Arena; Attendance: 700; Referee: Saken Bayymbet

30 May 2025 11	Tobol	5–0	Atyrau	Kostanay
18:30 (UTC+5)	Zuyev 14'; Chesnokov 16'; El Messaoudi 42'; Braga (yellow card) 50'; Asrankulov 78'; Zhumashev 86'	Report	Gadrani (red card) 23'; Tsitskishvili (yellow card) 34'; Oralbay (yellow card) 61'	Stadium: Central Stadium; Attendance: 4,500; Referee: Sergey Nozhenko

15 June 2025 12	Kaisar	1–1	Tobol	Kyzylorda
20:00 (UTC+5)	Zhalmukan 38'; Abiken (yellow card) 75'	Report	Vukčević 18'	Stadium: Gani Muratbayev Stadium; Attendance: 3,500; Referee: Arman Ismuratov

21 June 2025 13	Tobol	2–1	Zhetysu	Kostanay
20:00 (UTC+5)	Zhumashev 19'; Vukčević (yellow card) 66'; Chesnokov 72'	Report	Esimbekov (yellow card) 61'; Bolov 81'	Stadium: Central Stadium; Attendance: 4,000; Referee: Denis Tevyashov

29 June 2025 14	Tobol	2–2	Zhenis	Kostanay
18:00 (UTC+5)	Asrankulov (yellow card) 26'; Signevich 41'; Essien (yellow card) 67'; Chesnokov 76' (pen.); Miladinović (yellow card) FT	Report	Adílio 15'; Adil 32'; Saulet (yellow card) 51'; Kuat (yellow card) 76' (red card) FT; Šaravanja (yellow card) 90+1'; Anuarbekov (yellow card) FT	Stadium: Central Stadium; Attendance: 3,500; Referee: Ruslan Sultangaliev

5 July 2025 15	Yelimay	2–3	Tobol	Semey
20:00 (UTC+5)	Koval (yellow card) 45+1'; Rolón (yellow card) 45+2'; Muzhikov (penalty missed) 50'; Murtazayev (yellow card) 54' (goal) 59'; Sviridov 63'; Payruz (yellow card) 90'; Maicom (yellow card) 90+5'	Report	Vukčević 13'; Zuyev (yellow card) 20'; El Messaoudi 45'; Chesnokov 70'; Ndiaye (yellow card) 71'; Miladinović (yellow card) 86'	Stadium: Spartak Stadium; Attendance: 7,000; Referee: Georgy Chekhovsky

13 July 2025 16	Tobol	2–1	Okzhetpes	Kostanay
18:00 (UTC+5)	Chesnokov (yellow card) 39'; Zhumashev 64', 72'	Report	Zhumat 43'; Marat (yellow card) 55'; Cuckić (yellow card) 80'; Ashirbek (yellow card) 89'	Stadium: Central Stadium; Attendance: 4,200; Referee: Saken Bayimbet

20 July 2025 17	Aktobe	0–0	Tobol	Aktobe
20:00 (UTC+5)	Vlad (yellow card) 23'; Kairov (yellow card) 25'; Jean (yellow card) 45+2'; Seydakhmet (yellow card) 84'	Report	Signevich (yellow card) 23'; Chesnokov (yellow card) 25'; Asrankulov (yellow card) 66'; Vukčević (yellow card) 83'; Galym (yellow card) 90+4'	Stadium: Central Stadium; Attendance: 12,000; Referee: Bolat Sariev

26 July 2025 18	Tobol	1–3	Kairat	Kostanay
18:00 (UTC+5)	Essien (yellow card) 55' (yellow-red card) 78'; Cavnić (yellow card) 64'; El Messaoudi 76' (pen.); Ndiaye (yellow card) 85'	Report	Jorginho 45+1'; Shirobokov (yellow card) 67'; Gromyko 68'; Kasabulat (yellow card) 83'; Ricardinho 89'; Zaria (yellow card) 90+3'	Stadium: Central Stadium; Attendance: 7,000; Referee: Daniyar Sakhi

2 August 2025 19	Kyzylzhar	0–2	Tobol	Petropavl
18:00 (UTC+5)	Buranchiev (yellow card) 13'; Sebai (yellow card) 48' (yellow-red card) 85'	Report	Cavnić 18'; Zhumashev (yellow card) 31'; Galym 83'	Stadium: Karasai Stadium; Attendance: 2,500; Referee: Sayat Karabaev

17 August 2025 21	Ordabasy	2–3	Tobol	Shymkent
20:00 (UTC+5)	Everton 54'; Zhaksybaev (yellow card) 58'; Vakulko (yellow card) 64'; Malyi (yellow card) 66'; Dias (yellow card) 73'; E.Astanov 82' (pen.); Čanađija (yellow card) 87'; Amir (yellow card) 90+2'	Report	El Messaoudi 14', 32'; Tagybergen 40' (yellow card) 78'; Chesnokov (yellow card) 45'; Braga (yellow card) 90+6'; Busurmanov (yellow card) 90+8'	Stadium: Kazhymukan Munaitpasov Stadium; Attendance: 5,000; Referee: Denis Tevyashov

23 August 2025 22	Tobol	2–0	Turan	Kostanay
18:00 (UTC+5)	Tagybergen 4'; Zuyev (yellow card) 62' (goal) 72'; Braga (yellow card) 76'; Bakitzhanov (penalty missed) 90+3	Report	Čermelj (yellow card) 23'; Trifunovic (yellow card) 49'	Stadium: Central Stadium; Attendance: 4,000; Referee: Sayat Sulikanov

13 September 2025 23	Atyrau	1–0	Tobol	Atyrau
17:00 (UTC+5)	Dzhumatov (yellow card) 49'; Trufanov 66'	Report	Zuyev (yellow card) 8'; El Messaoudi (yellow card) 15'; Chesnokov (yellow card) 73'	Stadium: Munaishy Stadium; Attendance: 4,000; Referee: Marat Iskakov

19 September 2025 20	Tobol	2–3	Astana	Kostanay
19:00 (UTC+5)	Chesnokov 2'; El Messaoudi 34' (pen.); Tagybergen (red card) 37'; Zuyev (yellow card) 90+7'	Report	Tomasov 6', 90+1'; Marochkin (yellow card) 11'; Chinedu 45+2'	Stadium: Central Stadium; Attendance: 7,000; Referee: Bulat Sariev

24 September 2025 9	Tobol	1–0	Ordabasy	Kostanay
19:00 (UTC+5)	Chesnokov 14' (pen.); Ndiaye (yellow card) 66'	Report	Everton (yellow card) 3'; S.Astanov (yellow card) 17'; Antić (yellow card) 37'; Zhaksybaev (yellow card) 90+7'	Stadium: Central Stadium; Attendance: 4,000; Referee: Arman Ismuratov
Note: Match originally scheduled for 18 May, but postponed on 17 May after Ordabasy's flight to Kostanay was cancelled due to bad weather.

28 September 2025 24	Tobol	1–0	Kaisar	Kostanay
18:00 (UTC+5)	Essien (yellow card) 25'; Chesnokov (yellow card) 80'; Signevich 90+6'	Report	Abiken (yellow card) 35'; Makhan (yellow card) 80'; Kenesbek (yellow card) 90+2'	Stadium: Central Stadium; Attendance: 4,000; Referee: Denis Tevyashov

19 October 2025 25	Zhetysu	1–2	Tobol	Kyzylorda
15:00 (UTC+5)	Takulov 4'; Karwot (yellow card) 8'; Omatay (yellow card) 77'; Schmidt (yellow card) 81'	Report	Vukčević 55'; Signevich 66'	Stadium: Gani Muratbayev Stadium; Attendance: 2,500; Referee: Sayat Karabaev

26 October 2025 26	Ulytau	2–2	Tobol	Jezkazgan
15:00 (UTC+5)	Pajovic 39'; Vachiberadze 79'	Report	Devens 33'; Umarov (yellow card) 65'; Galym 84' (yellow card) 86'	Stadium: Metallurg Stadium; Attendance: 2,000; Referee: Danil Gorda

==== League table ====
Pos	Team	Pld	W	D	L	GF	GA	GD	Pts	Qualification or relegation
1	Kairat (C)	26	18	5	3	53	19	+34	59	Qualification for the Champions League first qualifying round
2	Astana	26	17	6	3	66	30	+36	57	Qualification for the Conference League first qualifying round
3	Tobol	26	16	6	4	45	25	+20	54	Qualification for the Conference League second qualifying round (Note: Since the winners of the 2025 Kazakhstan Cup, Tobol, finished in the top three of the Premier League, the remaining Conference League first qualifying round spot was passed to the fourth-placed team.)
4	Elimai	26	14	6	6	47	31	+16	48	Qualification for the Conference League first qualifying round
5	Aktobe	26	13	4	9	39	29	+10	43	

Source: UEFA, Soccerway
Rules for classification: 1) Points; 2) Goal difference; 3) Matches won; 4) Goals scored; 5) Away goals scored; 6) Head-to-head points; 7) Head-to-head matches won; 8) Head-to-head goal difference; 9) Head-to-head goals scored; 10) Head-to-head away goals scored; 11) Draw.
(C) Champions

=== Kazakhstan Cup ===
13 April 2025 Round of 16	Tobol	1–0	Zhetysu	Kostanay
19:00 (UTC+5)	Essien (yellow card) 40'; Chesnokov (yellow card) 90'; Zhumashev 116'; Asrankulov (yellow card) 118'; Galym (yellow card) 120+1'	Report	Nurbergen (yellow card) 56'; Schmidt (yellow card) 90'; Takulov (yellow card) 120+1'	Stadium: Central Stadium; Attendance: 2,000; Referee: Anton Kuchma

14 May 2025 Quarterfinal	Turan	0–2	Tobol	Turkistan
20:00 (UTC+5)	Abdumajidov (yellow card) 50'; Milojko (yellow card) 53'	Report	Miladinović (yellow card) 44' (goal) 77'; Henen (yellow card) 56' (goal) 60'; Zhumashev (yellow card) 62'; Chesnokov (yellow card) 75'	Stadium: Turkistan Arena; Attendance: 3,000; Referee: Georgy Chekhovsky

25 June 2025 Semifinal 1st leg	Tobol	2–1	Zhenis	Kostanay
20:00 (UTC+5)	Zuyev 6'; Ndiaye (yellow card) 27'; Miladinović (yellow card) 35'; Zhagorov 73'; Asrankulov (yellow card) 90+2'	Report	Adílio 27'; Sovet (yellow card) 40'; Adil (yellow card) 52'; Kuat (yellow card) 81'	Stadium: Central Stadium; Attendance: 6,500; Referee: Bolat Sariev

29 August 2025 Semifinal 2nd leg	Zhenis	1–1 (2–3 agg.)	Tobol	Astana
19:00 (UTC+5)	Kuat 65'; Saulet (yellow card) 90+3'	Report	Tagybergen (yellow card) 29'; Khvalko (yellow card) 79' (goal) 87'; Chesnokov (yellow card) 89'	Stadium: Astana Arena; Attendance: 4,300; Referee: Daniyar Sakhi

4 October 2025 Final	Ordabasy	0–2	Tobol	Kyzylorda
21:00 (UTC+5)	Imnadze (yellow card) 49'; E.Astanov (yellow card) 90+1'; Vakulko (yellow card) 90+4'	Report	Signevich 19'; Chesnokov 33'; Mosiashvili (yellow card) 90+1'	Stadium: Gani Muratbayev Stadium; Attendance: 11,000; Referee: Sven Wolfensberger

== Squad statistics ==
As of match played 26 October 2025

=== Appearances and goals ===
No.	Pos	Nat	Player	Total		Premier League		Kazakhstan Cup	
No.	Pos	Nat	Player	Apps	Goals	Apps	Goals	Apps	Goals
1	GK	(Kazakhstan) KAZ	Sultan Busurmanov	15	0	10	0	5	0
3	DF	(Kazakhstan) KAZ	Roman Asrankulov	18	1	14+1	1	0+3	0
4	DF	(Montenegro) MNE	Nemanja Cavnić	11	1	8+1	1	2	0
5	DF	(France) FRA	Pape-Alioune Ndiaye	23	0	18	0	5	0
6	MF	(Nigeria) NGR	Ededem Essien	24	0	16+4	0	3+1	0
7	FW	(Kazakhstan) KAZ	Zhaslan Zhumashev	23	5	10+9	4	3+1	1
8	MF	(Kazakhstan) KAZ	Beybit Galym	11	2	1+9	2	0+1	0
10	MF	(Morocco) MAR	Ahmed El Messaoudi	25	7	18+3	7	4	0
11	MF	(Kazakhstan) KAZ	Islam Chesnokov	28	10	24	9	3+1	1
13	MF	(Georgia (country)) GEO	Tsotne Mosiashvili	19	0	6+8	0	2+3	0
14	FW	(Belarus) BLR	Nikolay Signevich	18	9	14+2	8	2	1
15	DF	(Montenegro) MNE	Marko Vukčević	27	4	21+2	4	4	0
16	MF	(Brazil) BRA	Victor Braga	29	1	13+11	1	2+3	0
17	MF	(Kazakhstan) KAZ	Aleksandr Zuyev	28	6	13+10	5	3+2	1
18	MF	(Kazakhstan) KAZ	Askhat Tagybergen	26	2	20+1	2	3+2	0
23	DF	(Kazakhstan) KAZ	Temirlan Yerlanov	12	0	9+2	0	1	0
27	MF	(Kazakhstan) KAZ	Nauryzbek Zhagorov	30	1	20+5	0	5	1
28	MF	(Kazakhstan) KAZ	Elaman Ospangali	1	0	0+1	0	0	0
33	DF	(Kazakhstan) KAZ	Ivan Pivovarov	1	0	1	0	0	0
35	GK	(Kazakhstan) KAZ	Yuri Melikhov	1	0	1	0	0	0
38	DF	(Kazakhstan) KAZ	Amanzhol Bakitzhanov	4	0	0+4	0	0	0
44	GK	(Kazakhstan) KAZ	Danil Ustimenko	15	0	15	0	0	0
55	DF	(Serbia) SRB	Ivan Miladinović	16	1	13	0	3	1
70	FW	(Uzbekistan) UZB	Shokhboz Umarov	4	0	0+4	0	0	0
78	DF	(Belarus) BLR	Yegor Khvalko	10	1	7+1	0	2	1
99	FW	(Brazil) BRA	Henrique Devens	8	1	3+4	1	0+1	0
Players away from Tobol on loan:
22	MF	(Kazakhstan) KAZ	Meyrambek Kalmyrza	7	0	0+4	0	1+2	0
Players who left Tobol during the season:
45	FW	(Kazakhstan) KAZ	Aldiyar Altayev	1	0	0+1	0	0	0
77	FW	(Togo) TOG	David Henen	11	1	2+6	0	2+1	1

=== Goal scorers ===
Place	Position	Nation	Number	Name	Premier League	Kazakhstan Cup	Total
1	MF	(Kazakhstan)	11	Islam Chesnokov	9	1	10
2	FW	(Belarus)	14	Nikolay Signevich	8	1	9
3	MF	(Morocco)	10	Ahmed El Messaoudi	7	0	7
4	MF	(Kazakhstan)	17	Aleksandr Zuyev	5	1	6
5	FW	(Kazakhstan)	7	Zhaslan Zhumashev	4	1	5
6	DF	(Montenegro)	15	Marko Vukčević	4	0	4
7	MF	(Kazakhstan)	18	Askhat Tagybergen	2	0	2
7	MF	(Kazakhstan)	8	Beybit Galym	2	0	2
9	MF	(Brazil)	16	Victor Braga	1	0	1
9	DF	(Kazakhstan)	3	Roman Asrankulov	1	0	1
9	DF	(Montenegro)	4	Nemanja Cavnić	1	0	1
9	FW	(Brazil)	99	Henrique Devens	1	0	1
9	DF	(Serbia)	55	Ivan Miladinović	0	1	1
9	FW	(Togo)	77	David Henen	0	1	1
9	MF	(Kazakhstan)	27	Nauryzbek Zhagorov	0	1	1
9	DF	(Belarus)	78	Yegor Khvalko	0	1	1
				TOTALS	45	8	53

=== Clean sheets ===
Place	Position	Nation	Number	Name	Premier League	Kazakhstan Cup	Total
1	GK	(Kazakhstan)	44	Danil Ustimenko	7	0	7
2	GK	(Kazakhstan)	1	Sultan Busurmanov	3	3	6
				TOTALS	10	3	13

=== Disciplinary record ===
Number	Nation	Position	Name	Premier League		Kazakhstan Cup		Total	
Number	Nation	Position	Name	Booked	Sent off (straight red)	Booked	Sent off (straight red)	(yellow card) 0	Sent off (straight red)
1	(Kazakhstan)	GK	Sultan Busurmanov	1	0	0	0	1	0
3	(Kazakhstan)	DF	Roman Asrankulov	3	0	2	0	5	0
4	(Montenegro)	DF	Nemanja Cavnić	1	0	0	0	1	0
5	(France)	DF	Pape-Alioune Ndiaye	5	0	1	0	6	0
6	(Nigeria)	MF	Ededem Essien	6	1	1	0	7	1
7	(Kazakhstan)	FW	Zhaslan Zhumashev	1	0	1	0	2	0
8	(Kazakhstan)	MF	Beybit Galym	2	0	1	0	3	0
10	(Morocco)	MF	Ahmed El Messaoudi	1	0	0	0	1	0
11	(Kazakhstan)	MF	Islam Chesnokov	6	0	3	0	9	0
13	(Georgia (country))	MF	Tsotne Mosiashvili	0	0	1	0	1	0
14	(Belarus)	FW	Nikolay Signevich	2	0	0	0	2	0
15	(Montenegro)	DF	Marko Vukčević	4	0	0	0	4	0
16	(Brazil)	MF	Victor Braga	6	0	0	0	6	0
17	(Kazakhstan)	MF	Aleksandr Zuyev	4	0	0	0	4	0
18	(Kazakhstan)	MF	Askhat Tagybergen	2	1	1	0	3	1
44	(Kazakhstan)	GK	Danil Ustimenko	1	0	0	0	1	0
55	(Serbia)	DF	Ivan Miladinović	2	0	2	0	4	0
70	(Uzbekistan)	FW	Shokhboz Umarov	1	0	0	0	1	0
78	(Belarus)	DF	Yegor Khvalko	0	0	1	0	1	0
Players away from Tobol on loan:
77	(Togo)	FW	David Henen	1	0	1	0	2	0
Players who left Tobol during the season:
			TOTALS	49	2	15	0	64	2
