= 2024 Kazakhstan Super Cup =

| Ordabasy | Tobol |
| 1 | 1 |
- Tobol won 5–4 on penalties
- Date: 25 February 2024
- Venue: Mardan Sports Complex, Aksu
- Referee: Bulat Sariev
- Attendance: 6,000

The 2024 Kazakhstan Super Cup was the 17th Kazakhstan Super Cup, an annual football match played between the winners of the previous season's Premier League, Ordabasy, and the winners of the previous season's Kazakhstan Cup, Tobol. The match was played on 25 February 2024, at the Mardan Sports Complex in Aksu, Turkey, with Tobol winning their third title, defeating Ordabasy 5–4 in a penalty shootout after the match initially finished 1-1.

== Background ==
On 10 February, it was announced that the Super Cup would be played at the Mardan Sports Complex in Aksu, Turkey.

== Match details ==
25 February 2024
18:00 UTC+06:00

| Ordabasy | 1 – 1 (a.e.t.) | Tobol |
|---|---|---|
| Makarenko 45' | Report | Miladinović 63' |
Penalties
| Makarenko (penalty scored); Fedin (penalty scored); Reginaldo (penalty missed); Sadovsky (penalty scored); Tursynbay (penalty scored); Tungyshbayev (penalty missed) | 4 – 5 | (penalty scored) El Messaoudi; (penalty missed) Ivanović; (penalty scored) Asrankulov; (penalty scored) Ndiaye; (penalty scored) Chesnokov; (penalty scored) Cooper |

Mardan Sports Complex, Aksu
Attendance: 6,000
Referee: Bulat Sariev

| Ordabasy | Tobol |

| GK | 1 | (Kazakhstan) Bekkhan Shayzada |
| DF | 2 | (Brazil) Reginaldo |
| DF | 17 | (Serbia) Zlatan Šehović | | (substituted off) 87' |
| DF | 23 | (Kazakhstan) Temirlan Yerlanov |
| DF | 25 | (Kazakhstan) Serhiy Malyi | (yellow card) 15' |
| DF | 32 | (Ukraine) Ihor Plastun | | (substituted off) 46' |
| MF | 4 | (Croatia) Lovro Cvek |
| MF | 7 | (Uzbekistan) Shokhboz Umarov | | (substituted off) 67' |
| MF | 8 | (Kazakhstan) Askhat Tagybergen | | (substituted off) 81' |
| MF | 19 | (Ukraine) Yevhen Makarenko | (yellow card) 88' |
| FW | 10 | (Uzbekistan) Jasurbek Yakhshiboev | | (substituted off) 67' |
Substitutes:
| GK | 12 | (Croatia) Karlo Sentić |
| DF | 5 | (Kazakhstan) Gafurzhan Suyumbayev |
| MF | 11 | (Kazakhstan) Maksim Fedin | | (substituted on) 81' |
| DF | 13 | (Kazakhstan) Sagadat Tursynbay | | (substituted on) 46' |
| MF | 18 | (Kazakhstan) Murodzhon Khalmatov |
| FW | 20 | (Kazakhstan) Batyrkhan Tazhibay |
| MF | 21 | (Kazakhstan) Yerkebulan Tungyshbayev | | (substituted on) 67' |
| FW | 30 | (Belarus) Vsevolod Sadovsky | (yellow card) 89' | (substituted on) 67' |
| FW | 41 | (Ukraine) Artem Byesyedin |
| MF | 47 | (Kazakhstan) Vladislav Vasilyev | | (substituted on) 87' |
| MF | 77 | (Kazakhstan) Zikrillo Sultaniyazov |
Manager:
(Belarus) Aleksandr Sednyov

| GK | 1 | (Kazakhstan) Stas Pokatilov |
| DF | 3 | (Kazakhstan) Roman Asrankulov |
| DF | 5 | (France) Pape-Alioune Ndiaye |
| DF | 15 | (Russia) Albert Gabarayev | (yellow card) 57' | (substituted off) 61' |
| DF | 55 | (Serbia) Ivan Miladinović |
| MF | 6 | (Nigeria) Ededem Essien |
| MF | 8 | (Morocco) Ahmed El Messaoudi |
| MF | 10 | (Serbia) Igor Ivanović |
| MF | 11 | (Kazakhstan) Islam Chesnokov |
| MF | 28 | (Ukraine) Yevhen Shakhov |
| FW | 77 | (Togo) David Henen | | (substituted off) 61' |
Substitutes:
| GK | 12 | (Kazakhstan) Sultan Busurmanov |
| GK | 35 | (Kazakhstan) Yuri Melikhov |
| DF | 4 | (Kazakhstan) Ermek Abdulla |
| FW | 7 | (Kazakhstan) Zhaslan Zhumashev |
| MF | 16 | (Kazakhstan) Yerkin Tapalov | | (substituted on) 61' |
| MF | 19 | (Kazakhstan) Ruslan Valiullin |
| MF | 21 | (Bulgaria) Radoslav Tsonev |
| MF | 23 | (Kazakhstan) Nurgaini Buribaev |
| MF | 51 | (Kazakhstan) Beybit Galym |
| DF | 66 | (Kosovo) David Domgjoni |
| FW | 90 | (Italy) Godberg Cooper | | (substituted on) 61' |
Manager:
(Serbia) Milić Ćurčić

== See also ==
- 2023 Kazakhstan Premier League
- 2023 Kazakhstan Cup
