= Islam Chesnokov =

Kazakhstani footballer

Personal information
- Full name: Islam Khusiyevich Chesnokov
- Date of birth: 21 November 1999 (age 26)
- Place of birth: Oskemen, Kazakhstan
- Height: 1.85 m (6 ft 1 in)
- Position: Right winger

Team information
- Current team: Krylia Sovetov (on loan from Tobol)
- Number: 17

Youth career
- 2015–2019: Altai Semey

Senior career*
Years	Team	Apps	(Gls)
2018–2021	Altai Semey	15	(1)
2021–2022	Belshina Bobruisk	55	(10)
2023–2025	Tobol	68	(24)
2025–2026	Heart of Midlothian	10	(1)
2026–	Tobol	7	(0)
2026–	→ Krylia Sovetov (loan)	8	(0)

International career^{‡}
2023–	Kazakhstan	28	(4)
- * Club domestic league appearances and goals as of 20 November 2026 ‡ National team caps and goals as of 16:57, 16 November 2026 (UTC)

Islam Khusiyevich Chesnokov (Russian: Ислам Хусиевич Чесноков; born 21 November 1999) is a Kazakhstani professional footballer who plays as a right winger for Russian Premier League club Krylia Sovetov, on loan from Kazakhstan Premier League side FC Tobol, and the Kazakhstan national team.

He previously played for Heart of Midlothian, Belshina Bobruisk, and as a youth player for Altai-M Semey.

== Club career ==
On 4 February 2023, Chesnokov joined Tobol in his home country on a permanent transfer from Belshina Bobruisk. In November 2023, Chesnokov scored the only goal in the Kazakhstan Cup final for Tobol against Ordabasy.

In June 2025, he signed a pre contract agreement to join Scottish Premiership side Heart of Midlothian (Hearts) on expiration of his contract with Tobol on 31 December 2025. Hearts had previously tried to sign the winger in January 2025, but could not agree a fee. On 6 January 2026, Hearts confirmed his arrival on a deal until the summer of 2028. On 28 June 2026, Hearts confirmed that he would return to FC Tobol, following just 11 appearances at the club.

On 18 August 2026, Tobol announced that Chesnokov joined Krylia Sovetov on a year-long loan, with the option to make the move permanent.

== International career ==
Chesnokov scored his first and second international goals for Kazakhstan during a 3–1 win against San Marino on 17 November 2023 during UEFA Euro 2024 qualifying.

== Career statistics ==
=== Club ===
As of match played 20 November 2026

Appearances and goals by club, season and competition
Club	Season	League			National cup (Note: Includes Belarusian Cup, Kazakhstan Cup)		Europe		Other		Total	
Club	Season	Division	Apps	Goals	Apps	Goals	Apps	Goals	Apps	Goals	Apps	Goals
Altai	2020	Kazakhstan Premier League	11	1	0	0	–		–		11	1
Belshina Bobruisk	2021	Belarusian First League	28	7	2	0	–		–		30	7
Belshina Bobruisk	2022	Belarusian First League	27	3	2	0	–		–		29	3
Belshina Bobruisk	Total		55	10	4	0	0	0	0	0	59	10
Tobol	2023	Kazakhstan Premier League	22	5	6	2	6 (Note: Appearances in UEFA Conference League)	1	–		34	8
Tobol	2024	Kazakhstan Premier League	21	10	3	1	4 (Note: Two appearances in UEFA Europa League, two appearances in UEFA Conference League)	0	1 (Note: Appearance in Kazakhstan Super Cup)	0	29	11
Tobol	2025	Kazakhstan Premier League	25	9	4	1	–		–		29	10
Tobol	Total		68	24	13	4	10	1	1	0	92	29
Heart of Midlothian	2025–26	Scottish Premiership	10	1	1	0	0	0	–		11	1
Tobol	2026	Kazakhstan Premier League	7	0	0	0	4	1	0	0	11	1
Krylia Sovetov (loan)	2026–27	Russian Premier League	8	0	1	0	–		–		9	0
Career total			159	36	19	4	14	2	1	0	193	42

=== International ===
No.	Date	Venue	Opponent	Score	Result	Competition
1.	17 November 2023	Astana Arena, Astana, Kazakhstan	San Marino	1–0	3–1	UEFA Euro 2024 qualifying
2.	17 November 2023	Astana Arena, Astana, Kazakhstan	San Marino	2–0	3–1	UEFA Euro 2024 qualifying
3.	13 November 2026	Stadionul Zimbru, Chișinău, Moldova	Moldova	1–1	1–2	2026–27 UEFA Nations League C
4.	16 November 2026	Astana Arena, Astana, Kazakhstan	Slovakia	1–0	2–2	2026–27 UEFA Nations League C

== Honours ==
FC Tobol

- Kazakhstan Cup: 2023, 2025
- Kazakhstan Super Cup: 2024

Kazakhstan

- FIFA Series: 2026

Individual

- Kazakhstan Premier League Top Scorer: 2024
- FIFA Series Player of the Tournament: 2026
