= Rui Costa (footballer, born 1996) =

Portuguese footballer

Personal information
- Full name: Rui Pedro Silva Costa
- Date of birth: 20 February 1996 (age 30)
- Place of birth: Famalicão, Portugal
- Height: 1.79 m (5 ft 10 1/2 in)
- Position: Forward

Team information
- Current team: Port
- Number: 19

Youth career
- 2005–2013: Famalicão
- 2013–2014: Vitória Guimarães
- 2014–2015: Varzim

Senior career*
Years	Team	Apps	(Gls)
2015–2016	Varzim B	43	(8)
2016–2017	Varzim	41	(14)
2017–2018	Portimonense	1	(0)
2017–2018	→ Famalicão (loan)	17	(10)
2018–2020	Porto B	20	(3)
2019–2020	→ Alcorcón (loan)	22	(3)
2020–2021	Deportivo La Coruña	7	(0)
2021–2022	Santa Clara	49	(9)
2022–2024	Farense	50	(12)
2024	Tobol	12	(4)
2025–2026	Farense	40	(5)
2026–	Port	1	(0)
- * Club domestic league appearances and goals as of 17:20, 28 October 2026 (UTC)

Rui Pedro Silva Costa (born 20 February 1996) is a Portuguese professional footballer who plays as a forward for Thai League 1 club Port.

== Club career ==
=== Varzim ===
Born in Vila Nova de Famalicão, Braga District, Costa played youth football for three clubs, including local F.C. Famalicão from ages 9 to 17. He made his senior debut in February 2015, with Varzim SC's reserves.

Promoted to the latter's first team for the 2016–17 season in the Segunda Liga, Costa's first match in the competition took place on 6 August 2016, when he played 62 minutes in a 1–0 away loss against Gil Vicente FC. He went on to score 14 goals, helping his team to the ninth position and being voted Best Newcomer of the Year in that level.

=== Portimonense ===
Costa was loaned by Primeira Liga side Portimonense S.C. to Famalicão in August 2017. In October/November of that year, he netted three consecutive braces in the league in as many wins.

In January 2018, Costa had everything arranged to join FC Porto B. However, after it was discovered that he had been registered by Varzim five days prior to signing with Portimonense – thus representing three clubs in the same season – the move was declared void. He made his debut in the Portuguese top flight on 31 March, coming on as a 75th-minute substitute in a 4–3 home victory over Moreirense FC.

=== Porto and Deportivo ===
In July 2018, Costa was finally made a part of Porto B's setup. A year later, he moved abroad for the first time in his career after agreeing to a one-year loan deal with AD Alcorcón in the Spanish Segunda División. He continued in the country in September 2020, signing a two-year contract with Deportivo de La Coruña who had just been relegated from the same league; Porto remained entitled to 50% of any future transfer.

=== Santa Clara ===
Costa joined C.D. Santa Clara on a two-and-a-half-year deal on 1 February 2021. He scored his first top-tier goal on 5 March to equalise in a 2–1 loss at eventual champions Sporting CP, and netted two more in a 5–1 home defeat of C.D. Nacional on 11 April, as the Azorean club finished a best-ever sixth and qualified for the UEFA Europa Conference League.

On 12 August 2021, Costa scored the only goal as Santa Clara won away at NK Olimpija Ljubljana in the second leg of their European third qualifying round. The following 26 January, in the team's first-ever Taça da Liga semi-final, he was sent off for handball, conceding a penalty kick from which Pablo Sarabia scored in Sporting's 2–1 victory in Leiria.

=== Later career ===
Costa moved to second-tier S.C. Farense on 1 September 2022. Even though mainly a substitute, he scored nine times in his debut campaign, helping to promotion as runners-up.

On 27 June 2024, Costa signed for Kazakhstan Premier League side FC Tobol. In the following transfer window, he returned to his previous club on a contract until June 2026.
