= Sergey Volkov (footballer, born 1999) =

Belarusian footballer

Personal information
- Full name: Sergey Aleksandrovich Volkov
- Date of birth: 27 January 1999 (age 27)
- Place of birth: Polotsk, Vitebsk Oblast, Belarus
- Height: 1.83 m (6 ft 0 in)
- Position: Midfielder

Team information
- Current team: Isloch
- Number: 5

Youth career
- 2016–2017: Vitebsk

Senior career*
Years	Team	Apps	(Gls)
2017–2020	Vitebsk	45	(3)
2017	→ Orsha (loan)	5	(0)
2021–2023	BATE Borisov	35	(1)
2022	→ Vitebsk (loan)	28	(0)
2024	Zhenis	22	(0)
2025	Kuban Krasnodar	16	(0)
2025–	Isloch	18	(1)

International career^{‡}
2019–2020	Belarus U21	8	(0)
2020	Belarus	1	(0)
- * Club domestic league appearances and goals as of 3 July 2026 ‡ National team caps and goals as of 15 November 2020

Sergey Aleksandrovich Volkov (Belarusian: Сяргей Аляксандравіч Волкаў; Russian: Сергей Александрович Волков; born 27 January 1999) is a Belarusian professional footballer who plays as a midfielder for Belarusian Premier League club Isloch.

== Career ==
=== Club ===
On 15 July 2020 Volkov signed a contract with BATE Borisov, which will become effective on 1 January 2021, allowing the player to finish 2020 season in Vitebsk.

=== International ===
Volkov earned his first cap for the national team of his country on 26 February 2020, coming on as a substitute in the 1:0 away win over Bulgaria in a friendly match.

== Honours ==
BATE Borisov

- Belarusian Cup winner: 2020–21
