= Yerkin Tapalov =

Kazakhstani footballer

Personal information
- Full name: Yerkin Oleguly Tapalov
- Date of birth: 3 September 1993 (age 33)
- Place of birth: Oral, Kazakhstan
- Height: 1.80 m (5 ft 11 in)
- Position: Midfielder

Team information
- Current team: Kairat
- Number: 20

Senior career*
Years	Team	Apps	(Gls)
2011–2018	Akzhayik	113	(1)
2019–2020	Zhetysu	21	(0)
2020	Caspiy	2	(0)
2020–2021	Shakhter Karagandy	12	(1)
2021–2022	Akzhayik	25	(2)
2022	Turan	9	(0)
2022–2023	Kyzylzhar	36	(0)
2024	Tobol	19	(2)
2025–	Kairat	39	(1)

International career^{‡}
2019–	Kazakhstan	27	(0)
- * Club domestic league appearances and goals as of 1 November 2026 ‡ National team caps and goals as of 18 November 2026

Yerkin Oleguly Tapalov (Kazakh: Еркін Олегұлы Тапалов, romanized: Erkın Olegūly Tapalov; born 3 September 1993) is a Kazakh footballer who plays as a midfielder for Kairat and the Kazakhstan national team.

== Career ==
Tapalov made his professional debut with Akzhayik in a 4–1 Kazakhstan Cup loss to FC Taraz on 20 April 2011.

== International career ==
Tapalov made his international debut for the Kazakhstan national team in a friendly 1–0 win over Moldova on 21 February 2019.

== Career statistics ==
=== Club ===
As of match played 15 October 2026

Appearances and goals by club, season and competition
Club	Season	League			National cup		League Cup		Europe		Other		Total	
Club	Season	Division	Apps	Goals	Apps	Goals	Apps	Goals	Apps	Goals	Apps	Goals	Apps	Goals
Akzhayik	2011	Kazakhstan Premier League	0	0	2	0	—		—		—		2	0
Akzhayik	2012	Kazakhstan Premier League	0	0	1	0	—		—		—		1	0
Akzhayik	2013	Kazakhstan Premier League	9	1	0	0	—		—		—		9	1
Akzhayik	2014	Kazakhstan Premier League	33	0	1	0	—		—		—		34	0
Akzhayik	2015	Kazakhstan Premier League	6	0	2	0	—		—		—		8	0
Akzhayik	2016	Kazakhstan Premier League	10	0	0	0	—		—		—		10	0
Akzhayik	2017	Kazakhstan Premier League	23	0	1	0	—		—		—		24	0
Akzhayik	2018	Kazakhstan Premier League	32	0	1	0	—		—		—		33	0
Akzhayik	Total		113	1	8	0	—		—		—		121	1
Zhetysu	2019	Kazakhstan Premier League	21	0	1	0	—		—		—		22	0
Caspiy	2020	Kazakhstan Premier League	2	0	0	0	—		—		—		2	0
Shakhter Karagandy	2021	Kazakhstan Premier League	12	1	0	0	—		—		—		12	1
Akzhayik	2021	Kazakhstan Premier League	25	2	6	0	—		—		—		31	2
Turan	2022	Kazakhstan Premier League	9	0	0	0	—		—		—		9	0
Kyzylzhar	2022	Kazakhstan Premier League	12	0	4	0	—		4 (Note: Appearances in UEFA Conference League)	0	—		20	0
Kyzylzhar	2023	Kazakhstan Premier League	24	0	3	0	—		—		—		27	0
Kyzylzhar	Total		36	0	7	0	—		4	0	—		47	0
Tobol	2024	Kazakhstan Premier League	19	2	3	0	—		4 (Note: Two appearances in UEFA Europa League and UEFA Conference League)	0	1 (Note: Appearance in Kazakhstan Super Cup)	0	27	2
Kairat	2025	Kazakhstan Premier League	16	1	1	0	—		14 (Note: Appearances in UEFA Champions League)	0	1	0	31	1
Kairat	2026	Kazakhstan Premier League	19	0	0	0	—		9 (Note: Six appearances in UEFA Champions League, two appearances in UEFA Europa League, one appearance in UEFA Conference League)	0	1	0	30	0
Kairat	Total		35	1	1	0	—		21	0	1	0	60	1
Career total			270	7	26	0	0	0	32	0	3	0	330	7

=== International ===
As of match played 16 November 2026

Appearances and goals by national team and year
National team	Year	Apps	Goals
Kazakhstan	2019	1	0
Kazakhstan	2021	5	0
Kazakhstan	2023	6	0
Kazakhstan	2024	6	0
Kazakhstan	2025	4	0
Kazakhstan	2026	5	0
Total		27	0

== Honours ==
Kairat

- Kazakhstan Premier League: 2025
- Kazakhstan Super Cup: 2025
