= Albert Gabarayev =

Russian footballer

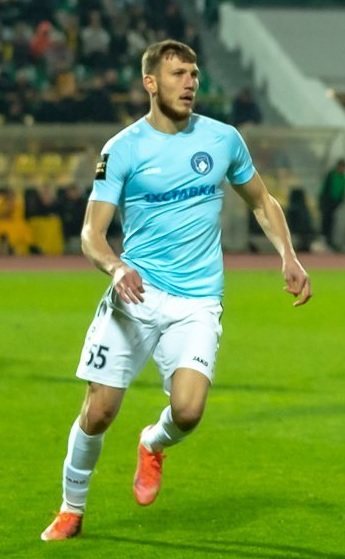
- Gabarayev with Rodina Moscow in 2022

Personal information
- Full name: Albert Zurabovich Gabarayev
- Date of birth: 28 September 1997 (age 29)
- Place of birth: Ardon, North Ossetia–Alania, Russia
- Height: 1.90 m (6 ft 3 in)
- Position: Defender

Team information
- Current team: Fakel Voronezh
- Number: 5

Youth career
- Yunost Vladikavkav

Senior career*
Years	Team	Apps	(Gls)
2017	Afips Afipsky	0	(0)
2017–2018	Rubin Yalta	12	(1)
2019	FC Ardon		
2019	Kafa Feodosia	10	(0)
2020	West Armenia	7	(0)
2020	Gorodeya	12	(1)
2021	Volgar Astrakhan	14	(0)
2021–2022	Noah	21	(0)
2022–2023	Rodina Moscow	15	(0)
2023	→ Tobol (loan)	24	(0)
2024	Tobol	23	(0)
2025–	Fakel Voronezh	33	(3)
- * Club domestic league appearances and goals as of 21 November 2026

Albert Zurabovich Gabarayev (Russian: Альберт Зурабович Габараев; born 28 September 1997) is a Russian football player who plays for Fakel Voronezh.

== Career ==
On 10 February 2023, Kazakhstan Premier League club Tobol announced the signing of Gabarayev.

On 21 January 2025, Gabarayev signed a long-term contract with Fakel Voronezh in the Russian Premier League. He made his RPL debut on 27 April 2025 against Rubin Kazan.

== Career statistics ==
As of 21 November 2026

Club	Season	League			Cup		Continental		Other		Total	
Club	Season	Division	Apps	Goals	Apps	Goals	Apps	Goals	Apps	Goals	Apps	Goals
Afips Afipsky	2017–18	Russian Second League	0	0	0	0	–		–		0	0
West Armenia	2019–20	Armenian First League	7	0	0	0	–		–		7	0
Gorodeya	2020	Belarusian Premier League	12	1	2	0	–		–		14	1
Volgar Astrakhan	2020–21	Russian First League	9	0	0	0	–		–		9	0
Volgar Astrakhan	2021–22	Russian First League	5	0	1	0	–		–		6	0
Volgar Astrakhan	Total		14	0	1	0	0	0	0	0	15	0
Noah	2021–22	Armenian Premier League	21	0	1	0	–		–		22	0
Rodina Moscow	2022–23	Russian First League	15	0	1	1	–		–		16	1
Tobol (loan)	2023	Kazakhstan Premier League	24	0	6	0	7 (Note: Appearances in the UEFA Conference League)	0	–		37	0
Tobol	2024	Kazakhstan Premier League	23	0	3	0	4 (Note: Two appearances in the UEFA Europa League, two appearances in the UEFA Conference League)	0	1 (Note: Appearances in the Kazakhstan Super Cup)	0	31	0
Fakel Voronezh	2024–25	Russian Premier League	3	0	–		–		–		3	0
Fakel Voronezh	2025–26	Russian First League	16	3	3	0	–		–		19	3
Fakel Voronezh	2026–27	Russian Premier League	14	0	3	0	–		–		17	0
Fakel Voronezh	Total		33	3	6	0	0	0	0	0	39	3
Career total			149	4	20	1	11	0	1	0	181	5

== Honours ==
Tobol

- Kazakhstan Cup: 2023
- Kazakhstan Super Cup: 2024
