= Adílio (footballer, born 1993) =

Brazilian footballer

Personal information
- Full name: Adílio Correia dos Santos
- Date of birth: 5 July 1993 (age 33)
- Place of birth: Bahia, Brazil
- Height: 1.78 m (5 ft 10 in)
- Position: Winger

Team information
- Current team: Zhenis
- Number: 19

Senior career*
Years	Team	Apps	(Gls)
2014	Leônico	6	(3)
2015	Feirense	7	(1)
2015	→ Botafogo-BA (loan)	8	(6)
2015	Serrano	8	(0)
2016	Galícia	2	(0)
2016–2017	São Martinho	30	(9)
2017–2022	Arouca	101	(22)
2022	→ Académico de Viseu (loan)	13	(1)
2022–2024	Penafiel	47	(5)
2024–	Zhenis	67	(12)
- * Club domestic league appearances and goals as of 1 November 2026

Adílio Correia dos Santos (born 5 July 1993), commonly known as Adílio, is a Brazilian professional footballer who plays as a winger for Kazakhstan Premier League club Zhenis.

== Career ==
=== Feirense ===
Adílio made his league debut for Feirense against Serrano on 1 February 2015. He scored his first league goal for the club against Catuense on 21 March 2015, scoring in the 73rd minute.

=== Serrano BA ===
Adílio made his league debut for Serrano BA against Central on 12 July 2015.

=== Galícia ===
Adílio made his league debut for Galícia against Bahia on 9 March 2016.

=== AR São Martinho ===
Adílio made his league debut for São Martinho against Pedras Rubras on 21 August 2016. He scored his first goal for the club against Trofense on 23 October 2016.

=== Arouca ===
Adílio made his league debut for Arouca against Académico Viseu on the 23 August 2017. He scored his first league goal for the club against Leixões on 10 December 2017.

=== Académico de Viseu ===
Adílio made his league debut for Académico de Viseu against Chaves on 5 February 2022. He scored his first league goal against Feirense on 2 April 2022, scoring in the 66th minute.

=== Penafiel ===
Adílio made his league debut for Penafiel against Leixões on 8 August 2022. He scored his first league goal for the club against U.D. Oliveirense on 4 March 2023, scoring in the 90th+7th minute.

== Career statistics ==
=== Club ===
As of 4 May 2019

Club	Season	League			State League		National Cup		League Cup		Other		Total	
Club	Season	Division	Apps	Goals	Apps	Goals	Apps	Goals	Apps	Goals	Apps	Goals	Apps	Goals
Leônico	2014	–			6 (Note: Appearances in the Campeonato Baiano 2ª Divisão)	3	0	0	–		0	0	6	3
Feirense	2015	–			7 (Note: Appearances in the Campeonato Baiano)	1	0	0	–		0	0	7	1
Botafogo-BA (loan)	2015	–			8	6	0	0	–		0	0	8	6
Serrano	2015	Série D	8	0	0	0	0	0	–		0	0	8	0
Galícia	2016	Série D	0	0	2	0	0	0	–		0	0	2	0
São Martinho	2016–17	Campeonato de Portugal	30	9	–		1 (Note: Appearances in the Taça de Portugal)	1	0	0	0	0	31	10
Arouca	2017–18	LigaPro	7	1	–		0	0	2 (Note: Appearances in the Taça da Liga)	0	0	0	9	1
Arouca	2018–19	LigaPro	28	4	–		2	1	1	0	0	0	31	5
Arouca	Total		35	5	0	0	2	1	3	0	0	0	40	6
Career total			73	14	23	10	3	2	3	0	0	0	102	26
