= Roman Asrankulov =

Kazakhstani footballer

Personal information
- Full name: Roman Maksimovich Asrankulov
- Date of birth: 30 July 1999 (age 27)
- Place of birth: Kostanay, Kazakhstan
- Height: 1.89 m (6 ft 2 in)
- Position: Left-back

Team information
- Current team: Tobol
- Number: 3

Youth career
- Tobol

Senior career*
Years	Team	Apps	(Gls)
2019–	Tobol	94	(3)

International career^{‡}
2020	Kazakhstan U21	3	(0)
2024–	Kazakhstan	3	(0)
- * Club domestic league appearances and goals as of 1 November 2026 ‡ National team caps and goals as of 11 June 2024

Roman Maksimovich Asrankulov (Russian: Роман Максимович Асранкулов; born 30 July 1999) is a Kazakhstani football player who plays as a left-back for Tobol and the Kazakhstan national team.

== International career ==
Asrankulov made his debut for the senior Kazakhstan national team on 26 March 2024 in a friendly against Luxembourg.
