= Godberg Cooper =

Italian footballer (born 1997)

Personal information
- Full name: Godberg Barry Cooper
- Date of birth: 20 August 1997 (age 29)
- Place of birth: Bergamo, Italy
- Height: 1.91 m (6 ft 3 in)
- Position: Forward

Team information
- Current team: Birżebbuġa St. Peter's
- Number: 97

Youth career
- –2014: Atalanta

Senior career*
Years	Team	Apps	(Gls)
2014–2017	Aurora Seriate	15	(2)
2015–2016	→ USD Scanzorosciate (loan)	22	(4)
2016–2017	→ ASD Verdello (loan)		
2017–2018	Condeixa		
2018–2019	Arouca	0	(0)
2018	→ Espinho (loan)	3	(0)
2019	→ Vianense (loan)	10	(3)
2019–2020	Schaffhausen	6	(0)
2020–2021	Kukësi	18	(3)
2021–2022	Lavello	1	(0)
2022	Makedonija G.P.	12	(2)
2022–2023	Chindia Târgoviște	27	(5)
2023–2024	UTA Arad	21	(3)
2024	Tobol	11	(2)
2024	Al-Hamriyah	0	(0)
2025–2026	ASU Politehnica Timișoara	17	(3)
2026–	Birżebbuġa St. Peter's	2	(0)
- * Club domestic league appearances and goals as of 18 October 2026

Godberg Barry Cooper (born 20 August 1997) is an Italian professional footballer who plays as a forward for Birżebbuġa St. Peter's.

== Career ==
On 3 July 2024, Tobol announced the departure of Cooper by mutual consent.

Recently he signed for Birżebbuġa St. Peter's.

== Honours ==
Makedonija Gjorče Petrov

- Macedonian Football Cup: 2021–22

ASU Politehnica Timișoara

- Liga III: 2025–26
