= Igor Ivanović (Serbian footballer) =

Serbian footballer

Personal information
- Date of birth: 28 July 1997 (age 29)
- Place of birth: Jagodina, FR Yugoslavia
- Height: 1.75 m (5 ft 9 in)
- Position: Attacking midfielder

Team information
- Current team: Radnik Surdulica
- Number: 10

Youth career
- Jagodina

Senior career*
Years	Team	Apps	(Gls)
2014–2017	Jagodina	37	(4)
2017–2019	Napredak Kruševac	41	(10)
2020–2022	Shakhtyor Soligorsk	72	(16)
2023	Astana	5	(0)
2023	→ Tobol (loan)	9	(2)
2024–2025	Tobol	22	(5)
2025	Nantong Zhiyun	16	(4)
2026–	Radnik Surdulica	6	(0)
- * Club domestic league appearances and goals as of 12 June 2026

Igor Ivanović (Serbian Cyrillic: Игор Ивановић; born 28 July 1997) is a Serbian professional footballer who plays as an attacking midfielder for Serbian SuperLiga club Radnik Surdulica.

== Career ==
Ivanović started out with his hometown club Jagodina, making his Serbian SuperLiga debut in August 2014, aged 17. He was transferred to Napredak Kruševac in August 2017.

On 30 March 2023, Ivanović signed for Astana.

On 25 July 2023, Tobol announced the signing of Ivanović on loan from Astana for the remainder of the 2023 season.
