= Pape-Alioune Ndiaye =

French footballer (born 1998)

Personal information
- Date of birth: 4 February 1998 (age 28)
- Place of birth: Nanterre, France
- Height: 2.01 m (6 ft 7 in)
- Position: Centre-back

Team information
- Current team: Tobol
- Number: 5

Youth career
- Boulogne-Billancourt
- –2013: Caen
- 2013–2016: Valenciennes
- 2016: Auxerre
- 2016: Bologna
- 2016–2017: Bari

Senior career*
Years	Team	Apps	(Gls)
2017–2018	Lorca Deportiva	13	(1)
2019–2021	Vorskla Poltava	35	(0)
2021–2023	Rheindorf Altach	23	(0)
2022–2023	Rheindorf Altach II	15	(0)
2023–2024	Şanlıurfaspor	15	(0)
2024–	Tobol	67	(1)
- * Club domestic league appearances and goals as of 1 November 2026

Pape-Alioune Ndiaye (born 4 February 1998) is a French footballer who plays as a centre-back for Kazakhstan Premier League club Tobol.

== Career ==
=== Early years ===
Ndiaye started his career in the youth department of Boulogne-Billancourt and was signed to the youth teams of Caen, playing alongside future talents such as Yann Karamoh and Jean-Victor Makengo before joining Valenciennes at 15-years-old.

In the Valenciennes academy, Ndiaye played alongside Dayot Upamecano, a player to whom he remained close to throughout his career. It was at the same time as the latter that he left Valencienne in 2016, who were in financial turmoil. While Upamecano left for RB Leipzig, Ndiaye joined Auxerre, where he only played for a few months before joining Italian club Bologna. At the Serie A club, he played with the U19s and also practices with the first team under the leadership of Roberto Donadoni. Ndiaye later stated, that he became the victim of player agents wanting to turn his development into profit, instead of focusing on naturally growing his talent. It was in this light that he joined Bari in Serie B.

=== Lorca Deportiva ===
Having changed agents after his difficult stint in Italy, Ndiaye moved to Segunda División B club Lorca Deportiva in 2017, where he would go on to make his senior debut. He put in several good performances during his first season, mainly as a defensive midfielder.

Ndiaye scored his first senior goal on 5 November 2017 in a match against San Fernando — a spectacular strike from outside the box. However, Lorca would end up suffering relegation to the fourth division. At the end of the season, he terminated his contract by mutual consent.

Suddenly a free agent, Ndiaye suffered a metatarsal injury that put his career on hold for more than nine months.

=== Vorskla Poltava ===
In the summer of 2019, Ndiaye went on a trial with Ukrainian club Vorskla Poltava, where he was signed. He would flourish in the Ukrainian Premier League, especially from 2020, where he establishes himself as a mainstay at centre-back. Most notably, he would perform well in a victory against champions Shakhtar Donetsk, inflicting their only defeat of the season.

During the 2020–21 season, Ndiaye continued in great form and attracted the interest of several foreign clubs, including as West Ham United, Lille, Braga and Beşiktaş.

He was also awarded the title of best defender of the first half of the season, where Vorskla were among the best teams in the league behind Shakhtar and Dynamo Kyiv, while his contract would expire in the summer of 2021.

=== Rheindorf Altach ===
Ndiaye signed a two-year contract with Austrian Football Bundesliga club Rheindorf Altach in August 2021. He made 23 appearances in the Bundesliga for Altach over two seasons, and also played for the second team in the Vorarlbergliga and Eliteliga Vorarlberg. He departed the club as his contract expired at the end of the 2022–23 Austrian Football Bundesliga season.

=== Şanlıurfaspor ===
In July 2023, Ndiaye joined Turkish TFF First League club Şanlıurfaspor. He made his debut for the club on 14 August, starting in a 2–1 league victory against Altay.

=== Tobol ===
On 3 February 2024, Ndiaye signed with Tobol in Kazakhstan.

== Personal life ==
Born in France, Ndiaye is of Senegalese descent. Pape is the brother of Moulaye N'Diaye, a former member of PSG and Crystal Palace academies who played in Belgian Second Division and for Truro City.

== Career statistics ==
As of match played 25 December 2023

Appearances and goals by club, season and competition
Club	Season	League			National cup (Note: Appearances in the Copa del Rey, Ukrainian Cup, Austrian Cup, Turkish Cup)		Other		Total	
Club	Season	Division	Apps	Goals	Apps	Goals	Apps	Goals	Apps	Goals
Lorca Deportiva	2017–18	Segunda División B	13	1	2	0	0	0	15	1
Vorskla Poltava	2019–20	Ukrainian Premier League	14	0	3	0	0	0	17	0
Vorskla Poltava	2020–21	Ukrainian Premier League	21	0	2	0	0	0	1	0
Vorskla Poltava	Total		35	0	5	0	0	0	40	0
Rheindorf Altach	2021–22	Austrian Bundesliga	16	0	0	0	—		16	0
Rheindorf Altach	2022–23	Austrian Bundesliga	7	0	1	0	—		8	0
Rheindorf Altach	Total		23	0	1	0	—		24	0
Rheindorf Altach II	2021–22	Vorarlbergliga	2	0	—		—		2	0
Rheindorf Altach II	2022–23	Austrian Regionalliga	13	0	—		—		13	0
Rheindorf Altach II	Total		15	0	—		—		15	0
Şanlıurfaspor	2023–24	TFF First League	15	0	1	0	—		16	0
Tobol	2024	Kazakhstan Premier League	0	0	0	0	—		0	0
Career total			101	1	9	0	0	0	110	1
