= Ivan Miladinović =

Serbian footballer (born 1994)

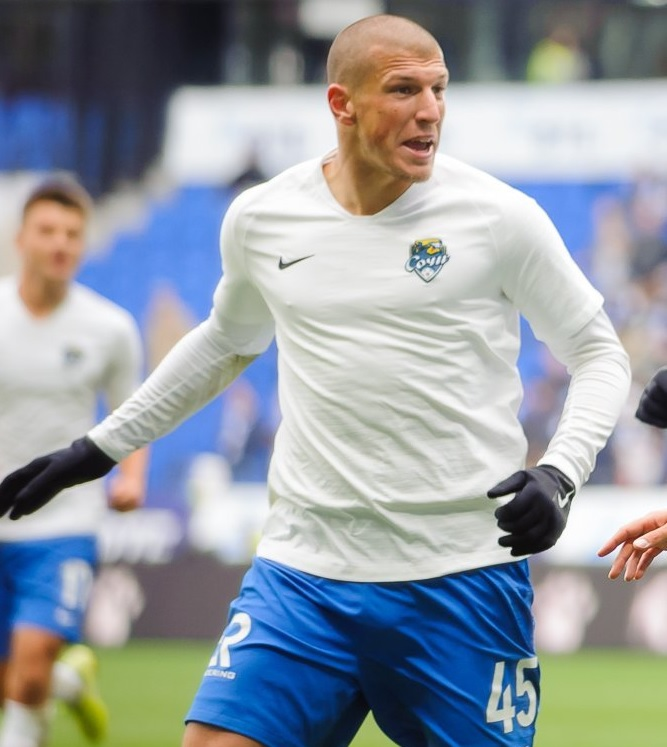
- Miladinović with PFC Sochi in 2019

Personal information
- Date of birth: 14 August 1994 (age 32)
- Place of birth: Ćuprija, Serbia, FR Yugoslavia
- Height: 1.89 m (6 ft 2 in)
- Position: Centre-back

Team information
- Current team: Astana
- Number: 45

Youth career
- Jagodina

Senior career*
Years	Team	Apps	(Gls)
2013–2017	Jagodina	50	(2)
2013–2014	→ Tabane (loan)	28	(6)
2015	→ Sloga Kraljevo (loan)	13	(0)
2017–2018	Radnički Niš	18	(1)
2018–2024	Sochi	104	(3)
2021–2022	→ Nizhny Novgorod (loan)	14	(0)
2024–2025	Tobol	32	(0)
2026	Yelimay	4	(0)
2026–	Astana	6	(0)
- * Club domestic league appearances and goals as of 1 November 2026

Ivan Miladinović (Serbian Cyrillic: Иван Миладиновић; born 14 August 1994) is a Serbian professional footballer who plays as a centre-back for Kazakhstan Premier League club Astana.

== Club career ==
=== Jagodina ===
Born in Ćuprija, Miladinović came throw the Jagodina youth academy. After he overgrown youth team, Miladinović was loaned to the satellite club Tabane for two spells in 2013 and 2014, making 14 appearances with 3 goals in each. In the meantime, he also made his senior debut for Jagodina in the Serbian Cup match against OFK Beograd, played on 9 April 2014.

At the beginning of 2015, Miladinović joined second tier club Sloga Kraljevo as a loaned player until the end of 2014–15 Serbian First League season. Playing for Sloga, Miladinović collected 13 matches, missing two games due to yellow card accumulation, and the red card he earned in a match against Sloboda Užice.

Next the club management made decision to rejuvenate the team, Miladinović returned to Jagodina's first team. He made his professional debut for the club in the first fixture match of the 2015–16 Serbian SuperLiga season, against Mladost Lučani. After Vukašin Tomić left the club at the beginning of 2017, Miladinović ended the 2014–15 Serbian First League season as a team captain.

=== Radnički Niš ===
At the beginning of 2017–18 season, Miladinović moved to Serbian SuperLiga side Radnički Niš, penning a three-year professional contract. He made his debut with new club in 1–1 draw to OFK Bačka on 9 September 2017. Several days later, Miladinović scored his first goal for Radnički in 1–0 victory over Borac Čačak, being also nominated for a man of the match.

=== Sochi ===
On 27 July 2021, he joined Russian Premier League club FC Nizhny Novgorod on loan from PFC Sochi.

On 23 January 2024, Miladinović's contract with Sochi was terminated by mutual consent.

=== Tobol ===
On 1 February 2024, Kazakhstan Premier League club Tobol announced the signing of Miladinović.

=== Yelimay ===
On 18 January 2026, Kazakhstan Premier League club Yelimay announced the signing of Miladinović.} On 5 July 2026, after playing five times for the club, Yelimay announced that Miladinović had left the club after his contract was terminated by mutual agreement.

=== Astana ===
On 7 July 2026, Kazakhstan Premier League club Astana announced the signing of Miladinović.

== Personal life ==
He also holds Russian citizenship.

== Career statistics ==
As of match played 10 December 2023

Appearances and goals by club, season and competition
Club	Season	League			Cup		Continental		Other		Total	
Club	Season	Division	Apps	Goals	Apps	Goals	Apps	Goals	Apps	Goals	Apps	Goals
Tabane (loan)	2013–14	Serbian League East	14	3	—		—		—		14	3
Tabane (loan)	2014–15	Serbian League East	14	3	—		—		—		14	3
Tabane (loan)	Total		28	6	—		—		—		28	6
Sloga Kraljevo (loan)	2014–15	Serbian First League	13	0	—		—		—		13	0
Jagodina	2013–14	Serbian SuperLiga	0	0	1	0	—		—		1	0
Jagodina	2014–15	Serbian SuperLiga	—		—		0	0	—		0	0
Jagodina	2015–16	Serbian SuperLiga	22	0	3	0	—		—		25	0
Jagodina	2016–17	Serbian First League	26 (Note: Does not include the 18 fixture match against OFK Odžaci wrongly attributed to him at Soccerway)	2	2	0	—		—		28	2
Jagodina	2017–18	Serbian First League	2	0	—		—		—		2	0
Jagodina	Total		50	2	6	0	0	0	—		56	2
Radnički Niš	2017–18	Serbian SuperLiga	18	1	1	0	—		—		19	1
Sochi	2018–19	FNL	32	2	0	0	—		—		32	2
Sochi	2019–20	Russian Premier League	22	0	1	0	—		—		23	0
Sochi	2020–21	Russian Premier League	24	1	4	0	—		—		28	1
Sochi	2022–23	Russian Premier League	9	0	3	0	—		—		12	0
Sochi	2023–24	Russian Premier League	17	0	4	0	—		—		21	0
Sochi	Total		104	3	12	0	—		—		116	3
Nizhny Novgorod (loan)	2021–22	Russian Premier League	14	0	1	0	—		—		15	0
Career total			227	12	20	0	0	0	—		247	12
