= Ededem Essien =

Nigerian footballer (born 1998)

Personal information
- Full name: Ededem Edem Essien
- Date of birth: 14 April 1998 (age 28)
- Place of birth: Ikono, Nigeria
- Height: 1.80 m (5 ft 11 in)
- Position: Defensive midfielder

Senior career*
Years	Team	Apps	(Gls)
2020–2021	Van	49	(0)
2022	Al-Nasr Benghazi		
2022–2023	Al Akhdar		
2023–2024	Pari Nizhny Novgorod	6	(0)
2024–2026	Tobol	43	(0)
- * Club domestic league appearances and goals as of 2 January 2026

Ededem Edem Essien (born 14 April 1998) is a Nigerian professional football player who plays as a defensive midfielder.

== Career ==
On 2 August 2023, Essien signed a two-year contract with the Russian Premier League club Pari Nizhny Novgorod. He made his debut for Pari on 8 August 2023 in a Russian Cup game against Spartak Moscow. Essien made his Russian Premier League debut on 14 August 2023 against Akhmat Grozny.

On 9 January 2024, Kazakhstan Premier League club Tobol announced the signing of Essien.
