= Ahmed El Messaoudi =

Moroccan footballer (born 1995)

Personal information
- Date of birth: 3 August 1995 (age 31)
- Place of birth: Brussels, Belgium
- Height: 1.84 m (6 ft 0 in)
- Position: Midfielder

Team information
- Current team: Qingdao Hainiu
- Number: 11

Youth career
- 2005–2010: FC Brussels
- 2010–2013: JMG Academy Lier

Senior career*
Years	Team	Apps	(Gls)
2013–2017	Lierse	46	(0)
2015	→ Standard Liége (loan)	1	(0)
2016–2017	→ Mechelen (loan)	32	(0)
2017–2019	Mechelen	19	(0)
2018–2019	→ Fortuna Sittard (loan)	29	(5)
2019–2021	Groningen	52	(10)
2021–2022	Gaziantep	16	(0)
2022–2024	Emmen	44	(5)
2024–2026	Tobol	46	(11)
2026–	Qingdao Hainiu	0	(0)

International career^{‡}
2014	Belgium U19	5	(0)
2014	Belgium U21	1	(0)
2015–2019	Morocco	2	(0)
- * Club domestic league appearances and goals as of 2 November 2025 ‡ National team caps and goals as of 15 October 2019

Ahmed El Messaoudi (born 3 August 1995) is a professional footballer who plays as a midfielder for Chinese club Qingdao Hainiu. Born in Belgium, he represented Morocco at an international level.

== Club career ==
On 22 June 2019, El Messaoudi was loaned out to Fortuna in the Eredivisie until the end of the 2018–19 season.

On 15 August 2019, El Messaoudi signed with Groningen on a 3-year contract from KV Mechelen for an undisclosed fee.

On 7 September 2021, he signed a three-year contract with Gaziantep in Turkey.

On 30 August 2022, El Messaoudi returned to the Netherlands and signed with Emmen for the season. On 11 January 2024, Emmen announced El Messaoudi's transfer to Tobol in Kazakhstan.

== Career statistics ==
As of match played 26 June 2026

Appearances and goals by club, season and competition
Club	Season	League			Cup		Continental		Other		Total	
Club	Season	Division	Apps	Goals	Apps	Goals	Apps	Goals	Apps	Goals	Apps	Goals
Lierse	2013–14	Belgian Pro League	15	0	0	0	—		—		15	0
Lierse	2014–15	Belgian Pro League	31	0	1	0	—		—		32	0
Lierse	Total		46	0	1	0	—		—		47	0
Standard Liége (loan)	2015–16	Belgian Pro League	1	0	—		2 (Note: Appearances in UEFA Europa League)	0	—		3	0
Mechelen (loan)	2015–16	Belgian Pro League	5	0	—		—		—		5	0
Mechelen (loan)	2016–17	Belgian First Division A	27	0	2	1	—		—		29	1
Mechelen (loan)	Total		32	0	2	1	—		—		34	1
Mechelen	2017–18	Belgian First Division A	19	0	1	0	—		—		20	0
Fortuna Sittard (loan)	2018–19	Eredivisie	29	5	4	0	—		—		33	5
Groningen	2019–20	Eredivisie	20	1	2	0	—		—		22	1
Groningen	2020–21	Eredivisie	29	8	1	0	—		—		30	8
Groningen	2021–22	Eredivisie	3	1	—		—		—		3	1
Groningen	Total		52	10	3	0	—		—		55	10
Gaziantep	2021–22	Süper Lig	16	0	2	0	—		—		18	0
Emmen	2022–23	Eredivisie	25	2	2	0	—		4 (Note: Appearances in Eredivisie relegation play-offs)	0	31	2
Emmen	2023–24	Eerste Divisie	19	3	1	0	—		—		20	3
Emmen	Total		44	5	3	0	—		4	0	51	5
Tobol	2024	Kazakhstan Premier League	24	4	4	3	4 (Note: Two appearances and one goal in UEFA Europa League, two appearances in UEFA Conference League)	1	1 (Note: Appearance in Kazakhstan Super Cup)	0	33	8
Tobol	2025	Kazakhstan Premier League	22	7	4	0	—		—		26	7
Tobol	Total		46	11	8	3	4	1	1	0	59	15
Qingdao Hainiu	2026	Chinese Super League	14	2	0	0	—		—		14	2
career total			299	43	24	4	6	1	5	0	334	48
