= David Henen =

Togolese footballer

Personal information
- Full name: David Boris Philippe Henen
- Date of birth: 19 April 1996 (age 30)
- Place of birth: Libramont-Chevigny, Belgium
- Height: 1.85 m (6 ft 1 in)
- Positions: Winger; striker

Team information
- Current team: Cong An Hanoi
- Number: 8

Youth career
- Virton
- Standard Liège
- 2011–2013: Anderlecht

Senior career*
Years	Team	Apps	(Gls)
2013–2014	Anderlecht	0	(0)
2013–2014	→ Monaco II (loan)	0	(0)
2014–2015	Olympiacos	0	(0)
2014–2015	→ Everton (loan)	0	(0)
2015–2018	Everton	0	(0)
2015–2016	→ Fleetwood Town (loan)	11	(1)
2018–2020	Charleroi	40	(3)
2020–2022	Grenoble	41	(2)
2022–2024	Kortrijk	30	(0)
2024–2025	Tobol	27	(3)
2025–2026	SHB Da Nang	21	(3)
2026–	Cong An Hanoi	0	(0)

International career^{‡}
2010–2011	Belgium U15	9	(4)
2011–2012	Belgium U16	3	(2)
2012	Belgium U17	3	(2)
2013–2014	Belgium U18	4	(2)
2014	Belgium U19	5	(0)
2019–	Togo	20	(1)
- * Club domestic league appearances and goals as of 7 June 2026 ‡ National team caps and goals as of 13:47, 5 March 2025 (UTC)

David Boris Philippe Henen (born 19 April 1996) is a professional footballer who plays as a winger and striker for V.League 1 club Cong An Hanoi. Born in Belgium, he represents the Togo national team.

== Early and personal life ==
Henen was born in Libramont-Chevigny on 19 April 1996.

== Club career ==
Henen played youth football with Virton, Standard Liège and Anderlecht, before moving on loan to French club Monaco II on loan in September 2013.

In July 2014 he was linked with a transfer to English club Everton.

On 1 September 2014, he signed for Greek club Olympiacos, simultaneously moving on loan to Everton for the duration of the 2014–15 season. The transfer was made permanent in July 2015, for a fee of around £200,000.

Henen joined League One club Fleetwood Town on a season long loan on 11 November 2015.

He was released by Everton at the end of the 2017–18 season.

On 31 August 2018, Henen joined Belgian side Charleroi. He signed a contract running to 2020.

In October 2020 he signed for French club Grenoble.

On 31 January 2022, Henen signed a two-and-a-half-year contract with Kortrijk back in Belgium.

On 7 February 2024, Henen joined Tobol in Kazakhstan on a two-year contract.

In August 2025, Henen moved to Vietnam, signing for V.League 1 side SHB Da Nang.

In July 2026, Henen joined V.League 1 fellow Cong An Hanoi.

== International career ==
Henen was born in Belgium to a Belgian father and a Togolese mother, and is eligible for both national teams. He has represented Belgium at youth international level.

Henen represented the Togo national football team in a 1–0 2021 Africa Cup of Nations qualification loss to Comoros on 14 November 2019.

== Style of play ==
Henen has been described as a "pacy and gifted forward."

== Career statistics ==
As of 11 March 2019

Appearances and goals by club, season and competition
Club	Season	League		National cup		League cup		Other		Total	
Club	Season	Apps	Goals	Apps	Goals	Apps	Goals	Apps	Goals	Apps	Goals
Everton	2015–16	0	0	0	0	0	0	0	0	0	0
Everton	2016–17	0	0	0	0	0	0	0	0	0	0
Everton	2017–18	0	0	0	0	0	0	0	0	0	0
Everton	Total	0	0	0	0	0	0	0	0	0	0
Fleetwood Town (loan)	2015–16	11	1	0	0	0	0	2	0	13	1
Charleroi	2018–19	14	2	2	0	0	0	0	0	16	2
Career total		25	3	2	0	0	0	2	0	29	3

=== International ===
Scores and results list Togo's goal tally first, score column indicates score after each Henen goal.

List of international goals scored by David Henen
No.	Date	Venue	Opponent	Score	Result	Competition
1	27 September 2022	Larbi Zaouli Stadium, Casablanca, Morocco	Equatorial Guinea	1–0	2–2	Friendly

== Honours ==
Cong An Hanoi

- Vietnamese Super Cup: 2026
