= 2023 FC Tobol season =

FC Tobol
2023 season
- Chairman: Nikolay Panin
- Manager: Milic Curcic
- Stadium: Central Stadium
- Premier League: 8th
- Kazakhstan Cup: Winners
- Europa Conference League: Play-off round vs Viktoria Plzeň
- Top goalscorer: League: Serges Déblé (7); All: Serges Déblé (10)
- Highest home attendance: 8,420vs Viktoria Plzeň (24 August 2023)
- Lowest home attendance: 1,500vs Shakhter Karagandy (17 May 2023)
- Average home league attendance: 2,454 (21 October 2023)
Home colours	Away colours

The 2023 FC Tobol season was the 25th successive season that the club played in the Kazakhstan Premier League, the highest tier of association football in Kazakhstan. Tobol finished the season in eighth place and won the Kazakhstan Cup, qualifying for the 2024–25 UEFA Europa League. Tobol also participated in the UEFA Europa Conference League were they reached the Playoff Round before being eliminated by Viktoria Plzeň.

== Season events ==
On 4 July, Tobol announced the signing of Momčilo Mrkaić from Borac Banja Luka.

On 25 July, Tobol announced the signing of Yevhen Shakhov from Zorya Luhansk, and the loan signing of Igor Ivanović from Astana.

On 23 August, Tobol announced the return of Ruslan Valiullin to the team following his doping ban.

== Squad ==
As of match played 4 November 2023

No.	Name	Nationality	Position	Date of birth (age)	Signed from	Signed in	Contract ends	Apps.	Goals
Goalkeepers
12	Sultan Busurmanov	(Kazakhstan)	GK	10 May 1996 (aged 27)	Academy	2015		32	0
23	Ivan Konovalov	(Russia)	GK	18 August 1994 (aged 29)	Livingston	2023		28	0
28	Yuri Melikhov	(Kazakhstan)	GK	1 September 2003 (aged 20)	Academy	2021		0	0
Defenders
3	Roman Asrankulov	(Kazakhstan)	DF	30 July 1999 (aged 24)	Academy	2018		60	4
4	Ivan Rogač	(Serbia)	DF	18 June 1992 (aged 31)	Akron Tolyatti	2023		27	2
5	Daniyar Semchenkov	(Kazakhstan)	DF	12 February 1997 (aged 26)	Academy	2019		25	0
15	Albert Gabarayev	(Russia)	DF	28 September 1997 (aged 26)	Rodina Moscow	2023		36	0
17	Timur Zhakupov	(Kazakhstan)	DF	6 September 1995 (aged 28)	Zhetysu	2023		11	0
24	Bagdat Kairov	(Kazakhstan)	DF	27 April 1993 (aged 30)	Ordabasy	2021		74	2
30	Bojan Mlađović	(Serbia)	DF	16 October 1995 (aged 28)	Mladost Novi Sad	2023		31	3
Midfielders
6	Jovan Ilic	(Bosnia and Herzegovina)	MF	30 January 2000 (aged 23)	Novi Sad 1921	2023		38	2
7	Zhaslan Zhumashev	(Kazakhstan)	MF	27 September 2001 (aged 22)	Academy	2020		53	5
10	Serikzhan Muzhikov	(Kazakhstan)	MF	17 June 1989 (aged 34)	Astana	2020		101	12
11	Islam Chesnokov	(Kazakhstan)	MF	21 November 1999 (aged 23)	Belshina Bobruisk	2023		34	8
13	Pavel Zabelin	(Belarus)	MF	30 June 1995 (aged 28)	Shakhtyor Soligorsk	2023		19	1
14	Samat Zharynbetov	(Kazakhstan)	MF	4 January 1994 (aged 29)	Ekibastuz	2017		161	4
18	Pavel Kireyenko	(Russia)	MF	14 June 1994 (aged 29)	Caspiy	2023		29	0
21	Miljan Vukadinović	(Serbia)	MF	27 December 1992 (aged 30)	Vojvodina	2022		47	5
39	Bekzat Ermekbaev	(Kazakhstan)	MF	6 December 2001 (aged 21)	Academy	2023		2	0
47	Vyacheslav Kulpeisov	(Kazakhstan)	MF	24 December 2001 (aged 21)	Academy	2021		9	0
51	Beybit Galym	(Kazakhstan)	MF	25 October 2004 (aged 19)	Academy	2022		22	1
70	Igor Ivanović	(Serbia)	MF	28 July 1997 (aged 26)	on loan from Astana	2023	2023	14	3
90	Yevhen Shakhov	(Ukraine)	MF	30 November 1990 (aged 32)	Zorya Luhansk	2023		14	1
97	Ruslan Valiullin	(Kazakhstan)	MF	9 September 1994 (aged 29)	Unattached	2023		80	5
Forwards
8	Serges Déblé	(Ivory Coast)	FW	1 October 1989 (aged 34)	Pyunik	2023		53	14
19	Momčilo Mrkaić	(Bosnia and Herzegovina)	FW	21 September 1990 (aged 33)	Borac Banja Luka	2023		16	4
Players away on loan
Left during the season
20	Ramazan Orazov	(Kazakhstan)	MF	30 January 1998 (aged 25)	Aksu	2023		24	3
22	Aleksandr Marochkin	(Kazakhstan)	DF	14 February 1990 (aged 33)	Kaisar	2020		79	1
77	Igor Sergeev	(Uzbekistan)	FW	30 April 1993 (aged 30)	Aktobe	2021		66	27
88	Timur Akmurzin	(Russia)	GK	7 December 1997 (aged 25)	Spartak Moscow	2022		14	0
99	Asmir Suljić	(Bosnia and Herzegovina)	MF	11 September 1991 (aged 32)	Sarajevo	2023		20	1

== Transfers ==
=== In ===
Date	Position	Nationality	Name	From	Fee	Ref.
4 July 2023	FW	(Bosnia and Herzegovina)	Momčilo Mrkaić	Borac Banja Luka	Undisclosed	
11 July 2023	MF	(Belarus)	Pavel Zabelin	Shakhtyor Soligorsk	Undisclosed	
25 July 2023	MF	(Ukraine)	Yevhen Shakhov	Zorya Luhansk	Undisclosed	
23 August 2023	MF	(Kazakhstan)	Ruslan Valiullin	Unattached	Free	

=== Loans in ===
Date from	Position	Nationality	Name	From	Date to	Ref.
25 July 2023	MF	(Serbia)	Igor Ivanović	Astana	End of season	

=== Out ===
Date	Position	Nationality	Name	To	Fee	Ref.
28 August 2023	MF	(Kazakhstan)	Ramazan Orazov	Koper	Undisclosed	
6 September 2023	MF	(Bosnia and Herzegovina)	Asmir Suljić	Velež Mostar	Undisclosed	

=== Released ===
Date	Position	Nationality	Name	Joined	Date	Ref.
8 June 2023	FW	(Uzbekistan)	Igor Sergeev	BG Pathum United	13 June 2023	
11 July 2023	DF	(Kazakhstan)	Aleksandr Marochkin	Astana	11 July 2023	
24 July 2023	GK	(Russia)	Timur Akmurzin	Veles Moscow		
21 December 2023	DF	(Kazakhstan)	Bagdat Kairov	Aktobe	11 January 2024	
22 December 2023	FW	(Ivory Coast)	Serges Déblé	Pyunik	11 January 2024	
31 December 2023	DF	(Serbia)	Ivan Rogač	Lokomotiv Tashkent	3 January 2024	
31 December 2023	MF	(Bosnia and Herzegovina)	Jovan Ilić	Novi Sad		
31 December 2023	MF	(Kazakhstan)	Vyacheslav Kulpeisov			
31 December 2023	MF	(Kazakhstan)	Samat Zharynbetov	Ordabasy	16 January 2024	
31 December 2023	MF	(Serbia)	Miljan Vukadinović	Mladost Novi Sad	4 January 2024	
31 December 2023	FW	(Bosnia and Herzegovina)	Momčilo Mrkaić	Sloga Meridian		

== Friendlies ==
2023	–
(UTC+6)

== Competitions ==
=== Overview ===
Competition	First match	Last match	Starting round	Final position	Record							
Competition	First match	Last match	Starting round	Final position	Pld	W	D	L	GF	GA	GD	Win %
Premier League	4 March 2023	29 October 2023	Matchday 1	8th	26	9	7	10	29	33	−4	34.62
Kazakhstan Cup	19 April 2023	4 November 2023	Last 16	Winners	7	5	0	2	8	3	+5	71.43
UEFA Europa Conference League	13 July 2023	31 August 2023	First Qualifying Round	Playoff Round	8	3	1	4	8	10	−2	37.50
Total					41	17	8	16	45	46	−1	41.46

Last updated: 4 November 2023
Source: Competitions

=== Premier League ===
==== Results summary ====
Overall								Home						Away					
Pld	W	D	L	GF	GA	GD	Pts	W	D	L	GF	GA	GD	W	D	L	GF	GA	GD
26	9	7	10	29	33	−4	34	6	3	4	16	13	+3	3	4	6	13	20	−7

Last updated: 29 October 2023.
Source: See Results

==== Results by round ====
Round	1	2	3	4	5	6	7	8	9	10	11	12	13	14	15	16	17	18	19	20	21	22	23	24	25	26
Ground	H	A	H	A	H	A	H	H	A	H	A	H	A	H	H	A	A	A	H	A	H	A	A	A	H	A
Result	W	W	W	D	L	L	D	L	L	W	W	W	L	W	W	L	L	D	D	L	L	D	L	D	D	W
Position	2	4	3	2	5	7	6	6	9	8	7	6	7	6	6	5	6	6	7	7	6	7	8	8	8	8

Source: See Results
A = Away; H = Home; W = Win; D = Draw; L = Loss

==== Results ====
4 March 2023 1	Tobol	3–1	Aksu	Kostanay
18:00 (UTC+6)	Vukadinović 9'; Chesnokov (yellow card) 26' (goal) 59'; Mlađović (yellow card) 72'; Zharynbetov (yellow card) 75'; Muzhikov (yellow card) 89'; Déblé 90+1'	Report	Orazov (yellow card) 32'; Silva 66'; Zhyrgalbek uulu (yellow card) 70'	Stadium: Central Stadium; Referee: Bolat Saryev

10 March 2023 2	Caspiy	0–1	Tobol	Almaty
14:00 (UTC+6)		Report	Gabarayev (yellow card) 16'; Déblé 90+4'	Stadium: Central Stadium; Referee: Elvira Nurmustafina

14 March 2023 3	Tobol	2–1	Shakhter Karagandy	Kostanay
19:00 (UTC+6)	Sergeev 20', 57'	Report	Tolordava (yellow card) 27'; Tattybayev (yellow card) 72' (goal) 90+1' (pen.)	Stadium: Central Stadium; Referee: Daniyar Sakhi

2 April 2023 4	Zhetysu	1–1	Tobol	Taldykorgan
15:00 (UTC+6)	Ardazishvili (yellow card) 43'; Teverov 44'; Hasein (yellow card) 90'	Report	Ilić 8'	Stadium: Zhetysu Stadium; Referee: Saken Baiymbet

9 April 2023 5	Tobol	0–1	Astana	Kostanay
19:00 (UTC+6)	Gabarayev (yellow card) 88'	Report	Ourega (yellow card) 48'; Aymbetov (yellow card) 59'; Tomasov 70'; Ebong (yellow card) 73'; Dosmagambetov (yellow card) 87'	Stadium: Central Stadium; Attendance: 3,000; Referee: Grigory Moskovchenko

16 April 2023 6	Ordabasy	4–1	Tobol	Shymkent
21:00 (UTC+6)	Tagybergen 21'; Auro Jr. (yellow card) 64'; Islamkhan (yellow card) 70'; Abdikholikov 72'; Malyi 77'; Sadovsky 86'	Report	Déblé 22' (yellow card) 82'; Muzhikov (yellow card) 23'; Mlađović (yellow card) 28'; Chesnokov (yellow card) 76'; Konovalov (yellow card) FT	Stadium: Kazhymukan Munaitpasov Stadium; Attendance: 18,000; Referee: Bulat Sariev

23 April 2023 7	Tobol	2–2	Aktobe	Kostanay
16:00 (UTC+6)	Déblé (yellow card) 52'; Sergeev 73', 85'; Ilić (yellow card) 76'; Gabarayev (yellow card) 80'; Suljić (yellow card) 80'	Report	Kenesov 28'; Gadrani 69' (yellow card) 80'; Kasym (yellow card) 80'	Stadium: Central Stadium; Referee: Aleksandr Gauzer

6 May 2023 8	Tobol	2–3	Kairat	Kostanay
17:00 (UTC+6)	Zhumashev 10'; Asrankulov (yellow card) 45+2'; Zharynbetov (yellow card) 51'; Chesnokov 90'; Vukadinović (yellow card) 90+6'	Report	Kurgin (yellow card) 41'; Shushenachev 54'; João Paulo 73'; Arad (yellow card) 90+1'; Sergeyev 90+5'	Stadium: Central Stadium; Attendance: 2,500; Referee: Artem Kuchin

14 May 2023 9	Kaisar	1–0	Tobol	Kyzylorda
19:00 (UTC+6)	Sakhalbaev (yellow card) 37'; Pedro (yellow card) 42'; Pryndeta 55'; Baradzin (yellow card) 85'	Report	Rogač (yellow card) 23'; Suljić (yellow card) 90+6'	Stadium: Gani Muratbayev Stadium; Referee: Elvira Nurmustafina

21 May 2023 10	Tobol	1–0	Maktaaral	Kostanay
16:00 (UTC+6)	Muzhikov (yellow card) 57'; Chesnokov 69'; Suljić (yellow card) 90+3'	Report	Aripov (yellow card) 57'; Abdurakhmanov (yellow card) 73'	Stadium: Central Stadium; Referee: Alexander Aliev

28 May 2023 11	Okzhetpes	1–2	Tobol	Kokshetau
14:00 (UTC+6)	Drachenko 7' (yellow card) 16'; Tsyupa (yellow card) 64'	Report	Muzhikov 17' (pen.); Mlađović (yellow card) 32'; Déblé 72'; Ilić (yellow card) 81'	Stadium: Okzhetpes Stadium; Attendance: 355; Referee: Arman Ismuratov

3 June 2023 12	Tobol	1–0	Kyzylzhar	Kostanay
20:00 (UTC+6)	Chesnokov (yellow card) 38'; Kairov (yellow card) 41'; Déblé 75'	Report	Zyabko (yellow card) 32'; Beryozkin (yellow card) 60'; Tapalov (yellow card) 89'	Stadium: Central Stadium; Attendance: 4,200; Referee: Saken Bayimbet

24 June 2023 13	Atyrau	3–0	Tobol	Atyrau
19:00 (UTC+6)	Imeri 45+3'; Nsungusi 57' (yellow card) 71'; Novak 81'	Report	Orazov (yellow card) 29'; Semchenkov (yellow card) 49'	Stadium: Munaishy Stadium; Attendance: 6,000; Referee: Sergey Nozhenko

2 July 2023 14	Tobol	1–0	Atyrau	Kostanay
20:00 (UTC+6)	Asrankulov (yellow card) 25'; Zharynbetov (yellow card) 32'; Vukadinović (yellow card) 45+5'; Suljić (yellow card) 45+5'; Zhumashev 90+3'	Report	Noyok (yellow card) 20'; Kerimzhanov (yellow card) 45+4' (yellow-red card) 53'; Stasevich (yellow card) 86'	Stadium: Central Stadium; Attendance: 2,000; Referee: Aidyn Tasybaev

23 July 2023 16	Tobol	2–0	Okzhetpes	Kostanay
21:00 (UTC+6)	Orazov 45+1' (pen.); Déblé (yellow card) 75'; Muzhikov 83'; Ilić (yellow card) 88'	Report		Stadium: Central Stadium; Attendance: 2,900; Referee: Rustam Omarov

6 August 2023 18	Tobol	0–2	Kaisar	Kostanay
19:45 (UTC+6)	Shakhov (yellow card) 27'; Zabelin (yellow card) 40'; Zhumashev (yellow card) 49'; Zhakupov (yellow card) 68'; Mrkaić (yellow card) 90+6'	Report	Makhan 12'; Sakhalbaev (yellow card) 35'; Ekra (yellow card) 60'; Sovpel 71'; Kenesbek (yellow card) 82'; Milojko (yellow card) 90+5'; Baradzin (yellow card) 90+6'	Stadium: Central Stadium; Attendance: 2,200; Referee: Elvira Nurmustafina

13 August 2023 19	Kairat	3–0	Tobol	Almaty
19:00 (UTC+6)	Shushenachev 5'; Shirobokov (yellow card) 19'; Tkachenko (yellow card) 28'; Shvyryov 42' (yellow card) 66'	Report	Ilić 12'; Gabarayev (yellow card) 33'; Konovalov (yellow card) 66'; Muzhikov (yellow card) 90+4'	Stadium: Central Stadium; Attendance: 11,345; Referee: Saken Bayimbet
Note: Matched awarded as a 3-0 victory to Kairat on 24 August after Tobol fielded Igor Ivanović who'd already played in a Round 19 for Astana earlier in the season.

20 August 2023 20	Aktobe	1–1	Tobol	Aktobe
20:00 (UTC+6)	Kasym (red card) 55'; Filipović 66'	Report	Rogač (yellow card) 18'; Konovalov (yellow card) 29'; Orazov (yellow card) 36' (goal) 40'; Asrankulov (yellow card) 65'; Kairov (yellow card) 67'; Busurmanov (yellow card) 90'; Semchenkov (yellow card) 90+1'	Stadium: Central Stadium; Attendance: 12,600; Referee: Alexander Zatula

27 August 2023 21	Tobol	0–0	Ordabasy	Kostanay
21:00 (UTC+6)	Zabelin (yellow card) 3'; Zhakupov (yellow card) 38'; Ivanović (yellow card) 79'; Ilić (yellow card) 81'	Report	Malyi (yellow card) 52'	Stadium: Central Stadium; Attendance: 2,000; Referee: Artem Kuchin

16 September 2023 22	Astana	2–1	Tobol	Astana
19:00 (UTC+6)	Darboe 5'; Ourega (yellow card) 12'; Amanović 77'	Report	Muzhikov (yellow card) 78'; Déblé 90+1' (pen.)	Stadium: Astana Arena; Attendance: 7,500; Referee: Grigory Moskovchenko

24 September 2023 23	Tobol	1–2	Zhetysu	Kostanay
18:00 (UTC+6)	Chesnokov 34'; Mlađović (yellow card) 55'; Galym (yellow card) 77'	Report	Rušević 44'; Adil (yellow card) 51'; Nurball 53'; Baltabekov (yellow card) 56'; Revyakin (yellow card) 90+5'	Stadium: Central Stadium; Attendance: 2,000; Referee: Anton Kuchma

27 September 2023 15	Kyzylzhar	1–1	Tobol	Petropavl
15:00 (UTC+6)	Podio (yellow card) 21'; Shakhov 70' (o.g.)	Report	Chesnokov 36'; Gabarayev (yellow card) 45+1'; Zabelin (yellow card) 79'; Kairov (yellow card) 90+3'	Stadium: Karasai Stadium; Attendance: 1,500; Referee: Denis Izmailov

30 September 2023 24	Shakhter Karagandy	2–1	Tobol	Karaganda
17:00 (UTC+6)	Sviridov (yellow card) 19' (goal) 79'; Abdulla 46'; Tolordava (red card) 57'; Pertsukh (yellow card) 66'; Cañas (yellow card) 87'; Shatsky (yellow card) 90+4'	Report	Mrkaić 25'; Gabarayev (red card) 57'; Zhumashev (yellow card) 88'	Stadium: Shakhter Stadium; Attendance: 5,000; Referee: Saken Bayimbet

5 October 2023 17	Maktaaral	1–1	Tobol	Shymkent
16:00 (UTC+6)	Sebaihi (yellow card) 37'; Tursynbay (yellow card) 49'; Semchenkov 58' (o.g.); Dairov (yellow card) 77'	Report	Yudenkov 23' (o.g.); Mlađović (yellow card) 33'; Chesnokov (yellow card) 37'	Stadium: Namys Stadium; Attendance: 800; Referee: Bagdat Abdullaev

21 October 2023 25	Tobol	1–1	Caspiy	Kostanay
18:00 (UTC+6)	Ivanović 25'; Asrankulov (yellow card) 35'; Déblé (red card) 69'	Report	Nabikhanov (yellow card) 48'; Usenov 90+1'	Stadium: Central Stadium; Attendance: 1,500; Referee: Georgy Chekhovsky

29 October 2023 26	Aksu	0–3	Tobol	Pavlodar
15:00 (UTC+6)		Report	Muzhikov (yellow card) 1'; Galym (yellow card) 47'; Zabelin 61'; Ivanović 69'; Déblé 79'	Stadium: Central Stadium; Attendance: 0 Referee: Sayat Karabaev
Note: Match played behind closed doors due to the Kostenko mine disaster.

==== League table ====
Pos	Team	Pld	W	D	L	GF	GA	GD	Pts	Qualification or relegation
6	Kaisar	26	10	6	10	31	30	+1	36	
7	Atyrau	26	8	10	8	24	27	−3	34	
8	Tobol	26	9	7	10	29	33	−4	34	Qualification for the Europa League first qualifying round (Note: Tobol qualified for the Europa League first qualifying round by winning the 2023 Kazakhstan Cup.)
9	Maktaaral (D, R)	26	8	5	13	29	32	−3	29	Expelled from league (Note: Maktaaral were expelled from the league due to failing licensing process.)
10	Shakhter Karagandy	26	7	8	11	31	36	−5	29	

Source: UEFA, Soccerway
Rules for classification: 1) Points; 2) Goal difference; 3) Matches won; 4) Goals scored; 5) Away goals scored; 6) Head-to-head points; 7) Head-to-head matches won; 8) Head-to-head goal difference; 9) Head-to-head goals scored; 10) Head-to-head away goals scored; 11) Draw.
(D) Disqualified; (R) Relegated

=== Kazakhstan Cup ===
19 April 2023 Last 16 1st leg	Tobol	2–0	Aksu	Kostanay
20:00 (UTC+6)	Rogač 22'; Zharynbetov (yellow card) 50'; Orazov (yellow card) 82'; Asrankulov (yellow card) 90+4'; Vukadinović 90+6' (yellow card) 90+6'	Report	Yesimov (yellow card) 55'	Stadium: Central Stadium; Attendance: 1,500; Referee: Ruslan Sultangaliyev

30 April 2023 Last 16 2nd leg	Aksu	2–1 (2–3 agg.)	Tobol	Pavlodar
14:00 (UTC+6)	Turlybek 28' (pen.), 85' (pen.)	Report	Chesnokov (yellow card) 34'; Zhumashev 41' (yellow card) 74'; Asrankulov (yellow card) 45+1'; Suljić (yellow card) 48'; Zhakupov (yellow card) 90+4'	Stadium: Central Stadium; Attendance: 3,150; Referee: Alexander Zatula

17 May 2023 Quarterfinal 1st leg	Tobol	2–0	Shakhter Karagandy	Kostanay
19:00 (UTC+6)	Kireyenko (yellow card) 39'; Sergeev 48'; Chesnokov 87'	Report	Tutkyshev (yellow card) 37'; Blokhin (yellow card) 42'	Stadium: Central Stadium; Attendance: 1,500; Referee: Bulat Sariev

7 June 2023 Quarterfinal 2nd leg	Shakhter Karagandy	1–0 (1–2 agg.)	Tobol	Karaganda
19:00 (UTC+6)	Cañas (penalty missed) 90+1' 90+1'	Report	Asrankulov (yellow card) 34'; Gabarayev (yellow card) 64'; Chesnokov (yellow card) 81'; Marochkin (yellow card) 90'; Konovalov (yellow card) 90+5'	Stadium: Shakhter Stadium; Attendance: 6,000; Referee: Alexander Gauzer

28 June 2023 Semifinal 1st leg	Tobol	1–0	Atyrau	Kostanay
21:00 (UTC+6)	Suljić 83'; Marochkin (yellow card) 90+1'; Zharynbetov (yellow card) 90+2'	Report	Zhumakhanov (yellow card) 8'	Stadium: Central Stadium; Attendance: 2,600; Referee: Elvira Nurmustafina

8 July 2023 Semifinal 2nd leg	Atyrau	0–1 (0–2 agg.)	Tobol	Atyrau
19:00 (UTC+6)	Kerimzhanov (yellow card) 22'; Imeri (yellow card) 56'; Nabikhanov (yellow card) 90+7'	Report	Muzhikov (yellow card) 23'; Konovalov (yellow card) 37'; Chesnokov (yellow card) 56'; Rogač 59'; Vukadinović (yellow card) 68'; Kairov (yellow card) 77'	Stadium: Munaishy Stadium; Attendance: 3,500; Referee: Sayat Karabaev

4 November 2023 Final	Ordabasy	0–1	Tobol	Astana
16:00 (UTC+6)	Fedin (yellow card) 86'; Suyumbayev (yellow card) 90+1'	Report	Chesnokov 67' (yellow card) 67'; Muzhikov (yellow card) 76'	Stadium: Astana Arena; Attendance: 11,200; Referee: Rustam Omarov

=== UEFA Europa Conference League ===
==== Qualifying rounds ====
13 July 2023 First Qualifying Round 1st leg	Tobol (Kazakhstan)	2–1	(Finland) Honka	Kostanay, Kazakhstan
18:00 (UTC+6)	Chesnokov (yellow card) 59'; Vukadinović 62', 75' (yellow card) 76'; Mlađović (yellow card) 71'; Déblé (yellow card) 90+4'	Report	Kaufmann 39'; Ortíz (yellow card) 63'; Alegría (yellow card) 71'	Stadium: Central Stadium; Attendance: 7,543; Referee: Dzmitry Dzmitryieu (Belarus)

20 July 2023 First Qualifying Round 2nd leg	Honka (Finland)	0–0 (1–2 agg.)	(Kazakhstan) Tobol	Vantaa, Finland
22:00 (UTC+6)	Eremenko (yellow card) 44'; Koski (yellow card) 60'; Hernández (yellow card) 90+3'	Report	Muzhikov (yellow card) 49'; Mrkaić (yellow card) 71'	Stadium: Myyrmäen jalkapallostadion Attendance: 1,611; Referee: Lazar Lukić (Serbia)
Note: Honka played their home match at the Myyrmäen jalkapallostadion in Vantaa, instead of their regular stadium, the Tapiolan urheilupuisto in Espoo, which did not meet UEFA requirements.

27 July 2023 Second Qualifying Round 1st leg	Basel (Switzerland)	1–3	(Kazakhstan) Tobol	Basel, Switzerland
23:30 (UTC+6)	Barry 25' (red card) 56'; Calafiori (yellow card) 45+3' (yellow-red card) 68'	Report	Ilić (yellow card) 44'; Zharynbetov (yellow card) 45+3'; Déblé 57' (pen.); Orazov 62' (yellow card) 62'; Chesnokov 71'	Stadium: St. Jakob-Park; Attendance: 12,287; Referee: Gustavo Correia (Portugal)

3 August 2023 Second Qualifying Round 2nd leg	Tobol (Kazakhstan)	1–2 (4–3 agg.)	(Switzerland) Basel	Kostanay, Kazakhstan
20:00 (UTC+6)	Vukadinović (yellow card) 10'; Déblé 43' (pen.); Chesnokov (yellow card) 59'; Asrankulov (yellow card) 82'	Report	Kade 26'; Augustin 32' (pen.) (yellow card) 87'; Frei (yellow card) 45'; Comas (yellow card) 76'	Stadium: Central Stadium; Attendance: 8,420; Referee: Miloš Milanović (Serbia)

10 August 2023 Third Qualifying Round 1st leg	Tobol (Kazakhstan)	1–0	(Republic of Ireland) Derry City	Kostanay, Kazakhstan
20:00 (UTC+6)	Orazov (yellow card) 3'; Asrankulov (yellow card) 15' (goal) 65'; Zharynbetov (yellow card) 45+3'; Mlađović (yellow card) 59'; Chesnokov (yellow card) 67'; Shakhov (yellow card) 90+5'	Report	O'Reilly (yellow card) 50'; Connolly (yellow card) 61'; Patching (yellow card) 71'	Stadium: Central Stadium; Attendance: 8,420; Referee: Walter Altmann (Austria)

18 August 2023 Third Qualifying Round 2nd leg	Derry City (Republic of Ireland)	1–0 (a.e.t.) (1–1 agg.) (5–6 p)	(Kazakhstan) Tobol	Dublin, Republic of Ireland
00:45 (UTC+6)	Patching 15' (pen.); O'Reilly (yellow card) 69'; Duffy (yellow card) 90+5'; Mullen (yellow card) 116'	Report	Déblé (yellow card) 14'; Kairov (yellow card) 72'; Asrankulov (yellow card) 86'; Rogač (yellow card) 104'; Mlađović (yellow card) 118'	Stadium: Tallaght Stadium; Attendance: 3,128; Referee: Peter Kráľovič (Slovakia)
	Penalties
	P. McEleney (penalty scored); B. Kavanagh (penalty scored); Mullen (penalty scored); McEneff (penalty scored); Doherty (penalty missed); C. Kavanagh (penalty scored); Maher (penalty missed)		(penalty scored) Orazov; (penalty scored) Vukadinović; (penalty scored) Shakhov; (penalty scored) Asrankulov; (penalty missed) Ilić; (penalty scored) Mlađović; (penalty scored) Kireyenko
Note: Derry City played their third qualifying round home match at the Tallaght Stadium in Dublin, instead of their regular stadium, the Ryan McBride Brandywell Stadium in Derry, which does not meet UEFA requirements.

24 August 2023 Play-off round 1st leg	Tobol (Kazakhstan)	1–2	Viktoria Plzeň (Czech Republic)	Kostanay, Kazakhstan
20:00 (UTC+6)	Ilić (yellow card) 59'; Asrankulov (yellow card) 62'; Déblé 90+8' (pen.)	Report	Cadu 73'; Kalvach (yellow card) 85' (goal) 89'; Chorý (yellow card) 90+8'	Stadium: Central Stadium; Attendance: 8,420; Referee: Marian Alexandru Barbu (Romania)

31 August 2023 Play-off round 2nd leg	Viktoria Plzeň (Czech Republic)	3–0 (5–1 agg.)	(Kazakhstan) Tobol	Kostanay, Kazakhstan
23:00 (UTC+6)	Chorý 32'; Durosinmi 59'; Kliment (yellow card) 86'; Traoré 90+3'	Report	Kairov (yellow card) 3'; Galym (yellow card) 85'; Ivanović (yellow card) 86'; Mrkaić (yellow card) 90+3'	Stadium: Central Stadium; Attendance: 11,069; Referee: Matej Jug (Slovenia)

== Squad statistics ==
As of match played 4 November 2023

=== Appearances and goals ===
No.	Pos	Nat	Player	Total		Premier League		Kazakhstan Cup		UEFA Europa Conference League	
No.	Pos	Nat	Player	Apps	Goals	Apps	Goals	Apps	Goals	Apps	Goals
3	DF	(Kazakhstan) KAZ	Roman Asrankulov	24	1	10+1	0	6	0	7	1
4	DF	(Serbia) SRB	Ivan Rogač	27	2	14+2	0	3	2	8	0
5	DF	(Kazakhstan) KAZ	Daniyar Semchenkov	9	0	6+1	0	2	0	0	0
6	MF	(Bosnia and Herzegovina) BIH	Jovan Ilić	38	2	18+6	2	5+1	0	5+3	0
7	MF	(Kazakhstan) KAZ	Zhaslan Zhumashev	30	3	4+16	2	5+1	1	0+4	0
8	FW	(Ivory Coast) CIV	Serges Déblé	37	10	9+15	7	3+2	0	8	3
10	MF	(Kazakhstan) KAZ	Serikzhan Muzhikov	37	2	19+5	2	4+2	0	6+1	0
11	MF	(Kazakhstan) KAZ	Islam Chesnokov	34	8	18+4	5	2+4	2	5+1	1
12	GK	(Kazakhstan) KAZ	Sultan Busurmanov	13	0	10	0	3	0	0	0
13	MF	(Belarus) BLR	Pavel Zabelin	19	1	9+1	1	0+1	0	0+8	0
14	MF	(Kazakhstan) KAZ	Samat Zharynbetov	34	0	17+5	0	4	0	8	0
15	DF	(Russia) RUS	Albert Gabarayev	36	0	18+6	0	4+1	0	2+5	0
17	DF	(Kazakhstan) KAZ	Timur Zhakupov	11	0	7+1	0	3	0	0	0
18	MF	(Russia) RUS	Pavel Kireyenko	29	0	7+11	0	3+4	0	0+4	0
19	FW	(Bosnia and Herzegovina) BIH	Momčilo Mrkaić	16	4	9+2	4	0+2	0	0+3	0
21	MF	(Serbia) SRB	Miljan Vukadinović	33	4	14+5	1	3+3	1	8	2
23	GK	(Russia) RUS	Ivan Konovalov	28	0	16	0	4	0	8	0
24	DF	(Kazakhstan) KAZ	Bagdat Kairov	29	2	13+4	0	3+2	0	7	2
30	MF	(Serbia) SRB	Bojan Mlađović	31	3	17+1	0	4+1	0	8	3
39	MF	(Kazakhstan) KAZ	Bekzat Ermekbaev	2	0	1+1	0	0	0	0	0
51	MF	(Kazakhstan) KAZ	Beybit Galym	20	1	6+9	0	1+2	0	0+2	1
70	MF	(Serbia) SRB	Igor Ivanović	14	3	6+3	2	1	0	1+3	1
90	MF	(Ukraine) UKR	Yevhen Shakhov	14	1	7+2	0	1	0	2+2	1
97	MF	(Kazakhstan) KAZ	Ruslan Valiullin	4	0	1+2	0	0+1	0	0	0
Players away from Tobol on loan:
Players who left Tobol during the season:
20	MF	(Kazakhstan) KAZ	Ramazan Orazov	24	1	4+8	0	4+1	0	5+2	1
22	DF	(Kazakhstan) KAZ	Aleksandr Marochkin	17	0	14	0	3	0	0	0
77	FW	(Uzbekistan) UZB	Igor Sergeev	15	5	9+3	4	1+2	1	0	0
99	MF	(Bosnia and Herzegovina) BIH	Asmir Suljić	20	1	3+11	0	5+1	1	0	0

=== Goal scorers ===
Place	Position	Nation	Number	Name	Premier League	Kazakhstan Cup	UEFA Europa Conference League	Total
1	FW	(Ivory Coast)	8	Serges Déblé	7	0	3	10
2	MF	(Kazakhstan)	11	Islam Chesnokov	5	2	1	8
3	FW	(Uzbekistan)	77	Igor Sergeev	4	1	0	5
4	MF	(Serbia)	21	Miljan Vukadinović	1	1	2	4
5	MF	(Kazakhstan)	7	Zhaslan Zhumashev	2	1	0	3
5	MF	(Kazakhstan)	20	Ramazan Orazov	2	0	1	3
7	MF	(Kazakhstan)	10	Serikzhan Muzhikov	2	0	0	2
7	MF	(Serbia)	70	Igor Ivanović	2	0	0	2
7	DF	(Serbia)	4	Ivan Rogač	0	2	0	2
10	MF	(Bosnia and Herzegovina)	6	Jovan Ilić	1	0	0	1
10	FW	(Bosnia and Herzegovina)	19	Momčilo Mrkaić	1	0	0	1
10	MF	(Belarus)	13	Pavel Zabelin	1	0	0	1
10	MF	(Serbia)	99	Asmir Suljić	0	1	0	1
10	DF	(Kazakhstan)	3	Roman Asrankulov	0	0	1	1
10				Own goal	1	0	0	1
				TOTALS	29	8	8	45

=== Clean sheets ===
Place	Position	Nation	Number	Name	Premier League	Kazakhstan Cup	UEFA Europa Conference League	Total
1	GK	(Russia)	23	Ivan Konovalov	5	3	2	10
2	GK	(Kazakhstan)	12	Sultan Busurmanov	2	2	0	4
				TOTALS	7	5	2	14

=== Disciplinary record ===
Number	Nation	Position	Name	Premier League		Kazakhstan Cup		UEFA Europa Conference League		Total	
Number	Nation	Position	Name	Yellow card	Red card	Yellow card	Red card	Yellow card	Red card	Yellow card	Red card
3	(Kazakhstan)	DF	Roman Asrankulov	4	0	3	0	4	0	11	0
4	(Serbia)	DF	Ivan Rogač	2	0	0	0	1	0	3	0
5	(Kazakhstan)	DF	Daniyar Semchenkov	2	0	0	0	0	0	2	0
6	(Bosnia and Herzegovina)	MF	Jovan Ilić	4	0	0	0	2	0	6	0
7	(Kazakhstan)	MF	Zhaslan Zhumashev	2	0	1	0	0	0	3	0
8	(Ivory Coast)	FW	Serges Déblé	3	0	0	0	2	0	5	0
10	(Kazakhstan)	MF	Serikzhan Muzhikov	6	0	2	0	1	0	9	0
11	(Kazakhstan)	MF	Islam Chesnokov	4	0	4	0	3	0	11	0
12	(Kazakhstan)	GK	Sultan Busurmanov	1	0	0	0	0	0	1	0
13	(Belarus)	MF	Pavel Zabelin	3	0	0	0	0	0	3	0
14	(Kazakhstan)	MF	Samat Zharynbetov	3	1	2	0	2	0	7	1
15	(Russia)	DF	Albert Gabarayev	5	1	1	0	0	0	6	1
17	(Kazakhstan)	DF	Timur Zhakupov	2	0	1	0	0	0	3	0
18	(Russia)	MF	Pavel Kireyenko	0	0	1	0	0	0	1	0
19	(Bosnia and Herzegovina)	FW	Momčilo Mrkaić	1	0	0	0	2	0	3	0
21	(Serbia)	MF	Miljan Vukadinović	2	0	2	0	2	0	6	0
23	(Russia)	GK	Ivan Konovalov	2	0	2	0	0	0	4	0
24	(Kazakhstan)	DF	Bagdat Kairov	3	0	1	0	2	0	6	0
30	(Serbia)	DF	Bojan Mlađović	5	0	0	0	3	0	8	0
51	(Kazakhstan)	MF	Beybit Galym	2	0	0	0	1	0	3	0
70	(Serbia)	MF	Igor Ivanović	1	0	0	0	1	0	2	0
90	(Ukraine)	MF	Yevhen Shakhov	1	0	0	0	1	0	2	0
Players who left Tobol during the season:
20	(Kazakhstan)	MF	Ramazan Orazov	2	0	1	0	2	0	5	0
22	(Kazakhstan)	DF	Aleksandr Marochkin	0	0	2	0	0	0	2	0
99	(Bosnia and Herzegovina)	MF	Asmir Suljić	4	0	1	0	0	0	5	0
			TOTALS	64	2	24	0	29	0	117	2
