= 2023 Kazakhstan Cup =

Tournament details
- Country: Kazakhstan
- Teams: 30

Final positions
- Champions: Tobol
- Runners-up: Ordabasy

Tournament statistics
- Matches played: 55
- Goals scored: 166 (3.02 per match)
- Attendance: 118,245 (2,150 per match)
- Top goal scorer: Arman Smailov (13)
- All statistics correct as of 4 November 2023.

The 2023 Kazakhstan Cup (known as the Fonbet Kazakhstan Cup for sponsorship reasons) was the 31st season of the Kazakhstan Cup, the annual nationwide football cup competition of Kazakhstan since the independence of the country. FC Ordabasy were the defending champions.

Tobol won the cup on 4 November 2023 with a win over Ordabasy, qualifying for the 2024–25 UEFA Europa League first qualifying round.

== Background ==
On 17 April, the Kazakhstan Professional Football League announced Russian betting company Fonbet as their new title sponsor.

== Participating clubs ==
The following teams entered the competition:

Kazakhstan Premier League all 14 clubs of the 2023 season	Kazakhstan First League; 11 clubs of the 2023 season	Kazakhstan Second League; 5 clubs of the 2023 season
FC Aksu; FC Aktobe; FC Astana; FC Atyrau; FC Caspiy; FC Kairat; FC Kaisar; FC Kyzylzhar; FC Maktaaral; FC Okzhetpes; FC Ordabasy; FC Shakhter Karagandy; FC Tobol; FC Zhetysu	FC Akademia Ontustik; FC Akzhayik; FC Arys; FC Khan-Tengri; FC Kyran; FC Taraz; FC Turan; FC Yassy; FC Yelimay; FC Zhas Kyran; FC Zhenis	FC AKAS; FC Altai; FC SD Family; FC Ulytau; FC Zhetisay

== Format and schedule ==
Round	Clubs remaining	Clubs involved	First match date
Group Stage	30	16	16 March 2023
Round of 16	16	16	18 April 2023
Quarter-finals	8	8	2023
Semi-finals	4	4	2023
Final	2	2	2023

== Group stage ==
=== Group A ===
Pos	Team	Pld	W	D	L	GF	GA	GD	Pts	Qualification
1	Akzhayik (A)	3	3	0	0	15	3	+12	9	Advanced to Playoff Round
2	Zhas Kyran	3	2	0	1	7	5	+2	6	
3	Altai	3	1	0	2	4	7	−3	3	
4	AKAS	3	0	0	3	0	11	−11	0	

Updated to match(es) played on 24 March 2023. Source: PFLK
(A) Advance to a further round

16 March 2023 1	Akzhayik	5 – 0	AKAS	Shymkent
12:00 (UTC+6)	Smailov 9', 34', 43', 56'; Sapanov 88'	Report	Vasilchenko (yellow card) 13'	Stadium: BIIK Stadium; Attendance: 100; Referee: Samat Zharilkasinov

16 March 2023 1	Altai	0 – 2	Zhas Kyran	Shymkent
15:00 (UTC+6)	Kryukov (red card) 63'	Report	Agzambaev (yellow card) 19'; Seitov 66'; Sabdirov 85' (pen.)	Stadium: BIIK Stadium; Attendance: 70; Referee: Seitmagzum Musaly

20 March 2023 2	AKAS	0 – 3	Altai	Shymkent
12:00 (UTC+6)	Khakimov (yellow card) 12'; Mukhamedzhanov (yellow card) 33'; Pafengut (yellow card) 37'; Dautov (red card) 90+1'	Report	Amanzhanov 13'; Aydos 90+2'; Akhaev 90+3' (pen.)	Stadium: BIIK Stadium; Attendance: 50; Referee: Dias Kustaev

20 March 2023 2	Akzhayik	5 – 2	Zhas Kyran	Shymkent
15:00 (UTC+6)	Smailov 3', 9', 75'; Kobzar (yellow card) 54' (goal) 79' (pen.); Badoyan 61'	Report	Zhaisanbek (yellow card) 8'; Alikhan 63'; Slyamkhan 70'; Aidarbekuly (yellow card) 90+3'	Stadium: BIIK Stadium; Attendance: 100; Referee: Dmitry Vishnyakov

24 March 2023 3	Zhas Kyran	3 – 0	AKAS	Almaty
12:00 (UTC+6)	Nurdaliev (yellow card) 17'; Seitov 40'; Agzambaev 45+5'; Kotov (yellow card) 70'; Alikhan 77'; Yerlan (yellow card) 79'	Report	Zeitlin (yellow card) 24'; Kavkenov (yellow card) 41'; Khakimov (yellow card) 45+4'	Stadium: Zhas Kyran Stadium; Attendance: 400; Referee: Birzhan Serzhanuly

24 March 2023 3	Altai	1 – 5	Akzhayik	Shymkent
15:00 (UTC+6)	Akhaev (yellow card) 43' (goal) 74'	Report	Smailov 9', 63', 88' (yellow card) 56'; Kobzar (yellow card) 26' (goal) 79' (pen.); Syamuk (yellow card) 45'; Omarov 61'	Stadium: BIIK Stadium; Attendance: 100; Referee: Samat Zharilkasinov

=== Group B ===
Pos	Team	Pld	W	D	L	GF	GA	GD	Pts	Qualification
1	Yelimay (A)	3	2	0	1	5	1	+4	6	Advanced to Playoff Round
2	Zhenis	3	1	2	0	6	5	+1	5	
3	Arys	3	1	1	1	4	6	−2	4	
4	Taraz	3	0	1	2	2	5	−3	1	

Updated to match(es) played on 24 March 2023. Source: PFLK
(A) Advance to a further round

17 March 2023 1	Taraz	0 – 1	Arys	Shymkent
12:00 (UTC+6)	Zhumat (yellow card) 23'	Report	Dosanov 18'; Usipkhanov (yellow card) 69'; Maulen (yellow card) 82'	Stadium: BIIK Stadium; Attendance: 500; Referee: Samat Zharilkasinov

17 March 2023 1	Yelimay	0 – 1	Zhenis	Shymkent
15:00 (UTC+6)	Nurgaliyev (yellow card) 13'; Saparov (yellow card) 42'	Report	Kulbekov 52'; Shekiladze (yellow card) 55'	Stadium: BIIK Stadium; Attendance: 70; Referee: Muradbek Khalilov

21 March 2023 2	Taraz	2 – 2	Zhenis	Shymkent
12:00 (UTC+6)	Lesbek (yellow card) 18'; Toibekov (penalty missed) 51' 64'; Ashirbek (yellow card) 51'; Abdulla (yellow card) 54'; Mukanbetzhanov 76' (red card) 76'	Report	Shekiladze 23', 24'; Khairullin (yellow card) 50'; Sapargaliev (yellow card) 59'; Batyrkhanov (yellow card) 82'	Stadium: BIIK Stadium; Attendance: 100; Referee: Eradil Tileuov

21 March 2023 2	Arys	0 – 3	Yelimay	Shymkent
15:00 (UTC+6)	Usipkhanov (yellow card) 45+1'; Zharylkasyn (yellow card) 53'	Report	Yakovlev 8', 24'; Zhitnev 72'; Sovetkazy (yellow card) 83'; Aitbaev (yellow card) 90'	Stadium: BIIK Stadium; Attendance: 200; Referee: Erken Zhantuganov

24 March 2023 3	Zhenis	3 – 3	Arys	Shymkent
12:00 (UTC+6)	Shekiladze 26', 74'; Aubakirov (yellow card) 29'; Mukanov (yellow card) 29'; Dzebniauri 48'; Dzhanuzakov (yellow card) 75'; Amantaev (yellow card) 80'; Dyusembekov (yellow card) 82'	Report	Kuralbaev (yellow card) 21' (yellow-red card) 76'; Suleimen 25'; Syrbay (red card) 27'; Tursynbay 54'; Kaldybay 70'	Stadium: BIIK Stadium; Attendance: 198; Referee: Almaz Akhmetov

24 March 2023 3	Yelimay	2 – 0	Taraz	Shymkent
15:00 (UTC+6)	Zhitnev 16' (pen.), 85' (yellow card) 58'; Karshakevich (yellow card) 18'	Report	Zhaksymbetov (yellow card) 87'	Stadium: BIIK Stadium; Attendance: 200; Referee: Yerken Zhantuganov

=== Group C ===
Pos	Team	Pld	W	D	L	GF	GA	GD	Pts	Qualification
1	Akademia Ontustik (A)	3	2	0	1	11	8	+3	6	Advanced to Playoff Round
2	SD Family	3	1	1	1	5	5	0	4	
3	Ulytau	3	1	1	1	5	6	−1	4	
4	Kyran	3	1	0	2	4	6	−2	3	

Updated to match(es) played on 24 March 2023. Source: PFLK
(A) Advance to a further round

18 March 2023 1	Kyran	0 – 1	Ulytau	Shymkent
12:00 (UTC+6)	Makhambetov (yellow card) 29'; Tuleev (yellow card) 69'; Umarov (yellow card) 73'; Ermekuulu (yellow card) 75'	Report	Torekul 10'; Toktybai (yellow card) 38'; Borovsky (yellow card) 90+3'	Stadium: BIIK Stadium; Attendance: 100; Referee: Muradbek Khalilov

18 March 2023 1	Akademia Ontustik	2 – 3	SD Family	Shymkent
15:00 (UTC+6)	Daniyarov 18'; Turganov (yellow card) 34'; Kanatkali 42' (o.g.); Amangeldy (yellow card) 62'	Report	Shurakhanov 10', 27', 63'; Kairly (yellow card) 14'; Kanatkali (yellow card) 48'; Almukhamedov (yellow card) 52'; Batyrbaev (yellow card) 81'	Stadium: BIIK Stadium; Attendance: 50; Referee: Anton Moltusinov

22 March 2023 2	Kyran	1 – 0	SD Family	Shymkent
12:00 (UTC+6)	Sarbay (yellow card) 54' (goal) 81'; Oralbay (yellow card) 88'	Report	Kanatkali (yellow card) 54'; Dunzurov (yellow card) 87'	Stadium: BIIK Stadium; Attendance: 100; Referee: Evgeny Ermolaev

22 March 2023 2	Ulytau	2 – 4	Akademia Ontustik	Shymkent
15:00 (UTC+6)	Toktybai 43', 72'	Report	Amangeldy 24'; Narkulov 30'; Serikkul 35'; Bortai (yellow card) 44'; Shamil (yellow card) 50'; Mazhit 57' (o.g.); Tkachenko (yellow card) 74'; Daniyarov (yellow card) 76'	Stadium: BIIK Stadium; Attendance: 100; Referee: Vladimir Niklevich

26 March 2023 3	SD Family	2 – 2	Ulytau	Shymkent
12:00 (UTC+6)	Kuanyshbekov 37' (penalty missed) 45' (yellow card) FT; Dunzurov 75'; Nurbay (yellow card) 78'; Almukhamedov (yellow card) 78'	Report	Omarbek 42' (pen.) (yellow card) 50'; Slambekov (yellow card) 44'; Torekul 63' (pen.)	Stadium: BIIK Stadium; Attendance: 50; Referee: Dmitry Vishnyakov

26 March 2023 3	Akademia Ontustik	5 – 3	Kyran	Shymkent
15:00 (UTC+6)	Amangeldy (yellow card) 15' (goal) 40'; Babanazarov 17', 52'; Narkulov 43'; Daniyarov 68'	Report	Oralbay 28' (yellow card) 74'; Rakhmatullaev 38'; Makhambetov 70'; Abzhal (yellow card) 88'	Stadium: BIIK Stadium; Attendance: 300; Referee: Eradil Tileuov

=== Group D ===
Pos	Team	Pld	W	D	L	GF	GA	GD	Pts	Qualification
1	Turan (A)	3	3	0	0	12	3	+9	9	Advanced to Playoff Round
2	Khan-Tengri	3	2	0	1	11	5	+6	6	
3	Yassy	3	1	0	2	2	7	−5	3	
4	Zhetisay	3	0	0	3	0	10	−10	0	

Updated to match(es) played on 24 March 2023. Source: PFLK
(A) Advance to a further round

19 March 2023 1	Turan	4 – 0	Yassy	Shymkent
12:00 (UTC+6)	Nurmugamet 27'; Diallo 47', 49', 76'; Peterman (yellow card) 64'; Klyushkin (yellow card) 88'	Report	Kholmurzaev (yellow card) 11'; Abramov (yellow card) 77'; Nurzhumaev (yellow card) 82'	Stadium: BIIK Stadium; Attendance: 100; Referee: Samat Zharilkasinov

19 March 2023 1	Khan-Tengri	5 – 0	Zhetisay	Shymkent
15 (UTC+6)	Aimanov 3'; Baltabaev 24'; Adakhadzhiev 41'; Kriventsev 45'; Suatbaev 63'; Suyunov (yellow card) 63'	Report		Stadium: BIIK Stadium; Attendance: 120; Referee: Anton Moltusinov

23 March 2023 2	Yassy	1 – 3	Khan-Tengri	Shymkent
12:00 (UTC+6)	Beknur 23'; Nurzhumaev (yellow card) 31'	Report	Abubakar (yellow card) 17'; Maulenov (yellow card) 31'; Medelkhan 33'; Aimanov 48' (pen.); Suatbaev 83'	Stadium: BIIK Stadium; Attendance: 100; Referee: Sergey Popov

23 March 2023 2	Turan	4 – 0	Zhetisay	Shymkent
15:00 (UTC+6)	Taipov 48'; Sultaniyazov 77', 78'; Balashov 88'; Diallo (penalty missed) 90+2'	Report	Strizhkov (yellow card) 90+1'	Stadium: BIIK Stadium; Attendance: 100; Referee: Seitmagzum Musaly

27 March 2023 3	Zhetisay	0 – 1	Yassy	Shymkent
12:00 (UTC+6)		Report	Beknur 56' (pen.); Sabirzhanov (yellow card) 77'	Stadium: BIIK Stadium; Attendance: 48; Referee: Seitmagzum Musaly

27 March 2023 3	Khan-Tengri	3 – 4	Turan	Shymkent
15:00 (UTC+6)	Emirov (yellow card) 39'; Rakhimzhanov (yellow card) 59'; Aimanov 73', 82' (pen.), 85' (pen.); Maulenov (yellow card) 86'	Report	Balashov 25'; Buribaev 44'; Satanov (yellow card) 75' (goal) 80'; Khadzhiev (yellow card) 84' (goal) 90+1'; Bashilov (yellow card) 90'	Stadium: BIIK Stadium; Attendance: 300; Referee: Samat Zharylkasinov

== Playoff stage ==
30 March 2023	Akzhayik	7 – 1	Akademia Ontustik	Shymkent
15:00 (UTC+6)	Yaskovich (yellow card) 13'; Kobzar 21'; Agapov 31', 51'; Smailov 35', 69', 89' (pen.); Badoyan 41'	Report	Zhusupov (yellow card) 13'; Narkulov 39'	Stadium: BIIK Stadium; Attendance: 100; Referee: Samat Zharilkasinov

31 March 2023	Turan	2 – 1 (a.e.t.)	Yelimay	Shymkent
15:00 (UTC+6)	Bashilov 76' (pen.); Diallo 103'	Report	Sovetkazy 45'; Yakovlev (yellow card) 61' (red card) 76'; Kavtaradze (yellow card) 64'; Abilgazy (yellow card) 116'; Mergazy (red card) 120+1'	Stadium: BIIK Stadium; Attendance: 200; Referee: Saken Baimbet

== Knockout stage ==
=== Round of 16 ===
19 April 2023 1st leg	Kyzylzhar	3 – 0	Zhetysu	Petropavl
15:00 (UTC+6)	Veselinović 10'; Muldinov 32'; Jenis (yellow card) 62'; Cheredinov 81'	Report		Stadium: Karasai Stadium; Attendance: 1,500; Referee: Nariman Talapkerov

29 April 2023 2nd leg	Zhetysu	0 – 0 (0 – 3 agg.)	Kyzylzhar	Taldykorgan
15:00 (UTC+6)	Cuckić (yellow card) 34'; Hasein (yellow card) 82'; Hassani (yellow card) 83'	Report		Stadium: Zhetysu Stadium; Attendance: 1,500; Referee: Nikita Utrobin

19 April 2023 1st leg	Caspiy	0 – 1	Turan	Almaty
15:00 (UTC+6)	Podstrelov (yellow card) 21'; Kadyrbaev (yellow card) 48'	Report	Diallo 16'; Satanov (yellow card) 86'; Zhomart (yellow card) 90+3'	Stadium: Zhas Kyran Stadium; Attendance: 300; Referee: Kirill Tkachev

30 April 2023 2nd leg	Turan	2 – 1 (a.e.t.) (3 – 1 agg.)	Caspiy	Shymkent
16:00 (UTC+6)	Lozhkin (yellow card) 72'; Buribaev 96'; Nurmugamet (yellow card) 108' (goal) 117'	Report	Kabylan (yellow card) 44'; Narzildayev 45+2'; Redzhepov (yellow card) 70' (yellow-red card) 90+3'; Berdibek (yellow card) 90+7'	Stadium: Lokomotiv Stadium; Attendance: 150; Referee: Sanzhar Iskakov

19 April 2023 1st leg	Shakhter Karagandy	1 – 0	Okzhetpes	Karaganda
17:00 (UTC+6)	Alishauskas (yellow card) 27'; Sviridov 35'; Tolordava (yellow card) 73'; Bukorac (yellow card) 73'	Report	Idrisov (yellow card) 73'; Sarsenov (yellow card) 73'	Stadium: Shakhter Stadium; Attendance: 1,000; Referee: Nikita Utrobin

29 April 2023 2nd leg	Okzhetpes	0 – 5 (0 – 6 agg.)	Shakhter Karagandy	Astana
13:00 (UTC+6)	Tolebek (yellow card) 44'; Sarsenov (yellow card) 45+1'; Dimitrov (red card) 74'	Report	Chogadze 6'; Pertsukh 12'; Sviridov 15'; Tatayev 32' (o.g.); Savkiv (yellow card) 45'; Tolordava (yellow card) 45+1'; Tattybayev 90+3' (pen.)	Stadium: Astana Arena; Attendance: Elvira Nurmustafina; Referee: 300

19 April 2023 1st leg	Aktobe	2 – 2	Atyrau	Aktobe
17:00 (UTC+6)	Kenesov (yellow card) 14'; Tanzharikov (yellow card) 34'; Yashin (yellow card) 45+2'; Kybyrai (yellow card) 51' (goal) 82'; Santana 71'	Report	Imeri 10' (pen.); Nabikhanov (yellow card) 25'; Antanavičius (yellow card) 45'; Adambaev (yellow card) 70'; Omirtayev 78'; Kerimzhanov (yellow card) 84'	Stadium: Central Stadium; Attendance: 1,800; Referee: Alexander Aliyev

29 April 2023 2nd leg	Atyrau	0 – 0 (a.e.t.) (2 – 2 agg.) (9 – 8 p)	Aktobe	Atyrau
19:00 (UTC+6)	Kerimzhanov (yellow card) 25'; Nsungusi (yellow card) 28'; Stepanov (yellow card) 86'; Takulov (yellow card) 98'	Report	Shomko (yellow card) 20'; Tanzharikov (yellow card) 71'	Stadium: Munaishy Stadium; Attendance: 6,000; Referee: Denis Tevyashov
	Penalties
	Imeri (penalty scored); Noyok (penalty scored); Zhumakhanov (penalty scored); Omirtayev (penalty scored); Stasevich (penalty scored); Stepanov (penalty scored); Pangerey (penalty scored); Urda (penalty scored); Adambaev (penalty scored)		(penalty scored) Kasym; (penalty scored) Raičković; (penalty scored) Samorodov; (penalty scored) Kenesov; (penalty scored) Santana; (penalty scored) Tanzharikov; (penalty scored) Penchikov; (penalty scored) Zhumabek; (penalty missed) Strumia

19 April 2023 1st leg	Kairat	2 – 1	Akzhayik	Almaty
19:00 (UTC+6)	Buranchiev (yellow card) 55'; Sergeyev 66'; Shushenachev 68'; Shirobokov (yellow card) 89'; Ustimenko (yellow card) 90+4' (red card) 90+4'	Report	Kobzar 56'	Stadium: Central Stadium; Attendance: 4,000; Referee: Arman Ismuratov

30 April 2023 2nd leg	Akzhayik	0 – 0 (1 – 2 agg.)	Kairat	Oral
18:00 (UTC+6)	Konlimkos (yellow card) 55'	Report	Arad (yellow card) 62'; Sergeyev (yellow card) 73'	Stadium: Petr Atoyan Stadium; Attendance: 2,500; Referee: Saken Bayimbet

19 April 2023 1st leg	Tobol	2 – 0	Aksu	Kostanay
20:00 (UTC+6)	Rogač 22'; Zharynbetov (yellow card) 50'; Orazov (yellow card) 82'; Asrankulov (yellow card) 90+4'; Vukadinović 90+6' (yellow card) 90+6'	Report	Yesimov (yellow card) 55'	Stadium: Central Stadium; Attendance: 1,500; Referee: Ruslan Sultangaliyev

30 April 2023 2nd leg	Aksu	2 – 1 (2 – 3 agg.)	Tobol	Pavlodar
14:00 (UTC+6)	Turlybek 28' (pen.), 85' (pen.)	Report	Chesnokov (yellow card) 34'; Zhumashev 41' (yellow card) 74'; Asrankulov (yellow card) 45+1'; Suljić (yellow card) 48'; Zhakupov (yellow card) 90+4'	Stadium: Central Stadium; Attendance: 3,150; Referee: Alexander Zatula

19 April 2023 1st leg	Astana	5 – 1	Kaisar	Astana
21:00 (UTC+6)	Darboe 11' (pen.), 16'; Tomašević 25'; Jovančić (yellow card) 36'; Astanov 55', 77'	Report	Makhan (yellow card) 23'; Sakhalbaev 57'; Kenesbek (yellow card) 74'	Stadium: Astana Arena; Attendance: 1,500; Referee: Sanjar Iskakov

30 April 2023 2nd leg	Kaisar	0 – 2 (1 – 7 agg.)	Astana	Kyzylorda
20:00 (UTC+6)	Pryndeta (yellow card) 30'; Pedro (yellow card) 45'; Sakhalbaev (yellow card) 81'	Report	Aymbetov 22'; Amanović (yellow card) 80'; Tomasov 90+4'	Stadium: Gani Muratbayev Stadium; Attendance: 3,800; Referee: Sayat Sulikanov

19 April 2023 1st leg	Ordabasy	1 – 2	Maktaaral	Shymkent
21:00 (UTC+6)	Abdikholikov 19'; Petrović (yellow card) 37' (yellow-red card) 85'; Tungyshbayev (yellow card) 77'; Umarov (yellow card) 80'; Fedin (yellow card) 86'; Yerlanov (yellow card) 90+2'	Report	Koné 4'; Sandoval 20'; Doumbia (yellow card) 30'; Braga (yellow card) 67'; Zhaksylykov (yellow card) 81'; Kabananga (yellow card) 86'	Stadium: Kazhymukan Munaitpasov Stadium; Attendance: 11,000; Referee: Anton Moltusinov

29 April 2023 2nd leg	Maktaaral	1 – 4 (3 – 5 agg.)	Ordabasy	Shymkent
21:00 (UTC+6)	Sandoval 14'; Muhammad (yellow card) 55'; Koné (yellow card) 58'; Kalmykov (red card) 80'	Report	Mbodj (yellow card) 29'; Suyumbayev (yellow card) 48'; Tagybergen 66' (pen.), 84'; Sadovsky 76'; Fedin (yellow card) 89'; Umarov 90+2'	Stadium: Kazhymukan Munaitpasov Stadium; Attendance: 6,700; Referee: Rustam Omarov

=== Quarterfinals ===
17 May 2023 1st leg	Kairat	1 – 1	Atyrau	Almaty
19:00 (UTC+6)	Shvyryov 12'; Keiler (yellow card) 21'; Seydakhmet (yellow card) 52'; Kenzhebek (yellow card) 85'	Report	Antanavičius (yellow card) 24'; Stepanov (yellow card) 26'; Karavaev (yellow card) 29'; Takulov (yellow card) 45+5'; Shushenachev 70' (o.g.); Noyok (yellow card) 85'	Stadium: Central Stadium; Attendance: 5,326; Referee: Viktor Antonov

7 June 2023 2nd leg	Atyrau	2 – 1 (3 – 2 agg.)	Kairat	Atyrau
19:00 (UTC+6)	Nsungusi 16', 51'; Imeri (yellow card) 56'; Kerimzhanov (yellow card) 88'	Report	Seydakhmet (yellow card) 22'; Trufanov 67'; Kasabulat (yellow card) 78'; Kurgin (yellow card) 87'; João Paulo (yellow card) 90+3'	Stadium: Munaishy Stadium; Attendance: 6,000; Referee: Alexander Zatula

17 May 2023 1st leg	Tobol	2 – 0	Shakhter Karagandy	Kostanay
19:00 (UTC+6)	Kireyenko (yellow card) 39'; Sergeyev 48'; Chesnokov 87'	Report	Tutkyshev (yellow card) 37'; Blokhin (yellow card) 42'	Stadium: Central Stadium; Attendance: 1,500; Referee: Bulat Sariev

7 June 2023 2nd leg	Shakhter Karagandy	1 – 0 (1 – 2 agg.)	Tobol	Karaganda
19:00 (UTC+6)	Cañas (penalty missed) 90+1' 90+1'	Report	Asrankulov (yellow card) 34'; Gabarayev (yellow card) 64'; Chesnokov (yellow card) 81'; Marochkin (yellow card) 90'; Konovalov (yellow card) 90+5'	Stadium: Shakhter Stadium; Attendance: 6,000; Referee: Alexander Gauzer

17 May 2023 1st leg	Astana	2 – 0	Turan	Astana
17:00 (UTC+6)	Darabayev (yellow card) 22'; Prokopenko 26', 39'; Zhaksylykov (yellow card) 40'	Report	Kakimov (yellow card) 44'	Stadium: Astana Arena; Attendance: 500; Referee: Sergey Nozhenko

7 June 2023 2nd leg	Turan	1 – 1 (1 – 3 agg.)	Astana	Shymkent
17:00 (UTC+6)	Kakimov (yellow card) 52'; Taipov (yellow card) 61'; Sultaniyazov 76'	Report	Darboe 29'	Stadium: Lokomotiv Stadium; Attendance: 200; Referee: Ruslan Sultangaliyev

17 May 2023 1st leg	Ordabasy	2 – 0	Kyzylzhar	Shymkent
21:00 (UTC+6)	Petrović (yellow card) 26'; Astanov (yellow card) 48'; Sadovsky 74'; Tagybergen 77'	Report	Naumov (yellow card) 63'	Stadium: Kazhymukan Munaitpasov Stadium; Attendance: 18,063; Referee: Rustam Omarov

7 June 2023 2nd leg	Kyzylzhar	1 – 0 (1 – 2 agg.)	Ordabasy	Petropavl
17:00 (UTC+6)	Podio (yellow card) 39'; Shakhmetov (yellow card) 66'; Veselinović 73'; Imnadze (yellow card) 90+4'; Shadmanov (yellow card) 90+4'	Report	Auro Jr. (yellow card) 87'; Sadovsky (yellow card) 90+4'	Stadium: Karasai Stadium; Attendance: 1,700; Referee: Grigory Moskovchenko

=== Semifinals ===
28 June 2023 1st leg	Astana	1 – 0	Ordabasy	Astana
19:00 (UTC+6)	Dosmagambetov (yellow card) 21'; Darabayev (yellow card) 36'; Ivanović 73'	Report	S.Astanov (yellow card) 59'; Abdikholikov (yellow card) 83'	Stadium: Astana Arena; Attendance: 11,600; Referee: Saken Baiymbet

6 July 2023 2nd leg	Ordabasy	2 – 0 (a.e.t.) (2 – 1 agg.)	Astana	Shymkent
21:00 (UTC+6)	Umarov 63'; Mbodj (yellow card) 75'; Yerlanov 105'; Suyumbayev (yellow card) 116'	Report	Amanović (yellow card) 45+1'; Astanov (yellow card) 75'; Jovančić (yellow card) 77'; Beysebekov (red card) 112'	Stadium: Kazhymukan Munaitpasov Stadium; Referee: Alexander Gauser

28 June 2023 1st leg	Tobol	1 – 0	Atyrau	Kostanay
21:00 (UTC+6)	Suljić 83'; Marochkin (yellow card) 90+1'; Zharynbetov (yellow card) 90+2'	Report	Zhumakhanov (yellow card) 8'	Stadium: Central Stadium; Attendance: 2,600; Referee: Elvira Nurmustafina

8 July 2023 2nd leg	Atyrau	0 – 1 (0 – 2 agg.)	Tobol	Atyrau
19:00 (UTC+6)	Kerimzhanov (yellow card) 22'; Imeri (yellow card) 56'; Nabikhanov (yellow card) 90+7'	Report	Muzhikov (yellow card) 23'; Konovalov (yellow card) 37'; Chesnokov (yellow card) 56'; Rogač 59'; Vukadinović (yellow card) 68'; Kairov (yellow card) 77'	Stadium: Munaishy Stadium; Attendance: 3,500; Referee: Sayat Karabaev

=== Final ===
4 November 2023	Ordabasy	0 – 1	Tobol	Astana
16:00 (UTC+6)	Fedin (yellow card) 86'; Suyumbayev (yellow card) 90+1'	Report	Chesnokov 67' (yellow card) 67'; Muzhikov (yellow card) 76'	Stadium: Astana Arena; Attendance: 11,200; Referee: Rustam Omarov

== Goal scorers ==
As of match played 8 July 2023

13 goals:

- (Kazakhstan) Arman Smailov - Akzhayik

5 goals:

- (Kazakhstan) Marlen Aimanov - Khan-Tengri
- (Guinea) Mamadou Diallo - Turan

4 goals:

- (Russia) Yevgeni Kobzar - Akzhayik
- (Georgia (country)) Shota Shekiladze - Zhenis

3 goals:

- (Kazakhstan) Kudaiberdy Narkulov - Akademia Ontustik
- (The Gambia) Dembo Darboe - Astana
- (Kazakhstan) Askhat Tagybergen - Ordabasy
- (Kazakhstan) Sanzhar Shurakhanov - SD Family
- (Kazakhstan) Zikrillo Sultaniyazov - Turan
- (Russia) Maksim Zhitnev - Yelimay

2 goals:

- (Kazakhstan) Yerkebulan Amangeldy - Akademia Ontustik
- (Kazakhstan) Zhavlanbek Babanazarov - Akademia Ontustik
- (Kazakhstan) Bagdat Daniyarov - Akademia Ontustik
- (Kazakhstan) Miras Turlybek - Aksu
- (Armenia) Zaven Badoyan - Akzhayik
- (Kazakhstan) Nikolay Agapov - Akzhayik
- (Kazakhstan) Bauyrzhan Akhaev - Altai
- (Kazakhstan) Elkhan Astanov - Astana
- (Kazakhstan) Vladislav Prokopenko - Astana
- (Nigeria) Effiong Nsungusi - Atyrau
- (Kazakhstan) Tamerlan Suatbaev - Khan-Tengri
- (Bosnia and Herzegovina) Mladen Veselinović - Kyzylzhar
- (Colombia) Juan Sandoval - Maktaaral
- (Belarus) Vsevolod Sadovsky - Ordabasy
- (Uzbekistan) Shokhboz Umarov - Ordabasy
- (Colombia) Roger Cañas - Shakhter Karagandy
- (Kazakhstan) Ivan Sviridov - Shakhter Karagandy
- (Serbia) Ivan Rogač - Tobol
- (Kazakhstan) Islam Chesnokov - Tobol
- (Kazakhstan) Nurgaini Buribaev - Turan
- (Kazakhstan) Rifat Nurmugamet - Turan
- (Ukraine) Vitaliy Balashov - Turan
- (Kazakhstan) Birzhan Toktybai - Ulytau
- (Kazakhstan) Yersultan Torekul - Ulytau
- (Kazakhstan) Ryskul Beknur - Yassy
- (Russia) Pavel Yakovlev - Yelimay
- (Kazakhstan) Amal Seitov - Zhas Kyran
- (Kazakhstan) Amir Alikhan - Zhas Kyran

1 goals:

- (Kazakhstan) Rinat Serikkul - Akademia Ontustik
- (Brazil) Élder Santana - Aktobe
- (Kazakhstan) Yeskendir Kybyrai - Aktobe
- (Kazakhstan) Bauyrzhan Omarov - Akzhayik
- (Kazakhstan) Miram Sapanov - Akzhayik
- (Kazakhstan) Anuar Amanzhanov - Altai
- (Kazakhstan) Oral Aydos - Altai
- (Kazakhstan) Nurbakyt Dosanov - Arys
- (Kazakhstan) Ghani Suleimen - Arys
- (Kazakhstan) Duman Tursynbay - Arys
- (Kazakhstan) Zhanserik Kaldybay - Arys
- (Croatia) Marin Tomasov - Astana
- (Kazakhstan) Abat Aymbetov - Astana
- (Montenegro) Žarko Tomašević - Astana
- (Serbia) Igor Ivanović - Astana
- (North Macedonia) Demir Imeri - Atyrau
- (Kazakhstan) Oralkhan Omirtayev - Atyrau
- (Kazakhstan) Duman Narzildayev - Caspiy
- (Kazakhstan) Artur Shushenachev - Kairat
- (Kazakhstan) Vyacheslav Shvyryov - Kairat
- (Kazakhstan) Yan Trufanov - Kairat
- (Russia) Dmitry Sergeyev - Kairat
- (Kazakhstan) Ruslan Sakhalbaev - Kaisar
- (Kazakhstan) Adam Adakhadzhiev - Khan-Tengri
- (Kazakhstan) Oybek Baltabaev - Khan-Tengri
- (Kazakhstan) Pavel Kriventsev - Khan-Tengri
- (Kazakhstan) Darkhan Medelkhan - Khan-Tengri
- (Kazakhstan) Ablaykhan Makhambetov - Kyran
- (Kazakhstan) Edige Oralbay - Kyran
- (Kazakhstan) Alibobo Rakhmatullaev - Kyran
- (Kazakhstan) Yelzhas Sarbay - Kyran
- (Kazakhstan) Timur Muldinov - Kyzylzhar
- (Kazakhstan) Artem Cheredinov - Kyzylzhar
- (Ivory Coast) Dramane Koné - Maktaaral
- (Kazakhstan) Temirlan Yerlanov - Ordabasy
- (Uzbekistan) Bobur Abdikholikov - Ordabasy
- (Kazakhstan) Ulanbek Kuanyshbekov - SD Family
- (Kazakhstan) Makhmud Dunzurov - SD Family
- (Georgia (country)) Temur Chogadze - Shakhter Karagandy
- (Kazakhstan) Yury Pertsukh - Shakhter Karagandy
- (Kazakhstan) Aydos Tattybayev - Shakhter Karagandy
- (Kazakhstan) Yerkebulan Toibekov - Taraz
- (Kazakhstan) Abzal Mukanbetzhanov - Taraz
- (Bosnia and Herzegovina) Asmir Suljić - Tobol
- (Kazakhstan) Zhaslan Zhumashev - Tobol
- (Serbia) Miljan Vukadinović - Tobol
- (Uzbekistan) Igor Sergeyev - Tobol
- (Kazakhstan) Asludin Khadzhiev - Turan
- (Kazakhstan) Sanjar Satanov - Turan
- (Kazakhstan) Kasymzhan Taipov - Turan
- (Russia) Mikhail Bashilov - Turan
- (Kazakhstan) Adilet Omarbek - Ulytau
- (Kazakhstan) Nursultan Sovetkazy - Yelimay
- (Kazakhstan) Nurdaulet Agzambaev - Zhas Kyran
- (Kazakhstan) Mukhtarkhan Sabdirov - Zhas Kyran
- (Kazakhstan) Ansar Slyamkhan - Zhas Kyran
- (Georgia (country)) Tornike Dzebniauri - Zhenis
- (Kazakhstan) Birzhan Kulbekov - Zhenis

Own goal

- (Kazakhstan) Dias Kanatkali - Akademia Ontustik vs SD Family 18 March 2023
- (Kazakhstan) Samat Mazhit - Ulytau vs Akademia Ontustik 22 March 2023
- (Russia) Aleksei Tatayev - Shakhter Karagandy vs Okzhetpes 29 April 2023
- (Kazakhstan) Artur Shushenachev - Atyrau vs Kairat 17 May 2023
