= 2020 FC Tobol season =

FC Tobol
2020 season
- Chairman: Nikolay Panin
- Manager: Grigori Babayan
- Stadium: Central Stadium
- Kazakhstan Premier League: 2nd
- Kazakhstan Cup: Canceled due to the COVID-19 pandemic
- Top goalscorer: League: Azat Nurgaliev (5); All: Azat Nurgaliev (5)
| Home colours | Away colours |

The 2020 FC Tobol season was the 22nd successive season that the club will play in the Kazakhstan Premier League, the highest tier of association football in Kazakhstan. Tobol will also play in the Kazakhstan Cup and the Europa League.

== Season events ==
On 14 December 2019, Grigori Babayan was announced as Tobol's new head coach.

On 7 February, Tobol announced the signing of Roman Murtazayev on a one-year contract.

On 12 February, Tobol announced the signing of Arman Hovhannisyan from Gandzasar Kapan.

On 17 February, Tobol announced the signing of Aleksa Amanović on a one-year contract, with the option of an additional year.

On 19 February, Tobol announced the signing of Luka Zarandia on loan from Zulte Waregem until 31 July.

On 22 February, Tobol announced the signing of Aleksandr Mokin on a one-year contract.

On 13 March, the Football Federation of Kazakhstan announced all league fixtures would be played behind closed doors for the foreseeable future due to the COVID-19 pandemic. On 16 March the Football Federation of Kazakhstan suspended all football until 15 April.

On 4 April 2020, Maxim Fedin joined FC Kaisar on loan for the remainder of the 2020 season.

On 8 July, Tobol announced the signings of Serhiy Malyi from Astana and Carlos Fonseca from Irtysh Pavlodar.

On 26 June, it was announced that the league would resume on 1 July, with no fans being permitted to watch the games. The league was suspended for a second time on 3 July, for an initial two weeks, due to an increase in COVID-19 cases in the country.

On 27 July, Stephen Eze's contract with Tobol was ended by mutual consent, and Luka Zarandia loan deal from Zulte Waregem expired.

On 4 August, Tobol announced the signing of Jérémy Manzorro from Shakhter Karagandy.

=== New Contracts ===
On 12 January, Dmitri Miroshnichenko signed a new contract with Tobol until the end of 2020.

On 25 February, midfielder Daniyar Semchenkov extended his contract with Tobol until the end of 2020, whilst defender Roman Asrankulov also extended his contract until the end of 2020.

== Squad ==
As of match played 30 November 2020

| No. | Name | Nationality | Position | Date of birth (age) | Signed from | Signed in | Contract ends | Apps. | Goals |
Goalkeepers
| 12 | Sultan Busurmanov | (Kazakhstan) | GK | 10 May 1996 (age 30) | Academy | 2015 | 2020 | 13 | 0 |
| 30 | Igor Shatskiy | (Kazakhstan) | GK | 11 May 1989 (age 37) | Atyrau | 2020 | | 6 | 0 |
| 35 | Aleksandr Mokin | (Kazakhstan) | GK | 19 June 1981 (age 45) | Atyrau | 2020 | 2020 | 13 | 0 |
Defenders
| 4 | Arman Hovhannisyan | (Armenia) | DF | 7 July 1993 (age 33) | Gandzasar Kapan | 2020 | | 3 | 0 |
| 7 | Dmitri Miroshnichenko | (Kazakhstan) | DF | 26 February 1992 (age 34) | Aktobe | 2016 | 2020 | 133 | 4 |
| 8 | Temirlan Yerlanov | (Kazakhstan) | DF | 9 July 1993 (age 33) | Ordabasy | 2020 | | 17 | 1 |
| 17 | Ruslan Valiullin | (Kazakhstan) | DF | 9 September 1994 (age 32) | Aktobe | 2019 | 2020 | 51 | 2 |
| 18 | Daniyar Semchenkov | (Kazakhstan) | DF | 12 February 1997 (age 29) | Academy | 2019 | | 5 | 0 |
| 21 | Sultan Abilgazy | (Kazakhstan) | DF | 22 February 1997 (age 29) | Okzhetpes | 2018 | 2020 | 37 | 2 |
| 23 | Roman Asrankulov | (Kazakhstan) | DF | 30 July 1999 (age 27) | Academy | 2018 | | 6 | 0 |
| 24 | Aleksa Amanović | (North Macedonia) | DF | 24 October 1996 (age 30) | Javor Ivanjica | 2020 | 2020 (+1) | 18 | 0 |
| 25 | Serhiy Malyi | (Kazakhstan) | DF | 5 June 1990 (age 36) | Astana | 2020 | | 26 | 4 |
| 26 | Sagadat Tursynbay | (Kazakhstan) | DF | 26 March 1999 (age 27) | Irtysh Pavlodar | 2020 | | 2 | 0 |
Midfielders
| 10 | Nika Kvekveskiri | (Georgia (country)) | MF | 29 May 1992 (age 34) | Gabala | 2017 | 2020 | 84 | 5 |
| 11 | Serikzhan Muzhikov | (Kazakhstan) | MF | 17 June 1989 (age 37) | Astana | 2020 | 2020 | 18 | 1 |
| 13 | Azat Nurgaliev | (Kazakhstan) | MF | 30 June 1986 (age 40) | Ordabasy | 2018 | 2020 | 238 | 47 |
| 14 | Samat Zharynbetov | (Kazakhstan) | MF | 4 January 1994 (age 32) | Ekibastuz | 2017 | 2020 | 62 | 3 |
| 20 | Jaba Kankava | (Georgia (country)) | MF | 18 March 1986 (age 40) | | 2018 | 2020 | 86 | 4 |
| 44 | Zhaslan Zhumashev | (Kazakhstan) | MF | 27 September 2001 (age 25) | Academy | 2020 | | 1 | 0 |
| 46 | Artem Sherstov | (Kazakhstan) | MF | 16 October 1998 (age 28) | Academy | 2019 | | 15 | 1 |
| 69 | Jérémy Manzorro | (France) | MF | 11 November 1991 (age 35) | Shakhter Karagandy | 2020 | | 15 | 4 |
| 77 | Petros Avetisyan | (Armenia) | MF | 7 January 1996 (age 30) | Ararat-Armenia | 2020 | | 12 | 1 |
| 87 | Carlos Fonseca | (Portugal) | MF | 23 August 1987 (age 39) | Irtysh Pavlodar | 2020 | | 12 | 0 |
| 88 | Roman Ukhanov | (Kazakhstan) | MF | 12 March 1998 (age 28) | Kyzylzhar | 2019 | | 0 | 0 |
Forwards
| 15 | Oralkhan Omirtayev | (Kazakhstan) | FW | 16 July 1998 (age 28) | Shakhter Karagandy | 2020 | | 13 | 1 |
| 19 | Senin Sebai | (Ivory Coast) | FW | 18 December 1993 (age 32) | Tambov | 2019 | | 43 | 10 |
| 45 | Roman Murtazayev | (Kazakhstan) | FW | 10 September 1993 (age 33) | Astana | 2020 | 2020 | 17 | 2 |
Players away on loan
| 96 | Maxim Fedin | (Kazakhstan) | MF | 8 June 1996 (age 30) | Okzhetpes | 2018 | 2020 | 73 | 11 |
| | Aleksandr Marochkin | (Kazakhstan) | DF | 14 February 1990 (age 36) | Kaisar | 2020 | | 0 | 0 |
Left during the season
| 6 | Stephen Eze | (Nigeria) | DF | 8 March 1994 (age 32) | Lokomotiv Plovdiv | 2020 | | 0 | 0 |
| 70 | Luka Zarandia | (Georgia (country)) | MF | 17 February 1996 (age 30) | loan from Zulte Waregem | 2020 | 2020 | 2 | 1 |

=== On loan ===
Note: Flags indicate national team as defined under FIFA eligibility rules; some limited exceptions apply. Players may hold more than one non-FIFA nationality.

| No. / Pos. / Nation / Player; 96 / DF / KAZ / Maxim Fedin (at Kaisar) | No. / Pos. / Nation / Player; — / DF / KAZ / Aleksandr Marochkin (at Kaisar) |

== Transfers ==
=== In ===
| Date | Position | Nationality | Name | From | Fee | Ref. |
|---|---|---|---|---|---|---|
| 16 December 2019 | DF | (Kazakhstan) | Aleksandr Marochkin | Kaisar | Free | |
| 16 December 2019 | MF | (Kazakhstan) | Aslanbek Kakimov | Aktobe | Free | |
| 16 December 2019 | FW | (Kazakhstan) | Oralkhan Omirtayev | Shakhter Karagandy | Free | |
| 5 January 2020 | GK | (Kazakhstan) | Igor Shatskiy | Shakhter Karagandy | Undisclosed | |
| 5 January 2020 | DF | (Kazakhstan) | Temirlan Yerlanov | Ordabasy | Undisclosed | |
| 6 January 2020 | DF | (Kazakhstan) | Sagadat Tursynbay | Irtysh Pavlodar | Undisclosed | |
| 14 January 2020 | MF | (Armenia) | Petros Avetisyan | Ararat-Armenia | Undisclosed | |
| 22 January 2020 | DF | (Nigeria) | Stephen Eze | Lokomotiv Plovdiv | Undisclosed | |
| 22 January 2020 | MF | (Kazakhstan) | Serikzhan Muzhikov | Astana | Free | |
| 7 February 2020 | FW | (Kazakhstan) | Roman Murtazayev | Astana | Free | |
| 12 February 2020 | DF | (Armenia) | Arman Hovhannisyan | Gandzasar Kapan | Undisclosed | |
| 17 February 2020 | DF | (North Macedonia) | Aleksa Amanović | Javor Ivanjica | Undisclosed | |
| 22 February 2020 | GK | (Kazakhstan) | Aleksandr Mokin | Astana | Free | |
| 8 July 2020 | DF | (Kazakhstan) | Serhiy Malyi | Astana | Free | |
| 8 July 2020 | MF | (Portugal) | Carlos Fonseca | Irtysh Pavlodar | Free | |
| 4 August 2020 | MF | (France) | Jérémy Manzorro | Shakhter Karagandy | Free | |

=== Loans in ===
| Date from | Position | Nationality | Name | From | Date to | Ref. |
|---|---|---|---|---|---|---|
| 19 February 2020 | MF | (Georgia (country)) | Luka Zarandia | Zulte Waregem | 31 July 2020 | |

=== Loans out ===
| Date from | Position | Nationality | Name | To | Date to | Ref. |
|---|---|---|---|---|---|---|
| 16 February 2020 | DF | (Kazakhstan) | Aleksandr Marochkin | Kaisar | End of Season | |
| 4 April 2020 | MF | (Kazakhstan) | Maxim Fedin | Kaisar | End of Season | |
| 9 August 2020 | GK | (Kazakhstan) | Stanislav Samoilov | SDYUSSHOR No. 8 | End of Season | |
| 9 August 2020 | DF | (Kazakhstan) | Danil Tsoi | SDYUSSHOR No. 8 | End of Season | |
| 9 August 2020 | FW | (Kazakhstan) | Temirlan Elmurzaev | SDYUSSHOR No. 8 | End of Season | |
| 9 August 2020 | FW | (Kazakhstan) | Artem Sherstov | SDYUSSHOR No. 8 | End of Season | |

=== Released ===
| Date | Position | Nationality | Name | Joined | Date | Ref. |
|---|---|---|---|---|---|---|
| Winter 2020 | DF | (Kazakhstan) | Viktor Dmitrenko | Ordabasy | | |
| Winter 2020 | FW | (Kazakhstan) | Bauyrzhan Turysbek | Shakhter Karagandy | 26 February 2020 | |
| Winter 2020 | FW | (Kazakhstan) | Aslanbek Kakimov | Aktobe | | |
| 5 January 2020 | MF | (Lithuania) | Artūras Žulpa | Zhetysu | | |
| 31 January 2020 | GK | (Azerbaijan) | Emil Balayev | Zira | 3 March 2020 | |
| 4 February 2020 | DF | (Kazakhstan) | Grigori Sartakov | Irtysh Pavlodar | | |
| 12 February 2020 | DF | (Lithuania) | Vytautas Andriuškevičius | Kyzylzhar | | |
| 21 February 2020 | GK | (Kazakhstan) | Andrey Pasechenko | Kyran | | |
| 21 February 2020 | MF | (Russia) | Nikita Bocharov | Turan | 8 March 2021 | |
| 27 July 2020 | DF | (Nigeria) | Stephen Eze | Jamshedpur | 10 September 2020 | |
| 31 December 2020 | GK | (Kazakhstan) | Igor Shatskiy | Shakhter Karagandy | 28 January 2021 | |
| 31 December 2020 | MF | (Kazakhstan) | Maxim Fedin | Aktobe | 27 February 2021 | |

== Friendlies ==
| 25 January 2020 | Tobol (Kazakhstan) | 1 – 1 | (Slovakia) Žilina | Dubai, United Arab Emirates |
| 19:00 (UTC+6) | Sebai 65' | Report | Sluka 47' |

| 6 February 2020 | Tobol (Kazakhstan) | 0 – 0 | (Serbia) Mladost Lučani | Belek, Turkey |
| 20:00 (UTC+6) | | Report |

| 9 February 2020 | Tobol (Kazakhstan) | 0 – 0 | (Bosnia and Herzegovina) Sarajevo | Belek, Turkey |
| (UTC+6) | | Report |

| 12 February 2020 | Tobol (Kazakhstan) | 4 – 2 | (Ukraine) Dynamo Kyiv | Belek, Turkey |
| (UTC+6) | Nurgaliev; Muzhikov; Murtazayev; Avetisyan | Report | Goal |

| 15 February 2020 | Tobol (Kazakhstan) | 0 – 0 | (Belarus) Isloch | Belek, Turkey |
| (UTC+6) | | Report |

| 18 February 2020 | Tobol (Kazakhstan) | 0 – 1 | (Latvia) Spartaks Jūrmala | Belek, Turkey |
| (UTC+6) | | Report |

| 21 February 2020 | Tobol (Kazakhstan) | 0 – 1 | (Belarus) Dynamo Brest | Belek, Turkey |
| (UTC+6) | | Report |

== Competitions ==
=== Premier League ===
==== Results summary ====
| Overall | | | | | | | | Home | | | | | | Away | | | | | |
| Pld | W | D | L | GF | GA | GD | Pts | W | D | L | GF | GA | GD | W | D | L | GF | GA | GD |
|---|---|---|---|---|---|---|---|---|---|---|---|---|---|---|---|---|---|---|---|
| 20 | 12 | 2 | 6 | 26 | 16 | +10 | 38 | 8 | 0 | 2 | 17 | 9 | +8 | 4 | 2 | 4 | 9 | 7 | +2 |

Last updated: 30 November 2020.
Source: See Results

==== Results by round ====
| Round | 1 | 2 | 3 | 4 | 5 | 6 | 7 | 8 | 9 | 10 | 11 | 12 | 13 | 14 | 15 | 16 | 17 | 18 | 19 | 20 | 21 | 22 |
|---|---|---|---|---|---|---|---|---|---|---|---|---|---|---|---|---|---|---|---|---|---|---|
| Ground | H | A | H | A | H | A | H | H | - | H | A | H | A | A | H | A | H | A | - | A | H | A |
| Result | W | D | W | L | W | L | W | L | - | W | D | W | W | L | L | W | W | W | - | W | W | L |
| Position | 2 | 4 | 3 | 6 | 3 | 4 | 3 | 5 | - | 5 | 4 | 3 | 2 | 4 | 4 | 4 | 2 | 2 | - | 2 | 2 | 2 |

Source: See Results
A = Away; H = Home; W = Win; D = Draw; L = Loss

==== Results ====
| 7 March 2020 1 | Tobol | 3 – 1 | Shakhter Karagandy | Kostanay |
| 17:00 (UTC+6) | Murtazayev 17'; Miroshnichenko (yellow card) 33'; Yerlanov (yellow card) 73'; Nurgaliev 87' (yellow card) 90+4'; Zarandia 88' | Report | Manzorro (yellow card) 24'; Baah (yellow card) 35'; Buyvolov 56'; Kislitsyn (yellow card) 60'; Usman (yellow card) 90+4' | Stadium: Tobol Arena; Attendance: 3,000; Referee: Aydin Rakhimbayev |

| 14 March 2020 2 | Zhetysu | 0 – 0 | Tobol | Taldıqorğan |
| 15:00 (UTC+6) | | Report | Zarandia (yellow card) 39' | Stadium: Zhetysu Stadium; Attendance: 0 Referee: Askhat Abdanbayev |
Note: Match played behind closed doors due to the COVID-19 pandemic.

| 1 July 2020 3 | Tobol | 2 – 0 | Caspiy | Kostanay |
| 18:00 (UTC+6) | Nurgaliev 85'; Omirtayev 89' | Report | | Stadium: Central Stadium; Attendance: 0 Referee: Bakhyt Kyzylbaev |
Note: Match originally scheduled for 20 March, but postponed on 16 March due to the COVID-19 pandemic.

| 21 August 2020 5 | Kairat | 3 – 1 | Tobol | Almaty |
| 19:00 (UTC+6) | Kosović 6', 48'; Dugalić 16'; Alip (yellow card) 41'; Mikanović (yellow card) 79' | Report | Avetisyan 66' | Stadium: Central Stadium; Referee: Askhat Abdanbayev |
Note: Match originally scheduled for 11 April and then 10 July, but postponed twice due to the COVID-19 pandemic. Match played behind closed doors due to the COVID-19 pandemic.

| 25 August 2020 4 | Tobol | 2 – 0 | Astana | Talgar |
| 18:00 (UTC+6) | Nurgaliev 31'; Kankava (yellow card) 37'; Muzhikov 57' (yellow card) 57' | Report | Mayewski (yellow card) 43'; Shomko (yellow card) 86' | Stadium: UTB Talgar; Attendance: 0 Referee: Denis Izmailov |
Note: Match originally scheduled for 11 April and then 4 July, but postponed twice due to the COVID-19 pandemic. Match played at the UTB Talgar stadium in Talgar, instead of Tobol's regular Central Stadium in Kostanay. Match played behind closed doors due to the COVID-19 pandemic.

| 29 August 2020 7 | Kaisar | 2 – 1 | Tobol | Almaty |
| 18:00 (UTC+6) | Graf (yellow card) 5'; Reginaldo 20'; Stanisavljević (yellow card) 60'; Tagybergen 76' | Report | Miroshnichenko (yellow card) 45'; Malyi 63'; Muzhikov (yellow card) 81' | Stadium: Central Stadium; Attendance: 0 Referee: Aydin Rakhimbayev |
Note: Match played at the Central Stadium in Almaty, instead of Kaisar's regular Gani Muratbayev Stadium in Kyzylorda. Match played behind closed doors due to the COVID-19 pandemic.

| 12 September 2020 8 | Tobol | 2 – 0 | Kyzylzhar | Almaty |
| 17:00 (UTC+6) | Muzhikov (yellow card) 24'; Miroshnichenko 35'; Nurgaliev 49'; Amanović (yellow card) 55' | Report | | Stadium: Stadïon Akademïï T.S.Segïzbaeva; Attendance: 0 Referee: Saken Bayimbet |
Note: Match played at the Stadïon Akademïï T.S.Segïzbaeva in Almaty, instead of Tobol's regular Central Stadium in Kostanay. Match played behind closed doors due to the COVID-19 pandemic.

| 16 September 2020 6 | Tobol | 0 – 4 | Ordabasy | Almaty |
| 16:00 (UTC+6) | Muzhikov (yellow card) 80' | Report | Brígido 20'; João Paulo 61'; Badibanga 88'; Zhangylyshbay 90+2' (yellow card) 90+3' | Stadium: Jas Qyran Stadium; Attendance: 0 Referee: Artyom Kuchin |
Note: Match played at the Jas Qyran Stadium in Almaty, instead of Tobol's regular Central Stadium in Kostanay. Match played behind closed doors due to the COVID-19 pandemic.

| 22 September 2020 10 | Tobol | 1 – 0 | Okzhetpes | Talgar |
| 15:30 (UTC+6) | Fonseca (yellow card) 21'; Malyi (yellow card) 33'; Manzorro 65' | Report | Obradović (yellow card) 35'; Hawrylovich (yellow card) 68'; T.Zhakupov (yellow card) 79'; S.Zhumakhanov (yellow card) 89' | Stadium: UTB Talgar Stadium; Attendance: 0 Referee: Furkat Atajanov |
Note: Match played at the UTB Talgar Stadium in Talgar, instead of Tobol's regular Central Stadium in Kostanay. Match played behind closed doors due to the COVID-19 pandemic.

| 26 September 2020 11 | Taraz | 0 – 0 | Tobol | Almaty |
| 16:00 (UTC+6) | Nyuiadzi (yellow card) 22'; Silva (yellow card) 44' | Report | Yerlanov (yellow card) 50' | Stadium: Stadïon Akademïï T.S.Segïzbaeva; Attendance: 0 Referee: Bolat Saryev |
Note: Match played at the Stadïon Akademïï T.S.Segïzbaeva in Almaty, instead of Taraz's regular Central Stadium in Taraz. Match played behind closed doors due to the COVID-19 pandemic.

| 2 October 2020 12 | Tobol | 2 – 0 | Zhetysu | Almaty |
| 19:00 (UTC+6) | Amanović (yellow card) 34'; Abilgazy (yellow card) 47'; Kankava 53'; Manzorro 59'; Valiullin (yellow card) 66'; Sebai (yellow card) 82' | Report | Naumov (yellow card) 5'; Kerimzhanov (yellow card) 82' | Stadium: Jas Qyran Stadium; Attendance: 0 Referee: Igor Chesnokov |
Note: Match played at the Jas Qyran Stadium in Almaty, instead of Tobol's regular Central Stadium in Kostanay. Match played behind closed doors due to the COVID-19 pandemic.

| 18 October 2020 13 | Caspiy | 0 – 1 | Tobol | Almaty |
| 19:30 (UTC+6) | Adams (yellow card) 10'; M.Gabyshev (yellow card) 69'; Sebaihi (yellow card) 74'; Shakhmetov (yellow card) 77' | Report | Malyi 71'; Abilgazy (yellow card) 90' | Stadium: Central Stadium; Attendance: 0 Referee: Aydin Rakhimbayev |
Note: Match played at the Central Stadium in Almaty, instead of Caspiy's regular Karasai Stadium in Petropavl. Match played behind closed doors due to the COVID-19 pandemic.

| 22 October 2020 14 | Astana | 1 – 0 | Tobol | Almaty |
| 17:00 (UTC+6) | Postnikov (yellow card) 45'; Shchotkin 66'; Sotiriou (yellow card) 90' | Report | Valiullin (yellow card) 41'; Hovhannisyan (yellow card) 60'; Malyi (yellow card) 85' | Stadium: Jas Qyran Stadium; Attendance: 0 Referee: Denis Tevyashov |
Note: Match played at the Jas Qyran Stadium in Almaty, instead of Astana's regular Astana Arena in Nur-Sultan. Match played behind closed doors due to the COVID-19 pandemic.

| 26 October 2020 15 | Tobol | 0 – 4 | Kairat | Talgar |
| 14:00 (UTC+6) | Fonseca (yellow card) 7'; Manzorro (yellow card) 16'; Yerlanov (yellow card) 76' | Report | Aimbetov 8'; Suyumbayev 28'; Kosović (yellow card) 39' (goal) 44'; Vágner Love 67'; Eseola (yellow card) 90' | Stadium: UTB Talgar; Attendance: 0 Referee: Lakhyt Kyzlbaev |
Note: Match played at the UTB Talgar stadium in Talgar, instead of Tobol's regular Central Stadium in Kostanay. Match played behind closed doors due to the COVID-19 pandemic.

| 30 October 2020 16 | Ordabasy | 0 – 3 | Tobol | Almaty |
| 14:00 (UTC+6) | Dmitrenko (yellow card) 59'; Badibanga (yellow card) 83' | Report | Amanović (yellow card) 26'; Yerlanov (yellow card) 36'; S.Zharynbetov (yellow card) 39'; Malyi (yellow card) 45+2'; Valiullin 48'; Dmitrenko 57' (o.g.); Kankava (yellow card) 61'; Sebai 64' | Stadium: T.S.Segïzbaeva Academy Stadium; Attendance: 0 Referee: Artyom Kuchin |
Note: Match played at the T.S.Segïzbaeva Academy Stadium in Almaty, instead of Shakhter Karagandy's regular Shakhter Stadium in Karaganda. Match played behind closed doors due to the COVID-19 pandemic.

| 3 November 2020 17 | Tobol | 3 – 0 | Kaisar | Almaty |
| 17:00 (UTC+6) | Sebai (yellow card) 20' (goal) 53'; Manzorro 57'; S.Zharynbetov 77'; Abilgazy (yellow card) 82' | Report | S.Abzalov (yellow card) 8'; Gorman (yellow card) 65' | Stadium: Jas Qyran Stadium; Attendance: 0 Referee: Aleksandr Gauzer |
Note: Match played at the Jas Qyran Stadium in Almaty, instead of Tobol's regular Central Stadium in Kostanay. Match played behind closed doors due to the COVID-19 pandemic.

| 8 November 2020 18 | Kyzylzhar | 0 – 1 | Tobol | Almaty |
| 15:00 (UTC+6) | Delić (yellow card) 72'; Markelov (yellow card) 90+2' | Report | Amanović (yellow card) 48'; Yerlanov 70'; Muzhikov (yellow card) 90+4' | Stadium: T.S.Segïzbaeva Academy Stadium; Attendance: 0 Referee: Timur Kumashev |
Note: Match played at the T.S.Segïzbaeva Academy Stadium in Almaty, instead of Kyzylzhar's regular Karasai Stadium in Petropavl. Match played behind closed doors due to the COVID-19 pandemic.

| 24 November 2020 20 | Okzhetpes | 0 – 2 | Tobol | Almaty |
| 18:00 (UTC+6) | S.Zhumakhanov (yellow card) 41' (yellow-red card) 90+2'; M-E.Dzhabrailov (yellow card) 56' | Report | Manzorro 38'; Abilgazy (yellow card) 56' (goal) 59' | Stadium: Jas Qyran Stadium; Attendance: 0 Referee: Igor Chesnokov |
Note: Match played at the Jas Qyran Stadium in Almaty, instead of Okzhetpes's regular Okzhetpes Stadium in Kokshetau. Match played behind closed doors due to the COVID-19 pandemic.

| 27 November 2020 21 | Tobol | 2 – 0 | Taraz | Almaty |
| 18:00 (UTC+6) | Muzhikov (yellow card) 11'; Nurgaliev 27' (pen.); S.Zharynbetov (yellow card) 58'; Manzorro (yellow card) 64'; Amanović (yellow card) 74'; Murtazayev 82' | Report | B.Shadmanov (yellow card) 24'; M.Amirkhanov (red card) 25'; Batsuyev (yellow card) 83' | Stadium: Jas Qyran Stadium; Attendance: 0 Referee: Bolat Saryev |
Note: Match played at the Jas Qyran Stadium in Almaty, instead of Tobol's regular Central Stadium in Kostanay. Match played behind closed doors due to the COVID-19 pandemic.

| 30 November 2020 22 | Shakhter Karagandy | 1 – 0 | Tobol | Almaty |
| 13:00 (UTC+6) | Baah (yellow card) 47' (yellow-red card) 54'; Tkachuk (yellow card) 75'; Khubulov 89' (pen.); Y.Tsuprikov (yellow card) 90+3' | Report | Abilgazy (yellow card) 45+1'; Muzhikov (yellow card) 88'; Kvekveskiri (yellow card) 90' | Stadium: Jas Qyran Stadium; Attendance: 0 Referee: Arman Ismuratov |
Note: Match played at the Jas Qyran Stadium in Almaty, instead of Shakhter Karagandy's regular Shakhter Stadium in Karaganda. Match played behind closed doors due to the COVID-19 pandemic.

==== League table ====
| Pos | Team | Pld | W | D | L | GF | GA | GD | Pts | Qualification or relegation |
|---|---|---|---|---|---|---|---|---|---|---|
| 1 | Kairat (C) | 20 | 14 | 3 | 3 | 48 | 19 | +29 | 45 | Qualification for the Champions League first qualifying round |
| 2 | Tobol | 20 | 12 | 2 | 6 | 26 | 16 | +10 | 38 | Qualification for the Europa Conference League second qualifying round |
| 3 | Astana | 20 | 11 | 3 | 6 | 32 | 21 | +11 | 36 | Qualification for the Europa Conference League second qualifying round |
| 4 | Shakhter Karagandy | 20 | 9 | 5 | 6 | 29 | 22 | +7 | 32 | Qualification for the Europa Conference League second qualifying round |
| 5 | Ordabasy | 20 | 9 | 4 | 7 | 27 | 26 | +1 | 31 | |

Source: UEFA, Soccerway
Rules for classification: 1) Points; 2) Goal difference; 3) Matches won; 4) Goals scored; 5) Away goals scored; 6) Head-to-head points; 7) Head-to-head matches won; 8) Head-to-head goal difference; 9) Head-to-head goals scored; 10) Head-to-head away goals scored; 11) Draw.
(C) Champions

=== Kazakhstan Cup ===
| July 2020 Last 16 | – |
| (UTC+6) |

== Squad statistics ==
As of match played 30 November 2020

=== Appearances and goals ===
| No. | Pos | Nat | Player | Total | | Premier League | | Kazakhstan Cup | |
| No. | Pos | Nat | Player | Apps | Goals | Apps | Goals | Apps | Goals |
|---|---|---|---|---|---|---|---|---|---|
| 4 | DF | (Armenia) ARM | Arman Hovhannisyan | 3 | 0 | 1+2 | 0 | 0 | 0 |
| 7 | DF | (Kazakhstan) KAZ | Dmitri Miroshnichenko | 16 | 1 | 12+4 | 1 | 0 | 0 |
| 8 | DF | (Kazakhstan) KAZ | Temirlan Yerlanov | 17 | 1 | 17 | 1 | 0 | 0 |
| 10 | MF | (Georgia (country)) GEO | Nika Kvekveskiri | 16 | 0 | 10+6 | 0 | 0 | 0 |
| 11 | MF | (Kazakhstan) KAZ | Serikzhan Muzhikov | 18 | 1 | 14+4 | 1 | 0 | 0 |
| 12 | GK | (Kazakhstan) KAZ | Sultan Busurmanov | 1 | 0 | 1 | 0 | 0 | 0 |
| 13 | MF | (Kazakhstan) KAZ | Azat Nurgaliev | 19 | 5 | 14+5 | 5 | 0 | 0 |
| 14 | MF | (Kazakhstan) KAZ | Samat Zharynbetov | 10 | 1 | 6+4 | 1 | 0 | 0 |
| 15 | FW | (Kazakhstan) KAZ | Oralkhan Omirtayev | 13 | 1 | 2+11 | 1 | 0 | 0 |
| 17 | DF | (Kazakhstan) KAZ | Ruslan Valiullin | 13 | 1 | 12+1 | 1 | 0 | 0 |
| 18 | DF | (Kazakhstan) KAZ | Daniyar Semchenkov | 1 | 0 | 0+1 | 0 | 0 | 0 |
| 19 | FW | (Ivory Coast) CIV | Senin Sebai | 14 | 2 | 13+1 | 2 | 0 | 0 |
| 20 | MF | (Georgia (country)) GEO | Jaba Kankava | 19 | 1 | 19 | 1 | 0 | 0 |
| 21 | DF | (Kazakhstan) KAZ | Sultan Abilgazy | 12 | 1 | 6+6 | 1 | 0 | 0 |
| 23 | DF | (Kazakhstan) KAZ | Roman Asrankulov | 4 | 0 | 4 | 0 | 0 | 0 |
| 24 | DF | (North Macedonia) MKD | Aleksa Amanović | 18 | 0 | 18 | 0 | 0 | 0 |
| 25 | DF | (Kazakhstan) KAZ | Serhiy Malyi | 11 | 2 | 11 | 2 | 0 | 0 |
| 26 | DF | (Kazakhstan) KAZ | Sagadat Tursynbay | 2 | 0 | 2 | 0 | 0 | 0 |
| 30 | GK | (Kazakhstan) KAZ | Igor Shatskiy | 6 | 0 | 6 | 0 | 0 | 0 |
| 35 | GK | (Kazakhstan) KAZ | Aleksandr Mokin | 13 | 0 | 13 | 0 | 0 | 0 |
| 44 | MF | (Kazakhstan) KAZ | Zhaslan Zhumashev | 1 | 0 | 1 | 0 | 0 | 0 |
| 45 | FW | (Kazakhstan) KAZ | Roman Murtazayev | 17 | 2 | 10+7 | 2 | 0 | 0 |
| 69 | MF | (France) FRA | Jérémy Manzorro | 15 | 4 | 14+1 | 4 | 0 | 0 |
| 77 | MF | (Armenia) ARM | Petros Avetisyan | 12 | 1 | 2+10 | 1 | 0 | 0 |
| 87 | MF | (Portugal) POR | Carlos Fonseca | 12 | 0 | 9+3 | 0 | 0 | 0 |
Players away from Tobol on loan:
Players who left Tobol during the season:
| 70 | MF | (Georgia (country)) GEO | Luka Zarandia | 2 | 1 | 2 | 1 | 0 | 0 |

=== Goal scorers ===
| Place | Position | Nation | Number | Name | Premier League | Kazakhstan Cup | Total |
|---|---|---|---|---|---|---|---|
| 1 | MF | (Kazakhstan) | 13 | Azat Nurgaliev | 5 | 0 | 5 |
| 2 | MF | (France) | 69 | Jérémy Manzorro | 4 | 0 | 4 |
| 3 | DF | (Kazakhstan) | 25 | Serhiy Malyi | 2 | 0 | 2 |
| 3 | FW | (Ivory Coast) | 19 | Senin Sebai | 2 | 0 | 2 |
| 3 | FW | (Kazakhstan) | 45 | Roman Murtazayev | 2 | 0 | 2 |
| 6 | MF | (Georgia (country)) | 70 | Luka Zarandia | 1 | 0 | 1 |
| 6 | FW | (Kazakhstan) | 15 | Oralkhan Omirtayev | 1 | 0 | 1 |
| 6 | MF | (Armenia) | 77 | Petros Avetisyan | 1 | 0 | 1 |
| 6 | MF | (Kazakhstan) | 11 | Serikzhan Muzhikov | 1 | 0 | 1 |
| 6 | DF | (Kazakhstan) | 7 | Dmitri Miroshnichenko | 1 | 0 | 1 |
| 6 | MF | (Georgia (country)) | 20 | Jaba Kankava | 1 | 0 | 1 |
| 6 | DF | (Kazakhstan) | 17 | Ruslan Valiullin | 1 | 0 | 1 |
| 6 | MF | (Kazakhstan) | 14 | Samat Zharynbetov | 1 | 0 | 1 |
| 6 | DF | (Kazakhstan) | 8 | Temirlan Yerlanov | 1 | 0 | 1 |
| 6 | DF | (Kazakhstan) | 21 | Sultan Abilgazy | 1 | 0 | 1 |
| 6 | | | | Own goal | 1 | 0 | 1 |
| | | | | TOTALS | 26 | 0 | 26 |

=== Clean sheet ===
| Place | Position | Nation | Number | Name | Premier League | Kazakhstan Cup | Total |
|---|---|---|---|---|---|---|---|
| 1 | GK | (Kazakhstan) | 35 | Aleksandr Mokin | 10 | 0 | 10 |
| 2 | GK | (Kazakhstan) | 30 | Igor Shatskiy | 3 | 0 | 3 |
| | | | | TOTALS | 13 | 0 | 13 |

=== Disciplinary record ===
| Number | Nation | Position | Name | Premier League | | Kazakhstan Cup | | Total | |
| Number | Nation | Position | Name | Yellow card | Red card | Yellow card | Red card | Yellow card | Red card |
| 4 | (Armenia) | DF | Arman Hovhannisyan | 1 | 0 | 0 | 0 | 1 | 0 |
| 7 | (Kazakhstan) | DF | Dmitri Miroshnichenko | 2 | 0 | 0 | 0 | 2 | 0 |
| 8 | (Kazakhstan) | DF | Temirlan Yerlanov | 4 | 0 | 0 | 0 | 4 | 0 |
| 10 | (Georgia (country)) | MF | Nika Kvekveskiri | 1 | 0 | 0 | 0 | 1 | 0 |
| 11 | (Kazakhstan) | MF | Serikzhan Muzhikov | 7 | 0 | 0 | 0 | 7 | 0 |
| 13 | (Kazakhstan) | MF | Azat Nurgaliev | 1 | 0 | 0 | 0 | 1 | 0 |
| 14 | (Kazakhstan) | MF | Samat Zharynbetov | 2 | 0 | 0 | 0 | 2 | 0 |
| 17 | (Kazakhstan) | DF | Ruslan Valiullin | 2 | 0 | 0 | 0 | 2 | 0 |
| 19 | (Ivory Coast) | FW | Senin Sebai | 2 | 0 | 0 | 0 | 2 | 0 |
| 20 | (Georgia (country)) | MF | Jaba Kankava | 2 | 0 | 0 | 0 | 2 | 0 |
| 21 | (Kazakhstan) | DF | Sultan Abilgazy | 5 | 0 | 0 | 0 | 5 | 0 |
| 24 | (North Macedonia) | DF | Aleksa Amanović | 5 | 0 | 0 | 0 | 5 | 0 |
| 25 | (Kazakhstan) | DF | Serhiy Malyi | 3 | 0 | 0 | 0 | 3 | 0 |
| 69 | (France) | MF | Jérémy Manzorro | 2 | 0 | 0 | 0 | 2 | 0 |
| 87 | (Portugal) | MF | Carlos Fonseca | 2 | 0 | 0 | 0 | 2 | 0 |
Players away on loan:
Players who left Tobol during the season:
| 70 | (Georgia (country)) | MF | Luka Zarandia | 1 | 0 | 0 | 0 | 1 | 0 |
| | | | TOTALS | 42 | 0 | 0 | 0 | 42 | 0 |
