= Luka Zarandia =

Georgian footballer

Personal information
- Date of birth: 17 February 1996 (age 30)
- Place of birth: Tbilisi, Georgia
- Height: 1.78 m (5 ft 10 in)
- Position: Winger

Youth career
- 2006–2008: Shevardeni Tbilisi
- 2008–2010: School No. 35 Tbilisi
- 2010–2012: Locomotive Tbilisi

Senior career*
Years	Team	Apps	(Gls)
2012–2014	Locomotive Tbilisi	21	(10)
2014–2016	Genk	0	(0)
2016–2017	Locomotive Tbilisi	10	(0)
2017–2019	Arka Gdynia	50	(6)
2019–2022	Zulte Waregem	18	(0)
2020	→ FC Tobol (loan)	2	(1)
2022	Korona Kielce	15	(1)
2023	Dinamo Batumi	0	(0)

International career
2012–2013	Georgia U17	6	(5)
2013–2015	Georgia U19	14	(3)
2016–2018	Georgia U21	11	(4)
2018	Georgia	2	(0)
- * Club domestic league appearances and goals as of 2 November 2022

Luka Zarandia (Georgian: ლუკა ზარანდია; born 17 February 1996) is a Georgian professional footballer who plays as a winger.

== Early life ==
As a child, Zarandia played tennis.

== Club career ==
After starting career in hometown club Locomotive Tbilisi, Zarandia moved to Poland in 2017 and joined Arka Gdynia. He made his debut for the club in April 2017 in the Polish Cup game against Wigry Suwałki.

In July 2019, Zulte Waregem announced the signing of the Zarandia on a three-year agreement.

On 29 March 2022, he joined Polish I liga side Korona Kielce, led by Leszek Ojrzyński with whom he previously worked with at Arka, until the end of the season. He stayed with the team following their promotion to Ekstraklasa before terminating his contract by mutual consent on 2 November 2022, shortly after Ojrzyński's dismissal.

== International ==
He made his debut for Georgia national team on 16 October 2018 in a 2018–19 UEFA Nations League D game against Latvia.

== Honours ==
Arka Gdynia

- Polish Cup: 2016–17
- Polish Super Cup: 2018

Korona Kielce II

- IV liga Świętokrzyskie: 2021–22
