= Bojan Mlađović =

Serbian footballer

Personal information
- Full name: Bojan Mlađović
- Date of birth: 16 October 1995 (age 31)
- Place of birth: Kosovska Mitrovica, FR Yugoslavia
- Height: 1.88 m (6 ft 2 in)
- Positions: Centre-back; left-back

Team information
- Current team: Bukhara
- Number: 30

Youth career
- Trepča
- 2012–2014: Sloga Kraljevo

Senior career*
| Years | Team | Apps | (Gls) |
| 2014–2015 | Trepča | | |
| 2015 | Mokra Gora | 14 | (0) |
| 2016–2017 | Teleoptik | 16 | (0) |
| 2017 | Bačka Palanka | 2 | (0) |
| 2017–2018 | Inđija | 16 | (0) |
| 2018 | Mladost Lučani | 0 | (0) |
| 2018–2021 | Metalac Gornji Milanovac | 42 | (2) |
| 2022 | Radnički Niš | 15 | (1) |
| 2022 | Mladost Novi Sad | 8 | (0) |
| 2023 | Tobol | 18 | (0) |
| 2024 | Dinamo Batumi | 10 | (0) |
| 2025 | Anorthosis Famagusta | 14 | (0) |
| 2026– | Bukhara | 7 | (0) |
- * Club domestic league appearances and goals as of 28 July 2026

Bojan Mlađović (Serbian Cyrillic: Бојан Млађовић; born 16 October 1995) is a Serbian professional footballer who plays as a defender for Uzbekistan Super League club Bukhara.

His previous club was Kazakh side Tobol.

== Club career ==
Born in Kosovska Mitrovica, Mlađović started playing football in local football club Trepča, where he also passed youth categories. He moved to Sloga Kraljevo in 2012, playing for two seasons with the club as a youngster. After he outgrew youth selection, Mlađović returned to his home club Trepča for the 2014–15 season, making his first senior appearances in the Morava Zone League, and Serbian Cup. For the next season, he moved to the Serbian League West side Mokra Gora, but after a half-season, he joined Teleoptik. Playing with Teleoptik, Mlađović collected 16 appearances in the Serbian League Belgrade at total between 2016 and 2017, for a promotion in the Serbian First League. In the summer of 2017 he left Teleoptik and signed with SuperLiga club Bačka. He made his professional debut for the new club against Spartak Subotica on 22 July 2017. On the last day of the summer transfer window 2017, Mlađović moved to the Serbian First League club Inđija.

== Career statistics ==
As of 28 May 2018

Appearances and goals by club, season and competition
| Club | Season | League | | | Cup | | Continental | | Other | | Total | |
| Club | Season | Division | Apps | Goals | Apps | Goals | Apps | Goals | Apps | Goals | Apps | Goals |
|---|---|---|---|---|---|---|---|---|---|---|---|---|
| Trepča | 2014–15 | Morava Zone League | — (Note: No information available) | | 1 (Note: Including first round match against Vojvodina) | 0 | — | | — | | 1 | 0 |
| Mokra Gora | 2015–16 | Serbian League West | 14 | 0 | 2 (Note: Including preliminary round match against Sloga Kraljevo and first round match against Čukarički) | 0 | — | | — | | 16 | 0 |
| Teleoptik | 2015–16 | Serbian League Belgrade | 4 | 0 | — | | — | | — | | 4 | 0 |
| Teleoptik | 2016–17 | Serbian League Belgrade | 12 | 0 | — | | — | | — | | 12 | 0 |
| Teleoptik | Total | | 16 | 0 | — | | — | | — | | 16 | 0 |
| Bačka | 2017–18 | Serbian SuperLiga | 2 | 0 | — | | — | | — | | 2 | 0 |
| Inđija | 2017–18 | Serbian First League | 16 | 0 | 2 | 0 | — | | — | | 18 | 0 |
| Career total | | | 48 | 0 | 5 | 0 | — | | — | | 53 | 0 |

== Honours ==
Teleoptik

- Serbian League Belgrade: 2016–17
