= Pavel Zabelin =

Belarusian footballer

Personal information
- Date of birth: 30 June 1995 (age 31)
- Place of birth: Grodno, Belarus
- Height: 1.95 m (6 ft 5 in)
- Position: Midfielder

Team information
- Current team: Maccabi Kiryat Gat

Youth career
- 2011–2014: Neman Grodno

Senior career*
Years	Team	Apps	(Gls)
2014–2020	Neman Grodno	79	(7)
2016	→ Baranovichi (loan)	13	(4)
2016–2017	→ Granit Mikashevichi (loan)	44	(13)
2021–2023	Shakhtyor Soligorsk	32	(2)
2021	→ Neman Grodno (loan)	14	(2)
2021	→ Andijon (loan)	14	(3)
2023	Tobol	10	(1)
2024–2025	Sokol Saratov	42	(1)
2025–2026	Akritas Chlorakas	27	(1)
2026–	Maccabi Kiryat Gat	0	(0)

International career^{‡}
2015	Belarus U21	1	(0)
2024–	Belarus	13	(1)
- * Club domestic league appearances and goals as of 14 June 2026 ‡ National team caps and goals as of 8 September 2025

Pavel Zabelin (Belarusian: Павел Забелiн; Russian: Павел Забелин; born 30 June 1995) is a Belarusian professional football player who plays as a midfielder for Liga Leumit club Maccabi Kiryat Gat and the Belarus national team.

== Club career ==
On 10 January 2024, Tobol announced that Zabelin had left the club.

On 7 February 2024, Russian First League club Sokol Saratov announced the signing of Zabelin.

== International career ==
Zabelin made his debut for the senior Belarus national team on 26 March 2024 in a friendly against Malta.

== International goals ==
No.	Date	Venue	Opponent	Score	Result	Competition
1.	25 March 2025	Bank Respublika Arena, Masazır, Azerbaijan	Azerbaijan	1–0	2–0	Friendly

== Honours ==
Shakhtyor Soligorsk

- Belarusian Super Cup winner: 2021, 2023
