= Demir Imeri =

Macedonian Albanian footballer (born 1995)

Personal information
- Full name: Demir Imeri
- Date of birth: 27 October 1995 (age 31)
- Place of birth: Kičevo, Macedonia
- Height: 1.75 m (5 ft 9 in)
- Position: Right winger

Team information
- Current team: Enosis Neon Paralimni
- Number: 32

Youth career
- 2010–2011: Vëllazërimi 77

Senior career*
Years	Team	Apps	(Gls)
2012–2013	Rabotnički	21	(2)
2014–2017	Shkëndija	38	(7)
2015–2016	→ Turnovo (loan)	16	(3)
2016–2017	→ Renova (loan)	12	(5)
2017–2018	Kamza	21	(3)
2018	PS Kemi	12	(0)
2019	Mosta	6	(3)
2019–2020	Olimpik Donetsk	8	(1)
2020–2021	Vllaznia Shkodër	33	(4)
2021–2022	Egnatia	33	(1)
2022–2023	Atyrau	35	(5)
2024	Andijon	7	(0)
2024–2025	Shkupi	28	(7)
2025	Rabotnicki	13	(3)
2026–	Enosis Neon Paralimni	13	(1)

International career
2011–2012	Macedonia U17	8	(15)
2012	Macedonia U18	1	(0)
2013	Macedonia U19	4	(3)
2014–2015	Macedonia U21	7	(1)
- * Club domestic league appearances and goals as of 14 June 2026

Demir Imeri (born 27 October 1995) is a Macedonian Albanian footballer who plays for Enosis Neon Paralimni in Cyprus.

== Club career ==
On 30 January 2019, after a short stint in Finnish Veikkausliiga with PS Kemi, Imeri moved to Malta and signed until June 2020 with Mosta FC in the Maltese Premier League.

== Career statistics ==
As of 14 June 2026

Appearances and goals by club, season and competition
Club	Season	League			Cup (Note: Includes Albanian Cup, Maltese FA Trophy, Ukrainian Cup, Kazakhstan Cup, Uzbekistan Cup, Macedonian Cup)		Continental		Total	
Club	Season	Division	Apps	Goals	Apps	Goals	Apps	Goals	Apps	Goals
Rabotnichki	2011–12	Macedonian First League	5	0	0	0	–		5	0
Rabotnichki	2012–13	Macedonian First League	5	0	0	0	–		5	0
Rabotnichki	2013–14	Macedonian First League	11	2	0	0	–		5	0
Rabotnichki	Total		21	2	0	0	0	0	21	2
Shkëndija	2013–14	Macedonian First League	10	1	–		–		10	1
Shkëndija	2014–15	Macedonian First League	21	5	0	0	1 (Note: Appearances in UEFA Europa League)	0	22	5
Shkëndija	2015–16	Macedonian First League	0	0	0	0	0	0	0	0
Shkëndija	2016–17	Macedonian First League	7	1	0	0	2	0	9	1
Shkëndija	Total		38	7	0	0	3	0	41	7
Turnovo (loan)	2015–16	Macedonian First League	16	3	–		–		16	3
Renova (loan)	2015–16	Macedonian First League	12	5	–		–		12	5
Kamza	2017–18	Kategoria Superiore	21	3	2	0	–		23	3
PS Kemi	2018	Veikkausliiga	12	0	0	0	–		12	0
Mosta	2018–19	Maltese Premier League	6	3	1	0	–		7	3
Olimpik Donetsk	2019–20	Ukrainian Premier League	8	1	2	0	–		10	1
Vllaznia Shkodër	2020–21	Kategoria Superiore	33	4	3	3	–		36	7
Egnatia	2021–22	Kategoria Superiore	33	4	6	1	–		39	5
Atyrau	2022	Kazakhstan Premier League	10	3	–		–		10	3
Atyrau	2023	Kazakhstan Premier League	25	2	6	1	–		31	3
Atyrau	Total		35	5	6	1	0	0	41	6
Andijon	2024	Uzbekistan Super League	7	0	3	0	–		10	0
Shkupi	2024–25	Macedonian First League	21	3	1	0	–		22	3
Rabotnicki	2025–26	Macedonian First League	13	3	1	0	–		14	3
Enosis Neon Paralimni	2025–26	Cypriot First Division	13	1	1	0	–		14	1
Career total			299	44	26	5	3	0	328	49
