= Ivan Rogač =

Serbian footballer

Ivan Rogač Иван Рогач
Personal information
- Date of birth: 18 June 1992 (age 34)
- Place of birth: Kotor, FR Yugoslavia
- Height: 1.92 m (6 ft 4 in)
- Position: Centre-back

Team information
- Current team: Kabel Novi Sad
- Number: 15

Youth career
- Ajax Novi Sad
- Red Star Belgrade

Senior career*
Years	Team	Apps	(Gls)
2010	Red Star Belgrade	0	(0)
2010	→ Sopot (loan)	7	(0)
2011–2014	Rad	15	(1)
2013	→ BSK Borča (loan)	13	(1)
2014–2015	Volyn Lutsk	2	(0)
2015	Vojvodina	10	(0)
2015	OFK Beograd	5	(0)
2016–2017	OFK Bačka	27	(0)
2017–2018	Inđija	26	(0)
2018	Zemun	2	(0)
2018–2020	Inđija	55	(2)
2020	Javor	7	(2)
2020–2021	Metalac Gornji Milanovac	34	(0)
2021–2023	Akron Tolyatti	48	(3)
2023	Tobol	16	(0)
2024	Lokomotiv Tashkent	21	(3)
2025	Jedinstvo Ub	24	(0)
2026–	Kabel Novi Sad	12	(0)

International career
2010–2011	Serbia U19	8	(0)
2012–2013	Serbia U20	2	(0)
- * Club domestic league appearances and goals as of 14 May 2025

Ivan Rogač (Serbian Cyrillic: Иван Рогач; born 18 June 1992) is a Serbian football who plays as a centre-back for Kabel Novi Sad.

Born in Kotor, Montenegro, Rogač decided to represent Serbia internationally.
