= Maksim Fedin =

Kazakh footballer

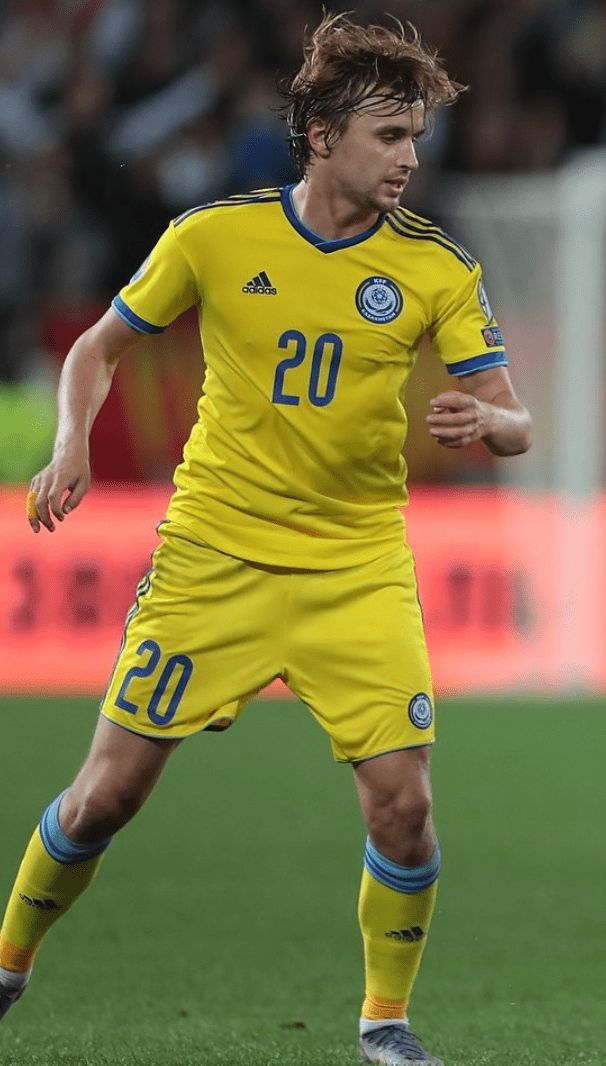

Personal information
- Full name: Maksim Sergeyevich Fedin
- Date of birth: 8 June 1996 (age 30)
- Place of birth: Ekibastuz, Kazakhstan
- Height: 1.67 m (5 ft 5 1/2 in)
- Positions: Attacking midfielder; forward

Team information
- Current team: Irtysh Pavlodar
- Number: 11

Youth career
- Irtysh Pavlodar

Senior career*
Years	Team	Apps	(Gls)
2014	Bayterek	26	(3)
2015–2016	Spartak Subotica	5	(0)
2016	Atyrau	13	(1)
2017	Okzhetpes	26	(2)
2018–2021	Tobol	61	(7)
2020	→ Kaisar (loan)	15	(1)
2021	Aktobe	24	(2)
2022	Turan	6	(0)
2022–2024	Ordabasy	43	(3)
2025–	Irtysh Pavlodar	22	(4)

International career^{‡}
2012	Kazakhstan U17	6	(1)
2014	Kazakhstan U19	3	(0)
2015–2019	Kazakhstan U21	16	(2)
2018–	Kazakhstan	18	(1)
- * Club domestic league appearances and goals as of 2 July 2026 ‡ National team caps and goals as of 17 April 2023

Maksim Sergeyevich Fedin (Russian: Максим Сергеевич Федин; born 8 June 1996) is a Kazakh professional footballer who plays as a midfielder for Irtysh Pavlodar.

== Club career ==
=== Bayterek Astana ===
Fedin passed the youth school of Irtysh Pavlodar. For the 2014 season, he made 26 appearances and scored 3 goals, playing with Bayterek.

=== Spartak Subotica ===
Fedin joined Spartak Subotica in January 2015, but he could not playing until the end of 2014–15 season, because of injury. He made his SuperLiga debut in the 7th fixture of 2015–16 season, against Metalac.

=== Atyrau ===
On 9 July 2016, Fedin signed for Kazakhstan Premier League side FC Atyrau.

=== Okzhetpes ===
On 12 January 2017, Fedin signed a one-year contract with FC Okzhetpes.

=== Tobol ===
On 25 December 2018, FC Tobol announced the signing of Fedin, with Fedin extending his contract with Tobol until the end of 2020 on 31 December 2019.

On 4 April 2020, Fedin joined FC Kaisar on loan for the remainder of the 2020 season.

=== Turan ===
In January 2022, Fedin joined Turan, before leaving by mutual agreement in June 2022.

=== Ordabasy ===
On 15 July 2022, Ordabasy announced the signing of Fedin.

== International career ==
Fedin was a regular member of all youth sections of the Kazakh national team, namely the U17, U19 and U21. On June 10, 2017, he was part of the Kazakhstan national team in a qualifying game for the 2018 FIFA World Cup against Denmark, but ended being an unused substitute. He received a new call for the friendly game against Azerbaijan played on June 5, 2018, but again failed to debut. He made his debut for the senior squad on 13 October 2018 in a 2018–19 UEFA Nations League D game against Latvia.

== Career statistics ==
=== Club ===
As of match played 19 June 2022

Appearances and goals by club, season and competition
Club	Season	League			National Cup		Continental		Other		Total	
Club	Season	Division	Apps	Goals	Apps	Goals	Apps	Goals	Apps	Goals	Apps	Goals
Spartak Subotica	2015–16	Serbian SuperLiga	5	0	1	0	–		–		6	0
Atyrau	2016	Kazakhstan Premier League	13	1	2	0	–		–		15	1
Okzhetpes	2017	Kazakhstan Premier League	26	2	2	1	–		–		28	3
Tobol	2018	Kazakhstan Premier League	28	2	2	0	4	2	–		34	4
Tobol	2019	Kazakhstan Premier League	33	5	4	2	2	0	–		39	7
Tobol	2020	Kazakhstan Premier League	0	0	0	0	0	0	–		0	0
Tobol	Total		61	7	6	2	6	2	-	-	73	11
Kaisar (loan)	2020	Kazakhstan Premier League	15	1	0	0	1	0	0	0	16	1
Aktobe	2021	Kazakhstan Premier League	24	2	4	0	–		–		28	2
Turan	2022	Kazakhstan Premier League	6	0	0	0	–		–		6	0
Career total			150	13	15	3	7	2	0	0	172	18

=== International ===
Kazakhstan national team
Year	Apps	Goals
2018	4	0
2019	8	1
2020	4	0
2021	1	0
Total	17	1

Statistics accurate as of match played 28 March 2021

Scores and results list Kazakhstan's goal tally first.

No.	Date	Venue	Opponent	Score	Result	Competition
1.	11 June 2019	Astana Arena, Nur-Sultan, Kazakhstan	San Marino	2–0	4–0	UEFA Euro 2020 qualification

== Personal life ==
In June 2022, it became known that Fedin had converted to Islam. On social media, he posted a photo from a mosque with the caption: “Alhamdulillah.”
