= Serikzhan Muzhikov =

Kazakhstani footballer

Personal information
- Full name: Serikzhan Urstemuly Muzhikov
- Date of birth: 17 June 1989 (age 37)
- Place of birth: Taldykorgan, Kazakh SSR, Soviet Union
- Height: 1.75 m (5 ft 9 in)
- Position: Midfielder

Team information
- Current team: Zhetysu
- Number: 7

Youth career
- Zhetysu

Senior career*
Years	Team	Apps	(Gls)
2006–2007	Koksu	9	(1)
2008–2013	Zhetysu	130	(12)
2014	Astana	17	(1)
2015	Kaysar	17	(0)
2015–2019	Astana	107	(15)
2020–2024	Tobol	72	(9)
2024–2025	Zhetysu	22	(5)
2025	Yelimay	12	(0)
2025	Okzhetpes	8	(0)
2026–	Zhetysu	26	(2)

International career^{‡}
2009	Kazakhstan U21	2	(0)
2011–	Kazakhstan	31	(2)
- * Club domestic league appearances and goals as of 1 November 2026 ‡ National team caps and goals as of 7 September 2025

Serikzhan Urstemuly Muzhikov (Kazakh: Серікжан Урстемұлы Мұжықов, romanized: Serıkjan Urstemūly Mūjyqov; born 17 June 1989) is a Kazakhstan international football player who plays for Zhetysu in the Kazakhstan Premier League.

== Career ==
Muzhikov began his career in 2006 with FC Koksu. He has been playing for FC Zhetysu since 2008.

In July 2015, Muzhikov returned to FC Astana, signing an eighteen-month contract. On 6 January 2020, Muzhikov left Astana at the end of his contract. On 22 January 2020, FC Tobol announced the signing of Muzhikov on a one-year contract.

== Career statistics ==
=== Club ===
As of Match played 10 November 2019

Appearances and goals by club, season and competition
Club	Season	League			National Cup		Continental		Other		Total	
Club	Season	Division	Apps	Goals	Apps	Goals	Apps	Goals	Apps	Goals	Apps	Goals
Zhetysu	2008	Kazakhstan Premier League	12	0			-		-		12	0
Zhetysu	2009	Kazakhstan Premier League	24	0			-		-		24	0
Zhetysu	2010	Kazakhstan Premier League	29	6			-		-		29	6
Zhetysu	2011	Kazakhstan Premier League	27	5			-		-		27	5
Zhetysu	2012	Kazakhstan Premier League	18	1	2	1	2	1	-		22	3
Zhetysu	2013	Kazakhstan Premier League	20	0	0	0	-		-		20	0
Zhetysu	Total		130	12	2	1	2	1	-	-	134	14
Astana	2014	Kazakhstan Premier League	17	1	3	0	6	0	-		26	1
Kaisar	2015	Kazakhstan Premier League	17	0	2	0	-		-		19	0
Astana	2015	Kazakhstan Premier League	9	1	2	0	7	0	0	0	18	1
Astana	2016	Kazakhstan Premier League	27	3	4	0	12	0	1	0	44	3
Astana	2017	Kazakhstan Premier League	29	6	0	0	12	1	1	0	42	7
Astana	2018	Kazakhstan Premier League	21	3	0	0	13	1	1	0	34	4
Astana	2019	Kazakhstan Premier League	18	2	1	1	4	0	0	0	23	3
Astana	Total		104	15	7	1	48	2	3	0	162	14
Career total			268	28	14	2	56	3	3	0	341	29

=== International ===
Kazakhstan
Year	Apps	Goals
2011	4	0
2012	1	0
2013	0	0
2014	0	0
2015	0	0
2016	7	0
2017	3	0
2018	6	1
2019	2	0
2021	3	1
2025	5	0
Total	31	2

Statistics accurate as of match played 7 September 2025

=== International goals ===
Scores and results list Kazakhstan's goal tally first.

No.	Date	Venue	Opponent	Score	Result	Competition
1.	5 June 2018	Astana Arena, Astana, Kazakhstan	Azerbaijan	2–0	3–0	Friendly
2.	31 March 2021	NSK Olimpiyskiy, Kyiv, Ukraine	Ukraine	1–1	1–1	2022 FIFA World Cup qualification
