= Samat Zharynbetov =

Kazakhstani footballer

Personal information
- Full name: Samat Zhanatuly Zharynbetov
- Date of birth: 4 January 1994 (age 32)
- Place of birth: Ekibastuz, Kazakhstan
- Height: 1.74 m (5 ft 9 in)
- Position: Midfielder

Team information
- Current team: Zhenis
- Number: 29

Senior career*
Years	Team	Apps	(Gls)
2011–2016	Ekibastuz	140	(7)
2017–2023	Tobol	125	(4)
2024–2025	Ordabasy	8	(0)
2025–2026	Kyzylzhar	21	(2)
2026	Irtysh	16	(0)
2026–	Zhenis	11	(0)

International career^{‡}
2021–	Kazakhstan	7	(0)
- * Club domestic league appearances and goals as of 1 November 2026 ‡ National team caps and goals as of 17 April 2023

Samat Zhanatuly Zharynbetov (Kazakh: Самат Жанатұлы Жарынбетов, Samat Janatūly Jarynbetov; born 4 January 1994) is a Kazakhstani professional footballer who plays for Kazakhstan Premier League club Zhenis.

== Career ==
Zharynbetov is a midfielder who made his debut for the Kazakhstan national football team on 4th September 2021 in a World Cup qualifier against Finland, a 0–1 away loss. He substituted Georgy Zhukov in the 81st minute.
