= Kostanay Central Stadium =

Football stadium in Kostanay, Kazakhstan

Coordinates: 53°13′34″N 63°38′12″E

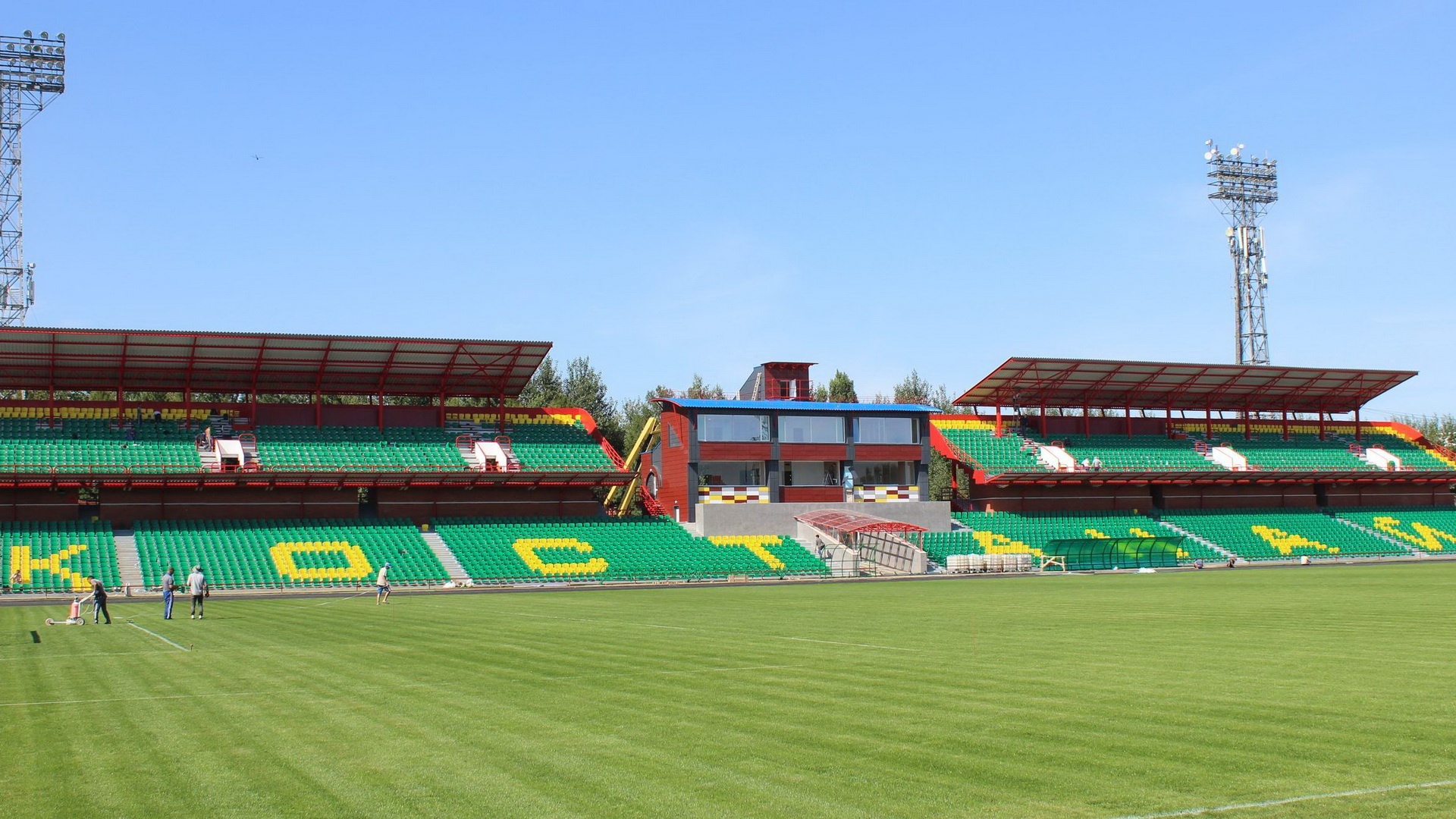
- Interactive map of Kostanay Central Stadium
- Location: Kostanay, Kazakhstan
- Owner: Municipality of Kostanay
- Capacity: 9,500
- Surface: Grass
- Record attendance: 8,420 (FC Tobol-FC Basel, 03 August 2023
- Field size: 105x68

Construction
- Opened: 1964
- Renovated: 2002, 2017

Tenant
- FC Tobol

Kostanay Central Stadium is a multi-purpose stadium in Kostanay, Kazakhstan. It is currently used mostly for football matches and is the home stadium of FC Tobol.

== History ==
The soccer arena has been in operation since 1964. The first match was played on May 11, 1967. In 2002 German technology was applied to renew the surface of the soccer field and an automatic irrigation system was installed. For electric lighting, the main arena was equipped with four special poles. In order to meet UEFA standards, the stadium was equipped with special lighting in 2008. Now the lamps have 1200 lux, instead of 200 lux. In 2017, the stadium was completely renovated. The capacity of the seats was increased from 8,320 to 9,500 and the east stand was completely rebuilt.

== Features ==
The central stadium holds 9,500 people. The size of the playing field is 105x68 meters and is illuminated with 1200 lux. There are two grandstands; the west grandstand and the east grandstand.

The ticket price for the 1st level East and West grandstands is 300 KZT, while the price for the 2nd level West grandstand is 500 KZT.
