= Karasai Stadium =

Stadium in Petropavl, Kazakhstan

Coordinates: 54°52′27″N 69°09′07″E

- Interactive map of Karasai Stadium
- Location: Petropavl, Kazakhstan
- Owner: Municipality of Petropavl
- Capacity: 11,000
- Surface: Grass; 110m x 68m

Construction
- Opened: 1967

Tenant
- FC Kyzylzhar

Karasai Stadium (Kazakh: Қарасай стадионы, Karasaı stadıony), previously known as Avangard Stadium, is a multi-use stadium in Petropavl, Kazakhstan. It is currently used mostly for football matches and is the home stadium of FC Kyzylzhar.
