= Aleksandr Marochkin =

Kazakhstani footballer

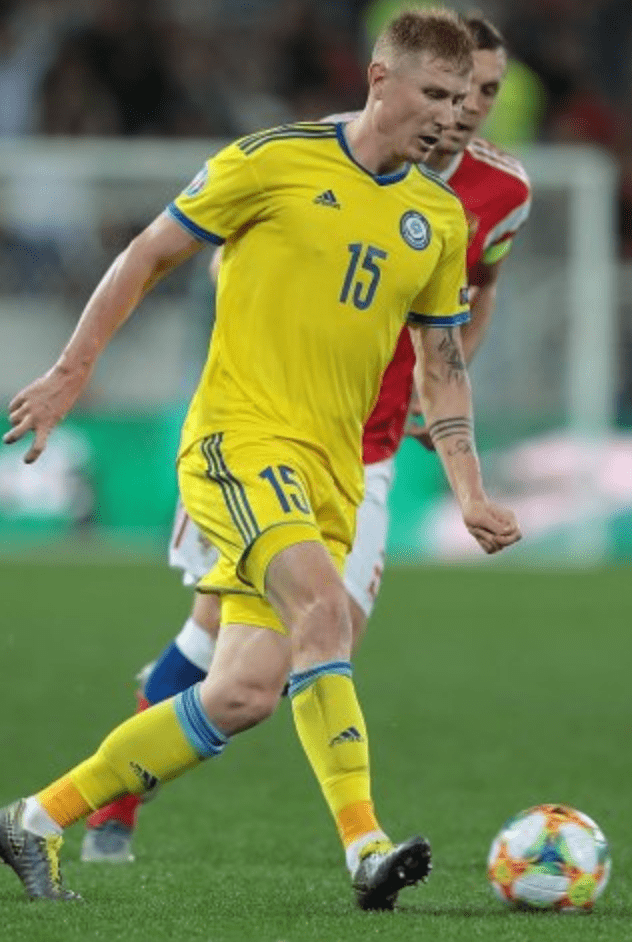
- Marochkin playing with the Kazakhstan national football team

Personal information
- Full name: Aleksandr Nikolayevich Marochkin
- Date of birth: 14 July 1990 (age 36)
- Place of birth: Arkalyk, Kazakh SSR, Soviet Union
- Height: 1.90 m (6 ft 3 in)
- Position: Defender

Team information
- Current team: Tobol
- Number: 22

Senior career*
Years	Team	Apps	(Gls)
2012–2013	Ile-Saulet	42	(5)
2014–2015	Caspiy	22	(1)
2015	Okzhetpes	9	(0)
2016	Kaisar	18	(1)
2017	Okzhetpes	29	(3)
2018–2019	Kaisar	50	(3)
2019–2023	Tobol	57	(1)
2020	→ Kaisar (loan)	19	(1)
2023–2025	Astana	39	(1)
2026–	Tobol	15	(1)

International career^{‡}
2019–	Kazakhstan	52	(1)
- * Club domestic league appearances and goals as of 1 November 2026 ‡ National team caps and goals as of 25 March 2025

Aleksandr Nikolayevich Marochkin (Russian: Александр Николаевич Марочкин; born 14 July 1990) is a Kazakhstani professional footballer who plays for Tobol.

== Club career ==
He made his Kazakhstan Premier League debut for FC Okzhetpes on 11 March 2015 in a game against FC Kaisar.

On 16 December 2019, FC Tobol announced the signing of Marochkin, before announcing his return to FC Kaisar on loan for the 2020 season on 16 February 2020.

On 11 July 2023, Astana announced the signing of Marochkin from Tobol.

== International ==
He made his Kazakhstan national football team debut on 8 June 2019 in a Euro 2020 qualifier against Belgium, as a starter.

On 25 March 2025, during a 2026 FIFA World Cup qualification 2-0 away win against Liechtenstein, he scored his first goal with Kazakhstan, becoming at 34 years and 8 months his country’s oldest goalscorer in a FIFA World Cup qualification game.

=== International statistics ===
As of match played 25 March 2025

Kazakhstan
Year	Apps	Goals
2019	7	0
2020	6	0
2021	7	0
2022	10	0
2023	10	0
2024	9	0
2025	3	1
Total	52	1

As of match played 25 March 2025. Kazakhstan score listed first, score column indicates score after each Marochkin goal.

International goals by date, venue, cap, opponent, score, result and competition
No.	Date	Venue	Cap	Opponent	Score	Result	Competition
1	25 March 2025	Rheinpark Stadion, Vaduz, Liechtenstein	52	Liechtenstein	2–0	2–0	2026 FIFA World Cup qualification
