= 2019 Uzbekistan League Cup =

Football competition

The 2019 Uzbekistan League Cup was the 7th season of the annual Uzbekistan League Cup, the knockout football cup competition of Uzbekistan.

== Group stage ==
=== Group A ===
Pos	Team	Pld	W	D	L	GF	GA	GD	Pts	Qualification
1	Shurtan	3	2	1	0	0	0	0	7	Knockout stage
2	Dinamo Samarqand	3	2	0	1	0	0	0	6	Knockout stage
3	Sogdiana	3	1	1	1	0	0	0	4	
4	Surkhon	3	0	0	3	0	0	0	0	

Updated to match(es) played on unknown. Source: Forza Football

=== Group B ===
Pos	Team	Pld	W	D	L	GF	GA	GD	Pts	Qualification
1	FK Kokand 1912	3	3	0	0	0	0	0	9	Knockout stage
2	Pakhtakor	3	2	0	1	0	0	0	6	Knockout stage
3	Lokomotiv	3	1	0	2	0	0	0	3	
4	Bukhoro	3	0	0	3	0	0	0	0	

Updated to match(es) played on unknown. Source: Forza Football

=== Group C ===
Pos	Team	Pld	W	D	L	GF	GA	GD	Pts	Qualification
1	AGMK	3	2	1	0	0	0	0	7	Knockout stage
2	Metallurg	3	1	1	1	0	0	0	4	Knockout stage
3	Bunyodkor	3	1	0	2	0	0	0	3	
4	Qizilqum	3	1	0	2	0	0	0	3	

Updated to match(es) played on unknown. Source: Forza Football

=== Group D ===
Pos	Team	Pld	W	D	L	GF	GA	GD	Pts	Qualification
1	Andijon	3	3	0	0	0	0	0	9	Knockout stage
2	Nasaf	3	2	0	1	0	0	0	6	Knockout stage
3	Navbahor	3	1	0	2	0	0	0	3	
4	Mash'al	3	0	0	3	0	0	0	0	

Updated to match(es) played on unknown. Source: Forza Football
