= Yevgeni Matveyev =

Russian footballer

Personal information
- Date of birth: 23 August 1966 (age 60)
- Height: 1.76 m (5 ft 9 1/2 in)
- Positions: Forward; midfielder

Senior career*
Years	Team	Apps	(Gls)
1983–1984	FC Neftyanik Fergana	52	(6)
1985–1986	did not play		
1987	FC Neftyanik Fergana	2	(1)
1988	FC Avtomobilchi Kokand	15	(0)
1989	FC Neftyanik Fergana	39	(17)
1990	FC Avtomobilchi Kokand	21	(10)
1990	FC Neftyanik Fergana	16	(1)
1991	FC Avtomobilchi Kokand	18	(4)
1991	FC Druzhba Budyonnovsk	21	(7)
1992–1993	Neftchi FK (Fergana)	38	(7)
1994	FC Spartak Anapa	8	(1)
1994–1995	FC Lokomotiv Nizhny Novgorod	4	(0)
1995	FK Atlaschi	3	(0)
1996	FK Dinamo Urganch	11	(3)
- * Club domestic league appearances and goals

Yevgeni Matveyev (Russian: Евгений Матвеев; born 23 August 1966) is a former Russian football player.

== Honours ==
Neftchi FK Fergana

- Uzbek League champion: 1992, 1993
