= Ikramov =

Ikramov (feminine: Ikramova) is an Uzbek surname. Notable people with the surname include:

- Adkham Ikramov (born 1968), Uzbek politician
- Akmal Ikramov (1898–1938), Uzbek Soviet politician
- Sarvar Ikramov (born 1995), Uzbek tennis player
- Surat Ikramov (1945–2021), Uzbek activist
