= Uzbekistan Futsal Federation =

Uzbek national Futsal organization

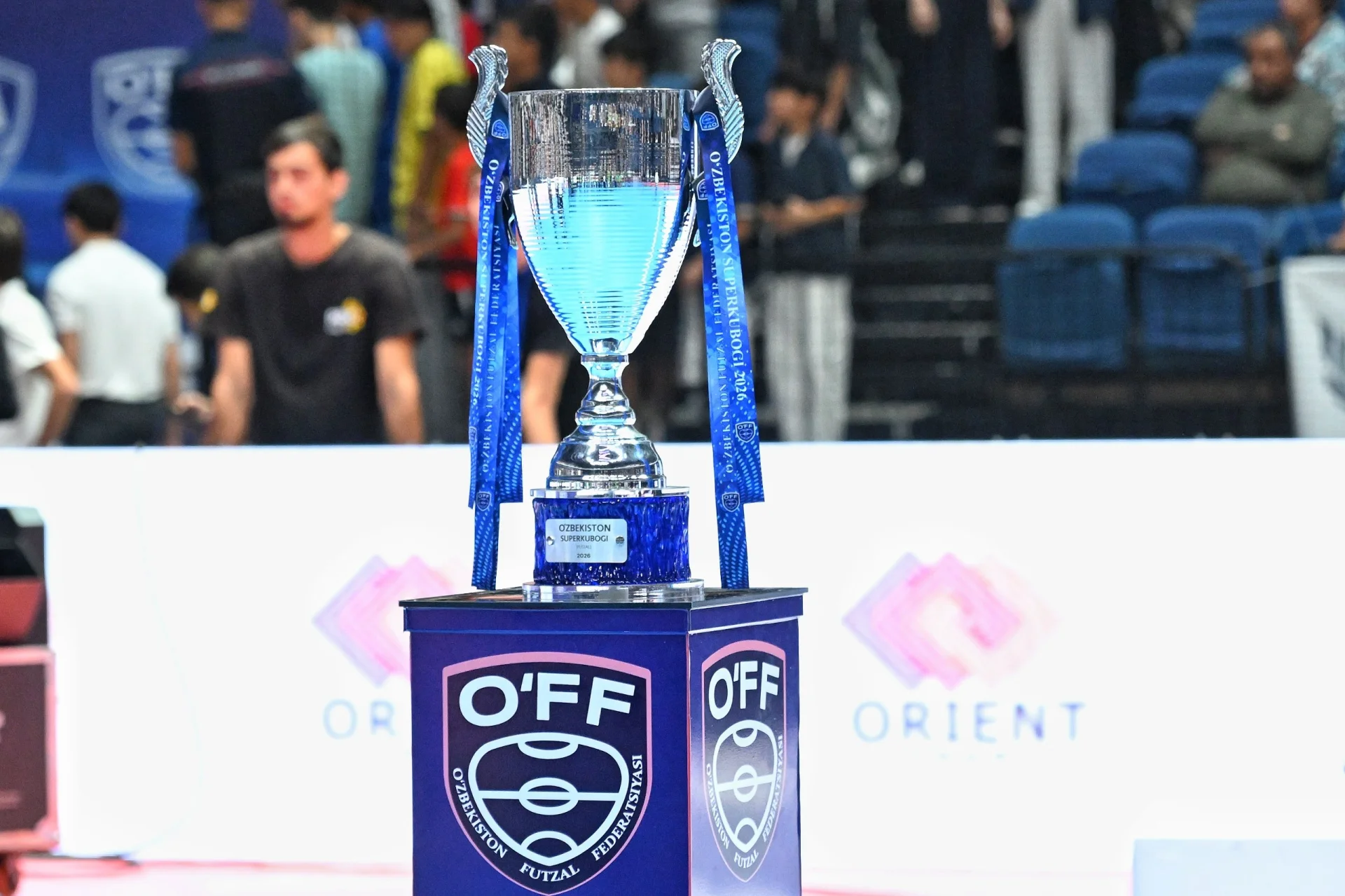
- Abbreviation: UFF
- Formation: December 25, 2024; 21 months ago 2001—2002 – Uzbekistan Mini-Football (Futsal) Federation; 2004—2017 – Uzbekistan Futsal Federation; 2017—2025 – Uzbekistan Futsal Association
- Type: NGO
- Legal status: Working
- Headquarters: 14-b, Small ring road, Armugon, Yakkasaray, Tashkent, Uzbekistan
- Region served: Uzbekistan
- President: Bekzod Mamatkulov
- Vice President: Aziz Akbarjonov
- Secretary General: Maʼrufjon Abdullayev
- Main organ: Federation
- Parent organization: Uzbekistan Football Association; Uzbekistan Professional Football League
- Website: futsal.uz

Uzbekistan Futsal Federation (Uzbek: Ўзбекистон футзал федерацияси) is the organization that oversees and manages futsal in Uzbekistan. It organizes national championships, cups and other competitions; manages the women's and men's national teams; supports, develops, promotes mini-football and beach soccer.

== History ==
From 2001 to 2002, it operated as the Uzbekistan Mini-Football Federation, from 2004 to 2017 as the Uzbekistan Futsal Federation, from 2017 to 2025 as Uzbekistan Futsal Association under the Football Association. On January 1, 2025, it was reorganized into Uzbekistan Futsal Federation and began operating as a separate organization from the Football Association.

Futsal competitions in Uzbekistan (Higher League, Cup, etc.) were carried out by Uzbekistan Professional Football League from 2017 to 2025.

== Goals and objectives ==
Holding mini-football (futsal) sports competitions; popularize and promote mini-football (futsal) and beach soccer, protect its interests and values; improving the skills of football players, coaches, referees and futsal specialists; support the information, scientific, methodological and technical base of futsal; support for association members, futsal veterans, players, coaches, referees, and individuals whose activities are related to futsal.

== Leadership ==
Lawyer and entrepreneur Bekzod Mamatkulov was elected the chairperson of Uzbekistan Futsal Federation on December 25, 2024.

== Competitions ==
=== Uzbekistan Futsal League ===
The main division of Uzbekistan Futsal tournaments. The country's strongest futsal teams participate in it. Helds since 2007..

=== Uzbekistan Futsal Cup ===
The Uzbekistan Futsal Cup is an annual competition involving teams from Futsal Higher League and the Futsal First League..

=== Uzbekistan Futsal First League ===
The First Futsal League is a competition among professional and semi-professional futsal teams. Clubs compete in the First Futsal League to earn a place in the Higher League.
