= Uzbek SSR Football Championship =

Uzbek SSR Championship
- Organising body: Football Federation of USSR and Football Federation of Uzbek SSR
- Founded: 1926
- Folded: 1991
- Country: (Soviet Union) USSR; Uzbek SSR
- Confederation: UEFA
- Divisions: 1
- Level on pyramid: 1 (In Uzbek SSR); 4 (In USSR)
- Promotion to: USSR Second League B
- Relegation to: Regional, district and city Championships of the Uzbek SSR
- League cup(s): Uzbek SSR Cup
- Most championships: Tashkent Team (8)

Football Championship of the Uzbek SSR (Uzbek: Футбол бўйича Ўзбекистон ССР чемпионати; Russian: Чемпионат Узбекской ССР по футболу) — football tournament, reveals the strongest amateur football team of the Uzbek SSR which was part of the Soviet Union (USSR). Was played from 1926 to 1991. In the football league system of the USSR had the status of competition of collectives of physical culture.

== History ==
From 1926 to 1936 was carried out as the «Championship of the cities of Uzbek SSR», and only in 1937 as the «Championship of the Uzbek SSR».

The most powerful football clubs, as well as semi-professional and professional clubs of the Uzbek SSR participated in the Championships of the USSR (Higher League, First League, Second League and Second League B).

The winners of the Uzbek SSR Championship was qualified in the Second League B, and the team took the last place was eliminated in the regional, district or city Championships of the Uzbek SSR.

The successor of the Uzbek SSR Championship is the Championship of Uzbekistan, which has been conducted since 1992, after the independence of Uzbekistan.

== Champions ==
=== Championship of the cities of Uzbek SSR ===
Uzbek: Өzbəkiston SSR şaharlari çempionati
Russian: Чемпионат городов Узбекской ССР

Year	Champions
1926	Tashkent City Team
1927	Tashkent City Team
1928	Ferghana City Team
1929	Tashkent City Team
1930	Tashkent City Team
1931	The championship was not held for unknown reasons
1932	The championship was not held for unknown reasons
1933	Tashkent City Team
1934	Tashkent City Team
1935	Tashkent City Team
1936	Tashkent City Team

=== Uzbek SSR Championship ===
Uzbek: Ўзбекистон ССР чемпионати
Russian: Чемпионат Узбекской ССР

Year	Champions
1937	FC Spartak Tashkent
1938	FC Spartak Tashkent
1939	Dinamo Tashkent
1940	The Championship was not held because of the World War II and the difficult economic situation in the USSR
1941	The Championship was not held because of the World War II and the difficult economic situation in the USSR
1942	The Championship was not held because of the World War II and the difficult economic situation in the USSR
1943	The Championship was not held because of the World War II and the difficult economic situation in the USSR
1944	The Championship was not held because of the World War II and the difficult economic situation in the USSR
1945	The Championship was not held because of the World War II and the difficult economic situation in the USSR
1946	The championship was not held due to the difficult economic situation in the USSR
1947	The championship was not held due to the difficult economic situation in the USSR
1948	Polyarnaya Zvezda Tashkent
1949	Dinamo Tashkent
1950	FC Spartak Tashkent
1951	FC Spartak Tashkent
1952	Dinamo Tashkent
1953	FSHM Tashkent
1954	Dinamo Tashkent
1955	ODO Tashkent
1956	ODO Tashkent
1957	Mashstroy Tashkent
1958	Khimik Tashkent
1959	Mehnat Tashkent
1960	Sokol Tashkent
1961	Sokol Tashkent
1962	Sokol Tashkent
1963	Sokol Tashkent
1964	Sokol Tashkent
1965	Sokol Tashkent
1966	Zvezda Tashkent
1967	Tashavtomash Tashkent
1968	Chust
1969	Tashkabel Tashkent
1970	SKA Tashkent
1971	Yangiariq Khanqa
1972	Trud Jizzakh
1973	Spartak Samarkand
1974	Pakhtakor Gulistan
1975	Zarafshan Navoi
1976	Traktor Tashkent
1977	Khiva
1978	Khorezm Baghat
1979	Hisar Shahrisabz
1980	The championship was not held for unknown reasons. Possible cause — mourning in connection with the aircrash of a football club Pakhtakor Tashkent in 1979.
1981	Ekipress Samarkand
1982	Beshkent
1983	Tselinnik Turtkul
1984	Khorezm Khanqa
1985	Shakhtyor Angren
1986	Traktor Tashkent
1987	Avtomobilist Kokand
1988	Selmashovets Chirchiq
1989	Nurafshan Bukhara
1990	Norin Haqqulabad
1991	Politotdel Dustlik

== Champions ==
Club	Trophies	Years won
Tashkent City Team	10	1926, 1927, 1928, 1929, 1930, 1933, 1934, 1935, 1936, 1949
Sokol Tashkent	6	1960, 1961, 1962, 1963, 1964, 1965
Spartak Tashkent	4	1937, 1938, 1950, 1951
Dinamo Tashkent	3	1939, 1952, 1954
Sverdlovets Tashkent (includes ODO & SKA)	3	1955, 1956, 1970
Traktor Tashkent	3	1967, 1976, 1986
Polyarnaya Zvezda Tashkent	1	1948
FShM Tashkent	1	1953
Mashinostroitel Tashkent	1	1957
Khimik Chirchik	1	1958
Mekhnat Tashkent	1	1959
Zvezda Tashkent	1	1966
Chust Pakhtakor	1	1968
Tashkabel Tashkent	1	1969
Xonqa (as Yangiaryk)	1	1971
Sogdiana Jizzakh	1	1972
Dinamo Samarqand	1	1973
Guliston	1	1974
Zarafshan Navoi	1	1975
Khiva	1	1977
Narimanovets (as Khorazm)	1	1978
Khisar Shakhrisabz	1	1979
Ekipress Samarkand	1	1981
Beshkent	1	1982
Oq Oltin Turtkul (as Tselinnik Turtkul)	1	1983
Khorazm Khanki	1	1984
Konchi Angren (as Shakhtyor Angren)	1	1985
Kokand 1912	1	1987
Selmashevets Chirchik	1	1988
Bukhara	1	1989
Naryn Khakulabad	1	1990
Dustlik	1	1991
