= Uzbekistan League Cup =

- Organiser(s): Uzbekistan Football Association
- Founded: 2010; 16 years ago
- Region: Uzbekistan; Tajikistan; Kyrgyzstan
- Teams: 32
- Current champions: Pakhtakor Tashkent (1st title) (2019)
- Most championships: Sogdiana Jizzakh (2 titles)
- 2022 Uzbekistan League Cup

The Uzbekistan League Cup is an annual knockout football competition in men's domestic Uzbek football. Organised by the Uzbekistan Professional Football League Organization and Uzbekistan Football Association since 2010, though the tournament was not held between 2016 and 2018.

== History ==
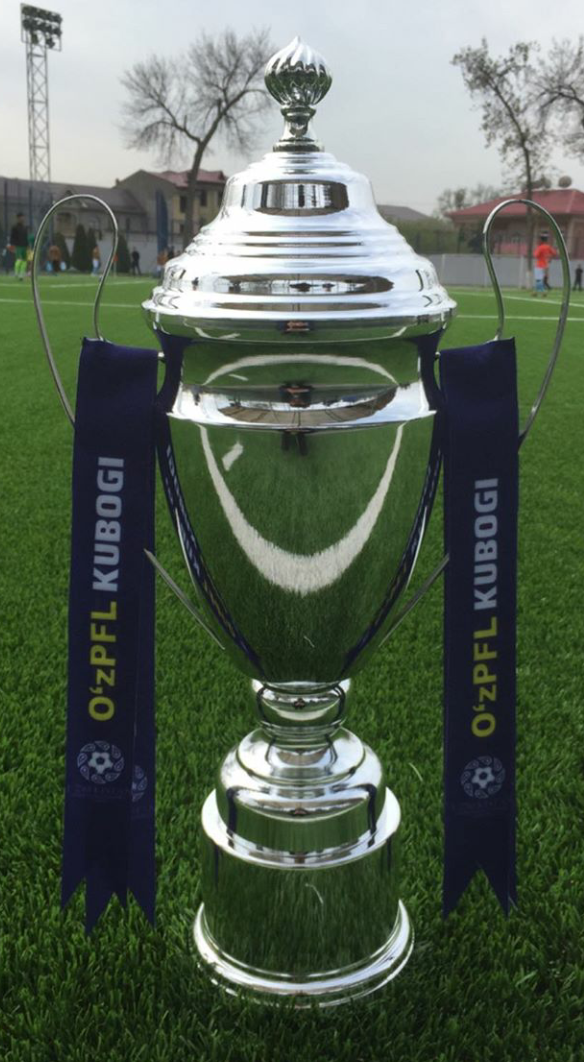

Traditional the cup was held during January and February, in anticipation of the new season of the Uzbek league season, giving many clubs that don't hold training camps abroad the opportunity to conduct pre-season training.

On 26 February 2019, the Uzbekistan Football Association announced the rival of the Uzbekistan League Cup, with 14 Uzbekistan Super League clubs and 2 Uzbekistan Pro League clubs entering. On 10 May 2019, the four groups where announced.

In 2020, Kyrgyz Premier League clubs Dordoi Bishkek, Alay Osh, Abdysh-Ata Kant and Kaganat accepted an invitation to take part in the League Cup, whilst Khujand, Regar-TadAZ, Kuktosh Rudaki and Istaravshan all accepted invitations on behalf of the Tajikistan Higher League.

=== Finals ===
Season	Winner	Runner-up	Stadium	Attendance	Score
2010	Xorazm	Bunyodkor			2–1
2011	Sogdiana Jizzakh	Lokomotiv Tashkent			1–1 (4–3 pen.)
2012	Sogdiana Jizzakh	AGMK			3–1 a.e.t.
2013	AGMK	Pakhtakor-2			3–0
2014	Mash'al Mubarek	Obod			3–1
2015	Shortan Guzor	Mash'al Mubarek			2–2 (4–2 pen.)
2019	Pakhtakor Tashkent	AGMK	Pakhtakor Central Stadium	1,152	6–2
2020					
2021					
2022					
2023					
2024					
2025					

== Results by club ==
Uzbekistan League Cup winners by club
Team	Winners	Runners-up	Years won	Years lost
Sogdiana Jizzakh	2	0	2011, 2012	–
AGMK	1	2	2013	2012, 2019
Mash'al Mubarek	1	1	2014	2015
Xorazm	1	0	2010	–
Shurtan Guzar	1	0	2015	–
Pakhtakor Tashkent	1	0	2019	–
Bunyodkor	0	1	–	2010
Lokomotiv Tashkent	0	1	–	2011
Pakhtakor-2	0	1	–	2013
Obod	0	1	–	2014
