= FIFPro Uzbekistan =

Football union

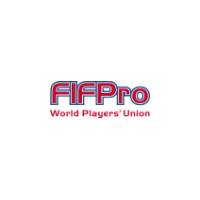
- Formation: 2018
- Established: November 28, 2024; 23 months ago
- Type: NGO
- Location: 47a, Bunyodkor street, Tashkent
- Official language: Uzbek, Russian, English
- Leader: Kamoliddin Murzoev
- Parent organization: Uzbekistan Professional Football League; Uzbekistan Football Association
- Website: futbolchilar.uz

Uzbekistan Footballers Union (Uzbek: Oʻzbekiston futbolchilar uyushmasi, Ўзбекистон футболчилар уюшмаси) is a representative of FIFPro in Uzbekistan.

== History ==
The international organization FIFPro was founded in 1965. Today, 65 national players' associations are members. Uzbekistan has also been a member since 2017. It was registered by the Ministry of Justice of the Republic of Uzbekistan in 2018 and began its official activities as an observer under FIFPro.

It was a candidate member of FIFPro in 2020 and a full member of the organization on November 28, 2024.

== Purpose ==
The main tasks of the association are to protect the rights of players and ensure their health, to provide practical assistance to players who have completed their careers in the future, and to train strong and qualified personnel from among the players. Every action of the association is monitored by FIFPro. FIFPro members who fail to fulfill the requirements and tasks set on time and fail to submit their annual reports are expelled from the organization. The association is financed through the FIFPro Solidarity program. It also invests through donations, advertising and membership fees.

Kamoliddin Murzoev serves as the head of the organization.
