= 1992 Uzbek League =

Uzbek League
- Season: 1992
- Champions: Pakhtakor Tashkent; Neftchi Farg'ona
- Relegated: Shahrixonchi Shahrixon; Kimyogar Olmaliq; Surkhon Termez
- Top goalscorer: Valeriy Kechinov FC Pakhtakor Tashkent (22 goals)

The 1992 Uzbek League season was the first edition of top level football in Uzbekistan since independence from the Soviet Union in 1992. 17 teams took part in the championship which was won by both Pakhtakor Tashkent and Neftchi Farg'ona whom finished the championship on 51 points and therefore shared the first ever Uzbek League title.

Pakhtakor Tashkent were also put forward to enter the first Commonwealth of Independent States Cup as league champions for the 1993 campaign.

Shahrixonchi Shahrixon, Kimyogar Olmaliq and Surkhon Termez were relegated

== Teams ==
The League was contested by 17 teams, three of whom would be relegated.

== League standings ==
Pos	Team	Pld	W	D	L	GF	GA	GD	Pts	Qualification or relegation
1	Pakhtakor Tashkent (C)	32	24	3	5	94	40	+54	51	Co-champion, qualified for the 1993 Commonwealth of Independent States Cup
2	Neftchi Farg'ona (C)	32	23	5	4	66	14	+52	51	Co-champion
3	Sogdiana Jizzakh	32	23	2	7	78	27	+51	48	
4	Nurafshon Buxoro	32	20	7	5	59	23	+36	47	
5	Navbahor Namangan	32	18	8	6	54	21	+33	44	
6	Temiryo'lchi Qo'qon	32	18	7	7	47	28	+19	43	
7	Navro'z Andijan	32	12	9	11	45	45	0	33	
8	Kosonsoychi Kosonsoy	32	12	8	12	35	40	−5	32	
9	Traktor Tashkent	32	11	5	16	40	49	−9	27	
10	Maroqand Samarqand	32	8	10	14	29	46	−17	26	
11	Pakhtakor-79 Tashkent	32	9	7	16	38	58	−20	25	
12	Chirchiq	32	7	11	14	35	54	−19	25	
13	Yangiyer	32	9	4	19	40	64	−24	22	
14	Aral Nukus	32	9	4	19	28	50	−22	22	
15	Shahrixonchi Shahrixon (R)	32	7	7	18	25	67	−42	21	Relegated to Uzbekistan 1-Division
16	Kimyogar Olmaliq (R)	32	5	5	22	30	68	−38	15	Relegated to Uzbekistan 1-Division
17	Surkhon Termez (R)	32	0	12	20	15	64	−49	12	Relegated to Uzbekistan 1-Division

Source: RSSSF
Rules for classification: 1) Points; 2) Goal difference;
(C) Champions; (R) Relegated

== Match results ==
	1	2	3	4	5	6	7	8	9	10	11	12	13	14	15	16	17
1. FC Pakhtakor Tashkent		1:2	4:1	1:0	1:0	5:3	6:1	7:2	3:0	2:1	7:4	2:1	5:1	2:1	4:1	7:3	4:0
1. Neftchi Farg'ona	2:0		2:2	1:0	1:0	1:0	2:0	4:0	3:0	0:0	4:0	5:0	6:0	1:0	3:0	+:-	4:0
3. Sogdiana Jizzakh	4:1	0:0		3:0	1:0	1:0	2:1	6:0	3:0	2:1	2:1	6:0	3:0	1:0	3:0	3:0	10:0
4. Nurafshon Buxoro	2:0	1:0	3:1		1:1	3:0	2:2	2:1	2:1	6:0	4:2	3:1	5:0	4:1	0:0	3:0	4:0
5. Navbahor Namangan	1:1	2:0	3:1	2:1		2:0	2:0	1:0	4:1	1:1	5:0	2:0	1:0	6:0	4:1	5:0	+:-
6. Temiryo'lchi Qo'qon	0:0	0:0	1:0	1:1	1:0		2:1	2:2	2:0	2:0	2:0	3:0	5:1	+:-	2:1	2:0	2:0
7. Navro'z Andijan	0:3	0:3	1:3	0:0	1:1	0:0		2:1	1:0	4:1	3:1	1:1	2:1	4:1	7:0	3:1	+:-
8. Kosonsoychi Kosonsoy	0:1	2:3	3:0	1:0	-:+	1:1	2:1		3:0	1:0	4:1	0:2	1:1	+:-	1:0	2:0	1:0
9. Traktor Tashkent	1:2	0:2	1:0	0:1	2:1	2:3	3:0	1:1		4:1	0:1	1:1	2:0	3:2	4:1	1:2	2:2
10. Maroqand Samarqand	1:4	0:2	0:2	1:2	1:1	2:1	0:0	1:1	1:1		3:0	2:1	2:1	2:0	2:1	2:0	2:1
11. Pakhtakor-79 Tashkent	2:3	0:0	1:3	0:1	0:1	0:2	1:3	1:1	1:0	0:0		3:1	2:0	3:0	1:0	1:0	4:1
12. Chirchiq	1:1	2:1	0:1	1:1	0:0	1:4	3:2	0:0	1:2	1:1	1:1		2:3	3:0	0:0	2:1	2:0
13. Yangiyer	1:3	2:0	1:0	1:2	2:4	2:1	1:2	0:2	0:1	1:1	1:2	3:1		4:2	5:0	5:1	1:1
14. Aral Nukus	1:0	0:3	2:4	0:1	1:0	0:2	0:1	2:0	1:1	1:0	2:2	2:1	1:0		5:0	+:-	3:1
15. Shahrixonchi Shahrixon	1:2	1:5	0:6	0:1	0:0	1:2	1:1	1:0	3:2	2:0	2:1	0:0	2:2	1:0		+:-	4:0
16. Kimyogar Olmaliq	2:9	0:3	1:2	1:3	2:3	-:+	0:0	0:2	1:3	1:0	2:2	2:2	2:0	0:0	3:0		3:1
17. Surkhon Termez	0:3	1:3	0:2	0:0	1:1	1:1	1:1	0:0	0:1	0:0	0:0	1:3	-:+	0:0	1:1	2:2	

== Top scorer ==
#	Footballer	Club	Goals
1	(Uzbekistan) Valeriy Kechinov	Pakhtakor Tashkent FK	22
1	(Uzbekistan) Rustam Abdullaev	FK Kokand 1912	22
3	(Uzbekistan) Furqat Esanbaev	FK Andijon	18
3	(Uzbekistan) Hamza Jabbarov	FC Dinamo Samarqand	18
