= Rustam Abdullaev =

Soviet footballer (born 1971)

Personal information
- Full name: Rustam Rakhmonovich Abdullaev
- Date of birth: 1 January 1971 (age 55)
- Place of birth: Tashkent, Uzbek SSR
- Position: Midfielder

Senior career*
Years	Team	Apps	(Gls)
1989–1991	Avtomobilist Kokand		
1992	Temiryo'lchi Qo'qon		(18)
1993	Neftchi Farg'ona		
1994	MHSK Tashkent		
1995	Perlis FA		
1996–1997	MHSK Tashkent		
1998	Pakhtakor Tashkent		
1998	Temiryo'lchi Qo'qon		
2000	Nasaf Qarshi		

International career
1992–1995	Uzbekistan	12	(3)

Managerial career
- ??–2014: Lokomotiv Tashkent (general manager)
- 2014–2015: Kokand 1912
- 2016: Neftchi PFK (President)
- * Club domestic league appearances and goals

Rustam Rakhmonovich Abdullaev (Russian: Рустам Рахмонович Абдуллаев; born 1 January 1971) is a former footballer and football coach. He is a former member of the Uzbekistan national team. He recently worked as head coach of Kokand 1912.

== Playing career ==
In 1992, he played for Temiryo'lchi Qo'qon and became 2nd best goalscorer of Oliy League after Valeriy Kechinov. His club finished at 6th position. At the same year he was named 2nd best player following Valeriy Kechinov who was named Player of the Year 1992.

Abdullaev played for Uzbekistan national team in the 1994 Asian Games football tournament in Hiroshima (the first time Uzbekistan played a football tournaments after got independence from Soviet Union and winning the gold medal).

== Managing career ==
On 30 April 2014 he was appointed as head coach of Kokand 1912, after his predecessor in the club, Tokhir Kapadze moved to Neftchi Farg'ona as club chairman.

== Honours ==
=== Club ===
Neftchi Farg'ona

- Uzbek League (1): 1993

MHSK Tashkent

- Uzbek League (1): 1997

Pakhtakor

- Uzbek League (1): 1998

=== Individual ===
- Uzbekistan Footballer of the Year runner-up: 1992
- Uzbek League Top Scorer 2nd: 1992 (18 goals)

=== International ===
- Asian Games winner: 1994
