= Uzbekistan Professional Football League =

Governing body of Uzbekistan football

- O'zbekiston professional futbol ligasi Ўзбекистон профессионал футбол лигаси
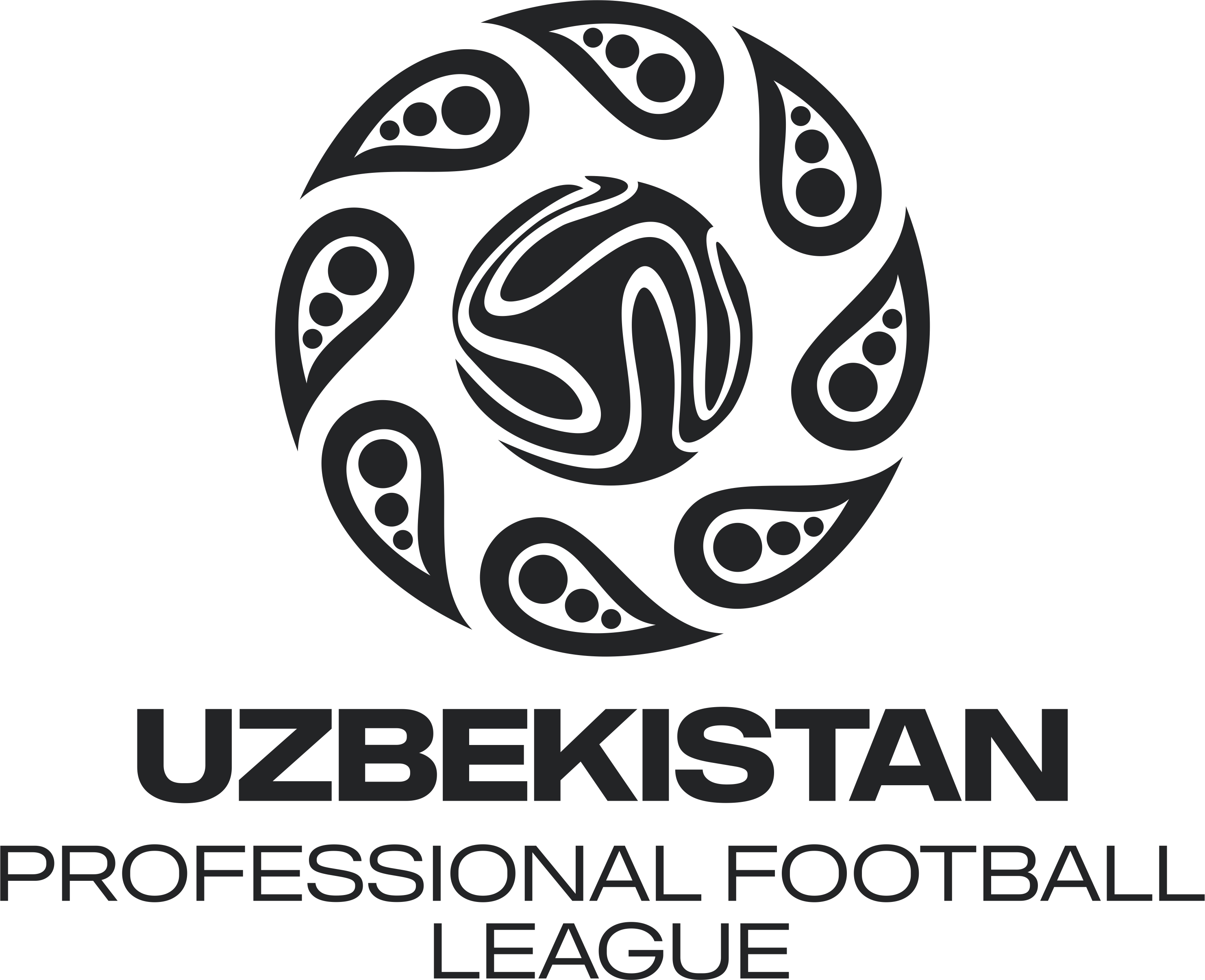
- Abbreviation: OʻzPFL; ЎзПФЛ
- Formation: 2008
- Founder: Asian Football Confederation; Uzbekistan Football Association
- Type: Sports and football organization
- Legal status: NGO
- Location: 47, Bunyodkor street, Tashkent, Uzbekistan
- Coordinates: 41.279036°N 69.212472°E
- Region served: Uzbekistan
- Services: Coordinates the competitions as Uzbekistan Cup, Super League, Pro League, First League, League Cup, Super Cup, U19 and U21 championships, etc.
- Members: World Leagues Forum (2023)
- Official language: Uzbek, English
- Director-General: Diyor Imamkhodjaev
- Main organ: Executive Committee
- Parent organization: Uzbekistan Football Association; Ministry of Sports
- Website: pfl.uz

Uzbekistan Professional Football League, briefly UzPFL (Uzbek: Oʻzbekiston professional futbol ligasi / Ўзбекистон профессионал футбол лигаси, OʻzPFL, ЎзПФЛ) — a football organization that manages and oversees the entire system of the country's football leagues. In 2008, following a recommendation from the Asian Football Confederation, it was separated from Uzbekistan Football Federation to become an independent organization.

Coordinates the conduct of such professional football competitions as Super League, Pro League, First League, Uzbekistan Cup, League Cup, Uzbekistan Super Cup, Uzbekistan U19 and U21 championships, etc. Organizes competitions among football clubs, provides instruction on their sports and organizational and managerial activities, as well as relationships.

Facilitates the organization of football competitions at various levels in cooperation with ministries, departments, enterprises, and organizations of Uzbekistan.

It is one of the leading leagues in Asia in terms of licensing.

As of March 2026, six companies in Uzbekistan are official sponsors of the League.

== History ==
In 1992, it was part of the organizational structure of Uzbekistan Football Federation and was the division responsible for holding professional football competitions in Uzbekistan. In early 2008, Asian Football Confederation recommended to Uzbekistan Football Federation establishing the PFL as a separate organization. It was established on June 20, 2008 at the General Meeting of the Football Federation and Football Clubs of Uzbekistan and was registered by the Ministry of Justice on July 2.

From 2008 till 2018, held the youth football championship of Uzbekistan. From 2019 to 2023, supervised the holding of women's football (Premier League, First League, Cup, Super Cup), and from 2017 to 2025 held futsal championship (Premier League, Cup and others) of Uzbekistan.

Became a member of the Association of World Leagues Forum on January 10, 2023.

In partnership with Fantasy Sports & Gaming Association, launched the Fantasy Uzbekistan Super League project ahead of 2026 Uzbekistan Super League season.

== Purpose and objectives ==
The main goal of Uzbekistan Professional Football League is to coordinate the holding of professional football competitions on the territory of the Republic of Uzbekistan among football teams in the respective Super League, Pro League, First League, Uzbekistan Cup, League Cup, Super Cup of Uzbekistan, all the age categories of Uzbekistan. Organize and conduct competitions among football clubs, coordination of professional football competitions, organization and conduct of competitions between football clubs, as well as management of their sports, organizational and managerial activities and relations.

Every month according to the vote of experts, determines the winners in the nominations of the best player, the best referee, the best goal in the Super League and organizes the work of awarding them. Every month, it determines the winners of the best football club of Uzbekistan, the best player women/men, the best referee and other nominations and organizes their awarding at the end of the year.

== Leaders ==
Farkhad Magametov worked as the first head of the organization from 2008 till 2017. From September 2017 to 2019, Amon Gafurov headed the organization. Later, in 2019–20, the organization was headed by Davron Shokurbanov. Diyor Imamkhodjaev, who temporarily served as the Director General from 2020 to 2022, was appointed as the Director General of the organization in 2022. On August 19, 2026, Imamkhodjaev was re-elected to the position of Director-General.

Name	Appointed	Disappointed
Farkhad Magametov	04.09.2008	04.09.2017
Omon Gafurov	04.09.2017	17.06.2019
Davron Shokurbanov	17.06.2019	26.05.2020
Diyor Imamkhodjaev	26.05.2020	till now

=== Executive Committee ===
Diyor Imamkhodjaev, Director General.

Odil Akhmedov, member of the Executive Committee, vice-president of Uzbekistan Football Association.

Tulabek Akramov, member of the Executive Committee, president of FC Lokomotiv Tashkent.

Bahodir Mirzayev, member of the Executive Committee, director general of FC AGMK.

Alisher Yusupov, member of the Executive Committee, manager of FC Nasaf.

Kamoliddin Murzoev, member of the Executive Committee, Director of FIFPro Uzbekistan.

Elbek Samatov, member of the Executive Committee, manager of FC Andijon.

Maksud Karimov, member of the Executive Committee, manager of FC Khorazm.

Oybekkhan Ibrahimkhanov, member of the Executive Committee, legal consultant of Uzbekistan Professional Football League.

=== Personnel ===
Diyor Imamkhodjaev, Director-General.
Abdulbasit Valikhonov, Deputy Director-General — Head of communications department.
Abboskhon Akhrorov, Deputy Director-General — Head of marketing department.
Sardor Kudratullaev, Deputy Director-General — Head of sports department.
Sherzod Rajabov, Head of Press-service department.

Shakhzod Kholbaev, chief specialist
Mukhammadamin Zukhriddinov, leader specialist

Azamat Umarov, Head of Broadcasting department.

Abdusattor Apirov, chief specialist
Javokhir Azimov, leader specialist

Fazliddin Khodjimukhamedov, Head of Media department.

Kobil Adilov, chief specialist
Dilshod Nazirlaev, leader specialist

Shokhrukh Said, Head of Competitions department.

Diyor Khotamkulov, chief specialist
Bekzod Aripov, chief specialist
Kudrat Madraimov, chief specialist

Davron Ibrokhimov, Head of marketing department

Khusan Sabitov, chief specialist

Jalolkhon Inogomkhujaev, Head of Licensing department.

Vladimir Nazarov, chief specialist
Sarvar Kholmedov, leader specialist
Shioslom Kholmatov, leader specialist

Dilshod Norqobilov, Head of Operations department.

Nargiza Jalalova, staff inspector
Dilafruz Ilyasova, chief specialist
Zarofat Rasulova, chief accountant
Larisa Ogay, accountant
Shukhrat Khusanov, driver-mechanic

== Competitions under the jurisdiction of UzPFL ==
=== Uzbekistan Super League ===
Uzbekistan Super League

Uzbekistan Super League is the highest division in the system of football competitions of Uzbekistan, in which professional football clubs participate. It was established in 1992 under the name of Supreme League. The championship will be held in March–November and each team will play 26 matches. From 2019, the title sponsor will be called the Pepsi Super League first, and then the Coca Cola Super League from 2020. From 2024, it will be called Artel Super League. In the history of the championships of Uzbekistan, a total of 45 clubs participated, and only 8 of them reached the championship podium: Pakhtakor - 16 times, Neftchi - 6 times, Bunyodkor - 5 times, Lokomotiv - 3 times, Dustlik - 2 times, MHSK - 1 time, Navbahor" - 1 time, Nasaf - 1 time. In different years, the number of teams in the championship of Uzbekistan was different. In the first years, 16 teams participated in the championship, then in different years the number of teams was 14, 18 and 20. Since 2025, the number of championship teams is 16.

=== Uzbekistan Cup ===
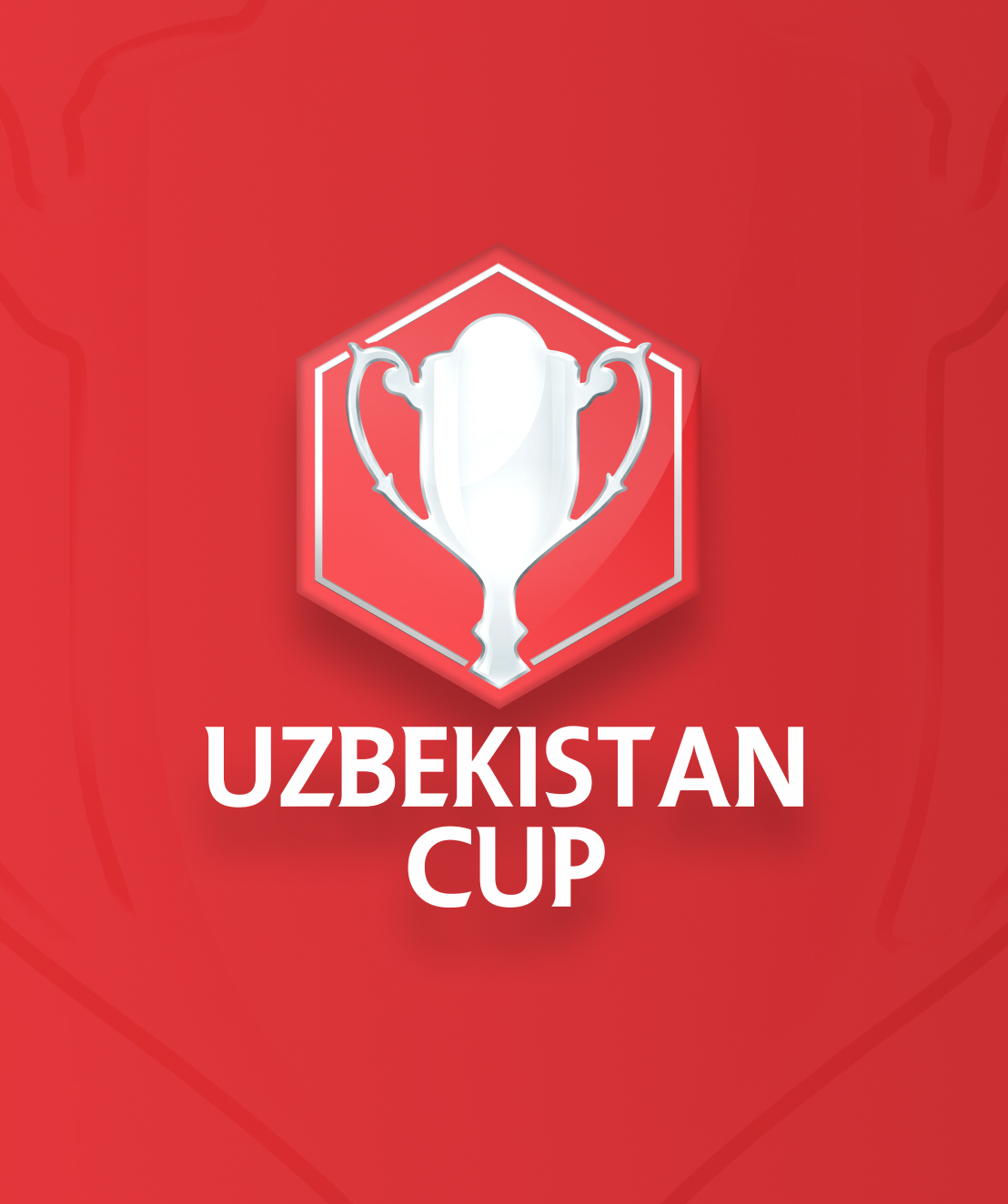
Uzbekistan Cup

A national football cup competition organized by Uzbekistan Professional Football League. Uzbekistan Cup competitions have been organized since 1992. The first winner of the competition is Navbahor. The winners of Uzbekistan Cup get the right to participate in the AFC Champions League.

The Pakhtakor football club is considered the record holder for the number of victories in Uzbekistan Cup: 14 times. The clubs Bunyodkor and Nasaf won 4 times each, Navbahor and Lokomotiv 3 times each, Neftchi 2 times, AGMK, Andijan and Dustlik 1 time each.

=== Uzbekistan League Cup ===
Uzbekistan League Cup is an annual men's football competition. The competition, which has been held since 2010 by Uzbekistan Professional Football League and Uzbekistan Football Association, was not held from 2016 to 2018. Uzbekistan League Cup was organized for the first time in 2019. It will be attended mainly by Uzbek clubs, as well as football clubs from Kyrgyzstan, Tajikistan, Turkmenistan and Kazakhstan at the invitation of UzPFL. The first winner of the competition was Pakhtakor. Since 2020, League Cup was not held.

=== Uzbekistan Super Cup ===
A competition consisting of one match between the current Uzbekistan Cup winner and the winner of the Uzbekistan Super League. In the event that one team wins the Cup and the Super League, then in the game for the Super Cup it will be opposed by the team that took second place in the Super League. The game for the Super Cup of Uzbekistan is traditionally held in late February or early March, opening a new football season in the country. Usually, it is held at a neutral stadium for both teams.

=== Uzbekistan Pro League ===
On November 21, 2017, according to the decision of the PFL management, Uzbekistan First League was officially renamed the Uzbekistan Pro League from 2018 season. In 2026 season 14 clubs are participating. From 2026 season 14 teams participating in Pro League.

=== Uzbekistan First League ===
It has been operating since 2010. Since the 2010 season, the first league competitions have been divided into two regions: the eastern region and the western region. Eastern region teams are made up of Andijan, Namangan, Fergana and Tashkent regional football clubs. The teams of the Western region are made up of football clubs of Syrdarya, Jizzakh, Navoi, Samarkand, Kashkadarya, Surkhandarya, Bukhara, Khorezm regions and the Republic of Karakalpakstan. Number of participating teams in each region: 14.

The First League of Uzbekistan previously served as a second-class competition in the football system. After the Pro League establishment in 2018, the First League was reorganized from 2020 and is now the third-tier competition in the country.

=== U21 Championship ===
A competition in which the youth teams of the Super League teams play in the football system of Uzbekistan. In accordance with the regulations of the UzPFL, players 21 years old and younger will participate in it. The matches of the U21 championship will be held one day after the main team matches.

=== U19 Championship ===
The youth national team under 19 years of age will defend the honor of Uzbekistan at the World Youth Football Championship (U20), Asian Championship under 19 years (U19) and other tournaments. A competition between under-19 teams of Super League and Pro League clubs. The U19 championship was founded in 2021. In it, all the clubs of the two top divisions will fight for the victory with their students. A competition between under-19 teams of Super League and Pro League clubs. The U19 championship was founded in 2021. In it, all the clubs of the two top divisions will fight for the victory with their students.

== Affiliated competitions ==
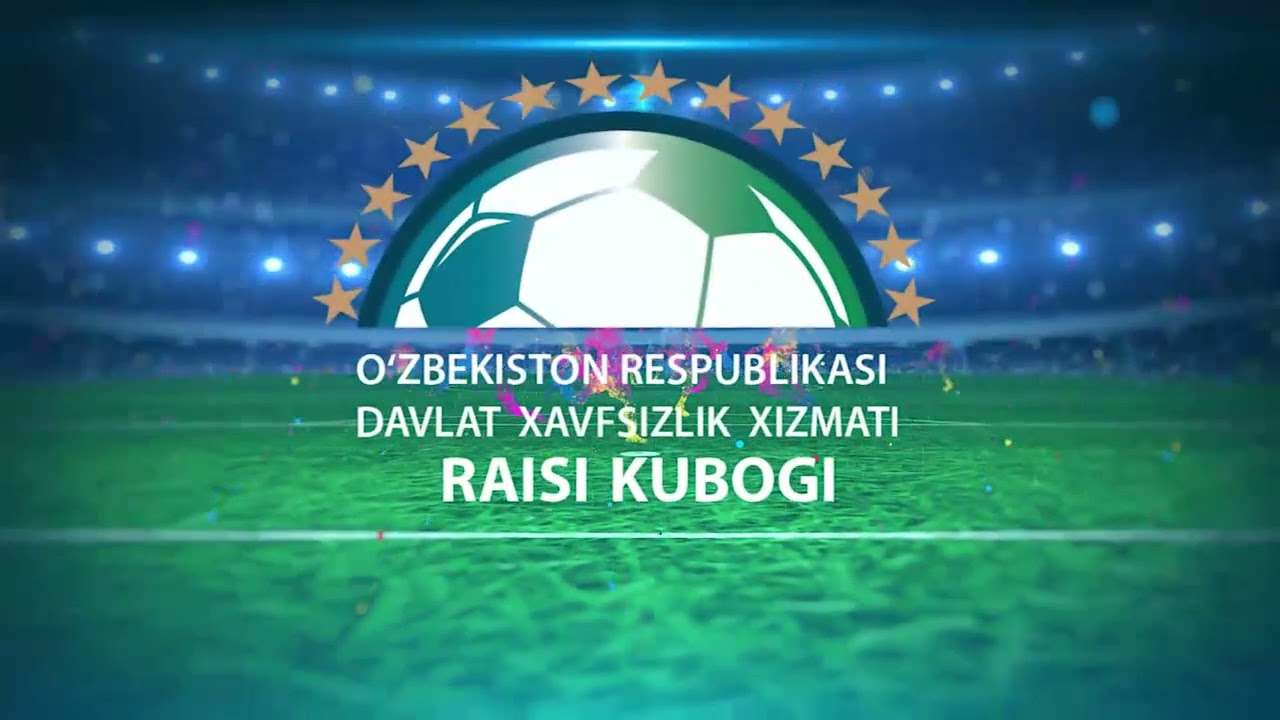
State Security Service Cup

Helds the State Security Service Cup (Uzbek: DXX kubogi) in cooperation with the State Security Service of the Republic of Uzbekistan, the Ministry of Sports, and the Youth Affairs Agency.

It also hosts student's cup competitions in collaboration with the Ministry of Higher Education, Science and Innovation, and the Ministry of Internal Affairs.

== Sponsors ==
Uzbekistan Professional Football League cooperated with the PepsiCo from 2018 to 2019. Since 2019, Coca-Cola Bottlers Uzbekistan has been sponsor of Uzbekistan Super League. Since 2020, established cooperation with the insurance company Apex Insurance. The company provides health insurance for more than 1,500 professional players registered in the league. From 2021 to 2022, the sponsors were Epsilon, JSC Madad Invest Bank, Turon Eco Cement and Jizzakh Battery Plant. From 2021 to 2023, a partnership was established with the UzReport TV television channel and the Volkswagen company. On March 16, 2023, the BMB Holding company became the official sponsor of Super League and ended sponsorship at the end of 2025 season. Also, during 2023, Olcha.uz information portal and private airline Centrum Air became partners of Uzbekistan Professional Football League. On February 28, 2024, the company Artel Electronics, which is considered the largest brand in the domestic appliances market of Uzbekistan, became the title sponsor of Super League until the end of 2026 season. On March 12 of this year, the Uzcard company became an official partner of Uzbekistan Professional Football League. From February till December 2025, the sports brand Macron was the official sponsor of UzPFL. In February 2026, UzPFL signed a strategic partnership agreement with Yandex Uzbekistan. On May 1, 2026, a new partnership agreement was signed between the League and BMB Holding.

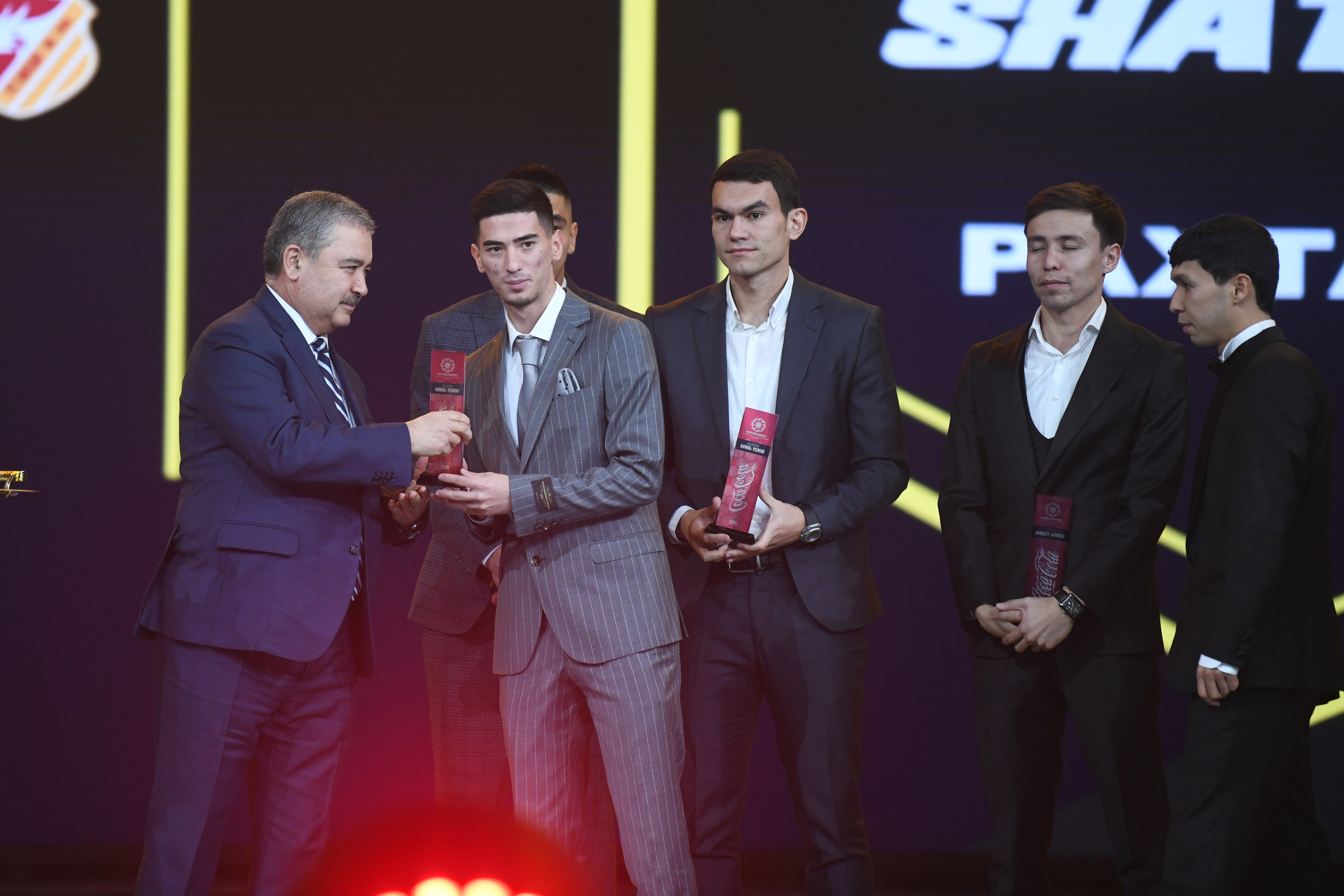
2022 UzPFL Awards Ceremony

== Achievements and projects ==
Uzbekistan Professional Football League is one of the leaders in licensing in Asian continent. At the end of 2021, 12 Uzbek clubs won the license of the Asian Football Confederation and this was recorded as the 3rd best result in the continent. In 2021, among the women's teams, 2 clubs from Uzbekistan became the first in Asia to successfully pass the licensing.

The Ministry of Justice of the Republic of Uzbekistan and the National Association of Non-Governmental Organizations of Uzbekistan have included UzPFL in the list of "Top 20 Most Transparent Non-Governmental Organizations" in 2021.

The U19 Championship has been recognized by Asian Football Confederation as "Asia's Best Youth League" in 2025.

UzPFL and football clubs is actively involved in organizing social responsibility and charity events. Support for various segments of the population through football matches and related social projects has been systematically established. As part of charity projects, in order to provide material and moral support to children suffering from oncohematological and difficult-to-treat diseases and their families, PFL leadership and famous players distributed gifts to patients. Also, part of the proceeds from the sale of tickets for football matches of various levels were directed to the children's treatment costs.
