= Bekzod Mamatkulov =

Uzbek football functioner

Bekzod Akmalovich Mamatkulov
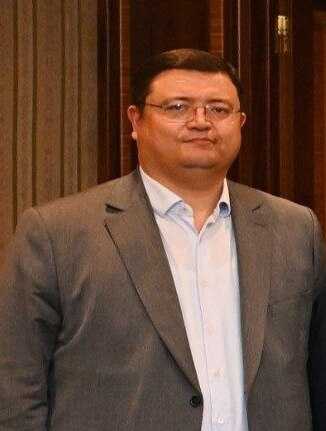
- Born: September 4, 1981 (age 44); Jizzakh, Uzbek SSR
- Occupations: Entrepreneur, Lawyer

Bekzod Akmalovich Mamatkulov (Uzbek: Бекзод Акмалович Маматкулов) is an Uzbek lawyer, businessperson and public figure. Founder and supervisory chairperson of BMB Holding board.

== Biography ==
Born on September 4, 1981 in Jizzakh Region. Graduated Tashkent Law University in 2003. Worked in leadership positions in government agencies. In 2016, he founded the investment company BMB Trade Group. Later, the company was renamed BMB Holding. In 2021, he founded the "BMB" futsal club under the auspices of his company and was the club's president until December 25, 2024. On the same day, he handed over the presidency to Aziz Mamatkulov.

Founded the BMB Cup, a youth futsal competition held from 2021 till now.

On December 25, 2024, became the president of Uzbekistan Futsal Federation. Member of Uzbekistan Football Association Executive Committee from 2026.
