= Diyor Imamkhodjaev =

Uzbek football commentator and journalist (born 1989)

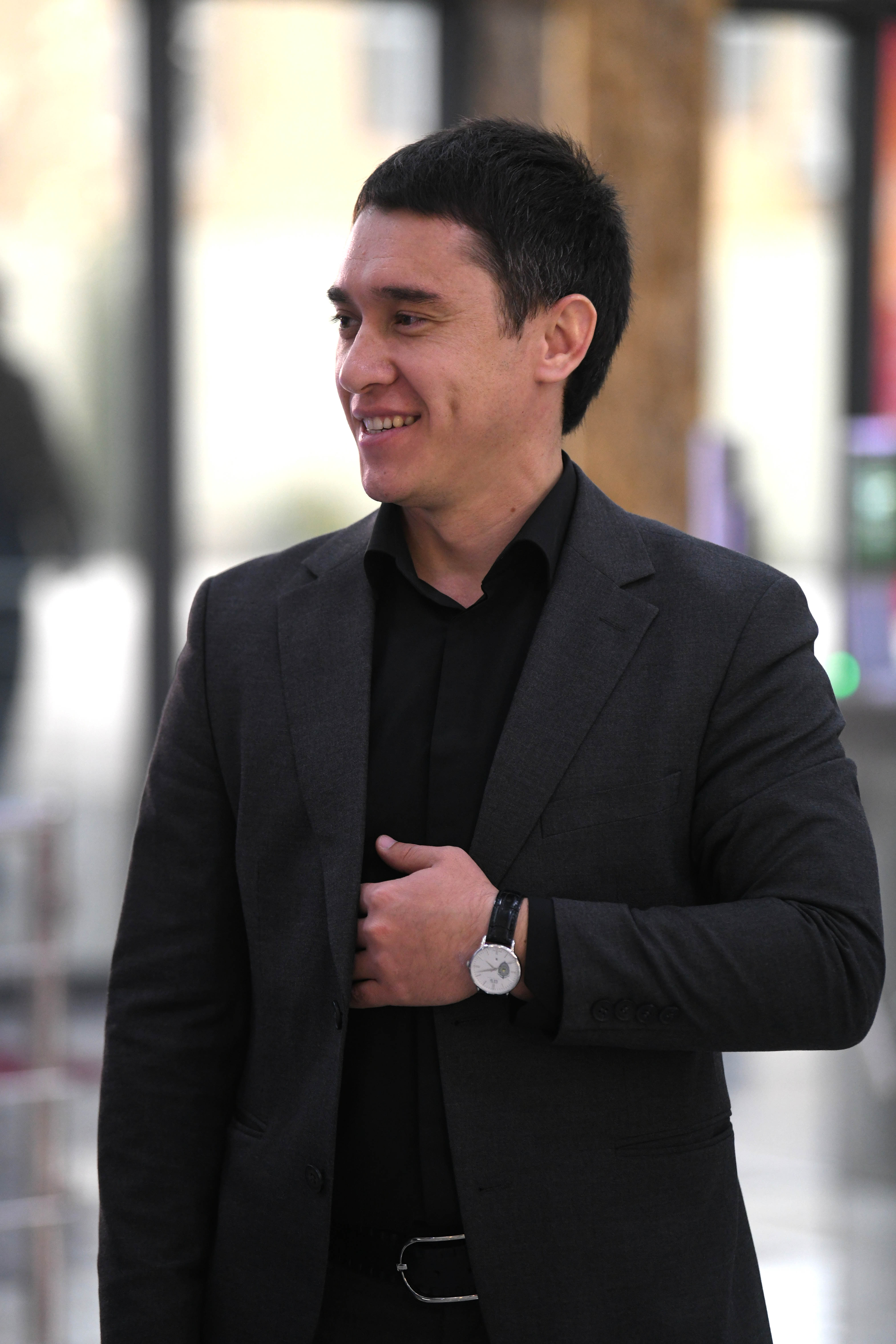
- Born: Имамходжаев Диёр Аброрович; 22 September 1989; Tashkent
- Occupations: Football commentator, journalist, blogger, football specialist
- Years active: 2005–present
- Website: pfl.uz/personnel

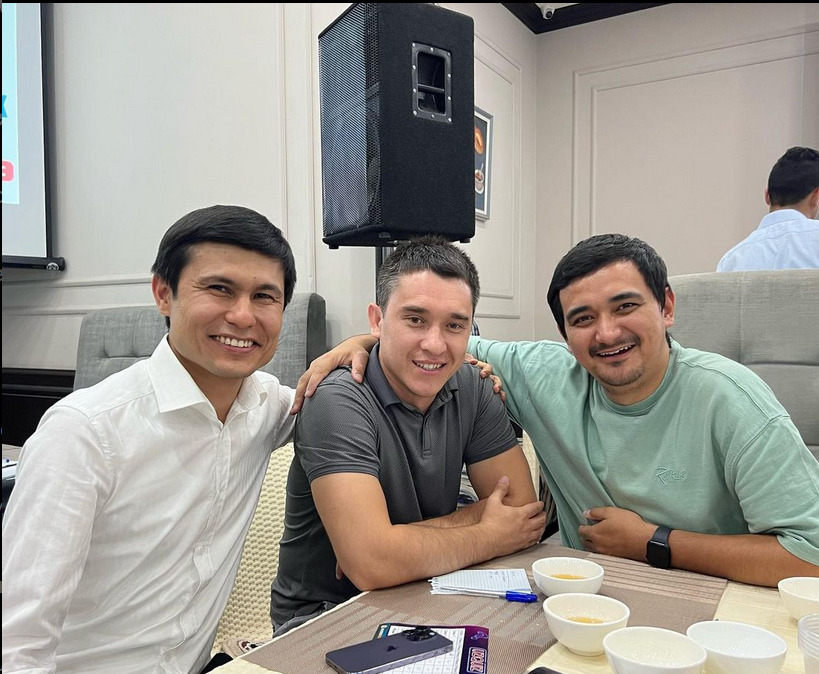
Khushnud Khudayberdiev, Diyor Imamkhodjaev and Mukhrim Agzamkhodjaev

Diyor Imamkhodjaev (Uzbek: Diyor Imomxoʻjayev / Диёр Имомхўжаев; born 22 September 1989 in Tashkent) is an Uzbek football expert, journalist, blogger, football commentator. On 28 May 2020, became the director-general of Uzbekistan Professional Football League.

== Biography ==
=== Early life and education ===
Born on 22 September 1989, in Tashkent, Uzbekistan, Imamkhodjaev pursued a career in journalism and media from an early age. Studied international journalism at Uzbekistan State World Languages University from 2007 to 2011. Attended a one-year scholarship program at State University of Jakarta in 2012. Later, from 2018 to 2021, pursued a second degree at Uzbekistan state university of physical education and sport.

=== Career ===
Imamkhodjaev's career in media began in 2005 when he worked as a sound engineer for "Navruz" radio. By 2008, he had started appearing on air, showcasing his skills as a commentator and journalist. In 2011, he played a crucial role in launching "kun.uz", nowadays one of Uzbekistan’s leading news websites.

From 2012 to 2015, he worked with Uzbekistan Professional Football League’s press service and "Sport TV" channel. He also collaborated with various news outlets, including "daryo.uz" and "championat.asia". From 2016 to 2020, he gained prominence as a sports commentator on Uzreport TV and Futbol TV, covering major European leagues such as English Premier league, La Liga, Serie A, UEFA Champions League, and Europa League. At the same time, he worked in FC Lokomotiv Tashkent press service.

=== Football leadership ===
In 2019, Imamkhodjaev transitioned into football management when he was appointed to Deputy Director of Uzbekistan Professional Football League (PFL). His contributions to the league's development were quickly recognized, and in May 2020, he was promoted to interim Director-General of the organization based on a referring by Abdusalom Azizov. In May 26, 2022 approved for the position of Director-General. On August 19, 2026, was re-elected to the position of Director-General based on a referring by Bakhodir Kurbanov.

On 23 June 2023 became a member of the FIFA Chamber. On 28 December 2023 The AFC Professional Football Committee is established and Director General of Uzbekistan Professional Football League Diyor Imamkhodjaev has been appointed as a member of this committee.

In January 2026, became a member of Uzbekistan Football Association Executive Committee.

== Personal life ==
His grandfather Akhbor Imamkhodjaev was first Uzbek sports commentator, football referee of republican category, educator, honored mentor of youth in Uzbekistan. Founder of the Uzbek football commentators' school.

Father — Abror Imamkhodjaev, journalist of several Uzbek sports internet publications. He worked for many years in newspapers and television. He is the author of many television programs dedicated to the analysis of football news in Uzbekistan.

Uncle — Zafar Imamkhodjaev, journalist and sports commentator. Currently serves as the director of the Media and Public Relations Department and advisor to the president of National Olympic Committee of the Republic of Uzbekistan on information policy.

Diyor Imamkhodjaev is also a social media influencer with a significant following. His insights and commentary on football reach thousands of fans through platforms like Instagram, where he has over 40,000 followers.
