= Tulabek Akramov =

Uzbekistani sports administrator (born 1989)

Personal information
- Nationality: Uzbekistan
- Born: May 26, 1989 (age 37)
- Education: Tashkent State University of Law
- Occupation: Club Manager
- Employer(s): PFC Lokomotiv Tashkent; Uzbekistan Professional Football League

Sport
- Country: Uzbekistan
- Sport: Football,
- Position: Club Manager

Tulabek Akramov (Uzbek: To’labek Akramov; Russian: Акрамов Тулабек; born May 26, 1989, Sirdarya, USSR) is an Uzbekistani sports administrator, Vice President of PFC Lokomotiv Tashkent and member of the executive committee of Uzbekistan Professional Football League.

== Biography ==
Tulabek was born on May 26, 1989, in the Syrdarya region (Hovos district). He studied at school 227 in Tashkent from 1996 to 2005, and then from 2005 to 2007, attended school 244. He later continued higher education at Tashkent State University of Law from 2007 to 2011, graduating from the Faculty of Law.

=== Professional career ===
He began his professional career as an "Assistant Prosecutor" at the Tashkent Transport Prosecutor's Office from 2011 to 2013. In 2013, he took on a managerial role, serving as the general manager of the professional football club "Lokomotiv Tashkent" until 2023. and same time Deputy General Director of the club. On January 1, 2024, he appointed the role of Vice-president at PFC "Lokomotiv"

==== Achievements in the club ====
3 times champion of Uzbekistan, 3 times Winner of the Cup of Uzbekistan, 2 times Winner of the Super Cup of Uzbekistan, 3 times Vice-champion of Uzbekistan, 1-time bronze medalist.

== Personal life ==
Akramov is married and father of 2 kids.

== See also ==
PFC Lokomotiv Tashkent
Uzbekistan Professional Football League
