= Centrum Air =

Airline of Uzbekistan

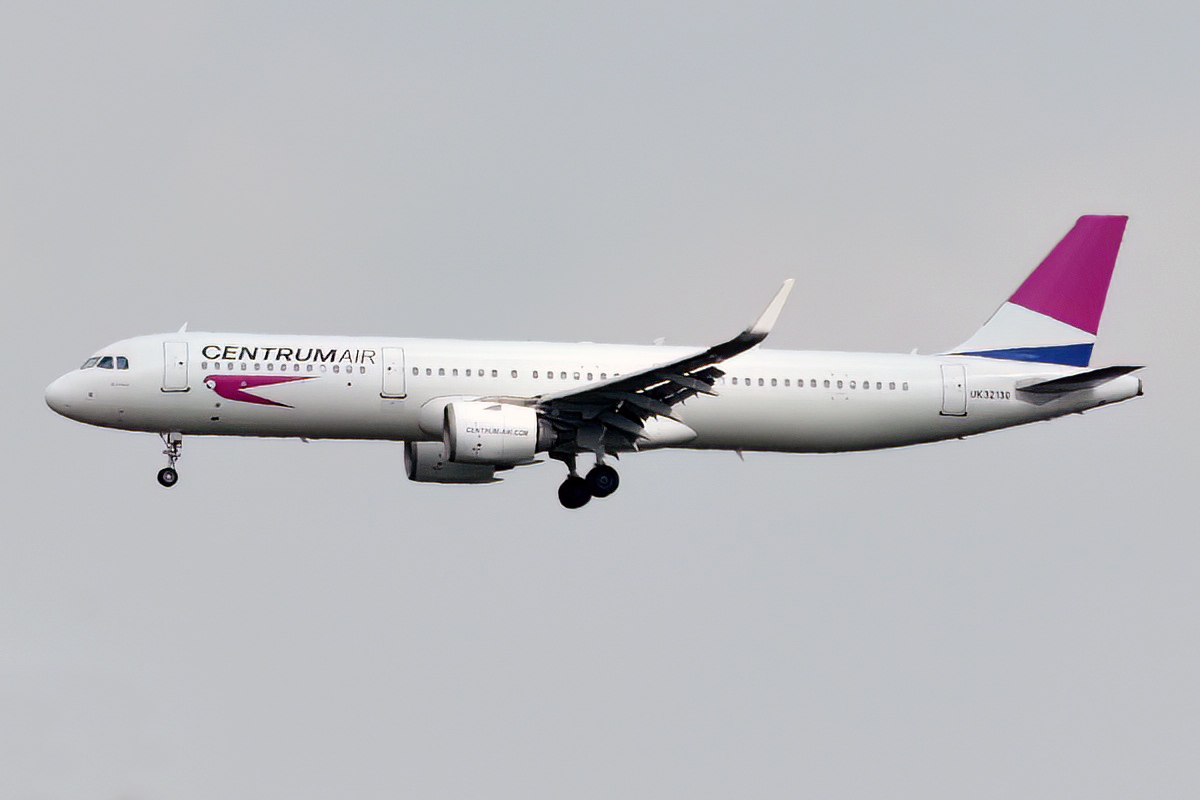
- Centrum Air Airbus A321neo
IATA	ICAO	Call sign
C6	MFX	WHITEBIRD
- Founded: 2023
- Commenced operations: 18 January 2023
- Hubs: Tashkent
- Focus cities: Samarkand
- Fleet size: 16
- Destinations: 50+
- Parent company: Centrum Holding LLC
- Headquarters: Tashkent, Uzbekistan
- Key people: Abdulaziz Abdurakhmanov, Founder, Director General; Khafizjon Gafurov, Co-Founder
- Website: www.centrum-air.com/

Centrum Air is a private hybrid airline based in Tashkent, Uzbekistan.

== History ==
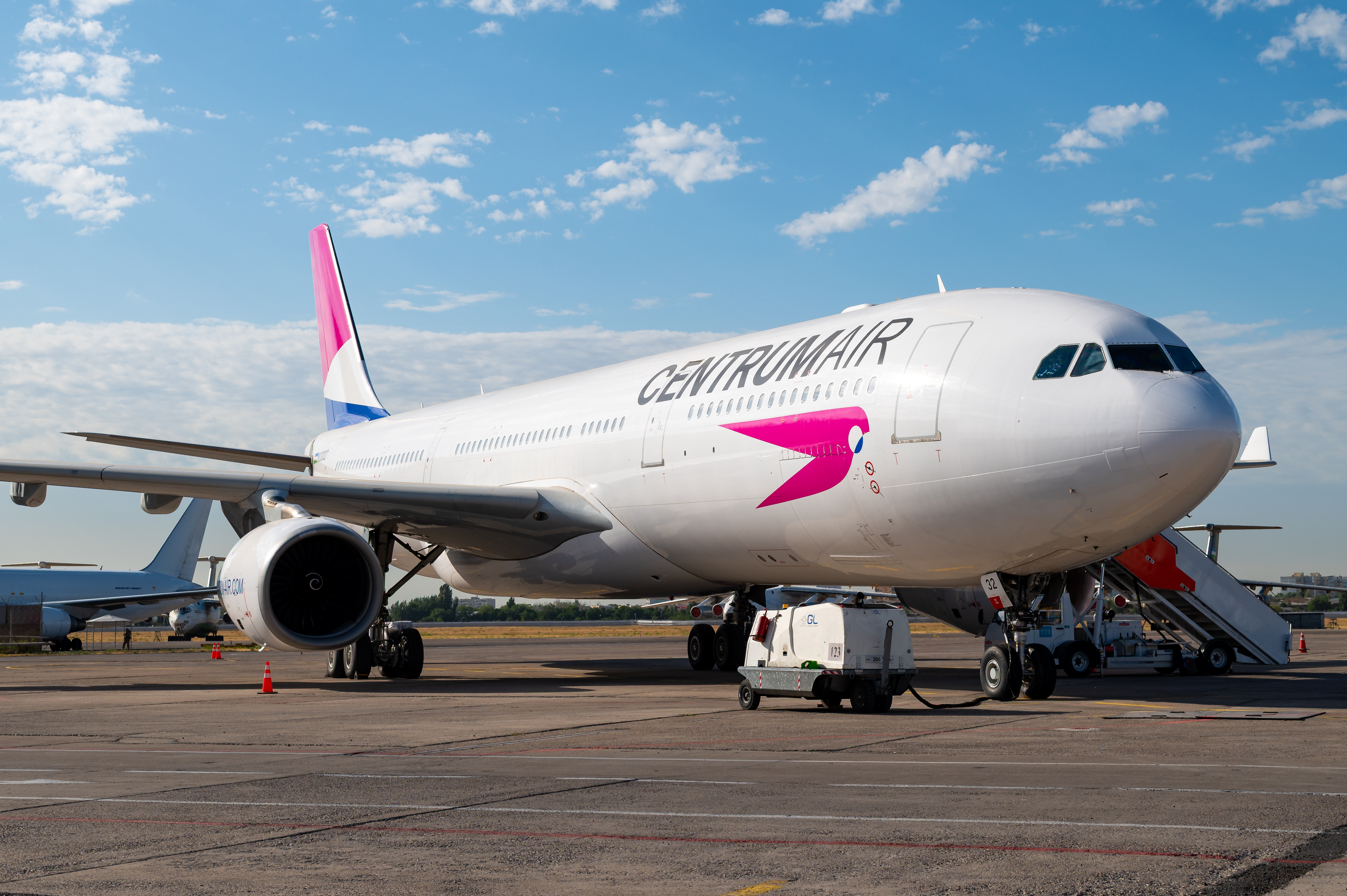
Centrum Air Airbus A330-300

Centrum Air is a private airline specialising in providing passenger and cargo transportation created on 18 January 2023, as part of government initiatives aimed at improving the quality of air travel for residents of Uzbekistan. The airline actively operates charter and scheduled flights to domestic and foreign destinations.

In 2025, Acron Aviation signed a multi-year agreement with Centrum Air. The contract, provides for Full Flight Simulators to enhance pilot qualifications. Training will primarily take place at Acron Aviation's modern training centre in Bangkok, with the possibility of expanding the program to the company's London facility. The program ensures that Centrum Air pilots receive training according to international safety and operational standards.

On 2 September 2025, CPaT Global, provider of distance learning for the airline and aviation industry, announced a new contract with Centrum Air. Under the agreement, CPaT will provide Centrum Air with Airbus A320 Enhanced and A320 NEO Aircraft Systems courses. In addition, airline will have access to CPaT's comprehensive General Subjects library to support their overall training programs.

On 23 September 2025, Centrum Air announced hiring first woman pilot - Susan Mamedova.

== Destinations ==
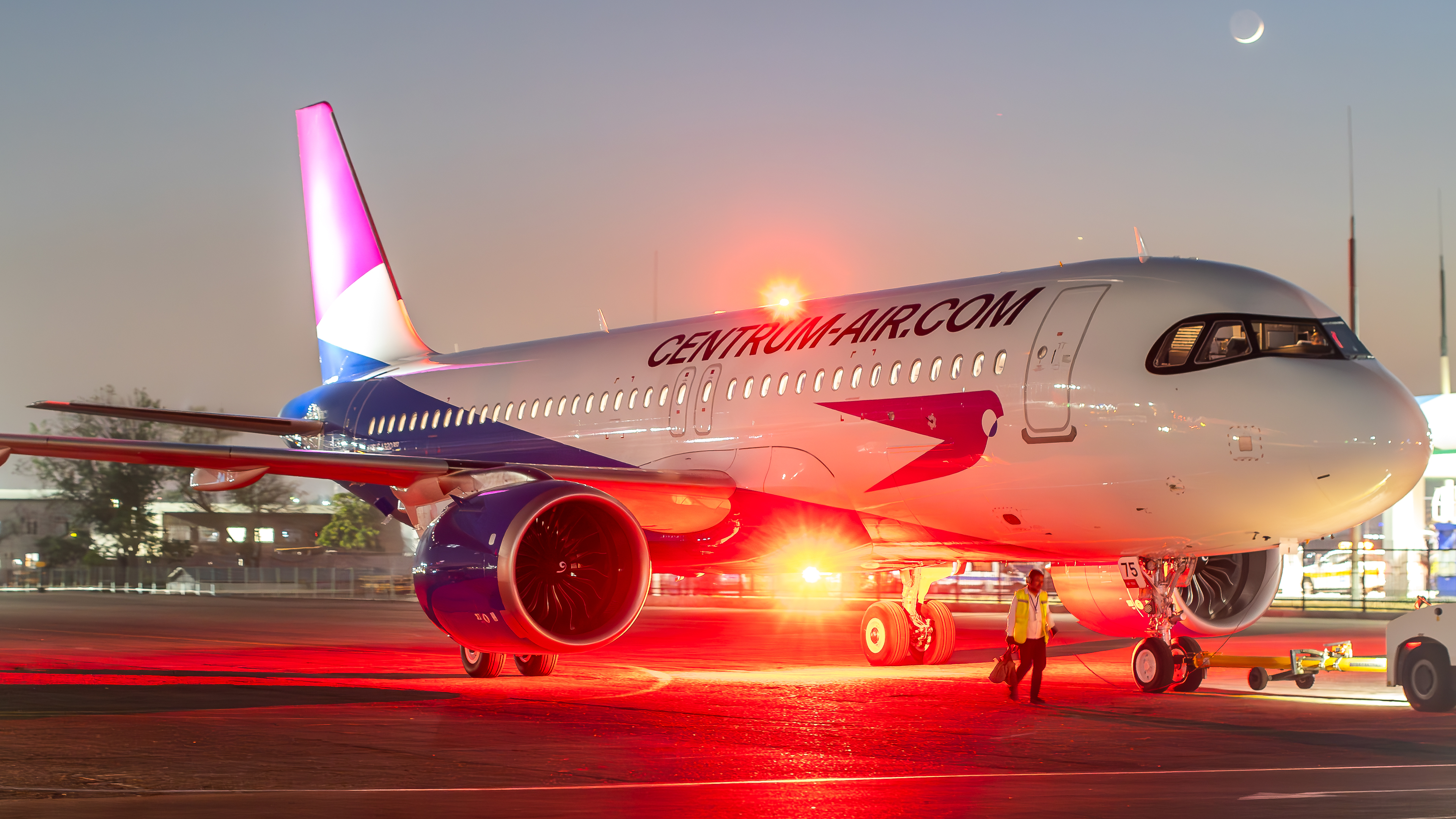
Centrum Air Airbus A320neo

As of November 2026, Centrum Air serves the following destinations:

Country	City	Airport	Notes	Refs
Azerbaijan	Baku	Heydar Aliyev International Airport		
China	Guangzhou	Guangzhou Baiyun International Airport		
Egypt	Sharm El Sheikh	Sharm El Sheikh International Airport	Terminated	
Georgia	Batumi	Alexander Kartveli Batumi International Airport	Terminated	
Georgia	Tbilisi	Shota Rustaveli Tbilisi International Airport		
Germany	Frankfurt	Frankfurt Airport	Seasonal	
India	Delhi	Indira Gandhi International Airport		
India	Hyderabad	Rajiv Gandhi International Airport		
Indonesia	Denpasar	Ngurah Rai International Airport		
Israel	Tel Aviv	David Ben Gurion Airport		
Kazakhstan	Almaty	Almaty International Airport		
Kazakhstan	Aqtau	Aqtau International Airport		
Kazakhstan	Aqtöbe	Aliya Moldagulova International Airport		
Kazakhstan	Astana	Nursultan Nazarbayev International Airport		
Kazakhstan	Oral	Mänşük Mämetova Oral International Airport		
Kazakhstan	Qostanai	Qostanai Airport		
Kyrgyzstan	Bishkek	Manas International Airport		
Kyrgyzstan	Osh	Osh Airport		
Kyrgyzstan	Tamchy	Issyk-Kul International Airport	Seasonal	
Maldives	Malé	Velana International Airport		
Oman	Salalah	Salalah International Airport		
Pakistan	Karachi	Jinnah International Airport		
Pakistan	Lahore	Allama Iqbal International Airport		
Romania	Iași	Iași International Airport	Terminated	
Russia	Chelyabinsk	Kurchatov Chelyabinsk International Airport	Begins 4 December 2026	
Russia	Grozny	Kadyrov Grozny International Airport		
Russia	Kazan	Ğabdulla Tuqay Kazan International Airport		
Russia	Khabarovsk	Khabarovsk Novy Airport		
Russia	Krasnodar	Krasnodar International Airport		
Russia	Krasnoyarsk	Krasnoyarsk International Airport		
Russia	Mineralnye Vody	Mineralnye Vody Airport		
Russia	Moscow	Moscow Domodedovo Airport		
Russia	Moscow	Sheremetyevo International Airport		
Russia	Novosibirsk	Tolmachevo Airport		
Russia	Omsk	Omsk Central Airport		
Russia	Perm	Bolshoye Savino Airport		
Russia	Saint Petersburg	Pulkovo Airport		
Russia	Samara	Kurumoch International Airport		
Russia	Sochi	Adler-Sochi International Airport		
Russia	Tyumen	Roshchino International Airport	Begins 3 January 2027	
Russia	Ufa	Mostay Kərim Ufa International Airport		
Russia	Ulan-Ude	Baikal International Airport		
Russia	Vladivostok	Vladivostok International Airport		
Russia	Yekaterinburg	Koltsovo International Airport		
Qatar	Doha	Hamad International Airport		
Saudi Arabia	Jeddah	King Abdulaziz International Airport		
South Korea	Seoul	Incheon International Airport		
Sri Lanka	Hambantota	Mattala Rajapaksa International Airport	Seasonal	
Tajikistan	Dushanbe	Dushanbe International Airport		
Thailand	Bangkok	Suvarnabhumi Airport		
Thailand	Phuket	Phuket International Airport		
Turkey	Istanbul	Istanbul Airport		
Turkey	Trabzon	Trabzon Airport		
United Arab Emirates	Dubai	Dubai International Airport		
Uzbekistan	Andizhan	Andizhan Airport		
Uzbekistan	Bukhara	Bukhara Airport		
Uzbekistan	Fergana	Fergana International Airport		
Uzbekistan	Namangan	Namangan Airport	Focus city	
Uzbekistan	Nukus	Nukus Airport		
Uzbekistan	Samarqand	Samarqand International Airport	Focus city	
Uzbekistan	Tashkent	Islam Karimov Tashkent International Airport	Hub	
Uzbekistan	Urgench	Urgench Airport	Focus city	
Vietnam	Nha Trang	Cam Ranh International Airport	Seasonal	
Vietnam	Phú Quốc	Phu Quoc International Airport		

In early 2024, Centrum Air passed the certification procedure in accordance with the requirements of the Chinese side and received operating permits for regular flights to China.

== Fleet ==
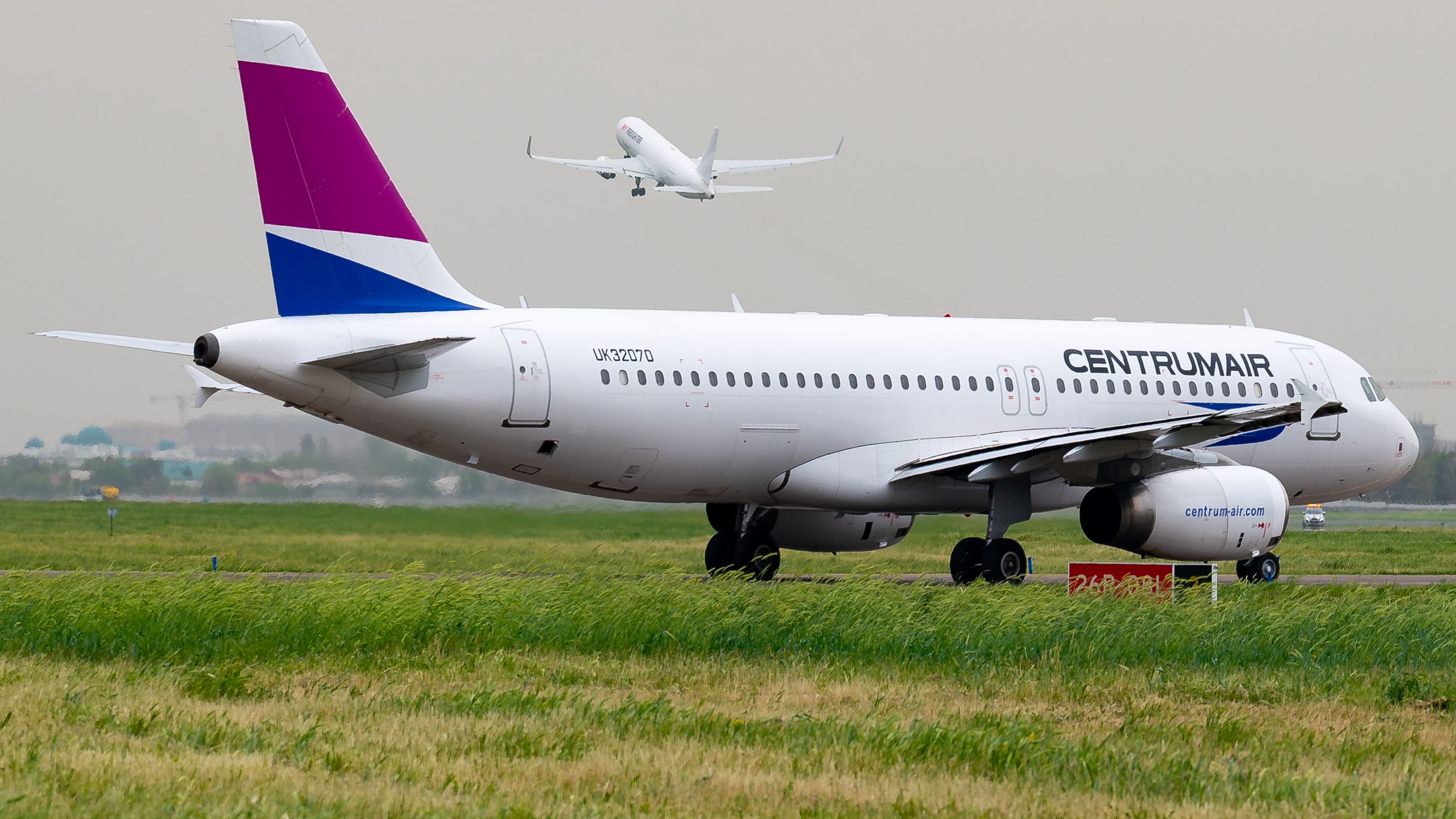
Centrum Air Airbus A320-200

The initial A320 fleet includes the airframe YL-GET leased from Lithuania's GetJet Airlines. In November 2025. Avolon, a global aviation finance company, has agreed to lease five Airbus A320neo family aircraft to Centrum Air. The transaction was announced at the Dubai Airshow.

In April 2026, airline announces the launch of a new initiative aimed at supporting historical and cultural values, under which the airline's aircraft will be named after outstanding historical figures. The first aircraft to receive a name under this initiative will be a passenger Airbus with registration number UK32070, which will be named after the great statesman and military leader Amir Temur. The choice is symbolically timed to coincide with the date of his birth. This initiative is aimed at promoting historical heritage and reflects respect for the history and contributions of the ancestors, which is an important part of the company's values and cultural mission. Another aircraft has been named after Alisher Navoiy – a great poet, thinker, statesman, and enlightener of the 15th century.

The airline hopes to have 24 planes in 2026, with a mix of Airbus A320 and Airbus A330 family jets.

As of May 2025, Centrum Air operates an all-Airbus fleet composed of the following aircraft:

Centrum Air fleet
Aircraft	In service	Orders	Seats	Notes
Airbus A320-200	6	—	180	One named after Alisher Navoiy
Airbus A320neo	2	6	186	
Airbus A321neo	4	—	216	
Airbus A330-300	4	—	347	
Total	16	6		

== Social responsibility ==
The airline takes part in social projects. It is an official partner of the Uzbekistan Professional Football League. At the beginning of 2023, an agreement was reached according to which the League, based on the results of each month, determines the winners in three categories: “Best Coach”, “Best Player” and “The Goal of the Month”. Conversely, the airline provides them with vouchers for vacations in various countries around the world, accommodating two individuals.

On 12 March 2025, Centrum Air signed partnership agreement with FC Andijon, an Uzbek professional football club based in Andijan.

In March 2026, Centrum Air helped to repatriate home more than two thousands citizens of the EU who stranded in Thailand and Maldives due to flight disruption in the Middle East because of the Iran war.
