= FC Sogdiana =

Association football club in Uzbekistan

Sogdiyona Jizzakh Soʻgʻdiyona Jizzax
- Full name: Sogdiyona Jizzakh Professional Football Club; Soʻgʻdiyona Jizzax Professional Futbol Klubi
- Nicknames: Sogdians; Yellows
- Founded: 1970; 56 years ago
- Ground: Sogdiyona Sport Majmuasi
- Capacity: 11,650
- Chairman: Uktam Mahmudjonov
- Manager: Ivan Bošković
- League: Uzbekistan Super League
- 2025: Uzbekistan Super League, 8th of 14
- Website: www.fcsogdiana.uz
Home colours	Away colours

Sogdiyona Jizzakh (Uzbek: Soʻgʻdiyona Jizzax Futbol Klubi / "Сўғдиёна" Жиззах Футбол Клуби), formerly known as Sogdiana, is an Uzbek professional football club based in Jizzakh, that plays in the Uzbekistan Super League.

Football Club Sogdiyona Jizzakh was founded in 1970, and is named after the ancient historical area of Sogdia. In Soviet times, the club was mainly involved in the Second and First Leagues of the USSR Championship. In 1979 it became the winner of zone "Central Asia" of the Second League of the USSR. In the debut drawing of the Uzbekistan Higher League in 1992, Sogdiana sensationally won the bronze medal of this league, an achievement which is still the highest in their history. Besides, they have three times became the winners of the Uzbekistan First League (now called the Uzbekistan Pro League), once won silver league medal, were also two-time winners of the Uzbekistan League Cup.

== History ==
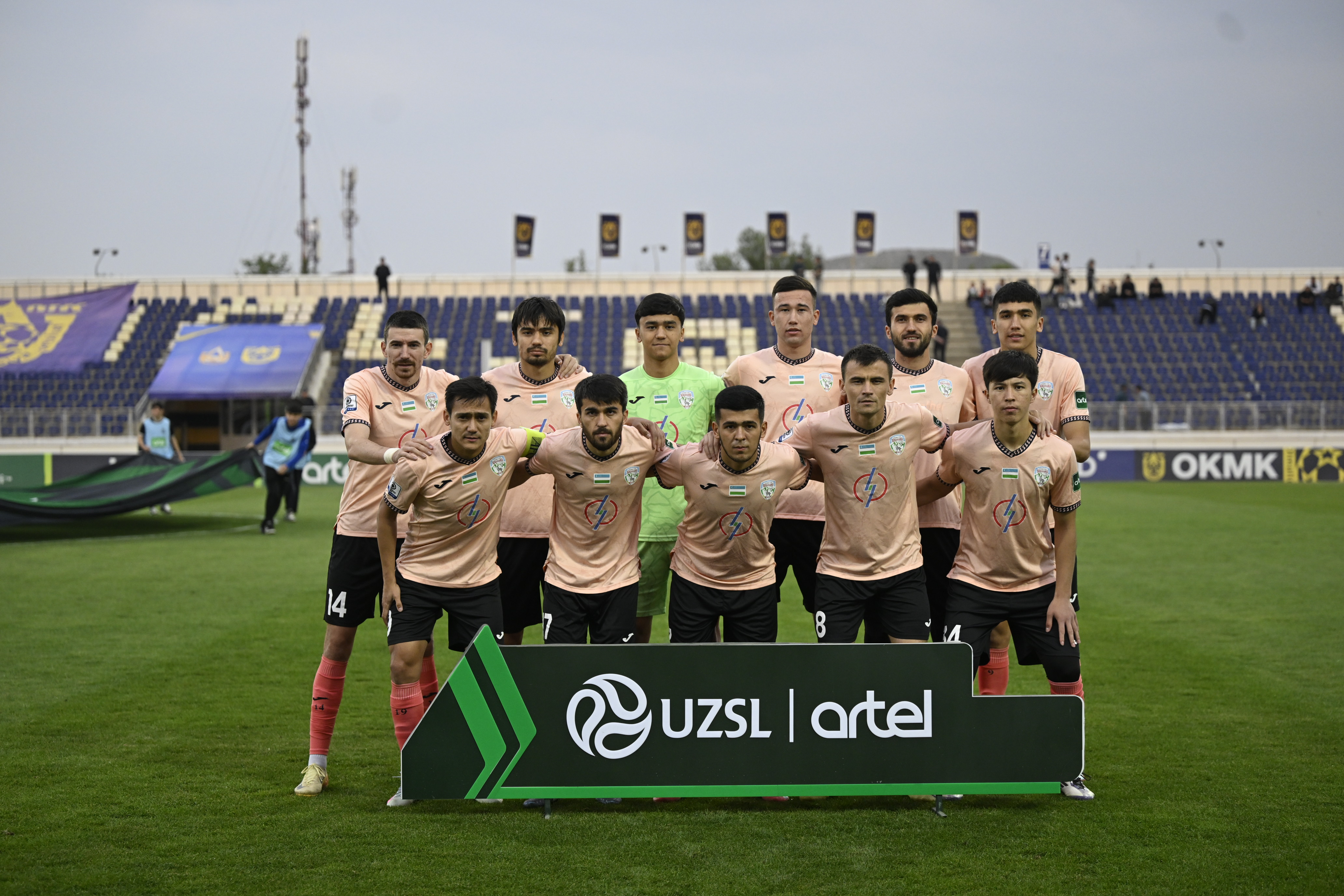
FC Sogdiana in 2025 Uzbekistan Super League match

Founded in 1970 under the name "Jizzakh" (some sources DSC), in the same year made his debut in Soviet Second League B, getting on the end of the penultimate tournament in 17th place. Since 1973 he participated in the USSR Second League, and in 1979 he was able to get a ticket to the USSR First League. In the USSR First League participated until 1985, and after departure again began to participate in the Second League. Until the dissolution of the USSR club participated in the USSR Second League. In the USSR Cup, max reached the 1/16 final in the season 1985/1986. In some periods, when the club flew even from the Second League, he participated in the Uzbekistan SSR Championship. In Soviet times, the club was an army team.

After Uzbekistani independence, the first Championship of Uzbekistan was played in 1992, and Sogdiana was included in the Highest League of the country. In that season, Sogdiana sensationally won bronze medals, and the championship was divided by Pakhtakor and Neftchi Ferghana because of the same number of points, and therefore silver medals were not awarded in that season to anyone. Until 2002 Sogdiana participated in the Higher League, but in the 2002 season took the last 16th place, flew to the Uzbekistan First League. In 2003, taking first place in the First League, is back in the Higher League, but in 2006 was again relegated to the second division. Through the season managed to get back in the big leagues, but twice and flew back to the top division of the country, thus becoming the "club lift". From 2013 to the present time again in the Higher League (since 2018 Uzbekistan Super League). In 2011 and 2012, won the Uzbekistan PFL Cup. In 2022, the club became the first team to enter AFC Cup as standby team after fellow Uzbek club FC Nasaf won the play-off at AFC Champions League.

=== Name changes ===
Period	Name
1970–1972	FC Jizzakh (also DSC)
1973–1975	Trud Jizzakh
1975–1976	FC Jizzakh
1976–1977	Irrigator Jizzakh
1978–1981	Buston Jizzakh
1982–1985	Zvezda Jizzakh
1986–1989	Yoshlik Jizzakh
1990–present	Sogdiyona Jizzakh

=== Domestic ===
Season	League									Uzbekistan Cup	Top goalscorer	
Season	Div.	Pos.	Pl.	W	D	L	GS	GA	P	Uzbekistan Cup	Name	League
1992	1st	3rd	32	23	2	7	78	27	48		Samad Narziqulov	14
1993	1st	4th	30	16	8	6	47	31	40		Bakhtiyor Gafurov	8
1994	1st	6th	30	14	7	9	53	35	35			
1995	1st	9th	30	11	3	16	43	50	36			
1996	1st	12th	30	9	3	18	32	61	30		Zinur Ziganshin	10
1997	1st	8th	34	15	7	12	51	46	52			
1998	1st	4th	30	16	4	10	56	43	52		Alexey Zhdanov	18
1999	1st	13th	30	8	8	14	43	52	32	N/A		
2000	1st	17th	38	9	5	24	46	96	32			
2001	1st	10th	34	14	5	15	45	51	47			
2002	1st	16th	30	8	5	17	33	55	29			
2003	2nd	1st	28	23	3	2	83	21	72		Kobil Alikulov	23
2004	1st	8th	26	9	2	15	27	47	29		Rasul Khayitov	11
2005	1st	14th	26	5	4	17	16	53	19		Shakhboz Erkinov	5
2006	1st	15th	30	7	3	20	23	48	24		Saidolim Sharofuddinov	4
2007	2nd	1st	38	26	7	5	79	27	85		Bekzod Abdumuminov	15
2008	1st	11th	30	8	9	13	32	48	33		Shakhboz Erkinov	13
2009	1st	16th	30	6	6	18	24	66	24			
2010	2nd	2nd	30	21	3	6	57	21	66	Round of 32	Bahodir Pardaev	26
2011	1st	16th	26	4	5	17	32	51	17	Quarterfinal	Sukhrob Nematov	7
2012	2nd	1st	30	22	1	7	71	40	67	Round of 16	Khurshid Yuldashev	26
2013	1st	10th	26	8	4	14	34	54	28	Round of 32	Sukhrob Berdiev	7
2014	1st	13th	26	7	3	16	32	49	24	Round of 32	Sukhrob Berdiev	5
2015	1st	15th	30	8	2	20	31	60	26	Quarterfinal	Jasur Khakimov	6
2016	1st	10th	30	9	7	14	23	41	34	Third round	Ikhtiyor Toshpulatov	5
2017	1st	13th	30	8	7	15	33	51	31	Third round	Sanzhar Rashidov	14
2018	1st	11th	20	6	6	8	18	23	24	Round of 16	Nikola Milinković; Oybek Nurmatov; Shokhruz Norkhonov	4
2019	1st	4th	26	11	7	8	29	29	40	Quarterfinal	Shokhruz Norkhonov	9
2020	1st	6th	26	10	8	8	34	32	38	Round of 16	Shokhruz Norkhonov	12
2021	1st	2nd	26	12	11	3	28	15	47	Quarterfinal	Shokhruz Norkhonov	10
2022	1st	7th										
2023	1st	11th										
2024	1st	3rd										
2025	1st	8th										

=== Continental ===
As of match played 5 October 2022

Competition	Pld	W	D	L	GF	GA
AFC Cup	6	5	1	0	13	3
Total	6	5	1	0	13	3

Season	Competition	Round	Club	Home	Away	Aggregate
2022	AFC Cup	Group E	(Kyrgyzstan) Neftchi	2–0		1st
2022	AFC Cup	Group E	(Tajikistan) CSKA Pamir Dushanbe	3–2		1st
2022	AFC Cup	Group E	(Turkmenistan) Altyn Asyr	3–1		1st
2022	AFC Cup	Central Asia Zonal final	(Tajikistan) Khujand	4–0		
2022	AFC Cup	Inter-zone play-off semi-finals	(Hong Kong) Eastern	1–0		
2022	AFC Cup	Inter-zone play-off final	(Malaysia) Kuala Lumpur City	0–0 (a.e.t.) (3–5 p)		

== Stadium ==
The stadium of Sogdiana, Jizzakh Stadium was built in 1970 with capacity 9,000. In 2012, the stadium was closed for the reconstruction. In 2013–14 season, Sogdiana played its home matches at Zaamin stadium. The construction works of renovated Markaziy Stadium were finished in 2015. The stadium changed its name to sporting complex Sogdiana and holds 11,650 spectators. On 26 June 2015, the stadium was officially opened with the league match between Sogdiana and Kokand 1912, in which Sogdiana emerged victorious with a 2–1 win.

== Women's football ==
The club also operated a women's football team, also called Sogdiana Jizzakh, and had participated in the 2022 AFC Women's Club Championship.

== Players ==
=== Current squad ===
As of 29 July, 2026

Note: Flags indicate national team as defined under FIFA eligibility rules; some limited exceptions apply. Players may hold more than one non-FIFA nationality.

No.	Pos.	Nation	Player
1	GK	UZB	Shokhrukh Isoqov
2	DF	TJK	Zoir Dzhuraboyev
3	DF	UZB	Islom Kobilov
4	DF	UZB	Behruz Dzhumatov
6	MF	UZB	Bekhruz Askarov
7	MF	SRB	Petar Mićin
8	MF	UZB	Jamshid Boltaboev
9	FW	BIH	Dženan Zajmović
10	FW	UZB	Javokhir Kakhramonov
13	DF	SRB	Filip Ivanović
14	FW	MKD	Ljupcho Doriev
17	MF	UZB	Ollobergan Karimov

No.	Pos.	Nation	Player
18	DF	UZB	Igor Golban
19	FW	UZB	Zabikhillo Urinboev
22	FW	UZB	Abdulazizkhon Abdurashidov
23	FW	UZB	Sardorbek Hosihimov
27	GK	SRB	Milan Mitrović
29	FW	UZB	Amirbek Saidov (on loan from Jedinstvo Ub)
32	MF	UZB	Nodirjon Soibov
33	DF	UZB	Shokhzhakhon Sultonmurodov
34	MF	UZB	Dilshod Misraliev
42	MF	UZB	Sardorbek Erkinov
74	GK	UZB	Bayram Nadzhafaliev
77	FW	UZB	Oybek Nurmatov

== Honours ==
=== Soviet Union ===
- Zone 5 "Central Asia" USSR Second League:
  - Champions: 1979
- Uzbekistan SSR Championship:
  - Champions: 1972

=== Uzbekistan ===
- Uzbekistan Super League:
  - Second place: 2021
  - Third place: 1992, 2024
- Uzbekistan First League:
  - Champions: 2003, 2007, 2012
  - Second place: 2010
- Uzbekistan League Cup:
  - Winner: 2011, 2012

=== Continental ===
- AFC Women's Club Championship
  - Champions: 2022

== Managers ==
Period	Head coach
1973	(Soviet Union) Nikolay Mednykh
1976	(Soviet Union) Oleg Bugaev
1979	(Soviet Union) Viktor Borisov
1982	(Soviet Union) Aleksey Mamykin
1980–1981	(Soviet Union) Ahrol Inoyatov
1983	(Soviet Union) Viktor Tikhonov
1984–1985	(Soviet Union) Gennady Krasnitsky
1986	(Soviet Union) Sergey Dotsenko
1987–1989	(Soviet Union) Yuriy Khristoforidi
1989	(Soviet Union) Suyun Murtazaev
1990	(Soviet Union) Sergey Dotsenko
1991–1992	(Soviet Union) Yuriy Khristoforidi
1992–1993	(Uzbekistan) Viktor Borisov
1995–1996	(Uzbekistan) Bakhtiyar Ghafurov
1997–2000	(Uzbekistan) Rauf Inileev
2003	(Uzbekistan) Bakhtiyar Ghafurov
2004–2006	(Uzbekistan) Suyun Murtazaev
2007–2008	(Uzbekistan) Furqat Esanbaev
2009	(Uzbekistan) Oleg Tyulkin
2010–2011	(Uzbekistan) Rauf Inileev
2011	(Uzbekistan) Murad Atadjanov
2012–2017	(Uzbekistan) Davron Fayziev
2018	(Uzbekistan) Alexander Mochinov
2019–	(Uzbekistan) Ulugbek Bakayev
