= Sergei Dotsenko =

Soviet-Uzbekistani footballer and coach

Personal information
- Date of birth: 7 September 1947
- Place of birth: Karaganda, Kazakh SSR, Soviet Union
- Date of death: 6 February 2006 (aged 58)
- Place of death: Tashkent, Uzbekistan
- Height: 1.70 m (5 ft 7 in)
- Position: Defender

Youth career
- 1964–1966: Pakhatakor Tashkent

Senior career*
Years	Team	Apps	(Gls)
1965	Politotdel Tashkent	1	(0)
1967–1970	Pakhatakor Tashkent	108	(5)
1971–1974	Dynamo Kyiv	73	(1)
1974–1975	Chornomorets Odesa	3	(0)
1976	Pakhatakor Tashkent	13	(0)

Managerial career
- 1977–1982: Khorezm Yangiaryk
- 1983: Pakhatakor Tashkent (assistant)
- 1984: Avtomobilist Namangan
- 1985: Khorezm Yangiaryk
- 1986: Yoshlik Jizzakh
- 1987–1989: Pakhatakor Tashkent (director)
- 1990: Sogdiana Jizzakh
- 1991: Pakhatakor Tashkent (assistant)
- 1992: Vorskla Poltava
- 1993: Temp Shepetivka
- 1993: Metalist Kharkiv
- 1994–1995: Sumy
- 1996–1997: Afrosiyob Samarqand
- 1998: Metallurg Bekabad
- 2000–2003: DAS Chagatay
- 2003–2004: Traktor Tashkent
- 2005: Shurtan Guzar
- * Club domestic league appearances and goals

Sergei Dotsenko (Russian: Сергей Александрович Доценко; 7 September 1947 – 6 February 2006) was a Soviet-Uzbekistani footballer and coach who also played and coached several Ukrainian clubs.
