= Adkham Ikramov =

Uzbek politician (born 1968)

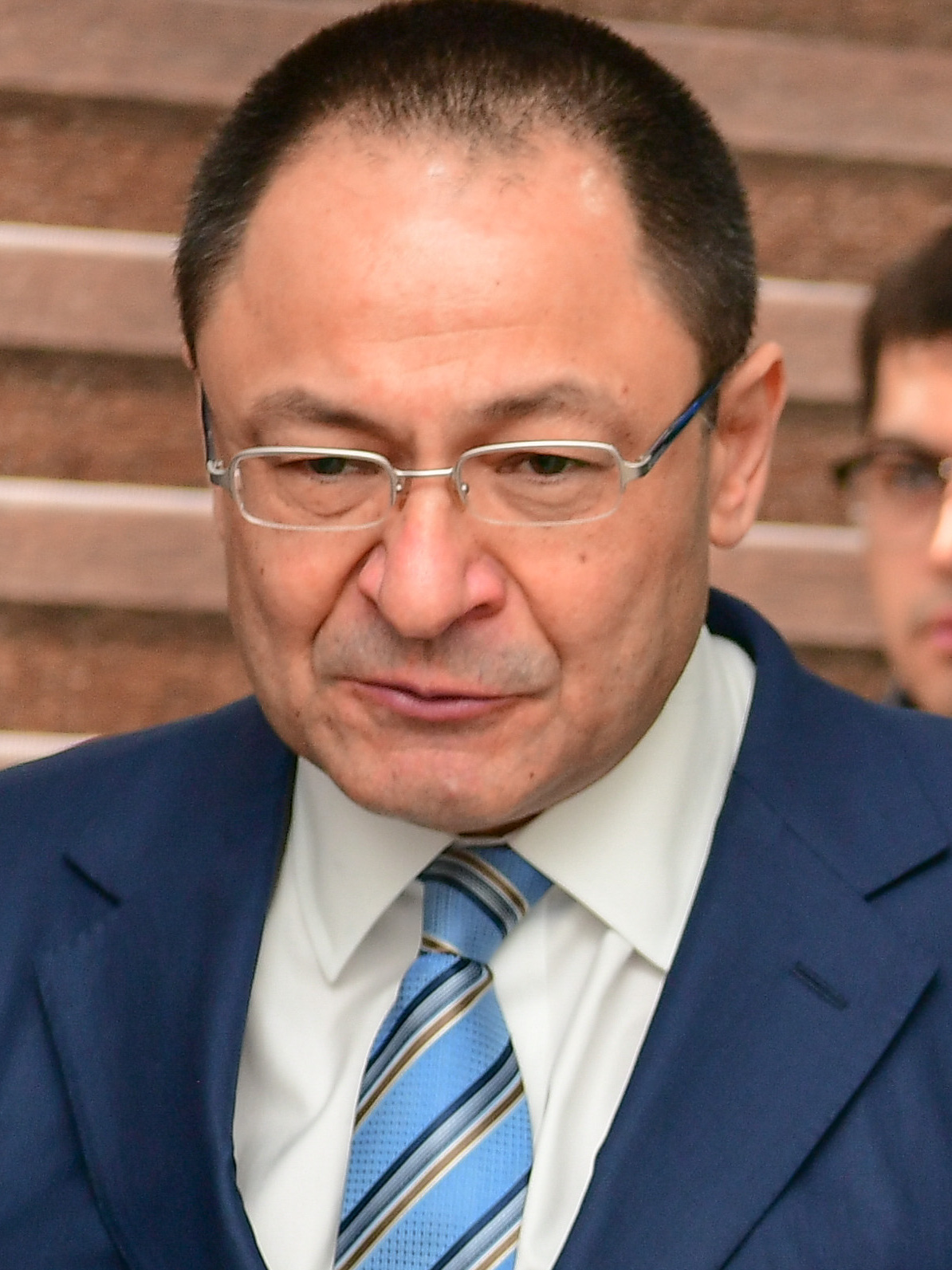
- Ikromov in 2019

Minister of Sports of Uzbekistan
- Incumbent
- Assumed office February 18, 2022
- President: Shavkat Mirziyoyev
- Preceded by: Position established

Personal details
- Born: December 20, 1968 (age 57) Tashkent, Uzbek SSR, Soviet Union
- Education: S. M. Kirov Military Medical Academy; Tashkent Medical Academy

Adkham Ilkhamovich Ikramov (born December 20, 1968, Tashkent, Uzbekistan) is an Uzbek former statesman, Minister of Sports (since January 18, 2024), Minister of Youth policy and Sports of the Republic of Uzbekistan (since December 30, 2022), Minister of Sports Development of the Republic of Uzbekistan (in 2022), Chairman Chamber of Commerce and Industry (2017–2022), Minister of Health of the Republic of Uzbekistan (2009–2012, 2016–2017), Deputy Prime Minister of the Republic of Uzbekistan (2012–2016).

== Life and career ==
Adkham Ikramov was born on December 20, 1968, in the city of Tashkent, in the family of a geologist. In 1985-1992 he studied at the S. M. Kirov Military Medical Academy (Leningrad) and the First Tashkent State Medical Institute, from which he graduated with honors.

Adkham Ikramov began his career as a surgeon at the Republican Specialized Center for Surgery named after Academician V. Vakhidov in 1994, subsequently heading the radiology department of this institution, where he worked his career from a doctor and head of the department to deputy director of the center. In 2007, A. Ikramov was invited to the Ministry of Health, where he took the position of first deputy minister. From April 25, 2009, according to the Decree of President Islam Karimov, A. Ikramov headed the Ministry of Health. On August 7, 2012, A. Ikramov becomes Deputy Prime Minister, and also begins to oversee the Complex for Health, Education and Science, and Social Protection of the Population.

Upon taking office as the President of Uzbekistan, on December 14, 2016, Shavkat Mirziyoyev appointed A. Ikramov as Deputy Prime Minister - Minister of Health, as well as the head of the newly created Complex for Health, Ecology and Environmental Protection, Physical Culture and Sports.

Adkham Ikramov is also the head of the Fencing Federation of Uzbekistan (since September 19, 2016).

As Minister of Health, Adkham Ikramov worked closely with international organizations such as UNDP, World Bank, Asian Development Bank, UN offices and funds (WHO, UNICEF, UNFPA, UNAIDS) and other international governmental and non-governmental organizations within the framework of an open dialogue to coordinate activities within the framework of priority programs of the government of the Republic of Uzbekistan. Adkham Ikramov was a member of the WHO Executive Board from the Republic of Uzbekistan from 2011 to 2012. As the Head of the delegation, he represented the Republic of Uzbekistan at the Olympic Games in Brazil in 2016, and was the chairman of the Fencing Federation of Uzbekistan. In 2012 – 2016 participated as the head of the delegation of the Republic of Uzbekistan at UNESCO sessions.

On February 18, 2022, he was appointed Minister of Sports Development of the Republic of Uzbekistan. On December 20, 2022, the President of Uzbekistan Shavkat Mirziyoyev announced a reduction in the number of ministries and departments in the country from 61 to 28. On December 28, 2022, the Ministry of Sports Development was transformed into the Ministry of Youth Sports Policy, by merging the Agency for Youth Affairs and the Ministry of Sports. On December 30, Ikramov was appointed to the post of minister. On January 20, 2024, the Ministry of youth policy and sport was transformed into the Ministry of Sport and Ikramov was appointed to the post of Minister. During the Paris 2024 Summer Olympic Games, he led the Uzbekistan delegation.

== Awards ==
- Order of Fidokorona Khizmatlari Uchun (2011) (Fidokorona xizmatlari uchun ordeni) (great contribution to the economic and cultural development of the country).
- Order of Labor Glory (2018) (Mehnat shuhrati ordeni) (outstanding labor merits that contribute to the rise of the economy and culture, the growth of the people's well-being, the preservation of peace and stability in Uzbekistan).
- Honored Health Worker of the Republic of Uzbekistan (2024).
