= Ministry of Sports (Uzbekistan) =

Ministry of Uzbekistan

Ministry of Sports of the Republic of Uzbekistan
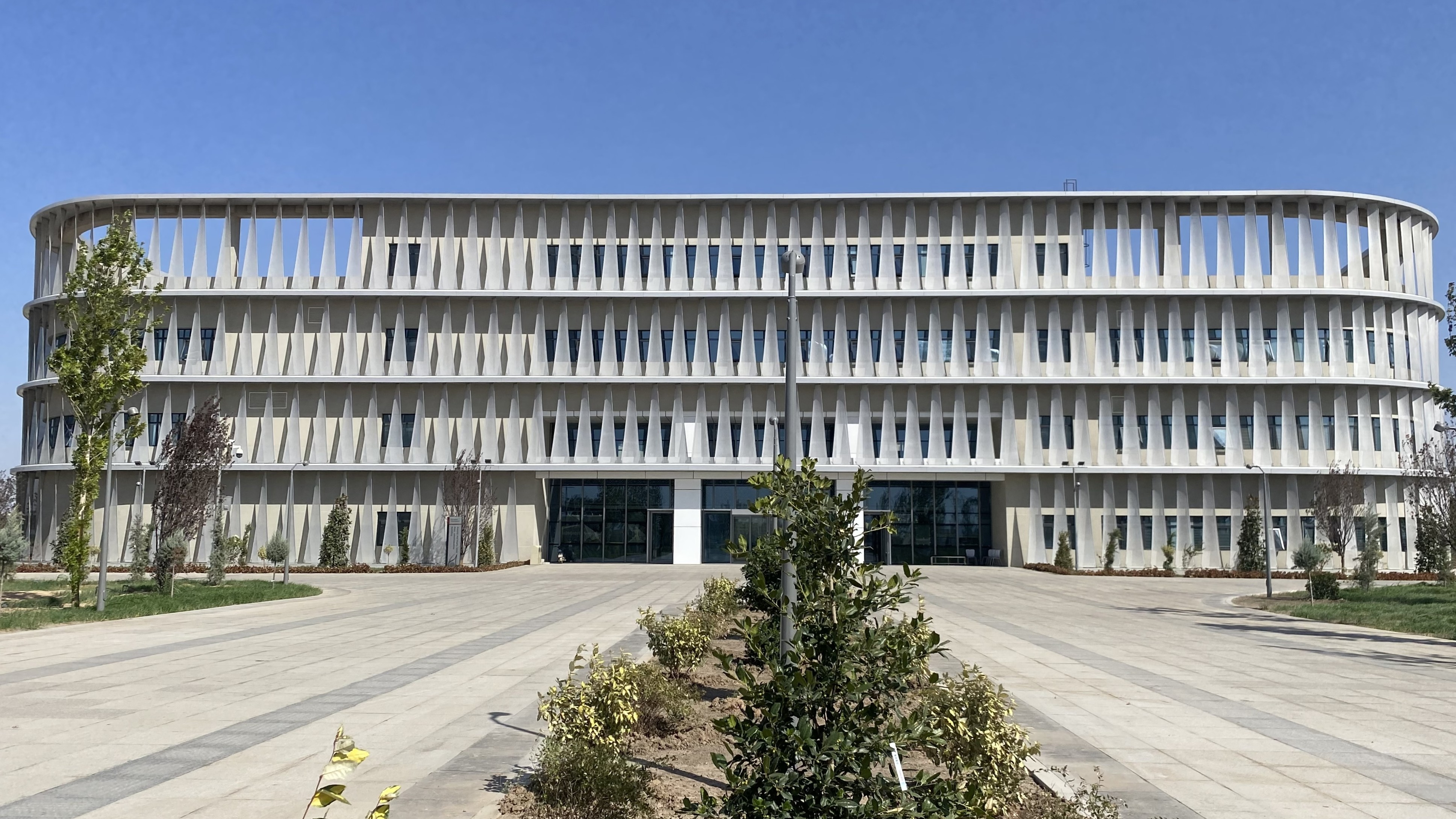
- Abbreviation: MoS
- Founded: January 20, 2024
- Type: Government ministry
- Legal status: Active
- Headquarters: 100202, Tashkent, Yashnobod District, Olympic village
- Coordinates: 41.323342°N 69.418615°E
- Official language: Uzbek
- Minister: Adkham Ikramov
- Deputy Minister: Murod Ismoilov
- Deputy Minister: Shahrullo Mahmudov
- Website: gov.uz/oz/sport

The Ministry of Sports of the Republic of Uzbekistan (Uzbek: Oʻzbekiston Respublikasi sport vazirligi) is a state administration body that implements state policy in the field of physical culture and sports in Uzbekistan.

== History ==
Established in 1994 as the State Committee for Physical Culture and Sports. Merged with the Ministry of Culture in 2001. Reorganized as the State Committee for Physical Culture and Sports in 2017. Transformed from a state committee into a ministry on March 5, 2018. President of Uzbekistan Shavkat Mirziyoyev announced on December 20, 2022, that the number of ministries and agencies in the country would be reduced from 61 to 28. The Youth Affairs Agency of Uzbekistan was attached to the newly established Ministry of Youth Policy and Sports. Adkham Ikramov was appointed minister.

In 2024, the Ministry of Youth Policy and Sports of the Republic of Uzbekistan was again transformed into the Ministry of Sports. The Youth Affairs Agency was transferred to the Cabinet of Ministers. The Ministry of Sports was re-established.

=== Ministers ===
Culture and Sports

- Alisher Azizkhodjaev (2004–2007)
- Rustambek Qurbonov (2007–2009)
- Anvar Jabborov (2009–2012)
- Tursunali Qoʻziyev (2012–2013)
- Minhojiddin Hojimatov (2013–2015)
- Bahodir Ahmedov (2015–2017)

Physical Culture and Sports

- Rustambek Qurbonov (2017–2018)
- Shoakrom Isroilov (2018)
- Dilmurod Nabiyev (2018–2021)

Tourism and Sports

- Aziz Abduhakimov (2021–2022)

Sports

- Adkham Ikramov (since 2022)

== Leadership ==
- Minister: Adkham Ikramov
- Deputy Minister: Murod Ismoilov
- Deputy Minister: Shahrullo Mahmudov
- Deputy Minister: Avazjon Karimov

== Organizational structure of the ministry ==
On April 7, 2023, the organizational structure of the ministry was expanded.

- The ministry consists of the following departments:
- Department of Sports Development
- Department of Olympic and Paralympic Sports
- Department of Physical Culture and Mass Sports
- Department of Sports Education and Scientific Research
- Department of Legal and Financial Management
