= Uzbekistan Football Association =

Governing body of association football in Uzbekistan

AFC
- Founded: 1946; 80 years ago
- Headquarters: Tashkent
- FIFA affiliation: 1994
- AFC affiliation: 1993 (Associate member) 1994
- CAFA affiliation: 2015
- President: Bakhodir Kurbanov
- Website: http://www.ufa.uz/oz

The Uzbekistan Football Association (Uzbek: Oʻzbekiston Futbol Assotsiatsiyasi) is the governing body of football in Uzbekistan, controlling the Uzbekistan national team.

== History ==
Uzbekistan Football Federation was founded in 1946.

On January 7, 2013, at a ceremony in Zurich, Switzerland, Uzbekistan football federation was awarded the prize FIFA Fair Play Award from FIFA. Uzbekistan Football Federation took also first place in points for the "Fair Play" among the AFC in 2012.

The federation organizes the Uzbek League, the second level Uzbekistan First League, Uzbekistan Second League, Uzbek Cup, UzPFL Cup and the Uzbek women's football championship.

The federation changed its nomenclature to Football Association on January 25, 2018.

Uzbekistan Football Federation logo before changing its nomenclature to Football Association

== Presidents ==
The head of Uzbekistan Football Association holds the position of president. As in other sports federations, since 1992, individuals who have held important roles in Uzbekistan's political elite have been elected to the presidency of the football federation. From 1992 to 1995, Abdulhashim Mutalov, who served as the Prime Minister of Uzbekistan, was simultaneously the head of the football federation.

For the next 10 years, Zokir Almatov, a colonel general who had served as the Minister of Internal Affairs of the Republic of Uzbekistan since 1991, led the association. In 2005, he resigned from this position due to health problems.

He was succeeded by senator Mirabror Usmanov. In 2017, Usmanov also left the position due to deteriorating health.

From 2017 to 2018, Umid Ahmadjonov, who was the chairman of the National Paralympic Committee of Uzbekistan, also became the president of the football association.

At the extraordinary report-and-election conference of the federation held on January 25, 2018, a decision was made to transform the Uzbekistan Football Federation (UFF) into the Uzbekistan Football Association (UFA). Achilbay Ramatov, chairman of Uzbekistan Railways state company, First Deputy Prime Minister, president of the Uzbekistan Boxing Federation, Hero of Uzbekistan, and senator, was elected president of the Uzbekistan Football Association.

On July 15, 2019, Abdusalom Azizov, chairman of the State Security Service of the Republic of Uzbekistan and a lieutenant general, was elected president of the UFA.

On February 13, 2025, the candidacy of Bakhodir Kurbanov, chairman of the State Security Service of the Republic of Uzbekistan and a colonel general, was nominated for the presidency of the football association. On February 22, 2025, Kurbanov was confirmed as president.

The current acting and executive head of the association is the First Vice President, a position held by Ravshan Irmatov since June 2019.

== Organizational structure ==
Management and Senior Management Bodies

- Congress: The supreme body of the UFA, attended by representatives of all member organizations and regional associations.
- Executive Committee: The executive body that provides overall leadership for the association's activities between competitions.
- President: The supreme leader of the UFA.
- First Vice President: The leader who coordinates daily organizational and strategic issues.
- Vice Presidents: Leaders responsible for areas.

Administration and Executive Office (Secretariat)

This structure, which operates under the leadership of the Secretary-General, organizes daily work. It includes the following main departments and divisions:

- National Team Center: Organizing training camps and matches for national teams of all ages (national, Olympic, youth, junior, women's teams).
- Technical Development Department: Responsible for the development of children's and youth football, the training of coaches, and the licensing system.
- International Relations Department: Establishing cooperation with FIFA, AFC and other foreign football federations.
- Competitions Organization Department: Coordination of cup matches, women's football and other internal competitions.
- Marketing and Commercial Department: Attracting sponsors, developing the football brand, and working with broadcasting rights.
- Press and media service: Ensuring relations with the public and the media.

Independent and Judicial Bodies

- Disciplinary Committee: Handles in-game violations and disciplinary matters.
- Appeals Committee: Examines appeals against decisions made by committees.
- Ethics Committee: Monitors compliance with the rules of fair play in football.
- Football Referees Center: An independent structure that trains referees, assigns them to matches, and evaluates their performance.

Regional and Auxiliary Structures

- Regional football associations: 14 local branches in the Republic of Karakalpakstan, the city of Tashkent and all regions.
- Uzbekistan Professional Football League (UzPFL): An independent structure that organizes domestic championships between professional clubs, such as the Super League, Pro League, and First League (operates separately from the UFA, but in cooperation with it).

=== Current personnel of the Executive Committee ===
- Bakhodir Kurbanov — Chairman of Uzbekistan State Security Service, President of UFA.
- Ravshan Irmatov — First Vice President of UFA.
- Odil Akhmedov — Vice President of UFA.
- Avazjon Karimov — advisor to the Minister of Sports.
- Oybek Kasimov — Vice President of National Olympic Committee.
- Avaz Azizkhodjaev — advisor to the President of UFA.
- Edita Mirabidova — Deputy Chairman of UFA Referees Committee.
- Kozimjon Kamilov — judge of Uzbekistan Constitutional Court.
- Bekzod Mamatkulov — president of Uzbekistan Futsal Federation.
- Diyor Imamkhodjaev — director general of Uzbekistan Professional Football League.
- Jakhongir Usmanov — member of AFC Futsal Committee.

=== Association staff ===
Name	Position	Source
(Uzbekistan) Bakhodir Kurbanov	President	
(Uzbekistan) Ravshan Irmatov	First Vice President	
(Uzbekistan) Odil Ahmedov	Vice President	
(Uzbekistan) Avaz Maksumov	General Secretary	
(Uzbekistan) Olimjon Salikhov	Treasurer	
(Uzbekistan) Sergey Arslanov	Technical Director	
(Uzbekistan) Fabio Cannavaro	Team Coach (Men's)	
(Uzbekistan) Bakhrom Norsafarov	Team Coach (Women's)	
(Uzbekistan) Davron Fayziev	Media/Communications Manager	
(Uzbekistan) Erkin Bakhtiyorov	Referee Coordinator	

== Competitions ==
Coordinates the activities of Uzbekistan national football team, Olympic team, youth teams (U-23 and U-20), junior team (U-17), amputee team, women's team, youth and junior women's national teams, and oversees the holding of competitions.

1. Uzbekistan national football team
2. Uzbekistan women's national football team
3. Uzbekistan national under-23 football team
4. Uzbekistan national under-20 football team
5. Uzbekistan national under-17 football team
6. Uzbekistan women's national under-20 football team
7. Uzbekistan women's national under-17 football team
8. Uzbekistan national futsal team
9. Uzbekistan women's national futsal team
10. Uzbekistan national beach soccer team

== Awards ==
Uzbekistan Football Association Awards Gala is an award ceremony hosted by The Football Association. The inaugural ceremony take place in December, in February or March before 2018. The 2015 Award ceremony took place on February 20, 2013. The 2015 Award ceremony was held on March 4, 2016.

=== Player of the Year ===
Year	Place	Player	Club	Points
2023	1	Abbosbek Fayzullaev	(Russia) CSKA Moscow	128
2023	2	Oston Urunov	(Uzbekistan) Navbahor	125
2023	3	Abdukodir Khusanov	(France) Lens	26
2024	1	Abbosbek Fayzullaev	(Russia) CSKA Moscow	138
2024	2	Abdukodir Khusanov	(France) Lens	137
2024	3	Utkir Yusupov	(Iran) Foolad	29
2025	1	Eldor Shomurodov	(Turkey) İstanbul Başakşehir	138

=== Young Player of the Year ===
Year	Player	Club
2010	Timur Khakimov	Pakhtakor
2011	Timur Khakimov	Pakhtakor
2011	Davlat Yarbekov	Pakhtakor
2011	Bobir Davlatov	Mash'al Mubarek
2012	Jamshid Boltaboev	RCOR Pakhtakor
2012	Otabek Shukurov	Mash'al Mubarek
2013	Izatilla Abdullaev	Pakhtakor
2013	Jamshid Boltaboev	Pakhtakor
2013	Akobir Turaev	FK Buxoro
2014	Islom Kenjaboev	Nasaf Qarshi
2015	Dostonbek Khamdamov	Bunyodkor
2017	Igor Chikrizov	Pakhtakor
2019	Jasur Jaloliddinov	Bukhoro
2025	Sadriddin Khasanov	Bunyodkor

=== Coach of the Year ===
Year	Place	Coach	Club	Points
2023	1	(Uzbekistan) Ravshan Khaydarov	Uzbekistan U-20	
2024	1	(Uzbekistan) Timur Kapadze	Uzbekistan U-23	
2025	1	(Uzbekistan) Timur Kapadze	Uzbekistan and Navbahor	

=== Youth Coach of the Year ===
Year	Name	Team
2010	Aleksey Evstafeev	Uzbekistan U-16
2011	Aleksey Evstafeev	Uzbekistan U-17
2012	Dilshod Nuraliev	Uzbekistan U-16
2013	Dilshod Nuraliev	Uzbekistan U-17
2014	Temur Alimkhodjaev	Uzbekistan U-16
2019	Ruziqul Berdiev	Nasaf Qarshi

=== Referee of the Year ===
Year	Referee	Notes
2006	Ravshan Irmatov	
2007	Ravshan Irmatov	
2008	Ravshan Irmatov	
2009	Ravshan Irmatov	
2010	Ravshan Irmatov	
2011	Ravshan Irmatov	
2012	Ravshan Irmatov	
2013	Ravshan Irmatov	
2014	Ravshan Irmatov	
2015	Ravshan Irmatov	
2019	Valentin Kovalenko	
2025	Ilgiz Tantashev	

=== Fair Play ===
Year	Club	Notes
2008	Bunyodkor	
2009	Bunyodkor	
2010	Bunyodkor	
2011	Sogdiana Jizzakh	
2012	Olmaliq FK	
2013	Lokomotiv Tashkent	
2014	Olmaliq FK	
2017	Kokand 1912	
2019	Nasaf Qarshi	
