= FC Kokand 1912 =

Kokand 1912 FK Qoʻqon 1912
- Full name: Профессиональный футбольный клуб "Коканд 1912"
- Nicknames: Kokandians; The Trailblazers
- Founded: 1912; 114 years ago
- Ground: Kokand Markaziy Stadium
- Capacity: 10,500
- League: Uzbekistan Pro League
- 2025: Uzbekistan Pro League, 12th
Home colours	Away colours

Club logo 2012—2017

Club logo 2017—2022

Kokand 1912 (Uzbek: Qoʻqon 1912 futbol klubi / "Қўқон 1912" футбол клуби) is an Uzbekistani professional football club from the city of Kokand. Founded in 1912, it is the oldest football club of the Central Asia. It plays in the Uzbekistan Super League.

== History ==
For the first time football entered the territory of modern Uzbekistan at the beginning of the 20th century. For the first time the soldiers of the Russian Empire began to play football in their free time, which were based in various cities of Central Asia, and the region of Central Asia was part of the Russian Empire as Russian Turkestan.

The inhabitants of the surrounding military fortifications of the Russian Empire, cities, and villages have expressed an interest to a new sport. Matches between soldiers watched a large number of onlookers. Special popularity of football is starting to happen among the local youth. The real goals at that time was only for soldiers. Gradually they began to imitate the playing fields as soldiers, and were able to make a homemade ball. The first ball for them was created by a local shoemaker, who used leather for the material, and inside the ball was stuffed with different fabrics. Shortly afterwards a few locals gathering together the necessary money, bought the Russian soldiers real ball. After the residents had a real ball, the popularity of football has grown even more.

In 1912, in Kokand formed the first football team consisting of local residents. It was the first football team in the history of Central Asia and Uzbekistan. First, this team plays matches with each other, and then begins to play with the teams of Russian soldiers. Gradually Kokand team is beginning to win team Russian soldiers, and sometimes with big bills. Soon after the success, opponent becomes a team of Kokand Ferghana military garrison. Match in Skobelev (now Ferghana) extends until in favor of team military of the garrison with minimal-sum game. After defeat, Kokand offer to play a return match, and a month later the match between the teams is repeated. The return match took place in Kokand, and ended with the victory of the Kokand team with a minimum score. A distinctive feature of this match was that the match was watched by a large number of spectators.

Soon after a series of successes Kokand team, in football are beginning to pay attention intelligentsia and wealthy people and merchants not only Kokand, but and the entire Ferghana Valley. Thanks to their efforts in the same 1912 created the first in the history of Central Asia and Uzbekistan's football team called "Muskomanda" (Muslim team). Later in the other cities and villages of the Ferghana Valley to create the local team. "Muskomanda" plays matches with these teams, making a sort of tour of the towns and villages of the Ferghana Valley.

=== Further development ===
The playing field for local enthusiasts set up without problems and the main problem be the balls and appropriate shoes. The problem with the balls decided by the members of the "Muskomanda" – brother Ruzimat and Ismail Niyazov's, who by profession was a shoemaker. They set up the production of homemade balls. Due to the high demand of balls among the teams of a large region, the brothers decide to expand production, and at the same time expand their workshop. The brothers, together with their employees, establish the production of not only balls, but also homemade shoes for football. After some time, the balls produced in Kokand are widely known throughout Central Asia, and even abroad. To brothers comes surprise made to order from Central Russia, and they send there ordered 400 (four hundred) balls.

The most famous players "Muskomanda" in 1910s were brothers Ruzimat and Ismail Niyazov's, Hasanjan Muhiddinov, brothers Akhunjan, Akbarjan and Muminjan Baymatov's. In the 1920s and in 1930s the main players "Muskomanda" was the work of the Kokand plant for the production of oil. Some of the most famous players of the period: M. Akhmedov, M. Abdullayev, A. Mukhiddinov, K. Muhiddinov, R. Niyazov, M. Baymatov, O. Baymatov, W. Shahniyazov, B. Usarov, M. Soliev, P. Haydarov.

=== USSR period ===
After the formation of the USSR (Soviet Union) and the establishment of the country's atheist ideology, the club is deprived of the name Muskomanda, and begins to be called simply Kokand. In 1926 in Uzbekistan the Uzbekistan SSR Championship on football begins carrying out, and till 1936 tournament is called the Championship of the cities of the Uzbekistan SSR. In this tournament, the Kokand team does not achieve much success, and the Champions are mainly the teams of Tashkent, and once the team of the city of Ferghana. Since 1937, the Championship of the cities of the Uzbekistan SSR is transformed into the Uzbekistan SSR Championship, and in that season Kokand becomes vice-champion. In the 1930s of football in Uzbekistan is experiencing unprecedented since the birth of rise. It was in those years that the Uzbekistan SSR football team was created, the basis of which was formed by Kokand players, along with the players of Tashkent teams.

In 1950-e years the club Kokand club is experiencing a small downturn. The club became part of the Uzbek sports society "Mehnat" (in Uzbek language for "Labor") and was renamed as such, mainly playing in the Uzbekistan SSR Championship. At that time, beside Kokand, Mehnat sports society also existed in Tashkent and other Uzbek cities. In 1958, the construction of the stadium Komsomol, designed for five thousand spectators, was completed in Kokand. In those years, the city formed a few more football teams, each of which consists of working different companies. These clubs become a kind of farm clubs of Mehnat, and the most talented players of these teams receive invitations from the main team of the city – Mehnat.

In 1968, Mehnat debuted in Class B of the USSR Championship Second League, and at the end of the season ranked 19th among 22 teams in the zone Central Asia. The following season, in 1969, Mehnat at the end of the season is on the 14th place among 24 teams in the area of Central Asia of class B of the Second League. From 1970 to 1987, Mehnat participated in the regional championship, and later in the Uzbekistan SSR Championship. In 1987, Mehnat for the first time and for the last time in its history becomes the winner of the Uzbekistan SSR Championship. Kokand at the same time the club also participates in the Uzbekistan SSR Cup, but the winner of this tournament never becomes.

In 1988, the club changes name to Avtomobilist (Motorist in translation from Russian language), and with that year begins the USSR Second League. At the end of the season, Avtomobilist ranks 13th among 19 teams in the seventh zone. In 1989, an Avtomobilist at the end of the season suddenly takes the 5th place among the 21 teams in the seventh zone of the Second League of the USSR. In the seasons 1990 and 1991 Avtomobilist is also involved in the Second League of the Soviet Union and the end of the seasons occupies the 7th and 14th places respectively.

Part of the team at the end of 1980s, during the participation of the club in the Second League of the USSR: the head coach — the Nerd Ayriev, players — Igor Usov, Aydinbek Aliyev, Igor Polishchuk, Sergei Calistru, Jamoliddin Tojiboev, Edvard Kudryashov, Dilshod Muminov, Alexander Golokolosov, Elvedin Ayupov, Nail Sagitov, Igor Golovanov, Damir Rakhmatullin, Zahid Nurmatov, Rustam Urazov, Numon Khasanov, Vitaly Avanesov, Andrei Timofeev, Vyacheslav Dervishev, Alexander Starikov, Yevgeny Matveyev, Michael Enns, Murad Qamchiev, Rustam Abdullaev, Andrei Yemanov, Murad Ismoilov, Alfred Dietrich, André Fedorov, Rodion Shamanaev.

=== Uzbekistan ===
After the dissolution of the USSR and the independence of Uzbekistan, since 1992 was held the national championship of the country – Uzbekistan Championship. In that year the club changed its name to Temiryulchi (Railroader in translation from Uzbek language). Temiryulchi was included in the Uzbekistan Higher League, and thus became one of the participants of the first draw of Uzbekistan Higher League. According to the results of the debut season, Kokand club took sixth place among seventeen teams. In that year, Temiryulchi also reached the final of the first draw of the Uzbekistan Cup, Namangan lost Navbahor with the score 6:5 on penalties (main and extra time ended in a draw with the score 0:0). That year Kokand club for the first time, and for the last time in its history reached the final of the Uzbekistan Cup. This is considered the best achievement of the club in the new period, during the independence of Uzbekistan.

Temiryulchi prior to 1995, participated in the Uzbekistan Higher League. In the season of 1995, finishing in the penultimate 15th place, relegated to the Uzbekistan First League. In the First League was delayed for two seasons, and in the season 1997, becoming the winner of this League, has returned to the Higher League. Until 2000 Kokand club participated in the Higher League. In the 2000 season taking the last 20-th place for the second time in its history, relegated to the First League.

In 2001, he again won the First League and returned to the Higher League. In 2002, the club changed its name to Kokand. In the seasons 2002 and 2003 participated in the Higher League, and in 2004, was not allowed to participate in the Higher League for non-payment of premium. In 2005 and 2006 participated in the First League, and in 2007 even participated in the Second League. The next two seasons again was a participant in the First League. In 2009, the club changed its name to Bunyodkor-Kokand. In 2010–2011, the club actually ceased to exist.

In 2012, the club was revived with the name Kokand 1912, and until 2014 participated in the First League. In 2014, having won the second place in the First League, I got the opportunity to participate in the Higher League again. Up to the present time participant of this League.

=== Name changes ===
Period	Name
1912–1925	Muskomanda
1925–1950	Kokand
1950–1987	Mehnat
1988–1991	Avtomobilist
1992–2001	Temiryulchi
2002–2008	Kokand
2009–2011	Bunyodkor-Kokand
2012 –	Kokand 1912

=== Domestic history ===
Season	League									Uzbek Cup	Top goalscorer		Manager
Season	Div.	Pos.	Pl.	W	D	L	GS	GA	P	Uzbek Cup	Name	League	Manager
1992	1st	6th	32	18	7	7	47	28	43	Runner-up	Rustam Abdullaev	18	
1993	1st	6th	30	13	5	12	36	34	31	Round of 32	Oydinbek Aliyev	12	
1994	1st	5th	30	16	4	10	50	42	36	Round of 16			
1995	1st	15th	30	6	3	21	26	67	21	Quarter-final			
1996	2nd	4th	52	32	7	13	112	62	103	First round			
1997	2nd	1st	42	27	9	6	101	39	90	Quarter-final			
1998	1st	7th	30	13	4	13	53	63	43	Round of 16			
1999	1st	10th	30	11	3	16	53	79	36	Not held			
2000	1st	20th	38	8	5	25	53	104	29	Round of 32			
2001	2nd	1st	32	27	5	0	78	24	86	Round of 16			
2002	1st	14th	30	10	2	18	31	60	32	Quarter-final			
2003	1st	10th	30	11	0	19	47	67	33	Round of 16			
2004	The club was suspended from attending in League due non-payment annual contribution fee.												
2005	2nd	3rd	30	18	5	7	49	31	59	-			
2006	2nd	18th	38	9	3	26	58	89	24	First round			
2007	3rd	1st								-			
2008	2nd	4th	34	19	8	7	56	30	65	-			
2009	2nd	1st	26	18	4	4	55	22	58	Second round			
2010/2011	Club did not exist.												
2012	2nd	9th	30	12	8	10	45	43	44	-			
2013	2nd	3rd	30	18	5	7	49	31	59	Round of 16			
2014	2nd	2nd	30	23	2	5	75	28	71	Round of 16	Otabek Khaydarov	25	
2015	1st	12th	30	9	4	17	31	52	31	Round of 16	Nosirbek Otakuziev	9	Rustam Abdullaev; Vadim Shodimatov (Interim)
2016	1st	12th	30	8	5	17	31	55	29	Quarter-final	Nosirbek Otakuziev	7	Numon Khasanov
2017	1st	9th	30	11	8	11	42	47	41	Quarter-final	Sukhrob Berdiev	11	Numon Khasanov
2018	1st	9th	20	7	7	6	21	14	28	Semi-final	Murod Kholmukhamedov	11	Numon Khasanov
2019	1st	11th	26	6	8	12	31	45	26	Second round	Murod Kholmukhamedov	8	Numon Khasanov
2020	1st	5th	26	13	3	10	35	28	42	Semifinal	Murod Kholmukhamedov	12	Bakhtiyor Ashurmatov
2021	1st	8th	26	9	9	8	37	36	36	Group stage	Ivan Josović; Sardorbek Azimov; Muhammadanas Hasanov	5	Bakhtiyor Ashurmatov

== Squad ==
As of 28 July, 2026 Note: Flags indicate national team as defined under FIFA eligibility rules; some limited exceptions apply. Players may hold more than one non-FIFA nationality.

No.	Pos.	Nation	Player
1	GK	UZB	Rustam Nartadzhiev
4	DF	UZB	Asliddin Toshtemirov
5	DF	UZB	Jasur Yakubov
6	DF	UZB	Alisher Salimov
7	MF	UZB	Javokhir Sidikov
8	MF	GEO	Shota Gvazava
9	MF	UZB	Javokhir Khusanov
10	FW	UZB	Shokhrukh Gadoev
11	FW	LBR	Sylvanus Nimely (on loan from Neftchi Fergana)
13	GK	UZB	Rakhimzhon Davronov
14	DF	UZB	Ibrokhim Yuldoshev
15	DF	UZB	Zafar Hakimov

No.	Pos.	Nation	Player
17	FW	UZB	Farkhod Sokhibzhonov (on loan from Neftchi Fergana)
18	MF	UZB	Mukhridin Pazildinov
19	FW	UZB	Shakhzod Akromov
20	MF	UZB	Ikboljon Malikjonov
21	MF	UZB	Gulyamkhaydar Gulyamov
22	FW	GEO	Toma Tabatadze
30	MF	UZB	Ibrokhim Mukhtorov
44	DF	GEO	Andro Giorgadze
46	GK	UZB	Hamzakhon Khodzhaev
69	FW	UKR	Yehor Kondratyuk
70	FW	UZB	Shokhrukh Makhmudkhozhiev
99	FW	UZB	Mukhammadanas Khasanov

== Honours ==
- Uzbekistan First League
  - Champions (3): 1997, 2001, 2009

== Managers ==
- (Uzbekistan) Tokhir Kapadze (2013–14)
- (Uzbekistan) Rustam Abdullaev (2014 – November 2015)
- (Uzbekistan) Vadim Shodimatov (interim) (November 2015 – 6 December 2015)
- (Uzbekistan) Murod Ismoilov (7 December 2015 – 16 May 2016)
- (Uzbekistan) Sergey Kovshov (16 May 2016 – 11 June 2016)
- (Uzbekistan) Numon Khasanov (11 June 2016 – 2019)
