= 2019 Uzbekistan Super League =

Twenty-eighth season of top level football in Uzbekistan

- Season: 2019
- Dates: 8 March — 30 November 2019
- Champions: Pakhtakor
- Promoted: Mash'al
- Relegated: Dinamo
- AFC Champions League: FC Pakhtakor Tashkent; Lokomotiv Tashkent; FC Bunyodkor
- Matches: 182
- Goals: 457 (2.51 per match)
- Best player: Dragan Ceran
- Top goalscorer: Dragan Ceran 23 goals
- Biggest home win: Pakhtakor 8–0 Qizilqum (21 June)
- Biggest away win: FC Buxoro 0–5 Pakhtakor (14 June); Qizilqum 0–5 Pakhtakor (30 July)
- Highest scoring: Pakhtakor 8–0 Qizilqum (21 June)
- Longest winning run: 16 match (Pakhtakor)
- Longest unbeaten run: 24 match (Pakhtakor)
- Longest winless run: 12 matches (Dinamo)
- Longest losing run: 12 match (Dinamo)
- Highest attendance: 25,727; Navbahor 3–1 Sogdiana (4 May)
- Lowest attendance: 867; Lokomotiv 3–1 Qizilqum (27 April)
- Total attendance: 1,008,399
- Average attendance: 5540
- All statistics correct as of 30 November 2019.

The 2019 Uzbekistan Super League (in Uzbek: Футбол бўйича 2019-йилги Ўзбекистон Суперлигаси, known as the Coca-Cola Uzbekistan Super League for sponsorship reasons) was the 28th season of top-level football in Uzbekistan since its establishment on 1992.

== Season events ==
Dinamo Samarkand has returned to the Super League.

On March 5, Coca-Cola Bottlers Uzbekistan became the title sponsor of Uzbekistan Super League and Cup for the 2019 season. Starting from this season, Uzbekistan Professional Football League determined the colors of the teams' kits for each round of matches. Press-service of the League closely cooperated with the Futbol TV HD channel. Also, one of the main sponsors of the 2019 Uzbekistan Super League of was the national export-import insurance company "Uzbekinvest".

On March 7, the season logo was approved. On March 8, the transfer window for Super League clubs officially closed. The first match of the season was held in Youth Sports Complex, Navoi. In it, Qizilqum played against Andijon, which returned to the elite after a short break. The first goal of the season was scored by Oybek Kilichev.

Pakhtakor scored 69 points (88.5%) out of a possible 78. Lokomotiv was the best defensive club this season, conceding 17 goals. Sogdiana finished the season with a goal difference of 0 (29–29). Navbahor finished the season with 11 draws. The most productive clubs were Pakhtakor (75 goals), Lokomotiv (40) and Bunyodkor (37 goals). Pakhtakor qualified for the group stage of the Asian Champions League. Lokomotiv and Bunyodkor qualified for the second qualifying round of Asian Champions League. Dinamo was relegated back to the Pro League. Lokomotiv Tashkent were the defending champions from the 2018 season.

== Teams ==
Location of teams in 2019 Uzbekistan Super League

| Club | Coach | Location | Stadium | Capacity | Kit sponsor | Shirt sponsor |
|---|---|---|---|---|---|---|
| AGMK | (Uzbekistan) Mirjalol Qosimov | Olmaliq | AGMK Stadium | 12,000 | Joma | OKMK |
| Andijan | (Russia) Alexander Khomyakov | Andijan | Soglom Avlod | 18,360 | Adidas | GM Uzbekistan |
| Bunyodkor | (Uzbekistan) Vadim Abramov | Tashkent | Bunyodkor Stadium | 34,000 | Nike | Uzbekistan GTL, Driver's Village^{1} |
| Bukhoro | (Tajikistan) Mukhsin Mukhamadiev | Bukhara | Bukhara Arena | 22,700 | Joma | BNQIZ |
| Kokand 1912 | (Uzbekistan) Numon Hasanov | Kokand | Kokand Stadium | 10,500 | Adidas | |
| Lokomotiv | (Uzbekistan) Samvel Babayan | Tashkent | Lokomotiv Stadium | 8,000 | Joma | Orient Finance Bank, Uztelecom^{1} |
| Metallurg | (Uzbekistan) Andrey Shipilov | Bekabad | Metallurg Stadium | 15,000 | Adidas | UMK |
| Nasaf | (Uzbekistan) Ruziqul Berdiyev | Qarshi | Qarshi Markazi Stadium | 16,000 | Adidas | Uzbekistan GTL SGCC |
| Navbahor | (Russia) Andrey Kanchelskis | Namangan | Namangan Markazi Stadium | 22,000 | Adidas | |
| Pakhtakor | (Georgia (country)) Shota Arveladze | Tashkent | Pakhtakor Stadium | 35,000 | Adidas | (Switzerland) Red Metal AG Amalco Group Company, Euroasia Insurance^{1} |
| Sogdiana | (Uzbekistan) Ulugbek Bakayev | Jizzakh | Soghdiana Stadium | 11,650 | Nike | UzbekEnergo |
| Qizilqum | (Uzbekistan) Hamidjon Aktamov | Zarafshan | Progress Stadium | 12,500 | Adidas | Navoi Mining and Metallurgy Combinat NKMK^{1} |
| Dinamo | (Turkmenistan) Täçmyrat Agamyradow | Samarqand | Dinamo Stadium | 13,800 | Joma | Agromir Buildings |
| Surkhon | (Uzbekistan) Andrei Miklyaev | Termez | Alpamish stadium | 6,000 | Adidas | UzbekGidroEnergo |

- ^{1} On the back of the strip.

=== Managerial changes ===
| Team | Outgoing manager | Manner of departure | Date of vacancy | Position in table | Replaced by | Date of appointment |
|---|---|---|---|---|---|---|
| Sogdiana | (Uzbekistan) Sergey Lushan | Resigned | 13 April 2019 | 12th | (Uzbekistan) Ulugbek Bakayev | 16 April 2019 |
| Andijon | (Uzbekistan) Ildar Sakaev | Resigned | 30 May 2019 | 11th | (Russia) Alexander Khomyakov | 3 June 2019 |
| Buxoro | (Uzbekistan) Bakhtiyor Ashurmatov | Resigned | 3 June 2019 | 13th | (Tajikistan) Mukhsin Mukhamadiev | 9 June 2019 |
| Lokomotiv | (Russia) Andrey Fyodorov | Resigned | 20 June 2019 | 2nd | (Uzbekistan) Samvel Babayan | 22 June 2019 |
| Navbahor | (Russia) Andrey Kanchelskis | Resigned | 20 June 2019 | 6th | (Serbia) Dejan Đurđević | 24 June 2019 |
| Navbahor | (Serbia) Dejan Đurđević | Resigned | September 2019 | 7th | (Russia) Andrey Kanchelskis | September 2019 |
| Dinamo | (Uzbekistan) Davron Fayziev | Resigned | 25 September 2019 | 10th | (Turkmenistan) Täçmyrat Agamyradow | 25 September 2019 |

== Foreign players ==
The number of foreign players is restricted to five per USL team. A team can use only five foreign players on the field in each game.

| Club | Player 1 | Player 2 | Player 3 | Player 4 | AFC players | Former players |
|---|---|---|---|---|---|---|
| AGMK | (Georgia (country)) **Elgujja Grigalashvili** | (Montenegro) Igor Zonjić | | | | (Serbia) Miroljub Kostić (Serbia) Marko Zoćević (Belarus) Uladzislaw Kasmynin |
| Andijan | (Serbia) Radosav Aleksić | (Ukraine) Vitali Myrnyi | | | | (Kyrgyzstan) **Akhlidin Israilov** |
| Bunyodkor | (Russia) Dmitriy Ostrovskiy | (Ukraine) Yevhen Chumak | | | | |
| Bukhoro | (Canada) Milovan Kapor | (Georgia (country)) **Jaba Lipartia** | (Georgia (country)) Vili Isiani | (Russia) Artyom Kulesha | (Tajikistan) **Fatkhullo Fatkhuloev** | (Montenegro) **Ivan Fatić** (Ukraine) Volodymyr Bayenko |
| Kokand 1912 | (Serbia) Marko Milić | | | | | (Serbia) Bojan Knežević (Serbia) Miloš Nikolić (France) **Olivier Bonnes** |
| Lokomotiv Tashkent | (Nicaragua) **Ariagner Smith** | (Serbia) **Jovan Đokić** | (Serbia) Igor Jelić | | (Turkmenistan) **Arslanmyrat Amanow** | (Serbia) Filip Rajevac |
| Metallurg Bekabad | (Russia) Andrei Shipilov | (Russia) Sergei Tumasyan | | | | |
| Nasaf | | | | | | |
| Navbahor | (Russia) Ivan Solovyov | (Russia) Igor Golban | (Serbia) Slavko Lukić | (Ukraine) Oleksandr Kasyan | (Tajikistan) **Amirbek Juraboev** | (Turkmenistan) **Elman Tagaýew** |
| Pakhtakor | (Montenegro) **Marko Simić** | (Serbia) Dragan Ćeran | | | | (Israel) Gidi Kanyuk |
| Soghdiana | (Georgia (country)) **Kakhi Makharadze** | (Serbia) Nikola Milinković | (Serbia) Milan Mitrović | | (Kyrgyzstan) **Sherzod Shakirov** | |
| Qizilqum | (Georgia (country)) **Mate Vatsadze** | (Georgia (country)) **Lasha Totadze** | (Russia) Yevgeni Cheremisin | (Russia) Ruslan Margiyev | (Australia) Steven Lustica | (Georgia (country)) **Elgujja Grigalashvili** (Nicaragua) **Ariagner Smith** |
| Dinamo | | | | | | |
| Surkhon | (Brazil) Dougllas Nascimento | (Brazil) Lucas Oliveria | (Serbia) Vladimir Bubanja | (Serbia) Darko Stanojević | | |

In bold: Players that have been capped for their national team.

== League table ==
| Pos | Team | Pld | W | D | L | GF | GA | GD | Pts | Qualification |
|---|---|---|---|---|---|---|---|---|---|---|
| 1 | Pakhtakor (C) | 26 | 22 | 3 | 1 | 75 | 18 | +57 | 69 | Qualification for AFC Champions League group stage |
| 2 | Lokomotiv (Q) | 26 | 13 | 10 | 3 | 40 | 17 | +23 | 49 | Qualification for AFC Champions League preliminary round 2 (Note: Since league champions Pakhtakor were also Uzbekistan Cup winners, the league 3rd place qualified for the AFC Champions League preliminary round 2.) |
| 3 | Bunyodkor (Q) | 26 | 12 | 7 | 7 | 37 | 33 | +4 | 43 | Qualification for AFC Champions League preliminary round 2 |
| 4 | Sogdiana | 26 | 11 | 7 | 8 | 29 | 29 | 0 | 40 | |
| 5 | Metallurg | 26 | 9 | 8 | 9 | 33 | 26 | +7 | 35 | |
| 6 | Surkhon | 26 | 10 | 5 | 11 | 26 | 33 | −7 | 35 | |
| 7 | Nasaf | 26 | 9 | 6 | 11 | 34 | 27 | +7 | 33 | |
| 8 | Navbahor | 26 | 7 | 11 | 8 | 26 | 23 | +3 | 32 | |
| 9 | AGMK | 26 | 9 | 5 | 12 | 36 | 37 | −1 | 32 | |
| 10 | Andijon | 26 | 6 | 10 | 10 | 23 | 37 | −14 | 28 | |
| 11 | Kokand 1912 | 26 | 6 | 8 | 12 | 31 | 45 | −14 | 26 | |
| 12 | Bukhoro | 26 | 5 | 9 | 12 | 18 | 37 | −19 | 24 | |
| 13 | Qizilqum | 26 | 5 | 9 | 12 | 24 | 48 | −24 | 24 | |
| 14 | Dinamo Samarqand (R) | 26 | 6 | 6 | 14 | 25 | 47 | −22 | 24 | Relegation to Uzbekistan Pro League |

Source: Uzbekistan Professional Football League
Rules for classification: 1) Points; 2) Goal difference; 3) Number of goals scored.
(C) Champions; (Q) Qualified for the phase indicated; (R) Relegated

=== 1 ===
| 8 March 2019 1 | Qizilqum | 1–1 | Andijon | Navoiy |
| UZT (UTC+5) | Qilichev 22' | Report | Joʻrayev 66' | Stadium: Yoshlar; Referee: Viktor Serazitdinov |

| 9 March 2019 2 | Dinamo | 1–1 | Nasaf | Samarqand |
| UZT (UTC+5) | Safarov 51' | Report | Saitov 12' | Stadium: Dinamo; Referee: Zokir Qodirov |

| 9 March 2019 3 | Surkhon | 1–1 | Metallurg | Termiz |
| UZT (UTC+5) | Hakimov 6' | Report | Otaxonov 89' | Stadium: Surxon; Referee: Ahrol Risqullayev |

| 9 March 2019 4 | AGMK | 0–0 | Buxoro | Olmaliq |
| UZT (UTC+5) | | Report | | Stadium: OKMK; Referee: Valentin Kovalenko |

| 10 March 2019 5 | Navbahor | 1–1 | Kokand 1912 | Toshkent |
| UZT (UTC+5) | Oʻrunov 22' | Report | Erkinov 68' | Stadium: TTYMI; Referee: Ravshan Irmatov |

| 10 March 2019 6 | Sogdiana | 2–1 | Bunyodkor | Jizzax |
| UZT (UTC+5) | Hakimov 6' | Report | Otaxonov 89' | Stadium: Soʻgʻdiyona; Referee: Temur Toʻxtasinov |

| 16 March 2019 7 | Pakhtakor | 3–1 | Lokomotiv | Toshkent |
| UZT (UTC+5) | Sergeyev 53'; Ćeran 62', 63' | Report | Amanov 74' | Stadium: Paxtakor; Referee: Sherzod Qosimov |

=== 2 ===
| 29 March 2019 1 | Qizilqum | 3–1 | AGMK | Navoiy |
| UZT (UTC+5) | Smith 1'; Grigalashvili 50', 69' | Report | Joʻrayev 44' | Stadium: Yoshlar; Referee: Aziz Asimov |

| 29 March 2019 2 | Metallurg | 2–0 | Buxoro | Bekobod |
| UZT (UTC+5) | Tumasyan 34'; Jeparov 74' | Report | | Stadium: Metallurg; Referee: Temur Toʻxtasinov |

| 30 March 2019 3 | Surkhon | 0–1 | Dinamo | Termiz |
| UZT (UTC+5) | | Report | Hakimov 2' | Stadium: Surxon; Referee: Sherzod Qosimov |

| 30 March 2019 4 | Lokomotiv | 1–0 | Navbahor | Toshkent |
| UZT (UTC+5) | Abduxoliqov 64' | Report | | Stadium: Lokomotiv; Referee: Viktor Serazitdinov |

| 31 March 2019 5 | Bunyodkor | 1–2 | Pakhtakor | Toshkent |
| UZT (UTC+5) | Mirahmadov 17' | Report | Hamdamov 35'; Ćeran 63' | Stadium: Paxtakor; Referee: Ravshan Irmatov |

| 31 March 2019 6 | Kokand 1912 | 0–0 | Andijon | Qoʻqon |
| UZT (UTC+5) | | Report | | Stadium: Istiqlol; Referee: Hasan Roʻziyev |

| 31 March 2019 7 | Nasaf | 3–1 | Sogdiana | Qarshi |
| UZT (UTC+5) | Saitov 7'; Davlatov 53'; Kenjaboyev 79' | Report | Amanov 74' | Stadium: Qarshi; Referee: Zokir Qodirov |

=== 3 ===
| 4 April 2019 1 | Lokomotiv | 4–0 | Andijon | Toshkent |
| UZT (UTC+5) | Ismoilov 50'; Jelić 72'; Abduxoliqov 72'; Iskanderov 89' | Report | | Stadium: Lokomotiv; Referee: Akobirxoʻja Shukurullayev |

| 5 April 2019 2 | Pakhtakor | 2–1 | Nasaf | Toshkent |
| UZT (UTC+5) | Bikmayev 12'; Krimets 90+3' | Report | Kozak 54' | Stadium: Paxtakor; Referee: Aziz Asimov |

| 6 April 2019 3 | Dinamo | 2–1 | Metallurg | Samarqand |
| UZT (UTC+5) | Toshpoʻlatov 19'; Loqayev 64' | Report | Muzaffarov 27' | Stadium: Dinamo; Referee: Ravshan Irmatov |

| 6 April 2019 4 | Navbahor | 2–3 | Bunyodkor | Fargʻona |
| UZT (UTC+5) | Kasyan 64'; Gʻulomov 79' | Report | Jaloliddinov 5'; Gʻiyosov 37', 85' | Stadium: Istiqlol; Referee: Ilgiz Tantashev |

| 6 April 2019 5 | AGMK | 7–1 | Kokand 1912 | Toshkent |
| UZT (UTC+5) | Polvonov 10', 37', 76', 80', 92'; Joʻrayev 33', 74' | Report | Xolmuhammedov 56' | Stadium: OKMK; Referee: Sherzod Qosimov |

| 7 April 2019 6 | Buxoro | 1–1 | Qizilqum | Buxoro |
| UZT (UTC+5) | Ibragimov 27' | Report | Smith 5' | Stadium: Buxoro; Referee: Ahrol Risqullayev |

| 7 April 2019 7 | Sogdiana | 0–3 | Surkhon | Jizzax |
| UZT (UTC+5) | | Report | Salomov 10', 14'; Hakimov 32' | Stadium: Soʻgʻdiyona; Referee: Vadim Agishev |

=== 4 ===
| 12 April 2019 1 | Metallurg | 4–1 | Qizilqum | Bekobod |
| UZT (UTC+5) | Andreyev 19'; Abdullayev 35', 38'; Abdurahimov 90+2' | Report | Qosimov 26' | Stadium: Metallurg; Referee: Sherzod Qosimov |

| 12 April 2019 2 | Nasaf | 0–1 | Navbahor | Qarshi |
| UZT (UTC+5) | | Report | Kasyan 31' | Stadium: Qarshi; Referee: Temur Toʻxtasinov |

| 13 April 2019 3 | Dinamo | 1–0 | Sogdiana | Samarqand |
| UZT (UTC+5) | Nurmatov 51' | Report | | Stadium: Dinamo; Referee: Olim Toʻychiboyev |

| 13 April 2019 4 | Bunyodkor | 1–0 | Andijon | Olmaliq |
| UZT (UTC+5) | Jaloliddinov 56' | Report | | Stadium: OKMK; Referee: Ahrol Risqullayev |

| 14 April 2019 5 | Surkhon | 0–0 | Pakhtakor | Termiz |
| UZT (UTC+5) | | Report | | Stadium: Surxon; Referee: Zokir Qodirov |

| 14 April 2019 6 | Lokomotiv | 2–1 | AGMK | Toshkent |
| UZT (UTC+5) | Abduxoliqov 43'; Toʻxtaxoʻjayev 45+1' | Report | Polvonov 4' | Stadium: TDTU; Referee: Ravshan Irmatov |

| 14 April 2019 7 | Kokand 1912 | 1–3 | Buxoro | Fargʻona |
| UZT (UTC+5) | Xolmuhammedov 68' | Report | Sobirjonov 25'; Ibragimov 40'; Nagayev 58' | Stadium: Istiqlol; Referee: Viktor Serazitdinov |

=== 5 ===
| 18 April 2019 1 | Andijon | 3–1 | Nasaf | Andijon |
| UZT (UTC+5) | Ubaydullayev 1'; Ahmedov 40', 57' | Report | Murtozoyev 18' | Stadium: Bobur; Referee: Ravshan Irmatov |

| 18 April 2019 2 | Pakhtakor | 2–0 | Dinamo | Toshkent |
| UZT (UTC+5) | Siddiqov 76'; Masharipov 81' | Report | | Stadium: Paxtakor; Referee: Jasur Muxtorov |

| 18 April 2019 3 | Buxoro | 0–2 | Lokomotiv | Buxoro |
| UZT (UTC+5) | | Report | Amanov 15'; Abduxoliqov 29' | Stadium: Buxoro SM; Referee: Vadim Agishev |

| 19 April 2019 4 | Qizilqum | 0–1 | Kokand 1912 | Fargʻona |
| UZT (UTC+5) | | Report | Xolmuhammedov 90' | Stadium: Istiqlol; Referee: Temur Toʻxtasinov |

| 20 April 2019 5 | AGMK | 0–1 | Bunyodkor | Olmaliq |
| UZT (UTC+5) | | Report | Toʻrayev 39' | Stadium: OKMK; Referee: Akobirxoʻja Shukurullayev |

| 21 April 2019 6 | Navbahor | 3–0 | Surkhon | Fargʻona |
| UZT (UTC+5) | Joʻraboyev 75'; Ahmedov 89'; Kasyan 90+3' | Report | | Stadium: Istiqlol; Referee: Viktor Serazitdinov |

| 21 April 2019 7 | Sogdiana | 2–1 | Metallurg | Jizzax |
| UZT (UTC+5) | Norxonov 24'; Orifov 64' | Report | Pardayev 76' | Stadium: Soʻgʻdiyona; Referee: Zokir Qodirov |

=== 6 ===
| 26 April 2019 1 | Dinamo | 2–2 | Navbahor | Samarqand |
| UZT (UTC+5) | Nurmatov 36'; Eminov 45' | Report | Lukić 25'; Kasyan 47' | Stadium: Dinamo; Referee: Ravshan Irmatov |

| 26 April 2019 2 | Nasaf | 4–0 | AGMK | Qarshi |
| UZT (UTC+5) | Murtozoyev 9', 14'; Davlatov 66'; Saitov 58' | Report | | Stadium: Qarshi; Referee: Valentin Kovalenko |

| 26 April 2019 3 | Buxoro | 2–2 | Bunyodkor | Buxoro |
| UZT (UTC+5) | Nagayev 48'; Ibragimov 52' | Report | Gʻiyosov 40', 69' | Stadium: Buxoro SM; Referee: Shavkat Nasibullayev |

| 27 April 2019 4 | Lokomotiv | 3–1 | Qizilqum | Toshkent |
| UZT (UTC+5) | Iskanderov 3'; Toʻxtaxoʻjayev 31'; Abduxoliqov 72' | Report | Đokić 71' (o.g.) | Stadium: Lokomotiv; Referee: Asker Najafaliyev |

| 27 April 2019 5 | Metallurg | 3–1 | Kokand 1912 | Bekobod |
| UZT (UTC+5) | Muzaffarov 35'; Andreyev 52'; Pardayev 80' | Report | Erkinov 28' | Stadium: Metallurg; Referee: Ahrol Risqullayev |

| 27 April 2019 6 | Sogdiana | 1–2 | Pakhtakor | Jizzax |
| UZT (UTC+5) | Milinković 89' | Report | Ćeran 73'; Masharipov 83' | Stadium: Soʻgʻdiyona; Referee: Sherzod Qosimov |

| 29 April 2019 7 | Surkhon | 0–0 | Andijon | Termiz |
| UZT (UTC+5) | | Report | | Stadium: Surxon; Referee: Ilgiz Tantashev |

=== 7 ===
| 1 May 2019 1 | Pakhtakor | 2–1 | Metallurg | Toshkent |
| UZT (UTC+5) | Ćeran 12', 37' | Report | Isoqjonov 11' | Stadium: Paxtakor; Referee: Akobirxoʻja Shukurullayev |

| 2 May 2019 2 | Lokomotiv | 2–2 | Kokand 1912 | Toshkent |
| UZT (UTC+5) | Abduxoliqov 4'; Turopov 28' | Report | Rustamov 30'; Erkinov 90' | Stadium: Lokomotiv; Referee: Hasan Roʻziyev |

| 4 May 2019 3 | Navbahor | 3–1 | Sogdiana | Namangan |
| UZT (UTC+5) | Lukić 8'; Kasyan 18', 31' | Report | Rashidov 90' | Stadium: Navbahor; Referee: Viktor Serazitdinov |

| 4 May 2019 4 | Buxoro | 0–1 | Nasaf | Buxoro |
| UZT (UTC+5) | | Report | Murtozoyev 65' | Stadium: Buxoro SM; Referee: Zokir Qodirov |

| 5 May 2019 5 | Andijon | 2–2 | Dinamo | Andijon |
| UZT (UTC+5) | Xusinov 16'; Ubaydullayev 45' | Report | Abdurahmonov 7'; Lokayev 87' | Stadium: Bobur; Referee: Vadim Agishev |

| 5 May 2019 6 | AGMK | 2–0 | Surkhon | Olmaliq |
| UZT (UTC+5) | Joʻrayev 41'; Shixov 88' | Report | | Stadium: OKMK; Referee: Jasur Muxtorov |

| 5 May 2019 7 | Qizilqum | 1–0 | Bunyodkor | Navoiy |
| UZT (UTC+5) | Grigalashvili 64' | Report | | Stadium: Yoshlar; Referee: Asker Najafaliyev |

=== 8 ===
| 10 May 2019 1 | Sogdiana | 2–1 | Andijon | Jizzax |
| UZT (UTC+5) | Nasriddinov 31'; Norxonov 68' | Report | Ubaydullayev 68' | Stadium: Soʻgʻdiyona; Referee: Hasan Roʻziyev |

| 10 May 2019 2 | Nasaf | 1–1 | Qizilqum | Qarshi |
| UZT (UTC+5) | Murtozoyev 51' | Report | Bobojonov 49' | Stadium: Qarshi; Referee: Sherzod Qosimov |

| 11 May 2019 3 | Dinamo | 1–0 | AGMK | Samarqand |
| UZT (UTC+5) | Abdurahmonov 48' | Report | | Stadium: Dinamo; Referee: Valentin Kovalenko |

| 11 May 2019 4 | Pakhtakor | 2–2 | Navbahor | Toshkent |
| UZT (UTC+5) | Ćeran 20', 53' | Report | Oʻrunov 59'; Isroilov 82' | Stadium: Paxtakor; Referee: Zokir Qodirov |

| 12 May 2019 5 | Bunyodkor | 2–1 | Kokand 1912 | Toshkent |
| UZT (UTC+5) | Gʻiyosov 13', 85' | Report | Berdiyev 64' | Stadium: Bunyodkor; Referee: Temur Toʻxtasinov |

| 12 May 2019 6 | Surkhon | 1–0 | Buxoro | Termiz |
| UZT (UTC+5) | Gʻofurov 23' | Report | | Stadium: Surxon; Referee: Ravshan Irmatov |

| 12 May 2019 7 | Metallurg | 0–0 | Lokomotiv | Bekobod |
| UZT (UTC+5) | | Report | | Stadium: Metallurg; Referee: Aziz Asimov |

=== 9 ===
| 16 May 2019 1 | Andijon | 0–3 | Pakhtakor | Fargʻona |
| UZT (UTC+5) | | Report | Ćeran 45+2'; Bikmayev 81', 85' | Stadium: Istiqlol; Referee: Shavkat Nasibullayev |

| 17 May 2019 2 | Lokomotiv | 0–0 | Bunyodkor | Toshkent |
| UZT (UTC+5) | | Report | | Stadium: Lokomotiv; Referee: Ahrol Risqullayev |

| 18 May 2019 3 | Nasaf | 2–0 | Kokand 1912 | Qarshi |
| UZT (UTC+5) | Murtozoyev 55', 57' | Report | | Stadium: Qarshi; Referee: Vadim Agishev |

| 18 May 2019 4 | Qizilqum | 1–3 | Surkhon | Navoiy |
| UZT (UTC+5) | Sanoyev 78' | Report | Stanojević 19'; Yusupov 38', 64' | Stadium: Yoshlar; Referee: Sherzod Qosimov |

| 19 May 2019 5 | AGMK | 0–2 | Sogdiana | Olmaliq |
| UZT (UTC+5) | | Report | Joʻrabekov 4'; Maxaradze 88' | Stadium: Bunyodkor; Referee: Asker Najafaliyev |

| 19 May 2019 6 | Navbahor | 0–0 | Metallurg | Namangan |
| UZT (UTC+5) | | Report | | Stadium: Navbahor; Referee: Ravshan Irmatov |

| 19 May 2019 7 | Buxoro | 0–0 | Dinamo | Buxoro |
| UZT (UTC+5) | | Report | | Stadium: Buxoro SM; Referee: Jasur Muxtorov |

=== 10 ===
| 25 May 2019 1 | Dinamo | 2–2 | Qizilqum | Samarqand |
| UZT (UTC+5) | Nurmatov 7'; Safarov 75' | Report | Sanoyev 14', 52' | Stadium: Dinamo; Referee: Ravshan Irmatov |

| 25 May 2019 2 | Surkhon | 2–1 | Kokand 1912 | Termiz |
| UZT (UTC+5) | Yusupov 10'; Stanojević 84' | Report | Berdiyev 22' | Stadium: Surxon; Referee: Viktor Serazitdinov |

| 25 May 2019 3 | Navbahor | 1–1 | Andijon | Namangan |
| UZT (UTC+5) | Ahmedov 79' | Report | Ibragimov 18' | Stadium: Navbahor; Referee: Ahrol Risqulloyev |

| 25 May 2019 4 | Metallurg | 0–2 | Bunyodkor | Bekobod |
| UZT (UTC+5) | | Report | Toʻxtasinov 35'; Mirahmadov 65' | Stadium: Metallurg; Referee: Jasur Muxtorov |

| 26 May 2019 5 | Pakhtakor | 4–1 | AGMK | Toshkent |
| UZT (UTC+5) | Sergeyev 5'; Ćeran 17'; Simić 32'; Bikmayev 76' | Report | Polvonov 49' | Stadium: Paxtakor; Referee: Vadim Agishev |

| 26 May 2019 6 | Sogdiana | 2–0 | Buxoro | Jizzax |
| UZT (UTC+5) | Norxonov 26', 55' | Report | | Stadium: Soʻgʻdiyona; Referee: Sherzod Qosimov |

| 26 May 2019 7 | Nasaf | 0–1 | Lokomotiv | Qarshi |
| UZT (UTC+5) | | Report | Abduxoliqov 21' | Stadium: Qarshi; Referee: Asker Najafaliyev |

=== 11 ===
| 15 June 2019 1 | Kokand 1912 | 2–2 | Dinamo | Qoʻqon |
| UZT (UTC+5) | Qosimov 20' (o.g.); Lokayev 46' (o.g.) | Report | Azimov 24', 29' | Stadium: Qoʻqon; Referee: Temur Toʻxtasinov |

| 15 June 2019 2 | Lokomotiv | 5–1 | Surkhon | Toshkent |
| UZT (UTC+5) | Toʻxtaxoʻjayev 16'; Đokić 27'; Amanov 67'; Abduxoliqov 74'; Amonov 88' | Report | Mahstaliyev 86' | Stadium: Lokomotiv; Referee: Vadim Agishev |

| 15 June 2019 3 | Qizilqum | 1–1 | Sogdiana | Navoiy |
| UZT (UTC+5) | Maxaradze 60' | Report | Grigalashvili 8' | Stadium: Yoshlar; Referee: Hasan Roʻziyev |

| 16 June 2019 4 | Andijon | 1–1 | Metallurg | Andijon |
| UZT (UTC+5) | Mamatkazin 38' | Report | Andreyev 79' | Stadium: Bobur; Referee: Zokir Qodirov |

| 16 June 2019 5 | Bunyodkor | 1–1 | Nasaf | Toshkent |
| UZT (UTC+5) | Karimov 8' | Report | Saitov 36' | Stadium: TDTU; Referee: Valentin Kovalenko |

| 16 June 2019 6 | AGMK | 1–1 | Navbahor | Olmaliq |
| UZT (UTC+5) | Norbekov 90' | Report | Kasyan 7' | Stadium: OKMK; Referee: Ilgiz Tantashev |

| 16 June 2019 7 | Buxoro | 0–5 | Pakhtakor | Buxoro |
| UZT (UTC+5) | | Report | Ćeran 32', 49', 76'; Alijonov 57'; Krimets 73' | Stadium: Buxoro SM; Referee: Shavkat Nasibullayev |

=== 12 ===
| 21 June 2019 1 | Dinamo | 2–1 | Lokomotiv | Samarqand |
| UZT (UTC+5) | Nurmatov 61', 72' | Report | Abduxoliqov 64' | Stadium: Dinamo; Referee: Olim Toʻychiboyev |

| 21 June 2019 2 | Pakhtakor | 8–0 | Qizilqum | Toshkent |
| UZT (UTC+5) | Bikmayev 7', 20'; Sergeyev 13', 62', 84'; Ćeran 45', 73'; Kozak 83' | Report | | Stadium: Paxtakor; Referee: Firdavs Norsafarov |

| 22 June 2019 3 | Andijon | 1–2 | AGMK | Andijon |
| UZT (UTC+5) | Ahmedov 32' | Report | Polvonov 18'; Nurmatov 73' | Stadium: Bobur; Referee: Jasur Muxtorov |

| 22 June 2019 4 | Sogdiana | 2–2 | Kokand 1912 | Jizzax |
| UZT (UTC+5) | Hasanov 2'; Shokirov 18' | Report | Berdiyev 9', 40' | Stadium: Soʻgʻdiyona; Referee: Zokir Qodirov |

| 23 June 2019 5 | Surkhon | 2–0 | Bunyodkor | Termiz |
| UZT (UTC+5) | Gʻofurov 19'; Bubanja 40' | Report | | Stadium: Surxon SM; Referee: Hasan Roʻziyev |

| 23 June 2019 6 | Navbahor | 3–1 | Buxoro | Namangan |
| UZT (UTC+5) | Shaymanov 14', 17'; Solovyov 87' | Report | Baenko 89' | Stadium: Navbahor; Referee: Sherzod Qosimov |

| 23 June 2019 7 | Metallurg | 0–1 | Nasaf | Bekobod |
| UZT (UTC+5) | | Report | Murtozoyev 84' | Stadium: Metallurg; Referee: Asker Najafaliyev |

=== 13 ===
| 28 June 2019 1 | Dinamo | 1–2 | Bunyodkor | Samarqand |
| UZT (UTC+5) | Baratov 63' | Report | Mirahmadov 30'; Gʻiyosov 87' | Stadium: Dinamo; Referee: Ahrol Risqullayev |

| 28 June 2019 2 | AGMK | 1–1 | Metallurg | Olmaliq |
| UZT (UTC+5) | Rahmonov 55' | Report | Jeparov 25' | Stadium: OKMK; Referee: Elyor Tursunov |

| 28 June 2019 3 | Qizilqum | 1–2 | Navbahor | Navoiy |
| UZT (UTC+5) | Smith 27' | Report | Kasyan 71', 79' | Stadium: Yoshlar; Referee: Jasur Muxtorov |

| 29 June 2019 4 | Lokomotiv | 2–0 | Sogdiana | Toshkent |
| UZT (UTC+5) | Mirzayev 88'; Iskanderov 90' | Report | | Stadium: Lokomotiv; Referee: Viktor Serazitdinov |

| 29 June 2019 5 | Kokand 1912 | 1–2 | Pakhtakor | Qoʻqon |
| UZT (UTC+5) | Erkinov 29' | Report | Mahmudhojiyev 78', 90' | Stadium: Qoʻqon; Referee: Vadim Agishev |

| 29 June 2019 6 | Nasaf | 2–0 | Surkhon | Qarshi |
| UZT (UTC+5) | Bozorov 78'; Murtozoyev 90' | Report | | Stadium: Qarshi; Referee: Temur Toʻxtasinov |

| 29 June 2019 7 | Buxoro | 1–0 | Andijon | Buxoro |
| UZT (UTC+5) | Shodmonov 42' | Report | | Stadium: Buxoro SM; Referee: Aziz Asimov |

=== 14 ===
| 26 July 2019 1 | Navbahor | 0–1 | Qizilqum | Namangan |
| UZT (UTC+5) | | Report | Vatsadze 7' | Stadium: Navbahor; Referee: Hasan Roʻziyev |

| 26 July 2019 2 | Pakhtakor | 3–1 | Kokand 1912 | Toshkent |
| UZT (UTC+5) | Masharipov 22'; Ćeran 48'; Simić 51' | Report | Hasanov 77' | Stadium: Paxtakor; Referee: Sherzod Qosimov |

| 26 July 2019 3 | Sogdiana | 1–0 | Lokomotiv | Jizzax |
| UZT (UTC+5) | Norxonov 90' | Report | | Stadium: Soʻgʻdiyona; Referee: Temur Toʻxtasinov |

| 27 July 2019 4 | Surkhon | 1–3 | Nasaf | Jizzax |
| UZT (UTC+5) | Yusupov 78' | Report | Gʻaybullayev 1'; Murtozoyev 62'; Narzullayev 89' | Stadium: Soʻgʻdiyona; Referee: Zokir Qodirov |

| 27 July 2019 5 | Bunyodkor | 4–2 | Dinamo | Toshkent |
| UZT (UTC+5) | Mirahmadov 26', 57'; Gʻiyosov 40', 45' | Report | Toshpoʻlatov 44', 75' | Stadium: TDTU; Referee: Firdavs Norsafarov |

| 27 July 2019 6 | Andijon | 2–0 | Buxoro | Andijon |
| UZT (UTC+5) | Qilichev 76'; Bekmurodov 90' | Report | | Stadium: Bobur; Referee: Vadim Agishev |

| 27 July 2019 7 | Metallurg | 2–1 | AGMK | Bekobod |
| UZT (UTC+5) | Mullajonov 31'; Pardayev 77' | Report | Polvonov 64' | Stadium: Metallurg; Referee: Shavkat Nasibullayev |

=== 15 ===
| 30 July 2019 1 | Kokand 1912 | 1–2 | Sogdiana | Qoʻqon |
| UZT (UTC+5) | Xolmuhammedov 8' | Report | Nagayev 1'; Maxaradze 63' | Stadium: Qoʻqon; Referee: Aziz Asimov |

| 30 July 2019 2 | Lokomotiv | 2–0 | Dinamo | Toshkent |
| UZT (UTC+5) | Abduxoliqov 56'; Smith 90' | Report | | Stadium: Lokomotiv; Referee: Akobirxoʻja Shukurullayev |

| 30 July 2019 3 | Qizilqum | 0–5 | Pakhtakor | Navoiy |
| UZT (UTC+5) | | Report | Krimets 11'; Simić 17'; Hamdamov 47'; Sergeyev 62', 77' | Stadium: Yoshlar; Referee: Viktor Serazitdinov |

| 31 July 2019 4 | Bunyodkor | 3–0 | Surkhon | Toshkent |
| UZT (UTC+5) | Qahramonov 36'; Qodirqulov 74'; Toʻxtasinov 90' | Report | | Stadium: Bunyodkor; Referee: Ahrol Risqullayev |

| 31 July 2019 5 | AGMK | 2–2 | Andijon | Olmaliq |
| UZT (UTC+5) | Polvonov 71'; Grigalashvili 81' | Report | Bahodirov 51'; Ubaydullayev 66' | Stadium: OKMK; Referee: Sherzod Qosimov |

| 31 July 2019 6 | Nasaf | 1–2 | Metallurg | Qarshi |
| UZT (UTC+5) | Bozorov 56' | Report | Pardayev 19', 42' | Stadium: Qarshi; Referee: Ilgiz Tantashev |

| 31 July 2019 7 | Buxoro | 0–0 | Navbahor | Buxoro |
| UZT (UTC+5) | | Report | | Stadium: Buxoro SM; Referee: Temur Toʻxtasinov |

=== 16 ===
| 10 August 2019 1 | Dinamo | 0–1 | Kokand 1912 | Samarqand |
| UZT (UTC+5) | | Report | Erkinov 1' | Stadium: Dinamo; Referee: Vadim Agishev |

| 10 August 2019 2 | Surkhon | 1–1 | Lokomotiv | Termiz |
| UZT (UTC+5) | Yusupov 75' | Report | Karimov 90' | Stadium: Surxon; Referee: Viktor Serazitdinov |

| 10 August 2019 3 | Navbahor | 0–1 | AGMK | Namangan |
| UZT (UTC+5) | | Report | Polvonov 54' | Stadium: Navbahor; Referee: Aziz Asimov |

| 10 August 2019 4 | Pakhtakor | 5–0 | Buxoro | Toshkent |
| UZT (UTC+5) | Sergeyev 6'; Bikmayev 12', 64'; Ćeran 23', 67' | Report | | Stadium: Paxtakor; Referee: Jasur Muxtorov |

| 11 August 2019 5 | Nasaf | 3–1 | Bunyodkor | Qarshi |
| UZT (UTC+5) | Gʻaniyev 26'; Abduholiqov 55'; Murtozoyev 90' | Report | Gadoyev 90' | Stadium: Qarshi; Referee: Zokir Qodirov |

| 11 August 2019 6 | Sogdiana | 1–0 | Qizilqum | Jizzax |
| UZT (UTC+5) | Norxonov 45' | Report | | Stadium: Soʻgʻdiyona; Referee: Ilgiz Tantashev |

| 11 August 2019 7 | Metallurg | 0–2 | Andijon | Bekobod |
| UZT (UTC+5) | | Report | Ubaydullayev 33'; Isoqov 90' | Stadium: Metallurg; Referee: Asker Najafaliyev |

=== 17 ===
| 17 August 2019 1 | Kokand 1912 | 2–1 | Surkhon | Qoʻqon |
| UZT (UTC+5) | Sindarov 6'; Xolmuhammedov 60' | Report | Salomov 37' | Stadium: Qoʻqon; Referee: Zokir Qodirov |

| 17 August 2019 2 | Lokomotiv | 1–0 | Nasaf | Toshkent |
| UZT (UTC+5) | Iskanderov 54' | Report | | Stadium: Lokomotiv; Referee: Temur Toʻxtasinov |

| 17 August 2019 3 | Buxoro | 1–1 | Sogdiana | Buxoro |
| UZT (UTC+5) | Fathulloyev 70' | Report | Norxonov 82' | Stadium: Buxoro SM; Referee: Hasan Roʻziyev |

| 17 August 2019 4 | AGMK | 0–3 | Pakhtakor | Olmaliq |
| UZT (UTC+5) | | Report | Kozak 7'; Yoʻldashov 68' (o.g.); Ćeran 79' | Stadium: OKMK; Referee: Elyor Tursunov |

| 18 August 2019 5 | Bunyodkor | 1–0 | Metallurg | Toshkent |
| UZT (UTC+5) | Gʻiyosov 75' | Report | | Stadium: Bunyodkor; Referee: Vadim Agishev |

| 18 August 2019 6 | Andijon | 0–1 | Navbahor | Andijon |
| UZT (UTC+5) | | Report | Turgʻunboyev 52' | Stadium: Bobur; Referee: Viktor Serazitdinov |

| 18 August 2019 7 | Qizilqum | 2–1 | Dinamo | Navoiy |
| UZT (UTC+5) | Joʻrayev 55'; Vatsadze 65' | Report | Azimov 76' | Stadium: Yoshlar; Referee: Sherzod Qosimov |

=== 18 ===
| 26 August 2019 1 | Bunyodkor | 1–1 | Lokomotiv | Toshkent |
| UZT (UTC+5) | Tursunov 74' | Report | Amanov 23' | Stadium: Bunyodkor; Referee: Viktor Serazitdinov |

| 26 August 2019 2 | Metallurg | 1–0 | Navbahor | Bekobod |
| UZT (UTC+5) | Muzaffarov 78' | Report | | Stadium: Metallurg; Referee: Sherzod Qosimov |

| 27 August 2019 3 | Kokand 1912 | 1–0 | Nasaf | Qoʻqon |
| UZT (UTC+5) | Xolmuhammedov 82' | Report | | Stadium: Qoʻqon; Referee: Temur Toʻxtasinov |

| 27 August 2019 4 | Dinamo | 0–3 | Buxoro | Samarqand |
| UZT (UTC+5) | | Report | Sidorov 69'; Qutiboyev 71'; Sulaymonov 73' | Stadium: Dinamo; Referee: Akobirxoʻja Shukurullayev |

| 27 August 2019 5 | Pakhtakor | 5–1 | Andijon | Toshkent |
| UZT (UTC+5) | Ćeran 41', 64', 68'; Sobirxoʻjayev 45'; Sergeyev 58' | Report | Gadoyev 90' | Stadium: Paxtakor; Referee: Firdavs Norsafarov |

| 27 August 2019 6 | Sogdiana | 1–0 | AGMK | Jizzax |
| UZT (UTC+5) | Maxaradze 80' | Report | | Stadium: Soʻgʻdiyona; Referee: Ahrol Risqullayev |

| 28 August 2019 7 | Surkhon | 2–0 | Qizilqum | Termiz |
| UZT (UTC+5) | Yusupov 67'; Norbekov 71' | Report | | Stadium: Surxon; Referee: Hasan Roʻziyev |

=== 19 ===
| 13 September 2019 1 | Andijon | 0–0 | Sogdiana | Andijon |
| UZT (UTC+5) | | Report | | Stadium: Bobur; Referee: Zokir Qodirov |

| 13 September 2019 2 | Buxoro | 0–2 | Surkhon | Buxoro |
| UZT (UTC+5) | | Report | Norbekov 47'; Yusupov 90' | Stadium: Buxoro; Referee: Temur Toʻxtasinov |

| 14 September 2019 3 | Qizilqum | 0–0 | Nasaf | Navoiy |
| UZT (UTC+5) | | Report | | Stadium: Yoshlar; Referee: Aziz Asimov |

| 14 September 2019 4 | AGMK | 3–1 | Dinamo | Olmaliq |
| UZT (UTC+5) | Grigalashvili 6', 65'; Hakimov 73' | Report | Safarov 87' | Stadium: OKMK; Referee: Jasur Muxtorov |

| 15 September 2019 5 | Kokand 1912 | 3–0 | Bunyodkor | Qoʻqon |
| UZT (UTC+5) | Mamatxoʻjayev 4'; Erkinov 54'; Xolmuhammedov 60' | Report | | Stadium: Qoʻqon; Referee: Hasan Roʻziyev |

| 15 September 2019 6 | Navbahor | 0–1 | Pakhtakor | Namangan |
| UZT (UTC+5) | | Report | Hamdamov 27' | Stadium: Navbahor; Referee: Ilgiz Tantashev |

| 15 September 2019 7 | Lokomotiv | 1–1 | Metallurg | Toshkent |
| UZT (UTC+5) | Toʻxtaxoʻjayev 41' | Report | Isoqjonov 64' | Stadium: Lokomotiv; Referee: Ahrol Risqullayev |

=== 20 ===
| 20 September 2019 1 | Kokand 1912 | 1–1 | Lokomotiv | Qoʻqon |
| UZT (UTC+5) | Berdiyev 35' | Report | Abduxoliqov 67' | Stadium: Qoʻqon; Referee: Zokir Qodirov |

| 20 September 2019 2 | Dinamo | 0–1 | Andijon | Samarqand |
| UZT (UTC+5) | | Report | Ubaydullayev 42' | Stadium: Dinamo; Referee: Hasan Roʻziyev |

| 20 September 2019 3 | Surkhon | 1–0 | AGMK | Termiz |
| UZT (UTC+5) | Ismoilov 70' | Report | | Stadium: Surxon; Referee: Viktor Serazitdinov |

| 21 September 2019 4 | Metallurg | 1–2 | Pakhtakor | Bekobod |
| UZT (UTC+5) | Otaxonov 26' | Report | Abdullayev 77'; Hamdamov 78' | Stadium: Metallurg; Referee: Ravshan Abduvohidov |

| 21 September 2019 5 | Sogdiana | 0–0 | Navbahor | Jizzax |
| UZT (UTC+5) | | Report | | Stadium: Soʻgʻdiyona; Referee: Vadim Agishev |

| 22 September 2019 6 | Bunyodkor | 2–1 | Qizilqum | Toshkent |
| UZT (UTC+5) | Mirahmadov 24'; Abdullayev 29' | Report | Abdullajonov 87' | Stadium: Bunyodkor; Referee: Rustam Lutfullin |

| 22 September 2019 7 | Nasaf | 1–2 | Buxoro | Termiz |
| UZT (UTC+5) | Muhiddinov 68' | Report | Sobirjonov 45'; Qutiboyev 75' | Stadium: Surxon; Referee: Valentin Kovalenko |

=== 21 ===
| 30 September 2019 1 | Kokand 1912 | 2–3 | Metallurg | Qoʻqon |
| UZT (UTC+5) | Haydarov 7'; Ahmedov 29' | Report | Muzaffarov 48'; Abdullayev 54'; Abdurahimov 80' | Stadium: Qoʻqon; Referee: Ilgiz Tantashev |

| 30 September 2019 2 | AGMK | 2–1 | Nasaf | Olmaliq |
| UZT (UTC+5) | Nurmatov 10'; Boydullayev 90' | Report | Abduholiqov 34' | Stadium: OKMK; Referee: Asker Najafaliyev |

| 30 September 2019 3 | Bunyodkor | 1–1 | Buxoro | Toshkent |
| UZT (UTC+5) | Mirahmadov 40' | Report | Ubaydullayev 54' | Stadium: Bunyodkor; Referee: Jasur Muxtorov |

| 1 October 2019 4 | Pakhtakor | 3–0 | Sogdiana | Olmaliq |
| UZT (UTC+5) | Sergeyev 21', 55'; Hamdamov 89' | Report | | Stadium: Paxtakor; Referee: Olim Toʻychiboyev |

| 1 October 2019 5 | Qizilqum | 1–1 | Lokomotiv | Navoiy |
| UZT (UTC+5) | Totadze 61' | Report | Toʻxtaxoʻjaev 90' | Stadium: Yoshlar; Referee: Hasan Roʻziyev |

| 1 October 2019 6 | Navbahor | 1–0 | Dinamo | Namangan |
| UZT (UTC+5) | Kasyan 73' | Report | | Stadium: Navbahor; Referee: Sherzod Qosimov |

| 2 October 2019 7 | Andijon | 2–1 | Surkhon | Toshkent |
| UZT (UTC+5) | Ubaydullayev 15', 25' | Report | Nascimento 19' | Stadium: Lokomotiv; Referee: Aziz Asimov |

=== 22 ===
| 18 October 2019 1 | Kokand 1912 | 1–2 | Qizilqum | Qoʻqon |
| UZT (UTC+5) | Abduhamidov 25' | Report | Mustafoyev 45+2'; Lustica 67' | Stadium: Qoʻqon; Referee: Temur Toʻxtasinov |

| 18 October 2019 2 | Metallurg | 0–1 | Sogdiana | Bekobod |
| UZT (UTC+5) | | Report | Rashidov 37' | Stadium: Metallurg; Referee: Viktor Serazitdinov |

| 18 October 2019 3 | Bunyodkor | 0–2 | AGMK | Toshkent |
| UZT (UTC+5) | | Report | Toshmatov 29'; Yoʻldashov 45+2' | Stadium: Bunyodkor; Referee: Akobirxoʻja Shukurullayev |

| 19 October 2019 4 | Surkhon | 0–0 | Navbahor | Termiz |
| UZT (UTC+5) | | Report | | Stadium: Surxon; Referee: Zokir Qodirov |

| 19 October 2019 5 | Lokomotiv | 2–0 | Buxoro | Jizzax |
| UZT (UTC+5) | Zoteyev 62'; Turopov 90' | Report | | Stadium: Lokomotiv; Referee: Firdavs Norsafarov |

| 19 October 2019 6 | Dinamo | 1–4 | Pakhtakor | Samarqand |
| UZT (UTC+5) | Qosimov 28' | Report | Sobirxoʻjayev 45'; Sergeyev 45+2'; Hamdamov 75', 82' | Stadium: Dinamo; Referee: Ahrol Risqullayev |

| 19 October 2019 7 | Nasaf | 3–0 | Andijon | Qarshi |
| UZT (UTC+5) | Murtozoyev 13', 65'; Bozorov 90+1' | Report | | Stadium: Qarshi; Referee: Sherzod Qosimov |

=== 23 ===
| 29 October 2019 1 | Sogdiana | 3–0 | Dinamo | Jizzax |
| UZT (UTC+5) | Rashidov 50'; Norxonov 60'; Kulmatov 70' | Report | | Referee: Sherzod Qosimov |

| 30 October 2019 2 | Qizilqum | 1–1 | Metallurg | Navoiy |
| UZT (UTC+5) | Totadze 51' | Report | Andreyev 47' | Stadium: Yoshlar; Referee: Valentin Kovalenko |

| 30 October 2019 3 | Buxoro | 0–1 | Kokand 1912 | Navoiy |
| UZT (UTC+5) | | Report | Xolmuhammedov 28' | Stadium: Yoshlar; Referee: Vadim Agishev |

| 30 October 2019 4 | Andijon | 1–1 | Bunyodkor | Andijon |
| UZT (UTC+5) | Ubaydullayev 90' | Report | Toʻxtasinov 90' | Stadium: Bobur; Referee: Ilgiz Tantashev |

| 31 October 2019 5 | AGMK | 1–1 | Lokomotiv | Toshkent |
| UZT (UTC+5) | Grigalashvili 81' | Report | Iskanderov 36' | Stadium: Lokomotiv; Referee: Jasur Muxtorov |

| 31 October 2019 6 | Navbahor | 1–1 | Nasaf | Namangan |
| UZT (UTC+5) | Ibragimov 36' | Report | Abduholiqov 90' | Stadium: Navbahor; Referee: Jasur Muxtorov |

| 31 October 2019 7 | Pakhtakor | 3–1 | Surkhon | Toshkent |
| UZT (UTC+5) | Ćeran 12'; Sergeyev 32', 70' | Report | Salomov 62' | Stadium: Paxtakor; Referee: Asker Najafaliyev |

=== 24 ===
| 23 November 2019 1 | Nasaf | 1–2 | Pakhtakor | Qarshi |
| UZT (UTC+5) | Bozorov 50' | Report | Sergeyev 37'; Masharipov 42' | Stadium: Qarshi; Referee: Olim Toʻychiboyev |

| 23 November 2019 2 | Kokand 1912 | 1–3 | AGMK | Qoʻqon |
| UZT (UTC+5) | Roʻziyev 90' | Report | Polvonov 26'; Qosimov 29'; Grigalashvili 69' | Stadium: Qoʻqon; Referee: Sherzod Qosimov |

| 23 November 2019 3 | Metallurg | 5–0 | Dinamo | Bekobod |
| UZT (UTC+5) | Tojiyev 66'; Abdullayev 70'; Isoqjonov 76'; Muzaffarov 88'; Toshqoʻziyev 90' | Report | | Stadium: Metallurg; Referee: Jasur Muxtorov |

| 23 November 2019 4 | Qizilqum | 1–1 | Buxoro | Navoiy |
| UZT (UTC+5) | Shodiyev 32' | Report | Bobojonov 45' | Stadium: Yoshlar; Referee: Akobirxoʻja Shukurullayev |

| 24 November 2019 5 | Andijon | 0–4 | Lokomotiv | Andijon |
| UZT (UTC+5) | | Report | Iskanderov 40'; Urunov 68'; Mirzayev 70'; Rahmatullayev 88' | Stadium: Bobur; Referee: Rustam Lutfullin |

| 24 November 2019 6 | Surkhon | 1–0 | Sogdiana | Termiz |
| UZT (UTC+5) | Stanojević 63' | Report | | Stadium: Surxon; Referee: Viktor Serazitdinov |

| 24 November 2019 7 | Bunyodkor | 2–1 | Navbahor | Toshkent |
| UZT (UTC+5) | Toʻxtasinov 9'; Gʻiyosov 67' | Report | Turgʻunboyev 34' | Stadium: Bunyodkor; Referee: Firdavs Norsafarov |

=== 25 ===
| 27 November 2019 1 | Buxoro | 0–0 | Metallurg | Buxoro |
| UZT (UTC+5) | | Report | | Stadium: Buxoro; Referee: Viktor Serazitdinov |

| 27 November 2019 2 | AGMK | 4–1 | Qizilqum | Olmaliq |
| UZT (UTC+5) | Grigalashvili 9'; Polvonov 56', 68', 77' | Report | Vatsadze 15' | Stadium: OKMK; Referee: Asker Najafaliyev |

| 27 November 2019 3 | Navbahor | 0–1 | Lokomotiv | Namangan |
| UZT (UTC+5) | | Report | Mirzayev 59' | Stadium: Navbahor; Referee: Temur Toʻxtasinov |

| 27 November 2019 4 | Andijon | 1–1 | Kokand 1912 | Andijon |
| UZT (UTC+5) | Mamatkazin 90' | Report | Roʻziyev 44' | Stadium: Bobur; Referee: Vadim Agishev |

| 27 November 2019 5 | Pakhtakor | 2–3 | Bunyodkor | Toshkent |
| UZT (UTC+5) | Sergeyev 39', 67' | Report | Toʻxtasinov 11'; Qahramonov 24'; Gʻiyosov 90' | Stadium: Bunyodkor; Referee: Jasur Muxtorov |

| 27 November 2019 6 | Sogdiana | 1–1 | Nasaf | Jizzax |
| UZT (UTC+5) | Norxonov 63' | Report | Murtozoyev 10' | Stadium: Soʻgʻdiyona; Referee: Zokir Qodirov |

| 27 November 2019 7 | Dinamo | 2–1 | Surkhon | Samarqand |
| UZT (UTC+5) | Nasimov 68'; Toshpoʻlatov 76' | Report | Yusupov 84' | Stadium: Dinamo; Referee: Hasan Roʻziyev |

=== 26 ===
| 30 November 2019 1 | Lokomotiv | 0–0 | Pakhtakor | Toshkent |
| UZT (UTC+5) | | Report | | Stadium: Lokomotiv; Referee: Elyor Tursunov |

| 30 November 2019 2 | Buxoro | 2–1 | AGMK | Buxoro |
| UZT (UTC+5) | Bobojonov 18'; Shodmonov 90+2' | Report | Grigalashvili 15' | Stadium: Buxoro; Referee: Jasur Muxtorov |

| 30 November 2019 3 | Nasaf | 1–2 | Dinamo | Qarshi |
| UZT (UTC+5) | Gʻaniyev 79' | Report | Safarov 55'; Hakimov 74' | Stadium: Qarshi; Referee: Vadim Agishev |

| 30 November 2019 4 | Kokand 1912 | 1–1 | Navbahor | Qoʻqon |
| UZT (UTC+5) | Berdiyev 17' | Report | Turgʻunboyev 18' | Stadium: Qoʻqon; Referee: Zokir Qodirov |

| 30 November 2019 5 | Metallurg | 2–0 | Surkhon | Bekobod |
| UZT (UTC+5) | Andreyev 22'; Toshqoʻziyev 30' | Report | | Stadium: Metallurg; Referee: Ravshan Abduvohidov |

| 30 November 2019 6 | Bunyodkor | 2–2 | Sogdiana | Toshkent |
| UZT (UTC+5) | Qobilov 41'; Toʻxtasinov 60' | Report | Qobilov 61' (o.g.); Maxaradze 75' | Stadium: Bunyodkor; Referee: Temur Toʻxtasinov |

| 30 November 2019 7 | Andijon | 1–0 | Qizilqum | Andijon |
| UZT (UTC+5) | Olimov 75' | Report | | Stadium: Bobur; Referee: Viktor Serazitdinov |

== Positions by round ==
| Team ╲ Round | 1 | 2 | 3 | 4 | 5 | 6 | 7 | 8 | 9 | 10 | 11 | 12 | 13 | 14 | 15 | 16 | 17 | 18 | 19 | 20 | 21 | 22 | 23 | 24 | 25 | 26 |
|---|---|---|---|---|---|---|---|---|---|---|---|---|---|---|---|---|---|---|---|---|---|---|---|---|---|---|
| Pakhtakor | 1 | 1 | 1 | 1 | 1 | 1 | 1 | 1 | 1 | 1 | 1 | 1 | 1 | 1 | 1 | 1 | 1 | 1 | 1 | 1 | 1 | 1 | 1 | 1 | 1 | 1 |
| Lokomotiv | 14 | 7 | 3 | 2 | 2 | 2 | 2 | 2 | 2 | 2 | 2 | 2 | 2 | 2 | 2 | 2 | 2 | 2 | 2 | 2 | 2 | 2 | 2 | 2 | 2 | 2 |
| Bunyodkor | 13 | 14 | 9 | 6 | 3 | 4 | 6 | 3 | 5 | 4 | 3 | 6 | 5 | 4 | 3 | 3 | 3 | 3 | 3 | 3 | 3 | 3 | 4 | 3 | 3 | 3 |
| Sogdiana | 2 | 6 | 10 | 12 | 8 | 11 | 13 | 10 | 9 | 5 | 5 | 8 | 8 | 7 | 5 | 5 | 5 | 4 | 4 | 4 | 4 | 4 | 3 | 4 | 4 | 4 |
| Metallurg | 6 | 4 | 7 | 4 | 5 | 3 | 4 | 7 | 8 | 9 | 9 | 9 | 9 | 9 | 8 | 8 | 8 | 8 | 8 | 8 | 8 | 8 | 8 | 7 | 7 | 5 |
| Surkhon | 10 | 5 | 2 | 3 | 4 | 5 | 8 | 6 | 3 | 3 | 4 | 3 | 6 | 6 | 7 | 7 | 7 | 7 | 6 | 5 | 5 | 5 | 6 | 5 | 5 | 6 |
| Nasaf | 7 | 2 | 6 | 10 | 14 | 8 | 5 | 8 | 4 | 7 | 7 | 5 | 4 | 3 | 4 | 4 | 4 | 5 | 5 | 6 | 7 | 6 | 5 | 6 | 6 | 7 |
| AGMK | 11 | 12 | 5 | 9 | 13 | 14 | 10 | 11 | 11 | 12 | 12 | 10 | 10 | 11 | 11 | 10 | 12 | 12 | 10 | 11 | 10 | 9 | 9 | 9 | 8 | 8 |
| Navbahor | 8 | 11 | 14 | 11 | 6 | 6 | 3 | 4 | 6 | 6 | 6 | 4 | 3 | 5 | 6 | 6 | 6 | 6 | 7 | 7 | 6 | 7 | 7 | 8 | 9 | 9 |
| Andijon | 3 | 8 | 12 | 13 | 11 | 10 | 11 | 12 | 13 | 11 | 11 | 12 | 13 | 12 | 12 | 11 | 11 | 13 | 13 | 10 | 9 | 10 | 10 | 11 | 11 | 10 |
| Kokand | 5 | 9 | 13 | 14 | 12 | 13 | 14 | 14 | 14 | 14 | 14 | 13 | 14 | 14 | 14 | 14 | 13 | 10 | 9 | 9 | 11 | 12 | 11 | 10 | 10 | 11 |
| Bukhoro | 12 | 13 | 11 | 7 | 10 | 9 | 12 | 13 | 12 | 13 | 13 | 14 | 12 | 13 | 13 | 13 | 14 | 14 | 14 | 13 | 12 | 13 | 13 | 13 | 13 | 12 |
| Qizilqum | 9 | 3 | 4 | 8 | 9 | 12 | 9 | 9 | 10 | 10 | 10 | 11 | 11 | 10 | 10 | 12 | 10 | 11 | 12 | 14 | 13 | 11 | 12 | 12 | 12 | 13 |
| Dinamo | 4 | 10 | 8 | 5 | 7 | 7 | 7 | 5 | 7 | 8 | 8 | 7 | 7 | 8 | 9 | 9 | 9 | 9 | 11 | 12 | 14 | 14 | 14 | 14 | 14 | 14 |

| Leader and qualification to AFC Champions League group stage |
| Qualification to AFC Champions League preliminary round 2 |
| Qualification to AFC Champions League preliminary round 3 |
| Relegation to Uzbekistan Pro League |

Updated to match(es) played on 30 November 2019. Source: Uzbekistan Professional Football League

== Results ==
| Home \ Away | AGM | AND | BUK | BUN | KOK | LOK | MET | NAS | NAV | PAK | QIZ | SOG | DIN | SUR |
|---|---|---|---|---|---|---|---|---|---|---|---|---|---|---|
| AGMK | — | 2–2 | 0–0 | 0–1 | 7–1 | 1–1 | 1–1 | 2–1 | 1–1 | 0–3 | 4–1 | 0–2 | 3–1 | 2–0 |
| Andijon | 1–2 | — | 2–0 | 1–1 | 1–1 | 0–4 | 1–1 | 3–1 | 0–1 | 0–3 | 1–0 | 0–0 | 2–2 | 2–1 |
| Bukhoro | 2–1 | 1–0 | — | 2–2 | 0–1 | 0–2 | 0–0 | 0–1 | 0–0 | 0–5 | 1–1 | 1–1 | 0–0 | 0–2 |
| Bunyodkor | 0–2 | 1–0 | 1–1 | — | 2–1 | 1–1 | 1–0 | 1–1 | 2–1 | 1–2 | 2–1 | 2–2 | 4–2 | 3–0 |
| Kokand | 1–3 | 0–0 | 1–3 | 3–0 | — | 1–1 | 2–3 | 1–0 | 1–1 | 1–2 | 1–2 | 1–2 | 2–2 | 2–1 |
| Lokomotiv | 2–1 | 4–0 | 2–0 | 0–0 | 2–2 | — | 1–1 | 1–0 | 1–0 | 0–0 | 3–1 | 2–0 | 2–0 | 5–1 |
| Metallurg | 2–1 | 0–2 | 2–0 | 0–2 | 3–1 | 0–0 | — | 0–1 | 1–0 | 1–2 | 4–1 | 0–1 | 5–0 | 2–0 |
| Nasaf | 4–0 | 3–0 | 1–2 | 3–1 | 2–0 | 0–1 | 1–2 | — | 0–1 | 1–2 | 1–1 | 3–1 | 1–2 | 2–0 |
| Navbahor | 0–1 | 1–1 | 3–1 | 2–3 | 1–1 | 0–1 | 0–0 | 1–1 | — | 0–1 | 0–1 | 3–1 | 1–0 | 3–0 |
| Pakhtakor | 4–1 | 5–1 | 5–0 | 2–3 | 3–1 | 3–1 | 2–1 | 2–1 | 2–2 | — | 8–0 | 3–0 | 2–0 | 3–1 |
| Qizilqum | 3–1 | 1–1 | 1–1 | 1–0 | 0–1 | 1–1 | 1–1 | 0–0 | 1–2 | 0–5 | — | 1–1 | 2–1 | 1–3 |
| Sogdiana | 1–0 | 2–2 | 2–0 | 2–1 | 2–2 | 1–0 | 2–1 | 1–1 | 0–0 | 1–2 | 1–0 | — | 3–0 | 0–3 |
| Dinamo | 1–0 | 0–1 | 0–3 | 1–2 | 0–1 | 2–1 | 2–1 | 1–1 | 2–2 | 1–4 | 2–2 | 1–0 | — | 2–1 |
| Surkhon | 1–0 | 0–0 | 1–0 | 2–0 | 2–1 | 1–1 | 1–1 | 1–3 | 0–0 | 0–0 | 2–0 | 1–0 | 1–0 | — |

First match(es) will be played: unknown. Source:
Legend: Blue = home team win; Yellow = draw; Red = away team win.

=== Results by match played ===
| Team ╲ Round | 1 | 2 | 3 | 4 | 5 | 6 | 7 | 8 | 9 | 10 | 11 | 12 | 13 | 14 | 15 | 16 | 17 | 18 | 19 | 20 | 21 | 22 | 23 | 24 | 25 | 26 |
|---|---|---|---|---|---|---|---|---|---|---|---|---|---|---|---|---|---|---|---|---|---|---|---|---|---|---|
| AGMK | D | L | W | L | L | L | W | L | L | L | D | W | D | L | D | W | L | L | W | L | W | W | D | W | W | L |
| Andijon | D | D | L | L | W | D | D | L | L | D | D | L | L | W | D | W | L | L | D | W | W | L | D | L | D | W |
| Bukhoro | D | L | D | W | L | D | L | L | D | L | L | L | W | L | D | L | D | W | L | W | D | L | L | D | D | W |
| Bunyodkor | L | L | W | W | W | D | L | W | D | W | D | L | W | W | W | L | W | D | L | W | D | L | D | W | W | D |
| Kokand | D | D | L | L | W | L | D | L | L | L | D | D | L | L | L | W | W | W | W | D | L | L | W | L | D | D |
| Lokomotiv | L | W | W | W | W | W | D | D | D | W | W | L | W | L | W | D | W | D | D | D | D | W | D | W | W | D |
| Metallurg | D | W | L | W | L | W | L | D | D | L | D | L | D | W | W | L | L | W | D | L | W | L | D | W | D | W |
| Nasaf | D | W | L | L | L | W | W | D | W | L | D | W | W | W | L | W | L | L | D | L | L | W | D | L | D | L |
| Navbahor | D | L | L | W | W | D | W | D | D | D | D | W | W | L | D | L | W | L | L | D | W | D | D | L | L | D |
| Pakhtakor | W | W | W | D | W | W | W | D | W | W | W | W | W | W | W | W | W | W | W | W | W | W | W | W | L | D |
| Qizilqum | D | W | D | L | L | L | W | D | L | D | D | L | L | W | L | L | W | L | D | L | D | W | D | D | L | L |
| Sogdiana | W | L | L | L | W | L | L | W | W | W | D | D | L | W | W | W | D | W | D | D | L | W | W | L | D | D |
| Dinamo | D | L | W | W | L | D | D | W | D | D | D | W | L | L | L | L | L | L | L | L | L | L | L | L | W | W |
| Surkhon | D | W | W | D | L | D | L | W | W | W | L | W | L | L | L | D | L | W | W | W | L | D | L | W | L | L |

Updated to match(es) played on 1 December 2019. Source:
W = Win; D = Draw; L = Loss

== Goals ==
Pakhtakor's Dragan Ćeran won the Super League Golden Boot after scoring 23 goals, a record for a 24-game Super League season

.

=== Goalscorers ===
As of 1 December 2019

| # | Player | Club | Goals |
|---|---|---|---|
| 1 | (Serbia) Dragan Ceran | Pakhtakor | 23 |
| 2 | (Uzbekistan) Igor Sergeev | Pakhtakor | 17 |
| 3 | (Uzbekistan) Zafar Polvonov | AGMK | 15 |
| 4 | (Uzbekistan) Khumoyun Murtozoyev | Nasaf | 14 |
| 5 | (Uzbekistan) Khursid Giyosov | Bunyodkor | 12 |
| 6 | (Uzbekistan) Temurkhuja Abdukholiqov | Lokomotiv | 11 |
| 6 | (Georgia (country)) Elgujja Grigalashvili | Qizilqum/AGMK | 11 |
| 8 | (Ukraine) Oleksandr Kasyan | Navbahor | 10 |
| 9 | (Uzbekistan) Shakhzod Ubaydullaev | Andijon | 9 |
| 9 | (Uzbekistan) Shokhruz Norkhonov | Sogdiana | 9 |
| 11 | (Uzbekistan) Marat Bikmoev | Pakhtakor | 8 |
| 11 | (Uzbekistan) Murod Kholmukhamedov | Kokand 1912 | 8 |
| 13 | (Uzbekistan) Abdul Aziz Yusupov | Surkhon | 7 |
| 13 | (Uzbekistan) Dostonbek Khamdamov | Pakhtakor | 7 |
| 13 | (Uzbekistan) Mirjakhon Mirakhmadov | Bunyodkor | 7 |
| 16 | (Uzbekistan) Shakhboz Erkinov | Kokand 1912 | 6 |
| 16 | (Uzbekistan) Nurillo Tukhtasinov | Bunyodkor | 6 |
| 16 | (Uzbekistan) Jamshid Iskanderov | Lokomotiv | 6 |
| 16 | (Uzbekistan) Sukhrob Berdiyev | Kokand 1912 | 6 |
| 20 | (Uzbekistan) Stanislav Andreev | Metallurg | 5 |
| 20 | (Uzbekistan) Zokhid Abdullaev | Metallurg | 5 |
| 20 | (Uzbekistan) Muzaffar Muzaffarov | Metallurg | 5 |
| 20 | (Uzbekistan) Bahodir Pardaev | Metallurg | 5 |
| 20 | (Georgia (country)) Kakhi Makharadze | Sogdiana | 5 |
| 20 | (Uzbekistan) Qadamboy Nurmedov | Dinamo | 5 |
| 26 | (Uzbekistan) Jaloliddin Masharipov | Pakhtakor | 4 |
| 26 | (Turkmenistan) Arslanmyrat Amanow | Lokomotiv | 4 |
| 26 | (Uzbekistan) Islom Tukhtakhujaev | Lokomotiv | 4 |
| 26 | (Nicaragua) Ariagner Smith | Qizilqum/Lokomotiv | 4 |
| 26 | (Uzbekistan) Shavkat Salomov | Surkhon | 4 |

=== Hat-tricks ===
| Player | For | Against | Result | Date |
|---|---|---|---|---|
| (Uzbekistan) Zafar Polvonov ^{5} | FC AGMK | Kokand 1912 | 7–1 (H) | 7 April 2019 |
| (Serbia) Dragan Ceran | Pakhtakor | Buxoro | 5–0 (A) | 14 June 2019 |
| (Uzbekistan) Igor Sergeev | Pakhtakor | Qizilqum | 8–0 (H) | 21 June 2019 |
| (Serbia) Dragan Ceran | Pakhtakor | Andijon | 5–1 (H) | 27 August 2019 |
| (Uzbekistan) Zafar Polvonov | FC AGMK | Qizilqum | 4–1 | 27 November 2019 |

== Attendances ==
=== By round ===
2019 Uzbekistan Super League Attendance
| Round | Total | GP. | Avg. Per Game |
|---|---|---|---|
| Round 1 | 60,689 | 7 | 8,670 |
| Round 2 | 61,996 | 7 | 8,856 |
| Round 3 | 49,055 | 7 | 7,008 |
| Round 4 | 49,463 | 7 | 7,066 |
| Round 5 | 51,251 | 7 | 7,321 |
| Round 6 | 52,535 | 7 | 7,505 |
| Round 7 | 69,595 | 7 | 9,942 |
| Round 8 | 51,758 | 7 | 7,394 |
| Round 9 | 39,834 | 7 | 5,690 |
| Round 10 | 54,284 | 7 | 7,754 |
| Round 11 | 32,970 | 7 | 4,710 |
| Round 12 | 41,799 | 7 | 5,971 |
| Round 13 | – | – | – |
| Total | 615,169 | 84 | 7,323 |

=== By team ===
| Pos | Team | Total | High | Low | Average | Change |
|---|---|---|---|---|---|---|
| 1 | Navbahor | 125,954 | | | 9,688 | n/a |
| 2 | Nasaf | 108,184 | | | 8,321 | n/a |
| 3 | Pakhtakor | 97,775 | | | 7,521 | n/a |
| 4 | Bukhoro | 93,034 | | | 7,156 | n/a |
| 5 | Andijon | 91,165 | | | 7,012 | n/a |
| 6 | Dinamo | 89,484 | | | 6,883 | n/a |
| 7 | Surkhon | 77,602 | | | 5,969 | n/a |
| 8 | Sogdiana | 58,999 | | | 4,538 | n/a |
| 9 | Qizilqum | 57,338 | | | 4,410 | n/a |
| 10 | Metallurg | 56,334 | | | 4,333 | n/a |
| 11 | Kokand | 51,474 | | | 3,959 | n/a |
| 12 | Bunyodkor | 42,489 | | | 3,268 | n/a |
| 13 | Lokomotiv | 29,326 | | | 2,255 | n/a |
| 14 | AGMK | 29,301 | | | 2,253 | n/a |
| | League total | 1,008,399 | | | 5,540 | n/a |

Updated to games played on 2019

== Awards ==
=== Monthly awards ===
| Month | Manager of the Month | | Player of the Month | | Goalkeeper of the Month | | Goal of the Month | |
| Month | Manager | Club | Player | Club | Player | Club | Player | Club |
|---|---|---|---|---|---|---|---|---|
| March | (Georgia (country)) Shota Arveladze | Pakhtakor | (Serbia) Dragan Ceran | Pakhtakor | (Uzbekistan) Botirali Ergashev | Dinamo | (Serbia) Dragan Ceran | Pakhtakor |
| April | (Uzbekistan) Vadim Abramov | Bunyodkor | (Uzbekistan) Temurkhuja Abdukholiqov | Lokomotiv | (Uzbekistan) Sanjar Kuvvatov | Pakhtakor | (Uzbekistan) Doston Ibragimov | Buxoro |
| May | (Uzbekistan) Ulugbek Bakaev | Sogdiana | (Serbia) Dragan Ceran | Pakhtakor | (Uzbekistan) Abduvohid Nematov | Nasaf | (Serbia) Slavko Lukic | Navbahor |
| June | (Georgia (country)) Shota Arveladze | Pakhtakor | (Serbia) Dragan Ceran | Pakhtakor | (Uzbekistan) Umedjan Ergashev | Navbahor | (Serbia) Dragan Ceran | Pakhtakor |
| July | (Uzbekistan) Ulugbek Bakaev | Sogdiana | (Uzbekistan) Jaloliddin Masharipov | Pakhtakor | (Uzbekistan) Eldorbek Suyunov | Pakhtakor | (Uzbekistan) Oybek Kilichev | Andijon |
| August | (Georgia (country)) Shota Arveladze | Pakhtakor | (Serbia) Dragan Ceran | Pakhtakor | (Serbia) Milan Mitrovic | Sogdiana | (Uzbekistan) Muzaffar Muzaffarov | Metallurg |
| September | (Georgia (country)) Shota Arveladze | Pakhtakor | (Uzbekistan) Dostonbek Khamdamov | Pakhtakor | (Uzbekistan) Utkir Yusupov | Navbahor | (Uzbekistan) Shakhzod Ubaydullaev | Andijon |
| October | (Georgia (country)) Shota Arveladze | Pakhtakor | (Uzbekistan) Igor Segeev | Pakhtakor | (Uzbekistan) Abduvohid Nematov | Nasaf | (Uzbekistan) Jamshid Iskanderov | Lokomotiv |
| November | (Uzbekistan) Vadim Abramov | Bunyodkor | (Uzbekistan) Nurullo Tukhtasinov | Bunyodkor | (Uzbekistan) Ignatiy Nesterov | Lokomotiv | (Serbia) Darko Stanojević | Surkhon |

=== Annual awards ===
The awards of 2019 Uzbekistan Super League were announced on 24 December 2019.

| Award | Winner | Club |
|---|---|---|
| Player of the Season | (Serbia) Dragan Ceran | Pakhtakor Tashkent |
| Golden Boot | (Serbia) Dragan Ceran | Pakhtakor Tashkent |
| Goalkeeper of the Season | (Uzbekistan) Abduvohid Nematov | FC Nasaf |
| Young Player of the Season | (Uzbekistan) Jasur Jaloliddinov | Bunyodkor |
| Manager of the Season | (Georgia (country)) Shota Arveladze | Pakhtakor Tashkent |
| Goal the Season | (Uzbekistan) Muzaffar Muzaffarov | Metallurg Bekabad |
| Best Referee | Valentin Kovalenko | |
| Fair Play | FC Nasaf | |

Team of the Year
| Goalkeeper | (Uzbekistan) Abduvohid Nematov (FC Nasaf) | | | |
| Defender | (Uzbekistan) Farrukh Sayfiev (Pakhtakor) | (Russia) Igor Golban (Navbahor) | (Uzbekistan) Sardor Kulmatov (Sogdiana) | (Uzbekistan) Khojiakbar Alijonov (Pakhtakor) |
| Midfielder | (Uzbekistan) Jaloliddin Masharipov (Pakhtakor) | (Uzbekistan) Sanjar Kodirkulov (FC Bunyodkor) | (Uzbekistan) Jamshid Iskanderov (Lokomotiv) | (Uzbekistan) Khursid Giyosov (FC Bunyodkor) |
| Forward | (Serbia) Dragan Ceran (Pakhtakor) | | (Uzbekistan) Khumoyun Murtozoyev (FC Nasaf) | |
