= Jasurbek Yakhshiboev =

Uzbekistani footballer

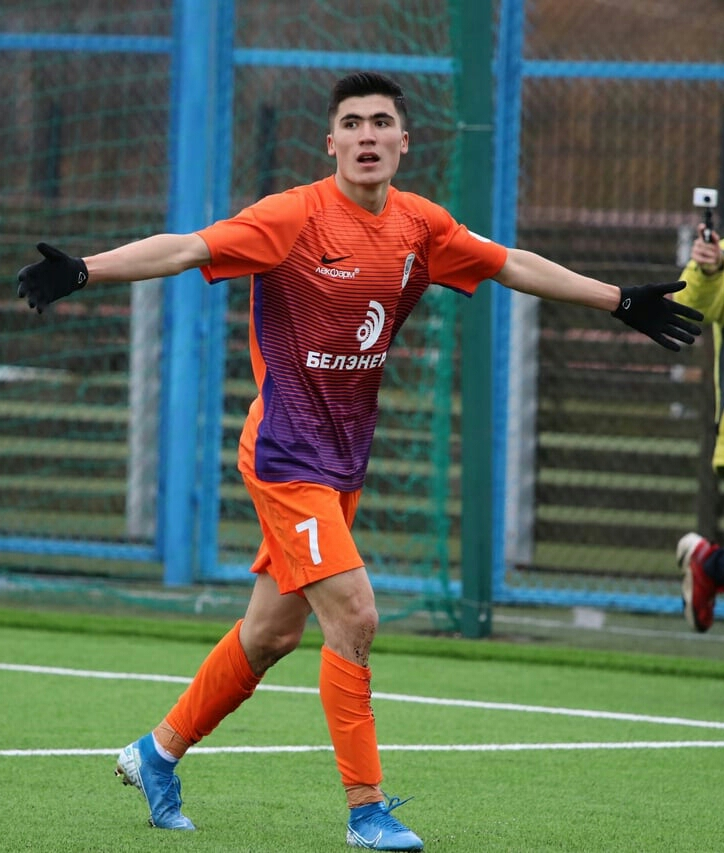
- Yakhshiboev with Energetik-BGU in 2020

Personal information
- Full name: Jasurbek Jumaboy oʻgʻli Yaxshiboyev
- Date of birth: 24 June 1997 (age 29)
- Place of birth: Chinaz, Tashkent Region, Uzbekistan
- Height: 1.78 m (5 ft 10 in)
- Position: Right winger

Team information
- Current team: Lokomotiv Tashkent
- Number: 99

Youth career
- 2004–2016: Pakhtakor Tashkent

Senior career*
Years	Team	Apps	(Gls)
2016–2020	Pakhtakor Tashkent	46	(3)
2019	→ AGMK (loan)	9	(0)
2020	→ Energetik-BGU (loan)	14	(9)
2020	→ Shakhtyor Soligorsk (loan)	13	(7)
2021–2022	Legia Warsaw	1	(0)
2021–2022	Legia Warsaw II	3	(0)
2021–2022	→ Sheriff Tiraspol (loan)	6	(1)
2022–2023	Navbahor Namangan	24	(6)
2024–2025	Ordabasy	17	(9)
2025	Nassaji Mazandaran	3	(0)
2026–	Lokomotiv Tashkent	2	(0)

International career^{‡}
2016	Uzbekistan U19	3	(1)
2017–2020	Uzbekistan U23	26	(10)
2018–	Uzbekistan	10	(2)
Medal record
Representing Uzbekistan
CAFA Nations Cup
Runner-up	2023 Kyrgyzstan–Uzbekistan	Team
Men's football
AFC U-23 Championship
Gold medal – first place	2018 China	Team
- * Club domestic league appearances and goals as of 29 July 2026 ‡ National team caps and goals as of 21 November 2023

Jasurbek Yakhshiboev (Uzbek: Jasurbek Jumaboy oʻgʻli Yaxshiboyev; born 24 June 1997) is an Uzbekistani professional footballer who plays as a right winger for Lokomotiv Tashkent and the Uzbekistan national team.

== Club career ==
Yakhshiboev was born on 24 June 1997 in the Chinaz town in Tashkent Region, Uzbekistan. He joined the Pakhtakor Tashkent youth system at the age of 7.

Yakhshiboev started his professional career in 2016 and quickly progressed to become a regular player in the Pakhtakor Tashkent first team. In July 2019, he went on loan to AGMK for the second half of 2019 Uzbekistan Super League season. On 2020, Yakhshiboev joined Belarusian club Energetik-BGU on a season-long loan deal. On 19 March 2020 in a match against BATE Borisov, Yakhshiboev scored 2 goals for the club, which was on his debut. On 13 February 2021, he signed a two-and-a-half-year deal with Ekstraklasa club Legia Warsaw. He made his debut in the match against Wisła Kraków in Ekstraklasa.

On 30 August 2021 he joined Moldovan club Sheriff Tiraspol on loan. On 28 September 2021, he scored the first goal in an upset 2–1 victory over Real Madrid in the UEFA Champions League.

On 5 July 2022, Yakhshiboev terminated his contract with Legia by mutual consent. On 16 July 2022, he signed a contract with Uzbekistan Super League club Navbahor Namangan.

== International career ==
In 2016, he played 3 matches and scored 1 goal for the Uzbekistan national under-20 football team. Since 2016, he has been playing for the Uzbekistan national under-23 football team. In January 2018, he was part of the team that won AFC U-23 Championship.

Yakhshiboev debuted for the Uzbekistan national team on 18 May 2018 in a friendly match against Iran at the China Cup tournament.

== Career statistics ==
=== Club ===
As of match played 23 June 2024.

Appearances and goals by club, season and competition
Club	Season	League			National cup (Note: Includes Uzbekistan Cup, Moldovan Cup, Kazakhstan Cup)		Continental		Other		Total	
Club	Season	Division	Apps	Goals	Apps	Goals	Apps	Goals	Apps	Goals	Apps	Goals
Pakhtakor Tashkent	2016	Uzbekistan Super League	2	0	0	0	—		—		2	0
Pakhtakor Tashkent	2017	Uzbekistan Super League	11	0	1	0	0	0	—		12	0
Pakhtakor Tashkent	2018	Uzbekistan Super League	27	3	4	2	1 (Note: Appearance(s) in AFC Champions League)	0	—		32	5
Pakhtakor Tashkent	2019	Uzbekistan Super League	6	0	0	0	3	0	—		9	0
Pakhtakor Tashkent	Total		46	3	5	2	4	0	—		55	5
AGMK (loan)	2019	Uzbekistan Super League	9	0	1	0	—		—		10	0
Energetik-BGU (loan)	2020	Belarusian Premier League	14	9	0	0	—		—		14	9
Shakhtyor Soligorsk (loan)	2020	Belarusian Premier League	13	7	1	2	1 (Note: Appearance in UEFA Europa League)	0	—		15	9
Legia Warsaw	2020–21	Ekstraklasa	1	0	0	0	0	0	—		1	0
Legia Warsaw II	2020–21	III liga, gr. I	1	0	—		—		—		1	0
Legia Warsaw II	2021–22	III liga, gr. I	2	0	—		—		—		2	0
Legia Warsaw II	Total		3	0	—		—		—		3	0
Sheriff Tiraspol (loan)	2021–22	Moldovan National Division	6	1	1	0	5 (Note: Three appearances and one goal in UEFA Champions League, two appearances in UEFA Europa League)	1	—		12	2
Navbahor Namangan	2022	Uzbekistan Super League	7	2	3	0	—		—		10	2
Navbahor Namangan	2023	Uzbekistan Super League	17	4	2	0	3	1	—		22	5
Navbahor Namangan	Total		24	6	5	0	3	1	—		32	7
Ordabasy	2024	Kazakhstan Premier League	9	4	2	0	—		1 (Note: Appearance in Kazakhstan Super Cup)	0	12	4
Career total			125	30	15	4	13	2	1	0	154	36

=== International ===
As of match played 16 October 2023

Appearances and goals by national team and year
National team	Year	Apps	Goals
Uzbekistan	2018	1	0
Uzbekistan	2020	2	0
Uzbekistan	2023	7	2
Total		10	2

Scores and results list Uzbekistan's goal tally first, score column indicates score after each Yakhshiboev goal.

List of international goals scored by Jasurbek Yakhshiboev
No.	Date	Venue	Opponent	Score	Result	Competition
1	28 March 2023	King Abdullah Sports City, Jeddah, Saudi Arabia	Venezuela	1–1	1–1	Friendly
2	17 June 2023	Milliy Stadium, Tashkent, Uzbekistan	Tajikistan	1–1	5–1	2023 CAFA Nations Cup group stage

== Honours ==
Shakhtyor Soligorsk

- Belarusian Premier League: 2020

Legia Warsaw

- Ekstraklasa: 2020–21

Sheriff Tiraspol

- Moldovan Super Liga: 2021–22

Uzbekistan U23

- AFC U-23 Championship: 2018
