= 2024 FC Ordabasy season =

FC Ordabasy
2024 season
- Chairman: Kaysar Abdraymov
- Manager: Aleksandr Sednyov (until 18 August); Kirill Keker (Acting) (from 26 August)
- Stadium: Kazhymukan Munaitpasov Stadium
- Premier League: 4th
- Kazakhstan Cup: Quarterfinal vs Aktobe
- League Cup: Group stage
- UEFA Champions League: First qualifying round vs Petrocub Hîncești
- UEFA Conference League: Third qualifying round vs Pyunik
- Top goalscorer: League: Jasurbek Yakhshiboev (10); All: Jasurbek Yakhshiboev (10)
- Highest home attendance: 17,083 vs Aktobe (8 May 2024)
- Lowest home attendance: 2,000 vs Turan (28 September 2024)
- Average home league attendance: 7,881 (10 November 2024)
- Biggest win: 5–0 vs Shakhter Karagandy (H)
- Biggest defeat: 2–4 vs Astana (H)
Home colours	Away colours

The 2024 FC Ordabasy season is the 22nd successive season that Ordabasy will play in the Kazakhstan Premier League, the highest tier of association football in Kazakhstan.

== Season events ==
On 12 January, Ordabasy announced the signing of Reginaldo from Água Santa.

On 16 January, Ordabasy announced the signing of Samat Zharynbetov from Tobol.

On 4 February, Ordabasy announced the signing of Karlo Sentić on loan from Hajduk Split.

On 7 February, Ordabasy announced the signing of Jasurbek Yakhshiboev from Navbahor Namangan.

On 9 February, Ordabasy announced the signing of Ihor Plastun from Ludogorets Razgrad.

On 12 February, Ordabasy announced the signing of Zlatan Šehović on loan from Partizan.

On 13 February, Ordabasy announced the signing of Lovro Cvek from CFR Cluj.

On 22 March, Ordabasy announced the signing of Dembo Darboe on loan from Al-Nasr.

On 4 July, Ordabasy announced the signing of Cristian Tovar from Sheriff Tiraspol.

On 5 July, Ordabasy announced the signing of Sergey Ignatovich from Shakhtyor Soligorsk.

== Squad ==
As of match played 10 November 2024

No.	Name	Nationality	Position	Date of birth (Age)	Signed from	Signed in	Contract ends	Apps.	Goals
Goalkeepers
1	Bekkhan Shayzada	(Kazakhstan)	GK	28 February 1998 (aged 26)	Youth Team	2016		106	0
35	Azamat Zhomartov	(Kazakhstan)	GK	19 July 1995 (aged 29)	Arys	2024		4	0
71	Sergey Ignatovich	(Belarus)	GK	29 June 1992 (aged 32)	Shakhtyor Soligorsk	2024	2024	13	0
Defenders
2	Reginaldo	(Brazil)	DF	22 March 1993 (aged 31)	Juventude	2024		23	2
3	Cristian Tovar	(Colombia)	DF	21 June 1999 (aged 25)	Sheriff Tiraspol	2024		9	0
5	Gafurzhan Suyumbayev	(Kazakhstan)	DF	19 August 1990 (aged 34)	Aksu	2023			
6	Aybol Abiken	(Kazakhstan)	DF	1 June 1996 (aged 28)	Unattached	2024		25	0
13	Sagadat Tursynbay	(Kazakhstan)	DF	26 March 1999 (aged 25)	Youth Team	2018		72	5
17	Zlatan Šehović	(Serbia)	DF	3 August 2000 (aged 24)	on loan from Partizan	2024	2024	31	1
22	Sultanbek Astanov	(Kazakhstan)	DF	23 March 1999 (aged 25)	Kairat	2023		58	4
23	Temirlan Yerlanov	(Kazakhstan)	DF	9 July 1993 (aged 31)	Aktobe	2023		157	16
25	Serhiy Malyi	(Kazakhstan)	DF	5 June 1990 (aged 34)	Tobol	2023		119	10
32	Ihor Plastun	(Ukraine)	DF	20 August 1990 (aged 34)	Ludogorets Razgrad	2024		34	3
Midfielders
4	Lovro Cvek	(Croatia)	MF	6 July 1995 (aged 29)	CFR Cluj	2024		24	0
8	Askhat Tagybergen	(Kazakhstan)	MF	9 August 1990 (aged 34)	Tobol	2023		65	15
9	Bauyrzhan Islamkhan	(Kazakhstan)	MF	23 February 1993 (aged 31)	Unattached	2023		41	3
11	Maksim Fedin	(Kazakhstan)	MF	8 June 1996 (aged 28)	Turan	2022		62	6
14	Samat Zharynbetov	(Kazakhstan)	MF	4 January 1994 (aged 30)	Tobol	2024		10	1
18	Murojon Khalmatov	(Kazakhstan)	MF	20 July 2003 (aged 21)	Kairat Academy	2021		25	3
19	Yevheniy Makarenko	(Ukraine)	MF	21 May 1991 (aged 33)	Fehérvár	2023		44	4
21	Yerkebulan Tungyshbayev	(Kazakhstan)	MF	14 January 1995 (aged 29)	Aksu	2023		232	32
77	Zikrillo Sultaniyazov	(Kazakhstan)	MF	15 October 2003 (aged 21)	Academy	2021		10	0
Forwards
7	Shokhboz Umarov	(Uzbekistan)	FW	9 March 1999 (aged 25)	BATE Borisov	2023		76	7
10	Jasurbek Yakhshiboev	(Uzbekistan)	FW	24 June 1997 (aged 27)	Navbahor Namangan	2024		27	10
30	Vsevolod Sadovsky	(Belarus)	FW	4 October 1996 (aged 28)	Rukh Brest	2022		85	17
41	Artem Byesyedin	(Ukraine)	FW	31 March 1996 (aged 28)	Dynamo Kyiv	2023		33	6
Players away on loan
Players that left during the season
6	Batyrkhan Tazhibay	(Kazakhstan)	FW	7 August 2001 (aged 23)	Academy	2021		33	1
12	Karlo Sentić	(Croatia)	GK	3 June 2001 (aged 23)	on loan from Hajduk Split	2024	2024	0	0
47	Vladislav Vasilyev	(Kazakhstan)	MF	10 April 1997 (aged 27)	Tobol	2023		20	1
98	Dembo Darboe	(The Gambia)	FW	17 August 1998 (aged 26)	on loan from Al-Nasr	2024	2024	17	4

== Transfers ==
=== In ===
Date	Position	Nationality	Name	From	Fee	Ref.
12 January 2024	DF	(Brazil)	Reginaldo	Água Santa	Undisclosed	
16 January 2024	MF	(Kazakhstan)	Samat Zharynbetov	Tobol	Undisclosed	
7 February 2024	MF	(Uzbekistan)	Jasurbek Yakhshiboev	Navbahor Namangan	Undisclosed	
9 February 2024	DF	(Ukraine)	Ihor Plastun	Ludogorets Razgrad	Undisclosed	
13 February 2024	MF	(Croatia)	Lovro Cvek	CFR Cluj	Undisclosed	
4 July 2024	DF	(Colombia)	Cristian Tovar	Sheriff Tiraspol	Undisclosed	
5 July 2024	GK	(Belarus)	Sergey Ignatovich	Shakhtyor Soligorsk	Undisclosed	

=== Loans in ===
Date from	Position	Nationality	Name	From	Date to	Ref.
4 February 2024	GK	(Croatia)	Karlo Sentić	Hajduk Split	6 June 2024	
12 February 2024	DF	(Serbia)	Zlatan Šehović	Partizan	End of season	
13 March 2024	FW	(The Gambia)	Dembo Darboe	Al-Nasr	End of season	

=== Out ===
Date	Position	Nationality	Name	To	Fee	Ref.
20 March 2024	MF	(Kazakhstan)	Vladislav Vasilyev	Dinamo Minsk	Undisclosed	

=== Released ===
Date	Position	Nationality	Name	Joined	Date	Ref.
6 February 2024	MF	(Kazakhstan)	Akmal Bakhtiyarov	Chelyabinsk		
7 February 2024	DF	(Senegal)	Mamadou Mbodj	Hapoel Hadera		
15 February 2024	GK	(Kazakhstan)	Mukhammedzhan Seysen	Astana	17 February 2024	
16 November 2024	GK	(Belarus)	Sergey Ignatovich	Zhenis		
16 November 2024	DF	(Brazil)	Reginaldo	Juventude		
16 November 2024	DF	(Kazakhstan)	Aybol Abiken	Kaisar		
16 November 2024	DF	(Ukraine)	Ihor Plastun	Eupen		
16 November 2024	MF	(Croatia)	Lovro Cvek	Šibenik		
16 November 2024	FW	(Ukraine)	Artem Byesyedin	Líšeň		
17 November 2024	MF	(Kazakhstan)	Maksim Fedin	Irtysh Pavlodar		
17 November 2024	FW	(Belarus)	Vsevolod Sadovsky	Kotwica Kołobrzeg		
31 December 2024	DF	(Kazakhstan)	Alikhan Uteshev			
31 December 2024	DF	(Kazakhstan)	Temirlan Yerlanov	Tobol		
31 December 2024	MF	(Kazakhstan)	Samat Zharynbetov	Kyzylzhar		
31 December 2024	MF	(Ukraine)	Yevhen Makarenko			
31 December 2024	FW	(Uzbekistan)	Jasurbek Yakhshiboev	Nassaji Mazandaran		

== Competitions ==
=== Overview ===
Competition	First match	Last match	Starting round	Final position	Record							
Competition	First match	Last match	Starting round	Final position	Pld	W	D	L	GF	GA	GD	Win %
Premier League	2 March 2024	10 November 2024	Matchday 1	4th	24	12	6	6	36	24	+12	50.00
Kazakhstan Cup	14 April 2024	8 May 2024	Round of 16	Quarterfinal	2	1	0	1	3	2	+1	50.00
League Cup	25 May 2024	20 July 2024	Group stage	Group stage	3	0	3	0	4	4	+0	0.00
Super Cup	25 February 2024	25 February 2024	Final	Runnersup	1	0	1	0	1	1	+0	0.00
UEFA Champions League	10 July 2024	17 July 2024	First qualifying round	First qualifying round	2	0	1	1	0	1	−1	0.00
UEFA Conference League	23 July 2024	15 August 2024	Second qualifying round	Third qualifying round	4	1	0	3	4	6	−2	25.00
Total					36	14	11	11	48	38	+10	38.89

Last updated: 10 November 2024
Source: Competitions

=== Super Cup ===
25 February 2024	Ordabasy	1–1 (4 – 5 p)	Tobol	Aksu
18:00 (UTC+6)	Malyi (yellow card) 15'; Makarenko 45'; Makarenko (yellow card) 88'; Sadovsky (yellow card) 89'	Report	Gabarayev (yellow card) 57'; Miladinović 63'	Stadium: Mardan Sports Complex; Attendance: 6,000; Referee: Bulat Sariev
	Penalties
	Makarenko (penalty scored); Fedin (penalty scored); Reginaldo (penalty missed); Sadovsky (penalty scored); Tursynbay (penalty scored); Tungyshbayev (penalty missed)		(penalty scored) El Messaoudi; (penalty missed) Ivanović; (penalty scored) Asrankulov; (penalty scored) Ndiaye; (penalty scored) Chesnokov; (penalty scored) Cooper

=== Premier League ===
==== Results summary ====
Overall								Home						Away					
Pld	W	D	L	GF	GA	GD	Pts	W	D	L	GF	GA	GD	W	D	L	GF	GA	GD
24	12	6	6	36	24	+12	42	7	2	3	22	13	+9	5	4	3	14	11	+3

Last updated: 10 November 2024.
Source: See Results

==== Results by round ====
Round	1	2	3	4	5	6	7^{1}	8	9	10	11	12	13	15	16^{1}	17	18	19	20	21	14	22	23	24	25	26
Ground	H	A	H	A	H	A	A	H	A	H	A	A	H	A	H	A	H	A	H	H	H	A	A	H	A	H
Result	W	D	L	W	D	D	P	W	D	W	W	W	W	D	P	W	D	L	W	L	W	W	L	L	L	W
Position	1	3	5	3	3	4	7	5	5	2	2	1	1	1	3	3	3	4	4	4	2	1	1	3	5	4

Source: See Results
A = Away; H = Home; W = Win; D = Draw; L = Loss; P = Bye
Notes:
- ^{1} Ordabasy had a bye during the sixth and sixteenth round of fixtures.

==== Results ====
2 March 2024 1	Ordabasy	5–0	Shakhter Karagandy	Shymkent
16:30 (UTC+5)	Plastun 5'; Umarov 13'; Yakhshiboev 37'; Malyi (yellow card) 55' (goal) 67'; Šehović 60'	Report	Flyuk (yellow card) 34'; Tyulyubay (yellow card) 39'; Ashortia (yellow card) 75'	Stadium: Kazhymukan Munaitpasov Stadium; Attendance: 8,500; Referee: Ruslan Sultangaliev

6 March 2024 2	Atyrau	1–1	Ordabasy	Atyrau
18:00 (UTC+5)	Adil (yellow card) 39'; Zhumakhanov (yellow card) 50'; Adambaev (yellow card) 53'; Zhagorov (yellow card) 90+3'; Kaldybekov 90+5' (yellow card) 90+5'	Report	Kerimzhanov 66' (o.g.)	Stadium: Munaishy Stadium; Attendance: 5,000; Referee: Aydin Tasybaev

31 March 2024 3	Ordabasy	1–2	Kairat	Shymkent
19:00 (UTC+5)	Yerlanov (yellow card) 58'; Cvek (yellow card) 66'; Yakhshiboev 85'	Report	Plastun 42' (o.g.); João Paulo (yellow card) 56' (goal) 68'; Shvyryov (yellow card) 63'	Stadium: Kazhymukan Munaitpasov Stadium; Attendance: 8,700; Referee: Daniyar Sakhi

7 April 2024 4	Turan	0–1	Ordabasy	Turkistan
19:00 (UTC+5)	Dmitrijev (yellow card) 54'	Report	Yakhshiboev 25'; Šehović (yellow card) 50'; Tagybergen (yellow card) 79'; Yerlanov (yellow card) 88'	Stadium: Turkistan Arena; Attendance: 4,700; Referee: Arman Ismuratov

20 April 2024 5	Ordabasy	1–1	Kyzylzhar	Shymkent
16:30 (UTC+5)	Yakhshiboev (yellow card) 37'; Malyi 52'; Yerlanov (yellow card) 57'	Report	Beryozkin 45+3'; Ospanov (yellow card) 53'; Nižić (yellow card) 66'; Saulet (yellow card) 90'	Stadium: Kazhymukan Munaitpasov Stadium; Attendance: 9,000; Referee: Rustam Omarov

28 April 2024 6	Elimai	1–1	Ordabasy	Semey
14:00 (UTC+5)	Thioub 3'; Keiler (yellow card) 22'; Schmidt (yellow card) 90'	Report	Darboe 13'; Makarenko (yellow card) 90'	Stadium: Spartak Stadium; Attendance: 8,000; Referee: Saken Baimbet

7	Aksu	Bye	Ordabasy	Pavlodar
(UTC+5)				Stadium: Central Stadium

12 May 2024 8	Ordabasy	1–0	Tobol	Shymkent
21:00 (UTC+5)	Islamkhan (yellow card) 8'; Byesyedin 19' (yellow card) 50'; Plastun (yellow card) 52'; Tagybergen (yellow card) 74'	Report	Essien (yellow card) 8'; Ndiaye (yellow card) 9'; Miladinović (yellow card) 64' (red card) 90+3'; Asrankulov (yellow card) 90+4'	Stadium: Kazhymukan Munaitpasov Stadium; Attendance: 9,573; Referee: Alexander Zatula

18 May 2024 9	Aktobe	0–0	Ordabasy	Aktobe
19:00 (UTC+5)	Kenesov (yellow card) 80'	Report	Islamkhan (yellow card) 66'	Stadium: Central Stadium; Attendance: 12,600; Referee: Baghdad Abdullayev

1 June 2024 10	Ordabasy	3–1	Zhetysu	Shymkent
21:00 (UTC+5)	Byesyedin 21' (yellow card) 28'; Makarenko 31'; Yakhshiboev 35'	Report	Usenov 26'; Muzhikov (yellow card) 53'; Orynbasar (yellow card) 90+4'	Stadium: Kazhymukan Munaitpasov Stadium; Attendance: 8,500; Referee: Ruslan Sultangaliev

16 June 2024 11	Astana	0–1	Ordabasy	Almaty
20:00 (UTC+5)		Report	Šehović (yellow card) 70'; Tungyshbayev 77' (yellow card) 87'; Abiken (yellow card) 90+2'	Stadium: Khan Taniri Stadium; Attendance: 2,000; Referee: Artem Kuchin

23 June 2024 12	Zhenis	1–3	Ordabasy	Astana
18:00 (UTC+5)	Belančić 16'; Cheredinov (yellow card) 21'; Karagounis (yellow card) 28'; Prokopenko (yellow card) 66'	Report	Zhomartov (yellow card) 15'; Islamkhan (yellow card) 22'; Darboe 46'; Reginaldo 48'; Yakhshiboev 80'	Stadium: Kazhymukan Munaitpasov Stadium; Attendance: 199; Referee: Rustam Omarov

29 June 2024 13	Ordabasy	2–1	Kaisar	Shymkent
20:00 (UTC+5)	Plastun (yellow card) 33'; Makarenko (yellow card) 44'; Yakhshiboev 54'; Malyi (yellow card) 61'; Darboe 84'	Report	Zhaksylykov 7'; Baradzin (yellow card) 48'; Gromyko (yellow card) 54'; Yudenkov (yellow card) 80'	Stadium: Kazhymukan Munaitpasov Stadium; Attendance: 9,300; Referee: Aydin Tasybaev

28 July 2024 15	Zhetysu	1–1	Ordabasy	Taldykorgan
18:00 (UTC+5)	Chaduneli (yellow card) 62'; Braga (yellow card) 67'; Taipi (yellow card) 76'; Zhumabek 83'	Report	Tovar (yellow card) 13'; Tursynbay 31'	Stadium: Zhetysu Stadium; Attendance: 2,500; Referee: Sariev Bulat

16	Ordabasy	Bye	Aksu	Shymkent
(UTC+5)				Stadium: Kazhymukan Munaitpasov Stadium

18 August 2024 17	Shakhter Karagandy	2–3	Ordabasy	Karaganda
18:00 (UTC+5)	Kozlov (yellow card) 1'; Nikolić (yellow card) 13'; Đokić 51'; Lisakovich 77'	Report	Malyi (red card) 15'; Tagybergen (yellow card) 19'; Yakhshiboev 35', 61' (yellow card) 45+2'; Byesyedin 58'	Stadium: Shakhter Stadium; Attendance: 7,000; Referee: Sayat Karabaev

25 August 2024 18	Ordabasy	1–1	Aktobe	Shymkent
20:00 (UTC+5)	Suyumbayev (yellow card) 28'; Astanov (yellow card) 63'; Umarov 72'	Report	Cevallos 14'; Kiki (yellow card) 62'; Strumia (yellow card) 77'; Kasym (yellow card) 82'	Stadium: Kazhymukan Munaitpasov Stadium; Attendance: 12,000; Referee: Bagdat Abdullayev

31 August 2024 19	Kaisar	2–1	Ordabasy	Kyzylorda
20:00 (UTC+5)	Milojko (yellow card) 48'; Narzildayev 65'; Zhaksylykov (yellow card) 66'; Pryndeta 70'; Norbekov (yellow card) 83'; Sicaci (yellow card) 90'; Kenesbek (yellow card) 90+2'	Report	Plastun 16'; Astanov (yellow card) 22'; Yakhshiboev (yellow card) 45+1'; Abiken (yellow card) 69'	Stadium: Gani Muratbayev Stadium; Attendance: 4,000; Referee: Denis Izmailov

15 September 2024 20	Ordabasy	1–0	Atyrau	Shymkent
19:00 (UTC+5)	Tagybergen 22'; Yerlanov (yellow card) 75'; Abiken (yellow card) 83' (yellow-red card) 90+4'	Report	Takulov (yellow card) 61'; Barbosa (red card) 71'; Olimzoda (yellow card) 74'	Stadium: Kazhymukan Munaitpasov Stadium; Attendance: 8,000; Referee: Aydin Tasybaev

22 September 2024 21	Ordabasy	2–4	Astana	Shymkent
19:00 (UTC+5)	Yakhshiboev 26', 45+3'; Umarov (yellow card) 33'; Ignatovich (yellow card) 73'; Suyumbayev (yellow card) 89'; Tungyshbayev (yellow card) 90+4'	Report	Amanović (yellow card) 14'; Vorogovsky 24'; Chinedu 45+2', 59'; Gripshi 74' (pen.) (yellow card) 78'	Stadium: Kazhymukan Munaitpasov Stadium; Attendance: 14,000; Referee: Bulat Sariev

27 September 2024 14	Ordabasy	2–0	Turan	Shymkent
19:00 (UTC+5)	Tungyshbayev 47'; Islamkhan 52'	Report	Arkhipov (yellow card) 77'	Stadium: Kazhymukan Munaitpasov Stadium; Attendance: 2,000; Referee: Grigory Moskovchenko
Note: Match originally scheduled for 13 July, but postponed due to Ordabasy's participation in the 2024–25 UEFA Champions League.

3 October 2024 22	Kyzylzhar	0–1	Ordabasy	Petropavl
14:00 (UTC+5)	Muldinov (yellow card) 26' (yellow-red card) 73'; Sebai (yellow card) 44'	Report	Šehović (yellow card) 40'; Byesyedin 81'; Umarov (yellow card) 84'	Stadium: Karasai Stadium; Attendance: 1,000; Referee: Rustam Omarov

19 October 2024 23	Tobol	1–0	Ordabasy	Kostanay
18:00 (UTC+5)	Tapalov 32'; Asrankulov (yellow card) 66'; Costa (yellow card) 85'	Report	Yerlanov (yellow card) 51'; Yakhshiboev (red card) 86'; Tungyshbayev (yellow card) 90'	Stadium: Central Stadium; Attendance: 2,800; Referee: Georgy Chekhovsky

26 October 2024 24	Ordabasy	1–2	Zhenis	Shymkent
18:00 (UTC+5)	Sadovsky 66'	Report	Budínský 7'; Adílio 29'	Stadium: Kazhymukan Munaitpasov Stadium; Attendance: 2,000; Referee: Rustam Omarov

2 November 2024 25	Kairat	2–1	Ordabasy	Almaty
16:00 (UTC+5)	Santana 42'; Baybek 84'	Report	Astanov (yellow card) 53'; Suyumbayev (yellow card) 60'; Tungyshbayev 75'; Byesyedin (yellow card) 80'	Stadium: Central Stadium; Attendance: 12,675; Referee: Daniyar Sakhi

10 November 2024 26	Ordabasy	2–1	Elimai	Shymkent
14:00 (UTC+5)	Yerlanov (yellow card) 25' (goal) 58'; Plastun 34'; Astanov (yellow card) 54'	Report	David (yellow card) 36'; Sviridov 78'; Korzun (yellow card) 80'	Stadium: Kazhymukan Munaitpasov Stadium; Attendance: 3,000; Referee: Grigory Moskovchenko

==== League table ====
Pos	Team	Pld	W	D	L	GF	GA	GD	Pts	Qualification or relegation
2	Astana	24	14	4	6	39	19	+20	46	Qualification for the Conference League second qualifying round
3	Aktobe (W)	24	12	7	5	39	26	+13	43	Qualification for the Europa League first qualifying round (Note: Aktobe qualified for the Europa League first qualifying round by winning the 2024 Kazakhstan Cup.)
4	Ordabasy	24	12	6	6	36	24	+12	42	Qualification for the Conference League first qualifying round
5	Tobol	24	11	6	7	33	23	+10	39	
6	Elimai	24	10	7	7	35	32	+3	37	

Source: UEFA, Soccerway, QFL
Rules for classification: 1) Points; 2) Goal difference; 3) Matches won; 4) Goals scored; 5) Away goals scored; 6) Head-to-head points; 7) Head-to-head matches won; 8) Head-to-head goal difference; 9) Head-to-head goals scored; 10) Head-to-head away goals scored; 11) Draw.
(W) Cup winners

=== Kazakhstan Cup ===
14 April 2024 Last 16	Taraz	0–2	Ordabasy	Taraz
14:00 (UTC+6)	Asan (yellow card) 30'; Zhaksymbetov (yellow card) 62'; Ashirbek (yellow card) 89'	Report	Reginaldo (yellow card) 28' (goal) 36'; Tungyshbayev 37'; Malyi (yellow card) 47'; Makarenko (yellow card) 53'	Stadium: Central Stadium; Attendance: 6,200; Referee: Sanjar Iskakov

8 May 2024 Quarterfinal	Ordabasy	1–2 (a.e.t.)	Aktobe	Shymkent
20:00 (UTC+6)	Malyi (yellow card) 10'; Yakhshiboev (yellow card) 80'; Makarenko 91'; Abiken (red card) 103'; Tagybergen (yellow card) 120+1'; Byesyedin (yellow card) 120+1'	Report	Romero 105+2'; Kenesov (yellow card) 108'; Jean 117'; Kairov (yellow card) 118'; Strumia (yellow card) 120+1'	Stadium: Kazhymukan Munaitpasov Stadium; Attendance: 17,083; Referee: Artem Kuchin

=== League Cup ===
==== Group stage ====
Pos	Team	Pld	W	D	L	GF	GA	GD	Pts	Qualification
1	Elimai	3	2	1	0	8	2	+6	7	Advanced to Semifinals
2	Atyrau	3	1	1	1	2	3	−1	4	
3	Ordabasy	3	0	3	0	4	4	0	3	
4	Turan	3	0	1	2	2	7	−5	1	

Updated to match(es) played on 20 July 2024. Source:

25 May 2024 1	Atyrau	0–0	Ordabasy	Atyrau
18:00 (UTC+5)	Dzhumatov (red card) 77'; Signevich (yellow card) 83'	Report	Tungyshbayev (yellow card) 29'; Tagybergen (yellow card) 88'; Makarenko (yellow card) 90+2'	Stadium: Munaishy Stadium; Attendance: 6,500; Referee: Sayat Karabaev

6 July 2024 2	Ordabasy	2–2	Elimai	Shymkent
20:00 (UTC+5)	Tungyshbayev (yellow card) 55'; Plastun (yellow card) 70'; Tursynbay 72', 88'; Malyi (yellow card) 74'	Report	China (yellow card) 41'; Nurgaliyev 54'; Payruz (yellow card) 65' (goal) 79'	Stadium: Kazhymukan Munaitpasov Stadium; Referee: Sayat Karabaev

20 July 2024 3	Turan	2–2	Ordabasy	Turkistan
20:00 (UTC+5)	Jakoliš 25' (yellow card) 90+6'; Mukashev 43'; Dmitrijev (red card) 50'; Khadzhiev (yellow card) 90'; Vasilyuchek (yellow card) 90+5'	Report	Darboe 1'; Zharynbetov 5'; Abiken (yellow card) 56'	Stadium: Turkistan Arena; Attendance: 1,500; Referee: Marat Iskakov

=== UEFA Champions League ===
==== Qualifying rounds ====
10 July 2024 First qualifying round 1st leg	Ordabasy (Kazakhstan)	0–0	(Moldova) Petrocub Hîncești	Shymkent, Kazakhstan
20:00 (UTC+5)	Malyi (yellow card) 67'; Plastun (yellow card) 73'; Yakhshiboev (yellow card) 90+1'	Report	Ambros (yellow card) 45'; Borș (yellow card) 78'; Mudrac (yellow card) 89'	Stadium: Kazhimukan Munaitpasov Stadium; Attendance: 16,500; Referee: Patrik Kolarić (Croatia)

17 July 2024 First qualifying round 2nd leg	Petrocub Hîncești (Moldova)	1–0 (1–0 agg.)	(Kazakhstan) Ordabasy	Chișinău, Moldolva
22:00 (UTC+5)	Lungu (yellow card) 22' (goal) 34'; Borș (yellow card) 42'; Șmalenea (yellow card) 86'	Report	Malyi (yellow card) 52'; Yakhshiboev (yellow card) 59'	Stadium: Zimbru Stadium; Attendance: 6,752; Referee: Miloš Milanović (Serbia)
Note: Petrocub Hîncești play their home match at the Zimbru Stadium in Chișinău, instead of their regular stadium, the Stadionul Municipal, in Hîncești, which did not meet UEFA requirements.

=== UEFA Conference League ===
==== Qualifying rounds ====
23 July 2024 Second qualifying round 1st leg	Differdange 03 (Luxembourg)	1–0	(Kazakhstan) Ordabasy	Differdange, Luxembourg
22:00 (UTC+5)	Rychelmy (yellow card) 34'; Jorginho 37'	Report	Makarenko (yellow card) 14'; Yerlanov (yellow card) 68'; Malyi (yellow card) 70'; Tungyshbayev (yellow card) 82'; Suyumbayev (yellow card) 82'	Stadium: Stade Municipal de la Ville de Differdange; Attendance: 1,526; Referee: Mohammad Usmam Aslam (Norway)

1 August 2024 Second qualifying round 2nd leg	Ordabasy (Kazakhstan)	4–3 (a.e.t.) (4–4 agg.) (4–3 p)	(Luxembourg) Differdange 03	Shymkent, Kazakhstan
20:00 (UTC+5)	Brusco 24' (o.g.); Plastun (yellow card) 41'; Tagybergen 55'; Sadovsky 82'; Tursynbay (yellow card) 90+6' (goal) 117' (pen.); Tovar (yellow card) 118'	Report	Trani 2'; Franzoni (yellow card) 45'; Jorginho 59', 120' (yellow card) 116'; Leandro (yellow card) 98' (yellow-red card) 105+1'; Rychelmy (yellow card) 105+2'; Felipe (yellow card) 105+4'; Bei (yellow card) 119'	Stadium: Kazhimukan Munaitpasov Stadium; Attendance: 6,570; Referee: Marek Radina (Czech Republic)
	Penalties
	Cvek (penalty scored); Abiken (penalty scored); Umarov (penalty missed); Islamkhan (penalty scored); Tursynbay (penalty missed); Sadovsky (penalty scored)		(penalty scored) Jorginho; (penalty missed) Rauch; (penalty scored) Rychelmy; (penalty scored) Simões; (penalty missed) Bei; (penalty missed) El Idrissi

8 August 2024 Third qualifying round 1st leg	Ordabasy (Kazakhstan)	0–1	(Armenia) Pyunik	Almaty, Kazakhstan
20:00 (UTC+5)		Report	Kovalenko (yellow card) 44'; Otubanjo 56' (yellow card) 67'; Davidyan (yellow card) 68'; Grigoryan (yellow card) 90+6'; Bratkov (yellow card) 90+7'	Stadium: Almaty Central Stadium; Attendance: 7,860; Referee: Marek Radina (Czech Republic)
Note: Ordabasy play their home match at the Almaty Central Stadium, in Almaty, instead of their regular stadium, the Kazhimukan Munaitpasov Stadium, in Shymkent.

15 August 2024 Third qualifying round 2nd leg	Pyunik (Armenia)	1–0 (2–0 agg.)	(Kazakhstan) Ordabasy	Yerevan, Armenia
21:00 (UTC+5)	Alemão (yellow card) 14'; Otubanjo 66'	Report	Plastun (yellow card) 56'; Malyi (yellow card) 70'; Šehović (yellow card) 70'; Byesyedin (yellow card) 86'	Stadium: Vazgen Sargsyan Republican Stadium; Attendance: 6,287; Referee: Miguel Nogueira (Portugal)

== Squad statistics ==
As of match played 10 November 2024

=== Appearances and goals ===
No.	Pos	Nat	Player	Total		Premier League		Kazakhstan Cup		League Cup		Super Cup		UEFA Champions League		UEFA Conference League	
No.	Pos	Nat	Player	Apps	Goals	Apps	Goals	Apps	Goals	Apps	Goals	Apps	Goals	Apps	Goals	Apps	Goals
1	GK	(Kazakhstan) KAZ	Bekkhan Shayzada	21	0	13	0	2	0	1+1	0	1	0	0	0	3	0
2	DF	(Brazil) BRA	Reginaldo	22	2	10+3	1	2	1	2+1	0	1	0	0	0	2+1	0
3	DF	(Colombia) COL	Cristian Tovar	9	0	4+1	0	0	0	2	0	0	0	0	0	2	0
4	MF	(Croatia) CRO	Lovro Cvek	24	0	9+7	0	1	0	2	0	1	0	0+1	0	2+1	0
5	DF	(Kazakhstan) KAZ	Gafurzhan Suyumbayev	21	0	11+4	0	2	0	1+1	0	0	0	1	0	1	0
6	MF	(Kazakhstan) KAZ	Aybol Abiken	25	0	8+7	0	0+1	0	3	0	0	0	0+2	0	0+4	0
7	FW	(Uzbekistan) UZB	Shokhboz Umarov	30	2	10+11	2	0+1	0	3	0	1	0	0	0	2+2	0
8	MF	(Kazakhstan) KAZ	Askhat Tagybergen	35	2	22+2	1	2	0	1+1	0	1	0	2	0	4	1
9	MF	(Kazakhstan) KAZ	Bauyrzhan Islamkhan	28	1	16+4	1	1+1	0	0	0	0	0	2	0	2+2	0
10	FW	(Uzbekistan) UZB	Jasurbek Yakhshiboev	27	10	15+2	10	2	0	0+2	0	1	0	2	0	1+2	0
11	MF	(Kazakhstan) KAZ	Maksim Fedin	16	0	0+11	0	1	0	2+1	0	1	0	0	0	0	0
13	DF	(Kazakhstan) KAZ	Sagadat Tursynbay	13	4	2+3	1	1	0	3	2	0+1	0	1+1	0	0+1	1
14	MF	(Kazakhstan) KAZ	Samat Zharynbetov	10	1	1+6	0	0+1	0	2	1	0	0	0	0	0	0
17	DF	(Serbia) SRB	Zlatan Šehović	31	1	13+8	1	0+1	0	2+1	0	1	0	1+1	0	3	0
19	MF	(Ukraine) UKR	Yevhen Makarenko	32	2	18+3	1	1+1	1	0+2	0	1	0	2	0	4	0
21	MF	(Kazakhstan) KAZ	Yerkebulan Tungyshbayev	26	4	3+14	3	1+1	1	2	0	0+1	0	0+2	0	0+2	0
22	DF	(Kazakhstan) KAZ	Sultanbek Astanov	22	0	15+1	0	0+1	0	1	0	0	0	2	0	1+1	0
23	DF	(Kazakhstan) KAZ	Temirlan Yerlanov	26	1	19	1	1	0	1	0	1	0	1	0	3	0
25	DF	(Kazakhstan) KAZ	Serhiy Malyi	28	2	18+1	2	2	0	0+1	0	1	0	2	0	3	0
30	FW	(Belarus) BLR	Vsevolod Sadovsky	28	2	8+13	1	1	0	0+1	0	0+1	0	0+1	0	2+1	1
32	DF	(Ukraine) UKR	Ihor Plastun	34	3	23	3	2	0	2	0	1	0	2	0	4	0
35	GK	(Kazakhstan) KAZ	Azamat Zhomartov	4	0	3	0	0	0	1	0	0	0	0	0	0	0
41	FW	(Ukraine) UKR	Artem Byesyedin	23	4	10+6	4	0+1	0	0+1	0	0	0	2	0	2+1	0
71	GK	(Belarus) BLR	Sergey Ignatovich	13	0	8	0	0	0	1	0	0	0	2	0	2	0
Players away from Ordabasy on loan:
Players who left Ordabasy during the season:
47	MF	(Kazakhstan) KAZ	Vladislav Vasilyev	1	0	0	0	0	0	0	0	0+1	0	0	0	0	0
98	FW	(The Gambia) GAM	Dembo Darboe	17	4	5+3	3	0+1	0	1+1	1	0	0	0+2	0	1+3	0

=== Goal scorers ===
Place	Position	Nation	Number	Name	Premier League	Kazakhstan Cup	League Cup	Super Cup	UEFA Champions League	UEFA Conference League	Total
1	FW	(Uzbekistan)	10	Jasurbek Yakhshiboev	10	0	0	0	0	0	10
2	FW	(Ukraine)	41	Artem Byesyedin	4	0	0	0	0	0	4
2	MF	(Kazakhstan)	21	Yerkebulan Tungyshbayev	3	1	0	0	0	0	4
2	FW	(The Gambia)	98	Dembo Darboe	3	0	1	0	0	0	4
2	DF	(Kazakhstan)	13	Sagadat Tursynbay	1	0	2	0	0	1	4
6	DF	(Ukraine)	32	Ihor Plastun	3	0	0	0	0	0	3
6	MF	(Ukraine)	19	Yevhen Makarenko	1	1	0	1	0	0	3
8	DF	(Kazakhstan)	25	Serhiy Malyi	2	0	0	0	0	0	2
8	FW	(Uzbekistan)	7	Shokhboz Umarov	2	0	0	0	0	0	2
8	DF	(Brazil)	2	Reginaldo	1	1	0	0	0	0	2
8	MF	(Kazakhstan)	8	Askhat Tagybergen	1	0	0	0	0	1	2
8	FW	(Belarus)	30	Vsevolod Sadovsky	1	0	0	0	0	1	2
8				Own goal	1	0	0	0	0	1	2
14	DF	(Serbia)	17	Zlatan Šehović	1	0	0	0	0	0	1
14	MF	(Kazakhstan)	9	Bauyrzhan Islamkhan	1	0	0	0	0	0	1
14	DF	(Kazakhstan)	23	Temirlan Yerlanov	1	0	0	0	0	0	1
14	MF	(Kazakhstan)	14	Samat Zharynbetov	0	0	1	0	0	0	1
				TOTALS	36	3	4	1	0	4	48

=== Clean sheets ===
Place	Position	Nation	Number	Name	Premier League	Kazakhstan Cup	League Cup	Super Cup	UEFA Champions League	UEFA Conference League	Total
1	GK	(Belarus)	71	Sergey Ignatovich	4	0	0	0	1	0	5
2	GK	(Kazakhstan)	1	Bekkhan Shayzada	3	1	0	0	0	0	4
3	GK	(Kazakhstan)	35	Azamat Zhomartov	1	0	1	0	0	0	2
				TOTALS	7	1	1	0	1	0	10

=== Disciplinary record ===
Number	Nation	Position	Name	Premier League		Kazakhstan Cup		League Cup		Super Cup		UEFA Champions League		UEFA Conference League		Total	
Number	Nation	Position	Name	Booked	Sent off (straight red)	Booked	Sent off (straight red)	Booked	Sent off (straight red)	Booked	Sent off (straight red)	Booked	Sent off (straight red)	Booked	Sent off (straight red)	Booked	Sent off (straight red)
2	(Brazil)	DF	Reginaldo	0	0	1	0	0	0	0	0	0	0	0	0	1	0
3	(Colombia)	DF	Cristian Tovar	1	0	0	0	0	0	0	0	0	0	1	0	2	0
4	(Croatia)	MF	Lovro Cvek	1	0	0	0	0	0	0	0	0	0	0	0	1	0
5	(Kazakhstan)	DF	Gafurzhan Suyumbayev	3	0	0	0	0	0	0	0	0	0	1	0	4	0
6	(Kazakhstan)	MF	Aybol Abiken	4	1	0	1	1	0	0	0	0	0	0	0	5	2
7	(Uzbekistan)	FW	Shokhboz Umarov	2	0	0	0	0	0	0	0	0	0	0	0	2	0
8	(Kazakhstan)	MF	Askhat Tagybergen	3	0	1	0	1	0	0	0	0	0	0	0	5	0
9	(Kazakhstan)	MF	Bauyrzhan Islamkhan	3	0	0	0	0	0	0	0	0	0	0	0	3	0
10	(Uzbekistan)	FW	Jasurbek Yakhshiboev	3	1	1	0	0	0	0	0	2	0	0	0	6	1
13	(Kazakhstan)	DF	Sagadat Tursynbay	0	0	0	0	0	0	0	0	0	0	1	0	1	0
17	(Serbia)	DF	Zlatan Šehović	3	0	0	0	0	0	0	0	0	0	1	0	4	0
19	(Ukraine)	MF	Yevhen Makarenko	2	0	1	0	1	0	1	0	0	0	1	0	6	0
21	(Kazakhstan)	MF	Yerkebulan Tungyshbayev	3	0	0	0	2	0	0	0	0	0	1	0	6	0
22	(Kazakhstan)	DF	Sultanbek Astanov	4	0	0	0	0	0	0	0	0	0	0	0	4	0
23	(Kazakhstan)	DF	Temirlan Yerlanov	6	0	0	0	0	0	0	0	0	0	1	0	7	0
25	(Kazakhstan)	DF	Serhiy Malyi	2	1	2	0	1	0	1	0	2	0	2	0	10	1
30	(Belarus)	FW	Vsevolod Sadovsky	0	0	0	0	0	0	1	0	0	0	0	0	1	0
32	(Ukraine)	DF	Ihor Plastun	2	0	0	0	1	0	0	0	1	0	2	0	6	0
35	(Kazakhstan)	GK	Azamat Zhomartov	1	0	0	0	0	0	0	0	0	0	0	0	1	0
41	(Ukraine)	FW	Artem Byesyedin	3	0	1	0	0	0	0	0	0	0	1	0	5	0
71	(Belarus)	GK	Sergey Ignatovich	1	0	0	0	0	0	0	0	0	0	0	0	1	0
Players away on loan:
Players who left Ordabasy during the season:
			TOTALS	46	3	7	1	7	0	3	0	5	0	12	0	80	4
