= Lucas Cunha =

Lucas Cunha may refer to:

- Lucas Cunha (footballer, born January 1997), Brazilian football centre-back for Gil Vicente
- Lucas Cunha (footballer, born July 1997), Brazilian football midfielder for Comercial-SP

== See also ==
- Lucas Da Cunha (born 2001), French football attacking midfielder
