= Darko Stanojević (footballer, born 1987) =

Serbian footballer

Personal information
- Date of birth: 12 April 1987 (age 39)
- Place of birth: Loznica, SFR Yugoslavia
- Height: 1.86 m (6 ft 1 in)
- Position: Centre-back

Team information
- Current team: OFK Napredak Markovac

Youth career
- Loznica

Senior career*
Years	Team	Apps	(Gls)
2004–2007	Loznica	60	(3)
2005	→ Mačva Šabac (loan)	4	(0)
2007–2011	Vujić Voda	20	(2)
2007–2008	→ Čukarički (loan)	2	(0)
2008–2009	→ Metalac Gornji Milanovac (loan)	10	(0)
2009–2010	→ Srem (loan)	31	(1)
2011	Mash'al	11	(0)
2012–2014	Olmaliq	70	(4)
2015	Shurtan	25	(2)
2016	Olmaliq	10	(1)
2016	Radnik Bijeljina	2	(0)
2016	Novi Pazar	17	(0)
2017–2018	Navbahor Namangan	52	(3)
2019–2021	Surkhon Termez	48	(3)
2021–2023	Neftchi Fergana	13	(0)
2023	Mladost Lučani	3	(0)
2024	FAP Priboj		
2025	OFK Napredak Markovac		
- * Club domestic league appearances and goals as of 10 May 2023

Darko Stanojević (Serbian Cyrillic: Дарко Станојевић; born 12 April 1987) is a Serbian professional footballer who plays as a defender.
