= Reginaldo (footballer, born 1993) =

Brazilian footballer

Personal information
- Full name: Reginaldo Lopes de Jesus
- Date of birth: 22 February 1993 (age 33)
- Place of birth: Salvador, Brazil
- Height: 1.74 m (5 ft 9 in)
- Position: Right back

Team information
- Current team: Náutico
- Number: 93

Senior career*
Years	Team	Apps	(Gls)
2012–2013	Novoperário	14	(0)
2012	→ Sete de Setembro (loan)	4	(0)
2013–2014	Maringá	16	(0)
2014–2016	Coritiba	13	(0)
2015	→ ABC (loan)	41	(2)
2016	Joinville	22	(0)
2017	Oeste	17	(0)
2017–2018	Londrina	36	(2)
2018	→ Linense (loan)	11	(0)
2018–2020	Athletico Paranaense	6	(0)
2019–2020	→ Atlético Goianiense (loan)	44	(1)
2020	→ CRB (loan)	33	(3)
2021–2022	CRB	87	(1)
2023	Água Santa	15	(0)
2023	Juventude	33	(0)
2024	Ordabasy	13	(1)
2025	Juventude	24	(0)
2026–	Náutico	38	(2)
- * Club domestic league appearances and goals as of 18 November 2026

Reginaldo Lopes de Jesus (born 22 February 1993), simply known as Reginaldo, is a Brazilian footballer who plays as a right back for Náutico.

== Career ==
On 12 January 2024, Kazakhstan Premier League club Ordabasy announced the signing of Reginaldo.

== Honours ==
=== Individual ===
- Campeonato Paulista Team of the year: 2023
