= Coca-Cola Bottlers Uzbekistan =

Soft drink partnership in Uzbekistan

Coca-Cola Bottlers Uzbekistan Ltd.
- Native name: Coca-Cola Ichimligi Uzbekiston Ltd.
- Founded: 1993; 33 years ago in Tashkent, Uzbekistan
- Revenue: ▲US$160 million (2019)
- Owner: Uzbekozikovkatholding (57.118%); The Coca-Cola Company (42.882%)

Coca-Cola Bottlers Uzbekistan (Uzbek: Coca-Cola Ichimligi Uzbekiston Ltd.) is a joint venture between the Uzbek state and the Coca-Cola Company established in 1993. The company is headquartered in Tashkent and has four production facilities: two in Tashkent, one in Namangan, and one in Urgench. In 2019, the company controlled nearly half of Uzbekistan's market for soft drinks and generated revenue of UZS 1.4 trillion. The Uzbek state currently owns 57.1 percent of the joint venture, with the Coca-Cola Company owning the remainder.

== History ==
Coca-Cola Bottlers Uzbekistan began production in March 1994 with an initial production target of 2.2 million gallons a year. The shareholders were Roz Trading Ltd., an entity controlled by Afghan-American businessman Mansur Maqsudi, the Coca-Cola Company (via The Coca-Cola Export Corporation), and Uzpishprom, an Uzbek state enterprise. In May 1996, the company opened its second bottling plant in the Kirbay district on the outskirts of Tashkent. In February 1997 a second plant was opened in Namangan in order to serve the populous Fergana Valley. In June 1997, the company's fourth plant opened in Urgench in the far west of Uzbekistan.

In 2001, the Uzbek government launched an investigation into Roz Trading over alleged financial impropriety. Soon after, Roz Trading's shares in Coca-Cola Bottlers Uzbekistan were taken over by the Uzbek state. In June 2006, Maqsudi filed a claim against the Coca-Cola Company for allegedly conspiring with Uzbek government to strip Roz Trading of its majority share in the bottling company.

== Privatization Plan ==
In March 2019, Uzbek President Shavkat Mirziyoyev signed a decree aimed at improving the attractiveness of Uzbekistan for foreign investors. This decree mandated the privatization of 64 of the country's largest state-owned enterprises, including Coca-Cola Bottlers Uzbekistan. In March 2020, the Coca-Cola Company announced it would invest $31 million in its Uzbek joint venture to upgrade the bottling plants. In December 2020, the Uzbek government announced that it had retained Rothschild & Co to manage the sale of a portion of the state's shares in the joint venture.
