= Radosav Aleksić =

Serbian footballer

Personal information
- Date of birth: 6 March 1986 (age 40)
- Place of birth: SFR Yugoslavia
- Height: 1.90 m (6 ft 3 in)
- Position: Defender

Team information
- Current team: FK Jedinstvo 1936

Senior career*
Years	Team	Apps	(Gls)
2009-2010	Napredak Kruševac	12	(0)
2010-2011	Radnički Kragujevac	11	(0)
2011-2014	Slavija Sarajevo	52	(5)
2014	Zrinjski Mostar	10	(0)
2015-2016	Travnik	40	(2)
2016-2018	Krupa	57	(2)
2018-2019	Radnik Bijeljina	15	(0)
2019	Andijon	12	(0)
2020-2023	Trayal Kruševac	63	(2)
- * Club domestic league appearances and goals

Radosav Aleksić (Serbian: Радосав Алексић; born 6 March 1986) is a Serbian footballer who plays for FK Trayal Kruševac in his home country.

== Career ==
Aleksić started his senior career with FK Napredak Kruševac in the Serbian SuperLiga, where he made over twelve league appearances and scored zero goals. After that, he played for FK Radnički 1923, FK Slavija Sarajevo, HŠK Zrinjski Mostar, NK Travnik, FK Krupa, FK Radnik Bijeljina, FK Andijon, and FK Trayal Kruševac, where he now plays.
