= Uzbekistan GTL =

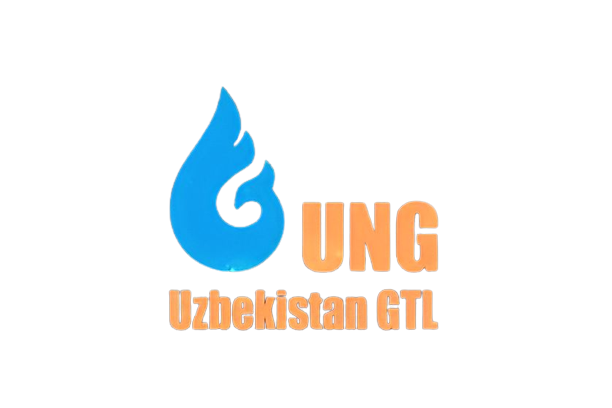
Current logo of Uzbekistan GTL

Uzbekistan GTL (Oltin Yo'l GTL) is a gas-to-liquids (GTL) plant in the Qashqadaryo Region, Uzbekistan.

== History ==
Construction of a GTL plant in Uzbekistan was discussed between Uzbekneftegaz and Abu Dhabi's International Petroleum Investment Company in March 2008. However, in April 2009 Uzbekneftegaz signed a heads of agreement for the GTL project with Sasol and Petronas. On 15 July 2009, Sasol, Petronas, and Uzbekneftegaz signed an agreement to establish a joint venture for developing the GTL project. The detailed feasibility study was conducted by Technip. Technip also conducted the front end engineering design.

Work commenced after the 2016 Uzbekistan election.

== Technical features ==
The plant will use the Sasol's slurry phase distillate process. The annual capacity of the plant would be 1.3 million tonnes of petroleum products such as diesel, kerosene, naphtha and liquefied petroleum gas. The project is expected to cost US$5.6 billion. It is scheduled to be commissioned in 2021.

== Ownership ==
The project is jointly developed by Sasol, Petronas, and Uzbekneftegaz. Each partner will have an equal share in the joint venture.
