= Lucas Cunha (footballer, born July 1997) =

Brazilian footballer

Personal information
- Full name: Lucas de Oliveira Cunha
- Date of birth: 30 July 1997 (age 29)
- Place of birth: Cataguases, Minas Gerais, Brazil
- Height: 1.78 m (5 ft 10 in)
- Position: Midfielder

Team information
- Current team: Trepça
- Number: 11

Youth career
- 2012–2014: Friburguense

Senior career*
Years	Team	Apps	(Gls)
2015–2016	Friburguense	7	(1)
2017	Mogi Mirim	2	(0)
2018	Matonense	6	(0)
2019	Primavera	8	(1)
2019	Surkhon Termez	7	(0)
2020	Balkany Zorya	13	(2)
2021	Comercial-SP	1	(0)
2023	Parintins		
2023–2024	Ulpiana	25	(1)
2024–2025	Trepça	16	(4)
- * Club domestic league appearances and goals as of 1 June 2025

Lucas de Oliveira Cunha, generally known as Lucas Cunha or Luquinhas, (born 30 July 1997) is a Brazilian footballer who plays as a midfielder for Trepça.

== Career ==
=== Brazil ===
At the age of 17, Cunha played for Friburguense in the 2015 Campeonato Carioca, appearing in seven matches in the Taça Guanabara. After appearing in Friburguense's 2016 Copa Rio victory, he left the club in early 2017 due to an inability to agree on a new contract.

Cunha made his debut for Mogi Mirim against Botafogo (São Paulo) in the 2017 Campeonato Brasileiro Série C. He played one more match in the Série C before leaving the club.

In late 2018, Cunha joined Primavera for the 2019 Campeonato Paulista Série A3 season, where he played eight matches.

=== Trepça ===
On 17 June 2024, Cunha signed for Trepça of the First Football League of Kosovo in Group A.
