= 2010 Uzbek League =

Uzbek League
- Season: 2010
- Dates: 13 March – 31 October
- Champions: Bunyodkor
- Relegated: Lokomotiv Tashkent; Xorazm FK Urganch
- Top goalscorer: Alisher Kholiqov; Nosirbek Otakuziyev (13 goals)
- Biggest home win: Bunyodkor 5-0 Nasaf Qarshi
- Biggest away win: Lokomotiv Tashkent 0-4 Bunyodkor
- Highest scoring: FC Shurtan Guzar 5-3 Olmaliq FK
- Highest attendance: Navbahor Namangan - Nasaf Qarshi 35,325
- Lowest attendance: Lokomotiv Tashkent - Mash'al Mubarek 153

The 2010 Uzbek League season was the 19th season of top-level football in Uzbekistan since independence in 1992.

Bunyodkor were the defending champions from the 2009 campaign.

== Teams ==
=== League Re-structure ===
Only 14 clubs are in the fray this year without the two relegated sides of Sogdiana and Bukhara.

No club has been promoted to the top-flight this season as the reserves of Bunyodkor and Mashal, who are already in the first division, won the second division titles.

=== Stadia and locations ===
Location of teams in 2010 Uzbek League

Club	Location	Stadium	Stadium Capacity
FK Andijan	Andijan	Soghlom Avlod Stadium	18,360
Bunyodkor	Tashkent	JAR Stadium	8,460
Lokomotiv Tashkent	Tashkent	TTYMI Stadium	6,010
Mash'al Mubarek	Muborak	Bahrom Vafoev Stadium	10,000
Metallurg Bekabad	Bekabad	A.Anoxina Stadium	11,000
Nasaf Qarshi	Qarshi	Qarshi Stadium	16,000
Navbahor Namangan	Namangan	Markaziy Stadium	33,000
FK Neftchi Farg'ona	Fergana	Farghona Stadium	14,520
Olmaliq FK	Olmaliq	Metallurg Stadium (Olmaliq)	10,000
Pakhtakor	Tashkent	Pakhtakor Stadium	35,000
FK Samarqand-Dinamo	Samarkand	Olimpiya Stadium	12,250
FC Shurtan Guzar	G‘uzor	G'uzor Stadium	7,000
Qizilqum Zarafshon	Zarafshan	Progress Stadium	5,000
Xorazm FK Urganch	Urgench	Xorazm Stadium	13,500

==== Personnel and kits ====
Team	Manager	Captain	Kit manufacturer	Shirt sponsor	Average Squad Age
FK Andijan	(Ukraine) Amet Memet	(Uzbekistan) Abdumajid Toirov	Puma	UzDaewoo	27.21
Bunyodkor	(Uzbekistan) Mirjalol Qosimov	(Uzbekistan) Viktor Karpenko	Nike	UzGazOil	24.92
Lokomotiv Tashkent	(Turkmenistan) Tachmurad Agamuradov	(Russia) Aleksandr Filimonov	Puma	O'zbekiston Temir Yollari	25.46
Mash'al Mubarek	(Kazakhstan) Vladimir Fomichyov	(Uzbekistan) Fozil Musaev	Adidas	Uzbekneftegaz	24.60
Metallurg Bekabad	(Uzbekistan) Rustam Mirsodiqov	(Uzbekistan) Odil Isaboyev	Adidas	Uzmetkombinat	28.24
Nasaf Qarshi	(Ukraine) Anatoliy Demyanenko	(Uzbekistan) Hayrulla Karimov	Puma	Sho'rtan Gaz Mahsulot	27.09
Navbahor Namangan	(Uzbekistan) Sergey Kovshov	(Uzbekistan) Rakhmatulla Berdimurodov	Adidas	Unsponsored	24.53
Neftchi Farg'ona	(Uzbekistan) (Armenia) Yuriy Sarkisyan	(Uzbekistan) Aziz Alijonov	Adidas	Uzbekneftegaz	26.17
Olmaliq FK	(Uzbekistan) Igor Shkvyrin	(Uzbekistan) Abdukakhkhor Khojiakbarov	Umbro	Almalyk MMC	25.48
Pakhtakor	(Uzbekistan) Ravshan Khaydarov	(Uzbekistan) Odil Ahmedov	Adidas	Kapital Bank	23.56
FK Samarqand-Dinamo	(Uzbekistan) Viktor Djalilov	(Moldova) Denis Romanenco	Adidas	Unsponsored	26.94
Shurtan Guzar	(Germany) Edgar Gess	(Uzbekistan) Asror Aliqulov	Adidas	Sho'rtan Gaz Mahsulot	26.61
Qizilqum Zarafshon	(Uzbekistan) Sergei Arslanov	(Uzbekistan) Shavkat Nasibullaev	Adidas	Navoi MMC	27.19
Xorazm FK Urganch	(Uzbekistan) Vali Sultonov	(Uzbekistan) Bakhtiyor Ashurmatov	Puma	Unsponsored	27.43

== Managerial changes ==
Team	Outgoing manager	Manner of departure	Replaced by
FK Andijan	(Uzbekistan) Orif Mamatkazin	Contract expired	(Ukraine) (Turkey) Amet Memet
Bunyodkor	(Brazil) Luiz Felipe Scolari	Quit	(Uzbekistan) Mirjalol Qosimov
Lokomotiv Tashkent	(Uzbekistan) Vadim Abramov	Named as the national team's coach	(Uzbekistan) Marat Miftahuddinov
Lokomotiv Tashkent	(Uzbekistan) Marat Miftahuddinov	Sacked	(Uzbekistan) Andrei Miklyaev
Lokomotiv Tashkent	(Uzbekistan) Andrei Miklyaev	Sacked	(Turkmenistan) Täçmyrat Agamyradow
Lokomotiv Tashkent	(Turkmenistan) Täçmyrat Agamyradow	Sacked	(Uzbekistan) Marat Miftahuddinov
Lokomotiv Tashkent	(Uzbekistan) Marat Miftahuddinov	Regained Job Back	(Turkmenistan) Täçmyrat Agamyradow
Mash'al Mubarek	(Uzbekistan) Bahodir Davlatov	Sacked	(Kazakhstan) Vladimir Fomichev
Nasaf Qarshi	(Russia) Viktor Kumikov	Sacked	(Ukraine) Anatoliy Demyanenko
Navbahor Namangan	(Uzbekistan) Mustafo Bayramov	Contract expired	(Uzbekistan) Viktor Djalilov
Navbahor Namangan	(Uzbekistan) Viktor Djalilov	Quit	(Uzbekistan) Sergey Kovshov
Pakhtakor	(Uzbekistan) Viktor Djalilov	Contract expired	(Montenegro) Miodrag Radulović
Pakhtakor	(Montenegro) Miodrag Radulović	Quit	(Uzbekistan) Ravshan Khaydarov
Qizilqum Zarafshon	(Uzbekistan) Rustam Zabirov	Sacked	(Uzbekistan) Sergei Arslanov
FK Samarqand-Dinamo	(Uzbekistan) Azamat Abduraimov	Sacked	(Uzbekistan) Viktor Djalilov
Xorazm FK Urganch	(Uzbekistan) Vali Sultonov	Sacked	(Uzbekistan) Bakhodir Hakimov
Xorazm FK Urganch	(Uzbekistan) Bakhodir Hakimov	Sacked	(Uzbekistan) Vali Sultonov

== Final standings ==
Pos	Team	Pld	W	D	L	GF	GA	GD	Pts	Qualification or relegation
1	Bunyodkor	26	20	5	1	45	10	+35	65	2011 AFC Champions League group stage (Note: Since Bunyodkor also won the 2010 Uzbekistan Cup, the second-placed team of the league also qualified for the 2011 AFC Champions League.)
2	Pakhtakor Tashkent	26	17	6	3	41	19	+22	57	2011 AFC Champions League group stage
3	Nasaf Qarshi	26	13	7	6	30	20	+10	46	2011 AFC Cup group stage
4	Shurtan Guzar	26	12	6	8	35	28	+7	42	2011 AFC Cup group stage
5	Mash'al Mubarek	26	10	7	9	22	24	−2	37	
6	Metallurg Bekabad	26	9	8	9	29	31	−2	35	
7	FK Andijan	26	9	7	10	28	29	−1	34	
8	Qizilqum Zarafshon	26	9	7	10	25	28	−3	34	
9	Navbahor Namangan	26	9	4	13	32	32	0	31	
10	Neftchi Farg'ona	26	8	5	13	36	45	−9	29	
11	Olmaliq FK	26	8	5	13	32	41	−9	29	
12	FK Samarqand-Dinamo	26	6	9	11	28	33	−5	27	
13	Lokomotiv Tashkent	26	6	5	15	20	38	−18	23	Relegation to Lower Division
14	Xorazm FK Urganch	26	2	7	17	21	46	−25	13	Relegation to Lower Division

Updated to match(es) played on 31 October 2010. Source: PFL
Rules for classification: 1) points; 2) goal difference; 3) number of goals scored.

=== Results ===
Home \ Away	AND	BUN	LOK	MAS	MET	NAS	NAV	NEF	OTM	PAK	QIZ	SAM	SHU	XOR
FK Andijan		0–0	2–0	1–1	2–1	1–0	5–1	1–0	3–2	1–1	2–1	1–0	2–1	0–0
Bunyodkor	1–0		1–0	3–0	2–1	5–0	2–0	1–0	1–0	2–1	1–1	2–1	1–1	4–1
Lokomotiv Tashkent	2–0	0–4		1–0	1–0	0–0	1–3	3–1	0–0	0–2	1–0	2–2	0–1	2–1
Mash'al Mubarek	1–0	0–2	1–0		1–1	1–0	2–0	3–0	1–0	1–2	0–2	2–1	1–0	0–0
Metallurg Bekabad	2–1	0–1	1–0	1–0		0–0	0–2	2–2	1–0	1–1	0–0	0–0	2–1	3–1
Nasaf Qarshi	3–1	0–1	2–0	3–1	2–0		1–0	2–0	4–0	1–1	1–0	2–1	0–0	2–1
Navbahor Namangan	2–0	1–2	2–0	0–0	2–0	1–1		1–1	0–1	0–1	1–1	2–0	4–0	4–1
Neftchi Farg'ona	1–1	0–3	2–1	3–0	3–3	1–2	4–3		3–0	3–3	4–2	3–2	0–2	1–0
Olmaliq FK	2–1	1–3	1–1	0–0	3–2	0–0	2–1	0–1		2–3	5–1	3–1	1–0	3–1
Pakhtakor Tashkent	0–0	0–0	4–2	1–0	2–0	2–0	3–1	1–0	2–0		0–0	1–0	2–0	3–0
Qizilqum Zarafshon	2–1	1–0	0–1	1–1	0–1	1–2	1–0	2–1	1–0	0–1		3–1	3–1	1–0
FK Samarqand-Dinamo	2–0	1–2	2–0	1–1	0–0	0–0	1–0	3–1	4–2	2–1	0–0		1–1	1–1
Shurtan Guzar	2–1	0–0	3–2	1–0	2–2	1–0	2–0	2–0	5–3	1–2	0–0	2–0		4–1
Xorazm FK Urganch	1–1	0–1	1–1	1–2	2–3	1–2	0–1	2–1	1–1	0–1	3–1	1–1	0–2	

Updated to match(es) played on 31 October 2010. Source: www.pfl.uz
Legend: Blue = home team win; Yellow = draw; Red = away team win.

== Season statistics ==
=== Top goalscorers ===
Rank	Name	Team	Goals
1	(Uzbekistan) Alisher Kholiqov	Neftchi Farg'ona	13
1	(Uzbekistan) Nosirbek Otakuziyev	Olmaliq FK	13
3	(North Macedonia) Stevica Ristić	Bunyodkor	11
3	(Uzbekistan) Alexander Geynrikh	Pakhtakor	11
3	(Uzbekistan) Jafar Irismetov	FK Samarqand-Dinamo	11
3	(Uzbekistan) Shuhrat Mirkholdirshoev	FK Andijan	11
7	(Uzbekistan) Anvar Berdiev	Neftchi Farg'ona	10
8	(Uzbekistan) Odil Ahmedov	Pakhtakor	9
8	(Uzbekistan) Shakhboz Erkinov	Shurtan Guzar	9
10	(Uzbekistan) Muiddin Mamazulunov	Olmaliq FK	8
10	(Uzbekistan) Zafar Polvonov	Xorazm FK Urganch	8
12	(Uzbekistan) Zokhid Abdullaev	Metallurg Bekabad	7
12	(Belarus) Nikolay Ryndyuk	Mash'al Mubarek	7
12	(Uzbekistan) Shukhrat Yuldashev	Metallurg Bekabad	7
15	(Uzbekistan) Timur Kapadze	Bunyodkor	6
15	(Brazil) Rivaldo	Bunyodkor	6
15	(Uzbekistan) Ilkhom Shomurodov	Nasaf Qarshi	6
15	(Uzbekistan) Olim Navkarov	Lokomotiv Tashkent	6

Last updated: 31 October 2010

=== Disciplinary ===
The Disciplinary List as of October 31, 2010:

Rank	Name	Team	Yellow Cards	Red Cards	Points
1	(Georgia (country)) Kakha Makharadze	Lokomotiv Tashkent	5	3	14
2	(Uzbekistan) Iqbol Akramov	Neftchi Farg'ona	7	2	13
3	(Uzbekistan) Mirzakamol Kamolov	FK Andijan	8	1	11
3	(Uzbekistan) Sunnatilla Mamadaliyev	Navbahor Namangan	8	1	11
3	(Kyrgyzstan) Karim Izrailov	FK Andijan	8	1	11
3	(Nigeria) Patrick Agboh	FC Shurtan Guzar	8	1	11
7	(Uzbekistan) Kamoliddin Tajiev	Pakhtakor	4	2	10
8	(Uzbekistan) Islom Tukhtakhodjaev	Neftchi Farg'ona	6	1	9
8	(Uzbekistan) Sanjar Askaraliev	Neftchi Farg'ona	6	1	9

== Top players ==
Top players according to statistics and performance in the 2010

Goalkeepers

1. (Uzbekistan) Ignatiy Nesterov (Bunyodkor)
2. (Georgia (country)) Mikhail Alavidze (Shurtan Guzar)
3. (Moldova) Denis Romanenco (Dinamo)

Left backs

1. (Nigeria) David Oniya (Dinamo)
2. (Uzbekistan) Ilhom Suyunov (Pakhtakor)
3. (Ukraine) Andriy Erokhin (Qizilqum)

Left-centre backs

1. (Serbia) Bojan Miladinović (Pakhtakor)
2. (Uzbekistan) Yaroslav Krushelnitskiy (Shurtan Guzar)
3. (Ukraine) Aleksandr Polovkov (Navbahor/Andijan)

Right-centre backs

1. (Uzbekistan) Asror Aliqulov (Shurtan Guzar)
2. (Uzbekistan) Maksud Karimov (Nasaf Qarshi)
3. (Uzbekistan) Kamoliddin Tajiev (Pakhtakor)

Right backs

1. (Uzbekistan) Shavkat Mullajanov (Olmaliq FK)
2. (Uzbekistan) Umid Tojimov (Metallurg Bekabad)
3. (Uzbekistan) Mirjalol Qurbonov (Xorazm FK)

Defensive midfielders

1. (Uzbekistan) Viktor Karpenko (Bunyodkor)
2. (Uzbekistan) Jahongir Jiyamuradov (Nasaf Qarshi)
3. (Kyrgyzstan) Karim Izrailov (Mash'al/Andijan)

Left wingers

1. (Uzbekistan) Shuhrat Mirkholdirshoev (FK Andijan)
2. (Uzbekistan) Stanislav Andreev (Pakhtakor)
3. (Ukraine) Yevhen Saiko (Navbahor)

Central midfielders

1. (Uzbekistan) Odil Ahmedov (Pakhtakor)
2. (Uzbekistan) Vadim Afonin (Shurtan)
3. (Ukraine) Andriy Jakovlev (Nasaf Qarshi)

Right wingers

1. (Uzbekistan) Aziz Alijonov (Neftchi Farg'ona)
2. (Georgia (country)) Kakha Makharadze (Lokomotiv Tashkent)
3. (Serbia) Igor Petković (Mash'al)

Left forwards

1. (Uzbekistan) Shakhboz Erkinov (Shurtan Guzar)
2. (Uzbekistan) Aleksandr Geynrikh (Pakhtakor)
3. (Belarus) Nikolay Ryndyuk (Mash'al)

Right forwards

1. (Uzbekistan) Kamoliddin Murzoev (Nasaf Qarshi)
2. (Uzbekistan) Zokhid Abdullaev (Metallurg Bekabad)
3. (Nigeria) Patrick Agboh (Shurtan Guzar)
