= 2011 Uzbek League =

Uzbek League
- Season: 2011
- Dates: 5 March – 5 November
- Champions: Bunyodkor; 4th title
- Relegated: Sogdiana Jizzakh
- AFC Champions League: Bunyodkor; Pakhtakor; Nasaf Qarshi; Neftchi Farg'ona
- Matches: 182
- Goals: 452 (2.48 per match)
- Top goalscorer: Miloš Trifunović (17 goals)

The 2011 Uzbek League season was the 20th season of top-level football in Uzbekistan since independence in 1992.

The draw for the 2011 Uzbek League season took place on December 16, 2010.

Bunyodkor were the defending champions from the 2010 campaign.

== New Rules ==
- The 5+1 format of foreign players has been reduced to 4+1.
- If any team is found winning with the help of the referee (i.e. the team made some deals with the referee before the game), the team will lose 6 to 9 points.
- If there are any riots during a game, then the team concerned will lose 3 points.
- Since there were too many coaches sacked in the last edition of the Uzbek League, now no club can fire their coach, except with the permission of the U.F.F.

== Teams ==
Lokomotiv Tashkent and Xorazm FK Urganch were relegated in the last edition of the Uzbek League.

Locations of the 2011 Uzbek League Teams

Club	Coach	City	Stadium	Capacity	2010
FK Andijan	(Uzbekistan) Orif Mamatkazin	Andijan	Soghlom Avlod Stadium	18,360	7th
Bunyodkor	(Uzbekistan) Mirjalol Qosimov	Tashkent	JAR Stadium	8,460	Champions
FK Buxoro	(Uzbekistan) Gennadiy Kochnev	Bukhoro	Bukhoro Sport Majmuasi	22,700	D1 1st
Mash'al Mubarek	(Kazakhstan) Vladimir Fomichev	Muborak	Bahrom Vafoev Stadium	10,000	5th
Metallurg Bekabad	(Uzbekistan) Rustam Mirsodiqov	Bekabad	Metallurg Bekabad Stadium	11,000	6th
Nasaf Qarshi	(Ukraine) Anatoliy Demyanenko	Qarshi	Qarshi Stadium	16,000	3rd
Navbahor Namangan	(Uzbekistan) Eldor Sakaev	Namangan	Markaziy Stadium	33,000	9th
Neftchi Farg'ona	(Uzbekistan) Yuriy Sarkisyan	Farghona	Farghona Stadium	14,520	10th
Olmaliq FK	(Uzbekistan) Igor Shkvyrin	Olmaliq	Metallurg Stadium	10,000	11th
Pakhtakor	(Uzbekistan) Murod Ismailov	Tashkent	Pakhtakor Stadium	35,000	2nd
Qizilqum Zarafshon	(Uzbekistan) Sergei Arslanov	Zarafshon	Progress Stadium	5,000	8th
FK Dinamo Samarqand	(Uzbekistan) Akhmad Ubaydullaev	Samarqand	Olimpiya Stadium	12,250	12th
Sho'rtan Ghuzor	(Turkmenistan) Tachmurad Agamuradov	Ghuzor	Ghuzor Stadium	7,000	4th
Sogdiana Jizzakh	(Uzbekistan) Murod Otajonov	Jizzakh	Jizzakh Stadium	9,000	D1 2nd

=== Managerial changes ===
Team	Outgoing manager	Manner of departure	Replaced by	Position in table	Date
Navbahor Namangan	None	Sacked	(Uzbekistan) Eldor Sakaev	9th (2010)	January 10, 2010
Qizilqum Zarafshon	(Uzbekistan) Sergei Arslanov	End of tenure as caretaker	(Uzbekistan) Marat Kabaev	8th (2010)	December 23, 2010
Qizilqum Zarafshon	(Uzbekistan) Marat Kabaev	Sacked	(Uzbekistan) Sergei Arslanov	11th (2011)	May 19, 2011
Pakhtakor	(Uzbekistan) Ravshan Khaydarov	Sacked	(Uzbekistan) Murod Ismailov	3rd (2011)	September 27, 2011
FK Samarqand-Dinamo	(Uzbekistan) Viktor Djalilov	Sacked	(Uzbekistan) Akhmad Ubaydullaev	14th (2011)	June 20, 2011
Sogdiana Jizzakh	(Uzbekistan) Rauf Inileev	Resigned	(Uzbekistan) Murod Otajonov	13th (2011)	July 14, 2011
Shurtan Guzar	(Germany) Edgar Gess	Sacked	(Turkmenistan) Tachmurad Agamuradov	12th (2011)	June 30, 2011

== League table ==
Pos	Team	Pld	W	D	L	GF	GA	GD	Pts	Qualification or relegation
1	Bunyodkor	26	19	4	3	51	14	+37	61	2012 AFC Champions League Group stage
2	Nasaf Qarshi	26	15	8	3	43	15	+28	53	2012 AFC Champions League Group stage
3	Pakhtakor Tashkent	26	15	6	5	33	17	+16	51	2012 AFC Champions League Group stage
4	Neftchi Farg'ona	26	13	5	8	36	27	+9	44	2012 AFC Champions League Qualifying play-off (Note: Since Pakhtakor also won the 2011 Uzbekistan Cup, the fourth-placed team of the league also qualified for the 2012 AFC Champions League.)
5	Mash'al Mubarek	26	12	4	10	32	33	−1	40	
6	Navbahor Namangan	26	9	9	8	26	21	+5	36	
7	Shurtan Guzar	26	9	5	12	29	41	−12	32	
8	Metallurg Bekabad	26	9	4	13	35	42	−7	31	
9	FK Buxoro	26	8	7	11	23	38	−15	31	
10	FK Samarqand-Dinamo	26	8	5	13	23	25	−2	29	
11	Olmaliq FK	26	8	5	13	37	45	−8	29	
12	FK Andijan	26	7	7	12	29	43	−14	28	
13	Qizilqum Zarafshon (Note: Qizilqum Zarafshon survived relegation due to FK Guliston not fulfilling all licensing requirements after finishing second in the Lower Division)	26	6	6	14	23	40	−17	24	
14	Sogdiana Jizzakh	26	4	5	17	32	51	−19	17	Relegation to Lower Division

Updated to match(es) played on 9 November 2011. Source: Uzbekistan Professional Football League
Rules for classification: 1) points; 2) goal difference; 3) number of goals scored.

== Results ==
Home \ Away	AND	BUX	BUN	MAS	MET	NAS	NAV	NEF	OTM	PAK	QIZ	SAM	SHU	SOG
FK Andijan		2–2	1–1	4–0	0–1	0–4	0–0	2–3	1–0	2–1	3–0	2–0	3–0	2–1
FK Buxoro	0–0		0–4	2–0	2–1	1–1	1–1	0–1	1–0	0–0	2–1	2–1	2–1	2–1
Bunyodkor	3–1	3–0		2–0	3–1	2–1	1–0	1–0	4–1	2–1	3–1	2–0	2–0	1–0
Mash'al Mubarek	4–0	2–0	0–2		2–1	1–1	2–0	3–2	1–0	1–0	0–0	1–0	2–1	1–1
Metallurg Bekabad	4–1	3–2	2–1	3–1		0–1	0–0	0–0	4–3	0–1	3–1	0–1	1–1	3–2
Nasaf Qarshi	2–0	3–0	0–0	2–0	2–0		3–2	3–0	2–1	1–1	2–1	0–1	5–0	3–1
Navbahor Namangan	1–1	1–0	1–0	2–0	1–0	1–1		0–2	0–1	2–0	3–0	1–1	0–0	2–1
Neftchi Farg'ona	3–0	2–0	0–0	2–1	3–1	1–1	1–1		4–1	4–1	1–0	1–0	0–0	2–1
Olmaliq FK	2–1	6–1	1–3	2–2	4–1	0–0	0–3	2–1		0–1	2–1	1–1	2–0	2–2
Pakhtakor Tashkent	5–1	1–0	0–0	1–0	0–0	0–0	2–1	1–0	1–0		2–0	3–1	3–1	1–0
Qizilqum Zarafshon	2–0	0–0	1–3	0–1	2–1	0–1	0–0	2–1	3–3	0–3		2–1	3–2	0–0
FK Samarqand-Dinamo	3–1	0–1	0–1	2–0	3–1	0–1	0–1	2–0	0–1	0–0	1–1		3–0	2–0
Shurtan Guzar	0–0	1–1	1–0	1–4	2–3	2–1	1–0	4–0	2–0	0–2	1–0	2–0		3–2
Sogdiana Jizzakh	1–1	2–1	1–6	2–3	3–1	0–2	3–2	0–2	5–2	1–2	0–2	0–0	2–3	

Updated to match(es) played on 9 November 2011. Source: www.pfl.uz
Legend: Blue = home team win; Yellow = draw; Red = away team win.

== Top goalscorers ==
As of 9 November 2011

Rank	Name	Team	Goals
1	(Serbia) Miloš Trifunović	Bunyodkor	17
2	(Tajikistan) Muiddin Mamazulunov	Olmaliq FK	16
3	(Uzbekistan) Lochinbek Soliev	FK Andijan	11
3	(Uzbekistan) Anvar Berdiev	Neftchi	11
5	(Uzbekistan) Igor Taran	Shurtan	10
6	(Uzbekistan) Bahodir Pardaev	Sogdiana Jizzakh	9
6	(Uzbekistan) Zafar Kholmurodov	Mash'al Mubarek	9
6	(Uzbekistan) Shakhboz Erkinov	Shurtan	9
9	(Uzbekistan) Anvarjon Soliev	Bunyodkor	8
9	(Uzbekistan) Ilyos Qurbonov	Metallurg Bekabad	8
9	(Uzbekistan) Zokhid Abdullaev	Metallurg Bekabad	8
9	(Uzbekistan) Ivan Nagaev	Metallurg Bekabad (2) / Dinamo (6)	8

== Best XI ==
Championat.uz released the all-star team of the Uzbek League for the season 2011.

Position	Name	Team
Goalkeeper	(Uzbekistan) Ignatiy Nesterov	Bunyodkor
Left Defender	(Uzbekistan) Ilhom Suyunov	Pakhtakor
Right Defender	(Uzbekistan) Jahongir Djiyamurodov	Nasaf Qarshi
Central Defender	(Serbia) Slavoljub Đorđević	Bunyodkor
Central Defender	(Uzbekistan) Islom Tukhtakhodjaev	Neftchi Farg'ona
Defensive Midfield	(Uzbekistan) Lutfulla Turaev	Nasaf Qarshi
Right Wing	(Uzbekistan) Viktor Karpenko	Bunyodkor
Central Midfield	(Uzbekistan) Mansur Saidov	Neftchi Farg'ona
Left Wing	(Turkmenistan) Artur Gevorkyan	Nasaf Qarshi
Forward	(Serbia) Miloš Trifunović	Bunyodkor
Forward	(Tajikistan) Muiddin Mamazulunov	Olmaliq FK
Coach	(Uzbekistan) Mirjalol Qosimov	Bunyodkor
