= 2017 Uzbek League =

Uzbek League
- Season: 2017
- Champions: Lokomotiv
- Relegated: Dinamo; Sogdiana; Neftchi; Shurtan; Obod
- Champions League: Lokomotiv; Nasaf Qarshi
- Top goalscorer: Marat Bikmaev (27)

The 2017 Uzbek League (Футбол бўйича 2017-йилги Ўзбекистон Суперлигаси) was the 26th season of top-level football in Uzbekistan since 1992. Lokomotiv Tashkent were the defending champions from the 2016 campaign.

== Teams ==
Location of teams in 2017 Uzbek League

Navbahor Namangan remained for the 2017 Uzbek League after winning in the relegation play-off match with Naryn. Obod Tashkent was promoted to the 2016 League as the 2015 First League winner. The draw for the 2016 season was held on 20 December 2016. The first matchday is scheduled for 3 March 2017.

| Club | Coach | Location | Stadium | Capacity | Kit sponsor |
|---|---|---|---|---|---|
| Bunyodkor | (Uzbekistan) Mirjalol Qosimov | Tashkent | Bunyodkor Stadium | 34,000 | Jako |
| Bukhoro | (Uzbekistan) Ulugbek Bakaev | Bukhoro | Bukhoro Arena | 22,700 | Macron |
| Dinamo | (Uzbekistan) Oleg Tyulkin | Samarkand | Dinamo Stadium | 16,000 | |
| Kokand 1912 | (Uzbekistan) Numon Khasanov | Kokand | Kokand Stadium | 10,500 | Joma |
| Lokomotiv | (Uzbekistan) Andrey Miklyaev | Tashkent | Lokomotiv Stadium | 8,000 | Joma |
| Mash'al | (Russia) Alexander Khomyakov | Muborak | Bahrom Vafoev Stadium | 10,000 | Patrick |
| Metallurg | (Uzbekistan) Rustam Mirsodiqov | Bekabad | Metallurg Stadium | 15,000 | Joma |
| Nasaf Qarshi | (Uzbekistan) Ruziqul Berdiev | Qarshi | Qarshi Stadium | 14,750 | Adidas |
| Navbahor | (Uzbekistan) Ilkhom Muminjonov | Namangan | Navbahor Stadium | 22,000 | Jako |
| Neftchi | (Uzbekistan) Vadim Abramov | Farghona | Istiqlol Stadium | 20,000 | Joma |
| Obod | (Ukraine) Andriy Demchenko | Tashkent | JAR Stadium | 8,450 | Nike |
| Olmaliq FK | (Russia) Viktor Kumykov | Olmaliq | Olmaliq SM Stadium | 12,000 | Adidas |
| Pakhtakor | (Georgia (country)) Shota Arveladze | Tashkent | Pakhtakor Stadium | 35,000 | Adidas |
| Qizilqum | (Uzbekistan) Yuriy Lukin | Zarafshon | Yoshlar Stadium | 12,500 | Joma |
| Sogdiana | (Uzbekistan) Davron Fayziev | Jizzakh | Sogdiana Stadium | 11,650 | Joma |
| Shurtan | (Uzbekistan) Genadiy Kochnev | Ghuzor | Ghuzor Stadium | 7,000 | Joma |

=== Managerial changes ===
| Team | Outgoing manager | Manner of departure | Date of vacancy | Position in table | Replaced by | Date of appointment |
|---|---|---|---|---|---|---|
| Olmaliq | (Uzbekistan) Igor Shkvyrin | Sacked | 15 December 2016 | Pre-season | (Russia) Viktor Kumykov | 15 December 2016 |
| Obod | (Uzbekistan) Jafar Irismetov | Resigned | 19 December 2016 | Pre-season | (Uzbekistan) Rauf Inileev | 19 December 2016 |
| Bukhoro | (Uzbekistan) Jamshid Saidov | Sacked | 26 January 2017 | Pre-season | (Uzbekistan) Ulugbek Bakaev | 26 January 2017 |
| Shurtan | (Uzbekistan) Ikhtiyor Karimov | End of caretaker spell | 2 February 2017 | Pre-season | (Uzbekistan) Alexander Volkov | 2 February 2017 |
| Dinamo | (Uzbekistan) Ilkhom Sharipov | Resigned | 10 February 2017 | Pre-season | (Germany) Edgar Gess | 10 February 2017 |
| Dinamo | (Uzbekistan) Edgar Gess | Resigned | 10 February 2017 | Pre-season | (Uzbekistan) Oleg Tyulkin | 10 February 2017 |
| Obod | (Uzbekistan) Rauf Inileev | Sacked | 4 March 2017 | Pre-season | (Ukraine) Andriy Demchenko | 4 March 2017 |
| Shurtan | (Uzbekistan) Alexander Volkov | Sacked | 2 April 2017 | 15th | (Uzbekistan) Ikhtiyor Karimov (interim) | 2 April 2017 |
| Pakhtakor | (Uzbekistan) Grigory Kolosovsky | Sacked | 6 April 2017 | 8th | (Uzbekistan) Ravshan Khaydarov | 6 April 2017 |
| Pakhtakor | (Uzbekistan) Ravshan Khaydarov | Sacked | 26 April 2017 | 13th | (Uzbekistan) Jasur Abduraimov | 26 April 2017 |
| Bunyodkor | (Russia) Sergey Lushan | Sacked | 5 May 2017 | | (Uzbekistan) Mirjalol Qosimov | 5 May 2017 |
| Neftchi | (Russia) Andrey Fyodorov | Sacked | 5 June 2017 | 15th | (Uzbekistan) Vadim Abramov | 5 June 2017 |
| Pakhtakor | (Uzbekistan) Jasur Abduraimov | end of caretaker spell | 22 June 2017 | 7th | (Georgia (country)) Shota Arveladze | 22 June 2017 |
| Shurtan | (Uzbekistan) Genadiy Kochnev | End of caretaker spell | 26 July 2017 | 15th | (Germany) Edgar Gess | 26 July 2017 |
| Shurtan | (Germany) Edgar Gess | Resigned | 2 August 2017 | 15th | (Uzbekistan) Genadiy Kochnev (interim) | 2 August 2017 |

== Foreign players ==
The number of foreign players is restricted to five per USL team. A team can use only five foreign players on the field in each game.

| Club | Player 1 | Player 2 | Player 3 | AFC Player | Former players |
|---|---|---|---|---|---|
| AGMK | (Belarus) Uladzislaw Kasmynin | (Serbia) Igor Jelić | (United States) Graham Smith | (Kyrgyzstan) Farhat Musabekov | (Georgia (country)) Shota Grigalashvili |
| Lokomotiv | (Georgia (country)) Kakhi Makharadze | (Burkina Faso) Mohamed Kone | (Nigeria) Olabiran Muyiwa | | (Ivory Coast) Gnohere Krizo |
| Dinamo | (Moldova) Radu Rogac | (Montenegro) Adnan Orahovac | | | |
| Pakhtakor | (Israel) Gidi Kanyuk | (Montenegro) Marko Simić | (Brazil) Tiago Queiroz Bezerra | (Australia) Rostyn Griffiths | (Montenegro) Adnan Orahovac (Croatia) Jurica Buljat |
| Mash'al Mubarek | (Belarus) Igor Tymonyuk | (Ukraine) Vladyslav Pavlenko | | (Japan) Tomoki Muramatsu | (Tajikistan) Umedzhon Sharipov |
| FC Buxoro | (Croatia) Ivor Weitzer | (Kazakhstan) Kirill Pasichnik | (Ukraine) Volodymyr Bayenko | | |
| FC Bunyodkor | (Moldova) Vadim Cemirtan | | | | (Serbia) Dusan Micic |
| Navbahor | (Serbia) Nemanja Jovanovic | (Serbia) Darko Stanojević | | | |
| Neftchi Fergana | | | | | (Belarus) Terentiy Lutsevich (Belarus) Syarhey Kantsavy (Belarus) Dzmitry Kamarowski |
| FC Obod | | | | | |
| Metallurg Bekabad | | | | | |
| Nasaf | (Russia) Igor Golban | (Serbia) Dragan Ceran | | | |
| FC Shurtan Guzar | (Ukraine) Oleksandr Pyschur | | | | |
| Kokand 1912 | (Serbia) Darko Gojkovic | (Serbia) Filip Rajevac | | | |
| Sogdiana Jizzakh | | | | | |
| Qizilqum Zarafshon | (Ukraine) Andriy Derkach | (Moldova) Maxim Iurcu | | (Turkmenistan) Artur Geworkyan | |

== League table ==
| Pos | Team | Pld | W | D | L | GF | GA | GD | Pts | Qualification or relegation |
|---|---|---|---|---|---|---|---|---|---|---|
| 1 | Lokomotiv (C) | 30 | 22 | 4 | 4 | 67 | 20 | +47 | 70 | Qualification to the 2018 AFC Champions League group stage |
| 2 | Nasaf | 30 | 20 | 2 | 8 | 58 | 18 | +40 | 62 | Qualification to the 2018 AFC Champions League qualifying play-off |
| 3 | Pakhtakor | 30 | 18 | 5 | 7 | 44 | 28 | +16 | 59 | Qualification to the 2018 AFC Champions League qualifying play-off |
| 4 | Bunyodkor | 30 | 14 | 10 | 6 | 47 | 29 | +18 | 52 | |
| 5 | Navbahor | 30 | 12 | 10 | 8 | 40 | 37 | +3 | 46 | |
| 6 | Bukhoro | 30 | 13 | 7 | 10 | 42 | 40 | +2 | 46 | |
| 7 | Mashal | 30 | 12 | 8 | 10 | 37 | 31 | +6 | 44 | |
| 8 | Olmaliq | 30 | 12 | 8 | 10 | 31 | 32 | −1 | 44 | |
| 9 | Kokand 1912 | 30 | 11 | 8 | 11 | 42 | 47 | −5 | 41 | |
| 10 | Metallurg | 30 | 12 | 4 | 14 | 40 | 39 | +1 | 40 | |
| 11 | Qizilqum | 30 | 9 | 10 | 11 | 31 | 40 | −9 | 37 | |
| 12 | Dinamo Samarqand (R) | 30 | 8 | 8 | 14 | 21 | 35 | −14 | 32 | Relegation to Lower Division |
| 13 | Sogdiana (R) | 30 | 8 | 7 | 15 | 33 | 51 | −18 | 31 | Relegation to Lower Division |
| 14 | Shurtan (R) | 30 | 8 | 3 | 19 | 28 | 52 | −24 | 27 | Relegation to Lower Division |
| 15 | Neftchi (R) | 30 | 6 | 9 | 15 | 23 | 48 | −25 | 27 | Relegation to Lower Division |
| 16 | Obod (R) | 30 | 2 | 3 | 25 | 15 | 52 | −37 | 9 | Relegation to Lower Division |

Updated to match(es) played on 5 November 2017. Source: Uzbekistan Professional Football League
Rules for classification: 1) points; 2) goal difference; 3) number of goals scored.
(C) Champions; (R) Relegated

=== Table of matches ===
| Date and time | Match | Score | Attendance |
|---|---|---|---|
| 03.03.2017, 15:30 | Metallurg vs Dinamo | 0 : 2 | 1,029 |
| 03.03.2017, 16:00 | Mashal vs Lokomotiv | 0 : 1 | 2,024 |
| 03.03.2017, 17:00 | Pakhtakor vs Qizilqum | 3 : 1 | 4,153 |
| 04.03.2017, 15:30 | Kokand 1912 vs Nasaf | 1 : 2 | 8,135 |
| 04.03.2017, 16:00 | Shurtan vs Neftchi | 1 : 0 | – |
| 04.03.2017, 16:00 | Navbahor vs Obod | 2 : 1 | – |
| 04.03.2017, 16:30 | Buxoro vs Olmaliq | 1 : 0 | – |
| 04.03.2017, 18:00 | Bunyodkor vs Sogdiana | 1 : 0 | – |
| 08.03.2017, 15:00 | Neftchi vs Pakhtakor | 0 : 0 | – |
| 08.03.2017, 16:00 | Lokomotiv vs Sogdiana | 3 : 0 | 1,595 |
| 08.03.2017, 16:00 | Dinamo vs Shurtan | 3 : 0 | 10,138 |
| 09.03.2017, 16:00 | Nasaf vs Buxoro | 2 : 1 | – |
| 09.03.2017, 17:30 | Olmaliq vs Bunyodkor | 0 : 0 | – |
| 10.03.2017, 16:00 | Mashal vs Metallurg | 1 : 0 | 1,885 |
| 10.03.2017, 16:00 | Obod vs Kokand 1912 | 1 : 1 | – |
| 10.03.2017, 17:00 | Qizilqum vs Navbahor | 2 : 1 | – |
| 12.03.2017, 17:00 | Pakhtakor vs Dinamo | 0 : 1 | 2,117 |
| 16.03.2017, 17:00 | Navbahor vs Neftchi | 1 : 1 | 18,992 |
| 18.03.2017, 16:00 | Kokand 1912 vs Qizilqum | 1 : 0 | – |
| 18.03.2017, 16:30 | Shurtan vs Mashal | 0 : 2 | 4,751 |
| 18.03.2017, 16:30 | Buxoro vs Obod | 0 : 1 | – |
| 18.03.2017, 17:00 | Sogdiana vs Olmaliq | 3 : 2 | – |
| 30.06.2017, 19:00 | Lokomotiv vs Metallurg | 3 : 1 | – |
| 04.07.2017, 19:00 | Bunyodkor vs Nasaf | 3 : 2 | – |
| 30.03.2017, 16:00 | Nasaf vs Sogdiana | 4 : 0 | 4,122 |
| 30.03.2017, 17:00 | Obod vs Bunyodkor | 1 : 1 | 721 |
| 31.03.2017, 16:00 | Dinamo vs Navbahor | 0 : 1 | 13,105 |
| 31.03.2017, 16:30 | Mashal vs Pakhtakor | 3 : 0 | 3,447 |
| 31.03.2017, 16:30 | Metallurg vs Shurtan | 4 : 2 | 936 |
| 31.03.2017, 16:30 | Neftchi vs Kokand 1912 | 1 : 2 | 4,213 |
| 31.03.2017, 18:00 | Lokomotiv vs Olmaliq | 5 : 0 | – |
| 31.03.2017, 18:00 | Qizilqum vs Buxoro | 0 : 1 | – |
| 06.04.2017, 17:00 | Shurtan vs Lokomotiv | 2:0 | 5,702 |
| 06.04.2017, 18:00 | Bunyodkor vs Qizilqum | 0:1 | 507 |
| 07.04.2017, 16:30 | Kokand 1912 vs Dinamo | 2:1 | |
| 07.04.2017, 17:00 | Navbahor vs Mashal | 1:0 | |
| 07.04.2017, 17:00 | Pakhtakor vs Metallurg | 1:0 | |
| 07.04.2017, 17:00 | Sogdiana vs Obod | 1:0 | |
| 07.04.2017, 17:30 | Buxoro vs Neftchi | 3:0 | |
| 07.04.2017, 18:00 | Olmaliq vs Nasaf | 1:0 | 2,403 |
| 14.04.2017, 17:00 | Obod vs Olmaliq | 0:1 | 731 |
| 14.04.2017, 17:30 | Mashal vs Kokand 1912 | 1:1 | 2,893 |
| 15.04.2017, 16:00 | Metallurg vs Navbahor | 0:0 | 2,025 |
| 15.04.2017, 17:00 | Shurtan vs Pakhtakor | 3:0 | 7,455 |
| 15.04.2017, 17:00 | Dinamo vs Buxoro | 3:1 | 10,501 |
| 15.04.2017, 18:00 | Lokomotiv vs Nasaf | 2:1 | 1,522 |
| 15.04.2017, 18:00 | Qizilqum vs Sogdiana | 1:1 | 8,781 |
| 16.04.2017, 17:00 | Neftchi vs Bunyodkor | 1:2 | |
| 20.04.2017, 18:00 | Bunyodkor vs Dinamo | 1:1 | |
| 21.04.2017, 18:00 | Pakhtakor vs Lokomotiv | 1:2 | |
| 22.04.2017, 16:33 | Kokand 1912 vs Metallurg | 3:0 | |
| 22.04.2017, 17:00 | Navbahor vs Shurtan | 1:0 | |
| 22.04.2017, 17:00 | Olmaliq vs Qizilqum | 0:0 | |
| 22.04.2017, 17:30 | Nasaf vs Obod | 1:0 | |
| 22.04.2017, 18:00 | Buxoro vs Mashal | 2:2 | 10,572 |
| 22.04.2017, 18:00 | Sogdiana vs Neftchi | 0:1 | |
| 28.04.2017, 17:30 | Mashal vs Bunyodkor | 1:0 | 2,896 |
| 28.04.2017, 18:30 | Pakhtakor vs Navbahor | 1:0 | |
| 29.04.2017, 16:30 | Metallurg vs Buxoro | 1:2 | |
| 29.04.2017, 17:00 | Neftchi vs Olmaliq | 1:1 | |
| 29.04.2017, 17:00 | Dinamo vs Sogdiana | 2:2 | |
| 29.04.2017, 17:30 | Shurtan vs Kokand 1912 | 2:3 | |
| 29.04.2017, 18:00 | Qizilqum vs Nasaf | 1:1 | |
| 29.04.2017, 18:00 | Lokomotiv vs Obod | 7:0 | |
| 03.05.2017, 19:00 | Bunyodkor vs Metallurg | 1 : 1 | |
| 04.05.2017, 18:00 | Navbahor vs Lokomotiv | 2 : 2 | |
| 06.05.2017, 17:00 | Kokand 1912 vs Pakhtakor | 1 : 1 | |
| 06.05.2017, 17:00 | Obod vs Qizilqum | 1 : 1 | |
| 06.05.2017, 18:00 | Sogdiana vs Mashal | 3 : 0 | |
| 06.05.2017, 18:00 | Buxoro vs Shurtan | 2 : 0 | |
| 06.05.2017, 18:00 | Nasaf vs Neftchi | 2 : 0 | |
| 06.05.2017, 18:30 | Olmaliq vs Dinamo | 2 : 0 | |
| 12.05.2017, 17:30 | Metallurg vs Sogdiana | 3 : 1 | |
| 12.05.2017, 17:30 | Neftchi vs Obod | 1 : 0 | |
| 12.05.2017, 18:00 | Shurtan vs Bunyodkor | 1 : 0 | |
| 12.05.2017, 18:00 | Navbahor vs Kokand 1912 | 1 : 1 | |
| 12.05.2017, 19:00 | Pakhtakor vs Buxoro | 2 : 1 | |
| 13.05.2017, 17:30 | Dinamo vs Nasaf | 1 : 1 | |
| 13.05.2017, 18:00 | Mashal vs Olmaliq | 0 : 0 | |
| 13.05.2017, 18:00 | Lokomotiv vs Qizilqum | 2 : 0 | |
| 16.05.2017, 19:00 | Bunyodkor vs Pakhtakor | 1 : 1 | 2 123 |
| 17.05.2017, 17:30 | Kokand 1912 vs Lokomotiv | 1 : 1 | |
| 18.05.2017, 18:00 | Obod vs Dinamo | 3 : 1 | |
| 18.05.2017, 18:30 | Nasaf vs Mashal | 1 : 0 | |
| 18.05.2017, 18:30 | Olmaliq vs Metallurg | 1 : 0 | |
| 18.05.2017, 18:30 | Buxoro vs Navbahor | 3 : 3 | |
| 18.05.2017, 19:00 | Sogdiana vs Shurtan | 1 : 0 | |
| 18.05.2017, 19:00 | Qizilqum vs Neftchi | 2 : 2 | |
| 26.05.2017, 17:45 | Metallurg vs Nasaf | 1 : 0 | |
| 26.05.2017, 18:00 | Kokand 1912 vs Buxoro | 2 : 1 | |
| 26.05.2017, 18:00 | Dinamo vs Qizilqum | 0 : 1 | |
| 26.05.2017, 18:30 | Mashal vs Obod | 3 : 0 | |
| 26.05.2017, 19:00 | Pakhtakor vs Sogdiana | 3 : 2 | |
| 27.05.2017, 18:30 | Shurtan vs Olmaliq | 0 : 1 | |
| 27.05.2017, 19:00 | Navbahor vs Bunyodkor | 1 : 1 | |
| 27.05.2017, 19:00 | Lokomotiv vs Neftchi | 4 : 0 | |
| 14.06.2017, 18:00 | Neftchi vs Dinamo | 2:3 | |
| 14.06.2017, 18:30 | Obod vs Metallurg | 1:4 | |
| 14.06.2017, 19:00 | Qizilqum vs Mashal | 2:0 | |
| 14.06.2017, 19:00 | Sogdiana vs Navbahor | 2:1 | |
| 15.06.2017, 19:00 | Shurtan vs Nasaf | 1:2 | |
| 15.06.2017, 19:00 | Olmaliq vs Pakhtakor | 2:0 | |
| 15.06.2017, 19:00 | Buxoro vs Lokomotiv | 1:2 | |
| 16.06.2017, 19:00 | Bunyodkor vs Kokand 1912 | 2:1 | |
| 14.06.2017, 18:00 | Neftchi vs Dinamo | 2:3 | |
| 14.06.2017, 18:30 | Obod vs Metallurg | 1:4 | |
| 14.06.2017, 19:00 | Qizilqum vs Mashal | 2:0 | |
| 14.06.2017, 19:00 | Sogdiana vs Navbahor | 2:1 | |
| 15.06.2017, 19:00 | Shurtan vs Nasaf | 1:2 | |
| 15.06.2017, 19:00 | Olmaliq vs Pakhtakor | 2:0 | |
| 15.06.2017, 19:00 | Buxoro vs Lokomotiv | 1:2 | |
| 16.06.2017, 19:00 | Bunyodkor vs Kokand 1912 | 2:1 | |
| 19.06.2017, 18:00 | Metallurg vs Qizilqum | 3:1 | |
| 19.06.2017, 19:00 | Pakhtakor vs Nasaf | 2:1 | |
| 19.06.2017, 19:00 | Mashal vs Neftchi | 2:2 | |
| 20.06.2017, 18:00 | Kokand 1912 vs Sogdiana | 3:2 | |
| 20.06.2017, 19:00 | Navbahor vs Olmaliq | 1:1 | |
| 20.06.2017, 19:00 | Shurtan vs Obod | 2:0 | |
| 20.06.2017, 19:00 | Buxoro vs Bunyodkor | 4:2 | |
| 20.06.2017, 19:00 | Lokomotiv vs Dinamo | 2:0 | |
| 24.06.2017, 18:30 | Obod vs Pakhtakor | 1:4 | |
| 25.06.2017, 18:15 | Dinamo vs Mashal | 0:0 | |
| 25.06.2017, 18:30 | Neftchi vs Metallurg | 0:2 | |
| 25.06.2017, 19:00 | Qizilqum vs Shurtan | 2:0 | |
| 25.06.2017, 19:00 | Nasaf vs Navbahor | 4:0 | |
| 25.06.2017, 19:00 | Olmaliq vs Kokand 1912 | 0:0 | |
| 25.06.2017, 19:00 | Sogdiana vs Buxoro | 1:2 | |
| 25.06.2017, 19:00 | Bunyodkor vs Lokomotiv | 1:0 | |
| 05.08.2017, 17:30 | Obod vs Navbahor | 0:2 | |
| 05.08.2017, 18:00 | Dinamo vs Metallurg | 0:3 | |
| 05.08.2017, 19:00 | Neftchi vs Shurtan | 1:1 | |
| 05.08.2017, 19:00 | Olmaliq vs Buxoro | 1:1 | |
| 06.08.2017, 19:00 | Qizilqum vs Pakhtakor | 1:1 | |
| 06.08.2017, 19:00 | Sogdiana vs Bunyodkor | 0:0 | |
| 06.08.2017, 19:30 | Nasaf vs Kokand 1912 | 3:0 | |
| 07.08.2017, 19:30 | Lokomotiv vs Mashal | 1:1 | |
| 11.08.2017, 19:30 | Bunyodkor vs Olmaliq | 1:0 | 678 |
| 12.08.2017, 17:30 | Metallurg vs Mashal | 0:1 | 1 169 |
| 12.08.2017, 17:30 | Kokand 1912 vs Obod | 1:0 | 5 500 |
| 12.08.2017, 19:00 | Sogdiana vs Lokomotiv | 0:4 | 3 220 |
| 12.08.2017, 19:00 | Shurtan vs Dinamo | 1:0 | 3 751 |
| 12.08.2017, 19:00 | Pakhtakor vs Neftchi | 6:0 | 6 155 |
| 12.08.2017, 19:00 | Navbahor vs Qizilqum | 3:2 | 6 323 |
| 12.08.2017, 19:00 | Buxoro vs Nasaf | 1:0 | 13 680 |
| 14.10.2017, 15:30 | Metallurg vs Bunyodkor | -:- | |
| 18.08.2017, 18:00 | Dinamo vs Pakhtakor | 0:0 | 10 350 |
| 18.08.2017, 19:00 | Metallurg vs Lokomotiv | 1:2 | 522 |
| 18.08.2017, 19:30 | Nasaf vs Bunyodkor | 0:1 | 8 517 |
| 19.08.2017, 17:30 | Obod vs Buxoro | 2:3 | |
| 19.08.2017, 18:30 | Mashal vs Shurtan | 4:0 | 1 823 |
| 19.08.2017, 19:00 | Neftchi vs Navbahor | 1:1 | 6 903 |
| 19.08.2017, 19:00 | Qizilqum vs Kokand 1912 | 3:1 | 6 501 |
| 19.08.2017, 19:00 | Olmaliq vs Sogdiana | 2:1 | 3 825 |
| 26.08.2017, 17:00 | Kokand 1912 vs Neftchi | 3:1 | 6 551 |
| 26.08.2017, 18:00 | Buxoro vs Qizilqum | 1:0 | |
| 26.08.2017, 18:30 | Shurtan vs Metallurg | 0:1 | 2 605 |
| 26.08.2017, 19:00 | Navbahor vs Dinamo | 1:0 | 6 083 |
| 26.08.2017, 19:00 | Bunyodkor vs Obod | 2:0 | |
| 26.09.2017, 17:00 | Sogdiana vs Nasaf | 0:3 | |
| 26.09.2017, 17:30 | Olmaliq vs Lokomotiv | 1:3 | |
| 26.09.2017, 19:00 | Pakhtakor vs Mashal | 3:1 | |
| 07.09.2017, 16:00 | Obod vs Sogdiana | 2:4 | 174 |
| 07.09.2017, 16:30 | Dinamo vs Kokand 1912 | 0:0 | |
| 07.09.2017, 17:30 | Neftchi vs Buxoro | 1:2 | 1 652 |
| 07.09.2017, 18:00 | Mashal vs Navbahor | 2:1 | |
| 08.09.2017, 18:45 | Nasaf vs Olmaliq | 1:0 | |
| 08.09.2017, 19:00 | Qizilqum vs Bunyodkor | 3:3 | |
| 08.09.2017, 19:00 | Lokomotiv vs Shurtan | 1:0 | |
| 09.09.2017, 16:30 | Metallurg vs Pakhtakor | 1:3 | |
| 15.09.2017, 18:00 | Bunyodkor vs Neftchi | 2:0 | |
| 16.09.2017, 16:30 | Kokand 1912 vs Mashal | 2:4 | |
| 16.09.2017, 18:00 | Navbahor vs Metallurg | 2:1 | |
| 16.09.2017, 18:00 | Buxoro vs Dinamo | 0:0 | |
| 16.09.2017, 18:00 | Sogdiana vs Qizilqum | 1:1 | |
| 16.09.2017, 18:45 | Nasaf vs Lokomotiv | 2:0 | |
| 16.09.2017, 19:00 | Pakhtakor vs Shurtan | 3:0 | |
| 17.09.2017, 17:30 | Olmaliq vs Obod | 1:0 | |
| 21.09.2017, 16:15 | Dinamo vs Bunyodkor | 0:2 | |
| 21.09.2017, 18:00 | Lokomotiv vs Pakhtakor | 0:1 | |
| 21.09.2017, 18:00 | Shurtan vs Navbahor | 3:3 | |
| 22.09.2017, 16:00 | Metallurg vs Kokand 1912 | 3:0 | |
| 22.09.2017, 16:00 | Obod vs Nasaf | 0:6 | |
| 22.09.2017, 17:00 | Neftchi vs Sogdiana | 1:1 | |
| 22.09.2017, 17:30 | Mashal vs Buxoro | 1:1 | |
| 22.09.2017, 18:30 | Qizilqum vs Olmaliq | 2:2 | |
| 29.09.2017, 16:00 | Obod vs Lokomotiv | 1:3 | |
| 30.09.2017, 15:45 | Kokand 1912 vs Shurtan | 4:1 | |
| 30.09.2017, 17:00 | Bunyodkor vs Mashal | 4:0 | |
| 30.09.2017, 17:00 | Sogdiana vs Dinamo | 0:0 | |
| 30.09.2017, 17:30 | Olmaliq vs Neftchi | 1:2 | |
| 30.09.2017, 18:00 | Buxoro vs Metallurg | 2:2 | |
| 30.09.2017, 18:00 | Nasaf vs Qizilqum | 2:0 | |
| 01.10.2017, 18:00 | Navbahor vs Pakhtakor | 2:0 | |
| 13.10.2017, 15:30 | Dinamo vs Olmaliq | 1:0 | |
| 13.10.2017, 16:30 | Mashal vs Sogdiana | 0:0 | |
| 13.10.2017, 16:30 | Neftchi vs Nasaf | 0:3 | |
| 13.10.2017, 16:30 | Lokomotiv vs Navbahor | 2:0 | |
| 14.10.2017, 16:00 | Metallurg vs Bunyodkor | 1:1 | |
| 14.10.2017, 16:30 | Shurtan vs Buxoro | 2:3 | |
| 14.10.2017, 17:00 | Pakhtakor vs Kokand 1912 | 2:0 | |
| 20.10.2017, 17:00 | Qizilqum vs Lokomotiv | 0:2 | |
| 20.10.2017, 17:00 | Sogdiana vs Metallurg | 3:2 | |
| 20.10.2017, 18:00 | Olmaliq vs Mashal | 2:1 | |
| 20.10.2017, 18:00 | Nasaf vs Dinamo | 3:0 | |
| 21.10.2017, 13:16 | Kokand 1912 vs Navbahor | 2:0 | |
| 21.10.2017, 17:00 | Buxoro vs Pakhtakor | 0:2 | |
| 21.10.2017, 17:00 | Bunyodkor vs Shurtan | 3:1 | |
| 25.10.2017, 16:30 | Lokomotiv vs Kokand 1912 | 3:0 | |
| 26.10.2017, 15:00 | Metallurg vs Olmaliq | 3:2 | |
| 26.10.2017, 16:00 | Mashal vs Nasaf | 1:2 | |
| 26.10.2017, 16:30 | Neftchi vs Qizilqum | 2:0 | |
| 26.10.2017, 17:00 | Navbahor vs Buxoro | 1:0 | |
| 26.10.2017, 18:00 | Pakhtakor vs Bunyodkor | 1:0 | |
| 27.10.2017, 16:00 | Shurtan vs Sogdiana | 3:1 | |
| 03.11.2017, 16:00 | Neftchi vs Lokomotiv | 0:0 | |
| 03.11.2017, 17:00 | Sogdiana vs Pakhtakor | 0:1 | |
| 03.11.2017, 17:00 | Bunyodkor vs Navbahor | 2:2 | |
| 04.11.2017, 15:30 | Olmaliq vs Shurtan | 3:1 | |
| 04.11.2017, 17:00 | Nasaf vs Metallurg | 2:0 | |
| 04.11.2017, 17:00 | Qizilqum vs Dinamo | 1:0 | |
| 04.11.2017, 17:00 | Buxoro vs Kokand 1912 | 2:2 | |
| 08.11.2017, 15:00 | Dinamo vs Neftchi | 1:0 | |
| 08.11.2017, 16:00 | Mashal vs Qizilqum | 4:0 | |
| 08.11.2017, 16:30 | Lokomotiv vs Buxoro | 2:0 | |
| 08.11.2017, 17:00 | Navbahor vs Sogdiana | 4:1 | |
| 09.11.2017, 15:00 | Kokand 1912 vs Bunyodkor | 2:5 | |
| 09.11.2017, 17:00 | Nasaf vs Shurtan | 3:0 | |
| 09.11.2017, 17:00 | Pakhtakor vs Olmaliq | 2:0 | |
| 19.11.2017, 14:00 | Dinamo vs Lokomotiv | 1:5 | |
| 19.11.2017, 14:00 | Neftchi vs Mashal | 2:1 | |
| 19.11.2017, 14:00 | Qizilqum vs Metallurg | 2:1 | |
| 19.11.2017, 14:00 | Sogdiana vs Kokand 1912 | 2:1 | |
| 19.11.2017, 14:00 | Olmaliq vs Navbahor | 2:1 | |
| 19.11.2017, 14:00 | Bunyodkor vs Buxoro | 3:0 | |
| 19.11.2017, 14:00 | Nasaf vs Pakhtakor | 4:0 | |
| 25.11.2017, 14:00 | Mashal vs Dinamo | 1:0 | |
| 25.11.2017, 14:00 | Metallurg vs Neftchi | 1:0 | |
| 25.11.2017, 14:00 | Navbahor vs Nasaf | 1:0 | |
| 25.11.2017, 14:00 | Shurtan vs Qizilqum | 1:1 | |
| 25.11.2017, 14:00 | Kokand 1912 vs Olmaliq | 1:2 | |
| 25.11.2017, 14:00 | Buxoro vs Sogdiana | 1:0 | |
| 25.11.2017, 14:00 | Lokomotiv vs Bunyodkor | 3:2 | |

== Season statistics ==
=== Top scorers ===
As of 25 November 2017

| # | Player | Club | Goals (Pen) |
|---|---|---|---|
| 1 | (Uzbekistan) Marat Bikmaev | Lokomotiv | 27 (6) |
| 2 | (Serbia) Dragan Ćeran | Nasaf | 19 (4) |
| 3 | (Uzbekistan) Dostonbek Khamdamov | Bunyodkor | 14 (1) |
| 3 | (Uzbekistan) Sanzhar Rashidov | Sogdiana | 14 (3) |
| 5 | (Uzbekistan) Igor Sergeev | Pakhtakor | 13 (3) |
| 6 | (Uzbekistan) Zokhir Abdullaev | Metalurg Bekabad | 12 (0) |
| 7 | (Uzbekistan) Sukhrob Berdiev | Kokand 1912 | 11 (0) |

Source: Soccerway
