= Uzbekistan Football Coach of the Year =

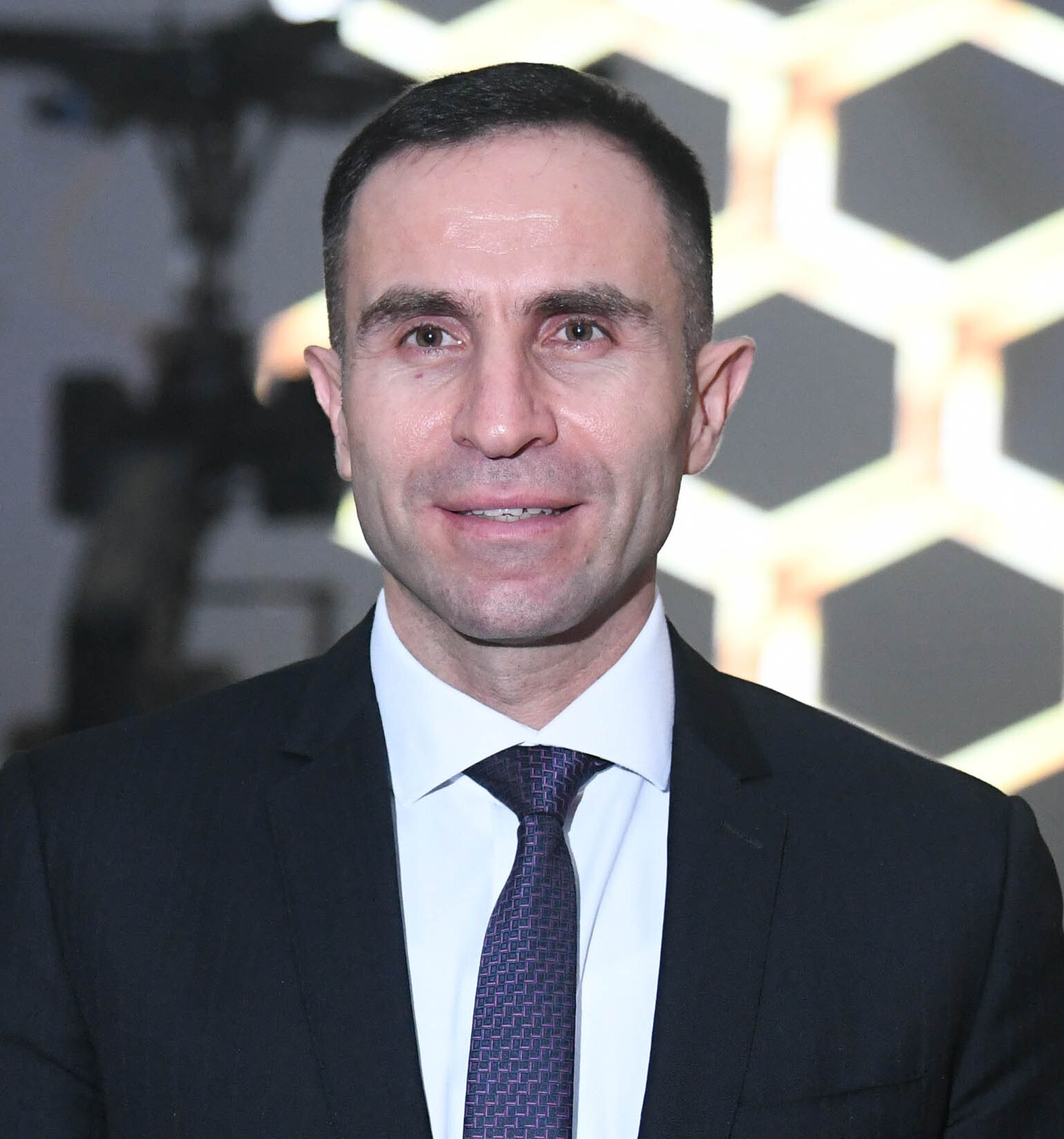
Timur Kapadze was awarded three times

The Uzbekistan Football Coach of the Year (Uzbek:Yilning eng yaxshi futbol murabbiyi or Йилнинг энг яхши футбол мураббийи) is a yearly award organized by the Uzbekistan Football Association and given to the Uzbek football coach who is considered to have performed the best during the year.

== History ==
The award has been given since 1996. Igor Shkvyrin and Mirjalol Kasymov are the only people to have won both Coach of the Year and Footballer of the Year awards.

== Coach of the Year Award Winners ==
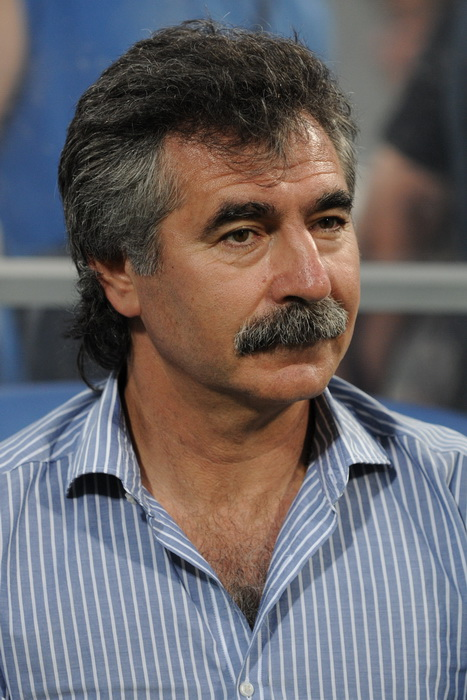
Vadim Abramov award winner in 2011, 2019

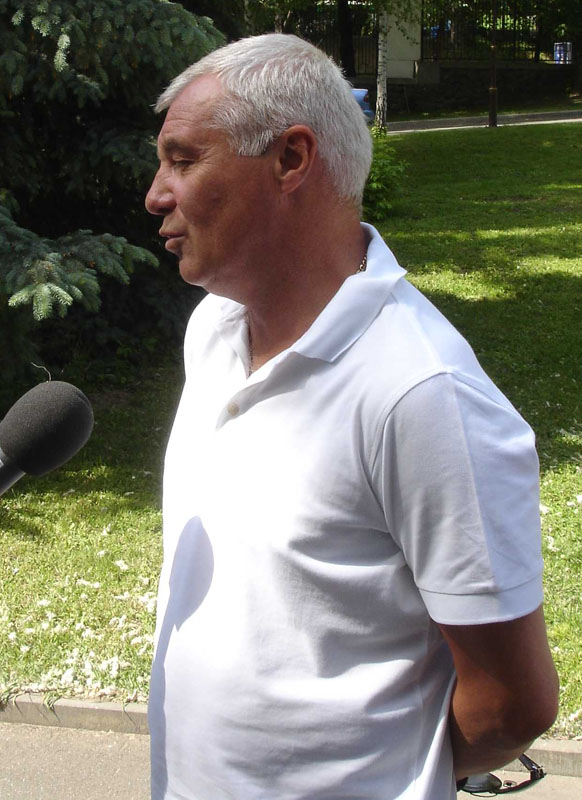
Anatoliy Demyanenko, who was 3rd in 2011

Year	Place	Coach	Club	Points
1996	1	(Uzbekistan) Viktor Djalilov	Navbahor Namangan	
1996	2	(Uzbekistan) Yuriy Sarkisyan	Neftchi Farg'ona	
1996	3	(Uzbekistan) Rustam Mirsodiqov	MHSK Tashkent	
1997	1	(Uzbekistan) Rustam Mirsodiqov	MHSK Tashkent	
1997	2	(Uzbekistan) Yuriy Sarkisyan	Neftchi Farg'ona	
1997	3	(Uzbekistan) Viktor Borisov	Nasaf Qarshi	
1998	1	(Uzbekistan) Yuriy Sarkisyan	Neftchi Farg'ona	
1998	2	(Uzbekistan) Bahrom Khakimov	Temiryulchi Qo'qo'n	
1998	3	Aleksandr Myagkov	Sogdiana Jizzakh	
1999	1	(Uzbekistan) Yuriy Sarkisyan	Neftchi Farg'ona	
1999	2	(Ukraine) Serhiy Shevchenko	FK Andijan	
1999	3	(Uzbekistan) Rustam Mirsodiqov	Dustlik	
2000	1	(Uzbekistan) Bahrom Khakimov	Nasaf Qarshi	
2000	2	(Uzbekistan) Yuriy Sarkisyan	Neftchi Farg'ona	
2000	3	(Ukraine) Serhiy Shevchenko	Qizilqum Zarafshon	
2001	1	(Uzbekistan) Yuriy Sarkisyan	Neftchi Farg'ona	
2001	2	(Uzbekistan) Bahrom Khakimov	Nasaf Qarshi	
2001	3	(Ukraine) Serhiy Shevchenko	Qizilqum Zarafshon	
2002	1	(Uzbekistan) Viktor Djalilov	Pakhtakor	
2002	2	(Uzbekistan) Yuriy Sarkisyan	Neftchi Farg'ona	
2002	3	(Uzbekistan) Viktor Borisov	Mash'al Mubarek	
2003	1	(Uzbekistan) Yuriy Sarkisyan	Neftchi Farg'ona	
2003	2	(Uzbekistan) Viktor Borisov	Uzbekistan U-21	
2003	3	(Uzbekistan) Viktor Djalilov	Navbahor Namangan	
2004	1	(Turkmenistan) Tachmurad Agamuradov	Pakhtakor	
2004	2	(Uzbekistan) Yuriy Sarkisyan	Neftchi Farg'ona	
2004	3	(Germany) Hans-Jürgen Gede	Uzbekistan	
2005	1	(Uzbekistan) Viktor Djalilov	Mash'al Mubarek	274
2005	2	(Uzbekistan) Ravshan Khaydarov	Pakhtakor	211
2005	3	(Uzbekistan) Vadim Abramov	Traktor Tashkent	175
2006	1	(Uzbekistan) Yuriy Sarkisyan	Neftchi Farg'ona	449
2006	2	(Uzbekistan) Rauf Inileev	Uzbekistan U-23	439
2006	3	(Uzbekistan) Ravshan Khaydarov	Pakhtakor	195
2007	1	(Uzbekistan) Rauf Inileev	Uzbekistan	378
2007	2	(Uzbekistan) Ravshan Khaydarov	Pakhtakor	170
2007	3	(Russia) Viktor Kumykov	Mash'al Mubarek	89
2008	1	(Uzbekistan) Akhmad Ubaydullaev	Uzbekistan U-19	166
2008	2	(Uzbekistan) Mirjalol Kasymov	Bunyodkor	158
2008	3	(Uzbekistan) Yuriy Sarkisyan	Neftchi Farg'ona	43
2009	1	(Uzbekistan) Igor Shkvyrin	Olmaliq FK	332
2009	2	(Russia) Viktor Kumykov	Nasaf Qarshi	105
2009	3	(Uzbekistan) Azamat Abduraimov	Dynamo Samarkand	95
2010	1	(Uzbekistan) Aleksey Evstafeev	Uzbekistan U-16	172
2010	2	(Uzbekistan) Mirjalol Kasymov	Bunyodkor	110
2010	3	(Germany) Edgar Gess	Shurtan Guzar	75
2011	1	(Uzbekistan) Vadim Abramov	Uzbekistan	271
2011	2	(Uzbekistan) Aleksey Evstafeev	Uzbekistan U-17	179
2011	3	(Ukraine) Anatoliy Demyanenko	Nasaf Qarshi	108
2012	1	(Uzbekistan) Mirjalol Kasymov	Uzbekistan/Bunyodkor	466
2012	2	(Uzbekistan) Dilshod Nuraliev	Uzbekistan U-16	284
2012	3	(Uzbekistan) Murod Ismailov	Pakhtakor	116
2013	1	(Uzbekistan) Ruziqul Berdiev	Nasaf Qarshi	120
2013	2	(Uzbekistan) Mirjalol Kasymov	Uzbekistan/Bunyodkor	108
2013	3	(Uzbekistan) Dilshod Nuraliev	Uzbekistan U-17	85
2014	1	(Uzbekistan) Samvel Babayan	Pakhtakor	254
2014	2	(Uzbekistan) Ruziqul Berdiev	Nasaf Qarshi	138
2014	3	(Uzbekistan) Vadim Abramov	Lokomotiv Tashkent	133
2015	1	(Uzbekistan) Samvel Babayan	Uzbekistan	60
2015	2	(Uzbekistan) Ruziqul Berdiev	Nasaf Qarshi	44
2015	3	(Uzbekistan) Ravshan Khaydarov	Uzbekistan U-20	10
2016	1	(Australia) Mirko Jelicic	Lokomotiv Tashkent	32
2016	2	(Uzbekistan) Andrey Miklyaev	Lokomotiv Tashkent	22
2016	3	(Uzbekistan) Jasur Abduraimov	Uzbekistan U-18	13
2017	1	(Uzbekistan) Ruziqul Berdiev	Nasaf Qarshi	
2017	2-3	(Uzbekistan) Mirjalol Kasymov	Bunyodkor	
2017	2-3	(Uzbekistan) Ulugbek Bakaev	Bukhoro	
2018	1	(Uzbekistan) Ravshan Khaydarov	Uzbekistan U-23	
2018	2	(Uzbekistan) Mirjalol Kasymov	Bunyodkor	
2018	3	(Russia) Andrei Fyodorov	Lokomotiv Tashkent	
2019	1	(Uzbekistan) Vadim Abramov	Uzbekistan	
2019	2	(Uzbekistan) Ruziqul Berdiev	Nasaf Qarshi	
2019	3	(Uzbekistan) Ulugbek Bakaev	Sogdiana Jizzakh	
2020	1	(Uzbekistan) Ruziqul Berdiev	Nasaf Qarshi	154
2020	2	(Uzbekistan) Mirjalol Kasymov	Bunyodkor	94
2020	3	(Uzbekistan) Vadim Abramov	Uzbekistan	44
2021	1	(Uzbekistan) Ruziqul Berdiev	Nasaf Qarshi	154
2021	2	(Uzbekistan) Timur Kapadze	Olympic FC and Uzbekistan U-19	113
2021	3	(Uzbekistan) Ulugbek Bakaev	Sogdiana Jizzakh	93
2022	1	(Uzbekistan) Timur Kapadze	Uzbekistan U-23	
2023	1	(Uzbekistan) Ravshan Khaydarov	Uzbekistan U-20	
2024	1	(Uzbekistan) Timur Kapadze	Uzbekistan U-23	
2025	1	(Uzbekistan) Timur Kapadze	Uzbekistan and Navbahor	

=== By coach ===
Coach	Winner	2nd	3rd	Winning Years
Yuriy Sarkisyan	5	5	1	1998, 1999, 2001, 2003, 2006
Ruziqul Berdiev	5	3		2013, 2016, 2017, 2020, 2021
Timur Kapadze	3	1		2022, 2024, 2025
Viktor Djalilov	3		1	1996, 2002, 2005
Ravshan Khaydarov	2	2	2	2018, 2023
Vadim Abramov	2	1	2	2011, 2019
Samvel Babayan	2			2014, 2015
Mirjalol Kasymov	1	6		2012
Bahrom Khakimov	1	2		2000
Aleksey Evstafeev	1	1		2010
Rauf Inileev	1	1		2007
Rustam Mirsodiqov	1		2	1997
Tachmurad Agamuradov	1			2004
Akhmad Ubaydullaev	1			2008
Igor Shkvyrin	1			2009
Viktor Borisov		1	2	
Serhiy Shevchenko		1	2	
Dilshod Nuraliev		1	1	
Viktor Kumykov		1	1	
Andrey Miklayev		1		
Ulugbek Bakaev			2	
Anatoliy Demyanenko			1	
Hans-Jürgen Gede			1	
Edgar Gess			1	
Murod Ismailov			1	
Aleksandr Myagkov			1	
Jasur Abduraimov			1	
Azamat Abduraimov			1	
Andrei Fyodorov			1	

=== By team ===
Club	Coaches	Total	Years
Neftchi Farg'ona	1	5	1998, 1999, 2001, 2003, 2006
Uzbekistan	6	5	2007, 2011, 2012, 2015, 2019, 2025
Nasaf Qarshi	4	5	2000, 2013, 2016, 2020, 2021
Pakhtakor	3	3	2002, 2004, 2014
Uzbekistan U-23	3	3	2018, 2022
MHSK Tashkent	1	1	1997
Mash'al Mubarek	1	1	2005
Olmaliq FK	1	1	2009
Uzbekistan U-19	1	1	2008
Uzbekistan U-16	1	1	2010
Navbahor	1	1	2025
Uzbekistan U-20	1	1	2023

== See also ==
- Uzbekistan Footballer of the Year
