= Maksud Karimov =

Uzbekistani footballer

Personal information
- Full name: Maksud Karimov
- Date of birth: 2 March 1985 (age 41)
- Place of birth: Uzbekistan
- Height: 1.81 m (5 ft 11 in)
- Position: Defender

Team information
- Current team: Nasaf Qarshi
- Number: 4

Senior career*
Years	Team	Apps	(Gls)
2010–	Nasaf Qarshi	100	(6)

International career^{‡}
2010–	Uzbekistan	3	(0)
- * Club domestic league appearances and goals as of 14 March 2013 ‡ National team caps and goals as of 14 March 2013

Maksud Karimov (Uzbek: Maqsud Karimov or Мақсуд Каримов; born 2 March 1985) is an Uzbek footballer. He currently plays as defender for Nasaf Qarshi.

== Career ==
Since 2010 he has played for Nasaf Qarshi. Karimov is one of the leading players of the club. In 2011, he won AFC Cup with Nasaf.

== International ==
He has played 3 matches for Uzbekistan, beginning with a 2010 friendly match against Armenia.

== Honors ==
- Uzbek League runner-up (1): 2011
- Uzbek Cup runner-up (2): 2011, 2012
- AFC Cup winner (1): 2011

== Career statistics ==
=== Club ===
Statistics accurate as of 14 March 2013

Club	Season	League		Cup		AFC		Total	
Club	Season	Apps	Goals	Apps	Goals	Apps	Goals	Apps	Goals
Nasaf Qarshi	2010	23	0	0	0	4	1	27	1
Nasaf Qarshi	2011	21	1	6	0	12	1	39	2
Nasaf Qarshi	2012	22	0	6	1	4	2	32	3
Nasaf Qarshi	2013	2	0	0	0	0	0	2	0
Career total		68	1	12	3	20	4	100	6
