= Ruziqul Berdiev =

Football Manager

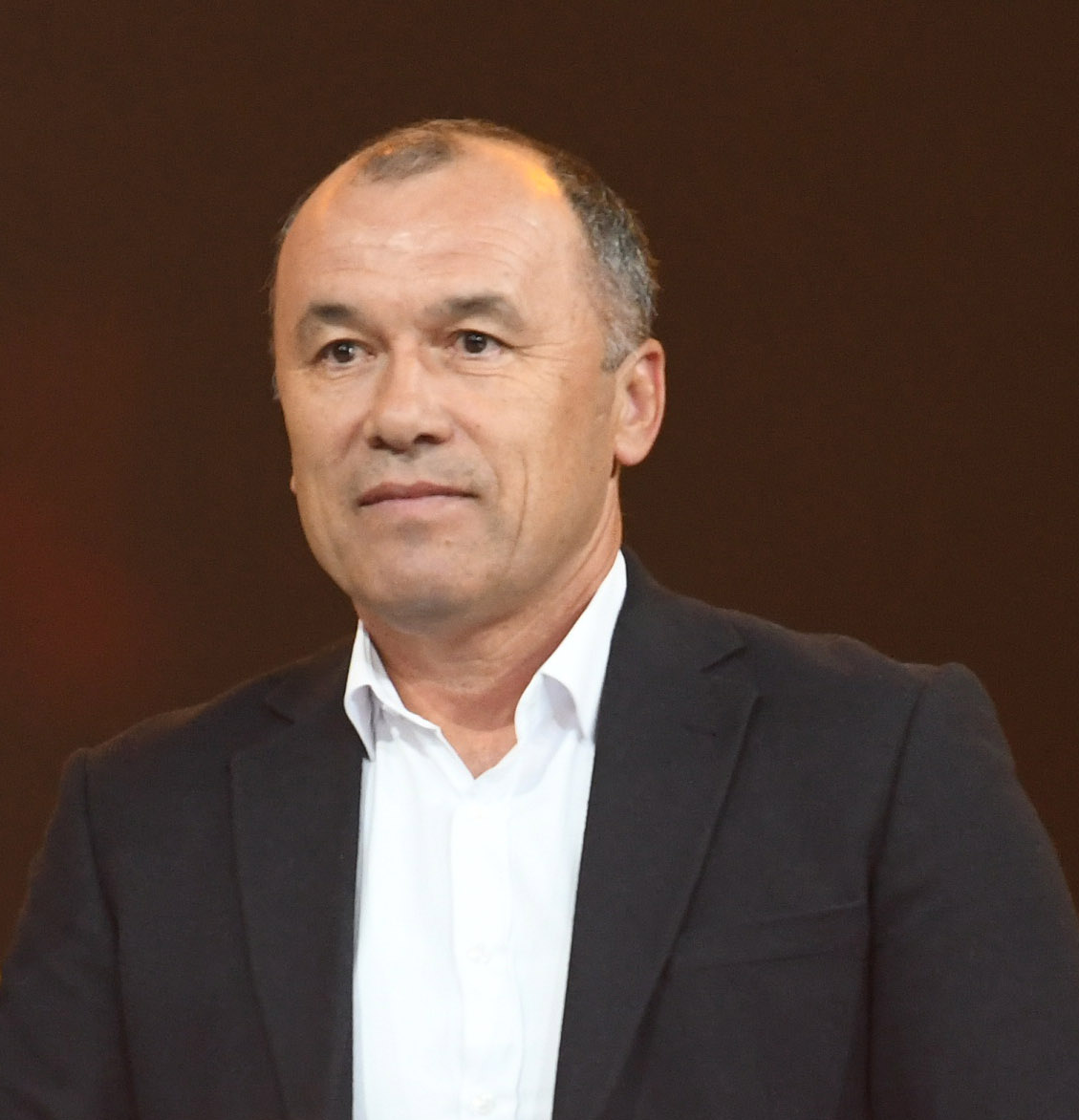
- Ruziqul Berdiev, 2022

Personal information
- Full name: Ruziqul Sadullaevich Berdiev
- Date of birth: 22 October 1971 (age 55)
- Place of birth: Kitob, Uzbek SSR, Soviet Union (now Uzbekistan)
- Height: 1.72 m (5 ft 8 in)
- Position: Midfielder

Team information
- Current team: Nasaf (manager)

Senior career*
Years	Team	Apps	(Gls)
1992–1996	Yangiyer	80	(4)
1994	→ Guliston (loan)	14	(0)
1997–2008	Nasaf	314	(59)
Total		408	(63)

Managerial career
- 2008–2011: Nasaf
- 2012: Nasaf (assistant)
- 2012: Nasaf (youth team)
- 2013–: Nasaf
- 2017: Uzbekistan (caretaker)
- * Club domestic league appearances and goals

Ruziqul Berdiev (Uzbek: Roʻziqul Berdiyev; born 27 October 1971) is an Uzbekistani professional football manager and former player who is the manager of Super League club Nasaf.

== Career ==
From 1992 to 1996 he played for the club "Yangiyer". From 1997 to 2008, until the end of his football career, he played for "Nasaf".

Since 2008, he began his coaching career. Until 2011, he was one of the assistants to the head coach of Nasaf, including an assistant to Anatoliy Demyanenko, who worked at Nasaf in 2010-2011 and won the AFC Cup with this club. After Demyanenko's resignation in January 2012, he became the head coach of Nasaf, and worked in this position until May of the same year. After that, he headed the youth team of this club. In November 2012, he was again appointed head coach of Nasaf, and has been working with this club to this day.

On October 20, 2017, he was temporarily appointed acting head coach of the Uzbekistan national team. Under Berdyev's leadership, the Uzbekistan national team played a friendly match with the UAE national team, in which they lost with a minimal score of 1:0.

== Honours ==
=== Manager ===
Nasaf

- Uzbekistan Super League (1): 2024
- Uzbek Cup (4): 2015, 2021, 2022, 2023
- Uzbekistan Super Cup (3): 2015, 2023, 2024
- AFC Cup runners-up: 2021

=== Individual ===
- Uzbekistan Football Coach of the Year: (5) 2013, 2016, 2017, 2020, 2021
- Uzbekistan Super League Coach of the Month: April 2025
