= Club 200 of Berador Abduraimov =

In Uzbek football, the Club 200 of Berador Abduraimov is club of the best goalscorers with over 200 goals in the history of Uzbek football. The club is named after the famous Pakhtakor player, Berador Abduraimov.

== History ==
The "Club 200 of Berador Abduraimov" was founded 2001 by an initiative of the Uzbekistan Football Federation and football magazine "Nash Futbol". Figure 200 in the name of the club derives from the number of goals scored by Berador Abduraimov, one of the best strikers and football legends in Uzbek football.

== List of players ==
The club members are sorted by birth date.

#	Nat.	Name	Championships	Cups	National	International	Total	Ref
1	(Soviet Union)	Gennadi Krasnitsky	142	9	14	32	202	
2	(Soviet Union)	Berador Abduraimov	151	15	23	32	221	
3	(Soviet Union)	Yuriy Sarkisyan	223	-	-	18	241	
4	(Soviet Union)	Petr Ageev	220	6	-	2	228	
5	(Soviet Union)	Furqat Esanbaev	214	-	-	-	235	
6	(Soviet Union) / (Uzbekistan)	Igor Shkvyrin	231	21	21	12	275	
7	(Soviet Union) / (Uzbekistan)	Azamat Abduraimov	162	17	39	40	260	
8	(Soviet Union) / (Uzbekistan)	Ravshan Bozorov	264	32	6	14	316	
9	(Soviet Union) / (Uzbekistan)	Rustam Durmonov	171	40	4	1	216	
10	(Soviet Union) / (Uzbekistan)	Mirjalol Kasymov	112	39	46	13	210	
11	(Soviet Union) / (Uzbekistan)	Oybek Usmankhojaev	163	31	2	9	205	
12	(Soviet Union) / (Uzbekistan)	Jafar Irismetov	210	31	18	15	264	

== See also ==
- Grigory Fedotov club
- Gennadi Krasnitsky club
