= Viktor Djalilov =

Uzbek football manager (1952–2023)

Viktor Djalilov Виктор Джалилов
Personal information
- Full name: Viktor Romanovich Djalilov
- Date of birth: 17 March 1952
- Place of birth: Tashkent, Uzbek SSR, Soviet Union
- Date of death: May 2023 (aged 71)

Managerial career
- Years: Team
- Sohibkor (Halkobod)
- 1992–1994: Politotdel
- 1995–1999: Navbahor
- 2000–2002: Pakhtakor Tashkent (assistant)
- 2002–2003: Pakhtakor Tashkent
- 2005–: Mash'al Mubarek
- 2008–2009: Pakhtakor Tashkent
- 2010: Navbahor
- 2010–2011: Dynamo Samarkand
- 2015: Uzbekistan U22

Viktor Romanovich Djalilov (Uzbek: Viktor Romanovich Jalilov, Russian: Виктор Романович Джалилов; 17 March 1952 – 7 May 2023) was an Uzbek football manager.

== Managing career ==
Djalilov started his managing career at Sohibkor Halkabod. In 1992, he was head coach of Politotdel which was promoted to Uzbek League, finishing, in First League, as runner-up after Shifokor Guliston.

From 1995 to 1999, Djalilov was head coach of Navbahor Namangan. Navbahor won the Uzbek League in 1996 and the Uzbek Cup twice in this period and four times finished third in the league. In 1996, he was named Coach of the Year by the Uzbekistan Football Federation. He won this award twice more, with Pakhtakor in 2002 and Mash'al Mubarek (2005).

From 2002, he was on the coaching staff of Pakhtakor Tashkent. On 19 February 2002, the club's management appointed Djalilov head coach, replacing Sergey Butenko.

In the 2002–03 AFC Champions League on 9 April 2003, Pakhtakor lost the first leg match of the semifinal 3–1 to BEC Tero Sasana and in the home match on 22 April Pakhtakor won 1–0. After that match, Djalilov resigned his post and his successor Tachmurad Agamuradov who was already working as a consulting coach became the new coach of Pakhtakor. Djalilov remained in the club. In 2005, Djalilov finished runner-up in the league with Mash'al Mubarek.

On 22 October 2008, Pakhtakor appointed the experienced Victor Djalilov as acting coach, after Ravshan Khaydarov resigned his job (the club lost 2–1 to Metallurg Bekabad, widening the gap between Kuruvchi).

Djalilov resigned his position after Pakhtakor appointed a new head coach, Miodrag Radulović, on 21 December 2009. In January 2009, Djalilov was appointed head coach of Navbahor.

On 23 September 2010, he became head coach of Dynamo Samarkand. After matchday 11 of the 2011 Uzbek League, Djalilov was sacked from his position for an unsuccessful start to the season; the club had won only two out of eleven matches.

In September 2011, Djalilov moved back to Pakhtakor and became general manager, director of the club.

On 23 June 2015, UFF appointed him the head coach of Uzbekistan U23 national team.

== Death ==
Djalilov died in May 2023, at the age of 71.

== Honours as manager ==
- Uzbekistan Football Coach of the Year: 1996, 2002, 2005
- Uzbek League: 1996, 2002
- Uzbek Cup: 1995, 1997, 2002, 2009
- AFC Champions League semi-final: 2002–03
