= Marat Kabayev =

Uzbekistani footballer and coach

Personal information
- Full name: Marat Vazykhovich Kabayev
- Date of birth: 27 May 1961 (age 65)
- Place of birth: Uzun, Uzbek SSR, Soviet Union
- Height: 1.78 m (5 ft 10 in)
- Positions: Striker; midfielder

Team information
- Current team: Rubin Kazan (scout manager)

Senior career*
Years	Team	Apps	(Gls)
1980–1986	Pakhtakor Tashkent	155	(24)
1986	SKA Rostov-on-Don	20	(2)
1987–1988	Pakhtakor Tashkent	84	(21)
1989	Dnipro Dnipropetrovsk	1	(0)
1989–1990	Pakhtakor Tashkent	36	(2)
1991	Umid Tashkent	17	(7)
1991–1994	Traktor Pavlodar	109	(28)
1996	Kaisar	25	(0)
1997	Mezhdurechensk	11	(0)
1997	Samarqand-Dinamo	5	(0)

Managerial career
- 2004–2005: Traktor Tashkent (assistant)
- 2008–2009: Olmaliq FK (reserves)
- 2009–2010: Uzbekistan U-19
- 2011: Qizilqum Zarafshon
- 2012–: Rubin Kazan (scout coach)
- * Club domestic league appearances and goals

Marat Vazykhovich Kabayev (Russian: Марат Вазыхович Кабаев, Tatar: Марат Вазыйх улы Кабаев, romanized: Marat Wazıyx ulı Qabaev; born 27 May 1961) is an Uzbekistani professional football coach and former football player.

== Personal life ==
Kabayev was born in a Tatar family. He is the president of the International Association of Islamic Business. He is the father of the retired rhythmic gymnast and politician Alina Kabayeva.

== Playing career ==
Kabayev started his career in 1979 at Avtomobilist Termez. In 1980, he moved to Pakhtakor. On 28 September 1980, he made his debut for Pakhtakor in a match against Karpaty Lviv. In 1986, he played for SKA Rostov-on-Don and one year later moved back to Pakhtakor and became top goalscorer of the club in 1987 season. He finished his playing career in 1997.

== Managerial career ==
After finishing his playing, Kabayev began a managerial career. In 2004–2005, he was assistant coach at Traktor Tashkent. In 2009, he was appointed as head coach of the Uzbekistan U-18 team. In the 2010 AFC U-19 Championship, the Uzbekistan U-19 team reached the quarter-finals, losing to Saudi Arabia U-19 by 1–2 in extra time.

In 2011, Kabayev was appointed as head coach of Qizilqum Zarafshon. Since 2012, he works at Rubin Kazan as a scout coach.

== Honours ==
Dnipro

- Soviet Top League runner-up: 1989

Pakhtakor

- Soviet First League runner-up: 1990

Navbahor

- Uzbek Cup: 1995
