= Qizilqum FC =

Qizilqum
- Full name: Профессиональный футбольный клуб "Кызылкум"
- Nicknames: The Golddiggers, The Miners
- Founded: 1967; 59 years ago
- Ground: Yoshlar Stadium, Navoiy
- Capacity: 10,000
- Manager: Jamshid Saidov
- League: Uzbekistan Super League
- 2025: Uzbekistan Super League, 9th of 16
Home colours	Away colours

Qizilqum Zarafshon (Uzbek: Qizilqum futbol klubi), is an Uzbek professional football club based in Navoiy. They play in the Uzbekistan Super League. The club is named after the Qizilqum desert, the biggest in Central Asia. Qizilqum in Uzbek means "red sands".

== History ==
FC Qizilqum old logo till 2014

Qizilqum was founded in 1967 under the name Progress. The club changed its name several times and was known as Qizilqum before becoming known as Progress. Since 1997 it has played as Qizilqum. The club made its debut in the Uzbek League in 2000. In its first season the club finished in 11th position. One year later, in the 2001 season, the club finished in 6th place in final League table. At the end of the 2002 season the club finished in 3rd position behind runners-up Neftchi Farg'ona which is their highest finishing position in the Uzbek League to date. Since 2000 the club has consequently played in the top league of Uzbek football.

=== Name changes history ===
- 1967—1994: Progress
- 1994—1995: Qizilqum
- 1995—1997: Progress
- 1997: Qizilqum

=== Domestic history ===
Season	League									Uzbekistan Cup	Top goalscorer		Manager
Season	Div.	Pos.	Pl.	W	D	L	GS	GA	P	Uzbekistan Cup	Name	League	Manager
1992	2nd	13th	30	7	3	20	29	76	17	Round of 32			
1993	2nd	14th	30	9	5	16	31	41	23	Round of 32			
1994	2nd	5th	34	16	10	8	54	36	42				
1995	2nd	5th	22	11	4	7	42	27	37	Round of 16			
1996	2nd	3rd	52	33	10	9	119	58	109	Playoff Round	(Uzbekistan) Vitaly Avanesov	31	
1997	2nd	4th	42	23	7	12	74	43	76	Playoff Round			
1998	2nd	7th	38	20	4	14	74	48	64	Round of 16			
1999	2nd	3rd	34	25	6	3	84	27	81	-			
2000	1st	11th	38	13	12	13	46	55	51	R16			
2001	1st	6th	34	16	5	43	48	35	53	Quarterfinal			
2002	1st	3rd	30	18	5	7	67	34	59	Semifinal			
2003	1st	5th	30	17	4	9	59	33	55	Round of 16			
2004	1st	11th	26	6	7	13	28	48	25	Quarterfinal			
2005	1st	7th	26	11	4	11	33	32	37	Round of 16			
2006	1st	6th	30	14	6	10	51	37	48	Round of 16			
2007	1st	7th	30	12	3	15	42	64	39	Round of 32	(Uzbekistan) Timur Islomov	10	
2008	1st	14th	30	9	5	16	27	44	32	Round of 32			
2009	1st	14th	30	10	5	15	33	56	35	Quarterfinal			(Uzbekistan) Rustam Zabirov
2010	1st	8th	30	9	7	10	25	28	34	Round of 16	(Uzbekistan) Leonid Koshelev (Ukraine) Volodymyr Postolatyev	5	(Uzbekistan) Sergei Arslanov
2011	1st	13th	26	6	6	14	23	40	24	Round of 16	(Uzbekistan) Bakhriddin Vakhobov	6	(Uzbekistan) Marat Kabayev (Uzbekistan) Sergei Arslanov
2012	1st	11th	26	6	9	11	22	41	27	Round of 16	(Uzbekistan) Gulom Urunov (Uzbekistan) Feruz Babakulov	5	(Uzbekistan) Ravshan Khaydarov
2013	1st	12th	26	8	1	17	28	48	25	Quarterfinal	(Uzbekistan) Zafar Turayev	5	(Uzbekistan) Ravshan Khaydarov (Uzbekistan) Rustam Zabirov (Uzbekistan) Yuriy Lukin
2014	1st	11th	26	7	6	13	23	34	27	Round of 16	(Uzbekistan) Vladimir Shishelov (Georgia (country)) Giorgi Kvesieshvili (Uzbekistan) Akmal Rustamov (Uzbekistan) Sherali Djuraev	3	(Uzbekistan) Yuriy Lukin
2015	1st	10th	30	10	4	16	38	49	34	Round of 32	(Uzbekistan) Bakhriddin Vakhobov	21	(Uzbekistan) Yuriy Lukin
2016	1st	6th	30	14	8	8	41	32	50	Third round	(Serbia) Nemanja Jovanović	8	(Uzbekistan) Yuriy Lukin
2017	1st	11th	30	9	10	11	31	40	37	Third round	(Uzbekistan) Ivan Nagaev	10	(Uzbekistan) Yuriy Lukin
2018	1st	8th	20	9	4	7	26	26	31	Quarterfinal	(Turkmenistan) Artur Geworkýan	9	(Uzbekistan) Hamidjon Aktamov
2019	1st	13th	26	5	9	12	24	48	24	R16	(Georgia (country)) Elgujja Grigalashvili	4	(Uzbekistan) Hamidjon Aktamov
2020	1st	11th	26	5	10	11	19	37	25	Quarterfinal	(Uzbekistan) Oybek Kilichev	5	(Uzbekistan) Hamidjon Aktamov (Turkmenistan) Täçmyrat Agamyradow (Uzbekistan) Hamidjon Aktamov
2021	1st	9th	26	7	10	9	26	29	31	Quarterfinal	(Georgia (country)) Elgujja Grigalashvili	9	(Uzbekistan) Hamidjon Aktamov
2022	1st	5th	26	12	3	11	34	36	39	Quarterfinal	(Uzbekistan) Temurkhuja Abdukholiqov	13	(Serbia) Nikola Lazarevic
2023	1st	12th											
2024	1st	11th											
2025	1st	9th											

== Stadium ==
The club's home ground is Progress Stadium which has a capacity of 5,000 and is located in Zarafshan. In August 2013 the Progress Stadium was closed for reconstruction. From August 2013 to May 2014 the club played its home matches in the 10,000-seater Sogdiana Stadium in Navoiy. The Sogdiana Stadium is the home ground of the Navoiy club, FC Yuzhanin Navoiy. In May 2014 the club moved to another newly built stadium located in Navoiy, the Yoshlar Stadium, to play its home matches.

Yoshlar Stadium with the attached sporting complex was built for Umid nihollari 2012; the republican sports games among school students. The construction work of the 12,500-all seater stadium and sporting complex started in April 2011 and finished in 2012. The sporting complex includes two indoor courts for volleyball, handball, basketball and other facilities. The festive opening of the new Yoshlar Stadium was held in May 2012 with the opening of the Umid nihollari 2012 games. In November 2012 the AFC awarded the new stadium A category class. The first official football match was played on 3 May 2014. This was a League match between Qizilqum and Dinamo Samarkand.

== Honours ==
- Uzbek League
  - Third place: 2002

== Managers ==
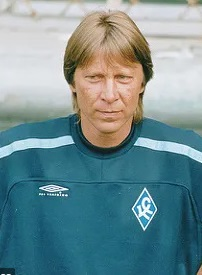
Igor Shkvyrin, who scored 20 goals for Uzbekistan, became the manager of Qizilqum FC

- (Uzbekistan) Rustam Zabirov (2008–2010)
- (Uzbekistan) Sergei Arslanov (2008–2010), caretaker
- (Uzbekistan) Marat Kabaev (2011)
- (Uzbekistan) Sergei Arslanov (2011), caretaker
- (Uzbekistan) Ravshan Khaydarov (January 2012– April 2013)
- (Uzbekistan) Rustam Zabirov (April 2013– July 2013)
- (Uzbekistan) Yuriy Lukin (July 2013–2017)
- * * *
- (Uzbekistan) Jamshid Saidov (2023–)
