= Igor Shkvyrin =

Uzbekistani footballer (born 1963)

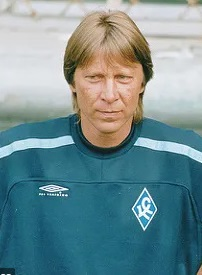

Personal information
- Full name: Igor Anatolyevich Shkvyrin
- Date of birth: 29 April 1963 (age 63)
- Place of birth: Tashkent, Uzbek SSR, Soviet Union
- Height: 1.84 m (6 ft 0 in)
- Position: Forward

Youth career
- Lokomotiv Tashkent

Senior career*
Years	Team	Apps	(Gls)
1980–1983	FK Yangiyer	79	(11)
1983–1985	Pakhtakor Tashkent	66	(13)
1986–1987	SKA-Karpaty Lviv	46	(11)
1988–1989	Dnepr Dnepropetrovsk	14	(2)
1989–1991	Pakhtakor Tashkent	67	(51)
1992	Spartak Vladikavkaz	10	(5)
1992–1993	Hapoel Tel Aviv	39	(16)
1993–1994	Maccabi Netanya	32	(13)
1995	Pahang FA	18	(15)
1995–1996	Bnei Yehuda	18	(5)
1996	Maccabi Petah Tikva	2	(0)
1996–1997	Maccabi Herzliya	21	(1)
1997–1998	Maccabi Jaffa	?	(3)
1998–1999	Pakhtakor Tashkent	43	(39)
1999–2000	Mohun Bagan	18	(11)
2000	Pakhtakor Tashkent	33	(20)
2000–2001	Churchill Brothers	20	(12)
2001	Pakhtakor Tashkent	26	(7)
Total		394	(219)

International career
1992–2000	Uzbekistan	31	(20)

Managerial career
- 2003–2004: FC Krylia Sovetov Samara (assistant)
- 2005–2007: Qizilqum Zarafshon
- 2007: Uzbekistan U23 (assistant)
- 2008–2010: Uzbekistan (assistant)
- 2008–2016: Olmaliq FK
- 2017: Sogdiana Jizzakh
- * Club domestic league appearances and goals

Igor Anatolyevich Shkvyrin (Russian: Игорь Анатольевич Шквырин; born 29 April 1963) is an Uzbekistani former professional footballer who played for several clubs in Europe and Asia and for the Uzbekistan national team. He was most recently the head coach of Sogdiana Jizzakh.

== Playing career ==
Shkvyrin was born in Tashkent. He played several seasons in the Soviet Top League with Pakhtakor Tashkent and moved to Israel where he played for Hapoel Tel Aviv and Malaysia where he played for Pahang FA. With Pahang, he won the 1995 Liga Perdana. With Pakhtakor, he scored 51 goals in 67 league matches between 1989 and 1991. He scored totally 275 goals in career and is member of Club 200 of Berador Abduraimov.

In 1999–2000 season, Shkvyrin appeared in the National Football League with Mohun Bagan, and scored 11 goals. He emerged as the top scorer in the league that season. Later he moved to another Indian outfit Churchill Brothers and played in the 2000–01 season. He scored 12 goals for the Red Machine and won the Durand Cup in 2001.

The 1994 Asian Games gold medallist Shkvyrin returned to Uzbekistan at the end of the season, and would eventually rack up five separate stints for Pakhtakor Tashkent before finally hanging up his boots at the age of 38 in 2001.

== International career ==
Shkyrin made his debut for Uzbekistan on 17 June 1992 against Tajikistan in a 2–2 draw match, where he scored his first international Goal.

He made 31 appearances for the Uzbekistan national team and scored 20 goals between 1992 and 2000. He played in the 1994 Asian Games football tournament in Hiroshima, Japan (the first time Uzbekistan national team participated in an official football tournament following its independence from the Soviet Union, and the team won the gold medal).

== Managerial career ==
In 2002, Shkvyrin began managing career and worked in 2003–04 as assistant coach to Aleksandr Tarkhanov in FC Krylia Sovetov Samara. From 2005 to 2007 he was head coach of Uzbek League club Qizilqum Zarafshon. In 2007, he was appointed as assistant coach to Vadim Abramov for Uzbekistan U-23 national team and in 2008–2010 worked as co-trainer to Rauf Inileev and later Mirjalol Kasymov for Uzbekistan national team.

Since 2008 he is head coach of Olmaliq FK. In season 2009 Olmaliq finished fourth in the league and Shkvyrin was named Football coach of the Year.

== Career statistics ==
Appearances and goals by club, season and competition
Club	Season	League		
Club	Season	Division	Apps	Goals
FK Yangiyer	1981	Soviet Second League	33	2
FK Yangiyer	1982	Soviet Second League	34	5
FK Yangiyer	1983	Soviet Second League	11	4
Pakhtakor Tashkent	1983	Soviet Top League	15	2
Pakhtakor Tashkent	1984	Soviet Top League	25	9
Pakhtakor Tashkent	1985	Soviet First League	26	2
Karpaty Lviv	1986	Soviet First League	8	0
Karpaty Lviv	1987	Soviet First League	38	11
Dnipro Dnipropetrovsk	1988	Soviet Top League	10	2
Dnipro Dnipropetrovsk	1989	Soviet Top League	4	0
Pakhtakor Tashkent	1990	Soviet First LeagueI	37	37
Pakhtakor Tashkent	1989	Soviet First LeagueI	27	6
Pakhtakor Tashkent	1991	Soviet Top League	30	14
Spartak Vladikavkaz	1992	Russian Premier League	10	5
Hapoel Tel Aviv	1992–93	Israeli Premier League	31	15
Hapoel Tel Aviv	1993–94	Israeli Premier League	21	9
Maccabi Netanya	1994–95	Israeli Premier League	21	9
Pahang FA	1995–96	Malaysia Premier League	18	15
Maccabi Petah Tikva	1996–97	Israeli Premier League	18	5
Maccabi Herzliya	1996–97	Israeli Premier League	21	1
Maccabi Jaffa	1997–98	Liga ArtzitI	?	3
Pakhtakor Tashkent	1998	Uzbek League	29	17
Pakhtakor Tashkent	1999	Uzbek League	14	22
Mohun Bagan	1999–2000	National Football League (India)	18	11
Pakhtakor Tashkent	2000	Uzbek League	33	20
Churchill Brothers	2000–01	National Football League (India)	20	12
Pakhtakor Tashkent	2001	Uzbek League	26	7

== International goals ==
No.	Date	Venue	Opponent	Score	Result	Competition
1.	17 June 1992	Dushanbe, Tajikistan	Tajikistan	1–0	2–2	1992 Central Asian Cup
2.	1 October 1994	Hiroshima, Japan	Saudi Arabia	3–0	4–1	1994 Asian Games
3.	1 October 1994	Hiroshima, Japan	Saudi Arabia	4–0	4–1	1994 Asian Games
4.	3 October 1994	Hiroshima, Japan	Malaysia	3–0	5–0	1994 Asian Games
5.	3 October 1994	Hiroshima, Japan	Malaysia	4–0	5–0	1994 Asian Games
6.	7 October 1994	Hiroshima, Japan	Thailand	5–1	5–4	1994 Asian Games
7.	11 October 1994	Miyoshi, Japan	Turkmenistan	1–0	3–0	1994 Asian Games
8.	11 October 1994	Miyoshi, Japan	Turkmenistan	3–0	3–0	1994 Asian Games
9.	16 October 1994	Hiroshima, Japan	China	1–0	4–2	1994 Asian Games
10.	19 June 1996	Tashkent, Uzbekistan	Tajikistan	4–0	5–0 (a.e.t.)	1996 AFC Asian Cup qualification
11.	6 December 1996	Al Ain, UAE	China	1–0	2–0	1996 AFC Asian Cup
12.	24 August 1997	Tashkent, Uzbekistan	Yemen	1–0	5–1	1998 FIFA World Cup qualification
13.	24 August 1997	Tashkent, Uzbekistan	Yemen	4–1	5–1	1998 FIFA World Cup qualification
14.	25 October 1997	Tashkent, Uzbekistan	Kazakhstan	1–0	4–0	1998 FIFA World Cup qualification
15.	25 October 1997	Tashkent, Uzbekistan	Kazakhstan	2–0	4–0	1998 FIFA World Cup qualification
16.	5 December 1998	Chiang Mai, Thailand	Mongolia	2–0	15–0	1998 Asian Games
17.	5 December 1998	Chiang Mai, Thailand	Mongolia	3–0	15–0	1998 Asian Games
18.	5 December 1998	Chiang Mai, Thailand	Mongolia	5–0	15–0	1998 Asian Games
19.	7 December 1998	Bangkok, Thailand	North Korea	2–0	4–0	1998 Asian Games
20.	9 December 1998	Bangkok, Thailand	India	1–0	2–0	1998 Asian Games

== Honours ==
=== As a player ===
Pahang FA

- Malaysia Super League: 1995

Pakhtakor Tashkent

- Uzbek League: 1998; runner-up 2001
- Uzbek Cup: 2001

Mohun Bagan

- National Football League (India): 1999–2000

Churchill Brothers

- Durand Cup: 2001

Uzbekistan

- Asian Games: 1994

Individual

- Soviet First League top scorer: 1990 (37 goals)
- National Football League (India) Golden Boot: 1999–2000 (11 goals)
- Uzbek League top scorer: 1998 (22 goals)
- Club 200 of Berador Abduraimov member: 275 goals
- Uzbekistan Player of the Year: 1994
- Best Player and top scorer of Asian Games 1994: 8 goals (7 matches)

=== As a manager ===
- Uzbek League 4th place: 2009
- Uzbekistan Football Coach of the Year: 2009
- UzPFL Coach of the Month: March 2015

== See also ==
- Uzbekistan Footballer of the Year
