= Yuriy Sarkisyan =

Uzbekistani football manager and former player of Armenian descent

Personal information
- Full name: Yuriy Vazgenovich Sarkisyan
- Date of birth: 30 May 1947 (age 79)
- Place of birth: Yerevan, Armenian SSR, Soviet Union
- Position: Forward

Team information
- Current team: Bunyodkor (assistant)

Senior career*
Years	Team	Apps	(Gls)
1968–1969	Metallurg Olmaliq		(14)
1970–1973	Avtomobilist Termez		(30)
1974	Spartak Termez	30	(19)
1975	Avtomobilist Termez		(14)
1976–1977	Neftyanik Fergana		(42)
1978	Shakhrikhanez		(21)
1979–1982	Neftyanik Fergana	96	(75)

Managerial career
- 1987–2013: Neftchi Farg'ona
- 1996: Uzbekistan
- 2000: Uzbekistan
- 2014–: Bunyodkor (assistant coach)
- * Club domestic league appearances and goals

Yuriy Vazgenovich Sarkisyan (Armenian: Յուրի Վազգենի Սարգսյան, Russian: Юрий Вазгенович Саркисян; born 30 May 1947) is an Uzbekistani football manager and former player of Armenian descent. He is the first Armenian to lead a national team into an international tournament.

== Playing career ==
He started his footballer career in 1968, at Metallurg from Olmaliq. From 1970 to 1973, he played for Avtomobilist Termez. His last player station was Neftyanik Fergana where he later began his managing career. In his footballer career, he completed 14 seasons and 10 times became top scorer of teams he played. With 241 goals, he is a member of Club 200 of Berador Abduraimov.

== Managing career ==
In 1987, he became manager of Neftchi Farg'ona. Since 1990, he is Merited Trainer of Uzbekistan. From 1992 to 1995, Sarkisyan won with Neftchi Farg'ona five times Uzbek League. From July 2000 to February 2000, he was coach of Uzbekistan national football team. He was named by UFF five times as Coach of the Year, more than any other uzbek coach ever.

On 16 May 2013, Sarkisyan was sacked as Neftchi coach after club's poor result in recent league matches. He worked at the club for last 26 years. Sarkisyan was named in uzbek mass media Uzbek Ferguson for long years managing work in Neftchi Farg'ona.

== Honours ==
=== Manager ===
- Soviet Second League, East conference (1): 1990
- Uzbek League (5): 1992, 1993, 1994, 1995, 2001
- Uzbek Cup (2): 1994, 1996
- Asian Club Championship 3rd: 1995

=== Individual ===
- Uzbekistan Football Coach of the Year (5): 1998, 1999, 2001, 2003, 2006
- Club 200 of Berador Abduraimov member
