= Mirjalol Qosimov =

Uzbek footballer and coach

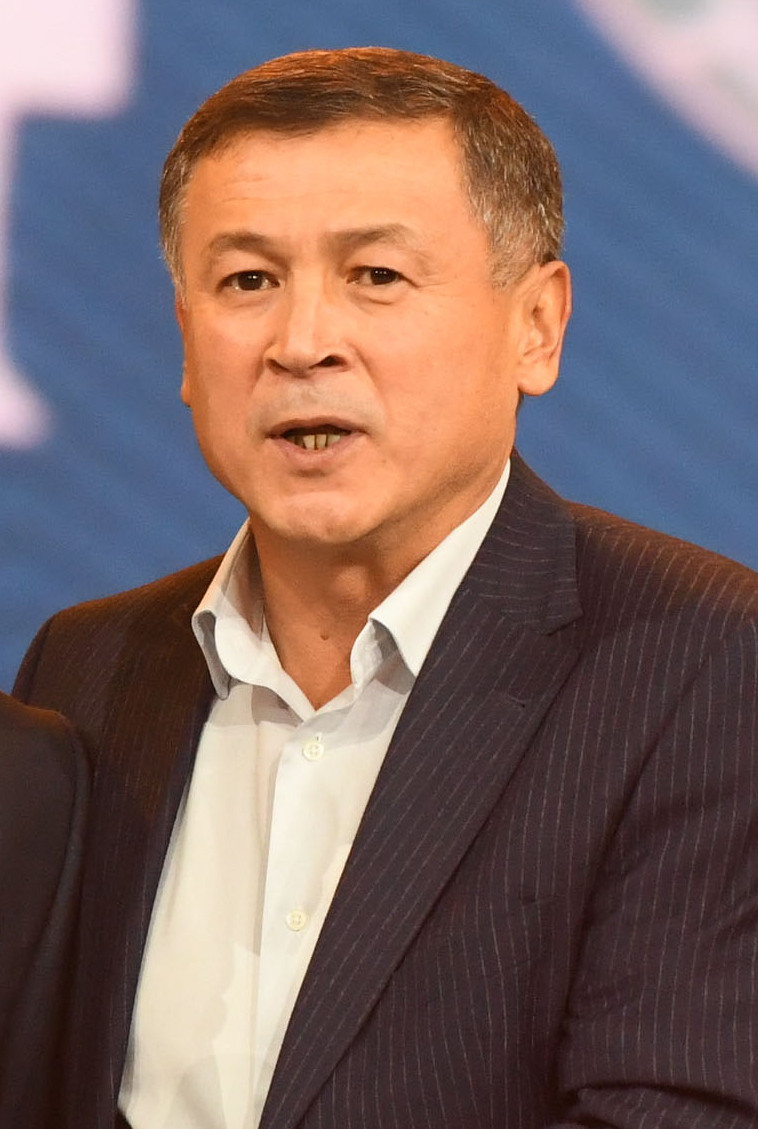
- Qosimov in 2022

Personal information
- Full name: Mirjalol Kushakovich Qosimov
- Date of birth: 17 September 1970 (age 56)
- Place of birth: Tashkent, Uzbek SSR, Soviet Union
- Height: 1.74 m (5 ft 8 1/2 in)
- Position: Midfielder

Team information
- Current team: AGMK (manager)

Youth career
- Pakhtakor Tashkent

Senior career*
Years	Team	Apps	(Gls)
1986	FShM Moscow	1	(0)
1987–1988	Pakhtakor Tashkent	22	(1)
1988	Dinamo Minsk	1	(0)
1988–1991	Pakhtakor Tashkent	96	(12)
1992	Spartak Vladikavkaz	25	(3)
1993	Pakhtakor Tashkent	21	(12)
1994–1996	Alania Vladikavkaz	64	(25)
1997–1999	Pakhtakor Tashkent	33	(28)
1999	Alania Vladikavkaz	12	(2)
2000–2001	Krylia Sovetov Samara	45	(6)
2002	Al-Shabab Dubai		(4)
2002–2003	Pakhtakor Tashkent	21	(12)
2003–2004	Alania Vladikavkaz	24	(3)
2005	Mash'al Mubarek	21	(6)

International career
1986–1987	Soviet Union U18	31	(3)
1990–1991	Soviet Union U21	3	(0)
1992–2005	Uzbekistan	67	(31)

Managerial career
- 2007–2008: Bunyodkor
- 2008–2010: Uzbekistan
- 2010–2014: Bunyodkor
- 2012–2015: Uzbekistan
- 2017–2018: Bunyodkor
- 2019–: AGMK
Medal record
Men's football
Representing Soviet Union
FIFA U-17 World Cup
Winner	1987 Canada
UEFA European Under-19 Championship
Winner	1988 Czechoslovakia
Representing Uzbekistan
Asian Games
Gold medal – first place	1994 Hiroshima
Afro-Asian Cup of Nations
Runner-up	1995 Uzbekistan-Nigeria
- * Club domestic league appearances and goals

Mirjalol Kushakovich Qosimov (Note: also transliterated Mirdjalal Kasimov or Kasymov) (Uzbek: Mirjalol Qoʻshoqovich Qosimov, Russian: Мирджалол Кушакович Касымов; born 17 September 1970) is a former head coach of the Uzbekistan national football team. He also played for the national team as a playmaker in midfield. Qosimov is currently the manager of AGMK.

== Club career ==
Qosimov finished his career in 2005 with Mash'al Mubarek, which plays in Uzbek League (Uzbek: O'zbekiston Oliy Ligasi). He played a vital role in Mash'al becoming runners-up during the 2005 Uzbek national football club championship, which was the club's best ever finish. 2005 he decided to finish his career. Kasimov previously starred for Pakhtakor Tashkent and Alania Vladikavkaz in Russia. With 210 goals in his playing career, he is a member of Club 200 of Berador Abduraimov and Gennadi Krasnitsky club. He is one of the most successful and famous players of Uzbek football of the modern period.

Qosimov was the first Uzbekistani and the second Asian player after South Korean Cha Bum-Kun to have scored in UEFA competitions, UEFA Cup. On 12 September 1995, in the 1995–96 UEFA Cup, he scored for Alania against Liverpool.

== International career ==
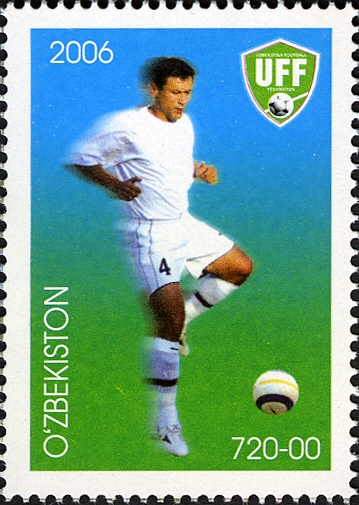
Qosimov on a postage stamp

In 1987, Qosimov got his first international experience as a member of the Soviet U-17 football team and won with the national USSR team the FIFA U-16 championship in Canada, becoming one of the rising stars of the tournament. One year later, 1988 Mirdjalol with USSR U-18 won the European U-18 Football championship title

In 1994 Uzbekistan won the Asian Games and he was selected as the best midfield player in Asia; in 1993, 1998, 2001 and 2004 he was named the best football player in Uzbekistan. Kasimov captained the Uzbek national team for a long time in the 2000s. His last international match in the national team was against the Bahrain national football team in the World Cup 2006 qualifiers in Tashkent.

He played his final match in professional football on 2 June 2007 at MHSK Stadium in Tashkent against a combined team of European and Asian stars. The match brought together famous players such as Iranian Ali Daei, his counterpart Alireza Mansurian, and ex-Qatar international Mubarak Mustapha, his former trainer from Alania, Valeri Gazzaev, Russian footballers Viktor Onopko and Andrei Karyaka. It was the last match in his bright career that lasted more than 20 years and 67 appearances in the uniform of the national team and 31 goals.

== Managing career ==
He started his trainer career as coach of Mash'al Mubarek, his last player station, where he retired as player. In 2006, he became co-trainer to Rauf Inileev of the Uzbekistan national and Uzbekistan Olympic football team. In December 2007 Kasymov was appointed as coach of Bunyodkor. In 2008, he managed to bring his club to the semi-final of the AFC Champions League in the club's first appearance in this tournament, which is considered to be the best international performance of Bunyodkor's history actually. Bunyodkor won in quarterfinal of tournament in two leg matches Saipa. On 25 September 2008 Brazilian legend, Zico was appointed as the new coach of Bunyodkor, Kasimov remained adviser-coach at club side.

On 16 September 2008, he became head coach of the Uzbekistan national football team for the qualification stage of the 2010 World cup. On 6 April 2010 he was replaced by Vadim Abramov as national team trainer. After Luiz Felipe Scolari left Bunyodkor in May 2010, Qosimov was named coach of the club again.

The authoritative football news website Goal.com named Qosimov as Best Coach of Month (May 2012) for the successful play of Bunyodkor in the AFC Champions League in that month.

On 4 June 2012, Qosimov was appointed as the new head coach of the Uzbekistan national football team for the second time after Vadim Abramov resigned from his post (lost 0–1 against Iran at home).

On 3 January 2013, IFFHS published its list of The World's best National Coach 2012 and Qosimov ranked 14th in the list among 17 coaches with 6 points, followed by Oleg Blokhin and the current coach of Switzerland, Ottmar Hitzfeld. In monthly survey Coach of the Month by Football Federation over the 2012 Kasymov was named best coach 6 times. UFF named Kasymov Coach of the Year on 21 January 2013.

Qosimov resigned his post as Bunyodkor's head coach on 5 April 2014 to concentrate on his work in the national team. He also led the U-23 national team for the 2014 Asian Games in Incheon.

On 22 December 2018 Qosimov was appointed as head coach of AGMK to prepare team for upcoming 2019 Uzbekistan Super League and qualification matches of 2019 AFC Champions League. On 12 February 2019 in 2nd preliminary round of 2019 AFC Champions League AGMK won Istiklol by 4:0. But in next play-off round one leg match on 19 February 2019 lost to Al-Nassr 0:4 und failed to qualify to group stage tournament.

== Honours ==
=== Player ===
Spartak Vladikavkaz

- Russian Premier League: Runner-up, 1992

Alania Vladikavkaz

- Russian Premier League: 1995; Runner-up, 1996

Pakhtakor Tashkent

- Uzbekistan Super League: 1998, 2002, 2003; Runner-up, 1993
- Uzbek Cup: 1993, 1997, 2002, 2003

Mash'al Mubarek

- Uzbekistan Super League: Runner-up, 2005

Soviet Union U-18

- FIFA U-17 World Cup: 1987
- UEFA U-18 Championship: 1988

Uzbekistan

- Asian Games: Gold Medalist, 1994
- Afro-Asian Cup of Nations: Runner-up, 1995

=== Individual ===
- Uzbekistan Footballer of the Year (4): 1993, 1998, 2001, 2004
- Uzbek League Topscorer: 1998 (22 goals)

=== Manager ===
Bunyodkor

- Uzbekistan Super League: 2010, 2011, 2013
- Uzbekistan Super League runner-up: 2012
- Uzbek Cup: 2010, 2012, 2013
- AFC Champions League semi-final: 2008, 2012

AGMK

- Uzbek Cup runner-up: 2019

Individual

- Uzbekistan Coach of the Year: 2012
- Uzbekistan Super League Coach of the Month: March 2025

== Statistics ==
=== Player ===
Mirjalol Qosimov as Alania Vladikavkaz player performed 3 international appearances in UEFA tournaments. In the UEFA Cup season 1995–96 Kasymov played twice in a match against FC Liverpool won by albion team with 2–1 and scored an only goal of his team. In UEFA Champions League season 1996–97 qualifying round he played in a match against Rangers F.C. on 7 August 1996 won by Rangers with 3–1.

Club	Season	League			Cup			CL and UEFA Cup			Total		
Club	Season	Apps	Goals	Assists	Apps	Goals	Assists	Apps	Goals	Assists	Apps	Goals	Assists
Alania	1992	25	3		–			–			25	3	
Alania	1994	25	4		2	1		–			27	5	
Alania	1995	22	10	11	1			2	1		25	11	11
Alania	1996	17	11	6	1	1		1	0		19	12	6
Alania	1999	11	2	1	1			–			12	2	1
Alania	Total	100	30	18	5	2		3	1		108	33	18
Krylia Sovetov	2000	23	5	3	1			–			24	5	3
Krylia Sovetov	2001	22	1	6	2	1		–			24	2	6
Krylia Sovetov	Total	45	6	9	3	1		–			48	7	9
Alania	2003	8	1	1	–			–			8	1	1
Alania	2004	16	2	5	1	1		–			17	3	5
Alania	Total	24	3	6	1	1		–			25	4	6
Career total		169	39	33	9	4		3	1		181	44	33

Statistics accurate as of match played 12 November 2004 in Russian Premier League.

=== International goals ===
Scores and results list Uzbekistan's goal tally first.

#	Date	Venue	Opponent	Result	Competition	Scored
1	1 October 1994	Hiroshima, Japan	Saudi Arabia	4-1	1994 Asian Games	1
2	3 October 1994	Hiroshima, Japan	Malaysia	5-0	1994 Asian Games	1
3, 4	7 October 1994	Onomichi, Japan	Thailand	5-4	1994 Asian Games	2
5	21 October 1995	Tashkent, Uzbekistan	Nigeria	2-3	1995 Afro-Asian Cup of Nations	1
6, 7	19 June 1996	Tashkent, Uzbekistan	Tajikistan	5-0	1996 Asian Cup qualifier	2
8	25 October 1997	Tashkent, Uzbekistan	Kazakhstan	4-0	1998 World Cup qualifier	1
9	24 April 1998	Baku, Azerbaijan	Azerbaijan	1-2	Friendly	1
10	3 December 1998	Chiangmai, Thailand	Kuwait	3-3	1998 Asian Games	1
11, 12, 13	5 December 1998	Chiangmai, Thailand	Mongolia	15-0	1998 Asian Games	3
14	11 July 1999	Samarkand, Uzbekistan	Malaysia	3-0	Friendly	1
15	21 November 1999	Al-Ain, UAE	United Arab Emirates	6-0	2000 Asian Cup qualifier	1
16	14 October 2000	Sidon, Lebanon	Qatar	1-1	2000 Asian Cup	1
17	25 April 2001	Tashkent, Uzbekistan	Turkmenistan	1-0	2002 World Cup qualifier	1
18	3 May 2001	Amman, Jordan	Turkmenistan	5-2	2002 World Cup qualifier	1
19, 20	5 May 2001	Amman, Jordan	Chinese Taipei	4-0	2002 World Cup qualifier	2
21	26 August 2001	Tashkent, Uzbekistan	Qatar	2-1	2002 World Cup qualifier	1
22, 23	8 September 2001	Tashkent, Uzbekistan	Oman	5-0	2002 World Cup qualifier	2
24	28 September 2001	Doha, Qatar	Qatar	2-2	2002 World Cup qualifier	1
25	18 July 2004	Chengdu, China	Iraq	1-0	2004 Asian Cup	1
26	26 July 2004	Chongqing, China	Turkmenistan	1-0	2004 Asian Cup	1
27	8 September 2004	Al Rayyan, Qatar	Palestine	3-0	2006 World Cup qualifier	1
28, 29, 30	17 November 2004	Tashkent, Uzbekistan	Chinese Taipei	3-0	2006 World Cup qualifier	3
31	3 September 2005	Tashkent, Uzbekistan	Bahrain	1-0	Friendly	1 (Note: This match was annulled by FIFA as a World Cup Qualifier (and later replayed) but counts as a friendly for the Uzbek FA.)
