= Edgar Gess =

Tajikistani-German football coach & former Soviet player (born 1954)

Personal information
- Full name: Edgar Yakovlevich Gess
- Date of birth: 14 March 1954 (age 72)
- Place of birth: Taboshary, Tajik SSR, Soviet Union
- Height: 1.74 m (5 ft 9 in)
- Positions: Midfielder; striker

Youth career
- 1969–1971: Kuroma Taboshary

Senior career*
Years	Team	Apps	(Gls)
1972–1979	Pamir Dushanbe	198	(44)
1979–1983	Spartak Moscow	114	(26)
1984–1986	Pakhtakor	93	(15)

International career
1979	USSR	1	(0)

Managerial career
- 1986: Pakhtakor (assistant)
- 1987–1988: Zarafshan Navoi
- 1988–1991: FC Mittelbiberach
- 1991–1995: Wacker Biberach
- 1995: FC Mittelbiberach
- 1997–1999: FV Biberach
- 1999–2003: Türkspor Biberach
- 2004: Almaty
- 2005: Alania Vladikavkaz (assistant)
- 2005: Alania Vladikavkaz
- 2006: Vėtra
- 2006–2007: Andijan
- 2008: Nasaf
- 2009–2011: Shurtan Guzar
- 2012–2013: Shurtan Guzar
- 2013–2014: FK Buxoro
- 2014–2015: Andijan
- * Club domestic league appearances and goals

Edgar Yakovlevich Gess (Russian: Эдгар Яковлевич Гесс; German: Edgar Hess; born 14 March 1954) is a Tajikistani-German football coach and a former Soviet player.

== International career ==
Gess played his only game for the USSR on 5 September 1979 in a friendly game against East Germany.

== Coaching career ==
On 18 April 2005, Gess was appointed as the Head Coach of Alania Vladikavkaz following the departure of Bakhva Tedeyev.

In 2009–2011 he was head coach of an Uzbek club Shurtan Guzar. During this time Shurtan Guzar finished 4th in the 2010 season and the team reached the Uzbek Cup final, losing 0–1 to Bunyodkor. On 30 June 2011 he was sacked as a result of the previous losses and Tachmurad Agamuradov was named as the new coach of Shurtan. In July 2012 Gess was appointed as head coach of Shurtan again, after Igor Kriushenko was sacked as well due to a losing record. On 15 May 2013 he was sacked again and left the club permanently. On 10 November 2013 FK Buxoro announced that they had hired Gess as their new manager, replacing Tachmurad Agamuradov in this position.

== Personal life ==
He is a Russian German whose parents were forcefully resettled in Soviet Central Asia during the World War II. Gess emigrated in 1989 to Ulm in Swabia, Germany.

== Honours ==
=== Player ===
- Soviet Top League winner: 1979.

=== Manager ===
- Uzbek League 4th: 2010
- Uzbek Cup runners-up: 2010
