= Vadim Abramov =

Uzbekistani footballer (born 1953)

Vadim Karlenovich Abramov
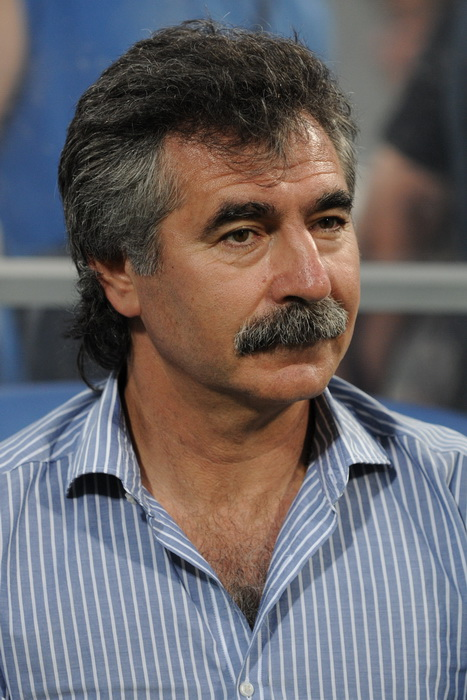

Personal information
- Full name: Vadim Karlenovich Abramov
- Date of birth: 6 February 1953 (age 73)
- Place of birth: Baku, Azerbaijan, Soviet Union
- Position: Midfielder

Senior career*
Years	Team	Apps	(Gls)
1979–1980	Tavriya Simferopol		
1980–1981	Atlantika		
1984–1985	Narimanovets Bog‘ot		
1985–1987	Sogdiana Jizzakh		
1987–1988	Sohibkor Khalqobod		

Managerial career
- 1988–1991: Pakhtakor
- 1991–1996: Neftchi Fergana (caretaker)
- 2000–2001: NBU Osiyo
- 2003–2007: Traktor Tashkent
- 2007–2007: Uzbekistan U-23
- 2008–2010: Lokomotiv Tashkent
- 2010–2012: Uzbekistan
- 2013–2013: Astana
- 2014–2015: Lokomotiv Tashkent
- 2017–2017: Neftchi Fergana
- 2019–2020: Bunyodkor
- 2019–2021: Uzbekistan
- 2022–: Dynamo Samarkand
- * Club domestic league appearances and goals

Vadim Karlenovich Abramov (Armenian: Վադիմ Աբրամով; Russian: Вадим Абрамов) is an Uzbekistani football manager and former player. He served as the Uzbekistan national team's head coach from 2010 to 2012.

== Early life ==
Abramov was born in 1953 in Baku, Azerbaijan.

== Managerial career ==
From 2003 to 2005 Abramov worked as head coach of Traktor Tashkent. The club reached the finals of Uzbek Cup in 2004 and a year later ranked at 4th place in the League. In 2006, he became coach of Lokomotiv Tashkent. The club finished the 2009 season at 6th place.

On 6 April 2010, Abramov was appointed as head coach of the Uzbekistan national team, replacing Mirjalol Kasymov.

He was the coach of the Uzbekistan national team at the 2011 AFC Asian Cup. In their first game of the 2011 Asian Cup they defeated Qatar 2–0. They went on to reach the quarter finals where they faced Jordan. After beating Jordan 2–1, Uzbekistan qualified for the semi finals where they lost to Australia. They eventually finished in fourth place after losing to South Korea in the third place playoff.

On 4 June 2012, after a 1–0 loss to Iran at home during 2014 FIFA World Cup qualification, Abramov resigned from his job.

On 28 November 2013, Abramov was named new head coach of Astana. Two weeks later agreement with club was canceled.

On 13 February 2014, he was appointed new head coach of Lokomotiv Tashkent after his predecessor Khakim Fuzaylov was fired from his post. Abramov moved back to his former club after serving at Lokomotiv from 2008 to 2010. He worked at Lokomotiv more than year. Lokomotiv led by Abramov won the Uzbek Cup in 2014 and the club finished again runner-up. On 8 March 2015, Lokomotiv won the Uzbekistan Super Cup, beating current champion Pakhtakor by 4–0. On 17 October 2015, he was fired from his post after several unsatisfactory results in league matches.

On 24 September 2019, Abramov was named manager of the Uzbekistan national team for a second time.

== Personal life ==
His son was Armenia U-17 and Navbahor Namangan football player, Karlen Abramov. He died in a car accident, at just 21 years old.

== Managerial statistics ==
As of match played 15 June 2021

Managerial record by team and tenure
Team	From	To	Record					Ref.
Team	From	To	P	W	D	L	Win %	Ref.
Traktor Tashkent	2 December 2005	1 January 2007	34	17	4	13	50.0	
PFC Lokomotiv Tashkent	22 January 2009	9 November 2009	31	12	10	9	38.7	
Uzbekistan	7 April 2010	4 June 2012	28	11	6	11	39.3	
Uzbekistan U23	1 February 2011	1 April 2012	14	6	5	3	42.9	
FC Astana	28 November 2013	13 December 2013	0	0	0	0	—	
PFC Lokomotiv Tashkent	13 February 2014	19 October 2015	33	19	7	7	57.6	
FC Neftchi Fergana	1 July 2017	31 December 2017	15	4	4	7	26.7	
FC Bunyodkor	1 January 2019	31 December 2020	55	25	15	15	45.5	
Uzbekistan	23 September 2019	""Present""	15	8	0	7	53.3	
Total			225	102	51	72	45.3	—

== Honours ==
=== Manager ===
Traktor

- Uzbek Cup runner-up: 2004

Uzbekistan

- AFC Asian Cup 4th place: 2011

Lokomotiv

- Uzbek League runners-up (1): 2014
- Uzbek Cup (1): 2014
- Uzbekistan Super Cup (1): 2015

=== Individual ===
- Uzbekistan Football Coach of the Year: 2011
