= Anatoliy Demyanenko =

Ukrainian football player and coach

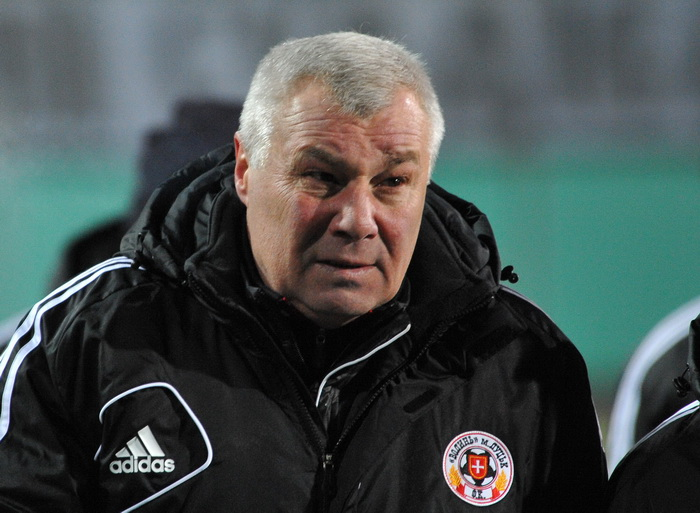
- Demyanenko with Volyn Lutsk in 2013

Personal information
- Full name: Anatoliy Vasylyovich Demyanenko
- Date of birth: 19 February 1959 (age 67)
- Place of birth: Dnipropetrovsk, Ukrainian SSR, Soviet Union
- Height: 1.80 m (5 ft 11 in)
- Positions: Left-back; left winger

Youth career
- 1971–1977: Dnipro-75 Dnipropetrovsk

Senior career*
Years	Team	Apps	(Gls)
1978–1979	Dnipro Dnipropetrovsk	20	(1)
1979–1991	Dynamo Kyiv	333	(28)
1991	1. FC Magdeburg	3	(0)
1991–1992	Widzew Łódź	13	(0)
1992–1993	Dynamo Kyiv	14	(1)
Total		383	(30)

International career
1981–1990	USSR	80	(6)

Managerial career
- 1993: CSK ZSU Kyiv
- 1993: Borysfen Boryspil (coach)
- 1993–2005: Dynamo Kyiv (coach)
- 2005–2007: Dynamo Kyiv
- 2008: Neftchi Baku
- 2010–2012: Nasaf Qarshi
- 2012–2013: Volyn Lutsk
- 2020: Nitra
Medal record
Men's football
Representing Soviet Union
UEFA European Under-21 Championship
Winner	1980 Europe
- * Club domestic league appearances and goals

Anatoliy Vasilyovych Demyanenko (Ukrainian: Анатолiй Васильович Дем'яненко, born 19 February 1959), sometimes referred to as Anatoli Demianenko, is a Ukrainian football coach and former player. As a player, he was deployed at left-back and notably represented Dynamo Kyiv and the USSR national team.

== Playing career ==
Demyanenko began his football career as a student of the Dnipro-75 football school in his home city of Dnipropetrovsk. He was added to the squad of the local Dnipro Dnipropetrovsk of the Soviet Top League in the 1975 season. However, he debuted for the main team of Dnipro in the 1978 season. By the end of that season he had played 20 games and scored 1 goal.

In 1979 Romensky played couple of games for Ukraine at the Spartakiad of the Peoples of the USSR.

Demyanenko was a longtime Dynamo Kyiv captain and a prolific left-footed player for the Soviet Union who could patrol the entire flank from defence to offence. In December 2000 he was voted the 3rd best player in the Ukrainian 'Team of the Century' according to a poll by The Ukrainsky Futbol weekly, behind Andrei Shevchenko and Oleg Blokhin. Demyanenko is fourth in the all time caps records for the USSR and played in three World Cups for them.

== Coaching career ==
Demyanenko started out his coaching career with FC CSKA Kyiv in 1993. After the Army men merged with FC Boryspil became a member of the coaching staff newly formed FC CSKA-Borysfen Kyiv. Already next season Demyanenko joined Dynamo Kyiv in 1994. Until 2005 he was a regular coach of the Dynamo's big coaching staff then he was offered to become the manager. During this time he won the Ukrainian Premier League once in 2006–07. He also won the Ukrainian Cups 2005–06, and 2006–07. Following several defeats of Dynamo Kyiv early on in the 2007–08 season, Demyanenko resigned coaching Dynamo in September 2007.

In January 2008, Demyanenko became the coach of Neftchi Baku in Azerbaijan, following the sacking of their coach Vlastimil Petržela. Demyanenko made history in Azerbaijan, making Neftchi become the first club that managed to get to the third round of UEFA Cup Qualification. However, he was sacked after the Azerbaijan Premier League started and he lost the first two games.

== Personal life ==
Anatoliy is a father of a Ukrainian football midfielder Denys Demyanenko (born 2000), who began his career in Desna Chernihiv.

== Career statistics ==
=== Club ===
Appearances and goals by club, season and competition
Club	Season	League		Cup		Europe		Super Cup		Total	
Club	Season	Apps	Goals	Apps	Goals	Apps	Goals	Apps	Goals	Apps	Goals
Dnipro	1978	20	1	0	0	0	0	0	0	20	1
Dynamo Kyiv	1979	32	0	3	0	6	2	0	0	41	2
Dynamo Kyiv	1980	32	2	8	0	2	0	0	0	42	2
Dynamo Kyiv	1981	29	2	4	0	5	0	1	0	39	2
Dynamo Kyiv	1982	32	5	3	0	4	1	0	0	39	6
Dynamo Kyiv	1983	33	3	1	0	2	0	0	0	36	3
Dynamo Kyiv	1984	33	2	7	0	0	0	0	0	40	2
Dynamo Kyiv	1985	34	8	2	1	9	2	0	0	45	11
Dynamo Kyiv	1986	29	2	5	0	9	0	1	0	44	2
Dynamo Kyiv	1987	29	1	4	2	1	0	1	0	35	3
Dynamo Kyiv	1988	30	1	4	0	0	0	0	0	34	1
Dynamo Kyiv	1989	5	2	2	0	0	0	0	0	7	2
Dynamo Kyiv	1990	15	0	1	0	1	0	0	0	17	0
Dynamo Kyiv	Total	333	28	44	3	39	5	3	0	419	36
1. FC Magdeburg	1990–91	3	0	0	0	0	0	0	0	3	0
Widzew Łódź	1991–92	13	0	0	0	0	0	0	0	13	0
Dynamo Kyiv	1992–93	14	1	2	0	4	0	0	0	20	1
Career total		383	30	46	3	43	5	3	0	475	38

- The statistics in USSR Cups and Europe is made under the scheme "autumn-spring" and enlisted in a year of start of tournaments

=== International ===
Appearances and goals by national team and year
National team	Year	Apps	Goals
Soviet Union	1981	4	1
Soviet Union	1982	10	0
Soviet Union	1983	9	2
Soviet Union	1984	4	0
Soviet Union	1985	14	2
Soviet Union	1986	12	0
Soviet Union	1987	7	0
Soviet Union	1988	16	1
Soviet Union	1989	2	0
Soviet Union	1990	2	0
Total		80	6

Scores and results list the Soviet Union's goal tally first, score column indicates score after each Demyanenko goal.

List of international goals scored by Anatoliy Demyanenko
No.	Date	Venue	Opponent	Score	Result	Competition
1	23 September 1981	Central Lenin Stadium, Moscow, Soviet Union	Turkey	2–0	4–0	1982 FIFA World Cup qualification
2	27 April 1983	Central Lenin Stadium, Moscow, Soviet Union	Portugal	3–0	5–0	UEFA Euro 1984 qualifying
3	9 October 1983	Central Lenin Stadium, Moscow, Soviet Union	Poland	1–0	2–0	UEFA Euro 1984 qualifying
4	27 March 1985	Tbilisi, Soviet Union	Austria	1–0	2–0	Friendly
5	17 April 1985	Wankdorf Stadium, Bern, Switzerland	Switzerland	2–1	2–2	1986 FIFA World Cup qualification
6	21 November 1988	Damascus, Syria	Syria	1–0	2–0	Friendly

== Honours ==
=== Player ===
Club

- USSR Championship: 1980, 1981, 1985, 1986, 1990
- USSR Cup: 1982, 1985, 1987, 1990
- USSR Super Cup: 1980, 1985, 1986
- UEFA Cup Winners Cup: 1986
- Trofeo Santiago Bernabéu: 1986
- Ukrainian Championship: 1993
- Ukrainian Cup: 1993

Individual

- The best 33 football players of the Soviet Union (9): No. 1 (1981-1986, 1988); No. 2 (1980); No. 3 (1979)
- UEFA European Under-21 Football Championship Golden Player: 1980
- Ukrainian Footballer of the Year: 1982, 1985
- Soviet Footballer of the Year: 1985

=== Manager ===
Dynamo Kyiv

- Ukrainian Premier League: 2006–07
- Ukrainian Cup: 2005–06, 2006–07

Nasaf Qarshi

- AFC Cup: 2011
- Uzbek League runner-up: 2011
- Uzbek Cup runner-up: 2011
