= Ravshan Khaydarov =

Uzbekistani footballer

Ravshan Khaydarov Равшан Хайдаров
Personal information
- Date of birth: 15 July 1961 (age 65)
- Place of birth: Tashkent, Soviet Union
- Position: Defender

Team information
- Current team: Uzbekistan U-20 (manager)

Senior career*
Years	Team	Apps	(Gls)
1984–1985	FK Khiva		
1986–1987	Tselinnik		
1988	FK Khonqa Khorazm		
1989	Jaykhun Nukus		
1990–1996	Traktor Tashkent		

Managerial career
- 1997–2001: Traktor Tashkent
- 2002: Pakhtakor Tashkent
- 2002–2005: Uzbekistan
- 2006–2007: Pakhtakor Tashkent
- 2007–2010: Pakhtakor Tashkent (assistant)
- 2010–2011: Pakhtakor Tashkent
- 2012–2013: Qizilqum Zarafshon
- 2013–2014: FK Dinamo Samarqand
- 2014–2015: Uzbekistan U-19 and U-20
- 2017: Pakhtakor Tashkent
- 2017–2018: Uzbekistan U-23
Medal record
Men's football
Representing Uzbekistan (as manager)
AFC U-23 Championship
Winner	2018
AFC U-20 Asian Cup
Winner	2023
- * Club domestic league appearances and goals

Ravshan Khaydarov (born 15 July 1961) is a football manager and former player. He is currently head coach of Uzbekistan U-20.

== Playing career ==
Khaydarov started his professional career at FK Khiva in 1984, in club he spent two seasons. Next two years he played at Tselinnik. His last station as player was Traktor Tashkent.

== Managing career ==
He started his managing career at Traktor Tashkent first as assistant coach, later he became main coach of the club.

Before he was appointed as head coach of Uzbekistan on 3 January 2002, Khaydarov was assistant coach to Uzbekistan national team coach Vladimir Salkov.

In 2002 after first season half Khaydarov was acting head coach of Pakhtakor, replacing Tachmurad Agamuradov.

After Hans-Jürgen Gede was sacked, he became an acting head coach of national team. On 25 July 2005, Khaydarov left his temporary position of trainer and replaced by Bobby Houghton

In October 2008, Khaydarov resigned his position of Pakhtakor head coach, after his club lost Metallurg Bekabad with 1:2, widening gap between Kuruvchi. After Miodrag Radulović left the club and moved to Russian club FC Dynamo Moscow on 4 May 2010, Ravshan Khaydarov became trainer of Pakhtakor again. On 28 September 2011, Khaydarov was sacked and Murod Ismailov replaced him as temporary caretaker of the club.

In January 2012 Khaydarov was appointed head coach of Qizilqum Zarafshon for 2012 season. On 1 April 2013, he resigned his position as Qizilqum's head coach. The club lost all 4 starting matches of 2013 season. On 6 May 2013 he was appointed as caretaker manager of FK Dinamo Samarqand after Kamo Gazarov was sacked.

On 24 June 2014 UFF appointed Khaydarov as new head coach of Uzbekistan U-19 to prepare team for 2014 AFC U-19 Championship in Myanmar. Khaydarov resigned his post at FK Dinamo Samarqand because of new appointment. In 2014 AFC U-19 Championship Uzbekistan-U19 with Khaydarov reached semi-final of tournament, losing in semi-final to Northe Korea 0-5. Team secured qualification to 2015 FIFA U-20 World Cup in New Zealand. In 2015 U-20 World Cup Uzbekistan-U20 team reached quarter-final and lost to Senegal by 0-1. U-20 team repeated its achievement of 2013 FIFA U-20 World Cup.

On 30 April 2017 Khaydarov was appointed as new head coach of Uzbekistan U-22 to prepare team for upcoming qualification matches of 2018 AFC U-23 Championship in China. Shortly before he was assigned as head coach of Pakhtakor appointed on 6 April 2017. In 2018 AFC U-23 Championship in China Uzbekistan U-23 under Khaydarov's leading became champions for the first time in team's history, beating on 27 January 2018 in final Vietnam U-23 team by 2–1. His success named him as candidate for manager of senior side, which is preparing for the 2019 AFC Asian Cup. However, in the end, Héctor Cúper was assigned instead of Ravshan.

== Honours ==
=== Manager ===
Pakhtakor

- Uzbek League (2): 2006, 2007
- Uzbek Cup (2): 2006, 2007

Uzbekistan U-23

- AFC U-23 Championship (1): 2018

Uzbekistan U-20

- AFC U-20 Asian Cup (1): 2023

=== Individual ===
- Uzbekistan Football Coach of the Year: 2018, 2023
- Uzbekistan Football Coach of the Year 2nd (2): 2005, 2007
