= Täçmyrat Agamyradow =

Turkmen football manager (born 1952)

Personal information
- Full name: Tachmurad Shamakovich Agamuradov
- Date of birth: 18 August 1952 (age 74)
- Place of birth: Ashgabat, Soviet Union

Managerial career
- Years: Team
- 1990–1993: Nebitchi Balkanabat
- 1994–1995: Nisa Aşgabat
- 1994: Turkmenistan
- 1996–1998: Köpetdag Aşgabat
- 2000–2001: Köpetdag Aşgabat
- 2001–2005: Pakhtakor Tashkent
- 2002–2004: Uzbekistan (assistant)
- 2005–2006: Kairat
- 2007–: Dinamo Samarqand
- 2010: Lokomotiv Tashkent
- 2011: Shurtan Guzar
- 2011: Pakhtakor Tashkent (assistant)
- 2012–2013: FK Buxoro
- 2014–2015: Dinamo Samarqand
- 2015–: FK Buxoro (consultant coach)
- Dinamo Samarqand
- 2020–: FC Qizilqum Zarafshon

Tachmurad Shamakovich Agamuradov (Turkmen: Täçmyrat Şamakowiç Agamyradow, Russian: Тачмурад Шамакович Агамурадов; born 18 August 1952) is a Turkmen football manager. He was the last head coach of Uzbek club FC Qizilqum Zarafshon.

== Managing career ==
He started his managing career at sport internat of Turkmenistan Sport Committee in 1982, until 1990. After that he trained Nebitchi Balkanabat from 1990 to 1993. He was coach of Turkmenistan in football tournament of 1994 Asian Games in Hiroshima.

In 2001–2005 he was head coach of Pakhtakor Tashkent and 2004 was named as Coach of the Year.

On September 28, 2011, after Ravshan Khaydarov was sacked and Murod Ismailov replaced him as temporary caretaker of the club, Agamuradov became assistant coach to Ismailov, returning to the club.

In June 2012 Agamuradov was appointed as head coach of FK Buxoro, replacing Jamshid Saidov. On 10 November 2013 he left his position in FK Buxoro. In 2014, he was named as trainer of Dinamo Samarqand. On 2 July 2015 he announced that he is resigning his post at Dinamo. After leaving Dinamo, on 10 July 2015 he started working as consultant coach at FK Buxoro.

== Managerial honours ==
=== Club ===
Nebitchi Balkanabat

- Ýokary Liga runner-up: 1992
- Ýokary Liga 3rd: 1993
- Turkmenistan Cup runner-up: 1992

Nisa Aşgabat

- Ýokary Liga runner-up: 1995, 1995

Köpetdag Aşgabat

- Ýokary Liga (2): 1998, 2000
- Turkmenistan Cup (2): 1996/97, 2000
- CIS Cup semifinal: 1997, 1998, 2001
- Asian Cup Winners' Cup semifinal: 1997–98

Pakhtakor

- Uzbek League (5): 2002, 2002, 2003, 2004, 2005
- Uzbek Cup (3): 2001/02, 2002/03 и 2004
- AFC Champions League semifinal: 2002–03, 2004
- CIS Cup semifinal: 2003

=== National team ===
Turkmenistan

- Asian Games quarter-final: 1994, 1998

=== Individual ===
- Uzbekistan Football Coach of the Year: 2004

== Personal life ==
Täçmyrat Agamyradow's son Ahmet is also a Turkmen coach.
