= 2017 Uzbekistan Cup final =

- Event: 2017 Uzbekistan Cup
Lokomotiv	Bunyodkor
1	0
- Report
- Date: December 4, 2017; 7 years ago
- Venue: Bunyodkor, Tashkent
- Referee: Mohammed Abdulla Hassan Mohamed (United Arab Emirates)
- Attendance: 10.711
- Weather: Sunny

The 2017 Uzbekistan Cup final (in Uzbek: Futbol boʻyicha 2017-yilgi Oʻzbekiston Kubogi finali) was the 25th final match of Uzbekistan Cup. The final match was held on December 4, 2017, at the Bunyodkor Stadium between Lokomotiv Tashkent and Bunyodkor Tashkent. Lokomotiv became the champion for the third time in its history.

== Squads ==
"Lokomotiv": Ignatiy Nesterov, Kaxa Maxaradze, Ikrom Aliboyev, Marat Bikmayev (Muhammad Kone, 89) Sadriddin Abdullayev, Sardor Mirzayev, Timur Kapadze (Sanjar Shoahmedov, 61), Islom Toʻxtaxoʻjayev, Shuhrat Muhammadiyev, Oleg Zoteyev, Jaloliddin Masharipov (Diyorjon Turopov, 76).

"Bunyodkor": Murodjon Zuhurov, Rustam Ashurmatov, Akramjon Komilov, Anvar Gʻofurov, Jovlon Ibrohimov, Dostonbek Hamdamov, Dilshodbek Ahmadaliyev, Shohrux Gadoyev (Vohid Shodiyev, 78), Otabek Shukurov, Mirjamol Qosimov (Shahzodbek Nurmatov, 63), Shohruz Norxonov (Vadim Chemirtan, 59).

== Match ==
4-dekabr 2017-yil Final	Lokomotiv	1–0	Bunyodkor	Tashkent
(UTC+6)	Bikmayev 7'	Report		Stadium: Bunyodkor; Referee: Mohammed Abdulla Hassan Mohamed
