= 2012 Uzbekistan Cup final =

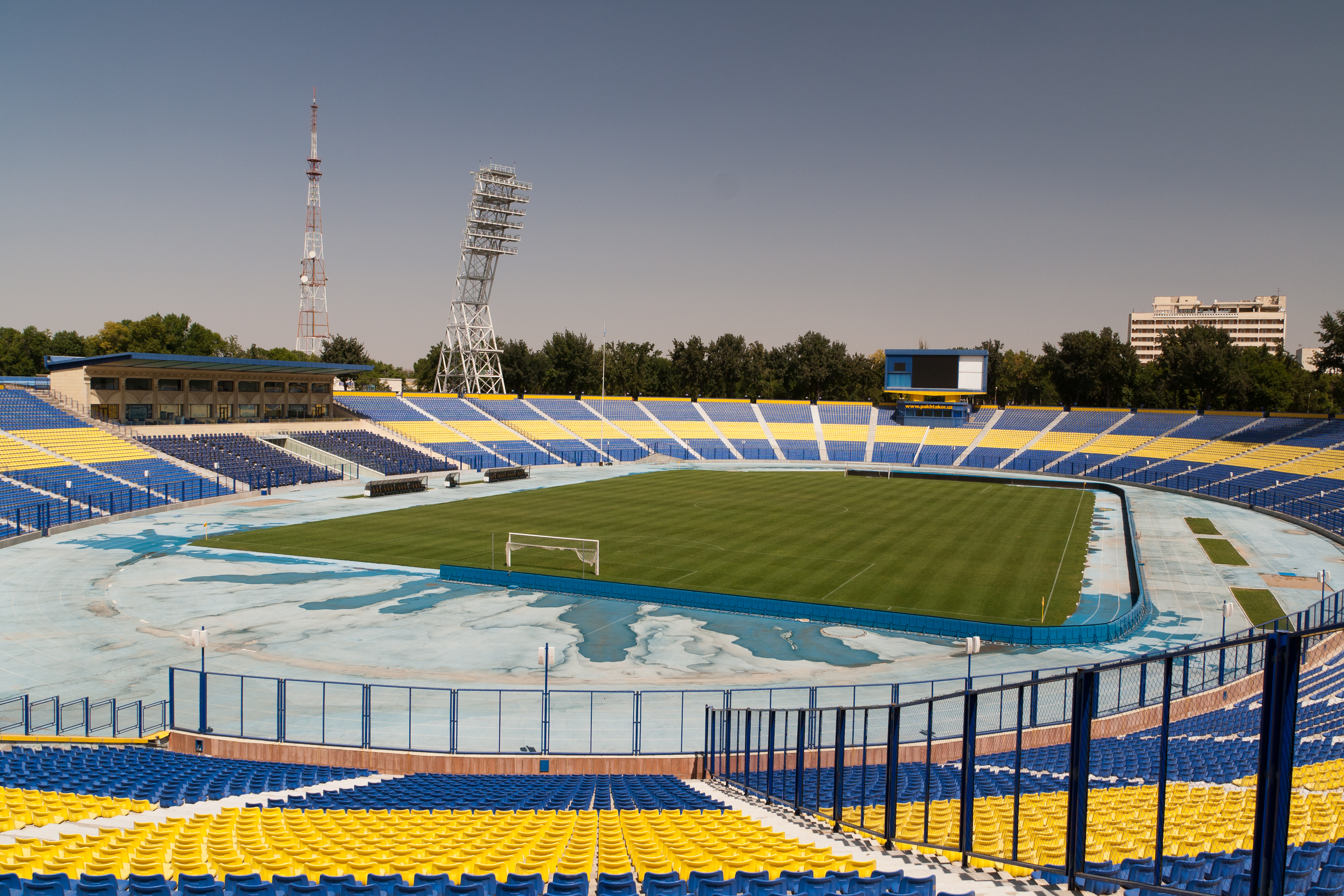
- Event: 2012 Uzbekistan Cup
FC Bunyodkor	Nasaf Qarshi
3	0
- Date: 30 November 2012
- Venue: Pakhtakor Markaziy Stadium, Tashkent
- Referee: Ravshan Irmatov
- Attendance: 7,000
- Weather: 6 °C (43 °F)

The 2012 Uzbekistan Cup final was the final match of the 2012 Uzbekistan Cup, the 20th season of the Uzbek Cup, a football competition for the 37 teams in the Uzbek League and Uzbekistan First League. The match was contested by Bunyodkor and Nasaf Qarshi, at Pakhtakor Markaziy Stadium in Tashkent, on 30 November 2012.

== Road to the final ==
Bunyodkor		Round	Nasaf Qarshi
Opponent	Result	2012 Uzbekistan Cup	Opponent	Result
FK Khiva	5–0	Round of 32	NBU Osiyo	3–0
Shurtan Guzar	2–0, 1–0	Round of 16	FK Guliston	6–0, 2–1
Mash'al Mubarek	3–0, 0–0	Quarterfinals	Metallurg Bekabad	1–2, 4–2
Pakhtakor	1–1, 3–1	Semifinals	FK Buxoro	2–0, 3–3

== Match ==
30 November 2012
15:00 UTC+05:00

Bunyodkor	3–0	Nasaf Qarshi
Salomov 8'; Murzoev 34'; Karpenko 80'	Report

Pakhtakor Markaziy Stadium, Tashkent
Attendance: 7,000
Referee: Ravshan Irmatov

Bunyodkor	Nasaf

Bunyodkor:
GK	1	(Uzbekistan) Ignatiy Nesterov
DF	2	(Uzbekistan) Akmal Shorakhmedov
DF	4	(Uzbekistan) Hayrulla Karimov
DF	6	(Uzbekistan) Anvar Gafurov
DF	16	(Uzbekistan) Artyom Filiposyan	(yellow card) 13'
MF	8	(Uzbekistan) Jovlon Ibrokhimov		(substituted off) 69'
MF	10	(Uzbekistan) Shavkat Salomov
MF	13	(Uzbekistan) Lutfulla Turaev	(yellow card) 25'
MF	19	(Uzbekistan) Jasur Hasanov
MF	22	(Uzbekistan) Viktor Karpenko(c)		(substituted off) 71'
FW	17	(Uzbekistan) Kamoliddin Murzoev		(substituted off) 77'
Substitutes:
GK	45	(Uzbekistan) Akbar Turaev
DF	5	(Uzbekistan) Dilshod Juraev	(yellow card) 88'	(substituted on) 69'
MF	14	(Uzbekistan) Alibobo Rakhmatullaev		(substituted on) 71'
MF	28	(Uzbekistan) Ruslan Melziddinov
MF	33	(Slovakia) Ján Kozák
FW	20	(Uzbekistan) Anvarjon Soliev		(substituted on) 77'
FW	24	(Uzbekistan) Bahodir Pardaev
Manager:
(Uzbekistan) Mirjalol Qosimov

Nasaf Qarshi:
GK	42	(Uzbekistan) Murod Zukhurov
DF	3	(Uzbekistan) Shavkat Raimqulov		(substituted off) 46'
DF	4	(Uzbekistan) Maksud Karimov
DF	5	(Uzbekistan) Botir Karaev
MF	17	(Turkmenistan) Artur Gevorkyan
MF	18	(Uzbekistan) Fozil Musaev	(yellow card) 19'
MF	22	(Uzbekistan) Shohruh Gadoev
MF	23	(Uzbekistan) Mirzakamol Kamalov		(substituted off) 58'
MF	27	(Uzbekistan) Ilhom Yunusov	(yellow card) 48'
FW	9	(Montenegro) Ivan Bošković		(substituted off) 79'
FW	10	(Uzbekistan) Kenja Turaev
Substitutions:
GK	30	(Uzbekistan) Gayratjon Hasanov
DF	25	(Serbia) Aleksandar Petrović		(substituted on) 46'
MF	21	(Uzbekistan) Sukhrob Nematov
MF	28	(Uzbekistan) Ildar Baymatov
MF		(Uzbekistan) Farruh Sayfiev		(substituted on) 58'
FW	8	(Latvia) Andrejs Perepļotkins
FW		(Uzbekistan) Sanjar Baratov		(substituted on) 79'
Manager:
(Uzbekistan) Ruziqul Berdiev

Man of the Match:
Assistant referees:
M. Saidqosimov
Jakhongir Saidov
Fourth official:
V.Shtern
