= 2008 Uzbekistan Cup final =

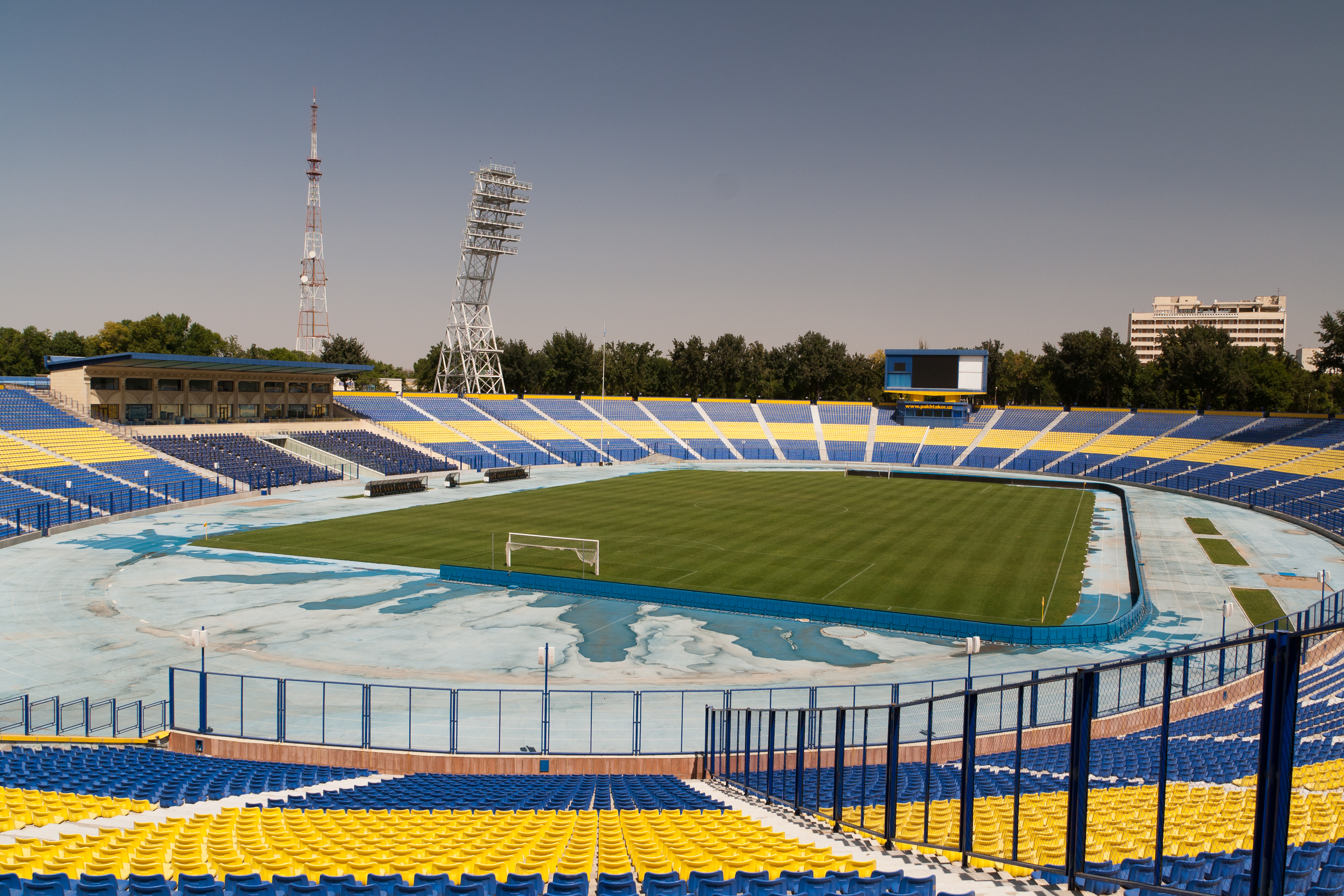
- Event: 2008 Uzbekistan Cup
Bunyodkor	Pakhtakor
3	1
- Date: October 10, 2008; 17 years ago
- Venue: Pakhtakor, Toshkent
- Referee: Marat Ismailov
- Attendance: 12.124

2008 Uzbekistan Cup final (in Uzbek: Futbol boʻyicha 2008-yilgi Oʻzbekiston Kubogi finali) was the decisive match of the 2008 Uzbekistan Cup tournament, held on 10 October 2008 at the Pakhtakor Central Stadium in Tashkent. The final was contested between Bunyodkor and Pakhtakor. In this match, Bunyodkor won the Uzbekistan Cup for the first time in its history, and with this victory, earned the right to participate in the 2009 AFC Champions League.

== Final ==
31 October 2008. Tashkent. Pakhtakor Central Stadium. 12,124 spectators. Referee: Marat Ismoilov (Tashkent).
Bunyodkor (Tashkent)*		3:1	Pakhtakor (Tashkent)
Jasur Hasanov 40'		Goal	Odil Ahmedov 45'
Anvarjon Soliev 101'		Goal
Anvarjon Soliev 114'		Goal
Starting line-ups:
Pavel Bugalo				Ignatiy Nesterov
Gocguly Gocgulyyev				Islom Inomov
Luizão	(yellow card) 30' (substituted off) 115'			Asror Aliqulov
Aleksandr Khvostunov			(yellow card) 94'	Anzur Ismailov
Jasur Hasanov	40' (substituted off) 79'		(yellow card) 108'	Ilhom Suyunov
Sakhob Juraev			45'	Odil Ahmedov
Azizbek Haydarov	(yellow card) 119'			Darko Marković
Timur Kapadze			(substituted off) 85'	Ildar Magdeev
Rivaldo			(substituted off) 89'	Alexander Geynrikh
Server Jeparov			(substituted off) 67'	Andrey Akopyants
Ulugbek Bakayev	(substituted off) 88'		(yellow card) 30'	Zayniddin Tojiev
Substitutes:
Shavkat Salomov	(substituted on) 79'		(substituted on) 67'	Fábio Pinto
Anvarjon Soliev	(substituted on) 88' (goal) 101' 114'		(substituted on) 85'	Vladislav Kiryan
Hayrulla Karimov	(substituted on) 115'		(substituted on) 89'	Stanislav Andreev
Head coach:
Zico				Viktor Djalilov
