= Uzbekistan Cup =

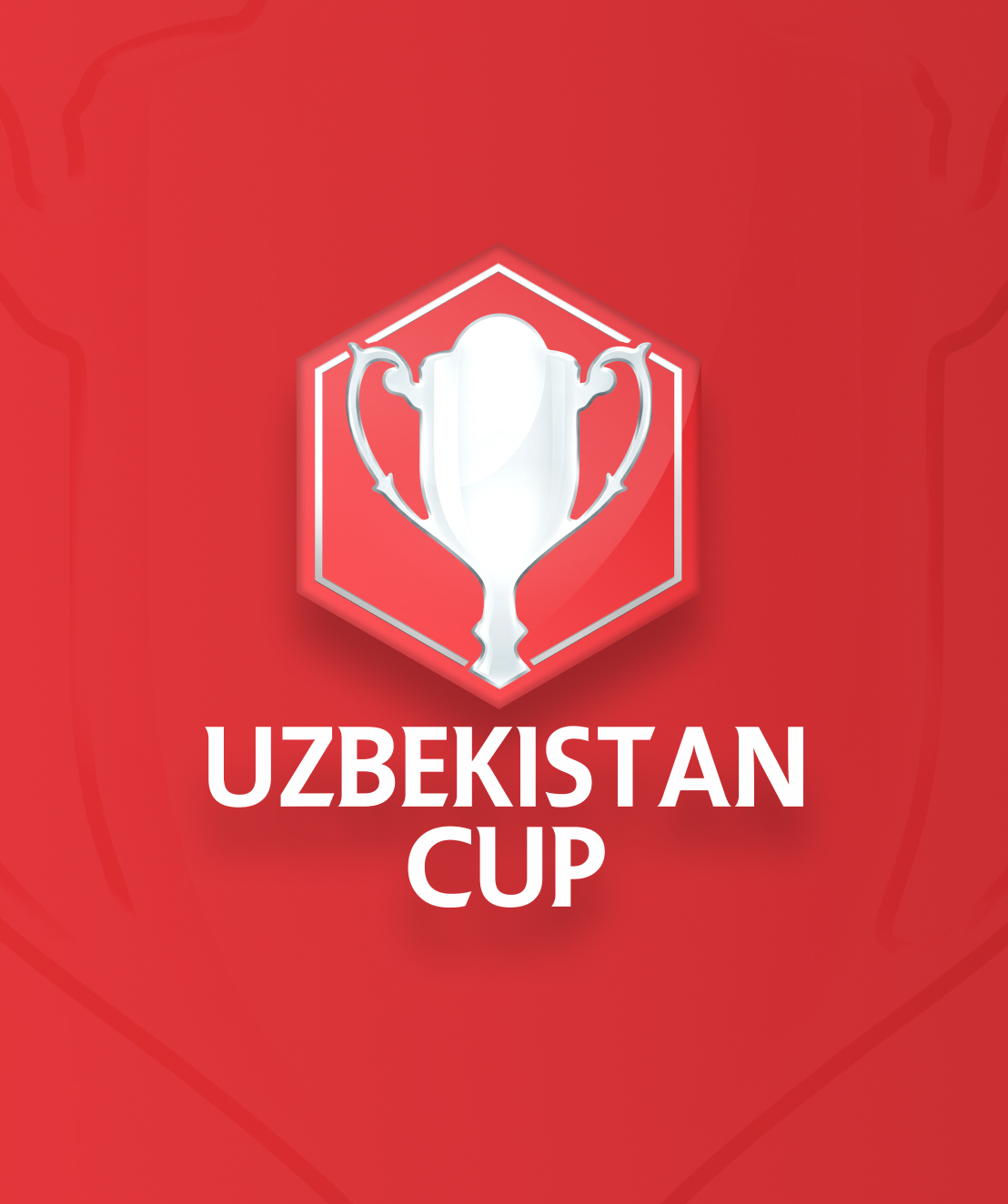
- Organising body: Uzbekistan Professional Football League
- Founded: 1992
- Country: Uzbekistan
- Confederation: AFC (Asia)
- Number of clubs: 50 (2025)
- Current champions: Pakhtakor (14th title)
- Most championships: Pakhtakor (14 titles)
- Broadcaster: Sport TV
- Website: https://pfl.uz/
- Current: 2026

The Uzbekistan Cup (Uzbek: O'zbekiston Kubogi or Ўзбекистон Кубоги) is an annual football cup tournament in Uzbekistan.

Held since 1992, this is the oldest competition in Uzbek football. Since Uzbekistan's independence, the first winner of the cup was the Namangan club Navbahor. The winner of the Uzbekistan Cup gets the right to participate in the AFC Champions League Two.

== List of finals ==
The following is a collection of all finals including goal scorers.

October 25, 1992 1992	Navbahor Namangan	0–0 (6–5 p)	Temiryo'lchi Qo'qon	Dynamo Stadium, Samarkand
				Attendance: 7,000; Referee: Imamov (UZK)
	Penalties
	Keldiyev (penalty scored); Abduraimov (penalty scored); Klochkov (penalty scored); Davletov (penalty missed); Zabirov (penalty scored); Bashkevich (penalty missed); Arslonov (penalty scored); Rahimov (penalty scored)		(penalty scored) Abdullayev; (penalty scored) Aliyev; (penalty missed) Raxmatullin; (penalty scored) Golovanov; (penalty scored) Nurmatov; (penalty missed) Ageyev; (penalty scored) Osmonov; (penalty missed) Atoyan

October 9, 1993 1993	Pakhtakor	3–0	Navbahor Namangan	Pakhtakor Markaziy Stadium, Tashkent
	Khasanov 60'; Qosimov 79'; Galeyev 90'			Attendance: 8,000; Referee: Lutfulin (UZB)

6 September 1994 1994	Neftchi Farg'ona	2–0	FK Yangiyer	MHSK Stadium, Tashkent
	Bozorov 33'; Durmonov 85'			Attendance: 10,000; Referee: Osimov (UZB)

19 November 1995 1995	Navbahor Namangan	1–0	MHSK Tashkent	Pakhtakor Markaziy Stadium, Tashkent
	Vinnikov 51'			Attendance: 6,000; Referee: Imamov (UZB)

10 November 1996 1996	Neftchi Farg'ona	0–0 (5–4 p)	Pakhtakor	Pakhtakor Markaziy Stadium, Tashkent
				Attendance: 5,000; Referee: Aytekov (UZB)
	Penalties
	Ni (penalty scored); Fuzaylov (penalty scored); Kholmatov (penalty scored); Shamsiyev (penalty scored); Andreyev (penalty scored)		(penalty scored) Abduraimov; (penalty scored) Shirshov; (penalty scored) Khodiev; (penalty scored) Nazarov; (penalty missed) Akopyants

25 November 1997 1997	Pakhtakor	3–2 (a.e.t.)	Neftchi Farg'ona	Pakhtakor Markaziy Stadium, Tashkent
	Abduraimov 36' (pen.); Akopyants 88', 118'		Knyazev 12'; Durmonov 80'	Attendance: 10,000; Referee: Nadjafaliev (UZB)

29 August 1998 1998	Neftchi Farg'ona	0–2	Navbahor Namangan	Pakhtakor Markaziy Stadium, Tashkent
			Rakhmankulov 38'; Soliev 51'	Attendance: 9,000; Referee: Imamov (UZB)

Not Held 1999	v

29 June 2000 2000	Dustlik	4–1	FK Samarqand-Dinamo	Pakhtakor Markaziy Stadium, Tashkent
	Irismetov 15', 68'; Khabibulin 29'; Marifaliyev 86'		Usmankhojaev 71'	Attendance: 20,000; Referee: Imamov (UZB)

4 August 2001 2001	Pakhtakor	2–1	Neftchi Farg'ona	Pakhtakor Markaziy Stadium, Tashkent
	Koshelev 26', 57'		Berdiev 34'	Attendance: — Referee: —

9 August 2002 2002	Pakhtakor	6–3 (a.e.t.)	Neftchi Farg'ona	Pakhtakor Markaziy Stadium, Tashkent
				Attendance: — Referee: —

15 August 2003 2003	Pakhtakor	3–1	Nasaf Qarshi	Pakhtakor Markaziy Stadium, Tashkent
	Jeparov 13'; Koshelev 33'; Qosimov 84'		Mansurov 38'	Attendance: 15,000; Referee: Lutfulin (UZB)

1 October 2004 2004	Pakhtakor	3–2	Traktor Tashkent	Pakhtakor Markaziy Stadium, Tashkent
	Shishelov 15'; Jeparov 23'; Soliev 44'		Khasanov 48'; Ayzatullov 58'	Attendance: 10,000; Referee: Roman (UZB)

26 November 2005 2005	Pakhtakor	1–0	Neftchi Farg'ona	Pakhtakor Markaziy Stadium, Tashkent
	Soliev 24'			Attendance: 8,000; Referee: Karimov (UZB)

8 November 2006 2006	Pakhtakor	2–0	Mash'al Mubarek	Pakhtakor Markaziy Stadium, Tashkent
	Bayramov 45+1'; Iheruome 83'			Attendance: 17,000; Referee: Lutfulin (UZB)

9 December 2007 2007	Pakhtakor	0–0 (7–6 p)	Kuruvchi	MHSK Stadium, Tashkent
14:00 UZT (UTC+5)		Summary		Attendance: 11,500; Referee: Noil Lutfullin
	Penalties
	Jeparov (penalty scored); Inomov (penalty scored); Kapadze (penalty scored); K.Tajiev (penalty scored); Aliqulov (penalty scored); Magdeev (penalty scored); Juraev (penalty scored)		(penalty scored) Khvostunov; (penalty scored) Karpenko; (penalty scored) Nazarov; (penalty scored) Lushan; (penalty scored) Goçguly Goçgulyýew; (penalty scored) Salomov; (penalty missed) Gafurov

31 October 2008 2008	Pakhtakor	1–3 (a.e.t.)	Bunyodkor	Pakhtakor Markaziy Stadium, Tashkent
	Ahmedov 35'		Hasanov 40'; Soliev 101', 114'	Attendance: 12,124; Referee: Irmatov (UZB)

8 August 2009 2009	Pakhtakor	1–0	Bunyodkor	Pakhtakor Markaziy Stadium, Tashkent
	Andreev 69'			Attendance: 14,719; Referee: Irmatov (UZB)

18 August 2010 2010	Bunyodkor	1–0	Shurtan Guzar	Pakhtakor Markaziy Stadium, Tashkent
	Ristić 62'	Report		Attendance: 8,247

13 November 2011 2011	Pakhtakor	3–1	Nasaf Qarshi	Pakhtakor Markaziy Stadium, Tashkent
	Klimiashvili 5'; Kletskov 29'; Klimiashvili 80'	Report	Jiyamuradov 90+2'	Attendance: 12,005; Referee: Ravshan Irmatov

30 November 2012 2012	Bunyodkor	3–0	Nasaf Qarshi	Pakhtakor Markaziy Stadium, Tashkent
15:00 UTC+05:00	Salomov 8'; Murzoev 34'; Karpenko 80'	Report		Attendance: 7,000; Referee: Ravshan Irmatov

25 September 2013 2013	Bunyodkor	2–1	Nasaf Qarshi	Tashkent
18:00 UZT (UTC+5)	Pyschur 52', 85'	Summary	Ilkhom Yunusov 63'	Stadium: Pakhtakor Markaziy Stadium; Attendance: 5,228; Referee: Ravshan Irmatov

12 November 2014 2014	Bunyodkor	0–1 (a.e.t.)	Lokomotiv Tashkent	Olmaliq
17:00 UZT (UTC+5)		Summary	Jasur Hasanov 107'	Stadium: Olmaliq SM Stadium; Referee: Kim Dong-jin (referee) (South Korea)

17 October 2015 2015	Bunyodkor	1–2	Nasaf Qarshi
17:00 UZT (UTC+5)

30 November 2016 2016	Lokomotiv Tashkent	1–0	Nasaf Qarshi	Samarqand
17:00 UZT (UTC+5)

4 December 2017 2017	Lokomotiv	1–0	Bunyodkor	Stadion Bunyodkor, Tashkent
				Referee: Mohammed Abdulla Hassan Mohamed (UAE)

28 October 2018 2018	AGMK	3–1	Pakhtakor

26 October 2019 2019	Pakhtakor	3–0	AGMK

20 December 2020 2020	Pakhtakor	3–0	AGMK	Namangan
15:00		Soccerway		Stadium: Markaziy Stadion; Referee: Z. Kadyrov

4 December 2021 2021	Pakhtakor	1–2	FC Nasaf	Samarqand
16:00		Soccerway		Stadium: Stadion Dinamo; Referee: A. Riskullaev

30 October 2022 2022	Navbahor	1–2 (a.e.t.)	FC Nasaf	Bukhara
17:00		Soccerway		Stadium: Buxoro Arena

12 November 2023 2023	Nasaf	1–0	AGMK	Qarshi
17:00 (UTC+6)				Stadium: Markaziy Stadium

5 October 2024 2024	Navbahor	2–3	Andijon	Fergana
17:00 (UTC+5)	Abror Ismoilov 53'; Farrukh Sayfiev 119'	Report	Muhammadkarim Toirov 82'; Islom Mamatkazin 116'; Vladimir Bubanja 120+3'	Stadium: Istiqlol; Referee: Khalid Salikh at-Turais

29 October 2025 2025	Pakhtakor	1–0	Buxoro FK	Andijon
18:30 (UTC+5)	Xojimat Erkinov 63'	Report		Stadium: Bobur Arena; Attendance: 6814; Referee: Nayim Qosimov

== Performance by club ==
Club	Winners	Runners-up	Winning years
Pakhtakor	14	4	1993, 1997, 2001, 2002, 2003, 2004, 2005, 2006, 2007, 2009, 2011, 2019, 2020, 2025
Bunyodkor	4	5	2008, 2010, 2012, 2013
Nasaf Qarshi	4	5	2015, 2021, 2022, 2023
Navbahor Namangan	3	2	1992, 1995, 1998
Lokomotiv Tashkent	3	–	2014, 2016, 2017
Neftchi Farg'ona	2	5	1994, 1996
AGMK	1	3	2018
Dustlik	1	–	2000
FK Andijon	1	–	2024
MHSK Tashkent	–	1	
Shurtan Guzar	–	1	
FK Samarqand-Dinamo	–	1	
Mash'al Mubarek	–	1	
Traktor Tashkent	–	1	
FK Yangiyer	–	1	
Temiryo'lchi Qo'qon	–	1	
