= 2014 Uzbekistan Cup final =

- Event: 2014 Uzbekistan Cup
| Lokomotiv | Bunyodkor |
| 1 | 0 |
- Match Report
- Date: 12 November 2014; 11 years ago
- Venue: AGMK Stadium, Tashkent Region
- Referee: Kim Dong-jin (South Korea)
- Attendance: 8,247 spectators
- Weather: Sunny

2014 Uzbekistan Cup final (in Uzbek: Futbol boʻyicha 2014-yilgi Oʻzbekiston Kubogi finali) was the final match of the 2014 Uzbekistan Cup, held for the 22nd time. The final was played at OKMK Stadium in Olmaliq between the Tashkent-based clubs Lokomotiv and Bunyodkor. Lokomotiv won the cup for the first time in its history and qualified for the 2015 AFC Champions League.

== Match details ==
12 November 2014, 17:00 UZT; Olmaliq; AGMK Stadium. 8,247 spectators Referee: (South Korea) Kim Dong-jin
Lokomotiv (Tashkent) | 1:0 | Bunyodkor (Tashkent)
Jasur Hasanov | 107'
Starting Line-up:
Ignatiy Nesterov | Ignatiy Nesterov
Boburbek Yoʻldashov | (substituted off) 46' | Akmal Shorahmedov
Salim Mustafoev | Hayrulla Karimov
Islom Tukhtakhujaev | (yellow card) 56' | Chaker Zouaghi
Shavkat Mullajonov | (substituted off) 74' | (yellow card) 87' | Javlon Ibrohimov
Dilshod Rahmatullaev | Minori Sato
Sadriddin Abdullaev | (substituted off) 61' | Ivan Milošević
Fozil Musaev | (substituted off) 74' | Vohid Shodiev
Lutfullo Turaev | Samir Bekrić
Alisher Shogʻulomov | (substituted off) 106' | Sardor Rashidov
Aleksandr Geynrix | (substituted off) 101' | Oleg Zoteev
Substitutes:
Jasur Hasanov | (substituted on) 61' (goal) 107' (yellow card) 119' (yellow card) 120' | (substituted on) 46' Akramjon Komilov
Ibrohim Rahimov | (substituted on) 74' | (substituted on) 74' Zabikhillo Oʻrinboyev
Marat Bikmayev | (substituted on) 106' | (substituted on) 101' Dostonbek Hamdamov
Head Coaches:
Vadim Abramov | Sergey Lushan
