= 2018 Uzbekistan Cup final =

- Event: 2018 Uzbekistan Cup
AGMK	Pakhtakor
3	1
- Report
- Date: 28 October 2018; 7 years ago
- Venue: Istiqlol, Ferghana
- Referee: Timur Tukhtasinov (Uzbekistan)
- Attendance: 11.152
- Weather: Cloudy

2018 Uzbekistan Cup final (in Uzbek: Futbol boʻyicha 2018-yilgi Oʻzbekiston Kubogi finali) was the 26th final match of Uzbekistan Cup.

The draw for the final was made on 18 April 2018.

The final match was held on October 28 at the Istiqlol Stadium in Fergana between Olmaliq's AGMK and Tashkent's Pakhtakor. AGMK won the cup for the first time in its history.

== Squads ==
AGMK: Roman Abdulov, Vladimir Bubanja, Uladzislaw Kasmynin, Abduqahhor Hojiakbarov, Azamat Isroilov, Jasur Hasanov, Lutfulla Turaev, Zokhir Pirimov, Kamoliddin Murzoev, Jovan Đokić, Oybek Kilichev.

Pakhtakor: Eldorbek Suyunov, Akmal Shorakhmedov, Sherzod Azamov, Marko Simić, Farrukh Sayfiev, Dilshod Rakhmatullaev, Vladimir Kozak, Esmaël Gonçalves, Dragan Ćeran, Jaloliddin Masharipov, Tiago Bezerra.
