= 2016 Uzbekistan Cup final =

- Event: 2016 Uzbekistan Cup
Lokomotiv	Nasaf
1	0
- Report
- Date: November 30, 2016; 8 years ago
- Venue: Dinamo, Samarkand
- Referee: Vladislav Tseytlin (Uzbekistan)
- Attendance: 16.711
- Weather: Sunny

2016 Uzbekistan Cup final (in Uzbek: Futbol boʻyicha 2016-yilgi Oʻzbekiston Kubogi finali) was the final match of 2016 Uzbekistan Cup. The final match was held on November 30, 2016, at the Dinamo Stadium in Samarkand between Lokomotiv Tashkent and Nasaf Karshi. Lokomotiv became the champion for the second time in its history.

== Squads ==
„Lokomotiv": Mamur Ikromov, Kakhi Makharadze, Temurkhuja Abdukholiqov, Sardor Mirzaev, Salim Mustafoyev, Timur Kapadze, Islom Tukhtakhujaev, Sanjar Shaakhmedov (Boburbek Yuldashov, 84), Ikromjon Alibaev, Sherzod Fayziev (Oleg Zoteyev, 73), Artur Gevorkýan (Marat Bikmaev, 54).

„Nasaf": Eldorbek Suyunov, Azizjon Ganiev, Shukhrat Mukhammadiev, Bahrom Abdurahimov, Igor Golban, Sherzod Azamov, Fozil Musaev, Odiljon Hamrobekov (Shakhboz Erkinov, 59), Farrukh Sayfiev, Doniyor Narzullayev, Dragan Ćeran (Bobur Abdikholikov, 70).

== Match ==
30-noyabr 2016-yil Final	Lokomotiv	1–0	Nasaf	Samarkand
(UTC+6)	Abduxoliqov 2'	Report		Stadium: Dinamo; Referee: Vladislav Tseytlin
