= 2018 Uzbekistan Cup =

2018 O'zbekiston Kubogi
Tournament details
- Country: Uzbekistan
- Teams: 36

Final positions
- Champions: AGMK (1st title)
- Runners-up: Pakhtakor
- AFC Champions League: AGMK

The 2018 Uzbekistan Cup was the 26th season of the annual Uzbekistan Cup, the knockout football cup competition of Uzbekistan.

A total of 26 teams participate in the tournament. The cup winner is guaranteed a place in the 2019 AFC Champions League.

== Preliminary round ==
The matches were played on 2 April 2018.

02/04/18

Nurafshon 1 - 3 Ithichor

Sherdor 1 - 1 (aet; 7 - 6 p) Labsa

== Round of 32 ==
The draw for the round of 32 was held on 28 February 2018. Lokomotiv, Nasaf, Pakhtakor and Bunyodkor received byes before the draw.

The matches were played on 15–16 April 2018.

15/04/18

Lokomotiv BFK 0 - 4 Surkhon

Khotira-79 0 - 1 (aet) Dinamo Samarqand

Zaamin 2 - 3 (aet) Kokand-1912

Sherdor-Presstizh 3 - 2 Xorazm

Mash'al 1 - 0 Istiklol

Sogdiana 1 - 0 Metalourg

AGMK 1 - 0 Norin

Andijan 1 - 0 Navbahor

16/04/18

Aral Nukus 5 - 1 G'ijduvon

Iftixor 1 - 0 Yozyovon

Shortan 0 - 2 Neftchi

Qizilqum 3 - 2 (aet) Buxoro

== Round of 16 ==
The draw for the round of 16 was held on 18 April 2018.

The matches were played on 28–30 May 2018.

| 28 May 2018 | FK Iftikhor | 0–6 | Pakhtakor | Pakhtakor Central Stadium |
| 19:00 UZT | | Report | Khakimov 34', 73'; Yakhshiboev 48', 50'; Abdurahimov 54'; Ibragimov 83' | Attendance: 423; Referee: Shavkat Nasibullayev |

| 29 May 2018 | Orol | 0–2 | Andijon | Turan Stadium |
| 17:00 UZT | | Report | Jumaboyev 74'; Mamatkazin 90' | Attendance: 2,523; Referee: Firdavs Norsafarov |

| 29 May 2018 | Bunyodkor | 1–0 | Sogdiana | Milliy Stadium |
| 19:00 UZT | Qosimov 10' | Report | | Attendance: 5,043; Referee: Jasur Mukhtarov |

| 29 May 2018 | PFK Mashal | 1–1 | Surkhon Termez | Bahrom Vafoev Stadium |
| 19:20 UZT | Rakhmanov 40' | Report | Usmanov 80' | Attendance: 576; Referee: Iskhakh Ibragimov |

| 30 May 2018 | Dinamo | 0–3 | Qizilqum | Dinamo Samarkand Stadium |
| 17:00 UZT | | Report | Usmonov 2'; Qambarov 8'; Sidorov 84' | Attendance: 3,114; Referee: Akhmatdjon Ergashev |

| 30 May 2018 | Kokand 1912 | 2–1 (a.e.t.) | Neftchi | Kokand Markaziy Stadium |
| 18:57 UZT | Akramov 27'; Kholmukhamedov 111' (pen.) | Report | Karimov 7' | Attendance: 2,786; Referee: Asqar Najafaliyev |

| 30 May 2018 | Lokomotiv | 7–0 | Sherdor | Lokomotiv Stadium |
| 19:03 UZT | Alibaev 28'; Mirzaev 38'; Nivaldo 41', 83'; Rashidov 51'; Tukhtakhodjaev 58'; Yuldashov 76' | Report | | Attendance: 574; Referee: Rustam Lutfullin |

| 30 May 2018 | AGMK | 2–1 | Nasaf | AGMK Stadium |
| 19:03 UZT | Zokirov 29'; Đokić 30' | Report | Rakhmatov 74' | Attendance: 5,855; Referee: Ravshan Irmatov |

== Quarter-finals ==
The draw for the quarter-finals was held on 10 July 2018.

The matches were played on 18–19 September 2018.

| 18 September 2018 | Kokand 1912 | 2–0 | Qizilqum | Kokand Markaziy Stadium |
| 18:00 UZT | | Report |

| 18 September 2018 | Pakhtakor | 4–0 | Lokomotiv | Pakhtakor Central Stadium |
| 20:00 UZT | | Report |

| 19 September 2018 | Andijon | 1–2 | Bunyodkor | Soghlom Avlod Stadium |
| 18:00 UZT | | Report |

| 19 September 2018 | AGMK | 3–1 (a.e.t.) | PFK Mashal | AGMK Stadium |
| 20:00 UZT | | Report |

== Semi-finals ==
The matches will be played on 27–28 September 2018.

| 27 September 2018 | Kokand 1912 | 2–5 | Pakhtakor | Kokand Markaziy Stadium |
| 18:30 | | Report |

| 28 September 2018 | Bunyodkor | 1–2 | AGMK | Milliy Stadium |
| 18:30 | | Report |

== Final ==
The final was played on 28 October 2018 at the Istiqlol Stadium, Fergana.

| 28 October 2018 | AGMK | 3–1 | Pakhtakor | Istiqlol Stadium |
| 15:00 UZT | Đokić 17' (pen.), 57'; Pirimov 89' | Report | Gonçalves 54' (pen.) | Attendance: 11,152 |
