= Nesterov (disambiguation) =

Nesterov is a town in Kaliningrad Oblast, Russia.

Nesterov may also refer to:

- Nesterov (surname)
- Nesterov, name of the town of Zhovkva in Lviv Oblast, Ukraine, before 1992
- 3071 Nesterov, an asteroid
- Nesterov assault rifle, a 1960s era Soviet assault rifle

== See also ==
- Nesterovsky (disambiguation)
