= 2019 Uzbekistan Cup final =

- Event: 2019 Uzbekistan Cup
Pakhtakor	AGMK
3	0
- Report
- Date: 28 October 2019; 6 years ago
- Venue: Lokomotiv, Tashkent
- Man of the Match: Dragan Ćeran
- Referee: Sherzod Kasymov (Uzbekistan)
- Attendance: 7185
- Weather: Cloudy

The 2019 Uzbekistan Cup final (in Uzbek: Футбол бўйича 2019-йилги Ўзбекистон Кубоги финали) was the 27th final match of Uzbekistan Cup.

On 24 May 2019, the competition logo was approved. On 14 October, it was announced that the Cup final would start at 17:00 on 26 October at the Lokomotiv Stadium in Tashkent. Pakhtakor became the owner of the Uzbekistan Cup for the 12th time in its history.

== Squads ==
„Pakhtakor“: 25.Eldorbek Suyunov – 3.Khojiakbar Alijonov, 23.Sherzod Azamov, 55.Marko Simić, 34.Farrukh Sayfiev (29.Vladimir Kozak, 86) – 20.Odiljon Hamrobekov, 27.Sardor Sabirkhodjaev (15.Egor Krimets, 89)- 9.Jaloliddin Masharipov, 10.Dragan Ćeran, 17.Dostonbek Khamdamov – 11.Igor Sergeev (21.Marat Bikmaev, 80).

Subs: 35.Sanjar Kuvvatov, 5.Alisher Salimov, 14.Khumoyunmirzo Iminov, 19.Shohrux Mahmudhojiyev, 43.Ibrokhimkhalil Yuldoshev, 77.Husniddin Gafurov.

„AGMK“: 32.Suhrob Sultonov – 23.Akmal Shorakhmedov, 44.Boburbek Yoʻldashov, 33.Sardor Rahmonov, 31.Saydullo Rahmatov – 3.Erkin Boydullayev, 5.Dilshod Juraev, 4.Mirjamol Qosimov (30.Jasur Umarov, 46) – 7.Elgujja Grigalashvili (8.Sanat Shikhov, 63), 99.Shahzod Nurmatov (15.Jasur Hakimov, 74), 17.Murodjon Toshmatov.

Subs: 12.Roman Abdulov, 11.Zokhir Pirimov, 20.Mirgʻiyos Sulaymonov, 55.Sardor Abdunabiyev, 77.Uladzislaw Kasmynin, 88.Igor Zonjić.
