= 2013 Uzbekistan Cup final =

- Event: 2013 Uzbekistan Cup
Bunyodkor	Nasaf
2	1
- Match Report
- Date: 25 September 2013; 12 years ago
- Venue: Pakhtakor Stadium, Tashkent
- Referee: Ravshan Irmatov (Uzbekistan)
- Attendance: 5228 spectators
- Weather: Sunny

2013 Uzbekistan Cup final (in Uzbek: Futbol boʻyicha 2013-yilgi Oʻzbekiston Kubogi finali) was the final match of the 2013 Uzbekistan Cup, held for the 21st time. The final was played on 25 September 2013 at Pakhtakor Central Stadium in Tashkent between Bunyodkor Tashkent and Nasaf Qarshi. “Bunyodkor” became the Cup winner for the 4th time and secured a spot in the 2014 AFC Champions League.

== Match details ==
25 September 2013, 17:00; Tashkent. “Pakhtakor Stadium”. 5228 spectators. Main referee: Ravshan Irmatov (Tashkent)
Bunyodkor (Tashkent)	2:1	Nasaf (Qarshi)
Oleksandr Pishchur 52'	Goal	Ilhom Yunusov 63'
Oleksandr Pishchur 85'	Goal
Starting Line-ups:
Murod Zukhurov	Eldorbek Suyunov
Akmal Shorakhmedov	(yellow card) 57'	Hamza Karimov
Anvar Gafurov	(yellow card) 36'	(substituted off) 59'	Laziz Ubaydullayev
Artyom Filiposyan	Sherzod Azamov
Hayrulla Karimov	Botir Qoraev
Jovlon Ibrokhimov	(yellow card) 49'	Farrukh Sayfiev
Lutfulla Turaev	(substituted off) 85'	Artur Gevorkýan
Jasur Hasanov	Erkin Boydullayev
Sardor Rashidov	(substituted off) 77'	(substituted off) 90' Azamat Allaniyozov
Igor Taran	(substituted off) 85'	(yellow card) 54' (goal) 63' Ilhom Yunusov
Oleksandr Pishchur	52' 85'	Ilkhom Shomurodov
Substitutes:
Marko Blajić	(substituted on) 67'	(substituted on) 59' Shukhrat Muhammadiyev
Alibobo Rakhmatullaev	(substituted on) 77'	(substituted on) 90' Zokhid Abdullaev
Dilshod Juraev	(substituted on) 85'
Head Coaches:
(Uzbekistan) Mirjalol Qosimov	Ruziqul Berdiev (Uzbekistan)
