= Nesterovsky (inhabited locality) =

Nesterovsky (Russian: Нестеровский; masculine), Nesterovskaya (Нестеровская; feminine), or Nesterovskoye (Нестеровское; neuter) is the name of several rural localities in Russia.

== Arkhangelsk Oblast ==
As of 2011, seven rural localities in Arkhangelsk Oblast bear this name:

- Nesterovskaya, Krasnoborsky District, Arkhangelsk Oblast, a village in Permogorsky Selsoviet of Krasnoborsky District
- Nesterovskaya, Nyandomsky District, Arkhangelsk Oblast, a village in Moshinsky Selsoviet of Nyandomsky District
- Nesterovskaya, Shenkursky District, Arkhangelsk Oblast, a village in Fedorogorsky Selsoviet of Shenkursky District
- Nesterovskaya, Velsky District, Arkhangelsk Oblast, a village in Puysky Selsoviet of Velsky District
- Nesterovskaya, Fedkovsky Selsoviet, Verkhnetoyemsky District, Arkhangelsk Oblast, a village in Fedkovsky Selsoviet of Verkhnetoyemsky District
- Nesterovskaya, Puchuzhsky Selsoviet, Verkhnetoyemsky District, Arkhangelsk Oblast, a village in Puchuzhsky Selsoviet of Verkhnetoyemsky District
- Nesterovskaya, Vilegodsky District, Arkhangelsk Oblast, a village in Belyayevsky Selsoviet of Vilegodsky District

== Republic of Ingushetia ==
As of 2011, one rural locality in the Republic of Ingushetia bears this name:

- Nesterovskaya, Republic of Ingushetia, a stanitsa in Sunzhensky District

== Volgograd Oblast ==
As of 2011, one rural locality in Volgograd Oblast bears this name:

- Nesterovsky (rural locality), a khutor in Sukhovsky Selsoviet of Alexeyevsky District

== Vologda Oblast ==
As of 2011, two rural localities in Vologda Oblast bear this name:

- Nesterovskoye, Cherepovetsky District, Vologda Oblast, a village in Anninsky Selsoviet of Cherepovetsky District
- Nesterovskoye, Vologodsky District, Vologda Oblast, a village in Novlensky Selsoviet of Vologodsky District
