= 2009 Uzbekistan Cup final =

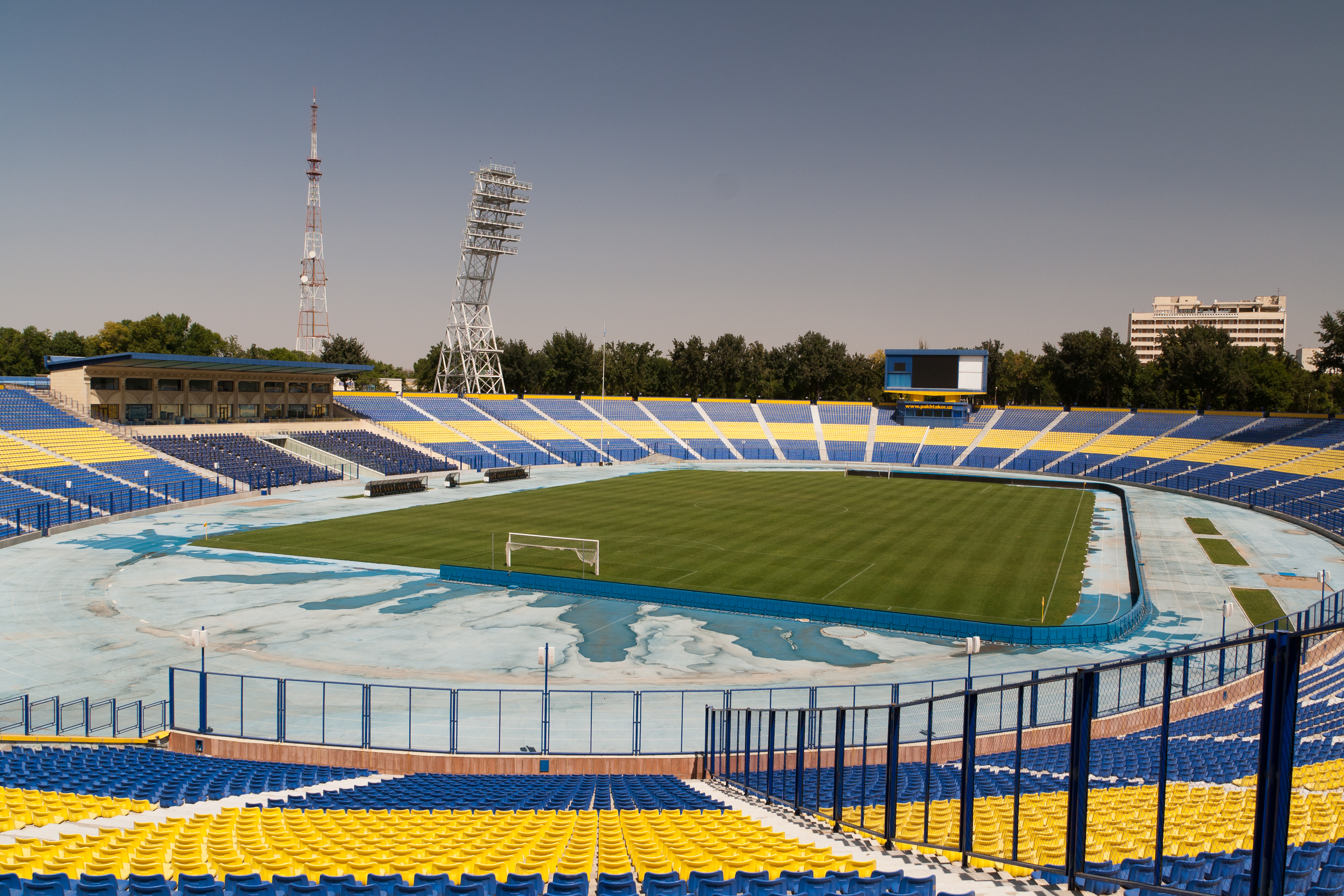
- Event: 2009 Uzbekistan Cup
Pakhtakor	Bunyodkor
1	0
- Date: August 29, 2009; 17 years ago
- Venue: Pakhtakor Central Stadium, Tashkent
- Referee: Marat Ismailov
- Attendance: 27543

2009 Uzbekistan Cup final (Uzbek: Футбол бўйича 2009-йилги Ўзбекистон Кубоги финали) was the final match of the 2009 Uzbekistan Cup competition, held on 29 August 2009 at the Pakhtakor Stadium in Tashkent. The match was contested between Pakhtakor and Bunyodkor.

Pakhtakor won the match 1–0 and became the winner of the Uzbekistan Cup. The club claimed the trophy for the 10th time in its history.

== Details ==
8 August 2009
17:00 UZT

(Uzbekistan) Pakhtakor	1–0	(Uzbekistan) Bunyodkor
Andreev 35'	Report

Pakhatkor
Attendance: 27,543
Referee: Marat Ismailov (Uzbekistan)
