= Ikromjon Alibaev =

Uzbekistani footballer

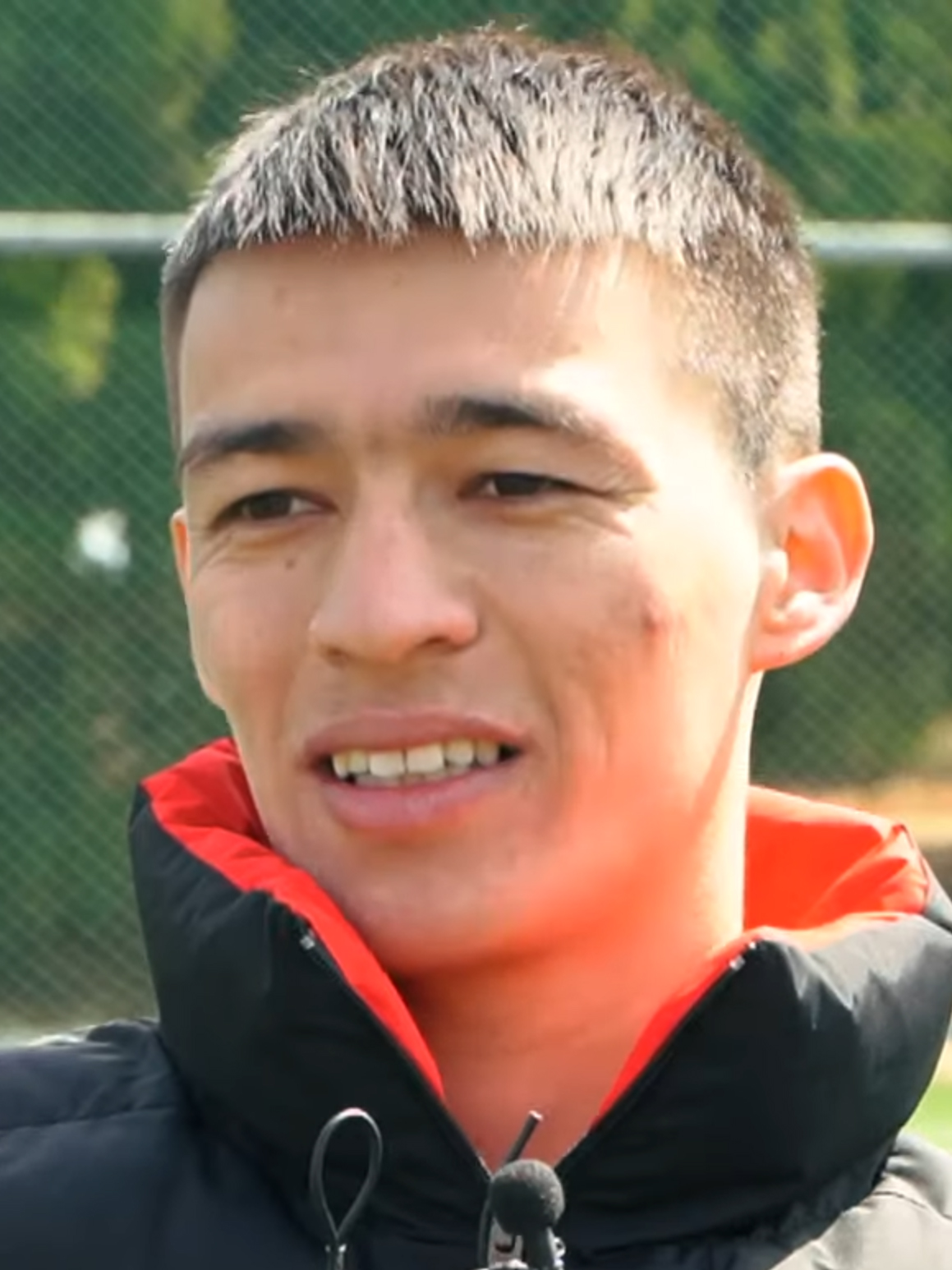
- Alibaev in 2020

Personal information
- Date of birth: 9 January 1994 (age 32)
- Place of birth: Tashkent, Uzbekistan
- Height: 1.73 m (5 ft 8 in)
- Position: Midfielder

Team information
- Current team: Neftchi Fergana
- Number: 5

Senior career*
Years	Team	Apps	(Gls)
2013–2018	Lokomotiv Tashkent	97	(11)
2019–2021	FC Seoul	46	(3)
2021	Daejeon Hana Citizen	17	(1)
2022	Pakhtakor Tashkent	18	(0)
2023	Gangwon FC	23	(1)
2024	Seongnam FC	17	(0)
2025–	Neftchi Fergana	35	(4)

International career^{‡}
- Uzbekistan U17
2016–2018	Uzbekistan U23	6	(5)
2015–	Uzbekistan	28	(0)
- * Club domestic league appearances and goals as of 20:12, 28 July 2026 (UTC) ‡ National team caps and goals as of 15 November 2021

Ikromjon Alibaev (Uzbek Cyrillic: Икромжон Алибаев; born 9 January 1994) is an Uzbek professional footballer who plays as a midfielder for Neftchi Fergana and the Uzbekistan national team.

== Club career ==
=== Lokomotiv Tashkent ===
Alibaev debuted for the senior team of Lokomotiv Tashkent on 8 November 2013, in a league match against FK Buxoro.

=== FC Seoul ===
On 13 December 2018, Alibaev signed a three-year contract with the K League 1 side FC Seoul. He had contributed the club to reach the third place of the league table and 2020 AFC Champions League, but had to be out for season due to the injury during the 2020 season.

=== Daejeon Hana Citizen ===
In 2021, Alibaev terminated his contract with FC Seoul through a mutual consent and then joined K League 2 side Daejeon Hana Citizen. He then left the club at the end of the season.

=== Pakhtakor Tashkent ===
In 2022, Alibaev returned to Uzbekistan and joined Pakhtakor Tashkent FK.

=== Neftchi Fergana ===
On January 4, 2025, a member of the Uzbekistan Super League, he signed a contract with the Fergana club Neftchi.

== International career ==
After being called up by then Uzbekistan national team coach, Mirjalol Qosimov, Alibaev made his debut in a friendly match against Iran on 11 July 2015.

== Career statistics ==
=== Club ===
As of 8 April 2024

Appearances and goals by club, season and competition
Club	Season	League			Cup		Continental		Other		Total	
Club	Season	Division	Apps	Goals	Apps	Goals	Apps	Goals	Apps	Goals	Apps	Goals
Lokomotiv Tashkent	2013	Uzbekistan Super League	3	0	2	0	—		—		5	0
Lokomotiv Tashkent	2014	Uzbekistan Super League	0	0	—		0	0	—		0	0
Lokomotiv Tashkent	2015	Uzbekistan Super League	25	2	2	0	3 (Note: Appearance(s) in AFC Champions League)	0	—		30	2
Lokomotiv Tashkent	2016	Uzbekistan Super League	22	1	5	1	7	0	—		34	2
Lokomotiv Tashkent	2017	Uzbekistan Super League	22	4	5	0	3	0	—		30	4
Lokomotiv Tashkent	2018	Uzbekistan Super League	25	4	2	1	5	2	—		32	7
Lokomotiv Tashkent	Total		97	11	16	2	18	2	—		131	15
FC Seoul	2019	K League 1	35	3	—		—		—		35	3
FC Seoul	2020	K League 1	11	0	2	0	2	1	—		15	1
FC Seoul	2021	K League 1	0	0	—		—		—		0	0
FC Seoul	Total		46	3	2	0	2	1	—		50	4
Daejeon Hana Citizen	2021	K League 2	17	1	—		—		—		17	1
Pakhtakor Tashkent	2022	Uzbekistan Super League	18	0	2	0	5	0	1 (Note: Appearance(s) in Uzbekistan Super Cup)	0	26	0
Gangwon FC	2023	K League 1	23	1	0	0	—		2 (Note: Appearance(s) in Promotion/Relegation play-offs)	0	25	1
Seongnam FC	2024	K League 2	2	0	—		—		—		2	0
Career total			203	16	20	2	25	3	3	0	251	21

== Honours ==
Lokomotiv Tashkent

- Uzbekistan Super League: 2016, 2017, 2018
- Uzbekistan Cup: 2014, 2016, 2017
- Uzbekistan Super Cup: 2015
