= 2015 Uzbekistan Cup final =

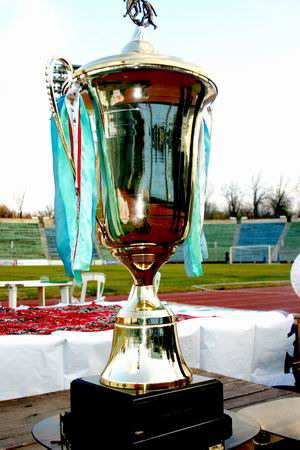
- Event: 2015 Uzbekistan Cup
	Nasaf
Bunyodkor
1	2
- Date: 17 October 2015
- Venue: Sogdiana Stadium, Jizzakh
- Man of the Match: Artur Gevorkyan
- Referee: Ravshan Irmatov
- Attendance: 11,650

2015 Uzbekistan Cup final was the 23rd final of Uzbekistan Cup, held on October 17, 2015, at the Sogdiana Stadium in Jizzakh, where Bunyodkor and Nasaf competed for the title. The match was officiated by Ravshan Irmatov, who has been named Referee of the Year five times in Asia, ten times in Uzbekistan, and once globally in 2011. Artyom Arutyunov was appointed as the official match inspector by Uzbekistan Professional Football League. Before the 2015 final, Bunyodkor and Nasaf had met twice in previous Uzbekistan Cup finals, with Bunyodkor winning both times. However, after the 2015 final, Nasaf Qarshi claimed their first-ever Uzbekistan Cup victory in club history.
