= Nesterovsky =

Nesterovsky (masculine), Nesterovskaya (feminine), or Nesterovskoye (neuter) may refer to:

- Nesterovsky District, a district of Kaliningrad Oblast, Russia
- Nesterovskoye Urban Settlement, a municipal formation which the town of district significance of Nesterov in Nesterovsky District of Kaliningrad Oblast, Russia is incorporated as
- Nesterovsky (inhabited locality), several rural localities in Russia
