= Nesterov (surname) =

Nesterov (Russian: Нестеров), or Nesterova (feminine; Нестерова), is a Russian surname. Notable people with the surname include:

- Alexander Nesterov (born 1985), Russian ice hockey forward
- Andriy Nesterov (born 1990), Ukrainian football defender
- Ignatiy Nesterov (born 1983), Uzbekistani football goalkeeper
- Margarita Nesterova (born 1989), Russian swimmer
- Mikhail Nesterov (1862–1942), Russian painter
- Nikita Nesterov (born 1993), Russian ice hockey defenceman
- Pyotr Nesterov (1883–1941), Russian herpetologist
- Pyotr Nesterov (1887–1914), Russian aviator, the namesake of the Nesterov Loop aerobatic maneuver
- Svetlana Nesterova, Russian composer and violinist
- Vladimir Nesterov (1949–2022), general director of the Russian State Research and Production Space Center
- Yuri Nesterov (born 1967), Russian handball player
- Yurii Nesterov, Russian mathematician
