= Fozil Musaev =

Uzbekistani footballer

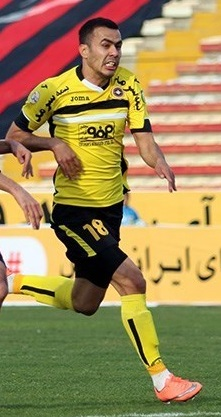
- Musaev playing for Sepahan in 2016

Personal information
- Full name: Fozil Musaev
- Date of birth: 2 January 1989 (age 37)
- Place of birth: Tashkent, Uzbek SSR, Soviet Union
- Height: 1.87 m (6 ft 2 in)
- Positions: Defensive midfielder; centre-back

Team information
- Current team: FC Bukhara
- Number: 28

Senior career*
Years	Team	Apps	(Gls)
2007–2008	Nasaf Qarshi	29	(0)
2009–2011	Mashʼal Mubarek	44	(5)
2011–2012	Nasaf Qarshi	30	(3)
2013	Bunyodkor	12	(1)
2013–2014	Muaither	15	(1)
2014	Lokomotiv Tashkent	22	(2)
2015–2016	Sepahan	40	(2)
2016	Nasaf Qarshi	15	(2)
2017–2020	Júbilo Iwata	51	(5)
2021	Turon Yaypan	20	(2)
2022	Metallurg Bekabad	9	(0)
2022–24	Neftchi Fergana	10	(2)
2024–	FC Bukhara	6	(1)

International career^{‡}
2007–2008	Uzbekistan U19	10	(1)
2009–2011	Uzbekistan U23	18	(2)
2009–	Uzbekistan	26	(0)
- * Club domestic league appearances and goals as of 29 December 2018 ‡ National team caps and goals as of 8 September 2015

Fozil Musaev, also called Fozil Musayev, (Uzbek: Фозил Мусаев; born 2 January 1989) is an Uzbekistani footballer. He plays for FC Bukhara and the Uzbekistan national team as a defensive midfielder.

== Club career ==
In 2007–08 Musaev played for Nasaf Qarshi. On 4 January 2013, Bunyodkor announced signing of Fozil Musaev.

On 19 July 2013, Musaev signed one-year deal with Qatari club Muaither SC.

== International career ==
Musaev has represented Uzbekistan at several international levels. He played for Uzbekistan U-19 in the 2008 AFC U-19 Championship. In 2011, he played for Uzbekistan U-22 and 2012 for Uzbekistan U-23 in qualification matches for 2012 Summer Olympics.

He played his first match for the main national team on 1 February 2009, in a friendly match against Azerbaijan ended with 1–1.

== Career statistics ==
=== Club ===
As of match played 3 June 2024

Appearances and goals by club, season and competition
Club	Season	League			National cup		League cup		Continental		Other		Total	
Club	Season	Division	Apps	Goals	Apps	Goals	Apps	Goals	Apps	Goals	Apps	Goals	Apps	Goals
Nasaf Qarshi	2007	Uzbek League	11	0	0	0	—		—		—		11	0
Nasaf Qarshi	2008	Uzbek League	18	0	0	0	—		—		—		18	0
Nasaf Qarshi	Total		29	0	0	0	—		—		—		29	0
Mashʼal Mubarek	2009	Uzbek League	15	2	0	0	—		—		—		15	2
Mashʼal Mubarek	2010	Uzbek League	19	0	0	0	—		—		—		19	0
Mashʼal Mubarek	2011	Uzbek League	10	3	4	0	—		—		—		14	3
Mashʼal Mubarek	Total		44	5	4	0	—		—		—		48	5
Nasaf Qarshi	2011	Uzbek League	7	1	2	0	—		4	0	—		13	1
Nasaf Qarshi	2012	Uzbek League	23	2	7	1	—		6	1	—		36	4
Nasaf Qarshi	Total		30	3	9	1	—		10	1	—		49	5
Bunyodkor	2013	Uzbek League	12	1	1	0	—		6	2	—		19	3
Muaither	2013–14	Qatar Stars League	15	1	1	0	—		—		—		16	1
Lokomotiv Tashkent	2014	Uzbek League	22	2	5	0	—		—		—		27	2
Sepahan	2014–15	Iran Pro League	13	0	0	0	—		—		—		13	0
Sepahan	2015–16	Iran Pro League	27	2	3	0	—		6	0	—		36	1
Sepahan	Total		40	2	3	1	—		6	0	—		49	1
Nasaf Qarshi	2016	Uzbek League	15	2	4	1	—		—		—		19	3
Júbilo Iwata	2017	J1 League	31	4	0	0	1	0	—		—		32	4
Júbilo Iwata	2018	J1 League	6	1	0	0	2	0	—		0	0	8	1
Júbilo Iwata	2019	J1 League	9	0	2	0	7	0	—		—		18	0
Júbilo Iwata	2020	J2 League	5	0	—		—		—		—		5	0
Júbilo Iwata	Total		51	5	2	0	10	0	—		0	0	63	5
Turon Yaypan	2021	Uzbekistan Super League	20	2	3	0	—		—		—		23	2
Metallurg Bekabad	2022	Uzbekistan Super League	9	0	0	0	—		—		—		9	0
Neftchi Fergana	2022	Uzbekistan Super League	8	2	—		—		—		—		8	2
Neftchi Fergana	2023	Uzbekistan Super League	13	0	3	0	—		—		—		16	0
Neftchi Fergana	Total		21	2	3	0	—		—		—		24	2
Bukhara	2024	Uzbekistan Pro League	6	1	0	0	—		—		—		6	1
Career total			314	26	35	2	10	0	22	3	0	0	381	31

== Honors ==
Nasaf Qarshi

- Uzbek League runner-up: 2011
- Uzbekistan Cup runner-up: 2012
- AFC Cup: 2011

Lokomotiv Tashkent

- Uzbekistan Cup: 2014

Sepahan

- Iran Pro League: 2014–15
