= 2019 Uzbekistan Cup =

2019 O'zbekiston Kubogi

Tournament details
- Country: Uzbekistan
- Teams: 36

Final positions
- Champions: Pakhtakor (12th title)
- Runners-up: AGMK

The 2019 Uzbekistan Cup was the 27th season of the annual Uzbekistan Cup, the knockout football cup competition of Uzbekistan.

A total of 36 teams participate in the tournament. The cup winner is guaranteed a place in the 2020 AFC Champions League.

== Preliminary round ==
19/04/19

Chigatoy 0 - 1 Yashnobod

Ittifok Navoiy 2 - 1 Ittifok Buxoro

== First round ==
The draws for the first round was held on 18 April 2019.

30/04/19

Turan 0 - 1 (aet) Rush-Milk

Zirabulok 4 - 0 Yangiyer

01/05/19

Yashnobod 3 - 1 G'ijduvon

Zarangari 2 - 0 Aral Nukus

Lokomotiv BFK 0 - 2 Zaamin

Rubin 3 - 3 (aet, 3 - 4 p) Ittifok Navoiy

== Second round ==
Ten teams from Super League and eight teams from Pro League A enter.

19/06/19

Bunyodkor 2 - 1 Metalourg

Zaamin 2 - 1 Xorazm

Neftchi 8 - 0 Zirabulok

Surkhon 3 - 2 Rush-Milk

Andijan 4 - 1 Buxoro

Sogdiana CANC Zarangari (Sogdiana advance)

25/06/19

Dinamo Samarqand 2 - 3 (aet) Yashnobod

Kokand-1912 2 - 2 (aet; 6 - 7 p) Qizilqum

26/06/19

Shortan 3 - 5 Mash'al

Sherdor-Presstizh 0 - 1 Oq-tepa

Ittifok Navoiy 2 - 1 Iftixor

Istiklol Fergana 1 - 2 Nasaf

== Round of 16 ==
Lokomotiv, Pakhtakor, Navbahor, and AGMK enter. The draw for the round of 16 was held on 22 July 2019.

03/08/19

Oq-tepa 4 - 4 (aet, 5 - 4 p) Ittifok Navoiy

Bunyodkor 3 - 0 Qizilqum

Sogdiana 6 - 1 Zaamin

AGMK 1 - 0 (aet) Mash'al

04/08/19

Surkhon 3 - 1 Lokomotiv

Nasaf 3 - 0 Andijan

Navbahor 3 - 1 Neftchi

Pakhtakor 5 - 0 Yashnobod

== Quarter-finals ==
The draw for the quarter-finals was held on 5 August 2019.

21/08/19

Oq-tepa 3 - 4 AGMK

Sogdiana 1 - 2 Bunyodkor

22/08/19

Navbahor 0 - 1 Nasaf

Pakhtakor 2 - 0 Surkhon

== Semi-finals ==
The draw for the semi-finals was held on 2 September 2019.

26/09/19

AGMK 3 - 1 Bunyodkor

Pakhtakor 2 - 1 Nasaf

== Final ==
26/10/19

Pakhtakor 3 - 0 AGMK
