= Timur Kapadze =

Uzbek footballer and coach (born 1981)

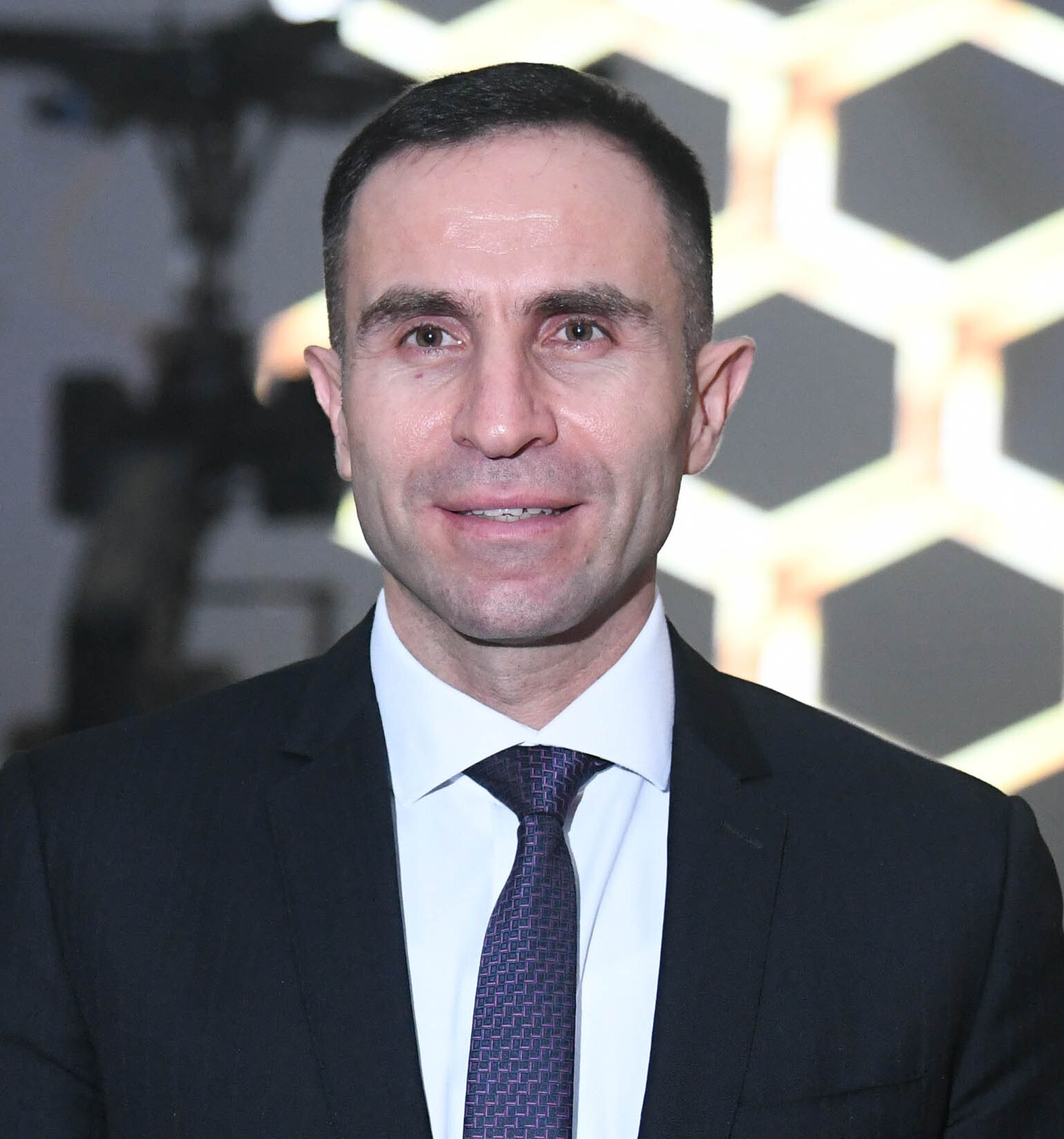
- Kapadze in 2022

Personal information
- Full name: Timur Takhirovich Kapadze
- Date of birth: 5 September 1981 (age 45)
- Place of birth: Fergana, Uzbek SSR, Soviet Union
- Height: 1.85 m (6 ft 1 in)
- Position: Midfielder

Team information
- Current team: Navbahor (head coach)

Senior career*
Years	Team	Apps	(Gls)
1998–2001	Neftchi Fergana	14	(2)
2002–2007	Pakhtakor	152	(28)
2008–2010	Bunyodkor	70	(11)
2011	Incheon United	28	(4)
2012	Al Sharjah	9	(0)
2012–2015	Aktobe	69	(10)
2015–2017	Lokomotiv Tashkent	80	(11)
Total		422	(66)

International career
2002–2015	Uzbekistan	119	(10)

Managerial career
- 2018: Uzbekistan (interim)
- 2021–2024: Olympic Tashkent
- 2022–2023: Uzbekistan
- 2022–2024: Uzbekistan U23
- 2024: Uzbekistan
- 2025: Uzbekistan
- 2025–: Navbahor
- * Club domestic league appearances and goals

Timur Takhirovich Kapadze (Uzbek: Temur Kapadze; Russian: Тимур Тахирович Кападзе; Georgian: თემურ კაპაძე; born 5 September 1981) is an Uzbek professional football coach and former player. He is the current head coach of Uzbekistan Super League club Navbahor Namangan. He guided the Uzbekistan national team as head coach to a historic first ever qualification to the 2026 FIFA World Cup.

== Early life ==
Of Turkish Meskhetian descent, he is the son of Takhir Kapadze — a football coach and was a pupil of Ferghan football, the city of his relatives. Takhir Kapadze came from a family of Georgian Turks who suffered forced deportation by the Soviet authorities to Central Asia during World War II.

== Playing career ==
=== Club ===
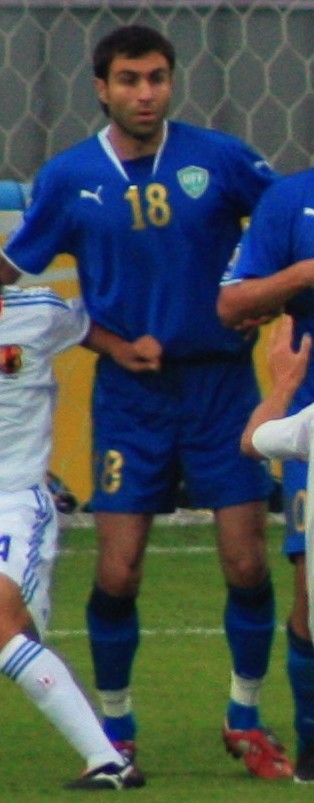
Kapadze with Uzbekistan in 2009

He began his professional career in 1998, as a member of Neftchi Ferghana. He played for Neftchi Ferghana to the end of 2001. During this time, the signal part of the club's 14 matches and managed to score two goals. Together with Neftchi Ferghana, he won the gold medals of the Uzbekistan Higher League in 2001, and in the season of 1998, 1999 and 2000 silver medals of the country championship.

In 2002, he moved to Pakhtakor from Tashkent. Together with the Tashkent club six consecutive seasons Uzbekistan champions, and also won six consecutive season Uzbekistan Cups. In 2007, Pakhtakor won the Commonwealth Champions Cup. In addition, in 2003 and 2004 he reached the AFC Champions League semi-finals with Pakhtakor. Until the end of 2007 he played for Pakhtakor, and was one of its leaders. In total, he played 152 matches in Pakhtakor and scored 28 goals.

In early 2008, he joined the new giant of Uzbekistan football — Bunyodkor. As player of Bunyodkor Kapadze also became one of the leaders of the team. In those years, Bunyodkor was able to attract the strongest players of his sworn rival - Pakhtakor, in addition to Timur Kapadze, players such as Server Djeparov, Ignatiy Nesterov and Anzur Ismailov, as well as a number of foreign legionaries, such as Brazilians Rivaldo and other Brazilians players. With Bunyodkor Kapadze three consecutive seasons they became the champion of Uzbekistan, twice won the Uzbekistan Cup, and once won silver medals of the Uzbekistan Cup. In addition, in 2008, he reached the semi-finals of the AFC Champions League. He played for Bunyodkor until the end of 2010, and during this time he played for the club 70 games and scored 11 goals.

In February 2011, Timur Kapadze moved to South Korean club Incheon United, where he played until the end of the season. He played 28 matches and scored four goals. In January 2012, he moved to UAE club Al Sharjah, where he played until June of the same year. During this time, he made nine appearance with the club.

In June 2012, he moved to Aktobe from Kazakhstan, and played for the club until the end of 2014. As part of Aktobe in 2013 became the champion of Kazakhstan, and in 2014 won the silver medal of the championship of Kazakhstan. In addition, in 2014, he won the Kazakhstan Super Cup.

In January 2015, he returned to Uzbekistan, and has signed a contract with Lokomotiv Tashkent. Together with the Lokomotiv Tashkent two consecutive seasons (2016 and 2017) became the champion of Uzbekistan, and in the season of 2015 won silver medals of the championship of Uzbekistan. Also in 2016 and 2017 won the Uzbekistan Cup, and in 2015 the Uzbekistan Super Cup.

He played for Lokomotiv Tashkent until the end of 2017. In the fall of 2017, he announced the end of his career as a football player at end of the 2017 season. During Kapadze's performance in Lokomotiv Tashkent, he was his captain. The farewell match of Timur Kapadze took place on 4 December 2017 in the final of the Uzbekistan Cup, in which Lokomotiv Tashkent and Bunyodkor met. The match ended with a score of 1–0 in favor of Lokomotiv Tashkent. The match was attended by a number of football and sports officials and specialists of Uzbekistan, in particular the President of the Uzbekistan Football Federation Umid Ahmadjanov, as well as the President of the AFC — Salman Bin Ibrahim Al-Khalifa.

At the end of his career as a football player, he announced his transition to coaching. On 15 February 2018 Kapadze was appointed interim head coach of the Uzbekistan national team. He held this position until Héctor Cúper has taken over as head coach in August 2018.

=== International ===
From 2002 to 2015, Timur Kapadze played for the Uzbekistan national team and had participated in four AFC Asian Cup, which is so far, the only Georgian-born player to have competed in international tournaments. His debut match for the national team played on 14 May 2002, in a friendly match against Slovakia. His first goal for the national team of Uzbekistan was scored on 17 November 2003, in the match against Tajikistan. In a short time, Timur Kapadze became one of the leaders of the national team.

He took part with the national team in four final tournaments of the AFC Asian Cup. In 2004, the tournament played four matches (Uzbekistan team reached the quarter-finals), in 2007 — played four matches and scored two goals (Uzbekistan team also reached the quarter-finals), in the Asian Cup in 2011 played six matches and became a semi-finalist of the tournament. In the Asian Cup 2015 played two matches, and the national team of Uzbekistan stopped at the quarter-finals.

Long was the best guard his team from 119 matches, before he was ahead of the Server Jeparov. In addition, Timur Kapadze was one of the vice-captains of the national team of Uzbekistan, and even in some matches went out on the field with a captain's armband.

== Managerial career ==
In January 2025, Kapadze was named as head coach of the Uzbekistan national team, following the departure of Srečko Katanec. Five months later, on 5 June 2025, he guided Uzbekistan to a historic first ever qualification to the 2026 FIFA World Cup. On 6 October 2025, it was announced that Kapadze would serve as an assistant heading into the World Cup, under manager Fabio Cannavaro. However, on 10 November 2025, Kapadze announced on his social media his resignation from the national team.

On 1 December 2025, Kapadze was appointed as the new manager of Navbahor Namangan.

== Managerial statistics ==
As of match played 8 September 2025

Managerial record by team and tenure
Team	From	To	Record				
Team	From	To	G	W	D	L	Win %
Uzbekistan (interim)	15 February 2018	30 June 2018	4	0	1	3	0.00
Uzbekistan U19	15 December 2019	31 December 2021	2	0	0	2	0.00
Olympic Tashkent	1 January 2021	31 July 2024	101	37	31	33	36.63
Uzbekistan	1 January 2022	8 October 2023	6	5	0	1	83.33
Uzbekistan U23	1 January 2022	31 July 2024	29	16	7	6	55.17
Uzbekistan	1 July 2024	31 July 2024	3	0	1	2	0.00
Uzbekistan	22 January 2025	5 October 2025	8	5	3	0	62.50
Total			153	63	43	47	41.18

== Honours ==
=== Player ===
Neftchi

- Uzbekistan Super League: 2001
- Uzbekistan Super League runners-up: 1998, 1999, 2000

Pakhtakor

- Uzbekistan Super League: 2002, 2003, 2004, 2005, 2006, 2007
- Uzbekistan Cup: 2002, 2003, 2004, 2005, 2006, 2007
- CIS cup: 2007

Bunyodkor

- Uzbekistan Super League: 2008, 2009, 2010
- Uzbekistan Cup: 2008, 2010

Aktobe

- Kazakhstan Premier League: 2013
- Kazakhstan Premier League runners-up: 2014
- Kazakhstan Super Cup: 2014

Lokomotiv

- Uzbekistan Super League: 2016, 2017
- Uzbekistan Cup: 2016, 2017
- Uzbekistan Super Cup: 2014

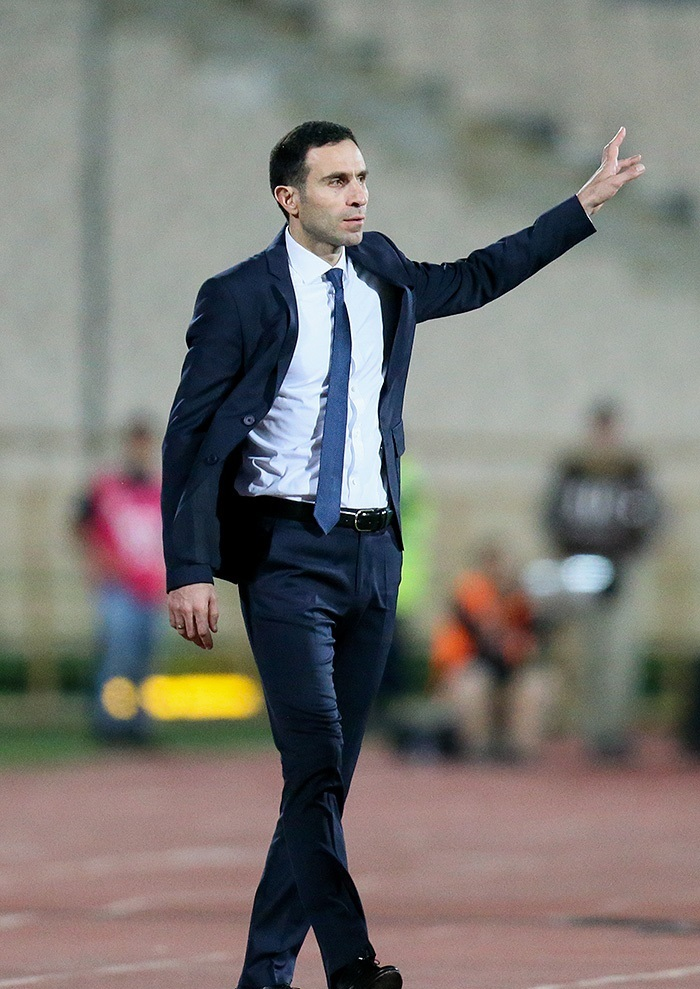
Kapadze in 2018

=== Manager ===
Uzbekistan

- CAFA Nations Cup: 2025

Uzbekistan U23

- AFC U-23 Asian Cup runners-up: 2022, 2024
- Asian Games bronze medalist: 2022

Individual

- Uzbekistan Football Coach of the Year: 2022, 2024, 2025

== Career statistics ==
=== International goals ===
Scores and results list Uzbekistan's goal tally first.

#	Date	Venue	Opponent	Score	Result	Competition
1.	17 November 2003	Rajamangala Stadium, Bangkok, Thailand	Tajikistan	3–0	4–1	2004 AFC Asian Cup qualification
2.	14 July 2007	National Stadium, Kuala Lumpur, Malaysia	Malaysia	2–0	5–0	2007 AFC Asian Cup
3.	18 July 2007	Shah Alam Stadium, Shah Alam, Malaysia	China	2–0	3–0	2007 AFC Asian Cup
4.	13 October 2007	Pakhtakor Markaziy Stadium, Tashkent, Uzbekistan	Chinese Taipei	3–0	9–0	World Cup qualifier
5.	26 March 2008	Pakhtakor Markaziy Stadium, Tashkent, Uzbekistan	Saudi Arabia	1–0	3–0	World Cup qualifier
6.	2 June 2008	National Stadium, Singapore, Singapore	Singapore	1–0	7–3	World Cup qualifier
7.	18 November 2009	National Stadium, Kuala Lumpur, Malaysia	Malaysia	3–1	3–1	2011 AFC Asian Cup qualification
8.	11 November 2011	Pakhtakor Markaziy Stadium, Tashkent, Uzbekistan	North Korea	1–0	1–0	2014 FIFA World Cup qualification
9.	13 August 2012	Amman International Stadium, Amman, Jordan	Jordan	1–0	1–0	Friendly
10.	14 October 2014	Dubai Club Stadium, Dubai, United Arab Emirates	United Arab Emirates	1–0	4–0	Friendly

== See also ==
- List of men's footballers with 100 or more international caps
