= Nesterovskoye, Vologodsky District, Vologda Oblast =

Nesterovskoye Нестеровское
- Village
- Location within Vologda Oblast Location within Russia
- Coordinates: 59°38′N 39°17′E
- Country: Russia
- Region: Vologda Oblast
- District: Vologodsky District
- Time zone: UTC+3:00

Nesterovskoye (Russian: Нестеровское) is a rural locality (a village) in Novlenskoye Rural Settlement, Vologodsky District, Vologda Oblast, Russia. The population was 21 as of 2002.

== Geography ==
Nesterovskoye is located 62 km northwest of Vologda (the district's administrative centre) by road. Kargachevo is the nearest rural locality.
