= Nesterovskoye, Cherepovetsky District, Vologda Oblast =

Nesterovskoye Нестеровское
- Village
- Location within Vologda Oblast Location within Russia
- Coordinates: 59°34′N 37°40′E
- Country: Russia
- Region: Vologda Oblast
- District: Cherepovetsky District
- Time zone: UTC+3:00

Nesterovskoye (Russian: Нестеровское) is a rural locality (a village) in Voskresenskoye Rural Settlement, Cherepovetsky District, Vologda Oblast, Russia. The population was 88 as of 2002.

== Geography ==
Nesterovskoye is located 65 km (40 mi) northwest of Cherepovets (the district's administrative centre) by road. Trofimovo is the nearest rural locality.
