= 2008 Uzbekistan Cup =

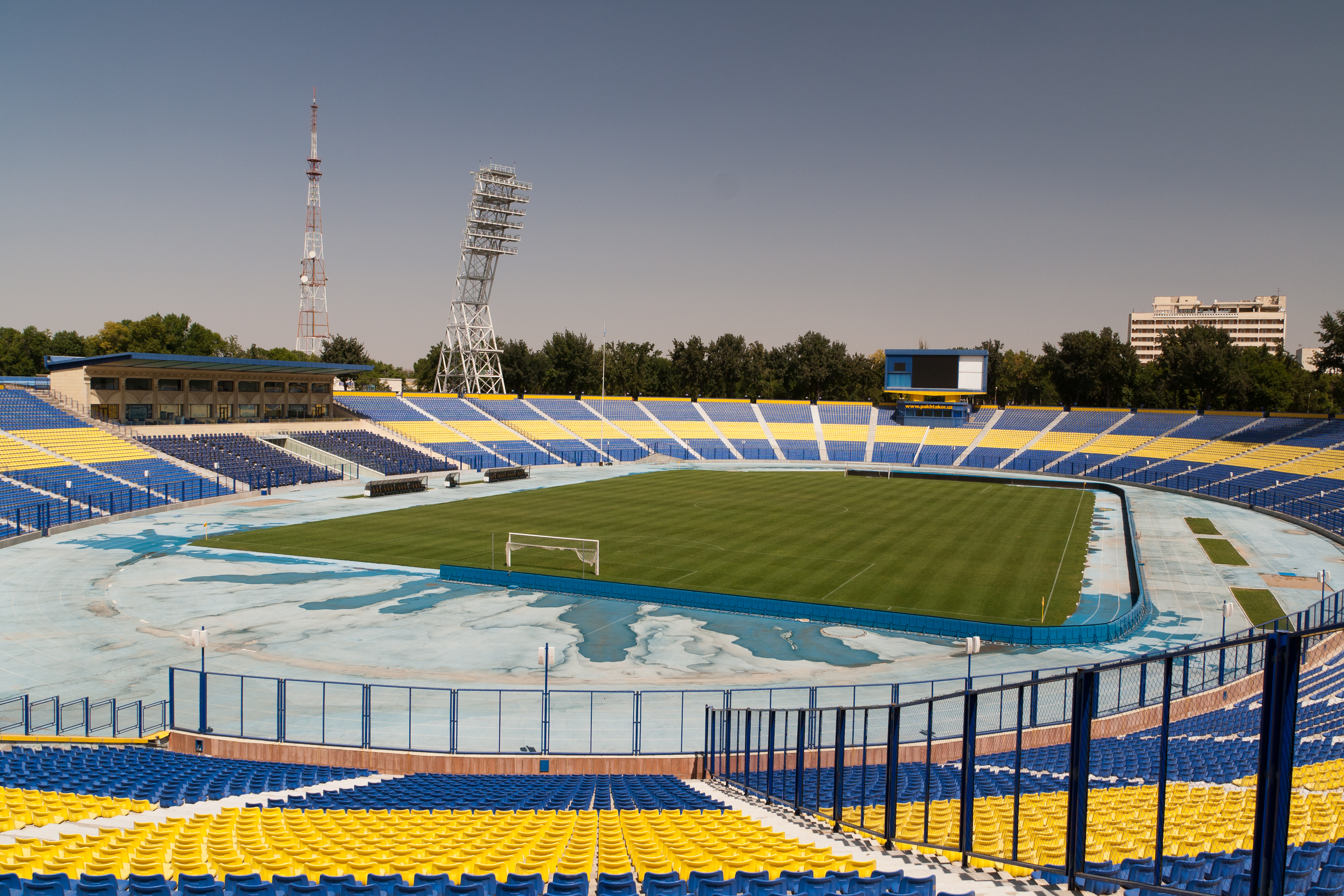

Tournament details
- Country: Uzbekistan
- Dates: March – November 2008
- Teams: 36

Final positions
- Champions: Quruvchi (1st title)
- Runners-up: Pakhtakor

Tournament statistics
- Matches played: 47
- Goals scored: 123 (2.62 per match)

2008 Uzbekistan Cup (Футбол бўйича 2008-йилги Ўзбекистон Кубоги) was a tournament organized by Uzbekistan Professional Football League. A total of 36 professional clubs participated.

Starting from the first stage, the competition was held in a knockout format. The final match took place on 31 October 2008 at the Pakhtakor Stadium in Tashkent, between "Bunyodkor" and "Pakhtakor". "Bunyodkor" won Uzbekistan Cup for the first time in its history.

== First Round ==
Pairs	Date	Note
Pairs	5 March	Note
Sokol (Uchquduq) — Dinamo-2 (Kattakurgan)	1:0	
Gʻallakor (Gʻallaaral) — Dustlik 2008	0:1	
Kimyogar (Chirchiq) — Olimjon Akbarov (Yaypan)	0:0	Penalties. 8:9
Dinamo 01 (Qarshi) — Shurchi-Lochin	4:0	
Xorazm (Urganch) — Jaykhun (Nukus)	0:2	
Shaykhantokhur (Tashkent) — Lokomotiv BFK (Tashkent)	+:-	
Sementchi (Quvasoy) — Oq Oltin (Shahrikhon)	-:+	
NBU-Asia (Tashkent) — Oqtepa (Tashkent)	+:-	

== Second Round ==
Pairs	Date	Note
Pairs	14 March	Note
Sokol (Uchquduq) — Lokomotiv (Tashkent)	1:1	Penalties. 5:4
Traktor (Tashkent) — Shurtan (Guzar)	0:3	
Oq Oltin (Shahrikhon) — Navbahor (Namangan)	1:4	
Doʻstlik 2008 — Nasaf (Karshi)	0:1	
Jayhun (Nukus) — Qizilqum (Zarafshon)	2:1	
Dinamo 01 (Qarshi) — Metallurg (Bekabad)	0:3	
Olimjon Akbarov (Yaypan) — AGMK (Olmaliq)	1:2	
Toʻpalang (Sariosiyo) — Samarkand-Dinamo FK	-:+	
Vobkent — Sogdiana (Jizzakh)	-:+	
	15 March	
Mashal-2 (Muborak) — Uz-DongJu (Andijan)	0:1	
Shaykhantokhur (Tashkent) — Bukhara	0:2	
	16 March	
NBU-Asia (Tashkent) — FC Andijon	0:0	Penalties. 3:4

== Knockout (host-guest) ==
Play-off Results
Round	Home team	1st leg	2nd leg	Away team
Round of 16	Mashʼal (Muborak)	3	0	Nasaf (Qarshi)
Round of 16	OKMK (Olmaliq)	2	0	FK Andijon
Round of 16	Metallurg (Bekobod)	1	0	FK Samarqand-Dinamo
Round of 16	Jayhun (Nukus)	0	0	Quruvchi (Tashkent)
Round of 16	Neftchi (Fergana)	4	1	Sokol (Uchquduq)
Round of 16	Shoʻrtan (Guzar)	3	4	Uz-Dong-Ju (Andijon)
Round of 16	Sogdiana (Jizzakh)	1	1	FK Bukhara
Round of 16	Navbahor (Namangan)	1	0	Pakhtakor (Tashkent)
Quarter-finals	Mashʼal (Muborak)	2	1	OKMK (Olmaliq)
Quarter-finals	FK Samarqand-Dinamo	0	0	Quruvchi (Tashkent)
Quarter-finals	Neftchi (Fergana)	1	2	Shoʻrtan (Guzar)
Quarter-finals	FK Bukhara	0	3	Pakhtakor (Tashkent)
Semi-finals	OKMK (Olmaliq)	1	0	Quruvchi (Tashkent)
Semi-finals	Neftchi (Fergana)	0	0	Pakhtakor (Tashkent)
Final	Bunyodkor (Tashkent)	3:1		Pakhtakor (Tashkent)
