= 2014 Uzbekistan Cup =

O'zbekiston Kubogi 2014
Tournament details
- Country: Uzbekistan
- Teams: 38

Final positions
- Champions: Lokomotiv Tashkent
- Runners-up: Bunyodkor

Tournament statistics
- Top goal scorer(s): Farrukh Shotursunov (5 goals)

The 2014 Uzbekistan Cup was the 22nd season of the annual Uzbek football Cup competition. The Cup draw was held on 21 February 2014 in Tashkent.

The competition started on 30 March 2014 and ended on 12 November 2014 with the final held at the Pakhtakor Markaziy Stadium in Tashkent. Bunyodkor, the defending champions 2013 and runners-up Lokomotiv Tashkent started from quarter-final stage of the Cup.

The cup winner is guaranteed a place in the 2015 AFC Champions League.

== Calendar ==
Round	Date	Fixtures	Clubs	Notes
First round	March 30, 2014	12	38 → 26	Clubs participating in First League gain entry.
Round of 32	April 18–20, 2014	12	26 → 14	Clubs participating in Uzbek League gain entry.
Round of 16	May 10, 2014; May 25–27, 2014	6	14 → 8	
Quarterfinals	June 10, 2014; June 10, 18, 2014	4	8 → 4	
Semifinals	June 26, 2014; June 26–27; July 1, 2014	2	4 → 2	
Final	November 12, 2014	1	2 → 1	

== First round ==
On 30 March 2014 Cup matches start with first round matches to define teams of Round of 32.

Home team	Score	Away team
FK Zaamin	1 - 1 (pen.1 - 3)	FK Guliston
Chust-Pakhtakor	2 - 1	Lokomotiv BFK
Hotira-79	2 - 0	FK Kosonsoy
Oqtepa	2 - 1	NBU Osiyo
Kokand 1912	2 - 0	Uz-Dong-Ju
Xorazm FK Urganch	4 - 2	FK Orol Nukus
Bunyodkor-2	7 - 2	Obod Toshkent
Sherdor	3 - 0	Ghallakor-Avtomobilchi
Registon	0 - 1	Shurtan Guzar
Pakhtakor-2	2 - 3	Istiqlol Toshkent
Mash'al Mubarek	2 - 0	FK Gijduvon
Alanga Koson	2 - 1	Spartak Bukhoro

== Bracket ==
Round of 32; April 18–20, 2014
FK Guliston	1
FK Dinamo Samarqand	2
Chust-Pakhtakor	0
Metallurg Bekabad	2
Hotira-79	1
FK Buxoro	0
Oqtepa	1
Mash'al Mubarek	0
Kokand 1912	0(4)
Neftchi Farg'ona	0(2)
Xorazm FK Urganch	0
Pakhtakor	4
Bunyodkor-2	0
Nasaf Qarshi	3
Sherdor	2(3)
FK Andijan	2(5)
Shurtan Guzar	1
Navbahor Namangan	2
Istiqlol Toshkent	2
Sogdiana Jizzakh	1
Mash'al Akademiya	1
Qizilqum Zarafshon	2
Alanga Koson	1
Olmaliq FK	3

Round of 16; May 10, 2014; May 25–27, 2014
FK Dinamo Samarqand	3	2	5
Metallurg Bekabad	3	0	3
Hotira-79	1	2	3
Oqtepa	2	2	4
Kokand 1912	0	0	0
Pakhtakor	0	4	4
Nasaf Qarshi	5	2	7
FK Andijan	0	1	1
Navbahor Namangan	1	2	3
Istiqlol Toshkent	0	1	1
Qizilqum Zarafshon	2	0	2
Olmaliq FK	1	6	7

Quarterfinals; June 10, 2014; June 18, 2014
Lokomotiv Tashkent	4	3	7
FK Dinamo Samarqand	3	0	3
Oqtepa	1	1	2
Pakhtakor	7	5	12
Nasaf Qarshi	1	3	4
Navbahor Namangan	0	1	1
Olmaliq FK	2	0	2
Bunyodkor	2	4	6

Semifinals; June 26–27, 2014; July 1, 2014
Lokomotiv Tashkent	1	2	3
Pakhtakor	0	2	2
Nasaf Qarshi	0	1	1
Bunyodkor	1	1	2

Final; November 12, 2014
Lokomotiv Tashkent	1
Bunyodkor	0

== Round of 32 ==
The one leg matches will be played on April 19–20.

Team 1	Score	Team 2
FK Guliston	1 - 2	FK Dinamo Samarqand
Chust-Pakhtakor	0 - 2	Metallurg Bekabad
Hotira-79	1 - 0	FK Buxoro
Oqtepa	1 - 0	Mash'al Mubarek
Kokand 1912	0 - 0 (pen. 4-2)	Neftchi Farg'ona
Xorazm FK Urganch	0 - 4	Pakhtakor
Bunyodkor-2	0 - 3	Nasaf Qarshi
Sherdor	2 - 2 (pen. 3-5)	FK Andijan
Shurtan Guzar	1 - 2	Navbahor Namangan
Istiqlol Toshkent	2 - 1	Sogdiana Jizzakh
Mash'al Akademiya	1 - 2	Qizilqum Zarafshon
Alanga Koson	1 - 3 (aet)	Olmaliq FK

== Round of 16 ==
The sixteen winners from the Round of 32 were drawn into eight two-legged ties.

Team 1	Agg.	Team 2	1st leg	2nd leg
FK Dinamo Samarqand	5−3	Metallurg Bekabad	3−3	2−0
Hotira-79	3−4	Oqtepa	1−2	2−2
Kokand 1912	0−4	Pakhtakor	0−0	0−4
Nasaf Qarshi	7−1	FK Andijan	5−0	2−1
Navbahor Namangan	3−1	Istiqlol Tashkent	1−0	2−1
Qizilqum Zarafshon	2−7	Olmaliq FK	2−1	0−6

== Quarterfinal ==
Team 1	Agg.	Team 2	1st leg	2nd leg
FK Dinamo Samarqand	3−7	Lokomotiv Tashkent	3−4	0−3
Oqtepa	2−12	Pakhtakor	1−7	1−5
Navbahor Namangan	1−4	Nasaf Qarshi	0−1	1−3
Bunyodkor	6−2	Olmaliq FK	2−2	4−0

== Semifinal ==
Team 1	Agg.	Team 2	1st leg	2nd leg
Lokomotiv Tashkent	3−2	Pakhtakor	1−0	2−2
Bunyodkor	2−1	Nasaf Qarshi	1−0	1−1

== Final ==
Team 1	Score	Team 2
Lokomotiv Tashkent	1−0	Bunyodkor

== Goalscorers ==
#	Scorer	Goals (Pen.)	Team
1	(Uzbekistan) Farrukh Shotursunov	5 (2)	FK Samarqand-Dinamo
2	(Uzbekistan) Sardor Rashidov	4 (0)	Bunyodkor
2	(Uzbekistan) Sherzod Khakimov	4 (1)	Olmaliq FK
4	(Uzbekistan) Vokhid Shodiev	3 (0)	Bunyodkor
4	(Turkmenistan) Artur Gevorkyan	3 (0)	Nasaf Qarshi
4	(Uzbekistan) Stanislav Andreev	3 (0)	Pakhtakor
4	(Uzbekistan) Igor Sergeev	3 (0)	Pakhtakor
4	(Uzbekistan) Anvar Soliev	3 (1)	Pakhtakor
4	(Uzbekistan) Farhod Tadjiyev	3 (0)	Lokomotiv Tashkent

Last updated: 1 July 2014
Source: UzPFL
