= Islom Tukhtakhujaev =

Uzbekistani footballer

Islom Tukhtahujaev
Personal information
- Full name: Islom Tuhtakhojaev
- Date of birth: 30 October 1989 (age 37)
- Place of birth: Fergana, Uzbek SSR, Soviet Union
- Height: 1.80 m (5 ft 11 in)
- Position: Defender

Team information
- Current team: FC Andijon
- Number: 20

Senior career*
Years	Team	Apps	(Gls)
2009–2012	Neftchi Farg'ona	59	(3)
2012–2019	Lokomotiv Tashkent	191	(19)
2020	Liaoning Shenyang Urban	12	(2)
2021–2022	Qizilqum	38	(0)
2022–2023	Al-Gharafa	27	(1)
2023-2025	FC AGMK	51	(4)
2026-	FC Andijon	9	(0)

International career^{‡}
- Uzbekistan U-19
- Uzbekistan U-20
2009–2021	Uzbekistan	73	(2)
- * Club domestic league appearances and goals as of 29 July 2026 ‡ National team caps and goals as of 15 June 2021

Islom Tukhtahujaev (Uzbek: Islom Toʻxtaxoʻjayev, Uzbek Cyrillic: Ислом Тўхтахўжаев; born 30 October 1989) is an Uzbek footballer who plays as a defender for FC Andijon.

== Career ==
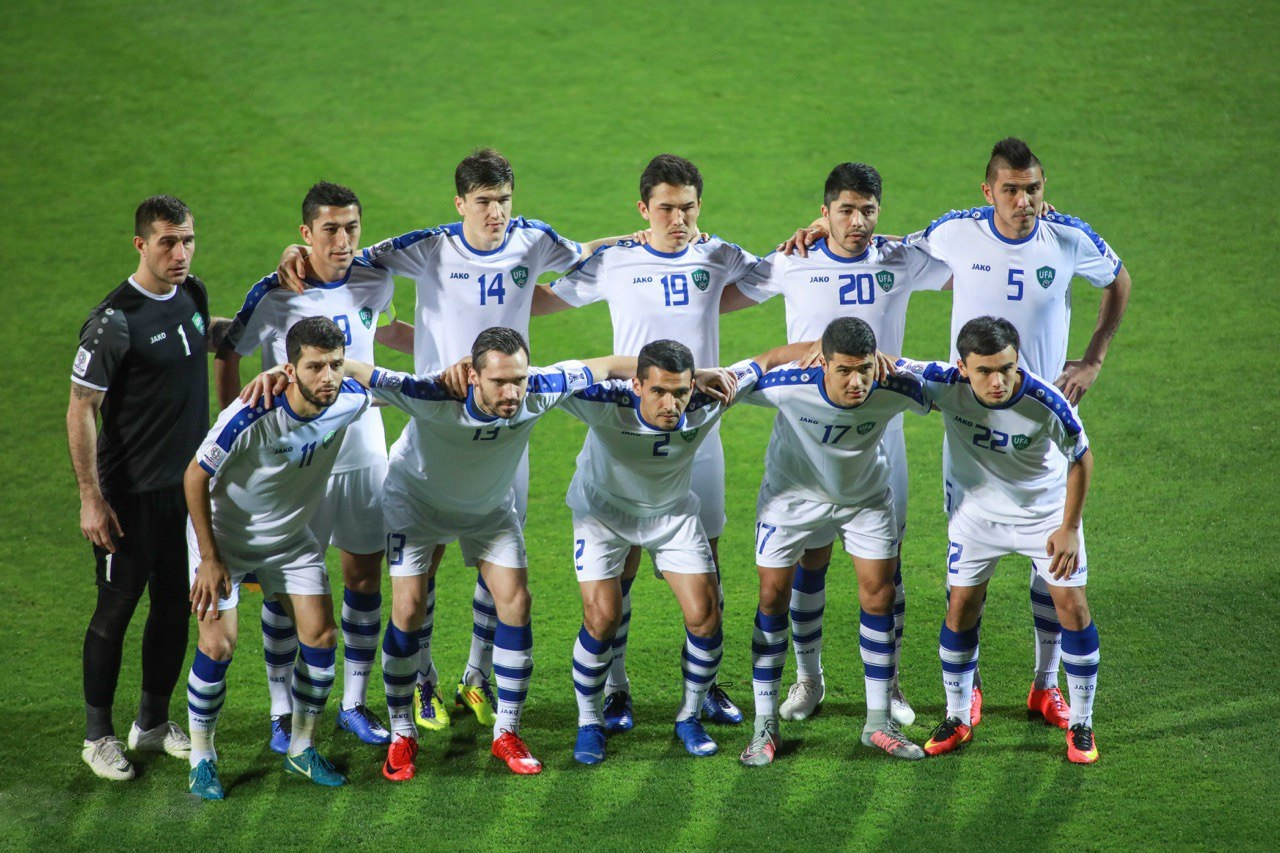
Tukhtakhujaev (№20) at 2019 Asian Cup

Tukhtahujaev was born in Fergana. He is an Uzbek youth international, having represented his country at every level from Under-19 to Under-20. He was also capped for the senior national team.

== Career statistics ==
=== Club ===
As of 4 December 2023.

Club	Season	League			National Cup		Continental		Other		Total	
Club	Season	Division	Apps	Goals	Apps	Goals	Apps	Goals	Apps	Goals	Apps	Goals
Neftchi Farg'ona	2009	Uzbek League	20	1	0	0	0	0	-		20	1
Neftchi Farg'ona	2010	Uzbek League	22	0	2	0	-		-		24	0
Neftchi Farg'ona	2011	Uzbek League	17	2	3	0	-		-		20	2
Neftchi Farg'ona	Total		59	3	5	0	0	0	0	0	64	3
Lokomotiv Tashkent	2012	Uzbek League	23	3	4	0	-		-		27	3
Lokomotiv Tashkent	2013	Uzbek League	26	5	4	0	1	0	-		31	5
Lokomotiv Tashkent	2014	Uzbek League	23	1	5	0	1	0	0	0	29	1
Lokomotiv Tashkent	2015	Uzbek League	24	2	6	0	4	0	1	0	35	2
Lokomotiv Tashkent	2016	Uzbek League	21	2	3	0	10	1	-		34	3
Lokomotiv Tashkent	2017	Uzbek League	22	1	4	0	6	0	-		32	1
Lokomotiv Tashkent	2018	Uzbekistan Super League	28	0	2	1	6	1	-		36	2
Lokomotiv Tashkent	2019	Uzbekistan Super League	24	5	1	0	5	1	1	0	31	6
Lokomotiv Tashkent	Total		191	19	29	1	33	3	2	0	255	23
Liaoning Shenyang Urban	2020	China League One	8	0	0	0	-		-		8	0
Qizilqum	2021	Uzbekistan Super League	25	0	4	1	-		-		29	1
Qizilqum	2022	Uzbekistan Super League	13	0	3	0	-		-		16	0
Qizilqum	Total		38	0	7	1	0	0	0	0	45	1
Al-Gharafa	2022–23	Qatar Stars League	21	1	2	0	-		4	0	27	1
FC AGMK	2023	Uzbekistan Super League	10	0	3	0	6	0	-		19	0
Career total			327	23	46	2	39	3	6	0	418	28

=== International ===
Scores and results list Uzbekistan's goal tally first.

No.	Date	Venue	Opponent	Score	Result	Competition
1.	31 March 2015	Ajinomoto Stadium, Chōfu, Japan	Japan	1–3	1–5	Friendly
2.	10 October 2019	Pakhtakor Central Stadium, Tashkent, Uzbekistan	Yemen	4–0	5–0	2022 FIFA World Cup qualification

== Honours ==
Lokomotiv

- Uzbek League: 2016, 2017
- Uzbek Cup: 2014, 2016, 2017
- Uzbekistan Super Cup: 2015
