= 2009 Uzbekistan Cup =

Tournament details
- Country: Uzbekistan
- Dates: March – August 2009

Final positions
- Champions: Pakhtakor (1st title)
- Runners-up: Bunyodkor

Tournament statistics
- Matches played: 36
- Goals scored: 107 (2.97 per match)

2009 Uzbekistan Cup (in Uzbek: Футбол бўйича 2009-йилги Ўзбекистон Кубоги) was a tournament organized by Uzbekistan Professional Football League.

The final was between Pakhtakor and Bunyodkor. Pakhtakor won Uzbekistan Cup, becoming the club's 10th cup winner in its history.

== First Round ==
Fixtures	Date	Note
Fixtures	5 March	Note
Shurchi-Lochin – Nasaf-2 (Qarshi)	3:2	
Spartak (Tashkent) – NBU-Osiyo	1:2	
Jaykhun (Nukus) – Mash’al-Akademiya (Mubarek)	1:3	
Neftchi (Jarqoʻrgʻon) – Dinamo 01 (Qarshi)	0:1	
Gʻallakor (Gʻallaaral) – Turan (Juma)	+:-	
Shayxontohur (Tashkent) – Kimyogar (Chirchiq)	+:-	
Dinamo-2 (Kattakurgan) – Zarafshon (Navoi)	-:+	

== Second Round ==
Pairs	Date	Note
Pairs	12 March	Note
Shoʻrchi-Lochin – Qizilqum (Zarafshan)	1:2	
NBU-Osiyo (Tashkent) – Mash’al (Muborak)	0:2	
Mexnat (Yaypan) – Dinamo (Samarkand)	1:2	
Dinamo 01 (Qarshi) – Lokomotiv (Tashkent)	2:2	Penalties. 4:3
Oqtepa (Tashkent) – Khorezm (Urgench)	-:+	
	13 March	
Doʻstlik – Metallurg (Bekabad)	1:1	Penalties. 5:6
Gʻallakor (Gʻallaaral) – Sogdiana (Jizzakh)	1:2	
Shayxontoxur (Tashkent) – Bukhara	0:5	
Bunyodkor-Qoʻqon 1912 – Navbahor (Namangan)	0:2	
Zarafshan (Navoi) – Shurtan (Guzar)	0:5	
Mash’al Academy (Muborak) – Nasaf (Qarshi)	1:2	
Uz-Dong-Ju (Andijan) – FC Andijan	-:+	

== Round of 16 ==
Pairings	Date	Note
Pairings	18 March	Note
Qizilqum (Zarafshan) – Sogdiana (Jizzakh)	1:0	
Bukhara – Mash’al (Muborak)	4:3	
Almalyk – Nasaf (Qarshi)	1:1	Penalties. 6:7
Khorezm (Urgench) – Dinamo (Samarkand)	4:1	
Shurtan (Guzar) – Andijan	1:1	Penalties. 4:3
	27 March	
Dinamo 01 (Qarshi) – Bunyodkor (Tashkent)	0:2	
	5 June	
Neftchi (Fergana) – Metallurg (Bekabad)	5:0	
	11 June	
Navbahor (Namangan) – Pakhtakor (Tashkent)	0:3	

== Quarter-finals ==
Pairings	Date	Note
Pairings	10 June	Note
Bunyodkor (Tashkent) – Shurtan (Guzar)	2:1	
	16 June	
Nasaf (Qarshi) – Khorezm (Urgench)	4:1	
Neftchi (Fergana) – Qizilqum (Zarafshan)	3:0	
	7 July	
Pakhtakor (Tashkent) – Bukhara	3:0	

== Semi-finals ==
Pairings	1st Leg	2nd Leg
Pairings	26 July	30 July
Bunyodkor (Tashkent) – Nasaf (Qarshi)	3:0	2:0
Pakhtakor (Tashkent) – Neftchi (Fergana)	4:1	2:3
