= 2017 Uzbekistan Cup =

2017 O'zbekiston Kubogi
Tournament details
- Country: Uzbekistan

Final positions
- Champions: Lokomotiv Tashkent
- Runners-up: Bunyodkor

The 2017 Uzbekistan Cup was the 25th season of the annual Uzbek football Cup competition.

The competition started on 19 March 2017, and ended in November 2017.

The cup winner is guaranteed a place in the 2018 AFC Champions League.

== Matches ==
=== First round ===
19 March 2017	G'allakor-Barsa	1–3	Neftchi Jarkurgan

19 March 2017	Istiklol Fergana	5–4	Yangiyer

=== Second round ===
24 March 2017	Uz Dong Joo	0–1	Bukhoro

24 March 2017	Lokomotiv BFK	0–7	Nasaf Qarshi

24 March 2017	Yozyovon Lochinlari	6–0	Obod
11:00

24 March 2017	FK Zaamin	1–2	Dinamo Samarqand
11:00

24 March 2017	Hotira Namangan	1–2	Shurtan Guzar
11:00

25 March 2017	Sementchi	0–1	Olmaliq
11:00

25 March 2017	NBU Osiyo	0–3	Metallurg Bekabad
11:00

25 March 2017	Istiqlol Fergana	0–5	Mash'al Mubarek
11:00

25 March 2017	FK Naryn	1–2	Qizilqum Zarafshon
11:00

25 March 2017	Andijon	1–1 (a.e.t.) (3–5 p)	Neftchi Fergana
11:00

25 March 2017	Neftchi Jarkurgan	0–2	Kokand 1912
12:00

25 March 2017	Navbahor Namangan	5–0	Xorazm FK Urganch
12:00

26 March 2017	Sogdiana	4–3	Orol Nukus

10 April 2017	Nurafshon	0–0 (a.e.t.) (3–5 p)	Pakhtakor

=== Third round ===
21 May 2017	Yozyovon	0–4	Mash'al Mubarek

31 May 2017	Mash'al Mubarek	5–0	Yozyovon

22 May 2017	Kokand 1912	2–0	Metallurg Bekabad

30 May 2017	Metallurg Bekabad	3–2	Kokand 1912

22 May 2017	Dinamo Samarqand	1–1	Olmaliq

31 May 2017	Olmaliq	2–2	Dinamo Samarqand

22 May 2017	Buxoro	1–1	Sogdiana

30 May 2017	Sogdiana	0–3	Buxoro

22 May 2017	Shurtan	0–2	Bunyodkor

31 May 2017	Bunyodkor	3–0	Shurtan

22 May 2017	Pakhtakor	0–3	Nasaf Qarshi

30 May 2017	Nasaf Qarshi	1–0	Pakhtakor

23 May 2017	Neftchi Fergana	1–0	Navbahor Namangan

31 May 2017	Navbahor Namangan	2–1	Neftchi Fergana

23 May 2017	Lokomotiv Tashkent	5–0	Qizilqum Zarafshon

31 May 2017	Qizilqum Zarafshon	1–1	Lokomotiv Tashkent

=== Quarter-finals ===
30 June 2017	Nasaf Qarshi	4–1	Kokand 1912

28 July 2017	Kokand 1912	2–2	Nasaf Qarshi

30 June 2017	Dinamo Samarqand	0–1	Mash'al Mubarek

4 July 2017	Mash'al Mubarek	1–2	Dinamo Samarqand

30 June 2017	Neftchi Fergana	1–2	Bunyodkor

27 July 2017	Bunyodkor	3–1	Neftchi Fergana

4 July 2017	Buxoro	0–0	Lokomotiv Tashkent

28 July 2017	Lokomotiv Tashkent	3–0 (a.e.t.)	Buxoro

=== Semi-finals ===
==== 1st Legs ====
31 July 2017	Bunyodkor	0–0	Dinamo Samarqand
18:00

1 August 2017	Lokomotiv	3–1	Nasaf
19:30

==== 2nd Legs ====
6 October 2017	Dinamo Samarqand	0–2	Bunyodkor

Bunyodkor won 2–0 on aggregate

7 October 2017	Nasaf	1–0	Lokomotiv

Lokomotiv won 3–2 on aggregate

=== Final ===
4 December 2017	Lokomotiv	1–0	Bunyodkor	Stadion Bunyodkor, Tashkent
				Referee: Mohammed Abdulla Hassan Mohamed (UAE)

== See also ==
- 2017 Uzbek League
