= Zokhir Pirimov =

Uzbekistani footballer

Personal information
- Full name: Zokhir Dilshodovich Pirimov
- Date of birth: 6 March 1990 (age 36)
- Place of birth: Urgut, Uzbek SSR, Soviet Union
- Height: 1.70 m (5 ft 7 in)
- Position: Midfielder

Team information
- Current team: Surkhon
- Number: 11

Senior career*
Years	Team	Apps	(Gls)
2007	Qizilqum		
2008–2016	Olmaliq		
2017	Buxoro	9	(0)
2018	Navbahor	12	(1)
2018–2019	AGMK	27	(2)
2020	Buxoro	23	(1)
2021–	Surkhon	10	(0)

International career
- Uzbekistan U20
2009	Uzbekistan	2	(0)
- * Club domestic league appearances and goals as of 19:54, 20 June 2021 (UTC)

Zokhir Pirimov (born 6 March 1990) is an Uzbekistani football midfielder who currently plays for Surkhon Termez. He was a squad member for the 2009 FIFA U-20 World Cup.
