= Ignatiy Nesterov =

Uzbekistani footballer

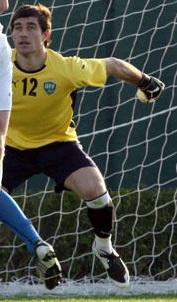
- Nesterov with Uzbekistan in 2009

Personal information
- Full name: Ignatius Mikhailovich Nesterov
- Date of birth: 20 June 1983 (age 43)
- Place of birth: Samarkand, Uzbek SSR, Soviet Union
- Height: 1.82 m (6 ft 0 in)
- Position: Goalkeeper

Senior career*
Years	Team	Apps	(Gls)
2001–2004	Dinamo Samarkand	24	(0)
2002–2009	Pakhtakor	192	(0)
2009–2014	Bunyodkor	154	(0)
2014–2019	Lokomotiv	160	(0)
2019	Ohod	2	(0)
2019–2020	Lokomotiv	13	(0)
2020–2022	Qizilqum	62	(0)

International career^{‡}
2002–2019	Uzbekistan	106	(0)
- * Club domestic league appearances and goals as of 11 November 2022 ‡ National team caps and goals as of 25 January 2019

Ignatiy Mikhailovich Nesterov (Uzbek: Ignatiy Mixaylovich Nesterov, Russian: Игнатий Михайлович Нестеров) (born 20 June 1983, in Samarkand) is an Uzbek football goalkeeper of Russian origin who plays for Lokomotiv Tashkent.

Apart from a short-term spell at Saudi Arabian club Ohod, Nesterov has spent his entire footballing career in Uzbekistan. The most-decorated Uzbek player at club level, he won ten Uzbekistan Super Leagues and ten Uzbek Cups. For the Uzbek national team, he has participated in five Asian Cups (2004, 2007, 2011, 2015 and 2019).

== Club career ==
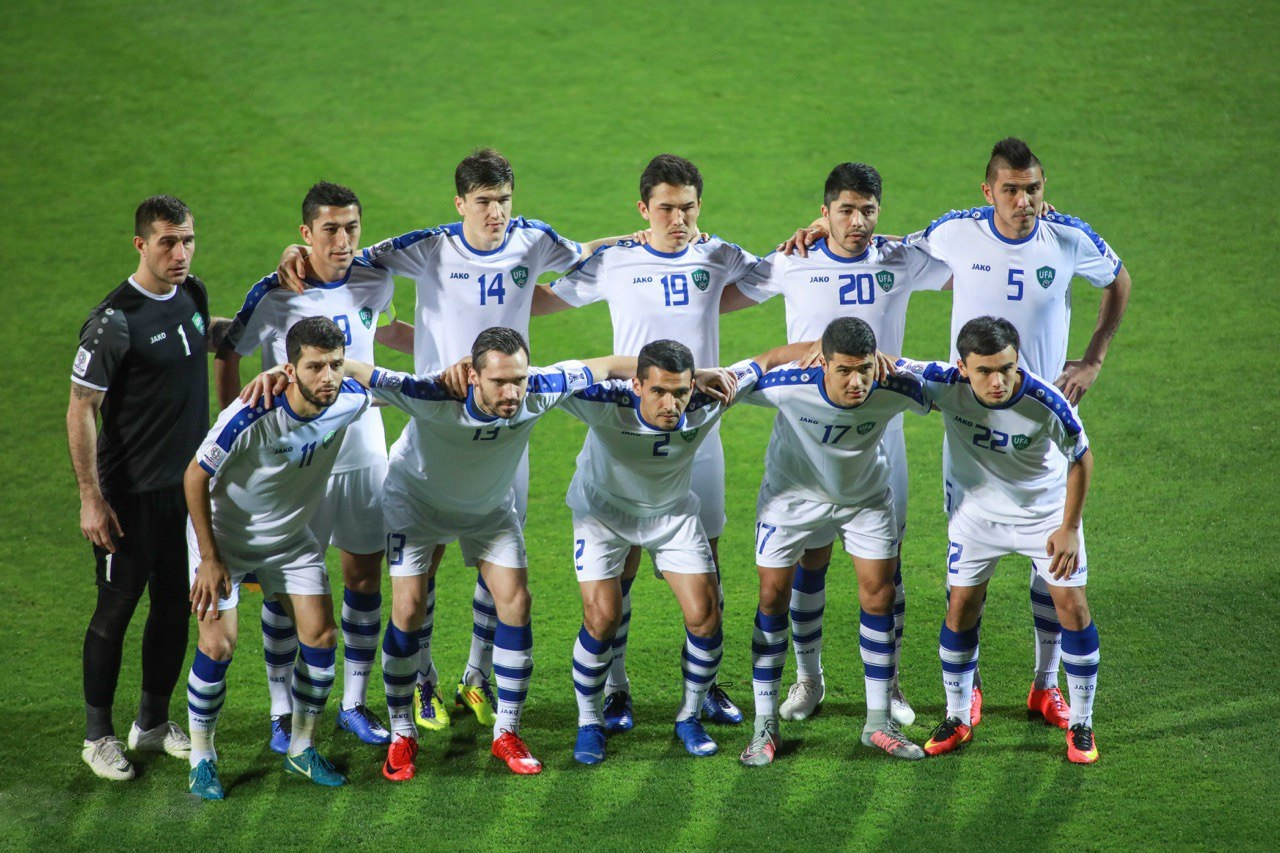
Ignatiy Nesterov (№1) at 2019 Asian Cup

=== Early career ===
Before signing for Pakhtakor, Nesterov played for FK Samarqand-Dinamo.

=== Pakhtakor ===
He played for Pakhtakor from 2002 to 2009. By playing for Pakhtakor Nesterov he became the first-choice goalkeeper of the national team.

=== Bunyodkor ===
In July 2009 Nesterov moved to Bunyodkor, signing a 3.5 years contract with the club.

=== Lokomotiv ===
On 10 December 2013 the press service of Lokomotiv announced a contract signing with Nesterov. The terms of the deal were not disclosed. He was linked with Asian giants Persepolis of Iran in January 2016.

== Honours ==
Pakhtakor

- Uzbek League: 2002, 2003, 2004, 2005, 2006, 2007
- Uzbek Cup: 2002, 2003, 2004, 2005, 2006, 2007
- CIS cup: 2007

Bunyodkor

- Uzbek League: 2009, 2010, 2011, 2013
- Uzbek Cup: 2010, 2012, 2013

Lokomotiv

- Uzbek League runners-up: 2014
- Uzbek Cup: 2014

Uzbekistan U21

- Afro-Asian Games gold medal: 2003

== Personal life ==
Nesterov is of Russian ancestry and a devout Orthodox Christian; he has multiple tattoos referring to his Christian faith. He is bilingual, speaking Russian and Uzbek.

== See also ==
- List of footballers with 100 or more caps
