= Jasur Hasanov (footballer, born 1983) =

Uzbekistani footballer

Personal information
- Full name: Jasur Orziqulovich Hasanov
- Date of birth: 2 August 1983 (age 43)
- Place of birth: Jizzakh, Soviet Union
- Height: 1.69 m (5 ft 7 in)
- Position: Attacking midfielder

Team information
- Current team: FC Bukhara
- Number: 1

Senior career*
Years	Team	Apps	(Gls)
1999–2002	Sogdiana Jizzakh	57	(2)
2003–2005	Navbahor	47	(7)
2005–2007	Mash'al Mubarek	40	(4)
2007–2012	Bunyodkor	94	(10)
2010–2011	→ Lekhwiya (loan)	27	(5)
2011–2012	→ Qatar SC (loan)	11	(0)
2012	Emirates Club	9	(1)
2012–2014	Bunyodkor	32	(4)
2014–2016	Lokomotiv Tashkent	53	(7)
2016–2017	Qizilqum Zarafshon	29	(1)
2017–2018	Nasaf	25	(1)
2018–2019	AGMK	25	(3)
2019–2024	Sogdiana Jizzakh	120	(16)
2024-	FC Bukhara	19	(0)

International career^{‡}
2007–2016	Uzbekistan	53	(2)
- * Club domestic league appearances and goals as of 11 September 2024 ‡ National team caps and goals as of 8 April 2016

Jasur Orziqulovich Hasanov (Uzbek Cyrillic: Жасур Ҳасанов; born 2 August 1983) is an Uzbekistani professional footballer who plays as an attacking midfielder for Sogdiana Jizzakh. He has been a regular starter for the Uzbekistan national team.

== Club career ==
Hasanov started his footballing career in Sogdiana Jizzakh, a football club based in his hometown of Jizzakh, at the age of 16.

=== Bunyodkor ===
Hasanov was signed by eventual Uzbek League champions Bunyodkor in 2007. He soon became a core member of the team, leading Bunyodkor to their first ever Uzbek League championship in 2008, and again in 2009 and 2010.

In 2009, he was awarded third place in the Uzbekistan Footballer of the Year award, losing out to teammate Rivaldo, and Odil Ahmedov.

=== Lekhwiya ===
In 2010, Hasanov was loaned to Qatari club Lekhwiya. Hasanov helped them win their first ever championship in Qatar Stars League within the first year of the club's promotion to the 1st league.

On 7 July 2011, it was announced that Hasanov moved back to Bunyodkor after his loan with Lekhwiya expired.

=== Qatar SC ===
On 24 August 2011, it was again confirmed to the media that Hasanov was loaned to another Qatari club, Qatar SC, on a one-year contract. He is set to replace Iraqi national Qusay Munir. Qatar SC chairman Nasser Al Thani expressed happiness with the deal. "We're very happy to sign Hasanov, who put up a series of fine, consistent performances during last season with Lekhwiya. He's a top performer with the Uzbek national team as well. We're sure he'll be a great success at Qatar SC," said the official. He left the club after failing to claim a consistent starting eleven spot in the team.

== International goals ==
#	Date	Venue	Opponent	Score	Result	Competition
1	2 January 2011	Sharjah	Jordan	2–2	Draw	Friendly
2	8 June 2012	Camille Chamoun Sports City Stadium, Beirut	Lebanon	1–1	Draw	2014 FIFA World Cup qualification

== Honours ==
Bunyodkor

- Uzbek League: 2008, 2009, 2010
- Uzbek Cup: 2008

Lekhwiya

- Qatari League: 2010–11

Uzbekistan

- AFC Asian Cup: 2007 (quarter-finals); 2011 (4th place)

Individual

- AFC Cup top goalscorer: 2022
