= Pakhtakor Central Stadium =

Football stadium in Tashkent, Uzbekistan

- Uzbek: Paxtakor markaziy stadioni
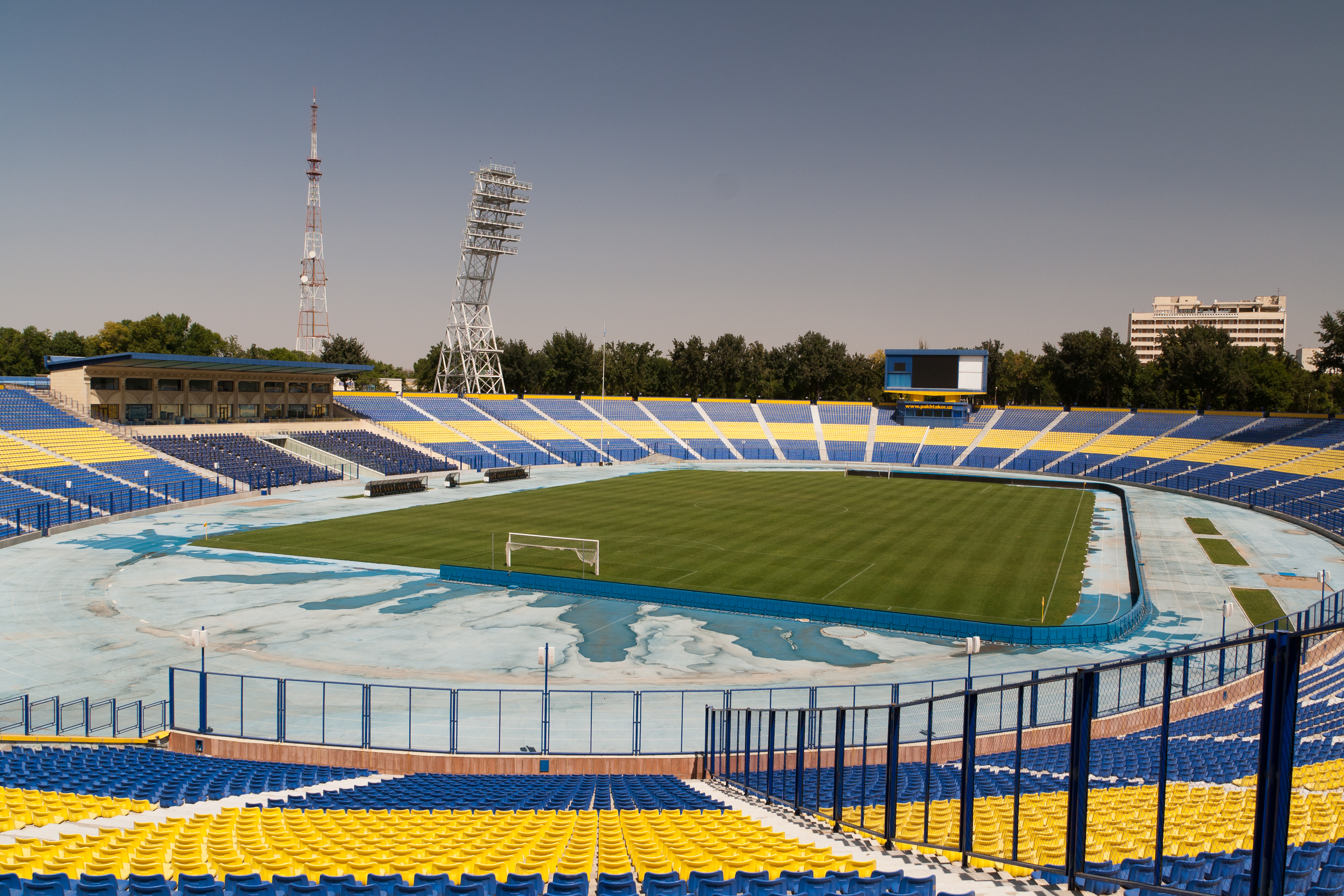
- Interactive map of Pakhtakor Central Stadium
- Location: Shaykhantahur District of Tashkent, Uzbekistan
- Coordinates: 41°18′55.88″N 69°15′36.88″E
- Owner: Pakhtakor FC
- Operator: Pakhtakor FC
- Capacity: 60,000 (1956–1996); 55,000 (1996–2008); 35,000 (2008–present)
- Surface: Grass
- Record attendance: More 60,000 (in the USSR)
- Field size: 112 m × 72 m (122 yd × 79 yd)
- Public transit: Pakhtakor Metro station Pakhatkor Stadium Bus station

Construction
- Built: 1954–1956
- Opened: 11 August 1956; 70 years ago
- Renovated: 1960, 1980, 1996, 2008, 2012
- Architect: Mitkhat Bulatov
- General contractor: USSR Ministry of Construction

Tenants
- Pakhtakor FC (1956–present); Uzbekistan national football team (1992–present); Uzbekistan U-16, U-17, U-20, U-23 and Women national teams

The Pakhtakor Central Stadium (Uzbek: Paxtakor markaziy stadioni) is a multi-purpose stadium in Tashkent, Uzbekistan. It is one of the main stadiums in Uzbekistan, located in the center of Tashkent, in Shaykhantahur District. The stadium has a capacity of 35,000 fans. It is the home stadium of Pakhtakor FC. In addition, the Uzbekistan national football team played some matches at the stadium.

From 1992 until 2012, Pakhtakor Stadium was the main stadium, where the Uzbekistan national football team played home games. Since 2013, the main home stadium for the Uzbekistan national team has been Milliy Stadium.

== History ==
Construction of the stadium started in 1954 and was completed in 1956. The architect of the stadium is Mitkhat Saghatdinovich Bulatov. Initially, the stadium accommodated 60,000 spectators, but over time, after a series of renovations in 1960, 1980, 1996, 2008 and 2012, the capacity of the stadium decreased to the current — 35,000.

The first official match at the stadium was played on August 20, 1956 between the Pakhtakor and Dinamo Tbilisi football clubs, as part of the USSR Higher League. The first official international match was played on September 19 of the same year between Pakhtakor and Albanian Dinamo Tirana, which was also won by the Tashkent team. In Soviet times, the Pakhtakor Stadium was one of the most visited stadiums of the USSR Higher League (more than 60,000 fans in every match). Teams like the Zenit Saint Petersburg, Spartak Moscow, Dinamo Moscow, CSKA Moscow, Lokomotiv Moscow, Torpedo Moscow, Shakhtar Donetsk, Dinamo Kyiv, Dnipro, Dinamo Minsk and other came to Tashkent.

Until 2012, Pakhtakor was the main stadium where the national football team of Uzbekistan played home games. After the opening of the new Bunyodkor Stadium (now Milliy Stadium), the national team of Uzbekistan moved to a new stadium and now played some matches at the Pakhtakor Stadium. Also at the stadium are home matches of youth (U-17), youth (U-20), youth (U-23) and Women football team of Uzbekistan. The stadium also hosts various other sporting events and tournaments, concerts and entertainment events.

Many times the demolition of the stadium and the construction of a new modern stadium in its place were announced. But the stadium is worth it. In 2017, the new leadership of Pakhtakor announced the construction of a new stadium, but so far construction has not begun, and the stadium is working.

== Gallery ==
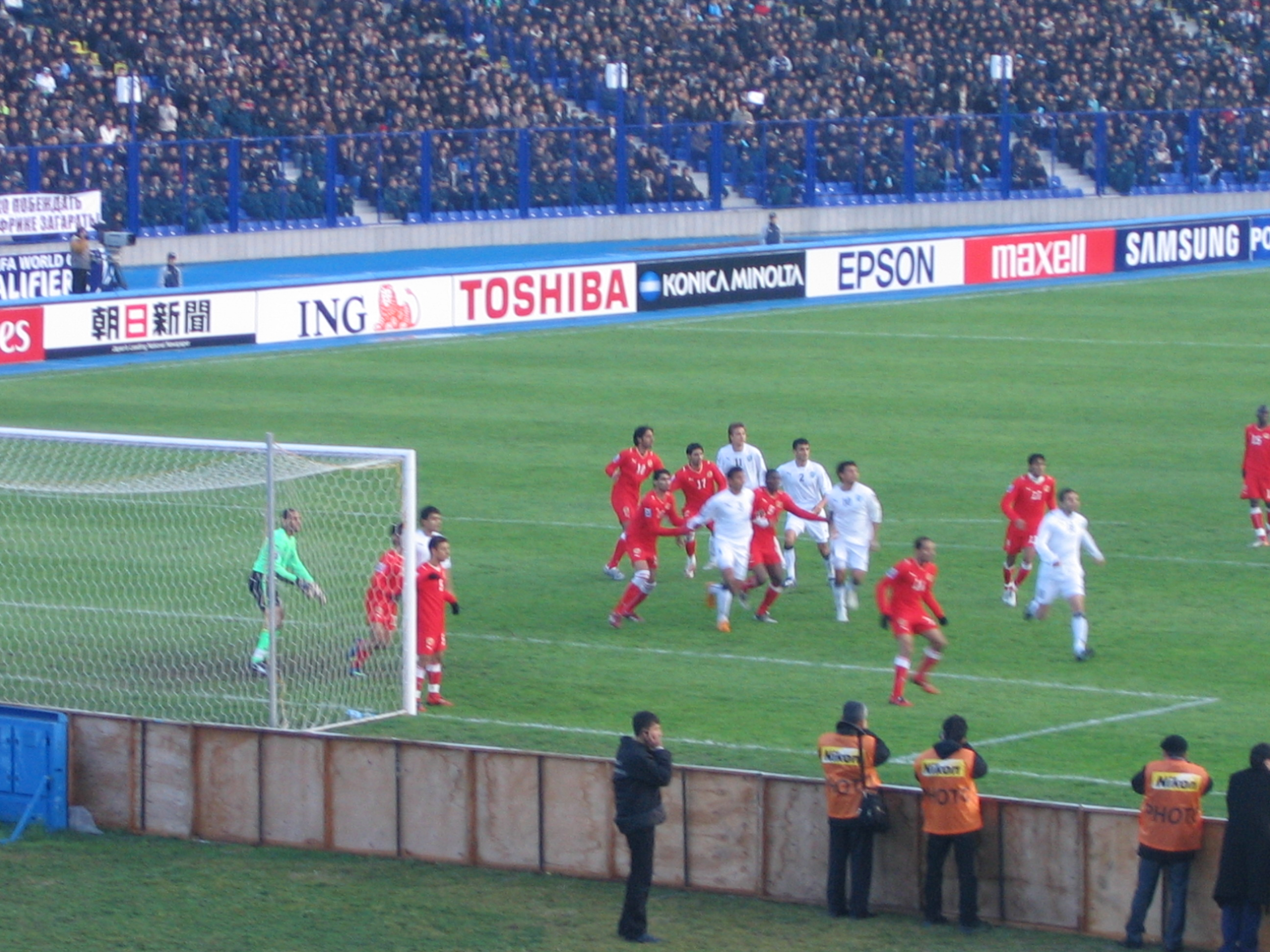
Uzbekistan vs Bahrain, 2009.

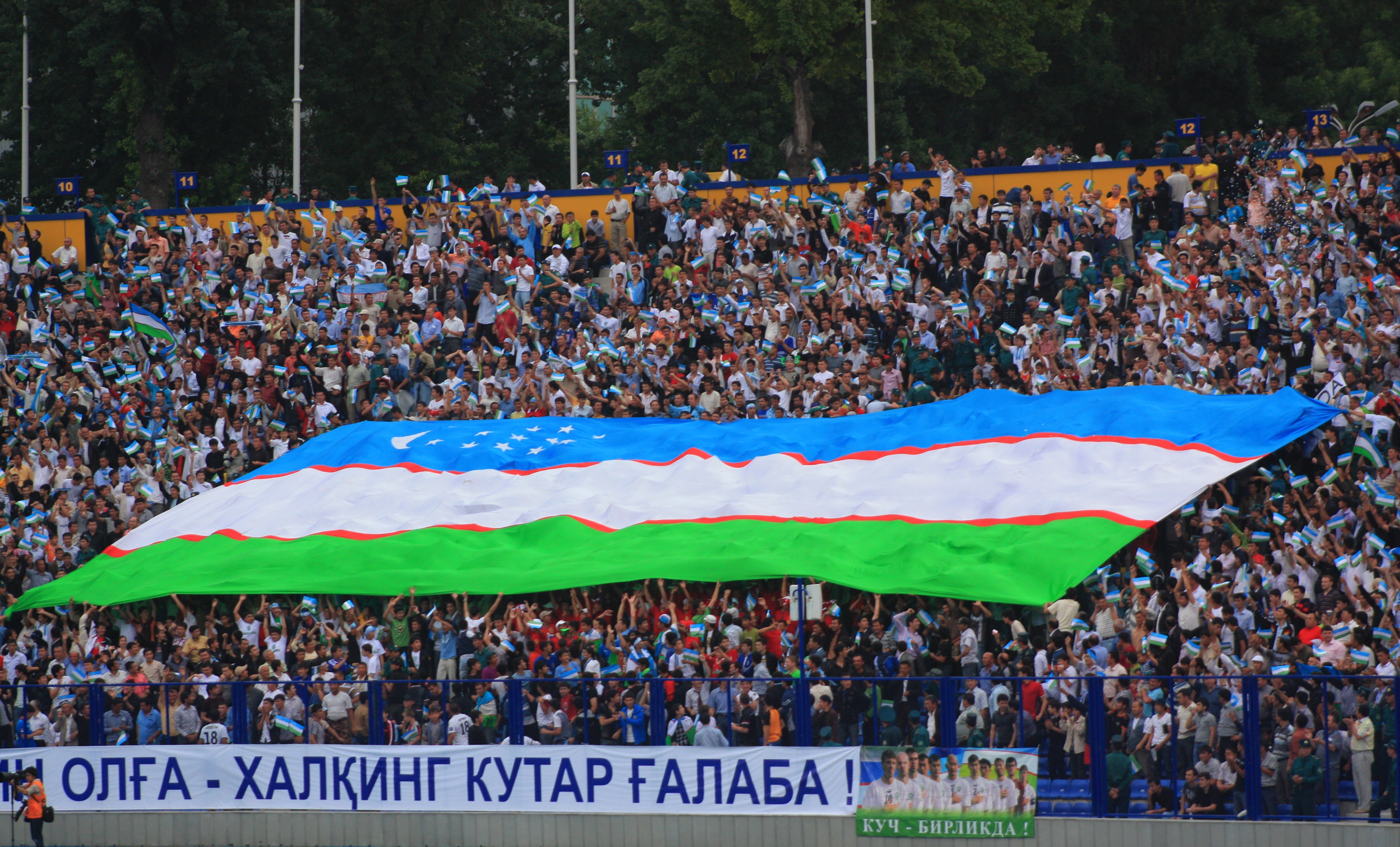
Uzbekistan vs Japan, 2012.
