= List of Uzbek football transfers 2013 =

This is a list of Uzbek football transfers for the 2012–13 winter and 2013 summer transfer window. Only transfers of the 2013 Uzbek League and First League are provided. Start of the season was March 2013.

== Winter 2012–13 ==
=== By date ===
As of 11 March 2013

| Date | Name | Pos. | Moving from | Moving to | Fee | Note |
|---|---|---|---|---|---|---|
| 2012 | (Uzbekistan) Eldor Tajibaev | GK | Qizilqum Zarafshon | Pakhtakor | End of loan | |
| 2012 | (Uzbekistan) Akram Bakhridtinov | MF | FK Andijan | Pakhtakor | End of loan | |
| 2012 | (Uzbekistan) Anvar Rakhimov | MF | FK Andijan | Pakhtakor | End of loan | |
| 2012 | (Uzbekistan) Ruzimboy Ahmedov | FW | FK Dinamo Samarqand | Pakhtakor | End of loan | |
| 2012 | (Uzbekistan) Akmal Kholmurodov | DF | FK Buxoro | Pakhtakor | End of loan | |
| 2012 | (Uzbekistan) Bakhriddin Vakhobov | FW | FK Buxoro | Pakhtakor | End of loan | |
| 2012 | (Uzbekistan) Oleg Drazhzhuk | MF | FK Buxoro | | | |
| 2012 | (Uzbekistan) Ilkhom Shomurodov | FW | Bunyodkor | Nasaf Qarshi | End of loan | |
| 2012 | (Uzbekistan) Arsen Tyulenev | FW | Olmaliq FK | | End of loan | |
| 2012 | (Uzbekistan) Yannis Mandzukas | MF | Mash'al Mubarek | Bunyodkor | End of loan | |
| 2012 | (Belarus) Vital Panasyuk | DF | Navbahor Namangan | | | |
| 2012 | (Belarus) Mikalay Ryndzyuk | FW | Navbahor Namangan | (Belarus) Smorgon | | |
| 2012 | (Uzbekistan) Botir Nosirov | GK | Navbahor Namangan | FK Buxoro | | |
| 2012 | (Uzbekistan) Jafar Irismetov | FW | Navbahor Namangan | | | |
| 2012 | (Latvia) Andrejs Perepļotkins | FW | Nasaf Qarshi | (Estonia) JK Narva Trans | End of contract | |
| 2012 | (Serbia) Aleksandar Petrović | MF | Nasaf Qarshi | | End of contract | |
| 2012 | (Uzbekistan) Shuhrat Mirkholdirshoev | FW | Nasaf Qarshi | | | |
| 2012 | (Armenia) Romik Khachatryan | MF | Lokomotiv Tashkent | | End of contract | |
| 2012 | (Nigeria) Patrick Agboh | MF | Shurtan Guzar | | | |
| November 28, 2012 | (Uzbekistan) Jasur Hasanov | MF | FK Buxoro | Lokomotiv Tashkent | | |
| December 10, 2012 | (Uzbekistan) Salim Mustofoev | DF | FK Dinamo Samarqand | Lokomotiv Tashkent | | |
| December 10, 2012 | (Uzbekistan) Pavel Smolyachenko | FW | Neftchi Farg'ona | Lokomotiv Tashkent | | |
| December 12, 2012 | (Ivory Coast) Taïna Adama Soro | MF | Shurtan Guzar | (Belarus) Shakhtyor Soligorsk | | |
| December 13, 2012 | (Uzbekistan) Ivan Nagaev | FW | FK Dinamo Samarqand | Lokomotiv Tashkent | | |
| December 20, 2012 | (Uzbekistan) Temur Kagirov | DF | Qizilqum Zarafshon | Pakhtakor | End of loan | |
| December 20, 2012 | (Uzbekistan) Ghulom Urunov | MF | Qizilqum Zarafshon | Pakhtakor | End of loan | |
| December 20, 2012 | (Uzbekistan) Azamat Bobojonov | MF | Qizilqum Zarafshon | Pakhtakor | End of loan | |
| December 20, 2012 | (Uzbekistan) Sanat Shikhov | FW | Qizilqum Zarafshon | Pakhtakor | End of loan | |
| December 21, 2012 | (Turkmenistan) Pavel Kharchik | GK | Olmaliq FK | | | |
| December 22, 2012 | (Uzbekistan) Maqsud Hayitov | DF | FK Andijan | Nasaf Qarshi | End of loan | |
| December 22, 2012 | (Uzbekistan) Rahmatulla Berdimurodov | DF | Shurtan Guzar | Nasaf Qarshi | End of loan | |
| December 24, 2012 | (Kazakhstan) Ilya Fomitchev | DF | Mash'al Mubarek | (Kazakhstan) Vostok | | |
| December 26, 2012 | (Uzbekistan) Oleg Zoteev | MF | Olmaliq FK | Bunyodkor | | |
| December 27, 2012 | (Uzbekistan) Samandar Shodmonov | MF | Mash'al Mubarek | Olmaliq FK | | |
| December 28, 2012 | (Uzbekistan) Murod Zukhurov | GK | Nasaf Qarshi | Bunyodkor | End of contract | |
| December 29, 2012 | (Turkmenistan) Maksim Kazankov | MF | Lokomotiv Tashkent | (Russia) Zenit Penza | | |
| December 30, 2012 | (Uzbekistan) Aleksandr Merzlyakov | MF | Shurtan Guzar | Pakhtakor | | |
| January 4, 2013 | (North Macedonia) Bojan Kalević | FW | Metallurg Bekabad | | | |
| January 4, 2013 | (Uzbekistan) Fayzulla Ahmedov | DF | Metallurg Bekabad | | | |
| January 4, 2013 | (Uzbekistan) Ghulom Halimtoev | MF | Metallurg Bekabad | | | |
| January 4, 2013 | (Uzbekistan) Fozil Musaev | MF | Nasaf Qarshi | Bunyodkor | | |
| January 4, 2013 | (Uzbekistan) Igor Taran | FW | Shurtan Guzar | Bunyodkor | | |
| January 5, 2013 | (Armenia) Zhora Hovhannisyan | MF | Lokomotiv Tashkent | Pakhtakor | | |
| January 5, 2013 | (Uzbekistan) Ildar Mamatkazin | DF | FK Andijan | Pakhtakor | | |
| January 6, 2013 | (Serbia) Milorad Resanovic | MF | Mash'al Mubarek | | | |
| January 6, 2013 | (Turkmenistan) Alik Haydarov | DF | Mash'al Mubarek | | | |
| January 6, 2013 | (Uzbekistan) Navruz Olimov | FW | FK Dinamo Samarqand | Qizilqum Zarafshon | | |
| January 6, 2013 | (Uzbekistan) Alisher Mahmudov | MF | Navbahor Namangan | FK Buxoro | | |
| January 7, 2013 | (Uzbekistan) Zokhid Abdullaev | FW | Metallurg Bekabad | Nasaf Qarshi | | |
| January 7, 2013 | (Russia) Alan Kusov | MF | (Russia) FC Luch-Energiya Vladivostok | Lokomotiv Tashkent | | |
| January 7, 2013 | (Ukraine) Ihor Tymchenko | FW | (Ukraine) FC Krymteplytsia Molodizhne | Lokomotiv Tashkent | | |
| January 14, 2013 | (Uzbekistan) Jurabek Khusanboev | DF | FK Guliston | | | |
| January 14, 2013 | (Uzbekistan) Anvar Abduqodirov | FW | FK Guliston | | | |
| January 14, 2013 | (Uzbekistan) Asilbek Mansurov | DF | FK Guliston | Pakhtakor | End of loan | |
| January 15, 2013 | (Montenegro) Ivan Bošković | FW | Nasaf Qarshi | (Thailand) Chonburi | End of contract | |
| January 22, 2013 | (Montenegro) Sanibal Orahovac | DF | Pakhtakor | (Montenegro) FK Mladost Podgorica | End of contract | |
| January 24, 2013 | (Uzbekistan) Anvar Rajabov | FW | (Thailand) Buriram United | Pakhtakor | | |
| January 25, 2013 | (Uzbekistan) Egor Krimets | DF | Pakhtakor | (China) Beijing Guoan | Loan | |
| January 26, 2013 | (Uzbekistan) Timur Ganiev | GK | Olmaliq FK | Lokomotiv Tashkent | | |
| January 26, 2013 | (Uzbekistan) Viktor Karpenko | MF | Bunyodkor | Lokomotiv Tashkent | | |
| January 27, 2013 | (Uzbekistan) Farhod Tojiyev | FW | Shurtan Guzar | Lokomotiv Tashkent | | |
| January 27, 2013 | (Uzbekistan) Ruslan Melziddinov | MF | Bunyodkor | Lokomotiv Tashkent | | |
| February 5, 2013 | (Uzbekistan) Otabek Valijonov | MF | FK Andijan | FK Buxoro | | |
| February 7, 2013 | (Uzbekistan) Vitaliy Pochuev | DF | FK Dinamo Samarqand | Navbahor Namangan | | |
| February 7, 2013 | (Uzbekistan) Dilyaver Abibullaev | MF | FK Dinamo Samarqand | Shurtan Guzar | | |
| February 7, 2013 | (Uzbekistan) Shukur Jumaboev | MF | Neftchi Farg'ona | Shurtan Guzar | | |
| February 7, 2013 | (Uzbekistan) Ibrohim Otahanov | MF | FK Andijan | Shurtan Guzar | | |
| February 7, 2013 | (Lithuania) Artūras Fomenka | FW | Lokomotiv Tashkent | Shurtan Guzar | | |
| February 7, 2013 | (Uzbekistan) Pavel Solomin | FW | Mash'al Mubarek | Shurtan Guzar | | |
| February 7, 2013 | (Uzbekistan) Aleksandr Vostrikov | FW | Olmaliq FK | Shurtan Guzar | | |
| February 17, 2013 | (Uzbekistan) Timur Ayzatullov | MF | Olmaliq FK | Qizilqum Zarafshon | | |
| February 17, 2013 | (Uzbekistan) Nosirbek Otakuziev | FW | Olmaliq FK | FK Guliston | | |
| February 18, 2013 | (Uzbekistan) Durbek Umaraliev | DF | Navbahor Namangan | Sogdiana Jizzakh | | |
| February 19, 2013 | (Uzbekistan) Artyom Makosin | GK | Qizilqum Zarafshon | Zarafshon Navoi | | |
| February 19, 2013 | (Uzbekistan) Akmal Kholiqov | DF | Qizilqum Zarafshon | Zarafshon Navoi | | |
| February 19, 2013 | (Uzbekistan) Alisher Kholiqov | FW | Qizilqum Zarafshon | Zarafshon Navoi | | |
| February 19, 2013 | (Uzbekistan) Yannis Mandzukas | MF | Bunyodkor | Qizilqum Zarafshon | | |
| February 19, 2013 | (Uzbekistan) Olim Navkarov | FW | FK Dinamo Samarqand | Qizilqum Zarafshon | | |
| February 19, 2013 | (Russia) Vladimir Shishelov | MF | Nasaf Qarshi | (Russia) Metallurg-Kuzbass Novokuznetsk | | |
| February 20, 2013 | (Uzbekistan) Ruzimboy Ahmedov | FW | Pakhtakor | Navbahor Namangan | | |
| February 21, 2013 | (Serbia) Marko Blažić | MF | (Russia) Amkar Perm | Bunyodkor | | |
| February 21, 2013 | (Ukraine) Oleksandr Pyschur | FW | (Ukraine) Obolon Kyiv | Bunyodkor | | |
| February 21, 2013 | (Uzbekistan) Shavkat Salomov | MF | Bunyodkor | (Kazakhstan) Zhetysu | | |
| February 21, 2013 | (Uzbekistan) Aleksandr Khvostunov | DF | FK Dinamo Samarqand | NBU Osiyo | | |
| February 21, 2013 | (Uzbekistan) Sanzhar Tursunov | MF | (Russia) Alania Vladikavkaz | Lokomotiv Tashkent | | |
| February 22, 2013 | (Uzbekistan) Ruslan Melziddinov | MF | Lokomotiv Tashkent | (Kazakhstan) Zhetysu | | |
| February 23, 2013 | (Uzbekistan) Leonid Koshelev | MF | FK Dinamo Samarqand | Navbahor Namangan | | |
| February 24, 2013 | (Uzbekistan) Viktor Mochalov | GK | Bunyodkor | Navbahor Namangan | | |
| February 24, 2013 | (Uzbekistan) Rasuljon Shukhratov | FW | Bunyodkor | Navbahor Namangan | | |
| February 24, 2013 | (Uzbekistan) Maqsud Hayitov | DF | Nasaf Qarshi | Navbahor Namangan | | |
| February 25, 2013 | (Uzbekistan) Mikhail Naumov | GK | Shurtan Guzar | Nasaf Qarshi | | |
| February 25, 2013 | (Uzbekistan) Hamza Karimov | DF | Shurtan Guzar | Nasaf Qarshi | | |
| February 25, 2013 | (Uzbekistan) Laziz Ubaydullaev | DF | Shurtan Guzar | Nasaf Qarshi | | |
| February 25, 2013 | (Uzbekistan) Shuhrat Muhammadiev | MF | Mash'al Mubarek | Nasaf Qarshi | | |
| February 25, 2013 | (Uzbekistan) Shavkat Mullajanov | MF | (Saudi Arabia) Al Nassr | Lokomotiv Tashkent | | |
| February 26, 2013 | (Ukraine) Ihor Tymchenko | FW | Lokomotiv Tashkent | | | |
| February 27, 2013 | (Uzbekistan) Vadim Afonin | MF | Shurtan Guzar | (Russia) Salyut Belgorod | | |
| February 27, 2013 | (Uzbekistan) Oleg Gorvits | GK | Qizilqum Zarafshon | FK Dinamo Samarqand | | |
| February 27, 2013 | (Uzbekistan) Aleksandr Kletskov | DF | Pakhtakor | FK Dinamo Samarqand | | |
| February 27, 2013 | (Uzbekistan) Akmal Kholmurodov | DF | Pakhtakor | FK Dinamo Samarqand | Loan | |
| February 27, 2013 | (Uzbekistan) Temur Dadashev | MF | Mash'al Mubarek | FK Dinamo Samarqand | | |
| February 27, 2013 | (Turkmenistan) Serdarali Atoev | FW | | FK Dinamo Samarqand | | |
| February 27, 2013 | (Ukraine) Volodymyr Kilikevych | FW | (Moldova) Iskra-Stal | FK Dinamo Samarqand | | |
| February 27, 2013 | (Uzbekistan) Tulqin Mirzaev | FW | Qizilqum Zarafshon | FK Dinamo Samarqand | | |
| February 27, 2013 | (Uzbekistan) Shavkat Mullajanov | DF | Lokomotiv Tashkent | (China) Liaoning Whowin | | |
| February 28, 2013 | (Uzbekistan) Sherzod Karimov | MF | Pakhtakor | (China) Qingdao Jonoon | Loan | |
| February 28, 2013 | (Uzbekistan) Timur Khakimov | FW | Pakhtakor | FK Andijan | Loan | |
| March 1, 2013 | (Lithuania) Pavelas Leusas | GK | Qizilqum Zarafshon | Shurtan Guzar | | |
| March 1, 2013 | (Uzbekistan) Shavkat Raimqulov | DF | Nasaf Qarshi | Shurtan Guzar | | |
| March 1, 2013 | (Uzbekistan) Jamol Otakulov | DF | FK Dinamo Samarqand | Shurtan Guzar | | |
| March 1, 2013 | (Uzbekistan) Zokhid Raupov | MF | Navbahor Namangan | Shurtan Guzar | | |
| March 1, 2013 | (Uzbekistan) Aziz Mansurov | MF | Istiqlol Toshkent | Shurtan Guzar | | |
| March 1, 2013 | (Uzbekistan) Muzaffar Umrzoqov | MF | Qizilqum Zarafshon | Shurtan Guzar | | |
| March 1, 2013 | (Uzbekistan) Ibrokhim Rakhimov | MF | Lokomotiv Tashkent | FK Guliston | Loan | |
| March 1, 2013 | (Uzbekistan) Sobir Usmonkhujaev | MF | Lokomotiv Tashkent | FK Guliston | Loan | |
| March 2, 2013 | (Moldova) Alexandru Melenciuc | GK | (Moldova) Speranța Crihana Veche | Sogdiana Jizzakh | | |
| March 2, 2013 | (Uzbekistan) Nodir Ashurmatov | GK | Pakhtakor | Sogdiana Jizzakh | | |
| March 2, 2013 | (Uzbekistan) Orif Mamajonov | DF | Bunyodkor | Sogdiana Jizzakh | | |
| March 2, 2013 | (Uzbekistan) Sardor Qakhorov | DF | Bunyodkor | Sogdiana Jizzakh | | |
| March 2, 2013 | (Uzbekistan) Siroj Hamroev | DF | Olmaliq FK | Sogdiana Jizzakh | | |
| March 2, 2013 | (Uzbekistan) Suhrob Berdiev | MF | Olmaliq FK | Sogdiana Jizzakh | | |
| March 2, 2013 | (Uzbekistan) Rinat Bayramov | MF | Navbahor Namangan | Sogdiana Jizzakh | | |
| March 2, 2013 | (Uzbekistan) Javadullo Ibrohimov | MF | Metallurg Bekabad | Sogdiana Jizzakh | | |
| March 2, 2013 | (Uzbekistan) Ilyos Qurbonov | FW | Metallurg Bekabad | Sogdiana Jizzakh | | |
| March 2, 2013 | (Uzbekistan) Jahongir Mustafoqulov | FW | Ghallakor | Sogdiana Jizzakh | | |
| March 3, 2013 | (Uzbekistan) Temur Kagirov | DF | Pakhtakor | Olmaliq FK | | |
| March 3, 2013 | (Uzbekistan) Umid Honimqulov | GK | FK Khiva | Olmaliq FK | | |
| March 3, 2013 | (Uzbekistan) Mamur Abdullaev | DF | FK Khiva | Olmaliq FK | | |
| March 3, 2013 | (Serbia) Igor Petković | MF | Mash'al Mubarek | Olmaliq FK | | |
| March 3, 2013 | (Uzbekistan) Akmal Rustamov | DF | Qizilqum Zarafshon | Olmaliq FK | | |
| March 3, 2013 | (Uzbekistan) Sherali Juraev | MF | Qizilqum Zarafshon | Olmaliq FK | | |
| March 3, 2013 | (Uzbekistan) Sardor Sotvoldiev | MF | FK Kosonsoy | Olmaliq FK | | |
| March 3, 2013 | (Uzbekistan) Shakhboz Erkinov | FW | Pakhtakor | Olmaliq FK | | |
| March 3, 2013 | (Uzbekistan) Moydin Mamazulunov | FW | FK Andijan | Olmaliq FK | | |
| March 5, 2013 | (Uzbekistan) Sergey Smorodin | GK | Pakhtakor | FK Andijan | Loan | |
| March 5, 2013 | (Uzbekistan) Eldor Tajibaev | GK | Pakhtakor | Qizilqum Zarafshon | Loan | |
| March 5, 2013 | (Uzbekistan) Alisher Turdiev | DF | Nasaf-2 | Qizilqum Zarafshon | | |
| March 5, 2013 | (Uzbekistan) Timur Yafarov | DF | Olmaliq FK | Qizilqum Zarafshon | | |
| March 5, 2013 | (Uzbekistan) Muqimjon Toshmatov | MF | FK Andijan | Qizilqum Zarafshon | | |
| March 5, 2013 | (Uzbekistan) Ghulomhaydar Ghulomov | MF | Mash'al Mubarek | Qizilqum Zarafshon | | |
| March 5, 2013 | (Uzbekistan) Akmal Tursunboev | GK | Pakhtakor | FK Dinamo Samarqand | Loan | |
| March 5, 2013 | (Uzbekistan) Tokhir Shamshitdinov | DF | Pakhtakor | FK Guliston | Loan | |
| March 5, 2013 | (Uzbekistan) Akram Bakhridtinov | MF | Pakhtakor | Navbahor Namangan | Loan | |
| March 5, 2013 | (Uzbekistan) Ilhom Boydedaev | MF | FK Dinamo Samarqand | Navbahor Namangan | Loan | |
| March 5, 2013 | (Uzbekistan) Muhammadjon Abdullaev | MF | Mash'al Mubarek | Navbahor Namangan | Loan | |
| March 5, 2013 | (Uzbekistan) Azamat Bobojonov | MF | Pakhtakor | FK Dinamo Samarqand | Loan | |
| March 5, 2013 | (Uzbekistan) Nodir Kamolov | MF | Pakhtakor | Neftchi Farg'ona | | |
| March 5, 2013 | (Uzbekistan) Farhod Nishonov | MF | Pakhtakor | Qizilqum Zarafshon | | |
| March 5, 2013 | (Uzbekistan) Anvar Rakhimov | MF | Pakhtakor | Sogdiana Jizzakh | Loan | |
| March 5, 2013 | (Uzbekistan) Bakhriddin Vakhobov | FW | Pakhtakor | FK Buxoro | Reloan | |
| March 5, 2013 | (Uzbekistan) Alisher Azizov | FW | Pakhtakor | FK Buxoro | Loan | |
| March 5, 2013 | (Uzbekistan) Bobur Doniyorov | | Pakhtakor | Sherdor | Loan | |
| March 5, 2013 | (Uzbekistan) Bobur Iskandarov | | Pakhtakor | Zarafshon Navoi | Loan | |
| March 5, 2013 | (Uzbekistan) Farrukh Shotursunov | FW | Pakhtakor | Qizilqum Zarafshon | Loan | |
| March 5, 2013 | (Uzbekistan) Azamat Abdullaev | DF | Pakhtakor | Qizilqum Zarafshon | Loan | |
| March 7, 2013 | (Uzbekistan) Asqar Jadigerov | MF | FK Dinamo Samarqand | FK Andijan | | |
| March 11, 2013 | (Uzbekistan) Sukhrob Sultonov | GK | FK Dinamo Samarqand | Metallurg Bekabad | | |
| March 11, 2013 | (Uzbekistan) Sunatilla Mamadaliev | MF | FK Dinamo Samarqand | Metallurg Bekabad | | |
| March 11, 2013 | (Russia) Aleksandr Kovalyov | DF | (Russia) Yenisey Krasnoyarsk | Metallurg Bekabad | | |
| March 11, 2013 | (Uzbekistan) Mirjalol Qurbonov | MF | Xorazm FK Urganch | FK Guliston | | |
| March 11, 2013 | (Uzbekistan) Ilyos Khаyrov | FW | FK Buxoro | FK Guliston | | |
| March 27, 2013 | (Uzbekistan) Ildar Magdeev | MF | Lokomotiv Tashkent | Oqtepa Toshkent | | |

=== By team ===
==== FK Buxoro ====
In: Note: Flags indicate national team as defined under FIFA eligibility rules; some limited exceptions apply. Players may hold more than one non-FIFA nationality.

| No. | Pos. | Nation | Player |
|---|---|---|---|
| — | MF | UZB | Bakhriddin Vakhobov (reloan from (Uzbekistan) FC Pakhtakor, 2013) |
| — | FW | UZB | Alisher Azizov (on loan from (Uzbekistan) FC Pakhtakor) |
| — | MF | UZB | Otabek Valijonov (from (Uzbekistan) FK Andijan) |
| — | GK | UZB | Botir Nosirov (from (Uzbekistan) Navbahor Namangan) |

Out: Note: Flags indicate national team as defined under FIFA eligibility rules; some limited exceptions apply. Players may hold more than one non-FIFA nationality.

| No. | Pos. | Nation | Player |
|---|---|---|---|
| — | MF | UZB | Oleg Drazhzhuk |
| — | MF | UZB | Jasur Hasanov (to (Uzbekistan) Lokomotiv Tashkent) |
| — | MF | UZB | Bakhriddin Vakhobov (end of loan from (Uzbekistan) FC Pakhtakor, 2012) |
| — | MF | UZB | Akmal Kholmurodov (end of loan from (Uzbekistan) FC Pakhtakor) |
| — | FW | UZB | Ilyos Khаyrov (to (Uzbekistan) FK Guliston) |

==== Bunyodkor ====
In: Note: Flags indicate national team as defined under FIFA eligibility rules; some limited exceptions apply. Players may hold more than one non-FIFA nationality.

| No. | Pos. | Nation | Player |
|---|---|---|---|
| 7 | MF | SRB | Marko Blažić (from (Russia) FC Amkar Perm) |
| 9 | FW | UZB | Igor Taran (from (Uzbekistan) Shurtan Guzar) |
| 11 | DF | UKR | Oleksandr Pyschur (from (Ukraine) Obolon Kyiv) |
| 18 | MF | UZB | Fozil Musaev (from (Uzbekistan) Nasaf Qarshi) |
| 25 | GK | UZB | Murod Zukhurov (from (Uzbekistan) Nasaf Qarshi) |
| 33 | MF | UZB | Oleg Zoteev (from (Uzbekistan) Olmaliq FK) |
| — | MF | UZB | Yannis Mandzukas (from (Uzbekistan) Mash'al Mubarek) |

Out: Note: Flags indicate national team as defined under FIFA eligibility rules; some limited exceptions apply. Players may hold more than one non-FIFA nationality.

| No. | Pos. | Nation | Player |
|---|---|---|---|
| — | DF | UZB | Orif Mamajonov (to (Uzbekistan) Sogdiana Jizzakh) |
| — | DF | UZB | Sardor Qakhorov (to (Uzbekistan) Sogdiana Jizzakh) |
| 10 | MF | UZB | Shavkat Salomov (to (Kazakhstan) FC Zhetysu) |
| 22 | MF | UZB | Viktor Karpenko (to (Uzbekistan) Lokomotiv Tashkent, end of contract) |
| 28 | MF | UZB | Ruslan Melziddinov (to (Uzbekistan) Lokomotiv Tashkent) |
| 33 | MF | SVK | Ján Kozák |
| 35 | GK | UZB | Viktor Mochalov (to (Uzbekistan) Navbahor Namangan) |
| — | MF | UZB | Yannis Mandzukas (to (Uzbekistan) Qizilqum Zarafshon) |
| — | FW | UZB | Ilkhom Shomurodov (end of loan from (Uzbekistan) Nasaf Qarshi) |
| 31 | FW | UZB | Rasuljon Shukhratov (to (Uzbekistan) Navbahor Namangan) |

==== FK Guliston ====
In: Note: Flags indicate national team as defined under FIFA eligibility rules; some limited exceptions apply. Players may hold more than one non-FIFA nationality.

| No. | Pos. | Nation | Player |
|---|---|---|---|
| 22 | DF | UZB | Tokhir Shamshitdinov (on loan from (Uzbekistan) FC Pakhtakor) |
| 11 | FW | UZB | Nosirbek Otakuziev (from (Uzbekistan) Olmaliq FK) |
| — | MF | UZB | Ibrokhim Rakhimov (on loan from (Uzbekistan) Lokomotiv Tashkent) |
| 15 | MF | UZB | Sobir Usmonkhujaev (on loan from (Uzbekistan) Lokomotiv Tashkent) |
| 21 | MF | UZB | Mirjalol Qurbonov (from (Uzbekistan) Xorazm FK Urganch) |

Out: Note: Flags indicate national team as defined under FIFA eligibility rules; some limited exceptions apply. Players may hold more than one non-FIFA nationality.

| No. | Pos. | Nation | Player |
|---|---|---|---|
| — | DF | UZB | Asilbek Mansurov (end of loan from (Uzbekistan) FC Pakhtakor) |
| — | DF | UZB | Jurabek Khusanboev |
| — | MF | UZB | Anvar Abduqodirov |
| — | FW | UZB | Vladimir Gavrilov |

==== FK Dinamo Samarqand ====
In: Note: Flags indicate national team as defined under FIFA eligibility rules; some limited exceptions apply. Players may hold more than one non-FIFA nationality.

| No. | Pos. | Nation | Player |
|---|---|---|---|
| — | GK | UZB | Akmal Tursunboev (on loan from (Uzbekistan) FC Pakhtakor) |
| 73 | GK | UZB | Oleg Gorvits (from (Uzbekistan) Qizilqum Zarafshon) |
| 13 | DF | UZB | Aleksandr Kletskov (from (Uzbekistan) FC Pakhtakor) |
| 16 | DF | UZB | Akmal Kholmurodov (on loan from (Uzbekistan) FC Pakhtakor) |
| 21 | MF | UZB | Azamat Bobojonov (on loan from (Uzbekistan) FC Pakhtakor) |
| 24 | MF | UZB | Temur Dadashev (from (Uzbekistan) Mash'al Mubarek) |
| 14 | FW | TKM | Serdarali Atoev |
| — | FW | UZB | Tulqin Mirzaev (from (Uzbekistan) Qizilqum Zarafshon) |
| 9 | FW | UKR | Volodymyr Kilikevych (from (Moldova) Iskra-Stal) |

Out: Note: Flags indicate national team as defined under FIFA eligibility rules; some limited exceptions apply. Players may hold more than one non-FIFA nationality.

| No. | Pos. | Nation | Player |
|---|---|---|---|
| — | GK | UZB | Sukhrob Sultonov (to (Uzbekistan) Metallurg Bekabad) |
| — | DF | UZB | Ruzimboy Ahmedov (end of loan from (Uzbekistan) FC Pakhtakor) |
| — | DF | UZB | Salim Mustofoev (to (Uzbekistan) Lokomotiv Tashkent) |
| — | DF | UZB | Aleksandr Khvostunov (to (Uzbekistan) NBU Osiyo) |
| — | DF | UZB | Vitaliy Pochuev (to (Uzbekistan) Navbahor Namangan) |
| — | DF | UZB | Jamol Otakulov (to (Uzbekistan) FC Shurtan Guzar) |
| — | MF | UZB | Ilhom Boydedaev (to (Uzbekistan) Navbahor Namangan) |
| — | MF | UZB | Sunatilla Mamadaliev (to (Uzbekistan) Metallurg Bekabad) |
| — | MF | UZB | Dilyaver Abibullaev (to (Uzbekistan) FC Shurtan Guzar) |
| — | MF | UZB | Asqar Jadigerov (to (Uzbekistan) FK Andijan) |
| — | MF | UZB | Leonid Koshelev (to (Uzbekistan) Navbahor Namangan) |
| — | FW | UZB | Ivan Nagaev (to (Uzbekistan) Lokomotiv Tashkent) |
| — | FW | UZB | Navruz Olimov (to (Uzbekistan) Qizilqum Zarafshon) |

==== Lokomotiv Tashkent ====
In: Note: Flags indicate national team as defined under FIFA eligibility rules; some limited exceptions apply. Players may hold more than one non-FIFA nationality.

| No. | Pos. | Nation | Player |
|---|---|---|---|
| 12 | GK | UZB | Timur Ganiev (from (Uzbekistan) Olmaliq FK) |
| — | DF | UZB | Salim Mustofoev (from (Uzbekistan) FK Dinamo Samarqand) |
| — | DF | UZB | Shavkat Mullajanov (from (Saudi Arabia) Al Nassr) |
| 14 | MF | RUS | Alan Kusov (from (Russia) Luch-Energiya) |
| 16 | MF | UZB | Jasur Hasanov (from (Uzbekistan) FK Buxoro) |
| 29 | MF | UZB | Viktor Karpenko (from (Uzbekistan) Bunyodkor) |
| — | MF | UZB | Ruslan Melziddinov (from (Uzbekistan) Bunyodkor) |
| 77 | MF | UZB | Sanzhar Tursunov (from (Russia) Alania Vladikavkaz) |
| 21 | FW | UKR | Ihor Tymchenko (from (Ukraine) Krymteplytsia Molodizhne) |
| 23 | FW | UZB | Ivan Nagaev (from (Uzbekistan) FK Dinamo Samarqand) |
| 10 | FW | UZB | Farhod Tojiyev (from (Uzbekistan) Shurtan Guzar) |
| 18 | FW | UZB | Pavel Smolyachenko (from (Uzbekistan) Neftchi Farg'ona) |

Out: Note: Flags indicate national team as defined under FIFA eligibility rules; some limited exceptions apply. Players may hold more than one non-FIFA nationality.

| No. | Pos. | Nation | Player |
|---|---|---|---|
| — | DF | UZB | Shavkat Mullajanov (to (China) Liaoning Whowin) |
| — | MF | ARM | Zhora Hovhannisyan (to (Uzbekistan) FC Pakhtakor) |
| — | MF | ARM | Romik Khachatryan (end of contract) |
| — | MF | UZB | Aleksandr Khvostunov (to (Uzbekistan) NBU Osiyo) |
| — | MF | TKM | Maksim Kazankov |
| — | MF | UZB | Ildar Magdeev (to (Uzbekistan) Oqtepa Toshkent) |
| — | MF | UZB | Ruslan Melziddinov (to (Kazakhstan) FC Zhetysu) |
| — | MF | UZB | Ibrokhim Rakhimov (on loan to (Uzbekistan) FK Guliston) |
| — | MF | UZB | Sobir Usmonkhujaev (on loan to (Uzbekistan) FK Guliston) |
| — | FW | LTU | Artūras Fomenka (to (Uzbekistan) FC Shurtan Guzar) |
| 21 | FW | UKR | Ihor Tymchenko |

==== Metallurg Bekabad ====
In: Note: Flags indicate national team as defined under FIFA eligibility rules; some limited exceptions apply. Players may hold more than one non-FIFA nationality.

| No. | Pos. | Nation | Player |
|---|---|---|---|
| 32 | GK | UZB | Sukhrob Sultonov (from (Uzbekistan) FK Dinamo Samarqand) |
| 8 | MF | UZB | Sunatilla Mamadaliev (from (Uzbekistan) FK Dinamo Samarqand) |
| 13 | DF | RUS | Aleksandr Kovalyov (from (Russia) FC Yenisey Krasnoyarsk) |

Out: Note: Flags indicate national team as defined under FIFA eligibility rules; some limited exceptions apply. Players may hold more than one non-FIFA nationality.

| No. | Pos. | Nation | Player |
|---|---|---|---|
| — | DF | UZB | Fayzulla Ahmedov (end of contract) |
| — | MF | UZB | Ghulom Halimtoev |
| 2 | MF | UZB | Javadullo Ibrohimov (to (Uzbekistan) Sogdiana Jizzakh) |
| — | FW | UZB | Zokhid Abdullaev (to (Uzbekistan) Nasaf Qarshi) |
| — | FW | UZB | Ilyos Qurbonov (to (Uzbekistan) Sogdiana Jizzakh) |
| — | FW | MKD | Bojan Kalević |

==== Navbahor Namangan ====
In: Note: Flags indicate national team as defined under FIFA eligibility rules; some limited exceptions apply. Players may hold more than one non-FIFA nationality.

| No. | Pos. | Nation | Player |
|---|---|---|---|
| 1 | GK | UZB | Viktor Mochalov (from (Uzbekistan) Bunyodkor) |
| 15 | DF | UZB | Vitaliy Pochuev (from (Uzbekistan) FK Dinamo Samarqand) |
| 6 | MF | UZB | Leonid Koshelev (from (Uzbekistan) FK Dinamo Samarqand) |
| 9 | MF | UZB | Ilhom Boydedaev (from (Uzbekistan) FK Dinamo Samarqand) |
| 10 | MF | UZB | Akram Bakhridtinov (on loan from (Uzbekistan) FC Pakhtakor) |
| — | MF | UZB | Muhammadjon Abdullaev (from (Uzbekistan) Mash'al Mubarek) |
| 11 | FW | UZB | Rasuljon Shukhratov (from (Uzbekistan) FC Bunyodkor) |
| 22 | FW | UZB | Ruzimboy Ahmedov (from (Uzbekistan) FK Dinamo Samarqand) |

Out: Note: Flags indicate national team as defined under FIFA eligibility rules; some limited exceptions apply. Players may hold more than one non-FIFA nationality.

| No. | Pos. | Nation | Player |
|---|---|---|---|
| — | GK | UZB | Botir Nosirov (to (Uzbekistan) FK Buxoro) |
| — | DF | BLR | Vital Panasyuk |
| — | FW | BLR | Mikalay Ryndzyuk |
| — | DF | UZB | Durbek Umaraliev (to (Uzbekistan) Sogdiana Jizzakh) |
| — | MF | UZB | Rinat Bayramov (to (Uzbekistan) Sogdiana Jizzakh) |
| — | MF | UZB | Alisher Mahmudov (to (Uzbekistan) FK Buxoro) |
| — | MF | UZB | Zokhid Raupov (to (Uzbekistan) FC Shurtan Guzar) |
| — | FW | UZB | Jafar Irismetov |

==== Nasaf Qarshi ====
In: Note: Flags indicate national team as defined under FIFA eligibility rules; some limited exceptions apply. Players may hold more than one non-FIFA nationality.

| No. | Pos. | Nation | Player |
|---|---|---|---|
| 1 | GK | UZB | Mikhail Naumov (from (Uzbekistan) FC Shurtan Guzar) |
| 32 | DF | UZB | Hamza Karimov (from (Uzbekistan) FC Shurtan Guzar) |
| 3 | DF | UZB | Rahmatulla Berdimurodov (loan return from (Uzbekistan) FC Shurtan Guzar) |
| — | DF | UZB | Maqsud Hayitov (loan return from (Uzbekistan) FK Andijan) |
| 14 | DF | UZB | Laziz Ubaydullaev (from (Uzbekistan) FC Shurtan Guzar) |
| 28 | MF | UZB | Shuhrat Muhammadiev (from (Uzbekistan) Mash'al Mubarek) |
| 15 | FW | UZB | Zokhid Abdullaev (from (Uzbekistan) Metallurg Bekabad) |
| — | FW | UZB | Nosirbek Otakuziev (loan return from (Uzbekistan) Olmaliq FK) |
| 9 | FW | UZB | Ilkhom Shomurodov (loan return from (Uzbekistan) FC Bunyodkor) |

Out: Note: Flags indicate national team as defined under FIFA eligibility rules; some limited exceptions apply. Players may hold more than one non-FIFA nationality.

| No. | Pos. | Nation | Player |
|---|---|---|---|
| — | FW | LVA | Andrejs Perepļotkins (to (Estonia) JK Narva Trans) |
| — | FW | MNE | Ivan Bošković (to (Thailand) Chonburi) |
| — | MF | RUS | Vladimir Shishelov (to (Russia) FC Metallurg-Kuzbass Novokuznetsk) |
| — | MF | SRB | Aleksandar Petrović |
| — | GK | UZB | Murod Zukhurov (to (Uzbekistan) FC Bunyodkor, end of contract) |
| — | DF | UZB | Maqsud Hayitov (to (Uzbekistan) Navbahor Namangan) |
| — | DF | UZB | Shavkat Raimqulov (to (Uzbekistan) FC Shurtan Guzar) |
| — | MF | UZB | Fozil Musaev (to (Uzbekistan) FC Bunyodkor) |
| — | FW | UZB | Nosirbek Otakuziev (to (Uzbekistan) FK Guliston) |
| 33 | FW | UZB | Shuhrat Mirkholdirshoev (to) |

==== Neftchi Farg'ona ====
In: Note: Flags indicate national team as defined under FIFA eligibility rules; some limited exceptions apply. Players may hold more than one non-FIFA nationality.

| No. | Pos. | Nation | Player |
|---|---|---|---|
| — | MF | UZB | Nodir Kamolov (from (Uzbekistan) FC Pakhtakor) |

Out: Note: Flags indicate national team as defined under FIFA eligibility rules; some limited exceptions apply. Players may hold more than one non-FIFA nationality.

| No. | Pos. | Nation | Player |
|---|---|---|---|
| — | MF | UZB | Shukur Jumaboev (to (Uzbekistan) FC Shurtan Guzar) |
| — | FW | UZB | Pavel Smolyachenko (to (Uzbekistan) Lokomotiv Tashkent) |

==== Olmaliq FK ====
In: Note: Flags indicate national team as defined under FIFA eligibility rules; some limited exceptions apply. Players may hold more than one non-FIFA nationality.

| No. | Pos. | Nation | Player |
|---|---|---|---|
| 16 | GK | UZB | Umid Honimqulov (from (Uzbekistan) FK Khiva) |
| 2 | DF | UZB | Temur Kagirov (from (Uzbekistan) FC Pakhtakor) |
| 6 | DF | UZB | Akmal Rustamov (from (Uzbekistan) Qizilqum Zarafshon) |
| 17 | DF | UZB | Mamur Abdullaev (from (Uzbekistan) FK Khiva) |
| 13 | MF | UZB | Igor Petković (from (Uzbekistan) Mash'al Mubarek) |
| 18 | MF | UZB | Samandar Shodmonov (from (Uzbekistan) Mash'al Mubarek) |
| 23 | MF | UZB | Sherali Juraev (from (Uzbekistan) Qizilqum Zarafshon) |
| 25 | MF | UZB | Sardor Sotvoldiev (from (Uzbekistan) FK Kosonsoy) |
| 21 | FW | UZB | Shakhboz Erkinov (from (Uzbekistan) FC Pakhtakor) |
| 10 | FW | UZB | Moydin Mamazulunov (from (Uzbekistan) FK Andijan) |

Out: Note: Flags indicate national team as defined under FIFA eligibility rules; some limited exceptions apply. Players may hold more than one non-FIFA nationality.

| No. | Pos. | Nation | Player |
|---|---|---|---|
| — | GK | TKM | Pavel Kharchik |
| — | GK | UZB | Timur Ganiev (to (Uzbekistan) Lokomotiv Tashkent) |
| — | DF | UZB | Siroj Hamroev (to (Uzbekistan) Sogdiana Jizzakh) |
| — | DF | UZB | Timur Yafarov (to (Uzbekistan) Qizilqum Zarafshon) |
| — | DF | UZB | Shuhrаt Musаev |
| — | MF | RUS | Artem Nikitenko |
| — | MF | UZB | Suhrob Berdiev (from (Uzbekistan) Sogdiana Jizzakh) |
| — | MF | UZB | Timur Ayzatullov (to (Uzbekistan) Qizilqum Zarafshon) |
| — | MF | UZB | Oleg Zoteev (to (Uzbekistan) FC Bunyodkor) |
| — | FW | UZB | Nosirbek Otakuziev (end of loan from (Uzbekistan) Nasaf Qarshi) |
| — | FW | UZB | Aleksandr Vostrikov (to (Uzbekistan) FC Shurtan Guzar) |
| — | FW | UZB | Zafar Kholmurodov (retired) |
| 12 | FW | UZB | Oleksandr Lupashko |
| — | FW | UZB | Arsen Tyulenev |

==== Pakhtakor ====
In: Note: Flags indicate national team as defined under FIFA eligibility rules; some limited exceptions apply. Players may hold more than one non-FIFA nationality.

| No. | Pos. | Nation | Player |
|---|---|---|---|
| 10 | MF | ARM | Zhora Hovhannisyan (from (Uzbekistan) Lokomotiv Tashkent) |
| — | DF | UZB | Temur Kagirov (loan return from (Uzbekistan) Qizilqum Zarafshon) |
| 21 | DF | UZB | Ildar Mamatkazin (from (Uzbekistan) FK Andijan) |
| — | DF | UZB | Asilbek Mansurov (loan return from (Uzbekistan) FK Guliston) |
| — | DF | UZB | Anvar Rajabov (from (Thailand) Buriram United) |
| — | MF | UZB | Azamat Bobojonov (loan return from (Uzbekistan) Qizilqum Zarafshon) |
| — | DF | UZB | Akmal Kholmurodov (loan return from (Uzbekistan) FK Buxoro) |
| 23 | MF | UZB | Aleksandr Merzlyakov (from (Uzbekistan) Shurtan Guzar) |
| 3 | MF | UZB | Gulom Urunov (loan return from (Uzbekistan) Qizilqum Zarafshon) |
| — | FW | UZB | Ruzimboy Ahmedov (loan return from (Uzbekistan) FK Samarqand-Dinamo) |
| — | FW | UZB | Bakhriddin Vakhobov (loan return from (Uzbekistan) FK Andijan) |
| 18 | FW | UZB | Sanat Shikhov (loan return from (Uzbekistan) Qizilqum Zarafshon) |
| — | MF | UZB | Anvar Rakhimov (loan return from (Uzbekistan) FK Andijan) |

Out: Note: Flags indicate national team as defined under FIFA eligibility rules; some limited exceptions apply. Players may hold more than one non-FIFA nationality.

| No. | Pos. | Nation | Player |
|---|---|---|---|
| — | GK | UZB | Nodir Ashurmatov (on loan to (Uzbekistan) Sogdiana Jizzakh) |
| — | GK | UZB | Sergey Smorodin (on loan to (Uzbekistan) FK Andijan) |
| — | GK | UZB | Eldor Tajibaev (on loan to (Uzbekistan) Qizilqum Zarafshon) |
| — | GK | UZB | Akmal Tursunboev (on loan to (Uzbekistan) FK Dinamo Samarqand) |
| — | DF | MNE | Sanibal Orahovac (to (Montenegro) FK Mladost Podgorica, end of contract) |
| — | DF | UZB | Temur Kagirov (to (Uzbekistan) Olmaliq FK) |
| — | DF | UZB | Aleksandr Kletskov (to (Uzbekistan) FK Dinamo Samarqand) |
| — | DF | UZB | Akmal Kholmurodov (on loan to (Uzbekistan) FK Dinamo Samarqand) |
| — | DF | UZB | Tokhir Shamshitdinov (on loan to (Uzbekistan) FK Guliston) |
| — | DF | UZB | Azamat Abdullaev (on loan to (Uzbekistan) Qizilqum Zarafshon) |
| — | MF | UZB | Akram Bakhridtinov (on loan to (Uzbekistan) Navbahor Namangan) |
| — | MF | UZB | Anvar Rakhimov (on loan to (Uzbekistan) Sogdiana Jizzakh) |
| — | MF | UZB | Azamat Bobojonov (on loan to (Uzbekistan) FK Dinamo Samarqand) |
| — | MF | UZB | Nodir Kamolov (to (Uzbekistan) Neftchi Farg'ona) |
| — | MF | UZB | Sherzod Karimov (on loan to (China) Qingdao Jonoon) |
| — | FW | UZB | Alisher Azizov (on loan to (Uzbekistan) FK Buxoro) |
| — | FW | UZB | Ruzimboy Ahmedov (to (Uzbekistan) Navbahor Namangan) |
| — | FW | UZB | Shakhboz Erkinov (to (Uzbekistan) Olmaliq FK) |
| — | FW | UZB | Egor Krimets (on loan to (China) Beijing Guoan) |
| — | FW | UZB | Timur Khakimov (on loan to (Uzbekistan) FK Andijan) |
| — | FW | UZB | Bahriddin Vahobov (on loan to (Uzbekistan) FK Buxoro) |
| — | FW | UZB | Farrukh Shotursunov (on loan to (Uzbekistan) Qizilqum Zarafshon) |
| — | | UZB | Bobur Doniyorov (on loan to (Uzbekistan) Sherdor) |
| — | | UZB | Bobur Iskandarov (on loan to (Uzbekistan) Zarafshon Navoi) |

==== Qizilqum Zarafshon ====
In: Note: Flags indicate national team as defined under FIFA eligibility rules; some limited exceptions apply. Players may hold more than one non-FIFA nationality.

| No. | Pos. | Nation | Player |
|---|---|---|---|
| 70 | GK | UZB | Eldor Tajibaev (on loan from (Uzbekistan) FC Pakhtakor) |
| 2 | DF | UZB | Timur Yafarov (from (Uzbekistan) Olmaliq FK) |
| 3 | DF | UZB | Alisher Turdiev (from (Uzbekistan) Nasaf-2) |
| 4 | DF | UZB | Azamat Abdullaev (on loan from (Uzbekistan) FC Pakhtakor) |
| 12 | MF | UZB | Timur Ayzatullov (from (Uzbekistan) Olmaliq FK) |
| 15 | MF | UZB | Muqimjon Toshmatov (from (Uzbekistan) FK Andijan) |
| 19 | MF | UZB | Yannis Mandzukas (from (Uzbekistan) FC Bunyodkor) |
| 21 | MF | UZB | Ghulomhaydar Ghulomov (from (Uzbekistan) Mash'al Mubarek) |
| 8 | FW | UZB | Farrukh Shotursunov (on loan from (Uzbekistan) FC Pakhtakor) |
| 9 | FW | UZB | Olim Navkarov (from (Uzbekistan) FK Dinamo Samarqand) |
| 11 | FW | UZB | Navruz Olimov (from (Uzbekistan) FK Dinamo Samarqand) |

Out: Note: Flags indicate national team as defined under FIFA eligibility rules; some limited exceptions apply. Players may hold more than one non-FIFA nationality.

| No. | Pos. | Nation | Player |
|---|---|---|---|
| — | GK | UZB | Artyom Makosin (to (Uzbekistan) Zarafshon Navoi) |
| — | GK | UZB | Oleg Gorvits (to (Uzbekistan) FK Dinamo Samarqand) |
| — | GK | LTU | Pavelas Leusas (to (Uzbekistan) FC Shurtan Guzar) |
| — | DF | UZB | Azamat Bobojonov (end of loan from (Uzbekistan) FC Pakhtakor) |
| — | DF | UZB | Temur Kagirov (end of loan from (Uzbekistan) FC Pakhtakor) |
| — | DF | UZB | Akmal Kholiqov (to (Uzbekistan) Zarafshon Navoi) |
| — | DF | UZB | Akmal Rustamov (to (Uzbekistan) Olmaliq FK) |
| — | MF | UZB | Sherali Juraev (to (Uzbekistan) Olmaliq FK) |
| — | MF | UZB | Muzaffar Umrzoqov (to (Uzbekistan) FC Shurtan Guzar) |
| — | MF | UZB | Gulom Urunov (end of loan from (Uzbekistan) FC Pakhtakor) |
| — | FW | UZB | Sanat Shikhov (end of loan from (Uzbekistan) FC Pakhtakor) |
| — | FW | UZB | Alisher Kholiqov (to (Uzbekistan) Zarafshon Navoi) |

==== Sogdiana Jizzakh ====
In: Note: Flags indicate national team as defined under FIFA eligibility rules; some limited exceptions apply. Players may hold more than one non-FIFA nationality.

| No. | Pos. | Nation | Player |
|---|---|---|---|
| 1 | GK | MDA | Alexandru Melenciuc (from (Moldova) FC Speranța Crihana Veche) |
| 12 | GK | UZB | Nodir Ashurmatov (from (Uzbekistan) FC Pakhtakor) |
| 22 | DF | UZB | Orif Mamajonov (from (Uzbekistan) FC Bunyodkor) |
| 25 | DF | UZB | Sardor Qakhorov (from (Uzbekistan) FC Bunyodkor) |
| 19 | DF | UZB | Siroj Hamroev (from (Uzbekistan) Olmaliq FK) |
| 20 | DF | UZB | Durbek Umaraliev (from (Uzbekistan) Navbahor Namangan) |
| 18 | MF | UZB | Suhrob Berdiev (from (Uzbekistan) Olmaliq FK) |
| 14 | MF | UZB | Rinat Bayramov (from (Uzbekistan) Navbahor Namangan) |
| 15 | MF | UZB | Anvar Rakhimov (on loan from (Uzbekistan) FC Pakhtakor, from FK Andijan) |
| 2 | MF | UZB | Javadullo Ibrohimov (from (Uzbekistan) Metallurg Bekabad) |
| 39 | MF | UZB | Jahongir Mustafoqulov (from (Uzbekistan) Ghallakor) |

Out: Note: Flags indicate national team as defined under FIFA eligibility rules; some limited exceptions apply. Players may hold more than one non-FIFA nationality.

| No. | Pos. | Nation | Player |

==== Shurtan Guzar ====
In: Note: Flags indicate national team as defined under FIFA eligibility rules; some limited exceptions apply. Players may hold more than one non-FIFA nationality.

| No. | Pos. | Nation | Player |
|---|---|---|---|
| 1 | GK | LTU | Pavelas Leusas (from (Uzbekistan) Qizilqum Zarafshon) |
| 3 | DF | UZB | Shavkat Raimqulov (from (Uzbekistan) Nasaf Qarshi) |
| 4 | DF | UZB | Jamol Otakulov (from (Uzbekistan) FK Dinamo Samarqand) |
| 18 | MF | UZB | Dilyaver Abibullaev (from (Uzbekistan) FK Dinamo Samarqand) |
| 9 | MF | UZB | Shukur Jumaboev (from (Uzbekistan) Neftchi Farg'ona) |
| 19 | MF | UZB | Ibrohim Otahanov (from (Uzbekistan) FK Andijan) |
| 14 | MF | UZB | Aziz Mansurov (from (Uzbekistan) Istiqlol Toshkent) |
| 21 | MF | UZB | Zokhid Raupov (from (Uzbekistan) Navbahor Namangan) |
| 7 | MF | UZB | Muzaffar Umrzoqov (to (Uzbekistan) Qizilqum Zarafshon) |
| 8 | FW | LTU | Artūras Fomenka (from (Uzbekistan) Lokomotiv Tashkent) |
| 10 | FW | UZB | Pavel Solomin (from (Uzbekistan) Mash'al Mubarek) |
| 20 | FW | UZB | Aleksandr Vostrikov (from (Uzbekistan) Olmaliq FK) |

Out: Note: Flags indicate national team as defined under FIFA eligibility rules; some limited exceptions apply. Players may hold more than one non-FIFA nationality.

| No. | Pos. | Nation | Player |
|---|---|---|---|
| — | DF | UZB | Rahmatulla Berdimurodov (end of loan from (Uzbekistan) Nasaf Qarshi) |
| — | DF | UZB | Laziz Ubaydullaev (to (Uzbekistan) Nasaf Qarshi) |
| — | MF | UZB | Vadim Afonin (to (Russia) Salyut Belgorod) |
| — | MF | NGA | Patrick Agboh |
| — | MF | UZB | Aleksandr Merzlyakov (to (Uzbekistan) FC Pakhtakor) |
| — | MF | CIV | Taïna Adama Soro (to (Belarus) Shakhtyor Soligorsk) |
| — | FW | UZB | Igor Taran (to (Uzbekistan) FC Bunyodkor) |
| — | FW | UZB | Farhod Tojiyev (to (Uzbekistan) Lokomotiv Tashkent) |

=== First League ===
==== FK Andijan ====
In: Note: Flags indicate national team as defined under FIFA eligibility rules; some limited exceptions apply. Players may hold more than one non-FIFA nationality.

| No. | Pos. | Nation | Player |
|---|---|---|---|
| — | GK | UZB | Sergey Smorodin (on loan from (Uzbekistan) FC Pakhtakor) |
| — | MF | UZB | Asqar Jadigerov (from (Uzbekistan) FK Dinamo Samarqand) |

Out: Note: Flags indicate national team as defined under FIFA eligibility rules; some limited exceptions apply. Players may hold more than one non-FIFA nationality.

| No. | Pos. | Nation | Player |
|---|---|---|---|
| — | DF | UZB | Maqsud Hayitov (end of loan from (Uzbekistan) Nasaf Qarshi) |
| — | DF | UZB | Ildar Mamatkazin (to (Uzbekistan) FC Pakhtakor) |
| — | MF | UZB | Otabek Valijonov (to (Uzbekistan) FK Buxoro) |
| — | MF | UZB | Ibrohim Otahanov (to (Uzbekistan) FC Shurtan Guzar) |
| — | MF | UZB | Muqimjon Toshmatov (to (Uzbekistan) Qizilqum Zarafshon) |
| — | MF | UZB | Anvar Rakhimov (end of loan from (Uzbekistan) FC Pakhtakor) |
| — | FW | UZB | Moydin Mamazulunov (to (Uzbekistan) Olmaliq FK) |

==== Mash'al Mubarek ====
In: Note: Flags indicate national team as defined under FIFA eligibility rules; some limited exceptions apply. Players may hold more than one non-FIFA nationality.

| No. | Pos. | Nation | Player |

Out: Note: Flags indicate national team as defined under FIFA eligibility rules; some limited exceptions apply. Players may hold more than one non-FIFA nationality.

| No. | Pos. | Nation | Player |
|---|---|---|---|
| — | DF | KAZ | Ilya Fomitchev (to (Kazakhstan) FC Vostok) |
| — | DF | TKM | Alik Haydarov |
| — | MF | SRB | Milorad Resanovic |
| — | MF | UZB | Igor Petković (to (Uzbekistan) Olmaliq FK) |
| — | MF | UZB | Samandar Shodmonov (to (Uzbekistan) Olmaliq FK) |
| — | MF | UZB | Muhammadjon Abdullaev (to (Uzbekistan) Navbahor Namangan) |
| — | MF | UZB | Ghulomhaydar Ghulomov (to (Uzbekistan) Qizilqum Zarafshon) |
| — | MF | UZB | Yannis Mandzukas (end of loan from (Uzbekistan) FC Bunyodkor) |
| — | MF | UZB | Shuhrat Muhammadiev (to (Uzbekistan) Nasaf Qarshi) |
| — | MF | UZB | Samandar Shodmonov (to (Uzbekistan) Olmaliq FK) |
| — | MF | UZB | Temur Dadashev (to (Uzbekistan) FK Dinamo Samarqand) |
| — | FW | UZB | Pavel Solomin (to (Uzbekistan) FC Shurtan Guzar) |

==== Oqtepa Toshkent ====
In: Note: Flags indicate national team as defined under FIFA eligibility rules; some limited exceptions apply. Players may hold more than one non-FIFA nationality.

| No. | Pos. | Nation | Player |
|---|---|---|---|
| — | MF | UZB | Ildar Magdeev (from (Uzbekistan) Lokomotiv Tashkent) |

Out: Note: Flags indicate national team as defined under FIFA eligibility rules; some limited exceptions apply. Players may hold more than one non-FIFA nationality.

| No. | Pos. | Nation | Player |

==== Zarafshon Navoi ====
In: Note: Flags indicate national team as defined under FIFA eligibility rules; some limited exceptions apply. Players may hold more than one non-FIFA nationality.

| No. | Pos. | Nation | Player |
|---|---|---|---|
| — | | UZB | Bobur Doniyorov (on loan from (Uzbekistan) FC Pakhtakor) |

Out: Note: Flags indicate national team as defined under FIFA eligibility rules; some limited exceptions apply. Players may hold more than one non-FIFA nationality.

| No. | Pos. | Nation | Player |

== Summer 2013 ==
=== By date ===
As of 15 August 2013

| Date | Name | Pos. | Moving from | Moving to | Fee | Note |
|---|---|---|---|---|---|---|
| June 23, 2013 | (Uzbekistan) Kamoliddin Murzoev | FW | Bunyodkor | (Kazakhstan) Irtysh Pavlodar | | |
| June 28, 2013 | (Uzbekistan) Anvar Berdiev | FW | Neftchi Farg'ona | Bunyodkor | | |
| July 12, 2013 | (Uzbekistan) Aleksandr Kletskov | DF | FK Dinamo Samarqand | (Turkey) Orduspor | | |
| July 12, 2013 | (Uzbekistan) Ilhom Suyunov | DF | Pakhtakor | Lokomotiv Tashkent | | |
| July 18, 2013 | (Uzbekistan) Anvarjon Soliev | FW | Bunyodkor | Pakhtakor | | |
| July 19, 2013 | (Uzbekistan) Fozil Musaev | MF | Bunyodkor | (Qatar) Muaither SC | | |
| July 21, 2013 | (Uzbekistan) Sanzhar Tursunov | MF | Lokomotiv Tashkent | (Russia) Gazovik Orenburg | | |
| July 25, 2013 | (Uzbekistan) Gulom Urunov | DF | Pakhtakor | Neftchi Farg'ona | Loan | |
| August 1, 2013 | (Belarus) Yury Ryzhko | DF | (Belarus) Slutsk | FK Buxoro | | |
| August 1, 2013 | (Uzbekistan) Ibrokhim Rakhimov | MF | FK Guliston | Lokomotiv Tashkent | End of loan | |
| August 1, 2013 | (Uzbekistan) Sobir Usmonkhujaev | MF | FK Guliston | Lokomotiv Tashkent | End of loan | |
| August 1, 2013 | (Moldova) Alexandru Onica | MF | (Moldova) Sheriff Tiraspol | Lokomotiv Tashkent | | |
| August 2, 2013 | (Uzbekistan) Eldor Tajibaev | GK | Qizilqum Zarafshon | Pakhtakor | End of Loan | |
| August 2, 2013 | (Uzbekistan) Eldor Tajibaev | GK | Pakhtakor | Shurtan Guzar | Loan | |
| August 2, 2013 | (Uzbekistan) Boburbek Yuldashov | DF | Lokomotiv Tashkent | (Turkey) Manisaspor | | |
| August 2, 2013 | (Uzbekistan) Andrey Vlasichev | MF | Qizilqum Zarafshon | Shurtan Guzar | | |
| August 2, 2013 | (Uzbekistan) Aziz Alijonov | MF | Neftchi Farg'ona | Shurtan Guzar | | |
| August 5, 2013 | (Russia) Evgeniy Gogol | DF | Olmaliq FK | Lokomotiv Tashkent | | |
| August 5, 2013 | (Uzbekistan) Moydin Mamazulunov | FW | FK Olmaliq | FK Guliston | | |
| August 5, 2013 | (Uzbekistan) Sergey Rekun | FW | Pakhtakor | FK Guliston | Loan | |
| August 5, 2013 | (Uzbekistan) Shukur Jumaboev | MF | Shurtan Guzar | FK Guliston | | |
| August 5, 2013 | (Uzbekistan) Ildar Mamatkazin | DF | Pakhtakor | FK Dinamo Samarqand | Loan | |
| August 5, 2013 | (Uzbekistan) Azamat Abdullaev | DF | Pakhtakor | FK Dinamo Samarqand | Loan | |
| August 5, 2013 | (Uzbekistan) Farrukh Shotursunov | MF | Pakhtakor | FK Dinamo Samarqand | Loan | |
| August 5, 2013 | (Uzbekistan) Sanat Shikhov | FW | Pakhtakor | FK Dinamo Samarqand | Loan | |
| August 5, 2013 | (Uzbekistan) Ildar Magdeev | MF | Oqtepa Toshkent | FK Dinamo Samarqand | | |
| August 5, 2013 | (Uzbekistan) Oybek Nurboev | DF | Neftchi Farg'ona | FK Dinamo Samarqand | | |
| August 5, 2013 | (Uzbekistan) Alisher Samatov | DF | Qizilqum Zarafshon | FK Dinamo Samarqand | | |
| August 5, 2013 | (Uzbekistan) Avaz Agaliev | DF | Qizilqum Zarafshon | FK Dinamo Samarqand | | |
| August 5, 2013 | (Uzbekistan) Omad Tayloqov | MF | FK Yangiyer | FK Dinamo Samarqand | | |
| August 15, 2013 | (Uzbekistan) Azamat Niyazov | MF | | FK Dinamo Samarqand | | |
| August 15, 2013 | (Uzbekistan) Khamroz Abduganiev | FW | | FK Dinamo Samarqand | | |
| August 15, 2013 | (Uzbekistan) Samandar Shodmonov | MF | Olmaliq FK | Nasaf Qarshi | | |
| August 15, 2013 | (Uzbekistan) Fayoz Azimqulov | MF | | Nasaf Qarshi | | |
| August 15, 2013 | (Uzbekistan) Javlon Egamov | MF | | Nasaf Qarshi | | |
| August 15, 2013 | (Uzbekistan) Sherzod Karimov | MF | (China) Qingdao Jonoon | Pakhtakor | End of loan | |
| August 15, 2013 | (Uzbekistan) Timur Khakimov | FW | FK Andijon | Pakhtakor | End of loan | |
| August 15, 2013 | (Uzbekistan) Viktor Grigoriev | DF | | Pakhtakor | | |
| August 15, 2013 | (Uzbekistan) Mansurbek Maksudov | DF | | Metallurg Bekabad | | |
| August 15, 2013 | (Uzbekistan) Beruni Abdunabiev | FW | | Metallurg Bekabad | | |
| August 15, 2013 | (Uzbekistan) Azizbek Alimov | FW | | Metallurg Bekabad | | |
| August 15, 2013 | (Uzbekistan) Obid Juraboev | DF | Shurtan Guzar | FK Olmaliq | | |
| August 15, 2013 | (Uzbekistan) Dilyaver Abibullaev | MF | Shurtan Guzar | FK Olmaliq | | |
| August 15, 2013 | (Uzbekistan) Olim Navkarov | FW | Qizilqum Zarafshon | FK Olmaliq | | |
| August 15, 2013 | (Georgia (country)) Giorgi Kvesieshvili | FW | FK Buxoro | FK Olmaliq | | |
| August 15, 2013 | (Uzbekistan) Ilya Ilyin | DF | Qizilqum Zarafshon | FK Buxoro | | |
| August 15, 2013 | (Uzbekistan) Azamat Sharipov | DF | Pakhtakor | FK Buxoro | Loan | |
| August 15, 2013 | (Uzbekistan) Abdukakhkhor Khojiakbarov | DF | Bunyodkor | FK Buxoro | | |
| August 15, 2013 | (Uzbekistan) Bahodir Pardaev | FW | Bunyodkor | FK Buxoro | Loan | |
| August 15, 2013 | (Lithuania) Pavelas Leusas | GK | Shurtan Guzar | Navbahor Namangan | | |
| August 15, 2013 | (Uzbekistan) Timur Yafarov | DF | Qizilqum Zarafshon | Navbahor Namangan | | |
| August 15, 2013 | (Uzbekistan) Durbek Umaraliev | DF | Sogdiana Jizzakh | Navbahor Namangan | | |
| August 15, 2013 | (Uzbekistan) Rustam Azamov | DF | Lokomotiv Tashkent | Navbahor Namangan | | |
| August 15, 2013 | (Uzbekistan) Oyatilla Muhiddinov | MF | Pakhtakor | Navbahor Namangan | Loan | |
| August 15, 2013 | (Uzbekistan) Islom Ismailov | MF | Pakhtakor | Navbahor Namangan | Loan | |
| August 15, 2013 | (Uzbekistan) Oleksandr Lupashko | FW | FK Olmaliq | Navbahor Namangan | | |
| August 15, 2013 | (Uzbekistan) Ayubkhon Gapparov | FW | (Russia) Neftekhimik Nizhnekamsk | Navbahor Namangan | | |
| August 15, 2013 | (Uzbekistan) Hislat Chilmatov | GK | FK Guliston | Neftchi Farg'ona | | |
| August 15, 2013 | (Uzbekistan) Ghayrat Khasanov | GK | Nasaf Qarshi | Neftchi Farg'ona | | |
| August 15, 2013 | (Uzbekistan) Abdumajid Toirov | DF | Navbahor Namangan | Neftchi Farg'ona | | |
| August 15, 2013 | (Uzbekistan) Vyacheslav Ponomarev | DF | Shurtan Guzar | Neftchi Farg'ona | | |
| August 15, 2013 | (Uzbekistan) Mirzakamol Kamolov | MF | Nasaf Qarshi | Neftchi Farg'ona | | |
| August 15, 2013 | (Uzbekistan) Nosirbek Otakuziev | FW | FK Guliston | Neftchi Farg'ona | | |
| August 15, 2013 | (Uzbekistan) Zaynitdin Tadjiyev | FW | Lokomotiv Tashkent | Neftchi Farg'ona | | |
| August 15, 2013 | (Uzbekistan) Pavel Smolyachenko | FW | Lokomotiv Tashkent | Neftchi Farg'ona | | |
| August 15, 2013 | (Uzbekistan) Rasuljon Shukhratov | FW | Navbahor Namangan | Sogiana Jizzakh | | |
| August 15, 2013 | (Uzbekistan) Nodir Ashurmatov | . | Pakhtakor | Sogiana Jizzakh | Loan | |
| August 15, 2013 | (Uzbekistan) Akmal Tursunbaev | GK | FK Dinamo Samarqand | Pakhtakor | End of Loan | |
| August 15, 2013 | (Uzbekistan) Akmal Tursunbaev | GK | Pakhtakor | FK Andijan | Loan | |
| August 15, 2013 | (Uzbekistan) Davlatbek Yarbekov | MF | Pakhtakor | Kokand 1912 | Loan | |
| August 15, 2013 | (Uzbekistan) Izzat Abdullaev | MF | Pakhtakor | Zarafshon Navoi | Loan | |
| August 15, 2013 | (Uzbekistan) Abdulaziz Jurabaev | . | Pakhtakor | Zarafshon Navoi | Loan | |
| August 15, 2013 | (Uzbekistan) Abdurakhman Abdulhakov | . | Pakhtakor | Zarafshon Navoi | Loan | |
| August 15, 2013 | (Uzbekistan) Artyom Makosin | GK | Zarafshon Navoi | Qizilqum Zarafshon | | |
| August 15, 2013 | (Uzbekistan) Akmal Kholiqov | DF | Zarafshon Navoi | Qizilqum Zarafshon | | |
| August 15, 2013 | (Uzbekistan) Alisher Kholiqov | FW | Zarafshon Navoi | Qizilqum Zarafshon | | |
| August 15, 2013 | (Uzbekistan) Jalil Kimsamov | DF | Sogdiana Jizzakh | Qizilqum Zarafshon | | |
| August 15, 2013 | (Uzbekistan) Khurshid Yuldoshev | FW | Sogdiana Jizzakh | Qizilqum Zarafshon | | |
| August 15, 2013 | (Uzbekistan) Eldor Boymatov | DF | Nasaf Qarshi | Qizilqum Zarafshon | | |
| August 15, 2013 | (Uzbekistan) Akmal Rustamov | DF | FK Olmaliq | Qizilqum Zarafshon | | |
| August 15, 2013 | (Uzbekistan) Zafar Turaev | MF | FK Olmaliq | Qizilqum Zarafshon | | |
| August 15, 2013 | (Uzbekistan) Isroil Ergashev | MF | FK Olmaliq | Qizilqum Zarafshon | | |

== See also ==
- 2013 Uzbek League
- List of Uzbek football transfers 2010
- List of Uzbek football transfers 2011
- List of Uzbek football transfers 2012
