= Alik =

Alik may refer to:

== People ==
Given name

- Alik Arakelyan (born 1996), Armenian footballer
- Alik Cavaliere (1926–1998), Italian sculptor
- Alik Gershon (born 1980), Ukraine-born Israeli chess grandmaster
- Alik Gunashian or Gyunashyan (born 1955), Armenian singer
- Alik Haýdarow (born 1981), Turkmenistan footballer
- Alik Magin, Australian rules footballer
- Alik Sakharov (born 1959), American film and television director and cinematographer

Surname

- Alik Alik (born 1953), diplomat and politician from the Federated States of Micronesia
- Daisy Alik-Momotaro, Marshallese politician
- SA Haque Alik, Bangladeshi film director, screenwriter and composer

== Media ==
- Alik (daily), Armenian Iranian daily newspaper

== See also ==
- Əlik, a village and municipality in the Quba Rayon of Azerbaijan
- Alik Sukh, English title Unreal Happiness, 2013 Indian Bengali thriller film
