= Jek carpets =

Type of carpet

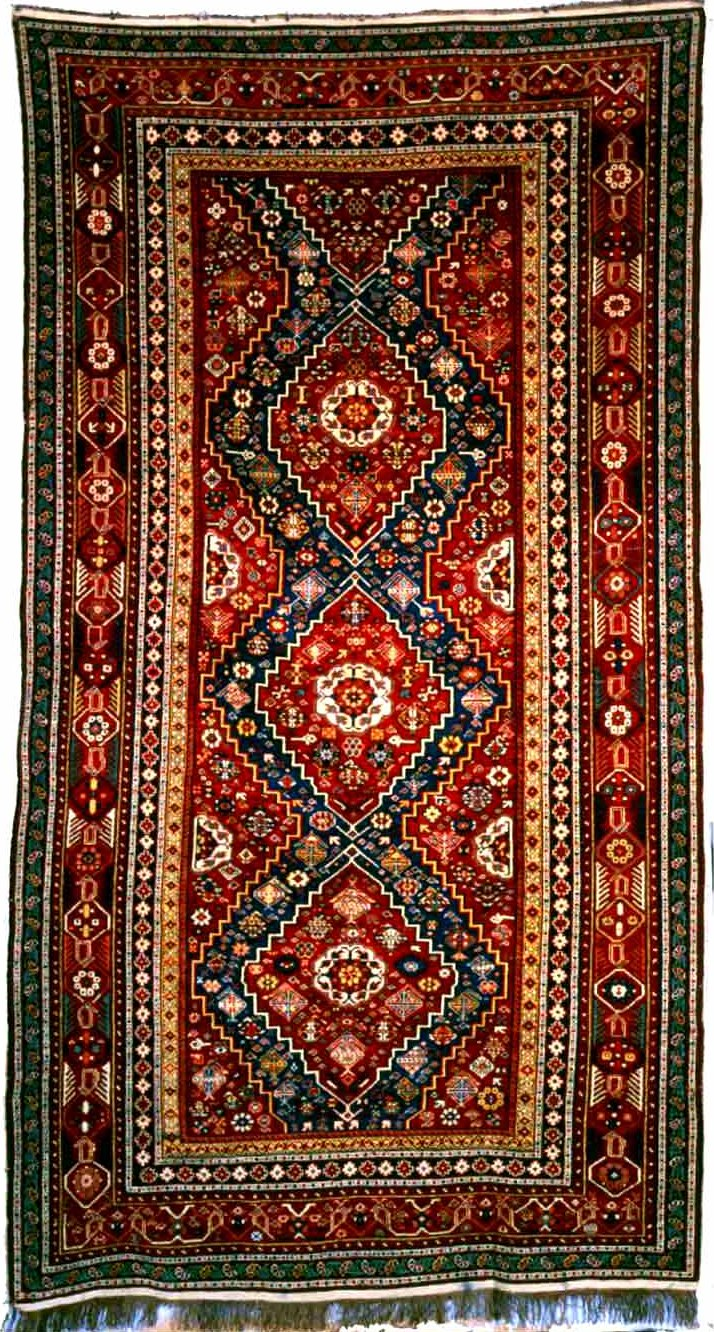
Jek rug, Quba carpet school, 19th century

Jek carpets (Azerbaijani: Cek xalçaları) – is a term used for lint-free and pile carpets woven by Jek people living in Quba Rayon, Azerbaijan. These carpets are included in the Kuba group of Shirvan type and are named in honour of Jek village of Quba Rayon. Foreign art critics mistakenly called these carpets "Dagestani".

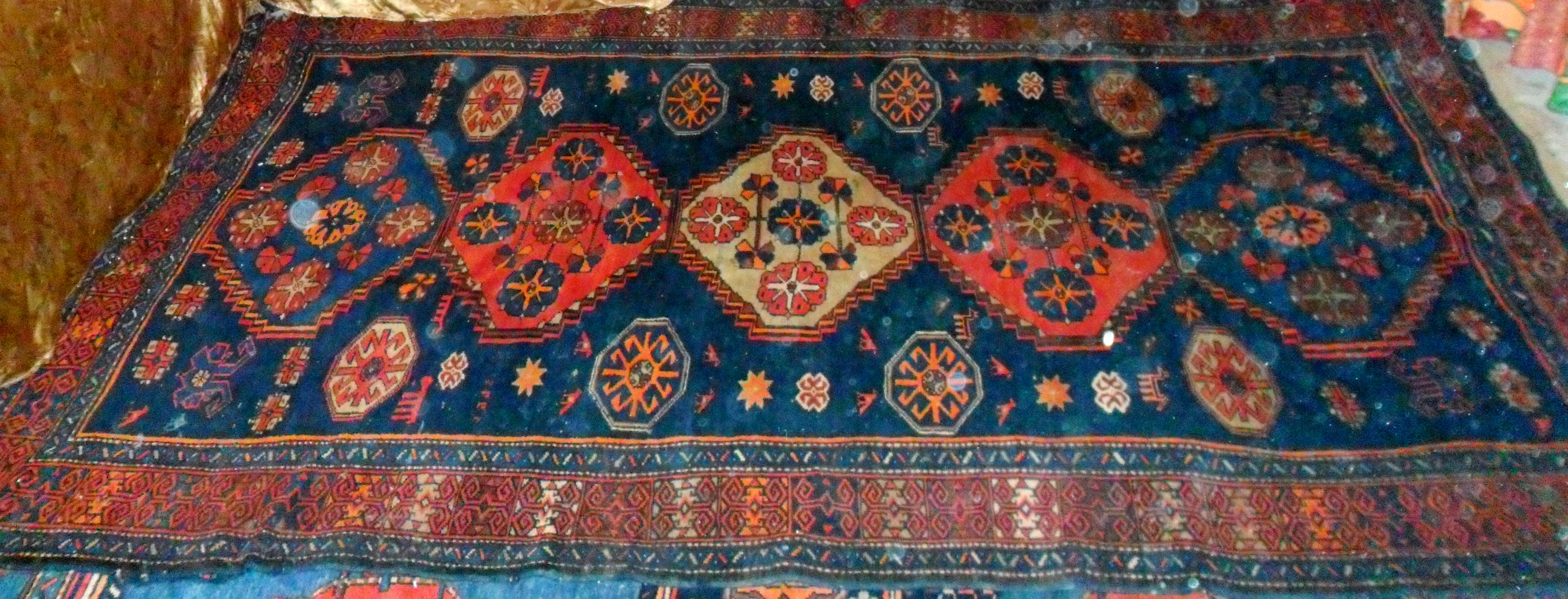
Jek carpet
