= Əlik =

- Municipality
- Location within Azerbaijan
- Coordinates: 41°10′39″N 48°14′13″E
- Country: Azerbaijan
- Rayon: Quba

Population
  - Total: 1,069
- Time zone: UTC+4 (AZT)
  - Summer (DST): UTC+5 (AZT)
- Postal code: AZ 4016

Əlik is a village and municipality in the Quba Rayon of Azerbaijan. It has a population of 1,069. The postal code is AZ 4016. The municipality consists of the villages of Əlik, Cek, and Haput.

== Population ==
Although the village used to have a large population, it is now almost empty and becoming more deserted each year. The residents live in houses with barns around them for keeping livestock.
