= Alik Gunashian =

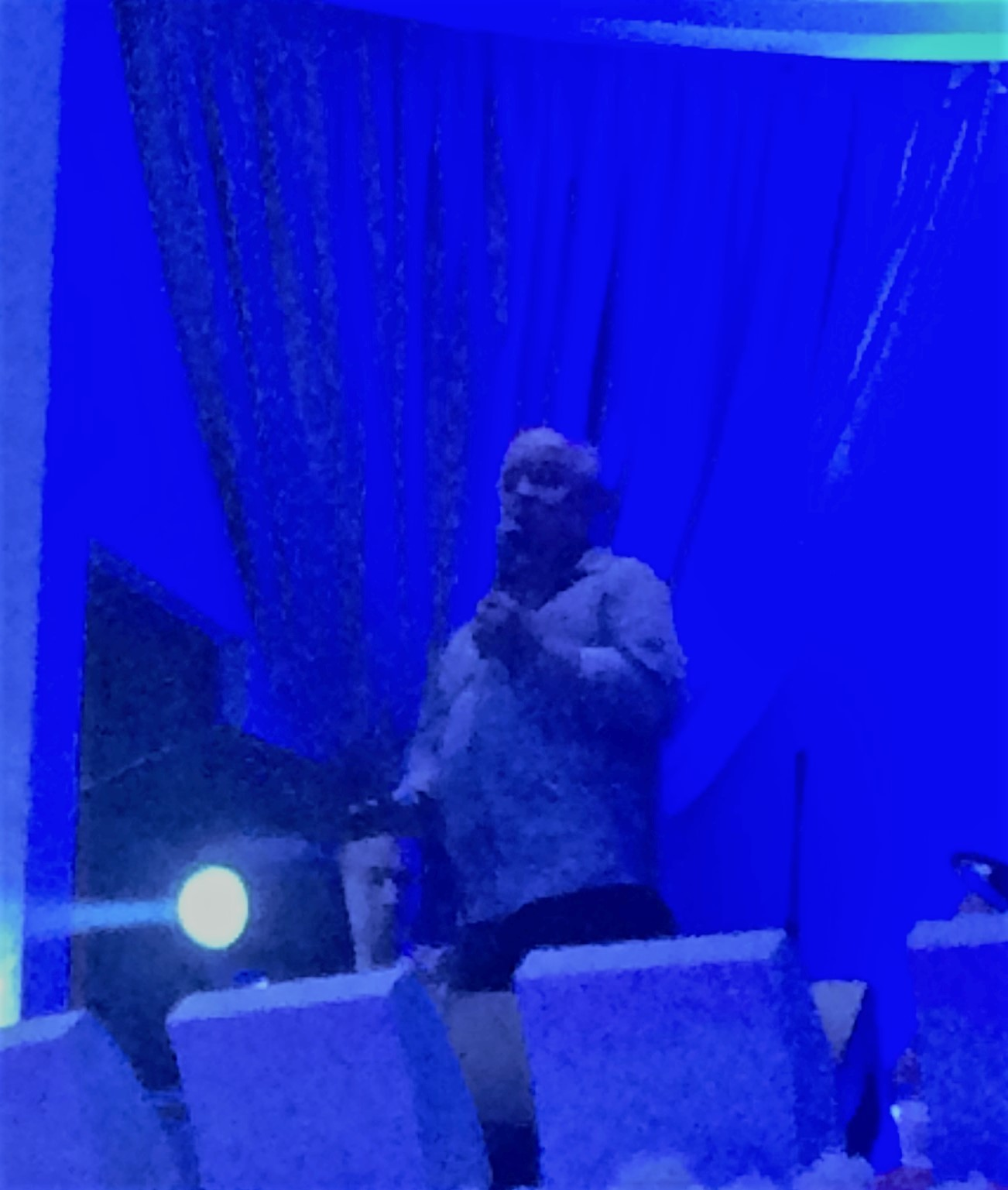
- Alik Gunashian performing at a restaurant in 2017

Background information
- Born: December 8, 1954 (age 71); Leninakan, Armenian SSR, Soviet Union
- Genres: Pop; rabiz
- Occupation: Singer
- Instrument: Vocals
- Years active: 1970s–present

Alik Yashayi Gunashian or Gyunashyan (Armenian: Ալիկ Յաշայի Գյունաշյան; born December 8, 1954) is an Armenian popular singer.

He started his career in the local clubs and restaurants of Leninakan (now called Gyumri) as an amateur singer. His bootlegs and unofficial MC-recordings made his name popular since the Soviet times. Among his most famous songs were "Leninakan", "Dzerutyun", "Yerkrasharzh", "Dadarel en jragners", "Dajan kyank e", and "Mi dzaghik er". After the 1988 Spitak earthquake, he moved to Los Angeles, where he formed a folk band and recorded a number of CD's.

== Discography ==
=== Studio albums ===
- "Tarinerov sharunak" (1997)
- "Chi hognel Haye" (1997)
- "Antsan orere" (1998)
- "Mi aragil" (1998)
- "Im Nona" (2000)
- "De ari yar" (2001)
- "Gusanakan husher" (2005)
- «50» (2005)
- «2007» (2007)
- "Surb Mayrer" (2010)

=== Compilation albums ===
- "The Very Best" (2008)
- "The Best" (2012)
