= Jek (Quba) =

Cek
- Location within Azerbaijan
- Coordinates: 41°11′49″N 48°14′30″E
- Country: Azerbaijan
- Rayon: Quba
- Municipality: Əlik
- Time zone: UTC+4 (AZT)
  - Summer (DST): UTC+5 (AZT)

Cek (also, Jek, Dzheg and Dzhek) is a village in the Quba Rayon of Azerbaijan. The village forms part of the municipality of Əlik. They live, primarily, in the region around Mount Shahdagh in Quba Rayon in northeastern Azerbaijan.

== Population ==
In 1886 their population was estimated at 7,767.

In 1926 their population was estimated at 607. Although only 607 individuals claimed Jek ethnicity, 4,348 listed Jek as their native language. These were probably Jeks who listed themselves as Azerbaijanis speaking Dzhek as their native language.

Although the village used to have a large population, it is now almost empty and becoming more deserted each year.

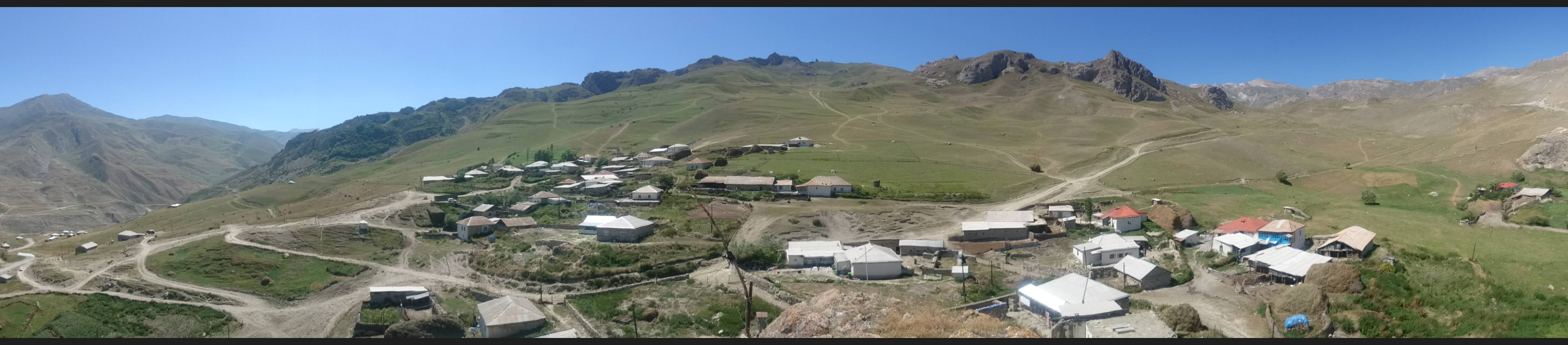
Panorama, 2016

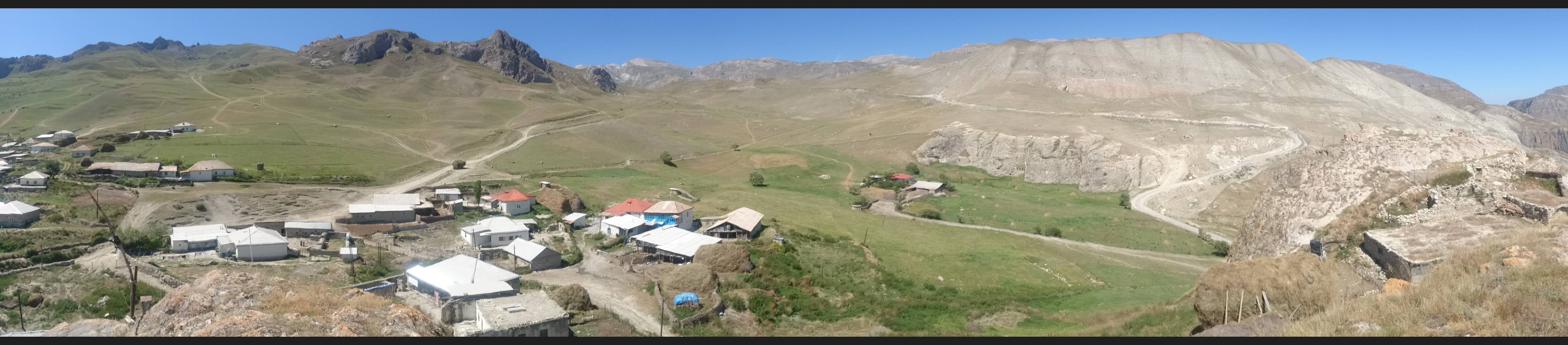
Panorama, 2016

== Gallery ==
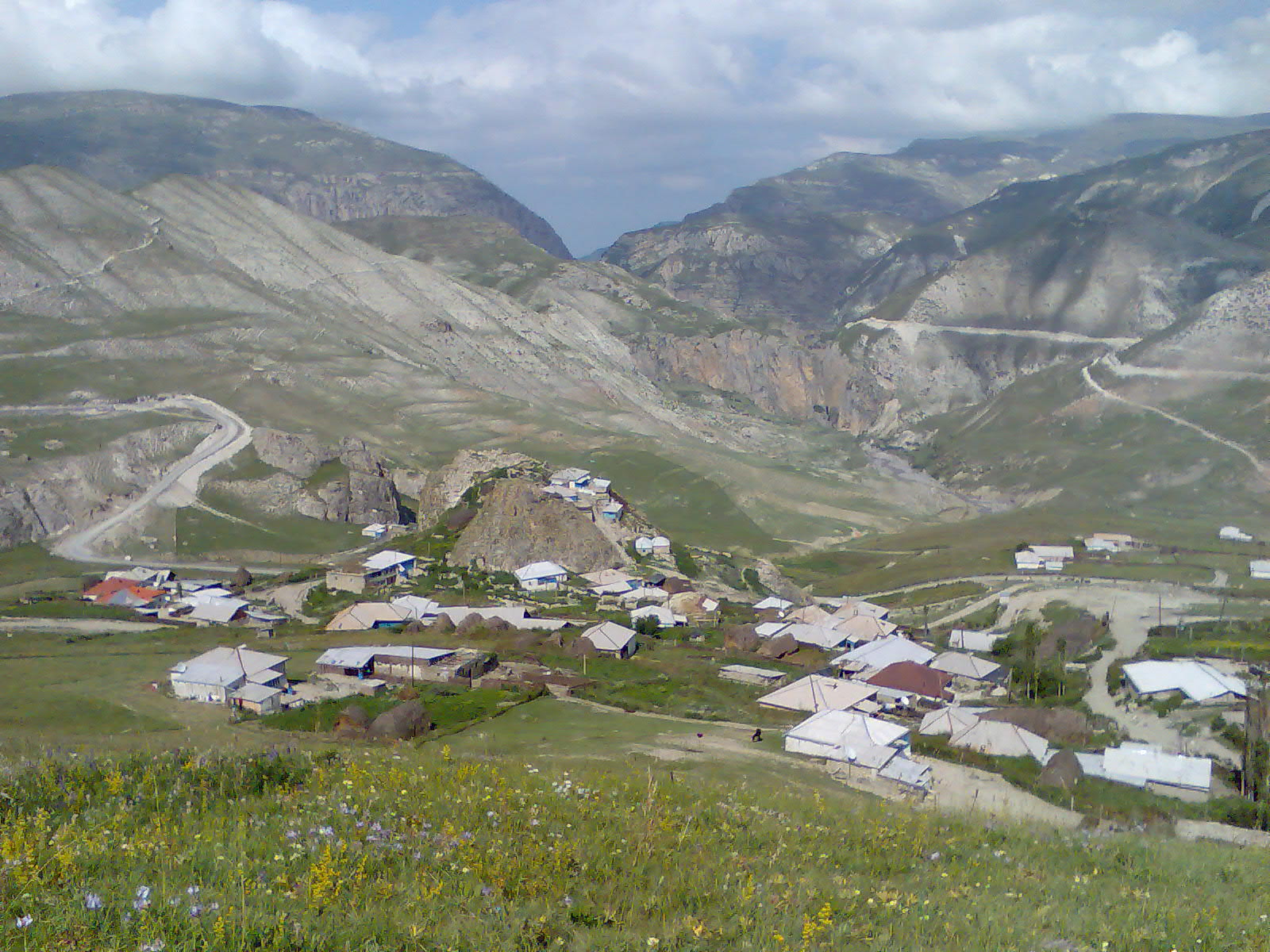

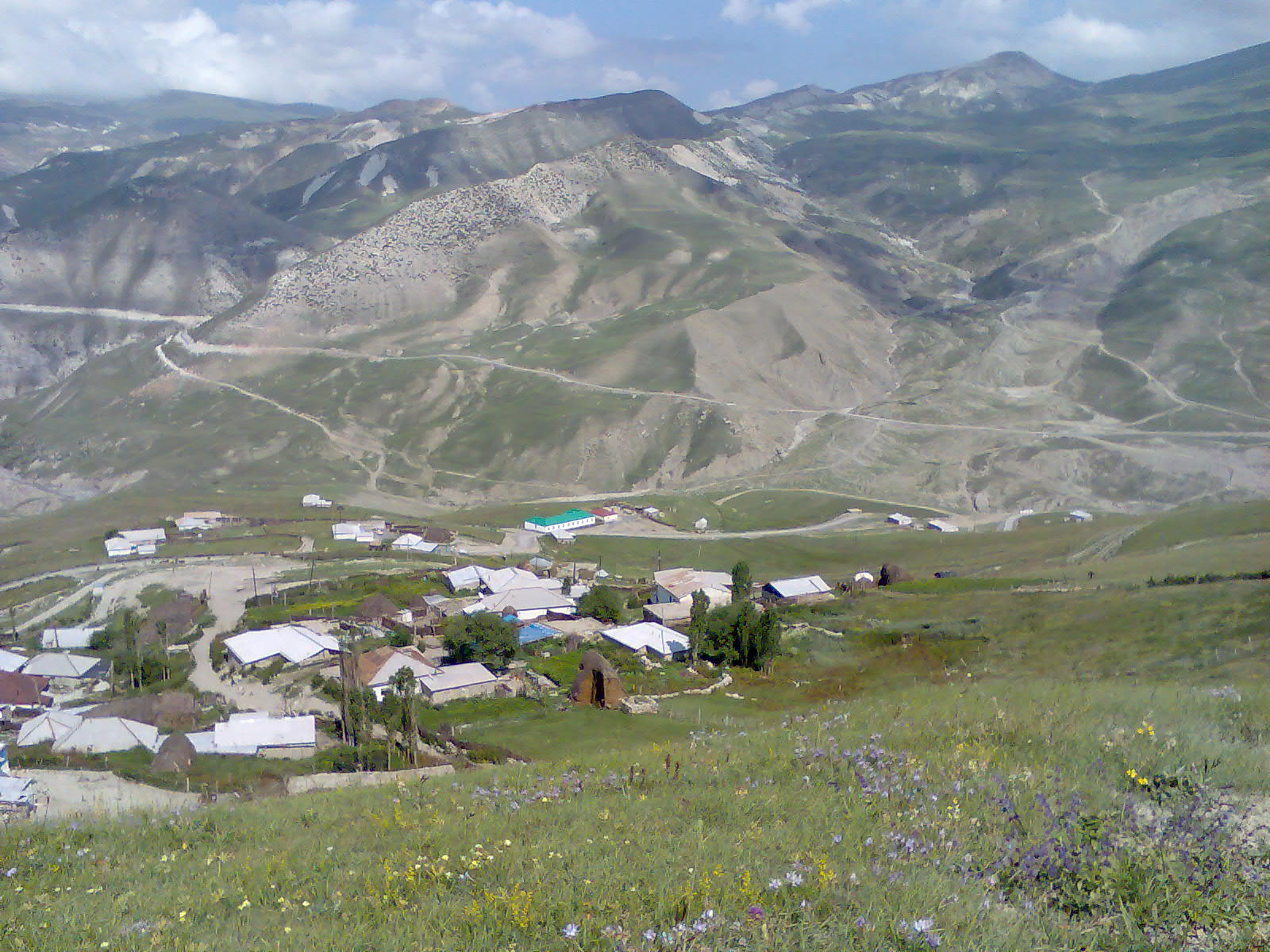

== See also ==
- Jek people
- Jek language

== Sources ==
- Jek (Quba) at GEOnet Names Server
- Cek, Azerbaijan
- Tərxan Paşazadə, "Dünyanın nadir etnik qrupu - Azərbaycan cekliləri", Azərbaycan qəzeti
