= Alik Cavaliere =

Italian sculptor (1926–1998)

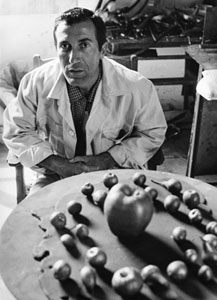
- Alik Cavaliere, 1962.
- Born: Aldo Cavaliere; 5 August 1926; Rome
- Died: 5 January 1998 (aged 71); Milan
- Known for: Sculpture

Alik Cavaliere (1926–1998) was an Italian sculptor. He spent his life researching the meaning of life, freedom, nature, and history. An atheist and libertarian, he didn't believe in any preconceived, final structure of society, the environment, or the universe. Nor did he follow any art movements of his time, although he knew all of them and was temporarily influenced by some. He made his own way, narrating his perceptions with witty irony, through sculptures made up of a wide range of materials, disposed in a chaotic labyrinth which visitors are forced to traverse without being able to find a definitive point of view.

== Biography ==
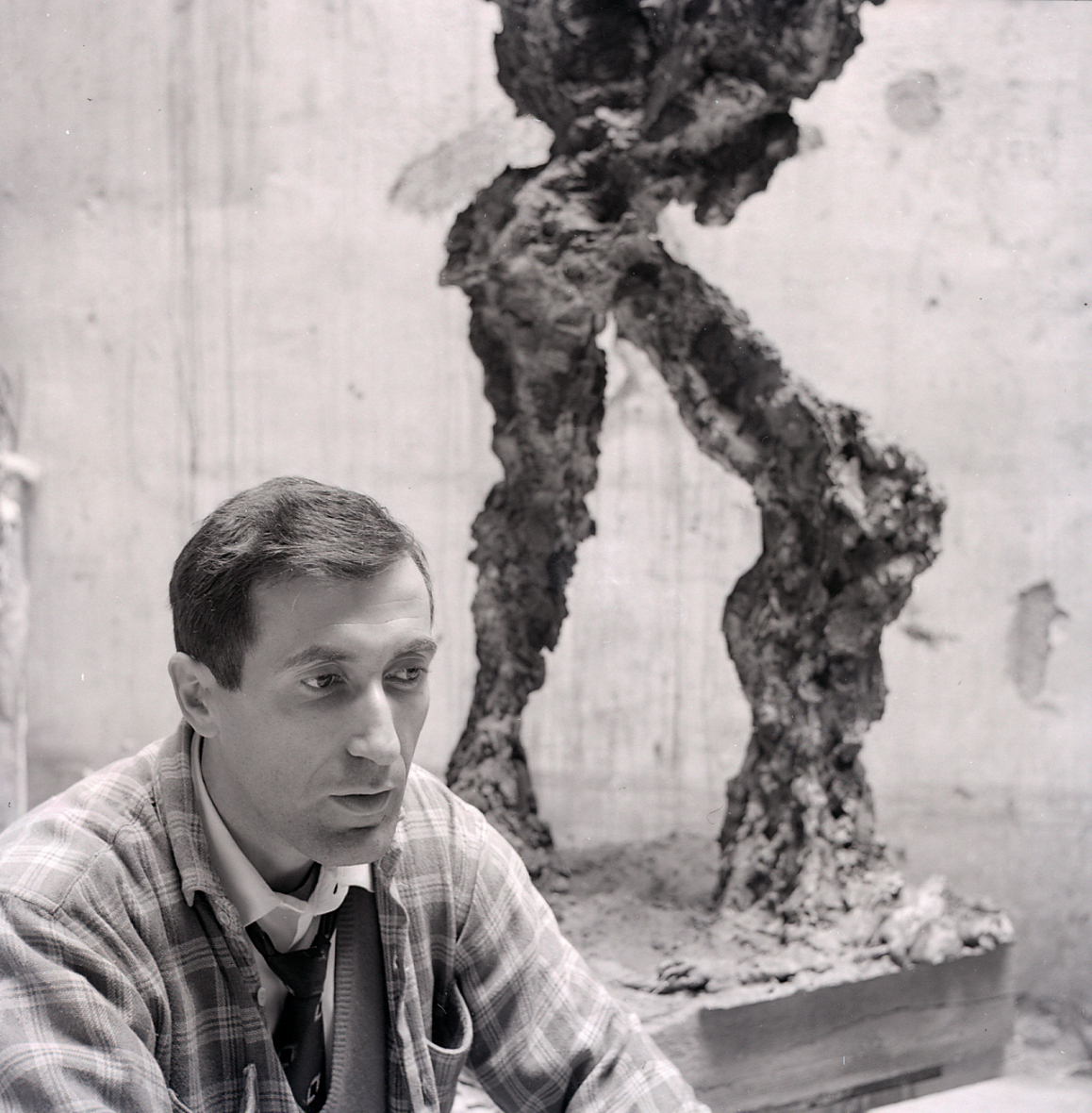
Alik Cavaliere photographed by Paolo Monti in 1965

Alik Cavaliere was born on 5 August 1926 in Rome, to Alberto Cavaliere, a southern Italian poet and politician, and Fanny Kaufman, a Russian Hebrew sculptor who escaped from the revolution.

After spending part of his childhood between Rome and Paris, he settled in Milan in 1938. In 1942, after high school, he enrolled in Brera Academy, where he was a pupil of Francesco Messina. There he met Giacomo Manzù, Achille Funi, Dario Fo, Bobo Piccoli, and Marino Marini, of whom he first became assistant and eventually succeeded as chair of Sculpture.

His first exhibit was in 1945, at a young artists show. His first personal exhibition was in 1951, at Galleria Colonna of Milan. He exhibited twice at Venice Biennale, in 1964 and 1972, both times in a personal room. He undertook teaching duty in Brera for over 30 years, eventually becoming director. A noteworthy retrospective of his works was held at the Royal Palace of Milan in 1992, named I luoghi circostanti (Surroundings).

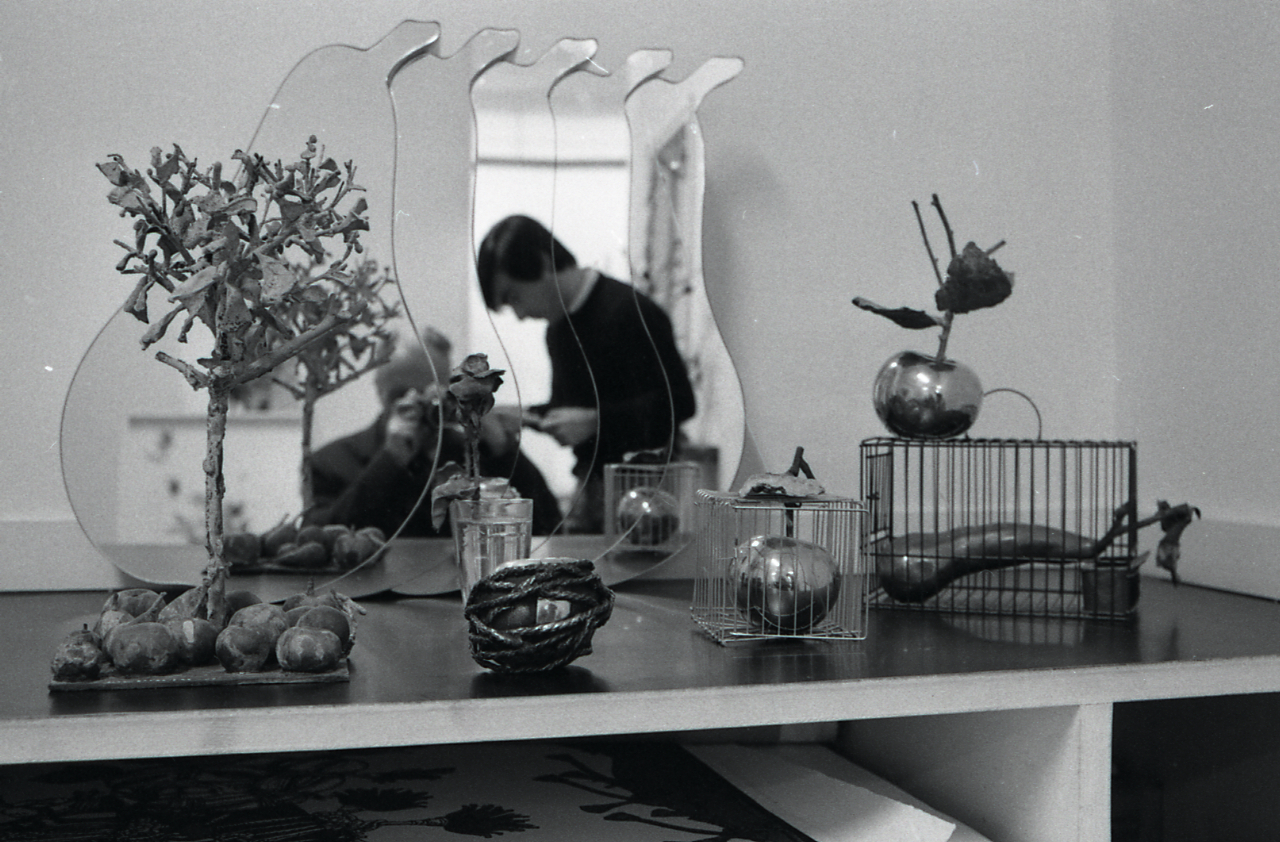
Works by Alik Cavaliere photographed in 1970 by Paolo Monti at De' Foscherari gallery, Bologna

From 27 June to 9 September 2018, Palazzo Reale hosted another Alik Cavaliere exhibition. Entitled the green universe, the anthology focused on the theme of nature, reconstructing the artist's journey through rendering aspects of luxuriance and suffering by representing plants.

He was buried at Cimitero Monumentale di Milano and his name is mentioned in the Famedio (hall of fame).

== Bibliography ==
- Mario De Micheli, Scultura italiana del dopoguerra, Schwarz Editore, Milan, 1958
- Emilio Tadini, Le avventure di Gustavo B., Galleria Levi, Milan, March 1963
- Guido Ballo, Alik Cavaliere, catalogo XXXII Biennale di Venezia, sala XLVII, June–September 1964
- Maria Luisa Gengaro, Le mostre veneziane del Centro Internazionale delle Arti e del Costume e della XXXII Biennale, Humanitas, Brescia, 1964
- Guido Ballo, La linea dell'arte italiana, Edizioni Mediterranee, Rome, 1964
- Pierre Restany, Alik Cavaliere and Naturalist Determmism, Martha Jackson Gallery, New York, 2–27 November 1965
- Umbro Apollonio, Gillo Dorfles, Dario Micacchi, Marcello Venturoli, Enrico Crispolti, Arte d'oggi, Curcio Editore, Rome, 1965
- Enrico Crispolti, Alik Cavaliere, Galleria Schwarz, Milan, 16 May - 12 June 1967
- Daniela Palazzoli, Alik Cavaliere, Haags Gemeentemuseum, June 1967
- Gillo Dorfles, Alik Cavaliere, Galleria La Minima, Turin, November–December 1967
- Giovanni Carandente, Dizionario della scultura, Il Saggiatore, Milan, 1967
- Udo Kultermann, Nuove dimensioni della scultura, Feltrinelli, Milan, 1967
- Daniela Palazzoli, Toward a Cold Poetic Image, Art International, Lugano, 1967
- Henry Martin, Natura morta, Still-Life, Art and Artists, New York, 1967
- Enrico Crispolti, Ricerche dopo l'informale, Officina Edizioni, Rome, 1968
- Vittorio Boarini, La serra e la gabbia, in Alik Cavaliere, W la libertà, Galleria de' Foscherari, Bologna, January–February 1970
- Jean Dypréau, Elements pour une confrontation et une rélation, in Alik Cavaliere, Galleria Schwarz, Milan, 6–31 May 1971
- Enrico Crispolti, Omaggio all'America Latina, mostra di Alik Cavaliere e Emilio Scanavino, Galleria De Foscherari, Bologna, June 1972
- Roberto Sanesi, I processi dalle storie inglesi di Shakespeare, Galleria Rizzardi, Milan, February–March 1974
- Vittorio Boarini, La serra e la gabbia, Alik Cavaliere, Una mostra riproposta e Calendario, Galleria Solferino, Milan, 12 November-12 December 1975
- Le Muse, Istituto Geografico de Agostini, Milan, 1975
- Il Milione n. 42, Istituto Geografico de Agostini, Milan, 1975
- Franco Russoli, Esperienze degli anni Sessanta, Aspetti della scultura del dopoguerra in Europa, L'Arte Moderna, Fratelli Fabbri, Milan, 1975
- Arturo Schwarz, L'immaginazione alchemica, La Salamandra, Milan, 1979
- Pier Luigi Tazzi, AI Nodal, Alik Cavaliere, Il Modo Italiano, Otis Art Institute of Parsons School of Design, Los Angeles, January–February 1984
- Rossana Bossaglia, Alik Cavaliere, Voyage, Pinacoteca e Musei Comunali, Macerata, September 1987
- Giorgio Di Genova, Storia dell'arte italiana del 900, Edizioni Bara, Ascona, 1991
- Giuseppe Maria Jonghi Lavarini and Gjlla GianiArt Fence, L'arte salva l'arte. 99 opere di artisti di Brera, Rotonda della Besana and Di Baio Editore, Milan, 1992
- Guido Ballo, Alik Cavaliere. I luoghi circostanti, catalogo della mostra retrospettiva a Palazzo Reale, Milan, 21 May - 5 July 1992
- Marco Meneguzzo, "Alik Cavaliere, A nous la libertè!" e "Fuochi di rivolta dal 1945 al 1968" in Due secoli di scultura, Fabbri Editore, Milan, June 1995
- Arturo Schwarz, La Galleria 1954-75, Mudima, Milano 1995
- Roberto Sanesi, Elogio della scultura, Panicale, 3 August-10 September 1996
- Loredana Parmesani, Contemporary Artists, 4th edition, St. James Press, Detroit 1996
- Rossana Bossaglia e Barbara Cattaneo, Alik Cavaliere, Le Storie: I Processi, Fondazione Stelline, Milan, February 1999, ASIN B00H376PFM
- Gillo Dorfles, Angela Vettese, Arti Visive, Il Novecento, Protagonisti e movimenti, Edizioni Atlas, Bergamo, 2000, ISBN 978-8826807591
- Arturo Schwarz, Alik Cavaliere: Poeta, filosofo, umanista e scultore, anche (quasi una biografia), Electa, Milan, 2008, ISBN 978-88-3706664-2
- Elena Pontiggia, Alik Cavaliere. Catalogo generale delle sculpture, Silvana Editoriale, Milan, 2011, ISBN 9788836618668
