= Igor Petković =

Serbian/Montenegrin footballer

Personal information
- Full name: Igor Petković
- Date of birth: 3 September 1983 (age 43)
- Place of birth: Rijeka Crnojevića, SFR Yugoslavia
- Height: 1.75 m (5 ft 9 in)
- Position: Right back

Senior career*
Years	Team	Apps	(Gls)
2000–2001	Mladost Apatin	13	(0)
2002–2008	Dynamo Kyiv	1	(0)
2002–2003	→ Dynamo-2 Kyiv	47	(0)
2002–2003	→ Dynamo-3 Kyiv	4	(0)
2003–2004	→ Vorskla Poltava (loan)	22	(1)
2004–2006	→ Dynamo-2 Kyiv	17	(2)
2007	→ Metalurgs Liepājas (loan)	10	(0)
2007	→ Čukarički (loan)	13	(0)
2008	→ Zorya Luhansk (loan)	4	(0)
2009	Srem	13	(1)
2010–2012	Mash'al Mubarek	59	(4)
2013	Olmaliq	23	(0)
2014	Neftchi Fergana	1	(0)
- * Club domestic league appearances and goals

Igor Petković (Serbian Cyrillic: Игор Петковић; born 3 September 1983) is a Serbian/Montenegrin footballer.

== Club career ==
Born in Rijeka Crnojevića, SR Montenegro, he played for Vorskla Poltava, Dynamo Kyiv and Zorya Luhansk in Ukrainian Premier League. From 2010 to 2012 he played for Mash'al Mubarek in Uzbek League. In February 2013 he moved to Olmaliq FK.
