= Ihor Tymchenko =

Ukrainian footballer

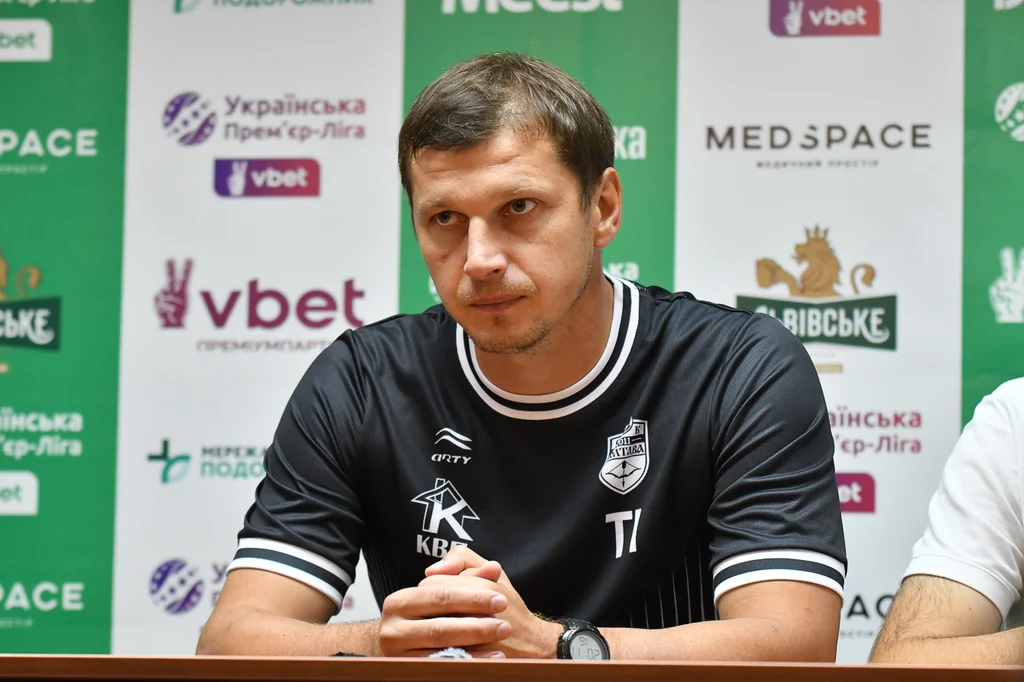
- In 2026 with Poltava

Personal information
- Full name: Ihor Viktorovych Tymchenko
- Date of birth: 16 January 1986 (age 40)
- Place of birth: Poltava, Ukrainian SSR
- Height: 1.89 m (6 ft 2 in)
- Position: Forward

Youth career
- Dnipro Youth

Senior career*
Years	Team	Apps	(Gls)
2004	Elektron Romny		
2004	Uholyok Dymytrov		
2004–2005	Lokomotiv Moscow (reserves)		
2005	Obolon-2 Kyiv		
2005–2006	Spartak Sumy		
2006–2007	Stal Alchevsk		
2007–2009	Metalurh Donetsk	16	(3)
2009	→ Zakarpattia Uzhhorod (loan)	5	(2)
2010–2011	→ Vorskla Poltava (loan)	6	(0)
2011	Chornomorets Odesa	6	(0)
2011–2012	Obolon Kyiv	13	(1)
2012–2013	Krymteplytsia Molodizhne	8	(3)
2013	FC Poltava	18	(2)
2014	Tytan Armyansk	2	(0)
2014	Hirnyk Kryvyi Rih	9	(1)
2015	Desna Chernihiv	6	(0)
2015–2018	Kremin Kremenchuk	74	(28)
2019	Olympia Savyntsi		
2020–2021	SC Poltava		

Managerial career
- 2021–: SC Poltava (assistant)
- * Club domestic league appearances and goals

Ihor Tymchenko (born 16 January 1986) is a former professional Ukrainian football striker and Ukrainian football coach.

== Career ==
Throughout his career, he played in such teams as Elektron Romny, Uholyok Dymytrov, Lokomotiv Moscow (reserves), Obolon Kyiv, Spartak Sumy, Stal Alchevsk, Metalurh Donetsk, Zakarpattia Uzhhorod, Vorskla Poltava, Chornomorets Odesa and Krymteplytsia Molodizhne.
