= Ildar Magdeev =

Uzbek footballer (born 1984)

Personal information
- Date of birth: 11 April 1984 (age 42)
- Place of birth: Bukhara, Uzbek SSR, Soviet Union
- Height: 1.80 m (5 ft 11 in)
- Position: Midfielder

Team information
- Current team: FK Dinamo Samarqand
- Number: 40

Youth career
- Buxoro

Senior career*
Years	Team	Apps	(Gls)
1999–2002	Buxoro	26	(1)
2002–	Pakhtakor Tashkent	58	(5)
2011–2012	→ Qingdao Jonoon (loan)	11	(0)
2012	Pakhtakor Tashkent	0	(0)
2012	Lokomotiv Tashkent	8	(0)
2013	FC Oqtepa		
2013	FK Dinamo Samarqand	3	(0)
2014	FC Oqtepa		

International career
2002–	Uzbekistan	23	(0)
- * Club domestic league appearances and goals as of 24 August 2013

Ildar Magdeev (born 11 April 1984) is an Uzbek professional footballer who plays as a midfielder for FK Dinamo Samarqand.

== Club career ==
Magdeev played for FK Buxoro and Pakhtakor Tashkent before joining Lokomotiv Tashkent in 2012. In March 2013 he moved to another capital club, Oqtepa Toshkent to play in Uzbekistan First League. Magdeev joined FK Dinamo Samarqand in August 2013.

== International career ==
Magdeev made 23 appearances for Uzbekistan and scored one goal. Magdeev was also called to play for the national team at the 2007 AFC Asian Cup.
