= Haput =

- Location within Azerbaijan
- Coordinates: 41°08′34″N 48°11′40″E
- Country: Azerbaijan
- Rayon: Quba
- Time zone: UTC+4 (AZT)
  - Summer (DST): UTC+5 (AZT)

Haput (also, Hapıt, Chagadzhik Gaput, Gapyt, Khapit, and Khaput) is a village in the Quba Rayon of Azerbaijan.
