= Alik Haýdarow =

Turkmenistan footballer

Personal information
- Date of birth: April 27, 1981 (age 45)
- Place of birth: Soviet Union
- Height: 1.82 m (6 ft 0 in)
- Position: Defender

Team information
- Current team: FC Ashgabat
- Number: 27

Senior career*
Years	Team	Apps	(Gls)
2002–2003	Kopetdag Asgabat		
2004	Nisa Asgabat		
2004–2007	FC Okzhetpes	80	(1)
2008	FC Zhetysu	4	(0)
2009–2010	FC Taraz	42	(0)
2011–2013	Mash'al Mubarek	39	(0)
2014	Altyn Asyr FK		
2015–	FC Ashgabat		

International career^{‡}
2001–present	Turkmenistan		
- * Club domestic league appearances and goals as of August 15, 2015 ‡ National team caps and goals as of July 15, 2007

Alik Haýdarow (born 27 April 1981) is a Turkmenistani footballer who plays as a defender for Altyn Asyr FK in the Ýokary Liga. He previously played for Ýokary liga club FC Ashgabat.

He is a member of the Turkmenistan national football team.

== Club career ==
Won the gold medal in the 2014 Ýokary Liga with Altyn Asyr FK. In 2015 moved to FC Ashgabat.

== Club career stats ==
Last update: 15 March 2008

Season	Team	Country	Division	Apps	Goals
2002	Köpetdag Aşgabat	Turkmenistan	1	??	??
2003	Köpetdag Aşgabat	Turkmenistan	1	??	??
2004	Nisa Aşgabat	Turkmenistan	1	??	??
2004	FC Okzhetpes	Kazakhstan	1	15	0
2005	FC Okzhetpes	Kazakhstan	1	25	0
2006	FC Okzhetpes	Kazakhstan	1	24	1
2007	FC Okzhetpes	Kazakhstan	1	16	0
2008	FC Zhetysu	Kazakhstan	1	4	0
2009	FC Taraz	Kazakhstan	1		
