= 2024 Uzbekistan Pro League =

Uzbekistan Pro League
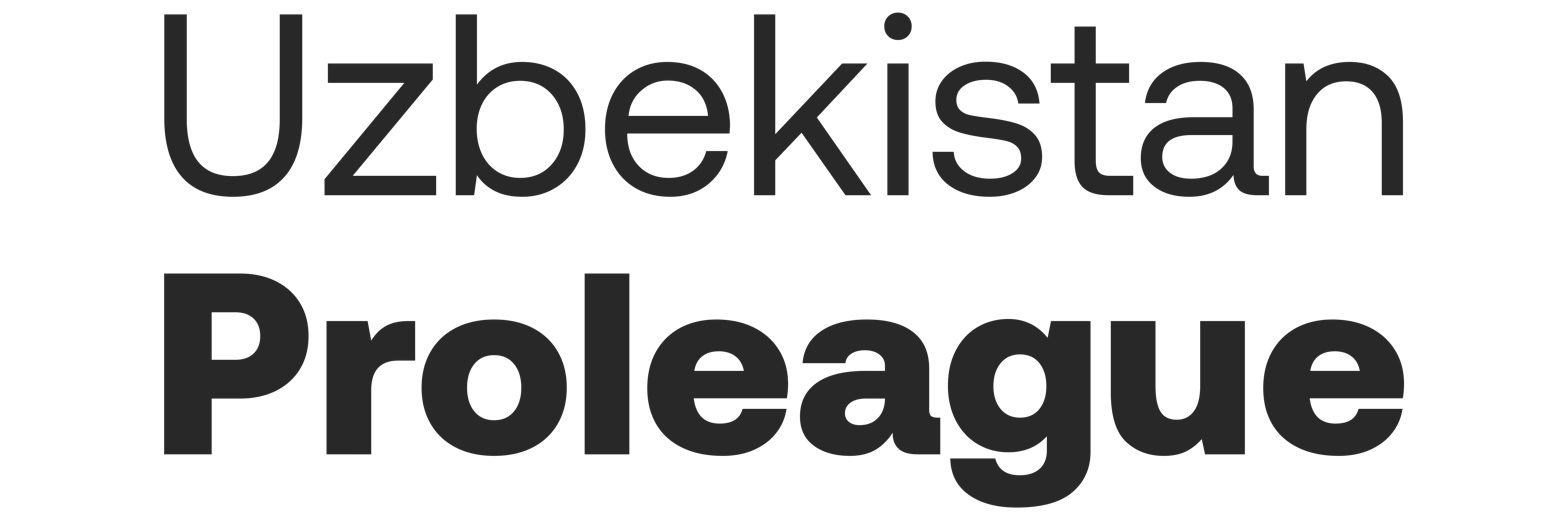
- Logo of Pro League
- Season: 2024
- Dates: 12 March – 28 November 2024
- Champions: Mash'al Mubarek
- Promoted: Mash'al Mubarek; Bukhara; Kokand 1912; Shurtan Guzar; Khorazm
- Relegated: Dustlik
- Matches: 55
- Goals: 119 (2.16 per match)
- Top goalscorer: Khumoyun Murtozoyev (7 goal)
- Biggest home win: Aral Nukus 6–0 Olimpik-Mobiuz (4 April 2024-yil)
- Biggest away win: Kokand 1912 0–3 Shurtan Guzar (25 June 2024-yil)
- Highest scoring: Aral Nukus 6–0 Olimpik-Mobiuz (4 April 2024-yil)
- Longest winning run: 4 games Kokand 1912
- Longest unbeaten run: 11 games Bukhara
- Longest winless run: 8 games Dustlik Tashkent
- Longest losing run: 8 games Dustlik Tashkent
- Highest attendance: 2,470 - Xorazm Urganch vs Kokand 1912 (4 June 2024-yil)
- Lowest attendance: 55 - Olimpik-Mobiuz vs Kokand 1912 (8 April 2024-yil)
- Average attendance: 756 (23 March 2024)
- All statistics correct as of December 1, 2024.

In 2024 the Uzbekistan Pro League played its 33rd season since its establishment in 1992. The competition started on 12 March 2024 and ended on 28 November 2024.

== Review ==
=== Changes ===
On December 12, 2023, announced that the number of teams in the Uzbekistan Super League would increase to 16 starting from the 2025 season.[4] This confirmed that two teams from the Uzbekistan Professional League would receive direct promotion to the Uzbekistan Super League for the 2024 season. The teams finishing 3rd and 4th in the tournament would participate in the Super League playoffs against the teams finishing 13th and 12th in the 2024 Uzbekistan Super League.

== Teams ==
Eight teams have been confirmed to participate in the 2024 Uzbek Pro League. The league, which has three teams remaining compared to the previous season, will consist of 28 rounds, each consisting of four rounds.

=== Teams qualified for Super League ===
Last season, Lokomotiv and Dinamo, who played in Pro League, took first place in the standings and qualified for the 2024 Uzbekistan Super League season.

=== New teams in Pro League ===
Bukhara, which finished 13th in the 2023 Uzbekistan Super League, began the new season in Pro League. Dustlik Tashkent, which meets the licensing requirements for Uzbekistan First League, received conditional permission to participate. The last team to join the league, Olympic's farm club, Olympic Farm, was allowed to participate in the next Pro League season with a guarantee from Uzbekistan Football Association and sponsorship from the communications company MobiUz.

=== Teams that left Pro League ===
Andijan SGS, the 11th-place team in the 2023 Uzbekistan Pro League, was relegated to the lower league, the Uzbekistan First League, due to its last-place finish. Yangiyer, the 2023 Uzbekistan First League winner, confirmed its participation in the First League due to licensing non-compliance. Gijduvan was excluded from the league's list of participants due to failure to timely comply with licensing requirements. Samarkand Unired announced the termination of its activities due to financial problems.

Turon Yaypan, which was relegated from Super League to the Pro League, announced that it would not be able to participate in the Pro League due to financial problems and that the season would begin in the Uzbekistan First League in 2024. The team's parent club, Navbahor, was relegated from the Pro League to the First League due to debts and financial problems with the farm club.

== Teams ==
Club	Coach	Captain	Location	Stadium	Kit sponsor	Shirt sponsor
Aral	(Uzbekistan) Nematullo Quttiboev		Nukus	Turon Stadium	(Spain) Kelme	Uz-Kor Gaz Chemical
Bukhara	(Uzbekistan) Ulugbek Bakayev		Bukhara	Dustlik Tashkent	(Germany) Jako	BNQIZ
Dustlik Tashkent	(Uzbekistan) Aleksey Evstafeev		Tashkent	Turon Stadium	(United States) Nike	
Mash'al Mubarek	(Uzbekistan) Asror Aliqulov		Muborak	Bahrom Vafoev Stadium	(Italy) Macron	NBU
Olimpik-Mobiuz	(Uzbekistan) Farkhod Nishonov		Tashkent	Dustlik Stadium	(United States) Nike	MobiUZ
Kokand 1912	(Uzbekistan) Bakhrom Khaydarov		Kokand	Istiqlol Stadium	(Uzbekistan) 7SABER	
Shurtan Guzar	(Uzbekistan) Anvar Berdiev		Gʻuzor	G'uzor Stadium	(Spain) Kelme	
Xorazm Urganch	(Tajikistan) Khakim Fuzaylov		Xorazm	Xorazm Stadium	(Spain) Kelme	Uztelecom

== Foreign players ==
The number of foreign players is restricted to five per UPL team. A team can use only five foreign players on the field in each game.

Club	Player 1	Player 2	Player 3	Player 4	Player 5	AFC players	Former players
Aral Nukus							
Bukhara	(Belarus) Yaroslav Makushinsky	(Bosnia and Herzegovina) Dominik Begić	(Croatia) Frane Ikić	(Serbia) Marko Kolaković	(Serbia) Milan Mirosavljev	(Iran) Amirhossein Reyvandi	
Dustlik Tashkent							
Mash'al Mubarek	(Nigeria) **Michael Babatunde**	(Ghana) Abdullatif Abdallah Maga					(Nigeria) Samuel Chigozie
Olimpik-Mobiuz							
Kokand 1912	(Georgia (country)) Andro Giorgadze	(Georgia (country)) Shota Gvazava	(Ukraine) Serhiy Petrov	(Ukraine) Yegor Kondratyuk			
Shurtan Guzar							
Xorazm Urganch							(Mali) Issa Diamoutene

In bold: Players that have been capped for their national team.

== League table ==
Pos	Team	Pld	W	D	L	GF	GA	GD	Pts	Qualification or relegation
1	Mash'al Mubarek (C, P)	28	16	8	4	41	15	+26	56	Promotion to Uzbekistan Super League
2	Bukhara (P)	28	15	7	6	40	18	+22	52	Promotion to Uzbekistan Super League
3	Kokand 1912 (O, P)	28	12	10	6	30	21	+9	46	Qualification for Super League play-off
4	Shurtan Guzar (O, P)	28	11	8	9	34	30	+4	41	Qualification for Super League play-off
5	Aral Nukus	28	10	8	10	33	34	−1	38	
6	Xorazm Urganch (P)	28	6	11	11	18	30	−12	29	Promotion to Uzbekistan Super League
7	Olimpik-Mobiuz	28	5	9	14	25	49	−24	24	
8	Dustlik Tashkent (R)	28	4	5	19	23	47	−24	17	Relegation to Uzbekistan First League

Source: Uzbekistan Professional Football League
Rules for classification: 1) points; 2) head-to-head points; 3) head-to-head goal difference; 4) head-to-head away goals scored; 5) goal difference; 6) number of goals scored.
(C) Champions; (O) Play-off winners; (P) Promoted; (R) Relegated

=== 1 ===
12 March 2024 1	**Aral**	**1–0**	**Doʻstlik**	Nukus
16:00 UZT (UTC+5)	Sagdullayev 18'	Report (in Uzbek)		Attendance: 890

12 March 2024 2	**Mashʼal**	**0–0**	**Kokand 1912**	Bahrom Vafoyev
16:00 UZT (UTC+5)		Report (in Uzbek)		Attendance: 382

13 March 2024 3	**Shoʻrtan**	**0–0**	**Buxoro**	Gʻuzor
16:30 UZT (UTC+5)		Report (in Uzbek)		Attendance: 1006

15 March 2024 4	**Olimpik**	**0–1**	**Xorazm**	Doʻstlik
16:00 UZT (UTC+5)		Report (in Uzbek)	Meliyev 12'	Attendance: 155

=== 2 ===
19 March 2024 1	**Kokand 1912**	**0–1**	**Buxoro**	Istiqlol
17:40 UZT (UTC+5)		Report (in Uzbek)	Musayev 11'	Attendance: 394

19 March 2024 2	**Mashʼal**	**1–0**	**Aral**	Bahrom Vafoyev
19:00 UZT (UTC+5)	Murtozayev 22'	Report (in Uzbek)		Attendance: 310

20 March 2024 3	**Xorazm**	**2–1**	**Shoʻrtan**	Xorazm
15:40 UZT (UTC+5)	Xudoyberdiyev 14'; Nuriddinov 46'	Report (in Uzbek)	Ismailov 72'	Attendance: 1854

20 March 2024 4	**Doʻstlik**	**1–2**	**Olimpik Mobiuz**	Lokomotiv
19:00 UZT (UTC+5)	Asatillayev 84'	Report (in Uzbek)	Tuxsanov 28'; Qurbonov 66'	Attendance: 216

=== 3 ===
26 March 2024 1	**Aral**	**1–3**	**Kokand 1912**	Nukus
19:00 UZT (UTC+5)	Aliyev 71'	Report (in Uzbek)	Abdurahimov 34'; Noʻmonov 78'; Ismoilov 90+1'	Attendance: 760

27 March 2024 2	**Shoʻrtan**	**2–0**	**Doʻstlik**	Gʻuzor
19:00 UZT (UTC+5)	Mukarov 20'; Nuriddinov 76'	Report (in Uzbek)		Attendance: 820

28 March 2024 3	**Buxoro**	**0–0**	**Xorazm**	Bunyodkor
19:00 UZT (UTC+5)		Report (in Uzbek)		Attendance: 170

29 March 2024 4	**Olimpik Mobiuz**	**0–0**	**Mashʼal**	Doʻstlik
19:00 UZT (UTC+5)		Report (in Uzbek)		Attendance: 208

=== 4 ===
1 April 2024 1	**Doʻstlik**	**0–2**	**Buxoro**	Lokomotiv
19:00 UZT (UTC+5)		Report (in Uzbek)	Qayumov 9'; Begić 58'

2 April 2024 2	**Kokand 1912**	**3–0**	**Xorazm**	Fargʻona
19:00 UZT (UTC+5)	Noʻmonov 12'; Akramov 60'; Muhammadjonov 65'	Report (in Uzbek)		Stadium: Istiqlol

3 April 2024 3	**Aral**	**6–0**	**Olimpik Mobiuz**	Nukus
19:00 UZT (UTC+5)	Qutiboyev 1'; Umirbekov 6'; Joʻraboyev 22'; Qalmagambetov 49'; Qutiboyev 62'; Komilov 75'	Report (in Uzbek)

3 April 2024 4	**Mashʼal**	**2–0**	**Shoʻrtan**	Bahrom Vafoyev
19:00 UZT (UTC+5)	Murtazoyev 16'; Babatunde 86'	Report (in Uzbek)

=== 5 ===
8 April 2024 1	**Olimpik Mobiuz**	**1–3**	**Kokand 1912**	Doʻstlik
16:00 UZT (UTC+5)	Fomin 40'	Report (in Uzbek)	Petrov 27', 74', 84'	Attendance: 55

8 April 2024 2	**Shoʻrtan**	**1–1**	**Aral**	Gʻuzor
17:00 UZT (UTC+5)	Zoirov 65'	Report (in Uzbek)	Qalmagambetov 7'	Attendance: 612

8 April 2024 3	**Xorazm**	**1–0**	**Doʻstlik**	Xorazm
17:00 UZT (UTC+5)	Meliyev 77'	Report (in Uzbek)		Attendance: 1125

8 April 2024 4	**Buxoro**	**0–0**	**Mashʼal**	Bunyodkor
17:00 UZT (UTC+5)		Report (in Uzbek)		Attendance: 130

=== 6 ===
3 May 2024 1	**Olimpik Mobiuz**	**2–2**	**Shoʻrtan**	Doʻstlik
16:00 UZT (UTC+5)	Olimov 15'; Jumayev 36'	Report (in Uzbek)	Ergashev 90+3'; Zohidov 90+6'	Attendance: 73

3 May 2024 2	**Aral**	**0–0**	**Buxoro**	Nukus
16:00 UZT (UTC+5)		Report (in Uzbek)		Attendance: 477

3 May 2024 3	**Kokand 1912**	**2–0**	**Doʻstlik**	Istiqlol
16:00 UZT (UTC+5)	Sharipov 41'; Mirahmatov 90+1'	Report (in Uzbek)		Attendance: 213

3 May 2024 4	**Mashʼal**	**4–0**	**Xorazm**	Bahrom Vafoyev
16:00 UZT (UTC+5)	Gʻanixonov 7'; Murodov 9'; Abduhamidov 70'; Murtazoyev 90+2'	Report (in Uzbek)		Attendance: 452

=== 7 ===
10 May 2024 1	**Xorazm**	**0–1**	**Aral**	Xorazm
18:00 UZT (UTC+5)		Report (in Uzbek)	Qutiboyev 90+5'	Attendance: 452

10 May 2024 2	**Buxoro**	**4–1**	**Olimpik Mobiuz**	Bunyodkor
19:00 UZT (UTC+5)	Ikić 29', 45+3', 45+4'; Begić 45+1'	Report (in Uzbek)	Kolaković 82'	Attendance: 452

9 June 2024 3	**Shoʻrtan**	**1–0**	**Kokand 1912**	Gʻuzor
17:00 UZT (UTC+5)	Zoirov 7'	Report (in Uzbek)		Attendance: 452

9 June 2024 4	**Doʻstlik**	**2–4**	**Mashʼal**	Lokomotiv
18:00 UZT (UTC+5)	Ubaydullayev 45+1', 47'	Report (in Uzbek)	Azimov 15'; Murodov 35', 40'; Murtazoyev 71'	Attendance: 452

=== 8 ===
16 May 2024 1	**Buxoro**	**3–0**	**Shoʻrtan**	Bunyodkor
18:00 UZT (UTC+5)	Begić 40'; Poʻlatov 60'; Xudoyberdiyev 82'	Report (in Uzbek)		Attendance: 452

16 May 2024 2	**Kokand 1912**	**3–2**	**Mashʼal**	Istiqlol
18:00 UZT (UTC+5)	Akbarov 7'; Giorgadze 30'; Ismoilov 63'	Report (in Uzbek)	Giorgadze 50'; Murtozoyev 86'	Attendance: 452

17 May 2024 3	**Doʻstlik**	**1–0**	**Aral**	Bunyodkor
17:00 UZT (UTC+5)	Abduhamidov 24'	Report (in Uzbek)	Qutiboyev 42'; Turopov 74'; Sheripov 87'	Attendance: 452

17 May 2024 4	**Xorazm**	**2–4**	**Olimpik Mobiuz**	Xorazm
18:00 UZT (UTC+5)		Report (in Uzbek)	Tuxsanov 7'; Tojiboyev 52'	Attendance: 452

=== 9 ===
22 May 2024 1	**Shoʻrtan**	**1–0**	**Xorazm**	Gʻuzor
18:00 UZT (UTC+5)	Xoltoʻrayev 7'	Report (in Uzbek)		Attendance: 778

23 May 2024 2	**Olimpik Mobiuz**	**1–2**	**Doʻstlik**	Jar
17:00 UZT (UTC+5)	Tuxsanov 57'	Report (in Uzbek)	Qodirov 47'; Abduhamidov 78'	Attendance: 85

23 May 2024 3	**Aral**	**1–1**	**Mashʼal**	Nukus
17:00 UZT (UTC+5)	Sag‘dullayev 20'	Report (in Uzbek)	Murodov 87'	Attendance: 658

24 May 2024 4	**Buxoro**	**0–0**	**Kokand 1912**	Bunyodkor
18:00 UZT (UTC+5)		Report (in Uzbek)		Attendance: 388

=== 10 ===
22 May 2024 1	**Doʻstlik**	**1–2**	**Shoʻrtan**	Bunyodkor
17:00 UZT (UTC+5)	Qodirov 8'	Report (in Uzbek)	Xoltoʻrayev 17'; Hasanov 58'	Attendance: 78

23 May 2024 2	**Kokand 1912**	**1–2**	**Aral**	Bunyodkor
18:00 UZT (UTC+5)	Sobirov 90+7'	Report (in Uzbek)	Rasulov 14'; Qalmagambetov 75'	Attendance: 286

23 May 2024 3	**Mashʼal**	**3–0**	**Olimpik Mobiuz**	Bahrom Vafoyev
19:00 UZT (UTC+5)	Babatunde 53'; Murtazoyev 55', 69'	Report (in Uzbek)		Attendance: 913

24 May 2024 4	**Xorazm**	**0–1**	**Buxoro**	Xorazm
18:00 UZT (UTC+5)		Report (in Uzbek)	Ergashboyev 82'	Attendance: 1245

=== 11 ===
31 May 2024 1	**Olimpik Mobiuz**	**1–1**	**Aral**	Jar
18:00 UZT (UTC+5)	Qutiboyev 30'	Report (in Uzbek)	Adhamov 45+2'	Attendance: 247

3 June 2024 2	**Shoʻrtan**	**2–1**	**Mashʼal**	Gʻuzor
18:00 UZT (UTC+5)	Gʻanixonov 45+1'; Xudoyberdiyev 90'	Report (in Uzbek)	Nuriddinov 90+6'	Attendance: 620

3 June 2024 3	**Buxoro**	**2–2**	**Doʻstlik**	Bunyodkor
18:00 UZT (UTC+5)	Ergashboyev 68'; Kolaković 87'	Report (in Uzbek)	Qodirov 26', 51'	Attendance: 266

4 June 2024 4	**Xorazm**	**0–0**	**Kokand 1912**	Xorazm
18:30 UZT (UTC+5)		Report (in Uzbek)		Attendance: 2470

=== 12 ===
12 June 2024 1	**Doʻstlik**	**1–3**	**Xorazm**	Lokomotiv
17:00 UZT (UTC+5)	Qodirov 48'	Report (in Uzbek)	Ismoilov 50'; Gʻulomjonov 53'; Komilov 90+1'	Attendance: 113

13 June 2024 2	**Aral**	**2–0**	**Shoʻrtan**	Nukus
18:00 UZT (UTC+5)	Rasulov 39'; Kuanishbayev 41'	Report (in Uzbek)		Attendance: 522

13 June 2024 3	**Mashʼal**	**1–0**	**Buxoro**	Bahrom Vafoyev
19:00 UZT (UTC+5)	Gʻanixonov 2'	Report (in Uzbek)		Attendance: 1983

29 June 2024 4	**Kokand 1912**	**0–1**	**Olimpik MobiUz**	Istiqlol
20:00 UZT (UTC+5)		Report (in Uzbek)	Joʻrayev 66'	Attendance: 288

=== 13 ===
18 June 2024 1	**Doʻstlik**	**1–1**	**Kokand 1912**	Lokomotiv
18:00 UZT (UTC+5)	Qodirov 48'	Report (in Uzbek)	Petrov 46'	Attendance: 116

18 June 2024 2	**Shoʻrtan**	**3–0**	**Olimpik MobiUz**	Gʻuzor
18:00 UZT (UTC+5)	Mukarov 15', 43'; Zoirov 57'	Report (in Uzbek)		Attendance: 587

19 June 2024 3	**Xorazm**	**0–0**	**Mashʼal**	Xorazm
18:00 UZT (UTC+5)		Report (in Uzbek)		Attendance: 1819

19 June 2024 4	**Buxoro**	**3–0**	**Aral**	Bunyodkor
18:30 UZT (UTC+5)	Ikić 58'; Begić 70'; Kolaković 79'	Report (in Uzbek)		Attendance: 228

=== 14 ===
23 June 2024 1	**Olimpik Mobiuz**	**0–1**	**Buxoro**	Jar
18:00 UZT (UTC+5)		Report (in Uzbek)	Begić 42'	Attendance: 247

25 June 2024 2	**Kokand 1912**	**0–3**	**Shoʻrtan**	Istiqlol
18:00 UZT (UTC+5)		Report (in Uzbek)	Zoirov 45'; Zoirov 47'; Nuriddinov 82'	Attendance: 620

26 June 2024 3	**Aral**	**0–0**	**Xorazm**	Nukus
18:00 UZT (UTC+5)		Report (in Uzbek)		Attendance: 266

26 June 2024 4	**Mashʼal**	**2–0**	**Doʻstlik**	Bahrom Vafoyev
18:30 UZT (UTC+5)	Azimov 28'; Niyazmetov 79'	Report (in Uzbek)		Attendance: 2470

=== 15 ===
3 August 2024 1	**Olimpik Mobiuz**	**1–1**	**Xorazm**	Jar
18:00 UZT (UTC+5)	Fomin 23'	Report (in Uzbek)	Bobojonov 45+1'	Attendance: 127

8 August 2024 2	**Shoʻrtan**	**1–2**	**Buxoro**	Gʻuzor
18:00 UZT (UTC+5)	Nuriddinov 57'	Report (in Uzbek)	Begić 10'; Xayrullayev 82'	Attendance: 587

8 August 2024 3	**Aral**	**2–1**	**Doʻstlik**	Nukus
18:00 UZT (UTC+5)	Joʻraboyev 38'; Umirbekov 45'	Report (in Uzbek)	Usmonov 59'	Attendance: 867

9 August 2024 4	**Mashʼal**	**0–1**	**Kokand 1912**	Bahrom Vafoyev
18:30 UZT (UTC+5)		Report (in Uzbek)	Kondratyuk 68'	Attendance: 532

=== 16 ===
14 August 2024 1	**Doʻstlik**	**2–1**	**Olimpik MobiUz**	Paxtakor
18:00 UZT (UTC+5)	Asatillayev 3'; Umirov 49'	Report (in Uzbek)	Ibraimov 41'	Attendance: 130

14 August 2024 2	**Xorazm**	**0–0**	**Shoʻrtan**	Xorazm
18:00 UZT (UTC+5)		Report (in Uzbek)		Attendance: 1127

15 August 2024 3	**Kokand 1912**	**0–1**	**Buxoro**	Istiqlol
18:00 UZT (UTC+5)		Report (in Uzbek)	Kolaković 33'	Attendance: 787

15 August 2024 4	**Mashʼal**	**3–0**	**Aral**	Bahrom Vafoyev
18:30 UZT (UTC+5)	Abdualimov 58'; Murtozoyev 76'; Babatunde 85'	Report (in Uzbek)		Attendance: 277

=== 17 ===
20 August 2024 1	**Buxoro**	**3–1**	**Xorazm**	Doʻstlik
17:00 UZT (UTC+5)	Otajonov 50'; Begić 86'; Kolaković 90+5'	Report (in Uzbek)	Tursunqulov 23'	Attendance: 45

21 August 2024 2	**Aral**	**0–0**	**Kokand 1912**	Nukus
18:30 UZT (UTC+5)		Report (in Uzbek)		Attendance: 1255

21 August 2024 3	**Shoʻrtan**	**3–1**	**Doʻstlik**	Gʻuzor
18:30 UZT (UTC+5)	Tursunqulov 23'; Otajonov 50'; Begić 86'	Report (in Uzbek)	Kolaković 90+5'	Attendance: 635

22 August 2024 4	**Olimpik Mobiuz**	**0–1**	**Mashʼal**	Doʻstlik
17:00 UZT (UTC+5)		Report (in Uzbek)	Murtozoyev 50'	Attendance: 57

=== 18 ===
27 August 2024 1	**Doʻstlik**	**1–2**	**Buxoro**	Paxtakor
17:00 UZT (UTC+5)	Qodirov 43'	Report (in Uzbek)	Begić 65'; Berdiyev 89'	Attendance: 71

27 August 2024 2	**Kokand 1912**	**1–0**	**Xorazm**	Istiqlol
18:30 UZT (UTC+5)	Kondratyuk 35'	Report (in Uzbek)		Attendance: 1255

28 August 2024 3	**Aral**	**3–1**	**Olimpik MobiUz**	Nukus
18:30 UZT (UTC+5)	Abdulhaqov 14'	Report (in Uzbek)	Tojiboyev 86'	Attendance: 156

28 August 2024 4	**Mashʼal**	**3–1**	**Shoʻrtan**	Bahrom Vafoyev
17:00 UZT (UTC+5)	Murtozoyev 11'; Baratov 44'; Murtozoyev 53'	Report (in Uzbek)	Zoirov 45+4'	Attendance: 760

=== 19 ===
9 September 2024 1	**Olimpik**	**2–2**	**Kokand 1912**	Doʻstlik
16:00 UZT (UTC+5)	Komilov 10'; Gvazava 70'	Report (in Uzbek)	Beshimov 37'; Fayzullayev 46'	Attendance: 71; Referee: Nikita Mustafin

11 September 2024 2	**Shoʻrtan**	**4–0**	**Aral**	Gʻuzor
17:00 UZT (UTC+5)	Hasanov 50'; Zoirov 70'; Qodirov 85'; Zoirov 89'	Report (in Uzbek)		Attendance: 606

11 September 2024 3	**Xorazm**	**0–2**	**Doʻstlik**	Xorazm
17:00 UZT (UTC+5)		Report (in Uzbek)	Rahmonov 29'; Abduhamidov 90+2'	Attendance: 852

12 September 2024 4	**Buxoro**	**0–1**	**Mashʼal**	Doʻstlik
17:00 UZT (UTC+5)		Report (in Uzbek)	Ochilov 7'	Attendance: 760

=== 20 ===
18 September 2024 1	**Aral**	**1–0**	**Buxoro**	NOPSTTM
16:00 UZT (UTC+5)	Yusupbaev 81'	Report (in Uzbek)		Attendance: 998

18 September 2024 2	**Mashʼal**	**2–1**	**Xorazm**	Bahrom Vafoyev
18:00 UZT (UTC+5)	Murtozoyev 32', 38'	Report (in Uzbek)	Yoʻldoshev 62'	Attendance: 1059

6 October 2024 3	**Olimpik**	**1–1**	**Shoʻrtan**	Doʻstlik
15:45 UZT (UTC+5)	Tojiboyev 52'	Report (in Uzbek)	Xudoyberdiyev 54'	Attendance: 852

12 October 2024 4	**Kokand 1912**	**1–0**	**Doʻstlik**	Oʻzbekiston
16:30 UZT (UTC+5)	Beshimov 45+4'	Report (in Uzbek)		Attendance: 760

=== 21 ===
24 September 2024 1	**Doʻstlik**	**1–2**	**Mashʼal**	Paxtakor
16:00 UZT (UTC+5)	Jumayev 84'	Report (in Uzbek)	Baratov 79'; Murtozoyev 90+6'	Attendance: 226

24 September 2024 2	**Buxoro**	**2–1**	**Olimpik MobiUz**	Doʻstlik
18:00 UZT (UTC+5)	Begić 7', 12', 32'; Ergashev 82'; Kolaković 83'	Report (in Uzbek)		Attendance: 1059

24 September 2024 3	**Xorazm**	**1–1**	**Aral**	Xorazm
15:45 UZT (UTC+5)	Bobojonov 46'; Farhodov 55'; Tursunqulov 72'	Report (in Uzbek)	Sagdullayev 75'	Attendance: 2192

24 September 2024 4	**Shoʻrtan**	**1–1**	**Kokand 1912**	Gʻuzor
16:30 UZT (UTC+5)	Nuriddinov 55'	Report (in Uzbek)	Beshimov 12'	Attendance: 1121

=== 22 ===
3 October 2024 1	**Xorazm**	**1–1**	**Olimpik MobiUz**	Xorazm
16:00 UZT (UTC+5)	Qosimov 44'	Report (in Uzbek)	Tuxsanov 12'	Attendance: 571

3 October 2024 2	**Doʻstlik**	**2–1**	**Aral**	Paxtakor
18:00 UZT (UTC+5)	Abduhamidov 63'; Qobilov 90+1'	Report (in Uzbek)	Rasulov 71'	Attendance: 1059

3 October 2024 3	**Buxoro**	**3–0**	**Shoʻrtan**	Doʻstlik
15:45 UZT (UTC+5)	Begić 34'; Xayrullayev 51'; Kolaković 90+1'	Report (in Uzbek)		Attendance: 852

8 October 2024 4	**Kokand 1912**	**1–1**	**Mashʼal**	Oʻzbekiston
16:30 UZT (UTC+5)	Gʻofurov 45+3'	Report (in Uzbek)	Abdualimov 84'	Attendance: 760

=== 23 ===
16 October 2024 1	**Aral**	**0–0**	**Mashʼal**	NOPSTTM
16:00 UZT (UTC+5)		Report (in Uzbek)		Attendance: 468

17 October 2024 2	**Shoʻrtan**	**1–1**	**Xorazm**	Gʻuzor
18:00 UZT (UTC+5)	Zoirov 84'	Report (in Uzbek)	Ismoilov 12'	Attendance: 486

18 October 2024 3	**Buxoro**	**0–1**	**Kokand 1912**	Doʻstlik
15:45 UZT (UTC+5)		Report (in Uzbek)	Kondratyuk 84'	Attendance: 115

11 November 2024 4	**Olimpik**	**1–1**	**Doʻstlik**	Doʻstlik
16:30 UZT (UTC+5)	Ibraimov 48'	Report (in Uzbek)	Alijonov 63'	Attendance: 378

=== 24 ===
23 October 2024 1	**Doʻstlik**	**0–1**	**Shoʻrtan**	Paxtakor
16:00 UZT (UTC+5)		Report (in Uzbek)	Moʻydinov 3'	Attendance: 52

23 October 2024 2	**Mashʼal**	**3–1**	**Olimpik MobiUz**	Bahrom Vafoyev
18:00 UZT (UTC+5)	Murodov 14'; Muzaffarov 79'; Joʻrayev 81'	Report (in Uzbek)	Ibraimov 5'	Attendance: 506

24 October 2024 3	**Xorazm**	**1–0**	**Buxoro**	Xorazm
15:45 UZT (UTC+5)	Bobojonov 47'	Report (in Uzbek)		Attendance: 1110

24 October 2024 4	**Kokand 1912**	**2–1**	**Aral**	Oʻzbekiston
16:30 UZT (UTC+5)	Kondratyuk 37'; Giorgadze 73'	Report (in Uzbek)	Qutiboyev 80'	Attendance: 722

=== 25 ===
28 October 2024 1	**Olimpik Mobiuz**	**1–0**	**Aral**	Doʻstlik
15:00 UZT (UTC+5)	Tuxsanov 48'	Report (in Uzbek)		Attendance: 55

29 October 2024 2	**Shoʻrtan**	**0–1**	**Mashʼal**	Gʻuzor
15:00 UZT (UTC+5)		Report (in Uzbek)	Namozov 61'	Attendance: 365

30 October 2024 3	**Buxoro**	**1–1**	**Doʻstlik**	Doʻstlik
15:00 UZT (UTC+5)	Qayumov 52'	Report (in Uzbek)	Usmonov 18'	Attendance: 126

30 October 2024 4	**Xorazm**	**1–1**	**Kokand 1912**	Xorazm
15:30 UZT (UTC+5)	Sobirov 24'	Report (in Uzbek)	Sharipov 45+1'	Attendance: 677

=== 26 ===
5 November 2024 1	**Mashʼal**	**0–1**	**Buxoro**	Bahrom Vafoyev
15:00 UZT (UTC+5)		Report (in Uzbek)	Kolaković 48'	Attendance: 1217

5 November 2024 2	**Aral**	**2–1**	**Shoʻrtan**	NOPSTTM
15:00 UZT (UTC+5)	Qutiboyev 55'; Qalmagambetov 71'	Report (in Uzbek)	Saʼdullayev 32'	Attendance: 471

6 November 2024 3	**Doʻstlik**	**0–0**	**Xorazm**	Paxtakor
15:00 UZT (UTC+5)		Report (in Uzbek)		Attendance: 219

6 November 2024 4	**Kokand 1912**	**1–0**	**Olimpik MobiUz**	Oʻzbekiston
16:00 UZT (UTC+5)	Poyonov 37'	Report (in Uzbek)		Attendance: 125

=== 27 ===
21 November 2024 1	**Doʻstlik**	**0–1**	**Kokand 1912**	Paxtakor
14:00 UZT (UTC+5)		Report (in Uzbek)	Gʻofurov 48'	Attendance: 34

21 November 2024 2	**Xorazm**	**0–0**	**Mashʼal**	Xorazm
14:00 UZT (UTC+5)		Report (in Uzbek)		Attendance: 552

22 November 2024 3	**Buxoro**	**3–2**	**Aral**	Buxoro
14:00 UZT (UTC+5)	Qayumov 48'; Mirosavlev 62'; Begić 83'	Report (in Uzbek)	Turopov 69', 75'	Attendance: 6157

22 November 2024 4	**Shoʻrtan**	**1–0**	**Olimpik MobiUz**	Gʻuzor
15:00 UZT (UTC+5)	Nuriddinov 89'	Report (in Uzbek)		Attendance: 789

=== 28 ===
28 November 2024 1	**Aral**	**3–1**	**Xorazm**	NOPSTTM
14:00 UZT (UTC+5)	Turopov 37'; Aliyev 58'; Rasulov 70'	Report (in Uzbek)	Tursunqulov 68'	Attendance: 1095

28 November 2024 2	**Kokand 1912**	**1–1**	**Shoʻrtan**	Oʻzbekiston
14:00 UZT (UTC+5)	Sharipov 49'	Report (in Uzbek)	Suvonov 14'	Attendance: 234

28 November 2024 3	**Olimpik Mobiuz**	**4–2**	**Buxoro**	Doʻstlik
14:00 UZT (UTC+5)	Tuxsanov 21'; Raimov 26'; Komilov 55', 81'	Report (in Uzbek)	Joʻrayev 44'; Qayumov 62'	Attendance: 65

28 November 2024 4	**Mashʼal**	**3–0**	**Doʻstlik**	Bahrom Vafoyev
14:00 UZT (UTC+5)	Murtozoyev 31', 35'; Samariddinov 90+4'	Report (in Uzbek)		Attendance: 1850

== Results ==
=== Results table ===
Home \ Away	ARA	BUX	DOS	KOK	MAS	OLY	SHU	KHO	ARA	BUX	DOS	KOK	MAS	OLY	SHU	KHO
Aral Nukus	—	0–0	1–0	1–3	1–1	6–0	2–0	0–0	—	1–0	2–1	0–0	0–0	1–1	2–1	3–1
Bukhara	3–0	—	2–2	0–0	0–0	4–1	3–0	0–0	3–2	—	1–1	0–1	0–1	5–0	3–0	3–1
Dustlik Tashkent	1–3	0–2	—	1–1	2–4	1–2	1–2	1–3	2–1	1–2	—	0–1	1–2	2–1	0–1	0–0
Kokand 1912	1–2	0–1	2–0	—	3–2	0–1	0–3	3–0	2–1	0–1	1–0	—	1–1	1–0	1–1	1–0
Mash'al Mubarek	1–0	1–0	2–0	0–0	—	3–0	2–0	4–0	3–0	0–1	3–0	0–1	—	3–1	3–1	2–1
Olimpik-Mobiuz	1–1	0–1	1–2	1–2	0–0	—	2–2	0–1	1–0	4–2	1–1	2–2	0–1	—	1–1	1–1
Shurtan Guzar	1–1	0–0	2–0	1–0	2–1	3–0	—	1–0	4–0	1–2	3–1	1–1	0–1	1–0	—	1–1
Xorazm Urganch	0–1	0–1	1–0	0–0	0–0	0–2	2–1	—	3–1	1–0	0–2	1–1	0–0	1–1	0–0	—

Updated to match(es) played on 14 July 2024. Source: UzPFL league
Legend: Blue = home team win; Yellow = draw; Red = away team win.

=== Results by match played ===
Team ╲ Round	1	2	3	4	5	6	7	8	9	10	11	12	13	14	15	16	17	18	19	20	21	22	23	24	25	26	27	28
Aral Nukus	W	L	L	W	D	D	W	W	D	W	D	W	L	D	W	L	D	D	L	W	L	L	D	L	L	W	L	W
Bukhara	D	W	D	W	D	D	W	W	D	W	D	L	W	W	W	W	W	W	L	L	W	W	L	L	D	W	W	L
Dustlik Tashkent	L	L	L	L	L	L	L	L	W	L	D	L	D	L	L	W	L	L	W	L	L	W	D	L	D	D	L	L
Mash'al Mubarek	D	W	D	W	D	W	W	L	D	W	L	W	D	W	L	W	W	W	W	W	W	D	D	W	W	L	D	W
Olimpik-Mobiuz	L	W	D	L	L	D	L	W	L	L	D	W	L	L	D	L	L	D	D	D	L	D	D	L	W	L	L	W
Kokand 1912	D	L	W	W	W	W	L	W	D	L	D	L	D	L	W	L	D	W	D	W	D	D	W	W	D	W	W	D
Xorazm Urganch	W	W	D	L	W	L	L	L	L	L	D	W	D	D	D	D	L	L	L	L	W	D	D	W	D	D	D	L
Shurtan Guzar	D	L	W	L	D	D	W	L	W	W	W	L	W	W	L	D	W	L	W	D	D	L	D	W	L	L	W	W

Updated to match(es) played on 1 December 2024. Source: Championat.asia
W = Win; D = Draw; L = Loss; P = Postponed

=== Round 1–14 ===
Team ╲ Round	1	2	3	4	5	6	7	8	9	10	11	12	13	14
Aral Nukus	1	4	7	5	5	5	4	4	4	3	3	2	3	4
Bukhara	5	2	2	2	4	3	2	1	1	1	1	3	1	1
Dustlik Tashkent	7	8	8	8	8	8	8	8	8	8	8	8	8	8
Mash'al Mubarek	4	3	3	1	3	2	1	3	3	2	2	1	2	2
Olimpik-Mobiuz	7	5	6	7	7	7	7	7	7	7	7	7	7	7
Kokand 1912	3	6	4	3	1	1	3	2	2	4	4	4	5	5
Xorazm Urganch	2	1	1	4	2	4	5	5	6	6	6	6	6	6
Shurtan Guzar	6	7	5	6	6	6	6	6	5	5	5	5	4	3

Updated to match(es) played on 29 June 2024. Source: UzPFL league

=== Round 15–28 ===
Team ╲ Round	15	16	17	18	19	20	21	22	23	24	25	26	27	28
Aral	3	3	4	3	4	3	4	4	5	5	5	5	5	5
Buxoro	1	1	1	1	1	2	2	1	2	2	2	2	2	2
Doʻstlik Toshkent	8	8	8	8	8	8	8	8	8	8	8	8	8	8
Mashʼal	2	2	2	2	2	1	1	2	1	1	1	1	1	1
Olimpik MobiUZ	7	7	7	7	7	7	7	7	7	7	7	7	7	7
Kokand 1912	5	5	5	5	5	5	5	5	3	3	3	3	3	3
Xorazm	6	6	6	6	6	6	6	6	6	6	6	6	6	6
Shoʻrtan Gʻuzor	4	4	3	4	3	4	3	3	4	4	4	4	4	4

Updated to match(es) played on November 28, 2024. Source: UzPFL league

== Relegation play-off ==
Initial stage
**1**	**Shoʻrtan**	**1**
4	Olimpik	0
**2**	**Kokand 1912**	**3 (2)**
3	**Metallurg**	1 (2)

Final stage
Olimpik	1
**Metallurg**	**2**

=== Initial stage ===
December 4, 2024
13:00 UZT

Shoʻrtan	1–0	Olimpik
Zoirov 74'	Match report

Gʻuzor
Referee: Doston Rahimov
December 4, 2024
16:00 UZT

Kokand 1912	1–1	Metallurg
Beshimov 77'	Match report	Oʻrinboyev 24'
Penalties
Gʻofurov (penalty missed); Hakimov (penalty missed); Husanov (penalty scored); Malikjonov (penalty scored); Beshimov (penalty scored)	3–2	Kucherenko (penalty scored); Qoʻziyev (penalty missed); Sattorov (penalty missed); Xayrullayev (penalty missed); Pirmuhamedov (penalty scored)

Uzbekistan, Yaypan
Referee: Shavkat Nasibullayev

=== Final stage ===
December 9, 2024
UZT

Olimpik	1–2	Metallurg
Islomov 60'	Match report	Oʻrinboyev 11'; Neʼmatjonov 32'

Bunyodkor, Tashkent
Attendance: 769
Referee: Ahrol Risqullayev

== Season statistics ==
=== Goalscorers ===
As of match played 28 November 2024

Rank	Player	Club	Goals
1	(Uzbekistan) Khumoyun Murtozoyev	Mash'al Mubarek	16
2	(Bosnia and Herzegovina) Dominik Begić	Bukhara	13
3	(Uzbekistan) Mukhriddin Zoirov	Shurtan Guzar	9
4	(Uzbekistan) Sherzod Kodirov	Dustlik Tashkent	8
5	(Serbia) Marko Kolaković	Bukhara	7
5	(Uzbekistan) Shakhboz Nuriddinov	Shurtan Guzar	7
7	(Uzbekistan) Daler Tukhsanov	Dustlik Tashkent	6
7	(Uzbekistan) Salamat Kutybaev	Aral Nukus	6
9	(Uzbekistan) Anvar Murodov	Mash'al Mubarek	5
9	(Ukraine) Serhiy Petrov	Kokand 1912	5
9	(Ukraine) Yegor Kondratyuk	Kokand 1912	5
9	(Uzbekistan) Asilbek Kayumov	Bukhara	5
9	(Croatia) Frane Ikić	Bukhara	5
9	(Uzbekistan) Ruslan Qalmagambetov	Aral Nukus	5

Own goals

- (Uzbekistan) Shukurali Pulatov of Shurtan Guzar against Bukhara -
- (Uzbekistan) Jasur Azimov of Mash'al Mubarek against Dustlik Tashkent -
- (Serbia) Marko Kolaković of Bukhara against Olimpik-Mobiuz -
- (Uzbekistan) Mashkhur Mukhammadzhonov of Xorazm Urganch against Kokand 1912 -
- (Uzbekistan) Ilkhom Ubaydullaev of Dustlik Tashkent against Mash'al Mubarek -
- (Uzbekistan) Doniyor Ismoilov of Kokand 1912 against Mash'al Mubarek -
- (Uzbekistan) Ulugbek Khudoyberdiev of Shurtan Guzar against Xorazm Urganch -
- (Uzbekistan) Ulugbek Khudoyberdiev of Shurtan Guzar against Bukhara -

=== Hat-tricks ===
Player	For	Against	Result	Date	Ref
(Ukraine) Serhiy Petrov	Kokand 1912	Olimpik-Mobiuz	3–1 (H)	8 April 2024	
(Croatia) Frane Ikić	Bukhara	Olimpik-Mobiuz	4–1 (H)	10 May 2024	
(Bosnia and Herzegovina) Dominik Begić	Bukhara	Olimpik-Mobiuz	5–0 (H)	24 September 2024	

- ^{4} Player scored 4 goals

=== Clean sheets ===
As of match played 14 July 2024

Rank	Player	Club	Goals
1	(Uzbekistan) Shirinboy Abdullaev	Bukhara	11
2	(Uzbekistan) Umid Khamroev	Mash'al Mubarek	9
3	(Uzbekistan) Nizomiddin Ziyovutdinov	Aral Nukus	4
4	(Uzbekistan) Mirzokhid Mamatkhonov	Shurtan Guzar	4
5	(Uzbekistan) Mashkhur Mukhammadzhonov	Xorazm Urganch	4
6	(Uzbekistan) Azizkhon Isokov	Kokand 1912	3
7	(Uzbekistan) Samandar Murodboev	Olimpik-Mobiuz	3
8	(Uzbekistan) Khozhiakbar Juraev	Xorazm Urganch	2
9	(Uzbekistan) Islom Abdullaev	Kokand 1912	2
10	(Uzbekistan) Sherzod Abduraimov*	Shurtan Guzar	2
11	(Uzbekistan) Shokhdzhakhon Nasimov	Aral Nukus	2
12	(Uzbekistan) Vladimir Vagin	Mash'al Mubarek	1

=== Attendances ===
As of match played 14 July 2023

==== By round ====
2024 Uzbekistan Pro League Attendance
Round	Total	GP.	Avg. Per Game
1-tur	2,433	4	608
2-tur	2,774	4	694
3-tur	1,862	4	466
4-tur	4,550	4	1,138
5-tur	1,922	4	481
6-tur	1,215	4	304
7-tur	6,299	4	1,575
8-tur	5,204	4	1,301
9-tur	1,909	4	477
10-tur	2,522	4	631
11-tur	3,603	4	901
12-tur	2,906	3	727
13-tur	2,750	4	688
14-tur	2,663	4	666
Umumiy	42,612	56	761

==== By team ====
Team \ Match played	1	2	3	4	5	6	7	8	9	10	11	12	13	14	Jami	Oʻrtacha
Aral Nukus	890	760	1,200	477	658	522	487								4,994	713
Bukhara	170	130	78	160	388	266	228								1,420	203
Dustlik Tashkent	216	1,042	207	118	78	113	116								1,890	270
Mash'al Mubarek	382	310	1652	452	913	1,983	1,501								7,193	1,028
Olimpik-Mobiuz	155	108	55	73	85	247	160								883	126
Kokand 1912	394	656	213	344	286	515	288								2,696	385
Shurtan Guzar	1,006	824	612	707	778	620	587								5,134	733
Xorazm Urganch	1,854	1,125	5,307	4,582	1,245	2,470	1,819								18,402	2,629

== See also ==
- 2024 Uzbekistan Super League
- 2024 Uzbekistan First League
- 2024 Uzbekistan Cup
