= Marko Kolaković =

Serbian footballer

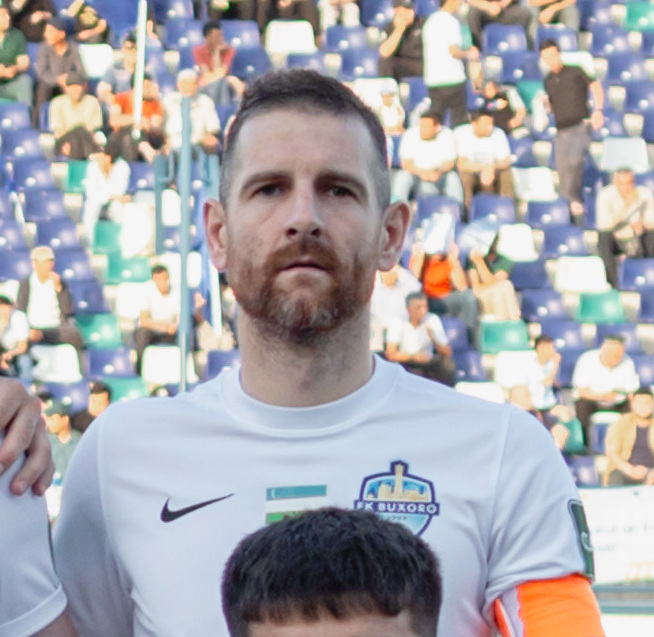
- Kolaković with Bukhara in April 2025

Personal information
- Full name: Marko Kolaković
- Date of birth: 9 February 1993 (age 33)
- Place of birth: Ivanjica, FR Yugoslavia
- Height: 1.85 m (6 ft 1 in)
- Position: Defender

Team information
- Current team: Javor Ivanjica
- Number: 30

Youth career
- Javor Ivanjica

Senior career*
| Years | Team | Apps | (Gls) |
| 2012–2020 | Javor Ivanjica | 129 | (3) |
| 2013 | → Rudar Kostolac (loan) | 26 | (3) |
| 2020–2023 | Sogdiana | 96 | (6) |
| 2024–2025 | Bukhara | 34 | (7) |
| 2026– | Javor Ivanjica | 1 | (0) |
- * Club domestic league appearances and goals as of 13 June 2026

Marko Kolaković (Serbian Cyrillic: Марко Колаковић; born 9 February 1993) is a Serbian professional footballer who plays as a defender for Javor Ivanjica.

== Professional career ==
Kolaković made his professional career debut in 2011–12 season with his hometown club Javor Ivanjica, after spending the entire youth career with the club. In winter's transfer window of 2012–13 season, he was loaned to fourth-tier Serbian League West club Rudar Kostolac where he stayed for one year. In winter's transfer window of 2013–14 season, he rejoined Javor Ivanjica.

In 2014–15 season, he became the team starter, appearing in 26 games of the 2014–15 Serbian First League season. In the coming seasons, he became team's captain.

In winter's transfer window of 2019–20 season, Kolaković signed a contract with the Uzbekistan Super League club Sogdiana.

In January 2026, Kolaković returned to Javor Ivanjica after six years.

== Career statistics ==
As of 4 May 2026

| Club | Season | League | | | Cup | | Continental | | Other | | Total | |
| Club | Season | Division | Apps | Goals | Apps | Goals | Apps | Goals | Apps | Goals | Apps | Goals |
|---|---|---|---|---|---|---|---|---|---|---|---|---|
| Javor Ivanjica | 2011–12 | Serbian SuperLiga | 1 | 0 | 0 | 0 | – | – | – | – | 1 | 0 |
| Javor Ivanjica | 2012–13 | Serbian SuperLiga | 1 | 0 | 0 | 0 | – | – | – | – | 1 | 0 |
| Javor Ivanjica | 2013–14 | Serbian SuperLiga | 2 | 0 | 0 | 0 | – | – | – | – | 2 | 0 |
| Javor Ivanjica | 2014–15 | Serbian First League | 26 | 0 | 1 | 0 | – | – | – | – | 27 | 0 |
| Javor Ivanjica | 2015–16 | Serbian SuperLiga | 13 | 1 | 1 | 0 | – | – | – | – | 14 | 1 |
| Javor Ivanjica | 2016–17 | Serbian SuperLiga | 6 | 0 | 2 | 0 | – | – | – | – | 8 | 0 |
| Javor Ivanjica | 2017–18 | Serbian SuperLiga | 20 | 0 | 3 | 0 | – | – | – | – | 23 | 0 |
| Javor Ivanjica | 2018–19 | Serbian First League | 35 | 1 | 0 | 0 | – | – | – | – | 35 | 1 |
| Javor Ivanjica | 2019–20 | Serbian SuperLiga | 19 | 1 | 0 | 0 | – | – | – | – | 19 | 1 |
| Rudar Kostolac (loan) | 2012–13 | Serbian League West | 12 | 0 | 0 | 0 | – | – | – | – | 12 | 0 |
| Rudar Kostolac (loan) | 2013–14 | Serbian League West | 14 | 3 | 0 | 0 | – | – | – | – | 14 | 3 |
| Sogdiana | 2020 | Uzbekistan Super League | 23 | 3 | 0 | 0 | – | – | – | – | 23 | 3 |
| Sogdiana | 2021 | Uzbekistan Super League | 24 | 1 | 5 | 0 | – | – | – | – | 29 | 1 |
| Sogdiana | 2022 | Uzbekistan Super League | 25 | 1 | 5 | 1 | 6 (Note: Appearances in AFC Cup) | 1 | – | – | 29 | 3 |
| Sogdiana | 2023 | Uzbekistan Super League | 24 | 1 | 3 | 2 | - | - | – | – | 27 | 3 |
| Bukhara | 2024 | Uzbekistan Pro League | 8 | 7 | 4 | 0 | – | – | – | – | 12 | 7 |
| Bukhara | 2025 | Uzbekistan Super League | 26 | 0 | 0 | 0 | – | – | – | – | 26 | 0 |
| Javor Ivanjica | 2025–26 | Serbian SuperLiga | 0 | 0 | 0 | 0 | – | – | – | – | 0 | 0 |
| Total | | | 269 | 19 | 24 | 3 | 6 | 1 | – | – | 299 | 23 |
