= Muhammad Yuldashev =

Uzbekistani footballer

Muhammad Yoʻldoshev
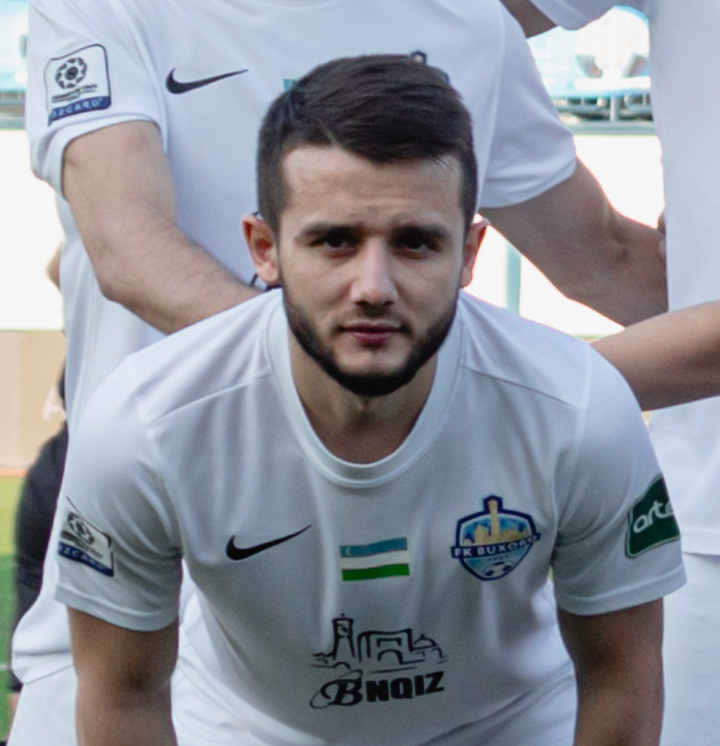

Personal information
- Date of birth: 17 February 1999 (age 27)
- Place of birth: Jizzakh, Uzbekistan
- Height: 1.78 m (5 ft 10 in)
- Position: Midfielder

Team information
- Current team: Bukhara
- Number: 27

Senior career*
Years	Team	Apps	(Gls)
2029–2020	Sogdiana		
2020	Andijon	19	(1)
2021–2022	Mash'al	44	(0)
2023	Sogdiana	8	(0)
2024	Mash'al	23	(0)
2025–	Bukhara	43	(0)
- * Club domestic league appearances and goals as of 28 July 2026

Muhammad Yuldashev (Uzbek: Muhammad Yoʻldoshev, born 17 February 1999) is an Uzbekistani professional footballer who plays as a midfielder for Bukhara.

== Honours ==
=== Club ===
Bukhara

Uzbekistan Cup runner-up: 2025

Mash'al

Uzbekistan Pro League runner-up: 2024
