= FC Bukhara =

Uzbek football club

Buxoro
- Full name: Futbol Klubi Buxoro
- Nickname: Steppe Warriors (Uzbek: Choʻl jangchilari)
- Founded: 1989; 37 years ago
- Ground: Buxoro Arena
- Capacity: 22,700
- Manager: Ulugbek Bakayev
- League: Uzbekistan Pro League
- 2025: Uzbekistan Super League, 15th of 16
- Website: bukhara-pfc.uz
Home colours	Away colours

FK Buxoro (Uzbek: Futbol Klubi Buxoro) is an Uzbek professional football club based in Bukhara. Founded in 1989, the club competes in the Uzbekistan Super League.

== History ==
The old club logo in 2009–12

The club was founded in 1960 under the name Bukhoro. In 1989 the club was renamed to Nurafshon. During the 1990 season the club played in the Soviet Second League, zone "East", finishing in 4th position. Buxoro played its first Oliy League season in 1992. Their best performance in Oliy League is runners-up of the 1994 season to Neftchi Farg'ona.

FK Bukhoro played three times in semi-final of Uzbek Cup. In the 2005 Cup semi-final the club lost to Neftchi Farg'ona in two legs by 1–3 and in 2012 lost to Nasaf with a 3–5 score. After the 2013 season had finished, on 10 November 2013 Edgar Gess became new head coach of Bukhoro, replacing Tachmurad Agamuradov in this position.

=== Name changes ===
- 1960–67: FC Bukhoro
- 1967–80: Fakel Bukhoro
- 1980–88: FC Bukhoro
- 1989–97: Nurafshon Buxoro
- 1997–2021: FK Buxoro
- 2021 (since September): Nurafshon Buxoro
- 2022–: FK Buxoro

=== Domestic history ===
Season	League									Uzbekistan Cup	Top goalscorer		Manager
Season	Div.	Pos.	Pl.	W	D	L	GS	GA	P	Uzbekistan Cup	Name	League	Manager
1991	SSL	4th	42	20	9	13	72	45	49				(Russia) Stanislav Kaminskiy
1992	1st	4th	32	20	7	5	59	23	47	R32	(Uzbekistan) Yuriy Ageev	15	(Russia) Stanislav Kaminskiy
1993	1st	5th	30	15	5	10	46	32	35	R32	(Uzbekistan) Mikhail Fomin	9	(Russia) Boris Lavrov
1994	1st	2nd	30	20	4	6	63	31	44	Quarter-final	(Uzbekistan) Olim Tillyaev	19	(Russia) Alexander Ivankov
1995	1st	5th	30	13	1	16	39	26	40	Quarter-final			(Uzbekistan) Mustafa Belyalov
1996	1st	5th	30	15	5	10	52	39	50	Quarter-final	(Uzbekistan) Yuriy Ageev	12	(Uzbekistan) Islom Akhmedov (Uzbekistan) Igor Plyugin
1997	1st	7th	34	16	5	13	57	55	53	Quarter-final			(Russia) Stanislav Kaminskiy
1998	1st	6th	30	13	4	13	51	50	43	Quarter-final			(Russia) Stanislav Kaminskiy (Tajikistan) Khakim Fuzailov
1999	1st	9th	30	10	7	13	44	50	37	-			(Tajikistan) Khakim Fuzailov
2000	1st	6th	38	20	5	13	73	60	65	R32			(Uzbekistan) Usmon Toshev
2001	1st	8th	34	15	3	16	57	58	48	Semi-final			(Uzbekistan) Usmon Toshev
2002	1st	7th	30	12	5	13	37	53	41	R16			(Uzbekistan) Usmon Toshev
2003	1st	12th	30	10	2	18	48	56	32	Quarter-final			(Uzbekistan) Usmon Toshev
2004	1st	7th	26	10	3	13	31	45	30 (Note: 3 points deducted for non-payment of participation fees)	Quarter-final	(Uzbekistan) Rahmat Inogamov	8	(Uzbekistan) Usmon Toshev
2005	1st	12th	26	9	2	15	37	59	29	Semi-final	(Uzbekistan) Alisher Kholiqov	6	(Uzbekistan) Usmon Toshev
2006	1st	11th	30	9	7	14	35	34	34	Quarter-final	(Uzbekistan) Alisher Kholiqov	9	(Uzbekistan) Usmon Toshev
2007	1st	9th	30	11	3	16	29	43	36	R16			(Uzbekistan) Usmon Toshev
2008	1st	15th	30	7	5	18	25	44	26	Quarter-final	(Uzbekistan) Lochin Soliev	8	(Uzbekistan) Usmon Toshev
2009	1st	15th	30	6	6	18	40	59	24	Quarter-final			(Uzbekistan) Rauf Inileev
2010	2nd	1st	30	24	2	4	71	21	74	R32	(Uzbekistan) Abdulatif Juraev	27	(Uzbekistan) Rauf Inileev (Uzbekistan) Gennadiy Kochnev
2011	1st	9th	26	8	7	11	23	38	31	R32	(Uzbekistan) Sukhrob Nematov	7	(Uzbekistan) Gennadiy Kochnev
2012	1st	7th	26	10	5	11	24	31	35	Semi-final	(Uzbekistan) Vokhid Shodiev	5	(Uzbekistan) Jamshid Saidov (Turkmenistan) Täçmyrat Agamyradow
2013	1st	6th	26	10	3	13	33	44	33	R16	(Uzbekistan) Vokhid Shodiev	12	(Turkmenistan) Täçmyrat Agamyradow
2014	1st	12th	26	6	7	13	22	42	25	R32	(Uzbekistan) Sukhrob Nematov (Uzbekistan) Ulugbek Bakayev (Serbia) Predrag Vujović	3	(Germany) Edgar Gess (Turkmenistan) Said Seýidow (interim) (Uzbekistan) Alexander Mochinov
2015	1st	14th	30	7	5	18	31	53	26	R16	(Uzbekistan) Aziz Ibragimov	10	(Uzbekistan) Alexander Mochinov (Uzbekistan) Shukhrat Fayziev (interim) (Uzbekistan) Jamshid Saidov
2016	1st	4th	30	17	7	6	42	27	58	Semi-final	(Uzbekistan) Aziz Ibragimov	10	(Uzbekistan) Jamshid Saidov
2017	1st	6th	30	13	7	10	42	20	46	Quarter-final	(Uzbekistan) Ivan Nagaev	10	(Uzbekistan) Ulugbek Bakayev
2018	1st	6th	20	3	1	16	14	41	10	R32	(Turkmenistan) Arslanmyrat Amanow	5	(Uzbekistan) Ulugbek Bakayev
2019	1st	12th	26	5	9	12	18	37	24	R32	(Uzbekistan) Doston Ibragimov	3	(Uzbekistan) Bakhtiyor Ashurmatov (Tajikistan) Mukhsin Mukhamadiev
2020	1st	15th	26	1	11	14	19	50	14	R16	(Uzbekistan) Izzatilla Abdullaev (Uzbekistan) Jasurbek Khakimov (Uzbekistan) Bekhruz Sadullaev	3	(Tajikistan) Mukhsin Mukhamadiev (Mexico) Julio Hernandeź (Uzbekistan) Jamshid Saidov
2021	2nd	4th	20	9	4	7	22	14	31				
2022	2nd	2nd	26	14	8	4	46	13	50				
2023	1st	14th	26	4	3	19	12	35	15				
2024	2nd	2nd	26	15	7	6	40	18	52				

== Current squad ==
As of 28 July 2026

Note: Flags indicate national team as defined under FIFA eligibility rules; some limited exceptions apply. Players may hold more than one non-FIFA nationality.

No.	Pos.	Nation	Player
1	GK	UZB	Shirinboy Abdullaev
2	DF	SRB	Veljko Filipović
4	DF	UZB	Nodirbek Akhmadjanov
5	DF	UZB	Sardor Kulmatov
6	MF	UZB	Ravshan Khayrullaev
7	DF	UZB	Khurshidbek Mukhtorov
8	MF	UZB	Anvar Juraev
9	FW	GEO	Nika Kacharava
10	FW	UZB	Shakhzod Ubaydullaev
11	FW	UZB	Temur Mamasidikov
12	GK	UZB	Umid Khamroev
13	GK	UZB	Azizkhon Isokov
14	DF	UZB	Islombek Baratov
16	GK	UZB	Shokhjakhon Saidkulov

No.	Pos.	Nation	Player
17	MF	UZB	Javokhir Ruziev
18	MF	UZB	Ozodbek Rajabov
19	MF	UZB	Abbos Umarov
21	MF	GEO	Mikheil Basheleishvili
22	FW	UZB	Asadbek Joraboev
25	MF	UZB	Sherzod Esanov
27	DF	UZB	Muhammad Yuldashev
30	DF	SRB	Bojan Mlađović
42	DF	UZB	Kirill Todorov
77	FW	UZB	Asilbek Kayumov
78	DF	MNE	Vladimir Rodić
88	FW	BIH	Dominik Begić
92	MF	UZB	Nikita Karpenko
97	DF	UZB	Shakhboz Jurabekov

== Honours ==
- Uzbek League
  - Runners-up (1): 1994
- Uzbekistan First League
  - Champions (1): 2010

== Managerial history ==
- (Soviet Union) Oleg Bugaev (1990)
- (Russia) Stanislav Kaminskiy (1991–92)
- (Russia) Boris Lavrov (1993)
- (Russia) Alexander Ivankov (1994)
- (Uzbekistan) Mustafa Belyalov (1995)
- (Uzbekistan) Islom Akhmedov (1996)
- (Uzbekistan) Igor Plyugin (1996)
- (Russia) Stanislav Kaminskiy (1997–98)
- (Tajikistan) Khakim Fuzailov (1998–99)
- (Uzbekistan) Usmon Toshev (2000–08)
- (Uzbekistan) Rauf Inileev (2009–10)
- (Uzbekistan) Gennadiy Kochnev (2010–11)
- (Uzbekistan) Jamshid Saidov (2012)
- (Turkmenistan) Tachmurad Agamuradov (2012–13)
- (Germany) Edgar Gess (2014)
- (Turkmenistan) Said Seýidow (interim) (2014)
- (Uzbekistan) Alexander Mochinov (2014 – May 17, 2015)
- (Uzbekistan) Shukhrat Fayziev (interim) (May 21, 2015 – July 5, 2015)
- (Uzbekistan) Jamshid Saidov (July 5, 2015 – January 26, 2017)
- (Uzbekistan) Ulugbek Bakayev (January 26, 2017– )
