= Mustafa Belyalov =

Soviet footballer

Personal information
- Full name: Mustafa Osmanovich Belyalov
- Date of birth: 6 April 1957 (age 69)
- Place of birth: Sovetabod, Uzbek SSR, Soviet Union
- Height: 1.79 m (5 ft 10 in)
- Position: Defender

Senior career*
Years	Team	Apps	(Gls)
1977–1979	Pamir Dushanbe		
1980	SKA Lviv		
1981–1984	FC Pakhtakor Tashkent		
1985–1987	Neftchi Baku		
1988–1990	FC Pakhtakor Tashkent		
1990–1992	Nuravshon Bukhara		
1993–1994	Perak FA		

International career^{‡}
1992	Uzbekistan	7	(0)
- * Club domestic league appearances and goals as of 15 December 2010 ‡ National team caps and goals as of 15 December 2010

Mustafa Osmanovich Belyalov (Russian: Мустафа Османович Белялов; born 4 June 1957) also known as Mustafa Belyalov or Moustava Belialov is an Uzbekistani retired football player, who played as a defender.

== Career ==
He spends his career mostly in his native Uzbekistan where he played for Pakhtakor in two stints, and Nuravshon Bukhara. He also played for clubs in the former Soviet League such as Neftchi Baku, Pamir Dushanbe and SKA Lviv. Towards the end of his career, he played in Malaysia for Perak FA.

He represented Uzbekistan national football team 7 times, all in 1992. He played for the Olympic Team of USSR in 1983.

== Honors ==
- 3rd place in Uzbekistan Footballer of the Year 1992
