= Rauf Inileev =

Personal information
- Full name: Rauf Talgatovich Inileev
- Date of birth: 8 September 1950 (age 76)
- Place of birth: Tashkent, Soviet Union

Senior career*
| Years | Team | Apps | (Gls) |
| 1973–1975 | Pakhtakor Tashkent | | |
- Mekhnat Jizzakh
- Start Tashkent
- Zvezda Jizzakh

Managerial career
- Zvezda Jizzakh
- 1993–1996: Chilanzar Tashkent
- 1997–2000: Sogdiana Jizzakh
- Shurtan Guzar
- Andijan
- 2006–2007: Uzbekistan U-23
- 2007–2008: Uzbekistan
- 2009–2010: Bukhoro
- 2010–2011: Sogdiana Jizzakh
- 2014: Maktaaral
- 2016–2017: Obod
- * Club domestic league appearances and goals

Rauf Talgatovich Inileev (Russian: Рауф Талгатович Инилеев) (born 8 September 1950) is a football manager and former player.

== Playing career ==
In 1973, he joined Pakhtakor Tashkent and played for the reserve team. He then moved to the club Mekhnat Jizzakh.

== Managing career ==
He began his managing career at Zvezda Jizzakh where he finished playing as a footballer. In 1993, he was coach of Chilanzar Tashkent, which in 1997 under his management was promoted to the major Uzbek League. From 1996 to 2000 Inileev was manager of Sogdiana Jizzakh. In 2006, he was assigned as manager of Uzbekistan U-23. As coach of Uzbekistan U-23 Inileev guided the U-23 team to the last eight of the 2006 Asian Games in Doha.

On 31 December 2006 he was appointed as coach of Uzbekistan after Valeri Nepomniachi. Mirjalol Kasymov was assigned as assistant coach of national team. On 28 November 2007 AFC named Rauf Inileev as AFC Asian Coach of Year for the impressive campaign of the national team at the 2007 AFC Asian Cup. After an unsuccessful start in the fourth round of 2010 FIFA World Cup qualification, Inileev was sacked and Mirjalol Kasymov was appointed as his successor on 19 September 2008.

In January 2009, he signed a 2-year contract with FK Buxoro, but one year later he was sacked because of the unsuccessful performance of the club during the 2009 season.

On 22 March 2010 he was appointed as head coach to Sogdiana Jizzakh which relegated to First League after 2009 Uzbek League season. One year later Inileev promoted with Sogdiana back to top division, after finishing in 2010 Uzbekistan First League runner-up after FK Buxoro. In July 2011 Inileev resigned his position after the club's poor results in season first half.

On 21 January 2014 Inileev signed a contract with FC Maktaaral, club in Kazakhstan First Division On 30 June 2014 he resigned from his post and left Maktaaral.

== Honours ==
=== Manager ===
- Uzbekistan Coach of the Year (1): 2007
- AFC Coach of Year : 2007
