= Khurshidbek Mukhtorov =

Uzbek footballer

Personal information
- Full name: Khurshidbek Alizhon ogly Mukhtorov
- Date of birth: 9 February 1994 (age 32)
- Place of birth: Gulistan, Uzbekistan
- Height: 1.89 m (6 ft 2 in)
- Position: Centre-back

Team information
- Current team: Buxoro
- Number: 7

Youth career
- 2012–2013: Guliston
- 2014: Lokomotiv Tashkent

Senior career*
Years	Team	Apps	(Gls)
2015	Kokand 1912	2	(0)
2015	Sogdiana Jizzakh	9	(0)
2016	Lokomotiv Tashkent	1	(0)
2017–2018	AGMK	43	(1)
2018–2020	Nasaf Qarshi	35	(1)
2020–2021	Navbahor Namangan	20	(0)
2021–2022	Lokomotiv Tashkent	36	(2)
2023	Turon	21	(4)
2024–2025	Neftchi Fergana	8	(0)
2025	Turan	11	(1)
2025	Persik Kediri	14	(0)
2026–	Buxoro	13	(1)
- * Club domestic league appearances and goals as of 28 July 2026

Khurshidbek Mukhtorov (Russian: Хуршидбек Алижон оглы Мухторов; born 9 February 1994) is an Uzbek professional footballer who plays as a centre-back for Buxoro.

== Club career ==
Mukhtorov began his career at the Sirdaryo Soccer School. He began his professional career in the 2012 season as part of the Sirdaryo Region club Guliston. Mukhtorov caught the attention of Vadim Abramov due to his tall stature and quickness in defense, and in 2014 he signed a contract with Lokomotiv Tashkent Due to the competition in the squad, he mainly played in the games of the youth team.

He returned to Lokomotiv before the 2016 season, he previously played for Kokand 1912 and Sogdiana in 2015. During his second visit to Tashkent, he was not included in the first team due to competition in the squad and played in 1 match during the first half of the season. In the second half of the season, he terminated his contract with the railwaymen and joined AGMK.

In 2018, he moved from AGMK to Nasaf. He played for the club for a season and a half. And he scored 1 goal in 40 games. He signed a contract with Namangan's Navbahor team before the 2020 season. He returned to Lokomotiv in 2021 season. And he played for two seasons, this time, Mukhtorov became one of the team's main players and played more than 40 games over two years, scoring 2 goals. He officially left Lokomotiv before the 2023 season Ahead of 2023 season, Mukhtorov was signed with Turon. He had his most productive season with Turon. Despite being a defender, he played 25 appearances during the season, scoring 5 goals and assisting 1 goal. After his contract with Turon expired at the end of the season, he joined Neftchi's youth team before the new season. In January 2024, he signed a contract with Neftchi Fergana.

=== Turan ===
Mukhtorov left Neftchi before the 2025 season and signed a contract with Turan of Kazakhstan Premier League. He made his league debut for the club on 2 March 2025 as a starter in a 2–0 home win over Okzhetpes.

=== Persik Kediri ===
On 25 July 2025, Persik Kediri officially announced the signing of Mukhtorov to strengthen their back line ahead of the Super League 2025–26 season. Manager M. Syahid Nur Ichsan highlighted his recruitment as key improvement for the team's defensive options.

== Style of play ==
Standing at 1.89 m, Mukhtorov is a physical, left-footed centre-back, capable of also filling in at left-back. He is particularly strong in aerial duels and is known for his leadership and experience in AFC Champions League matches.

== Honours ==
Lokomotiv Tashkent

- Uzbek League: 2016

FC AGMK

- Uzbekistan Cup: 2018
