= Dominik Begić =

Bosnian footballer

Personal information
- Full name: Dominik Begić
- Date of birth: August 3, 1997 (age 29)
- Place of birth: Mostar, Bosnia and Herzegovina
- Position: Forward

Team information
- Current team: Bukhara
- Number: 88

Senior career*
Years	Team	Apps	(Gls)
2016-2018	Posusje		
2018	Čapljina	12	(0)
2018	Posusje		
2019	Imotski		
2019-2024	Posusje	83	(13)
2024-	Bukhara	47	(20)
- * Club domestic league appearances and goals as of 10 February 2026

Dominik Begić (Bosnian: Dominik Begić; born 3 August 1997, Mostar) is a Bosnian professional footballer who plays as a forward. He currently plays for Bukhara, a participant in Uzbekistan Super League.

== Playing career ==
During his career, he has mainly played for Bosnia's HSK Posusje. In the 2024 season, he signed a contract with Bukhara, which began the season in the Uzbekistan Pro League.

== Honours ==
=== Club ===
Bukhara

- Uzbekistan Cup runner-up: 2025

HSK Posusje

- Bosnia Second League winner: 2020/2021
