= 2025 Uzbekistan First League =

Football match of the third division in Uzbekistan football league system

Uzbekistan First League
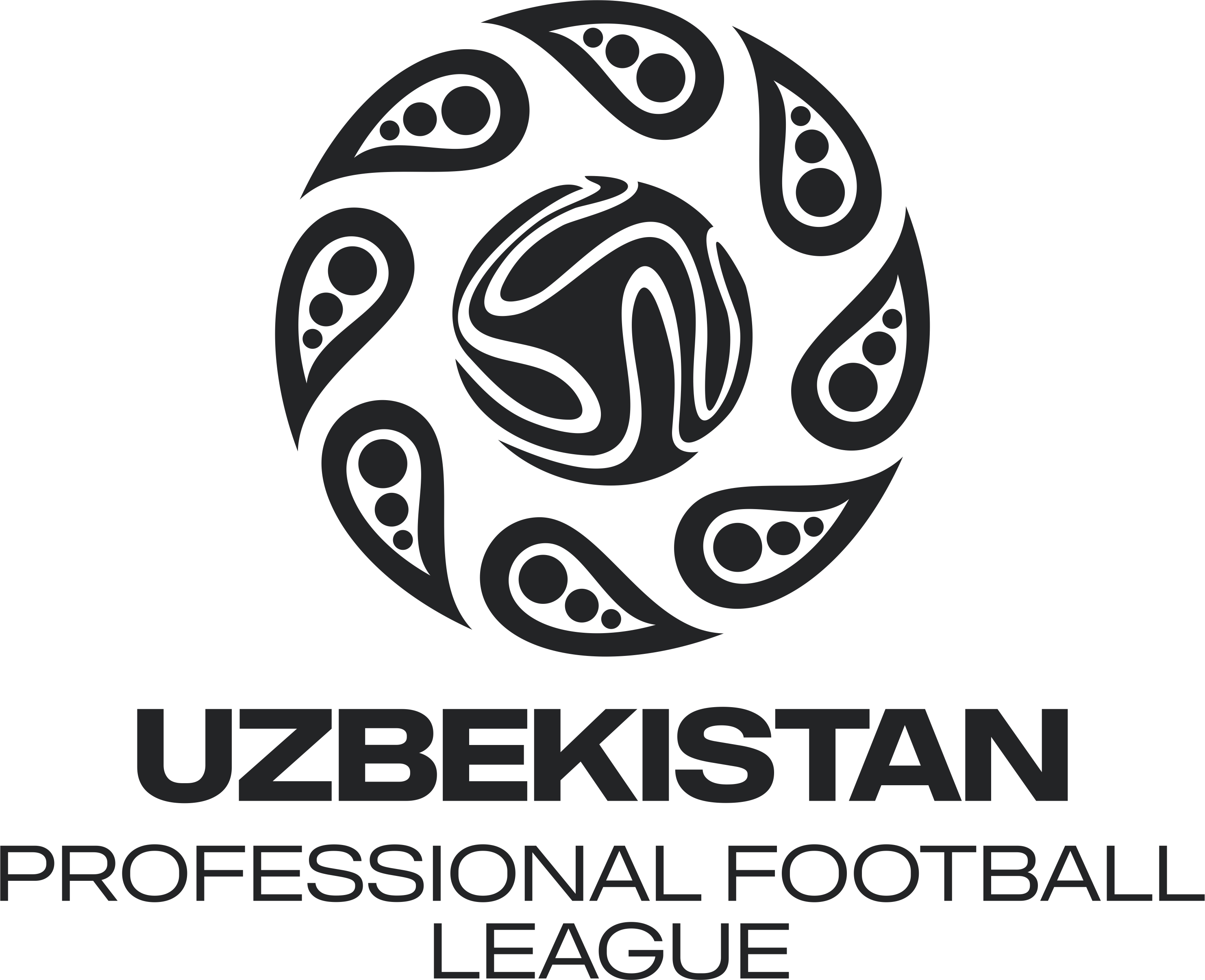
- Season: 2025
- Champions: Zomin (1st); BuxDU (2nd); Doʻstlik (3rd)
- Relegated: Tashkent VFA
- Matches: 282
- Goals: 951 (3.37 per match)
- Top goalscorer: Abduvohid Oxtayev
- Biggest home win: Zomin 7–2 Toshkent VFA (August 16, 2025)
- Biggest away win: Fargʻona FA 0–11 Sementchi (August 9, 2025)
- Highest scoring: Fargʻona FA 0–11 Sementchi (August 9, 2025)
- Longest winning run: Zomin
- Longest losing run: Fargʻona FA
- Highest attendance: 6278 (18.04.2025, OKMK Semurgʻ – Andijon FA)
- Lowest attendance: 11 (16.10.2025, Zamin – Ahmedov FK)
- All statistics correct as of December 1, 2025.

2025 Uzbekistan First League (in Uzbek: Futbol boʻyicha 2025-yilgi Oʻzbekiston Birinchi ligasi) is the sixth season of the third division competition held by Uzbekistan Professional Football League.

In the semifinal match FC Dustlik Tashkent defeated FC Kattakurgan 2–1 to take third place. In the final, Tashkent's Zamin defeated BukhDU 3-0 and win the 2025 First League.

== Format ==
Each region has 10 teams, each of which will play nine home and nine away matches. Thus, the first stage of the competition has come to an end. A total of 15 teams from the top 5 in each region will advance to the second stage. The League will add a visiting team as the 16th team. This team will be formed from players not included in the League roster, and its name will be announced later. The teams finishing 1st and 2nd in their regions, as well as the two best third-place teams, will be placed in Pot 1 and will not play each other in the Round of 32. The visiting team and the remaining teams will form Pot 2. All teams will travel to Tashkent for the Round of 32 matches. Each pair will play two matches over three days, with the winners of both matches advancing to the quarterfinals. The eight winners will then continue to compete for the title in Tashkent (as in previous season). There will be no pot draw in the quarterfinals.

If two or more teams have the same number of points in the standings, their positions will be determined as follows in accordance with the competition regulations.

- based on the results of mutual meeting(s);
- by the difference between the number of goals saved and conceded in all matches;
- by the number of balls saved in all matches;
- by the number of balls hit on the opponent's field in all matches;
- by the number of wins achieved in all matches;
- by the number of wins achieved in away matches in all meetings;
- taking into account the influence of the number of home defeats in all matches.

== Participants ==
=== Location of participants ===
In the 2025 season, 30 teams participated in the first league. The communities are divided into Western, Eastern, and Central regions.

Location of teams of the First League of Uzbekistan for football 2025 by region.
Red: western region; Yellow: central region; Blue: Eastern region
Uzbekistan First League 2025, location of Tashkent teams by location.
Red: western region; Yellow: central region; Blue: Eastern region

=== Western region ===
Club	City (district)	Province (region)	Stadium	Coach
BuxDU	Bukhara	Bukhara	Bukhara FA	
Lochin	Beshkent	Qashqadaryo	Beshkent	
Kumkurgan-1977	Kumkurgan	Surxondaryo	Alpomish	
Aral akademiya	Nukus	Karakalpakstan	Nukus BOʻFA	
Kattaqoʻrgʻon	Kattakurgan	Samarqand	Dinamo	
Qiziriq	Qiziriq	Surxondaryo	Alpomish	
Xorazm FA	Urganch	Xorazm	Xorazm sports complex	
Buxoro FA	Buxoro	Buxoro	Buxoro FA	
Nasaf Farm	Qarshi	Qashqadaryo	Central	
Navoi FA	Navoiy	Navoiy	Navbahor	

=== Eastern region ===
Club	City (district)	Province (Territory)	Stadium
OKMK Semurg'	Olmaliq	Tashkent Region	OKMK sports complex
Dustlik	Tashkent	Tashkent	Lokomotiv
Andijon FA	Andijan	Andijan Region	Bobur
Lokomotiv BFK	Tashkent	Tashkent	Lokomotiv
Bagdad	Baghdad	Fergana Region	Neftchi
Sementchi	Kuvasoy	Fergana Region	Cementchi
Paxtakor Farm	Tashkent	Tashkent	Pakhtakor
Navbahor Farm	Namangan	Namangan	Navbahor
Fargona FA	Fergana	Fergana Region	Istiqlol
Namangan FA	Namangan	Namangan Region	Navbahor

=== Central Region ===
Club	City	Region (Province)	Stadium
Chigʻatoy	Tashkent	Tashkent	Chigʻatoy
Zamin	Zomin District	Jizzakh Region	Zomin
Bunyodkor Farm	Tashkent	Tashkent	Bunyodkor
Oqtepa	Chilanzar District	Tashkent	Odil Ahmedov Academy
Tashkent VFA	Qibray District	Tashkent Region	Dustlik Stadium
Ishtikhon	Ishtikhon	Samarkand Region	Dinamo
Ahmedov FK	Tashkent	Tashkent	Odil Ahmedov
Lokomotiv Farm	Tashkent	Tashkent	Lokomotiv
Sirdaryo FA	Guliston	Sirdaryo Region	Yangiyer
Jizzakh FA	Jizzakh	Jizzakh Region	Jizzakh FA

== Results table ==
=== Western Region ===
Pos	Team	Pld	W	D	L	GF	GA	GD	Pts
1	Lochin	9	7	1	1	30	7	+23	22
2	BuxDU	8	7	1	0	23	5	+18	22
3	Kattakurgan	8	5	2	1	14	6	+8	17
4	Xorazm FA	9	5	1	3	14	9	+5	16
5	Aral akademiya	8	3	3	2	6	9	−3	12
6	Navoiy FA	8	2	1	5	8	18	−10	7
7	Qiziriq	9	1	3	5	6	14	−8	6
8	Kumkurgan-1977	8	2	0	6	8	19	−11	6
9	Nasaf Farm	8	1	2	5	4	15	−11	5
10	Buxoro FA	9	1	2	6	9	20	−11	5

Updated to match(es) played on December 1, 2025. Source: Uzbekistan Professional Football League
Rules for classification: 1) Points; 2) Head-to-head points; 3) Head-to-head goal difference; 4) Head-to-head goal difference; 5) Goal difference; 6) Goals scored;

=== Sharqiy mintaqa ===
Pos	Team	Pld	W	D	L	GF	GA	GD	Pts
1	Sementchi	9	7	1	1	23	13	+10	22
2	Doʻstlik	9	6	1	2	25	14	+11	19
3	Andijon FA	9	5	1	3	20	14	+6	16
4	OKMK Semurgʻ	9	4	2	3	22	16	+6	14
5	Paxtakor Farm	9	4	1	4	10	15	−5	13
6	Lokomotiv BFK	9	3	3	3	13	16	−3	12
7	Namangan FA	9	3	1	5	13	14	−1	10
8	Bogʻdod	8	2	3	3	17	19	−2	9
9	Navbahor Farm	9	3	0	6	11	15	−4	9
10	Fargʻona FA	8	0	1	7	6	24	−18	1

Updated to match(es) played on December 1, 2025. Source: Oʻzbekiston Professional Futbol Ligasi
Rules for classification: 1) Points; 2) Head-to-head points; 3) Head-to-head goal difference; 4) Head-to-head goal difference; 5) Goal difference; 6) Goals scored;

=== Central region ===
Pos	Team	Pld	W	D	L	GF	GA	GD	Pts
1	Zamin	8	6	2	0	22	8	+14	20
2	Chigʻatoy	9	6	2	1	22	10	+12	20
3	Ishtixon	9	6	0	3	26	19	+7	18
4	Bunyodkor farm	9	4	4	1	19	12	+7	16
5	Sirdaryo FA	8	3	2	3	12	12	0	11
6	Lokomotiv Farm	9	2	3	4	11	14	−3	9
7	Oqtepa	8	2	2	4	13	14	−1	8
8	Toshkent VFA	9	2	2	5	5	18	−13	8
9	Ahmedov FK	8	2	1	5	10	16	−6	7
10	Jizzax FA	9	0	2	7	9	26	−17	2

Updated to match(es) played on December 1, 2025. Source: Uzbekistan Professional Football League
Rules for classification: 1) Points; 2) Head-to-head points; 3) Head-to-head goal difference; 4) Head-to-head goal difference; 5) Goal difference; 6) Goals scored;

== Table of tournament ==
Time (UZT)	Match	Result	Stadium	Attendance	Source
11.04.2025, 16:00	Chigʻatoy – Oqtepa	2 : 1	Chigʻatoy	162	
11.04.2025, 16:30	Sementchi – Ferghana FA	1 : 1	Sementchi	325	
11.04.2025, 17:00	Kumkurgan-1977 – Bukhara FA	2 : 1	Alpomish	1200	
11.04.2025, 17:00	Khorezm FA – Qiziriq	1 : 1	Khorezm SM	312	
12.04.2025, 16:00	Pakhtakor Farm – OKMK Semurgʻ	0 : 4	Qibray	98	
12.04.2025, 16:00	Sirdaryo FA – Ishtikhan	1 : 3	Yangiyer	245	
12.04.2025, 16:30	Lochin – Nasaf Farm	2 : 0	Beshkent Central	251	
12.04.2025, 16:45	Ahmedov FK – Tashkent VFA	0 : 1	Odil Ahmedov Academy	105	
13.04.2025, 16:00	Baghdad – Navbahor Farm	2 : 1	–	1209	
13.04.2025, 16:00	Namangan FA – Dustlik	0 : 3	Yosh kuch	196	
13.04.2025, 16:00	Andijon FA – Lokomotiv BFK	4 : 1	Andijon BOʻFM	89	
14.04.2025, 16:00	Bunyodkor Farm – Zamin	1 : 1	Bunyodkor Academy	117	
14.04.2025, 16:00	Jizzakh FA – Lokomotiv Farm	0 : 0	Odil Ahmedov Academy	82	
14.04.2025, 16:00	BukhDU – Aral akademiya	3 : 0	Bukhara FA	69	
14.04.2025, 16:00	Navoi FA – Kattakurgan	0 : 3	Yoshlik	268	
18.04.2025, 16:00	Tashkent VFA – Zamin	0 : 5	Tashkent Regional FA	85	
18.04.2025, 16:00	OKMK Semurgʻ – Andijon FA	2 : 0	–	6278	
18.04.2025, 16:00	Ferghana FA – Navbahor Farm	1 : 3	–	112	
18.04.2025, 16:00	Lokomotiv Farm – Sirdaryo FA	0 : 0	Odil Ahmedov Academy	33	
18.04.2025, 16:30	BukhDU – Navoi FA	1 : 0	Bukhara FA	35	
19.04.2025, 16:00	Qiziriq – Kumkurgan-1977	1 : 0	Alpomish	520	
19.04.2025, 16:30	Aral akademiya – Bukhara FA	1 : 0	BOʻFA Nukus	133	
19.04.2025, 16:30	Ahmedov FK – Chigʻatoy	0 : 1	–	68	
19.04.2025, 17:30	Lokomotiv BFK – Namangan FA	2 : 1	Tashkent Regional FA	89	
20.04.2025, 16:00	Ishtikhan – Bunyodkor Farm	0 : 1	Samarqand Football School	2000	
20.04.2025, 17:00	Oqtepa – Jizzakh FA	5 : 0	–	42	
21.04.2025, 16:00	Kattakurgan – Lochin	1 : 3	–	2500	
21.04.2025, 16:00	Sementchi – Pakhtakor Farm	3 : 2	Sementchi	145	
21.04.2025, 16:00	Nasaf Farm – Khorezm FA	0 : 1	Mehnatchi	78	
21.04.2025, 17:00	Dustlik – Baghdad	4 : 3	NOPSTTM	103	
25.04.2025, 16:15	Khorezm FA – Kattakurgan	1 : 2	Khorezm SM	216	
25.04.2025, 17:00	Chigʻatoy – Tashkent VFA	6 : 2	Chigʻatoy	213	
25.04.2025, 16:15	Bukhara FA – Qiziriq	0 : 0	–	0	
25.04.2025, 17:15	Navbahor Farm – Dustlik	1 : 2	Yosh kuch	105	
25.04.2025, 17:00	Jizzakh FA – Ahmedov FK	1 : 2	ROPSTTM	169	
25.04.2025, 17:00	Lochin – BukhDU	2 : 2	Beshkent Central	235	
26.04.2025, 16:30	Bunyodkor Farm – Lokomotiv Farm	1 : 1	Bunyodkor Academy	52	
26.04.2025, 16:30	Sirdaryo FA – Oqtepa	1 : 1	Yangiyer	251	
26.04.2025, 16:30	Andijon FA – Sementchi	3 : 2	Andijon FA	73	
26.04.2025, 16:45	Zamin – Ishtikhan	3 : 2	Odil Ahmedov Academy	77	
26.04.2025, 17:00	Pakhtakor Farm – Ferghana FA	2 : 1	Qibray	38	
27.04.2025, 17:00	Baghdad – Lokomotiv BFK	2 : 2	–	753	
27.04.2025, 17:00	Kumkurgan-1977 – Nasaf Farm	0 : 0	Alpomish arena	437	
28.04.2025, 17:30	Navoi FA – Aral akademiya	0 : 2	Yoshlik	83	
29.04.2025, 16:30	Namangan FA – OKMK Semurgʻ	2 : 3			
05.05.2025, 16:30	BukhDU – Khorezm FA	2 : 0			
05.05.2025, 17:00	Pakhtakor Farm – Andijon FA	0 : 0			
05.05.2025, 17:00	Nasaf Farm – Bukhara FA	2 : 2			
05.05.2025, 17:00	Aral akademiya – Qiziriq	0 : 0			
05.05.2025, 17:00	Kattakurgan – Kumkurgan-1977	1 : 0			
06.05.2025, 17:00	Ferghana FA – Dustlik	1 : 4			
06.05.2025, 17:00	Oqtepa – Bunyodkor Farm	1 : 2			
06.05.2025, 17:00	Navoi FA – Lochin	1 : 5			
06.05.2025, 17:00	OKMK Semurgʻ – Baghdad	1 : 1			
06.05.2025, 17:00	Ahmedov FK – Sirdaryo FA	2 : 1			
07.05.2025, 17:00	Lokomotiv BFK – Navbahor Farm	1 : 0			
07.05.2025, 17:00	Lokomotiv Farm – Zamin	2 : 3			
07.05.2025, 17:00	Tashkent VFA – Ishtikhan	1 : 3			
07.05.2025, 17:00	Sementchi – Namangan FA	1 : 0			
08.05.2025, 17:30	Chigʻatoy – Jizzakh FA	3 : 0			
15.05.2025, 17:00	Namangan FA – Pakhtakor Farm	0 : 1			
15.05.2025, 17:00	Sirdaryo FA – Chigʻatoy	2 : 1			
15.05.2025, 17:15	Bunyodkor Farm – Ahmedov FK	2 : 2			
15.05.2025, 17:30	Baghdad – Sementchi	3 : 5			
15.05.2025, 18:00	Kumkurgan-1977 – BukhDU	2 : 6			
16.05.2025, 17:00	Khorezm FA – Navoi FA	3 : 1			
16.05.2025, 17:15	Jizzakh FA – Tashkent VFA	0 : 0			
16.05.2025, 17:45	Bukhara FA – Kattakurgan	1 : 3			
16.05.2025, 18:30	Navbahor Farm – OKMK Semurgʻ	2 : 1			
17.05.2025, 17:30	Dustlik – Lokomotiv BFK	2 : 2			
17.05.2025, 18:00	Andijon FA – Ferghana FA	5 : 0			
18.05.2025, 17:30	Zamin – Oqtepa	4 : 1			
18.05.2025, 17:30	Qiziriq – Nasaf Farm	1 : 2			
19.05.2025, 17:30	Ishtikhan – Lokomotiv Farm	4 : 2			
19.05.2025, 17:30	Lochin – Aral akademiya	4 : 0			
30.05.2025, 17:30	Lochin – Khorezm FA	1 : 2			
31.05.2025, 17:00	Pakhtakor Farm – Baghdad	3 : 4			
31.05.2025, 17:30	Chigʻatoy – Bunyodkor Farm	2 : 2			
31.05.2025, 17:30	Ferghana FA – Lokomotiv BFK	1 : 2			
31.05.2025, 17:30	Andijon FA – Namangan FA	1 : 3			
31.05.2025, 17:45	BukhDU – Bukhara FA	4 : 1			
31.05.2025, 18:00	Tashkent VFA – Lokomotiv Farm	0 : 1			
01.06.2025, 17:00	Oqtepa – Ishtikhan	2 : 5	Oqtepa	23	
01.06.2025, 17:30	Jizzakh FA – Sirdaryo FA	2 : 4	Soʻgʻdiyona	69	
01.06.2025, 17:30	Navoi FA – Kumkurgan-1977	2 : 1	Yoshlik	58	
01.06.2025, 17:30	Kattakurgan – Qiziriq	0 : 0	Kattakurgan Central	2000	
01.06.2025, 17:30	Sementchi – Navbahor Farm	3 : 0	Sementchi	82	
01.06.2025, 18:00	Aral akademiya – Nasaf Farm	0 : 0	BOʻFA Nukus	182	
01.06.2025, 18:00	OKMK Semurgʻ – Dustlik	2 : 4	Metallurg	583	
25.06.2025, 00:00	Ahmedov FK – Zamin	1 : 4	?	70	
08.06.2025, 18:00	Bunyodkor Farm – Jizzakh FA	5 : 2	Bunyodkor Academy	30	
13.06.2025, 00:00	Dustlik – Sementchi	1 : 2	Odil Ahmedov Academy	67	
13.06.2025, 18:00	Qiziriq – BukhDU	0 : 2	Qiziriq	115	
14.06.2025, 17:30	Ishtikhan – Ahmedov FK	3 : 2	Ishtikhan Central	451	
14.06.2025, 17:30	Lokomotiv BFK – OKMK Semurgʻ	3 : 3	TFA	133	
14.06.2025, 17:45	Lokomotiv Farm – Oqtepa	0 : 2	Odil Ahmedov Academy	127	
14.06.2025, 18:00	Kumkurgan-1977 – Lochin	0 : 4	Alpomish arena	252	
14.06.2025, 18:00	Navbahor Farm – Pakhtakor Farm	0 : 1	Central	301	
14.06.2025, 18:00	Nasaf Farm – Kattakurgan	0 : 3	Mehnatchi	257	
14.06.2025, 18:30	Khorezm FA – Aral akademiya	1 : 2	Khorezm SM	312	
15.06.2025, 17:30	Sirdaryo FA – Tashkent VFA	0 : 1	Yangiyer	102	
15.06.2025, 17:30	Baghdad – Andijon FA	1 : 2	Baghdad Central	687	
15.06.2025, 17:45	Namangan FA – Ferghana FA	4 : 1	Yosh kuch	43	
15.06.2025, 18:00	Zamin – Chigʻatoy	0 : 0	Odil Ahmedov Academy	52	
15.06.2025, 18:00	Bukhara FA – Navoi FA	1 : 1	Bukhara FA	55	
20.06.2025, 17:45	Namangan FA – Baghdad	1 : 1	Yosh kuch	156	
20.06.2025, 18:00	Sementchi – Lokomotiv BFK	2 : 0	Sementchi	250	
21.06.2025, 00:00	Tashkent VFA – Oqtepa	0 : 0	Tashkent Regional FA	T.m.	
21.06.2025, 18:00	Pakhtakor Farm – Dustlik	0 : 3	Qibray	112	
21.06.2025, 18:00	Jizzakh FA – Zamin	1 : 2	Soʻgʻdiyona qarorgohi	74	
21.06.2025, 18:00	Navoi FA – Qiziriq	3 : 2	Yoshlik	233	
21.06.2025, 18:00	Lochin – Bukhara FA	6 : 0	Beshkent Central	125	
21.06.2025, 18:00	Chigʻatoy – Ishtikhan	4 : 1	Chigʻatoy	32	
21.06.2025, 18:30	Khorezm FA – Kumkurgan-1977	4 : 0	Khorezm SM	71	
22.06.2025, 17:30	Ferghana FA – OKMK Semurgʻ	0 : 3	Sementchi	52	
22.06.2025, 17:30	Sirdaryo FA – Bunyodkor Farm	3 : 2	Yangiyer	106	
22.06.2025, 17:45	Ahmedov FK – Lokomotiv Farm	1 : 3	ROPSTTM	35	
22.06.2025, 18:00	Andijon FA – Navbahor Farm	2 : 3	Andijon FA	68	
22.06.2025, 18:00	BukhDU – Nasaf Farm	3 : 0	Bukhara FA	169	
22.06.2025, 18:30	Aral akademiya – Kattakurgan	1 : 1	BOʻFA Nukus	67	
27.06.2025, 00:00	Lokomotiv Farm – Chigʻatoy	2 : 3	Odil Ahmedov Academy	68	
27.06.2025, 18:30	Navbahor Farm – Namangan FA	1 : 2	Central. Zaxira	317	
28.06.2025, 00:00	Ishtikhan – Jizzakh FA	5 : 3	Ishtikhan Central	700	
28.06.2025, 00:00	Bukhara FA – Khorezm FA	0 : 1	Bukhara FA	48	
28.06.2025, 18:00	OKMK Semurgʻ – Sementchi	3 : 4	Kimyogar	1017	
28.06.2025, 18:00	Bunyodkor Farm – Tashkent VFA	3 : 0	Bunyodkor Academy	78	
28.06.2025, 18:00	Lokomotiv BFK – Pakhtakor Farm	0 : 1	TFA	147	
28.06.2025, 18:00	Dustlik – Andijon FA	2 : 3	Odil Ahmedov Academy	62	
28.06.2025, 18:00	Qiziriq – Lochin	1 : 3	Qiziriq	152	
29.06.2025, 00:00	Kumkurgan-1977 – Aral akademiya	1 : 1	Alpomish	251	
29.06.2025, 00:00	Nasaf Farm – Navoi FA	7 : 1	Mehnatchi	88	
29.06.2025, 00:00	Zamin – Sirdaryo FA	2 : 0	Odil Ahmedov Academy	74	
29.06.2025, 18:00	Kattakurgan – BukhDU	3 : 1	Kattakurgan Central	1200	
29.06.2025, 18:00	Baghdad – Ferghana FA	1 : 2	Baghdad Central	3365	
03.08.2025, 17:45	Oqtepa – Ahmedov FK	3 : 2	Oqtepa	134	
09.08.2025, 17:30	Lokomotiv BFK – Andijon FA	1 : 1	TFA	217	
09.08.2025, 17:30	Nasaf Farm – Lochin	0 : 5	Mehnatchi	187	
09.08.2025, 17:30	Kattakurgan – Navoi FA	2 : 1	Kattakurgan Central	1217	
09.08.2025, 17:30	Lokomotiv Farm – Jizzakh FA	1 : 2	Chigʻatoy	217	
09.08.2025, 17:30	Ferghana FA – Sementchi	0 : 11	?	0	
09.08.2025, 17:45	Oqtepa – Chigʻatoy	2 : 2	Oqtepa	129	
09.08.2025, 18:00	Bukhara FA – Kumkurgan-1977	2 : 2	Bukhara FA	58	
09.08.2025, 18:30	Dustlik – Namangan FA	2 : 1	Odil Ahmedov Academy	87	
09.08.2025, 19:00	Tashkent VFA – Ahmedov FK	0 : 4	Tashkent Regional FA	34	
10.08.2025, 17:30	Ishtikhan – Sirdaryo FA	1 : 1	Ishtikhan Central	517	
10.08.2025, 17:30	Navbahor Farm – Baghdad	1 : 2	?	212	
10.08.2025, 17:45	Qiziriq – Khorezm FA	2 : 2	Qiziriq	124	
10.08.2025, 17:45	Aral akademiya – BukhDU	1 : 3	BOʻFA Nukus	218	
10.08.2025, 18:00	Zamin – Bunyodkor Farm	3 : 1	Odil Ahmedov Academy	43	
10.08.2025, 18:00	OKMK Semurgʻ – Pakhtakor Farm	1 : 2	Kimyogar	4521	
15.08.2025, 17:30	Lochin – Kattakurgan	2 : 3	Beshkent Central	147	
15.08.2025, 17:30	Navbahor Farm – Ferghana FA	3 : 2	Central. Zaxira	83	
16.08.2025, 17:00	Jizzakh FA – Oqtepa	2 : 0	Soʻgʻdiyona qarorgohi	47	
16.08.2025, 17:00	Bunyodkor Farm – Ishtikhan	4 : 0	Bunyodkor Academy	45	
16.08.2025, 17:00	Baghdad – Dustlik	3 : 2	Baghdad Central	473	
16.08.2025, 17:30	Andijon FA – OKMK Semurgʻ	1 : 0	Andijon FA	58	
16.08.2025, 17:45	Zamin – Tashkent VFA	7 : 2	Odil Ahmedov Academy	35	
16.08.2025, 17:45	Bukhara FA – Aral akademiya	0 : 2	Bukhara FA	86	
17.08.2025, 17:00	Sirdaryo FA – Lokomotiv Farm	3 : 1	Yangiyer	91	
17.08.2025, 17:30	Kumkurgan-1977 – Qiziriq	0 : 1	Alpomish arena	127	
17.08.2025, 17:30	Navoi FA – BukhDU	0 : 3	Yoshlik	60	
17.08.2025, 17:45	Khorezm FA – Nasaf Farm	1 : 0	Xiva SM	152	
17.08.2025, 17:45	Pakhtakor Farm – Sementchi	2 : 3	Qibray	52	
18.08.2025, 17:00	Namangan FA – Lokomotiv BFK	2 : 3	?	0	
28.08.2025, 17:00	Chigʻatoy – Ahmedov FK	3 : 2	Chigʻatoy	145	
06.09.2025, 16:00	Dustlik – Ferghana FA	7 : 0	Dustlik	147	
06.09.2025, 16:00	Sirdaryo FA – Ahmedov FK	1 : 0	Yangiyer	0	
06.09.2025, 16:00	Navbahor Farm – Lokomotiv BFK	6 : 3	Central. Zaxira	0	
06.09.2025, 16:45	Andijon FA – Pakhtakor Farm	1 : 2	Andijon FA	0	
06.09.2025, 17:00	Bunyodkor Farm – Oqtepa	2 : 2	Bunyodkor Academy	0	
06.09.2025, 17:00	Lochin – Navoi FA	4 : 1	Mehnatchi	187	
06.09.2025, 17:00	Ishtikhan – Tashkent VFA	3 : 0	–	110	
06.09.2025, 17:00	Qiziriq – Aral akademiya	2 : 1	Qiziriq	57	
07.09.2025, 16:00	Khorezm FA – BukhDU	1 : 1	Xiva SM	364	
07.09.2025, 16:00	Jizzakh FA – Chigʻatoy	0 : 1	Soʻgʻdiyona	89	
07.09.2025, 16:30	Namangan FA – Sementchi	1 : 0	Yosh kuch	90	
07.09.2025, 16:30	Zamin – Lokomotiv Farm	3 : 1	Odil Ahmedov Academy	47	
07.09.2025, 16:45	Baghdad – OKMK Semurgʻ	4 : 4	–	440	
07.09.2025, 17:00	Bukhara FA – Nasaf Farm	2 : 2	Bukhara FA	30	
07.09.2025, 17:15	Kumkurgan-1977 – Kattakurgan	0 : 4	Alpomish	76	
12.09.2025, 17:00	Pakhtakor Farm – Namangan FA	0 : 1	Qibray	0	
13.09.2025, 16:30	Ferghana FA – Andijon FA	1 : 4	Sementchi	50	
13.09.2025, 16:30	Ahmedov FK – Bunyodkor Farm	1 : 1	–	23	
13.09.2025, 16:30	Chigʻatoy – Sirdaryo FA	4 : 2	Chigʻatoy	125	
13.09.2025, 16:30	Lokomotiv Farm – Ishtikhan	3 : 0	Odil Ahmedov Academy	77	
13.09.2025, 16:30	Navoi FA – Khorezm FA	0 : 3	Yoshlik	t.m.	
13.09.2025, 16:45	BukhDU – Kumkurgan-1977	6 : 0	Bukhara FA	45	
13.09.2025, 17:00	Lokomotiv BFK – Dustlik	2 : 2	TFA	33	
13.09.2025, 17:00	Aral akademiya – Lochin	0 : 3	BOʻFA Nukus	73	
14.09.2025, 16:00	Sementchi – Baghdad	1 : 0	Sementchi	0	
14.09.2025, 16:30	OKMK Semurgʻ – Navbahor Farm	2 : 2	Kimyogar	555	
14.09.2025, 16:30	Tashkent VFA – Jizzakh FA	1 : 2	TFA	0	
14.09.2025, 16:45	Kattakurgan – Bukhara FA	4 : 0	Kattakurgan Central	0	
14.09.2025, 17:00	Nasaf Farm – Qiziriq	2 : 4	Central (Qarshi)	245	
04.10.2025, 16:00	Oqtepa – Zamin	5 : 1	–	32	
19.09.2025, 16:00	Khorezm FA – Lochin	3 : 0	Xiva SM	121	
20.09.2025, 16:00	Namangan FA – Andijon FA	2 : 1	Yosh kuch	53	
20.09.2025, 16:30	Lokomotiv Farm – Tashkent VFA	5 : 1	Odil Ahmedov Academy	113	
20.09.2025, 16:30	Qiziriq – Kattakurgan	4 : 3	Qiziriq	215	
20.09.2025, 16:30	Nasaf Farm – Aral akademiya	4 : 2	–	47	
20.09.2025, 16:30	Lokomotiv BFK – Ferghana FA	5 : 0	–	17	
21.09.2025, 16:00	Dustlik – OKMK Semurgʻ	4 : 2	Odil Ahmedov Academy	75	
21.09.2025, 16:00	Sirdaryo FA – Jizzakh FA	3 : 0	Yangiyer	14	
21.09.2025, 16:00	Ishtikhan – Oqtepa	1 : 1	Ishtikhan Central	120	
21.09.2025, 16:30	Kumkurgan-1977 – Navoi FA	1 : 4	Alpomish	105	
21.09.2025, 16:30	Bunyodkor Farm – Chigʻatoy	1 : 1	Bunyodkor Academy	58	
22.09.2025, 15:00	Bukhara FA – BukhDU	0 : 2	Bukhara FA	30	
22.09.2025, 15:00	Navbahor Farm – Sementchi	0 : 4	Sementchi	47	
22.09.2025, 16:00	Baghdad – Pakhtakor Farm	0 : 0	–	350	
16.10.2025, 15:30	Zamin – Ahmedov FK	4 : 0	Odil Ahmedov Academy	11	
27.09.2025, 14:30	Jizzakh FA – Bunyodkor Farm	2 : 2	Soʻgʻdiyona qarorgohi	31	
27.09.2025, 15:00	Sementchi – Dustlik	5 : 1	Sementchi	32	
27.09.2025, 16:00	Ahmedov FK – Ishtikhan	0 : 0	Odil Ahmedov Academy	128	
27.09.2025, 16:00	BukhDU – Qiziriq	1 : 3	Bukhara FA	25	
27.09.2025, 16:00	Tashkent VFA – Sirdaryo FA	0 : 1	Tashkent Regional FA	101	
27.09.2025, 16:00	Lochin – Kumkurgan-1977	1 : 0	Beshkent Central	101	
28.09.2025, 15:00	Ferghana FA – Namangan FA	0 : 3	Sementchi	19	
28.09.2025, 16:00	Oqtepa – Lokomotiv Farm	3 : 1	Oqtepa	96	
28.09.2025, 16:00	Kattakurgan – Nasaf Farm	1 : 1	Kattakurgan Central	1956	
28.09.2025, 16:00	Pakhtakor Farm – Navbahor Farm	3 : 1	Qibray	67	
28.09.2025, 16:00	Aral akademiya – Khorezm FA	1 : 2	BOʻFA Nukus	218	
28.09.2025, 16:00	Chigʻatoy – Zamin	0 : 4	Chigʻatoy	68	
28.09.2025, 16:00	OKMK Semurgʻ – Lokomotiv BFK	1 : 1	Kimyogar	682	
28.09.2025, 16:00	Navoi FA – Bukhara FA	2 : 2	Bukhara FA	25	
28.09.2025, 16:00	Andijon FA – Baghdad	3 : 3	Andijon BOʻFM	78	
11.10.2025, 14:00	Lokomotiv BFK – Sementchi	1 : 2	–	t.m.	
11.10.2025, 15:00	Ishtikhan – Chigʻatoy	2 : 1	Ishtikhan Central	150	
11.10.2025, 15:30	Oqtepa – Tashkent VFA	5 : 0	Oqtepa	42	
11.10.2025, 15:30	Bukhara FA – Lochin	0 : 4	Bukhara FA	40	
11.10.2025, 15:30	Zamin – Jizzakh FA	7 : 0	Odil Ahmedov Academy	24	
11.10.2025, 15:30	Qiziriq – Navoi FA	3 : 1	Qiziriq	68	
11.10.2025, 16:00	Nasaf Farm – BukhDU	0 : 0	Central (Qarshi)	158	
12.10.2025, 15:00	Navbahor Farm – Andijon FA	0 : 1	Central. Zaxira	65	
12.10.2025, 15:00	Dustlik – Pakhtakor Farm	0 : 3	Odil Ahmedov Academy	177	
12.10.2025, 15:00	OKMK Semurgʻ – Ferghana FA	1 : 2	Kimyogar	268	
12.10.2025, 15:00	Baghdad – Namangan FA	0 : 2	–	200	
12.10.2025, 15:30	Kattakurgan – Aral akademiya	5 : 0	–	900	
12.10.2025, 15:30	Kumkurgan-1977 – Khorezm FA	1 : 4	Alpomish	74	
12.10.2025, 16:00	Bunyodkor Farm – Sirdaryo FA	3 : 2	Bunyodkor Academy	35	
13.10.2025, 15:00	Lokomotiv Farm – Ahmedov FK	5 : 0	Odil Ahmedov Academy	42	
18.10.2025, 15:00	Aral akademiya – Kumkurgan-1977	3 : 0	T.m.	0	
18.10.2025, 15:00	Khorezm FA – Bukhara FA	5 : 1	Xiva SM	31	
18.10.2025, 15:00	Navoi FA – Nasaf Farm	3 : 2	Yoshlik	73	
18.10.2025, 15:00	BukhDU – Kattakurgan	1 : 1	Umid	160	
18.10.2025, 15:00	Lochin – Qiziriq	1 : 1	Beshkent Central	150	
19.10.2025, 15:00	Ahmedov FK – Oqtepa	0 : 2	Odil Ahmedov Academy	101	
19.10.2025, 15:00	Sirdaryo FA – Zomin	1 : 1	Yangiyer	237	
19.10.2025, 15:00	Tashkent VFA – Bunyodkor Farm	0 : 1	TFA	77	
19.10.2025, 15:00	Jizzakh FA – Ishtikhan	0 : 3	Soʻgʻdiyona	23	
19.10.2025, 15:00	Chigʻatoy – Lokomotiv Farm	1 : 4	Chigʻatoy	0	
21.10.2025, 15:00	Andijon FA – Dustlik	2 : 1	Andijon FA	58	
21.10.2025, 15:00	Namangan FA – Navbahor Farm	4 : 1	Yosh kuch	75	
21.10.2025, 15:00	Pakhtakor Farm – Lokomotiv BFK	3 : 2	Qibray	29	
21.10.2025, 15:00	Ferghana FA – Baghdad	0 : 2	?	150	
21.10.2025, 15:00	Sementchi – OKMK Semurgʻ	4 : 1	Sementchi	56	
04.11.2025, 11:00	Lochin – Oqtepa	4 : 0	Odil Ahmedov Academy	65	
04.11.2025, 14:30	Sementchi – Khorezm FA	2 : 1	Odil Ahmedov Academy	144	
05.11.2025, 11:00	Kattakurgan – Bunyodkor Farm	0 : 0	Odil Ahmedov Academy	177	
05.11.2025, 14:30	BukhDU – Namangan FA	3 : 2	Odil Ahmedov Academy	117	
06.11.2025, 11:00	Pakhtakor Farm – Qiziriq	0 : 1	Odil Ahmedov Academy	71	
06.11.2025, 14:30	Chigʻatoy – Ishtikhan	6 : 0	Odil Ahmedov Academy	167	
07.11.2025, 11:00	Zamin – Cosmos	6 : 0	Odil Ahmedov Academy	261	
07.11.2025, 14:30	Dustlik – Andijon FA	4 : 1	Odil Ahmedov Academy	117	
23.11.2025, 14:30	Chigʻatoy – BukhDU	1 : 3	Odil Ahmedov Academy	0	
23.11.2025, 11:30	Sementchi – Zomin	2 : 7	Odil Ahmedov Academy	35	
24.11.2025, 14:30	Lochin – Kattakurgan	0 : 1	Odil Ahmedov Academy	396	
24.11.2025, 11:30	Qiziriq – Dustlik	1 : 3	Odil Ahmedov Academy	71	
26.11.2025, 14:30	Zamin – Kattakurgan	4 : 1	Odil Ahmedov Academy	117	
26.11.2025, 11:30	Dustlik – BukhDU	4 : 1	Odil Ahmedov Academy	117	
28.11.2025, 14:30	Kattakurgan – Dustlik	1 : 2	Odil Ahmedov Academy	117	
28.11.2025, 11:30	Zamin – BukhDU	3 : 0	Odil Ahmedov Academy	117	

== Goals ==
=== By club ===
Pos.	Club	Goals
1	OKMK Semurgʻ	9
2	Dustlik Tashkent	9
3	Chigʻatoy	9
4	Zamin	8
5	Andijon FA	7
6	Bogʻdod	7
7	Oqtepa	7
8	Lochin	7
9	Kattakurgan	6
10	Sementchi	6

=== By player ===
22 goals

- (Uzbekistan) Abduvohid Oxtayev (Zomin)

19 goals

- (Uzbekistan) Saidmurod Karimov (Dustlik)

16 goals

- (Uzbekistan) Sayyodbek Davronov (Kattakurgan)

14 goals

- (Uzbekistan) Nikolas Akopov (Lokomotiv)

10 goals

- (Uzbekistan) Javohir Alijonov (Dustlik)
