= Boris Lavrov =

Russian footballer

Personal information
- Full name: Boris Valentinovich Lavrov
- Date of birth: June 15, 1950 (age 76)
- Place of birth: Tashkent, Uzbek SSR, Soviet Union

Managerial career
- Years: Team
- 1990: FC Shakhtyor Angren
- 1990–1991: FC Zarafshan Navoi
- 1991: FC Konchi Angren (assistant)
- 1994–1995: FC Nosta Novotroitsk (assistant)
- 1996–1997: Köpetdag FK
- 1997–1998: FC UralAZ Miass (assistant)
- 1999: FC Nosta Novotroitsk (caretaker)
- 2000: FC Nosta Novotroitsk (assistant)
- 2001: FC Metallurg-Zapsib Novokuznetsk
- 2002–2004: FC Zvezda Irkutsk
- 2005–2006: FC Sibiryak Bratsk
- 2007–2009: FC Amur Blagoveshchensk
- 2010: FC Chelyabinsk

Boris Valentinovich Lavrov (Russian: Борис Валентинович Лавров; born June 15, 1950) is a Russian-Uzbekistani football coach. He was also a former player, appearing for Stoitel Ashkhabad in 1969.
