= 1969 =

1969 in various calendars
- Gregorian calendar: 1969; MCMLXIX
- Ab urbe condita: 2722
- Armenian calendar: 1418; ԹՎ ՌՆԺԸ
- Assyrian calendar: 6719
- Baháʼí calendar: 125–126
- Balinese saka calendar: 1890–1891
- Bengali calendar: 1375–1376
- Berber calendar: 2919
- British Regnal year: 17 Eliz. 2 – 18 Eliz. 2
- Buddhist calendar: 2513
- Burmese calendar: 1331
- Byzantine calendar: 7477–7478
- Chinese calendar: 戊申年 (Earth Monkey); 4666 or 4459 — to — 己酉年 (Earth Rooster); 4667 or 4460
- Coptic calendar: 1685–1686
- Discordian calendar: 3135
- Ethiopian calendar: 1961–1962
- Hebrew calendar: 5729–5730
- Hindu calendars
- Vikram Samvat: 2025–2026
- Shaka Samvat: 1890–1891
- Kali Yuga: 5069–5070
- Holocene calendar: 11969
- Igbo calendar: 969–970
- Iranian calendar: 1347–1348
- Islamic calendar: 1388–1389
- Japanese calendar: Shōwa 44 (昭和４４年)
- Javanese calendar: 1900–1901
- Juche calendar: 58
- Julian calendar: Gregorian minus 13 days
- Korean calendar: 4302
- Minguo calendar: ROC 58 民國58年
- Nanakshahi calendar: 501
- Thai solar calendar: 2512
- Tibetan calendar: ས་ཕོ་སྤྲེ་ལོ་ (male Earth-Monkey); 2095 or 1714 or 942 — to — ས་མོ་བྱ་ལོ་ (female Earth-Bird); 2096 or 1715 or 943

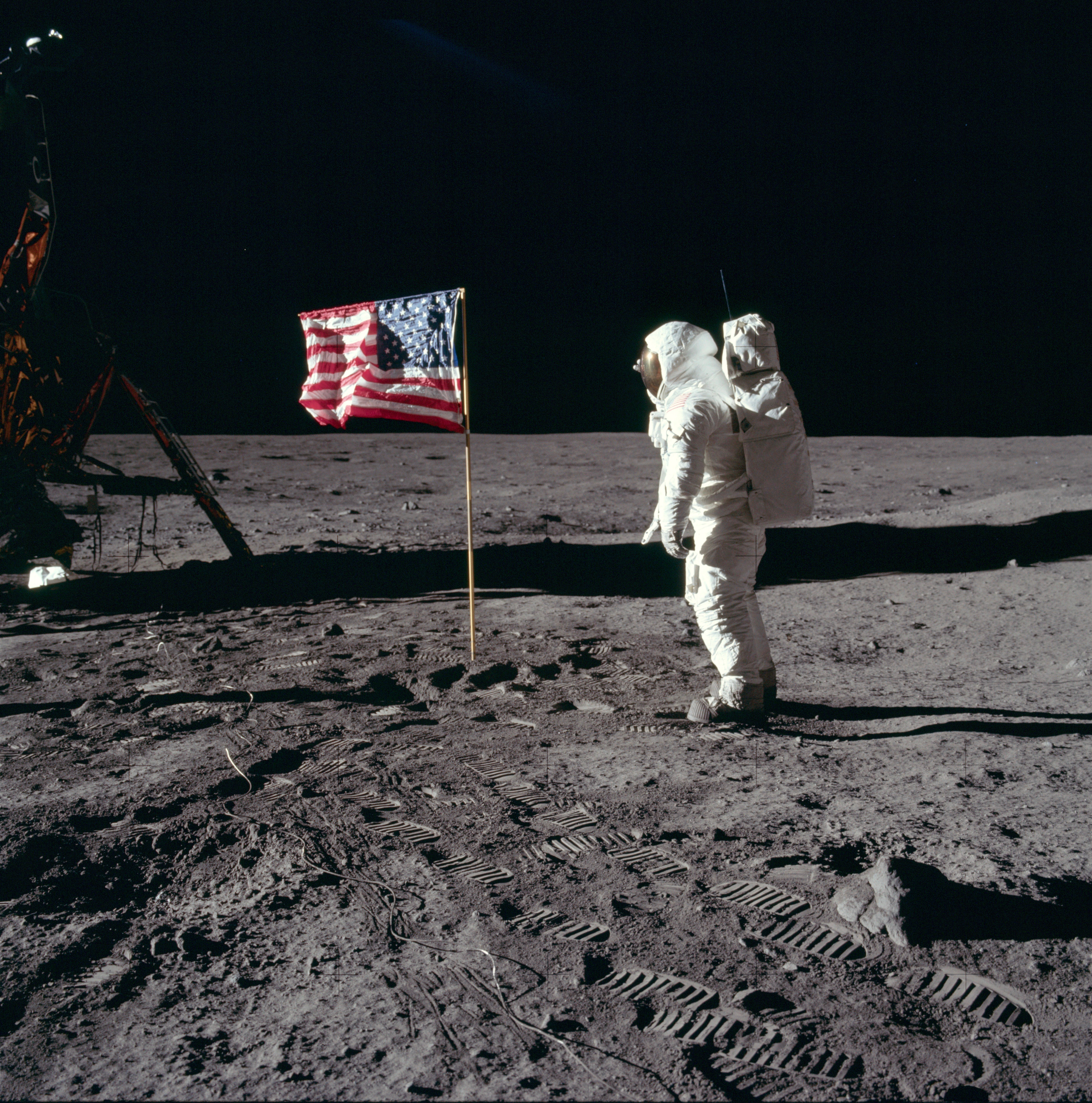
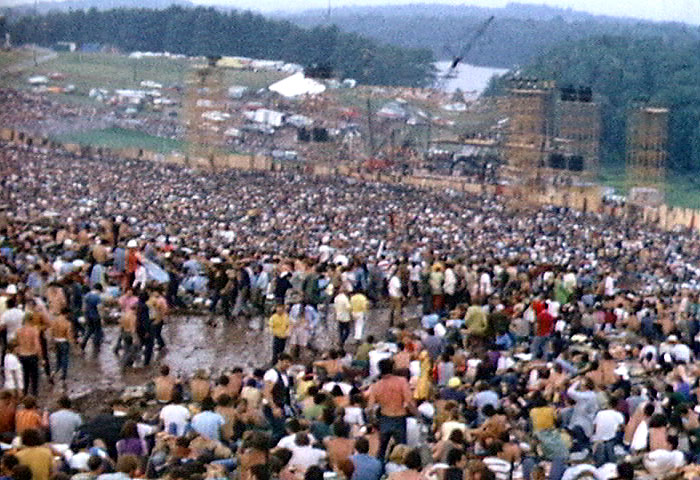
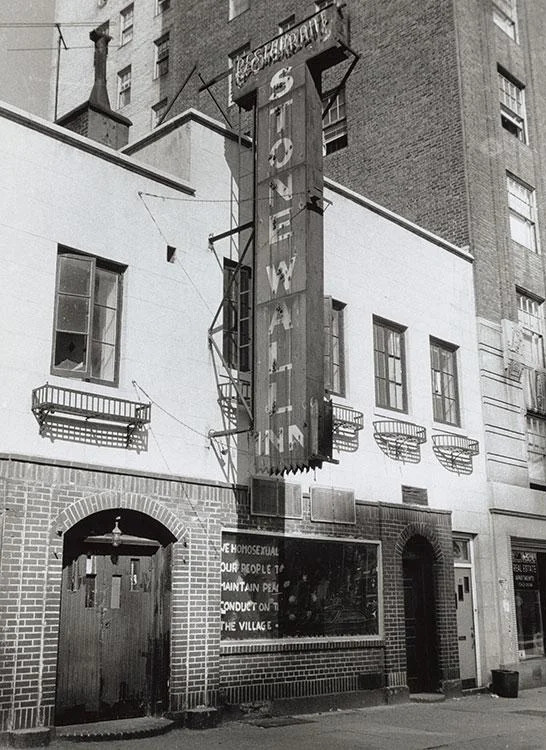
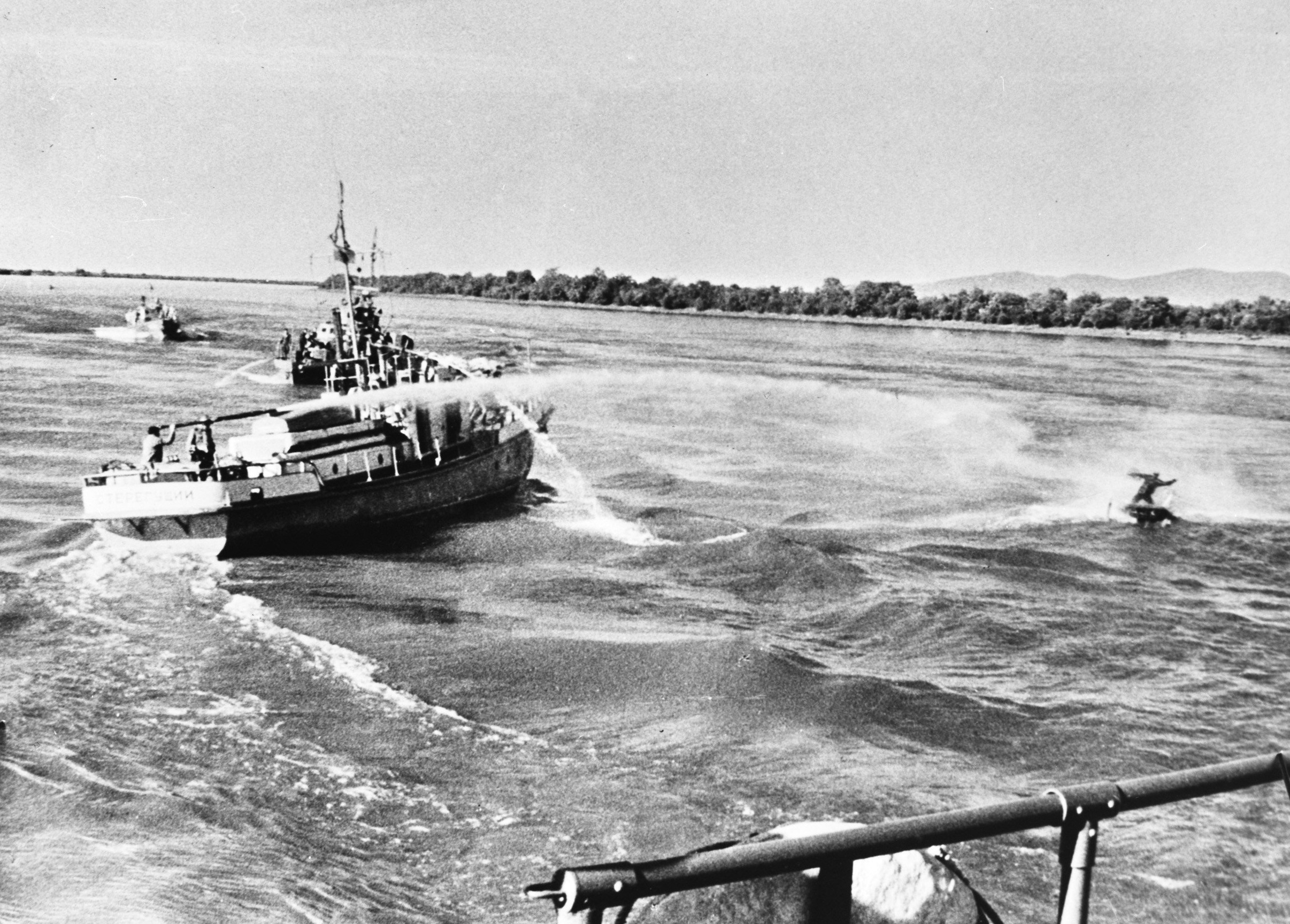
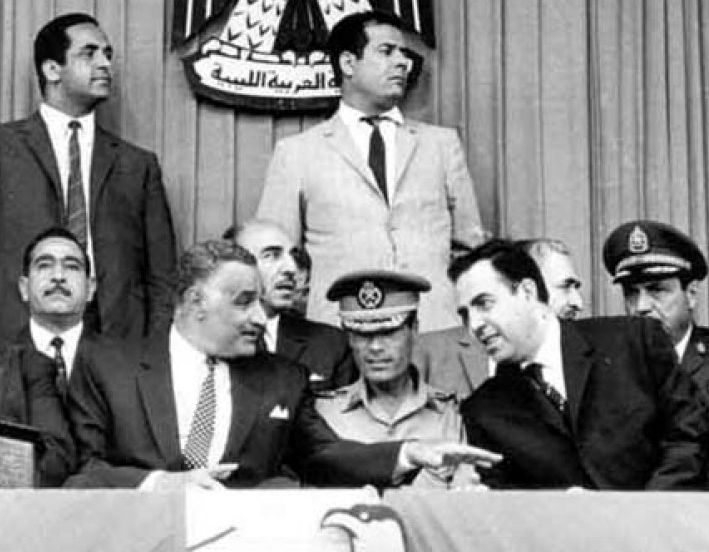
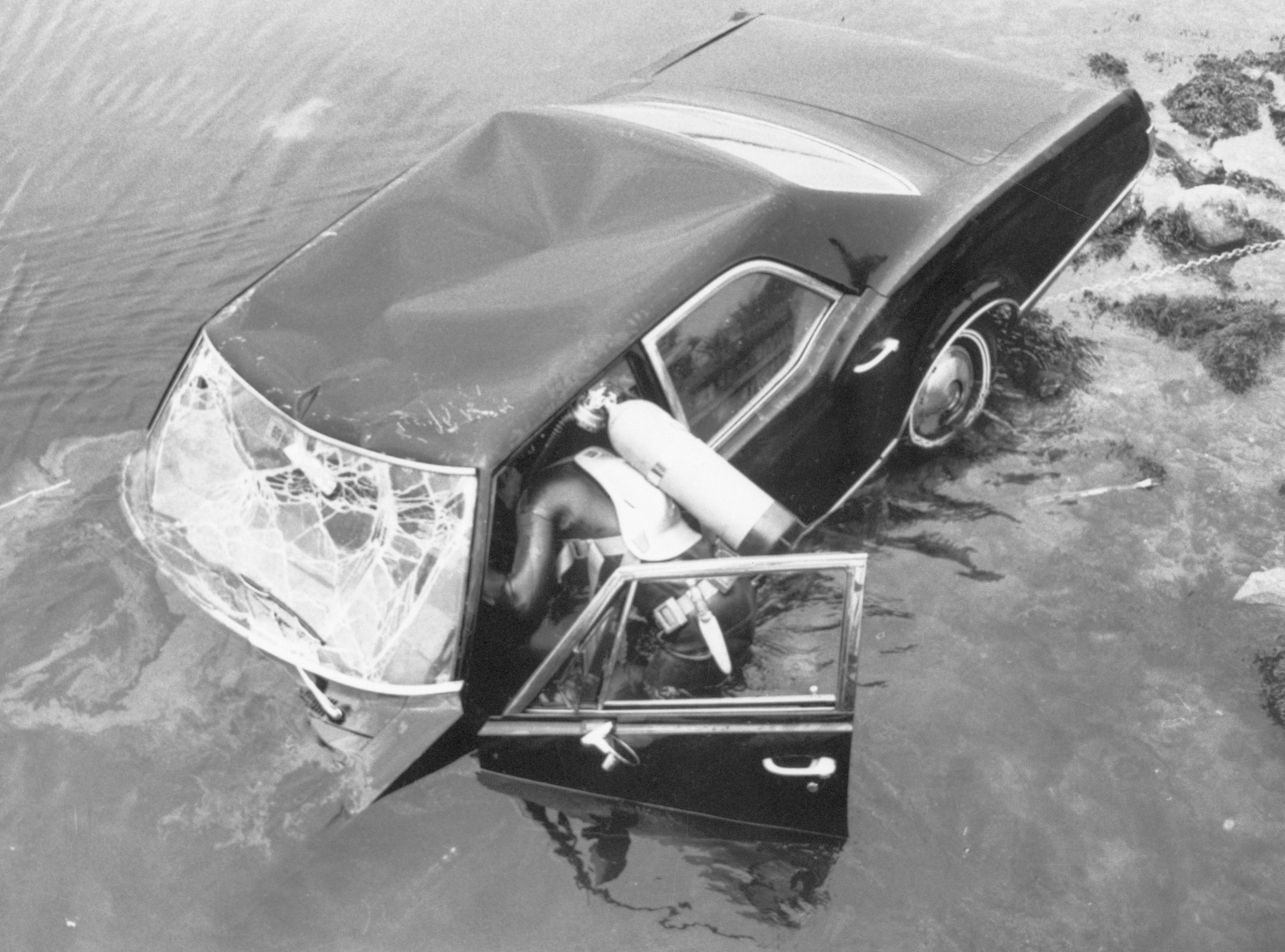
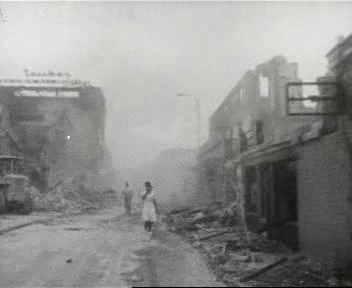
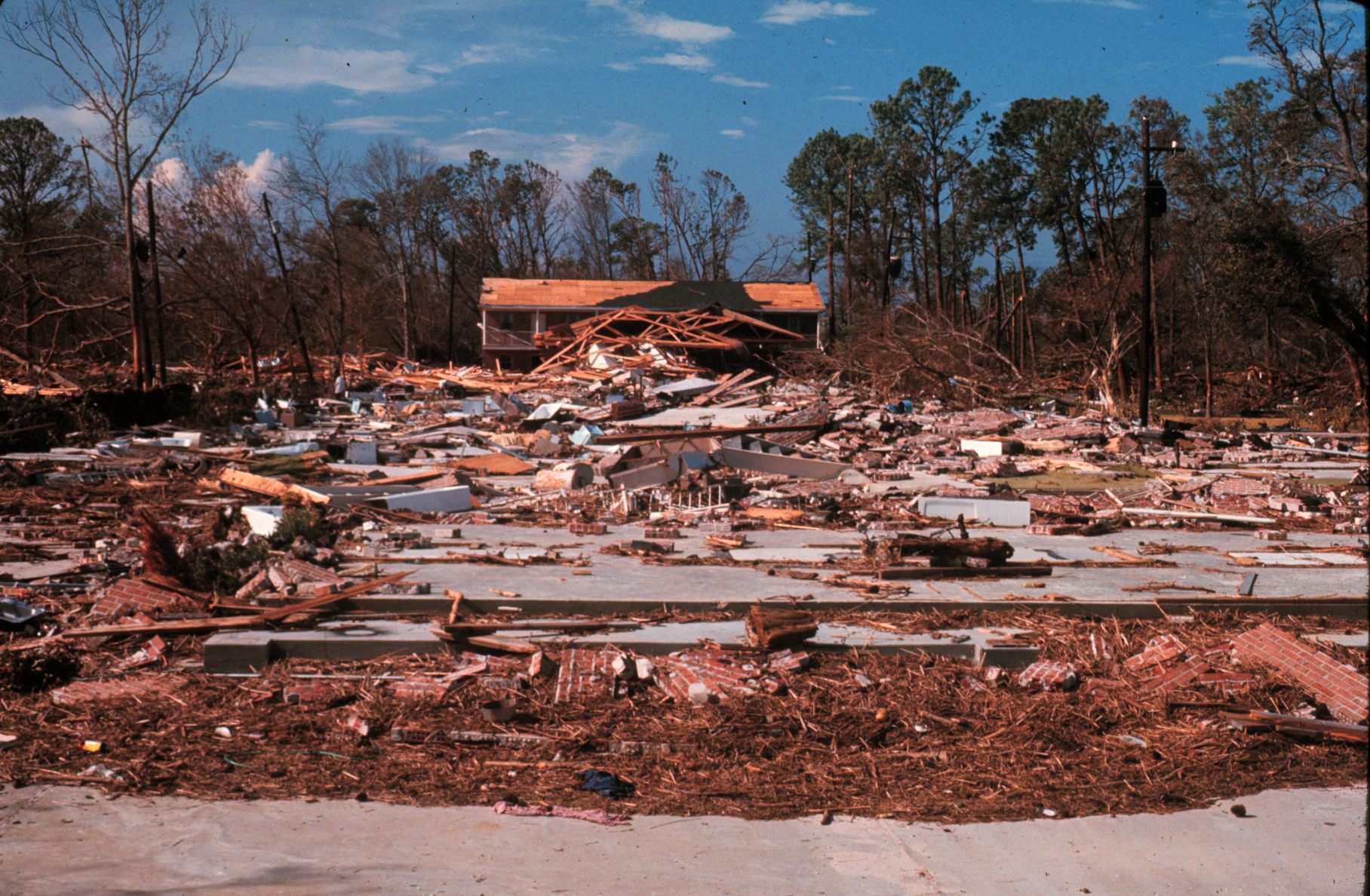
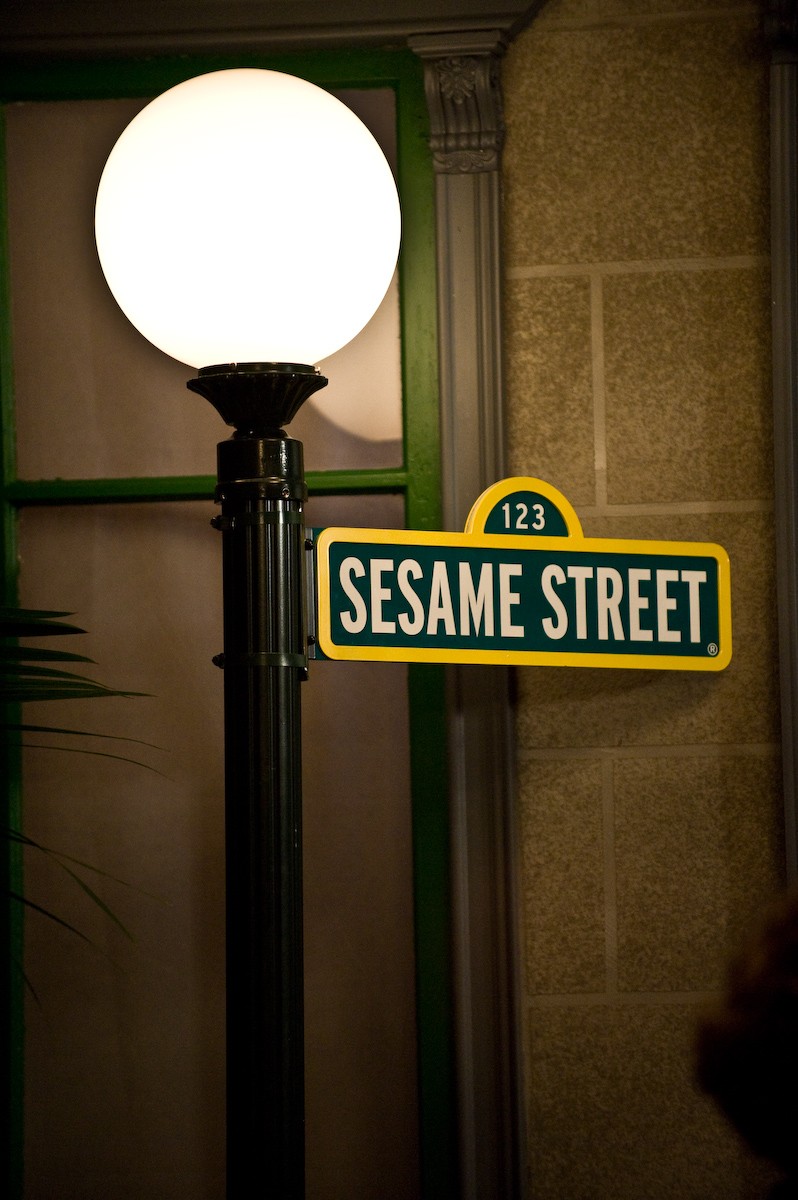
From top to bottom, left to right: Apollo 11 lands the first humans on the Moon as Neil Armstrong and Buzz Aldrin walk on its surface; Woodstock draws over 400,000 people and becomes a counterculture landmark; the Stonewall riots ignite the modern LGBT rights movement; the Sino-Soviet border conflict heightens tensions between China and the Soviet Union; the 1969 Libyan revolution led by Muammar Gaddafi overthrows King Idris I; the Chappaquiddick incident involving Senator Edward Kennedy results in Mary Jo Kopechne's death; the 1969 Curaçao uprising erupts over labor and racial issues; Hurricane Camille devastates the U.S. Gulf Coast; and Sesame Street premieres, reshaping children’s television.

1969 (MCMLXIX) was a common year starting on Wednesday of the Gregorian calendar, the 1969th year of the Common Era (CE) and Anno Domini (AD) designations, the 969th year of the 2nd millennium, the 69th year of the 20th century, and the 10th and last year of the 1960s decade.

The year's most prominent event was the Apollo 11 moon landing on July 20, where astronauts Neil Armstrong and Buzz Aldrin became the first humans to walk on the Moon.

== Events ==
=== January ===
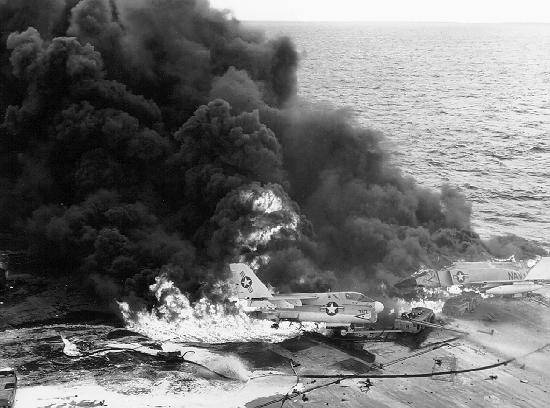
January 14: Explosion kills 27 on USS Enterprise

- January 4 – The government of Spain hands over Ifni to Morocco.
- January 5 – Ariana Afghan Airlines Flight 701 crashes into a house on its approach to London's Gatwick Airport, killing 50 of the 62 people on board and two of the home's occupants.
- January 12 – The New York Jets defeat the Baltimore Colts 16–7 in Super Bowl III.
- January 14 – An explosion aboard the aircraft carrier USS Enterprise near Hawaii kills 28 and injures 314.
- January 16 – First successful docking of two crewed spacecraft in orbit and the first transfer of crew from one space vehicle to another (by a space walk) between Soviet craft Soyuz 5 and Soyuz 4.
- January 18 – Failure of Soyuz 5's service module to separate correctly causes a near-fatal re-entry (not publicly acknowledged until 1997). The module makes a hard landing in the Ural Mountains.
- January 19 – End of the siege of the University of Tokyo, marking the beginning of the end for the 1968–69 Japanese university protests.
- January 20 – Richard Nixon is sworn in as the 37th president of the United States of America.
- January 22 – Attempted assassination of Leonid Brezhnev, the Soviet leader, by deserter Viktor Ilyin. One person is killed, several are injured; Brezhnev escapes unharmed. Very little is publicly admitted about the incident by the Soviet authorities at this time.
- January 27
  - Fourteen men, 9 of them Jews, are executed in Baghdad for spying for Israel.
  - Reverend Ian Paisley, Northern Irish Unionist leader and founder of the Free Presbyterian Church of Ulster is jailed for three months for illegal assembly.
- January 28 – 1969 Santa Barbara oil spill: A blowout on Union Oil's Platform A spills 80,000 to 100,000 barrels of crude oil into a channel and onto the beaches of Santa Barbara County in Southern California; on February 5 the oil spill closes Santa Barbara's harbor. The incident inspires Wisconsin Senator Gaylord Nelson to organize the first Earth Day in 1970.

=== February ===
- February 4 – In Cairo, Yasser Arafat is elected Palestine Liberation Organization leader at the Palestinian National Congress.
- February 8
  - The Allende meteorite explodes over Mexico.
  - After 147 years, the last weekly issue of The Saturday Evening Post is published in the United States. (The magazine is later briefly resurrected as a monthly magazine.)
- February 9 – The Boeing 747 "jumbo jet" is flown for the first time, taking off from the Boeing airfield at Everett, Washington.
- February 13 – Front de libération du Québec (FLQ) terrorists bomb the Montreal Stock Exchange.
- February 14 – Pope Paul VI issues Mysterii Paschalis, a motu proprio, deleting many names from the Roman calendar of saints (including Valentine, who was celebrated on this day).
- February 17 – Aquanaut Berry L. Cannon dies of carbon dioxide poisoning while attempting to repair the SEALAB III habitat off San Clemente Island, California.
- February 24 – The Mariner 6 Mars probe is launched from the United States.
- February 28 – The 1969 Portugal earthquake hits Portugal, Spain and Morocco.

=== March ===
- March 2
  - In Toulouse, France the first Concorde test flight is conducted.
  - Soviet and Chinese forces clash at a border outpost on the Ussuri River.
- March 3
  - Apollo program: NASA launches Apollo 9 (James McDivitt, Rusty Schweickart, David Scott) to test the lunar module.
  - In a Los Angeles court, Sirhan Sirhan admits that he killed presidential candidate Robert F. Kennedy.
- March 13 – Apollo program: Apollo 9 returns safely to Earth after testing the Lunar Module.
- March 16 – Viasa Flight 742 crashes into a neighborhood in Maracaibo, Venezuela, shortly after taking off for Miami; all 84 people on board the DC-9 jet are killed along with 71 people on the ground.
- March 17
  - Golda Meir becomes the first female prime minister of Israel.
  - The Longhope life-boat is lost after answering a mayday call during severe storms in the Pentland Firth between Orkney and the northern tip of Scotland; the entire crew of 8 die.
- March 18 – An annular solar eclipse is visible in the Indian and Pacific Oceans, and is the 49th solar eclipse of Solar Saros 129.
- March 20
  - One hundred of the 105 passengers and crew on a United Arab Airlines flight, most of them Muslim pilgrims returning to Aswan from Mecca, are killed when the Ilyushin-18 turboprop crashes during a sandstorm.
  - John Lennon and Yoko Ono are married at Gibraltar, and proceed to their honeymoon "Bed-in" for peace in Amsterdam.
- March 22
  - UCLA wins its third consecutive NCAA basketball championship by defeating Purdue University, 92 to 72.
  - The landmark art exhibition When Attitudes become Form, curated by Harald Szeemann, opens at the Kunsthalle Bern in Bern, Switzerland.
- March 25 - Ayub Khan resigns as President of Pakistan and transfers the power to Yahya Khan.
- March 28 – Pope Paul VI increases the number of Roman Catholic cardinals by one-third, from 101 to 134.
- March 29 – The Eurovision Song Contest 1969 is held in Madrid, and results in four co-winners, with 18 votes each, from Spain, the United Kingdom, the Netherlands, and France.
- March 30 – The body of former United States General and President Dwight D. Eisenhower is brought by caisson to the United States Capitol to lie in state in the Capitol Rotunda; Eisenhower had died two days earlier, after a long illness, in the Walter Reed Army Medical Center, Washington, D.C.
- March 31 – The Barroterán coal mine disaster kills 153 coal miners in Mexico.

=== April ===
- April 3 – The Mass of Paul VI is promulgated in the Catholic Church by the Pope.
- April 4 – Denton Cooley implants the first temporary artificial heart.
- April 9 – Fermín Monasterio Pérez is murdered by ETA in Biscay, Spain; the 4th victim in the name of Basque nationalism.
- April 15 – The EC-121 shootdown incident: North Korea shoots down a US reconnaissance aircraft over the Sea of Japan, killing all 31 on board.
- April 17 – Sirhan Bishara Sirhan is found guilty of the assassination of Robert F. Kennedy.
- April 20 – British troops arrive in Northern Ireland to reinforce the Royal Ulster Constabulary.
- April 22 – English sailor Robin Knox-Johnston becomes the first person to sail around the world solo without stopping.
- April 28 – Charles de Gaulle steps down as president of France after suffering defeat in a referendum the day before.

=== May ===
- May 10 – The Battle of Dong Ap Bia, also known as Hamburger Hill, begins during the Vietnam War.
- May 13 – May 13 Incident: Race riots occur in Kuala Lumpur, Malaysia.
- May 15 – An American teenager known as 'Robert R.' dies in St. Louis, Missouri, United States, of a baffling medical condition. In 1984 it will be identified as the earliest confirmed case of HIV/AIDS in North America.
- May 16 – Venera program: Soviet space probe Venera 5 lands on Venus.
- May 17 – Venera program: Soviet space probe Venera 6 begins to descend into Venus's atmosphere, sending back atmospheric data before being crushed by pressure.
- May 18 – Apollo program: Apollo 10 (Gene Cernan, Tom Stafford, John Young) is launched. It is to be a full rehearsal for the Moon landing, stopping 15 kilometers short of actually reaching the lunar surface.
- May 20 – United States National Guard helicopters spray skin-stinging powder on anti-war protesters in California.
- May 21 – Rosariazo: Civil unrest breaks out in Rosario, Argentina, following the death of a 15-year-old student.
- May 22 – Apollo program: Apollo 10's lunar module flies to within 15,400 m of the Moon's surface.
- May 26
  - The Andean Pact (Andean Group) is established.
  - Apollo program: Apollo 10 returns to Earth, after a successful 8-day test of all the components needed for the upcoming first crewed Moon landing.
- May 29 – Cordobazo: A general strike and civil unrest break out in Córdoba, Argentina.
- May 30 – Riots in Curaçao mark the start of an Afro-Caribbean civil rights movement on the island.

=== June ===
- June 3 – While operating at sea on SEATO maneuvers, the Australian aircraft carrier HMAS Melbourne accidentally rams and slices into the American destroyer USS Frank E. Evans in the South China Sea, killing 74 American seamen.
- June 5 – An international communist conference begins in Moscow.
- June 8
  - Francisco Franco orders the closing of the Gibraltar–Spain border and communications between Gibraltar and Spain in response to the 1967 Gibraltar sovereignty referendum. The border remains closed until a partial reopening on December 15, 1982.
  - U.S. President Richard Nixon and South Vietnamese President Nguyễn Văn Thiệu meet at Midway Island. Nixon announces that 25,000 U.S. troops will be withdrawn by September.
- June 15 – Georges Pompidou is elected President of France.
- June 24 – The United Kingdom and Rhodesia sever diplomatic relations, after the Rhodesian constitutional referendum.
- June 27 – Gay intercourse is officially legalized in Canada.
- June 28 – The Stonewall riots, a milestone in the modern gay rights movement in the United States, began in New York City.

=== July ===
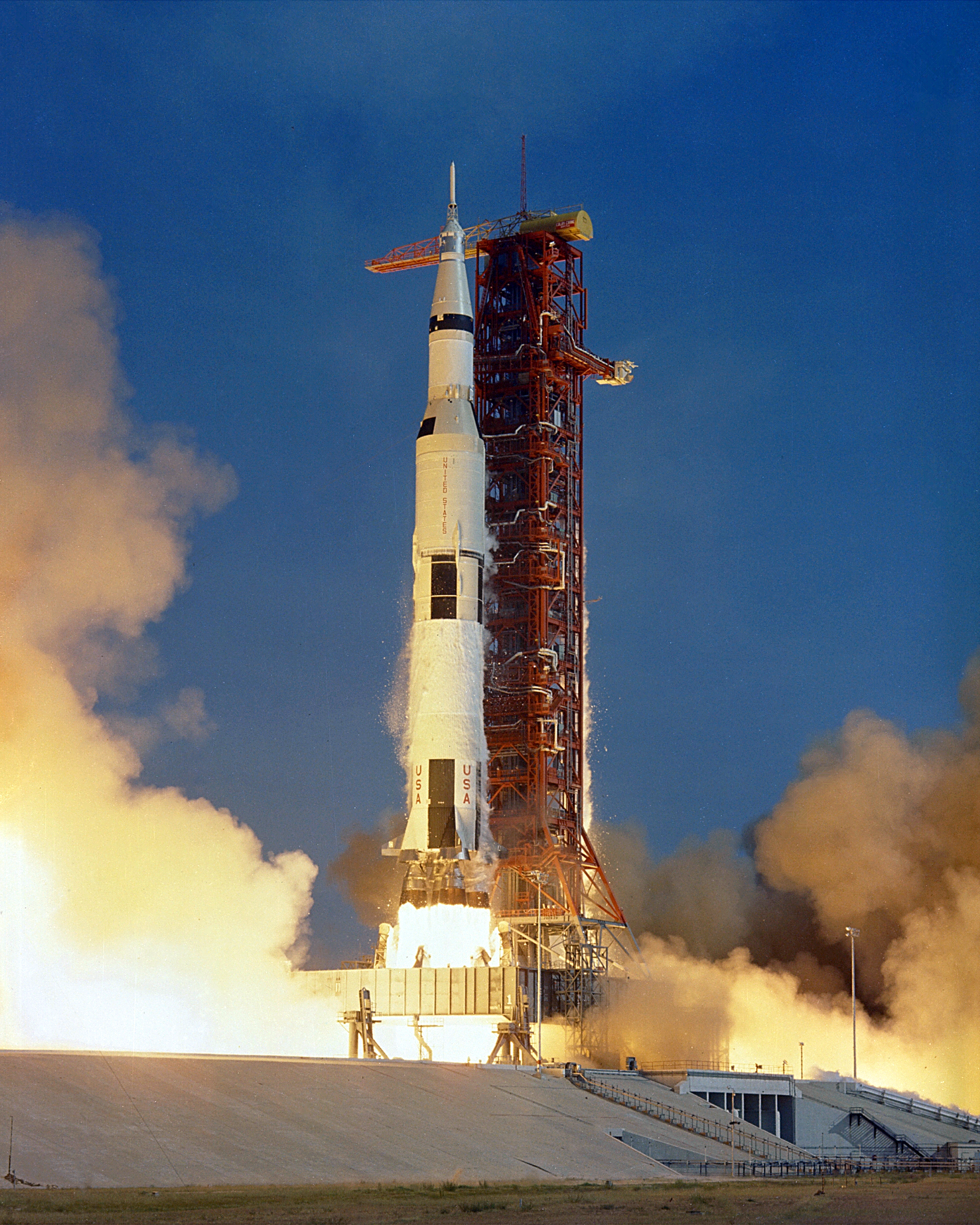
July 16: The Saturn V rocket is launched

July 20: Buzz Aldrin descends a ladder to become the second human to step onto the surface of the Moon during the Apollo 11 program

- July 7 – French is made equal to English throughout the Canadian national government.
- July 8 – Vietnam War: The first U.S. troop withdrawals are made.
- July 14
  - Football War: After Honduras loses an association football match against El Salvador, rioting breaks out in Honduras against Salvadoran migrant workers. Of the 300,000 Salvadoran workers in Honduras, tens of thousands are expelled, prompting a brief Salvadoran invasion of Honduras. The OAS works out a cease-fire on July 18, which takes effect on July 20.
  - The Act of Free Choice for West Irian commences in Merauke, Indonesia.
- July 16 – Apollo program: Apollo 11 (Buzz Aldrin, Neil Armstrong, Michael Collins) lifts off from Cape Kennedy in Florida towards the first crewed landing on the Moon.
- July 19
  - Chappaquiddick incident: US Senator Edward M. Kennedy drives off a bridge into a tidal pond after leaving a party on Chappaquiddick Island, Massachusetts, killing Mary Jo Kopechne. Kennedy does not report the accident for nine or ten hours.
  - John Fairfax lands in Hollywood Beach, Florida, United States, and becomes the first person to row across an ocean solo, after 180 days spent at sea on board the 25' ocean rowboat Britannia (left Gran Canaria on January 20, 1969).
- July 20
  - Apollo program Moon landing: At 3:17 pm ET (20:17 UTC) Apollo 11's Lunar Module Eagle lands on the Moon's surface. At 10:56 pm ET (02:56 UTC July 21), an estimated 650 million people worldwide, the largest television audience for a live broadcast at this time, watch in awe as Neil Armstrong takes his first historic steps on the surface.
  - 1969 Tour de France: Belgian Eddy Merckx wins the cycle race for the first time.
- July 22 – Spanish dictator and head of state Francisco Franco appoints Prince Juan Carlos to be his successor as head of state following his death.
- July 24
  - Apollo program: Apollo 11 returns from the first successful Moon landing and the astronauts are placed in biological isolation for several days in case they may have brought back lunar germs. The airless lunar environment is later determined to rule out microscopic life.
  - The Soviet Union returns British lecturer Gerald Brooke to the United Kingdom freed from a Soviet prison in exchange for their spies Peter and Helen Kroger (Morris and Lona Cohen).
- July 26 – A 6.4 earthquake shakes the Chinese city of Yangjiang destroying thousands of homes and killing 3,000 people.
- July 30 – Vietnam War: U.S. President Richard Nixon makes an unscheduled visit to South Vietnam, meeting with President Nguyễn Văn Thiệu and U.S. military commanders.
- July 31 – Pope Paul VI arrives in Entebbe, Uganda for the first visit by a reigning Pope to Africa.

=== August ===
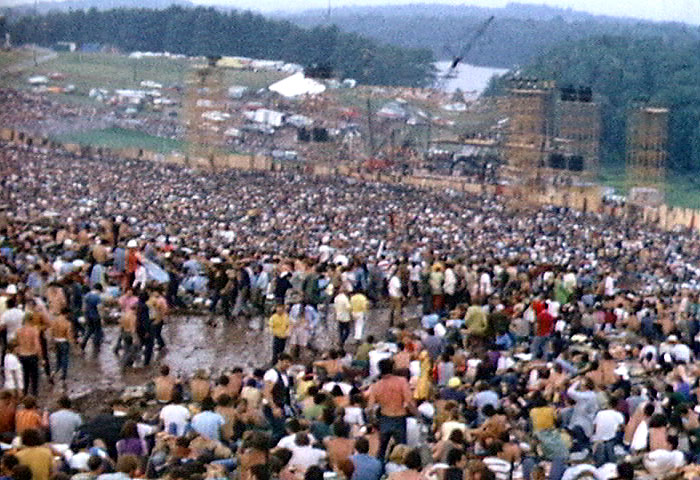
August 15–18: Woodstock Festival is held

- August 2 – U.S. President Richard Nixon visits Romania, becoming the first incumbent U.S. president to visit a communist state since the start of the Cold War.
- August 4
  - Vietnam War: At the apartment of French intermediary Jean Sainteny in Paris, U.S. representative Henry Kissinger and North Vietnamese representative Xuan Thuy begin secret peace negotiations. They eventually fail since the two sides cannot agree to any terms.
  - The Zodiac Killer adopts his persona in a letter in which he introduces himself with the phrase, "This is the Zodiac speaking."
- August 5 – Mariner program: Mariner 7 makes its closest fly-by of Mars (3,524 kilometres (2,190 mi)).
- August 9 – On orders from Charles Manson, members of the Manson Family invade the Los Angeles home of film director Roman Polanski, and murder his pregnant wife, the actress Sharon Tate, and four others.
- August 10 – A day after murdering Sharon Tate and four others, members of the Manson Family kill Leno and Rosemary LaBianca in Los Angeles.
- August 13 – Serious border clashes occur between the Soviet Union and the People's Republic of China.
- August 14 – The Troubles: British troops are deployed in Northern Ireland to restore order following three days of political and sectarian violence, marking the beginning of the 37-year Operation Banner.
- August 15–18 – The Woodstock Festival is held near White Lake, New York, featuring some of the top rock musicians of the era.
- August 17 – Category 5 Hurricane Camille hits the Mississippi coast of the United States, killing 248 people and causing US$1.5 billion in damage (1969 USD).
- August 21 – Australian Denis Michael Rohan sets fire to the Al-Aqsa Mosque in Jerusalem.
- August 29 – A Trans World Airlines flight from Rome to Tel Aviv is hijacked and diverted to Syria.

=== September ===
- September 1
  - 1969 Libyan coup d'état: A bloodless coup in Libya ousts King Idris and brings Colonel Muammar Gaddafi to power.
  - For Brazil, the Jornal Nacional was created on Monday, 1 September 1969.
- September 2 – Ho Chi Minh, the president of Democratic Republic of Vietnam, died at the age of 79.
- September 5 – Lieutenant William Calley is charged with six counts of premeditated murder for the 1968 My Lai Massacre deaths of 109 Vietnamese civilians in My Lai, Vietnam.
- September 9 – Allegheny Airlines Flight 853, a DC-9 airliner, collides in flight with a small Piper PA-28 airplane, and crashes near Fairland, Indiana, killing all 83 people in both aircraft.
- September 11 – An annular solar eclipse is visible in Pacific Ocean and South America, and is the 41st solar eclipse of Solar Saros 134.
- September 13 – Scooby-Doo, Where Are You! premieres on CBS, starting the Scooby-Doo franchise.
- September 22–25 – An Islamic conference in Rabat, Morocco, following the al-Aqsa Mosque fire (August 21), condemns the Israeli claim of ownership of Jerusalem.
- September 23 – China carries out an underground nuclear bomb test.
- September 25 – The Organisation of the Islamic Conference is founded.
- September 26 – The Beatles release their eleventh studio album, Abbey Road in the United Kingdom
- September 28 – 1969 West German federal election: The Social Democrats, led by Vice Chancellor Willy Brandt, and the Free Democrats led by Walter Scheel, formed a coalition government with Brandt as Chancellor, after the Social Democrats severed their relationship with Chancellor Kurt Georg Kiesinger's Christian Democratic Union.

=== October ===
- October 1
  - In Sweden, Olof Palme is elected Leader of the Social Democratic Worker's Party, replacing Tage Erlander as Prime Minister on October 14.
  - The Beijing Subway begins operation.
- October 2 – A 1.2 megaton thermonuclear device is tested at Amchitka Island, Alaska. This test is code-named Project Milrow, the 11th test of the Operation Mandrel 1969–1970 underground nuclear test series. This test is known as a "calibration shot" to test if the island is fit for larger underground nuclear detonations.
- October 9–12 – Days of Rage: In Chicago, the Illinois National Guard is called in to control demonstrations involving the radical Weathermen, in connection with the "Chicago Eight" Trial.
- October 11 – The Zodiac Killer shoots and kills taxi driver Paul Stine in the Presidio Heights neighborhood of San Francisco; this is the serial killer's last known murder.
- October 11–16 – The New York Mets upset the Baltimore Orioles four games to one in the World Series.
- October 15 –
  - Vietnam War: Hundreds of thousands of people take part in Moratorium to End the War in Vietnam demonstrations across the United States.
- October 17 – Willard Boyle and George E. Smith invent the CCD at Bell Laboratories (30 years later, this technology is widely used in digital cameras).
- October 20 – Experimental research showing that protons were composed of smaller particles, the first evidence of quarks, is published.
- October 21
  - Willy Brandt becomes Chancellor of West Germany.
  - General Siad Barre comes to power in Somalia in a coup, 6 days after the assassination of President Abdirashid Ali Shermarke.
- October 25 – 1969 Australian federal election: John Gorton's Liberal/Country Coalition government is narrowly re-elected with a sharply reduced majority, defeating a resurgent Labor Party led by Gough Whitlam. Prime Minister Gorton survived a leadership challenge by his deputy William McMahon as well as David Fairbairn in the immediate aftermath of the election.
- October 29 – The first electronic message is sent between two computers connected via ARPANET between University of California, Los Angeles and SRI International in California at around 10:30pm local time, the initial forerunning technology to the Internet.

=== November ===
- November 3 – Süleyman Demirel of AP forms the new government of Turkey (31st government).
- November 14
  - Apollo program: NASA launches Apollo 12 (Pete Conrad, Richard Gordon, Alan Bean), the second crewed mission to the Moon.
  - The SS United States, the last active United States Lines passenger ship, is withdrawn from service.
- November 15 – Cold War: The Soviet submarine K-19 collides with the American submarine USS Gato in the Barents Sea.
- November 17 – Cold War: Negotiators from the Soviet Union and the United States meet in Helsinki, to begin the SALT I negotiations aimed at limiting the number of strategic weapons on both sides.
- November 19
  - Apollo program: Apollo 12 astronauts Charles Conrad and Alan Bean land at Oceanus Procellarum ("Ocean of Storms"), becoming the third and fourth humans to walk on the Moon.
  - Professional footballer Pelé scores his 1,000th goal.
  - Vietnam War: A Cleveland, Ohio newspaper, The Plain Dealer, publishes explicit photographs of dead villagers from the My Lai Massacre in Vietnam.
  - Richard Oakes returns with 90 followers to Alcatraz Island and begins a 19 month long occupation, lasting until June 1971.
- November 21
  - U.S. President Richard Nixon and Japanese Premier Eisaku Satō agree in Washington, D.C. to the return of Okinawa to Japanese control in 1972. Under the terms of the agreement, the U.S. retains rights to military bases on the island, but they must be nuclear-free.
  - The first ARPANET link is established (the progenitor of the global Internet).
- November 24 – Apollo program: The Apollo 12 spacecraft splashes down safely in the Pacific Ocean, ending the second crewed mission to the Moon.

=== December ===
- December 1 – Vietnam War: The first draft lottery in the United States since World War II is held. September 14 is the first of the 366 days of the year selected, meaning that anyone born on September 14 in the years from 1944 to 1951 would be the first to be summoned. On January 4, 1970, The New York Times will run a long article, "Statisticians Charge Draft Lottery Was Not Random".
- December 2 – The Boeing 747 jumbo jet makes its first passenger flight. It carries 191 people, most of them reporters and photographers, from Seattle to New York City.
- December 3 – Air France Flight 212, a Boeing 707 registered as F-BHSZ, crashed shortly after takeoff from Venezuela killing all 62 occupants on board. The cause of the accident is not yet known since the Bureau of Enquiry and Analysis for Civil Aviation Safety (BEA) did not publish an investigation report. It will not be released until 2029, sixty years after the accident.
- December 12 – The Piazza Fontana bombing in Milan, Italy, kills 17 people and injures 88.
- December 24
  - The oil company Phillips Petroleum makes the first oil discovery in the Norwegian sector of North Sea.
  - Nigerian troops capture Umuahia. The last Biafran capital before its dissolution becomes Owerri.
- December 27 – The Liberal Democratic Party wins 47.6% of the votes in the 1969 Japanese general election. Future prime ministers Yoshirō Mori and Tsutomu Hata and future kingmaker Ichirō Ozawa are elected for the first time.

=== Date unknown ===
- Summer – Invention of Unix under the potential name "Unics" (after Multics).
- Common African, Malagasy and Mauritian Organization (OCAMM) (Organisation Commune Africaine Malgache et Mauricienne) is established.
- International Convention on Civil Liability for Oil Pollution Damage, a maritime treaty, is adopted.

== Births ==
=== January ===
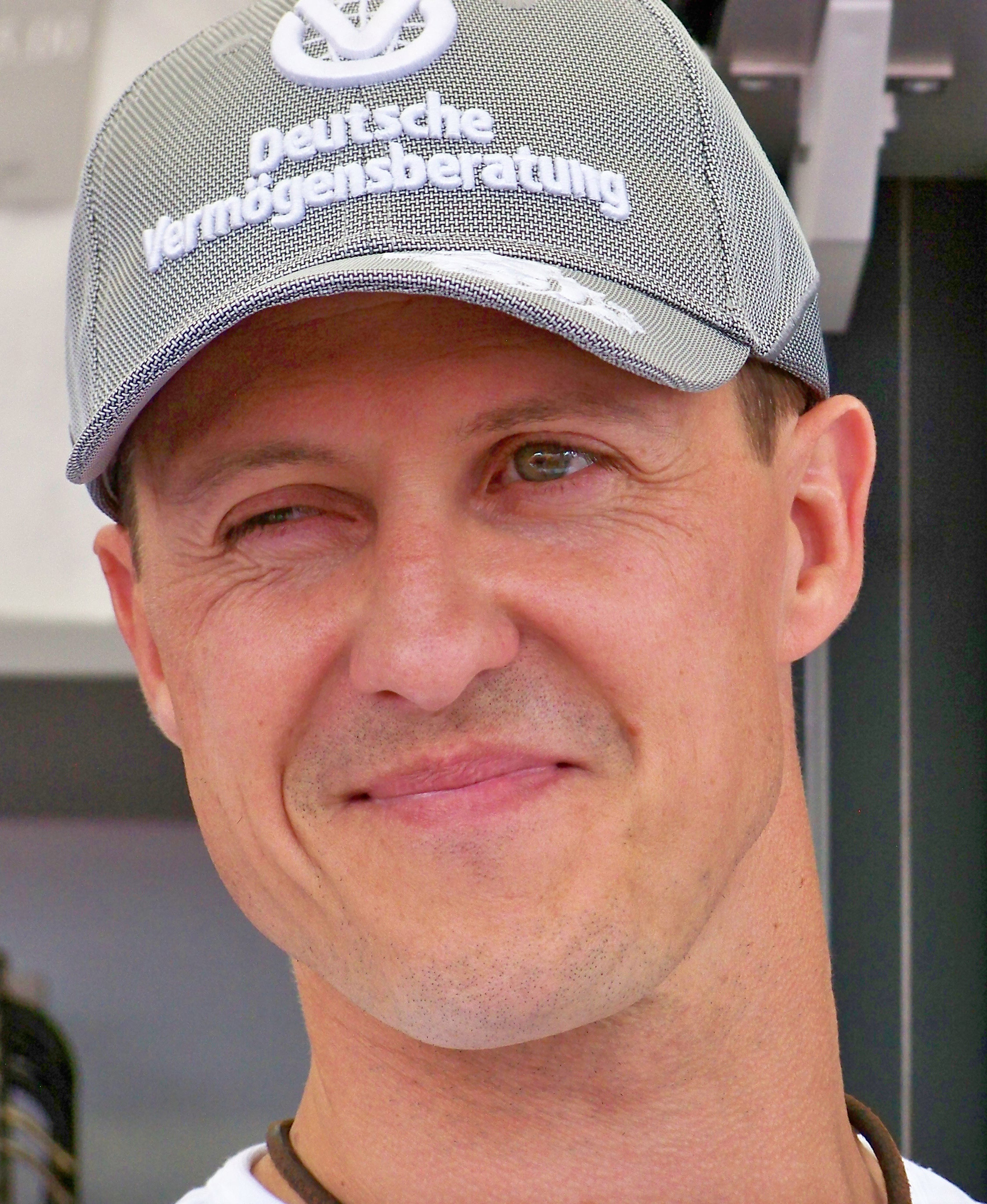
Michael Schumacher

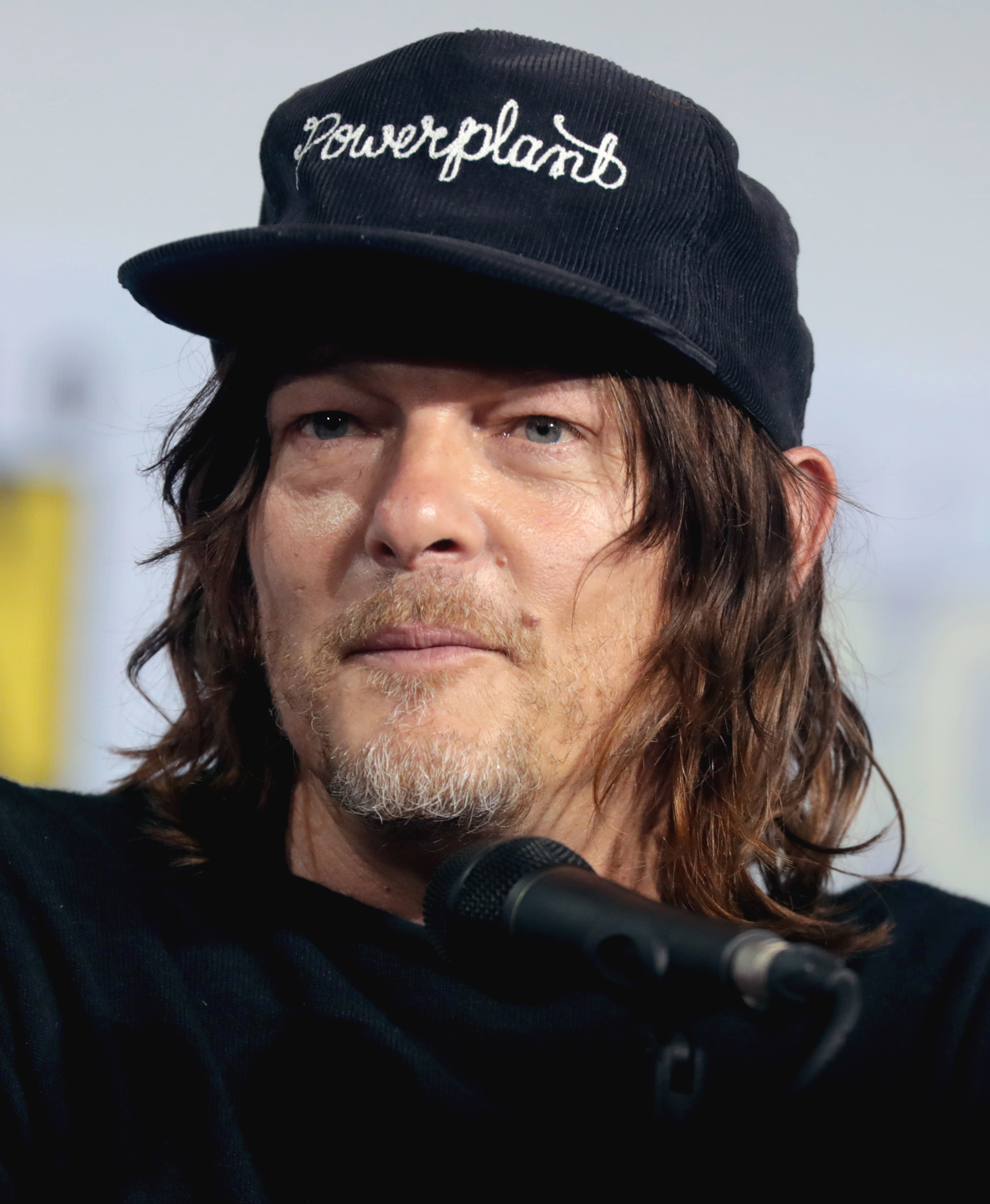
Norman Reedus

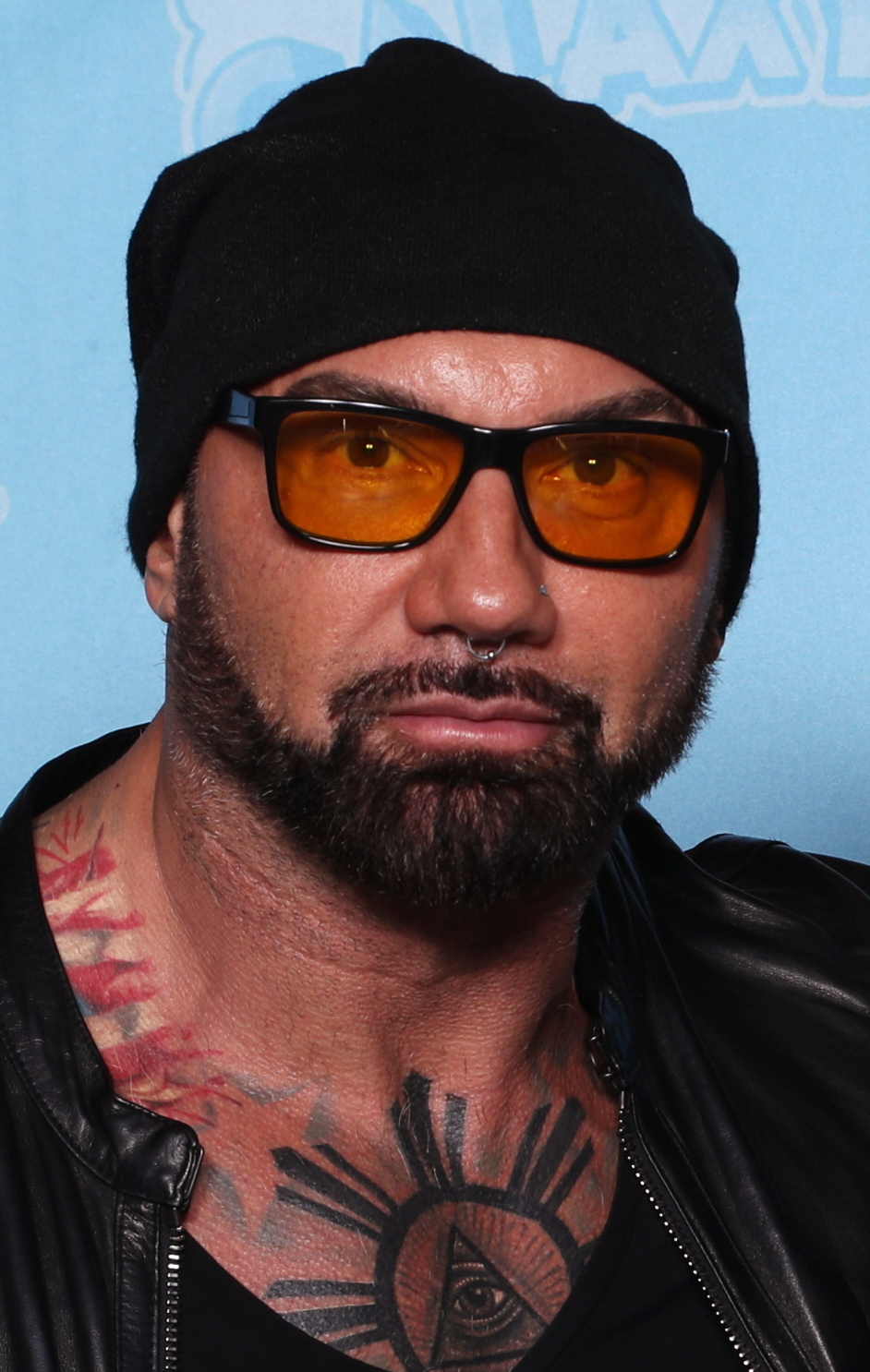
Dave Bautista

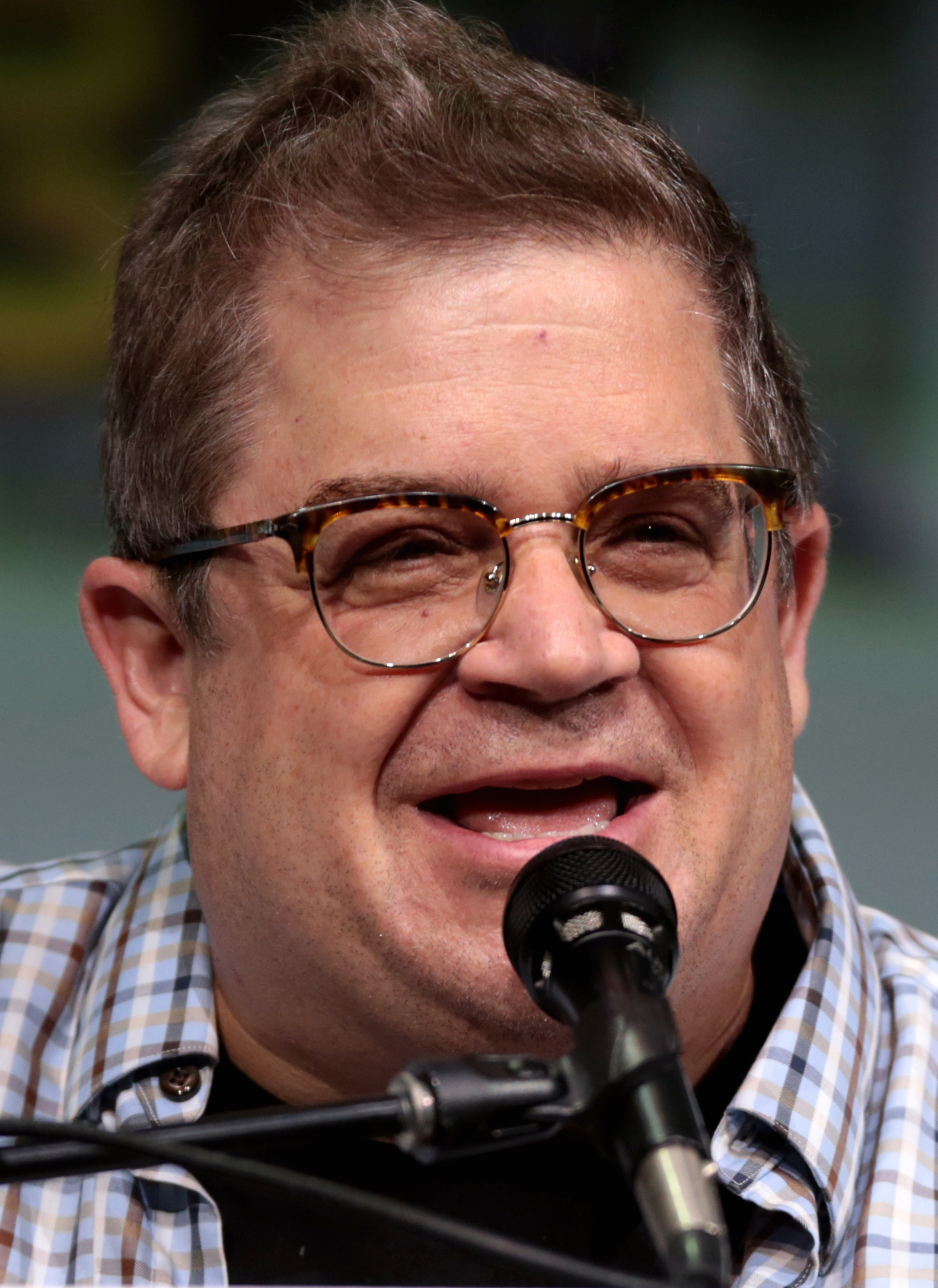
Patton Oswalt

- January 1 – Verne Troyer, American actor (d. 2018)
- January 2
  - Robby Gordon, American racing driver
  - Tommy Morrison, American boxer (d. 2013)
  - Christy Turlington, American fashion model
- January 3 – Michael Schumacher, German seven-time Formula One world champion
- January 5 – Marilyn Manson, American rock musician
- January 6 – Norman Reedus, American actor
- January 7 – Alfredo Romero, Venezuelan activist
- January 11
  - Kyōko Hikami, Japanese voice actress
  - Kyle Richards, American actress
- January 13
  - Beatriz Gutiérrez Müller, Mexican writer, wife of Andrés Manuel López Obrador
  - Stephen Hendry, British snooker player
- January 14
  - Jason Bateman, American actor, director and producer
  - Dave Grohl, American rock drummer and composer
- January 15 – Meret Becker, German actress and musician
- January 16 – Dead, Swedish vocalist (d. 1991)
- January 17 – Lukas Moodysson, Swedish film director
- January 18 – Dave Bautista, American pro wrestler and actor
- January 19
  - Predrag Mijatović, Montenegrin footballer
  - Robert Prosinečki, Croatian football player and coach
- January 27
  - Cornelius, Japanese rock musician, singer and producer
  - Patton Oswalt, American stand-up comedian, writer, actor and voice artist
- January 28 – Kathryn Morris, American actress
- January 31 – Bill Huizenga, American politician

=== February ===
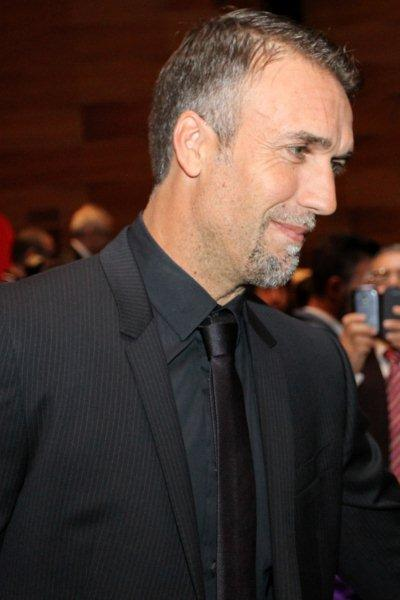
Gabriel Batistuta

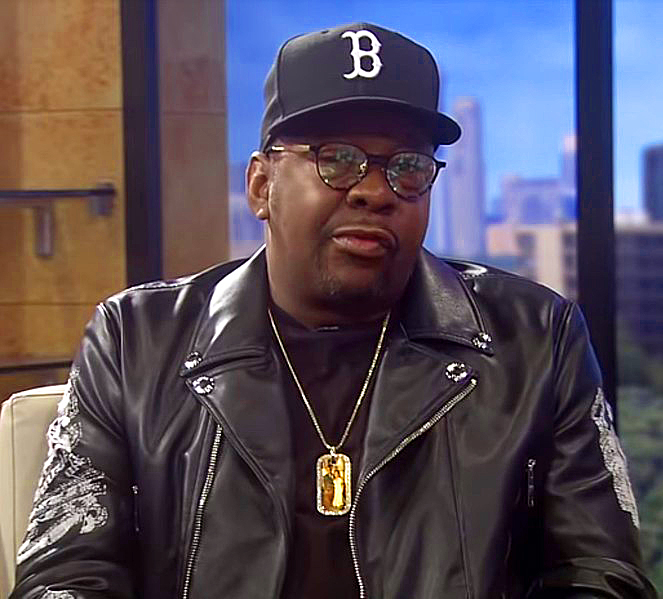
Bobby Brown

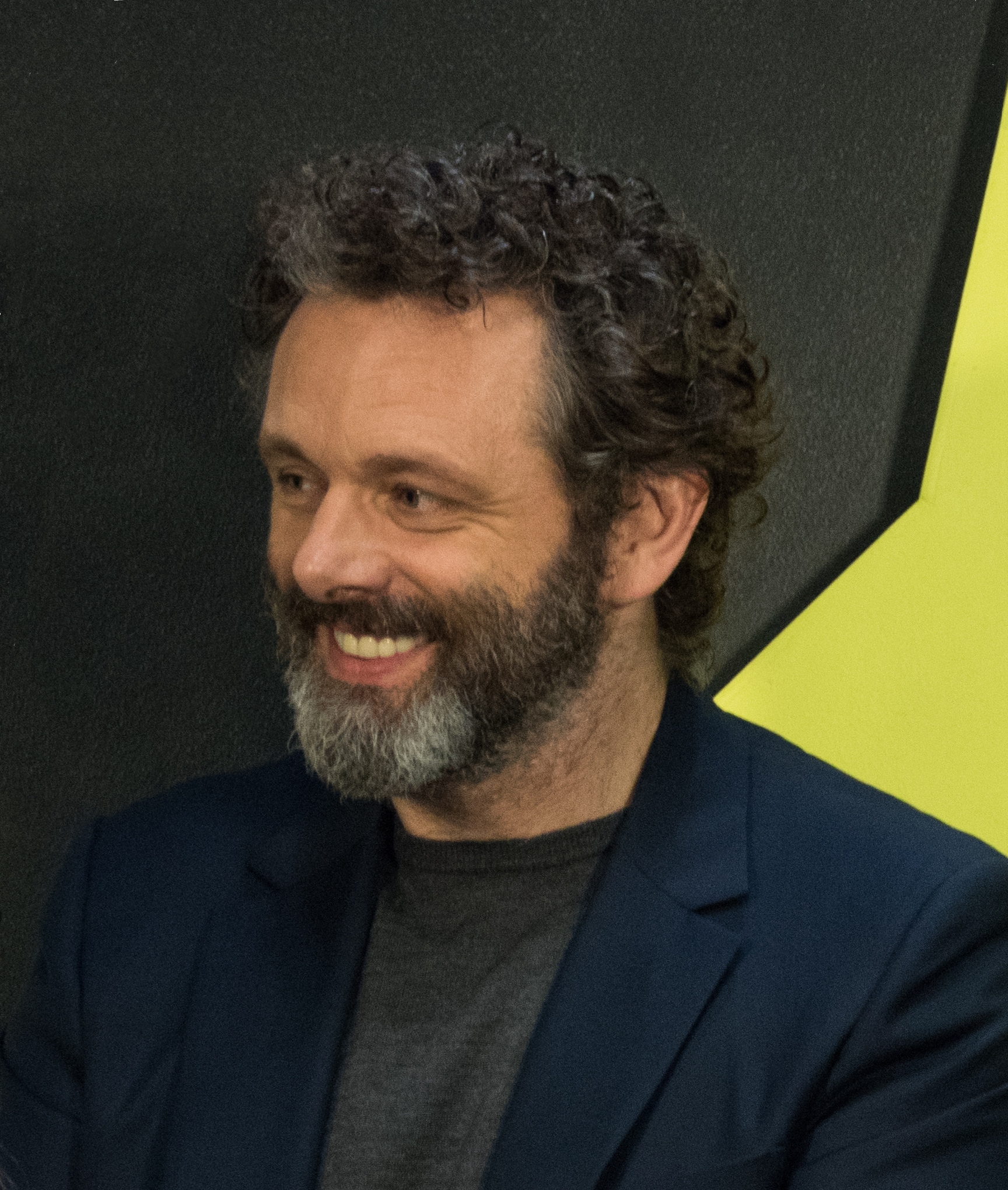
Michael Sheen

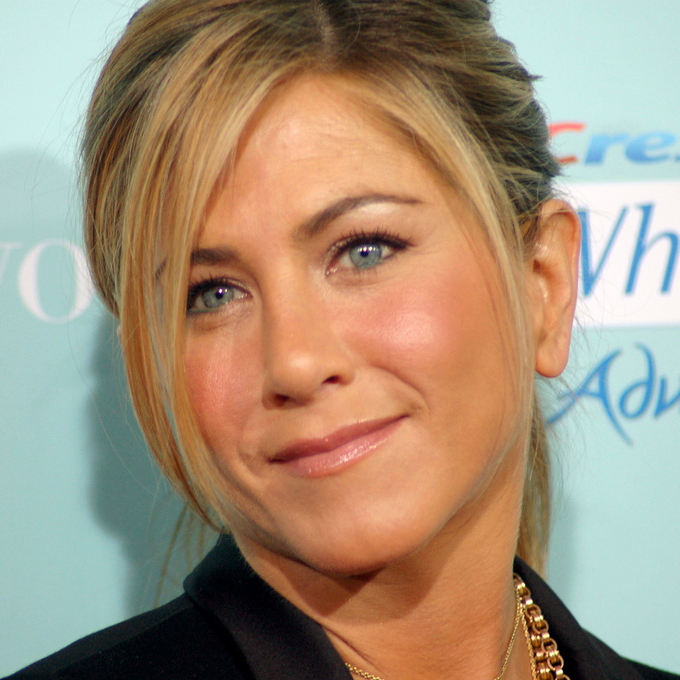
Jennifer Aniston

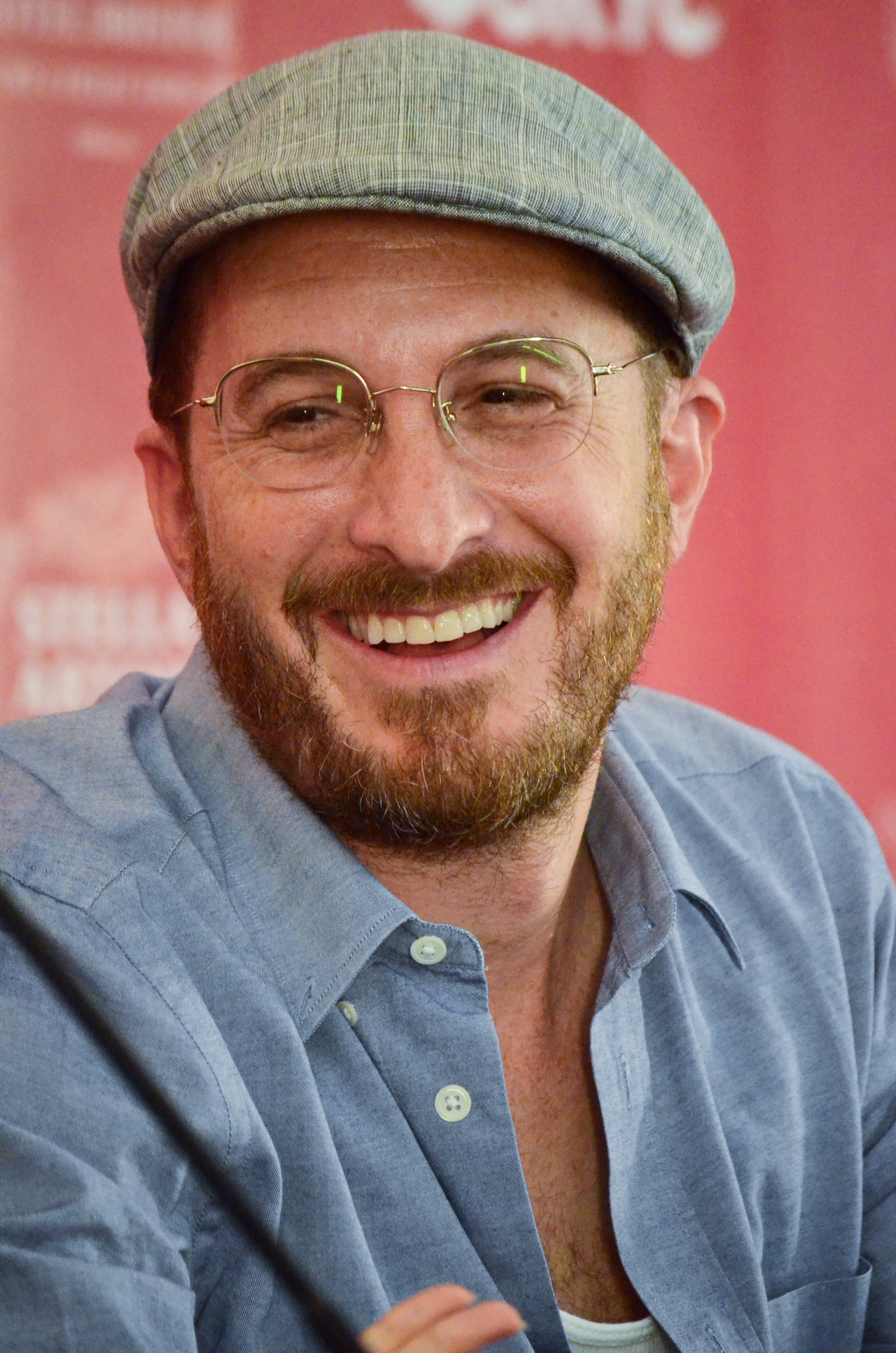
Darren Aronofsky

- February 1
  - Gabriel Batistuta, Argentine footballer
  - Andrew Breitbart, American writer and publisher (d. 2012)
- February 2 – Dambisa Moyo, Baroness Moyo, Zambian-born economist
- February 3 – Retief Goosen, South African golfer
- February 5
  - Bobby Brown, African-American singer
  - Michael Sheen, Welsh actor
- February 6 – David Hayter, Canadian-American actor, voice actor, screenwriter, director, and producer
- February 7 – Andrew Micallef, Maltese painter and musician
- February 9 – Priyantha Weerasooriya, Sri Lankan police officer and 37th Inspector general
- February 11 – Jennifer Aniston, American actress, director, producer and businesswoman
- February 12
  - Darren Aronofsky, American filmmaker
  - Hong Myung-bo, South Korean footballer
- February 13
  - Ahlam, Emirati singer
  - JB Blanc, French voice actor
- February 14 – Adriana Behar, Brazilian volleyball player
- February 15
  - Roberto Balado, Cuban boxer (d. 1994)
  - Birdman, American rapper, entertainer, and record producer
- February 21
  - James Dean Bradfield, Welsh singer-songwriter
  - Bosson, Swedish singer-songwriter
  - Petra Kronberger, Austrian alpine skier
  - Tony Meola, American soccer player
- February 23
  - Michael Campbell, New Zealand golfer
  - Marc Wauters, Belgian cyclist
- February 28 – Robert Sean Leonard, American actor

=== March ===
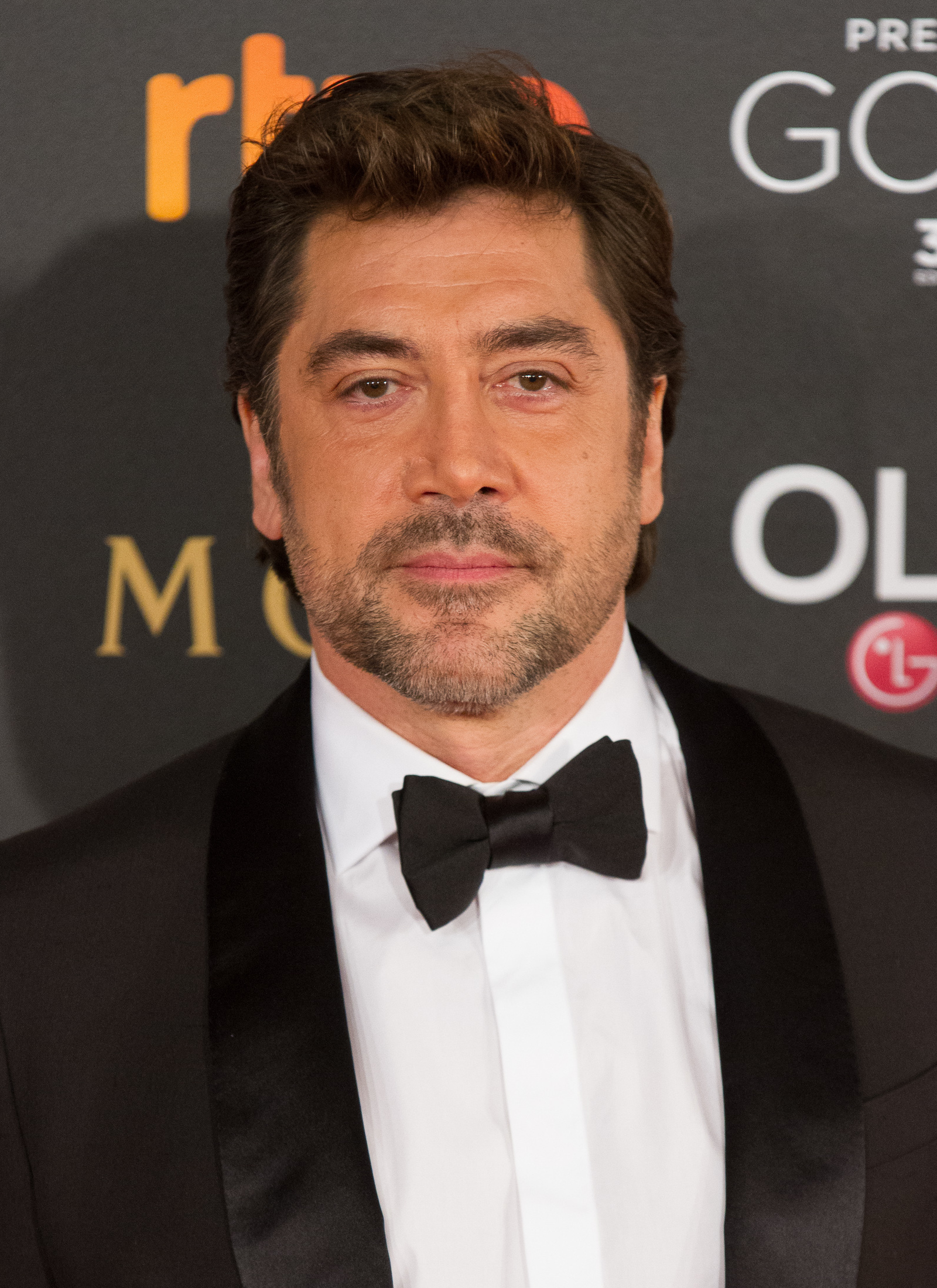
Javier Bardem

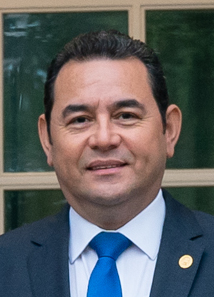
Jimmy Morales

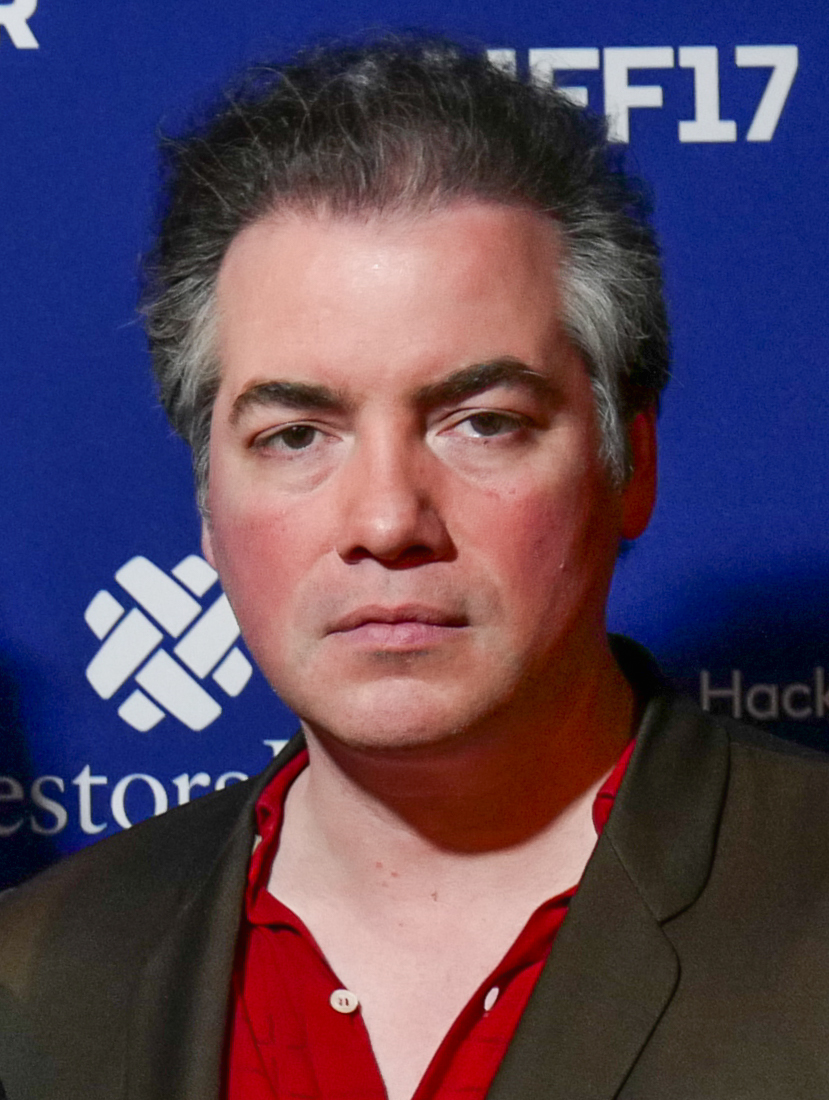
Kevin Corrigan

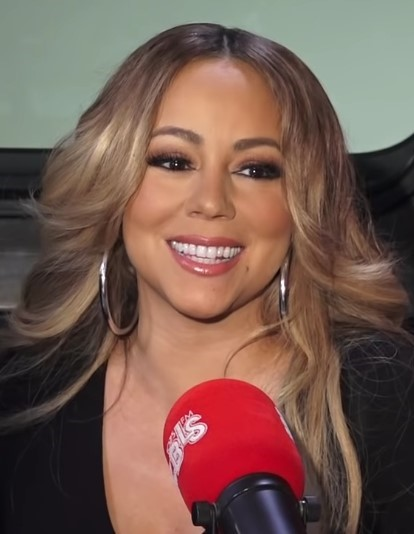
Mariah Carey

- March 1 – Javier Bardem, Spanish actor
- March 4
  - Annie Yi, Taiwanese actress
  - Patrick Roach, Canadian actor
- March 7 – Brian Jamieson, American rower
- March 10 – Paget Brewster, American actress
- March 11
  - Terrence Howard, American actor and singer
  - Soraya, Colombian singer and multi-instrumentalist (d. 2006)
- March 12
  - Graham Coxon, English singer-songwriter, multi-instrumentalist and painter
  - Akemi Okamura, Japanese voice actress
- March 13 – Susanna Mälkki, Finnish conductor
- March 15
  - Kim Raver, American actress
  - Timo Kotipelto, Finnish musician
  - Yutaka Take, Japanese jockey
- March 16 – Markus Lanz, German-Italian television presenter
- March 17 – Alexander McQueen, British fashion designer (d. 2010)
- March 18
  - Vasyl Ivanchuk, Ukrainian chess grandmaster
  - Jimmy Morales, Guatemalan politician, 37th President of Guatemala
- March 21 – Ali Daei, Iranian football player
- March 22 – Tony Fadell, American engineer, inventor, designer and entrepreneur (Nest Labs, Apple Inc)
- March 24 – Stephan Eberharter, Austrian alpine skier
- March 25 – Jeffrey Walker, British musician
- March 26 – Suroosh Alvi, Canadian journalist and filmmaker
- March 27
  - Mariah Carey, American pop singer
  - Kevin Corrigan, American actor
  - Pauley Perrette, American actress
- March 28 – Rodney Atkins, American country music singer
- March 29 – Chiaki Ishikawa, Japanese singer (See-Saw)

=== April ===
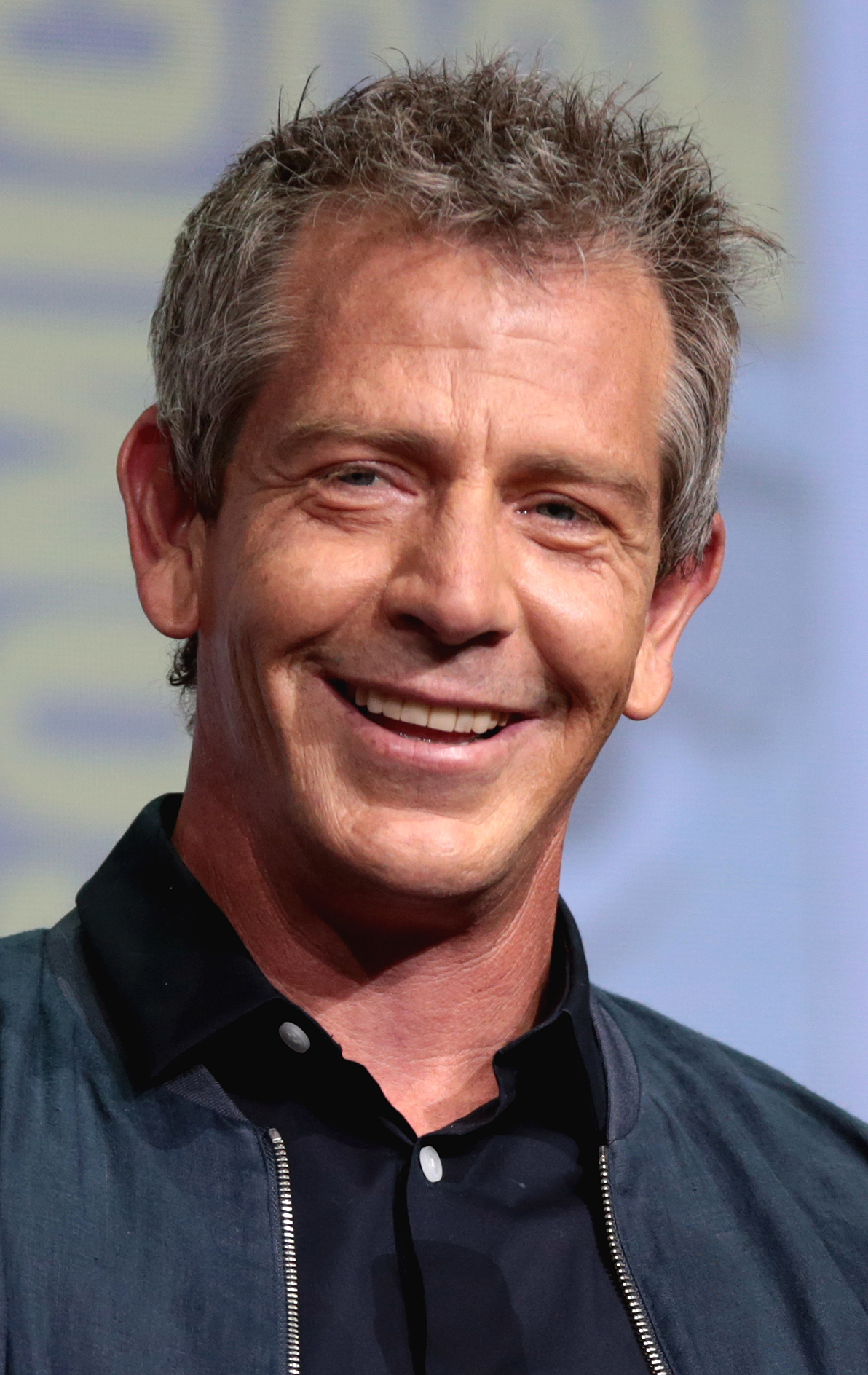
Ben Mendelsohn

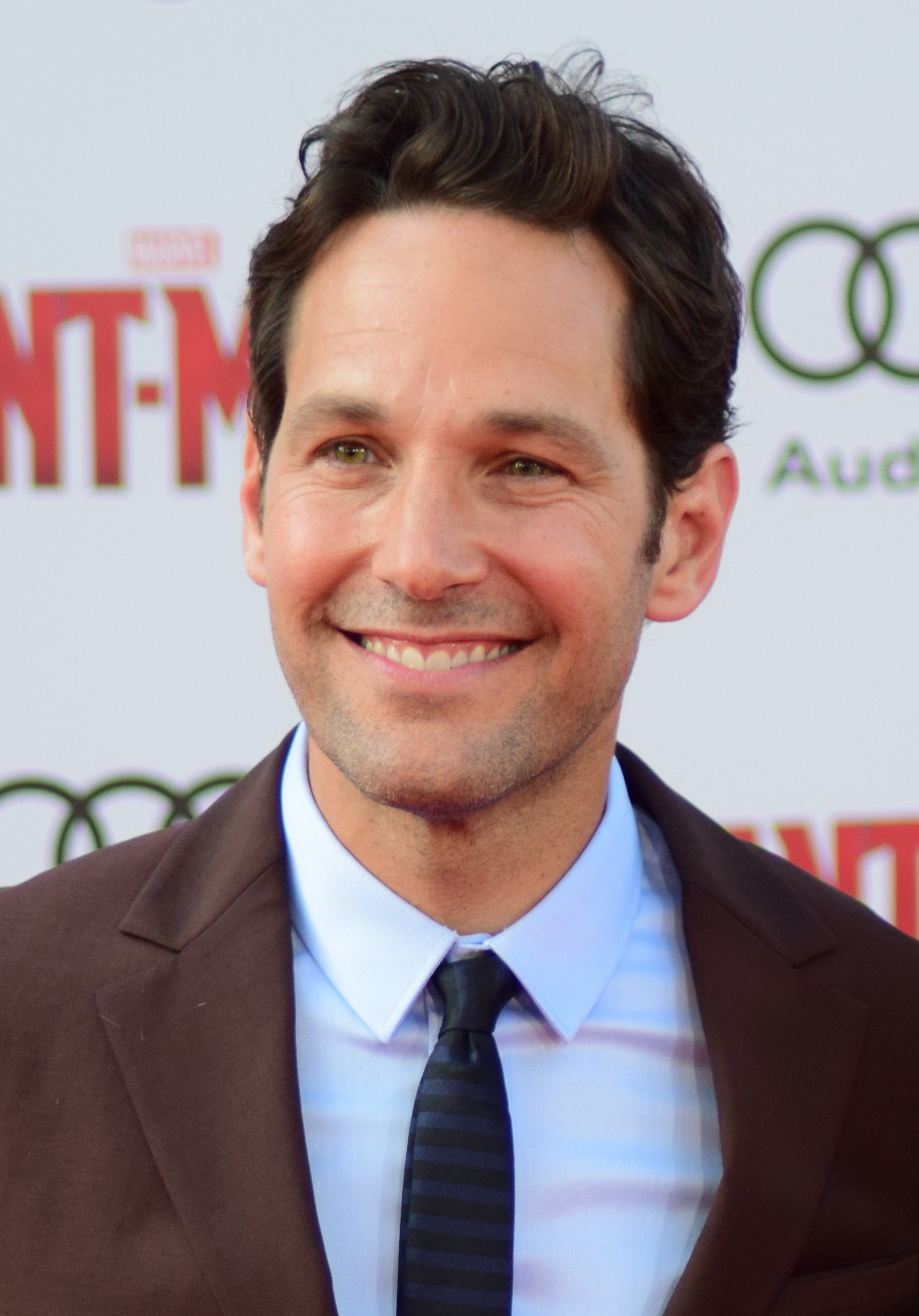
Paul Rudd

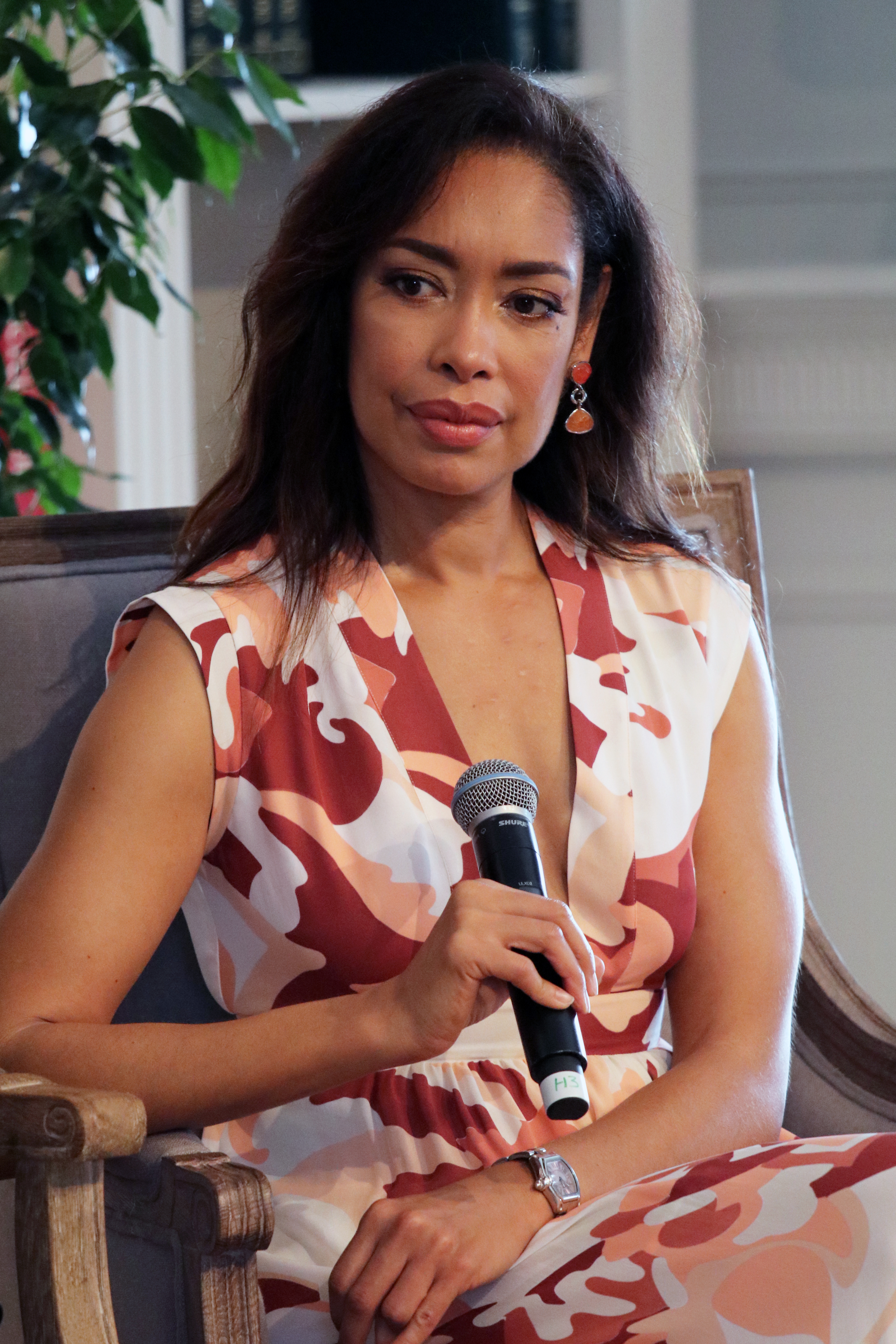
Gina Torres

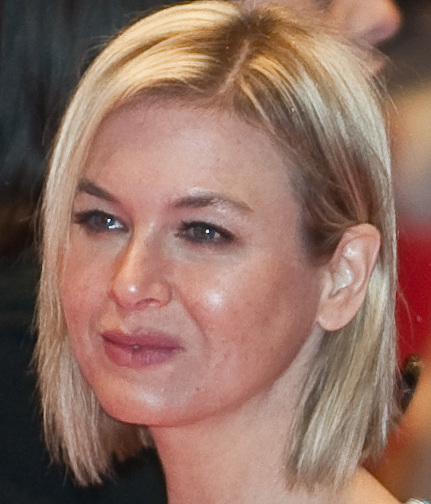
Renée Zellweger

- April 1
  - Fadl Shaker, Lebanese singer
  - Andrew Vlahov, Australian basketball player
- April 2 – Ajay Devgn, Indian actor, director and producer
- April 3
  - Ben Mendelsohn, Australian actor
  - Lance Storm, Canadian professional wrestler
- April 6 – Paul Rudd, American actor, comedian, writer and producer
- April 11
  - Cerys Matthews, Welsh singer
  - Caren Miosga, German journalist and television presenter
  - Chisato Moritaka, Japanese singer
- April 18
  - Shannon Lee, Chinese-American actress
  - Susan Polgár, Hungarian chess player
- April 21 – Toby Stephens, English actor
- April 23 – Yelena Shushunova, Soviet gymnast (d. 2018)
- April 25
  - Vanessa Beecroft, Italian artist
  - Gina Torres, American actress
  - Renée Zellweger, American Academy Award-winning actress and producer
- April 27
  - Cory Booker, American pooitician, U.S. Senator from New Jersey
  - Stas Mikhaylov, Russian singer and songwriter

=== May ===
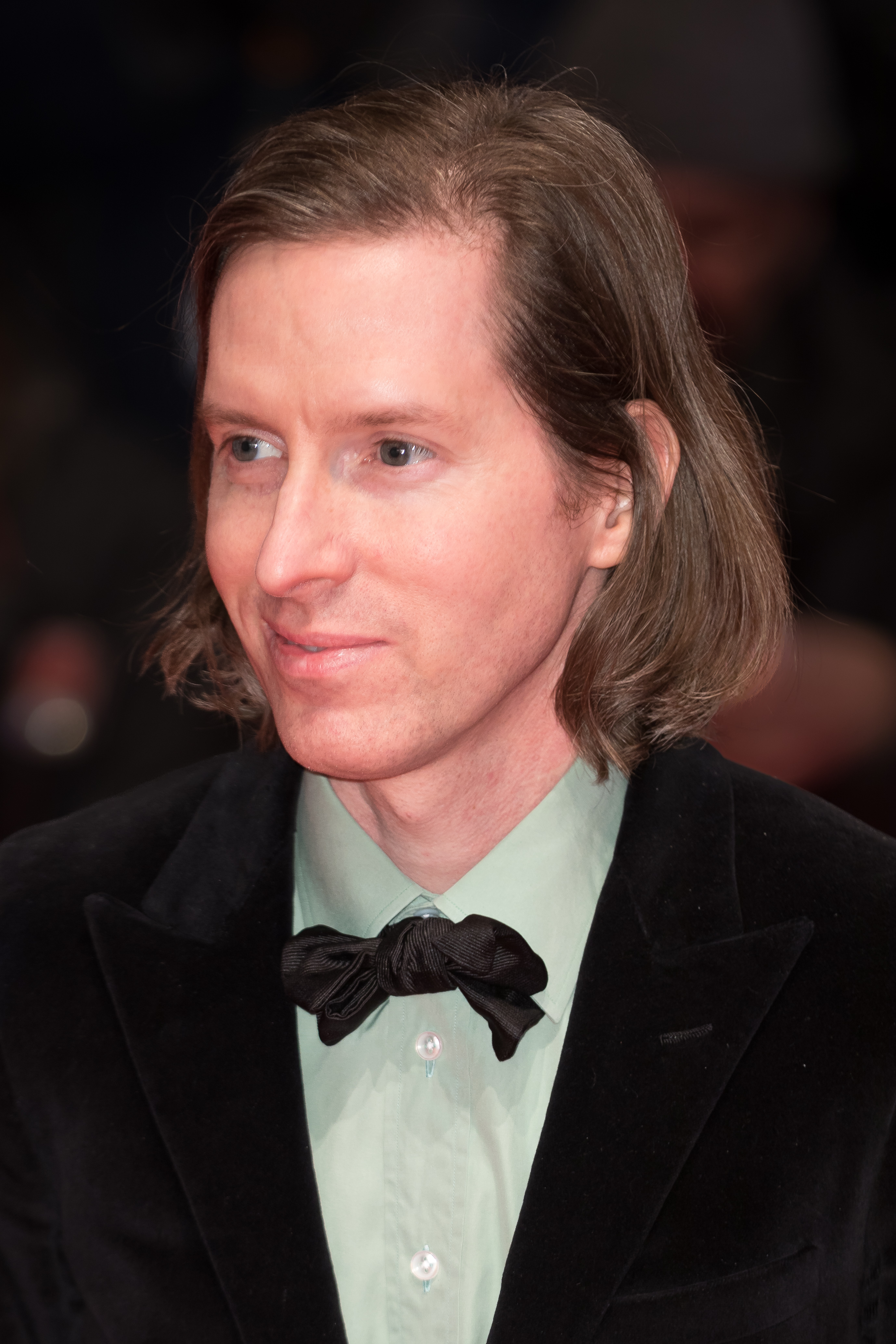
Wes Anderson

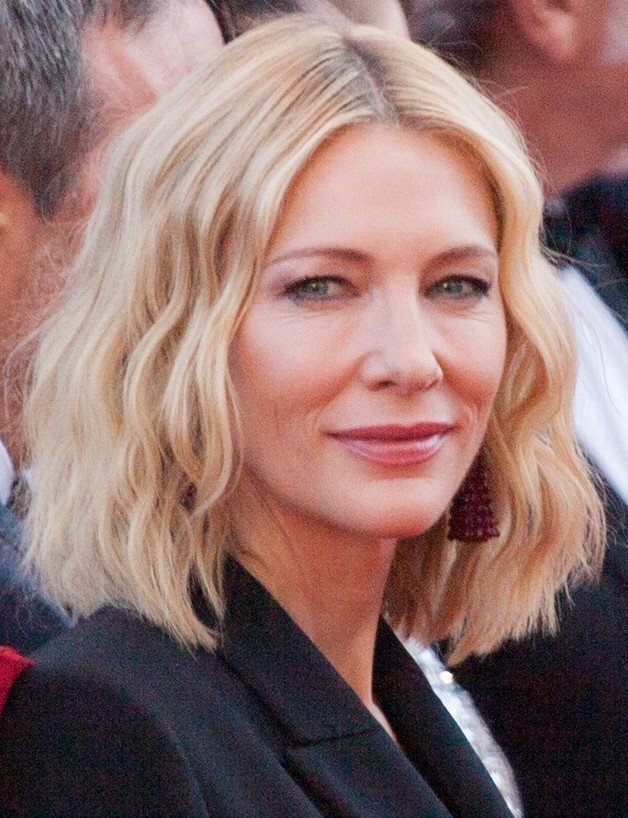
Cate Blanchett

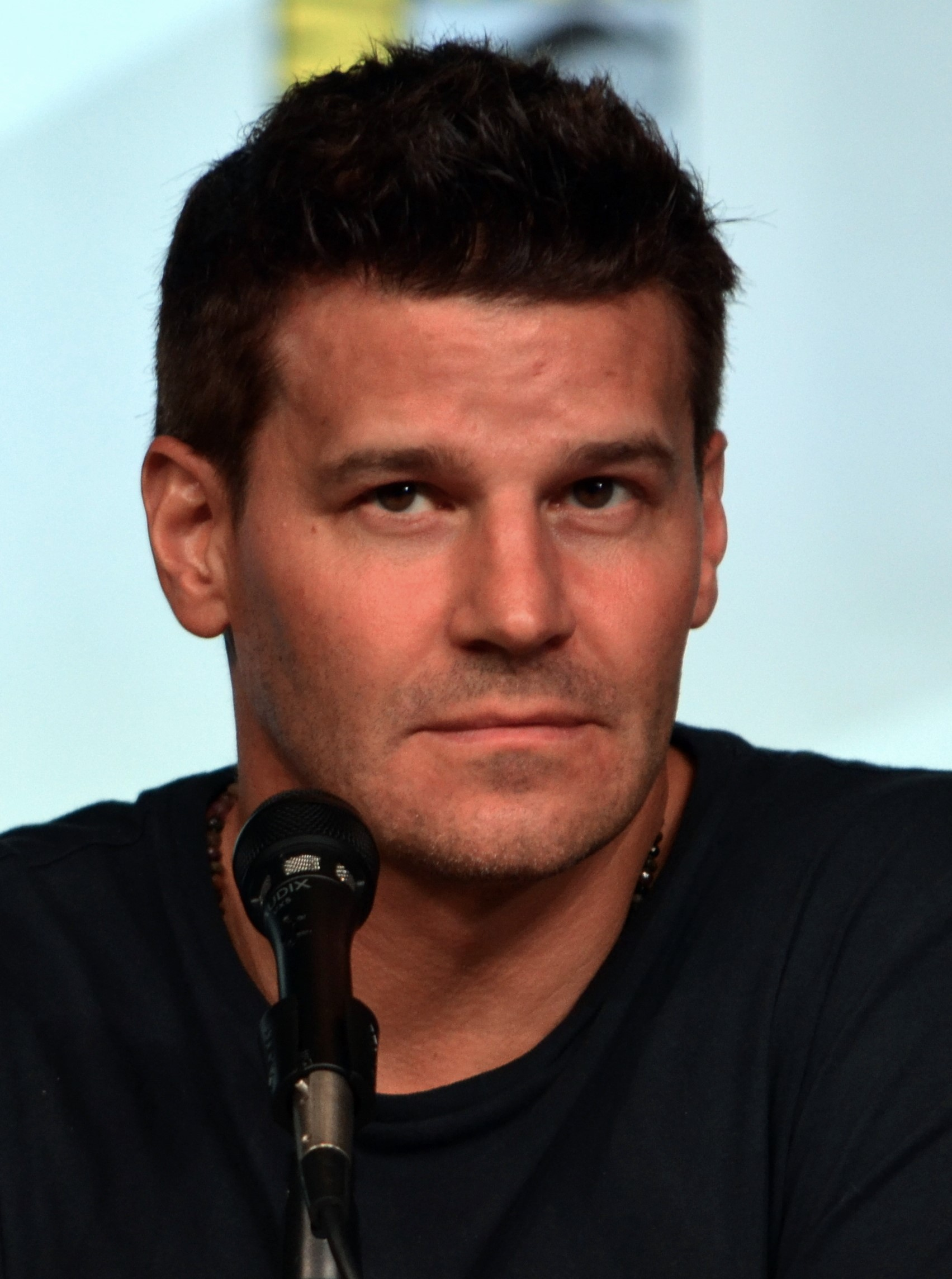
David Boreanaz

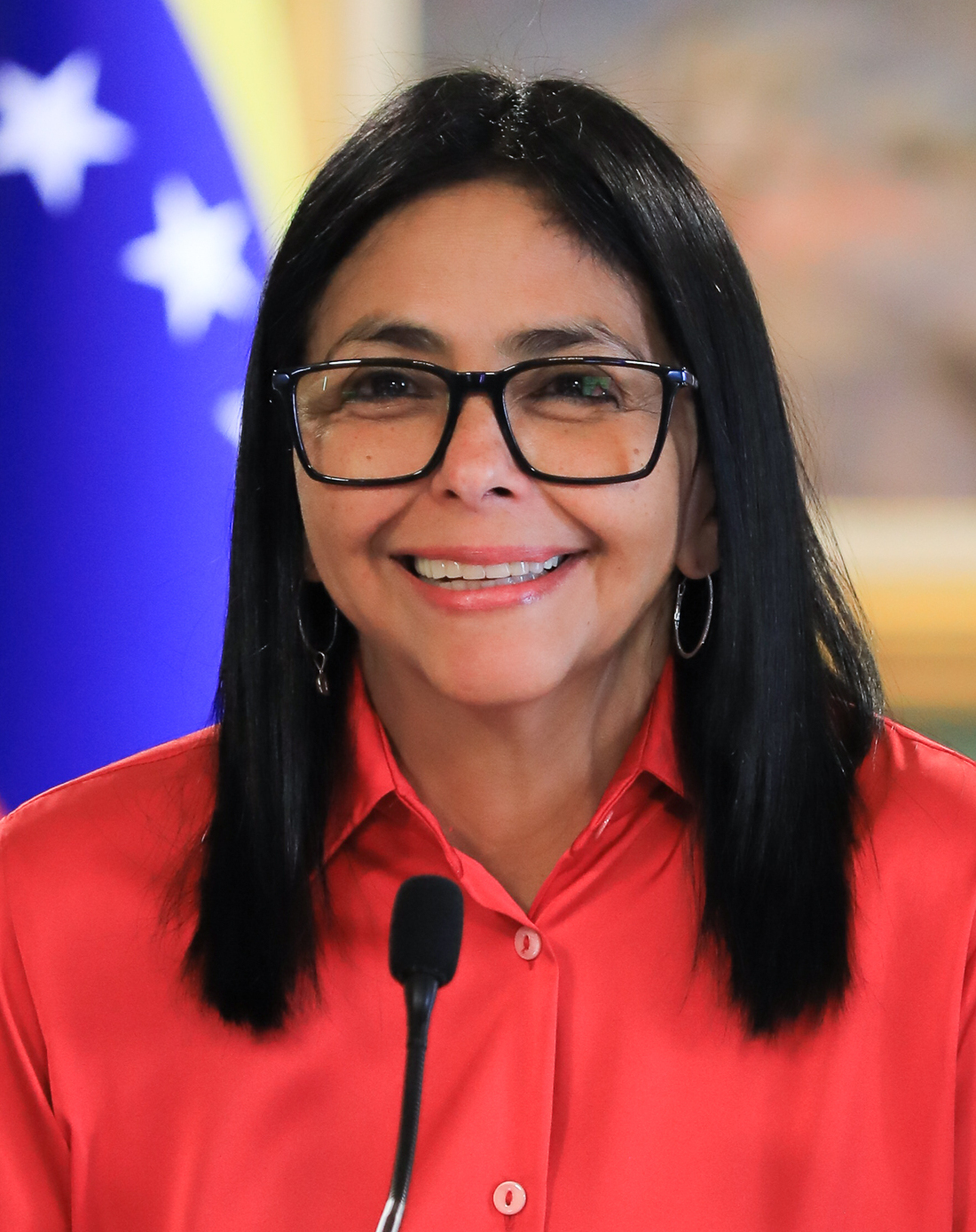
Delcy Rodríguez

- May 1 – Wes Anderson, American filmmaker
- May 2
  - Brian Lara, Trinidadian cricketer.
  - Corinna Schumacher, German animal rights activist and accomplished horse rider
- May 4 – Rabindra Prasad Adhikari, Nepalese politician (d. 2019)
- May 5 – Hideki Irabu, Japanese baseball player (d. 2011)
- May 6 – Jim Magilton, Northern Irish footballer
- May 7 – Katerina Maleeva, Bulgarian tennis player
- May 9 – Amber, German musician
- May 10 – Dennis Bergkamp, Dutch footballer
- May 13
  - Nikos Aliagas, French-born television host
  - Brian Carroll (aka Buckethead), American guitarist
- May 14 – Cate Blanchett, Australian actress
- May 16
  - David Boreanaz, American actor
  - Tucker Carlson, American political commentator
  - Steve Lewis, American athlete
- May 18 – Delcy Rodríguez, Venezuelan politician, Interim President of Venezuela (2026–present)
- May 19 – Teresa Ribera, Spanish politician
- May 21 – Georgiy Gongadze, Ukrainian journalist (d. 2000)
- May 25 – Hassan de Zé Cocá, Brazilian politician
- May 26 – Siri Lindley, American triathlete
- May 28 – Rob Ford, Canadian politician, 64th Mayor of Toronto (d. 2016)

=== June ===
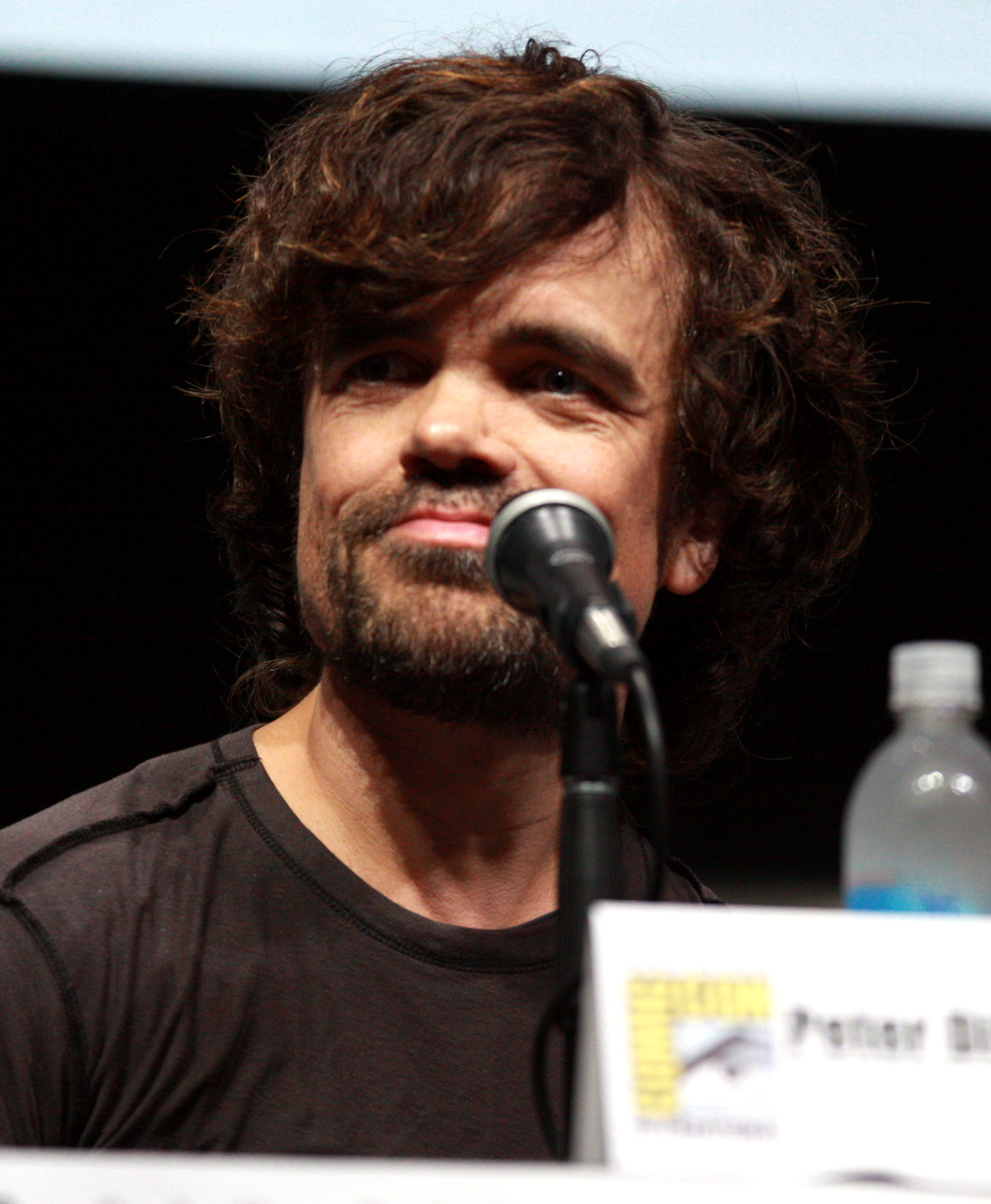
Peter Dinklage

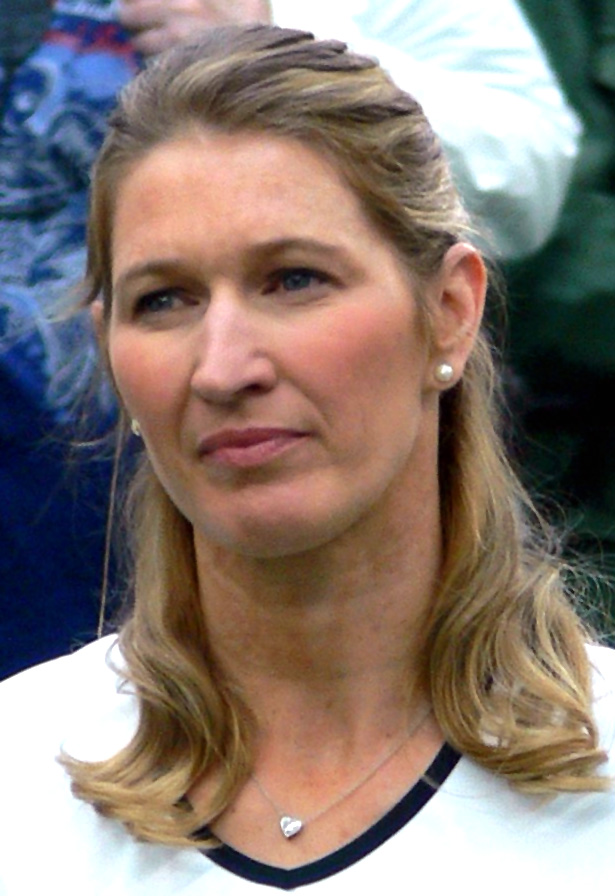
Steffi Graf

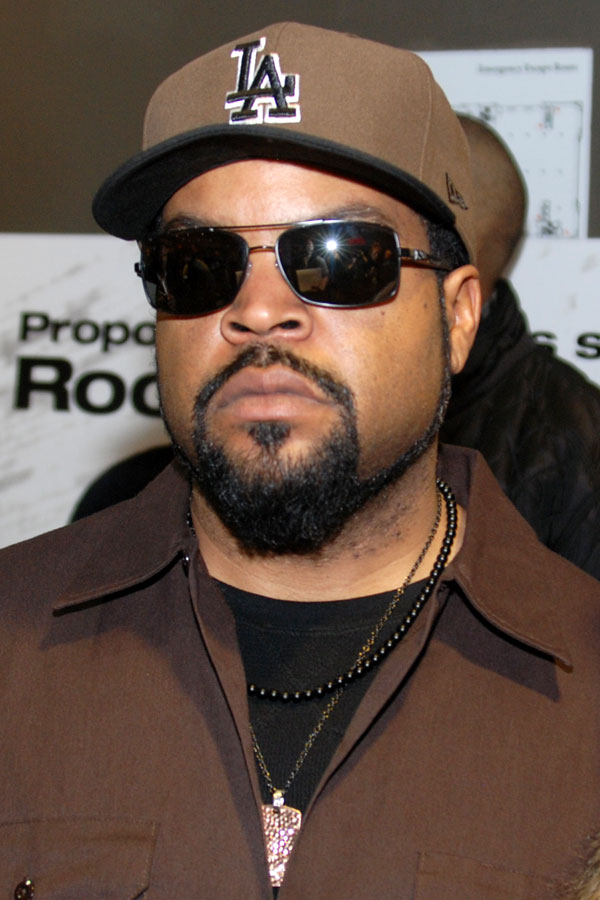
Ice Cube

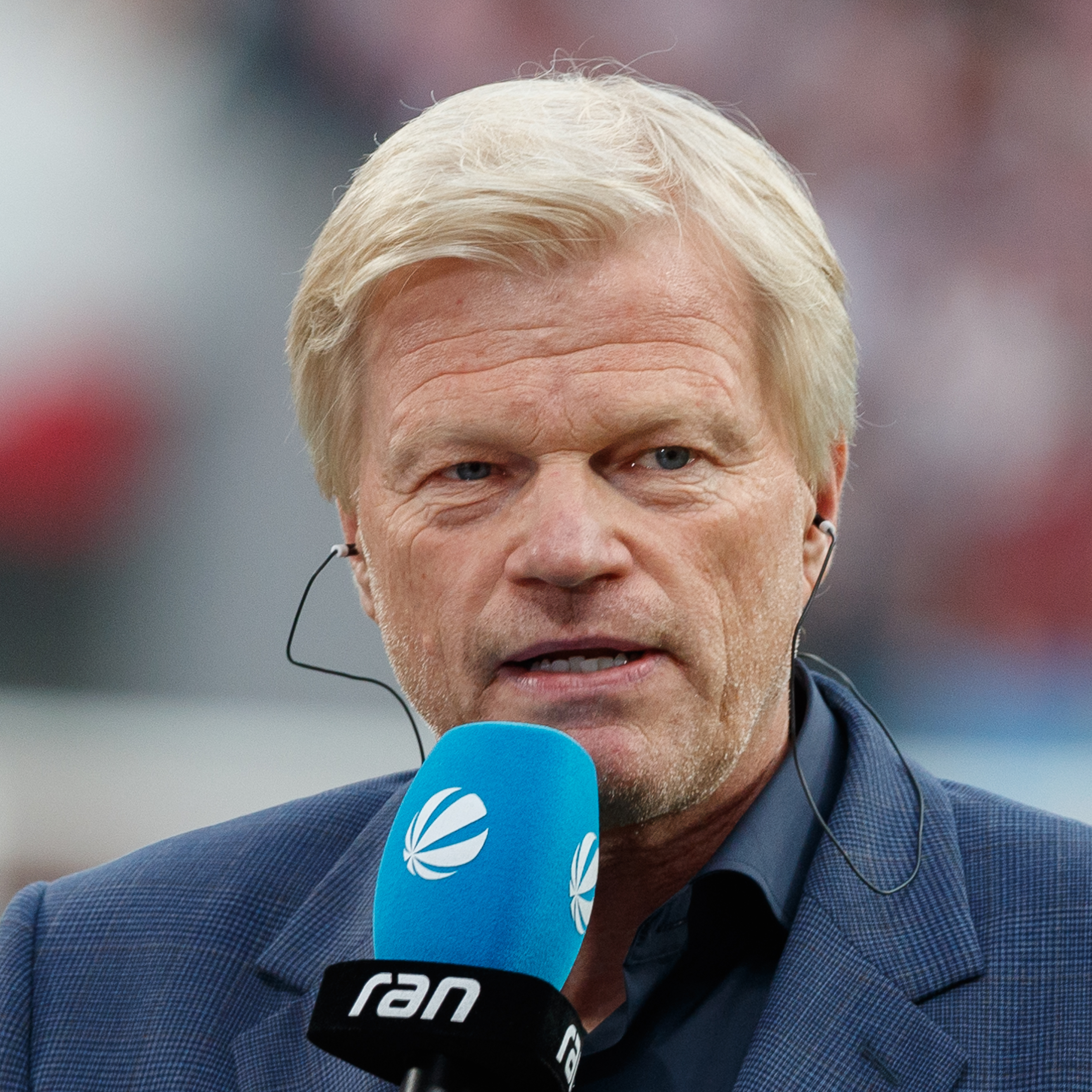
Oliver Kahn

- June 3 – Takako Minekawa, Japanese musician, composer and writer
- June 4 – Rob Huebel, American comedian
- June 5 – Brian McKnight, American musician
- June 7
  - Alina Astafei, Romanian-German high jumper
  - Prince Joachim of Denmark
  - Kim Rhodes, American actress
- June 8 – J. P. Manoux, American actor
- June 11
  - Peter Dinklage, American actor
  - Steven Drozd, American rock drummer
  - Anatoliy Povedenok, Kazakh football player
- June 12
  - Zsolt Daczi, Hungarian rock guitarist (d. 2007)
  - Heinz-Christian Strache, Austrian politician
- June 13 – Søren Rasted, Danish musician
- June 14
  - Eugene Chung, Korean-American football player
  - Steffi Graf, German tennis player
- June 15
  - Ice Cube, African-American rapper and actor
  - Oliver Kahn, German football goalkeeper
  - Jansher Khan, Pakistani squash player
- June 16 – MC Ren, American rapper
- June 17 – Paul Tergat, Kenyan athlete
- June 18 – Haki Doku, Albanian para-cyclist
- June 19 – Trine Pallesen, Danish actress
- June 20
  - Alexander Schallenberg, current Chancellor of Austria
  - Paulo Bento, Portuguese football player and coach
- June 23
  - Noa, Israeli singer
  - Fernanda Ribeiro, Portuguese long-distance runner
- June 24
  - Sissel Kyrkjebø, Norwegian singer
  - Nicodemo Gentile, Italian lawyer and TV personality
- June 30 – Sanath Jayasuriya, Sri Lankan cricketer

=== July ===
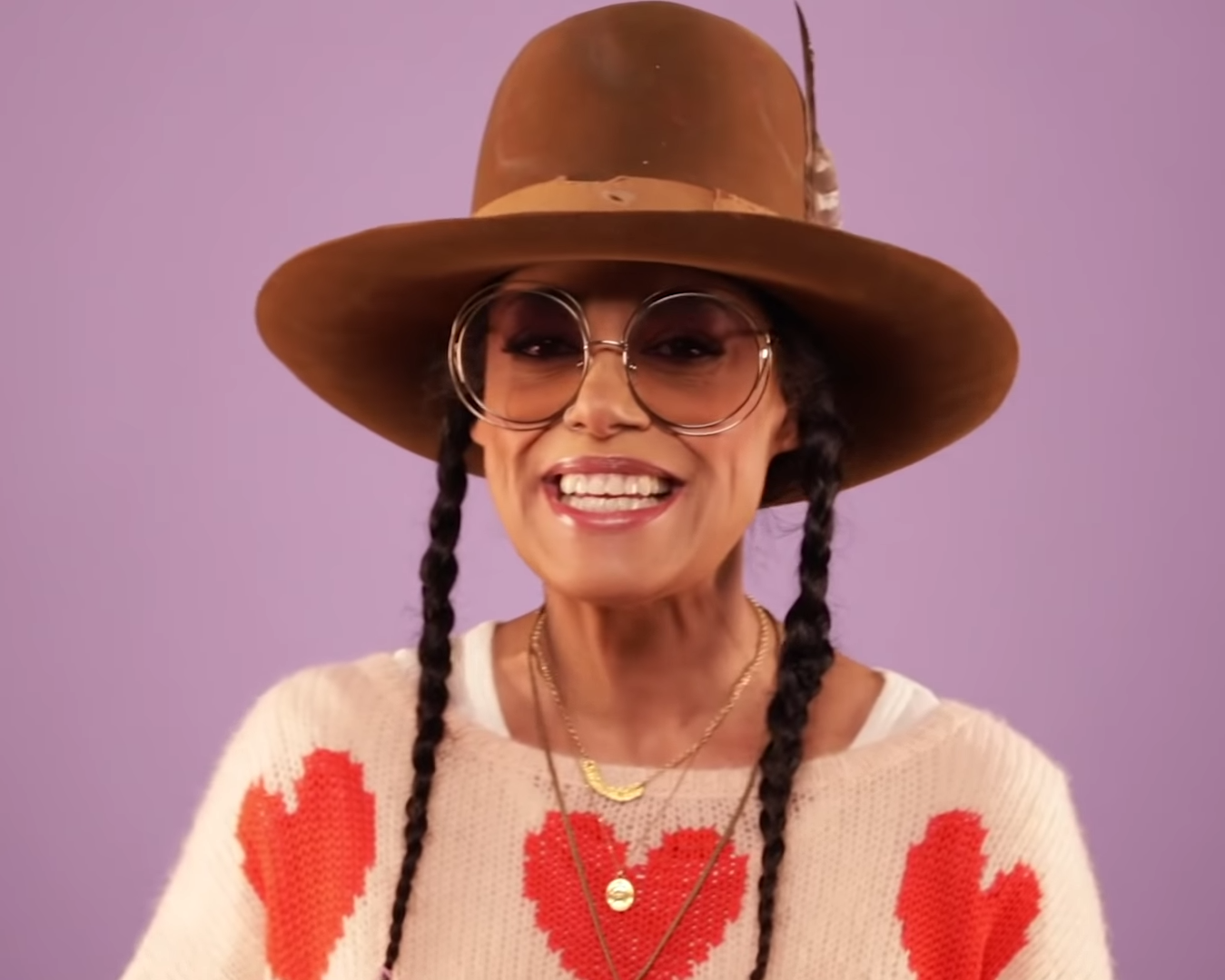
Cree Summer

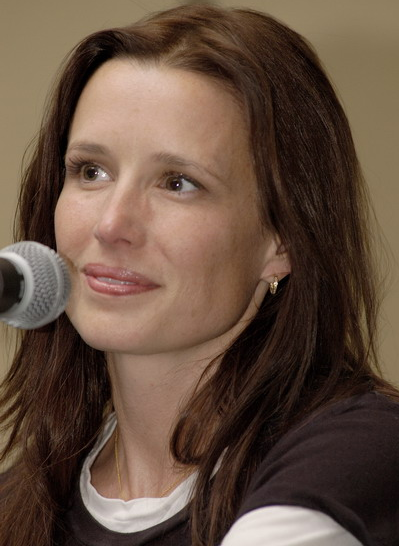
Shawnee Smith

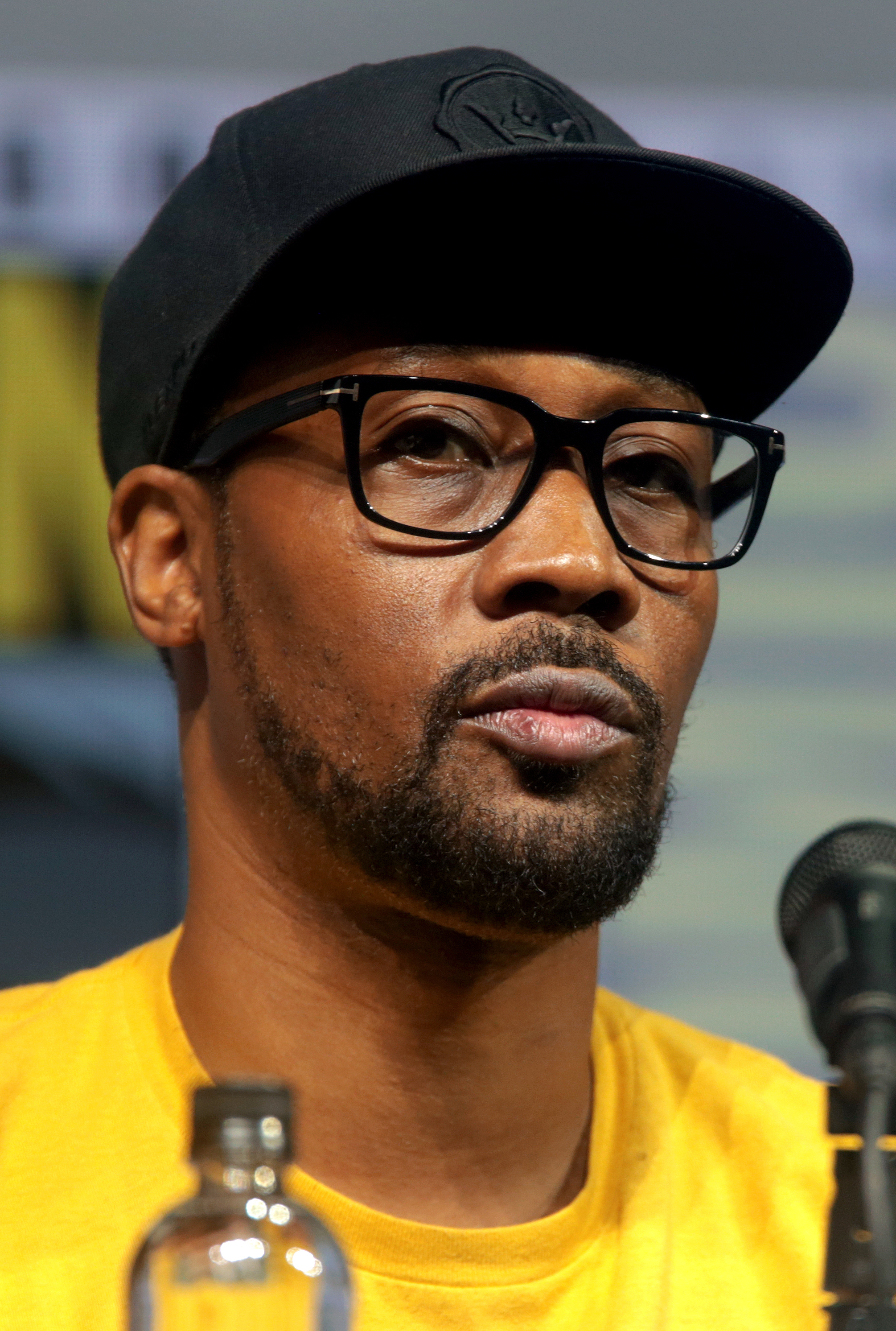
RZA

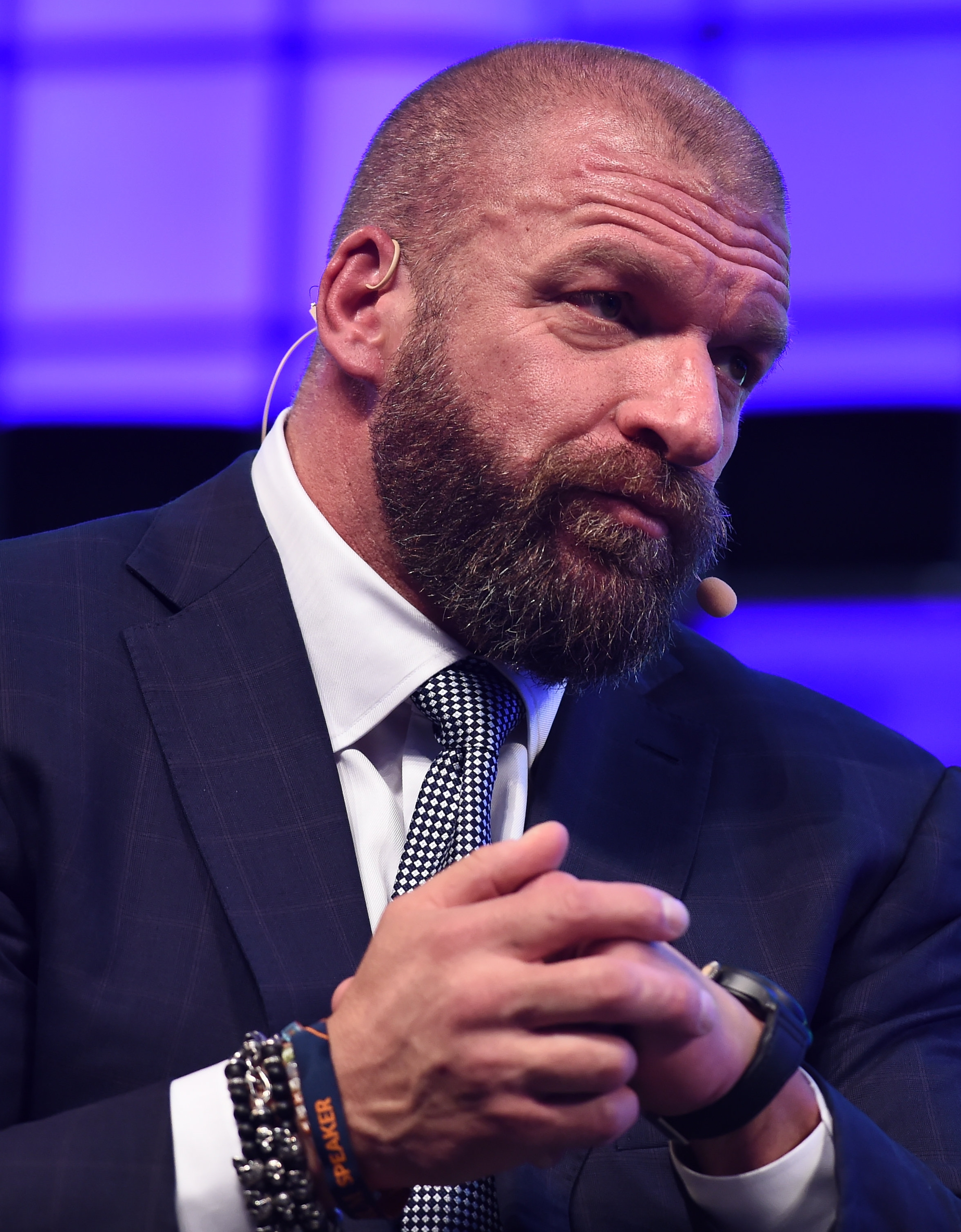
Triple H

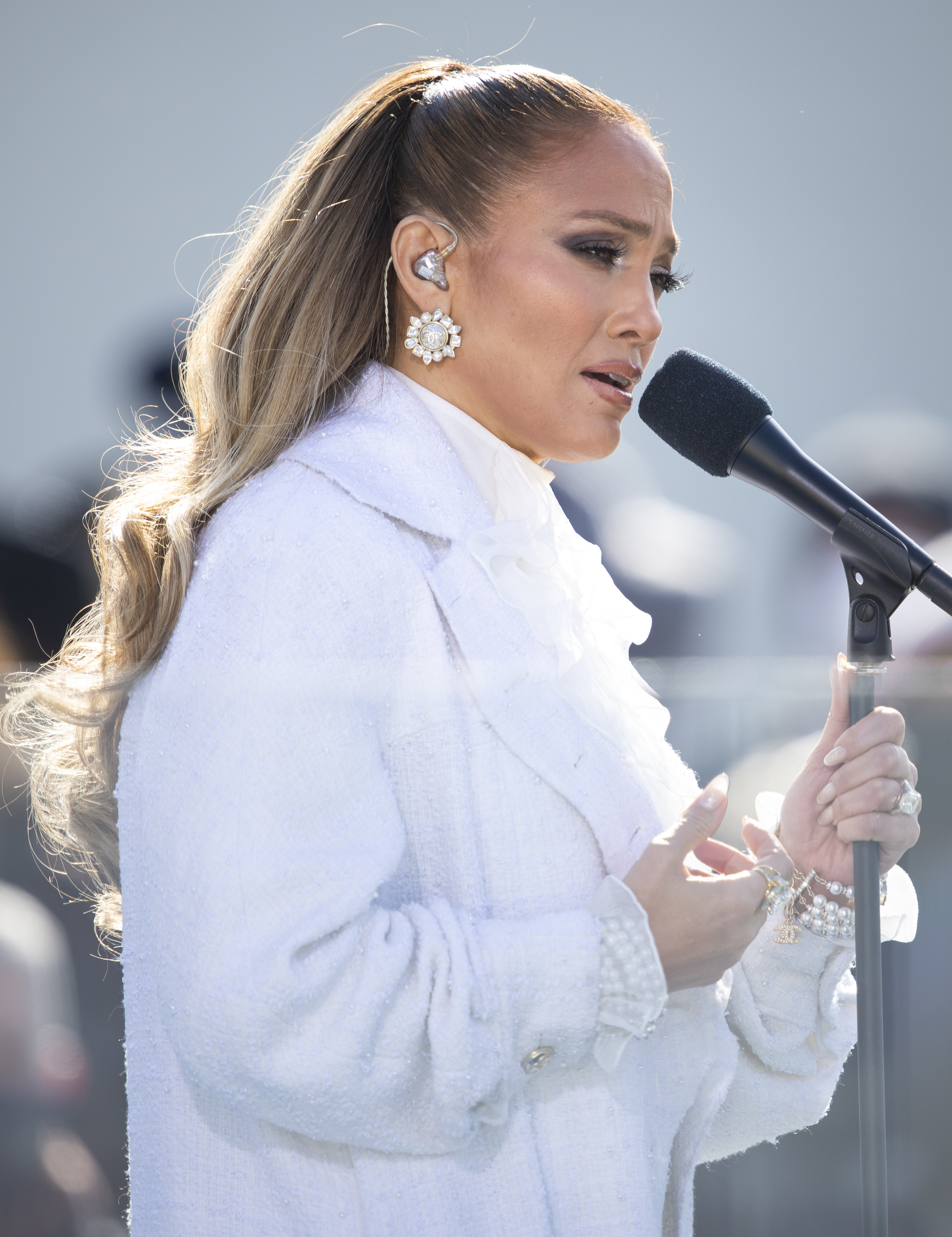
Jennifer Lopez

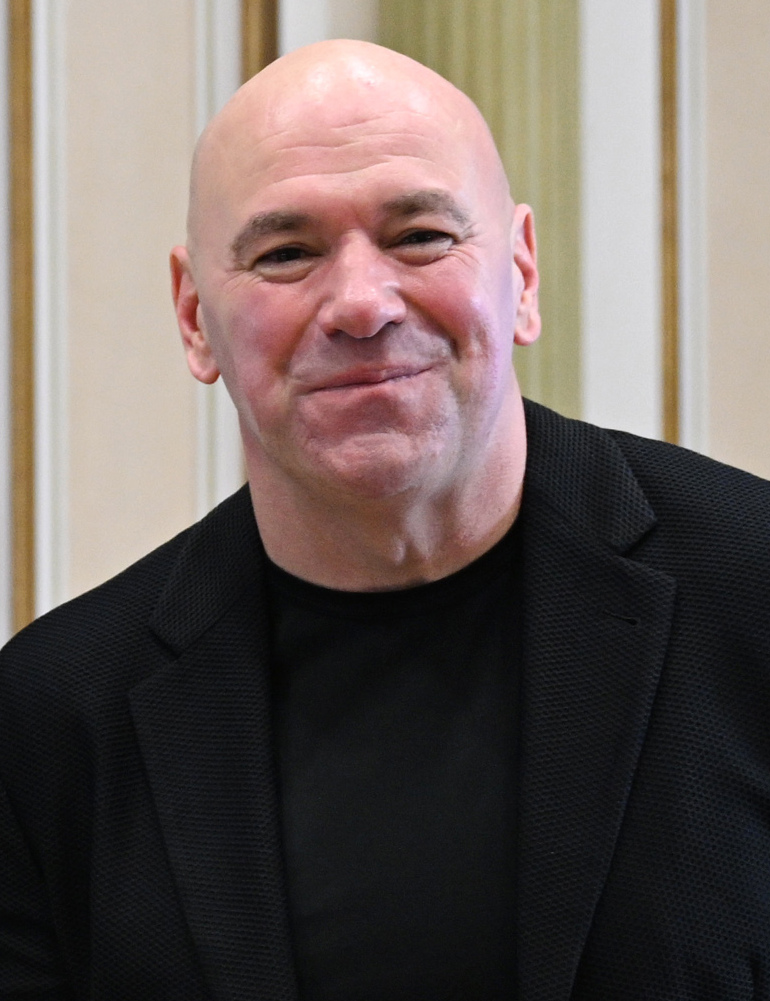
Dana White

- July 2 – Jenni Rivera, Mexican-American singer-songwriter, producer and actress (d. 2012)
- July 3
  - Gedeon Burkhard, German actor
  - Shawnee Smith, American actress
- July 5
  - John LeClair, American hockey player
  - RZA, American rapper and record producer
- July 7
  - Sylke Otto, German luger
  - Joe Sakic, Canadian hockey player
  - Cree Summer, American-Canadian actress and singer
- July 8 – Sugizo, Japanese guitarist and singer
- July 9
  - Munkhbayar Dorjsuren, Mongolian-German sport shooter
  - Agnieszka Kłopotek, Polish politician and zootechnician
- July 10
  - Hossan Leong, Singaporean stage and screen actor, television host, radio deejay and comedian
  - Jonas Kaufmann, German operatic tenor
  - Rami Makhlouf, Syrian businessman
- July 11 – David Tao, Taiwanese singer-songwriter
- July 16
  - Björn Dunkerbeck, Danish windsurfer
  - Sahra Wagenknecht, German politician
- July 17
  - Jason Clarke, Australian actor
  - Ravi Kishan, Indian actor
  - Kazuki Kitamura, Japanese actor
- July 18 – The Great Sasuke, Japanese wrestler
- July 20
  - Josh Holloway, American actor
  - Johnny Ngauamo, Tonga rugby union player
- July 21
  - Avraam Russo, Russian singer
  - Isabell Werth, German equestrian
- July 22
  - Jason Becker, American heavy metal guitarist, formerly of Cacophony
  - James Arnold Taylor, American voice actor
  - Despina Vandi, Greek singer
- July 23 – Raphael Warnock, American pastor and junior senator from Georgia
- July 24 – Jennifer Lopez, American actress and singer
- July 25 – Annastacia Palaszczuk, Australian politician, Premier of Queensland
- July 26 – Tanni Grey-Thompson, born Carys Grey, British Paralympian
- July 27
  - Dacian Cioloș, 64th Prime Minister of Romania
  - Bryan Fuller, American writer, producer, and director
  - Pavel Hapal, Czech footballer
  - Jonty Rhodes, South African cricketer
  - Triple H, American wrestler
- July 28
  - Michael Amott, Swedish guitarist and songwriter
  - Alexis Arquette, American actress, cabaret performer, underground cartoonist, and activist (d. 2016)
  - Dana White, American businessman and president of Ultimate Fighting Championship
- July 30 – Simon Baker, Australian-American actor and director
- July 31 – Antonio Conte, Italian football player and manager

=== August ===
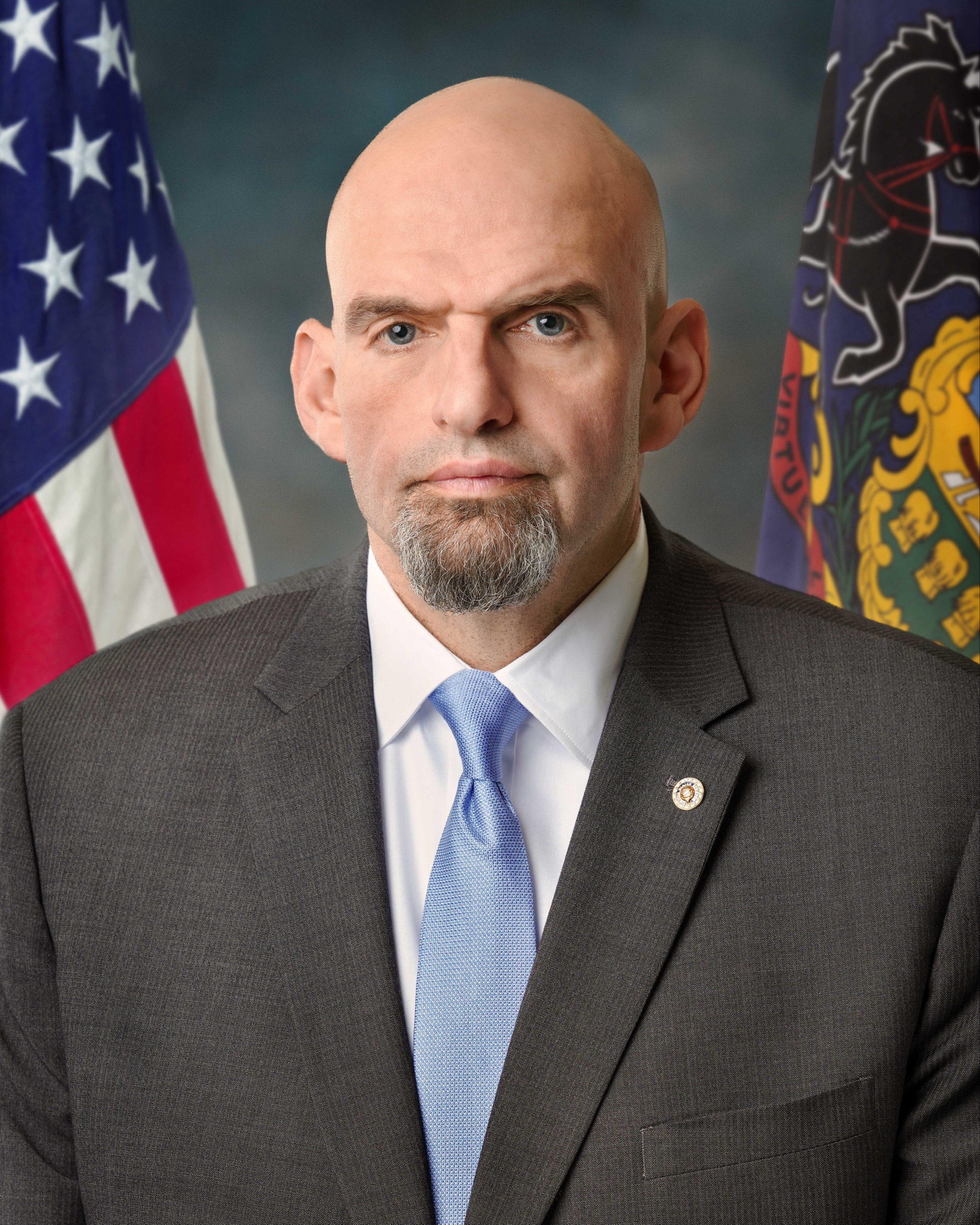
John Fetterman

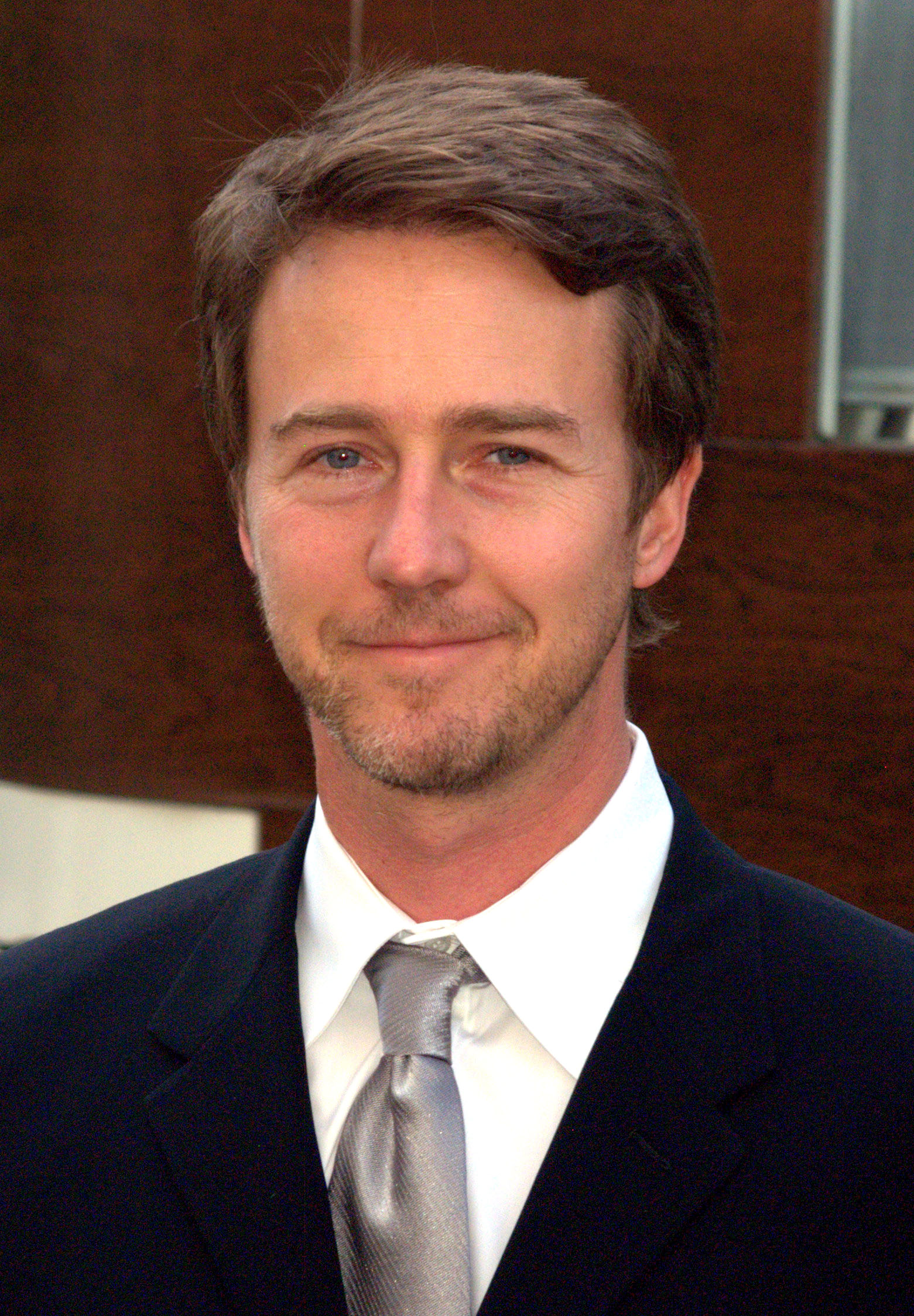
Edward Norton

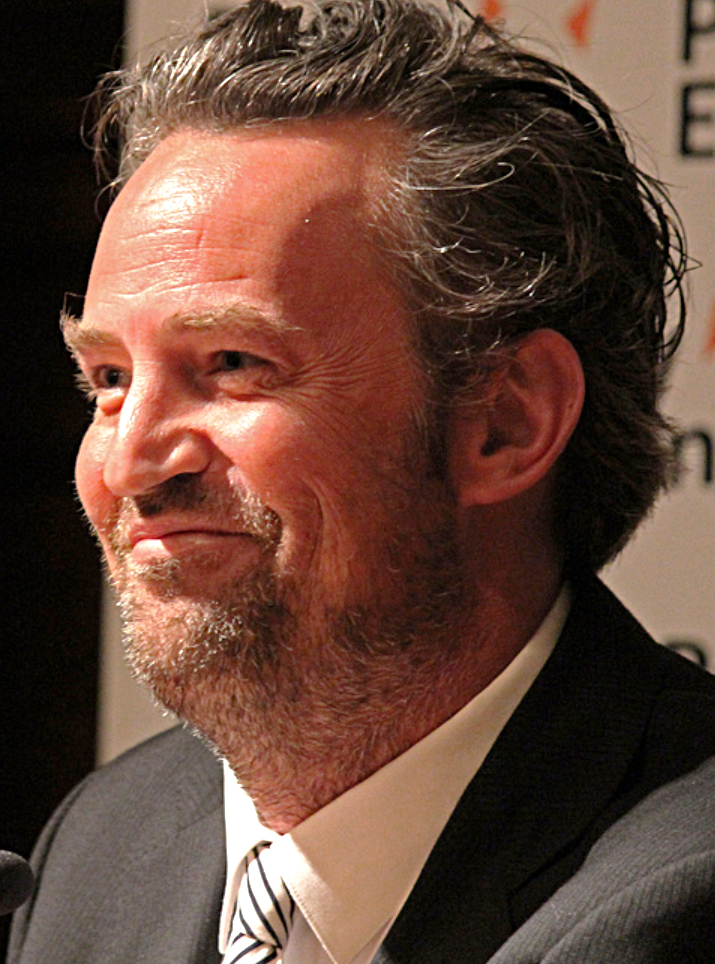
Matthew Perry

- August 1 – Graham Thorpe, English cricketer (d. 2024)
- August 2
  - Jan Axel Blomberg, Norwegian drummer
  - Fernando Couto, Portuguese footballer
- August 4 – Max Cavalera, Brazilian musician and singer (Soulfly, Cavalera Conspiracy, ex-Sepultura)
- August 6 – Elliott Smith, American musician (d. 2003)
- August 8 – Faye Wong, Hong Kong singer and actress
- August 10
  - Brian Drummond, Canadian voice actor
  - Emily Symons, Australian actress
- August 11 – Vanderlei de Lima, Brazilian long-distance runner
- August 12 – Tanita Tikaram, German-born British singer-songwriter
- August 13 – Midori Ito, Japanese figure skater
- August 14 – Chris Pérez, American guitarist
- August 15
  - Kevin Cheng, Hong Kong television actor and singer
  - John Fetterman, American politician, Senator of Pennsylvania
- August 17
  - Uhm Jung-hwa, South Korean singer and actress
  - Christian Laettner, American professional basketball player
  - Donnie Wahlberg, American singer and actor (New Kids on the Block)
- August 18
  - Edward Norton, American actor, film director, screenwriter, and social activist
  - Christian Slater, American actor and producer
  - Timothy Snyder, American author and historian
- August 19
  - Nate Dogg, African-American rapper (d. 2011)
  - Matthew Perry, American actor (d. 2023)
- August 20 – Santeri Kinnunen, Finnish actor
- August 23 – Jean-Marc Tellier, French politician
- August 28 – Jack Black, American actor and musician
- August 29 – Lucero, Mexican singer and actress

=== September ===
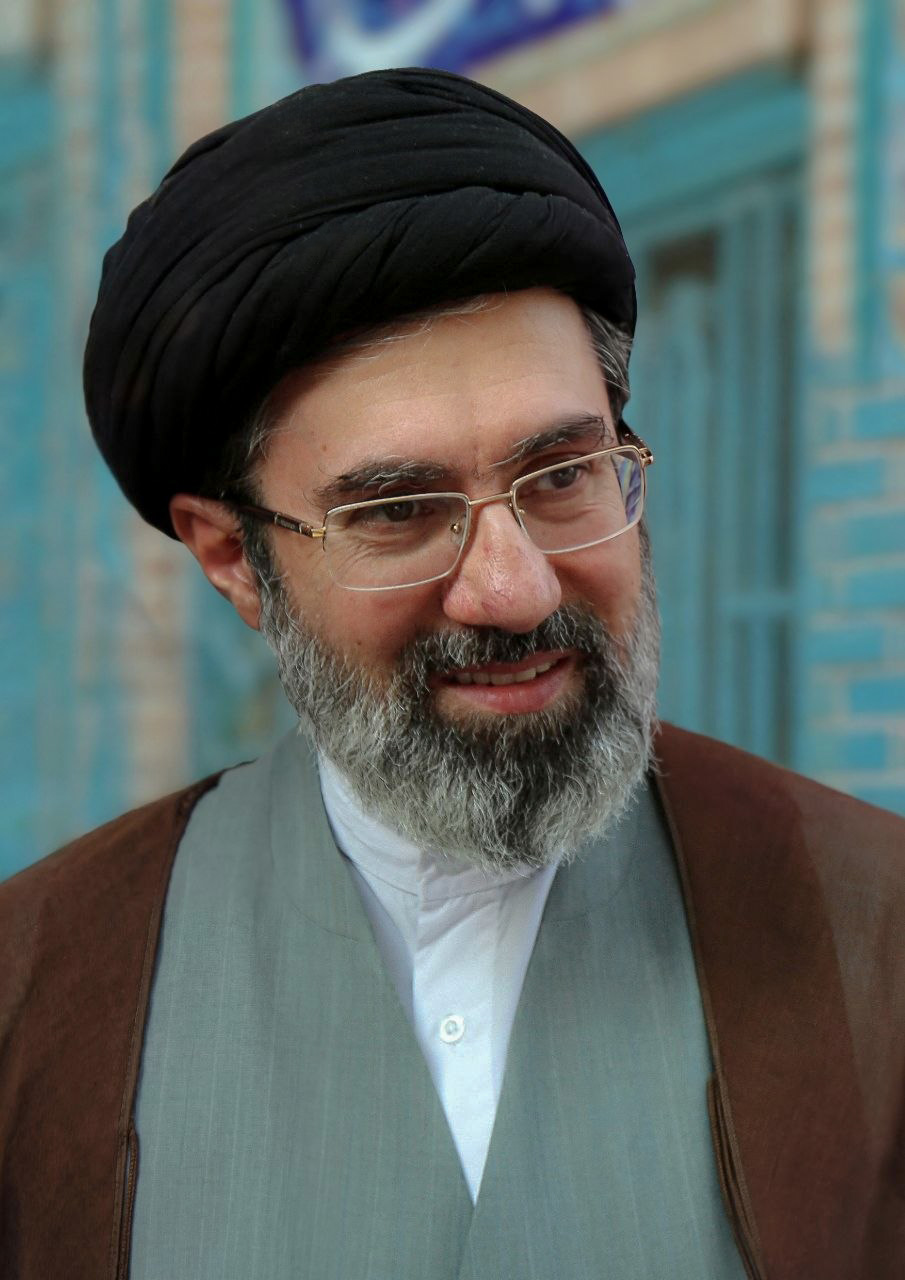
Mojtaba Khamenei

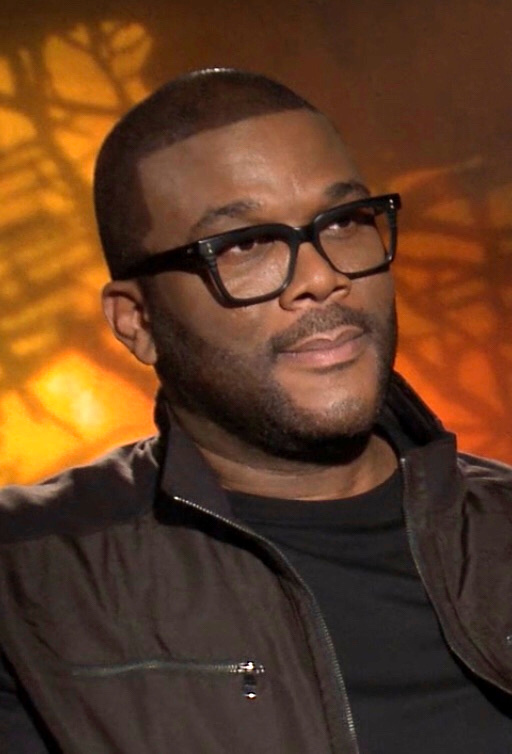
Tyler Perry

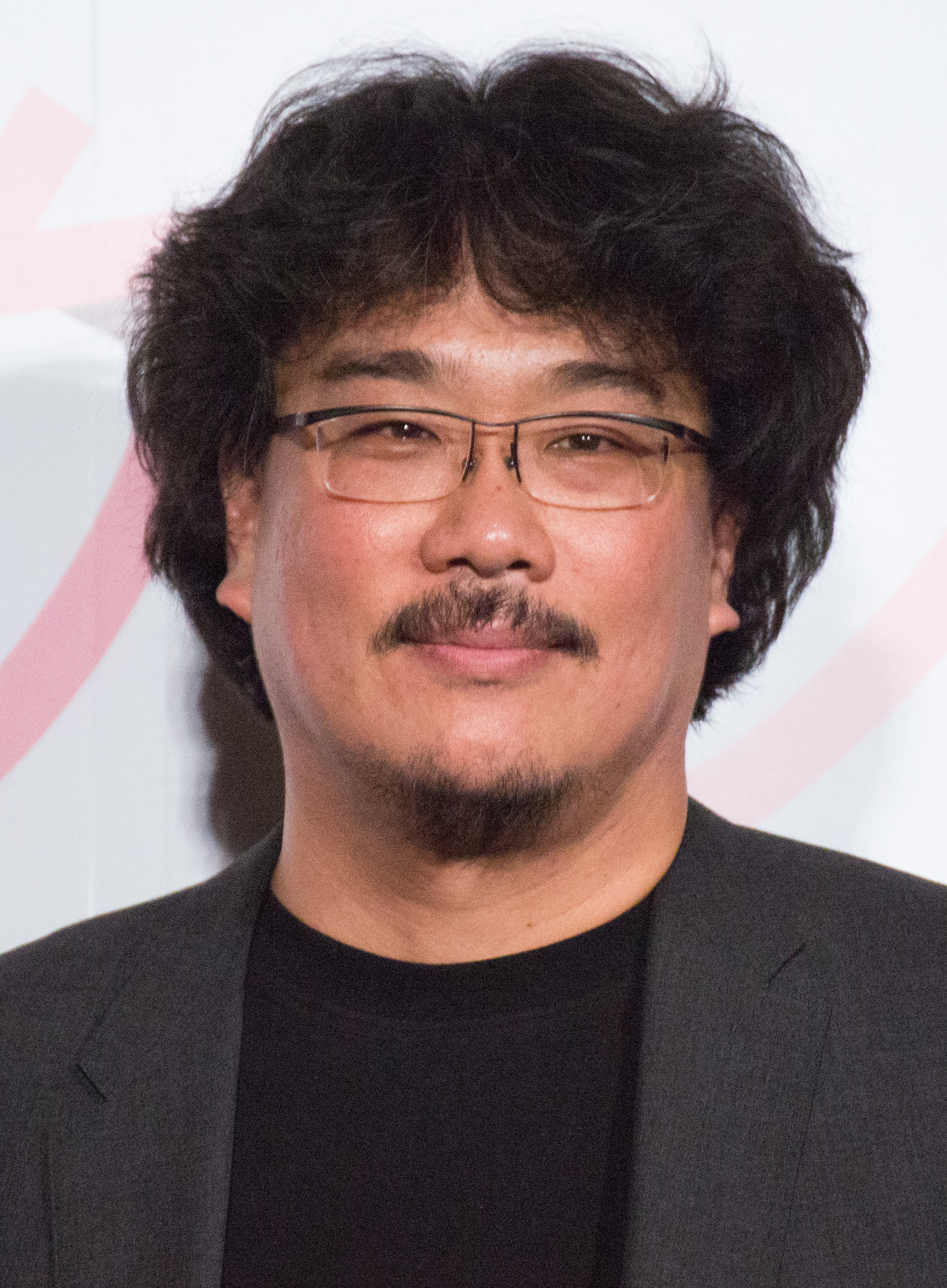
Bong Joon-ho

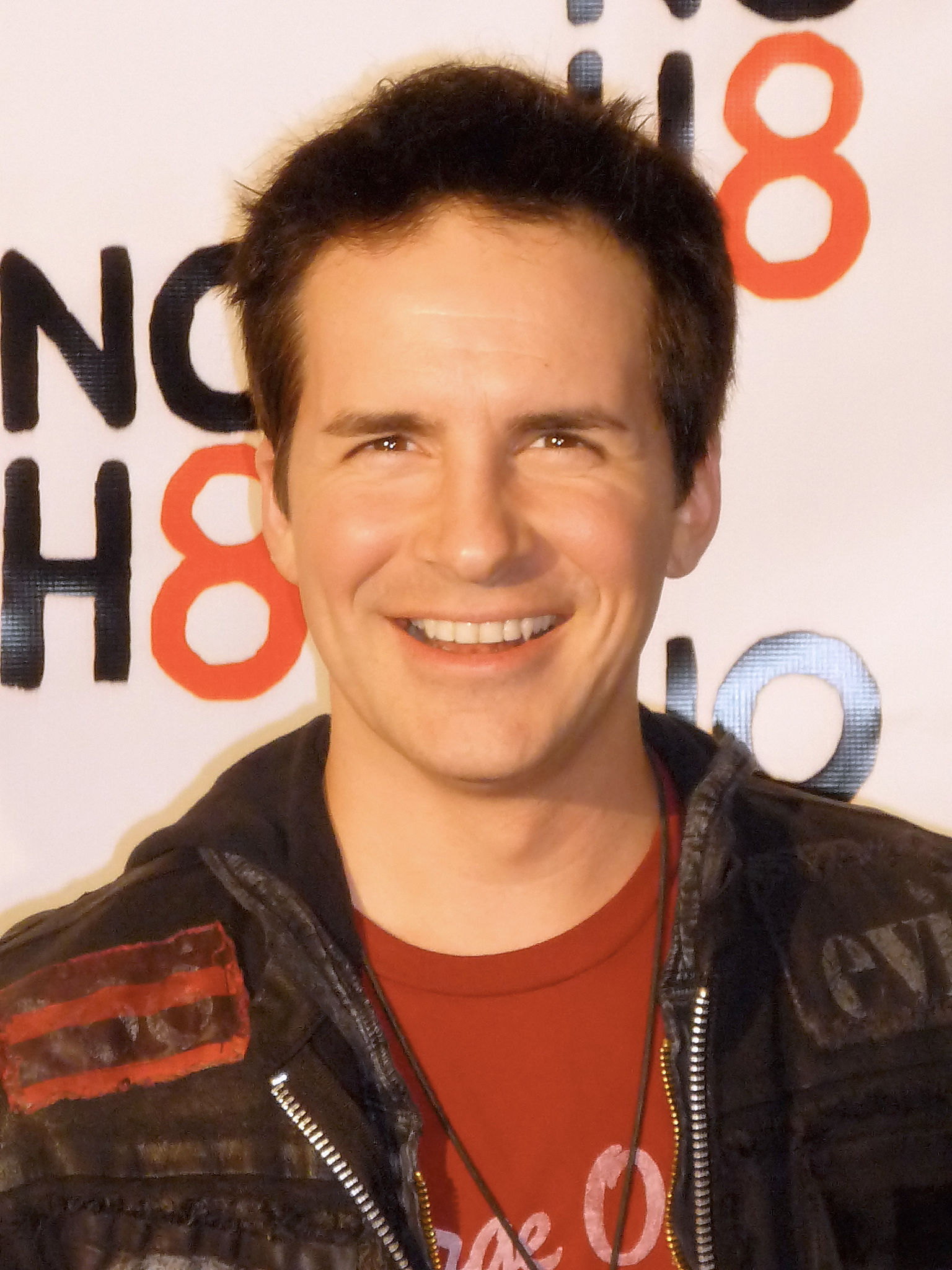
Hal Sparks

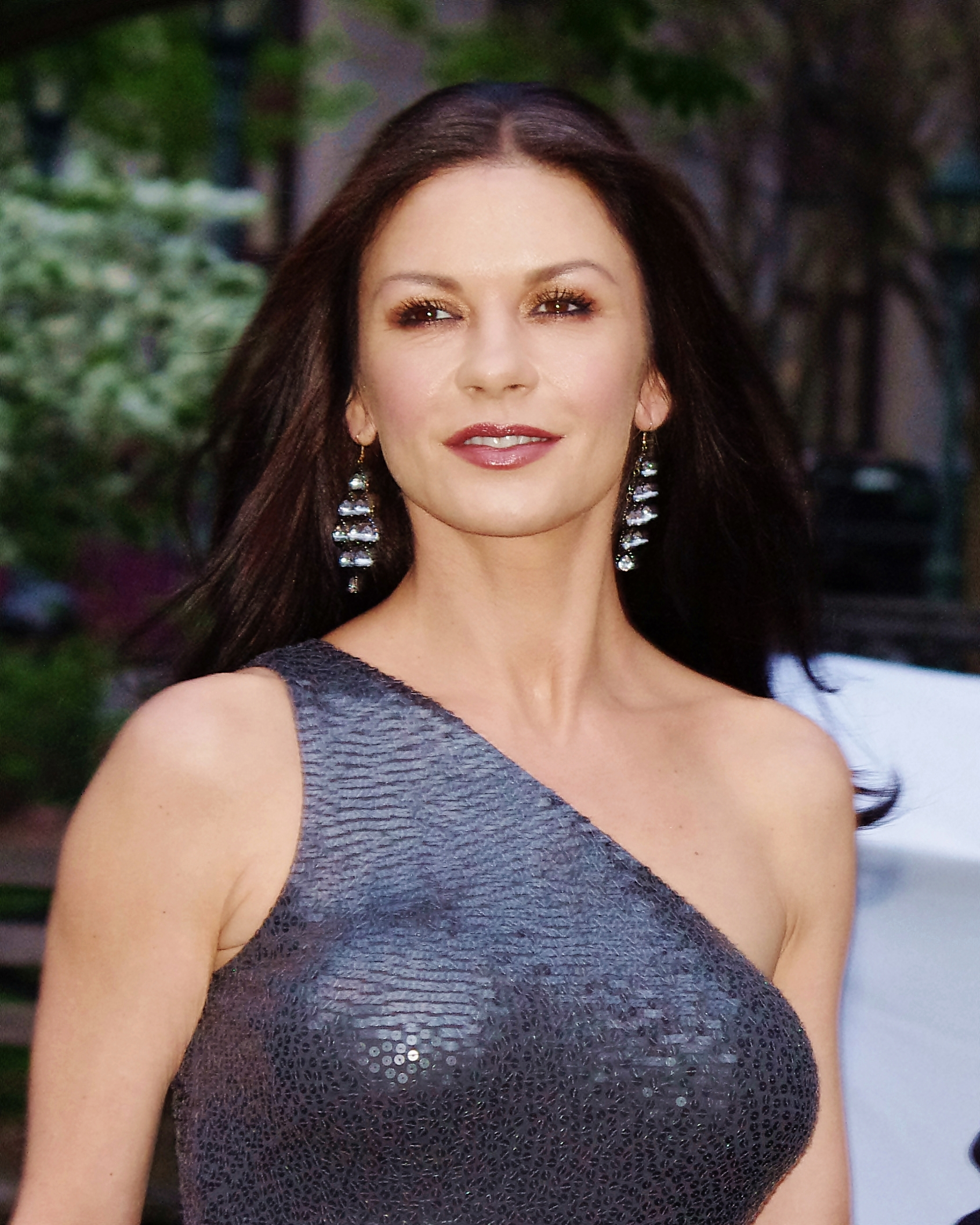
Catherine Zeta-Jones

- September 3 – Robert Karlsson, Swedish golfer
- September 4
  - Giorgi Margvelashvili, politician; 4th President of the Republic of Georgia
  - Noah Taylor, Australian actor
- September 6
  - Michellie Jones, Australian triathlete
  - Cece Peniston, American musician
- September 7 – Diane Farr, American actress
- September 8
  - Mojtaba Khamenei, Iranian politician and Shia cleric, Supreme leader
  - Gary Speed, Welsh footballer and manager (d. 2011)
- September 8 – Rachel Hunter, New Zealand model and actress
- September 12
  - Ángel Cabrera, Argentine golfer
  - Shigeki Maruyama, Japanese golfer
- September 13
  - Tyler Perry, American actor, film director and screenwriter
  - Shane Warne, Australian cricketer (d. 2022)
- September 14 – Bong Joon-ho, South Korean film director and screenwriter
- September 17
  - Ken Doherty, Irish snooker player
  - Keith Flint, English singer/dancer in the band The Prodigy (d. 2019)
- September 19 – Simona Păucă, Romanian gymnast
- September 21 – Billy Porter, American actor and singer
- September 22 – Sue Perkins, English actress and comedian
- September 24 – Shawn Crahan, American rock percussionist
- September 25
  - Hansie Cronje, South African cricketer (d. 2002)
  - Catherine Zeta-Jones, Welsh actress
  - Hal Sparks, American comedian, actor, musician, and political commentator
- September 29
  - Erika Eleniak, American model and actress
  - Aleks Syntek, Mexican singer and songwriter
- September 30 – Jackie Traverse, Canadian artist and activist
  - Chris Von Erich, American professional wrestler (d. 1991)

=== October ===
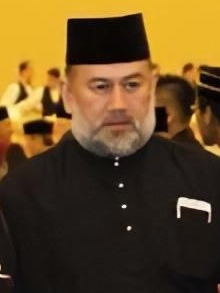
Muhammad V of Kelantan

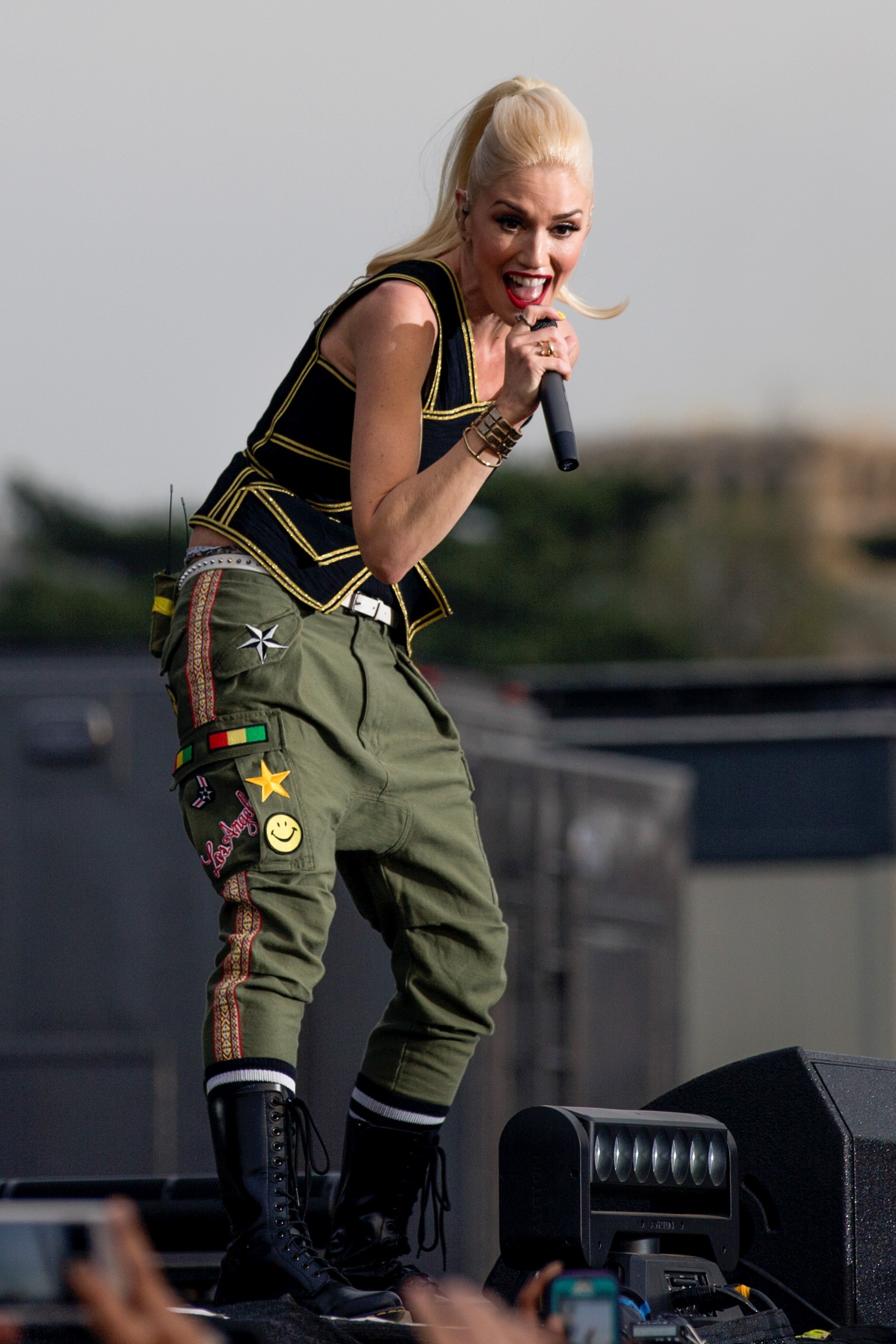
Gwen Stefani

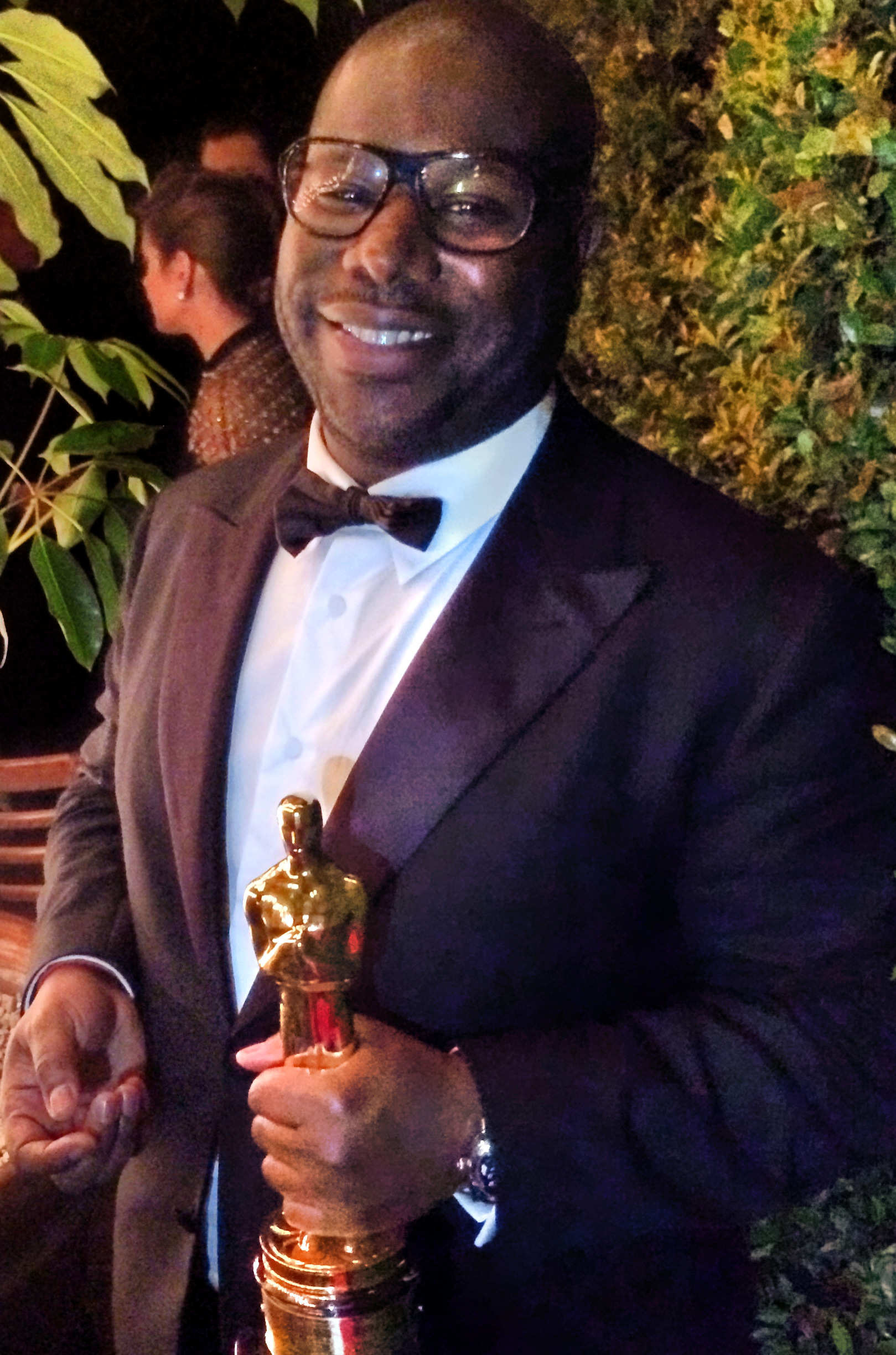
Sir Steve McQueen

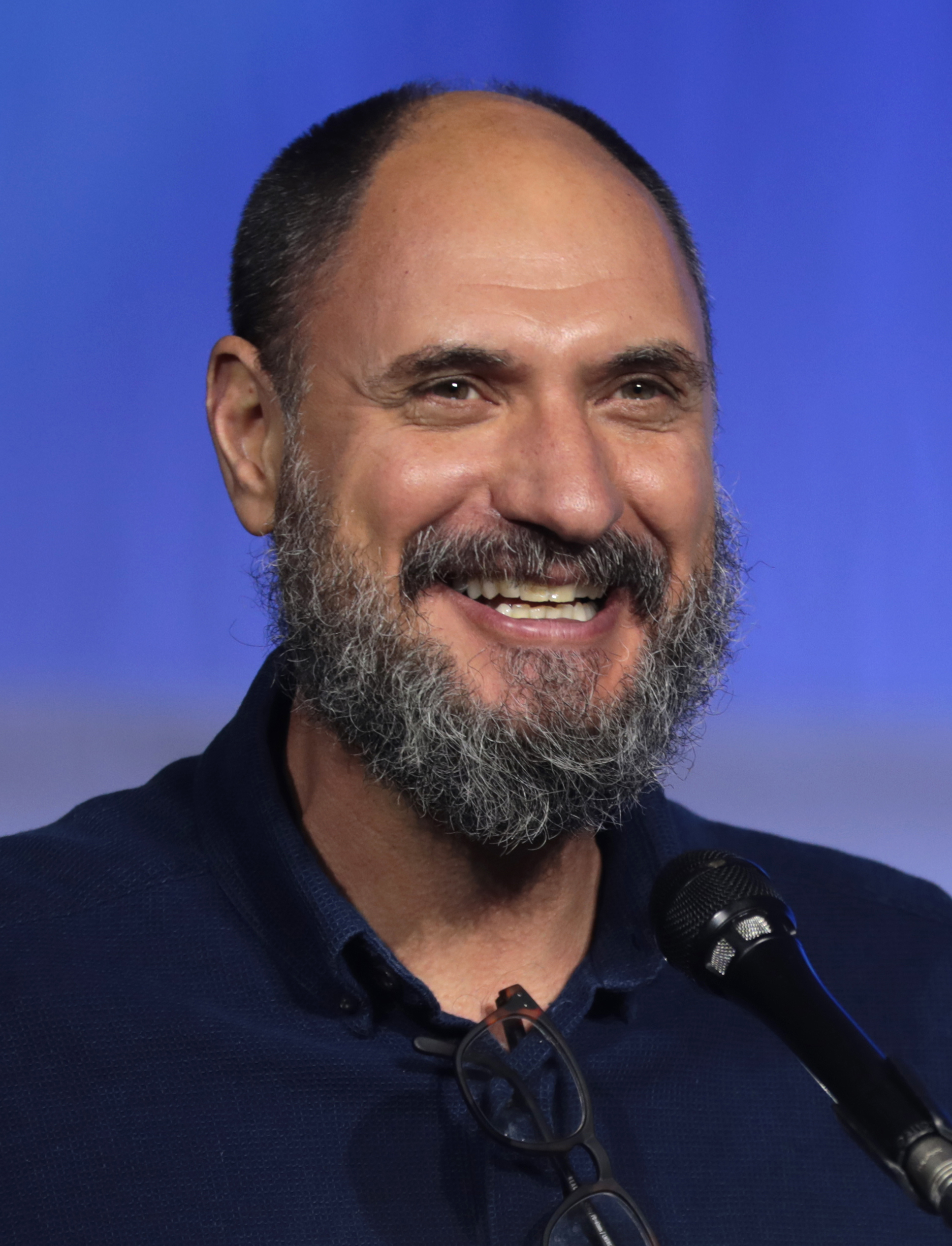
Loren Bouchard

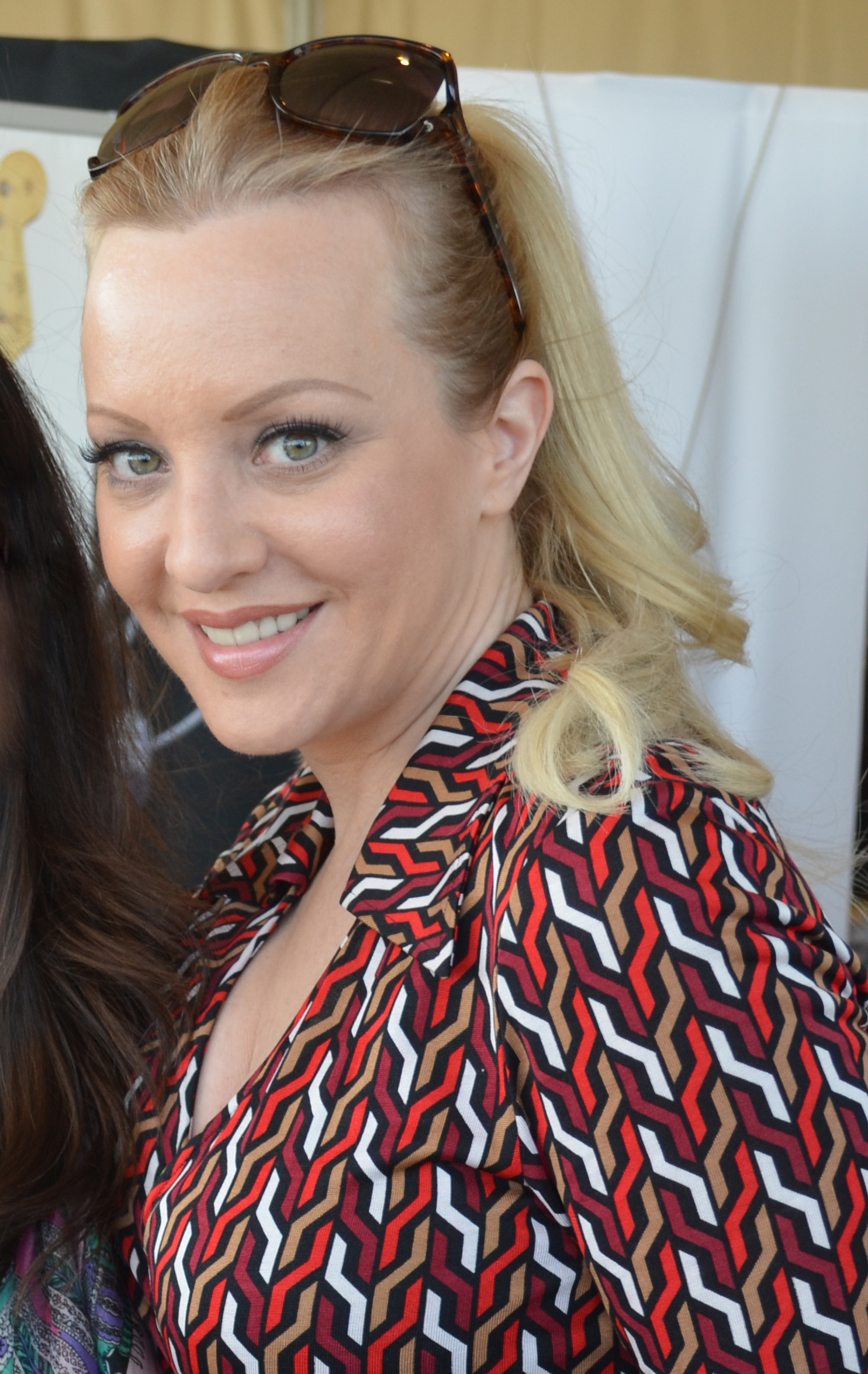
Wendi McLendon-Covey

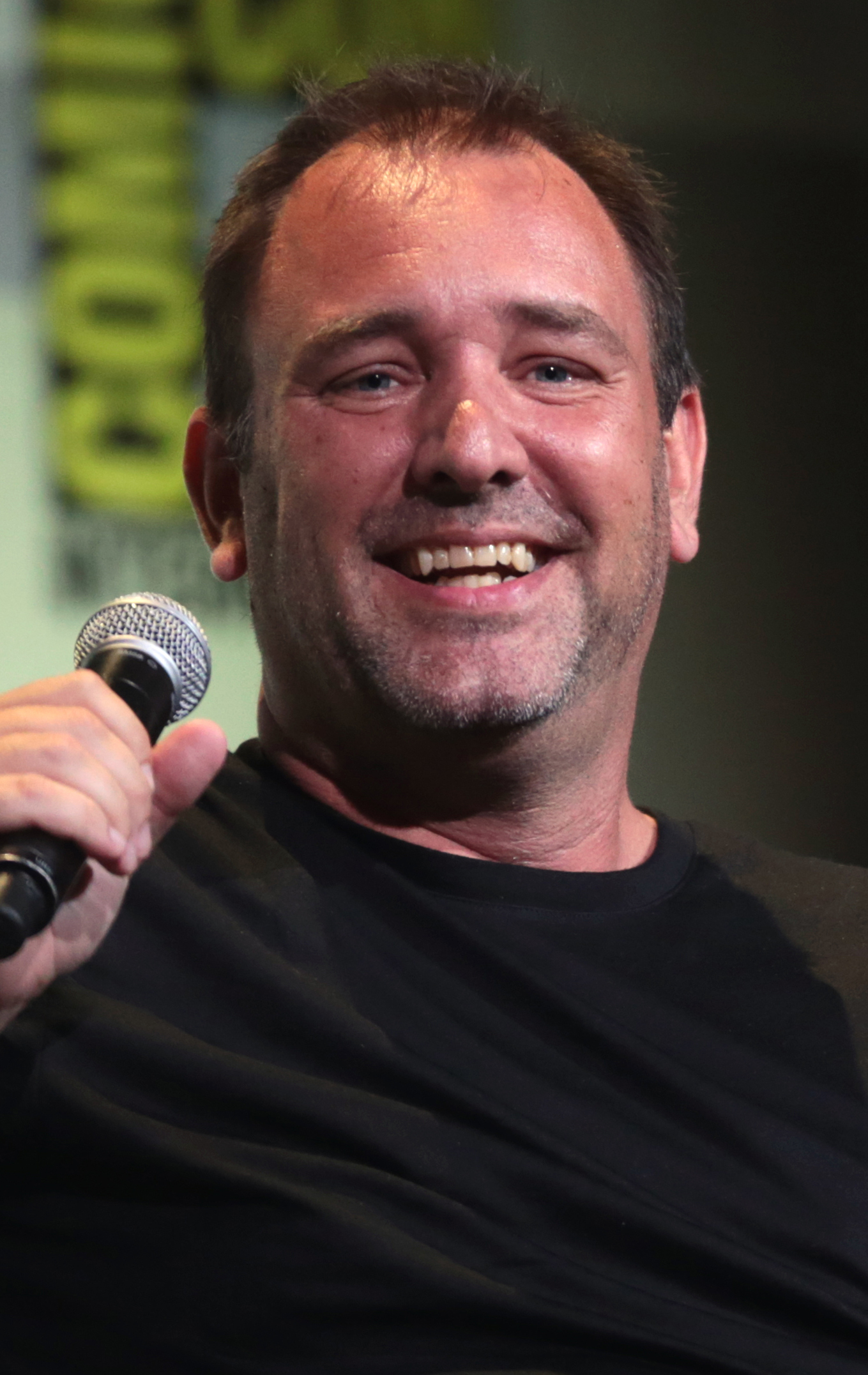
Trey Parker

- October 1
  - Zach Galifianakis, American actor and stand-up comedian
  - Marcus Stephen, President of Nauru
  - Igor Ulanov, Russian hockey player
- October 3
  - Gwen Stefani, American singer, actress and television host
  - Tetsuya, Japanese rock musician
- October 5 – Elizabeth Azcona Bocock, Honduran politician
- October 6
  - Muhammad V of Kelantan, 15th Yang di-Pertuan Agong of Malaysia and Sultan of Kelantan
  - Ogün Temizkanoğlu, Turkish footballer
- October 7 – Benny Chan Ho Man, Hong Kong actor
- October 9
  - Jun Akiyama, Japanese professional wrestler
  - PJ Harvey, British singer-songwriter
  - Steve McQueen, English film director, producer and screenwriter
  - Chan Chun Sing, Singaporean politician
- October 10
  - Brett Favre, American football player
  - Wendi McLendon-Covey, American actress
- October 11 – Merieme Chadid, Moroccan born-French astronomer
- October 12 – Judit Mascó, Spanish model, television host and writer
- October 13
  - Nancy Kerrigan, American figure skater
  - Cady McClain, American actress and director
- October 15 – Dominic West, English actor, director and musician
- October 16 – Wendy Wilson, American singer and television personality
- October 17
  - Ernie Els, South African golfer
  - Jesús Ángel García, Spanish race walker
  - Wood Harris, American actor
  - Wyclef Jean, Haitian rapper
- October 19
  - Pedro Castillo, 63rd President of Peru
  - Vanessa Marshall, American actress and voice actress
  - Trey Parker, American actor, voice actor, animator, writer, producer, director and composer
- October 20
  - Laurie Daley, Australian rugby league player
  - Juan González, American baseball player
- October 21 – Michael Hancock, Australian rugby league player
- October 22 – Spike Jonze, American director and filmmaker
- October 24
  - Peter Dolving, Swedish metal musician
  - Adela Noriega, Mexican actress
- October 25
  - Samantha Bee, Canadian comedian, writer, producer and political commentator
  - Josef Beránek, Czech ice hockey player
  - Oleg Salenko, Russian footballer
- October 26 – Sarina Wiegman, Dutch footballer and manager
- October 28
  - Steven Chamuleau, Dutch cardiologist
- October 30
  - Stanislav Gross, 5th Prime Minister of the Czech Republic (d. 2015)
  - Snow, Canadian reggae singer
- October 31 – Kim Rossi Stuart, Italian actor and director

=== November ===
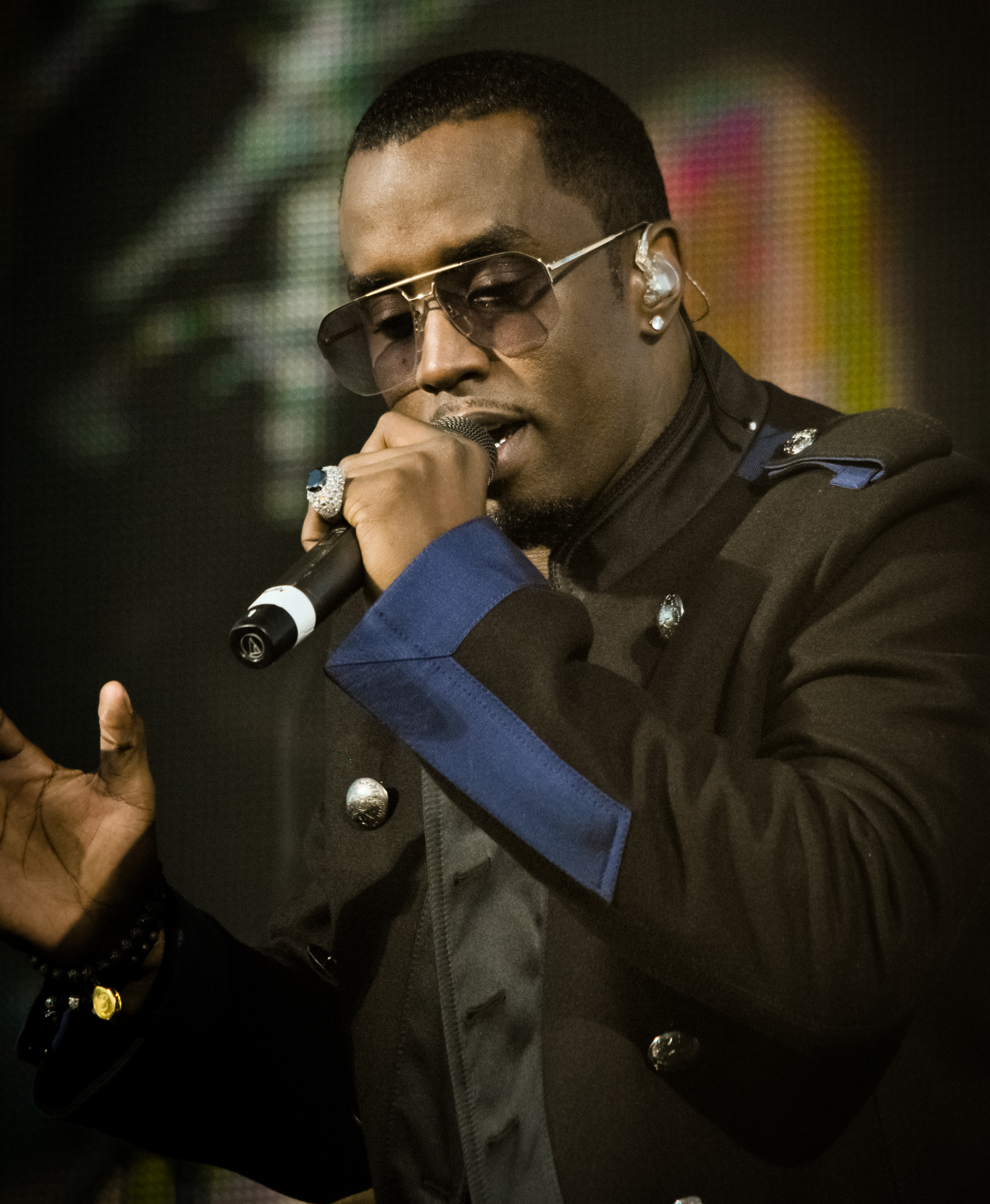
Sean Combs

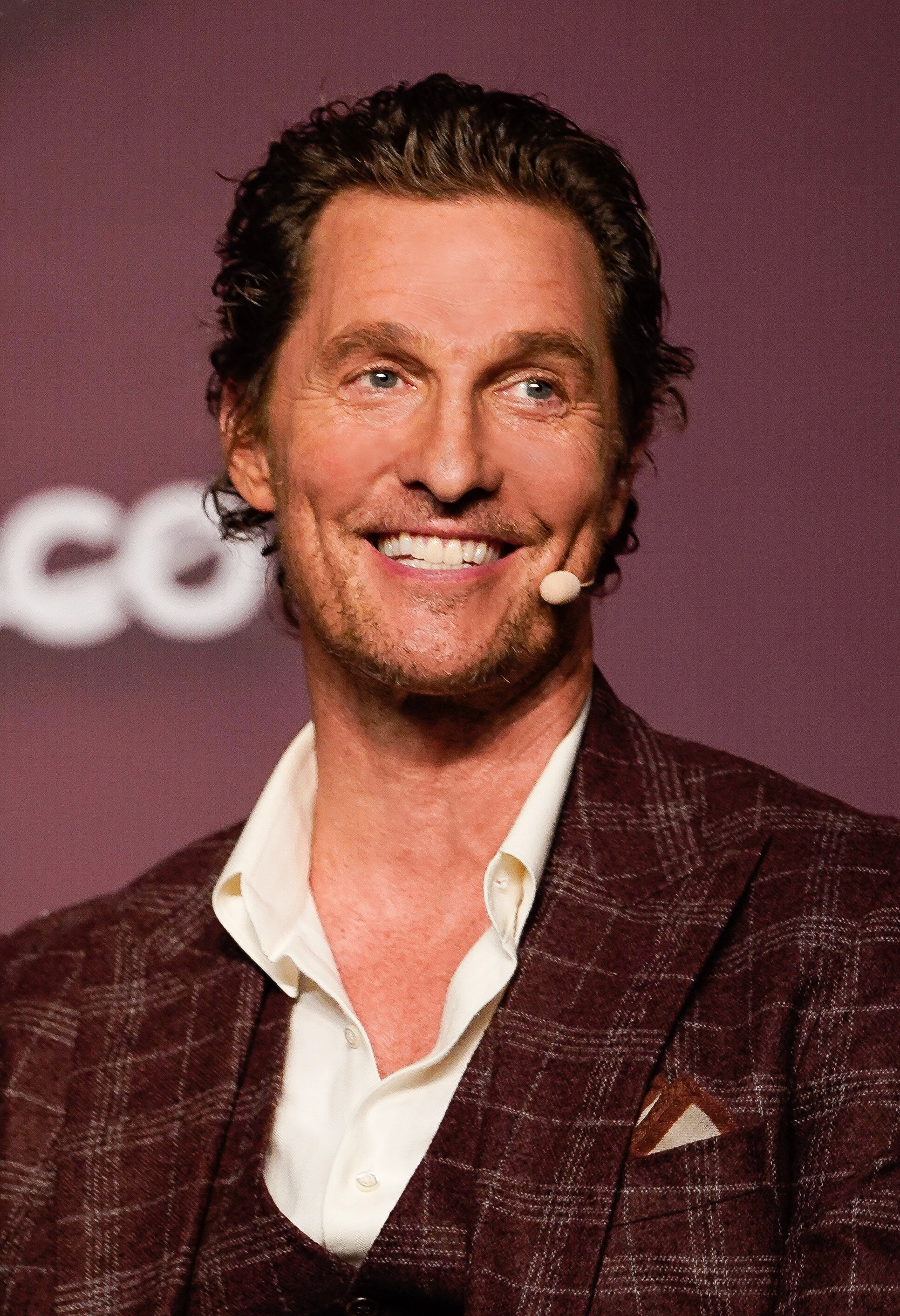
Matthew McConaughey

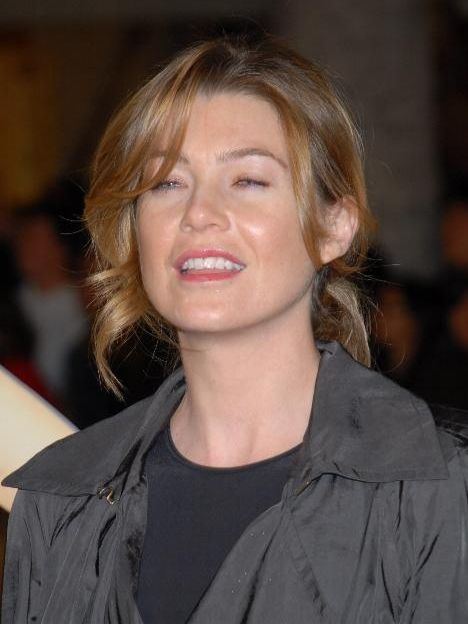
Ellen Pompeo

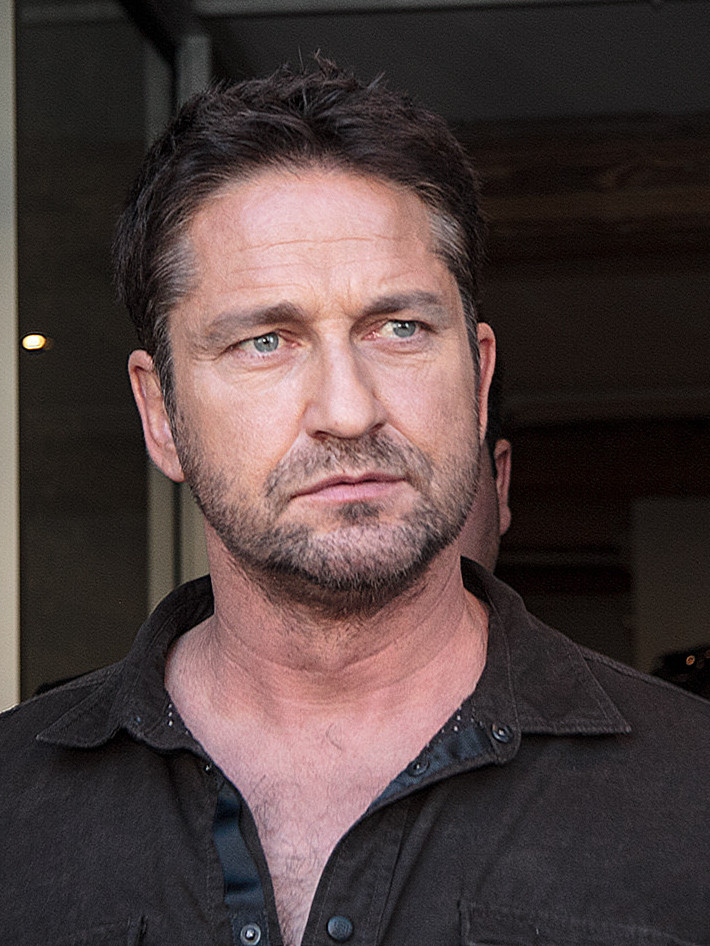
Gerard Butler

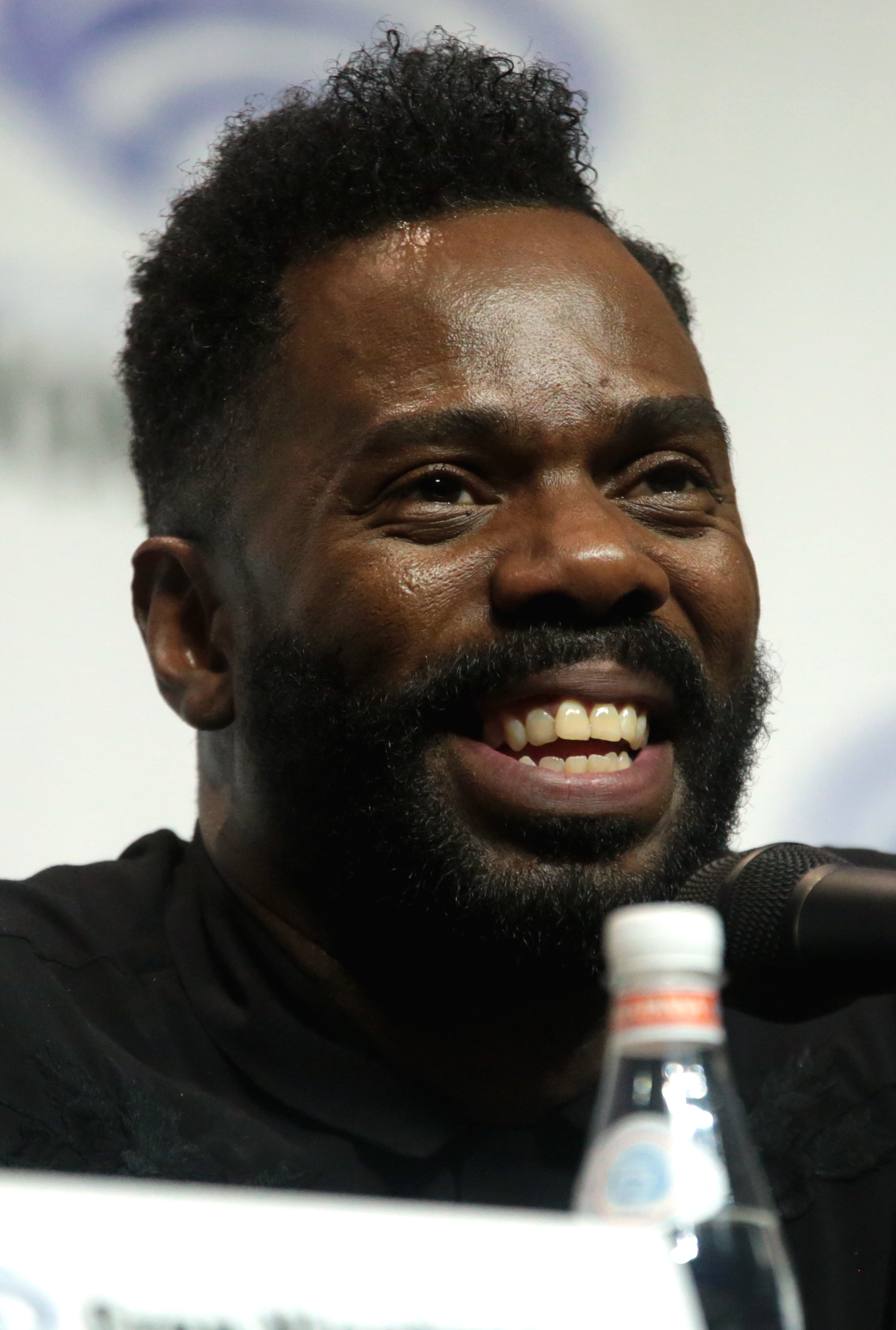
Colman Domingo

- November 1 – Gary Alexander, American basketball player
- November 2
  - Reginald Arvizu (aka Fieldy Snuts), American bassist
  - Madhushree, Indian playback singer
- November 3 – Robert Miles, Swiss-born Italian record producer and DJ (d. 2017)
- November 4
  - Tony Burke, Australian politician, Leader of the House (2022-present)
  - Sean Combs, American rapper and entrepreneur
  - Matthew McConaughey, American actor
- November 7
  - Michelle Clunie, American actress
  - Hélène Grimaud, French pianist
- November 8 – Jonathan Slavin, American actor and activist
- November 10
  - Faustino Asprilla, Colombian football player
  - Jens Lehmann, German football player
  - Ellen Pompeo, American actress
- November 12 – Tomas N'evergreen, Danish singer
- November 13
  - Ayaan Hirsi Ali, Somali-born Dutch American activist
  - Gerard Butler, Scottish actor
- November 14 – Butch Walker, American musician
- November 17 – Jean-Michel Saive, Belgian table tennis player
- November 18
  - Sam Cassell, American basketball player
  - Ahmed Helmy, Egyptian actor
  - Duncan Sheik, American singer-songwriter and composer (d. 2026)
- November 19
  - Ertuğrul Sağlam, Turkish football coach and former player
  - Viktor Skrypnyk, Ukrainian football coach and former player
- November 21 – Ken Griffey Jr., American baseball player
- November 22
  - Katrin Krabbe, German sprinter
  - Marjane Satrapi, Iranian-French graphic novelist (d. 2026)
- November 23 – Robin Padilla, Filipino actor
- November 24 – David Adeang, Nauruan politician
- November 26 – Kara Walker, American artist
- November 27
  - Elizabeth Marvel, American actress
  - Carina Ricco, Mexican actress and singer
- November 28
  - Colman Domingo, African-American actor
  - Lexington Steele, African-American actor and film director
- November 29
  - Pierre van Hooijdonk, Dutch footballer
  - Kasey Keller, American Major League Soccer player
  - Mariano Rivera, Panamanian-American professional baseball player
- November 30
  - Trina Gulliver, English darts player
  - Chris Weitz, American film director, screenwriter, producer, and actor

=== December ===
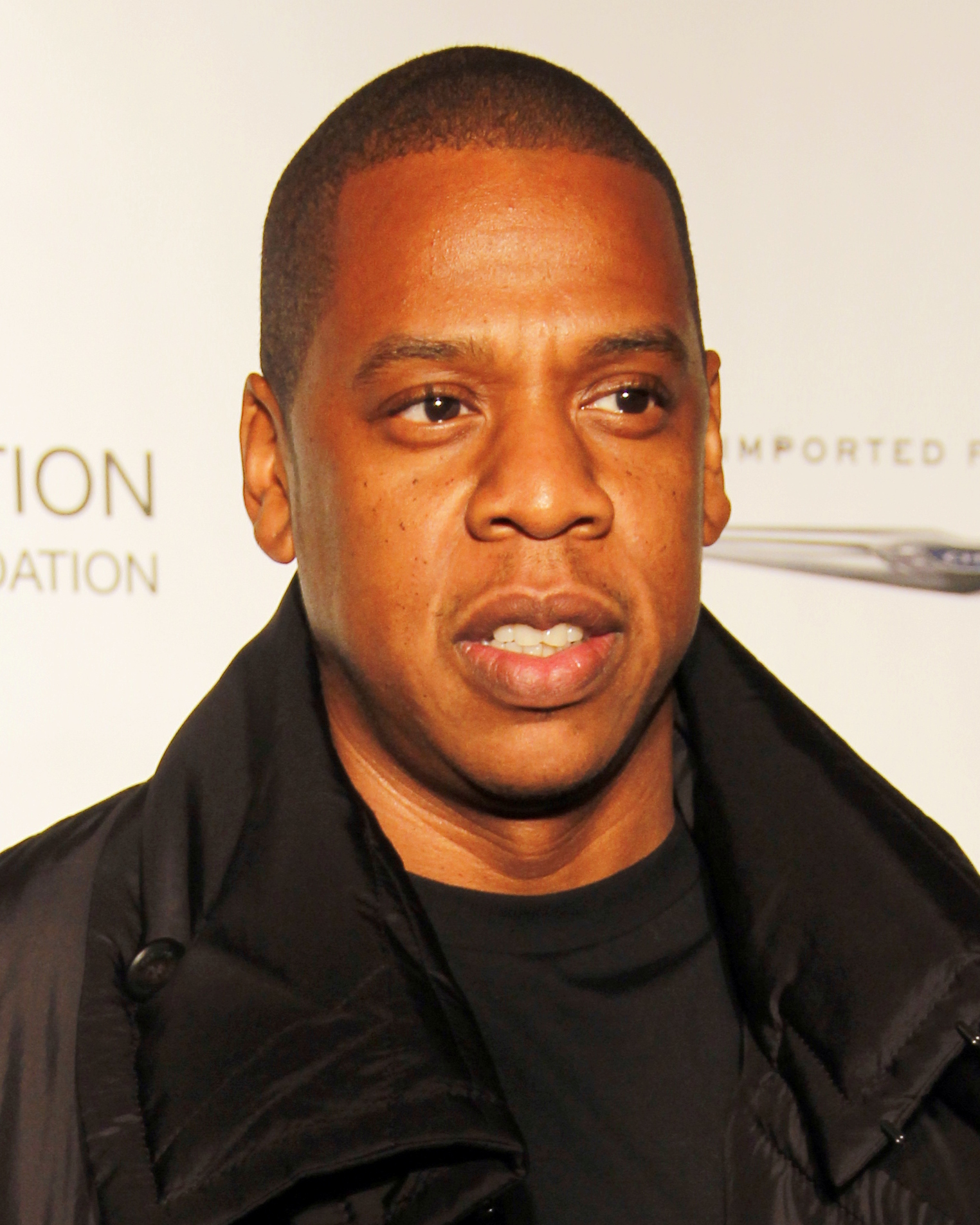
Jay-Z

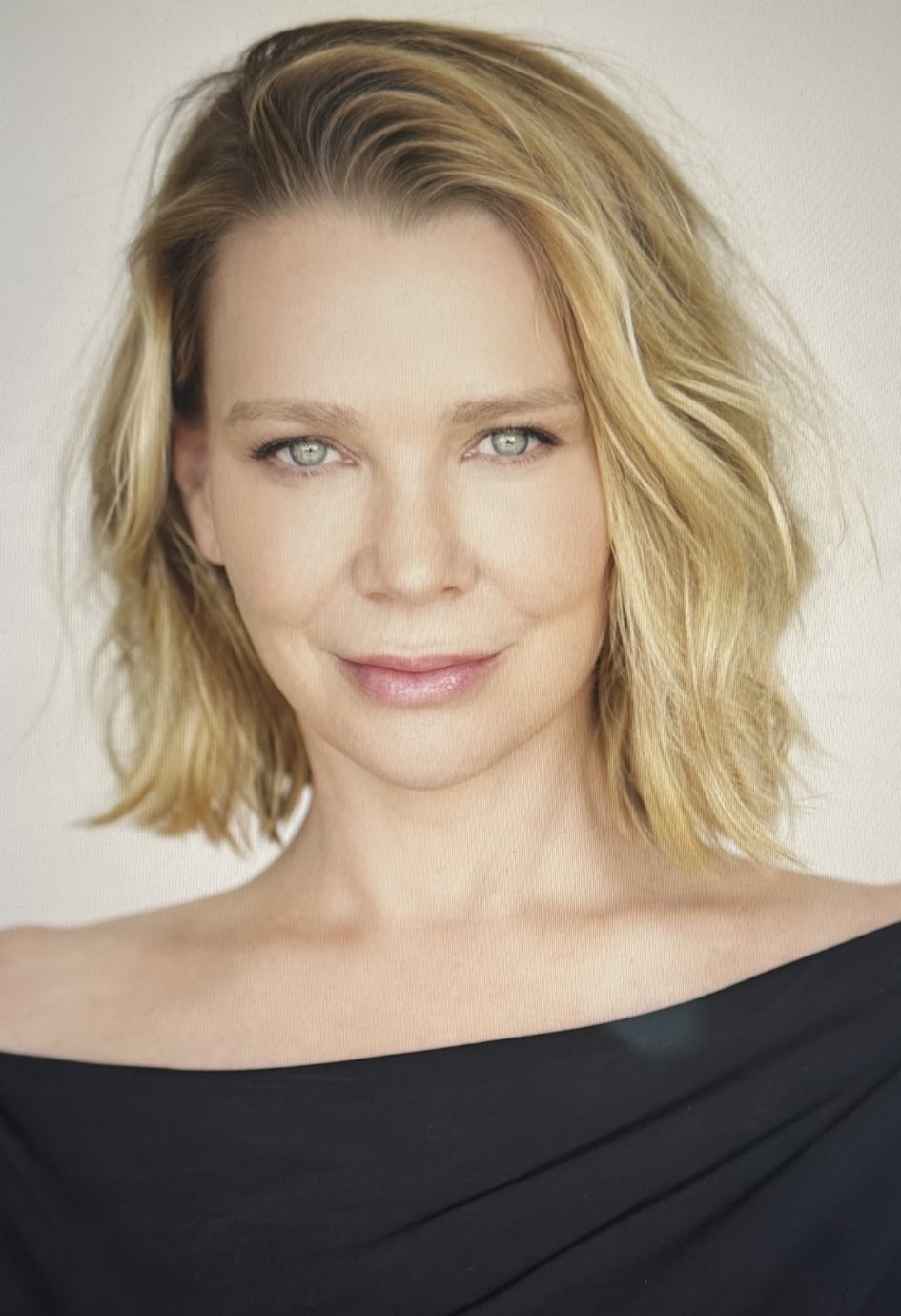
Laurie Holden

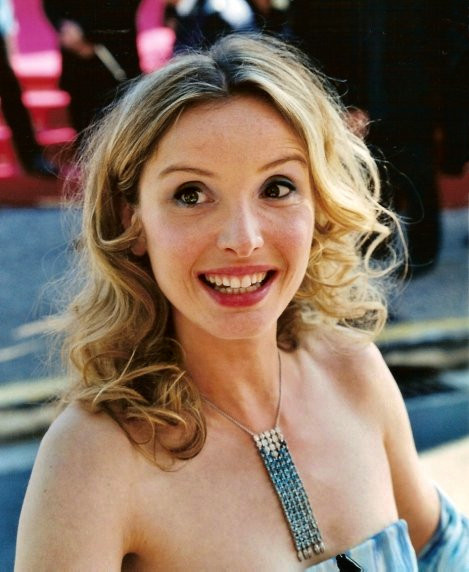
Julie Delpy

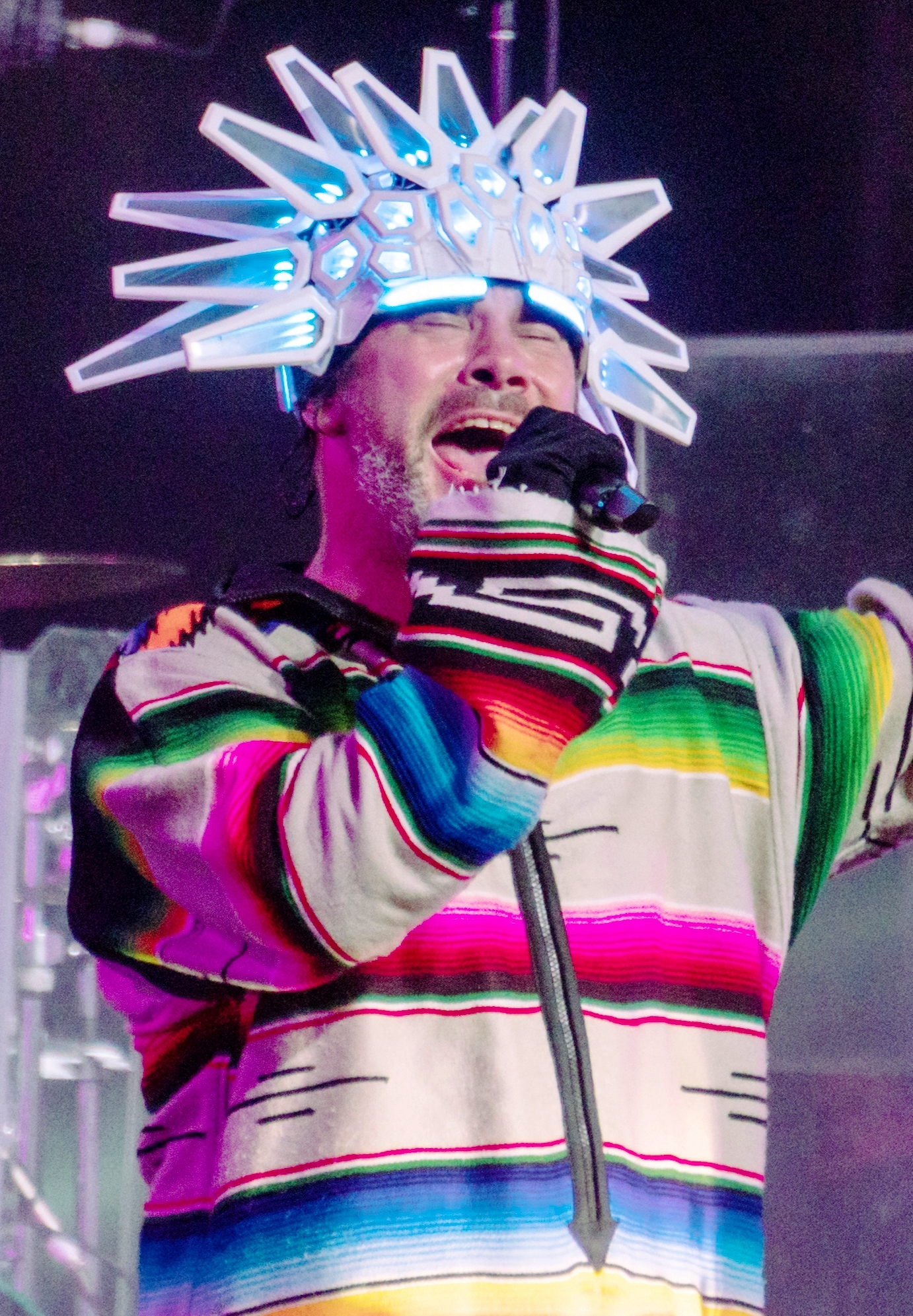
Jay Kay

- December 4 – Jay-Z, African-American rapper
- December 5
  - Sajid Javid, British Pakistani politician, Chancellor of the Exchequer
  - Catherine Tate, English actress, comedian, and writer
- December 9 – Bixente Lizarazu, French footballer
- December 11 – Viswanathan Anand, Indian chess grandmaster
- December 16 – Michelle Smith, Irish swimmer
- December 17
  - Laurie Holden, Canadian and American actress, producer and human rights activist
  - Chuck Liddell, American mixed martial arts fighter
  - Ismail Qasim Naji, Somali politician
- December 18
  - Santiago Cañizares, Spanish footballer
  - Mille Petrozza, German-Italian rock vocalist and guitarist (Kreator)
- December 19 – Kristy Swanson, American actress
- December 20 – Nicușor Dan, president of Romania
- December 21
  - Julie Delpy, French-American actress
  - Magnus Samuelsson, Swedish bodybuilder, World's Strongest Man
- December 22 – Dagmar Hase, German swimmer
- December 24
  - Pernille Fischer Christensen, Danish film director
  - Ed Miliband, English academic and politician, Foreign Secretary
  - Mark Millar, Scottish author
  - Oleg Skripochka, Russian cosmonaut
  - Gintaras Staučė, Lithuanian footballer
  - Chen Yueling, Chinese-born American race walker
- December 25 – Nicolas Godin, French musician
- December 27 – Chyna, American professional wrestler (d. 2016)
- December 28 – Linus Torvalds, Finnish computer programmer
- December 30
  - Kersti Kaljulaid, 5th President of Estonia
  - Jay Kay, English singer (Jamiroquai)

== Deaths ==
=== January ===
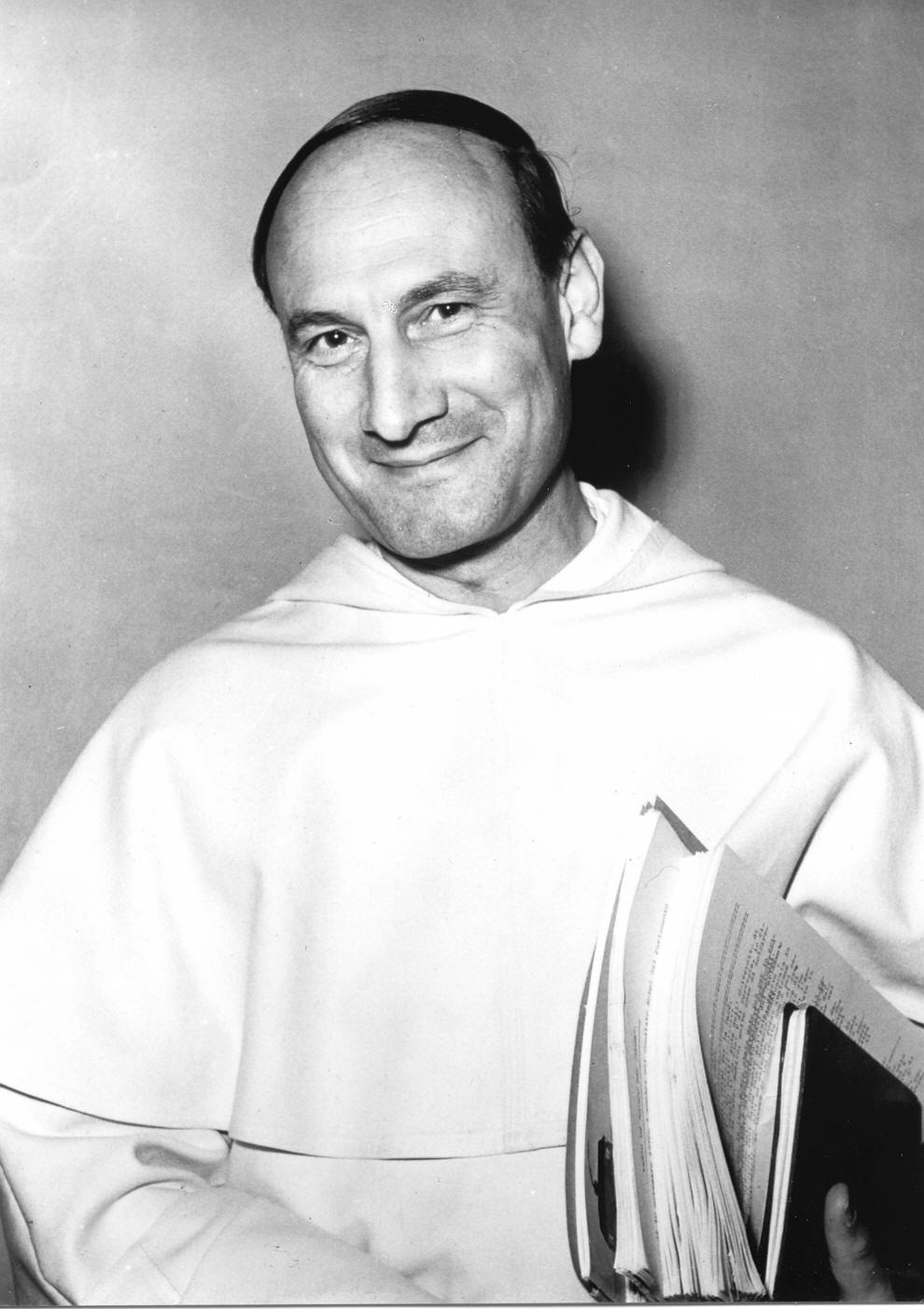
Dominique Pire

- January 1 – Barton MacLane, American actor (b. 1902)
- January 3 – Commodore Cochran, American Olympic athlete (b. 1902)
- January 4 – Paul Chambers, American jazz bassist (b. 1935)
- January 6 – Shalva Nutsubidze, Georgian philosopher, historian, rustvelologist, literary critic, translator, and public figure (b. 1888)
- January 8 – Albert Hill, British athlete (b. 1889)
- January 12
  - Lionel Hitchman, Canadian ice hockey player (b. 1901)
  - Roberto Noble, Argentine politician, journalist and publisher (b. 1902)
- January 19 – Jan Palach, Czech student (b. 1948)
- January 27 – Charles Winninger, American actor (b. 1884)
- January 29 – Allen Dulles, American director of the Central Intelligence Agency (b. 1893)
- January 30 – Dominique Pire, Belgian Dominican friar, Nobel Peace Prize laureate (b. 1910)
- January 31 – Meher Baba, Indian spiritual master (b. 1894)

=== February ===
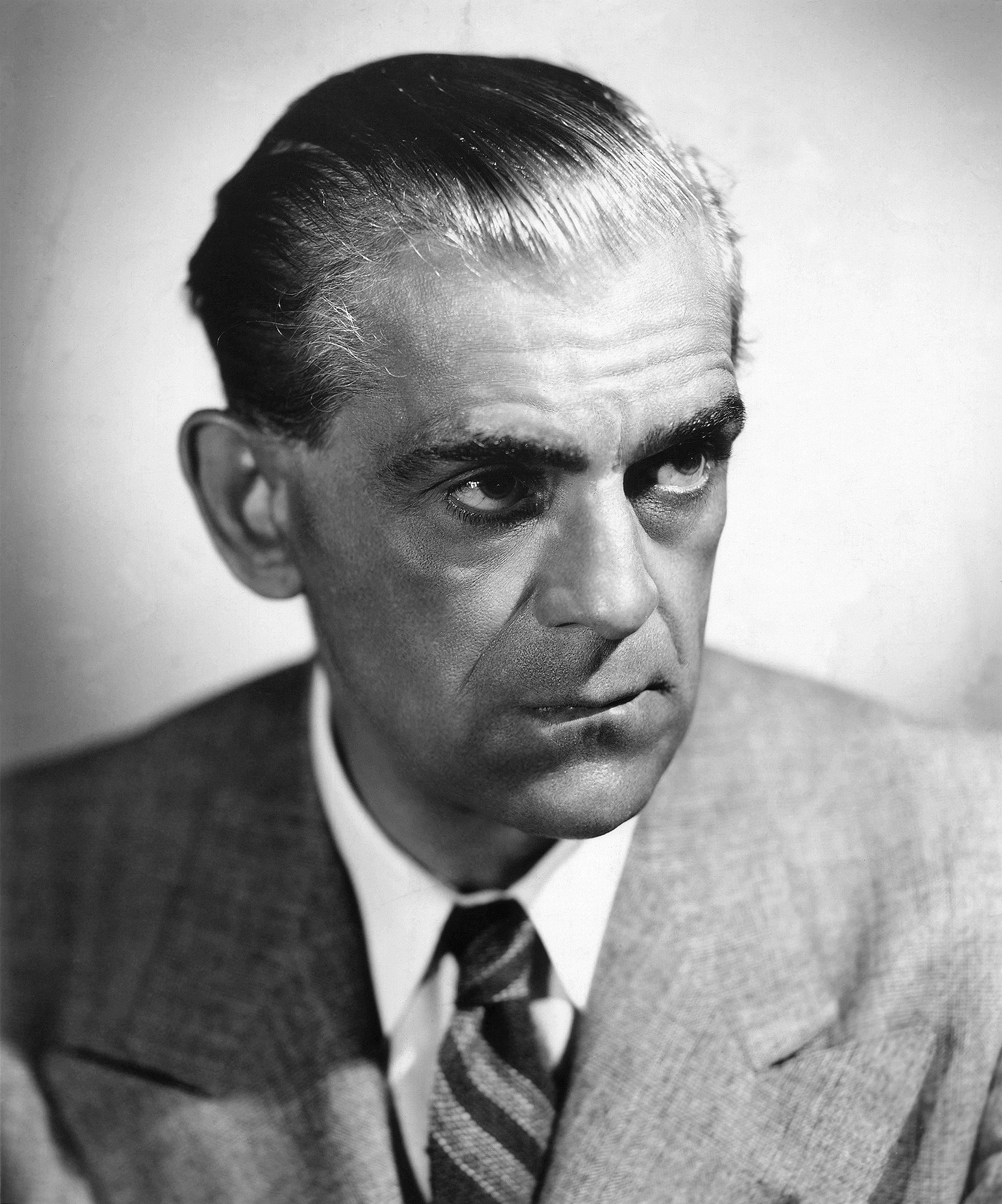
Boris Karloff

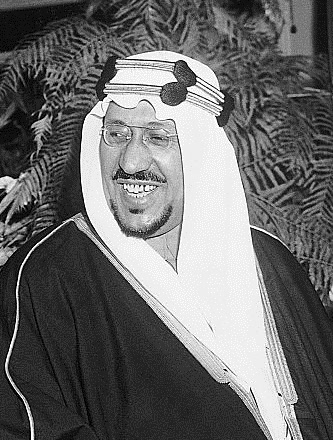
King Saud bin Abdulaziz Al Saud

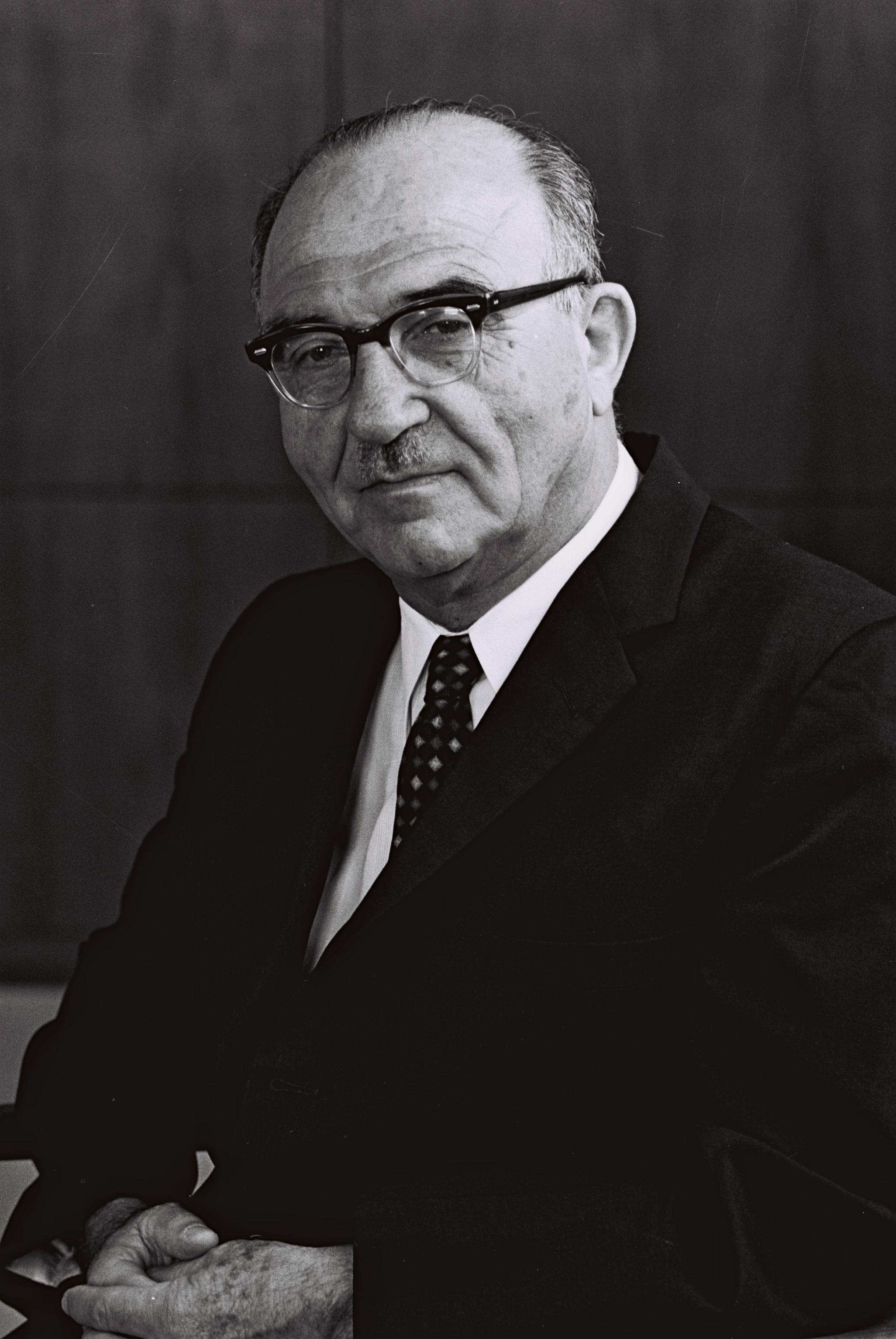
Levi Eshkol

- February 2 – Boris Karloff, English actor (b. 1887)
- February 3
  - Eduardo Mondlane, leader of the Mozambique nationalist organization FRELIMO (b. 1920)
  - Al Taliaferro, American Disney comics artist (b. 1905)
  - C. N. Annadurai, Indian politician and Chief Minister of Tamil Nadu (b. 1909)
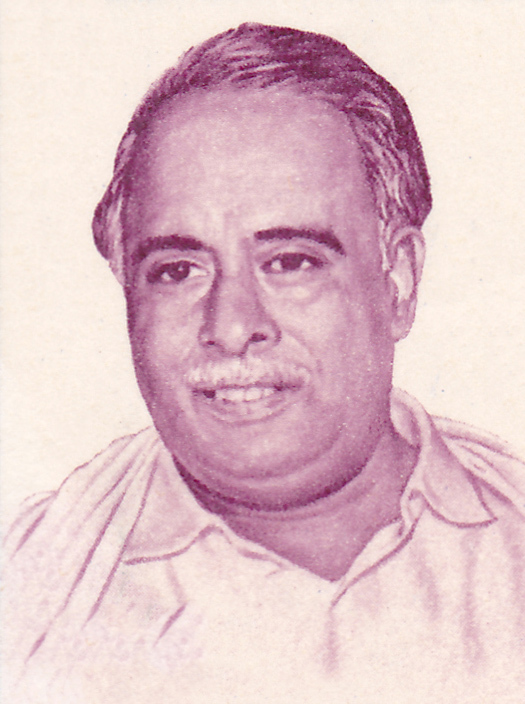
    C. N. Annadurai
- February 5 – Thelma Ritter, American actress (b. 1902)
- February 6 – Kamil Yusuf Al-Bahtimi, Egyptian Quran reciter (b. 1922)
- February 9 – George "Gabby" Hayes, American actor (b. 1885)
- February 13 – Florence Mary Taylor, English-born Australian architect (b. 1879)
- February 14 – Vito Genovese, Italian-American mobster (b. 1897)
- February 18 – Dragiša Cvetković, 13th Prime Minister of Yugoslavia (b. 1893)
- February 19 – Madge Blake, American actress (b. 1899)
- February 20 – Ernest Ansermet, Swiss conductor (b. 1883)
- February 23
  - King Saud of Saudi Arabia, (b. 1902)
  - Madhubala, Indian actress (b. 1933)
- February 25 – Jan Zajíc, Czech student (b. 1950)
- February 26
  - Levi Eshkol, 3rd Prime Minister of Israel (b. 1895)
  - Karl Jaspers, German psychiatrist and philosopher (b. 1883)
- February 27 – John Boles, American actor (b. 1895)

=== March ===
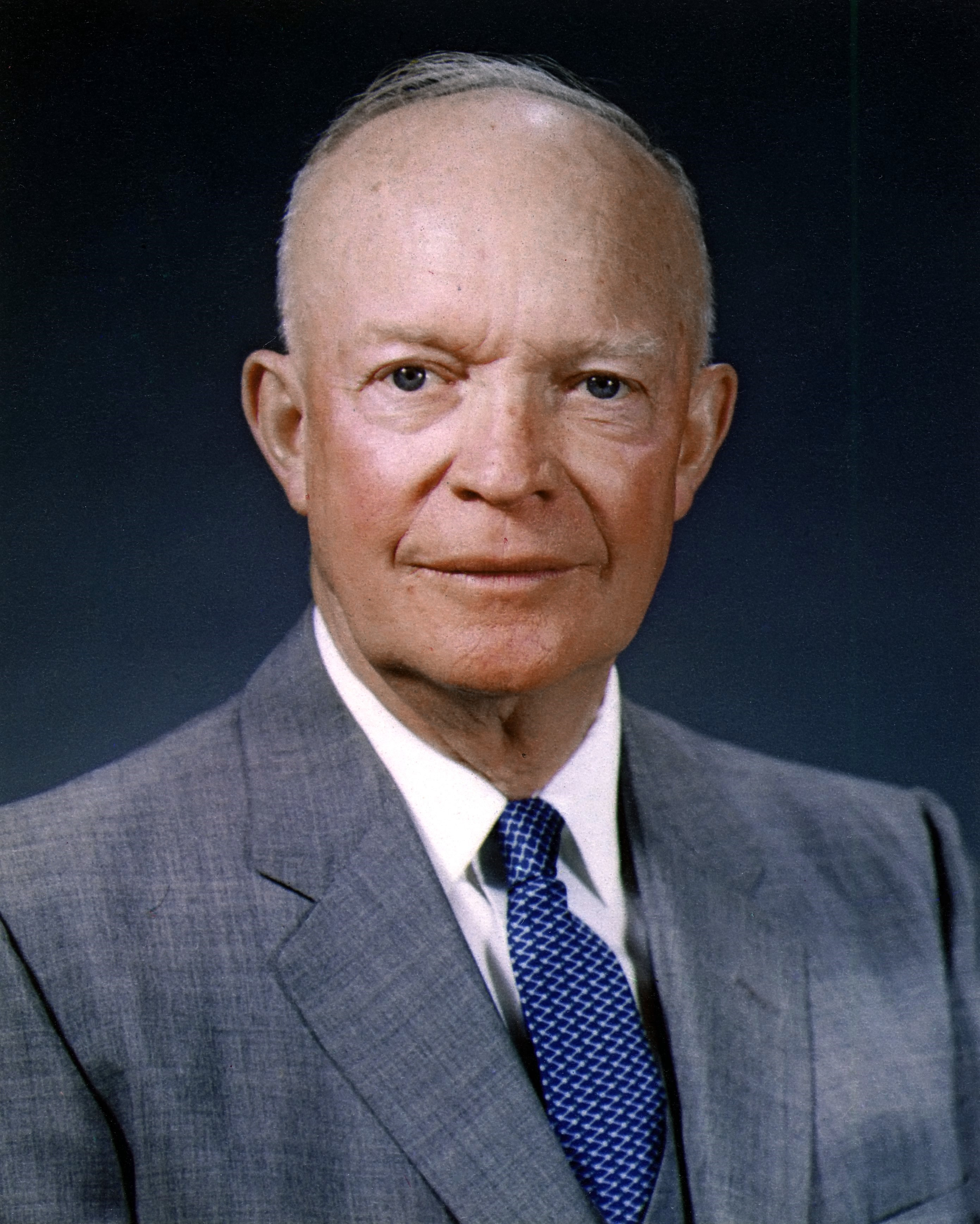
Dwight D. Eisenhower

- March 3
  - Ali Jawdat al-Aiyubi, 11th Prime Minister of Iraq (b. 1886)
  - Fred Alexander, American tennis player (b. 1880)
- March 6 – Óscar Osorio, Salvadorian military leader, 32nd President of El Salvador (b. 1910)
- March 11
  - Daniel E. Barbey, American admiral (b. 1889)
  - John Wyndham, English author (b. 1903)
- March 14 – Ben Shahn, Lithuanian-American artist (b. 1898)
- March 15 – Miles Malleson, English actor (b. 1888)
- March 24 – Joseph Kasavubu, 1st President of Congo-Léopoldville (b. 1917)
- March 25 – Max Eastman, American writer (b. 1883)
- March 26 – John Kennedy Toole, American author (b. 1937)
- March 28 – Dwight D. Eisenhower, American general and politician, 34th President of the United States (b. 1890)

=== April ===
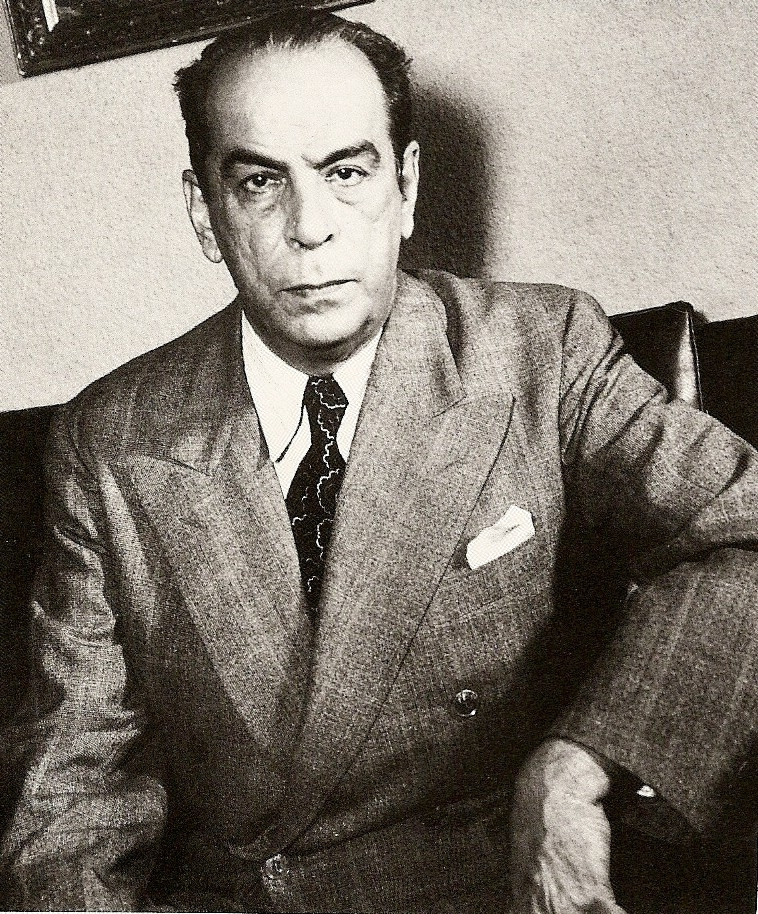
Rómulo Gallegos

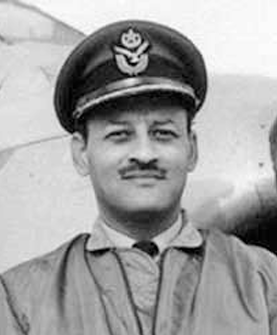
FS Hussain

- April 2 – Fortunio Bonanova, Spanish actor and singer (b. 1895)
- April 5
  - Alberto Bonucci, Italian actor and director (b. 1918)
  - Rómulo Gallegos, Venezuelan novelist and politician, 48th President of Venezuela (b. 1884)
- April 9 – FS Hussain, Pakistani aerobatic pilot who fought in World War II (b. 1924)
- April 10 – Harley Earl, American designer and executive (b. 1893)
- April 15 – Victoria Eugenie of Battenberg, Queen consort of Spain (b. 1887)
- April 20 – Vjekoslav Luburić, Croatian Ustaše official and concentration camp administrator (b. 1914)
- April 21
  - Nicole de Lamargé, French model (b. ~1930s)
  - Trisno Sumardjo, Indonesian writer, translator, and painter (b. 1916)
- April 26 – Morihei Ueshiba, Japanese martial artist and founder of aikido (b. 1883)
- April 27 – René Barrientos, Bolivian general and statesman, 47th President of Bolivia (helicopter crash) (b. 1919)
- April 28 - Marie-Louise Paris, French engineer who founded l'Institut électro-mécanique féminin in 1925 (b. 1889)

=== May ===
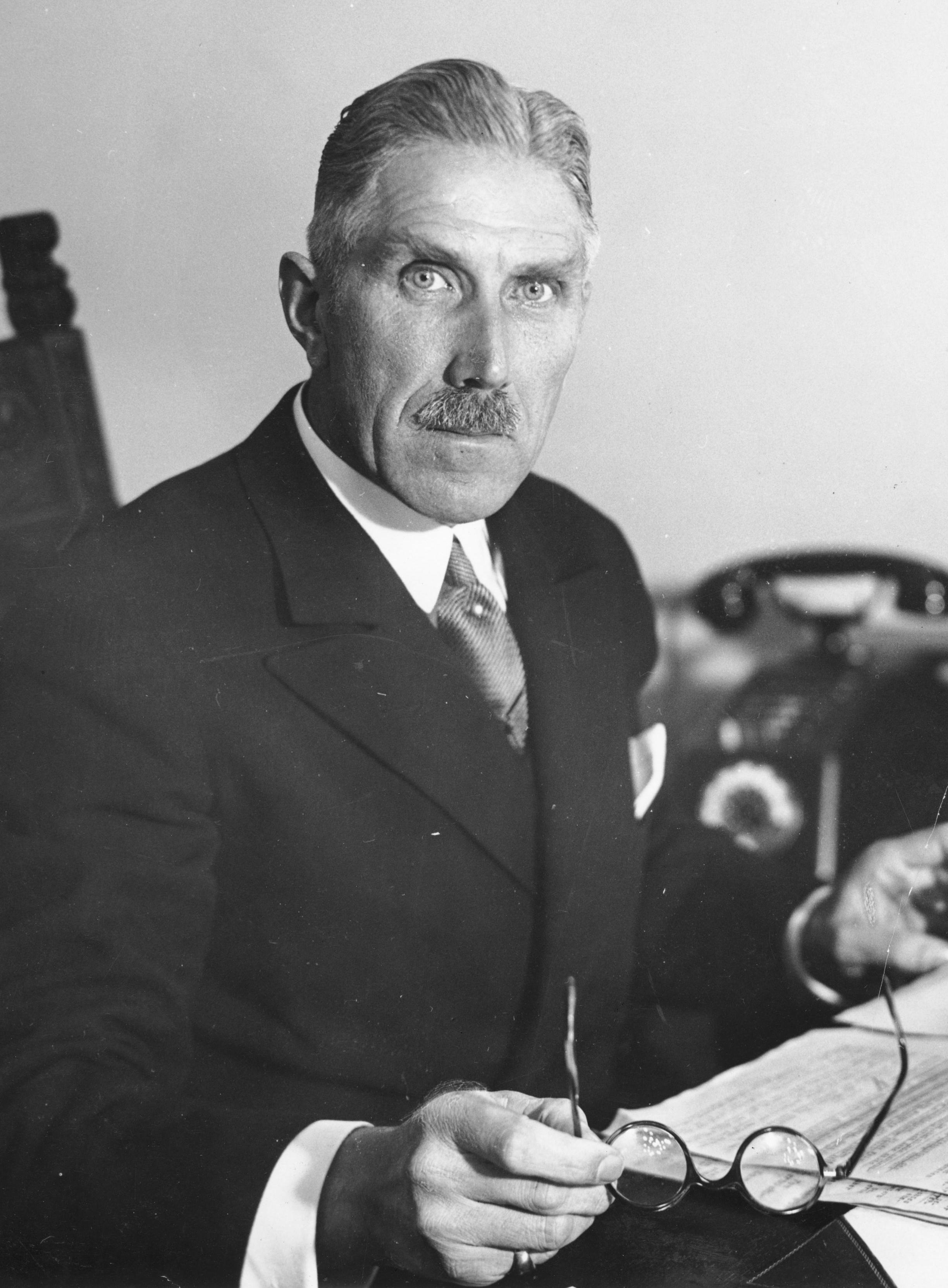
Franz von Papen

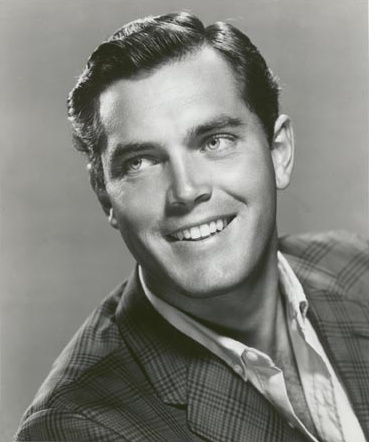
Jeffrey Hunter

- May 2 – Franz von Papen, 22nd Chancellor of Germany and 26th Prime Minister of Prussia (b. 1879)
- May 3
  - Karl Freund, German cinematographer (b. 1890)
  - Zakir Husain, Indian politician, 3rd President of India (b. 1897)
- May 4 – Sir Osbert Sitwell, English writer (b. 1892)
- May 14
  - Enid Bennett, American actress (b. 1893)
  - Frederick Lane, Australian swimmer (b. 1880)
- May 15 – Robert Rayford, American HIV/AIDS victim (b. 1953)
- May 18 – Camille Drevet, French anti-colonialist, feminist activist and pacifist (b. 1881)
- May 21 – William Lincoln Bakewell, American explorer (b. 1888)
- May 23 – Jimmy McHugh, American composer (b. 1894)
- May 24
  - Mitzi Green, American actress (b. 1920)
  - Fritz Skullerud, Norwegian long-distance runner and station master (b. 1885)
- May 26 – Paul Hawkins, Australian racing driver (b. 1937)
- May 27
  - Muhammad Fareed Didi, Sultan of Maldives (b. 1901)
  - Jeffrey Hunter, American actor (b. 1926)
- May 28 – Rhys Williams, Welsh actor (b. 1897)

=== June ===
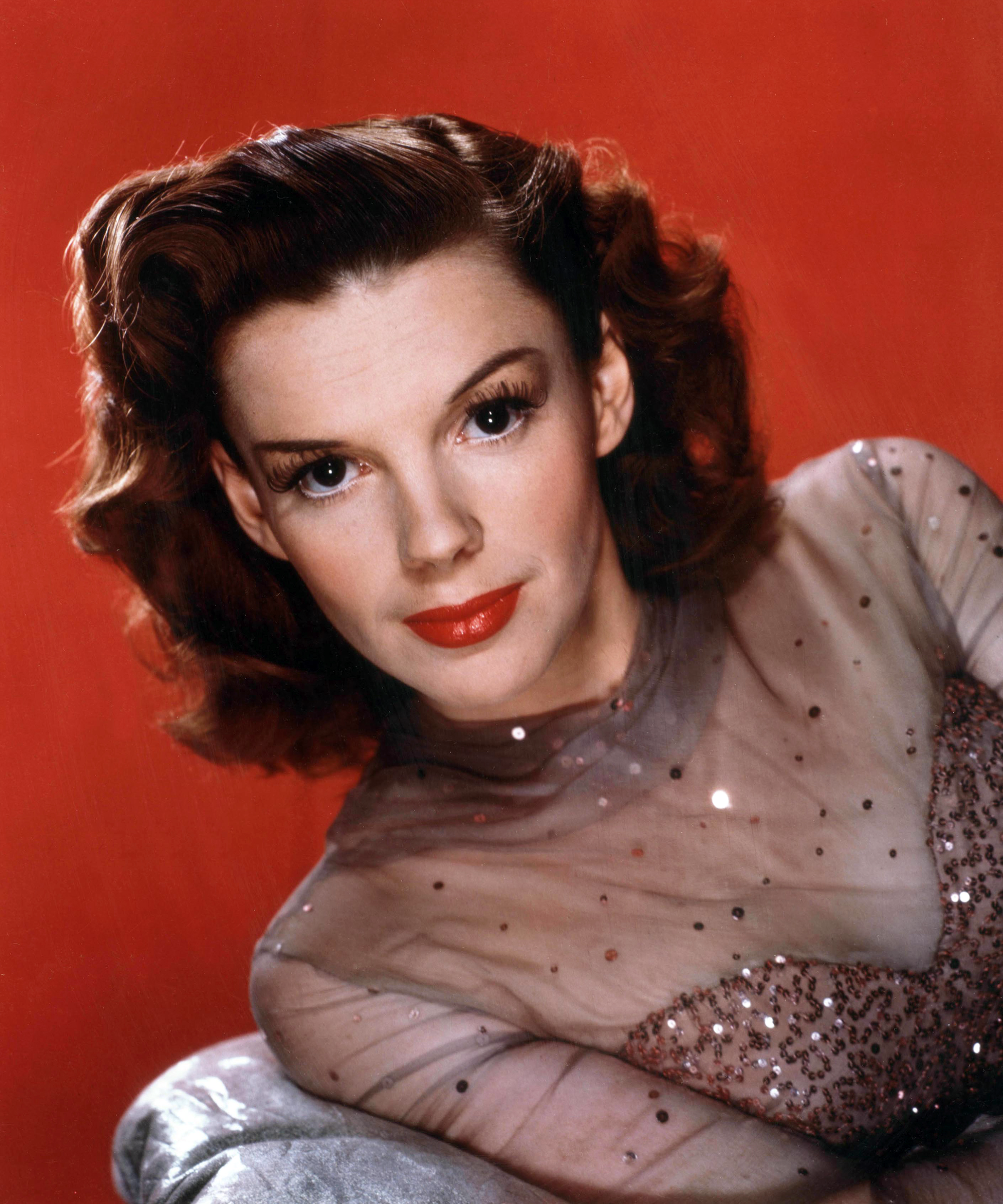
Judy Garland

- June 1 – Ivar Ballangrud, Norwegian Olympic speed skater (b. 1904)
- June 4 – Rafael Osuna, Mexican professional tennis player (b. 1938)
- June 8 – Robert Taylor, American actor (b. 1911)
- June 11 – John L. Lewis, President of the United Mine Workers of America (b. 1880)
- June 12 – Aleksandr Deyneka, Russian painter and sculptor (b. 1899)
- June 13 – Martita Hunt, Argentine-born British actress (b. 1899)
- June 14 – Wynonie Harris, American blues, rhythm and blues, singer (b. 1915)
- June 16 – Harold Alexander, 1st Earl Alexander of Tunis, British field marshal and 17th Governor General of Canada (b. 1891)
- June 18 – Edgar Anderson, American botanist (b. 1897)
- June 19 – Natalie Talmadge, American actress (b. 1896)
- June 20 – Mohamed Siddiq El-Minshawi, Egyptian Qur'anic reciter (b. 1920)
- June 22 – Judy Garland, American actress and singer (b. 1922)
- June 23 – Volmari Iso-Hollo, Finnish athlete (b. 1907)

=== July ===
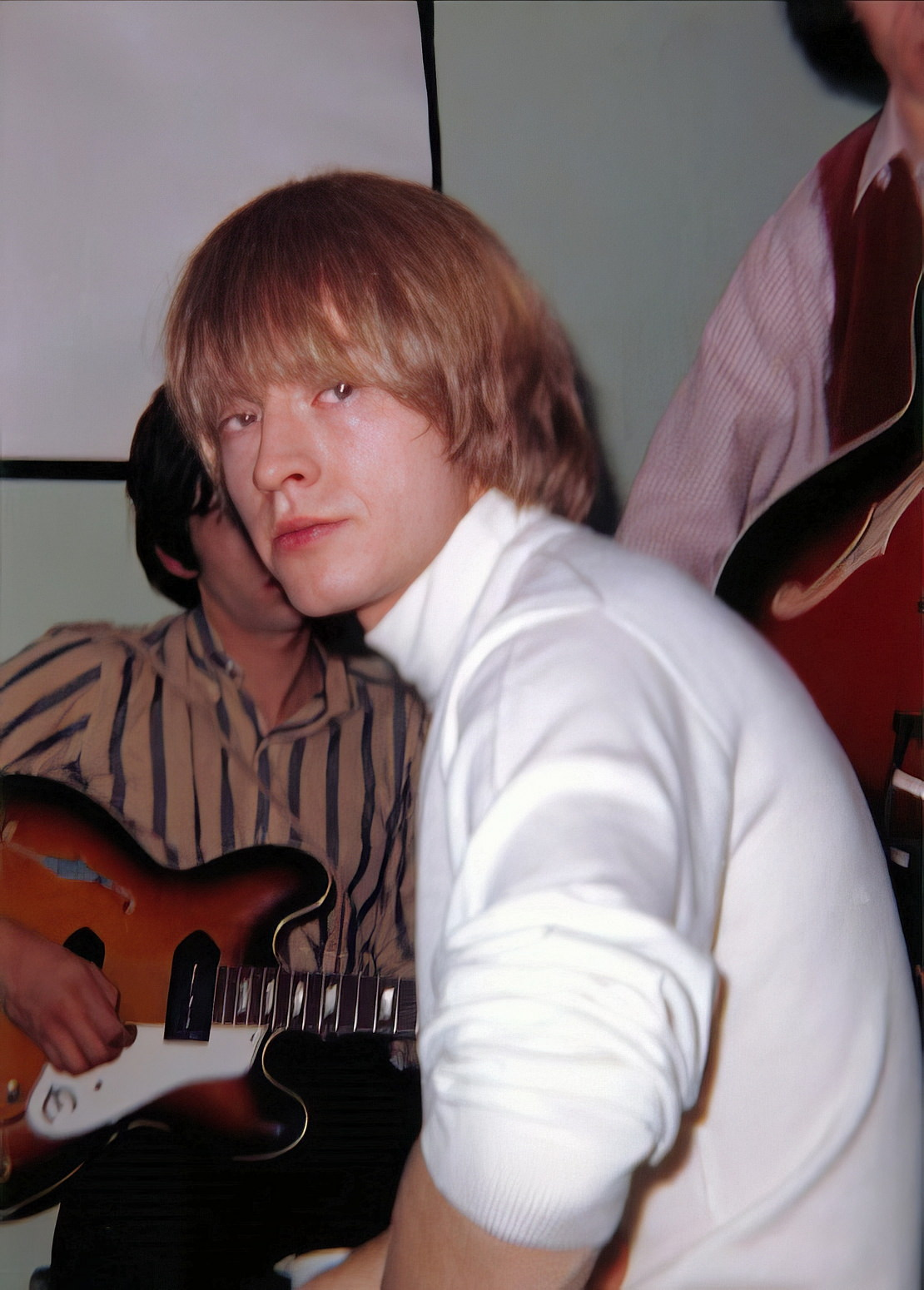
Brian Jones

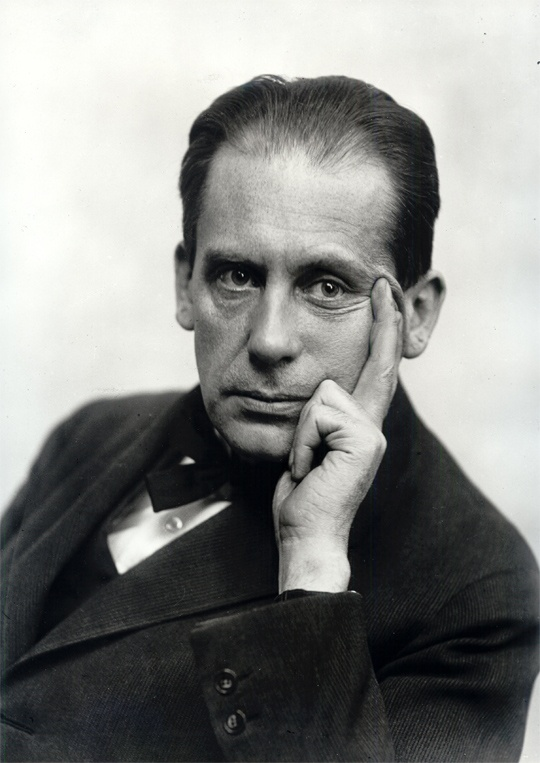
Walter Gropius

- July 2 – Mikio Naruse, Japanese film director (b. 1905)
- July 3 – Brian Jones, British rock musician (b. 1942)
- July 5
  - Ben Alexander, American actor (b. 1911)
  - Wilhelm Backhaus, German pianist (b. 1884)
  - Walter Gropius, German architect (b. 1883)
  - Lambert Hillyer, American film director (b. 1889)
  - Tom Mboya, Kenyan politician (b. 1930)
  - Leo McCarey, American film director (b. 1898)
- July 9 – Raizō Tanaka, Japanese admiral (b. 1892)
- July 15 – Peter van Eyck, German actor (b. 1911)
- July 17 – Ichikawa Raizō VIII, Japanese actor (b. 1931)
- July 24 – Witold Gombrowicz, Polish novelist and dramatist (b. 1904)
- July 25 – Otto Dix, German painter (b. 1891)
- July 28
  - Frank Loesser, American songwriter (b. 1910)
  - Ramón Grau, president of Cuba (b. 1882)

=== August ===
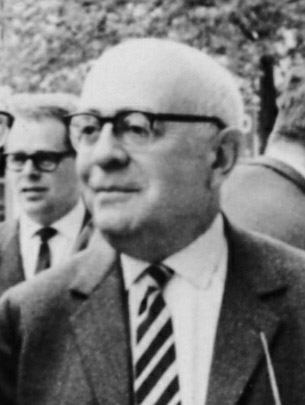
Theodor W. Adorno

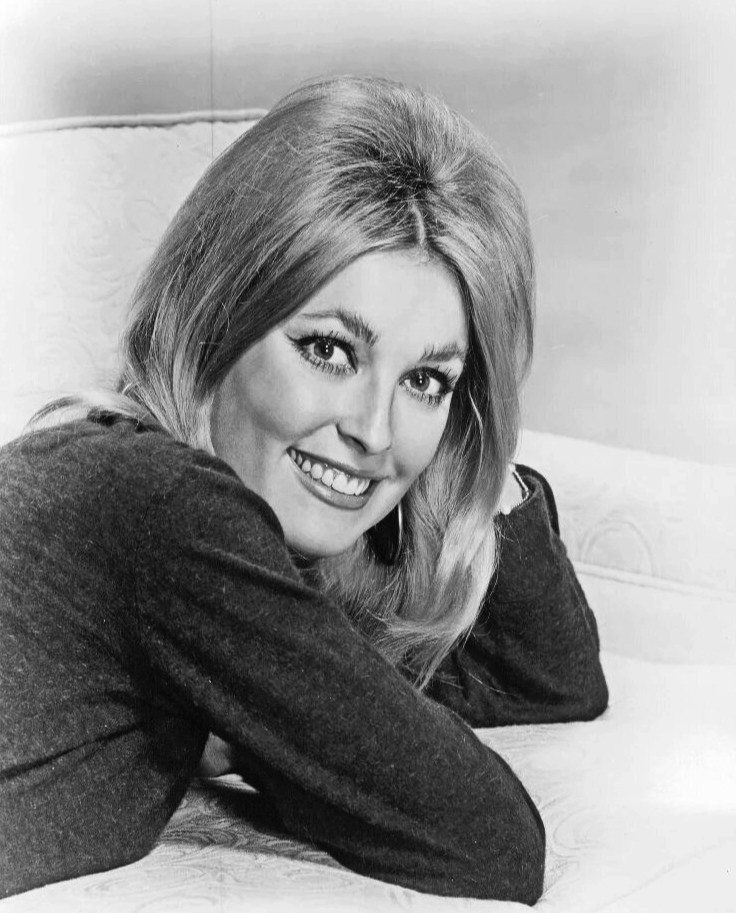
Sharon Tate

- August 5 – Duke Adolf Friedrich of Mecklenburg (b. 1873)
- August 6 – Theodor W. Adorno, German sociologist and philosopher (b. 1903)
- August 8 – Choi Seung-hee, Korean modern dancer (b. 1911)
- August 9
  - C. F. Powell, British physicist, Nobel Prize laureate (b. 1903)
  - Constantin Ion Parhon, Romanian politician (b. 1874)
  - Jay Sebring, American celebrity hair stylist (b. 1933)
  - Sharon Tate, American actress and model (b. 1943)
- August 13 – Nicolás Fasolino, Argentine Roman Catholic cardinal (b. 1887)
- August 14 – Leonard Woolf, English writer (b. 1880)
- August 17
  - Ludwig Mies van der Rohe, German-American architect (b. 1886)
  - Otto Stern, German physicist, Nobel Prize laureate (b. 1888)
- August 20 – Marty Barry, Canadian ice hockey player (b. 1905)
- August 26 – Ismail al-Azhari, 2nd Prime Minister, 3rd President of Sudan (b. 1900)
- August 27
  - Dame Ivy Compton-Burnett, English novelist (b. 1884)
  - Erika Mann, German writer (b. 1905)
- August 31 – Rocky Marciano, American professional boxer (b. 1923)

=== September ===
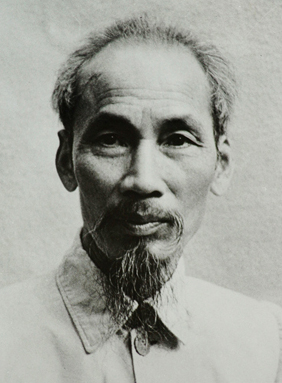
Ho Chi Minh

- September 2
  - Ho Chi Minh, Vietnamese Communist politician, 1st Prime Minister of North Vietnam and 1st President of North Vietnam (b. 1890)
  - Norman Manley, Premier of Jamaica (b. 1893)
- September 3 – John Lester, American cricketer (b. 1871)
- September 6 – Arthur Friedenreich, Brazilian footballer (b. 1892)
- September 8
  - Bud Collyer, American radio and television personality (b. 1908)
  - Alexandra David-Néel, French explorer (b. 1868)
- September 12 – Terry de la Mesa Allen, Sr., American general (b. 1888)
- September 19 – Rex Ingram, American actor (b. 1895)
- September 22
  - Adolfo López Mateos, Mexican politician, 48th President of Mexico, 1958-1964 (b. 1909)
  - Aleksandras Stulginskis, Lithuanian politician, 2nd President of the Republic of Lithuania (b. 1885)
- September 27 – Nicolas Grunitzky, 2nd President of Togo (b. 1913)
- September 28 – Nicolae Dăscălescu, Romanian general (b. 1884)

=== October ===
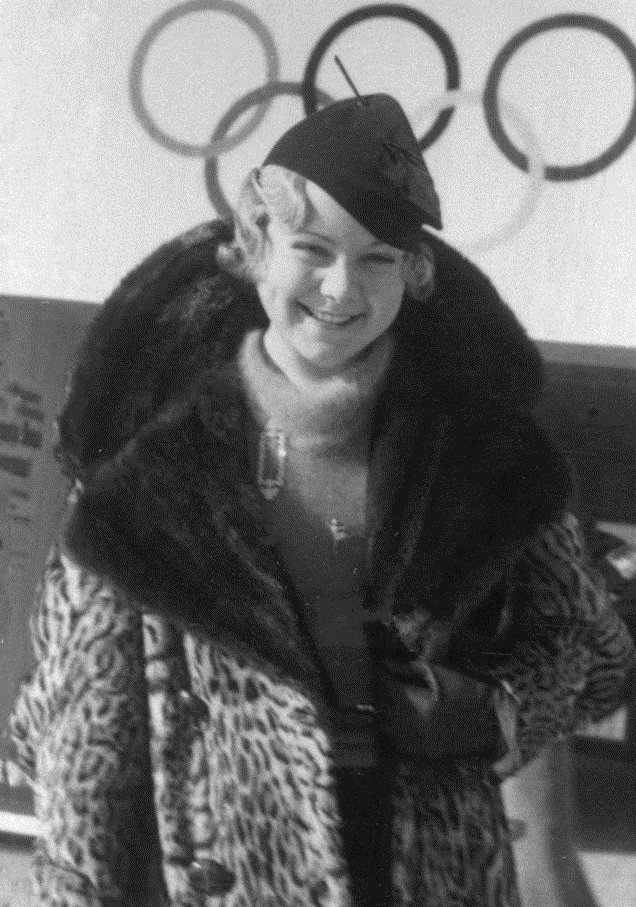
Sonja Henie

- October 3 – Skip James, American blues singer (b. 1902)
- October 6 – Walter Hagen, American golf champion (b. 1892)
- October 7
  - Natalya Lisenko, Russian actress (b. 1884)
  - Ture Nerman, Swedish communist leader (b. 1886)
- October 12 – Sonja Henie, Norwegian figure skater (b. 1912)
- October 16 – Leonard Chess, Polish-American record company executive, co-founder of Chess Records (b. 1917)
- October 21
  - Jack Kerouac, American author (b. 1922)
  - Wacław Sierpiński, Polish mathematician (b. 1882)
- October 22 – Vittorio Tur, Italian admiral (b. 1882)
- October 23 - Tommy Edwards, American singer-songwriter (b. 1922)
- October 26 – Gyula Mándi, Hungarian footballer and manager (b. 1899)
- October 29 – Francisco Orlich Bolmarcich, 34th President of Costa Rica (b. 1907)
- October 31 – Carlos Alberto Arroyo del Río, 26th President of Ecuador, leader during World War II (b. 1893)

=== November ===
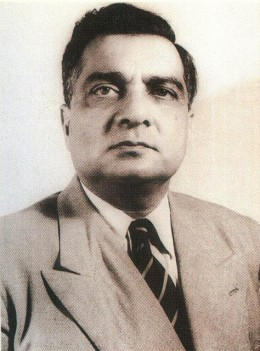
Iskander Mirza

- November 1 – Pauline Bush, American actress (b. 1886)
- November 5 – Lloyd Corrigan, American actor (b. 1900)
- November 8
  - Dave O'Brien, American actor (b. 1912)
  - Vesto M. Slipher, American astronomer (b. 1875)
- November 12
  - William F. Friedman, American cryptanalyst (b. 1891)
  - Liu Shaoqi, President of China (b. 1898)
- November 13 – Iskander Mirza, Pakistani politician, 1st President of Pakistan (b. 1899)
- November 18 – Joseph P. Kennedy Sr., American politician (b. 1888)
- November 21
  - Norman Lindsay, Australian painter (b. 1879)
  - Mutesa II of Buganda, Kabaka of Buganda and 1st President of Uganda (b. 1924)

=== December ===
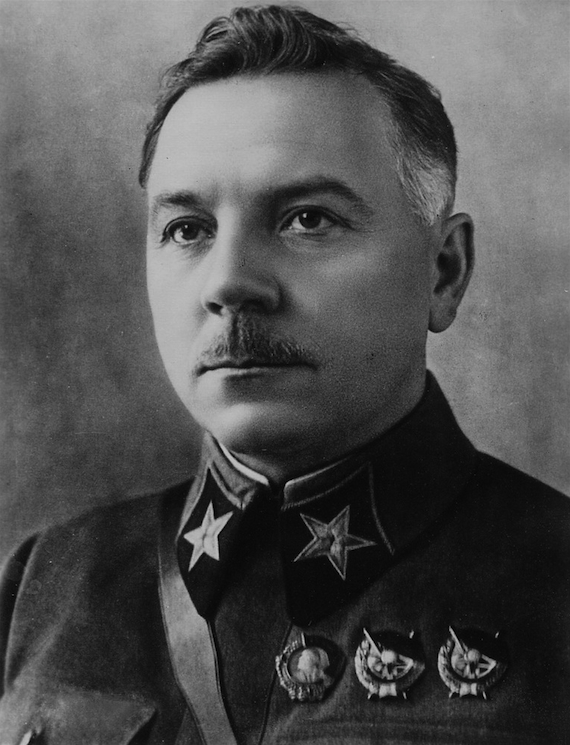
Kliment Voroshilov

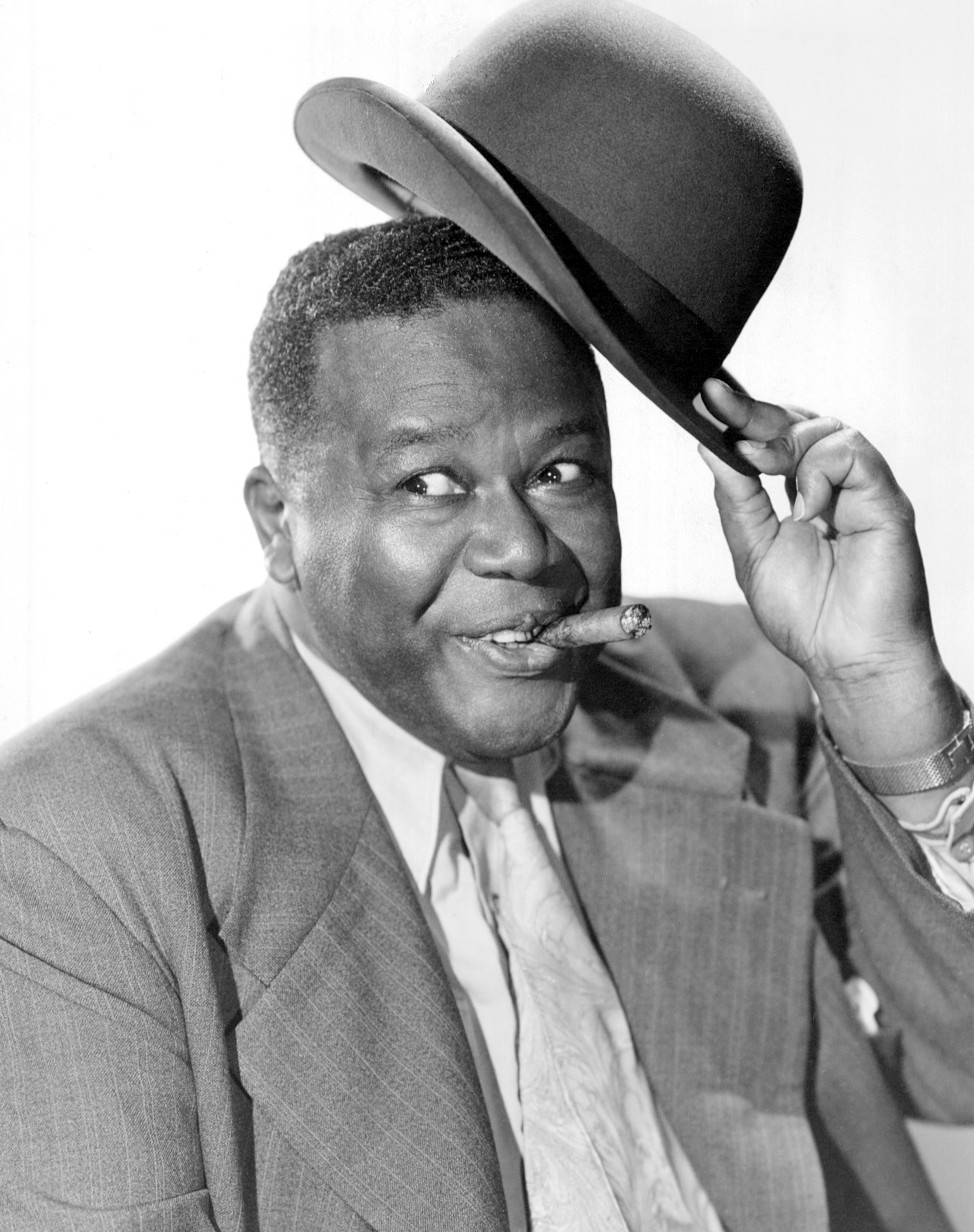
Spencer Williams Jr.

- December 1 – Magic Sam, American musician (b. 1937)
- December 2
  - José María Arguedas, Peruvian novelist, poet and anthropologist (b. 1911)
  - Kliment Voroshilov, Soviet military commander (b. 1881)
- December 4 – Fred Hampton, American political activist (b. 1948)
- December 5
  - Princess Alice of Battenberg (b. 1885)
  - Claude Dornier, German airplane builder, founder of Dornier Flugzeugwerke (b. 1884)
- December 6 – João Cândido, Brazilian sailor, led the Revolt of the Lash (b. 1880)
- December 7
  - Lefty O'Doul, American baseball player and restaurateur (b. 1897)
  - Eric Portman, English actor (b. 1901)
- December 8 – Karl Fiehler, German Nazi politician and mayor of Munich (b. 1895)
- December 13
  - Spencer Williams Jr., American actor (b. 1893)
  - Raymond A. Spruance, American admiral (b. 1886)
- December 20 – Adolfo Consolini, Italian discus thrower, Olympic champion (b. 1916)
- December 21 – Georges Catroux, French Army general and colonial governor (b. 1877)
- December 22
  - Josef von Sternberg, Austrian film director (b. 1894)
  - Enrique Peñaranda, Bolivian general, 38th President of Bolivia, leader during World War II (b. 1892)
- December 26 – Louise Lévêque de Vilmorin, French author (b. 1902)
- December 29 – Ricardo Adolfo de la Guardia Arango, 11th President of Panama, leader during World War II (b. 1899)

== Nobel Prizes ==
- Physics – Murray Gell-Mann
- Chemistry – Derek Barton, Odd Hassel
- Medicine – Max Delbrück, Alfred Hershey, Salvador Luria
- Literature – Samuel Beckett
- Peace – International Labour Organization
- Economics – Ragnar Frisch, Jan Tinbergen
