= Temirlan Anarbekov =

Kazakh footballer (born 2003)

Personal information
- Full name: Temırlan Anarbekūly Anarbekov
- Date of birth: 14 October 2003 (age 23)
- Place of birth: Atyrau, Kazakhstan
- Height: 1.89 m (6 ft 2 in)
- Position: Goalkeeper

Team information
- Current team: Kairat
- Number: 1

Youth career
- –2017: Atyrau
- 2017–2020: Kairat
- 2021: Kairat

Senior career*
Years	Team	Apps	(Gls)
2020–	Kairat	38	(0)
2020–2025	Kairat-Zhastar	55	(0)
2024	→ Zhenis (loan)	14	(0)

International career^{‡}
2020	Kazakhstan U17	1	(0)
2022	Kazakhstan U19	3	(0)
2023–2024	Kazakhstan U21	12	(0)
2025–	Kazakhstan	6	(0)
- * Club domestic league appearances and goals as of 1 November 2026 ‡ National team caps and goals as of 6 October 2026

Temırlan Anarbekūly Anarbekov (Kazakh: Темірлан Анарбекұлы Анарбеков; born 14 October 2003) is a Kazakh professional footballer who plays as a goalkeeper for Kazakhstan Premier League club Kairat and the Kazakhstan national team.

== Club career ==
Anarbekov joined the youth academy at Kairat in 2017 after leaving his hometown club Atyrau. He made three appearances during the 2021–22 UEFA Youth League for Kairat.

In 2020, he was promoted to the senior teams of Kairat and its feeder club Kairat-Zhastar, making his debut for Kairat on 30 November 2020 during the 1–0 loss against Taraz on the final matchday and his debut for Kairat-Zhastar came on during a 3–0 win against Shakhter-Bulat on 11 March 2021. He became Kairat's regular starting goalkeeper during Kazakhstan Cup matches.

He was loaned out to Zhenis for the 2024 season and he made his debut for Zhenis on 20 April 2024 during the 1–0 victory against Turan.

He featured as a second-half substitute against Celtic during the Champions League qualifying play-offs after Aleksandr Zarutskiy was injured during the same match on 20 August 2025. On 26 August, he saved three penalties in a 3–2 shootout victory against Celtic after two goalless draws, securing his club's qualification for their first-ever Champions League. A month later, on 14 September, Anarbekov was injured himself during the 1–0 victory against Aktobe after he broke his jaw and was substituted for Sherkhan Kalmurza during the first-half. He returned and played on 17 October during the 1–0 victory against Kyzylzhar. A few days later, on 21 October, he made his Champions League league phase debut in a goalless draw against Pafos.

He became the first-choice goalkeeper for Kairat after Alexander Zarutskiy left to join Aktobe in January 2026.

== International career ==
He represented Kazakhstan U19 during the 2025 UEFA European Under-19 Championship qualifying competition.

He was first called up to the senior Kazakhstan squad for a pair of UEFA Nations League matches against Norway and Austria in November 2024, and he made his debut on 4 September 2025 during the 1–0 loss against Wales during 2026 FIFA World Cup qualification.

== Career statistics ==
=== Club ===
As of match played 15 October 2026

Appearances and goals by club, season and competition
Club	Season	League			Kazakhstan Cup		Continental		Other		Total	
Club	Season	Division	Apps	Goals	Apps	Goals	Apps	Goals	Apps	Goals	Apps	Goals
Kairat (youth)	2021–22	N/A	—		—		3 (Note: Appearances in UEFA Youth League)	0	—		3	0
Kairat	2020	Kazakhstan Premier League	1	0	0	0	0	0	—		1	0
Kairat	2021	Kazakhstan Premier League	0	0	2	0	0	0	0	0	2	0
Kairat	2022	Kazakhstan Premier League	0	0	2	0	0	0	—		2	0
Kairat	2023	Kazakhstan Premier League	0	0	0	0	0	0	0	0	0	0
Kairat	2024	Kazakhstan Premier League	—		—		—		—		0	0
Kairat	2025	Kazakhstan Premier League	10	0	1	0	5 (Note: Appearances in UEFA Champions League)	0	0	0	16	0
Kairat	2026	Kazakhstan Premier League	25	0	0	0	10 (Note: Eight appearances in UEFA Champions League, one appearance in UEFA Europa League, one appearance in UEFA Conference League)	0	1 (Note: Appearance in Kazakhstan Super Cup)	0	35	0
Kairat	Total		36	0	6	0	15	0	1	0	58	0
Kairat-Zhastar	2020	Kazakhstan First League	0	0	—		—		—		0	0
Kairat-Zhastar	2021	Kazakhstan First League	14	0	—		—		—		14	0
Kairat-Zhastar	2022	Kazakhstan First League	20	0	—		—		—		20	0
Kairat-Zhastar	2023	Kazakhstan First League	19	0	—		—		—		19	0
Kairat-Zhastar	2024	Kazakhstan First League	0	0	—		—		—		0	0
Kairat-Zhastar	2025	Kazakhstan First League	8	0	0	0	—		—		8	0
Kairat-Zhastar	Total		61	0	0	0	—		—		61	0
Zhenis (loan)	2024	Kazakhstan Premier League	14	0	1	0	—		3 (Note: Appearances in Kazakhstan League Cup)	0	18	0
Career total			111	0	6	0	18	0	4	0	139	0

=== International ===
As of 6 October 2026.

Appearances and goals by national team and year
National team	Year	Apps	Goals
Kazakhstan	2025	2	0
Kazakhstan	2026	4	0
Total		6	0

== Honours ==
Kairat

- Kazakhstan Premier League: 2020, 2025
- Kazakhstan Cup: 2021
- Kazakhstan Super Cup: 2025; runner-up 2026

Individual

- Kazakhstan Premier League Goalkepper of the Year: 2025
