= 2026 FC Kairat season =

FC Kairat
2026 season
- Chairman: Kairat Boranbayev
- Manager: Rafael Urazbakhtin (until 26 October); Zhora Arutyunyan (acting) (from 26 October)
- Stadium: Central Stadium
- Premier League: 2nd
- Kazakhstan Cup: Round of 16
- Super Cup: Runners-up
- 2025–26 UEFA Champions League: League phase
- 2026–27 UEFA Champions League: Third qualifying round
- 2026–27 UEFA Europa League: Play-off round
- 2026–27 UEFA Conference League: League Phase
- Top goalscorer: League: Marc Gual (12); All: Marc Gual (13)
- Highest home attendance: 22,800 vs Aktobe (16 March 2026); 22,800 vs Astana (5 April 2026); 22,800 vs Kyzylzhar (17 June 2026); 22,800 vs Ordabasy (26 July 2026)
- Lowest home attendance: 300 vs Ulytau (15 August 2026)
- Average home league attendance: 14,786 (18 October 2026)
Home colours	Away colours	Third colours

The 2026 FC Kairat season is the 16th successive season that the club played in the Kazakhstan Premier League, the highest tier of association football in Kazakhstan, since their promotion back to the top flight in 2009.

== Season events ==
On 15 December 2025, Kairat announced the signing of Jaakko Oksanen from KuPS, on a contract until 31 December 2027, commencing on 1 January 2026.

On 16 January, Kairat announced the signing of Lucas Áfrico from Vanspor, on a contract until the end of the 2026 season.

On 17 January, Kairat announced the signing of Sebastián Zeballos from Real Oruro, on a contract until the end of the 2027 season.

On 25 January, Kairat announced that they had extended their contract with Aleksandr Mrynskiy until the 30 November 2028.

On 26 January, Kairat announced that they had extended their contract with Sherkhan Kalmurza until the 30 November 2028. The following day, 27 January, Kairat announced that they had extended their contract with Temirlan Anarbekov until the 30 November 2028.

On 29 January, Kairat announced that Valery Gromyko and Yegor Sorokin had left the club following the expiration of their contracts.

On 30 January, Kairat announced that Jug Stanojev had left the club on a permanent transfer to sign for Universitatea Cluj.

On 11 February, Kairat announced the signing of Oiva Jukkola from Ilves, on a contract until the end of the 2027 season.

On 24 February, Kairat announced that both Egor Tkachenko and Yan Trufanov had left the club in order to sign for Atyrau.

On 1 March, Kairat announced that Olzhas Baybek had extended his contract with the club until the end of 2028.

On 12 May, Kairat announced that Ricardinho had left the club after his loan deal was ended early.

On 12 June, Kairat announced the signing of Marc Gual from Rio Ave, on a contract until the end of 2027.

On 8 July, Kairat announced that Dan Glazer had left the club to sign for Maccabi Tel Aviv.

On 16 July, Kairat announced the signing of Gustavo Mendonça from AVS, on a contract until the end of the 2029 season.

On 18 July, Kairat announced that Sebastián Zeballos had left the club by mutual agreement.

On 26 October, Kairat announced that Rafael Urazbakhtin had resigned from his role as Head Coach, with Zhora Arutyunyan being appointed as acting Head Coach.

== Squad ==
As of match played 31 October 2026

No.	Name	Nationality	Position	Date of birth (age)	Signed from	Signed in	Contract ends	Apps.	Goals
Goalkeepers
1	Temirlan Anarbekov	(Kazakhstan)	GK	14 October 2003 (age 23)	Academy	2020	2028	60	0
30	Danila Book	(Kazakhstan)	GK	20 April 2008 (age 18)	Academy	2025		1	0
82	Sherkhan Kalmurza	(Kazakhstan)	GK	15 June 2007 (age 19)	Academy	2025	2028	10	0
98	Bakhtiyar Aldashev	(Kazakhstan)	GK	12 February 2008 (age 18)	Academy	2025		1	0
Defenders
3	Luís Mata	(Portugal)	DF	6 July 1997 (age 29)	Zagłębie Lubin	2025		77	3
4	Damir Kasabulat	(Kazakhstan)	DF	29 August 2002 (age 24)	Kairat Moscow	2022	2027	142	0
5	Lev Kurgin	(Kazakhstan)	DF	6 June 2002 (age 24)	Kairat Moscow	2022		74	0
14	Alyaksandr Martynovich	(Belarus)	DF	26 August 1987 (age 39)	Rubin Kazan	2024	2025	86	7
20	Yerkin Tapalov	(Kazakhstan)	DF	3 September 1993 (age 33)	Tobol	2025	2025 (+1)	65	1
21	Amirbek Bazarbaev	(Kazakhstan)	DF	2 January 2007 (age 19)	Academy	2025		2	0
25	Aleksandr Shirobokov	(Kazakhstan)	DF	2 January 2003 (age 23)	Academy	2020		73	1
32	Adlan Nurgaliev	(Kazakhstan)	DF	26 January 2007 (age 19)	Academy	2025		3	0
35	Sanat Nurbolat	(Kazakhstan)	DF	22 September 2008 (age 18)	Academy	2025		1	0
44	Lucas Áfrico	(Brazil)	DF	5 February 1995 (age 31)	Vanspor	2026	2026	25	2
59	Daniyar Tashpulatov	(Kazakhstan)	DF	22 August 2007 (age 19)	Academy	2025		6	0
73	Akezhan Kalikulov	(Kazakhstan)	DF	2 April 2008 (age 18)	Academy	2025		1	0
75	Raimbek Kenesbekov	(Kazakhstan)	DF	30 January 2008 (age 18)	Academy	2025		1	0
Midfielders
6	Adilet Sadybekov	(Kazakhstan)	MF	26 May 2002 (age 24)	Academy	2021	2025	106	8
8	Olzhas Baybek	(Kazakhstan)	MF	11 February 2005 (age 21)	Academy	2024	2028	47	2
13	Jaakko Oksanen	(Finland)	MF	7 November 2000 (age 25)	KuPS	2026	2027	38	4
19	Oiva Jukkola	(Finland)	MF	21 May 2002 (age 24)	Ilves	2026	2027	39	6
22	Gustavo Mendonça	(Portugal)	MF	11 March 2003 (age 23)	AVS	2026	2029	19	0
24	Aleksandr Mrynsky	(Kazakhstan)	MF	15 July 2004 (age 22)	Academy	2022	2028	90	3
27	Mukhamedali Abish	(Kazakhstan)	MF	22 October 2007 (age 19)	Academy	2026		5	0
37	Evgeniy Petrik	(Kazakhstan)	MF	31 May 2008 (age 18)	Academy	2025		2	1
57	Shyngys Duysenbek	(Kazakhstan)	MF	13 January 2006 (age 20)	Academy	2023		2	0
71	Karim Makhametzhan	(Kazakhstan)	MF	11 October 2007 (age 19)	Academy	2025		1	0
78	Alamgir Smakov	(Kazakhstan)	MF	28 May 2008 (age 18)	Academy	2026		2	0
Forwards
7	Jorginho	(Portugal)	FW	9 November 1997 (age 28)	Differdange 03	2025	2026	68	22
9	Edmilson	(Brazil)	FW	19 April 1997 (age 29)	Celje	2025	2027	59	15
15	Mansur Birkurmanov	(Kazakhstan)	FW	4 April 2007 (age 19)	Academy	2026		11	0
17	Azamat Tuyakbaev	(Kazakhstan)	FW	13 July 2007 (age 19)	Academy	2025		34	7
23	Ramazan Bagdat	(Kazakhstan)	FW	9 October 2006 (age 20)	Academy	2025		25	3
28	Marc Gual	(Spain)	FW	13 March 1996 (age 30)	Rio Ave	2026	2027	27	14
76	Ermukhammad Kerimkhan	(Kazakhstan)	FW	4 April 2008 (age 18)	Academy	2026		1	0
81	Ismail Bekbolat	(Kazakhstan)	FW	10 January 2008 (age 18)	Academy	2025		35	3
Players away on loan
Left during the season
10	Dastan Satpayev	(Kazakhstan)	FW	12 August 2008 (age 18)	Academy	2024		58	26
11	Sebastián Zeballos	(Argentina)	MF	17 July 2001 (age 25)	Real Oruro	2026	2027	11	0
18	Dan Glazer	(Israel)	MF	20 September 1996 (age 30)	Pari NN	2025	2026	41	0
33	Jug Stanojev	(Serbia)	MF	29 July 1999 (age 27)	Spartak Subotica	2024	2027	48	3
55	Valery Gromyko	(Belarus)	MF	23 January 1997 (age 29)	Kaisar	2024	2025	57	7
80	Yegor Sorokin	(Russia)	DF	4 November 1995 (age 30)	Unattached	2024	2025	54	2
99	Ricardinho	(Brazil)	FW	23 April 2001 (age 25)	on loan from Viktoria Plzeň	2025	2026	32	3
	Egor Tkachenko	(Kazakhstan)	DF	14 April 2003 (age 23)	Kairat Moscow	2022		39	0
	Yan Trufanov	(Kazakhstan)	FW	17 May 2004 (age 22)	Academy	2022		20	4

== Transfers ==
=== In ===
Date	Position	Nationality	Name	From	Fee	Ref.
15 December 2025 (Note: Transfer announced on the shown date, becoming official on 1 January 2026.)	MF	(Finland)	Jaakko Oksanen	KuPS	Undisclosed	
16 January 2026	DF	(Brazil)	Lucas Áfrico	Vanspor	Undisclosed	
17 January 2026	MF	(Argentina)	Sebastián Zeballos	Real Oruro	Undisclosed	
11 February 2026	MF	(Finland)	Oiva Jukkola	Ilves	Undisclosed	
12 June 2026	FW	(Spain)	Marc Gual	Rio Ave	Undisclosed	
16 July 2026	MF	(Portugal)	Gustavo Mendonça	AVS	Undisclosed	

=== Loans in ===
Date from	Position	Nationality	Name	From	Date to	Ref.
19 June 2025	FW	(Brazil)	Ricardinho	Viktoria Plzeň	12 May 2026	

=== Out ===
Date	Position	Nationality	Name	To	Fee	Ref.
17 January 2026	FW	(Kazakhstan)	Gleb Valgushev	Kyzylzhar	Undisclosed	
30 January 2026	MF	(Serbia)	Jug Stanojev	Universitatea Cluj	Undisclosed	
24 February 2026	DF	(Kazakhstan)	Egor Tkachenko	Atyrau	Undisclosed	
24 February 2026	FW	(Kazakhstan)	Yan Trufanov	Atyrau	Undisclosed	
8 July 2026	MF	(Israel)	Dan Glazer	Maccabi Tel Aviv	Undisclosed	

=== Released ===
Date	Position	Nationality	Name	Joined	Date	Ref.
5 January 2026	FW	(Brazil)	Élder Santana	Zhenis	30 March 2026	
6 January 2026	MF	(Georgia (country))	Giorgi Zaria	Dinamo Tbilisi	6 March 2026	
7 January 2026	DF	(Israel)	Ofri Arad	FCSB	20 January 2026	
29 January 2026	DF	(Russia)	Yegor Sorokin	Chengdu Rongcheng	5 February 2026	
29 January 2026	MF	(Belarus)	Valery Gromyko	Maxline Vitebsk	9 February 2026	
18 July 2026	MF	(Argentina)	Sebastián Zeballos	Deportivo La Guaira	29 July 2026	

== Friendlies ==
7 February 2026	Pakhtakor	1–1	Kairat	Antalya, Turkey
19:00 UZT (UTC+5)	Resan 50'	Report	Shirobokov 24'

13 February 2026	Kairat	1–0	Orenburg	Antalya, Turkey
19:00 (UTC+5)	Goal	Report

19 February 2026	Kairat	3–4	Pari NN	Antalya, Turkey
13:00 (UTC+5)	Birkurmanov; Ricardinho	Report	Goal

19 February 2026	Kairat	1–0	Pari NN	Antalya, Turkey
19:00 (UTC+5)	Goal	Report

28 March 2026	Zenit St.Petersburg	2–0	Kairat	Saint Petersburg
21:00 (UTC+5)	Nino 12'; Sobolev 21'	Report		Stadium: Krestovsky Stadium

== Competitions ==
=== Overview ===
Competition	First match	Last match	Starting round	Final position	Record							
Competition	First match	Last match	Starting round	Final position	Pld	W	D	L	GF	GA	GD	Win %
Premier League	7 March 2026	31 October 2026	Matchday 1		30	19	8	3	60	23	+37	63.33
Super Cup	28 February 2026	28 February 2026	Final	Runnersup	1	0	1	0	2	2	+0	0.00
Kazakhstan Cup	8 April 2026	29 April 2026	Round of 32	Round of 16	2	1	0	1	4	3	+1	50.00
2025–26 UEFA Champions League	20 January 2026	29 January 2026	2025 season	League Phase (36th)	2	0	0	2	3	7	−4	0.00
2026–27 UEFA Champions League	8 July 2026	11 August 2026	First qualifying round	Third qualifying round	6	3	0	3	5	4	+1	50.00
2026–27 UEFA Europa League	20 August 2026	27 August 2026	Play-off round	Play-off round	2	0	0	2	0	6	−6	0.00
2026–27 UEFA Conference League	15 October 2026		League phase		2	0	1	1	2	6	−4	0.00
Total					45	23	10	12	76	51	+25	51.11

Last updated: 31 October 2026
Source: Competitions

=== 2025–26 UEFA Champions League ===
==== League Phase ====
Pos	Team	Pld	W	D	L	GF	GA	GD	Pts
32	(Royal Dutch Football Association) Ajax	8	2	0	6	8	21	−13	6
33	(German Football Association) Eintracht Frankfurt	8	1	1	6	10	21	−11	4
34	(Football Association of the Czech Republic) Slavia Prague	8	0	3	5	5	19	−14	3
35	(Royal Spanish Football Federation) Villarreal	8	0	1	7	5	18	−13	1
36	(Kazakhstan Football Federation) Kairat	8	0	1	7	7	22	−15	1

Source: UEFA
Rules for classification: League phase tiebreakers

20 January 2026 7	Kairat (Kazakhstan)	1–4	(Belgium) Club Brugge	Astana, Kazakhstan
20:30 (UTC+5)	Sorokin (yellow card) 80'; Sadybekov 90+2' (yellow card) 90+2'	Report	Stanković 32'; Vanaken 38'; Vermant 74'; Mechele 84'	Stadium: Astana Arena; Attendance: 11,324; Referee: Donatas Rumšas (Lithuania)
Note: Match played at the Astana Arena in Astana instead of Kairat's regular Central Stadium in Almaty.

29 January 2026 8	Arsenal (England)	3–2	(Kazakhstan) Kairat	London, England
01:00 (UTC+5)	Gyökeres 3'; Calafiori (yellow card) 6'; Havertz 15'; Martinelli 36'	Report	Jorginho 7' (pen.) (yellow card) 69'; Ricardinho 90+4'	Stadium: Emirates Stadium; Attendance: 50,200; Referee: Urs Schnyder (Switzerland)

=== Super Cup ===
28 February 2026	Kairat	2–2 (4 – 5 p)	Tobol	Astana
18:00 (UTC+5)	Tapalov (yellow card) 13'; Mrynskiy 20'; Jorginho (penalty missed) 25'; Oksanen 26'; Edmilson (yellow card) 73'	Report	Guerra 6'; Cavnić (yellow card) 24'; Marat (yellow card) 62'; Tagybergen (yellow card) 68' (goal) 89'; Zhumat (yellow card) 82'	Stadium: Astana Arena; Attendance: 15,546; Referee: Denis Tevyashov
	Penalties
	Ricardinho (penalty missed); Oksanen (penalty scored); Kasabulat (penalty scored); Baybek (penalty scored); Satpayev (penalty scored)		(penalty scored) Zhumashev; (penalty scored) Asrankulov; (penalty scored) Tagybergen; (penalty scored) Ndiaye; (penalty scored) Zhumat

=== Premier League ===
==== Results summary ====
Overall								Home						Away					
Pld	W	D	L	GF	GA	GD	Pts	W	D	L	GF	GA	GD	W	D	L	GF	GA	GD
30	19	8	3	60	23	+37	65	10	4	1	34	10	+24	9	4	2	26	13	+13

Last updated: 31 October 2026.
Source: See Results

==== Results by round ====
Round	1	2	3	4	5	25	7	8	20	22	10	11	12	13	17	14	16	15	18	19	9	24	6	21	26	27	28	23	29	30
Ground	A	H	A	H	A	H	H	A	A	A	A	H	A	H	H	A	A	H	A	H	H	A	A	H	H	A	H	H	A	H
Result	W	W	D	W	D	W	D	W	W	D	W	D	L	D	W	W	W	W	W	W	W	W	W	W	L	L	W	W	D	D
Position	4	1	4	1	1	1	1	1	1	1	1	1	2	2	2	2	2	2	2	1	2	2	2	2	2	2	2	2	2	2

Source: See Results
A = Away; H = Home; W = Win; D = Draw; L = Loss; P = Bye

==== Results ====
7 March 2026 1	Altai	0–1	Kairat	Almaty
16:00 (UTC+5)	Nazimkhanov (yellow card) 29'	Report	Kasabulat (yellow card) 49'; Glazer (yellow card) 56'; Jorginho 64' (yellow card) 85'	Stadium: Khan-Tengri Stadium; Attendance: 2,700; Referee: Sergey Nozhenko

16 March 2026 2	Kairat	1–0	Aktobe	Almaty
19:00 (UTC+5)	Áfrico (yellow card) 37'; Jukkola (yellow card) 61'; Satpayev 76'; Tapalov (yellow card) 84'; Kasabulat (yellow card) 90+2'	Report	Yerlanov (yellow card) 45+3'; Zeljković (yellow card) 50'; Shushenachev (yellow card) 84'; Trofimets (yellow card) 90+8'	Stadium: Central Stadium; Attendance: 22,800; Referee: Sanzhar Iskakov

21 March 2026 3	Zhetysu	0–0	Kairat	Almaty
16:00 (UTC+5)	Orynbasar (yellow card) 2'; Pajovic (yellow card) 34'; Kashken (yellow card) 83'	Report	Mata (yellow card) 63' (yellow-red card) 64'; Jorginho (yellow card) 83'	Stadium: Khan-Tengri Stadium; Attendance: 2,700; Referee: Sayat Sulikanov

5 April 2026 4	Kairat	4–0	Astana	Almaty
18:00 (UTC+5)	Jorginho 10', 41'; Satpayev 22'; Martynovich 45+1'; Oksanen (yellow card) 77'	Report	Shomko (yellow card) 5'; Karaman (yellow card) 74'	Stadium: Central Stadium; Attendance: 22,800; Referee: Denis Tevyashov

11 April 2026 5	Tobol	1–1	Kairat	Kostanay
17:00 (UTC+5)	Milovanović 13'; Guerra (yellow card) 35'; Marochkin (yellow card) 40'; Tagybergen (yellow card) 53'; Zhumashev (yellow card) 56'; Cavnić (yellow card) 73'; Marat (yellow card) 90'	Report	Satpayev 19'; Oksanen (yellow card) 63'	Stadium: Central Stadium; Attendance: 3,000; Referee: Alexander Zatula

18 April 2026 25	Kairat	2–0	Caspiy	Almaty
18:00 (UTC+5)	Edmilson 55'; Jorginho 82'	Report	Aripov (yellow card) 25'; Taykenov (yellow card) 39'	Stadium: Central Stadium; Attendance: 14,275; Referee: Anton Kuchma

26 April 2026 7	Kairat	2–2	Yelimay	Almaty
18:00 (UTC+5)	Jukkola 61'; Edmilson 64'	Report	Fessou 12'; Tyulyubay (yellow card) 19'; Miladinović (yellow card) 58'; Ashirbek 90'	Stadium: Central Stadium; Attendance: 21,465; Referee: Bulat Sariev

2 May 2026 8	Irtysh Pavlodar	0–1	Kairat	Pavlodar
17:00 (UTC+5)	Zharynbetov (yellow card) 79'; Shimamura (yellow card) 82'	Report	Martynovich (yellow card) 2'; Jukkola 25' (yellow card) 38'; Jorginho (yellow card) 44'	Stadium: Central Stadium; Attendance: 2,900; Referee: Sayat Karabaev

6 May 2026 20	Kaisar	1–2	Kairat	Kyzylorda
19:00 (UTC+5)	Abiken (yellow card) 58' (goal) 71'; Salaidin (yellow card) 76'; Moses (yellow card) 79'	Report	Satpayev 2' (penalty missed) 77'; Jukkola (yellow card) 13'; Mrynsky (yellow card) 17'; Oksanen (yellow card) 54' (red card) 79'; Martynovich (yellow card) 61' (goal) 88'; Bagdat (yellow card) 78'	Stadium: Gani Muratbayev Stadium; Attendance: 11,000; Referee: Aydin Tasybaev

10 May 2026 22	Ulytau	1–1	Kairat	Jezkazgan
16:00 (UTC+5)	Malikaydar (yellow card) 57'; Chalkin (yellow card) 67' (goal) 83'; Bugulov (yellow card) 70'	Report	Satpayev 33'; Glazer (yellow card) 41'; Sadybekov (red card) 45+2'; Anarbekov (yellow card) 65'; Mata (yellow card) 83'	Stadium: Metallurg Stadium; Attendance: 6,000; Referee: Anton Kuchma

17 May 2026 10	Zhenis	1–2	Kairat	Astana
17:00 (UTC+5)	Khaseyn (yellow card) 27'; Tursynbay (yellow card) 63'; Shirobokov 88' (o.g.)	Report	Jukkola 52'; Jorginho 65'; Anarbekov (yellow card) 86'	Stadium: Astana Arena; Attendance: 10,500; Referee: Ruslan Sultangaliev

23 May 2026 11	Kairat	0–0	Kaisar	Almaty
18:00 (UTC+5)	Martynovich (yellow card) 16'; Jorginho (yellow card) 33'; Oksanen (yellow card) 35'	Report	Idrisov (yellow card) 1'; Miqueias (yellow card) 64'; Kenesbek (yellow card) 76'; Sovet (yellow card) 90+1'	Stadium: Central Stadium; Attendance: 16,289; Referee: Marat Iskakov

28 May 2026 12	Ordabasy	2–1	Kairat	Shymkent
20:00 (UTC+5)	Kilama 28' (yellow card) 76'; Căpățînă (yellow card) 49'; Astanov 64' (yellow card) 64'; Natel (yellow card) 69'	Report	Jorginho 14'; Glazer (yellow card) 40'	Stadium: Kazhymukan Munaitpasov Stadium; Attendance: 16,882; Referee: Bulat Sariev

13 June 2026 13	Kairat	1–1	Atyrau	Almaty
18:00 (UTC+5)	Oksanen 13'; Nurgaliev (yellow card) 89'	Report	Noyok (yellow card) 27'; Abdulla 69'; Kalmuratov (yellow card) 90+3'	Stadium: Central Stadium; Attendance: 14,164; Referee: Sayat Sulikanov

17 June 2026 17	Kairat	3–0	Kyzylzhar	Almaty
19:00 (UTC+5)	Jukkola (yellow card) 43'; Satpayev 59', 87'; Bekbolat 85'	Report	Adil (yellow card) 11'; Beugre (yellow card) 39'; Sokolenko (yellow card) 71'	Stadium: Central Stadium; Attendance: 22,800; Referee: Alexander Zatula

21 June 2026 14	Kyzylzhar	2–4	Kairat	Petropavl
18:00 (UTC+5)	Krajišnik (yellow card) 4'; Bahoken 22'; Muldinov (yellow card) 29'; Beugre 39' (yellow card) 81'; Makarenko (yellow card) 41'; Kozlenko (yellow card) 47'; Kerimzhanov (yellow card) 70' (yellow-red card) 77'; Pertsukh (yellow card) 80'	Report	Oksanen 9'; Gual 13'; Edmilson (yellow card) 45+1'; Jorginho (yellow card) 45+4' (goal) 78'; Áfrico (yellow card) 85'; Mata 90+2'	Stadium: Karasai Stadium; Attendance: 4,100; Referee: Denis Tevyashov

27 June 2026 16	Okzhetpes	1–3	Kairat	Kokshetau
17:00 (UTC+5)	Abdumannonov 23'; Lototskyi (yellow card) 59'; Mukhametkhanov (yellow card) 82'	Report	Áfrico (yellow card) 8' (goal) 57'; Jorginho (yellow card) 11'; Jukkola 15'; Edmilson (yellow card) 90+3' (goal) 90+5'	Stadium: Okzhetpes Stadium; Attendance: 3,526; Referee: Sayat Karabaev

2 July 2026 15	Kairat	5–0	Okzhetpes	Almaty
19:00 (UTC+5)	Gual 30', 36'; Jorginho 42'; Oksanen (yellow card) 70'; Martynovich (yellow card) 78'; Edmilson 79'; Tuyakbaev 90'	Report		Stadium: Central Stadium; Attendance: 8,543; Referee: Daniyar Sakhi

18 July 2026 18	Atyrau	1–3	Kairat	Turkistan
19:00 (UTC+5)	Maksimović (yellow card) 37'; Devens 70'	Report	Prce 8' (o.g.); Edmilson 15', 24'; Baybek (yellow card) 69'	Stadium: Turkestan Arena; Attendance: 5,500; Referee: Aydin Tasybaev

26 July 2026 19	Kairat	2–1	Ordabasy	Almaty
19:00 (UTC+5)	Gual 14'; Áfrico (yellow card) 47'; Martynovich (yellow card) 57'; Jukkola 87'	Report	Natel (yellow card) 67'; Johnsen (yellow card) 81' (goal) 90+2'	Stadium: Central Stadium; Attendance: 22,800; Referee: Daniyar Sakhi

15 August 2026 9	Kairat	3–1	Ulytau	Almaty
18:00 (UTC+5)	Edmilson 32' (yellow card) 59'; Jukkola 53'; Gual (yellow card) 72'; Tuyakbaev 74'; Nurgaliev (yellow card) 88'	Report	Carmona (yellow card) 44'; Nursultanov (yellow card) 81'; Chernyak 90+7'; Chalkin (yellow card) 90+8'	Stadium: Timur Segizbayev Youth Academy; Attendance: 300; Referee: Sayat Karabaev

31 August 2026 24	Yelimay	0–1	Kairat	Semey
19:00 (UTC+5)	Murillo (yellow card) 56'; Palacio (yellow card) 69'; Konovalov (yellow card) 83'; Zhaksylykov (yellow card) 90'	Report	Tapalov (yellow card) 27'; Gual 32'; Mata 35' (yellow card) 88'; Oksanen (yellow card) 67'; Shirobokov (red card) 69'; Jukkola (yellow card) 81'; Martynovich (yellow card) 90+5'	Stadium: Spartak Stadium; Attendance: 8,500; Referee: Alexander Zatula

5 September 2026 6	Caspiy	0–3	Kairat	Aktau
17:00 (UTC+5)	Kurbanov (yellow card) 83'	Report	Baybek 4'; Tapalov (yellow card) 21'; Edmilson 44'; Mrynsky 61'	Stadium: Zhastar Stadium; Attendance: 3,500; Referee: Aydin Tasybaev

9 September 2026 21	Kairat	3–0	Zhenis	Almaty
19:00 (UTC+5)	Edmilson 20'; Kurgin (yellow card) 52'; Gual 63'; Martynovich (yellow card) 75'; Mata 86'	Report	Šaravanja (yellow card) 45'; Adílio (yellow card) 48'	Stadium: Central Stadium; Attendance: 9,328; Referee: Bagdat Abdullaev
Note: Match originally scheduled of 8 August 2026.

13 September 2026 26	Kairat	1–4	Tobol	Almaty
19:00 (UTC+5)	Gual 40' (yellow card) 64'	Report	Milovanović 18', 44'; Myakish (yellow card) 28'; Lisakovich 63'; Guerra 80'	Stadium: Central Stadium; Attendance: 14,379; Referee: Sayat Karabaev

17 September 2026 27	Astana	1–0	Kairat	Astana
19:00 (UTC+5)	Karimov 14'; Bašić (yellow card) 86'	Report	Sadybekov (red card) 11'; Jukkola (yellow card) 60'; Gual (yellow card) 86'	Stadium: Astana Arena; Attendance: 28,235; Referee: Denis Tevyashov

10 October 2026 28	Kairat	1–0	Zhetysu	Almaty
17:00 (UTC+5)	Jukkola (yellow card) 76'; Gual 87'	Report	Baltabekov (yellow card) 31'; Kashken (yellow card) 77' (yellow-red card) 90'	Stadium: Central Stadium; Attendance: 9,219; Referee: Danil Gorda

18 October 2026 23	Kairat	5–0	Irtysh Pavlodar	Almaty
18:00 (UTC+5)	Gual 15', 34', 74'; Edmilson 16'; Tuyakbaev (yellow card) 54' (yellow card) 83'	Report	Karimov (yellow card) 26'; Mukhametzhanov (yellow card) 49'; Toleuov (yellow card) 82'	Stadium: Central Stadium; Attendance: 7,845; Referee: Sergey Nozhenko

25 October 2026 29	Aktobe	2–2	Kairat	Aktobe
18:00 (UTC+5)	Ojo 5'; Miangué (yellow card) 32'; Pibe 38'; Álvarez (yellow card) 53'	Report	Jukkola (yellow card) 11'; Martynovich (yellow card) 26'; Tuyakbaev 34' (yellow card) 48'; Gual 70'; Bekbolat (yellow card) 90+2'	Stadium: Central Stadium; Attendance: 12,400; Referee: Bulat Sariev

31 October 2026 30	Kairat	1–1	Altai	Almaty
15:00 (UTC+5)	Kasabulat (yellow card) 24'; Oksanen 55'	Report	Kenzhegulov (yellow card) 68'; Mićević (yellow card) 75'; Gorshunov 82'; Popov (yellow card) 90+3'	Stadium: Central Stadium; Attendance: 6,200; Referee: Anton Kuchma

==== League table ====
Pos	Team	Pld	W	D	L	GF	GA	GD	Pts	Qualification or relegation
1	Ordabasy (C, Q)	30	21	5	4	59	23	+36	68	Qualification for the Champions League first qualifying round
2	Kairat (T)	30	19	8	3	60	23	+37	65	Qualification for the Conference League first qualifying round
3	Astana (Q)	30	15	9	6	48	31	+17	54	Qualification for the Conference League first qualifying round
4	Okzhetpes	30	16	6	8	49	38	+11	54	
5	Aktobe	30	14	7	9	47	39	+8	49	

Source: UEFA, Soccerway
Rules for classification: 1) Points; 2) Goal difference; 3) Matches won; 4) Goals scored; 5) Away goals scored; 6) Head-to-head points; 7) Head-to-head matches won; 8) Head-to-head goal difference; 9) Head-to-head goals scored; 10) Head-to-head away goals scored; 11) Draw..
(C) Champions; (Q) Qualified for the phase indicated; (T) Qualified, but not yet for the particular phase indicated

=== Kazakhstan Cup ===
8 April 2026 Round of 32	Jaiyq	1–3	Kairat	Oral
15:00 (UTC+5)	Mukhametzhanov 26' (yellow card) 39'; Abdrakhmanov (yellow card) 33'; Umbetov (yellow card) 77'	Report	Tuyakbayev 36', 51'; Petrik 73'	Stadium: Petr Atoyan Stadium; Attendance: 8,800; Referee: Eldos Kanaev

29 April 2026 Round of 16	Kaisar	2–1	Kairat	Kyzylorda
20:00 (UTC+5)	Kaldybekov 4'; Tolegenov (yellow card) 52'; Tazhibay 61'; Askarov (yellow card) 90+5'	Report	Duysenbek (yellow card) 28'; Bazarbaev (yellow card) 60'; Bagdat (yellow card) 68'; Kurgin (yellow card) 86'; Bekbolat (yellow card) 90+2'; Tuyakbaev 90+3'	Stadium: Gani Muratbayev Stadium; Attendance: 11,000; Referee: Georgy Chekhovsky

=== 2026–27 UEFA Champions League ===
==== Qualifying rounds ====
8 July 2026 First qualifying round 1st leg	Kairat (Kazakhstan)	2–1	(Montenegro) Sutjeska Nikšić	Almaty, Kazakhstan
20:00 (UTC+5)	Kasabulat (yellow card) 43'; Áfrico 76'; Gual 90+3'	Report	Čađenović (yellow card) 35'; Golubović (yellow card) 41'; Boljević (yellow card) 75'; Mrvaljević 90'	Stadium: Central Stadium; Attendance: 14,356; Referee: Dmytro Panchyshyn (Ukraine)

16 July 2026 First qualifying round 2nd leg	Sutjeska Nikšić (Montenegro)	0–2 (1–4 agg.)	(Kazakhstan) Kairat	Nikšić, Montenegro
00:00 (UTC+5)	Šimun (yellow card) 25'; Golubović (yellow card) 29'; Ražnatović (yellow card) 65' (yellow-red card) 80'; Hočko (yellow card) 88'	Report	Bekbolat 68'; Jorginho 82' (pen.); Oksanen (yellow card) 89'	Stadium: Gradski stadion Attendance: 2,246; Referee: Wojciech Myć (Poland)

22 July 2026 Second qualifying round 1st leg	Omonia (Cyprus)	1–0	(Kazakhstan) Kairat	Nicosia, Cyprus
22:00 (UTC+5)	Andreou 13'; Négo (red card) 34'; Kakoullis (yellow card) 56'	Report	Edmilson (yellow card) 56'; Jorginho (yellow card) 56'; Martynovich (yellow card) 90+7'	Stadium: GSP Stadium; Attendance: 14,106; Referee: Gustavo Correia (Portugal)

29 July 2026 Second qualifying round 2nd leg	Kairat (Kazakhstan)	1–0 (a.e.t.) (1–1 agg.) (6–5 p)	(Cyprus) Omonia	Almaty, Kazakhstan
21:00 (UTC+5)	Jukkola (yellow card) 24'; Edilson 37'; Mrynsky (yellow card) 41'; Mendonça (yellow card) 67'	Report	Kakoullis (red card) 26'; Coulibaly (yellow card) 68' (yellow-red card) 111'; Marić (yellow card) 96'	Stadium: Central Stadium; Attendance: 19,135; Referee: Rohit Saggi (Norway)
	Penalties
	Edmilson (penalty scored); Oksanen (penalty scored); Martynovich (penalty scored); Baybek (penalty missed); Gual (penalty scored); Tuyakbaev (penalty scored); Birkurmanov (penalty scored)		(penalty scored) Chatzigiovanis; (penalty missed) Balkovev; (penalty scored) Andreou; (penalty scored) Neofytou; (penalty scored) Kousoulos; (penalty scored) Christou; (penalty missed) Panagiotou

4 August 2026 Third qualifying round 1st leg	Levski Sofia (Bulgaria)	1–0	(Kazakhstan) Kairat	Sofia, Bulgaria
22:30 (UTC+5)	Serginho 90+2' (yellow card) 90+3'	Report		Stadium: Stadion Georgi Asparuhov; Attendance: 16,916; Referee: Donatas Rumšas (Lithuania)

11 August 2026 Third qualifying round 2nd leg	Kairat (Kazakhstan)	0–1 (0–2 agg.)	(Bulgaria) Levski Sofia	Turkistan, Kazakhstan
20:00 (UTC+5)	Baybek (yellow card) 45+6'; Kasabulat (yellow card) 60'; Mendonça (yellow card) 90+4'	Report	Everton Bala (yellow card) 7'; Reinaldo 13'; Aldair (yellow card) 73'; Serafimov (yellow card) 88'; Perea (yellow card) 89'	Stadium: Turkistan Arena; Attendance: 7,000; Referee: Daniel Siebert (Germany)
Note: Kairat will play their third qualifying round home leg at the Turkistan Arena in Turkistan, instead of their regular home ground, Almaty Central Stadium in Almaty due to a scheduling conflict with a Kanye West concert.

=== UEFA Europa League ===
==== Qualifying rounds ====
20 August 2026 Play-off round 1st leg	Kairat (Kazakhstan)	0–3	(Belgium) Anderlecht	Almaty, Kazakhstan
20:00 (UTC+5)	Shirobokov (red card) 38'; Oksanen (yellow card) 64'	Report	Oksanen 2' (o.g.); Cvetković (yellow card) 21'; Ambros 24'; Sikan 45+1'; Maamar (yellow card) 49'; Biancone (yellow card) 52'; Llansana (yellow card) 73'	Stadium: Central Stadium; Attendance: 17,563; Referee: Chris Kavanagh (England)

27 August 2026 Play-off round 2nd leg	Anderlecht (Belgium)	3–0 (6–0 agg.)	(Kazakhstan) Kairat	Brussels, Belgium
23:30 (UTC+5)	Cvetković 45+2' (pen.); Sikan (yellow card) 50' (goal) 54'; Biancone 71'; Kalonji (yellow card) 87'	Report	Kasabulat (yellow card) 18'; Oksanen (yellow card) 21'; Jukkola (yellow card) 35'; Kurgin (yellow card) 86'	Stadium: Constant Vanden Stock Stadium; Attendance: 16,861; Referee: Espen Eskås (Norway)

=== UEFA Conference League ===
==== League phase ====
Pos	Team	Pld	W	D	L	GF	GA	GD	Pts
28	(Georgia (country)) Iberia 1999	2	0	1	1	1	3	−2	1
30	(Spain) Getafe	2	0	1	1	3	6	−3	1
31	(Kazakhstan) Kairat	2	0	1	1	2	6	−4	1
32	(Switzerland) Thun	2	0	0	2	0	2	−2	0
33	(Gibraltar) Lincoln Red Imps	2	0	0	2	2	6	−4	0

Updated to match(es) played on 22 October 2026. Source: UEFA
Rules for classification: League phase tiebreakers

15 October 2026 1	Riga (Latvia)	1–1	(Kazakhstan) Kairat	Riga, Latvia
21:45 (UTC+5)	Oulad M'Hand 12'; Badamosi (penalty missed) 28'	Report	Gual 5' (pen.); Oksanen (yellow card) 23'; Tapalov (yellow card) 56'; Martynovich (yellow card) 90+2'	Stadium: Skonto Stadium; Attendance: 5,440; Referee: Florian Lata (Albania)

22 October 2026 2	Kairat (Kazakhstan)	1–5	(Greece) Panathinaikos	Almaty, Kazakhstan
19:30 (UTC+5)	Tapalov (yellow card) 25'; Mrynskiy (yellow card) 45+2'; Bekbolat 79'	Report	Taborda 6'; Dessers 24' (pen.), 47'; Palmer-Brown (yellow card) 45+1'; Kangwa 57'; Rastoder 74'; Kangwa (yellow card) 77'	Stadium: Central Stadium; Attendance: 9,437; Referee: Allard Lindhout (Netherlands)

5 November 2026 3	Atalanta (Italy)	v	(Kazakhstan) Kairat	Bergamo, Italy
22:45 (UTC+5)				Stadium: Stadio di Bergamo

26 November 2026 4	Kairat (Kazakhstan)	v	(Sweden) Mjällby AIF	Almaty, Kazakhstan
20:30 (UTC+5)				Stadium: Central Stadium

10 December 2026 5	Kairat (Kazakhstan)	v	(Romania) Universitatea Craiova	Almaty, Kazakhstan
20:30 (UTC+5)				Stadium: Central Stadium

18 December 2026 6	Twente (Netherlands)	v	(Kazakhstan) Kairat	Enschede, Netherlands
01:00 (UTC+5)				Stadium: De Grolsch Veste

== Squad statistics ==
As of match played 31 October 2026

=== Appearances and goals ===
No.	Pos	Nat	Player	Total		Premier League		Kazakhstan Cup		Super Cup		2025–26 UEFA Champions League		2026–27 UEFA Champions League		2026–27 UEFA Europa League	
No.	Pos	Nat	Player	Apps	Goals	Apps	Goals	Apps	Goals	Apps	Goals	Apps	Goals	Apps	Goals	Apps	Goals
1	GK	(Kazakhstan) KAZ	Temirlan Anarbekov	37	0	27	0	0	0	1	0	2	0	6	0	1	0
3	DF	(Portugal) POR	Luís Mata	40	3	29	3	0	0	1	0	2	0	6	0	2	0
4	DF	(Kazakhstan) KAZ	Damir Kasabulat	19	0	4+7	0	0	0	0+1	0	1+1	0	3+1	0	1	0
5	DF	(Kazakhstan) KAZ	Lev Kurgin	21	0	6+8	0	1	0	0	0	0+1	0	1+2	0	1+1	0
6	MF	(Kazakhstan) KAZ	Adilet Sadybekov	20	1	6+8	0	0	0	0	0	1+1	1	2	0	1+1	0
7	FW	(Portugal) POR	Jorginho	25	10	19	8	0	0	1	0	2	1	3	1	0	0
8	MF	(Kazakhstan) KAZ	Olzhas Baybek	26	1	9+9	1	1	0	0+1	0	0	0	2+2	0	1+1	0
9	FW	(Brazil) BRA	Edmilson	38	11	19+8	10	0	0	1	0	2	0	1+5	1	1+1	0
13	MF	(Finland) FIN	Jaakko Oksanen	37	4	27+1	3	0	0	1	1	0	0	6	0	2	0
14	DF	(Belarus) BLR	Aleksandr Martynovich	34	2	25	2	0	0	1	0	2	0	5	0	0+1	0
15	FW	(Kazakhstan) KAZ	Mansur Birkurmanov	11	0	0+6	0	0	0	0+1	0	0+1	0	0+3	0	0	0
17	FW	(Kazakhstan) KAZ	Azamat Tuyakbaev	28	7	5+15	4	2	3	0	0	0	0	0+4	0	0+2	0
19	MF	(Finland) FIN	Oiva Jukkola	38	6	27+2	6	0	0	1	0	0	0	6	0	2	0
20	DF	(Kazakhstan) KAZ	Yerkin Tapalov	31	0	15+7	0	0	0	1	0	2	0	2+2	0	2	0
21	DF	(Kazakhstan) KAZ	Amirbek Bazarbaev	2	0	0	0	2	0	0	0	0	0	0	0	0	0
22	MF	(Portugal) POR	Gustavo Mendonça	17	0	9+3	0	0	0	0	0	0	0	2+1	0	1+1	0
23	FW	(Kazakhstan) KAZ	Ramazan Bagdat	8	0	0+5	0	2	0	0	0	0+1	0	0	0	0	0
24	MF	(Kazakhstan) KAZ	Alexander Mrynskiy	38	2	26+1	1	0	0	1	1	2	0	6	0	1+1	0
25	DF	(Kazakhstan) KAZ	Aleksandr Shirobokov	28	0	15+5	0	0	0	1	0	1	0	2+3	0	1	0
27	MF	(Kazakhstan) KAZ	Mukhamedali Abish	5	0	0+2	0	2	0	0	0	0+1	0	0	0	0	0
28	FW	(Spain) ESP	Marc Gual	25	13	15+2	12	0	0	0	0	0	0	6	1	2	0
30	GK	(Kazakhstan) KAZ	Danila Book	1	0	0	0	1	0	0	0	0	0	0	0	0	0
32	DF	(Kazakhstan) KAZ	Adlan Nurgaliev	4	0	0+2	0	2	0	0	0	0	0	0	0	0	0
35	DF	(Kazakhstan) KAZ	Sanat Nurbolat	1	0	0	0	0+1	0	0	0	0	0	0	0	0	0
37	MF	(Kazakhstan) KAZ	Evgeniy Petrik	2	1	0	0	0+2	1	0	0	0	0	0	0	0	0
44	DF	(Brazil) BRA	Lucas Áfrico	25	2	14+4	1	0	0	0	0	0	0	6	1	1	0
57	MF	(Kazakhstan) KAZ	Shyngys Duysenbek	2	0	0	0	2	0	0	0	0	0	0	0	0	0
59	DF	(Kazakhstan) KAZ	Daniyar Tashpulatov	2	0	0	0	1+1	0	0	0	0	0	0	0	0	0
71	MF	(Kazakhstan) KAZ	Karim Makhametzhan	1	0	0	0	0+1	0	0	0	0	0	0	0	0	0
73	DF	(Kazakhstan) KAZ	Akezhan Kalikulov	1	0	0	0	1	0	0	0	0	0	0	0	0	0
75	DF	(Kazakhstan) KAZ	Raimbek Kenesbekov	1	0	0	0	1	0	0	0	0	0	0	0	0	0
76	FW	(Kazakhstan) KAZ	Ermukhammad Kerimkhan	1	0	0	0	0+1	0	0	0	0	0	0	0	0	0
78	MF	(Kazakhstan) KAZ	Alamgir Smakov	2	0	0	0	0+2	0	0	0	0	0	0	0	0	0
81	FW	(Kazakhstan) KAZ	Ismail Bekbolat	25	2	3+12	1	1+1	0	0	0	0	0	1+5	1	1+1	0
82	GK	(Kazakhstan) KAZ	Sherkhan Kalmurza	5	0	3	0	1	0	0	0	0	0	0	0	1	0
98	GK	(Kazakhstan) KAZ	Bakhtiyar Aldashev	1	0	0	0	0+1	0	0	0	0	0	0	0	0	0
Players away from Kairat on loan:
Players who left Kairat during the season:
10	FW	(Kazakhstan) KAZ	Dastan Satpayev	16	7	13+2	7	0	0	0+1	0	0	0	0	0	0	0
11	MF	(Argentina) ARG	Sebastián Zeballos	11	0	3+7	0	1	0	0	0	0	0	0	0	0	0
18	MF	(Israel) ISR	Dan Glazer	14	0	10+1	0	0	0	1	0	2	0	0	0	0	0
33	MF	(Serbia) SRB	Jug Stanojev	1	0	0	0	0	0	0	0	0+1	0	0	0	0	0
55	MF	(Belarus) BLR	Valery Gromyko	2	0	0	0	0	0	0	0	1+1	0	0	0	0	0
80	DF	(Russia) RUS	Yegor Sorokin	2	0	0	0	0	0	0	0	2	0	0	0	0	0
99	FW	(Brazil) BRA	Ricardinho	10	1	1+5	0	1	0	0+1	0	0+2	1	0	0	0	0

=== Goal scorers ===
Place	Position	Nation	Number	Name	Premier League	Kazakhstan Cup	Super Cup	2025–26 UEFA Champions League	2026–27 UEFA Champions League	2026–27 UEFA Europa League	2026–27 UEFA Conference League	Total
1	FW	(Spain)	28	Marc Gual	12	0	0	0	1	0	1	14
2	FW	(Brazil)	9	Edmilson	10	0	0	0	1	0	0	11
3	FW	(Portugal)	7	Jorginho	8	0	0	1	1	0	0	10
4	FW	(Kazakhstan)	10	Dastan Satpayev	7	0	0	0	0	0	0	7
4	FW	(Kazakhstan)	17	Azamat Tuyakbaev	4	3	0	0	0	0	0	7
6	MF	(Finland)	19	Oiva Jukkola	6	0	0	0	0	0	0	6
7	MF	(Finland)	13	Jaakko Oksanen	3	0	1	0	0	0	0	4
8	DF	(Portugal)	3	Luís Mata	3	0	0	0	0	0	0	3
8	FW	(Kazakhstan)	81	Ismail Bekbolat	1	0	0	0	1	0	1	3
10	DF	(Belarus)	14	Aleksandr Martynovich	2	0	0	0	0	0	0	2
10	DF	(Kazakhstan)	24	Aleksandr Mrynskiy	1	0	1	0	0	0	0	2
10	DF	(Brazil)	44	Lucas Áfrico	1	0	0	0	1	0	0	2
13	MF	(Kazakhstan)	8	Olzhas Baybek	1	0	0	0	0	0	0	1
13	MF	(Kazakhstan)	37	Evgeniy Petrik	0	1	0	0	0	0	0	1
13	MF	(Kazakhstan)	6	Adilet Sadybekov	0	0	0	1	0	0	0	1
13	FW	(Brazil)	99	Ricardinho	0	0	0	1	0	0	0	1
13				Own goal	1	0	0	0	0	0	0	1
				TOTALS	60	4	2	3	5	0	1	75

=== Clean sheets ===
Place	Position	Nation	Number	Name	Premier League	Kazakhstan Cup	Super Cup	2025–26 UEFA Champions League	2026–27 UEFA Champions League	2026–27 UEFA Europa League	2026–27 UEFA Conference League	Total
1	GK	(Kazakhstan)	1	Temirlan Anarbekov	13	0	0	0	2	0	0	15
				TOTALS	13	0	0	0	2	0	0	15

=== Disciplinary record ===
Number	Nation	Position	Name	Premier League		Kazakhstan Cup		Super Cup		2025–26 UEFA Champions League		2026–27 UEFA Champions League		2026–27 UEFA Europa League		2026–27 UEFA Conference League		Total	
Number	Nation	Position	Name	Yellow card	Red card	Yellow card	Red card	Yellow card	Red card	Yellow card	Red card	Yellow card	Red card	Yellow card	Red card	Yellow card	Red card	Yellow card	Red card
1	(Kazakhstan)	GK	Temirlan Anarbekov	2	0	0	0	0	0	0	0	0	0	0	0	0	0	2	0
3	(Portugal)	DF	Luís Mata	4	1	0	0	0	0	0	0	0	0	0	0	0	0	4	1
4	(Kazakhstan)	DF	Damir Kasabulat	3	0	0	0	0	0	0	0	2	0	1	0	0	0	6	0
5	(Kazakhstan)	DF	Lev Kurgin	1	0	1	0	0	0	0	0	0	0	1	0	0	0	3	0
6	(Kazakhstan)	MF	Adilet Sadybekov	0	2	0	0	0	0	1	0	0	0	0	0	0	0	1	2
7	(Portugal)	FW	Jorginho	5	0	0	0	0	0	1	0	1	0	0	0	0	0	7	0
8	(Kazakhstan)	MF	Olzhas Baybek	1	0	0	0	0	0	0	0	1	0	0	0	0	0	2	0
9	(Brazil)	FW	Edmilson	3	0	0	0	1	0	0	0	1	0	0	0	0	0	5	0
13	(Finland)	MF	Jaakko Oksanen	6	1	0	0	0	0	0	0	1	0	2	0	1	0	10	1
14	(Belarus)	DF	Aleksandr Martynovich	7	0	0	0	0	0	0	0	1	0	0	0	1	0	9	0
17	(Kazakhstan)	FW	Azamat Tuyakbaev	2	0	0	0	0	0	0	0	0	0	0	0	0	0	2	0
19	(Finland)	MF	Oiva Jukkola	8	0	0	0	0	0	0	0	1	0	1	0	0	0	10	0
20	(Kazakhstan)	DF	Yerkin Tapalov	3	0	0	0	1	0	0	0	0	0	0	0	2	0	6	0
21	(Kazakhstan)	DF	Amirbek Bazarbaev	0	0	1	0	0	0	0	0	0	0	0	0	0	0	1	0
22	(Portugal)	MF	Gustavo Mendonça	0	0	0	0	0	0	0	0	2	0	0	0	0	0	2	0
23	(Kazakhstan)	FW	Ramazan Bagdat	1	0	1	0	0	0	0	0	0	0	0	0	0	0	2	0
24	(Kazakhstan)	MF	Alexander Mrynskiy	1	0	0	0	0	0	0	0	1	0	0	0	1	0	3	0
25	(Kazakhstan)	DF	Aleksandr Shirobokov	0	1	0	0	0	0	0	0	0	0	0	1	0	0	0	2
28	(Spain)	FW	Marc Gual	3	0	0	0	0	0	0	0	0	0	0	0	0	0	3	0
32	(Kazakhstan)	DF	Adlan Nurgaliev	2	0	0	0	0	0	0	0	0	0	0	0	0	0	2	0
44	(Brazil)	DF	Lucas Áfrico	4	0	0	0	0	0	0	0	0	0	0	0	0	0	4	0
57	(Kazakhstan)	MF	Shyngys Duysenbek	0	0	1	0	0	0	0	0	0	0	0	0	0	0	1	0
81	(Kazakhstan)	DF	Ismail Bekbolat	1	0	1	0	0	0	0	0	0	0	0	0	0	0	2	0
Players away on loan:
Players who left Kairat during the season:
18	(Israel)	MF	Dan Glazer	3	0	0	0	0	0	0	0	0	0	0	0	0	0	3	0
80	(Russia)	DF	Yegor Sorokin	0	0	0	0	0	0	1	0	0	0	0	0	0	0	1	0
			TOTALS	60	5	5	0	2	0	3	0	11	0	5	1	5	0	91	6
