= 2026 Kazakhstan Super Cup =

Kairat	Tobol
2	2
- Tobol won 5–4 on penalties
- Date: 28 February 2026
- Venue: Astana Arena, Astana
- Referee: Denis Tevyashov
- Attendance: 15,546

The 2026 Kazakhstan Super Cup is the 19th Kazakhstan Super Cup, an annual football match played between the winners of the previous season's Premier League, Kairat, and the winners of the previous season's Kazakhstan Cup, Tobol. The match will be played on 28 February 2025, at the Astana Arena in Astana.

== Match details ==
28 February 2026
18:00 (UTC+5)

Kairat	2 – 2	Tobol
Mrynskiy 20'; Jorginho (penalty missed) 25'; Oksanen 26'	Report	Guerra 6'; Tagybergen 89'
Penalties
Ricardinho (penalty missed); Oksanen (penalty scored); Kasabulat (penalty scored); Baybek (penalty scored); Satpayev (penalty scored)	4 – 5	(penalty scored) Zhumashev; (penalty scored) Asrankulov; (penalty scored) Tagybergen; (penalty scored) Ndiaye; (penalty scored) Zhumat

Astana Arena, Astana
Attendance: 15,546
Referee: Denis Tevyashov

Kairat	Tobol

GK	1	(Kazakhstan) Temirlan Anarbekov
DF	3	(Portugal) Luís Mata
DF	14	(Belarus) Aleksandr Martynovich		(substituted off) 16'
DF	20	(Kazakhstan) Yerkin Tapalov	(yellow card) 13'	(substituted off) 83'
DF	24	(Kazakhstan) Alexander Mrynskiy
DF	25	(Kazakhstan) Aleksandr Shirobokov
MF	13	(Finland) Jaakko Oksanen
MF	18	(Israel) Dan Glazer
MF	19	(Finland) Oiva Jukkola		(substituted off) 72'
FW	7	(Portugal) Jorginho		(substituted off) 83'
FW	9	(Brazil) Edmilson	(yellow card) 73'	(substituted off) 71'
Substitutes:
GK	82	(Kazakhstan) Sherkhan Kalmurza
DF	4	(Kazakhstan) Damir Kasabulat		(substituted on) 16'
DF	5	(Kazakhstan) Lev Kurgin
MF	6	(Kazakhstan) Adilet Sadybekov
MF	8	(Kazakhstan) Olzhas Baybek		(substituted on) 83'
FW	10	(Kazakhstan) Dastan Satpayev		(substituted on) 71'
FW	15	(Kazakhstan) Mansur Birkurmanov		(substituted on) 83'
FW	17	(Kazakhstan) Azamat Tuyakbaev
FW	23	(Kazakhstan) Ramazan Bagdat
MF	27	(Kazakhstan) Mukhamedali Abish
FW	99	(Brazil) Ricardinho		(substituted on) 72'
Manager:
(Kazakhstan) Rafael Urazbakhtin

GK	1	(Kazakhstan) Sultan Busurmanov
DF	4	(Montenegro) Nemanja Cavnić	(yellow card) 24'
DF	5	(France) Pape-Alioune Ndiaye
DF	15	(Montenegro) Marko Vukčević		(substituted off) 41'
DF	22	(Kazakhstan) Aleksandr Marochkin
MF	6	(Belarus) Maksim Myakish
MF	8	(Kazakhstan) Askhat Tagybergen	(yellow card) 68'
MF	17	(Kazakhstan) Aleksandr Zuyev		(substituted off) 61'
MF	21	(Kazakhstan) Nauryzbek Zhagorov		(substituted off) 78'
FW	30	(Venezuela) Luis Guerra		(substituted off) 61'
FW	99	(Albania) Rubin Hebaj		(substituted off) 78'
Substitutes:
GK	35	(Kazakhstan) Yuri Melikhov
GK	44	(Kazakhstan) Danil Ustimenko
DF	3	(Kazakhstan) Roman Asrankulov		(substituted on) 41'
MF	7	(Kazakhstan) Zhaslan Zhumashev		(substituted on) 61'
FW	11	(Kazakhstan) Damir Marat	(yellow card) 62'	(substituted on) 61'
MF	13	(Guinea) Abdoulaye Cissé
FW	18	(Serbia) Uroš Milovanović		(substituted on) 78'
MF	19	(Kazakhstan) Dauren Zhumat	(yellow card) 82'	(substituted on) 78'
DF	26	(Russia) Kirill Glushchenkov
MF	29	(Kazakhstan) Daniyar Usenov
MF	34	(Kazakhstan) Sultan Bakhytkiriev
MF	88	(Kazakhstan) Meyrambek Kalmyrza
Manager:
(Kazakhstan) Nurbol Zhumaskaliyev

Assistant referees:
Sergey Kalachev
Denis Labashov
Fourth official:
Danil Gorda
Video assistant referee:
Aidyn Tasybayev
Assistant video assistant referee:
Saken Bayymbet

== See also ==
- 2025 Kazakhstan Premier League
- 2025 Kazakhstan Cup
