= Danila Buch =

Kazakh footballer (born 2008)

Personal information
- Full name: Danila Romanovich Buch
- Date of birth: 12 February 2008 (age 18)
- Place of birth: Almaty, Kazakhstan
- Height: 1.80 m (5 ft 11 in)
- Position: Goalkeeper

Team information
- Current team: Kairat
- Number: 30

Youth career
- 2024–: Kairat

Senior career*
Years	Team	Apps	(Gls)
2025–	Kairat-Zhastar	7	(0)
2026–	Kairat	0	(0)

International career
2024–2025	Kazakhstan U17	4	(0)
- * Club domestic league appearances and goals as of 23:59, 16 June 2026 (UTC)

Danila Romanovich Buch (BOO-ch; Russian: Данила Романович Буч; born 20 April 2008) is a Kazakh professional footballer who plays as a goalkeeper for Kazakhstan Premier League club Kairat and its Kazakhstan First League feeder team Kairat-Zhastar.

== Club career ==
Buch joined the youth academy of Kairat in 2024. He joined the feeder team Kairat-Zhastar on 12 September 2025, and he debuted for Kairat-Zhastar on 19 September 2025 during the 3–0 loss against Akademiya Ontustik.

He joined Kairat on 1 January 2026, and he made his debut for Kairat on 8 April 2026 during the 3–1 victory against Jaiyq in the Kazakhstan Cup round of 32.

== International career ==
Buch made four appearances for Kazakhstan U17 between 2024 and 2025.

== Career statistics ==
=== Club ===
As of match played 16 June 2026

Appearances and goals by club, season and competition
Club	Season	League			Kazakhstan Cup		Kazakhstan League Cup		Continental		Other		Total	
Club	Season	Division	Apps	Goals	Apps	Goals	Apps	Goals	Apps	Goals	Apps	Goals	Apps	Goals
Kairat-Zhastar	2025	Kazakhstan First League	2	0	0	0	—		—		—		2	0
Kairat-Zhastar	2026	Kazakhstan First League	5	0	0	0	—		—		—		5	0
Kairat	2026	Kazakhstan Premier League	0	0	1	0	0	0	0	0	0	0	1	0
Kairat	Total		7	0	1	0	0	0	0	0	—		8	0
Career total			7	0	1	0	0	0	0	0	—		8	0

== Honours ==
Kairat

- Kazakhstan Super Cup: runner-up 2026
