= Sherkhan Kalmurza =

Kazakh footballer (born 2007)

Personal information
- Full name: Sherkhan Eldaruly Kalmurza
- Date of birth: 15 June 2007 (age 19)
- Place of birth: Zhualy District, Kazakhstan
- Height: 1.87 m (6 ft 2 in)
- Position: Goalkeeper

Team information
- Current team: Kairat
- Number: 82

Youth career
- –2026: Kairat

Senior career*
Years	Team	Apps	(Gls)
2024–	Kairat-Zhastar	17	(0)
2025–	Kairat	6	(0)

International career^{‡}
2023	Kazakhstan U17	3	(0)
2025–2026	Kazakhstan U19	5	(0)
2026–	Kazakhstan U21	2	(0)
- * Club domestic league appearances and goals as of 1 November 2026 ‡ National team caps and goals as of 8 June 2026

Sherkhan Eldaruly Kalmurza (Kazakh: Шерхан Елдарұлы Қалмұрза, romanized: Şerhan Eldarūly Qalmūrza; born 15 June 2007) is a Kazakh professional footballer who plays as a goalkeeper for Kazakhstan Premier League club Kairat and its Kazakhstan First League feeder team Kairat-Zhastar.

== Club career ==
Sherkhan Kalmurza played for the youth team at Kairat and he is a two-time Kazakh Youth League champion. He made two appearances during the 2024–25 UEFA Youth League before he was promoted to the club's feeder team Kairat-Zhastar towards the end of the 2024 season at the age of 17. He made his debut for the club during the 4–1 win against Khan Tengri on 17 April 2025.

Kalmurza was first included in the senior Kairat squad after first-choice goalkeeper Aleksandr Zarutskiy was injured against Celtic on 20 August 2025. He made his debut for Kairat on 14 September 2025 as a first-half substitute after second-choice goalkeeper Temirlan Anarbekov was injured during the 1–0 victory against Aktobe. He then made his first start for Kairat during the 4–1 loss against Sporting CP during the UEFA Champions League on 18 September 2025; during the match, Kalmurza saved a first-half penalty kick from Morten Hjulmand, becoming the youngest keeper to save a penalty in a Champions League debut.

Kalmurza returned to playing for Kairat-Zhastar on 24 October 2025 during the 5–1 victory against SD Family Astana.

== International career ==
He represented Kazakhstan U17 during the 2023 UEFA European Under-17 Championship qualifying competition, and he has also represented the Kazakhstan U19 team during 2026 UEFA European Under-19 Championship qualification.

== Career statistics ==
=== Club ===
As of match played 17 September 2026

Appearances and goals by club, season and competition
Club	Season	League			Kazakhstan Cup		Kazakhstan League Cup		Continental		Other		Total	
Club	Season	Division	Apps	Goals	Apps	Goals	Apps	Goals	Apps	Goals	Apps	Goals	Apps	Goals
Kairat-Zhastar	2024	Kazakhstan First League	0	0	—		—		—		—		0	0
Kairat-Zhastar	2025	Kazakhstan First League	8	0	—		—		—		—		8	0
Kairat-Zhastar	2026	Kazakhstan First League	9	0	—		—		—		—		9	0
Kairat-Zhastar	Total		17	0	—		—		—		—		17	0
Kairat	2025	Kazakhstan Premier League	3	0	0	0	0	0	2 (Note: Appearances in UEFA Champions League)	0	—		5	0
Kairat	2026	Kazakhstan Premier League	2	0	1	0	0	0	1 (Note: One appearance in UEFA Europa League)	0	—		4	0
Kairat	Total		5	0	1	0	0	0	3	0	—		9	0
Career total			22	0	1	0	0	0	3	0	0	0	26	0

== Honours ==
Kairat U18

- Kazakh Youth League/QJ League (2): 2022, 2023

Kairat

- Kazakhstan Premier League (1): 2025
- Kazakhstan Super Cup: runner-up 2026
