= Anatoliy Povedenok =

Kazakhstani footballer

Personal information
- Full name: Anatoliy Povedenok
- Date of birth: 11 June 1969 (age 57)
- Place of birth: Soviet Union
- Height: 1.83 m (6 ft 0 in)
- Position: Defender

Youth career
- Bolat

Senior career*
Years	Team	Apps	(Gls)
1987	Shakhter Karagandy	16	(1)
1988	Kuban Barannikovsky		
1989	Bolat		
1990–1992	Shakhter Karagandy	90	(4)
1992–1994	Zorya Luhansk	26	(1)
1994	Aktyubinets	16	(0)
1994	Bolat	13	(1)
1995	Yelimay Semey	22	(0)
1996	Irtysh Pavlodar	24	(1)

International career
1992	Kazakhstan	3	(0)
- * Club domestic league appearances and goals

Anatoliy Povedenok (born 11 June 1969) is a retired Kazakh football defender.

Povedenok spent most of his career playing for FC Shakhter Karagandy, and played for the FC Yelimay Semey side that won the 1995 Kazakhstan Premier League. He also played for FC Zorya Luhansk in the Ukrainian Premier League.

Povedenok made three appearances for the Kazakhstan national football team during 1992.

== See also ==
- Football in Kazakhstan
- List of football clubs in Kazakhstan
