= Dastan Satpayev =

Kazakh footballer (born 2008)

- Satpayev with Burnley in 2026

Personal information
- Full name: Dastan Talgatuly Satpayev
- Date of birth: 12 August 2008 (age 18)
- Place of birth: Almaty, Kazakhstan
- Height: 1.76 m (5 ft 9 in)
- Position: Forward

Team information
- Current team: Burnley (on loan from Chelsea)
- Number: 12

Youth career
- 2017–2023: Kairat

Senior career*
Years	Team	Apps	(Gls)
2024	Kairat-Zhastar	5	(1)
2024–2026	Kairat	41	(21)
2026–	Chelsea	0	(0)
2026–	→ Burnley (loan)	6	(0)

International career^{‡}
2023–2024	Kazakhstan U17	10	(4)
2025–	Kazakhstan U21	1	(0)
2025–	Kazakhstan	8	(1)
- * Club domestic league appearances and goals as of 15:20, 24 October 2026 (UTC) ‡ National team caps and goals as of 18:20, 9 June 2026 (UTC)

Dastan Talgatuly Satpayev (Kazakh: Дастан Талғатұлы Сатпаев; born 12 August 2008) is a Kazakh professional footballer who plays as a forward for EFL Championship club Burnley, on loan from Premier League club Chelsea, and the Kazakhstan national team.

== Club career ==
=== Kairat ===
Born in Almaty, Satpayev joined the Kairat academy at eight years old. He first came to prominence in the youth QJ League, with a total of 27 goals and 10 assists in 28 matches, during the 2023 and 2024 seasons, receiving the Most Valuable Player award during the latter, whilst also making his senior debut with the reserve team in the Kazakhstan First League and scoring in the UEFA Youth League.

Satpayev made his first team debut for Kairat aged 15 on 26 May 2024, coming on as a substitute for Élder Santana in the 80th minute of a 9–0 Kazakhstan League Cup win against Akzhayik. In February 2025, Kairat announced that Satpayev agreed a transfer to Premier League club Chelsea, set to happen in August 2026 after he turns 18, for a reported fee of €4 million.

On 2 March 2025, he scored a goal for his Kazakh league debut, a 1–1 away draw against FK Astana. He later proceeded to establish himself as a regular performer in the top league and one of his country brightest prospects, earning him comparisons to French star Kylian Mbappé in the Kazakh newspapers. On 8 July, he scored the only goal in an away 1–1 draw against Slovenian club NK Olimpia in the 2025–26 UEFA Champions League first qualifying round. At 16 years, 10 months and 27 days, he became the youngest Kazakh to play and score in a UEFA club competition match. On 18 September, Satpayev played in the 4–1 defeat against in Sporting CP in the 2025–26 Champions League league phase. At the age of 17 years, one month and six days, he became the youngest Kazakh to feature in an UEFA club competition final phase. Later that year, on 26 November, he scored his first Champions League goal in a 3–2 away defeat against Copenhagen, becoming the first Kazakh player to achieve this feat.

=== Chelsea ===
In July 2026, Kairat granted Satpayev permission to link up early with Chelsea's first-team squad ahead of the formal completion of his transfer. On 9 July, he participated in the club's opening pre-season training session at Cobham under newly appointed head coach Xabi Alonso. On 28 July 2026, Satpayev started and scored a goal in the friendly Sydney Super Cup match against Western Sydney Wanderers.

==== Loan to Burnley ====
On 14 August 2026, Satpayev's transfer to Chelsea was made official. He signed a seven-year contract with Chelsea and subsequently joined Championship club Burnley on a season-long loan.

== International career ==
Satpayev is a youth international for Kazakhstan, having played for the under-17 team since October 2023, scoring four goals in ten games and eventually serving as captain of the team.

Satpayev received his first call-up to the Kazakhstan senior team in March 2025. He debuted on 19 March in a 2–0 friendly win against Curaçao. By doing so, at the 16 years, 7 months and 10 days, he became the youngest player to ever debut for the Kazakh senior team. Satpayev then went on to play in the World Cup qualifying, replacing Maksim Samorodov on the 74th minute of a 3–1 away loss to Wales on 22 March 2025, to become at 16 years, seven months and 13 days the youngest Kazakh player to feature in a FIFA World Cup qualification game. On 15 November, he scored the opening goal in the 1–1 draw against Belgium at the World Cup qualifying, becoming Kazakhstan's youngest goalscorer at the age of 17 years, three months and three days.

== Style of play ==
A centre-forward also able to play on the flank, technically gifted with both feet, Satpayev was soon praised for his speed, agility, hard work, dribbling and finishing abilities. This earned him comparison to fast-paced scorer Kylian Mbappé, while his physical profile was compared to Argentine star Sergio Agüero.

== Career statistics ==
=== Club ===
As of match played 24 October 2026

Appearances and goals by club, season and competition
Club	Season	League			National cup (Note: Includes Kazakhstan Cup, FA Cup)		League cup (Note: Includes Kazakhstan League Cup, EFL Cup)		Continental		Other		Total	
Club	Season	Division	Apps	Goals	Apps	Goals	Apps	Goals	Apps	Goals	Apps	Goals	Apps	Goals
Kairat	2024	Kazakhstan Premier League	0	0	0	0	1	0	—		—		1	0
Kairat	2025	Kazakhstan Premier League	26	14	2	1	0	0	12 (Note: Appearances in UEFA Champions League)	4	1 (Note: Appearance in Kazakhstan Super Cup)	0	41	19
Kairat	2026	Kazakhstan Premier League	15	7	0	0	0	0	0	0	1	0	16	7
Kairat	Total		41	21	2	1	1	0	12	4	2	0	58	26
Kairat-Zhastar (loan)	2024	Kazakhstan First League	5	1	0	0	—		—		—		5	1
Chelsea	2026–27	Premier League	0	0	0	0	0	0	—		—		0	0
Burnley (loan)	2026–27	Championship	6	0	0	0	1	0	—		—		7	0
Career total			52	22	2	1	2	0	12	4	2	0	70	27

=== International ===
As of match played 9 June 2026

Appearances and goals by national team and year
National team	Year	Apps	Goals
Kazakhstan	2025	6	1
Kazakhstan	2026	2	0
Total		8	1

Scores and results list Kazakhstan's goal tally first, score column indicates score after each Satpayev goal.

List of international goals scored by Dastan Satpayev
No.	Date	Venue	Cap	Opponent	Score	Result	Competition
1	15 November 2025	Astana Arena, Astana, Kazakhstan	7	Belgium	1–0	1–1	2026 FIFA World Cup qualification

== Honours ==
Kairat

- Kazakhstan Premier League: 2025
- Kazakhstan Super Cup: 2025

Individual

- Kazakhstan Premier League Player of the Year: 2025
- Kazakhstan Premier League Under-21 Player of the Year: 2025

Honours

- Youth Award “Daryn”: 2025/2026
