= List of football clubs in Kazakhstan =

This is the list of football clubs (teams) in Kazakhstan.

== Kazakhstan Premier League ==
Team	Location
Ordabasy	Shymkent
Kairat	Almaty
Astana	Astana
Okzhetpes	Kokshetau
Aktobe	Aktobe
Yelimay	Semey
Ulytau	Jezkazgan
Zhenys	Astana
Atyrau	Atyrau
Jetisu	Taldykorgan
Kaisar	Kyzylorda
Kyzylzhar	Petropavl
Tobol	Kostanay
Caspiy	Aktau
Irtysh	Pavlodar
Altai	Oskemen

== Kazakhstan First League ==
Club	City
Aktobe-2	Aktobe
Akas	Almaty
Altai	Oskemen
Turan	Turkistan
Ekibastuz	Ekibastuz
Jetisay	Zhetisay
Kairat-Zhastar	Almaty
Khan Tengri	Almaty
Oñtüstik Akademia	Shymkent
Shakhter	Karaganda
SD Family	Astana
Taraz	Taraz
Turkestan	Shymkent

== Kazakhstan Second League ==
=== Northeast Conference ===
Club	City
SD Family М	Astana
Altai M	Ust-Kamenogorsk
Astana M	Astana
Yelimai M	Semei
Zhenis M	Astana
Zhetisu M	Zhetisu
Kyzylzhar M	Petropavlsk
Okzhetpes M	Kokshetau
Tobol M	Kostanay
Ulytau M	Zhezkazgan
Shakhter M	Karaganda

=== Southwest Conference ===
Club
Jeyran
Arys
Atyrau M
Zhayyk
Zhas Kyran
Kaisar M
Caspii M
Maktaral
Ordabasy M
Talas
Turan M

== Lower leagues ==
1. FC Ekibastuzets, Ekibastuz
2. FC Yassi, Turkestan
3. FC Astana, Astana

== Children's football club ==
1. Arlandar FC, Astana

== Defunct ==
1. FC Almaty, Almaty 2000–2008
2. FC Arman, Kentau 1992
3. FC Azhar, Kokshetau 1992–93
4. FC Dostyk, Almaty 1993
5. FC Megasport, Almaty 2005–2008
6. FC SKIF Ordabasy, Shymkent 1992–96
7. FC Ulytau, Zhezkazgan 1967–97
