= 1991 Soviet Second League, Zone East =

Second League
- Season: 1991
- Champions: Okean Nakhodka
- Promoted: cancelled
- Relegated: 4 teams (cancelled)

1991 Soviet Second League, Zone East was the last season of association football competition of the Soviet Second League in the Zone East. The competition was won by FC Okean Nakhodka.

The group (zone) consisted predominantly out of Soviet Central Asia clubs. With fall of the Soviet Union and discontinuation of Soviet competition, most clubs of the group joined their top national leagues.

== Teams ==
=== Promoted teams ===
- Nuravshon Bukhoro
- Vostok Ust-Kamenogorsk
- Kasansayets Kasansai
- Sakhalin Yuzhno-Sakhalinsk
- Zhetysu Taldy‑Kurgan

=== Relegated teams ===
- Kuzbass Kemerevo

== Final standings ==
Pos	Republic	Team	Pld	W	D	L	GF	GA	GD	Pts
1	(Russian Soviet Federative Socialist Republic) Russia	Okean Nakhodka	42	27	7	8	68	33	+35	61
2	(Turkmen Soviet Socialist Republic) Turkmenistan	Kopetdag Ashkhabat	42	25	8	9	89	36	+53	58
3	(Kirghiz Soviet Socialist Republic) Kyrgyzstan	Alga Bishkek (Note: Capital city of the Kyrgyz SSR Frunze was renamed into Bishkek.)	42	21	12	9	60	31	+29	54
4	(Uzbek Soviet Socialist Republic) Uzbekistan	Nurafshon Bukhara	42	20	9	13	72	45	+27	49
5	(Kazakh Soviet Socialist Republic) Kazakhstan	Vostok Ust-Kamenogorsk	42	19	9	14	69	62	+7	47
6	(Russian Soviet Federative Socialist Republic) Russia (1E)	Zvezda Irkutsk	42	20	5	17	62	45	+17	45
7	(Russian Soviet Federative Socialist Republic) Russia (1E)	Kuzbass Kemerevo	42	19	6	17	58	61	−3	44
8	(Kazakh Soviet Socialist Republic) Kazakhstan	Tselinnik Tselinograd	42	19	6	17	44	51	−7	44
9	(Kazakh Soviet Socialist Republic) Kazakhstan	Traktor Pavlodar	42	19	5	18	54	50	+4	43
10	(Kazakh Soviet Socialist Republic) Kazakhstan	Shakhter Karaganda	42	18	7	17	48	42	+6	43
11	(Kazakh Soviet Socialist Republic) Kazakhstan	Khimik Dzhambul	42	17	9	16	56	47	+9	43
12	(Kazakh Soviet Socialist Republic) Kazakhstan	Meliorator Chimkent	42	17	9	16	44	37	+7	43
13	(Russian Soviet Federative Socialist Republic) Russia (1E)	Amur Blagoveschensk	42	16	11	15	51	53	−2	43
14	(Uzbek Soviet Socialist Republic) Uzbekistan	Avtomobilist Kokand	42	19	4	19	67	71	−4	42
15	(Russian Soviet Federative Socialist Republic) Russia (1E)	Dynamo Barnaul	42	15	12	15	60	64	−4	42
16	(Uzbek Soviet Socialist Republic) Uzbekistan	Sogdiana Dzhizak	42	18	5	19	56	55	+1	41
17	(Uzbek Soviet Socialist Republic) Uzbekistan	Kasansayets Kasansai	42	17	6	19	69	66	+3	40
18	(Kazakh Soviet Socialist Republic) Kazakhstan	Ekibastuzets Ekibastuz	42	14	9	19	49	63	−14	37
19	(Russian Soviet Federative Socialist Republic) Russia (1E)	Sakhalin Yuzhno-Sakhalinsk	42	12	10	20	37	59	−22	34
20	(Uzbek Soviet Socialist Republic) Uzbekistan	Surkhan Termez	42	12	3	27	37	65	−28	27
21	(Kazakh Soviet Socialist Republic) Kazakhstan	Zhetysu Taldy‑Kurgan	42	9	6	27	44	96	−52	24
22	(Tajik Soviet Socialist Republic) Tajikistan	Vakhsh Kurgan‑Tyube	42	7	6	29	36	98	−62	20

=== Representation by Republic ===
- Kazakh SSR: 8
- Russian SFSR: 6
- Uzbek SSR: 5
- Kyrgyz SSR: 1
- Turkmen SSR: 1
- Tajik SSR: 1

== Top goalscorers ==
The following were the top ten goalscorers.

#	Scorer	Goals (Pen.)	Team
