= 1998 AFC Youth Championship =

Tournament details
- Host country: Thailand
- Dates: 17–31 October
- Teams: 10 (from 1 confederation)
- Venue: 1 (in 1 host city)

Final positions
- Champions: South Korea (9th title)
- Runners-up: Japan
- Third place: Saudi Arabia
- Fourth place: Kazakhstan

Tournament statistics
- Matches played: 24
- Goals scored: 76 (3.17 per match)
- Top scorer(s): (South Korea) Lee Dong-gook (Japan) Masashi Motoyama (5 goals each)
- Best player: (Japan) Shinji Ono

The 1998 AFC Youth Championship was held from 17 to 31 October 1998, in Chiang Mai, Thailand. The tournament was won for the ninth time by South Korea in the final against Japan.

== Participants ==
- Thailand (qualified as hosts)
- China
- India
- Iraq
- Japan
- Kazakhstan
- Kuwait
- Qatar
- Saudi Arabia
- South Korea

The teams that reached the semi-finals qualified for the 1999 FIFA World Youth Championship in Nigeria.

== Venues ==
Chiang Mai
700th Anniversary Stadium
Capacity: 25,000
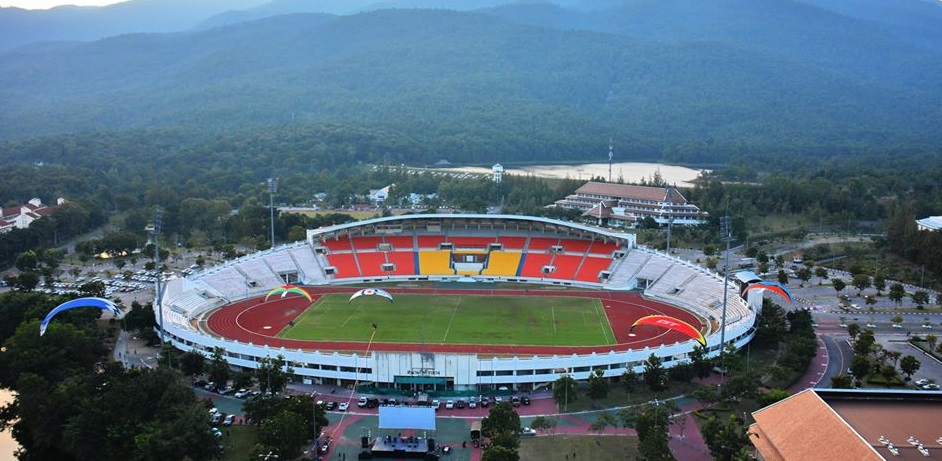

== Group stage ==
=== Group A ===
Team	Pld	W	D	L	GF	GA	GD	Pts
Saudi Arabia	4	3	1	0	5	1	+4	10
Kazakhstan	4	2	1	1	7	5	+2	7
Thailand	4	1	3	0	6	2	+4	6
Kuwait	4	0	2	2	2	5	−3	2
India	4	0	1	3	3	10	−7	1

17 October 1998
Thailand	0 – 0	Saudi Arabia
Kazakhstan	3 – 2	India
19 October 1998
Thailand	4 – 0	India
Kuwait	0 – 1	Saudi Arabia
21 October 1998
Kuwait	0 – 2	Kazakhstan
Saudi Arabia	2 – 0	India
23 October 1998
India	1 – 1	Kuwait
Thailand	1 – 1	Kazakhstan
25 October 1998
Saudi Arabia	2 – 1	Kazakhstan
Thailand	1 – 1	Kuwait

=== Group B ===
Team	Pld	W	D	L	GF	GA	GD	Pts
South Korea	4	3	1	0	8	3	+5	10
Japan	4	2	1	1	13	6	+7	7
China	4	1	1	2	7	8	−1	4
Qatar	4	1	1	2	2	6	−4	4
Iraq	4	1	0	3	6	13	−7	3

18 October 1998
South Korea	3 – 2	China
Qatar	2 – 1	Iraq
20 October 1998
Qatar	0 – 0	South Korea
Japan	2 – 2	China
22 October 1998
Japan	6 – 2	Iraq
China	1 – 0	Qatar
24 October 1998
Qatar	0 – 4	Japan
Iraq	0 – 3	South Korea
26 October 1998
China	2 – 3	Iraq
South Korea	2 – 1	Japan

== Knockout stage ==
Semi-finals
29 October
Saudi Arabia	2
Japan	4
29 October
South Korea (pen)	2 (4)
Kazakhstan	2 (3)

Final
31 October
South Korea	2
Japan	1
Third place
31 October
Saudi Arabia	3
Kazakhstan	1

=== Semifinal ===
October 29, 1998

Saudi Arabia	2 – 4	Japan

700th Anniversary Stadium, Chiang Mai

October 29, 1998

South Korea	2 – 2 (4 PK 3)	Kazakhstan

700th Anniversary Stadium, Chiang Mai

=== Third-place match ===
October 31, 1998

Saudi Arabia	3 – 1	Kazakhstan

700th Anniversary Stadium, Chiang Mai

=== Final ===
October 31, 1998

South Korea	2 – 1	Japan

700th Anniversary Stadium, Chiang Mai

== Winners ==
AFC Youth Championship
1998 winners

South Korea
Ninth title

== Qualification to World Youth Championship ==
The following teams qualified for the 1999 FIFA World Youth Championship.

- South Korea
- Japan
- Saudi Arabia
- Kazakhstan
