= Rui Moreira (footballer) =

Portuguese footballer

Personal information
- Full name: Rui Filipe Araújo Moreira
- Date of birth: 31 May 1996 (age 30)
- Place of birth: Póvoa de Varzim, Portugal
- Height: 1.72 m (5 ft 7 1/2 in)
- Position: Central midfielder

Youth career
- 2004–2007: Varzim
- 2007–2015: Porto
- 2011–2012: → Padroense (loan)

Senior career*
Years	Team	Apps	(Gls)
2015–2019	Porto B	74	(2)
2018–2019	→ Cartagena (loan)	4	(0)
2019–2021	Varzim	51	(0)
2022–2023	Leça	10	(1)
2023	Moncarapachense	15	(1)
2023–2024	Sanjoanense	19	(4)
2024-2025	Olympiakos Nicosia	26	(1)

International career^{‡}
2011–2012	Portugal U16	14	(3)
2012–2013	Portugal U17	14	(5)
2013	Portugal U18	2	(1)
2015	Portugal U19	2	(0)
2016	Portugal U20	2	(0)
- * Club domestic league appearances and goals as of 00:51, 9 May 2025 (UTC) ‡ National team caps and goals as of 28 August 2023

Rui Filipe Araújo Moreira (born 31 May 1996) is a Portuguese professional footballer who played as a midfielder for Cypriot club Olympiakos Nicosia.

== Football career ==
Born in Póvoa de Varzim, Moreira developed at hometown club Varzim before joining Porto at the age of 11. On 24 May 2015, he made his professional debut with Porto B in a 2014–15 Segunda Liga match against Marítimo B, a goalless draw. He played just over a third of the matches in 2015–16 as the reserve team won the second-tier championship, being ineligible for promotion to Primeira Liga.

On 31 August 2018, Moreira was loaned to Spanish club Cartagena, as was teammate Luís Mata. He played only four matches during his time with the Segunda División B club, one coming in the Copa del Rey.

Moreira ended his 12-year association with Porto in July 2019, when he returned to second-tier Varzim on a two-year deal.

On 23 September 2022, Moreira signed a one-year contract for Campeonato de Portugal club Leça.

On 11 January 2023, Moreira moved to Liga 3 side Moncarapachense.

On 24 August 2023, fellow Liga 3 club Sanjoanense announced the signing of Moreira for one season.
