= Gustavo Mendonça =

Portuguese footballer (born 2003)

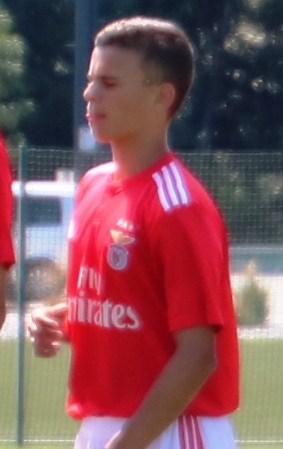
- Mendonça in 2018

Personal information
- Full name: Gustavo Pinto Mendonça
- Date of birth: 11 March 2003 (age 23)
- Place of birth: Amares, Portugal
- Height: 1.76 m (5 ft 9 in)
- Position: Midfielder

Team information
- Current team: Kairat
- Number: 22

Youth career
- 2010–2011: Amares
- 2011–2015: CB Póvoa Lanhoso
- 2015–2022: Benfica

Senior career*
Years	Team	Apps	(Gls)
2022–2023	Canelas 2010	25	(1)
2023–2026	AVS	62	(2)
2026–	Kairat	12	(0)

International career^{‡}
2019	Portugal U16	4	(0)
2020	Portugal U17	6	(0)
2022–2023	Portugal U20	4	(0)
- * Club domestic league appearances and goals as of 1 November 2026 ‡ National team caps and goals as of 15:26, 7 July 2025 (UTC)

Gustavo Pinto Mendonça (born 11 March 2003) is a Portuguese professional football player who plays as a midfielder for Kazakhstan Premier League club Kairat.

== Career ==
Mendonça is a product of the youth academies of Amares and CB Póvoa Lanhoso, before joining Benfica's youth teams in 2015. On 7 October 2019, he signed his first professional contract with Benfica. On 17 July 2022, he transferred to Canelas 2010 in the Liga 3. On 5 August 2023, he transferred to the Liga Portugal 2 side AVS on a contract until 2026, and in his debut season helped them get promoted to the Primeira Liga. On 3 July 2025, he extended his contract with AVS until 2028.

== International career ==
Mendonça is a youth international for Portugal, having played up to the Portugal U20s in friendly tournaments.

== Career statistics ==
As of match played 15 October 2026

Appearances and goals by club, season and competition
Club	Season	League			Cup		League Cup		Europe		Other		Total	
Club	Season	Division	Apps	Goals	Apps	Goals	Apps	Goals	Apps	Goals	Apps	Goals	Apps	Goals
Canelas 2010	2022–23	Liga 3	25	1	3	0	—		—		—		28	1
AVS	2023–24	Liga Portugal 2	23	1	2	0	2	0	—		1 (Note: Appearances in promotion play-offs)	0	28	1
AVS	2024–25	Primeira Liga	18	1	1	0	0	0	—		—		19	1
AVS	2025–26	Primeira Liga	21	0	2	0	—		—		—		23	0
AVS	Total		62	2	5	0	2	0	—		1	0	70	2
Kairat	2026	Kazakhstan Premier League	9	0	0	0	—		7 (Note: Four appearances in UEFA Champions League, two appearances in UEFA Europa League, one appearance in UEFA Conference League)	0	—		16	0
Career total			96	3	8	0	2	0	7	0	1	0	114	3
