= Luís Mata =

Portuguese footballer (born 1997)

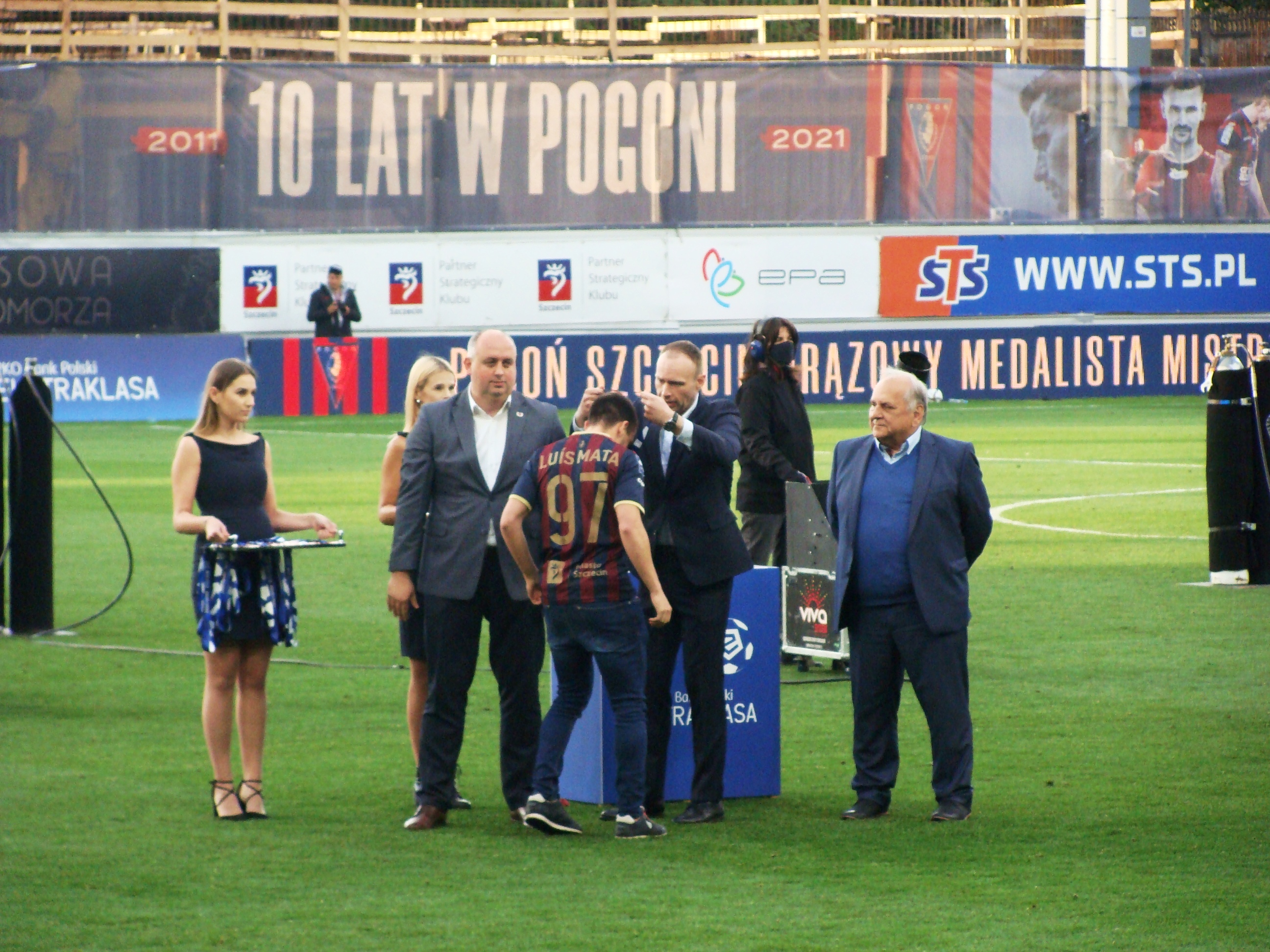
- Mata receiving a medal for Ekstraklasa third-place finish in 2021

Personal information
- Full name: Luís Carlos Machado Mata
- Date of birth: 6 July 1997 (age 29)
- Place of birth: Porto, Portugal
- Height: 1.77 m (5 ft 10 in)
- Position: Left-back

Team information
- Current team: Kairat
- Number: 3

Youth career
- 2005–2006: Oliveira do Douro
- 2006–2016: Porto

Senior career*
Years	Team	Apps	(Gls)
2016–2020	Porto B	62	(1)
2017	→ Portimonense (loan)	17	(0)
2018–2019	→ Cartagena (loan)	16	(0)
2020–2023	Pogoń Szczecin	61	(0)
2020	Pogoń Szczecin II	2	(0)
2023–2025	Zagłębie Lubin	26	(0)
2023	Zagłębie Lubin II	4	(0)
2025	→ Kairat (loan)	11	(0)
2025–	Kairat	39	(2)

International career
2011	Portugal U15	2	(0)
2012–2013	Portugal U16	14	(5)
2012–2014	Portugal U17	22	(3)
2015	Portugal U18	7	(0)
2016	Portugal U19	6	(0)
2017	Portugal U21	1	(0)
- * Club domestic league appearances and goals as of 1 November 2026

Luís Carlos Machado Mata (born 6 July 1997) is a Portuguese professional footballer who plays as a left-back for Kazakh club Kairat.

== Club career ==
=== Porto B ===
Born in Porto, Mata came through the ranks of hometown club Porto. On 7 August 2016, he made his professional debut with Porto B in a 2016–17 LigaPro match against Aves, a 2–1 away loss. The following January, he was loaned to Portimonense of the same league for the rest of the season.

On 27 September 2017, Mata scored his only goal for Porto B to conclude a 2–0 home win over Cova da Piedade. The following 6 March, he had his one call-up to the first team, remaining unused in a goalless draw away to Liverpool after the Dragons had already lost the first leg of the UEFA Champions League last 16 5–0 at home.

Mata was loaned to Cartagena of the Spanish Segunda División B on 31 August 2018, along with teammates Rui Moreira and João Costa. Under manager Gustavo Munúa, he was fourth choice in his primary position, but made more appearances in the second half of the season at right back due to an injury crisis.

On 5 January 2020, captain Mata was sent off in the 17th minute of Porto B's 3–1 home loss to Académica de Coimbra for giving away a penalty, from which Zé Castro opened the scoring.

=== Pogoń Szczecin ===
On 9 July 2020, Mata ended his 13-year stay with Porto with 12 months of his contract remaining, to sign a three-year deal at Pogoń Szczecin in the Polish Ekstraklasa. He joined his compatriot former teammate Tomás Podstawski at the club.

=== Zagłębie Lubin ===
On 8 February 2023, having lost his spot in the line-up to Léo Borges in the latter half of 2022, and with Leonardo Koutris' arrival in the winter, Mata left Pogoń for another Ekstraklasa team, Zagłębie Lubin, penning a deal until June 2025.

==== Loan to Kairat ====
On 27 February 2025, Mata moved to Kazakh club Kairat on loan for the remainder of the season.

On 16 November 2026, Kairat announced that Mata had extended his contract with the club until the end of the 2028 season.

== Career statistics ==
As of match played 15 October 2026

Appearances and goals by club, season and competition
Club	Season	League			Cup		Europe		Other		Total	
Club	Season	Division	Apps	Goals	Apps	Goals	Apps	Goals	Apps	Goals	Apps	Goals
Porto B	2016–17	Liga Portugal 2	16	0	—		—		—		16	0
Porto B	2017–18	Liga Portugal 2	23	1	—		—		—		23	1
Porto B	2019–20	Liga Portugal 2	23	0	—		—		—		23	0
Porto B	Total		62	1	—		—		—		62	1
Portimonense (loan)	2016–17	Primeira Liga	17	0	—		—		—		17	0
Cartagena (loan)	2018–19	Segunda División B	12	0	1	0	—		4 (Note: Appearances in Segunda División B play-offs)	0	17	0
Pogoń Szczecin	2020–21	Ekstraklasa	18	0	1	0	—		—		19	0
Pogoń Szczecin	2021–22	Ekstraklasa	30	0	0	0	2 (Note: Appearances in UEFA Conference League)	0	—		32	0
Pogoń Szczecin	2022–23	Ekstraklasa	13	0	1	0	4	0	—		18	0
Pogoń Szczecin	Total		61	0	2	0	6	0	—		69	0
Pogoń Szczecin II	2020–21	III liga	2	0	—		—		—		2	0
Zagłębie Lubin	2022–23	Ekstraklasa	3	0	—		—		—		3	0
Zagłębie Lubin	2023–24	Ekstraklasa	13	0	2	0	—		—		15	0
Zagłębie Lubin	2024–25	Ekstraklasa	10	0	2	0	—		—		12	0
Zagłębie Lubin	Total		26	0	4	0	—		—		30	0
Zagłębie Lubin II	2022–23	II liga	1	0	—		—		—		1	0
Zagłębie Lubin II	2023–24	II liga	3	0	—		—		—		3	0
Zagłębie Lubin II	Total		4	0	—		—		—		4	0
Kairat (loan)	2025	Kazakhstan Premier League	11	0	2	0	—		—		13	0
Kairat	2025	Kazakhstan Premier League	11	0	—		12 (Note: Appearances in UEFA Champions League)	0	—		23	0
Kairat	2026	Kazakhstan Premier League	26	3	0	0	11 (Note: Eight appearances in UEFA Champions League, two appearances in UEFA Europa League, one appearance in UEFA Conference League)	0	1 (Note: Appearance in Kazakhstan Super Cup)	0	38	3
Kairat	Total		37	3	0	0	23	0	1	0	61	3
Career total			234	4	9	0	28	0	5	0	275	4

== Honours ==
Kairat

- Kazakhstan Premier League: 2025
