= FC Arman =

FC Arman (Kazakh: Арман футбол клубы, Arman Fýtbol Klýby) are a defunct Kazakhstani football based in Kentau. They were members of the inaugural 1992 Kazakhstan Premier League, immediately experiencing relegation to the Kazakhstan First Division.

== Name History ==
- 1968 : Founded as Gornyak
- 1992 : The club is renamed Arman
