= Kazakhstan national under-19 football team =

Kazakhstan Under-19
- Association: Football Federation of Kazakhstan (FFK)
- Confederation: UEFA (Europe)
- Head coach: Sergey Labodovskiy
- FIFA code: KAZ
First colours	Second colours

First international
- Kazakhstan 2–3 Iraq (Jakarta, Indonesia – 11 September 1994)

Biggest win
- Greece 2–4 Kazakhstan (Nesebar, Bulgaria – 22 October 2006)

Biggest defeat
- Sweden 9–2 Kazakhstan (Stockholm, Sweden – c. 2004)

FIFA U-20 World Cup
- Appearances: 1 (first in 1999)
- Best result: Group stage (1999)

AFC U-20 Asian Cup
- Appearances: 2 (first in 1994)
- Best result: 4th place (1998)

The Kazakhstan national under-19 football team is the national under-19 football team of Kazakhstan and is controlled by the Football Federation of Kazakhstan. The team competes in the UEFA European Under-19 Championship, held every year. Previously, the team participated in the AFC U-20 Asian Cup.

== Current squad ==
The following players were called up for 2027 UEFA European Under-19 Championship qualification matches against Portugal, Serbia, and Greece on 3, 6, and 9 June 2026; respectively.

No.	Pos.	Player	Date of birth (age)	Club
1	GK	Sherkhan Kalmurza	15 June 2007 (age 19)	(Kazakhstan Football Federation) Kairat
12	GK	Sayatkhan Kusainov	6 September 2007 (age 19)	(Kazakhstan Football Federation) Aktobe
23	GK	Dias Reimov	9 March 2007 (age 19)	(Kazakhstan Football Federation) Caspiy
25	GK	Danil Asymzhan	21 April 2007 (age 19)	(Kazakhstan Football Federation) Khan Tengri
3	DF	Abzal Sagyn	12 April 2007 (age 19)	(Kazakhstan Football Federation) Astana
4	DF	Amirbek Bazarbaev	2 January 2007 (age 19)	(Kazakhstan Football Federation) Kairat
6	DF	Ali Akylbaev	1 April 2007 (age 19)	(Kazakhstan Football Federation) Shakhter
15	DF	Rayimbek Kenesbekov	30 January 2008 (age 18)	(Kazakhstan Football Federation) Kairat
16	DF	Shyngys Kaliev	4 August 2008 (age 18)	(Royal Spanish Football Federation) Levante
18	DF	Alikhan Zheksenbek	21 May 2008 (age 18)	(Kazakhstan Football Federation) Astana
24	DF	Ivan Pivovarov	4 March 2007 (age 19)	(Kazakhstan Football Federation) Tobol
2	DF	Daniyar Tashpulatov	21 August 2007 (age 19)	(Kazakhstan Football Federation) Kairat
22	DF	Amanzhol Bakitzhanov	24 December 2007 (age 18)	(Kazakhstan Football Federation) Tobol
5	DF	Temirlan Torebek	10 June 2007 (age 19)	(Kazakhstan Football Federation) Taraz
8	DF	Akezhan Kalikulov	2 April 2008 (age 18)	(Kazakhstan Football Federation) Kairat
21	MF	Daniyal Nazarov	5 April 2008 (age 18)	(Kazakhstan Football Federation) Shakhter
19	MF	Evgeniy Petrik	31 May 2008 (age 18)	(Kazakhstan Football Federation) Kairat
20	MF	Karim Makhametzhan	11 October 2007 (age 19)	(Kazakhstan Football Federation) Kairat
11	MF	Azamat Tuyakbaev (captain)	13 July 2007 (age 19)	(Kazakhstan Football Federation) Kairat
7	MF	Mukhamedali Abish	22 October 2007 (age 19)	(Kazakhstan Football Federation) Kairat
14	MF	Aldiyar Nurgali	11 March 2008 (age 18)	(Royal Spanish Football Federation) Levante
13	FW	Maksat Abraev	13 February 2008 (age 18)	(Kazakhstan Football Federation) Astana
17	FW	Ismail Bekbolat	10 January 2008 (age 18)	(Kazakhstan Football Federation) Kairat
9	FW	Mansur Birkurmanov	4 April 2007 (age 19)	(Kazakhstan Football Federation) Jetisu
10	FW	Abylay Toleukhan	23 August 2008 (age 18)	(Kazakhstan Football Federation) Kairat

== FIFA U-20 World Cup ==
FIFA U-20 World Cup record
Year	Result	Pld	W	D	L	GF	GA
(Tunisia) 1977	Part of the Soviet Union						
(Japan) 1979	Part of the Soviet Union						
(Australia) 1981	Part of the Soviet Union						
(Mexico) 1983	Part of the Soviet Union						
(Soviet Union) 1985	Part of the Soviet Union						
(Chile) 1987	Part of the Soviet Union						
(Saudi Arabia) 1989	Part of the Soviet Union						
(Portugal) 1991	Part of the Soviet Union						
(Australia) 1993	did not enter						
(Qatar) 1995	did not qualify						
(Malaysia) 1997	did not qualify						
(Nigeria) 1999	Group stage	3	0	0	3	1	9
(Argentina) 2001	did not qualify						
(United Arab Emirates) 2003	did not qualify						
(Netherlands) 2005	did not qualify						
(Canada) 2007	did not qualify						
(Egypt) 2009	did not qualify						
(Colombia) 2011	did not qualify						
(Turkey) 2013	did not qualify						
(New Zealand) 2015	did not qualify						
(South Korea) 2017	did not qualify						
(Poland) 2019	did not qualify						
(Indonesia) ~~2021~~	Competition cancelled						
(Argentina) 2023	did not qualify						
(Chile) 2025	did not qualify						
(Azerbaijan) (Uzbekistan) 2027	To be determined						
(Armenia) (Georgia (country)) 2029	To be determined						
Total:1/26	Group stage	3	0	0	3	1	9

== AFC U-20 Asian Cup ==
AFC U-20 Asian Cup
Year	Round	Pld	W	D	L	GF	GA
(Indonesia) 1994	Group stage	4	0	0	4	5	15
(Thailand) 1998	Fourth place	6	2	2	2	10	10
Total:2/5	Fourth place	10	2	2	6	15	25

== UEFA European Under-19 Championship record ==
UEFA European Under-19 Championship
Year	Round	Pld	W	D	L	GF	GA
(Switzerland) 2004	did not qualify						
(Northern Ireland) 2005	did not qualify						
(Poland) 2006	did not qualify						
(Austria) 2007	did not qualify						
(Czech Republic) 2008	did not qualify						
(Ukraine) 2009	did not qualify						
(France) 2010	did not qualify						
(Romania) 2011	did not qualify						
(Estonia) 2012	did not qualify						
(Lithuania) 2013	did not qualify						
(Hungary) 2014	did not qualify						
(Greece) 2015	did not qualify						
(Germany) 2016	did not qualify						
(Georgia (country)) 2017	did not qualify						
(Finland) 2018	did not qualify						
(Armenia) 2019	did not qualify						
(Slovakia) 2022	did not qualify						
(Malta) 2023	did not qualify						
(Northern Ireland) 2024	did not qualify						
(Romania) 2025	did not qualify						
(Wales) 2026	Qualification in progress						
(Czech Republic) 2027	Qualification in progress						
Total:0/20	-	0	0	0	0	0	0

== Head-to-head record ==
The following table shows Kazakhstan's head-to-head record in the FIFA U-20 World Cup and AFC U-20 Asian Cup.

=== In FIFA U-20 World Cup ===
Opponent	Pld	W	D	L	GF	GA	GD	Win %
Argentina	1	0	0	1	0	1	−1	0.00
Croatia	1	0	0	1	1	5	−4	0.00
Ghana	1	0	0	1	0	3	−3	0.00
Total	3	0	0	3	1	9	−8	0.00

=== In AFC U-20 Asian Cup ===
Opponent	Pld	W	D	L	GF	GA	GD	Win %
India	1	1	0	0	3	2	+1	100.00
Indonesia	1	0	0	1	0	3	−3	0.00
Iraq	1	0	0	1	2	3	−1	0.00
Kuwait	1	1	0	0	2	0	+2	100.00
Qatar	1	0	0	1	2	3	−1	0.00
Saudi Arabia	2	0	0	2	2	5	−3	0.00
South Korea	1	0	1	0	2	2	+0	0.00
Syria	1	0	0	1	1	6	−5	0.00
Thailand	1	0	1	0	1	1	+0	0.00
Total	10	2	2	6	15	25	−10	20.00

== See also ==
- Kazakhstan national football team
- Kazakhstan national under-21 football team
- Kazakhstan national under-17 football team
