= Oiva Jukkola =

Finnish footballer (born 2002)

Personal information
- Date of birth: 21 May 2002 (age 24)
- Place of birth: Tampere, Finland
- Height: 1.86 m (6 ft 1 in)
- Position: Winger

Team information
- Current team: Kairat
- Number: 19

Youth career
- –2010: PJK
- 2010–2020: Ilves

Senior career*
Years	Team	Apps	(Gls)
2020–2022	Ilves II	46	(5)
2020–2026	Ilves	100	(18)
2026–	Kairat	29	(6)

International career^{‡}
2024–2025	Finland U21	7	(2)
2025–	Finland	6	(0)
- * Club domestic league appearances and goals as of 1 November 2026 ‡ National team caps and goals as of 7 October 2026

Oiva Jukkola (born 21 May 2002) is a Finnish professional football player who plays as a winger for Kazakhstan Premier League side Kairat and for the Finland national team.

== Early life ==
After starting football in a youth team of Pirkkalan Jalkapalloklubi (PJK), Jukkola spent his youth years with Ilves since 2010 and is a product of the club's youth academy.

== Club career ==
=== Ilves ===
He debuted in top-tier Veikkausliiga with Ilves first team in the 2020 season. He also played for the club's reserve team in the third-tier Kakkonen. Jukkola won the 2023 Finnish Cup title with Ilves, after defeating Honka 2–1 in the final. On 31 October 2023, Ilves announced that they had signed with Jukkola on a new deal until the end of 2025. He was named in the Veikkausliiga Team of the Month in June 2024. Jukkola represented Ilves in three games in the 2024–25 UEFA Conference League qualifiers, helping his side to advance to the 3rd round by defeating Austria Wien. At the end of the season, Jukkola helped Ilves to finish as Veikkausliiga runners-up, and he was named in the Team of the Year. On 20 May 2025, Jukkola's contract was extended for the 2026 season.

=== Kairat ===
In February 2026, he joined Kazakhstan Premier League club Kairat on a contract until the end of the 2027 season, for an undisclosed fee.

== International career ==
Jukkola received his first call-up to represent his country, when he was named in the Finland U21 squad for the 2025 UEFA U21 Euro qualifying matches against Armenia and Romania. He made his international debut on 6 September 2024 against Armenia, scoring a brace in a 3–1 away win. Jukkola was named in the Finland squad for the final tournament, where he played in a match against Denmark as a substitute.

Jukkola made his full international debut for the Finland national team on 4 September 2025 in a friendly match against Norway.

== Personal life ==
His twin brother Elmo has also played football.

Jukkola fulfilled his mandatory conscription service in Santahamina, Helsinki, between early October 2023 and late March 2024.

== Career statistics ==
=== Club ===
As of 15 October 2026

Appearances and goals by club, season and competition
Club	Season	Division	League		National cup (Note: Includes Suomen Cup)		League cup (Note: Includes Kakkonen Cup and Finnish League Cup)		Continental		Other		Total	
Club	Season	Division	Apps	Goals	Apps	Goals	Apps	Goals	Apps	Goals	Apps	Goals	Apps	Goals
Ilves II	2020	Kakkonen	16	1	–		2	1	–		–		18	2
Ilves II	2021	Kakkonen	14	3	–		4	4	–		–		18	7
Ilves II	2022	Kakkonen	16	1	3	2	–		–		–		19	3
Ilves II	Total		46	5	3	2	6	5	–	–	–	–	55	12
Ilves	2020	Veikkausliiga	2	0	0	0	–		0	0	–		2	0
Ilves	2021	Veikkausliiga	10	1	0	0	–		–		–		10	1
Ilves	2022	Veikkausliiga	7	2	0	0	0	0	–		–		7	2
Ilves	2023	Veikkausliiga	27	3	5	1	5	0	–		–		37	4
Ilves	2024	Veikkausliiga	26	5	1	0	6	1	3 (Note: Appearances UEFA Conference League)	0	–		36	6
Ilves	2025	Veikkausliiga	28	7	1	0	4	1	4 (Note: Appearances in UEFA Europa League and UEFA Conference League)	0	–		37	8
Ilves	Total		100	18	7	1	15	2	7	0	0	0	129	21
Kairat	2026	Kazakhstan Premier League	26	6	0	0	–		9 (Note: Six appearances in UEFA Champions League, two appearances in UEFA Europa League, one appearance in UEFA Conference League)	0	1 (Note: Appearance in Kazakhstan Super Cup)	0	36	6
Career total			172	29	10	3	21	7	16	0	1	0	219	39

=== International ===
As of match played 6 October 2026

National team	Year	Competitive		Friendly		Total	
National team	Year	Apps	Goals	Apps	Goals	Apps	Goals
Finland	2025	1 (Note: Appearance in the 2026 FIFA World Cup qualification.)	0	1	0	2	0
Finland	2026	2 (Note: Appearances in the 2026–27 UEFA Nations League C.)	0	2 (Note: Includes one appearance in the 2026 FIFA Series.)	0	4	0
Total		3	0	3	0	6	0

== Honours ==
Ilves

- Finnish Cup: 2023
- Veikkausliiga runner-up: 2024

Finland

- FIFA Series: 2026

Individual

- Veikkausliiga Team of the Year: 2024
