= Jaakko Oksanen =

Finnish footballer (born 2000)

Personal information
- Full name: Jaakko Tapio Oksanen
- Date of birth: 7 November 2000 (age 26)
- Place of birth: Tuusula, Finland
- Height: 1.84 m (6 ft 0 in)
- Position: Midfielder

Team information
- Current team: Kairat
- Number: 13

Youth career
- KP-75
- KOPSE
- 2013–2017: HJK

Senior career*
Years	Team	Apps	(Gls)
2016–2017	Klubi 04	23	(2)
2017–2018	HJK	1	(0)
2018–2022	Brentford	2	(0)
2020–2021	→ AFC Wimbledon (loan)	27	(0)
2021–2022	→ Greenock Morton (loan)	13	(0)
2022–2025	KuPS	89	(6)
2026–	Kairat	28	(3)

International career^{‡}
2016	Finland U16	3	(0)
2016	Finland U17	6	(1)
2017	Finland U18	2	(1)
2017–2018	Finland U19	16	(0)
2019–2021	Finland U21	15	(0)
2023–	Finland	3	(1)
Medal record
KuPS
Second place	Veikkausliiga	2022
Second place	Veikkausliiga	2023
First place	Finnish Cup	2022
- * Club domestic league appearances and goals as of 1 November 2026 ‡ National team caps and goals as of 30 March 2026

Jaakko Tapio Oksanen (born 7 November 2000) is a Finnish professional footballer who plays as a midfielder for Kazakhstan Premier League club Kairat and the Finland national football team.

Oksanen is a product of the HJK Helsinki academy in his native Finland. Following 4 1/2 years in England with Brentford, he returned to Finland to join KuPS in 2022, and in December 2025, he went to the FC Kairat. Oksanen is a current Finland international.

== Club career ==
=== HJK Helsinki ===
A holding midfielder, Oksanen began his career in his native Finland as a youth with Keravan Pallo -75 and KOPSE, before entering the academy at Veikkausliiga club HJK Helsinki at the age of 12. He made his debut for Klubi 04 during an injury-hit 2016 season and signed a new one-year contract in December 2016. Oksanen made 24 appearances and scored two goals during a successful 2017 season for Klubi 04, which ended with promotion to the Ykkönen, via the playoffs. One week after the playoff victory, Oksanen made his senior debut for HJK Helsinki, as an 81st-minute substitute for Evans Mensah in a 3–2 defeat to RoPS on 28 October 2017. It proved to be his only appearance for the first team and he departed the Telia 5G -areena on 13 January 2018.

=== Brentford ===
On 13 January 2018, Oksanen moved to England to sign for the B team at Championship club Brentford on a 2 1/2-year contract for an undisclosed fee. An injury crisis saw Oksanen feature as an unused substitute during three first team matches in November 2018, before he suffered an ankle ligament injury. After returning to fitness, Oksanen was a regular inclusion in matchday squads during the final two months of the 2018–19 season and made his debut as a substitute for Sergi Canós late in a 3–0 victory over Preston North End on the final day. He was also a member of the B team's 2018–19 Middlesex Senior Cup-winning squad.

Oksanen spent the majority of the 2019–20 pre-season with the first team squad and made two appearances during the regular season. Entering the final months of his contract, Oksanen signed a two-year extension in March 2020 and his B team performances were recognised with the team's 2019–20 Player of the Year award. On 13 August 2020, Oksanen joined League One club AFC Wimbledon on a season-long loan. Either side of two months out due to a mid-season ankle injury, he made 30 appearances during his spell.

On 31 August 2021, Oksanen joined Scottish Championship club Greenock Morton on loan until 3 January 2022 and made 16 appearances during his spell. He played the remainder of the 2021–22 season with Brentford B and was a part of the London Senior Cup-winning squad. Following 4 1/2 years with Brentford (during which he made 88 B team appearances and three first team appearances), Oksanen was released when his contract expired at the end of the 2021–22 season.

=== KuPS ===
On 10 July 2022, Oksanen joined Veikkausliiga club KuPS on a free transfer and signed an 18-month contract, with the option of a further year, effective 13 July 2022. During the remainder of the 2022 season, he made 17 appearances, scored two goals, and was a part of the club's 2022 Finnish Cup-winning squad. In recognition of his performances, Oksanen was voted the club's Player of the Year and Young Player of the Year and he was twice named in the Veikkausliiga Team of the Month.

Oksanen made 32 appearances and scored one goal in all competitions during a 2023 season which culminated in KuPS missing out on the Veikkausliiga championship on goal difference. On 3 November 2023, the club exercised its one-year option on his contract. Oksanen ended the double-winning 2024 season with a career-high 39 appearances and three goals.

After Oksanen's contract expired at the turn of the year, positive negotiations resulted in him signing a new one-year contract in February 2025. On 22 July, Oksanen scored a goal for KuPS against Kairat Almaty, in a 2–0 first leg win in the second round of the UEFA Champions League qualification campaign.

=== Kairat ===
In December 2025, Kazakhstan Premier League club Kairat Almaty strengthened its squad with Finnish midfielder Jaakko Oksanen. The Almaty club signed the 25-year-old player to a contract until December 2027.

== International career ==
Oksanen has been capped by Finland at U16, U17, U18, U19 and U21 level. He appeared in each of Finland's three matches at the 2018 European U19 Championship and his development during 2018 was recognised with the SPL Most Promising Young Player of the Year award.

Oksanen won his maiden call into the full Finland squad for a January 2023 training camp in Algarve, which included two friendly matches. He made his senior international debut with a start in the second match, a 1–0 defeat to Estonia.

== Career statistics ==
=== Club ===
As of 15 October 2026

Appearances and goals by club, season and competition
Club	Season	League			National cup (Note: Includes Finnish Cup, FA Cup, Scottish Cup)		League cup (Note: Includes EFL Cup, Scottish League Cup, Finnish League Cup)		Europe		Other		Total	
Club	Season	Division	Apps	Goals	Apps	Goals	Apps	Goals	Apps	Goals	Apps	Goals	Apps	Goals
Klubi 04	2016	Kakkonen Group B	1	0	—		—		—		—		1	0
Klubi 04	2017	Kakkonen Group A	20	2	2	0	—		—		2 (Note: Appearances in Kakkonen play-offs)	0	24	2
Klubi 04	Total		21	2	2	0	—		—		2	0	25	2
HJK Helsinki	2017	Veikkausliiga	1	0	0	0	—		0	0	—		1	0
Brentford	2018–19	Championship	1	0	0	0	0	0	—		—		1	0
Brentford	2019–20	Championship	1	0	1	0	0	0	—		0	0	2	0
Brentford	Total		2	0	1	0	0	0	—		0	0	3	0
AFC Wimbledon (loan)	2020–21	League One	27	0	0	0	—		—		3 (Note: Appearance in EFL Trophy)	0	30	0
Greenock Morton (loan)	2021–22	Scottish Championship	13	0	2	0	0	0	—		1 (Note: Appearance in Scottish Challenge Cup)	0	16	0
KuPS	2022	Veikkausliiga	12	2	1	0	—		4 (Note: Appearance(s) in UEFA Conference League)	0	—		17	2
KuPS	2023	Veikkausliiga	24	0	3	1	3	0	2	0	—		32	1
KuPS	2024	Veikkausliiga	24	3	5	0	6	0	4	0	—		39	3
KuPS	2025	Veikkausliiga	29	1	5	0	4	0	14 (Note: Four appearances and one goal in UEFA Champions League, four appearances and one goal in UEFA Europa League, and six appearances and one goal in UEFA Conference League)	3	—		52	4
KuPS	Total		89	6	14	1	13	0	24	3	—		140	10
Kairat	2026	Kazakhstan Premier League	25	2	0	0	0	0	9 (Note: Six appearances in UEFA Champions League, two appearances in UEFA Europa League, one appearance in UEFA Conference League)	0	1 (Note: Appearance in Kazakhstan Super Cup)	1	35	3
Career total			178	10	19	1	13	0	33	3	7	1	250	15

=== International ===
As of match played 30 March 2026

National team	Year	Competitive		Friendly		Total	
National team	Year	Apps	Goals	Apps	Goals	Apps	Goals
Finland	2023	0	0	1	0	1	0
Finland	2024	0	0	0	0	0	0
Finland	2025	0	0	0	0	0	0
Finland	2026	0	0	2 (Note: Includes two appearances in the 2026 FIFA Series.)	1	2	1
Total		0	0	3	1	3	1

Scores and results list Finland's goal tally first, score column indicates score after each Oksanen goal.

List of international goals scored by Jaakko Oksanen
No.	Date	Venue	Cap	Opponent	Score	Result	Competition
1	27 March 2026	Eden Park, Auckland, New Zealand	2	New Zealand	2–0	2–0	2026 FIFA Series

== Honours ==
Klubi 04

- Kakkonen play-offs: 2017

Brentford B

- Middlesex Senior Cup: 2018–19
- London Senior Cup: 2021–22

KuPS

- Veikkausliiga: 2024, 2025
- Veikkausliiga runner-up: 2022, 2023
- Finnish Cup: 2022, 2024
- Finnish Cup runner-up: 2025
- Finnish League Cup runner-up: 2024

Finland

- FIFA Series: 2026

Individual

- Football Association of Finland Most Promising Young Player of the Year: 2018
- Brentford B Player of the Year: 2019–20
- Veikkausliiga Team of the Month: August 2022, October 2022
- KuPS Player of the Year: 2022
- KuPS Young Player of the Year: 2022
