= Edmilson (footballer, born 1997) =

Brazilian footballer

Personal information
- Full name: Edmilson de Paula Santos Filho
- Date of birth: 19 April 1997 (age 29)
- Place of birth: Mogi das Cruzes, Brazil
- Height: 1.90 m (6 ft 3 in)
- Position: Forward

Team information
- Current team: Kairat
- Number: 26

Youth career
- 2015: União Mogi
- 2016–2017: Audax

Senior career*
Years	Team	Apps	(Gls)
2019	Velo Clube	0	(0)
2019–2021	Marco	18	(15)
2021–2023	Länk Vilaverdense	55	(24)
2023–2025	Celje	47	(12)
2025–	Kairat	35	(14)
- * Club domestic league appearances and goals as of 1 November 2026

Edmilson de Paula Santos Filho (born 19 April 1997), simply known as Edmilson, is a Brazilian professional footballer who plays as a forward for Kazakhstan Premier League club Kairat.

He spent his early senior career in Portugal, and was the joint top scorer in 2022–23 as Länk Vilaverdense won promotion from Liga 3. He then moved to Celje, winning the Slovenian PrvaLiga and the Slovenian Football Cup in his respective seasons.

== Career ==
=== Early career ===
Born in Mogi das Cruzes in São Paulo state, Edmilson scored 12 goals in as many games for A.D. Marco 09 in the Porto Football Association's premier district league, leading to a transfer to Vilaverdense FC of the third-tier Campeonato de Portugal in January 2021. His first full season with the team from Vila Verde saw them promoted to Liga 3. In 2022–23, he was the league's joint second top scorer with 12 goals from 26 games, adding another on 21 May 2023 in a 2–1 home win over S.C. Braga B in a successful playoff campaign.

=== Celje ===
On 28 June 2023, Edmilson signed a two-year contract at NK Celje, runners-up of the previous season of the Slovenian PrvaLiga. He made his debut on 27 July in his first game in continental competition, scoring in a 4–3 home loss to Vitória de Guimarães in the second qualifying round of the UEFA Europa League; his opponents were from the Minho Province, where his previous club was from. He scored six times in his first league season, including a first-half hat-trick on 21 October in a 4–0 win at NK Rogaška, as his team won the league.

Edmilson scored another hat-trick on 30 October 2024 in an 8–0 win away to fifth-tier NK Hodoš in the last 32 of the Slovenian Football Cup. On 19 December, he scored twice in a 3–2 home victory over The New Saints of Wales in the league phase of the Conference League. Celje ended the season by winning the national cup, and Edmilson was released at the end of his contract. He played 73 games over all competitions, and scored 19 goals.

=== Kairat ===
On 13 June 2025, Edmilson signed a two-year contract with FC Kairat, champions of the Kazakhstan Premier League. His club became only the second from their nation to reach the UEFA Champions League league phase, in which they debuted with the competition's longest ever trip to Sporting CP in Portugal; he scored a consolation goal in a 4–1 loss.

== Career statistics ==
As of match played 15 October 2026

Appearances and goals by club, season and competition
Club	Season	League			Cup		Continental		Other		Total	
Club	Season	Division	Apps	Goals	Apps	Goals	Apps	Goals	Apps	Goals	Apps	Goals
Velo Cube	2019	Campeonato Paulista Série A3	—		—		—		0	0	0	0
Marco	2019–20	Porto Football Association	6	3	—		—		—		6	3
Marco	2020–21	Porto Football Association	12	12	—		—		—		12	12
Marco	Total		18	15	—		—		—		18	15
Vilaverdense	2020–21	Campeonato de Portugal	4	2	0	0	—		—		4	2
Vilaverdense	2021–22	Campeonato de Portugal	23	9	1	0	—		—		24	9
Vilaverdense	2022–23	Liga 3	28	13	3	2	—		2 (Note: Appearances in play-offs)	0	33	15
Vilaverdense	Total		55	24	4	2	—		2	0	61	26
Celje	2023–24	Slovenian PrvaLiga	20	6	1	1	4 (Note: Appearances in UEFA Conference League)	1	—		25	8
Celje	2024–25	Slovenian PrvaLiga	27	6	3	3	19 (Note: Three appearances in UEFA Champions League, two appearances in UEFA Europa League, fourteen appearances and two goals in UEFA Conference League)	2	—		49	11
Celje	Total		47	12	4	4	23	3	—		74	19
Kairat	2025	Kazakhstan Premier League	8	4	0	0	12 (Note: Appearances in UEFA Champions League)	1	—		20	5
Kairat	2026	Kazakhstan Premier League	25	9	0	0	11 (Note: Eight appearances in UEFA Champions League, two appearances in UEFA Europa League, one appearance in UEFA Conference League)	1	1 (Note: Appearance in Kazakhstan Super Cup)	0	36	10
Kairat	Total		33	13	0	0	23	2	1	0	57	15
Career total			152	64	8	6	46	5	1	0	209	75

== Honours ==
Celje

- Slovenian PrvaLiga: 2023–24
- Slovenian Football Cup: 2024–25

Kairat

- Kazakhstan Premier League: 2025
