= Aleksandr Zarutsky =

Kazakh footballer (born 1993)

Personal information
- Full name: Aleksandr Aleksandrovich Zarutsky
- Date of birth: 23 August 1993 (age 33)
- Place of birth: Nalchik, Russia
- Height: 1.92 m (6 ft 4 in)
- Position: Goalkeeper

Team information
- Current team: Aktobe
- Number: 16

Youth career
- 2011–2013: Shakhter Karagandy

Senior career*
| Years | Team | Apps | (Gls) |
| 2013–2015 | Shakhter Karagandy | 10 | (0) |
| 2017 | Kyzylzhar | 1 | (0) |
| 2017–2019 | Kubanskaya Korona Shevchenko | ? | (0) |
| 2019 | Atyrau | 2 | (0) |
| 2019–2020 | Irtysh Pavlodar | 7 | (0) |
| 2019 | → Irtysh M (loan) | 1 | (0) |
| 2020–2021 | Kaisar | 17 | (0) |
| 2021–2025 | Astana | 33 | (0) |
| 2021–2022 | → Astana-Zhastar (loan) | 5 | (0) |
| 2025 | Kairat | 15 | (0) |
| 2026– | Aktobe | 29 | (0) |

International career^{‡}
| 2014 | Kazakhstan U21 | 2 | (0) |
| 2024– | Kazakhstan | 5 | (0) |
- * Club domestic league appearances and goals as of 1 November 2026 ‡ National team caps and goals as of 2 October 2026

Aleksandr Aleksandrovich Zarutsky (Russian: Александр Александрович Заруцкий; born 23 August 1993) is a professional footballer who plays as a goalkeeper for Aktobe in the Kazakhstan Premier League. Born in Russia, he represents the Kazakhstan national team.

== Early life ==
Zarutsky was born in Nalchik, Russia and moved to Karaganda, Kazakhstan at a young age.

== Club career ==
=== Shakhter Karagandy ===
Zarutsky joined the youth team at Shakhter Karagandy in 2011, and was promoted to the senior team in 2013. He made his debut as a substitute on 19 October 2013 in a 4–0 loss against Aktobe. His first start came on 7 March 2015 in a 0–0 draw against Taraz.

=== Kyzylzhar and Kubanskaya Korona Shevchenko ===
He joined Kyzylzhar in February 2017, making one appearance. He then moved to Russian side Kubanskaya Korona Shevchenko until January 2019.

=== Atyrau, Irtysh Pavlodar, and Kaisar ===
Zarutsky joined Atyrau in January 2019, debuting on 10 April 2019 in a 1–0 win against Zhetysu. He then played for Irtysh Pavlodar (7 apps) and on loan at Irtysh M (1 app). He moved to Kaisar in 2020, debuting in a 1–0 victory over Shakhter Karagandy and made his UEFA Europa League debut against APOEL on 17 September 2020.

=== Astana ===
He signed with Astana in January 2021, debuting in the 2021 Kazakhstan Super Cup final. He appeared in UEFA Conference League matches and played for the reserve team Astana-Zhastar between 2021 and 2022. With Astana, he won the 2022 Kazakhstan Premier League title.

=== Kairat ===
Zarutsky joined Kairat for the 2025 season, winning the 2025 Kazakhstan Super Cup and making 7 appearances in the 2025–26 UEFA Champions League. He suffered an injury against Celtic on 20 August 2025.

=== Aktobe ===
In January 2026, Zarutsky signed for FC Aktobe following the expiration of his contract with Kairat. He was officially presented as an Aktobe player ahead of the 2026 season. He made his debut for Aktobe during the 3–0 friendly loss against Czech First League club Banik Ostrava on 18 January 2026.

== International career ==
Born in Russia, Zarutsky represented Kazakhstan U21 in 2014 (2 caps). He made his senior debut on 11 June 2024 in a 3–2 friendly loss against Azerbaijan and earned two more caps in March 2025 against Curaçao and Wales.

== Personal life ==
His father Alexander Zarutsky was also a footballer.

== Career statistics ==
=== Club ===
As of match played 4 April 2026

Appearances and goals by club, season and competition
| Club | Season | League | | | Kazakhstan Cup | | Europe | | Kazakhstan Super Cup | | Total | |
| Club | Season | Division | Apps | Goals | Apps | Goals | Apps | Goals | Apps | Goals | Apps | Goals |
|---|---|---|---|---|---|---|---|---|---|---|---|---|
| Shakhter Karagandy | 2013 | Kazakhstan Premier League | 1 | 0 | 0 | 0 | 0 | 0 | – | | 1 | 0 |
| Shakhter Karagandy | 2014 | Kazakhstan Premier League | 0 | 0 | 0 | 0 | 0 | 0 | – | | 0 | 0 |
| Shakhter Karagandy | 2015 | Kazakhstan Premier League | 9 | 0 | 0 | 0 | – | | – | | 9 | 0 |
| Kyzylzhar | 2017 | Kazakhstan First League | 2 | 0 | 1 | 0 | – | | – | | 3 | 0 |
| Kubanskaya Korona Shevchenko | 2017–18 | Unknown | ? | 0 | – | | – | | – | | ? | 0 |
| Kubanskaya Korona Shevchenko | 2018–19 | Unknown | ? | 0 | – | | – | | – | | ? | 0 |
| Kubanskaya Korona Shevchenko | Total | | 12+ | 0 | 1+ | 0 | 0 | 0 | – | | 13+ | 0 |
| Irtysh Pavlodar | 2019 | Kazakhstan Premier League | 7 | 0 | 0 | 0 | – | | – | | 7 | 0 |
| Irtysh Pavlodar | 2020 | Kazakhstan Premier League | 0 | 0 | – | | – | | – | | 0 | 0 |
| Irtysh M (loan) | 2019 | Kazakhstan Second League | 1 | 0 | – | | – | | – | | 1 | 0 |
| Kaisar | 2020 | Kazakhstan Premier League | 17 | 0 | – | | 1 (Note: Appearances in UEFA Europa League) | 0 | – | | 18 | 0 |
| Astana | 2021 | Kazakhstan Premier League | 7 | 0 | 7 | 0 | 1 (Note: Appearances in UEFA Conference League) | 0 | 1 | 0 | 16 | 0 |
| Astana | 2022 | Kazakhstan Premier League | 11 | 0 | 3 | 0 | 1 | 0 | 1 | 0 | 16 | 0 |
| Astana | 2023 | Kazakhstan Premier League | 7 | 0 | 4 | 0 | 0 | 0 | 1 | 0 | 12 | 0 |
| Astana | 2024 | Kazakhstan Premier League | 8 | 0 | 0 | 0 | 1 | 0 | 1 | 0 | 10 | 0 |
| Astana | 2025 | Kazakhstan Premier League | 0 | 0 | – | | – | | – | | 0 | 0 |
| Astana-Zhastar (loan) | 2021 | Kazakhstan First League | 2 | 0 | – | | – | | – | | 2 | 0 |
| Astana-Zhastar (loan) | 2022 | Kazakhstan First League | 3 | 0 | – | | – | | – | | 3 | 0 |
| Kairat | 2025 | Kazakhstan Premier League | 15 | 0 | 2 | 0 | 7 (Note: Appearances in UEFA Champions League) | 0 | 1 | 0 | 27 | 0 |
| Aktobe | 2026 | Kazakhstan Premier League | 4 | 0 | 0 | 0 | – | | – | | 4 | 0 |
| Aktobe | Total | | 82 | 0 | 16 | 0 | 11 | 0 | 5 | 0 | 114 | 0 |
| Career total | | | 94+ | 0 | 17+ | 0 | 11 | 0 | 5 | 0 | 127+ | 0 |

=== International ===
As of match played 2 October 2026

Appearances and goals by national team and year
| National team | Year | Apps | Goals |
|---|---|---|---|
| Kazakhstan | 2024 | 1 | 0 |
| Kazakhstan | 2025 | 2 | 0 |
| Kazakhstan | 2026 | 2 | 0 |
| Total | | 5 | 0 |

== Honours ==
Kyzylzhar

- Kazakhstan First League runner-up: 2017

Astana

- Kazakhstan Premier League: 2022, runner-up: 2021, 2023, 2024
- Kazakhstan Super Cup: 2022, runner-up: 2021

Kairat

- Kazakhstan Premier League: 2025
- Kazakhstan Super Cup: 2025
