= QJ League =

Kazakhstan youth football league

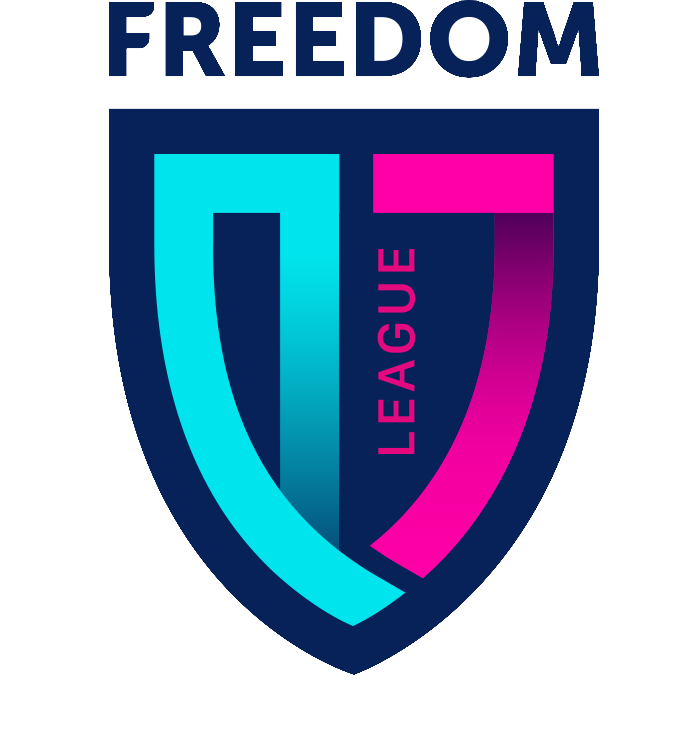
- Founded: 2023; 3 years ago
- Country: Kazakhstan
- Confederation: UEFA (Europe)
- Number of clubs: 12
- Level on pyramid: 1
- International cup: UEFA Youth League
- Current champions: Kairat (3rd title) (2025)
- Most championships: Kairat (3rd title)
- Broadcaster(s): Qazsport, QSport
- Website: qjl.kz
- Current: 2025 QJ League

The QJ League (Kazakh: Футболдан Қазақстан жасөспірімдер лигасы, Futboldan Qazaqstan jasöspırımder ligasy) — Kazakhstan Youth Football League, in which youth teams of professional football clubs in Kazakhstan take part. The official name according to the regulations from the 2023 season is Freedom QJ League. One of the ways to decipher the name — Qazaqstan Junior League.

== History ==
Founded in 2023. In February of that year, at a meeting of the executive committee of the KFF, QJ League was granted exclusive organizational and commercial rights to conduct part of the youth competitions in the senior age categories. Under a memorandum signed with the KFF, the project's генеральным партнером (general partner) is Freedom Holding. The QJ League Board of Trustees is chaired by Kazakhstani entrepreneur and financier Timur Turlov, while the league president is well-known Kazakhstani and Russian football official Rokhus Shokh. The project received approval and support from the President of the KFF, Adilet Barmenkulov. During his working visit to Kazakhstan on May 3, 2023, FIFA President Gianni Infantino meet with the league project, expressed full support, and wished it successful development.

In 2024, the league expanded with the launch of competitions for boys under 17. In addition to Division A, which mirrors the U-18 tournament in structure, Division B was also established. As a result, eight new cities joined QJ League.

In total, in 2025, 1,620 players from 54 teams representing 18 cities of Kazakhstan participated in Freedom QJ League tournaments. A total of 542 matches were played — significantly more than in the two previous seasons combined.

== Format and features ==
The League features youth teams of professional football clubs of Kazakhstan in the U-18, U-17, and U-16 age categories, as well as girls’ teams in the U-17 category.

The season is played in a spring–autumn format, starting in April and ending in October. Participating teams compete in a double round-robin tournament on a weekly cycle, with a break in June to accommodate school graduation exams.

The winner of the U-18 Division A tournament earns the right to represent Kazakhstan in the UEFA Youth League. A key feature of QJ League is that all expenses related to logistics, accommodation and meals for away matches, refereeing and match inspection services, the organization of live broadcasts with 6–12 cameras, as well as other marketing budget items, are fully covered by the league itself.

During its first three years, the project — designed to serve as a bridge between youth and professional football — directly involved around 3,000 players and specialists.

The League places particular emphasis on digitalization and the use of advanced analytical data. Following its establishment, youth academies participating in the tournament gained access, for the first time in the history of Kazakhstan's youth football, to the Wyscout sports analytics platform.

In 2024, QJ League introduced its own digital platform for coaches — FF Manager. Its functionality allows coaches to plan training sessions using a convenient and multifunctional builder, as well as access an extensive methodological database available in three languages: Kazakh, Russian, and English.

The system has received professional recognition, winning multiple awards at international competitions such as the Tagline Awards, MARSPO Awards, and Workspace Digital Awards.

Notes

- Italics identifies either defunct or teams that lost professional status.
