= FC Kairat-Zhastar =

- Full name: Football Club Kairat-Zhastar; Қайрат-Жастар футбол клубы
- Founded: 2010
- Ground: Almaty Central Stadium
- Capacity: 23,804
- Manager: Kirill Morunov
- League: Kazakhstan First Division
- 2022: 4th

FC Kairat-Zhastar (Kazakh: Қайрат-Жастар футбол клубы) is a Kazakhstani football club based in Almaty.

== History ==
The club was formed as FC Tsesna in 2010 to play in First Division. In December 2011, it was acquired by FC Kairat due to having one of the best football academies in Kazakhstan. They started season 2012 with its current name. FC Kairat-Zhastar is also the feeder team for FC Kairat, as the English translation in Kazakh for "zhastar" is youth.

== Name history ==
- 2010 : Founded as Tsesna
- 2012 : Renamed Kairat-Akademiya
- 2019 : Renamed Kairat-Zhastar
