= Vyacheslav =

Vyacheslav, also transliterated Viacheslav or Viatcheslav (Russian: Вячеслав, pronounced [vʲɪtɕɪˈslaf]; Ukrainian: В'ячеслав, pronounced [wjɐtʃeˈslɑu̯]), is a Russian and Ukrainian masculine given name. It is the equivalent of Belarusian Вячаслаў/Вацлаў (transliterated Viačaslaŭ/Vaclaŭ, or Viachaslau/Vaclau), Croatian Vjenceslav, Czech Václav, Polish Wacław and Więcesław — Latinised as Wenceslaus. Also: Romanian of Moldova Veaceslav.

It is a Slavic dithematic name (that is, composed of two lexemes) derived from the Slavic words vyache, "great(er)", and slava, "glory, fame". Common short forms are Slava, Slavik.

Feminine forms: Vyacheslava, Więcesława.

Notable people with the name include Russian poet Vyacheslav Ivanov, actor Vyacheslav Tikhonov, and fashion designer Slava Zaitsev.

== Notable people ==
Notable people with the given name Vyacheslav, Viacheslav or Viatcheslav include:

=== Academia ===
- Viacheslav Belavkin (1946–2012), professor in applied mathematics at the University of Nottingham
- Vyacheslav Ivanov (1929-2017), Russian philologist and scholar specialising in Indo-European studies
- Vyacheslav Ivanovich Lebedev (1930–2010), Soviet and Russian mathematician, known for his work on numerical analysis and development of the Lebedev quadrature
- Vyacheslav Lypynsky (1882–1931), Ukrainian historian, social and political activist who founded the Ukrainian Democratic-Agrarian Party
- Viatcheslav Mukhanov (born 1956), Soviet/Russian theoretical physicist and cosmologist
- Vyacheslav Nikonov (born 1956), Russian political scientist and the grandson of Vyacheslav Molotov, for whom he is named
- Vyacheslav Shokurov (born 1950, Russian mathematician best known for his research in algebraic geometry and now a full Professor at Johns Hopkins University
- Vyacheslav Stepin (1934–2018), Russian philosopher
- Viacheslav V. Nikulin (fl. since 1999), Russian mathematician

=== Arts, entertainment and literature ===
- Vyacheslav Akhunov (born 1948), Kyrgyz-born Uzbek visual artist, and author
- Vyacheslav Ivanov (1866–1949), Russian symbolist poet and philosopher
- Vyacheslav Kotyonochkin, director of the 1988 Soviet animated film The Kitten from the Lizyukov street
- Vyacheslav Klykov (1939–2006), Russian sculptor who specialized in public monuments to key figures of national history and culture
- Vyacheslav Kryklyvyy, known as Slavik Kryklyvyy, Ukrainian-born ballroom dancer specialising in International Latin
- Viatcheslav Nazarov (1952–1996), world-class jazz trombonist, pianist, and vocalist
- Vyacheslav Nevinny (1934–2009), Russian actor who worked in the Moscow Art Theatre (1959–2003) and was titled a People's Artist of the USSR in 1986
- Vyacheslav Ivanovich Polunin (born 1950), better known as Slava Polunin, Russian performance artist and clown
- Vyacheslav Rybakov (born 1954), Soviet and Russian science fiction author
- Viacheslav Samodurov (born 1974), Principal Dancer at the Royal Ballet, Covent Garden in London
- Vyacheslav Shalygin (born 1968), Russian science fiction writer who completed medical school (1993) after reaching the rank of starshina in the Soviet Army
- Vyacheslav Spesivtsev (born 1943), Russian and Soviet actor and director of the Taganka Theatre Studio in Moscow from 1966
- Vyacheslav Tikhonov (1928–2009), Soviet and Russian actor best known for his role as Soviet spy Stierlitz in the television series Seventeen Moments of Spring
- Vyacheslav Mikhailovich Zaitsev (1938–2023), more commonly known as Slava Zaitsev, Russian fashion designer, painter, graphic artist and theatrical costume designer

=== Diplomats ===
- Vyacheslav Dolgov (born 1937), Soviet and Russian diplomat who has served as Ambassador to Australia (1990–1994), Kazakhstan (1994–1997), Belarus (1999–2002), and Slovenia (2002–2004), and since 2005, he has been lecturing in consular law
- Vyacheslav Kovalenko (born 1946), Russian diplomat who is presently the Ambassador Extraordinary and Plenipotentiary to the Republic of Armenia
- Vyacheslav Trubnikov (born 1944), Russian journalist, political scientist, spy and diplomat who served as Director of the Russian Foreign Intelligence Service (1996–2000) and was appointed Ambassador to India in 2004

=== Military ===
- Vyacheslav Alexandrovich Alexandrov (1968–1988), Russian-born Soviet Guards Junior Sergeant and squad commander who was killed in Afghanistan and posthumously awarded the title of Hero of the Soviet Union
- Vyacheslav Borisov (born 1955), Russian general who commanded troops in the Russo-Georgian War
- Vyacheslav Kevorkov, KGB major general who in 2010 published a book about journalist and agent provocateur Victor Louis (1928–1992)
- Vyacheslav Ivanovich Zof (1889–1937), Ukrainian-born Soviet Commissar and Chief of Naval Forces of the USSR (1924–1936)
- Vyacheslav Zudov (born 1942), Russian-born Soviet cosmonaut who spent 2 days in space in 1976 as Commander on Soyuz 23

=== Music ===
- Vyacheslav Artyomov (or Artemov) (born 1940), Russian and Soviet composer
- Vyacheslav Bodolika (born 1977), Moldavan musician and member of Russian musical group Premyer-Ministr
- Vyacheslav Butusov (born 1961), lead singer of Russian rock group Nautilus Pompilius, who started his own career as a singer after its disbandment
- Viacheslav Dinerchtein (born 1976), violist and promoter of novel and overlooked viola repertoire
- Vyacheslav Dobrynin (born 1946), Russian composer and singer also known as Doctor Shlyager
- Vyacheslav Ganelin (born 1944), Lithuanian Jewish jazz musician and composer
- Vyacheslav Kruglik, Russian composer and conductor
- Vyacheslav Kuznetsov (composer) (born 1955), Austrian-born Belarusian classical music composer
- Vyacheslav Mescherin (1923–1995), Soviet musician noted for producing music with synthesisers and his long-time directorship of the Moscow Orchestra of Electromusical Instruments
- Vyacheslav Nagovitsin (born 1939), Russian composer and former student of Dmitri Shostakovich
- Vyacheslav Ovchinnikov (1936–2019), Soviet and Russian composer
- Vyacheslav Suk (also known as Václav Suk) (1861–1933), Czech-born Russian violinist, conductor and composer
- Vyacheslav Bodolika (born 1977), Moldavan musician and member of Russian musical group Premyer-Ministr
- Vyacheslav Polozov (born 1950), is an operatic spinto tenor from the former Ukrainian SSR.

=== Politics ===
- Vyacheslav Bitarov (born 1961), Russian politician, Head of the Republic of North Ossetia-Alania and Chairman of the Government of the Republic of North Ossetia-Alania, one of the commanders during Insurgency in the North Caucasus
- Vyacheslav Chornovil (1937–1999), Ukrainian politician and prominent dissident to Soviet policies who paved the path for Ukraine's independence
- Vyacheslav Dudka (born 1960), Governor of the Russian Oblast of Tula (2005–2011)
- Vyacheslav Gayzer (born 1966), Russian politician who is currently serving as President of the Komi Republic (since 2010)
- Vyacheslav Jordan (born 1966), Moldovan politician who served as interim general mayor of Chisinau (January to June, 2007)
- Vyacheslav Kebich (1936–2020), Belarusian political figure who served as the first Prime Minister of the Republic of Belarus (1991–1994)
- Vyacheslav Kislitsyn (born 1948), Russian politician who served as President of Mari El (1997–2001)
- Vyacheslav Nikolayevich Kuznetsov (born 1947), Belarusian politician who served as Acting Chairman of the Supreme Soviet in 1994
- Vyacheslav Lypynsky (1882–1931), Ukrainian historian, social and political activist who founded the Ukrainian Democratic-Agrarian Party
- Vyacheslav Malyshev, Soviet politician for whom the Malyshev Factory in Ukraine is named
- Vyacheslav Menzhinsky (1874–1934), Polish-Russian revolutionary, Soviet statesman and Party official
- Vyacheslav Molotov (1890–1986), birth name Vyacheslav Mikhailovich Skryabin, Soviet politician and diplomat for whom the Molotov cocktail was derisively named
- Vyacheslav Nagovitsyn (born 1956), President of the Republic of Buryatia (since 2007), a federal subject of Russia
- Vyacheslav von Plehve (1846–1904), director of police in Tsarist Russia and later Minister of the Interior (1902–1904)
- Vyacheslav Pozgalyov (born 1946), appointed governor of Vologda Oblast in Russia in 1996
- Vyacheslav Prokopovych (1881–1942), Ukrainian politician and historian
- Vyacheslav Mikhailovich Skryabin, birth name of Vyacheslav Molotov
- Vyacheslav Shtyrov (born 1953), Russian politician who was President of the Sakha Republic (2002–2010), a federal subject of Russia
- Vyacheslav Shverikas (1961–2021), Russian politician, member of the Federation Council (2004–2017)
- Viacheslav Suprunenko (born 1976), deputy of the Kyiv City Council, member of the committee on the budget and the socio-economic development
- Viacheslav Tsugba (born 1944), third Prime Minister of the Republic of Abkhazia

=== Royalty ===
- Viacheslav I of Kiev (1083–1154), Prince of Smolensk, Turov, Pereyaslavl, Peresopnitsa, Vyshgorod, and Grand Prince of Kiev
- Grand Duke Vyacheslav Constantinovich of Russia (1862–1879), Romanov grand duke and youngest son of Grand Duke Constantine Nicholaevich and Grand Duchess Alexandra Iosifovna
- Vyacheslav Vladimirovich, Prince of Pereyaslavl (1132–1134, 1142)

=== Sports ===
==== Association football (soccer) ====
- Viacheslav Aliabiev (1934–2009), Ukrainian professional footballer
- Vyacheslav Ambartsumyan (1940–2008), Russian football player (senior career 1959–1972) and coach (1973–1987) who played 2 matches for the USSR national team
- Vyacheslav Amin (born 1976), Kyrgyzstani football player (senior career from 1994) and member of the Kyrgyzstan national football team (from 2000)
- Vyacheslav Andreyuk (1945–2010), Russian-born Soviet football player (senior career 1963–1969) who twice played for the USSR national team
- Vyacheslav Bazylevych (born 1990), Ukrainian football player (senior career since 2007)
- Vyacheslav Chadov (born 1986), Russian football player (senior career since 2005)
- Vyacheslav Chanov (born 1951), Russian football player (senior career 1969–1993) and current coach
- Vyacheslav Checher (born 1980), Ukrainian football player (senior career since 2000) who is a member of the Ukraine national team (since 2004)
- Vyacheslav Danilin (born 1984), Russian football player (senior career since 2002)
- Vyacheslav Dayev (born 1972), Russian football player (senior career 1991–2004) who was a member of the Russian national team at the 2002 FIFA World Cup
- Vyacheslav Dmitriyenko (born 1977), Russian football player (senior career since 1996)
- Vyacheslav Dmitriyev (born 1990), Russian football player (senior career since 2006)
- Vyacheslav Geraschenko (born 1972), Belarusian football player (senior career 1990–2005), member of the Belarus national team (1997–2004), and coach (since 2006)
- Vyacheslav Hleb (born 1983), Belarusian football player (senior career from 2000)
- Vyacheslav Horbanenko (born 1984), Ukrainian football player (senior career from 2003)
- Vyacheslav Hrozny (born 1956), Ukrainian soccer coach (since 1987)
- Vyacheslav Ivanov (born 1987), Ukrainian football player (senior career from 2004)
- Vyacheslav Kalashnikov (born 1985), Russian football player (senior career from 2002)
- Vyacheslav Kamoltsev (born 1971), Russian football player (senior career 1988–2006)
- Vyacheslav Kartashov (born 1966), Russian football player (senior career 1990–2000)
- Vyacheslav Kernozenko (born 1976), Cuba-born Ukrainian football player (senior career 1993–2009) who was also a member of the Ukraine national team (2000–2008)
- Vyacheslav Kirillov (born 1989), Russian football player (senior career from 2005)
- Vyacheslav Komarov (born 1950), Russian football player (senior career 1973–1976) and coach (1997–2004)
- Vyacheslav Kovneristov (born 1973), Russian football player (senior career 1993–2009)
- Vyacheslav Krendelyov (born 1982), Turkmenistani football player (senior career from 2000) and member of the Turkmenistan national team (from 2004)
- Vyacheslav Krykanov (born 1971), Russian football player (senior career 1989–2006) and coach (since 2009)
- Vyacheslav Kuznetsov (footballer) (born 1962), Russian football player (senior career 1979–1997) and coach (since 2003)
- Vyacheslav Leshchuk (born 1951), Ukrainian and Soviet football player (senior career 1969–1983) and coach (1983–1995)
- Vyacheslav Lugovkin (born 1968), Russian football player (senior career 1988–2003) and coach (2001–2008)
- Vyacheslav Lunyov (born 1940), Soviet football goalkeeper
- Vyacheslav Lychkin (born 1973), Azerbaijani football player (senior career 1989–2008) who was a member of the Azerbaijan national team (1995–2001)
- Vyacheslav Malafeev (born 1979), Russian football player (senior career from 1997) and member of the Russia national football team (from 2003)
- Vyacheslav Malakeev (born 1973), Russian-born Finnish football player (senior career since 1991)
- Vyacheslav Marushko (1938–1999), Russian-born Soviet football player (senior career 1957–1968), and coach (1971–1989)
- Vyacheslav Melnikov (footballer, born 1954), Russian football player (senior career 1975–1986) and coach (1991–2008)
- Vyacheslav Melnikov (footballer, born 1975), Russian football player (senior career 1991–2007)
- Vyacheslav Nurmagombetov (born 1984), Russian football player (senior career from 2001) who holds Kazakhstan citizenship
- Vyacheslav Nikolayevich Petrukhin (born 1953), Russian football player (senior career 1971–1989) and coach (since 2004)
- Vyacheslav Ponomarev (born 1978), Uzbek football player who made one appearance for the Uzbekistan national team in 2000
- Vyacheslav Protsenko (born 1974), Ukrainian football player (senior career since 1992)
- Vyacheslav Rafikov (born 1986), Russian football player (senior career since 2004)
- Vyacheslav Rodin (born 1981), Russian football player (senior career since 1999)
- Vyacheslav Semyonov (born 1947), Ukrainian football player (senior career 1966–1978)
- Viacheslav Senchenko (born 1977), professional boxer from Ukraine
- Vyacheslav Serdyuk (born 1985), Ukrainian football player (senior career since 2005)
- Vyacheslav Shevchenko (born 1985), Ukrainian football player (senior career since 2001)
- Vyacheslav Shevchuk (born 1979), Ukrainian football player (senior career from 1996) who has made 16 appearances for the Ukraine national team
- Vyacheslav Sobolev (born 1984), Kazakhstani football player (senior career from 2005)
- Vyacheslav Solovyov (1925–1996), Russian-born Soviet football player (1946–1954) and coach (1954–1991)
- Vyacheslav Sukristov (born 1961), Lithuanian football player (senior career 1984–1998) and manager (since 2005)
- Vyacheslav Sviderskyi (born 1979), Ukrainian football player (senior career 1997–2009) who played in Ukraine's 2006 World Cup Squad
- Vyacheslav Tsaryov (1971–2010), Russian football player (senior career 1988–2002)
- Vyacheslav Verushkin (born 1989), Russian football player (senior career since 2007)
- Vyacheslav Volkov (born 1970), Russian football player (1991–2006) and coach (since 2008)
- Vyacheslav Zapoyaska (born 1980), Ukrainian football player (senior career since 2000)
- Vyacheslav Zemlyanskiy (born 1986), Russian football player (senior career since 2005)

==== Athletics ====
- Vyacheslav Ivanenko (born 1961), Russian Olympic Gold Medallist (representing the USSR) in the 50 km race walk event
- Vyacheslav Lykho (born 1967), Russian Olympic shot putter who represented the USSR, the Unified Team, and later Russia
- Vyacheslav Muravyev (born 1982), Kazakhstani Olympic sprinter who specializes in the 100 and 200 metres events
- Vyacheslav Shabunin (born 1969), Russian middle distance runner who specializes in the 1500 metres
- Vyacheslav Voronin (born 1974), Russian Olympic athlete who won World (1999) and European Indoor (2000) championships in high jump

==== Boxing ====
- Vyacheslav Glazkov (born 1984), Ukrainian super heavyweight division boxer and Olympic Bronze Medallist
- Vyacheslav Lemeshev (1952–1996), Russian middleweight boxer and Olympic Gold Medallist representing the USSR
- Vyacheslav Senchenko (born 1977), Ukrainian boxer who won the WBA welterweight title on April 10, 2009
- Vyacheslav Uzelkov 1979–2024), Ukrainian middleweight boxer.
- Vyacheslav Yanovskiy (born 1957), Belarusian light welterweight boxer and Olympic Gold Medallist for the USSR

==== Canoeing ====
- Vyacheslav Ionov (born 1940), Soviet sprint canoer who won an Olympic gold medal in the K-4 1000 m event
- Vyacheslav Kononov, Soviet sprint canoer who won two World Championship gold medals in the K-2 10000 m event
- Vyacheslav Kutuzin (born 1973), Soviet Olympic sprint canoer who competed in the K-4 1000 m event
- Vyacheslav Tsekhosh, Ukrainian sprint canoer who won a World Championship silver medal in the C-1 4 × 200 m relay event in 2010
- Vyacheslav Vinnik, Soviet sprint canoer who won World Championship medals Championships in the K-1 4 × 500 m and K-4 1000 m events in 1963
- Vyacheslav Yonov, Soviet sprint canoer who won a World Championship gold medal in the K-4 10 000 m event in 1966

==== Ice hockey ====
- Vyacheslav Anisin (born 1951), Russian ice hockey player who played in the Soviet Hockey League and is the father Winter Olympic ice dancing champion Marina Anissina
- Viatcheslav Botchkarev (born 1968), former Soviet sport shooter
- Vyacheslav Bulanov (born 1970), Russian ice hockey referee, who has officiated at both Winter Olympics and World Hockey Championship matches
- Vyacheslav Buravchikov (born 1987), Russian ice hockey player (since 2004)
- Vyacheslav Butsayev (born 1970), Russian professional ice hockey player (1987–2007) and Winter Olympics Gold Medalist
- Vyacheslav Bykov (born 1960), Soviet and Russian ice hockey player (1979–2000), dual Winter Olympics Gold Medalist, and present head coach of the Russian national ice hockey team
- Vyacheslav Chistyakov, Russian ice hockey player
- Vyacheslav Fetisov (born 1958), Russian ice hockey player (1977–1998) and dual Winter Olympics Gold Medalist who was the inaugural Chairman of the WADA Athlete Committee
- Vyacheslav Kozlov (born 1972), Russian ice hockey player (since 1987) and two-time Stanley Cup champion (1997, 1998) with the Detroit Red Wings
- Vyacheslav Kulemin, Russian ice hockey player
- Viacheslav Lavrov (1958–2000), retired professional ice hockey player who played in the Soviet Hockey League
- Vyacheslav Litovchenko, Russian ice hockey player
- Viacheslav Solodukhin (1950–1980), retired professional ice hockey player who played in the Soviet Hockey League
- Vyacheslav Starshinov (born 1940), Russian ice hockey player who played in the Soviet Hockey League and has been inducted into the International Ice Hockey Federation Hall of Fame
- Vyacheslav Voynov (born 1990), Russian ice hockey player

==== Other sports ====
- Vyacheslav Atavin (born 1967), Soviet and Russian handball player who has won gold medals at European and World Championships and at the Olympic Games
- Vyacheslav Chukanov (born 1952), Olympic Gold Medalist in show jumping with the Soviet Union
- Viacheslav Datsik (born 1980), Russian former kickboxer and mixed martial artist
- Vyacheslav Denisov (born 1983), Uzbek basketball player who is a member of the Uzbekistan national team and made his debut at the 2009 FIBA Asia Championships
- Viatcheslav Djavanian (born 1969), former Russian cyclist
- Vyacheslav Domani (born 1947), Russian Olympic volleyball player who won a bronze medal competing for the Soviet Union
- Vyacheslav Dryagin (born 1940), Russian Winter Olympic skier and World Championships bronze medalist who competed for the Soviet Union
- Vyacheslav Dubinin, runner up in the Individual Ice Racing World Championship in 1966 and 1967
- Viacheslav Dydyshko (born 1949), Belarusian chess Grandmaster (1995)
- Vyacheslav Ekimov (born 1966), Russian gold medal-winning Olympic road and track cyclist who was named Russian Cyclist of the Century in 2001
- Vyacheslav Gorpishin (born 1970), Russian Olympic Gold Medalist in handball
- Viacheslav Grachev (born 1973), Russian rugby union player
- Vyacheslav Ivanov (born 1938), Russian rower who was the first three-time Olympic gold medalist in the single scull event
- Viacheslav Ivanovski (born 1975), Israeli Olympic weightlifter
- Vyacheslav Koloskov (born 1941), Russian and Soviet sport functionary who served as vice-president of FIFA (1980–1996)
- Vyacheslav Kravtsov (born 1987), Ukrainian basketball player (professional career since 2005)
- Vyacheslav Kurennoy (1932–1992), Russian Olympic water polo player who competed for the Soviet Union
- Viacheslav Lampeev (1952–2003), former field hockey player from Tajikistan
- Vyacheslav Nikulin, represented Russia and later Germany at the Individual Ice Racing World Championship, runner up in 2002 and third place (1994, 1995, 1996, 1998, 1999, and 2001)
- Vyacheslav Oleynyk (born 1966), Ukrainian wrestler and Olympic Gold Medalist
- Vyacheslav Pimenov (born 1991), Russian triathlete, supersprint junior champion and the Olympic Distance junior silver medalist in 2010
- Viacheslav Platonov (1939–2005), Russian volleyball player and coach
- Viacheslav Ragozin (1908–1962), Soviet chess Grandmaster, an International Arbiter of chess, and World Correspondence Chess Champion
- Vyacheslav Savlev, Soviet bobsledder who finished runner-up in the two-man event for the 1985–86 World Cup season
- Vyacheslav Shyrshov (born 1979), Ukrainian Olympic swimmer who won a gold medal at the 2001 European Championships
- Vyacheslav Vasilevsky, Russian mixed martial arts fighter
- Vyacheslav Vedenin (born 1941), Russian-born Soviet Olympic and World Championships Gold Medalist in cross country skiing
- Viacheslav Zagorodniuk (born 1972), former Ukrainian figure skater
- Vyacheslav Zahorodnyuk (born 1972), four-time Ukraine national figure skating champion
- Vyacheslav Zaytsev (born 1952), Russian volleyball player who won Olympic gold and silver medals for the Soviet Union

=== Other people ===
- Vyacheslav Ivankov (1940–2009), assassinated member of the Russian Mafia
- Vyacheslav Oltarzhevsky (1880–1966), Russian architect and one of the first Soviet experts in skyscraper construction
- Vyacheslav Ivanovich Silin (1907–1975), Russian gunsmith known for his development of the Silin gun
- Vyacheslav Mikhaylovich Tichonitsky (1873–1959), Metropolitan Bishop of the Russian Orthodox Church in Western Europe
- Viatcheslav Moshe Kantor (born 1953), international public figure, Jewish leader, businessman, peace activist and philanthropist

=== Fictional characters ===
- Vyacheslav Grinko, fictional ex-Spetznaz mercenary in Tom Clancy's Splinter Cell

== See also ==
- Wenceslaus (disambiguation)
