= Chistyakov =

Chistyakov (Russian: Чистяков) is a Russian masculine surname originating from the word chistyi, meaning clean. Its feminine counterpart is Chistyakova. Notable people with the surname include:

- Aleksandr Chistyakov (disambiguation), multiple people
- Alexei Chistyakov (born 1968), Russian ice hockey coach and former player
- Anastasia Chistyakova (born 1997), Russian ice hockey player
- Andrei Chistyakov (disambiguation), multiple people
- Dmitri Chistyakov (born 1994), Russian football player
- Galina Chistyakova (born 1962), Soviet long jumper
- George Chistyakov, Russian orthodox priest and historian
- Ivan Chistyakov (1900–1979), Soviet general
- Konstantin Chistyakov (born 1970), Russian alpine skier
- Oleg Chistyakov (born 1976), Russian football coach and former player
- Pyotr Chistyakov (1792–1862), Russian explorer
- Maksim Chistyakov (born 1986), Russian football player
- Nikita Chistyakov (born 2000), Russian football player
- Pavel Chistyakov, Russian painter and art teacher
- Regina Chistyakova (born 1961), Lithuanian runner
- Sergei Chistyakov (born 1990), Russian ice hockey player and coach
- Valentin Chistyakov (born 1939), Russian hurdler
- Vyacheslav Chistyakov, Russian ice hockey forward
