= Rafikov =

Rafikov (Russian: Рафиков) is a masculine surname, its feminine counterpart is Rafikova. It may refer to

- Alimzhon Rafikov (born 1962), Tajikistani football player
- Mars Rafikov (1933–2000), Soviet cosmonaut
- Rushan Rafikov (born 1995), Russian ice hockey player
- Vyacheslav Rafikov (born 1986), Russian football player
