= 2000 Kazakhstan Cup final =

- Event: 2000 Kazakhstan Cup
Kairat	Access-Golden Grain
5	0
- Date: 6 July 2000
- Venue: Kazhimukan Munaitpasov Stadium, Astana
- Referee: Aleksandr Borisov (Semey)
- Attendance: 7,500

The 2000 Kazakhstan Cup final was the eighth final of the Kazakhstan Cup. The match was contested by Kairat and Access-Golden Grain at Kazhimukan Munaitpasov Stadium in Astana. The match was played on 6 July 2000 and was the final match of the competition.

== Background ==
Kairat played the third Kazakhstan Cup Final. In both finals they beat rivals (Fosfor, 1992 final, 5–1; Vostok-Adil, 1997 final, 2–0)

Access-Golden Grain played the first Kazakhstan Cup Final.

Kairat and Access-Golden Grain played twice during the season of league. Access-Golden Grain have won both matches with the score 2–0 of Kairat.

== Route to the Final ==
=== Kairat ===
Round	Opposition	Score
FR	Shakhter-Ispat-Karmet	2–0(0–0 (A) / 2–0 (H))
QF	Kaisar-Hurricane	4–2 (3–0 (H) / 2–1 (A))
SF	Vostok-Altyn	2–6 (2–2 (A) / 4–0 (H))
Key: (h) = Home venue; (a) = Away venue; (n) = Neutral venue.

=== Access-Golden Grain ===
Round	Opposition	Score
FR	Zhenis	0–1(0–0 (H) / 0–1 (A))
QF	Tobol	1–3 (0–1 (A) / 2–1 (H))
SF	Irtysh	3–6 (3–0 (A) / 6–0 (H))
Key: (h) = Home venue; (a) = Away venue; (n) = Neutral venue.

== Match ==
=== Details ===
6 July 2000

Kairat	5–0	Access-Golden Grain
Ivanov 11'; Litvinenko 20', 90'; Khamidullov 63' (pen.); Tarasov 69'	Report

Kazhimukan Munaitpasov Stadium, Astana
Attendance: 7500
Referee: Aleksandr Borisov (Semey)

GK	(Kazakhstan) Yevgeni Naboychenko
DF	(Kazakhstan) Sergei Pasko
DF	(Kazakhstan) Almas Kulshinbayev
DF	(Kazakhstan) Andrei Tetushkin
DF	(Kazakhstan) Yerlan Eleusinov
MF	(Kazakhstan) Roman Vorogovskiy
MF	(Kazakhstan) Yuri Bordolimov
MF	(Kazakhstan) Rafael Khamidullov	(yellow card) 12'	(substituted off) 79'
MF	(Kazakhstan) Sergei Ivanov		(substituted off) 67'
FW	(Kazakhstan) Oleg Litvinenko	(yellow card) 85'
FW	(Kazakhstan) Yevgeni Tarasov		(substituted off) 70'
Substitutes:
GK	(Kazakhstan) Nikolai Rodionov
DF	(Kazakhstan) Konstantin Gorovenko		(substituted on) 67'
DF	(Turkmenistan) Azat Kuldzhagazov		(substituted on) 70'
MF	(Kazakhstan) Andrei Travin		(substituted on) 79'
FW	(Kazakhstan) Yerlan Urazayev
FW	(Kazakhstan) Sergei Klimov
Manager:
(Kazakhstan) Vladimir Nikitenko

GK	(Russia) Vyacheslav Krykanov
DF	(Kazakhstan) Nurmat Mirzabayev		(substituted off) 46'
DF	(Russia) Dmitri Bystrov	(yellow card) 83'
DF	(Kazakhstan) Aleksandr Familtsev
DF	(Kazakhstan) Sergei Timofeev
MF	(Russia) Aleksei Zakharov	(yellow card) 81'
MF	(Russia) Aleksei Babenko		(red card) 72'
MF	(Kazakhstan) Ruslan Gumar		(substituted off) 46'
MF	(Kazakhstan) Igor Avdeev	(yellow card) 23'
MF	(Kazakhstan) Sergei Kalabukhin
FW	(Turkmenistan) Vladimir Bayramov		(substituted off) 58'
Substitutes:
GK	(Kazakhstan) Kirill Pryadkin
DF	(Kazakhstan) Andrei Kucheryavykh		(substituted on) 46'
MF	(Kazakhstan) Yuri Chukhleba		(substituted on) 46'
MF	(Turkmenistan) Muslim Agayew		(substituted on) 58'
MF	(Russia) Ildar Khuzhinov
FW	(Russia) Vyacheslav Koloda
FW	(Kazakhstan) Rustam Usmanov
Manager:
(Kazakhstan) Dmitri Ogay

Match officials

- Assistant referees:

Man of the match

Match rules

- 90 minutes.
- 30 minutes of extra-time if necessary.
- Penalty shoot-out if scores still level.
- Seven named substitutes.
- Maximum of three substitutions.
