= Yevstafy Pekhlevanidi =

Soviet-Greek footballer

Personal information
- Full name: Yevstafy Alkiviadovich Pekhlevanidi
- Date of birth: 29 October 1960 (age 66)
- Place of birth: Shymkent, Kazakh SSR, Soviet Union
- Height: 1.72 m (5 ft 7 1/2 in)
- Position: Striker

Senior career*
Years	Team	Apps	(Gls)
1979	Metallurg Chimkent	?	(29)
1980–1989	Kairat	273	(94)
1989	Meliorator Chimkent	8	(2)
1990–1991	Levadiakos	35	(15)
1992–1996	Fokikos		
- * Club domestic league appearances and goals

Yevstafy Alkiviadovich Pekhlevanidi (Russian: Евстафий Алкивиадович Пехлеваниди; Greek: Ευστάθιος Πεχλιβανίδης; born 29 October 1960) is a retired Soviet and Greek professional football player. He is of Caucasus Greek ethnic origin and immigrated from the Soviet Union to Greece in 1990.

His father Alkiviad Pekhlevanidi played for FC Dinamo Tbilisi in the 1940s.

== Honours ==
- USSR Federation Cup winner: 1988.
