= Aleksandr Chistyakov =

Aleksandr Chistyakov may refer to:

- Aleksandr Chistyakov (actor) (1880–1942), Russian actor
- Aleksandr Chistyakov (footballer, born 1980), Russian footballer with FC Baltika Kaliningrad, FC Zvezda Irkutsk and FC Nizhny Novgorod, among others
- Aleksandr Chistyakov (footballer, born 1988), Russian footballer with FC SKA-Energiya Khabarovsk and FC Smena Komsomolsk-na-Amure
