= Rendez-vous '87 =

Ice hockey exhibition series

	1	2	Total
NHL All-Stars	4	3	7
Soviet Union	3	5	8
- Location(s): Quebec City: Colisée de Québec
- Dates: February 8–11, 1987
- Hall of Famers: NHL All-Stars: Glenn Anderson (2008); Ray Bourque (2004); Chris Chelios (2013); Paul Coffey (2004; did not play); Grant Fuhr (2003); Michel Goulet (1998); Wayne Gretzky (1999); Dale Hawerchuk (2001); Mark Howe (2011; did not play); Jari Kurri (2001); Rod Langway (2002); Mario Lemieux (1997); Mark Messier (2007); Doug Wilson (2020); Soviet Union: Viacheslav Fetisov (2001); Igor Larionov (2008); Sergei Makarov (2016); Coaches: Bob Johnson (1992)
- Networks: CBC (Canada); SRC (French Canada); ESPN (United States)
- Announcers: Don Wittman and John Davidson (CBC); Rene Lecavalier, Charles Thiffault, and Guy Lafleur (SRC); Ken Wilson and Bill Clement (ESPN)

Game 1
	1	2	3	Total
U.S.S.R.	0	1	2	3
NHL All-Stars	1	1	2	4
- Date: February 11, 1987
- Attendance: 15,398

Game 2
	1	2	3	Total
U.S.S.R.	0	3	2	5
NHL All-Stars	1	0	2	3
- Date: February 13, 1987
- Attendance: 15,395

Rendez-vous '87 was a two-game international ice hockey series of games between the Soviet Union national ice hockey team and a team of All-Stars from the National Hockey League, held in Quebec City. It replaced the NHL's All-Star festivities for the 1986–87 NHL season. The Soviet team was paid $80,000 for their appearance in Rendez-vous '87, while the NHLers raised $350,000 for the players' pension fund.

Rendez-vous '87 was designed as a follow-up to the Challenge Cup series in 1979, hoping that the team of NHL All-Stars could beat the Soviet team, unlike before. To this end, the series was a two-game affair instead of a three-game affair in 1979. (4-2) (4-5) (0-6) The two-game series took place during five days of festivities starting on February 9, 1987 and finishing on February 13. The series was very successful, with some, including Wayne Gretzky, calling for more international hockey, especially between Canada and the Soviet Union, the two top powers of hockey at the time. The teams split the games, with the NHL winning the first game, 4–3, followed by a Soviet 5–3 victory two nights later, with the Russian players outscoring the NHL team 8–7 on aggregate.

== Television coverage ==
While the telecasts in Canada were on CBC as usual, they were not Hockey Night in Canada productions. The games were done as a CBC Sports production because Molson, which owned Hockey Night in Canada's rights at the time, was not allowed access to Le Colisée in Quebec City. Carling O'Keefe Breweries, owners of the Quebec Nordiques, assumed advertising rights for the telecasts, and the normal host(s) for Hockey Night in Canada in 1987, rookie Ron MacLean and Dave Hodge (before his late-season exit) were replaced by Brian Williams. Even the ice-blue blazers normally worn by Hockey Night in Canada commentators were replaced by the orange CBC sportcoats. Don Wittman and John Davidson called the action for CBC.

The games were shown in the United States on ESPN, with Ken Wilson and Bill Clement in the booth with both Tom Mees and John Saunders serving as hosts for the event.

== Uniforms ==
The NHL introduced unique All-Star uniforms to be worn for this series only. The overall design of the white jersey took its cues from the New Jersey Devils' red uniforms, with white replacing the Devils' red, orange replacing green, and black replacing white. The NHL shield was featured on the front, with two black stars to the left and right above the shield, and three additional black stars on each shoulder. The Rendez-vous '87 patch was worn on the right sleeve in lieu of the player number.

The Soviet team wore their standard red national team uniforms with white trim, with the Russian СССР on the front, and team captain Viacheslav Fetisov wearing a "К" for his captain's letter. The players' names on the back, however, were romanized.

== Lineups ==
	NHL All-Stars	U.S.S.R.
Head coach	(Canada) Jean Perron (Montreal Canadiens)	Viktor Tikhonov (CSKA Moscow)
Assistant Coach(es)	(Canada) Michel Bergeron (Quebec Nordiques) (United States) Bob Johnson (Calgary Flames)	Igor Dmitriev (Soviet Wings)
Lineup	(Canada) 1 – G Clint Malarchuk (Quebec Nordiques); (United States) 2 – D Mark Howe (Philadelphia Flyers, injured / did not play); (United States) 3 – D Mike Ramsey (Buffalo Sabres); (United States) 4 – D Rod Langway (Washington Capitals, Alternate); (Canada) 5 – D Rick Green (Montreal Canadiens); (Canada) 6 – D Ray Bourque (Boston Bruins, Alternate); (Canada) 7 – D Paul Coffey (Edmonton Oilers, injured / did not play); (Sweden) 8 – D Ulf Samuelsson (Hartford Whalers); (Canada) 9 – LW Glenn Anderson (Edmonton Oilers); (Canada) 10 – C Dale Hawerchuk (Winnipeg Jets); (Canada) 11 – C Mark Messier (Edmonton Oilers); (Canada) 14 – RW Kevin Dineen (Hartford Whalers); (Finland) 15 – LW Esa Tikkanen (Edmonton Oilers); (Canada) 16 – LW Michel Goulet (Quebec Nordiques); (Finland) 17 – RW Jari Kurri (Edmonton Oilers); (Canada) 19 – LW Kirk Muller (New Jersey Devils); (Canada) 20 – C Dave Poulin (Philadelphia Flyers); (Canada) 21 – D Normand Rochefort (Quebec Nordiques, game two only); (Canada) 24 – D Doug Wilson (Chicago Blackhawks); (United States) 25 – D Chris Chelios (Montreal Canadiens); (Sweden) 28 – RW Tomas Sandstrom (New York Rangers, game one only); (Canada) 31 – G Grant Fuhr (Edmonton Oilers); (Canada) 32 – RW Claude Lemieux (Montreal Canadiens); (Canada) 66 – C Mario Lemieux (Pittsburgh Penguins); (Canada) 99 – C Wayne Gretzky (Edmonton Oilers, Captain)	1 – G Sergei Mylnikov (Traktor Chelyabinsk); 2 – D Viacheslav Fetisov (CSKA Moscow, Captain); 4 – D Igor Stelnov (CSKA Moscow); 5 – D Vasily Pervukhin (Dynamo Moscow); 6 – D Mikhail Tatarinov (Dynamo Moscow); 7 – D Alexei Kasatonov (CSKA Moscow); 8 – D Alexei Gusarov (CSKA Moscow); 9 – RW Vladimir Krutov (CSKA Moscow); 10 – F Viacheslav Lavrov, (SKA Leningrad, game two only); 11 – C Igor Larionov (CSKA Moscow); 12 – D Sergei Starikov (CSKA Moscow); 13 – F Valeri Kamensky (CSKA Moscow); 14 – D Zinetula Bilyaletdinov (Dynamo Moscow); 15 – LW Andrei Khomutov (CSKA Moscow); 16 – RW Sergei Svetlov (Dynamo Moscow); 18 – C Alexander Semak (Dynamo Moscow); 19 – RW Mikhail Varnakov (Torpedo Gorky, game one only); 20 – G Evgeny Belosheikin (CSKA Moscow); 21 – C Sergei Nemchinov, (Soviet Wings, game two only); 22 – LW Sergei Priakhin (Soviet Wings); 24 – LW Sergei Makarov (CSKA Moscow); 27 – C Viacheslav Bykov (CSKA Moscow); 29 – LW Yuri Khmylev (Soviet Wings); 30 – C Anatoli Semenov (Dynamo Moscow, game one only)

== Game One – February 11, 1987 ==
NHL All-Stars won the game 4–3, thanks in part to the line of Wayne Gretzky, Jari Kurri and Esa Tikkanen. Dave Poulin scored the winning goal on a deflection from Mario Lemieux, but Lemieux was initially credited with the goal. On the bench, Lemieux could be seen pointing toward Poulin as the goal was announced.

	NHL All-Stars	U.S.S.R.
Final score	4	3
Scoring summary	Kurri (Gretzky, Tikkanen) 5:23 first; Anderson (M. Lemieux) 17:00 second; Dineen (Poulin, Hawerchuk) 7:03 third; Poulin (M. Lemieux, Wilson) 18:45 third (GWG)	Kasatonov (Makarov) 18:42 second; Bykov (Khomutov, Starikov) 2:03 third; Semenov (Tatarinov, Varnakov) 8:04 third
Penalties	C. Lemieux 10:30 first; Bourque 15:34 first; Hawerchuk 12:28 second; Tikkanen 8:18 third	bench (served by Kamensky) 14:37 second
Shots on Goal	11–9–7–27	5–9–10–24
Win/Loss	W – Grant Fuhr	L – Evgeny Belosheikin

- Referee: Sergei Morozov
- Linesmen: Ron Finn, Ray Scapinello

== Game Two – February 13, 1987 ==
The Soviets won the contest 5–3. This game featured the emergence of the young Soviet forward line consisting of Valeri Kamensky, Viacheslav Bykov, and Andrei Khomutov. After the game, the players on each team exchanged hockey sweaters as part of the hockey tradition.

	NHL All-Stars	U.S.S.R.
Final score	3	5
Scoring summary	Messier (Kurri, Gretzky) 3:32 first (PPG); Wilson (Gretzky, Goulet) 7:33 third (PPG); Bourque (Lemieux, Gretzky) 19:23 third	Kamensky (Khomutov, Bykov) 3:13 second; Krutov (Fetisov, Larionov) 5:41 second; Kamensky (unassisted) 19:41 second; Krutov (Larionov) 9:19 third (GWG); Khomutov (Kamensky) 12:59 third
Penalties	Anderson 9:50 first; C. Lemieux 11:33 first	Nemchinov 3:22 first; Krutov 9:50 first; Fetisov 17:04 first; Nemchinov 6:05 third; Kasatonov 11:46 third; Priakhin (minor and misconduct) 17:20 third
Shots on Goal	6–13–12–31	7–9–13–29
Win/Loss	L – Grant Fuhr	W – Evgeny Belosheikin

- Referee : Dave Newell
- Linesmen : Ron Finn, Ray Scapinello
- Series MVPs, NHL All-Stars Wayne Gretzky; Team USSR Valeri Kamensky
