= Andrei Chistyakov =

Andrei Chistyakov may refer to:

- Andrei Chistyakov (ice hockey) (born 1962), retired ice hockey player
- Andrei Chistyakov (conductor) (1949–2000), Russian conductor
