= Sergei Ledovskikh =

Russian footballer

Personal information
- Full name: Sergei Mikhailovich Ledovskikh
- Date of birth: 24 March 1958 (age 68)
- Place of birth: Tambov Oblast, Russian SFSR
- Height: 1.75 m (5 ft 9 in)
- Position: Midfielder

Youth career
- FC Shakhter Karagandy

Senior career*
Years	Team	Apps	(Gls)
1976–1980	FC Shakhter Karagandy	140	(8)
1980–1981	FC Kairat	14	(0)
1981–1982	FC Shakhter Karagandy	42	(2)
1982–1988	FC Kairat	204	(7)
1989–1990	FC Tsement Novorossiysk	78	(8)
1991–1993	FC Zhemchuzhina Sochi	93	(15)
1994	Sabah FA		
1994–1995	FC Zhemchuzhina Sochi	17	(1)
1995	Perlis FA	20	(4)

Managerial career
- 1996–1999: FC Zhemchuzhina Sochi (assistant)
- * Club domestic league appearances and goals

Sergei Mikhailovich Ledovskikh (Russian: Серге́й Михайлович Ледовских; born 24 March 1958) is a former Russian professional footballer.

== Club career ==
He made his professional debut in the Soviet Second League in 1980 for FC Shakhter Karagandy.

== Honours ==
- USSR Federation Cup winner: 1988.
