= Vyacheslav Nurmagombetov =

Russian-Kazakhstani footballer

Personal information
- Full name: Vyacheslav Serinbayevich Nurmagombetov
- Date of birth: 10 August 1984 (age 42)
- Height: 1.84 m (6 ft 1/2 in)
- Position: Midfielder

Senior career*
Years	Team	Apps	(Gls)
2001–2004	FC Amur Blagoveshchensk	61	(5)
2004	FC Zvezda Irkutsk	12	(2)
2005	FC Tobol	15	(1)
2005	FC Ayat Rudniy	4	(0)
2006	FC Tobol	14	(0)
2007	FC Kairat	12	(0)
2007	FC Tobol	2	(2)
2008	FC Zhetysu	13	(0)
2009–2012	FC Metallurg-Kuzbass Novokuznetsk	83	(4)
2012	FC Chita	17	(0)
2013–2014	FC Sibiryak Bratsk	29	(1)
- * Club domestic league appearances and goals

Vyacheslav Serinbayevich Nurmagombetov (Russian: Вячеслав Серинбаевич Нурмагомбетов; born 10 August 1984) is a former Russian professional football player. He also holds Kazakhstani citizenship.

== Club career ==
He played 4 seasons in the Kazakhstan Premier League.
