= European Railways Cup =

Football club tournament (1947–2003)

- Sport: Football
- Founded: 1947
- Folded: 2003
- No. of teams: Various
- Last champions: (Bulgaria) Lokomotiv Mezdra (1 title)
- Most titles: (Soviet Union) Lokomotiv Moscow (5 titles)

European Railways Cup or European Railworks Cup or International Sports Railway Workers Union Cup or Cup of the European Sport Union of Railway Workers is a defunct friendly football club tournament.

== Winners ==
National team tournament

#	Years	City	Winners	Score	Runners-up
1	1947	Budapest	Yugoslavia	2 – 1	Hungary
2	1951	Brussel	Yugoslavia	7 – 0	France
3	1955	Weiden	Austria	3 – 2	Germany
4	1958	Brussel	Yugoslavia	2 – 2 ^{1}	Germany

Club tournament

#	Years	City	Winners	Score	Runners-up
5	1961	Sofia	(Bulgaria) Lokomotiv Sofia	1 – 0	(Romania) Rapid București
6	1963	Moscow & Sofia	(Bulgaria) Lokomotiv Sofia	3 – 0; 0 – 1	(Soviet Union) Lokomotiv Moscow
7	1968	Sofia	(Romania) Rapid București	3 – 1; 0 – 1	(Bulgaria) Lokomotiv Sofia
8	1971	in various countries	(Soviet Union) Kairat Almaty ^{2}	1 – 1; 1 – 0	(Romania) Rapid București
9	1974	in various countries	(Soviet Union) Lokomotiv Moscow	1 – 4; 3 – 0	(Bulgaria) Lokomotiv Sofia
10	1976	Kosice	(Soviet Union) Lokomotiv Moscow	5 – 1	(Czechoslovakia) Lokomotíva Košice
11	1979	Regensburg	(Soviet Union) Lokomotiv Moscow	1 – 0	(Czechoslovakia) Lokomotíva Košice
12	1983	Regensburg	(Soviet Union) Lokomotiv Moscow	2 – 1	(Czechoslovakia) Lokomotíva Košice
13	1987	Hissarja & Parvomaj & Plovdiv	(Soviet Union) Lokomotiv Moscow	3 – 1	(Bulgaria) Lokomotiv Plovdiv
14	1991	Duisburg	(Soviet Union) FC Lokomotiv Nizhny Novgorod		
15	1995	Haarlem	(Netherlands)		
16	1999	St Brevin les Pins & St Michel-Chef-Chef	(Slovakia)		
17	2003	Varna	(Bulgaria) Lokomotiv Mezdra		
18	2007	Trutnov	(Russia)		(Slovenia)
19	2011	Le Verdon	(France)		(Russia)
20	2015	Sochi	(Belarus)		(France)
21	2019	Saint Mandrier	(Belarus)		(Russia)
22	2023	Albena	(Bulgaria)	2 – 1	(Germany)

Notes:

- Note 1: Victory awarded to Yugoslavia who had more corner kicks.
- Note 2: (Soviet Union) Kairat Almaty was the first Soviet Team to win a European Cup.

== Performances ==
=== By club ===
Club	Winners	Runners-up	Winning seasons	Runners-up seasons
(Soviet Union) Lokomotiv Moscow	5	1	1974, 1976, 1979, 1983, 1987	1963
(Bulgaria) Lokomotiv Sofia	2	2	1961, 1963	1968, 1974
(Romania) Rapid București	1	2	1968	1961, 1971
(Bulgaria) Lokomotiv Mezdra	1	–	2003	–
(Soviet Union) Kairat Almaty	1	–	1971	–
(Soviet Union) FC Lokomotiv Nizhny Novgorod	1	–	1991	–
(Czechoslovakia) Lokomotíva Košice	–	3	–	1976, 1979, 1983
(Bulgaria) Lokomotiv Plovdiv	–	1	–	1987

== See also ==
- Cup of the Alps
