= Veaceslav =

Veaceslav is a given name. Notable people with the name include:

- Veaceslav Gojan (born 1983), Moldovan amateur boxer who won Bantamweight bronze at the 2008 Olympics
- Veaceslav Ioniţă (born 1973), economist and politician from Moldova
- Veaceslav Iordan (born 1966), Moldovan politician who served as interim general mayor of Chişinău
- Veaceslav Negruţă, Moldovan politician
- Veaceslav Platon, Moldovan politician
- Veaceslav Sofroni (born 1984), Moldovan professional football player
- Veaceslav Ţâbuleac, journalist from the Republic of Moldova
- Veaceslav Untilă (born 1956), Moldovan politician

== See also ==
- Viacheslav
- Vyacheslav (disambiguation)
- Václav (disambiguation)
