= Vyacheslav Dmitriyenko =

Russian footballer and coach

Personal information
- Full name: Vyacheslav Vladimirovich Dmitriyenko
- Date of birth: 6 March 1977 (age 49)
- Height: 1.82 m (5 ft 11 1/2 in)
- Position: Goalkeeper

Team information
- Current team: FC Chayka Peschanokopskoye (GK coach)

Senior career*
Years	Team	Apps	(Gls)
1996–1997	FC Spartak-Bratskiy Yuzhny	15	(0)
1999–2000	FC Torpedo Taganrog	51	(0)
2001–2002	FC Iskra Engels	15	(0)
2005	FC Alternativa Rostov-on-Don (D4)		
2006	FC Taganrog	30	(0)
2007–2008	FC Bataysk-2007	46	(0)
2008	FC SKA Rostov-on-Don	1	(0)
2009–2012	FC Lokomotiv Liski	112	(0)

Managerial career
- 2015–2018: FC SKA Rostov-on-Don (GK coach)
- 2022–: FC Chayka Peschanokopskoye (GK coach)
- * Club domestic league appearances and goals

Vyacheslav Vladimirovich Dmitriyenko (Russian: Вячеслав Владимирович Дмитриенко; born 6 March 1977) is a Russian professional football coach and a former player. He is the goalkeepers' coach at FC Chayka Peschanokopskoye.

== Club career ==
Dmitriyenko played in the Russian Football National League for FC SKA Rostov-on-Don in 2008.
