= Andrei Chistyakov (ice hockey) =

- Born: March 14, 1962 (age 63); Ufa, Russian SFSR, Soviet Union
- Height: 6 ft 0 in (183 cm)
- Weight: 194 lb (88 kg; 13 st 12 lb)
- Position: Defence
- Shot: Left
- Played for: Salavat Yulaev Ufa; Spartak Moscow
- Playing career: 1980–1999

Andrei Chistyakov (Андрей Чистяков, born March 14, 1962) is a retired professional ice hockey player who played in the Soviet Hockey League for Salavat Yulaev Ufa and HC Spartak Moscow.

== Career statistics ==
			Regular season					Playoffs
Season	Team	League	GP	G	A	Pts	PIM	GP	G	A	Pts	PIM
1980–81	Salavat Yulaev Ufa	USSR	?	2	1	3	10	—	—	—	—	—
1981–82	Spartak Moscow	USSR	20	1	0	1	20	—	—	—	—	—
1982–83	Spartak Moscow	USSR	32	4	4	8	22	—	—	—	—	—
1983–84	Spartak Moscow	USSR	41	0	5	5	18	—	—	—	—	—
1984–85	Spartak Moscow	USSR	49	4	5	9	37	—	—	—	—	—
1985–86	Spartak Moscow	USSR	23	0	0	0	8	—	—	—	—	—
1986–87	Spartak Moscow	USSR	40	4	1	5	12	—	—	—	—	—
1987–88	Spartak Moscow	USSR	36	0	2	2	28	—	—	—	—	—
1988–89	Spartak Moscow	USSR	30	2	3	5	14	—	—	—	—	—
1989–90	Spartak Moscow	USSR	45	5	2	7	41	—	—	—	—	—
1990–91	Spartak Moscow	USSR	45	3	2	5	44	—	—	—	—	—
1991–92	Timrå	SWE-2	36	5	13	18	34	—	—	—	—	—
1992–93	Timrå	SWE-2	32	4	6	10	38	5	2	1	3	8
1993–94	Spartak Moscow	IHL	9	0	0	0	4	—	—	—	—	—
1994–95	Östersund	SWE-2	29	0	3	3	50	—	—	—	—	—
1997–98	Furuset	GET	37	6	8	14	38	—	—	—	—	—
1998–99	Furuset	GET	41	1	6	7	24	—	—	—	—	—
