= Vyacheslav Rodin =

Russian footballer (born 1981)

Personal information
- Full name: Vyacheslav Eduardovich Rodin
- Date of birth: 24 February 1981 (age 45)
- Height: 1.92 m (6 ft 3 1/2 in)
- Position: Defender

Youth career
- DYuSSh Smena-Zenit

Senior career*
Years	Team	Apps	(Gls)
1999–2003	FC Zenit-2 Saint Petersburg	148	(6)
1999–2001	FC Zenit Saint Petersburg	0	(0)
2004–2006	FC Lada Togliatti	75	(7)
2007–2008	FC Dynamo Saint Petersburg	59	(4)
2009–2012	FC Sakhalin Yuzhno-Sakhalinsk	76	(2)
2012–2013	FC Piter Saint Petersburg	13	(1)
2015	FC Gruzovichkof Saint Petersburg		
2017	FC LAZ Saint Petersburg		
- * Club domestic league appearances and goals

Vyacheslav Eduardovich Rodin (Russian: Вячеслав Эдуардович Родин; born 24 February 1981) is a former Russian professional football player.

== Club career ==
He played in the Russian Football National League for FC Lada Togliatti in 2006.
