= Maksim Chistyakov =

Russian football player

Personal information
- Full name: Maksim Anatolyevich Chistyakov
- Date of birth: 25 September 1986 (age 40)
- Place of birth: Voronezh, Russian SFSR
- Height: 1.77 m (5 ft 10 in)
- Position: Midfielder

Youth career
- FC Rotor Volgograd

Senior career*
Years	Team	Apps	(Gls)
2002–2005	FC Rotor Volgograd	19	(1)
2006	FC Rostov	0	(0)
2007	FC Trud Voronezh (amateur)		
2008	FC Fakel Voronezh (amateur)		
2010	FC Krylia Sovetov Samara	0	(0)
2015	FC Atom Novovoronezh (amateur)		
- * Club domestic league appearances and goals

Maksim Anatolyevich Chistyakov (Russian: Максим Анатольевич Чистяков; born 25 September 1986) is a Russian former football player.
