= Vyacheslav Volkov =

Russian footballer and coach

Personal information
- Full name: Vyacheslav Yuryevich Volkov
- Date of birth: 9 November 1970 (age 55)
- Place of birth: Pskov, Russian SFSR
- Height: 1.91 m (6 ft 3 in)
- Position: Defender

Team information
- Current team: FC Pskov-747 (asst coach)

Youth career
- FC Mashinostroitel Pskov

Senior career*
Years	Team	Apps	(Gls)
1991–1994	FC Mashinostroitel Pskov	130	(10)
1995	FC Trion-Volga Tver	15	(2)
1995	FC Chernomorets Novorossiysk	12	(0)
1996–1997	FC Arsenal Tula	63	(5)
1998	FC Pskov	12	(0)
1999	FC Dynamo Vologda	33	(0)
2000–2006	FC Pskov-747	144	(4)

Managerial career
- 2008–: FC Pskov-747 (assistant)
- * Club domestic league appearances and goals

Vyacheslav Yuryevich Volkov (Russian: Вячеслав Юрьевич Волков; born 9 November 1970) is a Russian professional football coach and a former player. He works as an assistant manager with FC Pskov-747.

== Career ==
Volkov began playing football with local side FC Mashinostroitel Pskov. He spent most of his career playing the Russian Second Division, but had spells in the Russian First Division with FC Chernomorets Novorossiysk and FC Arsenal Tula.

He is the father of Vladislav Volkov.
