= Aleksandr Chistyakov (footballer, born 1988) =

Russian footballer

Personal information
- Full name: Aleksandr Yakovlevich Chistyakov
- Date of birth: 4 June 1988 (age 38)
- Place of birth: Khabarovsk, Russian SFSR
- Height: 1.81 m (5 ft 11 1/2 in)
- Positions: Forward; midfielder

Senior career*
Years	Team	Apps	(Gls)
2007	FC SKA-Energiya Khabarovsk	0	(0)
2008	FC Smena Komsomolsk-na-Amure	6	(0)
2009	FC SKA-Energiya Khabarovsk	7	(1)
2010	FC SKA-Energiya Khabarovsk	2	(0)
2011–2012	FC Amur-2010 Blagoveshchensk	35	(3)
2014–2016	FC Smena Komsomolsk-na-Amure	30	(8)
- * Club domestic league appearances and goals

Aleksandr Yakovlevich Chistyakov (Russian: Александр Яковлевич Чистяков; born 4 June 1988) is a former Russian professional football player.

== Club career ==
He played two seasons in the Russian Football National League for FC SKA-Energiya Khabarovsk.
