= Vyacheslav Lunyov =

Soviet footballer (born 1940)

Personal information
- Full name: Vyacheslav Petrovich Lunyov
- Date of birth: 9 May 1940 (age 86)
- Place of birth: Borzya, Russian SFSR
- Position: Goalkeeper

Youth career
- FShM Minsk

Senior career*
Years	Team	Apps	(Gls)
1959–1961	Belarus Minsk	29	(0)
1962	Spartak Krasnodar	3	(0)
1963–1964	Zenit Izhevsk	9	(0)
1965–1968	Lokomotiv Kaluga	81	(0)
- * Club domestic league appearances and goals as of 13 December 2014

Vyacheslav Petrovich Lunyov (Russian: Вячеслав Петрович Лунёв; born 9 May 1940) is a Soviet football goalkeeper. Master of Sports of the USSR.

The graduate of FShM Minsk. Since 1959 to 1961 he played for Belarus Minsk (known in 1959 as Spartak). He played a total of 29 matches, 7 of them in the Soviet Top League.

Spent 1962 season in FC Spartak (Krasnodar), playing 3 games, as the team eventually won the Class B and a champion of the RSFSR. From 1963 to 1964 he played for FC Zenit from Izhevsk. From 1965 to 1968, he defended the colors of FC Lokomotiv Kaluga, playing 81 games and in 1966 became the champion RSFSR.
