= Vyacheslav Kovneristov =

Russian footballer

Personal information
- Full name: Vyacheslav Petrovich Kovneristov
- Date of birth: 20 March 1973 (age 53)
- Height: 1.92 m (6 ft 3 1/2 in)
- Position: Goalkeeper

Senior career*
Years	Team	Apps	(Gls)
1993	FC Atommash Volgodonsk		
1994–1996	FC Spartak-Bratskiy Yuzhny	82	(0)
1997	FC KAMAZ-Chally Naberezhnye Chelny	4	(0)
1997	FC Neftekhimik Nizhnekamsk	5	(0)
1998	FC KAMAZ-Chally Naberezhnye Chelny	27	(0)
1999	FC Lada-Simbirsk Dimitrovgrad	9	(0)
2000	FC Arsenal Tula	0	(0)
2000	FC Nosta Novotroitsk	3	(0)
2001–2003	FC SKA Rostov-on-Don	21	(0)
2003	FC Uralan Elista (reserves)	2	(0)
2004	did not play		
2005	FC Volga Nizhny Novgorod	36	(0)
2006–2009	FC SKA Rostov-on-Don	65	(0)
- * Club domestic league appearances and goals

Vyacheslav Petrovich Kovneristov (Russian: Вячеслав Петрович Ковнеристов; born 20 March 1973) is a former Russian professional footballer. He made his debut in the Russian Premier League in 1997 for FC KAMAZ-Chally Naberezhnye Chelny.
