= Vyacheslav Lugovkin =

Russian footballer

Personal information
- Full name: Vyacheslav Borisovich Lugovkin
- Date of birth: 13 February 1968 (age 58)
- Place of birth: Rybinsk, Russian SFSR
- Height: 1.72 m (5 ft 8 in)
- Position: Midfielder

Senior career*
Years	Team	Apps	(Gls)
1985–1988	FC Saturn Andropov	40	(3)
1989	FC Chayka-CSKA Moscow	28	(2)
1990–1991	PFC CSKA Moscow	0	(0)
1991–1992	FC Shinnik Yaroslavl	21	(0)
1993–1996	FC Rostselmash Rostov-on-Don	99	(5)
1996–1997	FC Tyumen	47	(3)
1998	FC Arsenal Tula	0	(0)
1998–1999	FC Volgar-Gazprom Astrakhan	24	(1)
1999–2000	FC SKA-Zvezda Rybinsk		
2001–2002	FC Rybinsk	31	(2)
2002	FC Avtomobilist Noginsk	13	(2)
2003	FC Kosmos Elektrostal	31	(0)

Managerial career
- 2001: FC Rybinsk (assistant)
- 2007: FC Znamya Truda Orekhovo-Zuyevo (massage therapist)
- 2008: FC Znamya Truda Orekhovo-Zuyevo (assistant)
- 2012: FC Saturn Ramenskoye (assistant)
- 2012: FC Znamya Truda Orekhovo-Zuyevo
- 2016–2019: UOR #5 Yegoryevsk
- 2019: FC Khimki-M (assistant)
- 2019–2020: FC Khimki-M
- 2021: FC Znamya Truda Orekhovo-Zuyevo
- 2021: FC Znamya Truda Orekhovo-Zuyevo (assistant)
- 2022: FC Znamya Noginsk
- 2023–2025: FC Znamya Truda Orekhovo-Zuyevo
- 2025: FC Murom (assistant)
- 2025: FC Murom (caretaker)
- * Club domestic league appearances and goals

Vyacheslav Borisovich Lugovkin (Russian: Вячеслав Борисович Луговкин; born 13 February 1968) is a Russian professional football coach and a former player.

== Club career ==
He made his professional debut in the Soviet Second League in 1985 for FC Saturn Andropov.

== Honours ==
- Soviet Cup winner: 1991 (played for the main squad of PFC CSKA Moscow in the tournament).
