= Oleg Chistyakov =

Russian footballer and coach (born 1976)

Personal information
- Full name: Oleg Sergeyevich Chistyakov
- Date of birth: 21 April 1976 (age 50)
- Place of birth: Cherepovets, Vologda Oblast, Russian SFSR
- Height: 1.85 m (6 ft 1 in)
- Position: Forward

Senior career*
Years	Team	Apps	(Gls)
1993–1996	FC Bulat Cherepovets	70	(5)
1997	FC Lokomotiv Liski	21	(1)
1998	FC Oryol	13	(1)
1998	FC Metallurg Lipetsk	8	(0)
1999	FC Arsenal-2 Tula	33	(4)
2000	FC Kuban Krasnodar	28	(2)
2001–2002	FC Dynamo Vologda	66	(3)
2003	FC Spartak Kostroma	34	(2)
2004	FC Severstal Cherepovets	13	(0)
2005	FC Dynamo Vologda	24	(1)
2008	FC Tekstilshchik Ivanovo	25	(0)
2009	FC Dynamo Vologda	17	(0)

Managerial career
- 2011–2012: FC Sheksna Cherepovets (assistant)
- * Club domestic league appearances and goals

Oleg Sergeyevich Chistyakov (Russian: Олег Серге́евич Чистяков; born 21 April 1976) is a Russian professional football coach and a former player.

== Club career ==
He played in the Russian Football National League for FC Metallurg Lipetsk in 1998.
