= FC Kairat =

Association football club in Kazakhstan

Kairat Almaty
- Full name: Football Club Kairat «Қайрат» футбол клубы "Qairat" futbol kluby
- Nickname: Sary-Qaralar ('Yellow-blacks')
- Founded: 1954; 72 years ago as Lokomotiv Alma-Ata
- Ground: Almaty Central Stadium
- Capacity: 23,804
- Chairman: Kairat Boranbayev
- Manager: Vacant
- League: Kazakhstan Premier League
- 2025: Kazakhstan Premier League, 1st of 14 (Champions)
- Website: fckairat.com
Home colours	Away colours	Third colours

Football Club Kairat (Kazakh: «Қайрат» футбол клубы, romanized: «Qairat» futbol kluby) is a professional football club based in Almaty, which plays in the Kazakhstan Premier League, the highest level of Kazakh football. Founded in 1954 as Lokomotiv Alma-Ata, they became Urozhay in 1955 and Kairat in 1956. The club's home ground is the Central Stadium which has a capacity of 23,804 seats. The club's home kit colours are yellow and black striped shirts, black shorts and black socks.

Kairat was the leading Kazakh club during the Soviet period and the only representative of the Kazakh Soviet Socialist Republic in the Soviet Top League. For this, Kairat became nicknamed The Nation's Team, and remains widely supported all over the country. All in all, the club spent 24 seasons in the Soviet highest level. They also won Soviet First League titles twice, in 1976 and 1983. During this period, Kairat was a part of the Voluntary Sports Societies of the Soviet Union.

In modern history, Kairat won five league titles, eight Kazakhstan Cups and two Kazakhstan Super Cups. The club's strongest rivalry is FC Astana, among fans their matches are considered as the Two Capitals Derby.

== History ==
=== Founding ===
The club was founded in 1954 as Lokomotiv Alma-Ata on the basis of the football club Dinamo Alma-Ata. Heretofore, Dinamo was developed by Nikolai Starostin, who is mostly known as "the father of Soviet football" and founder of the Spartak Moscow. His assistant Arkady Khokhman became the first head coach of the club. Lokomotiv joined Zone I of the Class B, the second tier of Soviet football. In their debut season, they finished 4th with 11 wins, 7 draws and 4 defeats. In 1955, they were reformed as Urozhay Sports Society, which united sportsmen of agricultural sphere. In 1955, Urozhay competed in Zone II of the Class B, finishing season in 10th place. On 1 June 1956, the Council of Ministers of the Kazakh SSR signed a decree about merger of the Urozhay Sports Society and Republican Sports Society of Collective Farmers to found new Republican Rural Voluntary Sports Society. Thereafter, Kazakh sports governing body proposed to adopt new name in recognition of the merger. Suggested names included Yeginshi (Cultivator), Tulpar (Phoenix), Onim (Harvest), Altyn Dan (Golden Grain), Kuresshi (Fighter), Dala Burkiti (Steppe Eagle) and Zhastar (The Youth). On 18 June 1956, plenary session of the Council of Ministers unanimously voted for Kairat (Power), the name missing in proposals, apparently promoted by then the leader of Kazakh SSR Dinmukhamed Kunayev. In July 1956, Pyotr Zenkin appointed as a new head coach. Under Zenkin, Kairat spent four consecutive seasons in the Class B, showing average results on final tables.

=== The Nation's Team (1960–1991) ===
Crest used from 1960s to early 1970s

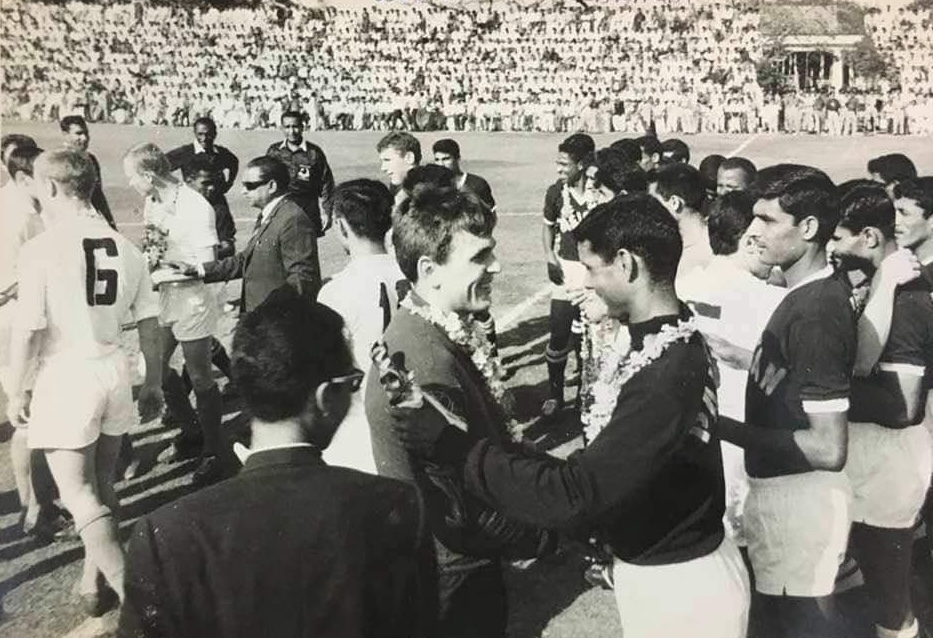
FC Kairat in a friendly against Pakistan at the KMC Stadium in 1968

On 21 December 1959, Soviet sports governing body adopted a resolution on expansion of Soviet Top League teams number from 12 to 22. Ten Soviet republics were able to enter by one team without competition, permission which was aimed to make league status more "All-Union". Kazakh side gave a spot to Kairat, who had strong lobbying from the country administration. On 10 April 1960, they played their first competitive match in the league against Admiralteyets Leningrad, with a score of 0–0. On 13 May 1960, Kairat registered their first Top League victory defeating Dinamo Minsk 2–1 in away match. During the season, tactical scheme of Kairat caused a lot of discussion among football specialists. Team manager Nikolay Glebov adopted 4–2–4 and 4–3–3 formations, so-called Brazilian schemes, previously not used by Soviet teams. As a result, team playing style became strictly defensive. For this, Soviet press and fans nicknamed team defense "Kairat Concrete", an epithet which was associated with the club during the next decades. In spite of this, weaknesses in the offensive part and a poor goal scoring rate led only to 18th place in their inaugural season in the top level.

Kairat stayed at the top level for another three seasons. In 1963, Kairat did their best result in the Soviet Cup, reaching semi-final against Shakhtar Stalino. For this accomplishment, all team members were equated the Master of Sport of the USSR rank. After failure season in 1964, they relegated to the Soviet First League. On 25 November 1965, they played the decisive match against Ararat Yerevan for only spot in the Top League. Kairat lost the game 1–2. However, this day teams managers took a telegram from Football Federation of USSR about decision on promotion of both clubs, an information hidden from players until the end of the match. In March 1968, the team toured Pakistan where they played four test matches, all ending in victory.

Kairat dropped once again to the First League at the end of the 1969 season under the management of Andrey Chen Ir Son. Chen Ir Son was replaced by Aleksandr Sevidov. He steered Kairat back to the Top League, finishing as runners-up in the 1970 Soviet First League season. Next season, Sevidov left the team to head Dynamo Kiev.

Crest used in late 1970s to 1980s

The 1971 season was highly successful for the club. Under Viktor Korolkov rule, Kairat finished 8th in the Top League, a significant increase compared to previous seasons. On 12 November 1971, Kairat won the European Railworks Cup, defeating Rapid Bucharest 2–1 in the final. This achievement made Kairat the first Soviet team to win a European tournament. In subsequent two seasons, the club kept its registry in the Top League. In 1974, under Artyom Falyan Kairat finished the season in 15th place and they were relegated once more. Next year, new head coach Vsevolod Bobrov could not get a promotion, finishing season 4th. In 1976, under the dual management of Timur Segizbayev and Stanislav Kaminskiy, the club won the Soviet First League and returned to top level. The deuce of head coaches managed the team for the next two years. In the 1977-1978 Top League seasons, Kairat finished 8th and 12th respectively. In the 1979 season, Karat headed by the deuce of Segizbayev and Igor Volchok led the club to 13th place in the league.

In 1980, Igor Volchok, already as a sole head coach, built up the team dominantly consisted of young players. Among them were Yevstafi Pekhlevanidi, Vakhid Masudov, Anton Shokh, Sergei Volgin, Sergei Ledovskikh and Kurban Berdyev, who became the key players of the club in the 80s. Kairat finished the 1980 season in 12th place with 10 wins, 11 draws and 13 defeats. For the most wins with a comeback, the team won the For the Will of Victory Prize, awarded by the Soviet Russia newspaper. In the 1982 season, under Yozhef Betsa coaching, team results had been sharply declined. Towards the end of the season Betsa was replaced by Leonid Ostroushko. However, he did not have time to rectify the situation and they were relegated to the First League. In the 1986 season, Ostroushko led the club to 7th place, the best result of Kairat in the Soviet Top League. In the 1988 season, under Segizbayev rule, Kairat relegated to the First League once more. Despite this failure the team ended the season with success. On 22 November 1988, Kairat won the USSR Federation Cup. In the final in Kishinev, the club beat Neftchi Baku 4–1, where all four goal scored by Kairat's forward Viktor Karachun. Until the dissolution of the Soviet Union in the end of 1991, Kairat was a member of the First League, season-by-season showing decline.

=== First Kazakh champions and secession (1992–2000) ===
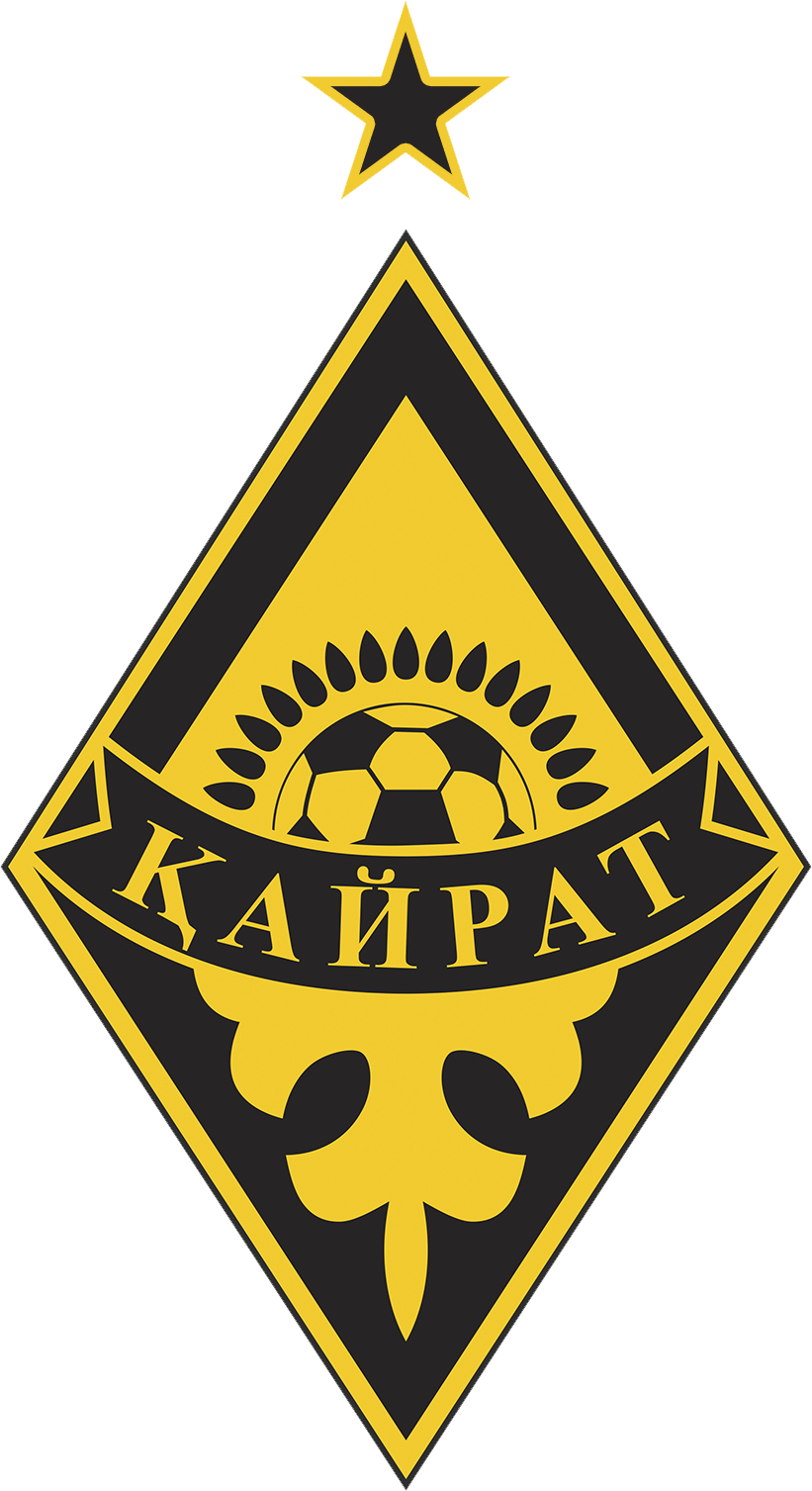
Crest used until 2018.

As a result of the subsequent independence of Kazakhstan, Kairat joined the newly formed Kazakhstan Premier League. Being the strongest Kazakh club at that time, Kairat was chosen as a base club to form the Kazakhstan national football team. Therefore, the club manager Bakhtiyar Baiseitov also headed the national team. In the inaugural season of the league, the club became champion. They also reached their first double, winning Fosfor Taraz in the 1992 Kazakhstan Cup Final.

Next season, Kairat records deteriorated sharply. The 11th place in the 1993 season led to dismissal of Baiseitov. Following two seasons, under management of former Kairat player Kurban Berdyev Kairat finished 11th and 9th. In 1997, another Kairat veteran Vakhid Masudov led the team to their second Kazakhstan Cup success. In the end of the season, Kairat had financial troubles due to financial crisis in the country. The Ministry of Defense of Kazakhstan decided to become a main sponsor and take the team under its wing. However, the half of the team did not agree with the decision to be under military control. As a result of disagreement, Kairat was divided into two teams, Kairat Sports and Health Professional Football Club, shortly Kairat SHPFC, and Kairat-CSKA, who took sponsorship of the state military body. The last got a right to Premier League register, while Kairat SHPFC went to Kazakhstan First Division. In the 1998 season, Kairat SHPFC found a sponsorship from Kazakh businessman Bulat Abilov, whose support led to Kazakhstan First Division win and promotion to Premier League. The next two seasons marked the participation of both Kairats in the league. The fully crowded Central Stadium hosted their matches against each other and caused great interest but also contradictions among the fans. In 2000, Kairat SHPFC won the Kazakhstan Cup, beating 5–0 Access-Golden Grain in the final.

=== Reunification, the second title and stagnation (2001–2009) ===
On 1 March 2001, Almaty Deputy Mayor Kairat Bukenov announced the reunification of two clubs. Already as unified Kairat, they won two Kazakhstan Cups, in 2001 and 2003. In 2004, under the Aleksei Petrushin rule the club won their second domestic title.

At the end of the 2006 season, the main sponsor of the club Kazakhstan Temir Zholy, withdrew. This precipitated a financial troubles which lasted until the start of 2007 season. Consequently, most of the club's players switched to other teams. The club entered the 2007 season with an inexperienced, young team. In July 2007, a group of private investors took over the club and invested around 4 million US dollars in it. At the beginning of 2009, the club declared itself bankrupt and was relegated to the First Division. Kairat became the champion of the First Division and returned to top-flight in November 2009.

=== Recent years and UEFA Champions League (2010–present) ===
On 15 October 2018, Carlos Alós left Kairat by mutual consent, with Andrei Karpovich being appointed as Caretaker manager. On 25 November 2018, Kairat presented Aleksey Shpilevsky as their new manager. Kairat won the 2020 Kazakhstan Premier League after sixteen years. On 7 June 2021, Aleksey Shpilevsky left Kairat to join Erzgebirge Aue. On 24 August 2021, Kurban Berdyev was appointed manager of the Kazakhstan Premier League club FC Kairat. Berdyev left Kairat by mutual consent on 6 June 2022. Kirill Keker was appointed as the clubs permanent Head Coach two days later on 8 June 2022.

Kairat won the 2024 Kazakhstan Premier League and qualified for the 2025–26 UEFA Champions League qualifying stage. In the first qualifying round, Kairat defeated Olimpija Ljubljana 3–1 in on aggregate. Kairat then won the second qualifying round against Kuopion Palloseura 3–2 on aggregate and reached the play-off round after defeating Slovan Bratislava on penalties in the third qualifying round. On 26 August, they qualified for the Champions League league phase for the first time in their history, defeating Celtic in the playoffs 3–2 on penalties after both legs ended goalless. After being drawn to play against Sporting CP in the first round of the league stage, they made history by making the longest trip in the history of the UEFA Champions League, flying 6,900 kilometres from Almaty to Lisbon.

== Stadium ==
In their earlier years, Kairat played their home games at the Spartak Stadium. Building of the club's present ground Almaty Central Stadium started in 1956. The initiator of the building was the then leader of the Kazakh SSR Leonid Brezhnev. The location for the stadium in the square surrounded by Abay, Baitursynov, Satpayev streets and the Yesentai River was chosen by Brezhnev himself. Architect Adambay Kapanov took the Luzhniki Stadium in Moscow as a model for the new stadium. Being smaller than Luzhniki, the stadium later was nicknamed as the Small Luzhniki. The arena was also projected with running track and the number of elements for athletic events. The Central Stadium was commissioned in 1958. However, the first official match was held here on 10 April 1960. On this day, Kairat played their debut match in the Soviet Top League against Admiralteyets Leningrad, which ended with a score of 0–0. Initially, the stadium benches seated around 35,000 people. In 1997, the stadium was renovated. As a result of old wood benches being replaced by individual plastic chairs, the capacity was reduced to 23,804 seats.

During the Soviet period, the Central stadium was state property. After the independence of Kazakhstan, the stadium was owned by the City Council of Almaty. In 2015, the stadium was transferred to the ownership of Kairat for exchange of 30% of shares of the club.

== Players ==
=== First-team squad ===
As of 18 July 2026

Note: Flags indicate national team as defined under FIFA eligibility rules; some limited exceptions apply. Players may hold more than one non-FIFA nationality.

No.	Pos.	Nation	Player
1	GK	KAZ	Temirlan Anarbekov
3	DF	POR	Luís Mata
4	DF	KAZ	Damir Kasabulat
5	DF	KAZ	Lev Kurgin
6	MF	KAZ	Adilet Sadybekov
7	FW	POR	Jorginho
8	MF	KAZ	Olzhas Baybek
9	FW	BRA	Edmilson
13	MF	FIN	Jaakko Oksanen
14	DF	BLR	Alyaksandr Martynovich (captain)
15	FW	KAZ	Mansur Birkurmanov
17	MF	KAZ	Azamat Tuyakbaev
19	MF	FIN	Oiva Jukkola

No.	Pos.	Nation	Player
20	DF	KAZ	Yerkin Tapalov
22	MF	POR	Gustavo Mendonça
24	DF	KAZ	Aleksandr Mrynskiy
25	DF	KAZ	Alexander Shirobokov
27	MF	KAZ	Mukhamedali Abish
28	FW	ESP	Marc Gual
30	GK	KAZ	Danila Buch
32	DF	KAZ	Adlan Nurgaliev
44	DF	BRA	Lucas Áfrico
59	DF	KAZ	Daniyar Tashpulatov
81	MF	KAZ	Ismail Bekbolat
82	GK	KAZ	Sherkhan Kalmurza

=== Under-21s and Academy ===
Note: Flags indicate national team as defined under FIFA eligibility rules; some limited exceptions apply. Players may hold more than one non-FIFA nationality.

No.	Pos.	Nation	Player

=== Out on loan ===
Note: Flags indicate national team as defined under FIFA eligibility rules; some limited exceptions apply. Players may hold more than one non-FIFA nationality.

No.	Pos.	Nation	Player
—	DF	KAZ	Sultan Askarov (at Kaisar)
23	FW	KAZ	Ramazan Bagdat (at Kaisar)

== Non-playing staff ==
=== Management ===
Position	Staff
Chairman of the supervisory board	(Kazakhstan) Kairat Boranbayev
General manager	(Kazakhstan) Askar Yesimov
Sporting director	(Kazakhstan) Arman Birkurmanov
Technical director	(Kazakhstan) Evgeniy Krasikov
Sporting director of the women's team	(Kazakhstan) Suzanna Kornetsova

Last updated: September 2025

=== Coaching staff ===
Position	Staff
Assistant coach	(Kazakhstan) Maksim Zuev
Assistant coach	(Kazakhstan) Sergey Kutzov
Assistant coach	(Kazakhstan) Artem Gavrilenko
Goalkeeping coach	(Kazakhstan) Ilya Yurov
Fitness coach	(Kazakhstan) Artem Savelyev
Doctor	(Kazakhstan) Dastan Turaliev
Physiotherapist	(Brazil) Thiago Vieira
Physiotherapist	(Brazil) Victor Aleandro
Massage therapist	(Kazakhstan) Sergey Bibikov
Massage therapist	(Kazakhstan) Aleksandr Shapkin
Nurse	(Kazakhstan) Shahida Razbakieva
Senior administrator	(Kazakhstan) Ramil Yusupov
Administrator	(Kazakhstan) Mirolsav Priz
Translator	(Kazakhstan) Aymukhamet Akbuzov
Video analyst	(Kazakhstan) Elshad Khinizov
Chief scout	(Kazakhstan) Kasymkhan Talasbaev
Head of security	(Kazakhstan) Dauren Sarsabaev
Media officer	(Kazakhstan) Arman Dzhaksygulov
SMM manager	(Kazakhstan) Shyryn Zheniskyzy

Last updated: September 2025

=== Notable managers ===
The following managers won at least one trophy when in charge of Kairat:

Name	Period	Trophies
(Soviet Union) Viktor Korolkov	1971–1972	European Railworks Cup
(Soviet Union) Stanislav Kaminsky	1976–1978	Soviet First League
(Soviet Union) Leonid Ostroushko	1983–1986	Soviet First League
(Kazakhstan) Bakhtiyar Baiseitov	1992–1993	Kazakhstan Premier League, Kazakhstan Cup
(Kazakhstan) Vakhid Masudov	1996–1998	Kazakhstan Cup
(Kazakhstan) Vladimir Nikitenko	1999–2000	Kazakhstan Cup
(Kazakhstan) Vakhid Masudov	2001	Kazakhstan Cup
(Kazakhstan) Leonid Ostroushko	2003	Kazakhstan Cup
(Russia) Aleksei Petrushin	2004–2005	Kazakhstan Premier League
(Slovakia) Vladimír Weiss	2012–2015	Kazakhstan Cup
(Georgia (country)) Kakhaber Tskhadadze	2016–2017	2 Kazakhstan Super Cups
(Spain) Carlos Alós Ferrer	2017–2018	Kazakhstan Cup
(Belarus) Aleksey Shpilevsky	2018–2021	Kazakhstan Premier League
(Turkmenistan) Kurban Berdyev	2021–2022	Kazakhstan Cup
(Kazakhstan) Rafael Urazbakhtin	2024–2026	Kazakhstan Premier League, Kazakhstan Super Cup

== Honours ==
- Kazakhstan Premier League
  - Winners (5): 1992, 2004, 2020, 2024, 2025
- Kazakhstan First Division
  - Winners (1): 2009
- Soviet First League
  - Winners (2): 1976, 1983
- Kazakhstan Cup
  - Winners (10): 1992, 1996–97, 1999–2000, 2001, 2003, 2014, 2015, 2017, 2018, 2021 (record)
- Kazakhstan Super Cup
  - Winners (3): 2016, 2017, 2025
- USSR Federation Cup
  - Winners (1): 1988

=== European ===
- European Railways Cup
  - Winners (1): 1971

== Statistics ==
=== Recent seasons ===
The table below shows club's performance over the last 17 seasons:

Season	League	Rank	P	W	D	L	F	A	GD	Pts	Cup	CL	EL	ECL
2009	First	1	26	19	4	3	63	21	38	42	Round 1	—	—	—
2010	Premier	10	32	6	11	15	17	38	−21	29	Round 3	—	—	—
2011	Premier	11	32	8	8	16	30	49	−19	22	Quarterfinals	—	—	—
2012	Premier	10	26	7	8	11	23	34	−11	29	Round 2	—	—	—
2013	Premier	3	32	12	12	8	44	38	6	33	Round 2	—	—	—
2014	Premier	3	32	18	5	9	58	31	27	38	Winners	—	2QR	—
2015	Premier	2	32	20	7	5	60	19	41	45	Winners	—	PO	—
2016	Premier	2	32	22	5	5	75	30	45	71	Runner-up	—	2QR	—
2017	Premier	2	33	23	5	5	78	32	46	74	Winners	—	2QR	—
2018	Premier	2	33	19	5	9	60	33	27	62	Winners	—	3QR	—
2019	Premier	2	33	22	2	9	65	32	33	68	Quarterfinals	—	2QR	—
2020	Premier	1	20	14	3	3	48	19	29	45	—	—	2QR	—
2021	Premier	3	26	14	9	3	52	21	31	51	Winners	2QR	3QR	GS
2022	Premier	4	26	12	6	8	34	36	−2	42	Quarterfinals	—	—	2QR
2023	Premier	4	26	12	8	6	44	32	12	44	Quarterfinals	—	—	—
2024	Premier	1	24	14	5	5	39	21	18	47	Quarterfinals	—	—	—
2025	Premier	1	26	18	5	3	53	19	34	59	Quarterfinals	LP	—	—

Key

Rank = Rank in the league; P = Played; W = Win; D = Draw; L = Loss; F = Goals for; A = Goals against; GD = Goal difference; Pts = Points; Cup = Kazakhstan Cup; CL = UEFA Champions League; EL = UEFA Europa League; ECL = UEFA Europa Conference League.
in = Still in competition; – = Not attended; 1R = 1st round; 2R = 2nd round; 3R = 3rd round; 1QR = 1st qualifying round; 2QR = 2nd qualifying round; 3QR = 3rd qualifying round; PO = Play-off round; GS = Group stage; R16 = Round of sixteen; QF = Quarter-finals; SF = Semi-finals.

=== Continental record ===
Before the Kazakhstan Football Federation joined UEFA in 2002, Kairat took part in the Asian Cup Winners' Cup twice, in 1997–98 and 2000–01. On the latter occasion, they reached the quarter-finals for the first time, losing to Iranian side Esteghlal by an aggregate score of 0–3.

As of match played 22 July 2026

Competition	Played	Won	Drew	Lost	GF	GA	GD	Win%
UEFA Champions League	26	9	5	12	27	39	−12	34.62
UEFA Cup / UEFA Europa League	38	17	7	14	60	41	+19	44.74
UEFA Europa Conference League	10	2	2	6	13	15	−2	20.00
Asian Cup Winners' Cup	10	4	2	4	13	11	+2	40.00
Total	84	32	16	36	113	106	+7	38.10

Legend: GF = Goals For. GA = Goals Against. GD = Goal Difference.

Season	Competition	Round	Opponent	Home	Away	Aggregate
1997–98	Asian Cup Winners' Cup	R1	(Tajikistan) Vakhsh Qurghonteppa	3–0	1–2	4–2
1997–98	Asian Cup Winners' Cup	R2	(Turkmenistan) Köpetdag Aşgabat	3–1	0–2	3–3 (a)
2000–01	Asian Cup Winners' Cup	R1	(Tajikistan) Regar-TadAZ	2–0	1–1	3–1
2000–01	Asian Cup Winners' Cup	R2	(Turkmenistan) Nebitçi Balkanabat	3–1	0–1	3–2
2000–01	Asian Cup Winners' Cup	QF	(Iran) Esteghlal	0–0	0–3	0–3
2002–03	UEFA Cup	QR	(Federal Republic of Yugoslavia) Red Star Belgrade	0–2	0–3	0–5
2005–06	UEFA Champions League	1QR	(Slovakia) Artmedia Bratislava	2–0	1–4 (a.e.t.)	3–4
2006–07	UEFA Cup	1QR	(Hungary) Fehervar	2–1	0–1	2–2 (a)
2014–15	UEFA Europa League	1QR	(Albania) Kukësi	1–0	0–0	1–0
2014–15	UEFA Europa League	2QR	(Denmark) Esbjerg	1–1	0–1	1–2
2015–16	UEFA Europa League	1QR	(Serbia) Red Star Belgrade	2–1	2–0	4–1
2015–16	UEFA Europa League	2QR	(Armenia) Alashkert	3–0	1–2	4–2
2015–16	UEFA Europa League	3QR	(Scotland) Aberdeen	2–1	1–1	3–2
2015–16	UEFA Europa League	PO	(France) Bordeaux	2–1	0–1	2–2 (a)
2016–17	UEFA Europa League	1QR	(Albania) Teuta	5–0	1–0	6–0
2016–17	UEFA Europa League	2QR	(Israel) Maccabi Tel Aviv	1–1	1–2	2–3
2017–18	UEFA Europa League	1QR	(Lithuania) Atlantas	6–0	2–1	8–1
2017–18	UEFA Europa League	2QR	(Albania) Skënderbeu	1–1	0–2	1–3
2018–19	UEFA Europa League	1QR	(Andorra) Engordany	7–1	3–0	10–1
2018–19	UEFA Europa League	2QR	(Netherlands) AZ	2–0	1–2	3–2
2018–19	UEFA Europa League	3QR	(Czech Republic) Sigma Olomouc	1–2	0–2	1–4
2019–20	UEFA Europa League	1QR	(Bosnia and Herzegovina) Široki Brijeg	2–1	2–1	4–2
2019–20	UEFA Europa League	2QR	(Israel) Hapoel Be'er Sheva	1–1	0–2	1–3
2020–21	UEFA Europa League	1QR	(Armenia) Noah	4–1	—N/a	—N/a
2020–21	UEFA Europa League	2QR	(Israel) Maccabi Haifa	—N/a	1–2	—N/a
2021–22	UEFA Champions League	1QR	(Israel) Maccabi Haifa	2–0	1–1	3–1
2021–22	UEFA Champions League	2QR	(Serbia) Red Star Belgrade	2–1	0–5	2–6
2021–22	UEFA Europa League	3QR	(Armenia) Alashkert	0–0	2–3 (a.e.t.)	2–3
2021–22	UEFA Europa Conference League	PO	(Luxembourg) Fola Esch	3–1	4–1	7–2
2021–22	UEFA Europa Conference League	Group H	(Switzerland) Basel	2–3	2–4	4th
2021–22	UEFA Europa Conference League	Group H	(Azerbaijan) Qarabağ	1–2	1–2	4th
2021–22	UEFA Europa Conference League	Group H	(Cyprus) Omonia	0–0	0–0	4th
2022–23	UEFA Europa Conference League	2QR	(Hungary) Kisvárda	0–1	0–1	0−2
2025–26	UEFA Champions League	1QR	(Slovenia) Olimpija Ljubljana	2–0	1–1	3–1
2025–26	UEFA Champions League	2QR	(Finland) KuPS	3–0	0–2	3–2
2025–26	UEFA Champions League	3QR	(Slovakia) Slovan Bratislava	1–0	0–1 (a.e.t.)	1–1 (4–3 p)
2025–26	UEFA Champions League	PO	(Scotland) Celtic	0–0 (a.e.t.)	0–0	0–0 (3–2 p)
2025–26	UEFA Champions League	LP				
2025–26	UEFA Champions League	LP	(Portugal) Sporting CP	—N/a	1–4	36th
2025–26	UEFA Champions League	LP	(Spain) Real Madrid	0–5	—N/a	36th
2025–26	UEFA Champions League	LP	(Cyprus) Pafos	0–0	—N/a	36th
2025–26	UEFA Champions League	LP	(Italy) Inter Milan	—N/a	1–2	36th
2025–26	UEFA Champions League	LP	(Denmark) Copenhagen	—N/a	2–3	36th
2025–26	UEFA Champions League	LP	(Greece) Olympiacos	0–1	—N/a	36th
2025–26	UEFA Champions League	LP	(Belgium) Club Brugge	1–4	—N/a	36th
2025–26	UEFA Champions League	LP	(England) Arsenal	—N/a	2–3	36th
2026–27	UEFA Champions League	1QR	(Montenegro) Sutjeska Nikšić	2–1	2–0	4–1
2026–27	UEFA Champions League	2QR	(Cyprus) Omonia	1–0 (a.e.t.)	0–1	1–1 (6–5 p)
2026–27	UEFA Champions League	3QR	(Bulgaria) Levski Sofia	0–1	0–1	0–2
2026–27	UEFA Europa League	PO	(Belgium) Anderlecht	0–3	0–3	0–6

Key

QR = Qualifying round; 1QR = 1st qualifying round; 2QR = 2nd qualifying round; 3QR = 3rd qualifying round; PO = Play-off round; LP = League phase.

=== UEFA coefficient ===
Correct as of 15 July 2026.

Rank	Team	Points
264	(Sweden) Hammarby	5.500
265	(Malta) Hibernians	5.500
266	(Kazakhstan) Kairat	5.500
267	(Sweden) AIK	5.425
268	(Sweden) IFK Göteborg	5.425

=== Top goalscorers ===
As of match played 9 August 2018

Rank	Player	Years	League	Cup	Super Cup	Europe	Total
1	(Soviet Union) Yevstafi Pekhlevanidi	1980–89	94	11	–	–	105
2	(Ivory Coast) Gerard Gohou	2014–2017	80	8	–	11	99
3	(Kazakhstan) Alibek Buleshev	2000–06, 2007–08	77	12	–	1	90
4	(Soviet Union) Sergey Kvochkin	1960–69	75	6	–	–	81
4	(Soviet Union) Anatoly Ionkin	1972–78	64	4	–	–	68
6	(Soviet Union) (Kazakhstan) Sergei Volgin	1980–85, 1986–89, 1992	42	20	–	–	62
7	(Soviet Union) Leonid Ostroushko	1954–57, 1959–67	56	2	–	–	58
8	(Kazakhstan) Bauyrzhan Islamkhan	2014–2020	43	8	–	6	57
9	(Soviet Union) Sergei Stukashov	1977–84	52	5	–	–	57
10	(Soviet Union) (Kazakhstan) Sergey Klimov	1978–80, 1986, 1989–92, 1996–2000	28	27	–	–	55

== Partnerships ==
- (Portugal) Sporting CP (2015–present)

On 29 January 2015 it was announced that Kairat partnered with the Primeira Liga team Sporting CP to cooperate in terms of exchange of skills and knowledge, scouting and training camps for the Kairat Academy players in the Sporting CP Youth and Academy.
