= Viacheslav Lavrov =

Soviet ice hockey player

- Born: 30 April 1958 Kirov, Russia
- Died: 16 May 2000 (aged 42)
- Height: 5 ft 11 in (180 cm)
- Weight: 183 lb (83 kg; 13 st 1 lb)
- Position: Forward
- Shot: Right
- Played for: SKA Saint Petersburg; Ilves
- National team: Soviet Union
- NHL draft: Undrafted
- Playing career: 1980–1994

Viacheslav Lavrov (30 April 1958-16 May 2000) was a professional ice hockey player who played in the Soviet Hockey League. He played for SKA St. Petersburg. He also played for the Soviet team during the 1987 Rendez-vous '87 against the NHL All-Stars.

Lavrov was killed in a car crash in 2000.
