= Viacheslav Suprunenko =

Ukrainian politician (born 1976)

Suprunenko Viacheslav Ivanovich is major shareholder of ASVIO BANK, owner of asset management company ASVIO and president of law firm "Pravozahisnyk".

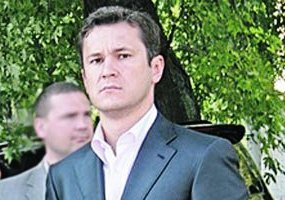
Suprunenko Vyacheslav Ivanovich

== Biography ==
He was born on September 17, 1976, in Kyiv.

In 2003 he graduated from Kyiv National University. T. Shevchenko, specialization: "The constitutional and financial law". He has a PhD in law.

Founded and headed the law firm "Pravozahisnyk" (Kyiv), which specializes in representing the interests of the community and upholding human rights.

== Social activity ==
- 2002-2006 - deputy of the Kyiv City Council of IV convocation
- 2006-2008 - deputy of the Kyiv City Council of the V convocation
- 2008-2011 - deputy of the Kyiv City Council of the VI convocation

member of the committee on the budget and the socio-economic development

He is not a member of any political party.

== Business ==
Viacheslav Suprunenko owns 61% in Asvio Bank.

He is co-founder in asset management company ASVIO

== Family ==
His father is Ivan Suprunenko, born in 1946, a manager on the railroad in Kyiv and his mother was Nadezhda Suprunenko who worked in the trust "Yugozapadtransstroy" (Kyiv), died in 2001.

Divorced. He has three children: daughter Alina (2000 year of birth), son Leonid (2002), son Ivan (2007).

His brother is Alexander Suprunenko, he was member of parliament (2014 year of election, self-promotion).

Alexander Suprunenko informed that he refuses to continue political activity and plans to focus on implementation of social and charitable projects as well as creation of independent media.
