= Vyacheslav Rafikov =

Russian footballer

Personal information
- Full name: Vyacheslav Failyevich Rafikov
- Date of birth: 19 March 1986 (age 40)
- Height: 1.82 m (5 ft 11 1/2 in)
- Position: Midfielder

Senior career*
Years	Team	Apps	(Gls)
2004	FC Izhevsk	1	(0)
2004	FC Elektronika Nizhny Novgorod	11	(1)
2005	FC Shinnik Yaroslavl	0	(0)
2006	FC Olimpia Volgograd	3	(0)
2006	FC Alnas Almetyevsk	3	(0)
2007	FC Anzhi Makhachkala	8	(0)
2009	FC Volgograd	4	(0)
2009	FC SKA Rostov-on-Don	14	(2)
2010	FC Mashuk-KMV Pyatigorsk	5	(0)
- * Club domestic league appearances and goals

Vyacheslav Failyevich Rafikov (Russian: Вячеслав Фаильевич Рафиков; born 19 March 1986) is a former Russian professional football player.

== Club career ==
He played for the main squad of FC Shinnik Yaroslavl in the Russian Cup.

He made his Russian Football National League debut for FC Anzhi Makhachkala on 7 April 2007 in a game against FC Tekstilshchik-Telekom Ivanovo.
