= Vyacheslav Chistyakov =

Russian professional ice hockey forward

- Born: December 18, 1980 (age 44); Yekaterinburg, Russia
- Height: 6 ft 2 in (188 cm)
- Weight: 205 lb (93 kg; 14 st 9 lb)
- Position: Forward
- Shot: Right
- Played for: Avtomobilist Yekaterinburg; Spuntik Nizhny Tagil
- Playing career: 1996–2014

Vyacheslav Chistyakov (born December 18, 1980) is a retired Russian professional ice hockey forward. He spent two seasons with Avtomobilist Yekaterinburg of the Kontinental Hockey League (KHL), and also played for many years on lower-tier Russian teams, including part of five seasons with Sputnik Nizhny Tagil of the Supreme Hockey League (VHL).
