= Vyacheslav Krykanov =

Russian footballer and coach

Personal information
- Full name: Vyacheslav Viktorovich Krykanov
- Date of birth: 3 January 1971 (age 55)
- Place of birth: Moscow, Russian SFSR
- Height: 1.98 m (6 ft 6 in)
- Position: Goalkeeper

Team information
- Current team: FC Sakhalin Yuzhno-Sakhalinsk (GK coach)

Youth career
- SDYuShOR-3 Sovetskogo RONO Moscow

Senior career*
Years	Team	Apps	(Gls)
1989	FC Krasnaya Presnya Moscow	1	(0)
1990–1991	FC Zvezda Moscow	21	(0)
1991–1992	FC Presnya Moscow	23	(0)
1992	FC Zvezda-Rus Gorodishche	30	(0)
1993–1995	FC Tekstilshchik Kamyshin	2	(0)
1996–1998	FC Metallurg Lipetsk	47	(0)
1999	FC Uralan Elista	0	(0)
1999	FC Mosenergo Moscow	2	(0)
2000	FC Neftekhimik Nizhnekamsk	0	(0)
2000	FC Access-Golden Grain	2	(0)
2001	FC Mosenergo Moscow	15	(0)
2002–2003	FC Arsenal Tula	54	(0)
2004–2006	FC Torpedo Vladimir	85	(0)
2007	FC Boyevoye Bratstvo Krasnoarmeysk		

Managerial career
- 2009–2010: FC Lokomotiv-2 Moscow (GK coach)
- 2011–2012: FC Lokomotiv-2 Moscow (assistant)
- 2019: FC Smolensk (GK coach)
- 2020–2022: FC Murom (GK coach)
- 2022–2023: FC Sakhalinets Moscow (GK coach)
- 2023–: FC Sakhalin Yuzhno-Sakhalinsk (GK coach)
- * Club domestic league appearances and goals

Vyacheslav Viktorovich Krykanov (Russian: Вячеслав Викторович Крыканов; born 3 January 1971) is a Russian professional football coach and a former player. He is the goalkeepers' coach with FC Sakhalin Yuzhno-Sakhalinsk.

== Honours ==
- Russian Second Division Zone West best goalkeeper: 2004.
